= List of Dollhouse episodes =

Dollhouse is an American science fiction television series created by Joss Whedon which premiered on Fox on February 13, 2009 in the United States. It ran for two seasons before its cancellation, ending its run January 29, 2010. The series comprises 27 produced episodes, with two unaired episodes – the original unaired pilot episode, "Echo" and the season one coda, "Epitaph One", which was aired internationally. Both episodes were made available on the season one DVD and Blu-ray releases.

The series focuses around Echo (Eliza Dushku), a member of a group of people known as "dolls". The dolls have had their personalities wiped clean so that they can be imprinted with any number of new personas, becoming "actives". Actives are given skills including memory, muscle memory, and language for different assignments, which are called "engagements". They are then hired out for particular jobs, crimes, fantasies, and occasional good deeds by the extremely wealthy. On missions, Actives are monitored internally (and remotely) by Handlers. In between tasks, they are mind-wiped into a childlike state referred to as the Tabula rasa (blank slate), and live in a futuristic dormitory/laboratory set up as a spa, complete with five-star cuisine, exercise equipment, pools, games, relaxation techniques and tai chi classes, and professional massages. The hidden facility is called the Dollhouse, run by Adelle DeWitt (Olivia Williams) and located in Los Angeles as part of an international network of similar facilities. The story follows Echo, who begins, in her mind-wiped state, to become self-aware.

During its two-season run, Dollhouse explores the issues of the morality and philosophy behind its technology, as well as showcasing the disastrous consequences of what could happen if the ability to wipe away a person's entire being could be put in the wrong hands. Switching between action/adventure, comedy, science fiction, drama, and conspiracy thriller, Dollhouse showcased Echo's ability to move into personhood within the tabula rasa state. During the first season the Dollhouse faces the insane rogue Active Alpha, and during the second season Echo faces down the Rossum Corporation—the force behind the Dollhouse.

Dollhouse also features an ensemble cast of the people in the Los Angeles Dollhouse, including Paul Ballard (Tahmoh Penikett), a discredited FBI agent who falls in love with Echo and finds himself entangled in the Dollhouse conspiracy in his attempts to free her, Victor (Enver Gjokaj) and Sierra (Dichen Lachman), two dolls who also "wake up" within their wiped state and fall in love with each other, and the people behind the Dollhouse—Adelle DeWitt (Olivia Williams); Topher Brink (Fran Kranz), the genius programmer behind the Dollhouse; Dr. Claire Saunders (Amy Acker), the scarred and haunted doctor of the Dollhouse who has secrets of her own; and Boyd Langton (Harry Lennix), Echo's handler and an ex-cop who struggles with the morality of the Dollhouse.

== Series overview ==
Season	Episodes	Originally released	
Season	Episodes	First released	Last released
1	13	February 13, 2009	May 8, 2009
2	13	September 25, 2009	January 29, 2010

== Episodes ==
In this table, the number in the first column refers to the episode's number within the overall series, whereas the number in the second column indicates the episode's number within that particular season. "U.S. viewers (millions)" refers to the number of Americans who watched the episode upon its original broadcast.

=== Season 1 (2009) ===
No. overall	No. in season	Title	Directed by	Written by	Original release date	Prod. code	US viewers (millions)
0	0	"Echo"	Joss Whedon	Joss Whedon	Unaired	1APK79	N/A
1	1	"Ghost"	Joss Whedon	Joss Whedon	February 13, 2009	1APK01	4.72
2	2	"The Target"	Steven S. DeKnight	Steven S. DeKnight	February 20, 2009	1APK03	4.22
3	3	"Stage Fright"	David Solomon	Maurissa Tancharoen & Jed Whedon	February 27, 2009	1APK04	4.13
4	4	"Gray Hour"	Rod Hardy	Sarah Fain & Elizabeth Craft	March 6, 2009	1APK02	3.55
5	5	"True Believer"	Allan Kroeker	Tim Minear	March 13, 2009	1APK06	4.3
6	6	"Man on the Street"	David Straiton	Joss Whedon	March 20, 2009	1APK05	4.13
7	7	"Echoes"	James Contner	Elizabeth Craft & Sarah Fain	March 27, 2009	1APK07	3.87
8	8	"Needs"	Felix Alcalá	Tracy Bellomo	April 3, 2009	1APK08	3.49
9	9	"A Spy in the House of Love"	David Solomon	Andrew Chambliss	April 10, 2009	1APK10	3.56
10	10	"Haunted"	Elodie Keene	Jane Espenson & Maurissa Tancharoen & Jed Whedon	April 24, 2009	1APK09	2.99
11	11	"Briar Rose"	Dwight Little	Jane Espenson	May 1, 2009	1APK11	3.09
12	12	"Omega"	Tim Minear	Tim Minear	May 8, 2009	1APK12	2.75
13	13	"Epitaph One"	David Solomon	Teleplay by : Maurissa Tancharoen & Jed Whedon; Story by : Joss Whedon	Unaired	1APK13	N/A

=== Season 2 (2009–10) ===
Fox renewed Dollhouse for a 13-episode second and final season that began broadcasting on September 25, 2009. Citing persistently low ratings, Fox officially canceled Dollhouse on November 11, 2009 during production of the eleventh episode.

No. overall	No. in season	Title	Directed by	Written by	Original release date	Prod. code	US viewers (millions)
14	1	"Vows"	Joss Whedon	Joss Whedon	September 25, 2009	2APK01	2.56
15	2	"Instinct"	Marita Grabiak	Michele Fazekas & Tara Butters	October 2, 2009	2APK03	2.09
16	3	"Belle Chose"	David Solomon	Tim Minear	October 9, 2009	2APK02	2.25
17	4	"Belonging"	Jonathan Frakes	Maurissa Tancharoen & Jed Whedon	October 23, 2009	2APK04	2.15
18	5	"The Public Eye"	David Solomon	Andrew Chambliss	December 4, 2009	2APK05	2.15
19	6	"The Left Hand"	Wendey Stanzler	Tracy Bellomo	December 4, 2009	2APK06	1.99
20	7	"Meet Jane Doe"	Dwight Little	Maurissa Tancharoen & Jed Whedon & Andrew Chambliss	December 11, 2009	2APK07	2.72
21	8	"A Love Supreme"	David Straiton	Jenny DeArmitt	December 11, 2009	2APK08	2.13
22	9	"Stop-Loss"	Felix Alcalá	Andrew Chambliss	December 18, 2009	2APK09	2.10
23	10	"The Attic"	John Cassaday	Maurissa Tancharoen & Jed Whedon	December 18, 2009	2APK10	2.10
24	11	"Getting Closer"	Tim Minear	Tim Minear	January 8, 2010	2APK11	2.38
25	12	"The Hollow Men"	Terrence O'Hara	Michele Fazekas & Tara Butters & Tracy Bellomo	January 15, 2010	2APK12	2.09
26	13	"Epitaph Two: Return"	David Solomon	Maurissa Tancharoen & Jed Whedon & Andrew Chambliss	January 29, 2010	2APK13	2.16
