= Dollhouse season 1 =

Dollhouse
- Season 1
- Region 1 Season 1 DVD cover
- No. of episodes: 13

Release
- Original network: Fox
- Original release: February 13 – May 8, 2009

Season chronology
- Next → Season 2

The first season of the television series Dollhouse, premiered on February 13, 2009, on Fox and concluded its 12-episode season on May 8, 2009. The season aired on Fridays at 9:00 pm ET. Together with Fringe, Dollhouse was a part of Fox's "Remote-Free TV" initiative to keep people from switching channels during commercial breaks. Therefore, every episode of this season was 47–50 minutes long compared to a usual 40–43 minute length for regular network television.

== Cast and characters ==
=== Main cast ===
- Eliza Dushku as Echo/Caroline Farrell
- Harry Lennix as Boyd Langton
- Fran Kranz as Topher Brink
- Tahmoh Penikett as Paul Ballard
- Enver Gjokaj as Victor/Anthony Ceccoli
- Dichen Lachman as Sierra/Priya Tsetsang
- Olivia Williams as Adelle DeWitt

=== Recurring cast ===
- Amy Acker as Dr. Claire Saunders/Whiskey
- Reed Diamond as Laurence Dominic
- Miracle Laurie as Mellie/November/Madelaine Costley
- Aisha Hinds as Agent Loomis
- Liza Lapira as Ivy
- Mark Sheppard as Agent Graham Tanaka
- Brett Claywell as Matt Cargill
- Kevin Kilner as Joe Hearn
- Alan Tudyk as Alpha

=== Guest ===
- Patton Oswalt as Joel Mynor
- Philip Casnoff as Clive Ambrose
- Felicia Day as Mag
- Adair Tishler as Iris/Little Caroline
- Vincent Ventresca as Nolan Kinnard
- Zack Ward as Zone

== Episodes ==
No. overall	No. in season	Title	Directed by	Written by	Original release date	Prod. code	US viewers (millions)
0	0	"Echo"	Joss Whedon	Joss Whedon	Unaired	1APK79	N/A
Agent Ballard gets new wind in his investigation of the Dollhouse when he receives a photo of Echo. DeWitt and the handlers become nervous when the Actives begin to exhibit signs of self-awareness.
1	1	"Ghost"	Joss Whedon	Joss Whedon	February 13, 2009	1APK01	4.72
Echo is introduced as one of the "Actives" in the Dollhouse. The Dollhouse's Topher Brink wipes her mind and reprograms her as a ruthlessly efficient kidnapping negotiator. Echo's new personality incorporates memories from another woman who was kidnapped and molested as a child, and it turns out the molester is one of the kidnappers with whom she must now negotiate. Her inside knowledge allows her to figure out that the molester's plan is to kill the other kidnappers and run away with both the money and the young girl. Instead, Echo turns the kidnappers against each other and rescues the girl. Meanwhile, FBI Agent Paul Ballard struggles with his assignment to uncover information on the Dollhouse, which has destroyed his marriage and is wrecking his career; his lead is small-time Russian gangster Lubov.
2	2	"The Target"	Steven S. DeKnight	Steven S. DeKnight	February 20, 2009	1APK03	4.22
Echo's latest imprint has her as the perfect date for Richard, an outdoorsman, who takes her on a romantic wilderness adventure. The experience takes a turn for the worse when Richard indicates he will conclude the "date" by hunting her to death for sport. Although Echo is imprinted with absolute trust in Boyd, he is unable to do more than deliver a weapon to her, and she must kill Richard on her own. Afterwards, the Dollhouse discovers the handiwork of Alpha, a rogue doll, on the corpse of an unknown assassin. It was Alpha who had maimed Dr. Saunders and butchered the handler Boyd was hired to replace. Agent Ballard receives an anonymous package concerning Echo's previous identity as a woman named Caroline, and continues his search.
3	3	"Stage Fright"	David Solomon	Maurissa Tancharoen & Jed Whedon	February 27, 2009	1APK04	4.13
Echo goes undercover as a backup singer to protect volatile pop star Rayna Russell from an obsessed stalker. Fellow Active, Sierra, also goes undercover as a fan who wins a contest and gets to spend an evening with Rayna. Getting closer to Rayna, Echo discovers that Rayna is in collusion with her stalker and welcomes death. Sierra is kidnapped when Echo thwarts a shooting and Echo must save Sierra from the stalker and Rayna from herself. Meanwhile, Lubov is revealed to be an Active ("Victor") and Agent Ballard is led to an abandoned basement where he is attacked by three Russian agents.
4	4	"Gray Hour"	Rod Hardy	Sarah Fain & Elizabeth Craft	March 6, 2009	1APK02	3.55
Echo is sent on a high-tech heist to recover stolen art for the Greek government, but the job goes badly when one of her accomplices double crosses them. It gets worse when, during a phone conversation with Boyd, she is remotely "wiped" by an unknown party and returns to her child-like state without any of the skills she had been imprinted with. With help from Sierra and Boyd, Echo barely manages to escape. Topher suspects only Alpha could have managed the remote wipe, and finally DeWitt confides to him that her security had indeed failed to kill Alpha.
5	5	"True Believer"	Allan Kroeker	Tim Minear	March 13, 2009	1APK06	4.3
Imprinted as a blind woman, Echo must infiltrate a heavily guarded cult in order to rescue someone being held against their will. Echo's eye implants transmit what they see to government agents watching the compound, though she herself is blind. Echo's imprint is not that of an undercover agent, but rather someone who fully believes she has been brought there in a vision by the cult's leader, a former felon. However, when that leader becomes paranoid and violent, it is Echo who steps up to save the day. Paul Ballard continues his search for Caroline, using facial recognition software. Dominic begins to reveal how much he is suspicious of and fears Echo, so much so that he tries to kill her. Topher and Dr. Saunders observe a surprising (and supposedly impossible) reaction between two of the Actives in their doll states: evidently, Victor finds Sierra attractive.
6	6	"Man on the Street"	David Straiton	Joss Whedon	March 20, 2009	1APK05	4.13
Echo is engaged by internet billionaire Joel Mynor (Patton Oswalt), who hires her annually on the anniversary of his wife's death: Once he finally made his fortune, he purchased a house and invited Rebecca to the address as a surprise, only to lose her to a traffic accident three blocks away. Mynor's fantasy is disrupted by Agent Ballard, who is shaken at the sight of Caroline. His interrogation of Mynor reveals that Paul is obsessed with her. Paul defies this by beginning a relationship with Mellie, but is further shaken when Echo is sent to assassinate him—only to go catatonic and recite a message from a spy inside the Dollhouse; she explains that there are over 20 Dollhouses around the world, all connected to the wealthy and powerful. She charges him to ferret out the Dollhouse network's true purpose. Meanwhile, Sierra shows signs of sexual abuse and Victor is implicated as her assailant. However, Boyd stages a sting operation and discovers that it is Sierra's handler, Hearn, who has been raping her. DeWitt sends Hearn to kill Mellie, explaining that Mellie knows too much. But when Hearn attacks her in Ballard's apartment, DeWitt calls and activates Mellie's combat training programming; she is a "sleeper Active", and she uses those skills to easily kill Hearn. Ballard is relieved of duty for reckless behavior while Echo completes her engagement with Joel, at last allowing him to live out his fantasy of surprising his wife.
7	7	"Echoes"	James Contner	Elizabeth Craft & Sarah Fain	March 27, 2009	1APK07	3.87
A psychotropic drug is accidentally released in a college research lab owned by the Rossum Corporation, causing the afflicted to behave drunkenly and in one case, suicidally. Rossum, which owns the Dollhouse, mobilizes all of DeWitt's Actives, who should be immune to the drug because they have no inhibitions. Unfortunately, the drug breaks down into a form that makes people relive past traumas: Sierra relives her rape experiences, Victor recalls his life as a member of the United States Army, and November weeps about Ballard's obsession with Caroline. Echo, on an unrelated assignment, sees news of the outbreak on TV and goes off-mission to "help him", despite having no idea who "he" is (or indeed who she is). She falls in with Sam Jennings (Mehcad Brooks), a student who wants to sneak into the lab and discover evidence of Rossum's foul play, while flashing back to her own past as Caroline Farrell, in which, with her boyfriend Leo, she attempted the exact same thing. These events led directly to Leo's death and DeWitt's offer of sanctuary at the Dollhouse. She repeats the offer to Sam, the corporate spy who released the drug, as the episode closes.
8	8	"Needs"	Felix Alcalá	Tracy Bellomo	April 3, 2009	1APK08	3.49
Echo, Sierra, Victor and November awake with most of their original personalities intact, and Echo attempts to escape from the Dollhouse with her fellow Actives, reclaiming bits and pieces of their past as they do so. Sierra discovers that she was forced to become a Doll after turning down sexual advances from a well-connected scientist named Nolan Kinnard; Victor is finally able to act on his attraction to her; November ("Mellie") grieves over her dead infant daughter, Katie; and Echo, after guaranteeing the other three have escaped, re-enters to the Dollhouse and forces DeWitt, at gunpoint, to release all remaining Actives. Thereafter all four "escapees" fall asleep due to subliminal programming; the entire process is revealed to have been masterminded by DeWitt and Dr. Saunders, allowing their Actives to achieve closure on their personal issues before putting them back to work.
9	9	"A Spy in the House of Love"	David Solomon	Andrew Chambliss	April 10, 2009	1APK10	3.56
While DeWitt is away on business, Topher discovers evidence of a spy in the Dollhouse, and four Actives are dispatched to deal with the problem. "Mellie" is sent to pacify Paul Ballard, but goes temporarily catatonic to deliver another warning from that spy. Sierra goes undercover at the National Security Agency, attempting to raid their databases for the spy's identity. Victor is dispatched on another "Lonely Hearts" gig; the recipient is revealed to be DeWitt. Finally, Echo volunteers to undergo imprinting to help with the investigation; after Topher turns her into a counter-intelligence agent, she helps Lawrence Dominic, the head of security, interview employees. She discovers the mole is Dominic himself, planted by the NSA to keep the Dollhouse (and its dangerous technology) from becoming common knowledge, particularly by staving off Paul Ballard. Dominic's personality is downloaded by Topher, and his body sent to "The Attic," to be employed whenever the NSA needs pacifying.
10	10	"Haunted"	Elodie Keene	Jane Espenson & Maurissa Tancharoen & Jed Whedon	April 24, 2009	1APK09	2.99
A wealthy woman named Margaret has been uploading her personality to the Dollhouse every month in the event that she is murdered. When she actually is murdered, DeWitt, who has since befriended her, imprints her onto Echo as part of her will; Margaret, posing as a pen-pal named Julia, decides to solve the case during her second chance. Margaret's prized horses turn out to be the key; with a little help from Boyd, who imprints Victor as a racehorse-owner, she solves the case and helps her family achieve some closure. Meanwhile, Topher signs Sierra out for an intensive "benchmark" imprint, which turns out to be that of a fellow gamer, nerd and friend, with whom he celebrates his birthday. Finally, Ballard brings November's prints into the FBI; when he asks fellow agent Loomis (Aisha Hinds) to run a scan, her computer spews out a multitude of names and then goes blank.
11	11	"Briar Rose"	Dwight Little	Jane Espenson	May 1, 2009	1APK11	3.09
Echo helps a young girl deal with her traumatic past, using the fairy tale of Briar Rose (Sleeping Beauty) as a vehicle; a corpse apparently slain by Alpha turns up in Tucson, Arizona, with Sierra imprinted as an FBI forensics expert to investigate; and a thumb drive arrives for Dominic, who is imprinted onto Victor's body for questioning. Ballard's investigation leads him to the Dollhouse's agoraphobic, pothead architect, Stephen Kepler (guest star Alan Tudyk), and with his forced assistance manages to sneak into the Dollhouse. Though Ballard finds Caroline, Boyd manages to detain him; he takes Ballard to DeWitt for questioning, where they learn from Sierra that the Tucson corpse is that of the real Stephen Kepler. Ballard's helper is actually Alpha, who reveals himself by attacking Victor and Dr. Saunders. Alpha imprints Echo as someone who recognizes him; with Sleeping Beauty now awakened, the lovers escape the Dollhouse together.
12	12	"Omega"	Tim Minear	Tim Minear	May 8, 2009	1APK12	2.75
Alpha, with Echo's help, kidnaps a girl named Wendy and takes both of them back to his lab; meanwhile, Dr. Saunders tends to Victor, Ballard assists the Dollhouse staff in tracking down Alpha, and a series of flashbacks depict Alpha's time at the Dollhouse, revealing that he has a long-standing crush on Echo and that Dr. Saunders is herself an Active, codenamed Whiskey, who was imprinted with the "Dr. Saunders" personality after Alpha killed the original one during his escape; Saunders becomes aware of this during the episode. Alpha imprints Wendy with Echo's original personality, Caroline Farrell; he then initiates a "composite event" on Echo, uploading multiple imprints into her at once, creating a hybrid consciousness named "Omega" whom he expects to kill Wendy/Caroline as part of her ascension to Übermensch. Instead, Echo turns on Alpha himself. Alpha escapes by killing Wendy and then putting the "wedge" containing Caroline at risk, but DeWitt remains confident that they can catch him—especially with the help of their new security consultant, Paul Ballard. Amongst Ballard's hiring conditions are that November, A.K.A. Madeline Costley, be released from her contract as though she had fulfilled it.
13	13	"Epitaph One"	David Solomon	Teleplay by : Maurissa Tancharoen & Jed Whedon; Story by : Joss Whedon	Unaired	1APK13	N/A
In the year 2019, the technology of the Dollhouse has been turned into a global weapon by the Rossum Corporation, mind-wiping people wholesale through any form of telecommunication, including radio. A group of freedom-fighters known as the Actuals breaks in to the abandoned ghost of the Los Angeles Dollhouse, where they find a haunted Active, Whiskey, willing to help them find Caroline, who will lead them to "Safe Haven" – if they can stop the murderer within their midst from taking them out, one by one...

== Production ==
The episode "Echo" was originally intended to be the on-air series pilot, but after test audiences found it "too confusing and dark", Joss Whedon decided to shoot a new pilot, "Ghost", to better introduce the story and characters to the viewing audience. It was originally reported that "Echo" was going to be aired second, after "Ghost", but when it proved impossible to salvage (even after reshoots), Whedon decided to shelve the episode completely and instead re-used footage from it for inclusion in later episodes. The episode has a different opening with Echo in multiple assignments from overseeing a criminal deal to helping a girl go into rehab. One major change is the revelation of Victor being an Active took place in the pilot rather than put off as in the original episode run, as well as Ballard's first encounter with Echo. Two actresses in this episode are featured later in the series as different characters—Ashley Johnson as Wendy/Caroline in "Omega" and Stacey Scowley as Cindy Perrin in season 2. It was included on the DVD and Blu-ray season sets released on July 28, 2009.

This mix up during production created a problem for 20th Century Fox who required a thirteen episode order for overseas markets and home release. Whedon approached Fox with an idea to produce a thirteenth episode for half the price of a standard episode and that he would shoot it with a "run and gun crew" during production of the 12th episode and official finale "Omega". Such constraints made it necessary to hire the crew from 24 (another Fox series) as well as its director of photography, Rodney Charters. The episode features the series' cast minimally and instead focuses on a group of unknown "actuals" who are trying to escape the apocalypse. This episode became "Epitaph One" which was set ten years in the future where the imprinting technology had fallen out of Rossum's control and destroyed civilization. Anticipation for the episode was high but Fox decided not to air the episode against Whedon's request and it was therefore never shown in the US. The episode was instead screened at San Diego Comic-Con on July 24, 2009.

=== Crew ===
Series creator Joss Whedon served as executive producer alongside writing duo Elizabeth Craft and Sarah Fain who ran the series with Whedon and served as co-executive producers, they originally worked with him on the final two seasons of Angel. Whedon wrote and directed two episodes—the unaired pilot and the series premiere—and wrote "Man on the Street" and provided the story for "Epitaph One". Tim Minear, who had worked on both Angel and Firefly in prominent roles, came on as consulting producer from the beginning and wrote two episodes ("True Believer" and "Omega") and subsequently directed "Omega." The writing staff also included consulting producer Steven S. DeKnight who wrote and directed "The Target" before leaving the show to produce Spartacus: Blood and Sand. Jane Espenson (another Whedon veteran) replaced DeKnight as consulting producer and co-wrote "Haunted" and wrote "Briar Rose". The writers room was rounded out with staff writers; Andrew Chambliss, who wrote "Spy in the House of Love"; Tracey Bellomo, who wrote "Needs"; and husband-wife team Maurissa Tancharoen and Jed Whedon who wrote "Stage Fright", "Haunted" (with Jane Espenson) and "Epitaph One" from a story by Whedon. Elizabeth Craft and Sarah Fain wrote the remaining episodes; "Gray Hour" and "Echoes".

Veteran Buffy director David Solomon (also co-executive producer) directed the highest number of episodes in the first season, directing three out of the thirteen including "Epitaph One". Joss Whedon directed two, one of which did not air but footage was used and placed in a variety of episodes. Other directors included Allan Kroeker, Rod Hardy, Elodie Keene, David Straiton, James Contner, Felix Alcalá and Dwight Little.

As well as starring in the show, Eliza Dushku acted as producer throughout the series' run while Kelly A. Manners (who also worked on Angel) acted as line producer for the show.

== Home video releases ==
Dollhouse: Season One was released on DVD and Blu-ray in region 1 on July 28, 2009. In region 2, it was released on DVD on September 7, 2009 and on Blu-ray on October 11, 2010 along with the release of season 2. It includes all 13 episodes, including the unaired episode "Epitaph One" and the original unaired pilot "Echo". Special features include three commentary tracks—"Ghost" by Joss Whedon and Eliza Dushku; "Man on the Street" by Joss Whedon; and "Epitaph One" by Maurissa Tancharoen and Jed Whedon. Featurettes include, "Making Dollhouse", a behind-the-scenes look at the production; "Coming Back Home", which details the various cast and crew who worked with Joss Whedon previously; "Finding Echo", an interview with actress Eliza Dushku; "Designing the Perfect Dollhouse", a tour of the Dollhouse set with Joss Whedon; and "A Private Engagement", where cast and crew talk about the technology invented for the show. Also included are deleted scenes from various episodes.

The season one DVD sold over 62,000 copies in the first week, and made over 1.8 million dollars.
