= The Attic (Dollhouse) =

- Dollhouse episode
- Episode no.: Season 2 Episode 10
- Directed by: John Cassaday
- Written by: Maurissa Tancharoen; Jed Whedon
- Production code: 2APK10
- Original air date: December 18, 2009

Episode chronology
| ← Previous "Stop-Loss" | Next → "Getting Closer" |
- Dollhouse (season 2)

"The Attic" is the tenth episode of the second season of the American science fiction television series Dollhouse and the show's 23rd episode overall. The episode was written by Maurissa Tancharoen and Jed Whedon and directed by John Cassaday. It aired in the United States on Fox on December 18, 2009.

As the title suggests, this episode focuses on the Dollhouse's frequently referenced Attic, after Echo, Priya and Anthony were all placed there at the end of "Stop-Loss". This episode was aired back-to-back with "Stop-Loss".

== Plot ==
The episode starts with a woman hooking up Echo onto machines to monitor her vitals. Shortly thereafter Echo flatlines, and a woman and man return to dispose of the body. However, Echo comes back to life and kills both of them. Echo finds Priya and Anthony and frees them, but as they try to escape, Echo is separated from Anthony and Priya by a bullet-proof wall. Priya and Anthony are cornered, shot and killed in front of Echo's eyes. It then turns out that Echo is living this moment as her nightmare.

Back in the Dollhouse, Topher informs DeWitt of Ballard's condition. Topher notes that parts of Paul's brain are dead, so the only option left to him is to install the Active architecture, and even that is not guaranteed to work. If it does work, Topher may be able to piece together the brain map Alpha did of Ballard and imprint him. Adelle tells Topher to do it, and if they fail to revive Ballard's personality, he will make a good Victor. Boyd asks Topher about the Attic. Topher tells him people who are there, are kept in a fear induced state, and either they live like that forever or die. In the Attic, Echo relives her nightmare, but eventually learns that it isn't real and walks away as Anthony and Priya are killed. Echo finds a hatch which leads her back inside the Dollhouse, but there is a tree and snow inside.

Topher continues to study Ballard's brain, and notes that there are still functional parts of the brain, but not enough to make the Active architecture take. Ivy seems to give Topher an idea, but is shortly called away to see DeWitt. Inside Echo's head, she begins to see memories of her imprints. She believes that the world she is in isn't real. Echo starts to relive moments she has had inside the Dollhouse, and as a result realizes DeWitt has put her in the Attic. A dark figure then appears before Echo and she states that it isn't real, but the figure punches Echo and she is forced to flee. Dominic appears and startles Echo, and they engage in an altercation. Echo believes Dominic is trying to kill her, but Dominic denies this and together they are able to defeat the figure. Echo and Dominic argue about who is in whose mind. Echo says this is her mind, as what they are seeing are her memories. Echo believes Dominic is real and believes the minds in the Attic are connected. Dominic says he has been chasing the figure, named Arcane, who has been killing people. Echo asks Dominic how to travel from mind to mind, but out of haste Echo leaves Dominic behind. Echo arrives in what appears to be a Japanese restaurant.

Topher talks to Ivy about her plan to bring Ballard back. However Ivy pulls away and tells Topher not to speak to her. Topher goes to speak to DeWitt and she says she is preparing Ivy to take over Topher's position. DeWitt tells Topher that he should not be keeping secrets from Rossum, citing his role in Nolan's murder. Back in Echo's head, she is talking to a man, who doesn't seem to know he is in the Attic. In Priya's mind she is having sex with Anthony, who then turns into Nolan. In Anthony's mind he is in Afghanistan fighting insurgents. He goes to flank one of them and ends up engaging in hand-to-hand combat with himself, and losing. The man Echo is talking to tells her he was reporting weaknesses in the Rossum Corporation's mainframe. Echo asks what it is, but the man simply says he is the point of weakness because he knows what it is. Arcane appears and starts to kill people. Echo says they have to go, but finds that the man's legs have been chopped off and are being served to him as cuisine - making his statement "I have to enjoy myself" literal. Dominic finds Echo and she tells him that all the Attics in the world are connected. Arcane kills the man and his mind is beginning to shut down with Echo and Dominic inside.

Adelle talks to Boyd about his recent performances and tells him he was responsible for putting Echo in the Attic. She also says that Boyd has very few choices: carry out Rossum's orders, the Attic, or death. For Dominic and Echo to get out of the man's mind they must perform his worst fear, which involves cannibalism. Back in Anthony's mind, he continues to relive his memory in Afghanistan and he struggles with himself Arcane appears to kill him, but Echo and Dominic appear and chase him off. Anthony recognizes Echo and she fills him in on what is going on. Anthony believes they need to kill Arcane by trapping him. Echo, Dominic, and Anthony use Priya as bait, and capture Arcane. However Arcane jumps back into his own mind, bringing Echo, Dominic, Anthony, and Priya with him. Arcane is revealed to be just a man named Clyde. He shows the group his nightmare, which he calls "the shape of things to come" — the post-apocalyptic world of "Epitaph One".

In the Dollhouse, Topher tells Boyd they are taking away a part of Ballard's mind so that they can use that section of the brain for other functions. Topher notes that DeWitt is going to drag them straight to hell. Echo wants to kill Clyde, but he says that if he dies, no one else can take down Rossum. His mission is to take down the mainframe, explaining that they live in a fear-induced state, reliving their worst fears over and over. By doing this, Rossum is running human brains as computers. Clyde has been killing people to free them, take away Rossum's CPUs, and prevent the nightmarish future he predicts from coming true. The group makes a run for it and hole up in a small room for safety. Clyde reveals that he was one of the two original founders of Rossum and he discovered the technology for imprinting. He tells the group that in the beginning, his persona was used to imprint someone, but this persona was modified not to have aspirations or the knowledge Clyde possessed, which was dubbed Clyde 2.0. He was just a drone, who followed orders. The other founder gave Clyde 2.0 the order to betray Clyde and he ended up being the first person in the Attic. Clyde asks what year is it, and Echo tells him it is 2010, which makes him believe Rossum is still a long way from completing its mission. But he realizes they are much further ahead of schedule when Echo tells him of an imprinted politician. Clyde tries to remember the other founder of Rossum and Clyde 2.0, but cannot recall it, as it has been scrubbed from him. Clyde says there is a person who knows who they are. Echo says Caroline and Clyde confirms it is her. However Echo doesn't have Caroline's memory and the group does not know how to get out of the Attic. However Echo has an idea and deliberately walks into a bullet.

Back in the Dollhouse, Ballard is being revived. He is visibly disoriented as his brain adjusts to the changes. Ballard asks what is going on. Topher tells Ballard has Active architecture, and even though he is himself, he is in fact an imprint. Boyd tells Ballard about Echo, Priya and Victor being in the Attic. Ballard takes Boyd's revolver and barges into DeWitt's office. However DeWitt is expecting him, already having a gun aimed at the door as Ballard walks in. There is a standoff, and Ballard prepares to kill DeWitt.

In Clyde's mind, Echo is bleeding to death. From her own scenario, Echo says that when a person dies, the person is disengaged from the system, which Clyde confirms. Echo plans to die, disengage and come back to life. Priya and Anthony offer to go with Echo. Dominic and Clyde decide to stay and help residents of the Attic become aware. Echo revives herself exactly as planned, killing those in her way, as seen in the first scene. Anthony stabs Priya, and Echo is there to revive Priya. Anthony sacrifices himself to the post-apocalyptic mob, and Echo revives him as well. Echo returns to the Dollhouse and tells DeWitt she got the information she wanted. She understands the mainframe and DeWitt's plan has worked.

It is revealed in a flashback, when Echo was about to be placed in the Attic, that DeWitt instructs Echo to go into the Attic and find whatever Rossum is hiding. DeWitt believes that the Attic is where Rossum's darkest secrets are and that Echo is the only one that can retrieve them, because no one else is like her. It is the only way to get the edge they need to overthrow Rossum.

In DeWitt's office, Echo, along with Priya, Anthony, Topher, Ivy, Ballard, and Boyd have all joined together to overthrow Rossum. DeWitt declares they are ready. Echo disagrees, declaring that "it's time for me to meet Caroline. It's time to win her war."

== Notes ==
- The episode included the song, "No, I Don't Remember" by Anna Ternheim.

== Reception ==
=== Reviews ===
Rachel Reitsleff from iF Magazine said "The Attic" was "a terrific episode in terms of content, momentum, surprises and emotion. Bravo." Eric Goldman from IGN said the episode, "was a really strong hour of television, delivering a lot of trippy situations and plenty of forward plot momentum as we hurtle towards the end of the series." He goes onto say "overall, this episode was terrifically entertaining, delivering atmosphere and tension the show was lacking for much of its run. I am happy to find myself invested in this story more than I ever have been, and excited to see how it plays out next month."
