= Remains (song) =

Single by Maurissa Tancharoen & Jed Whedon
- Released: July 9, 2009
- Genre: Pop
- Length: 4:04
- Label: Nervous Circus
- Songwriters: Jed Whedon, Maurissa Tancharoen
- Producers: Jed Whedon, Maurissa Tancharoen

"Remains" is a single from Maurissa Tancharoen and Jed Whedon and was released on July 9, 2009.

The track was co-written and produced by Maurissa and Jed specifically for inclusion in "Epitaph One," the unaired episode of Joss Whedon's sci-fi television series Dollhouse, which Maurissa and Jed also wrote together.

== Song information ==
During writing and production of "Epitaph One," the 13th unaired episode of Dollhouse (the television series for which Tancharoen and Whedon also write), the two writers felt that a piece of music was necessary over the coda of the episode, but due to budget concerns, they were unable to use a famous or popular song at the time. Rather, Tancharoen and Whedon wrote "Remains," which can be heard over the episode's final scenes. However, they wanted the song not to appear too close to the content of the episode lyrically, so as not to distract the viewer with the realization that the song was composed specifically for the episode, despite the lyrics being thematically relevant but not overly specific to the context. Tancharoen and Whedon were happy with the end result of the song, which they felt sounded like a genuine piece of contemporary music, thus prompting them to release the song on its own merit as well.

Despite "Epitaph One" having not aired on television in the United States, the episode did air in foreign markets (airdates varied) and was released in the U.S. on the first season DVD set of Dollhouse on July 28, 2009, with the song fully intact.

Tancharoen and Whedon have since lent their musical writing and production and/or vocal abilities to The Legend of Neil's musical episode, the music video "(Do You Wanna Date My) Avatar" for The Guild, and previously in Dr. Horrible's Sing-Along Blog, again with brothers Joss Whedon and Zack Whedon. Coincidentally, all of these productions also featured Felicia Day.

== Music video ==
A video was released October 12, 2010. It is written, directed, and shot by Anton King and features Tancharoen (who played Kilo in Dollhouse), Fran Kranz (Topher in Dollhouse), Caitlin Stasey, and J.R. Starr.

== See also ==
- digital single
