= Epitaph One =

- Dollhouse episode
- The Survivors - Zone, Iris/Caroline, Mag
- Episode no.: Season 1 Episode 13
- Directed by: David Solomon
- Story by: Joss Whedon
- Teleplay by: Maurissa Tancharoen; Jed Whedon
- Production code: 1APK13
- Original air date: June 17, 2009
- Running time: 50 minutes

Episode chronology
← Previous "Omega"	Next → "Vows"
- Dollhouse (season 1)

"Epitaph One" is the 13th episode of the first season of the American science fiction television series Dollhouse. The episode originally aired on the Season Pass on demand service from SingTel mio TV in Singapore on June 17, 2009 and later became available on DVD and Blu-ray on July 28, 2009. It is also the first episode of the series to feature Felicia Day, an actress with whom Joss Whedon had worked a number of times prior to Dollhouse.

The episode was not aired in the USA due to different contractual obligations with the Fox Network (the television broadcaster) and 20th Century Fox Television (the production company). 20th Century Fox needed thirteen episodes for the first season's DVD release and to sell to foreign markets, and having paid for but then scrapped the unaired original pilot episode, Fox only contracted the subsequent twelve episodes, but not the thirteenth. While Fox did renew the show for a second season, they never broadcast "Epitaph One." Due to Fox's decision not to air "Epitaph One," 20th Century Fox opted to promote the episode as a special incentive to buy the DVD and Blu-ray set releases of the Dollhouse's first season, in which the episode, and the original unaired pilot, are both included. In the United Kingdom the episode aired on the UK Sci Fi Channel on August 11, 2009.

The episode is set in 2019 in a post-apocalyptic state and utilized flashbacks within the episode to hint at the future the show may or may not take in later seasons. (Season Two confirmed that it did.) Joss Whedon screened the episode during the Dollhouse panel at the 2009 San Diego Comic-Con and said the show would continue to feature scenes set in the future, that several of the characters introduced in this episode (including Felicia Day's character) would appear in episodes of the second season, and that the second season would follow the general continuity laid out in the episode, while reminding the audience that the episode is based on memories that may or may not be accurate.

A sequel, "Epitaph Two: Return" was aired on January 29, 2010.

== Plot ==
In 2019, Mag (Felicia Day), Zone (Zack Ward), Griff (Chris William Martin), Lynn (Janina Gavankar), a child named Iris (Adair Tishler) and her wiped father (Warren Sweeney) get into the sewers and find a hole into the Dollhouse. Here the group restore power and find the chair. Attached is a tablet with a simplified interface and a number of sets of recorded memories. The father is placed into the chair and is given several sets of memories, one at a time. Through this method, events leading to the current apocalyptic state of the world are revealed. The group quickly realizes that the Dollhouse is the origin of the imprinting technology. The first set of memories shows Topher's introduction to the Dollhouse with DeWitt and Dominic, and his creation of a new imprinting system that used a different approach to the technology, leading to the development of the chair found in this episode. The old technology used analog cables, which took two hours to upload into an active. Topher brags that he can do it faster using waves instead, and laughs off Dominic's warnings that such an upgrade could easily go out of control.

Lynn takes Iris to use the bathroom, but is distracted by the possibility of having her first hot shower in a year. She is killed by an unseen figure. A memory is shown with Echo in the chair, being imprinted for a client. Paul Ballard is now her handler. When Ballard and Echo are alone in the elevator she discusses her ability to maintain her own personality in parallel with her imprint but laments the terrible headaches this process gives her. Meanwhile, Iris finds Lynn's body and her screams bring the group to investigate. They all retreat to the chair room.

In a flashback, Boyd is preparing to leave the Dollhouse, collecting weapons, clothes, and food. He believes that he has placed Echo in danger and does not wish to place Dr. Saunders, with whom he is now romantically involved, in the same position. She gives him medicine and bandages, indicating that he has been recently injured. Before he leaves, he promises to return for her. This scene is later expanded upon and further explained in the season 2 episode, "Getting Closer".

The survivors decide to give Iris what they call a "birthmark" — a tattoo on her back that allows people to distinguish actuals from imprinted people. Dr. Saunders suddenly appears on the Dollhouse's main floor; but it seems that she has reverted to her doll persona, "Whiskey". The survivors surround her, weapons aimed, accuse her of killing Lynn, and are about to execute her when she says she can lead them to "Safe Haven," a rumored place away from imprinting and "tech." Whiskey states that the memories in the tablet would lead them there.

In another imprinted memory Victor, who has been imprinted with Mr. Ambrose, a high-ranking executive in the Rossum Corporation, informs DeWitt and Topher that the company is going to begin selling the bodies of the actives for "a lump nine-figure sum." Select clients will have immortality, similar to that discussed in the episode "Haunted." Topher is visibly upset but says nothing. DeWitt is shocked and protests about the legality of such a procedure, but Ambrose informs DeWitt that it will be legal in a year, as everyone in a position of authority is either a client or "one of ours." When DeWitt threatens to reclaim Victor's body, Mr. Ambrose tells her that she can opt out, but that he is currently in ten other dolls talking to ten other Dollhouse administrators, and that Rossum will know if they choose not to cooperate.

Back in 2019, Iris kills Griff, then frames her father, still in the chair, by shoving the gun in his hand and screaming to attract attention. While Zone takes the father to the bathroom and executes him, Whiskey imprints herself with another set of memories: Mr. Dominic retrieved from the Attic by DeWitt and Topher; by this time, much of the general population had already been imprinted, beginning the apocalyptic events leading to the current situation. Dominic gloats about how he was right about them losing control, but DeWitt asks him to join them. They have a way to fight back: Caroline is now immune to imprinting.

Whiskey is given another memory in which Victor and Sierra are seen with their original personalities back. Victor shows Sierra hidden hard drive wedges with copies of everyone, while also showing that Sierra is the one who began the ideas of tattoos to be placed in order to remember who they really are. She also mentions for Victor to be careful when he leaves to go to the surface, stating "Don't forget what happened to November" (something that is explained in the season 2 episode "The Hollow Men").

The survivors find the wedges and decide to imprint Whiskey with Caroline's personality. With the loss of Griff, Zone decides that it's time for Iris to have a gun to protect herself. Before long, Iris turns her gun on them revealing that she is an imprint. She does not know how she ended up in a child's body but she is going to take Mag's, and Zone's usefulness is at an end. When she fires her gun at Zone, she finds that it is unloaded, and after a brief struggle Zone puts her into the chair and they activate the chair, overwriting Iris's personality. Zone explains that he figured out that Iris was not who she claimed she was when he executed her so-called father: he had a tattoo but it did not match Iris's surname.

In the memory set in Iris's imprint, the Dollhouse has isolated itself. The actives have all been given their original personalities back. Topher, now mentally unstable, explains to DeWitt that a phone call could be made, and anyone who picked up the phone would be imprinted (similar to the way Echo was wiped in "Gray Hour"). This would create an instant army of people programmed to kill everyone who isn't imprinted. Topher realizes that this is happening because of the technology he made possible: imprinting people with waves rather than the slower, analog method. The guilty realization of the part he has played in causing armageddon has driven him mad. DeWitt tries to comfort him but they are interrupted when a series of crashes is heard from elsewhere in the Dollhouse, which turns out to be someone trying to break through a block wall sealing off the entrance to the complex. The residents take up arms and prepare to defend themselves as the wall comes down, revealing Caroline and Paul, who have returned to take the actives to a compound, which is a place where they will be safe from imprinting, thanks to Alpha. Caroline requests that Topher make a copy of her personality to help others find the way there in case she's killed or another group of people finds the Dollhouse. Saunders explains that Topher no longer enters the imprinting room, but she volunteers to make the copy herself. As preparations to leave the Dollhouse are underway, DeWitt notes that Echo has returned to save the actives, but asks what her plans are for the former Dollhouse administrative staff. Caroline cocks her pistol and the memory ends.

In 2019, Caroline is imprinted into Iris's body. She quickly agrees to take them to the compound she mentioned in the memories, which is called Safe Haven. An explosion erupts from a device that the survivors left in the shaft that leads into the Dollhouse. The noise tells them that the imprinted butchers have reached the Dollhouse and that the group must leave immediately. Mag implores Whiskey to come with them but she says she must wait, as she is waiting for 'someone' (something that is explained in the season 2 episode "The Hollow Men"). Caroline, Zone, and Mag shoot their way across the Dollhouse to the elevator shaft and start climbing; once they're inside the shaft, Whiskey activates a gas system rendering the imprinted butchers unconscious. With the survivors safe, Whiskey sits down on the balcony, her fate left unknown.

Mag, Caroline, and Zone climb the shaft and arrive in DeWitt's old office. Through the broken window they see Los Angeles in ruins. A large collage of photos is assembled on the wall under the words "To Remember." Photos of Whiskey, Victor, Sierra, November, and Caroline are amongst them. Caroline picks her photo off the wall, saying she hopes she'll find herself alive; then she puts the photo back. The group then climb out the window onto a ladder and the episode ends.

== Writing ==
Joss Whedon had conceived many ideas for the episode, but turned the reins for writing it over to his brother Jed Whedon and sister-in-law Maurissa Tancharoen, who work together as a writing duo. Some of Joss's initial ideas for the episode include the concept of "actuals" tattooing their real names on their backs in the post-apocalyptic future.

One of the biggest challenges with writing the episode was the slang, which they felt needed to sound like it could genuinely exist in ten years' time. This was fun for Whedon and Tancharoen to write, and they enjoyed finding the balance between interesting words which would also be understandable to the viewer; for example, in the future of 2019, the word "bars" itself has come to mean "signal".

By setting the episode in the distant future, the writers were able to give us an idea of the series' direction (and closure in the face of possible cancellation) through the device of flashforwards into the show's future; these flashforwards are not seen in the actual core narrative of the episode, but rather through flashbacks in the 2019 setting in the form of character memories. This gives future writers room to move towards these storylines in various directions while allowing new ideas to come through and lead the show in other creative directions. Joss Whedon has also stated that the use of memories as the medium through which future events allows the audience and future writing teams to question the reliability and accuracy of some of what has been seen. This means there is room for future writers to ignore or change things seen in flashforwards to suit the needs of future storylines, actor commitments, etc.

One facet of the flashforwards was to make their revelations ambiguous. For example, a scene with Boyd (Harry Lennix) and Dr. Saunders (Amy Acker) could be interpreted as either alluding to a new romantic relationship or merely a more developed friendship. The two writers chose to affect a similar ambiguity in the friendship between Adelle (Olivia Williams) and Topher (Fran Kranz). Other ambiguities include the fate of Sierra/Priya (Dichen Lachman); seen in flashbacks alongside Victor's real identity (Enver Gjokaj), but not in later scenes. Whedon and Tancharoen feel this could imply she was the one to start the resistance movement.

The writers came up with some of the themes for the episode while writing episode ten, "Haunted", alongside former Buffy/Angel/Firefly writer Jane Espenson. In that episode, a character was able to solve her own murder using the Dollhouse's technology. When Whedon and Tancharoen thought about the implications of this, they added a few lines to the script for "Haunted" which resonate with "Epitaph One". In an "Epitaph One" flashforward, Clive Ambrose (in Victor's body) now offers the Dolls' bodies for upgrades to their richest clients, offering immortality and physical perfection.

Whedon and Tancharoen enjoyed many of the developments the episode let them seed for future characters, such as Topher's mental breakdown. However, some were more subtle. They stated in the commentary that in the scene with Paul (Tahmoh Penikett) and Echo (Eliza Dushku), Paul will, in upcoming episodes become Echo's "handler" (the role formerly belonging to Boyd). Another is peeling back more "layers" of the DeWitt character, who becomes protective over Victor's body because she is in love with him; in this instance, the line "That body belongs to another soul" becomes the first time DeWitt speaks of the Actives as people with real souls. Director David Solomon placed Paul and Victor together in the background of a scene between Caroline (Dushku) and Saunders, which implies that the two develop a friendship. Priya's surname is also revealed, which was contributed by actress Dichen Lachman. Whedon and Tancharoen were happy with "Tsetsang".

The ending scenes of the episode raised some questions. For example, Whiskey (Acker) is seen gassing a room full of butchers. However, Whedon feels that perhaps she is just putting them to sleep and will clean up and continue protecting the Dollhouse as always. If this is the case, it raises the interesting possibility that all the events of the episode have happened before or will again. The final fates of the main cast are also left ambiguous; Caroline puts a gun to DeWitt's head in a future flashforward, and a board is marked "To Remember" featuring pictures of Echo, Sierra, Victor and November (Miracle Laurie, who does not appear in the episode). This could have several meanings: to remember one's real identity, to remember the fallen, or (were the show canceled) to remember the show; the actors and the crew's pictures composed the board.

== Production ==
Joss Whedon had wanted someone not conventionally strong for the part of Mag, who he felt should be a regular girl who the audience could see thrown into an impossible situation and not a battle-hardened or tough woman. Writers Jed Whedon and Maurissa Tancharoen selected Felicia Day, who they use in "pretty much everything" because of her girl next door quality. Over the casting of Adair Tishler, Tancharoen "geeked out", having been a fan of her role in Heroes as Molly Walker. Tancharoen's bridesmaid played a pregnant woman in the Dollhouse, and the crew along with their families and friends' pictures were used to make up the board marked "To Remember" in the episode's closing scene.

Due to the time and budget concerns, the episode was filmed concurrently with the twelfth, "Omega", and had to use the crew from 24 as well as its director of photography, Rodney Charters and feature the series' cast minimally. This meant, for example, the Dollhouse sets had to be redressed for "post-apocalyptic" scenes and then stripped back down again for contemporary ones in "Omega". Actors' schedules, the filming of "Omega" and child acting laws meant that Reed Diamond (Dominic), Eliza Dushku and Adair Tishler had to complete their filming in a single day; the scene with Dominic and DeWitt was the first shot. In the case of Tishler, all her shooting had to be completed in a few short hours.

Joss Whedon has said that "Epitaph One" was filmed and produced on a significantly smaller budget than was used to produce the previous episodes. Feeling that the episode still turned out creatively strong, he screened the episode to executives at Fox after the first season was completed as proof positive he could create the show without spending a lot of money. This, coupled with the show's strong performance numbers on DVR and the Internet and the hope that the show could sell well on DVD with the inclusion of this episode, prompted the network to renew Dollhouse for a second season in the fall.

"Epitaph One" was also written to serve as a satisfying series closer to the loyal audience members should Dollhouse not receive a second season renewal. In one sense, the challenge for the writers was to give a sense of closure to the series as a whole whilst also setting things up for potential future seasons. Since the show did get renewed, however, the producers planned to use several elements (including the flashforwards in time and Felicia Day's character, Mag) from the episode during the show's second season. Scenes featuring Mag, Zone and Caroline-in-the-body-of-Iris were filmed for the second season premiere, "Vows", but cut because the episode was "long and crowded with information". This material, as well as newly filmed scenes with the characters, appeared in the series finale, "Epitaph Two: Return".

Due to budget concerns, a real "pop" song could not be used in the ending montage of the episode but writers Whedon and Tancharoen thought it would be necessary. To accommodate this, Tancharoen wrote and performed a song titled "Remains," which can be heard in the background during the episode's final scenes. However, they wanted the song to not be too close lyrically to the content of the episode so as not to distract viewers with the realisation it was made specifically for the episode. The composed lyrics were thematically relevant, but not overly specific to the context. Whedon and Tancharoen were happy with the results, which they felt sounded a genuine piece of contemporary music. "Remains" was released as a single on both Amazon.com and iTunes on July 9, 2009.

== Release ==
Despite advertising that the episode would have its debut at Comic Con 2009 on July 24, 2009, the episode had its real premiere on the Season Pass on demand service from SingTel mio TV in Singapore on June 17, 2009. The episode was first broadcast in Sweden on July 26, 2009. When aired in Australia, the episode was retitled 'The Future Project'.

The episode is present on the DVD and Blu-ray season sets released on July 28, 2009 and is currently available on Amazon, iTunes, and PSN.

== Reception ==
=== Reviews ===
Eric Goldman from IGN said the episode, "In a word: Unusual." He notes that only after twelve episodes they are approaching this show from a new angle, and "it's a rather effective, offbeat tactic Whedon and this episode's writers, Maurissa Tancharoen and Jed Whedon, are taking here. The episode is certainly fueled by the persistent 'What the hell is going on?' question raised by dropping us into the middle of such a different situation." Myles McNutt from his blog on cultural-learnings.com stated that the episode, "isn’t perfect, but in its stylistic flair (it’s really well shot, amongst other things) and its tantalizing images of the past (but, for us, the future) it makes me more hyped for Dollhouse’s return than for the return of any other show this fall." Emily VanDerWerff from HitFix said that the episode "suggests far more than it shows, and that makes it all the better" and goes on to say, "they create the sense of something epic that we're only seeing the tip of, that there is a bulk and a weight to this show that could outdo anything else Whedon has done."

=== Sales ===
"Epitaph One" was released on both Amazon.com and iTunes on August 11, 2009. It was reported by Robert Seidman, that "Epitaph One" had reached number one on iTunes Top TV Download List on August 16, 2009. "Epitaph One" would then go on to take top spot in the sci-fi genre in 2009.

== Awards ==
In April 2010, it was nominated for the Hugo Award for Best Dramatic Presentation, Short Form
