= Getting Closer (Dollhouse) =

- Dollhouse episode
- Episode no.: Season 2 Episode 11
- Directed by: Tim Minear
- Written by: Tim Minear
- Production code: 2APK11
- Original air date: January 8, 2010

Episode chronology
| ← Previous "The Attic" | Next → "The Hollow Men" |
- Dollhouse (season 2)

"Getting Closer" is the 11th episode of the second season of the American science fiction television series Dollhouse and the show's 24th episode overall. The episode was written and directed by Tim Minear. It aired in the United States on Fox on January 8, 2010.

This episode sees the beginning of the events that will lead to the post-apocalyptic world in "Epitaph One". Like "Epitaph One" and the season one episode "Echoes", this episode is partially told through a series of flashbacks.

== Plot ==
The episode starts three years ago. Caroline has gained access to DeWitt's office by seducing one of the security personnel. There she finds files on both herself and Bennett Halverson. She also stumbles upon the security cameras of the L.A. Dollhouse, which show "experiments" on people.

Back in the present day, DeWitt, Echo, Priya, Anthony, Topher, Ivy, Ballard and Boyd discuss the implications of imprinting Caroline into Echo. Topher is concerned Caroline will fight back when she finds Echo and her other personas inhabiting her body, but Echo believes she would win the fight. DeWitt orders Echo into the chair for Caroline to be imprinted. However, Caroline's original wedge is missing.

Another flashback shows Bennett in college and meeting Caroline for the first time. They shortly become friends. Back in the Dollhouse, Echo views video of Caroline that Alpha had previously sent to Ballard. DeWitt is there, telling Echo that Caroline was worse than evil, that she was an idealist. Echo tells DeWitt she was glad when she heard the wedge was missing but that she didn't take it. DeWitt responds by saying she only considered that scenario briefly.

In Topher's lab, Ivy believes Echo did take the wedge. Topher is quick to rebuff saying Echo endured the Attic for the information and it wouldn't make sense. Topher and Ivy work together to hack into the D.C. Dollhouse. They are able to upload their own imprint to an active in the D.C. Dollhouse, which then enable Ballard and Anthony to get inside. There, they kidnap Bennett, but Ballard notices November and takes her with them.

At the L.A. Dollhouse, Bennett is asked to assist Topher. Bennett initially refuses but DeWitt tells her she can be treated as a guest or a prisoner, and Bennett complies. DeWitt orders a full lockdown of the Dollhouse as Echo tries to comfort Ballard about November, but Ballard isn't so sure, given he himself is now an imprint.

Topher brings Caroline's backup which Alpha damaged in "Omega," and believes Bennett can put it back together given she has done something similar before. Topher and Bennett begin to flirt, but Bennett asks who the person they are trying to save is. Topher tries to deflect, but Bennett spots Echo and understands what is going on.

Boyd goes to a hotel room to bring Dr. Saunders back to the Dollhouse. It is clear they are in a relationship. Back in the Dollhouse, Topher is rummaging through medical supplies. He has been punched by Bennett. Echo is there and asks what he did to Ballard. Again, Topher attempts to deflect, Echo pushes him to reveal that he unintentionally took away the connection between him and Echo, though not the memories. Dr. Saunders returns and treats Topher.

In a flashback, Dominic informs DeWitt that three months ago, security footage was deleted from the main building, but not the Dollhouse. He also informs DeWitt that it was Caroline that broke into her office and stole two files, her own and that of Bennett Halverson. In their college dorm, Bennett enquires to why Caroline has a file on her. Caroline tells Bennett she stole it from an office in L.A., and that Bennett was seemingly important to Rossum and therefore important to her. Bennett notes that Caroline used her, but Caroline tells Bennett that Rossum is experimenting on people and need to be stopped. Bennett agrees to help and together they decide to blow up a Rossum building.

Back inside the Dollhouse, Echo watches over Bennett through a two-way mirror. Boyd enters and Echo confesses that she is not so sure if she is real. Boyd tells Echo she is stronger than Caroline and that once Caroline gets inside she would be proud to know Echo. Boyd leaves to place the Dollhouse into lockdown, but Echo asks him to delay it for a few minutes. Echo gets Priya and Anthony to come with her and tells them to leave and be together. They do and as Echo is about to return to the Dollhouse, Dominic appears, having broken out of the Attic, and tells Echo that Clyde is dead and Rossum is onto them. DeWitt assumes the information is true and orders a full evacuation, where all actives have their original personalities restored. They will be leaving for Tucson shortly.

In a flashback, Bennett and Caroline arrive to blow up several of Rossum's labs. Bennett hides in an office guiding Caroline around as she places charges. Caroline passes a lab that isn't on the schematics and goes in to check it out. She sees people kept in tubes and urges Bennett to abort. Unfortunately, the charges are on a timer, so she tells Bennett to run. The charges go off before either can escape.

Back inside the Dollhouse, Dr. Saunders informs DeWitt that Dominic is going into shock and needs to go to a hospital. DeWitt has no personnel to do so, but Ballard asks for Dominic to be evacuated as well. DeWitt orders Dominic to go back to the Attic. Dominic says he would rather die, but DeWitt tells him, "I'd rather you didn't." Ballard protests, but Echo states that Dominic's best chance is in the Attic and having someone in the mainframe is not a bad idea. Mellie's personality has been restored into November and will be among the ones to be evacuated. Boyd informs DeWitt of Mr. Ambrose's arrival. Mr. Ambrose informs DeWitt that he is taking over the Dollhouse. Boyd takes out the guards and Mr. Ambrose but is wounded in the process.

In another flashback (first seen in "The Left Hand," just after the explosion, Bennett's arm is trapped under rubble. Caroline is unable to free Bennett. Caroline tells Bennett that she will turn herself in and that Bennett will be able to save herself by telling Rossum she was working late.

Echo enters the interrogation room and makes Bennett a deal. If Bennett brings Caroline back, Echo will hold Caroline down and let Bennett have at her. In DeWitt's office, DeWitt believes Mr. Ambrose is in more than one body. She plans to let the others know that Boyd killed one of them, and Boyd will need to run to draw their fire. As Topher finishes up restoring all the actives' original selves, he and Bennett begin work on Caroline's wedge again. In a scene previously shown as a flashback in "Epitaph One", Boyd packs to leave and promises to return for Dr. Saunders. Bennett and Topher flirt once again, and kiss passionately. Topher leaves the room to get some tools as Dr. Saunders walks in, where she expresses that Bennett is remarkable for being able to provoke love in someone like Topher. Topher walks back into the room and Dr. Saunders shoots Bennett in the head.

In a flashback Caroline surrenders to Dominic. DeWitt plans to bring her back to the L.A. Dollhouse, but instead is ordered to send her up to see the head of Rossum.

In the present, DeWitt tries to bring Topher out of shock. Echo and Ballard believe Dr. Saunders was a sleeper. Echo goes to track down Dr. Saunders, but the Dollhouse is breached by Rossum agents. Topher is able to refocus as Ivy has been working on the wedge, but Topher tells Ivy to leave and make her own way. Topher does not wish for Ivy to become him. Ivy leaves and Ballard follows suit to get weapons. Topher finishes the wedge and begins the imprinting of Echo. Topher tells DeWitt to leave; she does so and takes Mellie with her. An agent comes into the imprinting room and Topher attempts to stall by threatening he has "imprinted himself with many useful skills", but is quickly knocked out. Echo is still being imprinted and thus vulnerable but Boyd arrives and swiftly takes out the agent. He tells Echo to "hang in there".

Echo begins to live out Caroline's memories, one of which was when she met the head of Rossum. Clyde 2.0 introduces himself as "Clyde Randolph the Second... or the Fifth" and that he uses a lot of bodies. Boyd then reveals himself as Clyde's partner. They say Caroline is going to help them and that she is far too valuable to be harmed. The episode ends with Caroline asking, "And I'm just going to trust you?" to which Boyd simply responds, "With your life."

== References to other Joss Whedon shows ==
While looking through Bennett's Rossum File, Echo says, "I bet she could kill me with her brain." River Tam (also played by Summer Glau) said she could kill Jayne with her brain in the Firefly episode "Trash".

During a flashback, while Caroline is washing Bennett's hair, Bennett says to Caroline, "You're so fearless, I'd love to get a look at your amygdala." Simon Tam discovers that his sister, River Tam, has had her amygdala "stripped" in the Firefly episode "Ariel".

== Trivia ==
- Eliza Dushku's then-boyfriend, Rick Fox, makes a cameo in this episode as an active Topher restores to his original state of mind.
- Mike Massa, David Boreanaz's stunt double for Angel, appears in a non-speaking role as Apollo, the compromised D.C. Dollhouse Active.

== Reception ==
=== Reviews ===
Jevon Phillips from Los Angeles Times said "Getting Closer" was "taking viewers on a very cool roller-coaster ride with enough quick spins to create couch-bound whiplash, seems so ... mean." Rachel Reitsleff from iF Magazine said the episode was "a strong if slightly rushed episode with one moment of total WTF and another that has enormous impact, even if one has had suspicions it might come." She does praise the Director/Writer, Tim Minear saying, he had the "task of cramming what feels like at least half a season’s worth of plots into one episode and does a fine job of it." Eric Goldman from IGN said the episode, was "good – if somewhat rushed and messy – episode of Dollhouse, which was capped off by one hell of an ending, that featured two huge twists and instantly elevated the storyline."
