= Vows (Dollhouse) =

- Dollhouse episode
- Echo asks for Paul's help to find Caroline.
- Episode no.: Season 2 Episode 1
- Directed by: Joss Whedon
- Written by: Joss Whedon
- Production code: 2APK01
- Original air date: September 25, 2009

Episode chronology
← Previous "Epitaph One"	Next → "Instinct"
- Dollhouse (season 2)

"Vows" is the premiere of the second season of the American science fiction television series Dollhouse and the show's 14th episode overall. The episode was written and directed by series creator and executive producer Joss Whedon, and aired in the United States on Fox on September 25, 2009. "Vows" follows the first season finale, "Omega", and takes place several months after the events of that episode. Therefore, it is set in the present as opposed to the unaired thirteenth episode, "Epitaph One".

In the episode, Echo is sent on an engagement as a young woman who marries an elusive international arms dealer, played by Jamie Bamber, and Ballard is offered a position as Echo's new handler. Dr. Saunders struggles with the revelation that she is a Doll and gets some surprising revelations from Topher. A U.S. Senator starts an investigation into the Rossum Corporation. The episode was met with mostly positive reviews.

== Plot ==
The episode starts with Echo getting an imprint. Paul Ballard is seemingly concerned at whether Echo can handle this, but Topher reassures Ballard everything will be fine. During the imprinting process, Topher experiences glitches with his computer and suspects it is Dr. Saunders who is messing with him and goes to sleep. Adelle and Boyd discuss the dangers of keeping Ballard on staff, but Adelle seems unfazed. Echo is then seen on an engagement and is getting married.

Topher wakes up and finds that there are rats in the cupboard placed in there by Dr. Saunders. Topher calls Dr. Saunders, who accuses Topher of faulty imprinting and Topher quickly rebuffs this saying that his work is perfection and her "mental health" is her fault. Boyd then walks into the room to speak with Dr. Saunders, handing in a report about Victor and his plastic surgery to mend his scars. Dr. Saunders does speak up about how Victor was given the surgery and not her, but says she is fine with it. Boyd asks her out to dinner but she declines, saying she is scared of open spaces and it is just how she was made. Boyd rebuffs this saying it is an excuse and ultimately we are all a series of excuses.

Echo returns to Paul after spending the night with her "husband". It turns out Ballard is using Echo as an undercover agent to finally put the people away that he missed during his time at the FBI. Echo is then brought in for a check-up and whilst under examination by Dr. Saunders, she recalls an engagement they had together. Echo calls Dr. Saunders Whiskey and they re-account the details that sent Echo to the position of number one doll. Adelle watches while Senator Perrin declares on TV that he will investigate the Rossum Corporation for withholding medical advancements. Boyd immediately suspects Ballard, but Ballard disregards the accusations. Adelle then offers Ballard the position of Echo's handler given how much he cares for her, despite how unhealthy it seems. Meanwhile it seems Echo has been found out. There have been photos taken of her and Paul Ballard drawing suspicion towards her.

Dr. Saunders tries to seduce Topher while he is trying to sleep. Dr. Saunders hypothesizes that she was programmed to hate Topher so they would fall in love, in a sense something that is more real than a "love slave". Topher declines Dr. Saunders' sexual advances and in a heated exchange, Topher reveals that he had not programmed her to hate him. He only programmed her to disagree with him so that they would not miss "something" that could potentially hurt the dolls. The decision to hate was made only by Dr. Saunders. She subsequently breaks down under this information and Topher tries to comfort her. It is revealed that she chose not to find out who she was in "Omega" because she does not want to give the body back to the original personality, thereby "dying" as Whiskey/Saunders.

Echo's husband confronts Echo with the picture of her and Paul Ballard. She is struck in the head and this seemingly triggers her past imprints. As she is about to talk herself out of her situation she states that she is Eleanor Penn (from "Ghost"). She is subsequently confused about her state of mind. Echo's husband then goes to make his arms deal, bringing Echo with him. Ballard follows her and calls Topher who notices spikes in her feed and is alarmed that her handler did not call it. Ballard goes in by himself and then accuses Echo of failing the engagement and strikes her several times, trying to make her recall the "fighter" imprint from "Man on the Street". They are able to disable all the guards and stop the arms deal.

Dr. Saunders leaves the Dollhouse, leaving a note for Boyd saying "I'm running out of excuses". Victor's scars have fully healed and he and Sierra are seen holding hands walking together. Echo reveals to Ballard that she can recall her imprints, even hear them, but she knows none of them are her real self and she asks for help from Ballard. He then takes up the offer from Adelle and becomes her new handler.

== Production ==
Material was filmed for this episode featuring Mag (Felicia Day), Zone (Zack Ward) and the child imprinted with Caroline's personality (Adair Tishler), set in the dystopic future of "Epitaph One". The scenes were cut because "Vows" was "long and crowded with information", but the material was eventually used, along with newly shot footage, in the series finale, "Epitaph Two: Return".

== Reception ==
=== Reviews ===
Hercules from Ain't It Cool News said that Vows was "funny, suspenseful, sexy and willing to kick around more than a few Very Big Ideas..." and that the episode "roughly triples my investment in this series' fate." Eric Goldman from IGN said "Dollhouse definitely feels stronger now than it did in Season 1, with a more layered story going on..." He went on to praise the Saunders/Whiskey storyline and Amy Acker in particular, saying it "included some of the most emotional and complex material this show has dealt with so far, all of which is terrifically performed by Amy Acker."

=== Ratings ===
When originally broadcast, "Vows" was viewed by 2.56 million viewers, down 41% from the series premiere, but almost on par with the first season finale, which was broadcast in May 2009. It received a 1.0/3 ratings share among adults 18-49.
