= Whedonesque.com =

Weblog regarding Joss Whedon's works (2002–2021)

- Whedonesque main page
- Website type: Online discussion
- Dissolved: February 11, 2021; 5 years ago
- Owner: Caroline van Oosten de Boer
- Creator: Various contributors
- Website: http://whedonesque.com
- Commercial: No
- Registration: Required to comment
- Launched: June 2002; 24 years ago
- Current status: Inactive

Whedonesque.com (also referred to as Whedonesque) was a collaborative weblog devoted to the works of Joss Whedon. Submissions of new content ended on August 21, 2017, following the publication of an open letter by Whedon's ex-wife Kai Cole. The site was taken offline in 2021. At its inception in 2002, Whedonesque covered Buffy the Vampire Slayer and Angel, but expanded to follow Whedon's professional output, as well as the careers of cast and crew associated with Whedon projects. Since 2004, the site has been recognized in other media outlets by awards and citations of Whedon's writings originally posted to Whedonesque.

Beyond simply being an informational site, Whedonesque has been referenced in books and cited in academic papers. It was used by marketers to drum up interest in Buffy products and by comic book editors to gauge reader reactions. Whedon has occasionally posted his personal political views to the site, such as during the 2007–2008 Writers Guild of America strike. This led some to mistakenly believe that Whedonesque was Whedon's personal or official site and prompted some fans to take up the writers' cause.

== History ==
=== Origin: 2002 through 2003 ===
Whedonesque was started in mid-2002 by Caroline van Oosten de Boer and Milo Vermeulen. Whedonesque started with a set of rules designed to mandate linking to external sites, encourage civil conduct, discourage copyright violations, and minimize discussion of perpetually contentious issues. The first print media mention of Whedonesque was a one sentence blurb in USA Today a month after its launch. In 2003, it was cited as one of two top Buffy Internet sites in an article commemorating the show's end.

=== Growth: 2004 through 2006 ===
The site's popularity grew even further once Whedon himself started posting. Whedon first acknowledged reading Whedonesque in late 2004, and the account 'joss' was created for his use on August 15, 2004. Whedon's first post directly to the site was on April 27, 2005, announcing preview screenings of Serenity. He later extended his involvement, using the site as a means of communication with fans on topics including his own fandom of Veronica Mars, the canonicity of Buffy Season 8 comic books, and status updates on his projects. Through the use of tagging, Whedonesque maintains a list of threads Whedon has started or in which he has posted. In 2006, Angel: After the Fall comic book author Brian Lynch began posting to Whedonesque as well.

Late 2004 saw the first two recognitions of Whedonesque.com by major Internet media. On November 22, 2004, Whedonesque was selected as SciFi.com's Site of the Week, which commented "first-rate weblog on all things Joss-related" that "has very clearly laid-out guidelines for posting and a solid policy on how to label spoilers." On December 14, 2004 USA Today's Pop Candy selected "the Whedonesque gang" as the 70th of its "top 100 people of 2004", calling it "... comforting to visit Whedonesque.com each day, where piles of links are posted by my fellow Joss Whedon obsessives." In 2005, Whedonesque was cited as a case study in marketing success.

=== Recognition: 2007 through 2008 ===
In early 2007, Whedon announced the end of his relationship with the Wonder Woman movie in a Whedonesque post, which was directly cited in traditional media, including Reuters, the Los Angeles Times, and industry press. That year Whedonesque was also cited in much more modest coverage of Whedon's involvement with Runaways and The Office. In February 2008, Whedonesque was cited as a source in a New York Times piece on Steven Brust's Firefly novel, My Own Kind of Freedom. Later that year, Whedonesque was cited in mainstream media treatment of Dollhouse (especially Whedon's post explaining the new pilot) and Dr. Horrible's Sing-Along Blog. The site was taken offline for a day by the attention prompted by the release of Dr. Horrible, resulting in the site's movement from Pair.com, where it had originated, to Mediatemple.net. Unlike previous mainstream media mentions, Dollhouse and Dr. Horrible have garnered Whedonesque mainland European media attention. In August 2008, Wired cited Whedonesque in its coverage of the YouTube leak of a demo reel for the never-produced Buffy: The Animated Series.

At the same time as major media outlets began noting Whedonesque.com as a source, it also received more recognitions, including The Times Online's Blog of the Week, awarded to Whedonesque on March 4, 2006. The Times review stated that "All the latest news items, rumours and sightings concerning the one-time wonder boy and the creator of Buffy the Vampire Slayer are logged daily by the kind of people who appreciate smart, sophisticated dialogue and plotting." Whedonesque won SyFy Portal's Genre Award for Best Web Site of 2006, and was nominated for same award in 2007, 2008 and 2009. Entertainment Weekly selected Whedonesque as one of the 100 Greatest Websites on December 20, 2007. In May 2008, EW selected Whedonesque as eighth on their list of 25 Essential Fansites, calling it "a reservoir of material about anyone who's starred in (or, it would seem, breathed near) his nerd-magnet projects: Buffy, Angel, and Firefly/Serenity."

Whedon has used Whedonesque as a personal blog, comparing the Stoning of Du'a Khalil Aswad to the Captivity advertising controversy. He also posted multiple messages during the 2007–2008 Writers Guild of America strike. While Whedon has no official website, that role is sometimes erroneously attributed to Whedonesque.com, while other media outlets scrupulously describe the relationship between Whedon and the site.

=== Institution and close: 2009 through 2021 ===
In 2009, media websites continued to cite Whedonesque in discussions of Whedon's work. In coverage of Dollhouse, Anna Pickard of The Guardian's "TV & Radio Blog" called Whedonesque the "ultimate Joss-fansite" and later quoted van Oosten de Boer and another Whedonesque administrator in a follow-up piece, while Rick Porter of Zap2it referred to it as "the clearinghouse for all things Joss". While an account for frequent Whedon collaborator Tim Minear had been created in 2005, Minear himself first began posting to Whedonesque in March, 2009. One of his first posts, regarding the "Epitaph One" episode of Dollhouse, was quoted by The Washington Post.

On August 21, 2017, moderators announced that the website would be closing down and would eventually become a read-only site. The decision was made shortly after Kai Cole, Whedon's ex-wife, wrote an essay accusing Whedon of numerous affairs, including emotional affairs, and of hypocrisy regarding his espousal of feminist ideals. The announcement requested that users wishing to mark the site's closure donate to organizations or charities supporting treatment of complex post-traumatic stress disorder, which Cole wrote she was treated for, after the revelations of Whedon's infidelity. Moderators announced that the fansite's Twitter account will remain active.

On February 11, 2021, the site was taken offline following a tweet by Buffy the Vampire Slayer and Angel actress Charisma Carpenter detailing abusive treatment by Joss Whedon during her time on both shows. Carpenter's claims were supported by Buffy the Vampire Slayer alum Amber Benson, Sarah Michelle Gellar, and Michelle Trachtenberg.

== Impact ==
=== Books and academic papers ===
In addition to news outlets which have picked up stories and quotes from Whedonesque, the site has been referenced in a number of books and academic papers. It is cited as a general reference in The Physics of the Buffyverse and the Angel guide Once Bitten. Specific URL citations to Whedonesque posts are included in Reading Angel. Likewise, the academic Buffy studies journal Slayage has included papers which cited Whedonesque in issues 16, 22, 23, and 25. The issue 22 reference included URLs to specific topics and posts, which have been "permalinks" since the site's inception. In September 2007, Whedonesque was one website cited in an MIT masters' thesis entitled Television 2.0: Reconceptualizing TV as an Engagement Medium.

There has been a positive reaction at Whedonesque to academic interest in Buffy and other Whedon works. Whedonesque maintains a category for "academic" posts, which includes notices of public lectures, calls for papers, and academic analyses of Whedon projects. A separate category is maintained for Whedonesque posts about Slayage content.

=== Marketing and fandom ===
Even though site owner van Oosten de Boer stated that Whedonesque is "there to provide a service, not to influence anyone." the site has been recognized by vendors as a place to gauge fan reactions to merchandise. In April, 2008, Dark Horse Comics said it would release images of a later-cancelled Buffy the Vampire Slayer tarot card set exclusively through Whedonesque. Buffy Season 8 comic editor Scott Allie wrote in his editorial column that he read Whedonesque for reactions to Buffy's same-sex encounter in issue 12, while Duke University Press credits Whedonesque with helping to sell its Undead TV: Essays on "Buffy the Vampire Slayer".

Whedonesque was one of six fan websites featured in Click Critics: The Power of Fan Websites, held May 19, 2008 at The Paley Center for Media in New York. Other attendees included Lostpedia and Television Without Pity. The event highlighted six popular fan-run websites focused on current media. One participant remarked that "The Paley Center itself is trying kind of hard to figure out what this whole blogging thing is, and doesn’t quite get it, as evidenced by the fact that no urls appeared in the program for the event."

=== 2007–2008 Writers Guild of America strike ===
In late 2007, Whedon's posts about the 2007–2008 Writers Guild of America strike prompted reader support for the writers which grew into a multi-fandom movement dubbed Fans4Writers. The Wall Street Journal noted this novel use of Whedonesque and similar sites. Rolling Stone featured Whedonesque.com as one of four websites mentioned in "The Best Strike Writing" and Buffy writer Jane Espenson specifically credited Whedonesque readers for providing pizza to the striking writers.
