= Epitaph Two: Return =

- Dollhouse episode
- Episode no.: Season 2 Episode 13
- Directed by: David Solomon
- Written by: Maurissa Tancharoen; Jed Whedon; Andrew Chambliss
- Production code: 2APK13
- Original air date: January 29, 2010

Episode chronology
← Previous "The Hollow Men"	Next → —
- Dollhouse (season 2)

"Epitaph Two: Return" is the 13th episode of the second season, the show's 26th episode overall and the series finale of the American science fiction television series Dollhouse. The episode was written by Maurissa Tancharoen, Jed Whedon, Andrew Chambliss, and directed by David Solomon. It aired in the United States on Fox on January 29, 2010.

The episode was scheduled to air on January 22, 2010, but was subsequently delayed a week due to a joint telethon with ABC, CBS, NBC, and The CW, for Haiti.

"Epitaph Two: Return" did not use a title sequence. Instead it uses footage from "Epitaph One" to set the story, followed by the intertitle. However the intertitle does not possess the pods in the background as it has during the series, instead electing for just a plain black background.

This episode is set in 2020. After travelling from Los Angeles, Zone, Mag and Caroline have reached Safe Haven. Topher, who has been rescued after being forced to work for Rossum, is close to finishing a plan that will restore the world population's original personas. However, everyone must return to the Dollhouse to complete this plan.

This episode is successor to "Epitaph One", which was un-aired in the United States.

== Plot ==
As the episode begins, it is the year 2020, and Mag, Zone and Caroline (a ten-year-old girl imprinted with Caroline Farrell's personality) escape a raid by several Butchers and continue trying to make their way to safety. However, they are shortly kidnapped and brought to Neuropolis, formerly Tucson, Arizona. They are quickly locked up in a cell with other possible actuals or dumbshows (wiped personas).

Mr. Ambrose, who is in a new body, informs Mr. Harding (also in a new body) that they have found suitable candidates for Harding to upgrade to. As Harding inspects the bodies, he sees one of them is Ballard who is posing as a dumbshow. Harding runs out of the room, leaving Ballard to take out Mr. Ambrose. Shortly, Echo appears in the cells and takes out the guards, before killing Harding.

Ballard finds Topher, whose condition has drastically deteriorated since the episode "Epitaph One". He was kidnapped and forced to work for Rossum, who shot one person each day Topher didn't complete his task, developing a tech to wipe the entire planet. In a moment of clarity, Topher claims "he can bring back the world" - revert everyone to their original personalities.

At Safe Haven, Adelle and Priya (formerly Sierra) live with Priya's son "T". They start dinner, but Echo and Ballard arrive bringing Zone, Mag, Caroline and Topher with them. Echo explains Rossum's latest agenda and Ballard tells them about Topher's idea. Echo and Caroline are convinced Topher's plan can work. However, Echo believes that because they possess the Active architecture, they will be reset to their original selves. This is undesirable for Priya as she would lose memories of her son, for Ballard who could be returned to his brain-dead state, and for Echo, who needs to keep her memories so she can still fight the war.

Ballard believes that in order to survive and for Topher to finish the tech, they must return to the Dollhouse and hide there for at least a year to escape the effect of the worldwide "reset". The group will need guides, meaning Zone and Mag will have to come too. Zone is reluctant to go back, but Adelle threatens Zone once again. An alarm sounds and the group takes arms to defend themselves, but it turns out to be Anthony (still known as Victor) and his crew responding to a call from Echo. Victor and his crew (including former dolls such as Kilo and Romeo) are equipped with a new tech that allows them to swap out different skill sets with the use of a hand-held imprinting device and store their excess skill data on USB flash drives. Priya is not happy to be reunited with Victor, as she has been trying to keep T away from the imprinting tech, and is reluctant to leave. However, the groups join forces to reach the Dollhouse.

When their truck reaches the city, the group has to fight through several butchers to enter the Dollhouse, and Mag is shot in the legs. While tending to her, Ballard is killed by a stray shot to the head. Victor and Echo rappel down into the Dollhouse and find it inhabited, all of its residents having been wiped. Alpha appears and explains that he saw people that needed help and settled at the Dollhouse.

Echo and Adelle search Topher's office for the tech required to finish his device but find nothing. Victor's crew soon turn their weapons on Topher, explaining they don't want to give up their imprints, and plan to use the Dollhouse to get further upgrades and rule the Wasteland. Victor and Alpha walk in and both attempt to talk the crew down. When this fails, Alpha, Victor, and Echo surprise the crew, disarm them, and place them in isolation.

In Topher's office, Alpha begins to build Topher's device, while Topher longingly watches a video of Bennett Halverson explaining Imprinting 101. Alpha finishes the device, and Adelle asks where they will set it off. Topher says that height is crucial, and Adelle suggests her old office. Topher agrees, and in the midst of his babbling, says the "explosion" will set off a chain reaction. Adelle, who knows the device must be set manually, realizes that Topher does not intend to come back.

Priya introduces T to his father. Zone tells Mag he will take Caroline to the surface and watch over her after she is restored to her original self, while Mag will stay behind.

As Adelle, Caroline, Zone, and the residents wait outside, Topher arrives in Adelle's old office and assembles the device. He takes one last look around and spots the "To Remember" wall. The device goes off causing an explosion and sending a pulse out. The residents and Caroline collapse, awaking shortly with their original personalities.

Echo makes her way back to the chair. An envelope with her name printed on it has been left on the chair, and Echo opens it to find a wedge. She puts it in the chair and imprints herself. It is revealed that the wedge contains Ballard's imprint. They talk in Echo's mind, and Ballard asks if Echo has the room for him. Echo says they will work through it. She walks to the pod room, and comes to rest inside a pod as the series ends.

== Writing ==
Many of the characters' fates in the show have been left open.

As in "Epitaph One", the fate of Whiskey (Amy Acker) was left open in the final scenes. In this episode, there is no mention of her by Alpha after he has taken over the Dollhouse. It is unknown whether she too succumbed to the gas at "Epitaph One"'s end, whether she was eventually killed by butchers or imprinted again and released into the world by Alpha.

Alpha's fate has also been left open. Before Topher's explosive goes off, Alpha decides to leave the Dollhouse, as he is afraid that those who stay in the dollhouse will be restored to their original personalities. He wants to be alone when this happens, as he is afraid that his original personality (that of a killer) will come back and he is afraid to be around others in the event it happens. Echo has her doubts that he will revert to his original self or even serial killer like instincts due to his composite events (thus being similar to Echo in their ability to resist being wiped). It is unknown if Alpha decides to stay underground and keep his imprints or succumbs to Topher's device, thus potentially being wiped.

Similarly, the fates of Dominic and Ivy were left open; thus it is assumed that they either died in the years between "The Hollow Men" and "Epitaph One", been wiped, or were hiding in another location. However, Dominic's scenes with Adelle in "Epitaph One", in which he was taken out of the attic (which takes place after "The Hollow Men" but before the 2019 timeline established in "Epitaph One"), give the impression that he survived the wounds received in "The Hollow Men" and lived past 2010.

The scene in which Echo imprints herself with Ballard raises some questions. During the episode, Alpha asks Adelle for a favor. This favor is never revealed on screen. As Echo talks to Ballard, she mentions she is letting Ballard "in", a reference to what Ballard was saying earlier. It is implied that Alpha mapped Ballard's imprint from his own brain and left it on the chair for Echo to find, although it is possible that the wedge left is the one Topher reconstructed to save Ballard.

== Casting ==
- Although credited, Harry Lennix does not appear in this episode.
- Rossum executive Clive Ambrose, previously played by Philip Casnoff, is shown in a new body portrayed by Nate Dushku, Eliza Dushku's older brother. Matthew Harding, played by recurring actor Keith Carradine, is now portrayed by Noah Harpster.
- Episode co-writers Maurissa Tancharoen and Jed Whedon make appearances in the episode. Tancharoen appears as Active Kilo in her third appearance, and Whedon in a non-speaking role during the dinner sequence at Safe Haven.

== Reception ==
=== Viewership ===
This episode was watched by 2.16 million viewers, up from the previous episode.

=== Reviews ===
Rachel Reitsleff from iF Magazine said, overall the episode "wraps everything up, not perfectly, but satisfactorily and, for the most part, with surprisingly good heart." She goes onto say "surprising amount of genuine sweetness", citing the "human frisson finally generated between Paul and Echo and an honest to goodness happy ending for true lovers Priya and Anthony. Kranz is honestly heartbreaking as the shattered Topher, Williams is warmly protective of him and everybody does a fine job." Rachel also praises the director, David Solomon, citing his use of lighting with the night time battle in Los Angeles. She also praises the writers, again citing the downfall of having to fit so much of the storyline into just one episode. Eric Goldman of IGN gave the episode a 7.3. He said "Dollhouse is over, and I can't say I'm exactly in anguish over its loss." He noted that "The Hollow Men" was the episode that wrapped up the storylines and that a return to the future was "a very cool, intriguing installment of the show". However he also said that the episode was silly and "suffered from way too much invented slang and "future speak", that felt forced and awkward. Hearing someone [sic] things like "Log off!" sounds silly when it's in the context of a world that shouldn't be that out of our reach."
