= The Hollow Men (Dollhouse) =

- Dollhouse episode
- Episode no.: Season 2 Episode 12
- Directed by: Terrence O'Hara
- Written by: Michele Fazekas; Tara Butters; Tracy Bellomo
- Production code: 2APK12
- Original air date: January 15, 2010

Episode chronology
← Previous "Getting Closer"	Next → "Epitaph Two: Return"
- Dollhouse (season 2)

"The Hollow Men" is the 12th episode of the second season of the American science fiction television series Dollhouse and the show's 25th episode overall. The episode was written by Michele Fazekas, Tara Butters, and Tracy Bellomo, and directed by Terrence O'Hara. It aired in the United States on Fox on January 15, 2010.

This episode immediately follows "Getting Closer". As such the group head to Tucson, where the Rossum Headquarters is, to take down the mainframe.

== Plot ==
In a flashback set two years ago, Caroline is coerced by Boyd to join the Dollhouse.

Presently, Ballard waits with DeWitt for the others to arrive. Ballard checks to see how Mellie is doing after her tracking device was removed. A vehicle arrives with Boyd, Topher, and Echo, who is bewildered and incoherent; Boyd sedates her.

Inside the Dollhouse, Anthony and Priya go to the security office to retrieve surveillance footage, but all the hard drives have been taken. Heeding a note on the imprinting chair, Anthony is imprinted with Topher 2.0 ("The Left Hand").

The group arrives at Rossum Headquarters and are greeted by Clyde 2.0 in the body of Dr. Saunders/Whiskey.

Topher 2.0 reveals he installed his own camera in the office and plays back the footage, exposing that Boyd had injected Echo as she was being imprinted. They realise that Boyd is working for Rossum.

Ballard, Mellie, Topher and Boyd are locked in a room. Boyd takes Topher with him to go after Echo and says that Ballard and Mellie will be responsible for taking down the mainframe.

Topher 2.0 says he will sacrifice himself and give Anthony back his body and additional abilities, including combat and computer skills.

As Boyd and Topher make their way around Rossum Headquarters, Topher explains that somebody inside the Dollhouse must have betrayed them due to similarities in the symptoms of Echo and Priya when she was drugged by Nolan ("Belonging"). Inside the Dollhouse, Anthony's persona has been restored and they decide to leave for Tucson.

In Rossum Headquarters, Echo realises it is Boyd who has betrayed them. Topher and Boyd stumble upon a lab. Topher recognises his tech; Boyd tries to use one, but it is non-functioning. Topher sees that Rossum is weaponizing the tech and attempts to destroy it, but Boyd convinces Topher to fix one unit.

Ballard and Mellie make their way to a weapons cache. Topher explains an easy fix for the tech and Boyd reveals his duplicity. Echo jumps in and beats Boyd to the floor, but is stopped by Clyde 2.0 who threatens to kill DeWitt. Mellie and Ballard decide to destroy the cooling unit for the mainframe, overheating and destroying the servers.

Boyd says that once Rossum executes their plan they will likely be imprinted and enslaved. He explains that the technology cannot be un-invented, and that Echo is their saviour because of her spinal fluid, which can be farmed and used to make people immune to imprinting. Boyd then knocks Echo out with a disruptor.

Mellie and Ballard destroy the cooling system, but the alarms go off. Boyd uses a recording of her activation code and Mellie almost kills Ballard. When Mellie briefly regains control, she kills herself.

Echo has been strapped down and Boyd attempts to use the neural lock and key but Echo rebuffs him. Anthony and Priya arrive and free Echo, who orders them to rescue DeWitt and Topher while she finishes shutting down the Rossum labs. As Echo looks for a way to destroy the labs, she runs into Clyde 2.0, and they fight; she knocks him out.

Ballard runs into Boyd, who, having been separated from the group, does not know what is going on. Boyd tells Ballard that DeWitt turned on them, then turns his weapon on Ballard and holds him hostage. Echo shoots Ballard in the leg to give herself a free shot at Boyd. The plan fails as Boyd rushes down onto Echo and they engage in a fist fight. Topher arrives, turning Boyd into a doll.

Echo straps Boyd with explosives and hands him a grenade, ordering him to walk into the mainframe and pull the pin when she leaves the room. The building is evacuated and the explosion destroys the labs.

Ten years later, Echo and Ballard are fighting through the streets of an apocalyptic Los Angeles. Rossum was ultimately successful in deploying the mind-wiping tech.

== Reception ==
=== Reviews ===
Jevon Phillips from Los Angeles Times said "viewers were probably a bit more on edge knowing that Boyd Langton was the puppet master and having to watch him guide the team around." Rachel Reitsleff from iF Magazine said the episode had "lots of action, lots of emotion, and lots of exposition in an eventful episode." She did praise the performances of Lennix and Acker in their roles as Boyd and Clyde respectively, citing "Lennix is menacing and weirdly sweet as Boyd shows his emotions even while threatening his erstwhile friends, and Acker plays the self-confident Clyde with relish in a bit of plotting that makes great use of the actress." She also notes the speed of the episode saying "due to the series’ cancellation, storylines that seem as though they could have sustained a whole season are resolved in an episode, which requires what feel like long monologues from a number of characters." Eric Goldman of IGN gave the episode a 6.3. He noted that though the previous episodes had given the show much momentum, and in regards to the show's rushed deadline, "it's still difficult to not find this episode lacking." Goldman also commented on the inconstancy and the infallibility of Boyd's betrayal, stating how "it just didn't add up."

This episode was praised in particular for its acting, notably from Harry Lennix (Boyd), and Enver Gjokaj (Anthony), commenting particularly that "Enver Gjokaj is a wonderful actor and did an amazing job mimicking Fran Kranz."
