= Adair Tishler =

American actress

- Occupations: Actress; model; singer; student
- Years active: 2003–2010, 2022–present

Adair Tishler is an American actress, model and singer, who has appeared in television shows such as Charmed and House and in movies such as Within and An American Girl: Chrissa Stands Strong. She is also known for portraying Molly Walker on NBC's Heroes.

== Career ==
Tishler has participated in theater productions of Cinderella and Sound of Music. Her résumé includes voice-over work, and she has also performed in music videos—she appears in Martina McBride's video God's Will and in Rhonda Vincent's video If Heartaches Had Wings which also featured pop-star and actress Miley Cyrus.

Her other performances include the role of Carrie in the short indie film Six and the City, a knock-off of the hit TV show Sex and the City. Tishler has also appeared in the hit WB series Charmed in its final season. She portrayed Tara James in the American Girl movie Chrissa Stands Strong.

Adair used to sing lead vocals for the indie rock band Smash It Up. Tishler sang with four of her middle school friends from Burbank, California: Cole Clarke (lead guitar), Brennan Flynn (bass guitar), Mia Viesca (drums). The band released a self-titled CD of original songs on April 21, 2009.

== Awards ==
She won a Young Artist Award in 2008 for Best Performance in a TV Series - Supporting Young Actress for her performance in Heroes.

== Filmography ==
| Year | Title | Role | Notes |
|---|---|---|---|
| 2003 | Sex and the City | Carrie | Short film |
| 2003 | Paper Doll | Young Natasha | Short film |
| 2004 | Ms. Goldman | Haley Davis | Short film |
| 2005 | The White Horse Is Dead | Young Naya | |
| 2005 | House | Nikki | Episode: "The Mistake" |
| 2006 | E-Ring | Ivan's Daughter | Episode: "War Crimes" |
| 2006 | Pop Star | Shana | Short film |
| 2006 | Charmed | Phoebe's Daughter | Episode: "The Jung and the Restless" |
| 2006 | A Dead Calling | Mary | Video |
| 2006-2008 | Heroes | Molly Walker | 16 episodes |
| 2007 | Ten Inch Hero | Julia | |
| 2007 | Ruthless | Lex | Short film |
| 2007 | Saving Grace | Violet | Episode: "Bless Me, Father, for I Have Sinned" |
| 2007 | The Sarah Silverman Program | Young Laura | Episode: "Doody" |
| 2008 | Your Name Here | 8 Year Old Laura | |
| 2008 | The Cleaner | Maggie Mullins | Episode: "Lie with Me" |
| 2008 | Farm House | Young Scarlet | |
| 2008 | Grey's Anatomy | Tori Begler | Episode: "Life During Wartime" |
| 2009 | An American Girl: Chrissa Stands Strong | Tara James | Video |
| 2009 | Born That Way | Young Bridgette | Video |
| 2009 | Criminal Minds | Cate Hale | Episode: "Bloodline" |
| 2009 | Within | Hazel Marie | |
| 2009-2010 | Dollhouse | Iris Miller / Caroline Farrell | Episodes: "Epitaph One" & "Epitaph Two: Return" |
| 2010 | Jack and the Beanstalk | Rapunzel | |
| 2022 | Limitless | Daisy | Short film |
