= Echo (Dollhouse episode) =

Original unaired pilot of Dollhouse television series

- Dollhouse episode
- Episode no.: Season 1 Episode 0
- Directed by: Joss Whedon
- Written by: Joss Whedon
- Production code: 1APK79
- Original air date: Unaired

Episode chronology
← Previous —	Next → "Ghost"

"Echo" is the original unaired pilot episode of the Fox television series Dollhouse. It was officially released on the season one DVD set. It was reshot and many scenes from it were taken and inserted into later episodes. It is not considered canon in terms of the show's mythology; however, many subsequent reviewers have noted that it was a superior pilot to the one aired.

It is one of three episodes of the series that were both written and directed by the series creator Joss Whedon.

FBI Agent Paul Ballard gets new wind in his investigation of the mysterious Dollhouse when he receives a photo of a woman named Caroline. Adelle DeWitt and the dolls' handlers become nervous when the dolls begin to show signs of self-awareness.

== Plot summary ==
Echo is an Active, a member of the elite and secretive Dollhouse, an agency that has revolutionized memory-science. The Actives (colloquially known as "dolls") are individuals whose original personality and memory has been completely wiped clean, allowing the programmers of the Dollhouse to "imprint" them with entirely new personalities tailor-made to fit a client's needs.

In the beginning of the episode, Echo completes three different assignments: first, she stops a young girl from allowing her drug dealer to pimp her out, leads her into rehab and reunites her with her family; second, she becomes the dream date for a rich man at his ex's wedding in order to make his ex jealous; and third, she becomes a middleman negotiator for a business deal between two warring Spanish gangs.

At the end of this she returns to the Dollhouse, which is a serene, Asian-influenced building that keeps the Actives in a spa-like state that emphasizes physical health: whole foods, swimming pools, massages, yoga and tai chi classes, bonzai tree pruning, tranquil water features. Echo spends her day in the pool while Adelle DeWitt, the head of the Los Angeles Dollhouse, explains the purpose of the Actives to a prospective rich client:

"You're a man who can have everything he wants. If what you want is someone dressed up as a cheerleader telling you how big you are, you can hire a hundred women to do that -- quite convincingly -- for the price of one day with an Active. This is not what you want. This is about what you need. An Active doesn't judge. This will be the purest, most genuine human encounter of your life...and hers. It is a treasure; one I guarantee you will never, never forget."

Over the course of the episode, the inner workings of the Dollhouse are further revealed, introducing the main characters of the show: Topher Brink, the Dollhouse's cheerfully immoral programmer who suffers from a god-complex; Boyd Langton, Echo's handler who is an ex-cop and is shown to be somewhat repulsed and disgusted by what he does; Dr. Claire Saunders, the Dollhouse's doctor whose face is scarred and who argues for better treatment for the Actives; and Adelle DeWitt, the leader of the Dollhouse who sees what she does as a beneficial arrangement for both clients and Actives.

The pilot also introduces FBI Agent Paul Ballard, who has taken over the Dollhouse investigation even though he is laughed at by his fellow agents for actually believing in the assignment. Ballard has allowed the Dollhouse to completely consume his entire life and even admits further in the episode that his wife left him over his obsession.

Ballard's conflict is further intensified when he attempts to shake out a lead from a Russian mobster named Lubov who is apparently involved with a family that specializes in sex trafficking between America and Europe. Lubov sends him on a wild goose chase, only for it be revealed later in the episode that Lubov is in fact an Active named Victor who DeWitt and her head of security, Lawrence Dominic, sent to Ballard to throw him off the Dollhouse's tail.

Topher and DeWitt become increasingly nervous as they see Echo in particular appear to be evolving in her "blank slate" state in between wipes—showing increasing capacity for memory, friendship, and an ability to ask questions and display curiosity. She and her fellow Actives Victor and Sierra eat lunch together daily as well as have conversations outside of appropriate boundaries. When Ballard receives a photograph of Echo before she arrived at the Dollhouse with the cryptic label "Caroline -- keep looking" scrawled on the back, DeWitt decides that something must be done.

Ballard follows a lead given to him by Lubov to look in an abandoned building, where he meets Echo, who introduces herself as Shauna Vickers, a girl whose sister has been rumored to be caught up by the Dollhouse. She tells Ballard a story about how the police and the FBI have quit searching for her and refuse to follow any Dollhouse-related leads. Ballard takes her to his apartment and interviews her further.

He then draws his gun on her and says that she is "exactly what he needed to hear at exactly the right time" which he posits as being completely unbelievable. In response, Echo disarms him and aims the gun directly at him. Ballard, following instinct, asks her "Are you Caroline?" A flicker of stunned emotion goes across Echo's face before she pulls the trigger.

When Ballard is revealed to be alive and in the hospital, Echo, still imprinted as a mercenary, breaks away from her handler to finish the job, but at the hospital she sees the girl that she had helped in a previous imprint earlier in the episode, which causes another flash of confused feeling that allows Boyd to catch up to her and take her back to the Dollhouse when DeWitt commands him to stop her.

At the end of the episode, DeWitt comments that something happened in the apartment that neither she nor Langton knows about, saying that while Echo knew exactly where to shoot to kill her target, she also knew exactly where not to shoot. She informs Langton to keep an eye on her, leaving Ballard now more determined than ever to find the Dollhouse and find Echo/Caroline. At the end of the episode, when all of the Actives are led to their sleeping chambers, when the protective glass closes over Echo, leaving her in private, she whispers "Caroline."

== Removal ==
"Echo" was eventually completely dropped from the official Dollhouse episode list and was later taken apart so that different scenes could be used in later episodes. During an interview given on October 26, 2009, creator/writer/director Joss Whedon stated:

"The original pilot was in fact thrown out. Again, at my behest. Once it became clear what paradigm the network was shooting for, it just didn't fit at all, even after I'd reshot more than half of it... To get a sense of how completely turned around I was during this process, you should know there was a scene with Eliza and the astonishing Ashley Johnson that I wrote and shot completely differently three different times, with different characters in different places (actually I wrote it closer to eight times), and none of it will ever see air. Which is as it should be (though I'm determined to get Ms. Johnson back in the future)."

The network eventually asked for a "five-pilot" set-up, making the first five episodes of season one essentially standalone episodes with little overall plot development. "Ghost" became the season one premiere episode.

Ashley Johnson returned to Dollhouse in the season one finale "Omega".

== Reception ==
The original script of "Echo" was made available to critics in April 2008, before initial production began. The script was praised by critics, who called it "fabulous," "thought-provoking," and "a beautiful enigma wrapped in a riddle, a gripping conspiracy story for the ages filled with urban legends, memory tampering, and long-buried secrets coming to the fore."

"[It] builds into a mystery that's as much philosophical as science fiction...[it] mixes elements of the conspiracy thriller with what threatens to become a profound meditation on identity." The script was furthermore praised as being "Whedon's most accessible work to date" and "much more than preaching to the converted."

When the episode itself was made available for viewing, one critic commented "[it is a] solid opener [with] huge potential for fun (...) which people aren't yet aware of -- and heartbreak people aren't expecting."
