= Dollhouse (TV series) =

American television series

- Genre: Science fiction; Thriller; Psychological thriller; Cyberpunk; Drama
- Created by: Joss Whedon
- Starring: Eliza Dushku; Harry Lennix; Fran Kranz; Tahmoh Penikett; Enver Gjokaj; Dichen Lachman; Olivia Williams
- Theme music composer: Jonatha Brooke; Eric Bazilian
- Opening theme: "What You Don't Know"
- Composers: Mychael Danna; Rob Simonsen
- Country of origin: United States
- Original language: English
- No. of seasons: 2
- No. of episodes: 26 (list of episodes)

Production
- Executive producers: Joss Whedon; David Solomon; Tim Minear
- Producers: Eliza Dushku; Elizabeth Craft; Sarah Fain; Steven S. DeKnight; Jane Espenson; Michele Fazekas; Tara Butters
- Production location: Los Angeles
- Running time: 47–50 minutes (Season 1); 42 minutes (Season 2)
- Production companies: Mutant Enemy Productions; 20th Century Fox Television

Original release
- Network: Fox
- Release: February 13, 2009 – January 29, 2010

Dollhouse is an American science fiction television series created by writer and director Joss Whedon. Produced by Mutant Enemy Productions in association with 20th Century Fox Television, the show premiered on February 13, 2009, on the Fox network, and was canceled on November 11, 2009. The final episode aired on January 29, 2010. Production wrapped in December 2009, with a total of 27 episodes produced including the original pilot.

The show revolves around a corporation running numerous underground establishments (known as "Dollhouses") around the globe that program individuals referred to as Actives (or Dolls) with temporary personalities and skills. Wealthy clients hire Actives from Dollhouses at great expense for various purposes, including heists, sexual encounters, assassinations, expert counsel, and all manner of unique experiences. The series primarily follows the Active known as Echo, played by Eliza Dushku, on her journey toward self-awareness. Dushku also served as series producer.

Dollhouse received mixed reviews and underwhelming ratings. The series was renewed for a second season but cancelled before production of that season was complete.

== Plot ==
The story follows Echo (Eliza Dushku), a "doll" or "Active" for the Los Angeles "Dollhouse", one of several facilities, called "Houses", run by a company which hires out human beings to wealthy clients. These "engagements" range from romantic interludes to high-risk criminal enterprises. Each Active has their original memories wiped and exists in a childlike blank state until programmed via the insertion of new memories and personalities for each mission. Actives such as Echo are ostensibly volunteers who have surrendered their minds and bodies to the organization for five-year stints, during which their original personalities are saved on hard drives, in exchange for vast amounts of money and solutions to any other problematic circumstances in their lives.^{E-1} Echo is unique, however, in that she remembers small amounts even after personality "wipes", and gradually develops an increasingly cognizant self-awareness and personality that's resistant to erasure. This concept allows the series to examine the notions of identity and personhood.^{E-12}

Within The House, opinions on such matters are divided. Dollhouse director Adelle DeWitt (Olivia Williams) sees her role as merely giving people what they need; programmer Topher Brink (Fran Kranz) is initially entirely scientific and amoral, apart from brief flashes of moral quandary; while Echo's mentor in The House or "handler", Boyd Langton (Harry Lennix), an ex-cop with an unknown past, expresses concern with the ethical and theological implications of the Dollhouse's technology, using his inside role as an opportunity to limit any collateral damage. Raising intriguing questions about personality and selfhood are other dolls Victor (Enver Gjokaj) and Sierra (Dichen Lachman), who despite being continually re-wiped, begin to fall in love and retain those feelings whether wiped or imprinted with other personalities.^{E-8}

Meanwhile, FBI agent Paul Ballard (Tahmoh Penikett) learns of Echo's original personality, Caroline Farrell, through messages, photographs, and videos he receives anonymously. Agent Ballard becomes obsessed with rumors of the Dollhouse and risks his career trying to prove its existence. It is insinuated that Ballard has developed feelings for Echo prior even to meeting her, which leads him to continue his investigation even after being taken off the case. Meanwhile, Ballard has been casually dating his neighbor, Mellie (Miracle Laurie). While discussing the investigation over takeout, Mellie corrects Ballard when he refers to bringing "her" in, to say "them" in instead. Ballard tries to explain his slip away, but Mellie does not look completely convinced. Mellie's character up to this point on the show is portrayed as a somewhat insecure neighbor with a crush on Ballard. At the end of this episode it is revealed that Mellie is a "sleeper" doll. She has been planted by the Dollhouse to spy on Ballard. Mellie is unaware of her role in the Dollhouse and believes herself to be a young woman falling in love with an FBI agent. She is in fact a Doll known as November.^{E-6}

Ballard finally chases down a lead allowing him to "meet" Caroline/Echo. During the encounter, Echo is terrified of Ballard because she believes she is the personality she has been programmed with. Echo is whisked away by her handler, leaving Ballard with only Joel Mynor (Patton Oswalt), the man who paid for the encounter, to question. Mynor points out the apparent connection that Ballard feels for Echo and cites it as the reason that Ballard is so driven to investigate the Dollhouse.^{E-6}

As Echo continues to evolve and learns to work beyond the limits of each temporary personality imprint or default "tabula rasa" programming, she runs the risk of being sent to "the Attic", a permanent resting place for "broken" dolls and Dollhouse employees who cause problems. She is an object of fascination for the escaped doll, Alpha (Alan Tudyk), a genius and serial killer who has been driven mad by being implanted with the memories of dozens of people, becoming a gestalt-personality. Alpha, the season 1 "Big Bad", returns at the end of the first season to kidnap Caroline.^{E-11}^{,} ^{E-12}

"Epitaph One", the final episode of season one, which was not aired as part of the show's original run on US television, depicts a post-apocalyptic future where the mind-wiping technology of the Dollhouse has developed to the extent that vast numbers of people can be remotely wiped and have new personalities implanted, which has brought about the end of civilization. Many of the series' main characters' futures are shown.^{E-13} As the second season begins, the show's focus shifts to depict the dangers of abusing the mind-wiping technology. Each character in the L.A. Dollhouse is forced to confront their own moral complicity in an increasingly downward spiral from moral grey areas to the realization that what the Dollhouse is doing is ultimately immoral and extremely dangerous. The Dollhouse's corporate sponsor is a medical research entity known as the Rossum Corporation, whose ultimate goal is revealed to be gaining control over national governments and even innocent people with no association with the Dollhouse. Through these abilities, the leaders of Rossum can rule the world and also be immortal, jumping from body to body at will. Attempting to stop the further spread of the mind-wiping technology, the L.A. Dollhouse vows to take down Rossum and its mysterious founder, whom only Echo's original personality, Caroline, has met.^{E-25} They also learn that there is no person named "Rossum"—the company founder took the name from the play R.U.R., which is short for "Rossum's Universal Robots". This 1921 science fiction play by Karel Čapek is the origin of the word "robot".

The final episode of the series is set in the year 2020, and takes place shortly after the events that took place in "Epitaph One". Despite its best efforts, the L.A. Dollhouse has been unsuccessful in stopping the mind-wiping technology from spreading out of control. Rossum executives use multiple bodies to live in decadence while the peoples of the world are enslaved. A now mentally unstable Topher, architect of much of the technology, devises a way of restoring everyone's original personalities and eliminating Rossum's power, but at great sacrifice to himself and others. The series concludes with the world's personalities restored, while the Earth still lies in ruins, and those with Active architecture sheltering inside the Dollhouse for one year in order to keep the memories they have acquired since their original personalities were restored some years ago, rather than being wiped and defaulting back to their memories from before the Dollhouse got hold of them.^{E-26}

== Production ==
The series stars Eliza Dushku, who worked with Whedon on Buffy the Vampire Slayer and Angel. Elizabeth Craft and Sarah Fain were the showrunners, while Jane Espenson, Tim Minear and Steven S. DeKnight served as consulting producers. In addition to Joss Whedon, the writing staff included Tim Minear, Jed Whedon (Joss' brother), Maurissa Tancharoen (Jed's wife), Andrew Chambliss, Tracy Bellomo, Elizabeth Craft and Sarah Fain. Whedon directed a number of his own episodes, as he has done for many of the shows he created. Tim Minear and Buffy producer David Solomon also directed. Fox used a viral marketing campaign to promote Dollhouse in May 2008.

Dollhouse was produced by 20th Century Fox Television, Whedon's Mutant Enemy Productions, and Dushku's Boston Diva Productions, and was granted an initial thirteen-episode production commitment by Fox, with a reported license fee in the range of $1.5 to 2 million per episode. Fox decided to forego the usual practice of ordering a pilot episode of the series, opting to instead put funds towards the construction of the elaborate set and cultural context of the television series. The set was described as a "life-size Dollhouse". On July 22, 2008, Joss Whedon announced that the first episode shot, "Echo", would be pushed to be the second, saying that this "idea to do a new first episode wasn't the network's. It was mine". Despite several reshoots, "Echo" was later pulled from the run entirely; the staff of the show has since noted, during a panel on the series at the Paley Festival, a television festival held at the Paley Center for Media in New York City, that portions of the episode were used in subsequent episodes throughout the series' first season.

Dollhouse, as well as J. J. Abrams' Fringe, aired during its first season with half the commercials and promo spots of most current network dramas, adding about 6 minutes to the shows' run times, as part of a new Fox initiative called "Remote-Free TV". Fox charged a premium price for this advertising space, but did not completely recoup the money that they spent. Fox later canceled Remote-Free TV.

Originally, Whedon announced he was planning to shoot a separate webisode for every Dollhouse episode produced. The webisodes did not materialize, however. There was originally a five-year plan for the show, with Whedon plotting how its characters would evolve through that point.

=== Casting ===
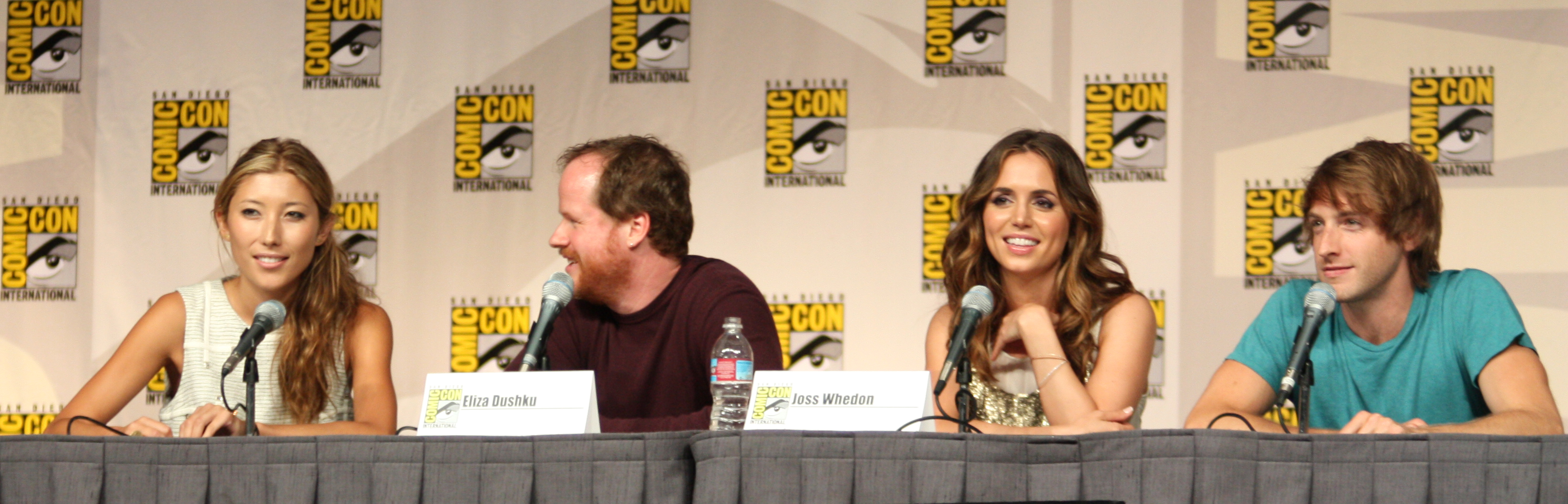
Panel with (left to right) Dichen Lachman, Joss Whedon, Eliza Dushku, and Fran Kranz.

Anya Colloff and Amy McIntyre Britt, who previously worked with Joss Whedon on Buffy the Vampire Slayer, Angel, Firefly, and Serenity, were the show's casting directors.

On March 26, 2008, it was announced that Tahmoh Penikett, Dichen Lachman, Fran Kranz, and Enver Gjokaj had been cast in four principal roles for the show. On April 3, 2008, it was announced that Olivia Williams would be playing the role of Adelle DeWitt. Two weeks later, it was announced that Harry Lennix had also joined the cast. On the same day, Joss Whedon announced on whedonesque.com that Miracle Laurie and Amy Acker were to complete the cast.

Brennan Elliott and Michael Muhney auditioned for the part of Paul Ballard but lost out to Penikett. Ian Anthony Dale and Paul Campbell auditioned for Victor, but Gjokaj got the part.

Whedon said that the early drafts of the show featured Actives with different body shapes and ages but the network decided the Actives should all be young and fit.

=== Unaired "Epitaph One" ===
On April 9, 2009, Whedon rebutted speculation that Fox was set to cancel the show. Producer Tim Minear explained that the "missing" 13th episode (titled "Epitaph One") would be on the DVD release of the season. The reason Minear gave for that episode being dropped from the broadcast run was that the Fox network was counting the original first episode ("Echo"), which went unaired, as part of the original 13-episode order; in contrast, the Fox production company was required by contract to have a minimum of 13 completed episodes for international and DVD releases. According to both Minear and Whedon, the producers felt that the original first episode, having been subsequently scrapped entirely and having had its footage reused for other episodes throughout the season, should not be counted as a completed episode as part of their own 13-episode orders for international and DVD distribution but rather as a DVD extra, and thus Whedon produced a new 13th episode on a lower budget to fulfill the contractual requirements for the international broadcasts. The episode was screened at Comic-Con on July 24, 2009.

"Epitaph One" had its world premiere in Singapore on June 17, 2009, through Season Pass, an on-demand service offered by SingTel mio TV. In the United Kingdom, the episode aired on the UK Sci Fi Channel on August 11, 2009.

=== Second season and cancellation ===
Despite low ratings in its first season, Dollhouse was renewed for a second season of thirteen episodes. Among other factors, fan response to the show was seen as a reason for the renewal; Fox's president of entertainment stated that "if we'd canceled Joss's show I'd probably have 110 million e-mails this morning from the fans". As part of the deal, there was a cut in the show's budget, though Whedon stated that this would not affect the quality of the episodes. The second season also had changes visually; the show moved from being shot on 35 mm film to high-definition video. With the addition of new cinematographer Lisa Wiegand, Whedon wanted the show to look darker. Other visual changes included more hand-held camera work and the addition of snap zooms (an effect that moves in or pulls back very quickly, which was used extensively in Firefly). The series continued in its 9–10 pm Friday timeslot, with the season premiere on September 25, 2009. Season 2 of Dollhouse began filming on July 22, 2009, so Fox pushed back Dollhouse's return to the 25th to afford Whedon and the Dollhouse production team sufficient time to produce enough hours to kick off the season with at least three or four consecutive episodes.

Alexis Denisof joined the cast in a recurring role as Senator Daniel Perrin, as did Summer Glau, who was originally scheduled to appear in just two episodes, a number that was later extended. Michael Hogan and Jamie Bamber, both former castmates of series regular Tahmoh Penikett on Battlestar Galactica, each had roles as guest stars. Michele Fazekas and Tara Butters (creators of Reaper) joined the writing staff for season 2 as replacements for former showrunners Elizabeth Craft and Sarah Fain (who left Dollhouse to join the writing staff of Lie to Me).

Fox announced in October 2009 that it would not be airing any episodes of Dollhouse during November sweeps, and that the series would return in December, airing episodes back-to-back instead. On November 11, 2009, The Hollywood Reporter announced that the show had been cancelled. Fox passed on ordering more episodes of the show; although it did air the entirety of the 13-episode order. After airing the back-to-back episodes in December, the final three episodes aired during January 2010.

== Cast and characters ==
Dollhouse characters. L to R: Paul Ballard, Victor, Echo, Sierra, Topher Brink, Adelle DeWitt, Boyd Langton

The principal characters of Dollhouse are either Actives (or Dolls) or Dollhouse employees. The Actives at the LA Dollhouse are named after letters in the NATO phonetic alphabet; other Dollhouses are shown to use different naming systems.

In the Dollhouse universe, personalities, often constructed by the scientist Topher Brink, are uploaded into Actives, who are kept in a "blank" state prior to upload. This means that different Dolls may be uploaded with the same personality at different times, a situation occasionally exploited for plot purposes. When not in use, each personality (along with its associated memories) is stored in a memory device called a "wedge".

=== Main cast ===
- Eliza Dushku as Echo / Caroline Farrell. Echo is an Active and the protagonist of the series. The most popular Active in the Dollhouse, she shows skills that transcend the parameters of her programming during the course of her engagements. Before her mind was wiped, she was Caroline Farrell,^{E-7} a college graduate and political activist who accidentally uncovers the Rossum Corporation's illegal activities. Her boyfriend is killed during their attempt to infiltrate a Rossum laboratory, and Rossum attempts to have her recruited to the LA Dollhouse.^{E-7} While on the run from Rossum, Caroline becomes a terrorist intent on bringing the corporation down, but she is finally captured.^{E-24} Throughout the series, Echo becomes increasingly self-aware while in her blank state, and at the beginning of season 2 she vows to discover and restore her original self.^{E-14} On achieving full self-awareness, Echo develops a romantic interest in Paul Ballard. Having learned more about her possibly murky past as Caroline, she decides to be her own person.^{E-20} While condemned to the Attic, she discovers Rossum's weakness, and emerges to ally with DeWitt and others at the LA Dollhouse against Rossum.^{E-23} While uncertain what having become her own person will mean for her, she agrees to be reunited with Caroline's personality to gain crucial information about Rossum.^{E-24}
- Harry Lennix as Boyd Langton, a former cop and the Dollhouse handler assigned to Echo. He has doubts about the Dollhouse's ethics, but largely keeps quiet about them. Later in the season 1, he becomes head of security.^{E-9} His morally compromised past is not initially revealed, but he demonstrates considerable skills, and contacts, for example in disposing of dead bodies.^{E-17} When Echo returns to the Dollhouse after a three-month absence, he allies himself with Paul and Topher in keeping Echo's self-awareness secret from the Rossum execs.^{E-21} Echo, after regaining Caroline's memories, discovers that Boyd was one of the two founders of the Rossum Corporation, and seemingly had installed himself in the Dollhouse to become her handler.^{E-24} After attacking Echo, his mind is wiped after Topher finishes a remote wiping device. As a Doll, he is fitted with explosives and given a grenade, and commanded to blow up the Rossum building; he does so, killing himself in the process.^{E-25}
- Fran Kranz as Topher Brink, the scientist who operates Dollhouse's technology and uses it to imprint new personalities on the Actives. Cynical, ego-driven and seemingly amoral, his knowledge of human behavior allows him to specially craft the personality of each Active as required for their various missions. In season 2, he faces several moral dilemmas: the first comes when Rossum requires him to revive a serial killer.^{E-16} When ordered to permanently surrender the Active Sierra to her real-life rapist, Nolan Kinnard, he instead restores Sierra's original personality, Priya, who then kills Kinnard in self-defense. Topher and Boyd help Priya cover up the murder, and Priya agrees to return to the Dollhouse as Sierra.^{E-17} When the LA Dollhouse comes under the control of Matthew Harding, Topher becomes concerned about Rossum's ambitions with the Dollhouse technology. He informs Dewitt that he has figured out Rossum's plan and perfected a technique to imprint any human being remotely, but she betrays him and surrenders it to her superiors.^{E-20} Subsequently, when he learns of Echo's full self-awareness, Topher aligns with Boyd and Paul's "conspiracy".^{E-21} He develops strong romantic feelings for Bennett, whose genius and technological achievements he had admired long before meeting her in person. Bennett appears to reciprocate his feelings, but is killed before a more serious relationship can develop. As the Dollhouse unravels and events spiral out of control, Topher develops an immense guilty conscience, blaming himself (as the technology's inventor) what unfolds. Ultimately, he creates technology to reverse the process that has wiped the minds of the general population, but sacrifices his own life in order to deploy it.
- Tahmoh Penikett as Paul Ballard, an FBI special agent assigned to the Dollhouse case. Most in the Bureau view the case as a joke, but he becomes obsessed with discovering and rescuing Caroline/Echo. The Dollhouse assigns Active November to spy on him by becoming his girlfriend, Mellie. After breaking into the Dollhouse, he agrees to work for them on condition that November be released,^{E-12} and later becomes Echo's handler. He and Echo vow to set the Actives free.^{E-14} When Echo is left out on the streets, Paul finds her and helps conceal her from the Dollhouse for three months, during which time she becomes fully self-aware. Despite her becoming romantically and sexually attracted to him, he abstains from sex with her. The two re-enter the Dollhouse to continue their crusade.^{E-20} They later form an alliance with Boyd and Topher, but Paul is wiped and left braindead by Alpha.^{E-21} Topher partially restores Paul by converting him into an Active, removing one brain function and imprinting him with the scan Alpha took.^{E-23} In doing so, however, he finds it necessary to erase Paul's feelings of love toward Echo.^{E-24} In the final episode, set ten years in the future, Paul is killed in combat, and his memories and personality are imprinted into Echo.^{E-26}
- Enver Gjokaj as Victor / Anthony Ceccoli. Victor is initially introduced as Lubov, Paul Ballard's informant inside the Russian mob, before being revealed to be a Doll.^{E-3} He is also regularly hired out by Adelle DeWitt to be her lover, whom she truly appears to love. Even in his mind-wiped state, Victor is inexplicably attracted to Sierra, despite attempts to wipe his memories and feelings for her.^{E-9} Before entering the Dollhouse, Victor had been Anthony Ceccoli, a War in Afghanistan veteran with posttraumatic stress disorder (of which he is cured by the Dollhouse). He is restored to this personality in "Stop-Loss",^{E-22} and aligns with Priya, Echo, and the LA Dollhouse senior staff against Rossum.^{E-23} In the series finale, ten years in the future, Anthony and Priya share a tense relationship due to his reliance on imprinting technology—which Priya considers a dangerous obsession. Priya eventually realizes he compromised himself only to protect her and their child, and they reconcile.^{E-26}
- Dichen Lachman as Sierra / Priya Tsetsang. Introduced as the newest Active in the Dollhouse, her initial mind wipe occurs in episode 1 of the first season. She is instinctively drawn to Echo, but lacks her growing self-awareness. Prior to her mind being wiped, she had been a painter named Priya Tsetsang.^{E-17} Unlike the other Actives, Sierra was committed to the Dollhouse against her will by a powerful man, Nolan Kinnard, after rejecting his advances. Kinnard hires her out periodically for sexual encounters.^{E-8} During Season 1, she is raped by her handler in her blank state, adding to her trauma.^{E-6} When she is sent permanently to her original rapist and captor, Topher imprints her with her original personality, Priya, and she ends up killing Kinnard. Boyd and Topher dispose of the body and Priya agrees to return to the Dollhouse to be with Anthony/Victor, whom she loves.^{E-17} Priya is later awakened to help retrieve Victor when he is captured and enslaved by Rossum,^{E-22} and the two unite with Echo and the senior staff of the LA Dollhouse against Rossum.^{E-23} Ten years after the events of the series, Priya is shown to have a child with Anthony. She raises the child alone, mistrusting Anthony's obsession with imprinting technology. Near the series end, Priya recognizes his unwavering devotion to her, and reunites the family.^{E-26}
- Olivia Williams as Adelle DeWitt, the highest-ranking official at the Los Angeles Dollhouse. She claims to believe that the Dollhouse's aims are truly benevolent; however, during Season 2 her attitude becomes increasingly cynical, and she eventually joins the conspiracy against Rossum.^{E-23} Despite being the head of the LA Dollhouse (which is just one of more than twenty worldwide)^{E-6} DeWitt answers to a number of superiors at the Rossum Corporation. It is revealed that she has been hiring out Victor as her lover, while concealing this activity from others in the Dollhouse by inventing a client named "Miss Lonelyhearts".^{E-9}

=== Recurring cast ===
- Amy Acker as Whiskey / Claire Saunders. Initially introduced as the Actives' general physician, Dr. Claire Saunders, she is revealed in the season 1 finale to be an Active. Formerly the Dollhouse's most popular Doll, Whiskey was attacked by Alpha with a pair of scissors, leaving her face extensively scarred. Shortly afterward (and before the events of episode 1), Alpha killed the actual Dr. Saunders, and Whiskey was imprinted with a modified version of his personality and skill-set to serve as his replacement. Saunders has trouble adjusting to the realization that she is merely Topher's creation, and objects to being wiped or restored as that would be equivalent to dying. She takes leave of the Dollhouse for some time to find herself.^{E-14} Later, she begins a relationship with Boyd, who brings her back to the Dollhouse for the confrontation with the Rossum corporation. She shoots Bennett in front of Topher.^{E-24} [Acker has since confirmed that her character was in fact acting as a sleeper Active, not merely out of jealousy.] In "The Hollow Men",^{E-25} Whiskey is imprinted as Rossum co-founder Clyde 2.0 and does battle with Echo. From then until the time of the flashforward episode "Epitaph One",^{E-13} Whiskey is re-imprinted with Dr. Saunders' personality and programmer skills. Later, after her scars have healed, she is again Whiskey, acting as a guardian for the Dollhouse and pointing people towards Safe Haven. When the Dollhouse is breached in "Epitaph One",^{E-13} she releases a toxic gas, incapacitating the intruders and leaving her own fate uncertain.
- Reed Diamond as Laurence Dominic. As head of security at the Dollhouse, he takes his job very seriously but views the Dolls as more like pets than humans. He attempts to kill Echo, and openly suggests she be retired as an Active and put into the Attic.^{E-5} Later, under the influence of a drug, he attempts to apologize to Echo.^{E-7} He is revealed to be an NSA agent monitoring—but not exposing—the Dollhouse, for unknown purposes. He may or may not have been Senator Perrin's NSA contact who Perrin says has "gone dark." Upon discovering he is a spy, DeWitt orders Topher to extract his persona and then sends him to the Attic.^{E-9} While there, he becomes a defender of other imprisoned minds against the shadowy killer Arcane. He and Echo work together after she arrives in the Attic.^{E-23}
- Miracle Laurie as November / Mellie / Madeline Costley. Introduced as Mellie—Paul's neighbor, romantic interest, and confidante—she is soon revealed to be a sleeper Active.^{E-6} DeWitt is shown to switch her to a combat-ready personality and back using verbal codes.^{E-6} In "Omega",^{E-12} her original persona and memories are restored and she is released from her contract early with full payment, at Paul's request in exchange for his joining the Dollhouse's staff. She returns to her life as Madeline Costley.^{E-12} She is approached by Senator Daniel Perrin with evidence of the criminal and sexual acts she was made to perform as an Active, and agrees to testify before Congress about the Dollhouse.^{E-18} This turns out to be a trap; Perrin (himself an Active) denounces her as a liar and produces faked evidence "disproving" the existence of the Dollhouse. She is sent to the less scrupulous Washington D.C. Dollhouse where her mind is forcibly erased and she is re-enslaved.^{E-19} After Paul rescues her, Dewitt chooses to reawaken her as Mellie rather than Madeline during the Dollhouse's confrontation with Rossum, due to Mellie's devotion to Paul and Madeline's disloyalty.^{E-24} When her sleeper self is later activated to kill Paul during an invasion of the Rossum headquarters, she commits suicide rather than harm him.^{E-25}
- Liza Lapira as Ivy, Topher's assistant. Although she is highly skilled and sees herself as Topher's apprentice, Topher treats her more as a gofer, assigning her menial tasks such as fetching snacks. She later teams up with DeWitt, Boyd, Priya, Anthony, Echo, Paul, and Topher to take down Rossum. Not wanting her to get hurt in the battle, Topher tells her to leave and not become like him. She then escapes from the Dollhouse.^{E-24}
- Kevin Kilner as Joe Hearn (season 1), Sierra's handler for the first six episodes, and the handler of the previous Sierra. He is introduced as a less-dedicated counterpart to Boyd Langton.^{E-3} He strongly dislikes Echo for her individualism and worries about her influence on Sierra. DeWitt eventually learns that Hearn has raped Sierra in her blank state four times, and has him killed by activating November's combat-ready personality while he's on assignment to assassinate "Mellie".^{E-6}
- Vincent Ventresca as Dr. Nolan Kinnard, a wealthy psychiatrist, Rossum Corp VIP, and art collector. He meets Sierra while she is still aspiring artist Priya Tsetsang. As a means of high-profile courtship he buys one of her paintings and invites her to a party where it is exhibited. She spurns his advances, and in retaliation he drugs her with psychotropic medications to mimic the symptoms of schizophrenia, then turns her over to the Dollhouse.^{E-17} When Priya, her original personality temporarily restored, confronts him, he gloats that he can have her any time he wants, even making her beg.^{E-8} He eventually requests that Sierra be sent to him permanently, a demand that Rossum forces DeWitt to obey. A remorseful Topher imprints Sierra with her original personality, and during her confrontation with Kinnard he produces a knife, leading to her stabbing him. Topher and Boyd dispose of the body.^{E-17}
- Alan Tudyk as Alpha,^{E-11} born Carl William Craft,^{E-12} a rogue Active who escapes from the Dollhouse. Prior to the events of the series, an accident causes a "composite event" in which 48 personalities are simultaneously imprinted in Alpha, along with all the associated memories and skill sets, creating a Gestalt personality. In his escape, he kills or maims several Dolls and Dollhouse staff members (including Echo's then handler) but leaves Echo unscathed.^{E-2} After his escape, Alpha begins sending anonymous packages to Paul Ballard, hinting at the existence of the Dollhouse and Echo's former identity.^{E-1} Alpha reveals himself after posing as Stephen Kepler, an Environmental Systems Consultant involved in the construction of the LA Dollhouse facility, whom Paul has tracked down. He leads Paul into the Dollhouse, takes control of the security and automated systems, and leaves with Echo.^{E-11} Although Echo escapes from him, he remains at large.^{E-12} On learning of Echo's full self-actualisation and romantic attraction to Paul, he imprints Paul's personality into himself and leaves Paul's body brain-dead.^{E-21} In the series finale, Alpha is shown to have defected to Echo's side. When the wiping technology is to be reversed, Alpha isolates himself from the group to prevent his pre-wipe serial-killer personality leading the others to danger.^{E-26}
- Alexis Denisof as Daniel Perrin (season 2^{E-14}), a third-generation US Senator who was kidnapped by the Rossum Corporation to be turned into an Active. Subsequent fake memory implants significantly alter his personality and memories of his wife (actually his handler), turning him from a drunken slacker known for partying into a serious-minded politician and reformer. Though his conditioning is undone and he escapes with Echo, it is ultimately restored and, on Rossum's orders, he "debunks" the Dollhouse myth.^{E-19}
- Keith Carradine as Matthew Harding, the Rossum Corp executive who oversees DeWitt. He does not delude himself about Rossum's goals or the Dollhouse's purpose, and sees the Actives as company property. He insists DeWitt surrender Sierra to Kinnard,^{E-17} and keep her nose out of the Senator Perrin engagement.^{E-18} For three months, he becomes the head of the LA Dollhouse while it develops the remote wipe technology for Rossum. DeWitt wrests power back off of him by showing her subservience to Rossum and by handing over the complete remote imprint schematics designed by Topher.^{E-20}
- Summer Glau as Bennett Halverson (season 2; introduced in "The Public Eye"^{E-18}), the D.C. Dollhouse's programmer. Even Topher regards her as a genius. Caroline (prior to the events of the series and before becoming Echo) had been her best friend. Although it initially appears that Caroline betrayed Bennett and left her for dead, it is later revealed that she was attempting to disavow Bennett's involvement in the bombing attack the two mounted against Rossum—but Bennett does not forgive her. When Bennett attempts to kill Echo by imprinting Daniel Perrin with an assassin persona, she is thwarted by Topher, despite his being attracted to her.^{E-19} Eventually, she is kidnapped by Paul and Anthony, who take her back to the Dollhouse in order to fix Caroline's wedge, but she is shot in the head by Whiskey/Saunders directly after sharing her first kiss with Topher.^{E-24} She is last seen onscreen in a tape Topher plays in which she lectures about neuroscience, helping him develop the device to reverse the wiping of the human race.

=== Minor roles ===
Maurissa Tancharoen, Teddy Sears and Emma Bell as Actives Kilo, Mike and Tango. Angel Desai (Sophie Alvarez) and Kevin Kilner (Joe Hearn) as Dollhouse staff. Mark Sheppard and Aisha Hinds play FBI agent Graham Tanaka and FBI analyst Loomis respectively. Felicia Day (Mag), Zack Ward (Zone) and Adair Tishler (Iris) are members of a group who calls themselves the "actuals", people who have not been imprinted and retain their original personalities.

== Home media ==
Dollhouse: Season One
Set details: 14 episodes (including 2 unaired episodes); 4-disc set (3-disc Blu-ray Disc set); Features: Anamorphic widescreen (1.78:1 aspect ratio); Dolby Digital 5.1 English audio (DVD); 5.1 DTS-HD Master Audio (Blu-ray Disc); Subtitles vary depending on region		Bonus features: Three audio commentaries; "Ghost" by Joss Whedon and Eliza Dushku; "Man on the Street" by Joss Whedon; "Epitaph One" by Maurissa Tancharoen and Jed Whedon; Two unaired episodes; "Echo" – the original pilot; "Epitaph One" – the 13th episode; Featurettes; "Making Dollhouse"; "Coming Back Home"; "Finding Echo"; "Designing the Perfect Dollhouse"; "A Private Engagement"; Deleted Scenes	
Release dates:	Region 1	Region 2	Region 4
Release dates:	July 28, 2009	September 7, 2009 (DVD); October 11, 2010 (Blu-ray Disc)	November 5, 2009 (South America); October 24, 2012 (Australia/New Zealand)

Dollhouse: Season Two
Set details: 13 episodes; 4-disc set (3-disc Blu-ray Disc set); Features: Anamorphic widescreen (1.78:1 aspect ratio); Dolby Digital 5.1 English audio (DVD); 5.1 DTS-HD Master Audio (Blu-ray Disc); Subtitles vary depending on region		Bonus features: Three audio commentaries; "Vows" by Joss Whedon; "Belonging" by Maurissa Tancharoen and Jed Whedon; "Getting Closer" by Tim Minear (Blu-ray Disc exclusive); Featurettes; "Defining Moments"; "Looking Back"; Deleted Scenes; Outtakes	
Release dates:	Region 1	Region 2	Region 4
Release dates:	October 12, 2010	October 11, 2010	April 10, 2013 (Australia/New Zealand)

- The Dollhouse Season One DVD sold over 62,000 copies in the first week, and made over $1.8 million.

== Comic books ==
Cover of Dollhouse Epitaphs

During the 2010 San Diego Comic-Con, it was announced that a comic book had been written by Jed Whedon and Maurissa Tancharoen. The book, titled Dollhouse Epitaphs, features a new storyline to bridge the gap between the main series and "Epitaph One" and "Epitaph Two: Return". It was drawn by Cliff Richards and published by Dark Horse Comics.

The book was a 24-page one-off limited edition, only available in the season two DVD or Blu-ray Disc. Early copies were released at the 2010 San Diego Comic-Con for those who pre-ordered either the DVD or Blu-ray Disc at the event. Both Jed Whedon and Maurissa Tancharoen were available to sign the copies.

It was later revealed at New York Comic-Con 2010 that there will be more comics that take place in the Dollhouse universe. A one-shot was released on March 30, 2011, and a miniseries began with the first issue released on July 13, 2011. The one-shot, which reprints the Season 2 exclusive with additional material, is written by Jed Whedon and Maurissa Tancharoen and the miniseries is written by Andrew Chambliss. The comics are set in a future Los Angeles after the Dollhouse technology has reduced the city to ruins. The miniseries was later published in a trade paperback collection released on April 11, 2012.

== Marketing ==
Promotional posters featuring Eliza Dushku as Echo surrounded by blank mannequins were used to advertise Dollhouse by Fox prior to the series' premiere.

On February 12, 2009, Fox launched Dollplay, a participation drama centered around Dollhouse. It involved using interactive webisodes and a user forum to drive a viral marketing campaign. The campaign asked users on the Fox Dollhouse website to "Save Hazel!" Hazel was a character trapped inside the Dollhouse in real-time. The campaign was called "Dollplay" according to the official Fox press release and was created by the company P, "a radical production outfit from Sweden".

Another viral marketing campaign was launched in November 2009 when the series was on hiatus. The campaign gave background on the Rossum Corporation, the technology company behind the Dollhouse, and offered clues as to how the apocalyptic future begins.

== Reception ==
=== Ratings ===
The premiere episode of Dollhouse helped Fox double its audience levels among women versus Terminator: The Sarah Connor Chronicles, and helped the network finish in second place among adults 18–34 and in first place in the key male demographic for the night.

Season	Episodes	Timeslot	Season premiere	Season finale	TV season	Rank	Viewers (in millions)
1	13 (2 unaired, including the unaired pilot)	Friday 9:00 pm	February 13, 2009	May 8, 2009	2009	#132	4.63
2	13	Friday 8:00 p.m. (December 4–18, 2009; January 29, 2010); Friday 9:00 p.m. (September 25 – October 23, 2009; January 8–15, 2010)	September 25, 2009	January 29, 2010	2009–10	#131	2.17

=== Critical response ===
Season one of Dollhouse had mixed reviews, with Metacritic giving it a rating of 57 out of 100 based on 28 reviews. On Rotten Tomatoes, the first season has an approval rating of 63% based on 52 reviews with an average score of 6.4/10. The website's critical consensus reads, "Joss Whedon's provocative procedural poses troubling questions about autonomy and consciousness, but repeatedly hitting the reset button on Eliza Dushku's character makes Dollhouse feel dispiritingly empty."

Ellen Gray of the Philadelphia Daily News gave a positive review, remarking that "Dollhouse is less about the ninja kicks and witty banter than it is about instant transformations, and about making the audience care about a character who's likely to behave differently every time we see her. That Dushku mostly pulls this off is a happy surprise, as is Dollhouse, which has survived Firefly-like trials of its own to get this far." Salon reviewer Heather Havrilesky was also positive, commenting that the show's combination of mystery, sly dialogue, and steady flow of action results in a "provocative, bubbly new drama that looks as promising as anything to hit the small screen over the course of the past year."

Alternately, Tom Shales of The Washington Post wrote that the premise was "admittedly intriguing", but described the series as a "pretentious and risible jumble" and that Echo did not "inspire much concern or interest in the audience". He commented that the actors seemed to struggle due to the decor being so "outlandish", stating that it "simply isn't worth the trouble". Brian Lowry of Variety also wrote "Dushku's grasp of this vague, personality-changing character is a bit of a muddle. What's left, then, is a series with a hollow center that doesn't initially make you care about its mentally malleable protagonist." Robert Bianco of USA Today had a more nonchalant view of the series, describing Dollhouse as not boring or ordinary, and that the result is a show "that Joss Whedon's most devoted fans will debate and embrace, and a mass audience just won't get".

Many critics felt that the series' first season improved as it progressed. IGN reviewer Eric Goldman believed the show became much stronger and more compelling with the episodes "Needs" and "A Spy in the House of Love". He opined of the later episodes that, "As a whole this show is definitely working better as we get away from Echo's missions of the week, and from focusing so much on just Echo and letting there be more of a true ensemble feel, with the time split amongst the Dolls." Sarah Hughes of The Independent was unimpressed with the first five episodes but also found that the later episodes became "as involving and addictive as Whedon's best work". Maureen Ryan of the Chicago Tribune liked Dollhouse's "unsettling" tone and found the show to be "unexpectedly moving and complex" during the second half of the first season. She called the second season renewal "a good day for unconventional television".

The second season received a more positive reception. On Rotten Tomatoes, the second season has an approval rating of 81% based on 21 reviews with an average score of 7.6/10. The website's critical consensus reads, "Dollhouse feels more confident as a perverse mind-teaser in its second season after injecting its automatons with more humanity and broadening its mythology."
