= David Solomon (TV producer) =

American television director and producer

- Occupation(s): Television director, television producer
- Years active: 1979–present

David Solomon is an American television director and producer. He is well known for directing Buffy the Vampire Slayer between 1997 and 2003. He also directed one episode of Firefly in 2002, over a season of Las Vegas in 2004 and 2005, one episode of Private Practice in 2007 and the first episode of the 2008 Knight Rider series.

Some of Solomon's other television credits include Dollhouse, The Gates, Nikita, Tru Calling, Chuck, Burn Notice, Once Upon a Time, Fringe and Agents of S.H.I.E.L.D.

He also worked as an editor and producer on a number of Perry Mason television films. In 2002, he won the Online Film & Television Association Award for Best Direction in a Drama Series for Buffy the Vampire Slayer. In 2010, the film Dollhouse earned him a nomination for the Hugo Award for Best Dramatic Presentation.
