= Echo (Dollhouse character) =

Fictional character

Echo/Caroline Farrell
- Dollhouse character
- First appearance: "Ghost"
- Last appearance: "Epitaph Two: Return"
- Created by: Joss Whedon
- Portrayed by: Eliza Dushku

In-universe information
- Aliases: Many, Caroline Farrell (name before she was wiped)
- Gender: Female
- Occupation: Doll (Active)

Echo is a fictional character portrayed by Eliza Dushku in the Fox science fiction series Dollhouse, created by Joss Whedon. Within the series' narrative, Echo is an "Active" or a "doll", one of a group of men and women who can be programmed with memories and skills to engage in particular assignments; in their default state, Actives are innocent, childlike and suggestible. Before having her memories wiped, Echo's name was Caroline Farrell. The central character of Dollhouse, the series focuses on Echo as she begins to develop self-awareness. By the series' conclusion, Echo develops a fully formed self, personality, and the aggregate skills and abilities of all her many personalities, which she uses in her struggle against the evil Rossum Corporation which owns the Dollhouses and plots world domination.

== Character ==
=== Before the Dollhouse ===
Caroline Farrell was a student at a Los Angeles university which hosted a research lab for the Rossum Corporation.

=== In the Dollhouse ===
Farrell signs on with Dollhouse, an organization that "wipes" the minds of its employees and reprograms them to fit the requests of their clients. The reprogrammed employees are known as "Actives". Farrell's Active self is given the name "Echo". As the series progresses, Echo begins to become progressively more inquisitive and self-aware of her status as an Active.

== Conception ==
"As actors, we're expected to play characters, and in a way it feels like people are trying to download the latest trend into a Hollywood actress and make them like everyone else."

— Eliza Dushku reflects on the parallel between the Dollhouse and Hollywood.

Dollhouse was created during a lunch between Joss Whedon and Eliza Dushku where they discussed her career and her recent development deal with Fox. Inspired by Dushku's life as an actress, Whedon came up with the premise of people who were hired out to be everybody's fantasy. Whedon and Dushku had long been friends since working together on Buffy the Vampire Slayer, in which Dushku portrayed Faith, and he would occasionally intervene in her life to offer career advice. At one time, the two had considered producing a Faith spin-off project together. Whedon commented that he got "frustrated with all these crappy horror movies she was making. Like Wrong Turn and Soul Survivors and whatnot" which he says "broke my heart." Over lunch, Whedon told Dushku that he feels she possesses "something that no other actor I've worked with has" and from there, the concept of Dollhouse and Echo began to develop. Whedon propositioned Dushku, "I know the perfect show to write for you. ... I've known you for 10 years, and I have no idea who [or] what you are, so ... let's just video it." Echo's story was very much inspired by Dushku's own career; Dushku had in Whedon's words, spent her whole life "trying to take control of her career" and feeling, in Dushku's words "like everyone wants you to be a different person". Consequently, Dushku believes there is something of herself in Echo, in Caroline, and in every engagement identity Echo assumes. Whedon has described Echo as being "absolutely the essence of strength boiled down" and commenting "She's at her strongest when she's at her least powerful. She has an extraordinary tenacity." Dushku has described the character as "fierce" "hot", but also "so complex" and "tripped out" due to being "in a world where there are people who can click a button and succeed in making you be what they want you to be".

== See also ==
- List of Dollhouse characters
