= Maurissa Tancharoen =

American writer, producer and actress

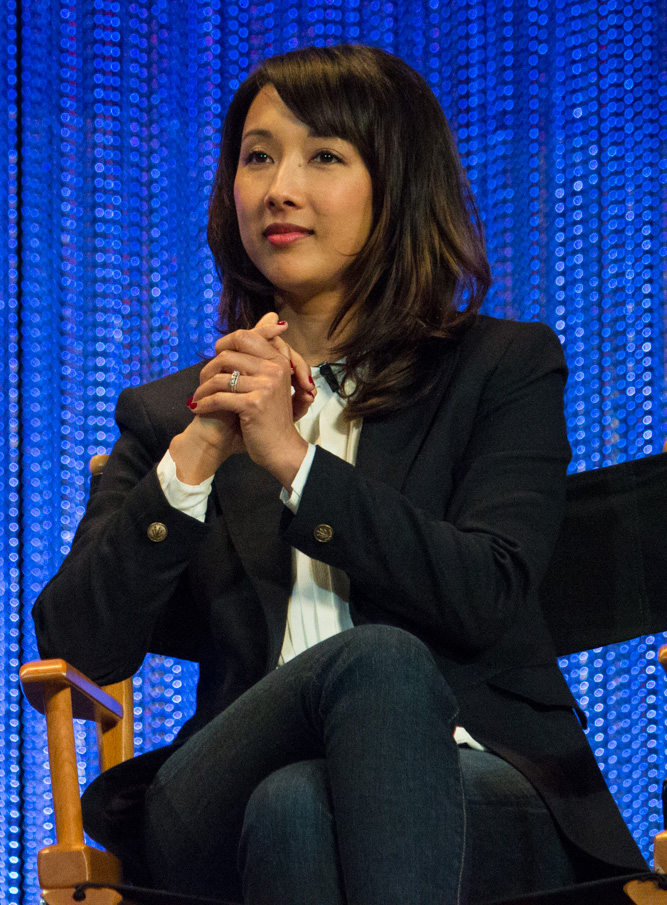
- Tancharoen in 2014
- Born: Los Angeles, California, U.S.
- Other name: Maurissa Tancharoen Whedon
- Occupations: Writer; producer; actress
- Years active: 1988–present
- Spouse: Jed Whedon (m. 2009)
- Relatives: Kevin Tancharoen (brother); Tom Whedon (father-in-law)

Maurissa Tancharoen (/məˈrɪsə ˌtæntʃəˈroʊn/) is an American writer, producer, and actress. She is known for her work as the co-creator, show runner, and executive producer of Marvel's Agents of S.H.I.E.L.D., which aired on the ABC television network for 7 seasons from 2013 to 2020. She is from Los Angeles.

== Career ==
Tancharoen has worked as an actress, writer, production assistant, showrunner, and executive producer in television and film.

She began working as a production assistant under producer Mark Tinker on NYPD Blue and William M. Finkelstein on Brooklyn South. Along with brother Kevin Tancharoen, she co-executive produced of the series DanceLife in collaboration with Jennifer Lopez in 2007. She co-produced episodes of the Starz series Spartacus: Gods of the Arena and Spartacus: Vengeance.

Tancharoen sold her first script in 2001 when Revolution Studios bought an untitled pitch about two Asian American FBI agents investigating a gang in South Central Los Angeles while working undercover as store clerks at a Korean store. She was hired as a writer on the short-lived sitcom Oliver Beene in 2003.

During the 2007-2008 Writers Guild of America strike, Tancharoen worked with her writing partner Jed Whedon and his brothers, Zack and writer/director Joss on the musical comedy-drama miniseries Dr. Horrible's Sing-Along Blog, which was produced exclusively for internet distribution and circumvented issues which were being protested during the strike. The musical was highly successful and won seven awards at the 2009 Streamy Awards for web television.

Tancharoen went on to work as a writer and story editor on Drop Dead Diva and Dollhouse. She worked uncredited on The Avengers, with brother-in-law director Joss and husband Jed Whedon. The success of The Avengers opened the door for a successful pitch by the trio to create the Marvel universe TV series Agents of S.H.I.E.L.D. Tancharoen was the co-writer, showrunner, and co-executive producer with Jed for Agents of S.H.I.E.L.D. for seven seasons (2013–2020).

In addition to her writing and production credits, Tancharoen has appeared on screen or contributed voice talent in episodes of Dollhouse, Dr. Horrible's Sing-Along Blog, and Joss Whedon's 2011 adaptation of Shakespeare's Much Ado About Nothing. She co-wrote and performed lyrics for "Remains" with Jed Whedon for the Dollhouse episode "Epitaph One". She was Zelda's singing voice in the season 2 episode "The Musical" of The Legend of Neil, a spoof based on the video game The Legend of Zelda. According to her Twitter posts, she performed backing vocals and danced in the video for The Guild parody song "(Do You Wanna Date My) Avatar" released on August 17, 2009. In the Dr. Horrible's Sing-Along Blog DVD, "Commentary! The Musical", she sings about the scarcity of non-stereotyped roles in television and film for actors of Asian origin.

== Personal life and education ==
Tancharoen (ตันเจริญ) was born to a Thai family. Her father Tommy Tancharoen is a transportation coordinator in Hollywood. Her younger brother Kevin Tancharoen is a director, whose feature film debut was 2009's Fame. On April 19, 2009, she married fellow writer Jed Whedon, brother of Joss Whedon.

Tancharoen was a singer and dancer as a child and teenager. She appeared as a dancer in the "Badder" segment of Michael Jackson's Moonwalker in 1988. She was also a member of the all-girl multi-cultural R&B group Pretty in Pink which recorded a single album with Motown in 1991. Chaka Khan's daughter, Milini Khan was a member of the group; the other members of the group were Shey Sperry, Tameika Chaney, and Taniya Robinson. The band broke up without having recorded a hit song.

Tancharoen attended Occidental College, where she majored in English and comparative literary studies and minored in theater. She began writing during her time at Occidental and authored two plays which earned the school's Argonaut & Moore literary award.

=== Lupus ===
Tancharoen was diagnosed with lupus at the age of 15. Her early symptoms of fatigue, joint pain, and a butterfly rash intensified as she aged resulting in periodic episodes in which the autoimmune disease attacks her organs and central nervous system. She has been an advocate for lupus awareness and research, talking about her personal experience with the disease during media interviews.

Tancharoen said, "Every year during May I do my part to raise lupus awareness, from conversations with friends and family to always wearing my purple during Lupus Awareness Month and definitely on Put On Purple Day."

Her friends and family formed Club Mo to raise money for the Walk for Lupus Now event in Los Angeles in 2011. The team raised about $80,000 for the event.

== Awards ==
In 2009, Tancharoen won a Streamy Award for Best Writing for a Comedy Web Series for Dr. Horrible's Sing-Along Blog.

== Studio album ==
- Wake Up (with Pretty In Pink) (Motown, 1991)

== Acting credits ==
=== Film ===
Year	Title	Role	Notes
1988	Moonwalker	Dancer	Segment: "Badder"
2003	Headache	EKG Nurse	Short
2005	I?	Jessica	Short
2008	Promotion		Short
2012	Much Ado About Nothing	Additional Cast	
2014	Lust for Love	Hazel	

=== Television ===
Year	Title	Role	Notes
2005	King of the Hill	Yuppie Woman #1 (voice)	Episode: "Mutual of Omabwah"
2008	Dr. Horrible's Sing-Along Blog	Groupie #1	Episode: "Act III"
2009	The Legend of Neil	Zelda (singing voice)	Episode: "Les Neilérables"
2009	Floored and Lifted	Mo	Episode: "That's Fine"
2009–2010	Dollhouse	Kilo	Episodes: "The Public Eye", "Meet Jane Doe", "Epitaph Two: The Return"
2011	The Guild	Alina	Episodes: "Ends and Begins", "Revolving Doors", "Downturn"
2011, 2013	Mortal Kombat: Legacy	Kana	Episodes: "Scorpion & Sub Zero: Parts 1 & 2", "Liu Kang and Kung Lao Reunite in Macau"
2013	LearningTown	Young Wand-A	Episodes: "Princess", "Viral", "Storm"
2019	Agents of S.H.I.E.L.D.	Sequoia	Episode: "Code Yellow"

== Production credits ==
Year	Title	Notes
1998–2000	NYPD Blue	Assistant to Mark Tinker (31 episodes)
2003	Oliver Beene	Staff writer (TV series)
2007	DanceLife	Co-executive producer (TV series)
2008	Dr. Horrible's Sing-Along Blog	Writer ("Act I-III")
2009	Drop Dead Diva	Story editor (8 episodes), writer ("Crazy")
2009–2010	Dollhouse	Story editor, writer (13 episodes)
2011	Spartacus: Gods of the Arena	Co-producer (6 episodes), writer ("Missio")
2012	Spartacus: Vengeance	Co-producer (5 episodes)
2013–2020	Agents of S.H.I.E.L.D.	Creator, executive producer, writer (17 episodes), showrunner (44 episodes)
2016	Agents of S.H.I.E.L.D.: Slingshot	Executive producer (6 episodes)
