= Studio Disney (disambiguation) =

Studio Disney may refer to the following:

- Studio Disney - Disney programme in Australia.
- Studio Disney UK - Past Disney programme which aired in the United Kingdom until 2005.
