= Singapore American School =

Coordinates: 1°25′32.86″N 103°46′31.81″E

Location
- 40 Woodlands Street 41; Singapore 738547; Singapore

Information
- Type: Private International School
- Established: 3 January 1956; 70 years ago
- Superintendent: Tom Boasberg
- CEEB code: 687225
- Faculty: 395
- Enrolment: 4,022 (fall 2019)
- Campus size: 36 acres (15 ha)
- Campus type: Suburban
- Colours: Red, white, and blue
- Mascot: Eagles
- Website: https://www.sas.edu.sg/

Singapore American School (SAS) is a non-profit, independent, co-educational day school located in the Marsiling area of Singapore. It offers an American-based curriculum for students in preschool through high school. One of Singapore's first international schools, SAS was founded in 1956 and started with a hundred students in a colonial house. It has since developed into a school of over 4,000 students on a 1.5-acre (0.61 ha) campus. SAS is accredited by the US-based Western Association of Schools and Colleges (WASC).

The SAS student body is made up of over 65 nationalities, with over half of the students being United States citizens. Singaporean student numbers are limited as Singapore government regulations prevent most local students from attending international schools within the country. The majority of the teachers come from the US, and staff members from twenty other countries also work at SAS. Most are hired overseas, and over 80% hold master's degrees. The maximum number of students per class in preschool and pre-kindergarten is 16, while for kindergarten through grade 12 it is 22.

SAS offers classes in the standard academic subjects as well as foreign languages, music, art, physical education, dance, sports, and technology. The high school offers around 20 AP courses, including the AP Capstone programme. The school also has an extensive Advanced Topics (AT) program, offering around 30 such courses. The campus has both air-conditioned and open-air spaces. Facilities include gyms, cafeterias, libraries, and theatres, as well as courtyards, playgrounds, playing fields, swimming pools, tennis courts, a rainforest, and an eco-garden.

== History ==
Singapore American School was established by the American Association of Malaya in January 1956. It was originally intended as a school for the children of American executives, missionaries, and diplomats who did not want to follow the British practice of sending school-aged children home to boarding schools. In the beginning, around a hundred elementary and junior-high students attended classes in a colonial house on Rochalie Drive, on the edge of downtown Singapore. High school classes were soon added, and the school grew quickly, attracting students from a wide variety of backgrounds.

Over the next half-century, the school moved several times:

- In 1962, the school moved to a purpose-built K-12 facility on King's Road, as it had outgrown the Rochalie Drive campus.
- By 1971, the school's population had outgrown the King's Road campus, and SAS's younger students were moved to two temporary sites, Alexandra Junior School and Gillman Barracks.
- In 1973, a new K-8 campus opened on Ulu Pandan Road, and the King's Road campus was turned into an expanded high school.
- To accommodate a long wait-list, the satellite Baytree elementary campus in Clementi was established in 1990–91.
- In 1996, the Woodlands Campus was opened, and all SAS students were once again together on one campus.

=== Woodlands campus history ===
By the late 1980s, SAS again faced space constraints, as enrolment continued to outstrip capacity at both the King's Road and Ulu Pandan campuses. In addition, the Ulu Pandan lease would soon expire, and the Singapore government wanted the school to accommodate more students, as part of its push to attract foreign talent to help develop new industries. While SAS opened the temporary Baytree campus as a short-term solution, the government offered three sites for a brand-new campus, and the school selected a large plot in the developing Woodlands neighbourhood. The school received a 90-year lease, with the stipulation that the new campus be able to accommodate 3,700 students. The site was developed at the cost of $150 million, and the Woodlands campus opened in the fall of 1996. To the surprise of many in the American community, enrolment quickly rose to capacity, and the western end of the campus had to be redeveloped into a new high school and early learning centre, which opened in 2004.

== School governance and finance ==
SAS is a non-profit, member-based independent school. It is incorporated in the Republic of Singapore and recognised under the Singapore Charities Act. Parents, guardians, teachers and administrators are members of the school unless they opt out. All members are invited to the annual general meeting (AGM) in October, at which the superintendent reviews the school's progress and finances. Members participate in school governance by electing the board of governors. These twelve parents of enrolled students serve in a volunteer capacity for terms of three years. The board is responsible for hiring the superintendent and providing strategic oversight for the school, while the superintendent and administrative team are responsible for the school's day-to-day operations.

The school's finances are managed by the chief operating officer under the guidance of the superintendent and board. An independent financial audit is conducted annually and presented at the AGM. The school maintains financial reserves and an endowment to ensure long-term financial stability. An investment advisory committee supports the board in managing these funds. Two philanthropic organisations support educational programs, operations, and capital initiatives at SAS. These are the SAS Foundation Limited (Singapore), and the Singapore American School Foundation (United States). The SAS Annual Fund solicits donations to these foundations from current and former parents and employees, as well as from SAS alumni and friends of the school. Foundations funds make possible special opportunities for students, as well as providing for the long-term financial health of the school.

== School organisation and divisions ==
SAS is organised into three divisions: The elementary school (including the early learning centre) for preschool through grade 5; the middle school for grades 6–8; and the high school for grades 9–12. A principal and deputy principals guide each division.

=== Elementary School: Early Learning Center ===
The SAS ELC (Early Learning Center) serves three- and four-year-old students in a self-contained set of learning hubs, activity spaces, and playgrounds adjacent to the high school. Students in preschool and pre-K have a shorter school day than those in the rest of the school. The ELC program is inspired by the Reggio Emilia schools in Italy. Two classes of 16 students each are combined to form a hub, and each hub is guided by two teachers and two teaching aides.

Besides spending time in their individual classrooms, students have two recesses every day, which take place on the two ELC playgrounds and in the large central hall. They also have a separate Chinese class and a perceptual motor class in the Move and Groove Room. Once a week students have library time in the ELC's own library corner. Students also have "buddy time" with older students, counselling lessons to develop social skills, and special celebrations.

=== Elementary School: grades K–5 ===
Students in the elementary school are organised into classes with a maximum of 24 students. Teachers are supported by instructional aides. Students receive instruction in reading, writing, math, social studies, and science in their classrooms. The elementary school's literacy program is based on the Columbia Teachers’ College program, and students use the enVision math common core program. Outside their home classrooms, students attend their choice of daily Spanish or Chinese language classes. A Chinese-immersion program started in Kindergarten in August 2017. Art, music, and PE classes occur in a three-day rotational schedule, with library, science laboratory, technology, and counselling lessons at longer intervals.

A 1:1 iPad program ensures that each K–5 student uses technology to support learning, and students have service learning opportunities based on grade-level themes. Special events include United Nations Day, PTA Book Fair, PTA-sponsored holiday parties, Chinese New Year celebrations, and an end-of-year Play Day. In each grade students go on several field trips. Destinations include the Singapore Zoo, Little India, the Asian Civilisations Museum, Sungei Buloh Wetlands Reserve, and various plays and theatre offerings. Parents are welcome to help in classrooms, as field trip chaperones, and with parties and special events throughout the year.

The elementary school occupies the eastern end of the SAS campus, and includes its own language, art, music, and science classrooms, as well as a library, an auditorium/theatre, two pools, two gyms (one with a climbing wall), two cafeterias, and several playgrounds.

=== Middle School: grades 6–8 ===
The SAS middle school offers a foundation of academic classes complemented by elective courses and after-school activities. “Homebase” meets every morning, giving each group of a dozen students a daily connection with one teacher. With over 900 students, the middle school is organised into teams, called A Side, B Side, and C Side, each supported by a set of teachers. These smaller groups within the large middle school are intended to help meet students’ social, emotional, and academic needs. Besides the required courses (reading and language arts, math, science, social studies, and PE/health) students may take Chinese, French, or Spanish, strings, band, or choir, or a selection of electives including drama, art, technology, and cooking.

Student learning is supported in a number of ways in the middle school. A 1:1 laptop program was implemented in 2013–14. "Classroom Without Walls" takes each grade level to a regional destination for several days in the first month of school, and students develop relationships with peers and staff. Learning support teachers, school counsellors and the school psychologist work with small groups and individuals needing specialised support. The school uses a standards-based grading protocol.

The middle school occupies the central area of the SAS campus. Core classes are taught in classrooms grouped around large-group activity areas. Art, band, orchestra, choir, technology, cooking, health and dance occupy specially designed rooms. The middle school has its own playing field and library/media centre. Students share a 25-meter pool, gymnasiums, and fields with the high school, and eat in the open-air elementary-middle school cafeteria.

=== High School: grades 9–12 ===
The SAS high school offers a foundation of academic classes complemented by elective courses and after-school activities. Like many US college preparatory schools, course requirements ensure a comprehensive liberal arts education. The “international perspective” central to the school's mission statement is reflected in academic offerings, service opportunities, and extracurricular activities. Students with different learning styles, interests, and skills are accommodated. In recent years, the high school has launched several programs to ensure student wellbeing and foster community spirit. These include the advisory program and the reorganisation of the counselling department into two offices: one for social, emotional, and academic counselling and one for college counselling. The Student Government presides over the organisation of school spirit activities including assemblies, spirit weeks, and a newly introduced high-school-wide event known as Eddie's Great Games (EGG).

The high school offers 180 course options, and class size averages 17.1 students. Required credits include English, math, science, social studies, visual and performing arts, physical education, and health education. American citizens must earn one credit in American Studies or US History. All students must take two years of a foreign language (Chinese, French, Japanese or Spanish) or demonstrate proficiency in another language. Students also participate in a weeklong "Interim Semester" every year. This is a required off-campus experience that provides high school students with experiences beyond the traditional classroom. Beginning with the class of 2018, all students must complete a Catalyst Project. Elective options include classes in technology, engineering and robotics, journalism and media, and independent studies. Students may also take specialist courses through the Global Online Academy; may enrol in SAS's Summer Semester program; may enrol in the yearlong, nontraditional Quest program; and may study abroad in China, France, Italy, or Spain through School Year Abroad.

SAS currently offers 16 distinct AP courses, as well as the AP Capstone Diploma program. In May 2018, SAS students took 1,846 AP exams, with 96% receiving a score of 3 or higher, and 79% receiving a score of 4 or 5. The high school also offers 36 Advanced Topic (AT) courses. Developed by SAS teachers and vetted by university partners, these courses meet college-level standards of rigor and depth and emphasise student agency, project-based learning, and skills relevant to students' futures.

== Faculty ==
Approximately 395 faculty members work full-time at SAS. These teachers come from 21 different countries, with 59% being American and 13% Canadian. Other countries of origin include Australia, China, the United Kingdom, Singapore, New Zealand, and Spain. Eighty percent of SAS teachers have a master's degree in addition to a bachelor's degree, and 18 teachers hold a PhD. Teachers tend to be experienced, with over 70% having at least six years of teaching experience before arriving at SAS. SAS teachers' average stay at the school is 8.4 years. Currently, 60% of SAS teachers have over five years' tenure at the school, including 34% who have stayed a decade or more. The student-teacher ratio is 10.2:1, and class sizes are limited to 16 in the ELC and, with few exceptions, 22 for grades K–12.

== Academics ==
=== Curriculum ===
All curriculum at SAS is standards-based and aligned to current recommendations of US professional associations. Faculty are organised into professional learning communities (PLCs) that set essential learning targets and develop common assessments. PLCs also refine academic offerings to ensure that all students are appropriately challenged and supported in their learning.

SAS has identified seven critical skills it believes students need to be prepared for academic, professional, and interpersonal success in the twenty-first century. These seven "desired student learning outcomes," or DSLOs, include content knowledge, cultural competence, character, collaboration, communication, critical thinking, and creativity. Five "core values" are instilled in SAS students through programs, practices, and adult modelling. They include respect, responsibility, honesty, fairness, and compassion.

=== Testing ===
SAS student test scores consistently show a high level of academic achievement. Students in grades 3 through 9 take the Measures of Academic Progress (MAP) assessments in math, reading, and language use twice yearly. SAS students' average MAP scores are higher than average scores of students in the US and comparable regional international schools.

SAS began offering Advanced Placement courses in 1968, and over the years it has developed an extensive AP program. Today, over 90% of high school students take at least one AP exam during their time at SAS. Offering around 25 AP courses each year, SAS has one of the largest AP programs of any school outside the US in the spring of 2017, SAS students took 1,761 AP exams, with 93% receiving a score of 3 or higher, and 76% receiving a score of 4 or 5. 337 SAS students received an AP Scholar award from the College Board. This award recognises students who score 3 or higher on at least 3 AP exams.

=== College admissions ===
Students graduating from SAS overwhelmingly go on to college or university, and the application process is supported by a comprehensive college counselling program. Of the class of 2017, 89% went directly on to college or university, with 8% completing Singapore's National Service requirement (applicable to male Singaporean citizens or permanent residents) and 3% taking a gap year. Of those going directly on to college, 85% chose a US institution, 6% went to Canada, and the remainder attended British, Australian, and Asian universities.

== Co-curricular and extracurricular activities ==
=== Athletics ===
SAS offers physical education classes across all divisions, starting with perceptual motor classes in the early grades. Younger students may participate in after-school sports through the Elementary Activities and Athletics (EAA) program, which offers weekday, pay-as-you-go classes such as soccer, baseball, and karate.

Middle school students have PE (including health lessons) every second day. The all-inclusive MS after-school program includes many sports opportunities. Representative teams in soccer, cross-country, rugby, badminton, basketball, volleyball, track and field, tennis and swimming require try-outs and compete against other teams in the Athletic Conference of Singapore International Schools (ACSIS), of which SAS is a founding member. Clubs and intramural teams offer climbing, ultimate frisbee, soccer, lacrosse, table-tennis, dodgeball, basketball, volleyball, and cricket.

High school athletes try out for boys’ and girls’ freshman/reserve, junior varsity, and varsity teams, depending on age and ability. Sports include cross-country, soccer, volleyball, basketball, rugby, touch rugby, swimming, tennis, badminton, golf, softball, and track and field. Teams compete against ACSIS teams, teams from local schools, community teams, and sometimes teams from other international schools in the region. Besides playing locally, varsity teams participate in the Interscholastic Association of Southeast Asia (IASAS). This organisation, composed of six international schools with similar histories, was founded in 1982 to provide an organised, co-ordinated athletic conference for international competitions. Besides SAS, IASAS includes the International School of Kuala Lumpur, the International School of Bangkok, the Intercultural School of Jakarta, the International School of Manila, and Taipei American School. Each sport's season culminates with a competitive final tournament at one of the IASAS schools, hosted on a rotating schedule. Students stay with host school families, and develop both rivalries and friendships with the competition.

SAS students have many other sporting options. The SAS Community Sports and Activities (CSA) program offers sports such as baseball, swimming, volleyball, and soccer after school and on weekends. American football enthusiasts can play in the Singapore American Football League (SAFL), organised by the Singapore American Community Action Council (SACAC). Many SAS students participate in local teams and leagues, or take lessons from private coaches or through Singapore social clubs such as the American Club.

=== Extra-curricular clubs and activities ===
Students in the elementary school have a range of after-school options available to them through the EAA program. This provides pay-as-you-go participation in a number of extra classes in areas such as music, arts and crafts, and cooking.

Middle school students participate in teacher-led after-school activities at no extra cost. These include activities such as Caring for Cambodia, National History Day Club, Chess Club, Spanish Language Club, and Junior Model United Nations. Middle school students may also audition for the annual fall dance show and the annual spring play or musical. SAS National History Day Club students won prizes in the Junior Group Project division at the National History Day competitions in 2015 and 2016.

High school students run and participate in more than ninety clubs, organisations, and activities. These span a wide variety of interests and talents, and include athletic clubs, academic honour societies, academic interest clubs, environmental clubs, fine arts activities, language and cultural clubs, media and publications, music, dance, and theatre performances, service clubs, social clubs, and student government. SAS high school students participate in Model United Nations and compete in a variety of math competitions as well as Knowledge Bowl and Academic Quiz Club. Students compete in debate and forensics in the annual IASAS Cultural Conventions, which also include dance, drama, art and music. Student editors of The Eye school newspaper won the Straits Times National Youth Media Competition in 2014. In June 2017, six SAS high school students were the first in Singapore to send a science experiment to the International Space Station.

=== Community service ===
Community service has been part of the SAS experience since students began volunteering at a local hospital in the 1960s. Currently, the emphasis at all levels is for students to have hands-on service experiences. Elementary students participate in local charities’ efforts by visiting local schools and care homes and conducting fund-raisers like walkathons and readathons. Middle school students support causes they learn about in social studies and science classes, and also design independent service projects. Over half the high school extracurricular organisations are service clubs, such as Migrant Workers Outreach Program, Leprosy Home, Blue Planet Initiative, Medical Explorers Club, Gawad Kalinga, Global Issues Network, and Youth for Girls. Elected high school students make up the Executive Service Council, an umbrella organisation providing logistical and funding support for service clubs. Student fundraisers, parent organisations, and philanthropic donors also provide funding for service club efforts.

== Environmental initiatives ==
SAS incorporates environmental initiatives in its facilities planning and classroom activities. Sustainability measures include a large photovoltaic array, the conversion of a formerly air-conditioned cafeteria to an open-air space, enhancements to the school's rain forest and eco-garden, and the installation of low-flow faucets, more efficient chillers, and "green walls." The school's one-megawatt solar photovoltaic system includes nearly 3,500 panels on the school's rooftops, and earned the school a 2013 Solar Pioneer Award from Singapore's Economic Development Board. Singapore's Building and Construction Association awarded SAS a Green Mark "Gold" Award for sustainability in 2013. Student participation in the school's sustainability includes science projects studying how to cut down on paper-towel usage, student clubs running recycling efforts, and students helping with island-wide efforts such as the annual Coastal Cleanup Day.

== Food services ==
SAS students eat in three cafeterias: the elementary school cafeteria for grades K-2; the elementary-middle school cafeteria for grades 3–8; and the high school cafeteria, where the early learning centre children also eat in a designated area.

Food provider Hoe Brothers Catering has been working with all the school's sections since the 1960s, and alumni remember signature dishes with fondness. However, starting in the 2021 school year, the PTA voted to not renew Hoe Brothers contract to serve the High School, instead opting for French-based caterer Sodexo. Following student complaints about the quality and pricing of food under the new contract, Sodexo worked with the High School student government to collect and implement feedback.

The SAS cafeterias provide a variety of meals, including Asian, Western, and vegetarian options. Younger students buy set meals, while older students can choose from set meals or a la carte items. SAS works with a school nutritionist, and in recent years has moved toward alignment with USDA standards for school meals and snacks. Healthy changes include increasing amounts of fruits, vegetables, and whole grains in meals, using healthier oils and less sugar and salt, and eliminating sodas and sugary drinks from campus. In 2014, these changes were featured in an episode of MediaCorp Channel 5's TV show The Food Detectives.

== Parent support organisations ==
=== SAS Parent Teacher Association (PTA) ===
The PTA was founded in the same year as the school, and continues to encourage community participation in school events and support student learning opportunities. It is a separate legal entity with an elected board, and membership is automatic for school families and faculty members. The PTA organises classroom holiday parties, field trip chaperones, and special community events such as the Open House Ice Cream Social, the International Fair, and informative parent coffees. Volunteers also run the on-campus uniform store. Funds raised by the PTA support visiting authors and artists, library acquisitions, and scholarships.

=== SAS Eagles Booster Club ===
The SAS Eagles Booster Club is a parent organisation that supports SAS high school students. It started in 1985 to support student athletic teams, and quickly expanded its mission to include boosting school spirit and promoting teamwork and sportsmanship. Volunteers run the Booster Booth, which sells high school uniforms, spirit items, and school supplies. They also organise barbecues, spirit events, scholar luncheons, and the annual Trivia Night. Funds raised by the Boosters are used to support student clubs, productions, and teams, recognise academic achievements, and provide scholarships.

== School facilities ==
SAS occupies a 36-acre (15 ha) parcel of land near Singapore's northern coast. Opened in 1996 and expanded in 2004, the Woodlands campus is divided into three divisions: the elementary school for preschool through grade 5; the middle school for grades 6–8; and the high school for grades 9–12. School facilities include air-conditioned classrooms and purpose-designed spaces for science, language, music, drama, dance, art and cooking classes. The campus is about a 25-minute drive from downtown Singapore.

Other facilities of note include:

- 3 library-media centres (one per division)
- 2 elementary school pools and a 25-metre pool shared by the middle and high schools, with another full-size pool being built
- 6 gyms spread across the divisions, including the APEx Fitness and Wellness Centre
- an all-weather track
- 2 full-size football fields (one grass, one turf), as well as smaller elementary and middle school playing fields
- 3 baseball/softball fields with covered dugouts
- 5 tennis courts with lighting, and 4 tennis courts without lighting
- four theatres, including the school auditorium with Constellation Sound System
- three large and several smaller playgrounds
- an elementary school climbing wall and an air-conditioned middle school/high school climbing gym
- a high ropes course
- an eco-garden
- a 1.5-acre (0.61 ha) rainforest
- 2 nursing offices staffed by registered nurses
- 2 underground parking lots
- 2 parent-run stores selling uniforms, food and drinks, and spirit items
- a school book-room
- newly developed STEM laboratories
- AI-integrated classrooms and learning environments
- enhanced wellness and mental health spaces
- expanded Chinese language immersion classrooms

=== Facilities funded by the Elaine and Eduardo Saverin Foundation ===
In 2024, the Singapore American School received a S$20 million donation from the Elaine and Eduardo Saverin Foundation, a Singapore-based charitable organization co-founded by Elaine and Eduardo Saverin. The gift was directed toward enhancing STEM facilities, AI-enabled classrooms, Chinese language immersion programs, and student wellness infrastructure.

Elaine Saverin described the gift as a “significant and meaningful way for our family to demonstrate our commitment to the school” and expressed hope that it would benefit “current and future generations at Singapore American School.”

== Notable alumni ==
- Tammy Duckworth: US Senator from Illinois since 2016; Iraq War veteran; first disabled woman elected to congress;
- Michael P. Fay: SAS teen convicted of vandalism and theft in 1994 and sentenced to four months jail and six strokes of the cane; the case provoked extensive debate in Singapore and the United States about issues such as corporal punishment and the clash between "Western values" and "Asian values."
- Julia Nickson-Soul: actress
- Andrea Swift: mother of Taylor Swift

== Notable faculty ==
- Troy Blacklaws, South African writer, former teacher at SAS
