= Maximilian Osinski =

Austrian actor (born 1984)

- Born: 1 April 1984 (age 42); Eisenstadt, Burgenland, Austria
- Education: Syracuse University (BFA)
- Occupation: Actor
- Years active: 2007–present
- Height: 6 ft 4 in (193 cm)
- Spouse: Dichen Lachman (m. 2015)
- Children: 1

Maximilian Osinski (born 1 April 1984) is an American actor known for his recurring roles as Agent Davis on Agents of S.H.I.E.L.D. and Zava on Ted Lasso.

== Early life and education ==
Maximilian Osinski was born in a refugee camp in Austria to Polish parents, who fled their home in Szczecin, Poland for the U.S. in 1984. He was raised in Chicago, where he attended Maine East High School in Park Ridge, Illinois. His drama teacher helped him get into an acting program at Syracuse University's College of Visual and Performing Arts, where he earned a Bachelor of Fine Arts degree in 2006. At Syracuse, he studied abroad at the Shakespeare Globe Theatre in London and was selected to be a part of Sorkin Week program.

== Career ==
Osinski has acted on film, including Love & Other Drugs, The Express: The Ernie Davis Story and A Working Man. He makes a recurring appearance on Agents of S.H.I.E.L.D. as Agent Davis where his wife Dichen Lachman portrayed the villain in season 2. He co-wrote and co-produced the web series Hollywood Hitmen along with Enver Gjokaj, and starred opposite 'Scream Queen' Jordan Ladd and Australian actor Adam J. Yeend in the hit short film Brentwood Strangler.

In 2023, Osinski was cast as Zava in Ted Lasso.

== Personal life ==
Osinski has been married to Australian actress Dichen Lachman since January 2015. In May of the same year she gave birth to their daughter.

== Filmography ==
=== Film ===
Year	Title	Role	Notes
2007	Running Funny	Michael	
2008	The Express: The Ernie Davis Story	Gerhard Schwedes	
2010	Love & Other Drugs	Ned	
2011	Perfect	Aging Stud	Short film
2011	In Time	Louis	
2012	People Like Us	Telemarketer	
2012	K-11	Arresting Officer	
2013	Michael Comes Home	Jon	Short film
2013	Extraction	Lev	
2015	Brentwood Strangler	Richard Chase	Short film
2020	Greyhound	Eagle	
2021	Blackout	Jim Crowley	Short film
2025	A Working Man	Dimi Kolisnyk	
2025	Guns Up	Antonio	

=== Television ===
Year	Title	Role	Notes
2009	Taking Chance	Sgt. Neuman	TV movie
2009	Army Wives	Airman Pruitt	Episode: "Incoming"
2010	Three Rivers	Tommy Frisk	Uncredited; Episode: "Every Breath You Take"
2013–2020	Agents of S.H.I.E.L.D.	Agent Davis	27 episodes; Guest (season 1, 7); Recurring (season 4–6)
2014–2016	The Last Ship	Derek Evans	3 episodes
2015	Hollywood Hitmen	Max	Main cast; also writer and producer
2016–2018	The Nine Lives of Claw	Claw (voice)	Main cast
2018	Shameless	Len Martini	Episode: "Are You There Shim? It's Me, Ian."
2019	New Amsterdam	Angelo Russetti	Episode: "Happy Place"
2020	MacGyver	Anton	Episode: "Right + Wrong + Both + Neither "
2021	The Walking Dead: World Beyond	Dennis Graham	Recurring role (season 2); 9 episodes
2023	Ted Lasso	Zava	Recurring role (season 3)
2025	NCIS: Tony & Ziva	Boris	Main role
2026	Ann Droid	Chris	Recurring role (series 1); 2 episodes
