= Brentwood Strangler =

- Official release poster
- Directed by: John Fitzpatrick
- Written by: John Fitzpatrick
- Produced by: Ryan Dillon; John Fitzpatrick; Sarah Fitzpatrick; Adam J. Yeend
- Starring: Jordan Ladd; Adam J. Yeend; Maxamilian Osinski; Annika Marks; Cameron Daddo
- Cinematography: Nicholas Kaat
- Edited by: Marty Skibosh
- Music by: Aaron Goldstein
- Production company: Strangler Films LLC / Far From Everything Films
- Distributed by: WhereIsTheRockHammer
- Release date: December 1, 2015 (A Night of Horror International Film Festival)
- Running time: 19 minutes
- Countries: United States, Australia
- Language: English

Brentwood Strangler is a 2015 holiday-themed horror short film. It was written and directed by John Fitzpatrick following the success of his first short Skypemare, and stars 'scream queen' Jordan Ladd and Australian actor Adam J. Yeend in the title role. The film premiered December 2015 at the A Night of Horror Film Festival in Sydney, Australia, and had its U.S. premiere in early 2016 at the Hollywood Reel Independent Film Festival in Los Angeles where it won the jury award for Best Genre Short. The film has received critical acclaim from the independent horror community with multiple online reviews citing Fitzpatrick's writing, and the chemistry between the two leads. The film has screened at multiple festivals and horror conventions around the world including Shriekfest, Horrible Imaginings Film Festival, FilmQuest, and at Phoenix Comicon where it won the audience award for 'Best Horror'. The producing team went on to make the popular online series Scary Endings which is currently in its second season.

== Plot ==
It's the Christmas season in Los Angeles; Maggie (Jordan Ladd), a lonely woman goes on a blind date with a man unbeknownst to her that her date has been replaced by an active and notorious serial killer, The Brentwood Strangler (Adam J. Yeend). Is it love at first sight or is Maggie in for the worst (and last) date of her life?

== Production ==
The film was financed by Far From Everything Films and shot on location in Camarillo, California not only for cheaper studio rental but because street locations could be made to look similar to that of Brentwood, Los Angeles. Writer, Director John Fitzpatrick said in making the film he wanted to turn "back the clock to the days of Michael Curtiz, Billy Wilder and Alfred Hitchcock." Producer / Actor Adam J. Yeend was cast first in the role of the Strangler but asked to audition by Fitzpatrick followed by Jordan Ladd being cast in the lead role following an introduction from Skypemare actress Cerina Vincent; the two had worked together previously on Cabin Fever. Actress Annika Marks was asked to reprise her Skypemare role as Jenna and cameos along with producer Ryan Dillon reprising his role as Steve. Australian actors Cameron Daddo and Roxane Wilson also have cameo roles as news reporters. Maximilian Osinski was the final lead to be cast, a friend of Yeend's, Fitzpatrick felt the audience would buy that based on a single photo, it'd make sense for Maggie to confuse the two men in the story.

== Cast ==
- Jordan Ladd as Maggie
- Adam J. Yeend as Floyd Garrison, The Strangler
- Maximilian Osinski as Richard Chase
- Annika Marks as Jenna
- Ryan Dillon as Steve
- Cameron Daddo as Bruce Black
- Desean Terry as Officer Canon

== Awards and nominations ==
Year	Festival	Award	Result
2015	A Night of Horror International Film Festival - SYDNEY, AUSTRALIA	Best Short Film	Nominated
2016	Hollywood Reel Independent Film Festival - LOS ANGELES, CA	Best Genre Short	WON
2016	FilmQuest - SALT LAKE CITY, UTAH	Best Screenplay - Short	Nominated
2016	Phoenix Comicon - PHOENIX, ARIZONA	Audience Award - Best Horror Short	WON
2016	Fantasmagorical Film Festival - LOUISVILLE, KENTUCKY	Best Horror Comedy	WON
2016	Horrible Imaginings Film Festival - SAN DIEGO, CA	Best Actress - Short	Nominated - Jordan Ladd
2016	Haunted Horror Film Festival - TEXAS	Best of Fest Short Horror Film	WON
2016	Haunted Horror Film Festival - TEXAS	Best Director - Short Film	WON - John Fitzpatrick
2016	Haunted Horror Film Festival - TEXAS	Best Short Film Story	WON - John Fitzpatrick
2016	Haunted Horror Film Festival - TEXAS	Best Short Film Villain	WON - Adam J. Yeend
2016	Twister Alley International Film Festival - OKLAHOMA	Best Actress - Short	WON - Jordan Ladd
2016	Shriekfest - LOS ANGELES, CA	Festival Award - Best Short Film	Nominated
2017	Dam Short Film Festival - NEVADA	Festival Award - Best Sci-Fi / Horror	WON
