= Crissy Moran =

American actress (born 1975)

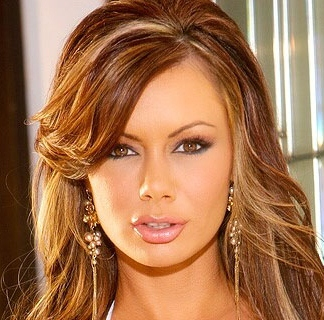
- Crissy Moran
- Born: December 22, 1975 (age 50); Jacksonville, Florida, U.S.
- Other names: Crissy M Crissy Outlaw (married name)
- Occupations: Actress; adult performer; model; public speaker
- Years active: 1999–2006
- Website: crissyoutlaw.com

Crissy Moran (born December 22, 1975) is an American Christian public speaker who is a former pornographic actress. She began working in adult entertainment in 1999, and between 2001 and 2006 had performed in over 50 adult films. In 2006, Moran became a devout Christian and quit working in the adult industry. After retirement, she began speaking about her experiences in porn and appearing in national media projects addressing what she considers "the harms of pornography," associating adult films with human sex trafficking and the exploitation of women and children.

== Career ==
=== Adult film ===
Moran's career in the adult industry began in the fall of 1999 when she responded to an internet ad for models. At the time, she was working at a Hooters restaurant in Jacksonville, Florida. However, she felt that the environment became degrading and she began seeking employment elsewhere. She left Hooters and began working in a variety of other jobs which included a local retail store, the County Clerk of Courts, and the Supervisor of Elections office.

One day, after posting bikini photos of herself on the Internet, she received email responses that led to her modeling in Miami and Los Angeles for Playboy and Hustler. She found greater financial success through establishing her own online pornography site. After moving to California, she eventually performed in over 50 mainstream porn films.

It was reported that Moran was making nearly $15,000 each month through her work in the porn business, along with receipts from her successful website. However, in October 2006, she became a Christian and announced that she was leaving the sex industry. Moran recounts her conversion during a visit to her boyfriend:

During my [visit, I went to one of his shoots]. While there, one of his friends got a text message … guys there started passing it around laughing. I asked what they were looking at and they told me it was one of their wives posing topless. Out of nowhere I got really angry and I said I would hope that when I'm married that my husband would not be passing around pictures of me topless or nude. Everybody started laughing, but the guy to my left said "when I get married I wouldn't show pictures like that to anyone". I was in shock! Later on that day, he and I started talking. He asked me what I did for a living. I said modeling. He asked me what kind and kept prying. Eventually I told him I did pornography. He said he knew already and that my boyfriend had told the guys and then he asked me if I believed in God. I told him yes and he proceeded to preach the Gospel to me. I started crying and he asked me if I wanted to rededicate my life. I said yes. [After that], I didn't do any more shoots and stopped accepting any income from pornography.

=== Post-adult career ===
Though Moran left the pornography industry in 2006, pornographic photos and videos taken during her time working in the adult entertainment industry continue to remain online. Although efforts to date have been unsuccessful, Moran continues to attempt to have her photos legally removed from these web sites established by past boyfriends and business partners. Moran stated that she "maintained contact with many of the people that promoted my website. There was a forum they'd use to promote the site where they would post comments and I would [tell them to] take my website down. Eventually they just blocked me."

In 2012, Moran appeared in the documentary After Porn Ends, which examined the lives of former pornographic actors.

In 2013, Moran worked for Treasures, a 501(c)3 nonprofit founded in 2003 by a former dancer to help women heal from what she calls "sexual brokenness." As of 2020, Moran is represented by her friend, and bridesmaid, Emily Hibard. The two met in Los Angeles while volunteering at Treasures. Moran is a presenter at the National Center on Sexual Exploitation's Annual Summit.

=== Mainstream film career ===
Prior to her retirement from the porn industry, Moran had a role as "Tree Girl #1" in Nick Palumbo's theatrically released NC-17 horror film Murder-Set-Pieces (2004).

In 2008, Moran appeared in the short dramatic film Oversold, which was a modern adaptation based on the Biblical story of Hosea and Gomer, in which she plays the leading role. Director Paul Morrell had approached Moran, originally wishing her to be a consultant for the adult business side of the story, but after discussing the project with her, he realized she would be perfect in the lead role.

In 2011, Moran had a minor role in another Paul Morell project, the indie horror film Filth to Ashes, Flesh to Dust.

=== Appearances ===
Moran was featured in a The 700 Club interview about her life, experience in the adult industry, and her religious experiences.

== Personal life ==
Moran has stated that she had a religious upbringing and she was encouraged by her father not to have sex until marriage. She stated that the end of her parents' marriage when she was a child resulted in her being a "rebellious teenager".

In May 2013, she married a youth pastor. 10 years later, on 1 December 2023, she announced on her Instagram page that they mutually filed for divorce. She currently lives in Texas.

== See also ==
- Anti-pornography movement in the United States
