= Scary Endings =

- Official Series Poster Art
- Genre: Horror; Supernatural; Thriller; Comedy
- Starring: Ryan Dillon; Adrienne Smith; Adam J. Yeend; Jordan Ladd; Dichen Lachman; Kaitlin Doubleday; Tahyna Tozzi; Lou Ferrigno Jr. Sarah Scott; Miracle Laurie; Damien Bodie; Gates McFadden
- Country of origin: United States
- Original language: English
- No. of seasons: 2
- No. of episodes: 16

Production
- Producers: Brian Chandler; Jessica Chandler; Ryan Dillon; John Fitzpatrick; Sarah Fitzpatrick; Adam J. Yeend
- Cinematography: Nicholas Kaat
- Editors: Brian Chandler; John Fitzpatrick
- Running time: 6 minutes
- Production company: Strangler Films LLC

Original release
- Release: July 11, 2015

Scary Endings is a horror anthology series currently airing on the YouTube channel WhereIsTheRockHammer.

Each episode is directed by John Fitzpatrick, director of Skypemare and Brentwood Strangler. The series is produced by Brian Chandler, Jessica Chandler, Ryan Dillon, John Fitzpatrick, Sarah Fitzpatrick, and Adam J. Yeend. Being an anthology series, each episode features a new cast with different characters and a stand-alone story in the vein of Tales from the Crypt. The series is currently in its second season and has garnered a strong online fan following and critical acclaim within the horror community, having also screened at several horror film festivals and receiving continued coverage from multiple horror media outlets, including Blumhouse.com, Dread Central, and HorrorBuzz. The series is filmed in Los Angeles, California.

== Production ==
The series is self-financed by six producers Brian Chandler, Jessica Chandler, Ryan Dillon, John Fitzpatrick, Sarah Fitzpatrick, and Adam J. Yeend, with each episode estimated to cost under $1000. Each episode is directed by John Fitzpatrick with Nicholas Kaat as cinematographer. Writing credits have been shared around between the producers.

== Episodes ==
Episodes are uploaded roughly one month apart. Season one consists of 10 episodes and season two has aired five. "Welcome to the Circus" is the series' most viewed episode followed by "The Grinning Man". The fourth episode of the first season, "Yummy Meat: A Halloween Carol", is the only episode to be written by a writer outside of the producing team; it premiered at the 2015 Screamfest Horror Film Festival. Two episodes, "The Grinning Man" and "Am I Beautiful?", are based on known urban legends. The season-two episode "The Water Rises", which deals with a couple trapped in a sinking elevator on a cruise ship, received the most online coverage and is considered the most ambitious episode on a technical level; it was also praised for its emotional intensity.

| No. | Title | Directed by | Written by | Original release date |
|---|---|---|---|---|
| 1.1 | "We Always Come Back" | John Fitzpatrick | John Fitzpatrick | July 11, 2015 |
Jim is haunted by more than just the memories of his wife Sasha. At night, they always come back. Guest starring: Ryan Dillon as Jim, Tahyna Tozzi as Sasha
| 1.2 | "Voyeur" | John Fitzpatrick | Brian Chandler | August 1, 2015 |
Grace and Rick thought they were going to be spending their romantic weekend alone...are they? Who's watching you? Guest starring: Jordan Ladd as Grace, Ryan Dillon as Rick, Michael Osborne as 'Creepy Michael'
| 1.3 | "The Babysitter and the Boogeyman" | John Fitzpatrick | John Fitzpatrick | October 6, 2015 |
A child's warnings of a "scary man" in the house are too easily dismissed by his babysitter Katrina (Adrienne Smith) as she soon learns when she heads home for the night - someone or something is following her home... Guest starring: Adrienne Smith as Katrina, Casey Kooyman as The Boogeyman, Mike Estes Derek, Maracilda Garcia as Mother, Miles Chandler as Arturo
| 1.4 | "Yummy Meat: A Halloween Carol" | John Fitzpatrick | Sean Decker | October 18, 2015 |
Amber is a snarky dentist who hands out toothbrushes to the neighborhood kids, only to discover that one of them may soon be brushing bits of her from his teeth. Guest starring: Miracle Laurie as Amber, Lou Ferrigno Jr. as The Werewolf, Luke Albright as Jack, Lucas Jaye as Little Wolf
| 1.5 | "Bounce House of Horror!" | John Fitzpatrick | Jessica Chandler and John Fitzpatrick | November 15, 2015 |
Concerned moms Dawn and Jaime wonder why their children haven't come out of a mysterious bounce house in the middle of the park; the mystery turns to horror when Dawn sends her husband Dave to investigate. Guest starring: Sarah Scott as Dawn, Betsy Currie as Jaime, Michael Alperin as Dsve, Miles Chandler as Matty
| 1.6 | "He's Right Behind You" | John Fitzpatrick | John Fitzpatrick | December 20, 2015 |
A woman sits in her apartment on a stormy night, alone - or is she? Not according to the mysterious text messages appearing on her phone with the words, "I See You!". Guest starring: Camilla Jackson as Heather, Ryan Dillon as The Stalker
| 1.7 | "Smother Mother" | John Fitzpatrick | Brian Chandler | January 24, 2016 |
After the mysterious and suspicious death of his overbearing mother, Greg gets a visit from his brother Brad and sister in law Havala. But when some mysterious messages start appearing on Mother's old typewriter, it's evident that mother might not be completely gone. Guest starring: Damien Bodie as Gregory, Michael Osborne as Brad, Kimberly Leemans as Havala
| 1.8 | "U Get What U Deserve" | John Fitzpatrick | Brian Chandler | March 20, 2016 |
During the Donald Trump presidential era, Kagan is the victim of a terrifying home invasion - when she calls 911 for help she quickly finds the newly implemented 911 operating system does not offer help as willingly as it used to. With the intruder in the house, Kagan's life choices could mean a long wait before help arrives. Guest starring: Gates McFadden as The 911 Operator (voice), Atsuko Okatsuka as Kagan, Mike Estes as The Intruder, Adam J. Yeend as Gary Gray
| 1.9 | "The Grinning Man" | John Fitzpatrick | Adam J. Yeend | April 24, 2016 |
Based on the urban legend of Indrid Cold / The Grinning Man. While house sitting his aunt's house, Karl Ardo gets a strange phone call in the middle of the night from an entity calling himself Indrid Cold - also known as The Grinning Man. As Karl goes to confront the stranger at the front door, he is about to experience something terrifying and unimaginable. Guest starring: Adam J. Yeend as Karl Ardo, Grant Geller as The Grinning Man/Indrid Cold, Dichen Lachman as Laura (voice)
| 1.10 | "Welcome to the Circus" | John Fitzpatrick | John Fitzpatrick | May 29, 2016 |
On a stormy night while babysitting her nephew Andrew, Aunt Brandy finds herself stalked by a clown who's straight out of her nephew's toy Jack in the Box. The circus has come to town... Guest starring: Adrienne Smith as Brandy, Guilford Adams as Jack Box, Miles Chandler as Andrew
| 2.1 (11) | "The Nightmare" | John Fitzpatrick | John Fitzpatrick | November 6, 2016 |
Kim's sleep is disrupted when a demonic goblin enters her dream, determined to manifest itself in the real world. With her husband Brad right beside her but unaware of what's going inside her mind, will Kim wake up before it's too late? Guest starring: Carlee Baker as Kim, James Monarski as Brad, Chris Schellenger as The Demon
| 2.2 (12) | "Santa Claus is a Vampire" | John Fitzpatrick | Jessica Chandler | December 4, 2016 |
Happily married couple Sharon and Cody are returning home with this year's Christmas tree when an unexpected encounter with Vampire Santa Claus leaves Sharon sole defender of her home where no one is safe, not her son, the babysitter Holly or even herself. Can she stop Santa from coming down that chimney? Traditional vampire rules apply... Guest starring: Hannah Marshall as Sharon Bradley, Ryan Dillon as Cody Bradley, Charlotte Chimes as Holly, Casey Kooyman as Vampire Santa, Miles Chandler as Barry Bradley
| 2.3 (13) | "The Water Rises" | John Fitzpatrick | John Fitzpatrick | January 3, 2017 |
On New Year's Eve, newlyweds Jennifer and Matt are enjoying a tropical cruise for their honeymoon when disaster strikes the ship trapping the couple in an elevator at the bowels of the ship. As the elevator sinks, the water rises, and time is running short to for these newlyweds to escape for air. Guest starring: Kaitlin Doubleday as Jennifer, Adam J. Yeend as Matt, Cerina Vincent as Becky (voice), Ryan Dillon as Rescue Crewman (voice)
| 2.4 (14) | "Am I Beautiful?" | John Fitzpatrick | John Fitzpatrick | April 3, 2017 |
Based on the Japanese Urban Legend of Kuchisake-onna (The Slit-Mouthed Woman) She'll ask you a question, answer correctly and she'll spare your life but at a cost - May and Zach are moving into their new home unbeknownst to the evil spirit haunting their bathroom mirror - the Slit-Mouthed Woman. Guest starring: Sarah Scott as May, Belinda Gosbee as The Slit-Mouthed Woman (Kuchisake-onna), Abraham Martinez as Zack, Candice Fox as Becca
| 2.5 (15) | "There's Something Out There" | John Fitzpatrick | John Fitzpatrick | May 26, 2017 |
Taking refuge inside of her broken-down car, trying to get a signal on her cell phone, Riley’s (Leah de Niese) time is running out as something out in the desert wilderness is getting closer and closer… Guest starring: Leah de Niese as Riley
| 2.6 (16) | "Party Crasher" | John Fitzpatrick | Brian Chandler | June 8, 2018 |
Ben wakes to find himself covered in dishware and a masked intruder looming above him; it's simple - if he moves and drops a plate, his wife Beth will die. Frozen and unable to move, Ben has no choice but to keep still, or does he? As the intruder reveals himself to Beth in the other room, it turns out this intruder's choice in victim is anything but random. Guest starring: Ryan Dillon as Ben, Jai Koutrae as Casey, Camilla Jackson as Beth
