= Kaitlin Doubleday =

American actress

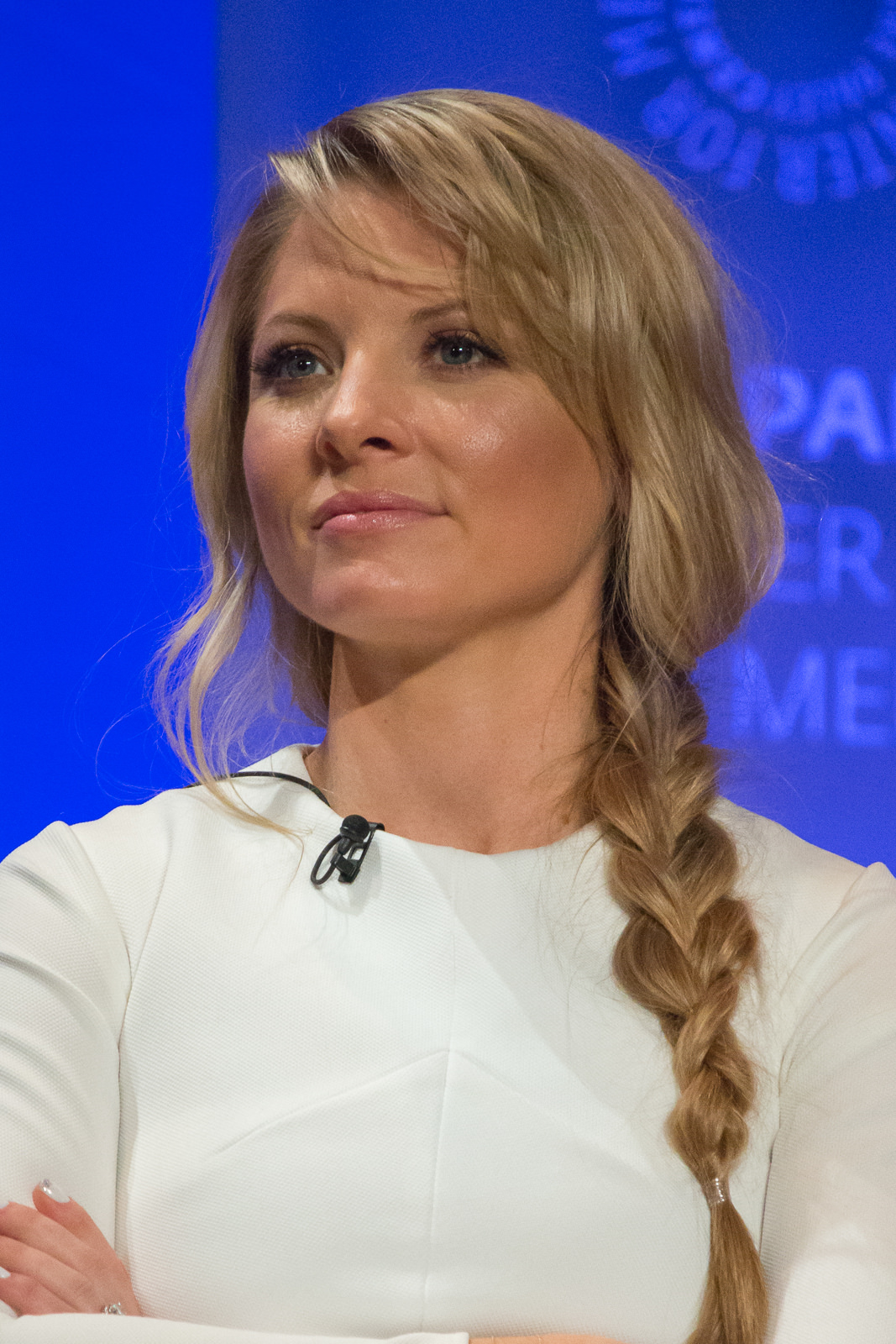
- Doubleday at PaleyFest Los Angeles, 2016
- Born: Kaitlin Doubleday; Los Angeles, California, U.S.
- Occupation: Actress
- Years active: 2002–present
- Spouse: Devin Lucien (m. 2016)
- Children: 1
- Parents: Frank Doubleday; Christina Hart
- Family: Portia Doubleday (sister)

Kaitlin Doubleday is an American actress. She played a number of supporting film roles in her early career, including in Waiting... (2005) and Accepted (2006). From 2015 to 2016, she starred as Rhonda Lyon in the Fox musical prime time soap opera Empire. In 2017, Doubleday joined the cast of CMT musical drama series Nashville, playing Jessie Caine. In 2019, she appeared as the lead in Christmas at Graceland: Home for the Holidays.

== Early life ==
Doubleday, who was born and raised in Los Angeles, is the elder of two daughters raised by Frank Doubleday and Christina Hart. She grew up in a show business family: her parents are former professional actors, and her younger sister, Portia, is an actress as well. Her mother works in the entertainment industry as a playwright and also as a producer in the theater. She attended the Music Academy at Hamilton High School in Los Angeles.

== Career ==
Doubleday made her acting debut in an episode of the CBS procedural Without a Trace in 2002 and in the same year appeared in the feature film Catch Me If You Can. She graduated to supporting roles in films Waiting... (2005), The TV Set (2006) and Accepted (2006). In 2007, she starred in the ABC comedy series, Cavemen. The series received negative reviews and was canceled after a month on the air. In the following years, Doubleday continued performing on television, with small parts on CSI: Miami, Brothers & Sisters, Bones, The Closer, Criminal Minds, Drop Dead Diva and Witches of East End. Doubleday also performed in the recurring role of Logan Louis in the HBO comedy series Hung in 2011.

In 2015, Doubleday began starring in the Fox musical prime time soap opera Empire. She played Rhonda Lyon, wife of the eldest son in the Lyon family. Also in 2015, she was cast in the independent drama film Po directed by John Asher, about a single father raising a son with autism. Doubleday also appeared as a celebrity guest on The CW improvisational comedy show Whose Line Is It Anyway in June 2016. In 2017, she featured in the popular horror series Scary Endings alongside Australian actor Adam J. Yeend in an episode titled "The Water Rises".

In 2017, Doubleday joined the cast of CMT musical drama series Nashville in its fifth season, following the departure of original series star Connie Britton. She portrayed Jessie Caine, a singer/songwriter. Her character was introduced during the series' 100th episode on June 15, 2017.

In 2019, Doubleday played the female lead in Christmas at Graceland: Home for the Holidays. Doubleday's character plans a successful Elvis-themed Christmas exhibit amidst a larger fundraiser on the grounds of Graceland. The performance drew on Doubleday's acting and singing abilities.

== Personal life ==
In May 2015, Doubleday became engaged to Devin Lucien, a DJ, in Paris. She and Lucien married on May 6, 2016 in Big Sur. The couple has a son, born in 2019.

== Filmography ==
=== Film ===
Year	Title	Role	Notes
2002	Catch Me If You Can	Joanna	
2004	Freshman Orientation	Amanda	
2005	Waiting...	Amy	
2006	The TV Set	Jesse Filmore	
2006	Accepted	Gwynn	
2009	The Tomb	Rowena	
2011	Final Sale	Kate Johnson	
2012	The March Sisters at Christmas	Meg March	Television film
2012	Famous	Gretchen	Short film
2013	The Magic Bracelet	Lainey	Short film
2013	Friend Request/Chance at Romance	Celeste Jeffers-Johnson	Television film
2015	Inversion	AJ	
2015	Dragon Warriors	Ennogard	
2016	A Boy Called Po	Amy	
2019	Christmas at Graceland: Home for the Holidays	Harper Ellis	Television film (Hallmark Channel)
2020	Love on Iceland	Chloe	Television film
2021	Debbie Macomber's A Mrs. Miracle Christmas	Laurel McCullough	Television film
2022	High Heat	Mimi	Television film
2025	Bad Man	Tammy	

=== Television ===
Year	Title	Role	Notes
2002	Without a Trace	Becky Radowsky / Eve Cleary	Episode: "Between the Cracks"
2003	Strong Medicine	Julie Windsor	Episode: "Misdiagnosis Murder"
2004	Cold Case	Holly Richardson	Episode: "Hubris"
2006	Justice	Elizabeth Morris	Episode: "Filicide"
2007	Cavemen	Kate McKinney	Series regular
2008	CSI: Miami	Amanda Brighton	Episode: "Tunnel Vision"
2009	Brothers & Sisters	Chelsea Yeager	Episodes: "It's Not Easy Being Green" and "Owning It"
2009	Bones	Karin Lin	Episode: "The Plain in the Prodigy"
2010	The Closer	Linda	Episode: "Layover"
2010	Criminal Minds	Kelly Landis	Episode: "Reflection of Desire"
2011	CSI: Crime Scene Investigation	Evan Ferrari	Episode: "Hitting for the Cycle"
2011	Chase		Episode: "Seven Years"
2011	Drop Dead Diva	Cassie	Episodes: "You Bet Your Life" and "Toxic"
2011	Childrens Hospital	Female Intern	Episode: "Newsreaders"
2011	Hung	Logan Lewis	Recurring role, 3 episodes
2013	Royal Pains	Ally Cunningham	Episode: "Pins And Needles"
2013	Witches of East End	Elyse	Episode: "Electric Avenue"
2014	Mixology	Trista	Episodes: "Jessica & Ron" and "Closing Time"
2015–2016, 2018	Empire	Rhonda Lyon	Main cast (seasons 1–2), guest cast (3–4)
2016	Whose Line is it Anyway?	Herself	Season 12 episode 5
2017	Scary Endings	Rebecca	Episode: "The Water Rises"
2017–2018	Nashville	Jessie Caine	Main cast (seasons 5–6)
