= Anguish (2015 film) =

- Official poster
- Directed by: Sonny Mallhi
- Written by: Sonny Mallhi
- Produced by: Guy Danella; Ed Koziarski; Sonny Mallhi; Mike McNamara; Kho Wong
- Starring: Ryan Simpkins; Annika Marks; Karina Logue
- Cinematography: Amanda Treyz
- Edited by: Andrew Coutts; Matt Diezel
- Music by: James Curd
- Release dates: July 21, 2015 (Fantasia Fest); December 18, 2015 (United States)
- Running time: 91 minutes
- Country: United States
- Language: English

Anguish is a 2015 American horror film written and directed by Sonny Mallhi. It marks his directorial debut. The film had its world premiere on July 21, 2015 at the Fantasia International Film Festival and stars Ryan Simpkins as a young woman whose mental issues may be a result of the paranormal.

== Plot ==
A teenage girl named Lucy (Amberley Gridley) and her mother Sarah (Karina Logue) are driving when Lucy asks her mother if she can go on a camping trip. When Sarah tells Lucy no, Lucy angrily gets out of the car only to be hit by an oncoming car.

Tess (Ryan Simpkins), a teenage girl that has suffered for years from what appears to be mental instability, has moved into a new house with her mother Jessica (Annika Marks), hoping to have a new start. As Tess and her mother are settling in, Tess skateboards by the road where Lucy was hit-while observing the cross that has Lucy's picture on it, an unseen force pushes Tess down in the dirt and won't let her leave. Eventually Tess is able to get up and walk home but is now beginning to see phenomena that Tess attributes to her hallucinations. Tess eventually comes upon Sarah's bookstore and says something to Sarah that only Lucy would know, which leaves Sarah suspicious. Eventually, Tess is forced to confront her hallucinations and looks into a mirror and witnesses her eye color changing from blue to brown repeatedly. After having what seems like a mental breakdown, Tess eventually collapses by the front door just as Jessica returns from work. Tess is taken to the hospital where she is put on constant supervision, medication and therapy. A priest from Jessica's local church comes by to see Tess and suggests that possession may be involved.

Tess is discharged and returns to her bedroom to see that Jessica boarded up Tess' bedroom window for Tess' protection. After still exhibiting paranormal phenomena and refusing to eat, Jessica is driving Tess into town when Tess suddenly lunges from the car and runs off into a neighborhood and eventually reaches Sarah and Lucy's house. Tess embraces Sarah while Jessica, who had followed Tess, looks on in confusion and fear. While 'Tess' explores Lucy's bedroom, Sarah explains to Jessica that Tess may have a gift where she can channel spirits and let them take possession of her own body so they can say goodbye to their loved ones and move on. Sarah believes that Lucy has taken possession of Tess and that by talking to Lucy through Tess' body, she can convince Lucy to move on. At first, Lucy says she does not want to leave and that Tess does not want to return because she is tired of the doctors and constant medicine but Sarah tells Lucy that moving on is the right thing to do and Lucy eventually agrees. Lucy leaves Tess' body, but another spirit has apparently entered Tess' body and lunges from the bed and tries to run away only to have Sarah and Jessica lock Tess in the basement. Jessica goes down to find Tess, promising that she'll do better as a parent, only to have 'Tess' run up and fight with her. After a struggle, Jessica is looking at Tess in fear when Lucy reenters Tess' body and wants to see her mother.

Lucy asks for one more night with her mother and Jessica agrees. After the night is over, Sarah tells Lucy that it's time to move on and Lucy exits Tess' body, finding herself in a type of spirit world surrounded by other spirits. Lucy wanders until she finds Tess who reveals that she wants to go back and hugs Lucy. Suddenly, an invisible force attacks Lucy and a bright light appears to signify that Lucy has moved on. Tess returns to her body and life seems to go back to normal, her mother not sure if Tess has improved or not. Later, in the coffee shop, Tess is asked her name but doesn't reply. Back at home, Tess is playing and singing a song (the same one Lucy made up while swinging) on her guitar; she looks up and her eye color changes from blue to brown.

== Cast ==
- Ryan Simpkins as Tess
- Annika Marks as Jessica
- Karina Logue as Sarah
- Cliff Chamberlain as Robert
- Amberley Gridley as Lucy
- Ryan O'Nan as Father Meyers
- Paulina Olszynski as Morgan
- Anthony Corrado as Anthony
- Anthony Corrado as Peter

== Reception ==
Rotten Tomatoes, a review aggregator, reports that 62% of 13 surveyed critics gave the film a positive review; the average rating is 5.5/10. Michael Gingold of Fangoria called it "the creepiest and most resonant American independent horror film since It Follows". Much of the film's praise centered on its acting, particularly that of Simpkins, and its predominantly-female cast, which Film School Rejects considered "especially satisfying". Twitch Film also praised Anguish, stating that it was "a thrilling debut from Sonny Mallhi" and that the "results are quietly horrifying and heartbreaking." Frank Scheck of The Hollywood Reporter wrote, "Although elegantly shot, powerfully acted and possessing a forbiddingly ominous atmosphere, Anguish is too exploitative for the artsy crowd and too subtle for genre fans." Peter Bradshaw of The Guardian rated it 2/5 stars and wrote, "Sonny Mallhi’s non-scary thriller offers neither supernatural chills nor real-world psychological insights."
