= Miracle Laurie =

American actress

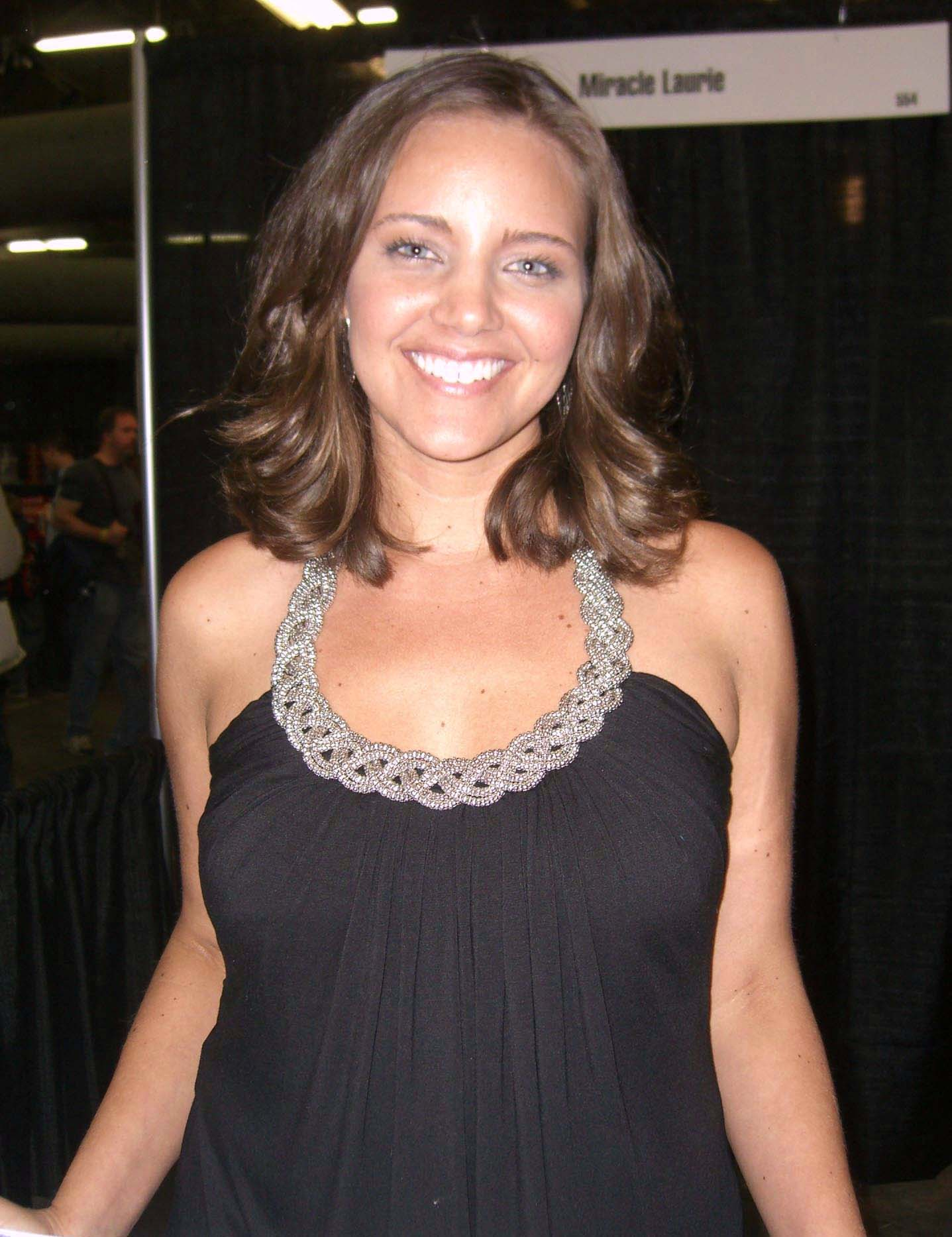
- Laurie at the Big Apple Convention in Manhattan, October 17, 2009.
- Born: August 1, 1981 (age 44); Huntington Beach, California, U.S.
- Occupation: Actress
- Years active: 2004–present

Miracle Laurie (born August 1, 1981) is an American actress, best known for portraying Mellie on the Joss Whedon drama Dollhouse.

== Career ==
Laurie started towards a professional acting career at Orange Coast College, where she was part of the student-run repertory theatre. She also appeared in several faculty-directed shows at the school. Notable roles from this period include Belle Starr and other female roles in Jessie and the Bandit Queen in 2000 and Ariel in William Shakespeare's The Tempest in 2001.

Laurie's first credited TV role was sorority sister Veronica in "Team", a 2004 episode of Medical Investigation. In 2009, she played Elsa in the pilot episode of The Cabonauts.

That same year, Joss Whedon cast Laurie in his show Dollhouse, which depicted a secret corporation that recruits troubled young people, stores their memories in a computer, wipes their minds (turning them into "dolls"), imprints them with new personalities, and rents them to wealthy people for special assignments. Her first major dramatic role, Laurie played a supporting character named Mellie. She also dances and plays the ukulele in Uke Box Heroes, a ukulele cover band that she co-formed with her husband.

Laurie and her mother, Cathy Anne, appeared as members of the audience in the October 6, 2010 episode of The Late Late Show with Craig Ferguson, and participated in Ferguson's opening monologue during the cold open.

== Filmography ==
=== Film ===
Year	Title	Role	Notes
2012	Wyatt Earp's Revenge	Fannie Garretson	video
2012	Any Day Now	Monica	
2012	100,000 Zombie Heads	Blazcaff	
2013	Scenic Route	Joanne	
2014	Lust for Love	Jenny	
2014	Any Other Friday	Cindy	Short
2017	Nobility	Alethes	
2017	Watch the Sky	Laura Neary	
2018	Insane Jane: Taco Tuesday	Jane Travers / Avenging Star	Short
2019	2177: The San Francisco Love Hacker Crimes	Det. Lister	
	Mesmerized	Sara Hawthorne	Post-production

=== Television ===
Year	Title	Role	Notes
2004	Medical Investigation	Veronica	Episode: "Team"
2009	The Cabonauts	Elsa	Episode: "Pilot"
2009–2010	Dollhouse	November	Recurring role
2011	Goodnight Burbank	Elizabeth Chivers	Main role
2012	Singled Out	Mak	TV film
2013	Shelf Life	Nunja	Episodes: "Hero Worship", "Pristine", "Shelf of the Dead, Part 1"
2014	Corporate	Samantha Adams	TV film
2015	Scary Endings	Amber	Episode: "Yummy Meat: A Halloween Carol"
2015	Gen Zed	Christine (voice)	TV series
2022	The Afterparty	Quiet Heather	TV series, 3 episodes
