= It Waits =

- Promotional poster
- Directed by: Steven R. Monroe
- Written by: Richard Christian Matheson; Thomas E. Szollosi; Stephen J. Cannell
- Produced by: Stephen J. Cannell; Michael Dubelko
- Starring: Cerina Vincent; Dominic Zamprogna; Greg Kean
- Cinematography: Jon Joffin
- Edited by: Alan Cody; Kevin D. Ross
- Music by: Corey A. Jackson
- Production companies: Cannell Films; Centaurus Films
- Distributed by: New Arc Entertainment (Worldwide); Anchor Bay Entertainment (USA)
- Release dates: October 13, 2005 (Germany); May 23, 2006 (USA)
- Running time: 88 minutes
- Countries: United States; Canada
- Language: English
- Budget: $1.2 million (estimated)

It Waits is a 2005 horror film directed by Steven R. Monroe and starring Cerina Vincent, Dominic Zamprogna, and Greg Kean. Written by Richard Christian Matheson, Thomas E. Szollosi, and Stephen J. Cannell, the film is about a forest ranger who tries to escape the demons of her past, only to find out the forest has demons of its own. Filmed on location in British Columbia, Canada, It Waits was a direct-to-DVD release in the United States and worldwide. The film is a co-production between the United States and Canada.

== Plot ==
In a remote national forest, five archaeology students discover a cave associated with an ancient Native American legend. Using explosives to gain entrance, they find prehistoric drawings and bones strewn across the cave floor. Suddenly, a creature emerges from the shadows and slaughters them all.

Two months later, on a ranger station tower in the same forest, ranger Danielle "Danny" St. Claire (Cerina Vincent) gets drunk and cries. Danny blames herself for the car crash that killed her best friend Julie. Her superior Rick Bailey (Greg Kean) announces that she will stay at the station alone for the next few days. He also instructs her to drain off water to relieve the pressure on the Devil's Gate Dam, where cracks have ben spotted. That night, awakened by nightmares of the accident, Danny hears sounds coming from outside. Descending the tower to investigate, she discovers claw marks on the tool shed door.

The next morning, Danny's colleague and boyfriend Justin Rawley (Dominic Zamprogna) arrives to keep her company. After inspecting the dam, they return to the station for a romantic dinner. Danny confesses she was the one driving the car when it crashed, and she allowed the police to believe Julie was driving. Justin consoles her and they make love. During the night, awakened by the emergency siren, they discover that something sabotaged the satellite dish, Justin's jeep and the radio.

The next day, they head to the dam to use its radio. On the way, they meet campers Carl and Evelyn Nash, who ignore Justin's warnings and head out on their own, only to be killed later by the creature. At the dam, Justin and Danny find the radio room completely trashed. They return to the station to find Evelyn's bloody corpse swings down from the ceiling on a chain, and when they rush outside, Carl's body is thrown off the roof at them. Justin heads off alone to get help, but the creature ambushes and viciously kills him.

The next morning, Danny finds Justin severed head in the tool shed and his bloody body on the roof. She buries his remains and arms herself. That night the creature attacks the station, but Danny is able to shoot and wound it.

The next morning, Danny follows the creature's blood trail to the cave and sees the teacher of the students who were killed. He explains the creature is a demon drawn to Danny's negative energy—her guilt over her friend's death. Back at the station, Danny finds the corpses of the Nashes and Justin dug up and arranged around the table, with Justin's head on a plate. She hunts the creature, but is unsuccessful and gets wounded in the leg. She finds the Nashes' cellphone and calls Rick and tells him to bring the SWAT team, but he dismisses her request, believing she is drunk.

The next day, Rick arrives at the station alone and accompanies Danny to the cave. On the way, they discover the teacher's body impaled on a pole. The creature flies by and drops Justin's body onto Rick, crushing him to death. Danny drives to the cave, with the creature in close pursuit. The creature lands on the hood, she drives directly into the cave. Using the dynamite, she seals the cave with the creature trapped inside. She returns to the station, lays her ranger badge on the table, and then leaves.

Sometime later, Danny tells a policeman about the killings but says she doesn't know who did it. Then she confesses to being the driver in the crash that killed Julie, accepting responsibility for her friend's death.

== Cast ==
- Cerina Vincent as Danielle "Danny" St. Claire
- Dominic Zamprogna as Justin Rawley
- Greg Kean as Rick Bailey
- Eric Schweig as Joseph Riverwind
- Matt Jordon as Wakinyah Creature
- Miranda Frigon as Julie Cassidy
- Sean Wei Mah as Ben Wheelock
- Tinsel Korey as Lark Rainwater
- Fred Henderson as Carl Nash
- Chilton Crane as Evelyn Nash
- Sean Campbell as Lt. Morris Black
- Michael Bell as Voice of Hoppy

== Production ==
=== Development ===
It Waits was directed by Steven R. Monroe. The original screenplay was written by Richard Christian Matheson and Thomas E. Szollosi, and was initially purchased by a French producer who intended to shoot the film in the United Kingdom. After this initial deal fell through due to lack of financing, Stephen J. Cannell purchased the project for his production company and signed a deal with IDT Entertainment/Anchor Bay. Cannell rewrote the original script, changing the lead male character "Mike" to a female forest ranger. Cannell also added the love story between Danny and Justin.

=== Casting ===
Cerina Vincent was director Steven R. Monroe's first choice to play the lead character Danny. Monroe was convinced that Vincent could bring to the role an appeal to both men and women, and that she could deliver the dramatic scenes in the film. Cannell also felt that Vincent had the talent to carry the film. After appearing in Cabin Fever in 2002, Vincent was not eager to do another horror film. After reading the script, however, she was immediately attracted to the character and the acting challenges it presented.

=== Filming ===
Principal photography began in November 2004 on location in the Watershed area about 25 mi (40 km) east of Vancouver, British Columbia, around Buntzen Lake. Four separate caves were used, including an old copper mine. The 26 ft (7.9 m) ranger station tower was constructed in two pieces. A few shots show the tower assembled. Most of the interior shots of the top half of the tower were filmed while that piece was on the ground.

== Release ==
=== Home media ===
It Waits was released on DVD by Anchor Bay on May 23, 2006. Anchor Bay/Starz later re-released the film on Blu-ray on May 25, 2010.

=== Critical response ===
It Waits received generally negative reviews. In ReelFilm Reviews, David Nusair gave the film two out of four stars, commending Vincent's performance, and action sequences. However, Nusair criticized the film's melodramatic aspects and slow pacing. Nusair concludes, "While it's certainly better than the majority of its straight-to-video horror brethren, It Waits is ultimately bogged down by a melodramatic opening half-hour and an overall feeling of tediousness." Robert Pardi from TV Guide gave the film one out of four stars, calling it "a standard-issue rustic splatter film". Pardi notes that the screenwriters "waste a lot of time developing Danny's back story" and director Steven R. Monroe "piles on the gore"—the result is "repetitive, silly and more than a little gross". HorrorNews.net gave the film a negative review, stating that the film felt drawn out, criticizing the film's pacing, performances, and the monster's lack of screen time. Bill Gibron from DVD Talk gave the film two and a half out of five stars, calling it "pretentious", and panned the film's "barely coherent" acting, direction, and narrative inconsistencies.

Steve Barton from Dread Central rated the film a score of three out of five, commending the film's direction, writing, performances, while also stating that occasional scenes came off as "whiney and unnecessary".
