= Offing David =

2008 film

- Directed by: Jeff Bays
- Written by: Craig Moore
- Starring: Richie Harkham; Adam J. Yeend; Asha Kuerten
- Music by: Joao Camacho
- Production companies: Hark Angel; Borgus Productions
- Release date: 2008
- Country: Australia

Offing David is a 2008 Australian crime/mystery film. It was directed by Jeff Bays, and was filmed in Sydney, New South Wales in 2007. It was one of the first on-screen roles for Australian actors Nathaniel Buzolic and Adam J. Yeend.

== Plot ==
Two mates (Richie Harkham and Adam J. Yeend) get into more than they can handle when a plan to off popular jock David (Nathaniel Buzolic) goes wrong.

== Cast ==
- Richie Harkham as Adam
- Adam J. Yeend as Matt
- Brendan Clearkin as Richard Clarke
- Asha Kuerten as Sarah
- Nathaniel Buzolic as David
- Sascha Raeburn as Jane
- Russell Jeffrey as Kevin
- Thomas Bromhead as Tennis Announcer

== Reception ==
A review on Filmberg.com wrote: "It’s always good to see an Australian film made with an obvious love of cinema history and which it’s clear the actors had a fun time making it and while the story does proceed with a degree of suspense, the film’s painfully low budget and independent roots are very visible." ScaredStiff Reviews stated: "Overall a well made suspense/dark comedy that is fun to watch and keeps you searching for the Hitchcock moments. I also want to note that the music by Joao Camacho was impressive and really added an air of mystery and suspense throughout the film. I wasn’t expecting that in a low budget film."
