= Nikki Muller =

Singaporean actress (born 1985)

Nikki Muller is a Philippines-born Singaporean actress, television presenter and speaker.

== Early life ==
She was born in 1985 to a Swiss father and a Filipino mother.

== Career ==
Her television career started in 2000 while in high school. She received an invitation from an MTV Asia film crew to record an item regarding the film Men in Black; shortly after that, she auditioned for MTV@MBassy, shot in the Philippines, but shown across Southeast Asia. She halted her career in 2001 to prevent interference with her grades. In 2003, she presented Studio Disney on the regional version of Disney Channel for two years. After graduating from college, she worked at United Nations Headquarters in New York.

In 2011, she returned to television in Singapore, appearing on Channel 5's sitcom Payday. She portrayed Carmelita, a Pinoy activist. In 2013, she presented Fox Sports Central on Fox Sports Asia and The Food Detectives (The Food Files outside Singapore) on Channel 5, the latter of which was renewed for a second season and began shooting in June 2014.

She appeared on an episode of the third series of Westworld, released in 2020.

== Personal life ==
She was raised as a third culture kid in the Philippines, before moving to the United Kingdom. She adopted a semi-nomadic lifestyle.
