= A Boy Called Po =

- Film poster
- Directed by: John Asher
- Screenplay by: Colin Goldman
- Produced by: John Asher; Rod Hamilton
- Starring: Christopher Gorham; Julian Feder; Kaitlin Doubleday
- Cinematography: Steven Douglas Smith
- Edited by: John Asher
- Music by: Burt Bacharach
- Production companies: Commonwealth Film Manufacturing; New Coast Productions
- Release date: April 23, 2016 (Newport Beach International Film Festival)
- Running time: 95 minutes
- Country: United States
- Language: English

A Boy Called Po (also known as Po) is a 2016 American drama film directed by John Asher and written by Colin Goldman, based on a true story starring Christopher Gorham, Julian Feder, and Kaitlin Doubleday. When his wife dies of cancer, an overworked engineer struggles to care for his autistic son. In response to bullying, the young boy regresses into a fantasy world escape. The score for the film was composed by Burt Bacharach.

== Cast ==
- Christopher Gorham as David Wilson
- Julian Feder as Po
- Kaitlin Doubleday as Amy
- Andrew Bowen as Jack
- Sean Gunn as Ben
- Caitlin Carmichael as Amelia Carr
- Bryan Batt as Randall Bane
- Fay Masterson as Valerie
- Brian George as Bill
- Tristan Chase as Taylor Martz

== Reception ==
RogerEbert.com states: "The intentions behind "A Boy Called Po" are not only good, but honorable." Dove.org considers: "Po is an inspiring story about a committed father, David Wilson (Christopher Gorham), and his love and concern for his autistic son, Patrick, fondly called “Po”." Movieguide.org states: "A Boy Called Po is an engaging, low budget movie with a strong, powerful climax. There are a few endings after the climax, but they each resolve several important issues. The heart of this movie is the relationship between the father and his son."

== Awards ==
In 2016, the film won the Gold Remi Award at Worldfest Houston, the Festival Award for Breakthrough Feature at the San Diego International Film Festival, Best Feature at the Palm Beach International Film Festival, Outstanding Achievement in Filmmaking, Music, at the Newport Beach Film Festival, Best Actor (Julian Feder) at the Albuquerque Film & Music Experience, Best Actor (Julian Feder) at the Young Artists Awards as well as being nominated for many other accolades.
