= Murder-Set-Pieces =

2004 American horror film

- Theatrical Release Poster
- Directed by: Nick Palumbo
- Written by: Nick Palumbo
- Produced by: Nick Palumbo
- Starring: Sven Garrett; Gunnar Hansen; Cerina Vincent; Tony Todd
- Cinematography: Brendan Flynt
- Edited by: Todd C. Ramsay
- Music by: The Bronx Casket Co.; Eric Galligan; The Giallos Flame; Necrophagia; Zombi
- Production company: Fright Flix Productions
- Distributed by: Blackwatch Releasing
- Release dates: December 4, 2004 (Sitges Film Festival); December 24, 2004
- Running time: Theatrical cut: 105 minutes; Director's Cut: 91 minutes; Edited cut: 83 minutes
- Country: United States
- Languages: English; German
- Budget: $2 million

Murder-Set-Pieces is a 2004 American psychological slasher film produced, and directed by Nick Palumbo. The film stars Sven Garrett as a psychopathic photographer and serial killer who rapes, tortures and murders prostitutes. The film features cameos from horror icons Gunnar Hansen (The Texas Chain Saw Massacre), Cerina Vincent (Cabin Fever), and Tony Todd (Candyman).

The film drew controversy for its extreme violence, which led to a ban on its DVD release in the United Kingdom.

== Plot ==
The film follows a wealthy immigrant serial killer: a German photographer, who leads a double life: by day he shoots erotic photos. By night, he rapes, tortures, and murders prostitutes.

== Cast ==
- Sven Garrett as The Photographer
- Gunnar Hansen as The Nazi Mechanic
- Cerina Vincent as Beautiful Girl
- Tony Todd as Clerk
- Jade Risser as Jade
- Edwin Neal as Good Samaritan

Additionally, pornographic actress Crissy Moran appears as Tree Girl #1.

== Censorship ==
In comparison with the theatrical cut of the film, the 'R' rated DVD version was missing approximately 22 minutes. Most of the cuts were to obtain the 'R' rating and removed several intense scenes of sexualized violence and torture, however, some scenes were also removed by the director himself which he intended to edit out of the film before going into theaters but never got the chance.

The British Board of Film Classification refused to give a certificate to the film, making its release in the UK illegal. It cited "unacceptable scenes" of "sex or sexual behaviour accompanied by non-consensual pain, injury and humiliation", with particular concern that "young children are among those terrorised and killed". While the Board considered whether the issue could be dealt with through cuts, it felt that unacceptable content featured throughout, and since what remained was essentially preparatory and set-up material for the unacceptable scenes, cuts were an unviable option and the film was therefore refused a classification.

=== Critical reception ===
The film received generally negative reviews. Rotten Tomatoes reports that 36% of 11 reviews were positive, with an average rating of 3.73/10. On Metacritic, the film has a 13 out of 100 rating, based on 5 critics, signifying "overwhelming dislike".

Debra Birnbaum of the New York Post wrote it "aspires to be a highly stylized exploration of the mind of a serial killer, but it's nothing more than a gory, blood-soaked snuff film [sic], reveling in its own shock value."

Dennis Harvey of Variety said the film evinced "only the slightest interest in narrative or character", and "distinguishes itself via sheer extremity of gore, sadism and tastelessness", and that its "nastiness is so insistent, one-dimensional and excessive it risks self-parody".

Ben Kenigsberg of The Village Voice called it "a movie so utterly degenerate it makes you wish that indie filmmakers had to prove a basic standard of decency in order to buy a camera."

However, Heidi Martinuzzi of Film Threat gave it four stars out of four, calling it "incredibly good" and "well made".

=== Home media ===
A director's cut DVD was released after its theatrical run. The theatrical version runs at 105 minutes, the uncut DVD version runs at 91 minutes, whereas the 'R' rated version runs at 83 minutes.

Later, the film was released on limited edition 4K remastered Blu-ray, with the disc including both the uncut theatrical version and the director's cut in HD for the first time, along with an HDR director-approved color grade.
