= Cerina Vincent =

American actress (born 1979)

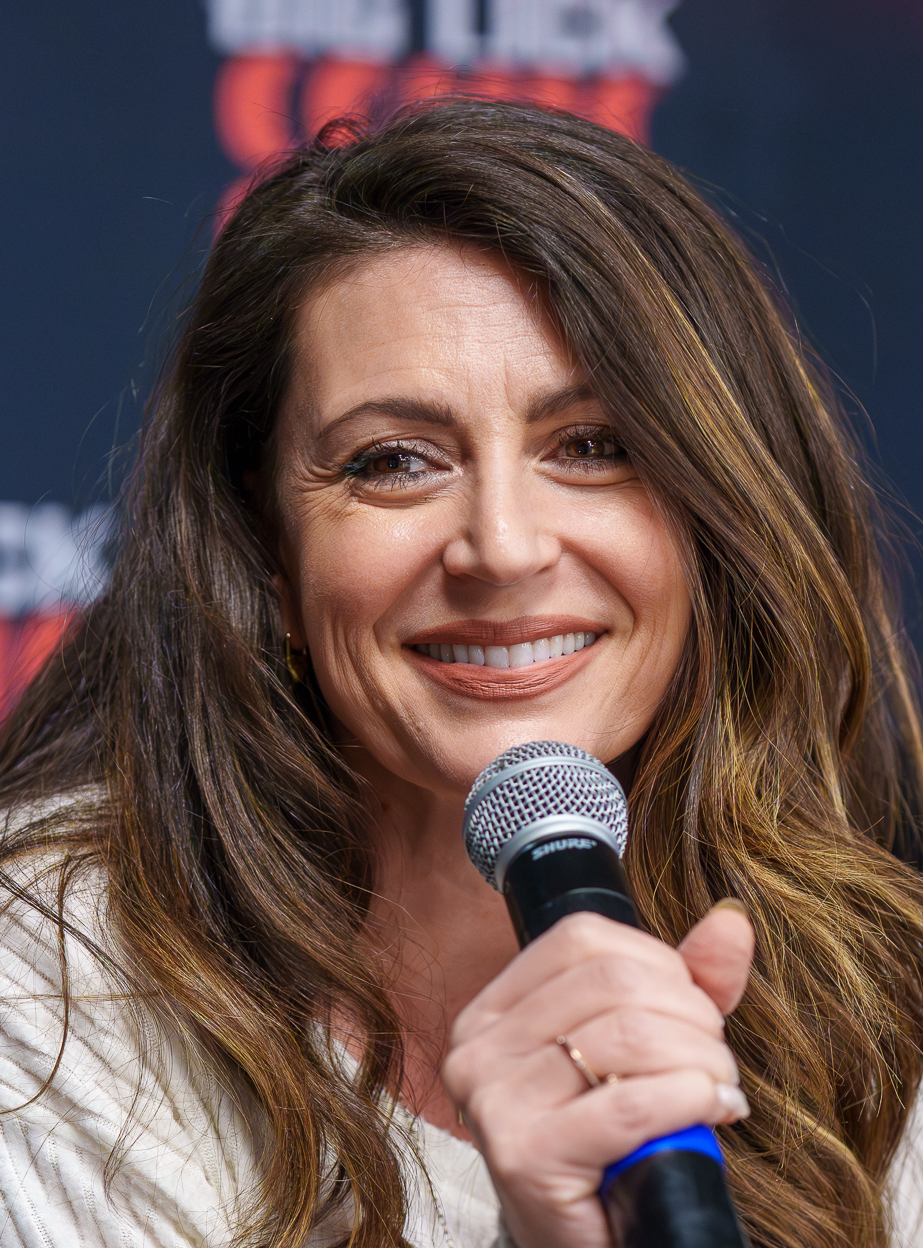
- Vincent at Big Lick Comic Con in Roanoke, Virginia in 2026
- Born: February 7, 1979 (age 47); Las Vegas, Nevada, U.S.
- Education: Durango High School
- Alma mater: Loyola Marymount University
- Occupations: Actress; writer
- Years active: 1998–present
- Known for: Power Rangers Lost Galaxy; Cabin Fever; Not Another Teen Movie
- Title: Miss Nevada Teen USA 1996
- Spouses: Ben Waller (m. 2008; div. 2013); Mike Estes (m. 2022)
- Children: 1
- Website: cerinavincent.net

Cerina Vincent (born February 7, 1979) is an American actress and author. She had her breakthrough role starring as Maya in the television series Power Rangers Lost Galaxy, followed by a part in the comedy film Not Another Teen Movie, before going on to star in the horror film Cabin Fever, which established her as a "scream queen" and led to further roles in horror movies. More recently, she appeared as Suzy Diaz in the Disney Channel series Stuck in the Middle. She has also written three books with Jodi Lipper, wrote a regular column for The Huffington Post, and co-hosts the podcast Raising Amazing with Dr. Joel Gator.

== Early life ==
Vincent was born on February 7, 1979, in Las Vegas, Nevada, to parents of Italian descent. Vincent loved to perform from an early age, encouraged by her mother, who was a dance instructor. She performed in a Christmas production at Diskin Elementary School, learning the lines for all the characters. She also appeared in productions at the Rainbow Company Youth Theater, which was sponsored by the Cultural Affairs division of Las Vegas. In 1996, at the age of sixteen, Vincent won the Miss Nevada Teen USA title and competed at Miss Teen USA. Though she made it to the top 15, she failed to place at the pageant (televised live), which was held in Las Cruces, New Mexico.

Vincent graduated from Durango High School in 1997, and moved to Los Angeles, where she attended Marymount College also known as Loyola Marymount University on a scholarship. Between classes, she went on auditions and eventually landed several commercials and a role on USA High for the USA Network.

== Career ==
=== 1990s ===
In 1999, Vincent made her film debut in the direct-to-video thriller Fear Runs Silent, starring Billy Dee Williams. Her first significant role as an actress, however, was as the Yellow Galaxy Ranger, Maya, in the television series Power Rangers Lost Galaxy, the seventh season of the program's franchise that aired from February 6, 1999, to December 18, 1999. Vincent later recalled, "It was a great way to learn a lot and get a taste for this business on a small show like that, but for kids. It was cool to be a role model for kids."

Following the success of Power Rangers Lost Galaxy, Vincent appeared on MTV's Undressed, Son of the Beach, Malcolm in the Middle, Felicity and Ally McBeal. She also returned as Maya in the two-part Power Rangers Lightspeed Rescue episode, “Trakeena’s Revenge”, which saw the two teams of Rangers team up.

=== 2000s ===
In 2001, Vincent landed her first role in a major motion picture, spoof film Not Another Teen Movie, playing foreign exchange student Areola. The part notably required her to be nude whenever she appeared throughout the movie: as a satirical take on the gratuitous nudity that was prevalent in teen films of the time, and specifically as a parody of Shannon Elizabeth's character Nadia in American Pie, the character never wears clothes, even in public. Vincent is naked in all of her scenes, with her body serving as a sight gag of sorts: subtitles for her ever-changing accent are spaced to avoid obscuring her breasts, as she interacts with fully clothed characters, all of whom either don't notice or don't comment on her out-of-place nudity.

Vincent described taking the part as a "huge decision" for her, having never previously done any nude scenes. She initially turned down the role several times, ultimately deciding to do it because she thought it was funny; however, she still had reservations about performing in the nude for the first time and so extensively. In a 2011 interview, Vincent explained:

In that moment I was more concerned... oh my God, am I going to be... personally... can I do this? To be nude and have it be out there forever for people to see - and I wanted to make sure my family didn't disown me. [...] It's weird, it's hard because your body is your body and it's personal. It's easier to shoot that scene because everyone was professional and my character was ridiculous—I did many different accents in the movie, and it was funny... it was a comedy. So, shooting the scenes was the easy part—with it being out there forever and ever and ever... that's more of a mental... it screws with your head a little bit and you question your decisions, but I don't have any regrets.

Vincent appeared in the 2020 documentary Skin: A History of Nudity in the Movies in a segment discussing the role.

In 2003, Vincent starred in the R-rated horror film Cabin Fever, which featured some of her most memorable film moments, including her "leg-shaving" scene and the "plane-crash" seduction and sex scene. The film included topless scenes and two sex scenes with two different characters. Fearing that she would be typecast into nude roles, Vincent was cautious about over-exposing herself in the film, which became a point of contention between her and director Eli Roth.

Starting in 2004, Vincent appeared in a series of theatrical and television films, including Murder-Set-Pieces (2004) as the L.A. Girl, Intermedio (2005) as Gen, and Conversations with Other Women (2005) as Sarah the Dancer. In 2005, she appeared in her first starring role in the film It Waits (2005) as forest ranger Danielle "Danny" St. Claire. Vincent made several television appearances beginning in 2005, with appearances on CSI: Crime Scene Investigation, Palmetto Pointe and Sex, Love & Secrets. Since then, she has also worked on the series Bones, Two and a Half Men, Gary Unmarried, Zombie Family, Mike & Molly, and The Walking Dead. In 2006, she appeared in The Surfer King as Tiffany, Seven Mummies as Lacy, and the Sci-Fi Channel original movie Sasquatch Mountain as Erin Price, alongside Lance Henriksen. In 2007, she appeared in the television films Manchild and Wifey, as well as Return to House on Haunted Hill as Michelle, and Everybody Wants to Be Italian as Marisa Costa. In 2008, she appeared in Toxic as Malvi, the independent film, Just Add Water as The Mrs., and in Fashion Victim.

=== 2010s ===
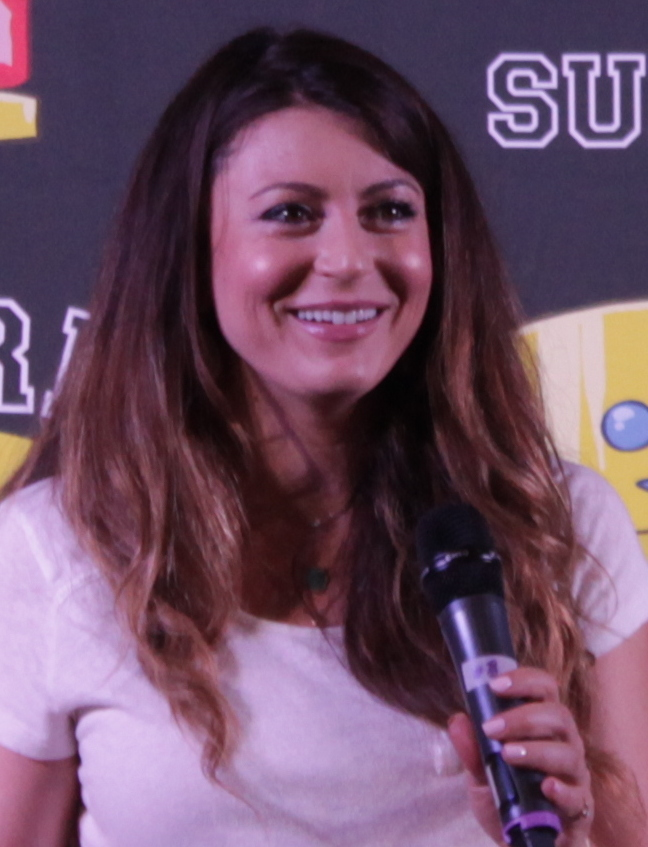
Vincent at the Florida Supercon in 2015

Vincent returned to films in 2012, appearing in Complacent as Myah Sanderson and Chasing Happiness as Andrea, and playing the title role in MoniKa, for which she was also the executive producer. In 2013, Vincent appeared in the Hallmark Channel original movie The Thanksgiving House in the role of Ashleigh, and produced and starred in the acclaimed horror short Skypemare, which also starred Annika Marks and featured Ryan Dillon and Adam J. Yeend; the film screened at Telluride Horror Show and ScreamFest 2013 in Los Angeles. In 2017, Vincent had a small role in the indie movie Broken Memories.

From 2016 to 2018, Vincent played Suzy Diaz, mother to seven children, on the Disney Channel series Stuck in the Middle. The series ran for three seasons.

Vincent's most recent performances include the lead role of Jen in the 2018 feature film thriller The Work Wife, a 2019 guest starring appearance on NCIS: Los Angeles, and a part in the 2020 Lifetime TV movie My Daughter's Psycho Friend.

== Personal life ==
In November 2018, Vincent announced her pregnancy with her first child, a boy with her longtime partner Mike Estes. Her son was born in February 2019.

== Filmography ==
=== Film ===
Year	Title	Role	Notes
1999	Power Rangers Lost Galaxy: Return of the Magna Defender	Maya/Yellow Galaxy Ranger	Video
2000	Fear Runs Silent	June	Video
2001	Not Another Teen Movie	Areola	
2002	Darkened Room	Girl #2	Short
2002	Cabin Fever	Marcy	
2004	Murder-Set-Pieces	L.A. Girl	
2004	Final Sale	Cerina	Short
2005	Intermedio	Gen	
2005	Conversations with Other Women	Sarah the Dancer	
2005	It Waits	Danielle "Danny" St. Claire	
2006	7 Mummies	Lacy	
2006	Sasquatch Mountain	Erin Price	
2006	Pennies	Kimberly	Short
2006	The Surfer King	Tiffany	
2007	Everybody Wants to Be Italian	Marisa Costa	
2007	Return to House on Haunted Hill	Michelle	Video
2008	Just Add Water	The Mrs.	
2008	Fashion Victim	TV Reporter	
2008	Toxic	Malvi	
2010	Love & Distrust	Kimberly	Video
2010	The United Monster Talent Agency	Kay	Short
2012	Complacent	Myah Sanderson	
2012	Chasing Happiness	Andrea	
2012	MoniKa	Monika	
2013	The Thanksgiving House	Ashleigh	TV movie
2013	Skypemare	Alison	Short
2015	Tag	Christine	
2015	Tales of Halloween	Ellena Bishop	
2015	Freaks of Nature	Daisy	
2017	Broken Memories	Sara	
2019	The Work Wife	Jen	
2020	My Daughter's Psycho Friend	Melissa	TV movie
2020	Killing Eleanor	Laurie	
2021	Secrets in the Water	Laura	TV movie
2022	Dixon Mason: The Scent of the Woman	Rita Munroe (voice)	Short
2023	That's a Wrap	Alexis	
2023	The Next Big Hit	Sarah	
2026	Legend of the White Dragon	Rebecca Reed	
2026	Ernie and Emma	Judy	

=== Television ===
Year	Title	Role	Notes
1998	USA High	Babe	Episode: "Goodbye Christian"
1999	Power Rangers Lost Galaxy	Maya/Yellow Galaxy Ranger	Main Cast
2000	Undressed	Kitty	Recurring Cast: Season 2
2000	Power Rangers Lightspeed Rescue	Maya/Yellow Galaxy Ranger	Episode: "Trakeena's Revenge: Part 1 & 2"
2000	Son of the Beach	Sorority Girl	Episode: "Silence of the Clams"
2001	City Guys	Nicole	Episode: "Blast from the Past"
2001	Malcolm in the Middle	Carly	Episode: "Malcolm vs. Reese"
2001	Dead Last	Cindy	Episode: "Gastric Distress"
2001	Felicity	Denise Jensen	Episode: “Miss Conception”
2002	Ally McBeal	Penny	Episode: “Another One Bites the Dust”
2002	Son of the Beach	Mandy	Episode: "Witness for the Prostitution"
2005	CSI: Crime Scene Investigation	Gwen	Episode: "4x4"
2005	Palmetto Pointe	Girl	Episode: "Hello, Goodbye"
2005	Sex, Love & Secrets	Party Girl	Episode: "Molting"
2006	Bones	Denise	Episode: “The Girl in Suite 2103”
2008	Two and a Half Men	LuLu	Episode: “A Little Clammy and None too Fresh”
2009	Gary Unmarried	Miss James	Episode: “Gary Dates Louise’s Teacher”
2012	Mike & Molly	Desri	Episode: “The Dress”
2012	The Walking Dead: Cold Storage	Kelly	Episode: “Cold Storage: Parting Shots”
2012	Zombie Family	Cindy Apple	Episode: "Death Of a Salesman"
2014	Workaholics	Laura	Recurring Cast: Season 4
2014	Californication	Lisa	Episode: "Daughter"
2014	Jennifer Falls	Caroline	Episode: “Staycation”
2015	Hollywood Hitmen	Allison	Episode: “The Office”
2015	Stay Filthy, Cali	Girlfriend	Main Cast
2016–18	Stuck In The Middle	Suzy Diaz	Main Cast
2017	Scary Endings	Becky (voice)	Episode: “The Water Rises”
2017	The Reflex Experience	Carmen	Main Cast
2019	NCIS: Los Angeles	Lucy Garcia	Episode: “Provenance”

=== Documentary ===
Year	Title
2020	Skin: A History of Nudity in the Movies

== Books ==
Vincent and her co-writer Jodi Lipper wrote a regular column for HuffPost from 2007 to 2016. The pair have also authored three publication books:

- How to Eat Like a Hot Chick. New York: HarperCollins. 2008. ISBN 9780061560866.
- How to Love Like a Hot Chick. New York: HarperCollins. 2009. ISBN 9780061706448.
- Live Like a Hot Chick. New York: HarperCollins. 2010. ISBN 9780061959073.

Preceded by Alicia Carnes	Miss Nevada Teen USA; 1996	Succeeded by Kaci Thompson
