= Nathaniel Buzolic =

Australian actor (born 1983)

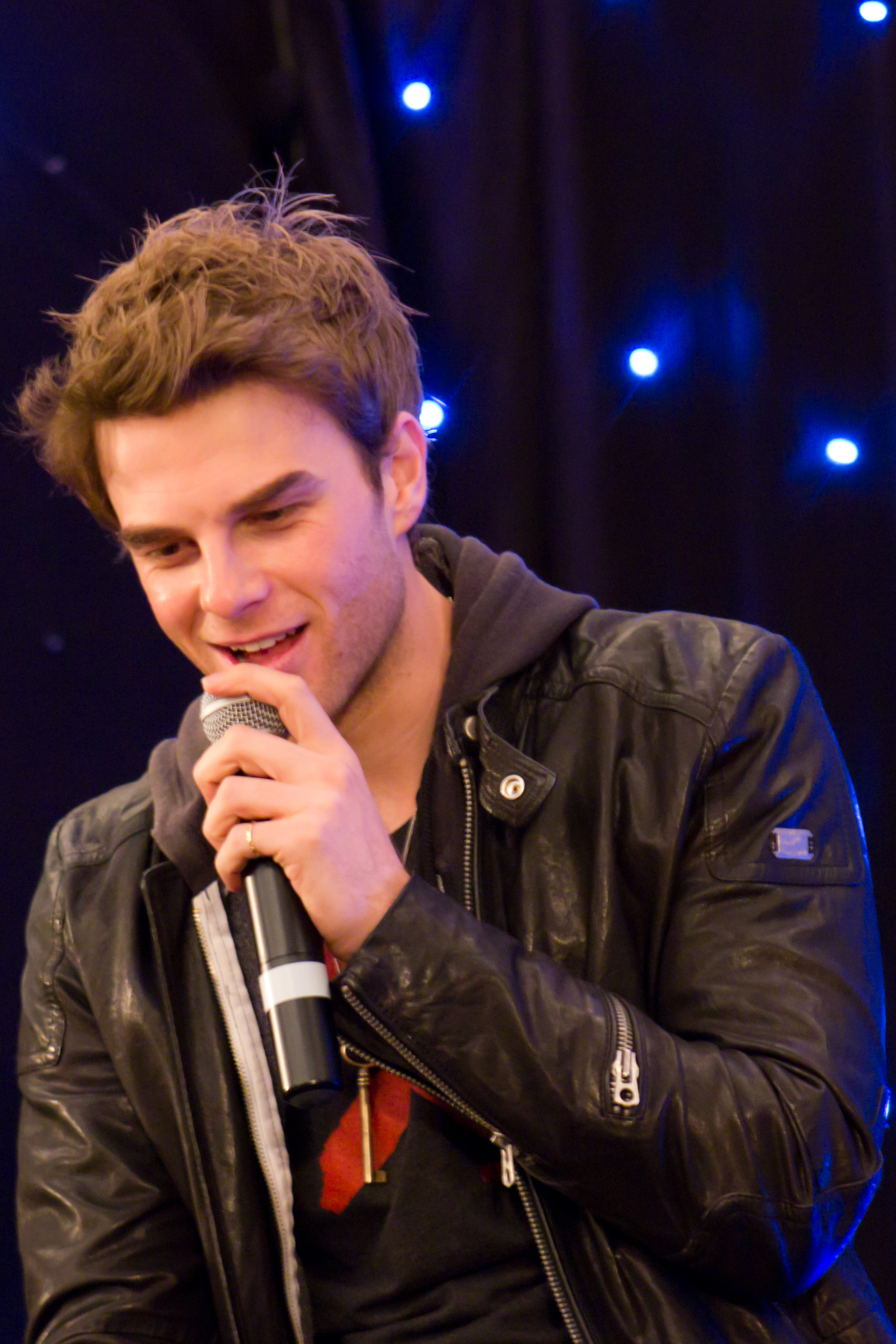
- Buzolic in June 2013
- Other name: Nate Buzz
- Education: Screenwise; University of Western Sydney
- Occupation: Actor
- Years active: 2001–present

Nathaniel Buzolic (/bəˈzɒlɪtʃ/ bə-ZOL-ich) (born 4 August 1983) is an Australian actor. He was the host of Nine Network's late-night television quiz show The Mint, and had a regular role on the BBC soap opera Out of the Blue (2008). He was also a co-host of the educational show Weather Ed on Sky News Weather Channel. He is also known for his role as Kol Mikaelson on the CW show The Vampire Diaries and its spin-off The Originals.

== Early life ==
Buzolic is a first-generation Australian, and is of Croatian descent. His mother was born in a refugee camp in Egypt and grew up in Lakemba, New South Wales. Buzolic studied at De La Salle College Ashfield, and later attended the Australian Theatre for Young People (ATYP) in Sydney and later studied at Screenwise Acting School for Film and Television, graduating in 2004.

== Career ==
Buzolic hosted the Disney Channel's afternoon kids show Studio Disney (2005). He has also appeared in All Saints (2003), Home and Away (2002) and an uncredited role in an episode of Water Rats (2001).

Buzolic's played the title role in the feature comedy Offing David (2008) alongside fellow Australian actor Adam J. Yeend. Previously, he had minor roles in the 2007 Australian short films Road Rage and My Greatest Day Ever.

In 2011, it was confirmed that Buzolic would play Kol Mikaelson in the CW series The Vampire Diaries. He reprised his role in the pilot episode of The Vampire Diaries spin-off series The Originals. It was reported on 30 May 2014 that Buzolic would return to The Originals for its second season and he appeared in the first trailer that debuted at the 2014 San Diego Comic-Con.

On 20 February 2014, it was announced that Buzolic had landed one of the lead roles in Supernatural: Bloodlines, a spin-off of the CW series Supernatural, with the twentieth episode of the latter's ninth season serving as a backdoor pilot. However, The CW passed on the pilot in May 2014. In March 2014, Buzolic appeared in two episodes of the fourth season of ABC Family's Pretty Little Liars as Dean Stavros, Spencer's (Troian Bellisario) substance abuse counselor. He reprised his role in the fifth and sixth episodes of the sixth season. Buzolic appeared in 2016 Mel Gibson war film Hacksaw Ridge as Harold Doss, the brother of the main character, alongside Andrew Garfield. In March 2022, it was announced that he would appear in Legacies as Kol Mikaelson.

In May 2026 he began appearing in the Israeli version of Dancing with the Stars. He was eliminated in the July 25, 2026 episode.

== Personal life ==
Buzolic is a Born-again Christian.

He has voiced support for Israel during the Gaza war and has visited the country more than 25 times since 2017. In October 2023, in solidarity with Israel, Buzolic condemned the October 7 attacks, calling the pro-Palestine movement as "satanic" and stated that people who support the Palestinians as "the devil". In an interview with Sky News Australia in January 2024, he called the pro-Palestinian slogan "from the river to the sea" as a "call for genocide of the Jewish presence in the land". In 2024 Buzolic was honored as one of the torchbearers in the national Israeli Independence Day ceremony.

In 2026, Buzolic took to social media to decry “the jihadist, camel-abusing, keffiyeh culture of the Arab Palestinians,” comments which drew fire from mainstream media sources.

== Filmography ==
=== Film ===
Year	Title	Role	Notes
2005	Dirty Deeds	—N/a	Uncredited role
2007	Road Rage	Young driver	Short film
2007	My Greatest Day Ever	Coach	Short film
2008	Offing David	David	Feature Film
2009	Multiple Choice	Tommy	Short film
2010	Needle	Ryan	
2016	Hacksaw Ridge	Harold "Hal" Doss	
2019	Saving Zoë	Jason	
2020	Deep Blue Sea 3	Richard	
2025	Mob Cops	Jesse Polino	

=== Television ===
Year	Title	Role	Notes
2001	Water Rats	—N/a	Uncredited; unknown episodes
2002	Home and Away	Paul Chalmers	1 episode
2003	All Saints	Damon Lloyd	Episode: "Friends in Need"
2005	Studio Disney	Himself	Host
2007	The Mint	Himself	Host
2008	Out of the Blue	Paul O'Donnell	Main role (50 episodes)
2010	Cops L.A.C.	Jahrryde	Episode: "A Veil of Tears"
2011	Crownies	Jesse Major	1 episode
2012–14	The Vampire Diaries	Kol Mikaelson	Recurring role (season 3-4); Guest role (season 5); 10 episodes
2013–18	The Originals	Kol Mikaelson	Guest role (season 1); Recurring role (Season 2–5); 24 episodes
2014–15	Pretty Little Liars	Dean Stavros	Recurring role (4 episodes)
2014	Supernatural	David Lassiter	Episode: "Bloodlines" (backdoor pilot for Supernatural: Bloodlines)
2015	Bones	Hunter Ellis	Episode: "The Teacher in the Books"
2015	Significant Mother	Jimmy Barnes	Main role (9 episodes)
2022	Legacies	Kol Mikaelson	Special guest star
2026	Rokdim Im Kokhavim	Himself	Contestant (Season 12)

=== Web ===
Year	Title	Role	Notes
2014	The Originals: The Awakening	Kol Mikaelson	4 episodes
