= Lust for Love (2014 film) =

2014 independent romantic comedy film

- Theatrical release poster
- Directed by: Anton King
- Written by: Anton King
- Produced by: Anton King; Dichen Lachman; Jack Wylson; Adam J. Yeend
- Starring: Fran Kranz; Dichen Lachman; Beau Garrett; Caitlin Stasey; Enver Gjokaj; Karim Saleh; Miracle Laurie; Felicia Day; Maurissa Tancharoen
- Cinematography: Adam Bricker
- Edited by: Anton King
- Music by: Jed Whedon
- Production companies: AGGK Films; Luna Pictures Entertainment; Singhi
- Distributed by: Gravitas Ventures
- Release date: February 7, 2014
- Running time: 90 minutes
- Country: United States
- Language: English

Lust for Love is a 2014 independent romantic comedy film written and directed by Anton King. The narrative follows the story of Astor (Fran Kranz) as he attempts to win back his childhood dream-girl Mila (Beau Garrett) after a short courtship precipitated by a drunken rescue by seeking the advice of her former best friend Cali (Dichen Lachman).

== Plot ==
Astor, a zoology major, has dreamed of being with Mila since childhood. One night, after drunken revelry on his birthday, he brings her home to care for her. One thing leads to another, and a brief awkward courtship begins. Having idolized her for so long, and being an incurable romantic, the courtship ends as abruptly as it begins. Still obsessed with Mila, he turns to her close friend Cali, recently un-friended for reasons unknown for advice, tips, pointers, and direction. This leads him in unexpected directions.

== Cast ==
Lust for Love features, along with a few other actors, a host of alumni from Joss Whedon's TV series Dollhouse.

- Fran Kranz as Astor
- Dichen Lachman as Cali
- Beau Garrett as Mila
- Caitlin Stasey as Trinity/Divinity
- Enver Gjokaj as Jake
- Karim Saleh as Franck
- Miracle Laurie as Jenny
- Felicia Day as Mary
- Maurissa Tancharoen as Hazel
- Sharon Wyse as Astor's mom

== Production ==
In order to produce the film, the creative team turned to crowd-sourced funding via Kickstarter. The funding period ran from 12 October 2011 to 10 November 2011 with a goal of $70,000. Ultimately $101,030 was pledged by Kickstarter backers. The crowd-sourced funds were depleted just before the end of principal photography, and the production team made up the deficit.

Principal photography ran for 19 days in December 2011 with shooting locations in the Los Angeles area. Post-production began in January 2012 using Final Cut Pro on the Apple Macintosh platform. First assembly was complete in April 2012, and the first rough cut screening by the team was done in May 2012. Additional cuts took place during the summer of 2012, with sound mixing and final editing taking place through the year. Post-production was completed in April 2013. The cast and crew screening for distributors took place on 18 June 2013. By November 2013, a distributor had taken on the film, but remained in stealth mode.

Writer/Director Anton King had made a short film entitled "Lust for Love" which played at the Melbourne Underground Film Festival. Being fond of the title, he decided to re-use it for his first feature film.

On 22 January 2014 it was announced that Gravitas Ventures would release the film via video on demand with a release date of 7 February 2014. The film would be available via iTunes, Amazon Video, Google Play, Vudu, and other online channels.

== Release ==
The premiere screening with Q&A and reception was held on 1 February 2014 at the Harmony Gold Theatre as part of the run-up to the general release.

The film reached #61 on the iTunes movie list within hours of its release. On 10 February, the film reached number 5 on the iTunes movie list of independent movies.
