= Dichen Lachman =

Australian actress and model (born 1982)

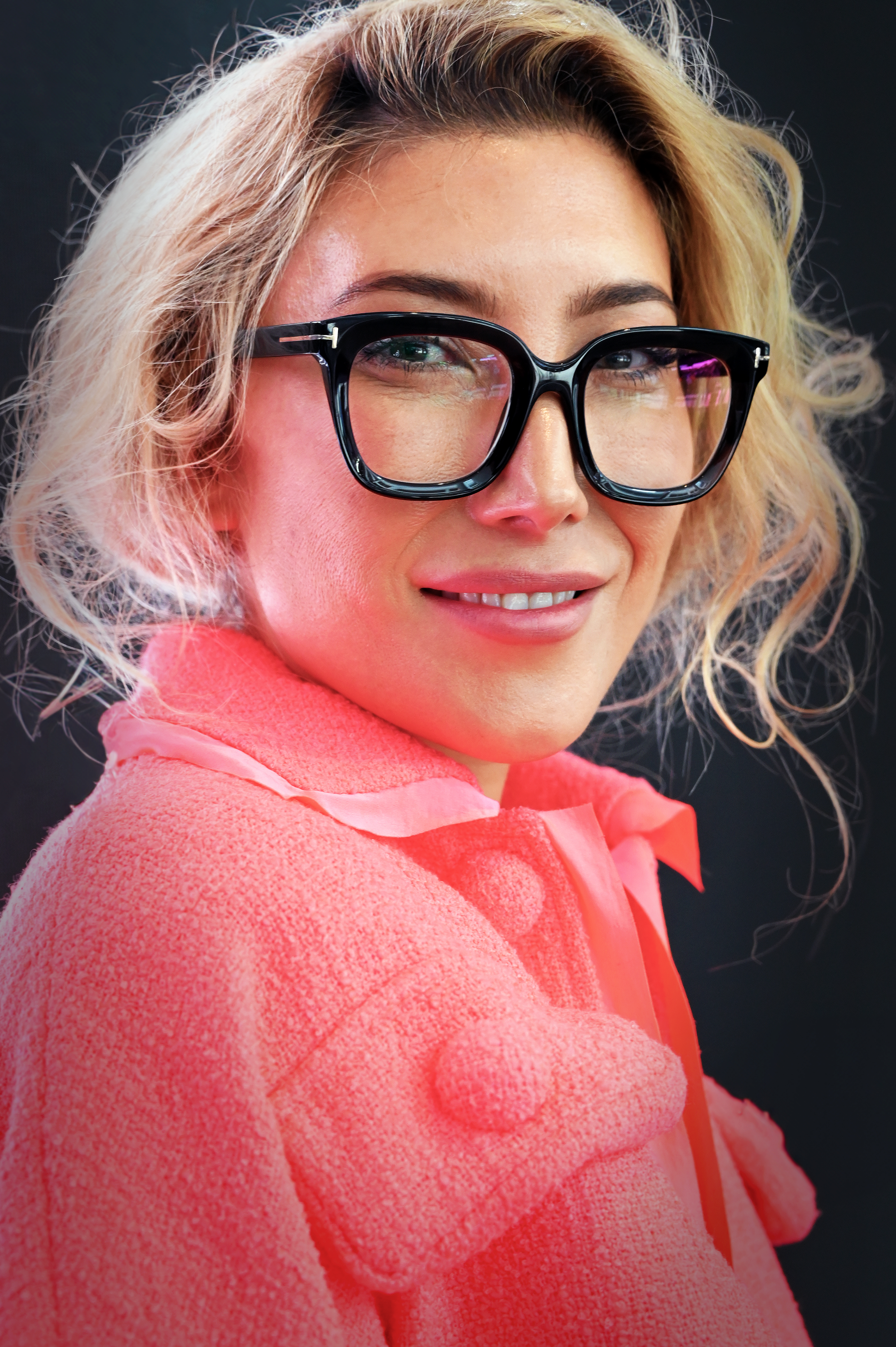
- Lachman in 2025
- Born: February 22, 1982 (age 44); Kathmandu, Nepal
- Education: University of Adelaide
- Occupations: Actress, model
- Years active: 2005–present
- Spouse: Maximilian Osinski (m. 2015)
- Children: 1

Dichen Lachman (/ˈdiːtʃən ˈlækmən/ DEE-chən LAK-mən;) (born 22 February 1982) is a Nepali-born Australian actress and model. She is best known for her roles as Katya Kinski in the soap opera Neighbours (2005–2007), Sierra in Joss Whedon's science fiction drama series Dollhouse (2009–2010), and Ms. Casey in Severance (2022–present).

Lachman has starred in numerous television series, including Being Human (2012), Last Resort (2012–2013), Altered Carbon (2018–2020), and starred as Jiaying in the superhero drama series Agents of S.H.I.E.L.D. (2014–2020).

Lachman has also appeared in numerous films, including Lust for Love (2014), Too Late (2015), Bad Therapy (2020), and Kingdom of the Planet of the Apes (2024). She also portrayed Soyona Santos in the Jurassic Park film Jurassic World Dominion (2022) and animated series Jurassic World: Chaos Theory (2024–2025).

== Early life and education ==
Dichen Lachman was born in Kathmandu, Nepal. She moved to Adelaide, Australia, in the early 1990s with her family. Her father is Australian and her mother is Tibetan.

She attended West Lakes Primary School, Gilles Street Primary School, Norwood Morialta High School, St Mary's College, Adelaide, Annesley College, and the University of Adelaide.

== Career ==
Lachman first filmed an ad in Australia for Wanadoo, which aired in the United Kingdom. In 2005, she joined the cast of the Australian soap opera Neighbours as Katya Kinski. She had auditioned for the role of Elle Robinson, but the producers decided to create the part of Katya for her.

Lachman played a small role in the feature film Aquamarine. After she finished shooting the role of Aaren in the film Bled, Lachman joined the cast of the film Aztec Rex in Hawaii. In an interview with The Soap Show, Lachman said she had appeared on the BBC television show Ready Steady Cook while visiting England in late 2006. In the interview, she explained that she was in Los Angeles to advance her acting career, but said she would love to work in the UK and Australia.

On 26 March 2008, it was announced that Lachman would portray Sierra in the television series Dollhouse, created by Joss Whedon.

In an interview with ScifiNow in 2009, Lachman responded to the rumour that she would star in an upcoming television show based on Star Wars by saying, "I am a huge George Lucas fan. I love those movies and it would be a dream come true—I'd love to do it, it would be incredible." She was named one of the 100 hottest women on screen for 2009, by the lesbian media site AfterEllen.com. "What a privilege to be there," she said.

She guest starred as an insurance agent/street racer on NCIS: Los Angeles. She also appeared as Amy Hanamoa, the widow of a murdered police officer, in an episode of Hawaii Five-0. Lachman made a guest appearance in an episode of the Doctor Who spin-off Torchwood, for its fourth series Torchwood: Miracle Day. Additionally, in 2011 it was announced in Variety that Lachman would be joining the cast of Being Human as a series regular.

In 2012, it was announced Lachman would be joining the Shawn Ryan–driven pilot Last Resort for ABC, and she subsequently appeared as a main character during the show's 13-episode run. She also guest starred in the second season of the Jane Espenson scripted web series, Husbands.

Between 2010 and 2013, while working on other productions, Lachman and her close friend Anton King produced Lust for Love. King wrote the script in 2010 and used Kickstarter to raise funds to make the movie. The initial goal was to raise US$70,000; however, when the deadline was reached on 11 November 2011 more than 1,500 people had pledged money, with a final figure of US$101,030. To complete the movie, additional funds were raised through friends and family. British filmmaker Jack Wylson came on board as a producer, Australian actor Adam J. Yeend as co-producer, and Adam Bricker as director of photography.

In 2014, Lachman began shooting in Canada, where she joined the cast of The 100 in the role of Anya and had a recurring role on ABC's Agents of S.H.I.E.L.D.

On 11 June 2015, a new movie called Too Late, starring Lachman, was released during the Los Angeles Film Festival. On 22 October 2015, it was announced that Lachman landed a recurring role on the third season of Michael Bay's action-adventure TNT series The Last Ship. Lachman had been cast as Jesse, a helicopter pilot who lives off-the-grid. She starred as Reileen Kawahara in Netflix's original television series, Altered Carbon, an adaptation of the 2002 novel of the same name by Richard K. Morgan. The first season was released on 2 February 2018. Also starting in 2018, Lachman began a recurring role as Frankie on Animal Kingdom during its third season.

In 2020, she returned for small story arcs on Agents of S.H.I.E.L.D. and Altered Carbon, and she also appeared in the film Bad Therapy. In 2022, Lachman joined the main cast of Severance, which premiered on Apple TV+. She appeared as Ms. Casey, a wellness counselor. The series received acclaim from critics and audiences, with Lachman being nominated for Best Supporting Actress in a Streaming Series, Drama at the 2nd Hollywood Critics Association TV Awards. Soon after she appeared as antagonist Soyona Santos in the 2022 film Jurassic World Dominion. Lachman was then announced as the titular character in Steven Brand's noir thriller Joe Baby. In 2024, she was announced to star in the dark thriller, Unholy Night, alongside Ed Speleers and Ed Westwick. She also reprised her role from Jurassic World Dominion in Jurassic World: Chaos Theory. In November 2025, it was revealed that Dichen Lachman joined the cast of The Legend of Zelda live-action film as Impa.

== Personal life ==
Lachman moved to Los Angeles shortly after she finished with the Australian TV drama Neighbours in 2007.

She married American actor Maximilian Osinski in January 2015, and gave birth to their daughter in May 2015.

== Filmography ==
=== Film ===
| Year | Title | Role | Notes |
|---|---|---|---|
| 2005 | Eastworld | Thug #4 | Short film |
| 2006 | Aquamarine | Beth-Ann | |
| 2006 | Safety in Numbers | News Reporter | |
| 2009 | Bled | Aaren | |
| 2010 | Sunday Punch | Jill | Short film |
| 2014 | Lust for Love | Cali | Also producer |
| 2015 | Too Late | Jilly Bean | |
| 2020 | Bad Therapy | Stern | |
| 2021 | Raya and the Last Dragon | General Atitaya / Spine Warrior | Voice |
| 2022 | Jurassic World Dominion | Soyona Santos | |
| 2024 | Joe Baby | Joe Baby | |
| 2024 | Kingdom of the Planet of the Apes | Korina | |
| 2024 | Aftermath | Doc | |
| 2024 | The Power Within | Areum | Short film |
| 2026 | Vampires of the Velvet Lounge | Cora | |
| 2026 | Other Mommy | Lois Anthony | |
| 2027 | The Legend of Zelda | Impa | Post-production |

=== Television ===
| Year | Title | Role | Notes |
|---|---|---|---|
| 2005–2007 | Neighbours | Katya Kinski | Main role; 103 episodes |
| 2008 | Aztec Rex | Ayacoatl | Television film |
| 2009–2010 | Dollhouse | Sierra / Priya Tsetsang | Main role; 27 episodes |
| 2010 | NCIS: Los Angeles | Allison Pritchett / Allysia Takada | Episode: "Full Throttle" |
| 2010 | Hawaii Five-0 | Amy Hanamoa | Episode: "Manaʻo" |
| 2011 | Torchwood: Miracle Day | Lyn Peterfield | Episode: "Rendition" |
| 2012 | Being Human | Suren | Main role (season 2); 7 episodes |
| 2012 | Don't Try This at Home | Jen | Episode: "Sex/Death, Part II" |
| 2012 | The Glades | Chef Lana Kim | Episode: "Food Fight" |
| 2012 | The League | Marbella | Episode: "12.12.12" |
| 2012–2013 | Last Resort | Tani Tumrenjack | Main role; 13 episodes |
| 2013 | CSI: Crime Scene Investigation | Jessica Lowell | Episode: "Fearless" |
| 2013 | King & Maxwell | Benny | 7 episodes |
| 2014 | The 100 | Anya | Recurring (seasons 1–2); 7 episodes |
| 2014–2015, 2020 | Agents of S.H.I.E.L.D. | Jiaying | Recurring (season 2); 9 episodes Guest (season 7); 2 episodes |
| 2014–2015 | Shameless | Angela | Guest (season 4); 1 episodes Recurring (season 5); 5 episodes |
| 2016 | The Last Ship | Jesse | Recurring (season 3); 8 episodes |
| 2016–2017 | Supergirl | Roulette / Veronica Sinclair | 2 episodes |
| 2018–2020 | Altered Carbon | Reileen Kawahara | Main role (season 1); 7 episodes Guest (season 2); 2 episodes |
| 2018–2021 | Animal Kingdom | Frankie | Recurring (seasons 3–5); 23 episodes |
| 2022–present | Severance | Ms. Casey | Main role |
| 2022 | Baymax! | Sayaka / Middle School Teacher; Additional voices | Voice, 5 episodes |
| 2024–2025 | Jurassic World: Chaos Theory | Soyona Santos | Voice, recurring role; 14 episodes |
| 2026 | Avatar: The Last Airbender | Avatar Yangchen | 2 episodes |

=== Web ===
| Year | Title | Role | Notes |
|---|---|---|---|
| 2011 | The Guild | Herself | Episode: "Social Traumas" |
| 2012 | Husbands | Pillow Girl #1 | Episode: "Appropriate Is Not the Word" |
| 2014 | Spooked | Carol | Episode: "Paranormal Professionals" |
| 2015 | Hollywood Hitmen | Eva | Episode: "The Tied Up Guy"; also producer |
| 2016 | Scary Endings | Laura (voice) | Episode: "The Grinning Man" |
| 2018 | There's a Special Place in Hell For Fashion Bloggers | Anjelica | Episode: "Wake and Bake" |
| 2024 | Webcam | Kitty | Short film |

== Awards and nominations ==
| Year | Award | Category | Work | Result | Ref. |
|---|---|---|---|---|---|
| 2015 | E! Online Best. Ever. TV. Awards | Best Fight (shared with Eliza Taylor) | The 100 | Runner-up | |
| 2022 | Screen Actors Guild Award | Outstanding Performance by an Ensemble in a Drama Series | Severance | Nominated | |
| 2025 | Screen Actors Guild Award | Outstanding Performance by an Ensemble in a Drama Series | Severance | Nominated | |
