= Adam J. Yeend =

Australian actor/producer (born 1980)

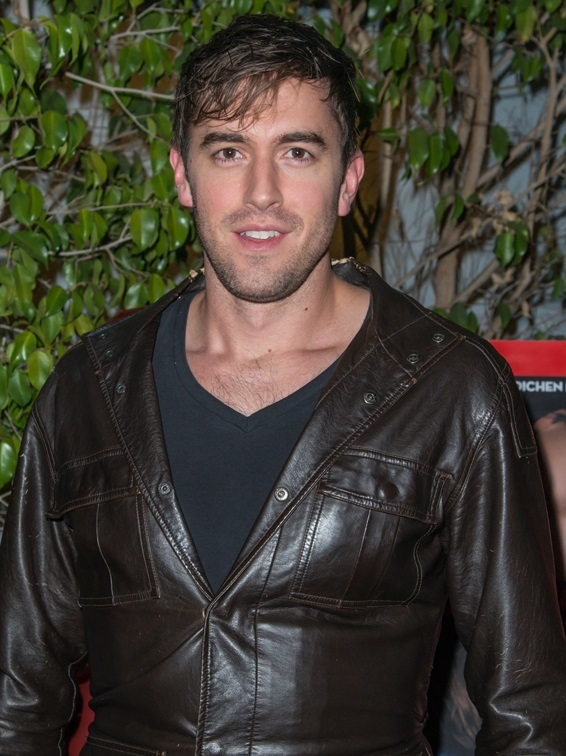
- Yeend attending the premiere of Lust for Love in Los Angeles, Feb 2014.
- Born: Adam James Yeend; 7 July 1980 (age 46); The Blue Mountains, Australia
- Education: University of Western Sydney
- Occupations: Actor, producer, writer
- Height: 6 ft 2 in (188 cm)

Adam J. Yeend is an Australian actor and writer best known for his roles in Offing David, Liz & Dick and Holding the Man, and producer of the 2014 feature film Lust for Love as well as the horror series Scary Endings. He was born in The Blue Mountains, Australia and resides in Los Angeles.

== Career ==
=== 2004–2018: Acting ===
Yeend studied acting with Lynette Sheldon and Fringe actor John Noble. He first appeared in several short films including Boys Grammar which also featured Jai Courtney, Untitled/The Trees, and The Saviour which was nominated for the 2007 Academy Award for Best Live Action Short Film. He shortly after appeared on Australian television in guest roles on headLand and All Saints. On stage, he toured the East Coast of Australia in The Hurting Game for Brainstorm Productions as well as other Sydney-based theatre productions. In 2008 he appeared in the lead role opposite Nathaniel Buzolic in the feature film Offing David.

After moving to Los Angeles in 2009, he continued to appear in various productions including the comedic short Baby Cake opposite Claire van der Boom; the film received universal acclaim and multiple festival screenings around the world. His first US TV appearance was in Lifetime Network's Elizabeth Taylor bio pic Liz & Dick with Lindsay Lohan and Grant Bowler, as well as appearing as an 'On-camera Winner's Escort' at the 84th Academy Awards. Expanding his facets into producing, he has worked on multiple projects including the independent romantic comedy Lust for Love which starred Dichen Lachman and Fran Kranz, Stigma and Skypemare with Cerina Vincent, Ryan Dillon and Annika Marks; the latter two he also featured in.

In 2013 he featured opposite NFL Cornerback Nnamdi Asomugha in Double Negative and was nominated for a Best Actor Award at the World Music & Independent Film Festival for his role as an addict in Alchemy - losing out to Steven Bauer In 2014, he has appeared in the Japanese World War II bio film An American Piano which premiered at the 2014 Cannes Film Festival, and has received strong critical praise for the starring role of John Caleo opposite Nate Jones, Cameron Daddo and Roxane Wilson for the Los Angeles production of the Australian classic, Holding the Man directed by Larry Moss. In 2015, he was nominated for Best Supporting actor in the drama category for his work in 'Holding the Man' for the 29th Annual Robby Awards in Los Angeles and appeared in the 5th season of the ABC drama Scandal.

Yeend produced the popular horror series Scary Endings and plays the title role opposite Jordan Ladd of the satirical thriller Brentwood Strangler which he also produced with the same production team behind Skypemare. In 2017 he featured opposite Empire actress Kaitlin Doubleday in a Scary Endings episode called "The Water Rises".

=== 2016–present: Writing and film ===
Yeend worked at 20th Century Fox (now 20th Century Studios) from 2016 and then with The Walt Disney Company following Disney's acquisition of Fox in early 2020. He has advocated for the importance of physical media, publishing an editorial piece for the long running film website Dark Horizons in 2021. In 2021, Yeend also became a features writer for the Academy of Motion Picture Arts and Sciences digital publication A.Frame, writing monthly pieces on 4K UHD film restoration and interviewing filmmakers such as Henry Selick, Brenda Chapman and Andrew Davis.

== Filmography ==
=== Film ===
Year	Title	Role	Notes
2020	Matcha & Vanilla	Matt O'Conner	Japan
2019	Synchronic	Kyle	
2016	Brentwood Strangler	Floyd Garison	Producer
2014	An American Piano	The Prisoner of War	2014 Cannes Film Festival
2014	Lust for Love		Co-Producer
2013	Skypemare (Short)	Gary Gray	Co-Producer
2013	Alchemy (Short)	The Man	Best Actor Nomination
2013	Double Negative (Short)	Kyle	
2012	Liz & Dick	The VIP's 1st AD	TV movie
2010	Baby Cake (Short)	Ritchie	
2008	Offing David	Matt	
2007	Untitled / The Trees (Short)	Sam / Lazlo	
2005	Eve (Short)	Mark	
2005	Boys Grammar (Short)	James	
2005	The Saviour (Short)	Mormon Elder	2007 Academy Award Nomination - Best Short

=== Television ===
Year	Title	Role	Notes
2017	Scary Endings	Matt	Season 2 Episode 3
2015	Scandal	Danny Mendoza	1 episode
2015	Scary Endings	Karl Ardo	Season 1 Episode 9
2014	Star Trek: Renegades	Starfleet Technical Officer (Cameo)	Production Assistant
2012	Liz & Dick (TV Movie)	The VIP's 1st AD	
2012	The Carousel (TV Pilot)	Aiden Howe	Series Regular
2011	Stigma (TV Mini-Series)	Robert	Writer/Producer
2008	All Saints	The Attendant	1 episode
2008	All Saints	The Vietnam Soldier	2 Episodes
2007	BlackJack: Ghosts (TV Movie)	Delivery Guy	
2005	headLand	Student Bully	2 Episodes

=== Theatre ===
Year	Title	Role	Notes
2014	Holding the Man	John Caleo	Los Angeles - Best Supp. Actor Nomination
2008	The Girl From the West of the City	Alex	Sydney
2007	Chain of Fools	Ben	Sydney
2006 - 2007	The Hurting Game	Jim	East Coast Australian Tour
