= Grace (2014 film) =

- Directed by: Heath Jones
- Screenplay by: Heath Jones
- Story by: Heath Jones; Cindy Joy Goggins
- Produced by: Sylvia Caminer
- Starring: Annika Marks; Sharon Lawrence; Chase Mowen; Cindy Joy Goggins
- Distributed by: C Joy Films
- Release date: April 18, 2014 (Nashville Film Festival)
- Running time: 95 minutes
- Country: United States
- Language: English

Grace, stylized Grace., is a 2014 U.S. drama film directed by Heath Jones and written by Jones and Cindy Goggins, starring Annika Marks, Sharon Lawrence, Chase Mowen and Cindy Joy Goggins. It is produced by Sylvia Caminer and was first released at the Nashville Film Festival on 18 April 2014.

== Cast ==
- Annika Marks as Grace Turner
- Sharon Lawrence as Sonia
- Chase Mowen as Reef
- Cindy Joy Goggins as Jessie
- Liam Springthorpe as Pickles
