= The Food Detectives =

Singaporean television series

The Food Detectives (known as The Food Files outside Singapore) is a Singaporean television documentary series produced by ActiveTV for Mediacorp's Channel 5 and presented by Nikki Muller. The series ran for three seasons from 2013 to 2016 and was followed by a spin-off, The Food Detectives vs. Diabetes in 2017.

The series is distributed worldwide by TVF International, a British company, and is also based on a similar format distributed by them, the New Zealand series What's Really In Our Food?.

== Premise ==
The series tackled myths and facts related to food. The series featured food experts who debunked several myths. The series is presented in an easy-to-understand manner.

The programme was lauded by the Media Development Authority's 2014 report on improvements of the production quality of programming with PSB credentials.

== Production ==
Recording for the second series began in 2014, with a trip to a poultry farm in Malaysia. The third season production was expected to conclude in the first quarter of 2016.

== Distribution ==
British distributor TVF International picked up the rights to the show outside Singapore. In 2014, the first two seasons were sold to Nat Geo People Asia, TVBI in some Asia-Pacific territories, Metro Channel in the Philippines, Stream TV in Russia, Ukraine and CIS countries and Fokus TV in Poland. In Poland, the series started airing on 2 December 2014, as Detektyw kulinarny.

The series started airing in South Africa on eReality on 7 April 2018.
