= Skypemare =

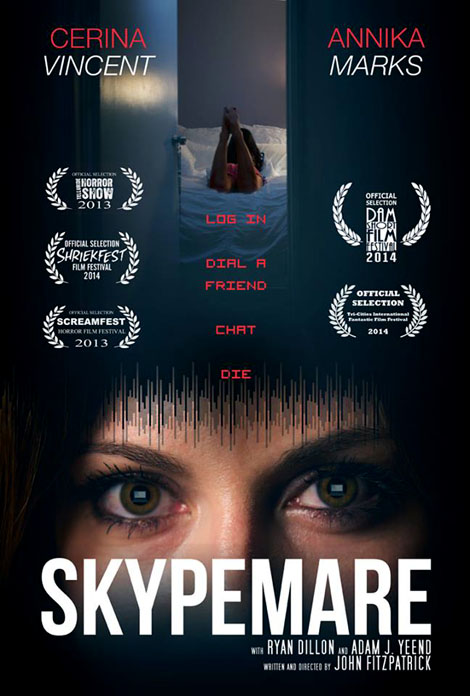
- Official release poster
- Directed by: John Fitzpatrick
- Written by: John Fitzpatrick
- Produced by: Ryan Dillon; John Fitzpatrick; Sarah Fitzpatrick; Adam J. Yeend
- Starring: Cerina Vincent; Annika Marks; Adam J. Yeend; Ryan Dillon
- Cinematography: Nicholas Kaat
- Edited by: John Fitzpatrick
- Music by: Aaron Goldstein
- Production company: Strangler Films LLC
- Distributed by: WhereIsTheRockHammer
- Release date: October 2013 (Telluride Horror Show)
- Running time: 8 minutes
- Country: United States
- Language: English

Skypemare is a 2013 American viral horror / thriller short film. It was written and directed by John Fitzpatrick, and stars 'scream queen' Cerina Vincent and Annika Marks. The film premiered at the 2013 Telluride Horror Show and followed multiple film festival screenings including Shriekfest and Screamfest. The short premiered online Halloween 2014 and became a viral YouTube short receiving over 1.5 million views. The same production team made a follow-up film Brentwood Strangler released in 2016.

== Premise ==
Alison is left home alone on Halloween night, but while chatting with her best friend Jenna over Skype, something terrifying happens to Jenna, leaving Alison helpless on the other side of the computer screen, watching in horror.

== Cast ==
- Cerina Vincent as Allison
- Annika Marks as Jenna
- Ryan Dillon as Steve
- Adam J. Yeend as Gary Gray
