= Studio Disney =

- Also known as: Disney Buzz
- Presented by: Michael Lee, Nikki Muller, Azura Zainal
- Voices of: John Kassir
- Countries of origin: Singapore, Mumbai, Australia
- No. of episodes: 230

Production
- Producer: Ashok Miranda
- Production location: Singapore

Original release
- Release: 1999 – 2006

Studio Disney (originally Studio D) is a show that aired on Disney Channel in Asia and Australia.

== History ==
It aired in Asia as Disney Buzz from May 1999 until it changed its name to Studio Disney in July 2003, and went off the air on 25 September 2005. The Asian version aired at weekends and has a total of 230 episodes, and was aired in its studio in Singapore. The hosts also did tours throughout Singapore, Philippines, Korea, and Malaysia in 2004. In Australia it aired from Monday 4 October 1999 until 2006. The program had 4 different show blocks, in which various Disney Channel shows were aired. The program was hosted by a team of presenters who would come in between shows to entertain the audience, often through jokes and games in which viewers were encouraged to call in to participate.

== Hosts ==
The initial hosts for the Asian version when it was known as Disney Buzz were Soo Kui Jien (known in the show as Jien) and Azura Zainal, with Jien later replaced in Season 1 of its incarnation as Studio D by Michael Lee from South Korea, Nikki Muller from the Philippines and Miru, a puppet Space Cat who was puppeteer-ed & voiced by John Kassir. In season 2 Miru left and was eventually succeeded by William. After Miru left, Michael, Nikki and Azura were the only hosts until William came on. Later on, Nikki left. The Asian version of Studio D was filmed at Ascent Media in Singapore (Season 1) and then moved to Media Corp Studios in Singapore where it was renamed to Studio Disney and had a new set for season 2. The show was produced by Ashok Miranda, the Executive Producer of the Southeast Asia and Korea division of Walt Disney Television International.

The hosts for the Indian version Big Bada Boom were Shiv Panditt, Zain Khan, Tara Sutaria and Murtuza Kutianawala. They hosted the show-within-the-show along with celebrity interviews of Bollywood celebrities. The Indian version of Studio Disney was filmed in Mumbai, India. It was directed by Anirban Bhattacharyya.

The original Australian hosts of the program were Dan Mills and Emily Perry. After a year Perry left and Amber Virtue came on board. They hosted the show for another few years then both decided to leave the show at the same time and were replaced by Scott Cain and Asha Kuerten and changed name from Studio D to Studio Disney during this transition. For unknown reasons Scott left (wasn't on air for a few months and Cartoon Dave and a few others filled in) some months in then Nathaniel Buzolic (Nat) took over his role and stayed for the remainder of the series. The Australian hosts were also involved in various 'shorties', in which they would have to undertake particular tasks. These included Dare Dan (where Dan would be dared to do something by viewers) and Piper Micoy (in which Amber tried out various occupations, such as jobs at Disneyland and an observatory). These were aired between shows, not usually within Studio D. The block later with AMTV was removed due to Nickelodeon's 'Sarvo' popularity.
