= Nick Palumbo =

American film director, producer and screenwriter

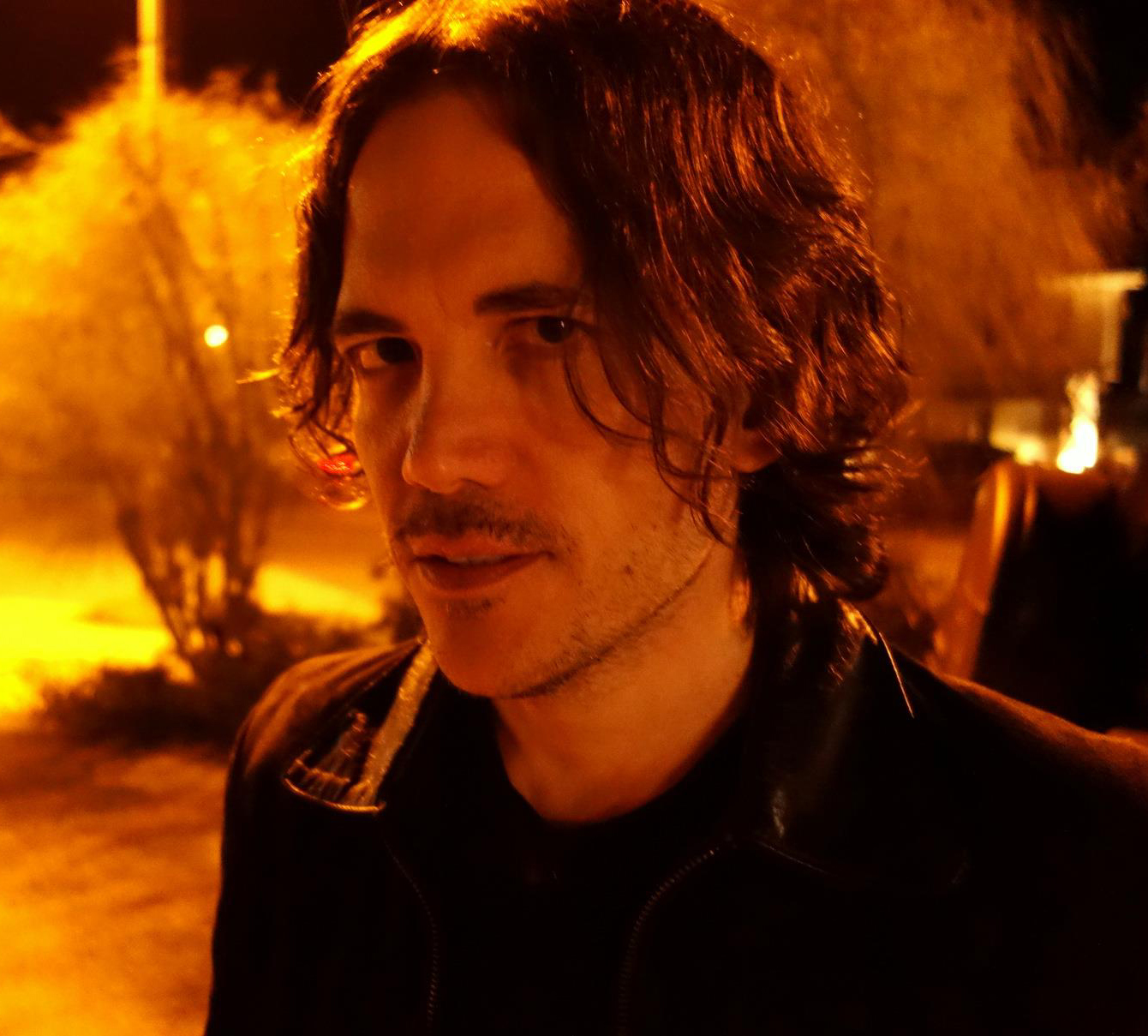
- Palumbo in 2014
- Born: November 12, 1970 (age 54); Washington, D.C., United States
- Occupation(s): Director, producer, screenwriter
- Years active: 1999–2004 (unconfirmed)
- Website: nickpalumbo.com

Nick Palumbo (born November 12, 1970) is an American film director, screenwriter and producer best known for the controversial 2004 film Murder-Set-Pieces.

== Films ==
Palumbo's film Murder-Set-Pieces was released to theatres on December 24, 2004. Rotten Tomatoes reported that 36% of 11 reviews for the film were positive, with an average rating of 3.7/10. On Metacritic, the film has a 13 out of 100 rating, based on 5 critics, signifying "overwhelming dislike".

Palumbo has not directed another film since 2004, but still has an active presence on Twitter.

== Filmography ==
- Nutbag (2000 serial killer film set in Las Vegas)
- Sinister (2002 short film)
- Murder-Set-Pieces (2004)
- Broken Things (2012 short film; "thanks" only)
