= Annika Marks =

American actress

- Born: Malmö, Sweden
- Occupations: Actress, writer, producer
- Years active: 2001–present

Annika Marks is an American actress, writer and producer. She had a supporting role in 2012 film The Sessions, and played leading roles in independent movies Grace (2014) and Anguish (2015). From 2014 to 2018 she played Monte Porter on Freeform drama series The Fosters.

== Early life ==
She was born in Malmö, Sweden while her father was attending graduate school there but raised mainly in Bellevue, Washington. She attended Bellevue High School and studied dance at Cornish College of the Arts and acting at Seattle Children's Theatre.

== Career ==
Marks started off her career in 2001 in the short-film G Spots?. In 2002 she had a guest starring role on Law & Order: Criminal Intent. In 2003 she had a small role in Mona Lisa Smile. In 2004, Marks starred in the independent drama, The Undeserved. She is perhaps best known for her role in the 2012 drama The Sessions alongside Helen Hunt, William H. Macy and John Hawkes. The film received wide critical acclaim. In 2014, Marks had the lead role in the indie film Grace. and in 2015 starred in the psychological drama Anguish.

On television, Marks has the recurring role as Monte Porter in the Freeform (formerly ABC Family) drama series, The Fosters. She also guest-starred on Southland, NCIS: New Orleans, Battle Creek, Flaked, and The Affair.

In 2015, she starred in the one-woman play All American Girl, by Wendy Graf. She will co-direct the short film The Games We Play with Rich Newey, which will be her first time directing. In 2016 she starred in The Model Apartment, by Donald Margulies at the Geffen Playhouse

She filmed the independent feature The Last Champion in early 2017.

She played Bernadette Davis on The Last Tycoon and Kathy Schroeder in the miniseries Waco.

== Personal life ==
She resides in Los Angeles. She is married to director Rich Newey.

== Filmography ==
=== Film ===
Year	Title	Role	Notes
2001	G Spots?	The Maiden	Short film
2003	Mona Lisa Smile	Art History Student	
2004	The Undeserved	Jenny	
2006	On the Brink	Elizabeth	Short film
2007	Tocatta & Fugue	Andi Fugue	
2008	Forced Attrition	Girl	Short film
2009	All the Times	Time 4	Short film
2009	Me, You, a Bag & Bamboo	Clifford's Ex	Short film
2010	The Mushroom Sessions	Catherine	Short film
2010	Hard to Come By	Patricia	Short film
2011	Secret Identity	Janet	Short film
2012	The Sessions	Amanda	
2013	Skypemare	Jenna	Video short
2014	Grace.	Grace Turner	
2015	Anguish	Jessica	
2015	Brentwood Strangler	Jenna	Short film
2016	The Games We Play	Molly	Short film, also writer and co-director
2018	Rehabilitation of the Hill	Michele	
2018	The Last Champion	Elizabeth Barnes	
2018	The World Without You	Noelle	
2020	Killing Eleanor	Natalie Grillo	Film

=== Television ===
Year	Title	Role	Notes
2002	Law & Order: Criminal Intent	Leeza Goldman	Episode: "Crazy"
2005	Mama & Son	Ramona	Television movie
2007	Afterworld	Ellen Murphy (voice)	Episode: "The Virus"
2012	Southland	Rebecca Kahan	Episode: "Community"
2013	Monday Mornings	Tory Britton	Episode: "Communion"
2014	NCIS: New Orleans	Lara Harding	Episode: "Carrier"
2014–2018	The Fosters	Monte Porter	Recurring role, 32 episodes
2015	Battle Creek	Dr. Steffi Owens	Episode: "The Hand-Off"
2016	Flaked	Brooke	Episode: "Electric"
2016	The Last Tycoon	Bernadette Davis	Recurring role, 5 episodes
2018	Waco	Kathy Schroder	Miniseries
2018	Goliath	Mary Roman	Recurring role, 4 episodes
2018	The Affair	Abby	Episode #4.2
