= By the Light of the Moon (The Vampire Diaries) =

- The Vampire Diaries episode
- Episode no.: Season 2 Episode 11
- Directed by: Elizabeth Allen
- Written by: Mike Daniels
- Cinematography by: Paul M. Sommers
- Editing by: Sean Albertson
- Production code: 2J5261
- Original air date: December 9, 2010

Guest appearances
- Lauren Cohan as Rose; Michaela McManus as Jules; Daniel Gillies as Elijah Mikaelson; Bryton James as Luka Martin; Randy J. Goodwin as Jonas Martin

Episode chronology
← Previous "The Sacrifice"	Next → "The Descent"
- The Vampire Diaries season 2

"By the Light of the Moon" is the eleventh episode of the second season of the American supernatural teen drama television series The Vampire Diaries, and the 33rd of the series. It aired on The CW on December 9, 2010. The episode was written by co-producer Mike Daniels and directed by Elizabeth Allen.

== Plot ==
Tyler (Michael Trevino) gets ready for his first transformation since it is a full moon night. He is terrified by it and he calls Mason (Taylor Kinney) for help once more but cannot reach him. Tyler leaves a message on Mason's phone where Jules (Michaela McManus), a friend of Mason's, hears it and realizes that Mason is missing.

Elena (Nina Dobrev) and Bonnie (Kat Graham) are in Elena's bedroom and talking about the moonstone and how Bonnie has to dispel it. Elena does not agree with the plan since it will make Klaus furious and he'll come to kill everyone but Elena; Jeremy (Steven R. McQueen) joins them and does not agree with Elena's suicidal plan. Bonnie and Jeremy leave Elena alone with the moonstone and Elena gets the opportunity to steal it and tries to sneak out of the house. She is stopped by Bonnie and Jeremy before she leaves and they tell her that they were testing her and she failed. They let her walk away but when she gets to the door, Elena realizes that she cannot get out of the house because Bonnie sealed her in with a spell.

Jules shows up at the Lockwood house just right before Tyler leaves. She introduces herself as Mason's friend and she tells Tyler and Carol (Susan Walters) that Mason is not back in Florida as they believe. Tyler leaves to meet Caroline (Candice Accola) at the Grill while Carol calls the Sheriff to report Mason's disappearance. Tyler tells Caroline about Mason and while they leave the Grill to go to the Lockwood cellar, Caroline manages to inform Alaric (Matt Davis) that Mason was reported missing.

Damon (Ian Somerhalder) gets to Elena's to check up on her since Bonnie has to work on the moonstone and Caroline has to be with Tyler. He gets a call from Alaric who informs him that Jules is in town and that the authorities are now searching for Mason. Damon has to leave for the Grill, leaving Jeremy with Elena. He meets Alaric at the Grill and they wonder if Jules is also a werewolf and decide to find out. Alaric puts some wolfsbane in her drink while Damon is distracting her. Alaric leaves and Damon tries to chat with Jules about Mason and get information. When he insists that she should drink her drink, Jules calls him out for trying to fool her and tells him that she smelled him and the wolfsbane since the beginning. She threatens Damon and leaves. Damon tries to follow her but Alaric stops him and asks him to go home, lock the doors, and wait to deal with it until the morning when the full moon is gone.

Bonnie goes to Luka (Bryton James) to apologize for channeling him and to return his talisman. Luka forgives her and agrees to help her unbind the spell from the moonstone. They set up everything they need and start chanting while the moonstone elevates and explodes in the air. Bonnie looks happy that they managed to break the moonstone and the spell.

Tyler and Caroline are in the Lockwood cellar where Tyler installs new chains in the floor and walls to chain himself and Caroline mixes a wolfsbane cocktail for him. He chains himself up and tries to drink the cocktail while Caroline stays there to support him. As time passes, Tyler feels the pain and screams and asks Caroline to leave so he will not hurt her. Caroline tries to stay with him as much as she can but when the transformation begins, Tyler cannot control himself and she runs out of the cellar closing the door behind her so Tyler cannot get out. She runs into the woods and goes back to the cellar later to check up on Tyler. Tyler is back in his human form and Caroline gets back into the cellar to help him.

Back at the Gilbert house, Jenna (Sara Canning) searches some files that Elena's mom was saving about the history of Mystic Falls, because she wants to help a "writer" who is working on a book. Elena seems fine with it and offers to help but she is terrified when she sees that the "writer" is Elijah (Daniel Gillies) and he is in the house. Elijah thanks Jenna for her help and pretends to leave. Elena runs to Jeremy's room to talk to him but Elijah stops her saying that he wants to talk to her.

Elijah and Elena get in her room and he lets her know that he doesn't want to break the curse and that he also does not intend to hurt her or anyone she loves. He says that Klaus has become paranoid over the years and he just wants to find where he is so he can kill him. Elijah wants to use Elena as bait to draw Klaus out and he makes a deal with Elena: she is to stop trying to kill herself and he will keep her family safe in return. Elena agrees but wants one more favor from him.

Luka returns to his home where Jonas (Randy J. Goodwin) is waiting for him. Jonas asks if he was successful and Luka responds in the affirmative and gives him the moonstone that he and Bonnie supposedly destroyed. Luka does not seem really fine that he had to fool Bonnie and after he gives the moonstone to Jonas he turns to leave. Jonas stops him telling him that Elijah wants them to do one more thing for him.

Damon is back at the Salvatore house where he finds Rose (Lauren Cohan) waiting for him. She apologizes for fleeing Slater's apartment when Elijah appeared and while they are talking they hear a noise of glass breaking. A werewolf breaks into the house and tries to attack Damon but Rose gets into the way and the werewolf bites her instead. Damon stabs the wolf with a sword and the injured wolf escapes. Damon checks up on Rose and they see that the bite starts healing. They are both relieved that the myth about the werewolf bite being fatal for vampires was not true.

Meanwhile, Stefan (Paul Wesley) is still stuck in the tomb with Katherine who tries to seduce him by invading his mind. Stefan wakes up and tells her to stay out of his head. They start talking with Stefan asking her to apologize for all the things she did but Katherine does not apologize. She tells him that she loves him and to prove it she tells him that Isobel, Elena's birth mother, can help him find Klaus. Their conversation is interrupted by Elijah who comes to the tomb to free Stefan. Elijah explains that he made a deal with Elena which she will explain to him and he is now free to exit the tomb since Elijah had the spell lifted. Stefan gets out of the tomb and Katherine tries to follow him but Elijah blocks her way and compels her to stay in there unless he tells her otherwise. He wants to make sure that Klaus will know exactly where she is when he comes to town. Katherine begs Stefan to not leave her in there but Stefan walks away to go find Elena and the two of them make up and are back together.

The episode ends with Damon apologizing to Rose for picking a fight with a werewolf that led to her getting bitten. Rose is just relieved that the myth was not real and the two of them agree to stay friends with benefits. They start to kiss but Rose feels pain on her shoulder, where the werewolf bit her. They check on her shoulder and they see that the area is not exactly healed and they look at each other with fear and confusion in their eyes.

== Feature music ==
In "By the Light of the Moon" we can hear the songs:

- "Quarry Hymns" by Land of Talk
- "Everything at Once" by Superchunk
- "I'm Alright" by Agent Ribbons
- "Let's Go Surfing" by The Drums
- "This Time Next Year" by Goldhawks
- "Shadowcasting" by Ra Ra Riot
- "Longest Night" by Howie Day

== Reception ==
=== Ratings ===
In its original American broadcast, "By the Light of the Moon" was watched by 3.16 million; down by 0.30 from the previous episode.

=== Reviews ===
"By the Light of the Moon" received positive reviews.

Emma Fraser from TV Over Mind gave an A rating to the episode saying that it was chock-full of story and emotion. "This was the night that focused on the wolf mythology which allowed this story to shine, really terrific work from all those involved. The Elena thread has moved along nicely and whilst seeing her rebel from those protecting her is an interesting angle it will be welcome to see her being less impulsive in her attempts at protection. With a new problem with the unknown effect of a wolf bite the next episode should be a treat."

Diana Steenbergen from IGN rated the episode with 8.5/10 saying that the episode was a typically overstuffed one, full of plot developments and intriguing character pairings. "As a mid-season finale, the ending was something of a letdown, especially for a show that thrives on shocking its audience in the last few minutes of so many episodes. But with several weeks before the next new Vampire Diaries, maybe it is for the best that we are not left with a more riveting cliffhanger."

Matt Richenthal of TV Fanatic rated the episode with 3.9/5 saying that it was not exactly the most action-packed episode and an overall letdown since this was the mid-season finale episode. However, Richenthal praised Michael Trevino and those who were involved in Tyler's transformation scene: "Full props, however, must be given to Michael Trevino, and, really, everyone involved in that transformation scene. It was intense and agonizing to watch... in the best possible way."

Robin Franson Pruter of Forced Viewing rated the episode with 3/4 saying that the werewolf transformation elevated a disjointed episode. "The strength of the transition sequence in this episode elevates it above the average. However, the episode would have been stronger had it been more unified and cohesive and had it tried to cover less ground."

Shannon Vestal from Buzzsugar gave a good review to the episode saying that it was entertaining but she also feels like it was a bit of a letdown. "As much as I love this show, it deserves a big come on this week. After a week of titillating previews of Stefan and Katherine mauling each other, it all turns out to be just a dream. What a letdown."

Meg of Two Cents TV also gave a good review saying that this was a great episode. "I thought this episode did a good job of moving the story forward past [...] We’re moving forward on the road to Klaus and the werewolf storyline just keeps getting more interesting."
