= Sons of Anarchy season 1 =

First season of TV series Sons of Anarchy

Sons of Anarchy
- Season 1
- DVD cover
- Starring: Charlie Hunnam; Katey Sagal; Mark Boone Junior; Kim Coates; Tommy Flanagan; Johnny Lewis; Maggie Siff; Ron Perlman
- No. of episodes: 13

Release
- Original network: FX
- Original release: September 3 – November 26, 2008

Season chronology
- Next → Season 2

The first season of the American television drama series Sons of Anarchy premiered on September 3, 2008, and concluded on November 26, 2008, after 13 episodes aired on cable network FX. It is also the only season to air on Wednesdays before the show moved to Tuesdays for the remainder of its run. Created by Kurt Sutter, it is about the lives of a close-knit outlaw motorcycle club operating in Charming, a fictional town in California's Central Valley. The show centers on protagonist Jackson "Jax" Teller (Charlie Hunnam), the vice president of the motorcycle club, who begins questioning the club and himself.

Sons of Anarchy is the story of the Teller-Morrow family of Charming, California, as well as other members of the Sons of Anarchy Motorcycle Club, Redwood Original (SAMCRO), their families, various Charming townspeople, allied and rival gangs, associates, and law agencies that undermine or support SAMCRO's legal and illegal enterprises.

== Plot ==
The series begins with the destruction of a warehouse the club uses to store and assemble guns, which is their main source of income, by a rival MC right before the overdose of Jax's Methamphetamine-addicted, pregnant ex-wife Wendy. An emergency C-section is performed, and their son Abel is delivered ten weeks prematurely. Jax finds his father's memoirs when he visits a storage unit to collect some old baby clothes. John Teller, Jax's father, was one of the founders of SAMCRO, and the book describes his trials with and hopes for the club. Jax's mother, Gemma Teller-Morrow, is now married to the President of SAMCRO, Clay Morrow. Jax's best friend Opie has just been released from prison for serving time for a club-related crime. The first season deals with Jax trying to reconcile things happening to the club with what he reads in his father's memoirs, Opie trying to take a lesser role in the club, and local and federal law enforcement trying to shut down SAMCRO.

== Cast and characters ==
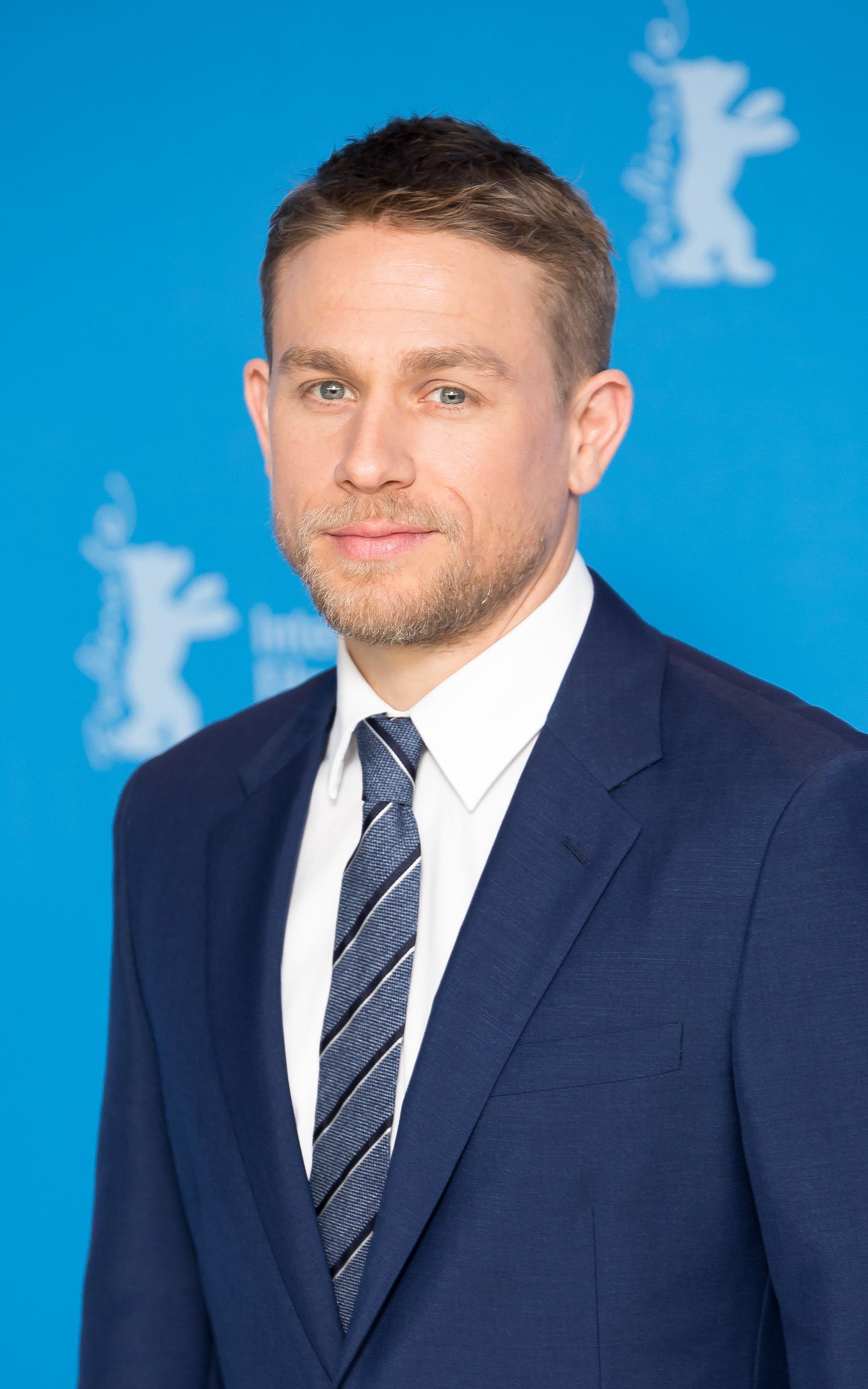
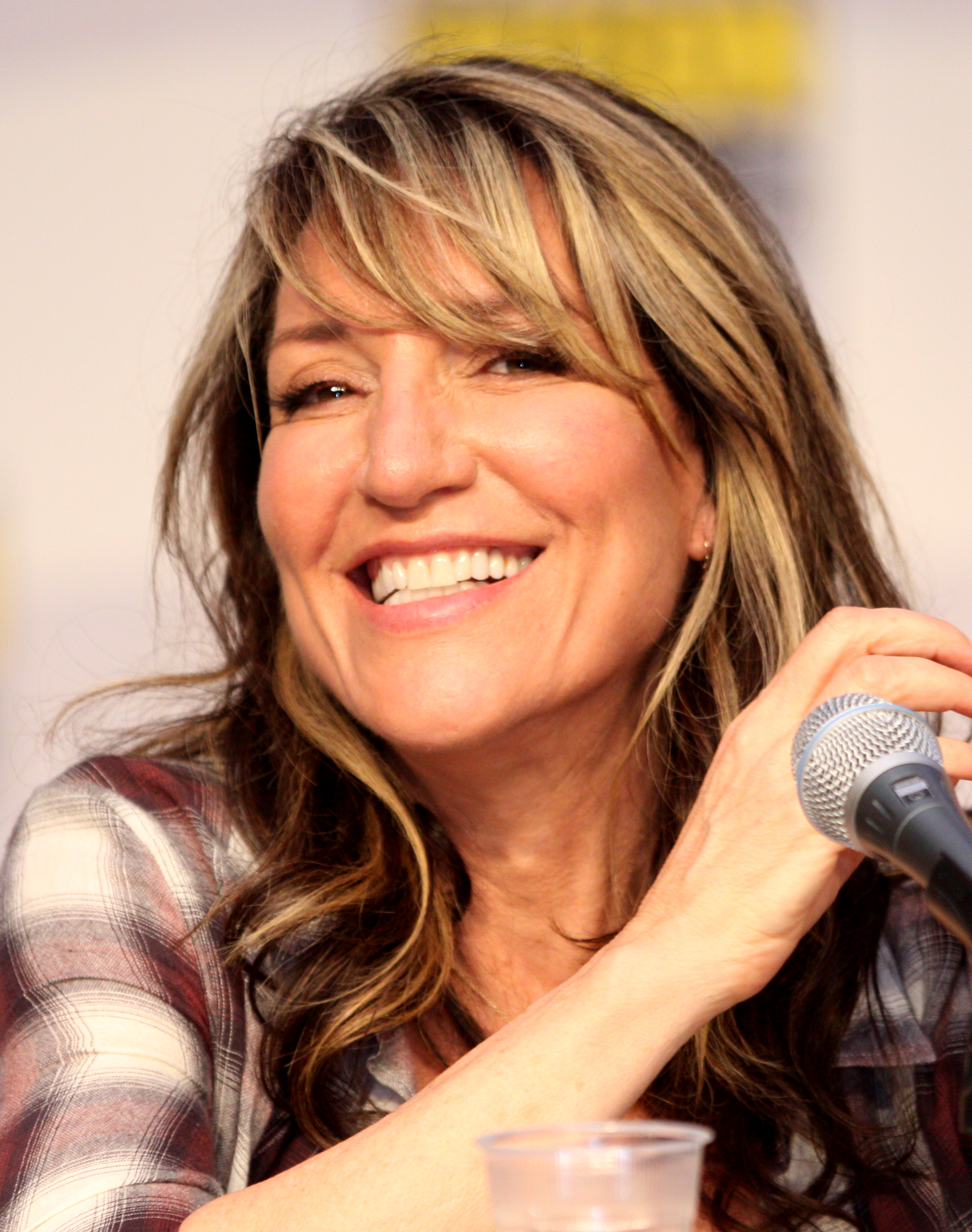
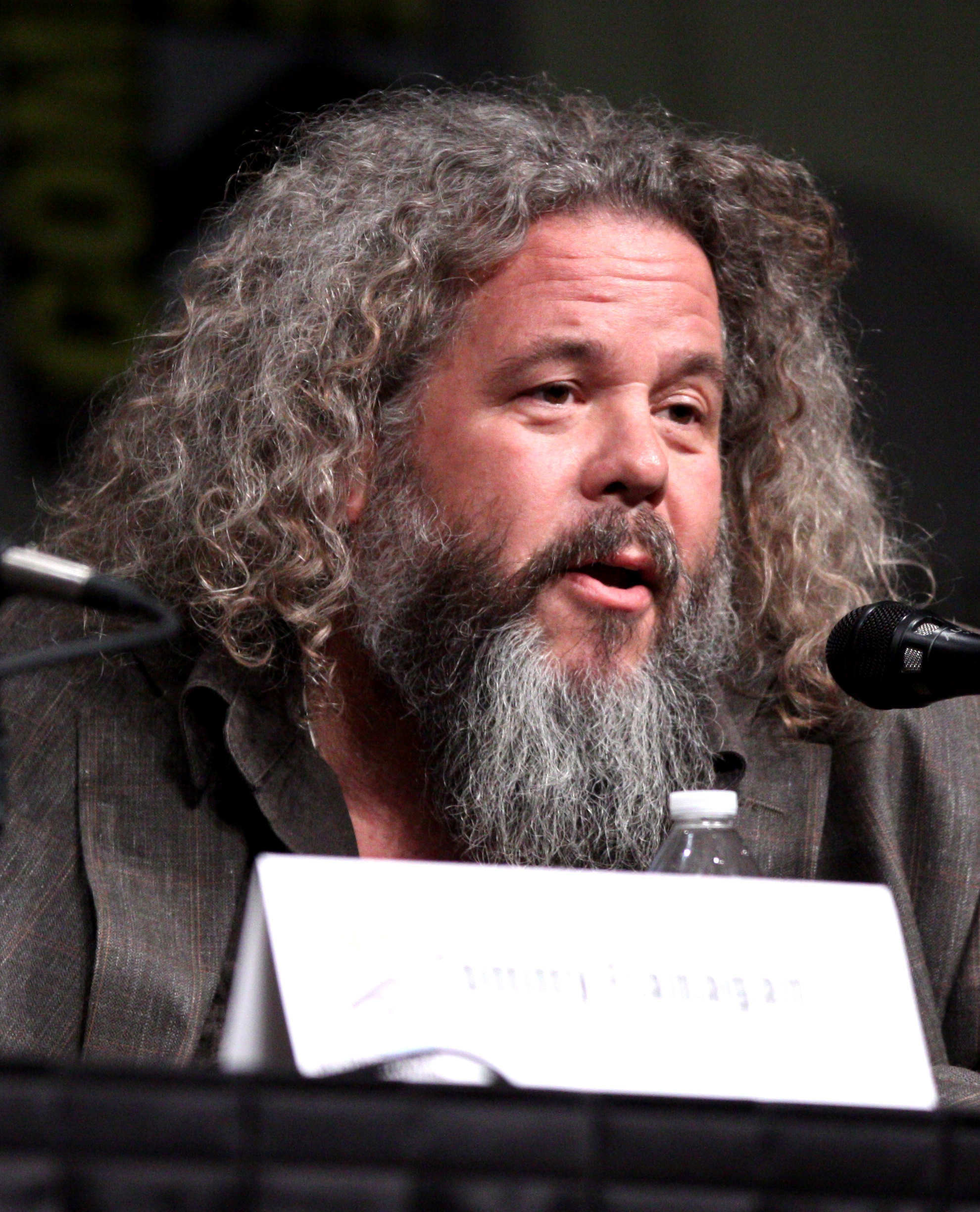
Charlie Hunnam (Jax Teller), Katey Sagal (Gemma Teller Morrow), and Mark Boone Junior (Bobby Munson)
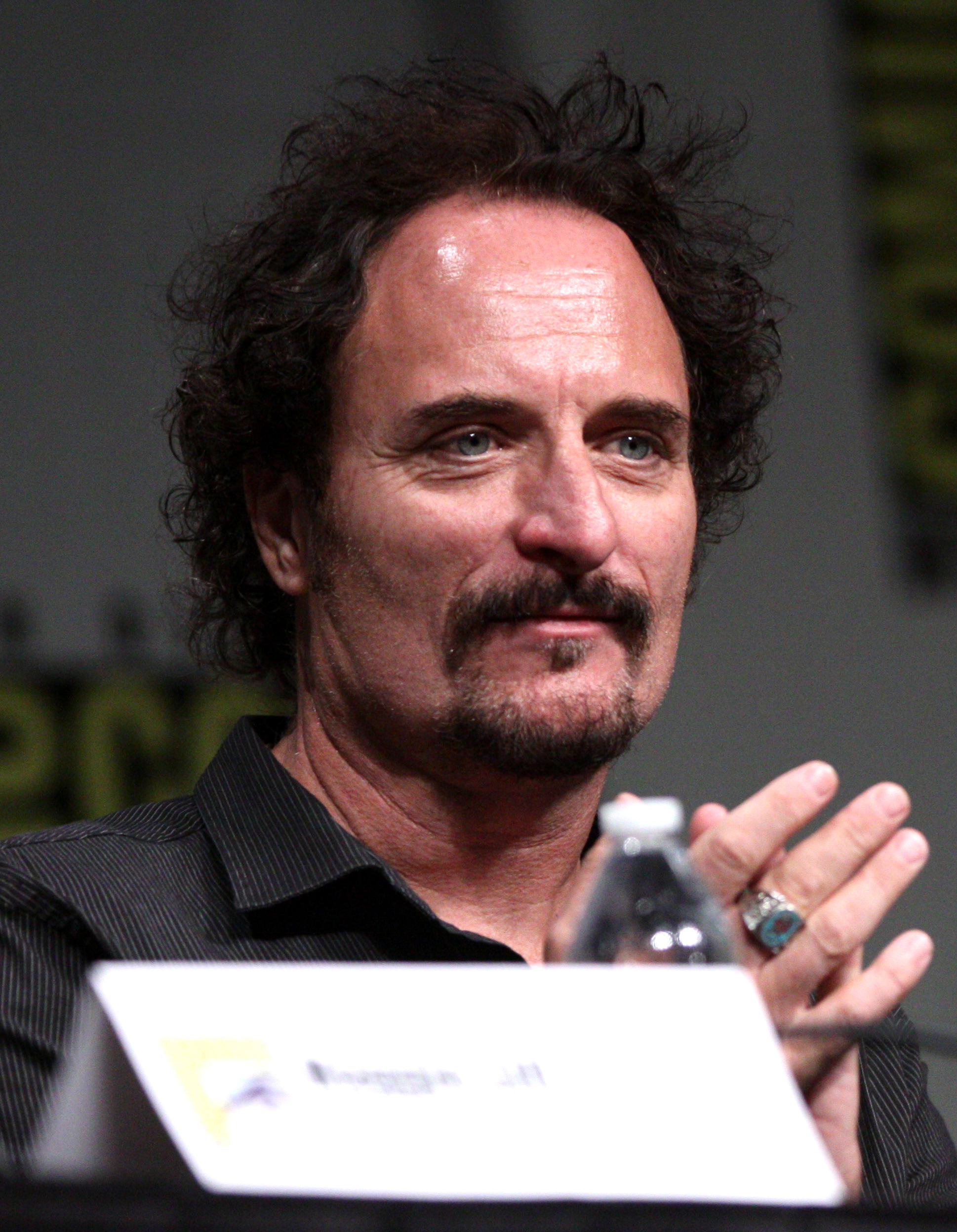
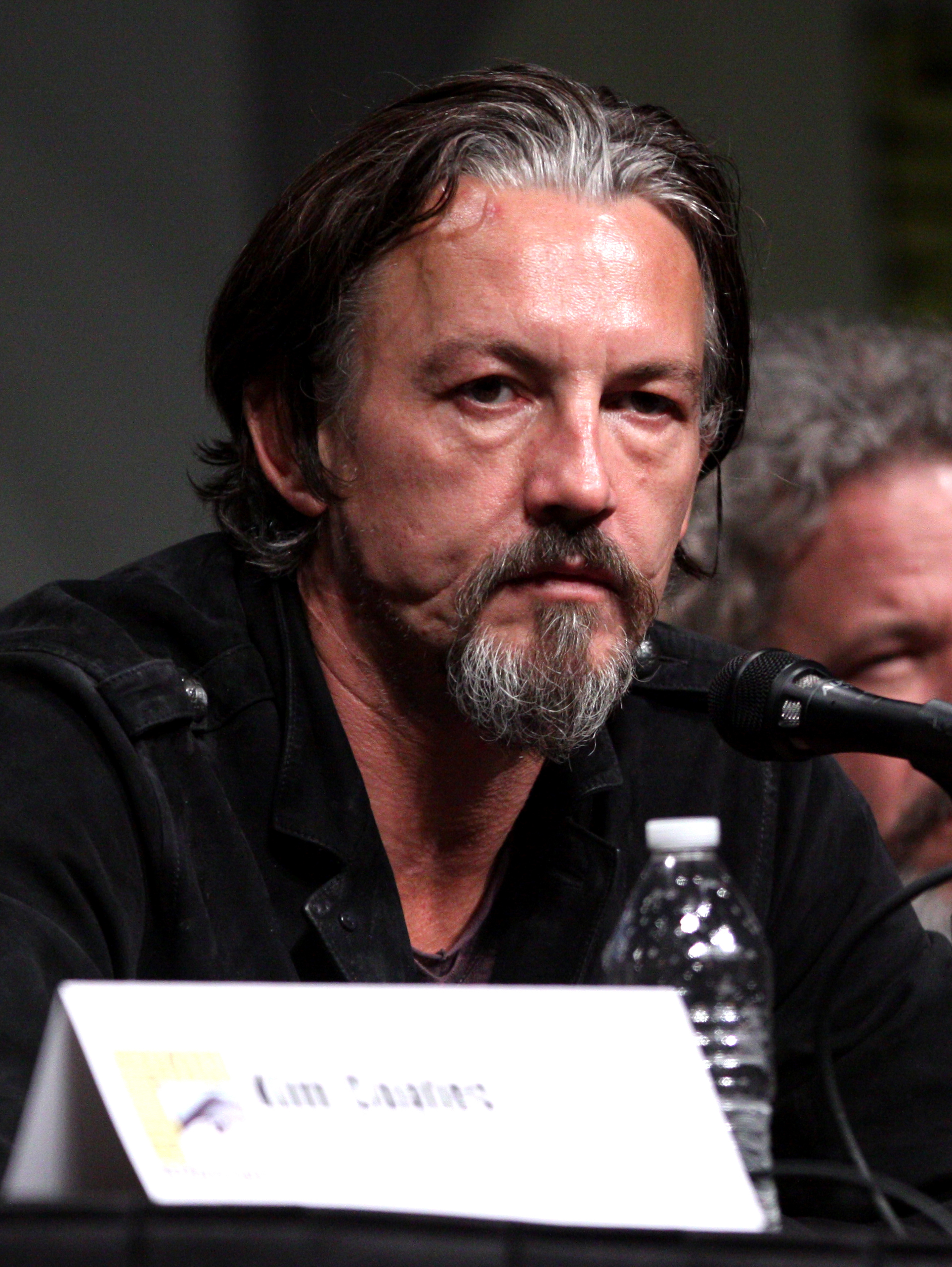
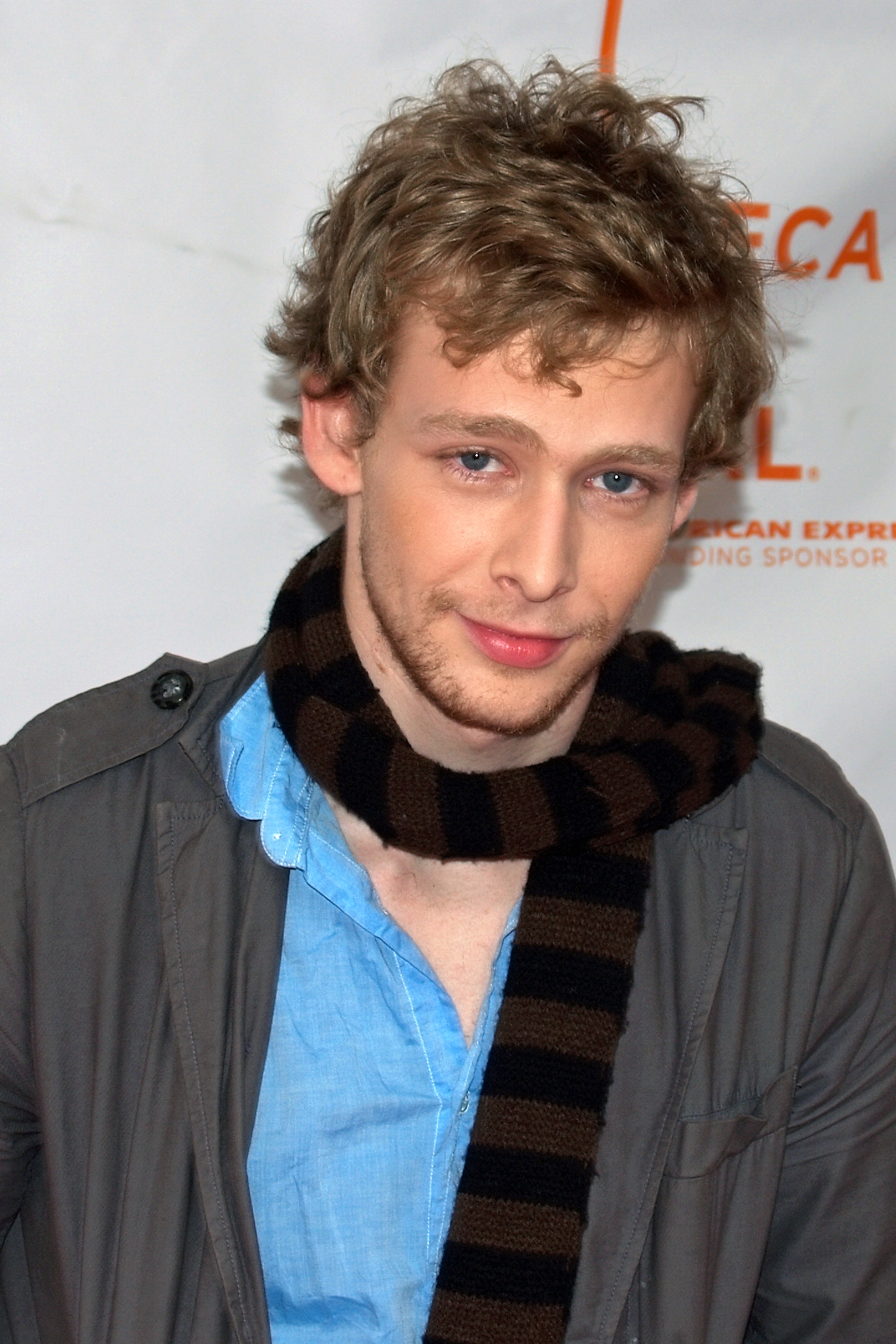
Kim Coates (Tig Trager), Tommy Flanagan (Chibs Telford), and Johnny Lewis (Half-Sack Epps)
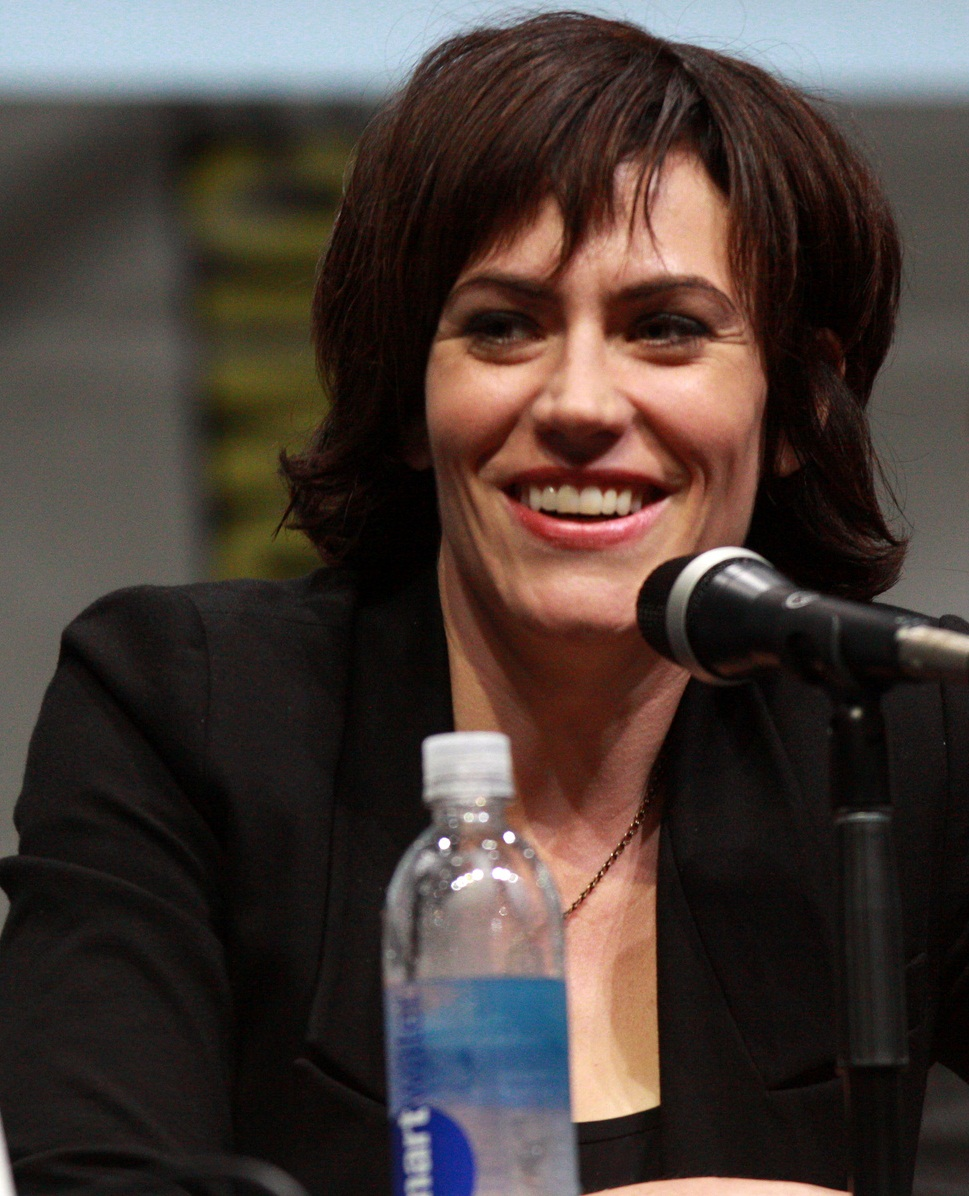
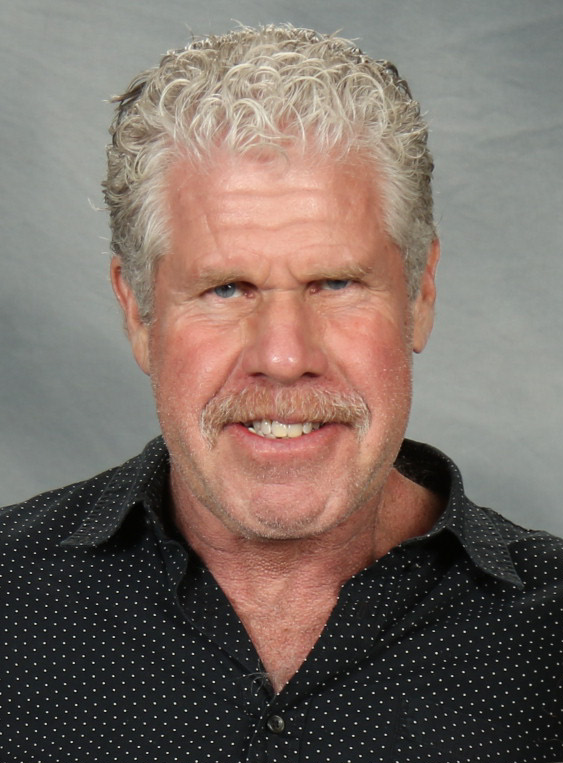
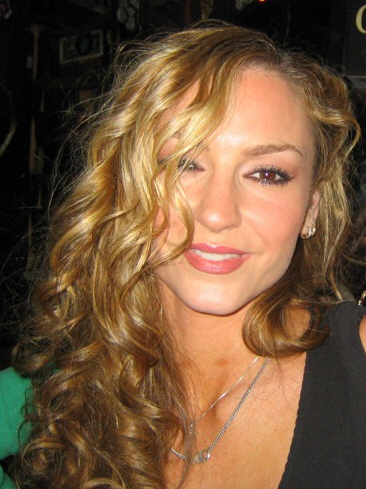
Maggie Siff (Tara Knowles), Ron Perlman (Clay Morrow), and Drea de Matteo (Wendy Case)

=== Main cast ===
- Charlie Hunnam as Jackson "Jax" Teller, a disillusioned club member who is Vice President of the Sons of Anarchy Motorcycle Club Redwood Original in Charming. He discovers a written diary by his late father John that makes him question his life and the club.
- Katey Sagal as Gemma Teller Morrow, Jax's mother and the queen of Charming. She is the matriarch of the club through her marriage to President Clay Morrow.
- Mark Boone Junior as Robert "Bobby Elvis" Munson, the Secretary and a former Vice President of SAMCRO, in Charming.
- Kim Coates as Alexander "Tig" Trager, a former Sergeant-at-Arms at the club.
- Tommy Flanagan as Filip "Chibs" Telford, a club member from Glasgow, Scotland. He is SAMCRO's connection with the IRA.
- Johnny Lewis as Kip "Half Sack" Epps, a prospect (prospective member) of the club, who often gets hazed by the club and is given undesirable tasks.
- Maggie Siff as Dr. Tara Knowles Jax's high-school sweetheart. She performs successful surgery on his premature child Abel.
- Ron Perlman as Clarence "Clay" Morrow, the President of SAMCRO. He is Jax's step-father and Gemma's husband.

=== Special guest cast ===
- Drea de Matteo as Wendy Case, Jax's ex-wife and Abel Teller's biological mother. She is a meth addict.
- Ally Walker as Agent June Stahl
- Tom Everett Scott as Rosen
- Brian Van Holt as Kyle Hobart

=== Recurring cast ===
- Dayton Callie as Chief Wayne Unser
- Theo Rossi as Juan-Carlos "Juice" Ortiz
- Ryan Hurst as Harry "Opie" Winston
- Taylor Sheridan as Deputy Chief David Hale
- William Lucking as Piermont "Piney" Winston
- Dendrie Taylor as Luann Delaney
- Sprague Grayden as Donna Winston
- Jay Karnes as Agent Joshua Kohn
- Mitch Pileggi as Ernest Darby, a member of a white supremacist gang called the Nordics
- Emilio Rivera as Marcus Álvarez
- Tory Kittles as Laroy Wayne
- Taryn Manning as Cherry / Rita
- Keir O'Donnell as Lowell Harland, Jr.
- Glenn Plummer as Sheriff Vic Trammel

=== Guest stars ===
- David LaBrava as Happy Lowman
- Patrick St. Esprit as Elliott Oswald
- Kurt Sutter as "Big" Otto Delaney
- Olivia Burnette as Homeless Woman
- Michael Shamus Wiles as Jury White
- Kenneth Choi as Henry Lin
- Michael Marisi Ornstein as Chuck Marstein

== Reception ==
The first season received generally positive reviews from industry critics. Matthew Gilbert of The Boston Globe said the first season had "real potential". The New York Times’ Gina Bellafante spoke highly of the cast's acting ability, particularly Sagal’s portrayal of Gemma. Brian Lowry of Variety gave a mixed review, admiring Sutter’s creation of the club and the town of Charming but observing the early episodes lacked direction.

On review aggregator website Rotten Tomatoes, the season has an approval rating of 88% based on 24 reviews. The site's critical consensus reads: "Rough and harsh, Sons of Anarchy features one of television's best ensemble casts."

== Production ==
Although Sons of Anarchy is set in Northern California's Central Valley, it is filmed primarily at Occidental Studios Stage 5A in North Hollywood. Main sets located there include the clubhouse, St. Thomas Hospital, and Jax's house. The production rooms at the studio used by the writing staff also double as the Charming police station. External scenes are often filmed nearby in Sun Valley and Tujunga. Interior and exterior scenes set in Northern Ireland during season 3 were also filmed at Occidental Studios and surrounding areas. A second unit shot footage in Northern Ireland used in the third season.

Originally, Scott Glenn was cast in the role of Clay Morrow and an entire pilot episode was filmed with him. However, series creator Kurt Sutter decided to go in a different direction with the character and re-cast Ron Perlman in the role, and Clay's scenes were re-shot. Additionally, Emilio Rivera was originally cast as a Sons of Anarchy club member named "Hawk," who eventually evolved into the character of Tig Trager. Also, the One-Niners street gang who buy weapons from SAMCRO first appeared in The Shield, which Sutter produced.

== Episodes ==
No. overall	No. in season	Title	Directed by	Written by	Original release date	Prod. code	U.S. viewers (millions)
1	1	"Pilot"	Allen Coulter; Michael Dinner	Kurt Sutter	September 3, 2008	1WAB79	2.53
The Mayans Motorcycle Club raids a warehouse in Charming, California full of guns belonging to the Sons, before burning it to the ground. Jackson "Jax" Teller, the vice president of SAMCRO, moves into the clubhouse after leaving his pregnant ex-wife Wendy Case, a drug addict. While visiting a storage locker looking for old baby items, he discovers his deceased father John's old keepsakes, including a memoir of John's life as a founding member of the club. The memoirs detail John's high hopes for and disappointments in the Sons of Anarchy. Jax's mother Gemma worries that her son is going soft, and relays this fear to her husband Clay Morrow; SAMCRO President.
2	2	"Seeds"	Charles Haid	Kurt Sutter	September 10, 2008	1WAB01	2.20
Deputy Police Chief David Hale discovers the bodies of two undocumented immigrants (whom Tig Trager was harboring in exchange for sexual favors) under the ruins of SAMCRO's burned-down arms warehouse. Charming's crooked Police Chief Wayne Unser promises to keep Hale off SAMCRO's trail if the club protects one of his delivery trucks. In order to distract the police for long enough to dispose of the bodies, Jax has Half-Sack dig up some recently-buried cadavers to dump in public. The gang hijacks Chief Unser's truck and blackmails him into delaying his retirement until SAMCRO can rebuild its gunrunning operation. Tara accuses Gemma of supplying Wendy, who is recovering from her overdose, with the heroin that almost killed her. Opie mulls the option of returning to SAMCRO in the face of mounting bills. Tig and Bobby retrieve the immigrants' bodies and cremate them.
3	3	"Fun Town"	Stephen Kay	Kurt Sutter	September 17, 2008	1WAB02	2.10
When Tristen - the teenage daughter of prominent Charming businessman and landowner Elliott Oswald - is raped during a visiting carnival, Oswald turns to SAMCRO for justice. The police look to Tristen for answers, but her parents protest, fearing that the case will attract media attention. SAMCRO's IRA connection arrives in Charming with a truckload of AK-47 rifles, hidden in oil barrels shipped from Dungloe, Ireland. After Wendy regains consciousness, Tara prods her to find out if Gemma supplied her with heroin. Gemma brings Wendy flowers and warns her not to tell Tara anything. Gemma then visits Tristen and her mother, and convinces them to reveal the rapist's identity. SAMCRO hunts down the rapist, a carnival clown, and brings him to Elliott, who brings a special knife normally used to castrate bulls which he planned to use to castrate the rapist. When Elliott has a change of heart and backs down, Clay performs the castration himself, then bags the fingerprinted knife to use as blackmail against Elliott, as Clay worries that property developers interested in Elliott's land will bring unwelcome attention to Charming.
4	4	"Patch Over"	Paris Barclay	James D. Parriott	September 24, 2008	1WAB03	2.25
The club travels to Indian Hills, Nevada to store arms with a brother club, The Devil's Tribe. When the Mayans pose a threat, Clay decides to "patch over" the Tribe, making them an official Sons of Anarchy charter. At a party celebrating the patching over, Half-Sack flirts with Cherry, a Tribe groupie, but Clay sleeps with her to punish Half-Sack for ogling Gemma. When Jax spots the Mayans' bikes idling outside a local bar, he lures them into an ambush at the Tribe's clubhouse. Joshua Kohn, an ATF agent, begins investigating SAMCRO and witnesses their shoot-out with the Mayans. Gemma attempts to learn more about Tara and warns her to keep away from Jax. Someone anonymously mails Tara a photo of Jax having sex with a girl he picked up on the way out to Indian Hills.
5	5	"Giving Back"	Tim Hunter	Jack LoGiudice	October 1, 2008	1WAB04	2.19
Gemma hosts a fundraiser for Charming High School, which brings Kyle Hobart, an excommunicated member responsible for Opie's arrest, back into town. Kyle and Opie settle their differences in a fistfight, but when Jax and Opie see that Kyle has not blacked out his Sons of Anarchy tattoo, they lure him to the clubhouse and have Tig burn it off with a blowtorch. Otto Delaney, a SAMCRO member imprisoned in Stockton, brokers a deal between Clay and Chuck Marstein, a bookkeeper who suffers from compulsive masturbation disorder. Marstein is seeking protection from his former employers in the Chinese mafia. The gang helps Chuck retrieve money from its hiding place in a Chinese restaurant, but upon discovering that the money is counterfeited, Clay makes a deal to hand Marstein over to mafioso Henry Lin. Tara is approached by Agent Kohn, who is revealed to be a former lover of her from Chicago that Tara still has a restraining order against.
6	6	"AK-51"	Seith Mann	Nichole Beattie	October 8, 2008	1WAB05	2.09
A small favour for Piney's old war buddy turns into a big problem for SAMCRO. With Clay detained, Jax must step up to handle the situation.
7	7	"Old Bones"	Gwyneth Horder-Payton	Dave Erickson	October 15, 2008	1WAB06	1.87
Tara asks Jax for a ride home from the hospital, and Agent Kohn follows them. Jax warns Kohn to stay away from Tara, and Kohn retaliates by breaking into Gemma's house and vandalizing Abel's nursery. Jax beats him savagely, and Kohn is fired for violating federal law and Tara's restraining order. A construction crew unearths the bones of three SAMCRO victims; two Mayans bikers and Lowell Harland Sr., the father of a mechanic at the auto shop. Clay tells Harland Jr. that his father was killed by the Mayans, but the police cause Harland Jr. to doubt Clay's account, and during a relapse, he accuses Clay of killing his father. Clay admits that he killed Harland Sr. because he was an abusive father and husband. Bobby tests Cherry's loyalty to Half-Sack by trying to sleep with her, but she rebuffs his advances. Clay, Tig, and Chibs fix a boxing match by placing a large bet against Half-Sack, but when Half-Sack misreads a hug between Cherry and Clay, he gets mad and K.O.'s his opponent instead of taking the fall.
8	8	"The Pull"	Guy Ferland	Kurt Sutter & Jack LoGiudice	October 22, 2008	1WAB07	2.14
Ernest Darby, the leader of the Nordics, receives an envelope in the mail from ex-agent Kohn with evidence linking SAMCRO to the IRA. Darby offers the intel to Mayans leader Marcus Alvarez in exchange for the murder of Clay Morrow. With the IRA gun payment looming, SAMCRO scrambles to come up with the cash. They turn to Otto's wife Luann Delaney, a porn producer, for a generous loan, and get the rest by stealing a hijacked oil truck back from the Nords and selling it to Chief Wayne Unser. Half-Sack steals an ambulance in an attempt to repay the money lost on his fixed boxing match, an attempt for which he is thoroughly mocked. The Mayans make a failed attempt on Clay during his meeting with the IRA connection, Cameron Hayes. Hayes is injured in the attempt and is taken to the clubhouse in Half-Sack's ambulance. The Mayans also send men after Darby, but leave after killing the wrong man. Jax goes to Tara's to retrieve medical supplies for Hayes. When he leaves, Kohn ambushes Tara, holding her at gunpoint and professing his love to her. He coerces her into 'confessing' to having an abortion when they were together, and then begins to undress, leaving his holstered pistol on a bedside table. He pins Tara down and attempts to rape her, and she plays along long enough to grab his pistol and shoot him in the stomach. Tara calls Jax for help, and when Jax arrives he offers to call the police, but warns that when Kohn is released from prison, he will be free to come after Tara again. Kohn hears them talking about him in the next room, and calls Tara a "biker whore." Jax rushes into the room and shoots Kohn in the head, killing him instantly, to Tara's horror. Jax calms her down and the two share a kiss before making love just feet away from Kohn's body. Meanwhile, SAMCRO and the Mayans prepare to go to war.
9	9	"Hell Followed"	Billy Gierhart	Brett Conrad	October 29, 2008	1WAB08	2.06
Jax buries Kohn in a shallow grave. Unser brings Clay and Darby in for questioning about the Mayans' attempts on their lives. Clay urges him to bring in Alvarez so that the three can parlay. Jax approaches Tara in the hospital for help patching up Hayes, who is in a bad way at the clubhouse. He asks her to stay in Charming despite all that's happened, and she agrees, confessing that Charming is the only place she felt safe. They return to the clubhouse and Tara patches up Hayes' wounds. Alvarez and Clay meet and negotiate a peace; Alvarez comes clean about Kohn's intel, and Clay offers to sell the Mayans arms for their turf war against the One-Niners. Clay warns Alvarez that his men will want blood for the attempted hit, and Alvarez offers up his son Esai, who is killed by Happy Lowman. Donna issues Opie an ultimatum: her or SAMCRO. Hayes offers to clear SAMCRO's gun debt and a free month of guns for the assassination of a whistleblower, Brenan Hefner. Opie volunteers to take on the job, and Clay sends Bobby and Jax along as backup. Opie freezes when faced with the act, and Bobby is forced to step in and finish the job. The three make a quick escape, but they are seen by Hefner's mistress. Jax returns to Kohn's grave to burn his corpse, and throws his father's memoirs into the fire before regretting his decision and retrieving the charred manuscript from the fire.
10	10	"Better Half"	Mario Van Peebles	Pat Charles	November 5, 2008	1WAB09	2.14
The ATF commandeers the Charming police station, and Agent Stahl places Unser on leave for his dealings with SAMCRO. Stahl puts pressure on the women of SAMCRO, raiding down Luann's porn company and grilling Donna, Cherry, Tara, and Gemma. Stahl heads up to Stockton State Prison to coax a confession from Luann's husband Otto in exchange for leniency in Luann's case. Donna prepares to leave Opie once and for all. Cherry is arrested for the arson of her abusive husband's condo in Nevada, but Jax convinces Unser to grant him access to the jail, where he warns Luann about Stahl's ploy with Otto before breaking Cherry out. During the jailbreak, Jax sees Deputy Chief Hale and Agent Stahl having sex. Luann warns Otto that the ATF is attempting to bring RICO charges against SAMCRO, and upon Stahl's next visit to Stockton, Otto attacks her. Jax orders Happy to smuggle Hayes and Cherry up to Canada.
11	11	"Capybara"	Stephen Kay	Kurt Sutter & Dave Erickson	November 12, 2008	1WAB10	2.22
Although Luann is released, the ATF raids the SAMCRO clubhouse and arrests Bobby for the murder of Brenan Hefner. Opie, meanwhile, is nowhere to be found, though Juice Ortiz brings Clay and Tig evidence that Opie and his family may be in witness protection. Jax is skeptical of the evidence, and correctly intuits that Agent Stahl is trying to paint Opie as a turncoat. Deputy Chief Hale takes issue with Stahl's blasé attitude towards Opie's safety. Stahl tries to convince Donna that the club will kill Opie when he is released from custody. The ATF releases Opie after 48 hours, and unbeknownst to him bug his cellphone, bike, and car. Tig searches Opie's things during a SAMCRO meeting and finds the bugs. Believing that he has turned on the club, Tig and Clay agree that Opie has to die. Jax's ex-wife Wendy returns from rehab and has a friendly visit with Jax and Abel in the hospital, causing Tara to doubt her future with Jax. Gemma tells Wendy that if Wendy stays clean and gets her act together, Gemma will do what she can to ensure that Wendy and Jax get back together.
12	12	"The Sleep of Babies"	Terrence O'Hara	Kurt Sutter	November 19, 2008	1WAB11	2.46
In need of cash to fund Bobby's defense, Clay's solution leaves SAMCRO in a vulnerable position. What is supposed to be a happy homecoming for Abel ends in more turmoil for the club.
13	13	"The Revelator"	Kurt Sutter	Kurt Sutter	November 26, 2008	1WAB12	2.48
In the wake of a great tragedy, the club must reevaluate their bonds of brotherhood.

== Home media release ==
The first season was released in the United States on DVD and Blu-ray on August 18, 2009.
