= Bree Condon =

American fashion model and actress

- Occupations: Actress, fashion model
- Modeling information
- Height: 5 ft 8 in (1.73 m)
- Hair color: Brown
- Eye color: Blue/Green

Bree Condon is an American fashion model and actress.

== Early life ==
Bree Condon was adopted on July 7, 1986 and grew up in Newport Beach, California. She graduated from Corona Del Mar High School in Newport Beach in 2004. After high school, she studied Acting at the Lost Studio by Cinda Jackson and joined the Alumni Theater Company. As part of the theater company, Condon played Hillary in the production "Masterpieces" by British playwright Sarah Daniels. She has defined playing Hillary as a "turning point" in her acting career, saying: "I took a leap straight into what I wanted but also feared, and I conquered what I knew I could. If I hadn’t taken the chance and stepped onto that stage night after night, and felt that flying feeling under those bright lights, I may not be where I am today."

== Career ==
=== Modeling ===
Condon has modeled for numerous major brands such as Guess, Frederick's of Hollywood, JC Penney, OPI, Smet, True Religion Jeans, Venus Swimwear, Silvian Heachand, Morellato and George Marciano. She has graced the magazine covers of Mexico's Vanidades, Argentina's Para ti, US' Brentwood, Ocean Drive, Santa Barbara Magazine and Vegas Essential. She has also been featured in Maxim magazine's swimsuit issue. In 2014, she appeared as a model in Agent Provocateur's commercial, directed by Penélope Cruz.

In 2006, she was the cover girl for a new remix version of the classic 1965 jazz album Whipped Cream & Other Delights by Herb Alpert & the Tijuana Brass. Condon wore a whipped cream bikini on the cover, echoing the famous shot of Dolores Erickson buried in a mound of cream on the 1965 cover. From 2008 to 2018 Bree Condon has been testimonial for Melluso, leading Italian shoes brand. In 2013 the Italian newspaper Il Corriere del Mezzogiorno run on Bree a feature with pictures by Gaetano Mansi.

=== Acting ===
Condon landed the lead role of student Mandii Carson in Raspberry & Lavender (2004). She had guest roles on numerous television shows, including Eleventh Hour, Samantha Who?, My Generation, The Vampire Diaries, Revenge, The Real O'Neals and Lucifer. Condon portrayed Ruth in Lifetime's film Whitney (2015), based on singer Whitney Houston. She had a recurring role as Sarah, a prosecutor working on a murder case, in the crime drama television series The Haves and the Have Nots (2017–2019). She portrayed Kimberly Guilfoyle in the drama film Bombshell (2019), based upon the accounts of the women at Fox News who set out to expose CEO Roger Ailes for sexual harassment. To prepare for her role as Kimberly, Condon read her book and watched videos of her online. Bombshell received generally favorable reviews and grossed $61.4 million at the worldwide box office.

== Personal life ==
In 2010, it was reported that Condon had been a victim of an unusual identity-theft scam, in which a man had impersonated her on dating websites and social media for two years, and had induced others (believing they were in communication with the real Condon) to send him money and gifts. When she became aware of the impersonator, Condon hired a private investigator and worked with the authorities to secure his arrest.

She married Jamie Harris, son of Irish actor Richard John Harris in August 2019, in San Miguel De Allende Mexico.

== Filmography ==
Film
Year	Title	Role	Notes
1997	Alternate Realities	Young Crystal	Short film
2004	Raspberry & Lavender	Mandii Carson	
2010	Scape	Sarah Jukes	
2011	Ironclad	Agnes	
2012	Garbage	Jessica	
2012	Beautiful	Woman	Short film
2016	Stevie D	Nicole	
2019	Bombshell	Kimberly Guilfoyle	

Television
Year	Title	Role	Notes
2009	Eleventh Hour	Hailey Vaughn	Episode: "Olfactus"
2009	Samantha Who?	Mickey	Episode: "The Other Woman"
2009	Radio Needles	Becky	TV movie
2010	The Vampire Diaries	Alice	Episode: "The Sacrifice"
2010	My Generation	Bree	3 episodes
2011	Funny or Die Presents	Secretary	7 episodes
2013	NCIS Los Angeles	Alessandra	Episode: "Purity"
2013	Hello Ladies	Brittany	Episode: "Pool Party"
2014	Revenge	Kristiana Rubins	Episode: "Revolution"
2015	Whitney	Secretary / Ruth	TV movie
2015	The Spoils Before Dying	Groovy VaVoom	4 episodes
2016	Crazy Ex-Girlfriend	New York Attorney #2	Episode: "Josh and I Go to Los Angeles!"
2016	The Young and the Restless	Jessica	4 episodes
2017	American Housewife	Woman #2	Episode: "The Club"
2017	The Real O'Neals	Karen	Episode: "The Real Heartbreak"
2017	Lucifer	Veronica	Episode: "Off the Record"
2017–19	The Haves and the Have Nots	Sarah	Recurring role; 19 episodes
