= Kiara Barnes =

American actress, singer and model (born 1996)

- Born: June 20, 1995 (age 31); Salt Lake City, Utah, U.S.
- Occupations: Actress, singer and model
- Years active: 2019–present
- Known for: The Bold and The Beautiful and Fantasy Island
- Height: 1.70 m (5 ft 6.93 in)
- Relatives: Kaden Barnes (brother)

Kiara Barnes (born 20 June 1995) is an American actress, singer and model known for The Bold and the Beautiful and Fantasy Island.

== Career ==
=== Modeling ===
Kiara Barnes began her career as a model.

=== Acting ===
From 2018 to 2021, she played Zoe Buckingham in the soap opera The Bold and the Beautiful. In 2020, she held the role of Octavia in the series Stuck with You. In the same year she held the role of Clarissa in the television film The Wrong Wedding Planner directed by David DeCoteau. From 2021 to 2023, she played the role of Ruby Akuda in the series Fantasy Island.

=== Music ===
In 2018 she released an EP, titled Sirens to the Moon.

== Filmography ==
=== TV series ===
Year	Title	Role	Notes
2018–2021	The Bold and the Beautiful	Zoe Buckingham	269 episodes
2020	Stuck with You	Octavia	2 episodes
2020	The Wrong Wedding Planner	Clarissa	Telefilme
2021–2023	Fantasy Island	Ruby Akuda	23 episodes
2024	Accused	Eve (Intimacy companion)	Episode: "Megan's Story"

== Discography ==
=== Singles ===
Year	Title
2018	Sirens to the Moon
