= Venus Fashion =

American clothing retailer

VENUS Fashion, Inc.
- Formerly: Venus Body Wear, Venus Swimwear
- Company type: Subsidiary
- Founded: 1984
- Headquarters: 11711 Marco Beach Drive; Jacksonville, Florida; United States
- Products: Clothing; Swimwear; Shoes; Accessories
- Number of employees: 850+
- Parent: American Exchange Group
- Website: www.venus.com

Venus is an American online and catalog fashion retailer headquartered in Jacksonville, Florida. The company sells clothing, shoes, jewelry and accessories for women. Venus is known for its swimwear and lingerie. The company is known for actively participating in charitable endeavors and community activities.

== Background ==
In 1982, Daryle Scott, IBM engineer and MBA student, and three other investors created a mail order apparel company that focused in competitive body suits. In 1984, Scott created Venus Body Wear, an American clothing and swimsuit retailer, selling ladies' leotards and exercise apparel via full-page advertisements in Cosmopolitan and other national magazines. A year later, the company expanded to include women’s swimwear and became known as Venus Swimwear. In 1998, the company opened its first retail store on the first level of the shopping mall, Jacksonville Landing. The store was located near The Body Shop and Foot Locker. During this time the company already had a Venus Factory Outlet on Beach Boulevard in Jacksonville.

In 1999, Venus acquired WinterSilks, a large importer of silk fashions. In 2000, reflecting the expanded offerings, the company name changed to Venus. In November 2006, Venus, Venus Manufacturing, and WinterSilks, were acquired 80% by Golden Gate Capital, under their Catalog Holdings Group. The three companies fell under a new, united company name, Venus Holdings, LLC. In 2007, Venus opened three new retail stores, including one at shopping mall Coconut Point in Estero. In 2009, Venus Holdings was acquired by the German catalog company Bon Prix, a subsidiary of Otto.

As of 2018, the company employs nearly 1,000 people, 600 of which work at the headquarters in Jacksonville, 300 people work at the distribution center and approximately 50 people work at a Venus fashion design office in Boca Raton. In September 2020, Venus announced that it is permanently laying off 120 jobs at its distribution center as part of a plan to open a second distribution facility on the west coast.

== In the media ==
In February 2012, Kate Upton and Julie Henderson wore bikinis by Venus in the annual Sports Illustrated Swimsuit Issue. Venus' swimwear has also been featured in the CBS talk show The Wendy Williams Show.

Venus has held an annual Venus Model Search since 1989. Venus Swimwear Model Search was documented in the fifth episode of the first season of HDNet's reality series Bikini Destinations in 2003.

=== Collaborations ===
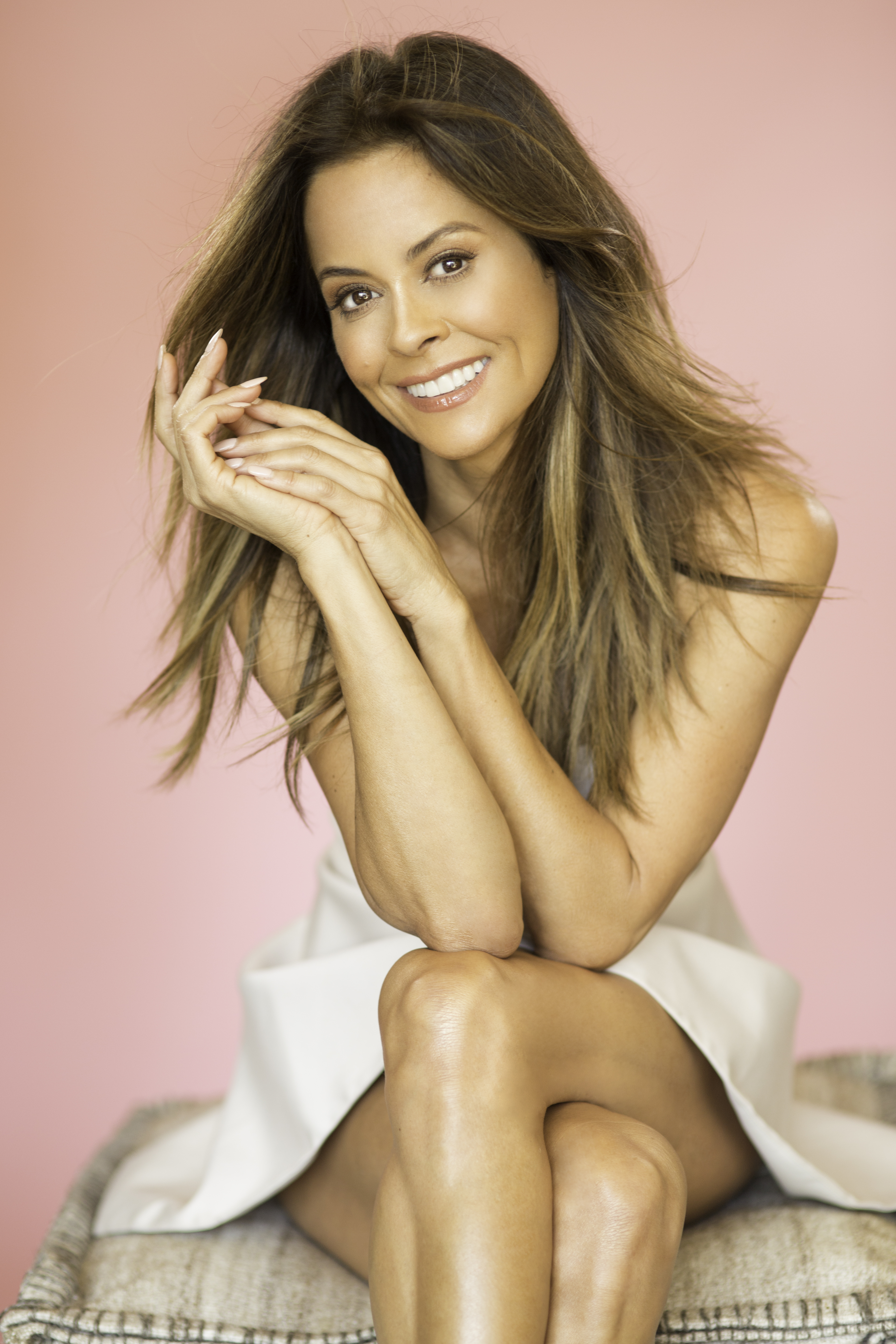
Model and actress Brooke Burke created a swimwear line with Venus

In 2002, actress and model Brooke Burke created a swimwear line called Barely Brooke with Venus. In June 2020, Venus Fashion launched a swimwear line with Sports Illustrated Swimsuit. The collaboration featured nearly 40 items, including long-sleeved one-pieces, tie-dye, neon, color-block and animal print swimwear and cover-ups. The pieces were priced between $85 and $140, and sold online. Select pieces from the collection were featured in the 2020 Sports Illustrated Swimsuit issue.

=== Sponsorships ===
- Official presenting sponsor for The Jacksonville ROAR 2014/2015 cheerleaders.

== Venus models ==
Model	Occupation	Known for
Bree Condon	Fashion model and actress	Appeared on the drama film Bombshell (2019)
Jessica Hart	Fashion model	Appeared on the magazine covers for Australian Vogue, Elle and GQ
Brooke Burke	Model and fitness personality	Host of E!'s Wild On! and CBS's reality show, Rock Star
Joanna Krupa	Model and television personality	Former cast member of Bravo's reality show The Real Housewives of Miami
Barbie Blank	Professional wrestler and model	World Wrestling Entertainment professional wrestler on the ECW Brand
Karen McDougal	Model and actress	Playboy's Playmate of the Month for December 1997 and Playmate of the Year of 1998
Nikki Schieler	Model and actress	Playboy's Playmate of the Month for September 1997
Dalene Kurtis	Model	Playboy's Playmate of the Month for September 2001 and Playmate of the Year of 2002
Rachel Reynolds	Model	Currently a prize model on CBS's game show The Price Is Right

== See also ==
- List of swimwear brands
