= Old Bones =

- Sons of Anarchy episode
- Episode no.: Season 1 Episode 7
- Directed by: Gwyneth Horder-Payton
- Written by: Dave Erickson
- Cinematography by: Paul Maibaum
- Editing by: Hunter M. Via
- Production code: 1WAB06
- Original air date: October 15, 2008
- Running time: 45 minutes

Guest appearances
- Ally Walker as June Stahl; Taylor Sheridan as David Hale; Dayton Callie as Wayne Unser; Keir O'Donnell as Lowell Harland; James Carraway as Floyd; Taryn Manning as Cherry; Jay Karnes as Josh Kohn

Episode chronology
← Previous "AK-51"	Next → "The Pull"

"Old Bones" is the seventh episode of the first season of the FX television series Sons of Anarchy. It was written by Dave Erickson, directed by Gwyneth Horder-Payton and originally aired on October 15, 2008 in the United States.

== Plot ==
Utility company employees working near Highway 44 dig up three skeletons while laying pipes. When SAMCRO hear the news, an emergency club meeting is arranged. Clay tells the crew that the bodies are Mayans killed in the SAMCRO-Mayan War of '91, and they need to stop them from being identified. In truth, however, one of the bodies actually belongs to Lowell Harland, Sr., a mechanic at Clay's garage who was killed for being a "junkie rat". Lowell Sr.'s son, Lowell, Jr., is now also a mechanic at the garage and a former drug addict. Tig is the only patch holder besides Clay who knows that Lowell, Sr. was murdered.

To raise funds to buy more guns from the Real IRA, the club decides to enter Half-Sack into a bare-knuckle boxing competition. Half-Sack, the former lightweight champion, is told to win his first five fights then take a dive in the sixth. This will allow SAMCRO to bet on his underdog opponent and earn a large pay-off. He is trained by Chibs, who recently returned from his trip with Michael McKeavey. Chibs insists Half-Sack has "no booze, no weed and no pussy". This means that Cherry must be kept away from him. To test her loyalty to Half-Sack, Bobby tries to have sex with Cherry at his house, but she refuses his advances.

That night, Clay, Tig and Jax go to the morgue to steal the bodies. In order to sneak in unnoticed, they must make sure no one is around; Tig shows the bite mark on his buttocks to the female doctors standing nearby, who flee in disgust. Clay tells Jax to wait outside and keep guard. Upon finding the first dead man, Tig sets about removing his teeth with pliers – until Jax appears and offers to lend a hand. He discovers that the body has already been identified and that it is Lowell Sr. Clay claims that Lowell, Sr. was killed by the Mayans and, after exacting revenge on his killers, Clay and Tig buried all three bodies together.

At the police station, Agents Hale and Stahl, having identified the bodies, suspect Clay of the murders and decide to use their suspicions to turn Lowell, Jr. against SAMCRO. They bring him to the station and tell him of his father's fate and where he was buried. Later, at the garage, Clay tries to convince Lowell otherwise, telling him the same story he told Jax earlier. Lowell seems to have believed the police’s story, however, and goes missing. Worried that he may be a liability to the club, Clay heads off to track down and kill him. He finds Lowell at a motel and puts a gun to his head, preparing to kill him. However, he has a change of heart and decides to tell Lowell the truth and bring him home.

== Reception ==
Zach Handler of The AV Club gave "Old Bones" a B rating, stating; "'Old Bones' felt mostly like set-up. Between Half-Sack and Jax we got some decent fights, but the bare knuckle con was a little too Honeymooners, and as satisfying as Kohn's beat-down was, it didn't feel like anything had resolved. Given that Sons has already been renewed, I'm wondering how much of Gemma and Clay's machinations will fall apart this season; hopefully we'll get something more than the meaningful glances and veiled comments we've been living off so far."
