= Elizabeth Craft and Sarah Fain =

American television screenwriters and producers

- Education: The Pembroke Hill School; Craft: Columbia University Fain: Williams College
- Occupations: Writers, producers
- Spouse: Craft: Adam Fierro
- Relatives: Craft: Gretchen Rubin (sister)

Elizabeth Craft and Sarah Fain are American television screenwriters and producers, mostly working together as partners. They have also written two young adult fiction novels together.

Craft and Fain are from Kansas City, Missouri, and wrote their first piece together when they were 15 years old for their high school newspaper. Both Craft and Fain attended The Pembroke Hill School. Craft graduated from Columbia College in 1993. She is married to producer Adam Fierro and is the sister of writer Gretchen Rubin. Fain graduated from Williams College in 1993.

== Career ==
=== The Fix ===
Craft and Fain were executive producers, creators and writers on the limited television series The Fix. On this project they partnered with Marcia Clark, who was a co-executive producer. The Fix aired its ten episodes on ABC.

=== Angel ===
Craft and Fain joined Mutant Enemy Productions in 2002, during the fourth season of Joss Whedon's Angel. They penned eight episodes of seasons 4 and 5 and served as the show's executive story editors during its fifth season.

=== The Shield ===
After Angel went off air in 2004, Craft and Fain joined the staff of The Shield as co-producers of the show's fourth season. They eventually became producers of the fifth, and supervising producers of the sixth season, also writing several episodes during this time.

=== Women's Murder Club ===
In 2007, Craft and Fain created Women's Murder Club, a police procedural drama produced by 20th Century Fox Television and airing on ABC. The show premiered on October 12, 2007, and Craft and Fain also served as its executive producers. After producing the first ten episodes, the show went on hiatus due to the 2007–2008 Writers Guild of America strike, and Craft and Fain were subsequently fired from the project. They were therefore not involved in the final three episodes of Women's Murder Club.

=== Dollhouse ===
In 2008, Craft and Fain returned to working with Joss Whedon on his new series Dollhouse as showrunners. The show, produced by 20th Century Fox Television, got a thirteen-episode commitment by Fox and began airing there in February 2009, running for two seasons.

=== Lie to Me ===
When the cancellation of Dollhouse was announced, Fox moved Craft and Fain to the writing staff of the new TV series Lie to Me, which surprised Joss Whedon fans. Craft and Fain were under contract to Fox, not Whedon, and they explained that it was a decision by their employers in which they had little say.

=== Secret Circle ===
Craft and Fain in 2010 developed a series with Kevin Williamson for The CW based upon The Secret Circle book trilogy by L. J. Smith. Screenwriter Andrew Miller penned the pilot. Secret Circle follows a 16-year-old girl named Cassie, who moves to New Salem and enrolls in a high school there but she soon discovers that she and the other students are witches.

=== Fantasy Island ===
Craft and Fain rebooted Fantasy Island for Fox in 2021.

== Novels ==
The duo have written two novels, Bass Ackwards and Belly Up and its sequel Footfree and Fancyloose. The books follow nine months in the life of four teenage best friends, Harper, Becca, Kate, and Sophie.

== Happier in Hollywood podcast ==
On her weekly podcast Happier with Gretchen Rubin, Craft discusses good habits and happiness with her New York-based sister, Gretchen Rubin.

Elizabeth and Sarah started their own spinoff of the podcast, titled "Happier in Hollywood," in May 2017.

== Filmography ==
Year	Title	Credited as		Notes
Year	Title	Writers	Producers	Notes
2000	Just Deal	Yes	No	"The Tutor"
2001	All About Us	Yes	No	"No Means No"
2002	Glory Days	Yes	No	"The Lost Girls","Everybody Loves Rudy"; Also story editors and executive story editors
2002–04	Angel	Yes	No	8 episodes
2005–07	The Shield	Yes	Yes	Wrote 6 episodes Also co-producers, producers, and supervising producers
2007–08	Women's Murder Club	Yes	Executive	Developers, wrote 3 episodes
2009	Dollhouse	Yes	Yes	Co-executive producers, wrote "Gray Hour", "Echoes"
2009–10	Lie to Me	Yes	Executive	Wrote 4 episodes, also supervising producers
2010–11	The Vampire Diaries	Yes	Yes	Consulting producers, wrote "Plan B" and "The Descent"
2011	The Secret Circle	No	Executive	
2012–13	666 Park Avenue	Yes	Yes	Consulting producers, wrote "Hero Complex" and "The Elysian Fields"
2014	The 100	Yes	Executive	Wrote "Earth Kills" and "Day Trip"
2016	The Family	Yes	Yes	Consulting producers, wrote "All the Livelong Day" and "What Took so Long"
2018	For The People	Yes	Yes	Consulting producers, wrote "The Library Fountain"
2019	The Fix	Yes	Executive	Co-creators, wrote 3 episodes
2021–2023	Fantasy Island	Yes	Executive	Wrote 3 episodes ("The Big Five Oh" by Fain only)
