= The Sacrifice (The Vampire Diaries) =

- The Vampire Diaries episode
- Episode no.: Season 2 Episode 10
- Directed by: Ralph Hemecker
- Written by: Caroline Dries
- Cinematography by: Paul M. Sommers
- Editing by: Joshua Butler
- Production code: 2J5260
- Original air date: December 2, 2010

Guest appearances
- Lauren Cohan as Rose; Taylor Kinney as Mason Lockwood; Daniel Gillies as Elijah Mikaelson; Bryton James as Luka Martin; Trevor Peterson as Slater; Randy J. Goodwin as Jonas Martin; Bree Condon as Alice; James Harvey Ward as Cody

Episode chronology
← Previous "Katerina"	Next → "By the Light of the Moon"
- The Vampire Diaries season 2

"The Sacrifice" is the tenth episode of the second season of the American supernatural teen drama television series The Vampire Diaries, and the 32nd of the series. It aired on The CW on December 2, 2010. The episode was written by supervising producer Caroline Dries and directed by Ralph Hemecker.

== Plot ==
The episode starts with Elena (Nina Dobrev) hearing a noise in the middle of the night; she gets up to check what it is and runs into Alaric (Matt Davis) and Jenna (Sara Canning). The three of them start talking while Jonas (Randy J. Goodwin), who is in the house, gets into Elena's bedroom and steals some of Elena's personal items. Jonas manages to get out before Elena sees him.

Stefan (Paul Wesley) and Damon (Ian Somerhalder) go to see Katherine at the tomb and ask for the moonstone. Katherine refuses to give it to them unless they get a witch to get her out of the tomb with the promise that she'll leave Mystic Falls and never come back. The brothers go to Elena's house to inform her about their plan: de-spell the moonstone so Klaus will not be able to use it to break the curse. They just need Bonnie (Kat Graham) to drop the spell for a few moments so they can get into the tomb and get the moonstone from Katherine. Elena does not agree with their plan because Klaus will get there and kill them all.

Bonnie and Luka (Bryton James) talk and Bonnie tells him about the nosebleeds she has and he informs her that is because she is doing too much magic. He also introduces her to a new "trick" where witches can channel their energy to other witches and they switch personal items to show her how it's done. Jeremy (Steven R. McQueen) arrives and Luka goes, without returning Bonnie's bracelet to her and not taking his tags back.

Elena gets to the Salvatore house to speak with Rose (Lauren Cohan) and she asks her to take her to Slater (Trevor Peterson) so she can find out more about the moonstone. Rose refuses to do it but she changes her mind when Elena promises her that she knows a witch that can make her a daylight ring. They arrive at Slater's apartment only to find him dead. Elena tries to get into his computer to find the info she needs but cannot gets past the security password. They hear a noise and discover that Slater's girlfriend Alice (Bree Condon) is hiding in the closet crying.

Matt (Zach Roerig) approaches Tyler (Michael Trevino) to apologize for picking up a fight with him that led to Sara's death. Caroline (Candice Accola) joins them and when Matt leaves she tries to talk to Tyler about his first transformation and if he has any plans for it. Tyler does not want to tell her at first but he eventually takes her to the old Lockwood cellar where Mason (Taylor Kinney) chained himself up during the full moons. Tyler's plan is to chain himself up like Mason so he will not hurt anyone when he becomes a wolf. At the cellar, they find Mason's journal where he describes everything about his first transformation along with a USB stick.

Back at the Salvatore house, Bonnie tells Damon, Stefan and Jeremy that she can lift the tomb spell for a while so they can take the moonstone. Jeremy worries about her after the nosebleeds and tries to change her mind but he cannot do it. Bonnie has something more in her mind and asks for something that belonged to Katherine. Stefan brings the photograph of Katherine from 1864 and Bonnie burns it while chanting a spell. Damon wonders what it is about and Bonnie explains that if they toss the ash to Katherine then she will not be able to do anything for a while. Jeremy is still worrying about Bonnie, so to spare her from doing the spell at the tomb, he steals some of the ashes and decides to go alone to the tomb and take the moonstone.

Elena tries to console Alice and also asks her to help them get into Slater's files. Alice does not want to help but she changes her mind when Elena tells her that if she does, Rose will turn her into a vampire. With Alice's help, they find another contact of Slater's, Cody (James Harvey Ward), and Elena sends him a message to deliver to Klaus: that the doppelganger is alive and wants to surrender. Rose realizes that this was Elena's plan since the beginning and not to learn more about the moonstone. She tries to change her mind but Elena does not want to hear it, so Rose calls Damon. In the meantime, Elijah (Daniel Gillies) wants to find out where Elena is. Jonas uses Elena's things he took from her bedroom and with a spell, he can make Elijah see where Elena is.

At Caroline's house, Caroline and Tyler continue to read Mason's journal and also see the footage off the USB. Mason taped his first transformation and described everything about it in his journal. Tyler freaks out with the video and the details and he does not want to go through it but Caroline tries to encourage him and lets him know that she will be there with him. The door bell rings and Matt is at the door. He tries to tell Caroline that he misses her when Tyler comes to the door and Matt feels awkward.

Jeremy gets to the tomb alone to take the moonstone. He stakes Katherine and tosses the ashes to her and she collapses. He gets into the tomb and starts searching for the moonstone. Jeremy finds the moonstone but not before Katherine awakes. She attacks him and drinks his blood but Jeremy manages to throw the moonstone out of the tomb. Stefan and Bonnie arrive at the tomb, find the moonstone, and wonder what happened. Katherine appears with Jeremy and tells them that they will not get him back until they let her out.

Bonnie starts the spell so Stefan can get into the tomb and get Jeremy out. At the same time, Luka gets back home from school and he starts to feel Bonnie channeling his powers. He tells his father that he let Bonnie channel with him earlier because he asked him to bond with her and now she is channeling him for some spell. Both Luka and Bonnie begin to nosebleed and Stefan tries to stop Bonnie while Luka collapses. Bonnie falls unconscious and when she gets back she realizes that she can't do the spell, even with help. Katherine gets the opportunity to torture Jeremy and Stefan rushes into the tomb to save him. He manages to get Jeremy out of the tomb but now he is trapped inside it with Katherine.

Damon arrives at Slater's apartment to get Elena out of there but she refuses to go with him since she is determined to sacrifice herself to save everyone she loves. Cody arrives minutes later with two other vampires to take Elena and Damon gets ready to defend her. Elijah arrives and when he learns that no one else knows that Elena is there, he kills Cody and the two other vampires and then leaves, leaving Damon and Elena wondering why he did that.

Elijah gets back to Jonas house and after he asks about Luka's health, he explains that he did not kill Damon because both Salvatore brothers would do anything to protect Elena and for now, this is exactly what he wants too. Elena gets back home with Damon to learn from Jeremy that Stefan is stuck in the tomb with Katherine. Elena runs to the tomb but Damon follows her and stops her before she gets in. Elena leaves and Stefan makes Damon promise him that he'll protect her and keep her away from the tomb. Damon promises and leaves and Katherine points out to Stefan that this was the biggest mistake of his life.

== Feature music ==
In "The Sacrifice" we can hear the songs:

- "No Way Out" by Rie Sinclair
- "Love's To Blame" by Joel and Luke
- "Only Happy When It Rains" by Kat Graham

== Reception ==
=== Ratings ===
In its original American broadcast, "The Sacrifice" was watched by 3.46 million; down by 0.04 from the previous episode.

=== Reviews ===
"The Sacrifice" received positive reviews.

Diana Steenbergen from IGN rated the episode with 8/10. "Once again The Vampire Diaries packs so much character drama into the episode that the time goes by quickly. Maybe they did not get much accomplished in terms of figuring out how to protect Elena, but it is entertaining nonetheless."

Matt Richenthal of TV Fanatic rated the episode with 4.5/5 saying that there were plenty of developments in the episode that led to plenty of questions. "It's the emotions that underlie every action. More than any installment I can recall, "The Sacrifice" moved at lightning speed, scarcely taking a moment to let the characters, and viewers, breathe. In the end, though, there was no major surprise or suspenseful cliffhanger. There was simply the reminder that this show works so well because we're so invested in its core relationships."

Reagan of The TV Chick gave a B+ rating to the episode saying that it was a pretty solid episode. "This episode started off slow for me. But, then it got awesome. I really like where things are going with the whole Elijah and Dr. Martin situation. I really am not positive if they’re totally bad."

Josie Kafka from Doux Reviews rated the episode with 3.5/4. "This was one of the most jam-packed episodes we’ve seen yet. [...] It was wonderfully intriguing, and has set up a billion conflicts for next week."
