= Fantasy Island (2021 TV series) =

American fantasy drama television series

- Genre: Fantasy; Drama
- Based on: Fantasy Island by Gene Levitt
- Developed by: Elizabeth Craft & Sarah Fain
- Starring: Roselyn Sánchez; Kiara Barnes; John Gabriel Rodriquez
- Theme music composer: Laurence Rosenthal
- Composer: Genevieve Vincent
- Country of origin: United States
- Original language: English
- No. of seasons: 2
- No. of episodes: 23

Production
- Executive producers: Adam Kane; Anne Clements; Elizabeth Craft & Sarah Fain
- Producers: Frances Lausell; Mark Grossan
- Production location: Puerto Rico
- Cinematography: Sonnel Velázquez; Santiago Benet Mari; Raphy Molinary
- Editors: Kevin Armstrong; David Michael Maurer; Waldemar Centeno; Raúl Marchand; Pedro Muñiz; Robert Zalkind; Pedro Muñiz López; Mark J. Goldman; Andrés Ramírez Molina; George Pilkinton
- Running time: 42–43 minutes
- Production companies: Happier in Hollywood; Fox Entertainment; Gemstone Studios

Original release
- Network: Fox
- Release: August 10, 2021 – May 8, 2023

Fantasy Island (stylized as FANTASY ISLⱯND) is an American fantasy drama television series developed by Elizabeth Craft and Sarah Fain for Fox. It is a sequel to and maintains continuity with the original 1977 series. The series premiered on August 10, 2021, with a preview special, Welcome to the New Fantasy Island, which aired two days before. In November 2021, the series was renewed for a second season, and a holiday special aired on December 23, 2021. The second season premiered on January 2, 2023. In May 2023, the series was canceled after two seasons.

== Cast and characters ==
=== Main ===
- Roselyn Sánchez as Elena Roarke, a grand niece of Mr. Roarke from the original series
- Kiara Barnes as Ruby Akuda, Elena's associate co-host on the island
- John Gabriel Rodriquez as Javier (season 2; recurring season 1), the head of transportation on the island and Elena's love interest

=== Recurring ===
- Daniel Lugo as Segundo (season 2; co-starring season 1)
- Gabriela Z. Hernández as Dr. Gina (season 2; co-starring season 1)
- Alexa Mansour as Helene (season 2), Javier's daughter

In addition, María Gabriela González co-stars as Isla, Ruby's love interest for the second season.

=== Guest ===
- Bellamy Young as Christine Collins (season 1)
- Odette Annable as Daphne (season 1)
- Dave Annable as Zev (season 1)
- Daphne Zuniga as Margot (season 1)
- Josie Bissett as Camille (season 1)
- Laura Leighton as Nettie (season 1)
- Leslie Jordan as Jasper (season 1)
- Teri Hatcher as Dolly (season 2)
- James Denton as Dutch (season 2)
- Jason Priestley as Gavin Beck (season 2)

== Episodes ==
=== Series overview ===
Season	Episodes	Originally released	
Season	Episodes	First released	Last released
Special		August 8, 2021	
1	10	August 10, 2021	December 23, 2021
2	13	January 2, 2023	May 8, 2023

=== Special (2021) ===
Title	Directed by	Written by	Original release date	U.S. viewers (millions)
"Welcome to the New Fantasy Island"	Andy Meyers	Brian Kahn	August 8, 2021	0.55

=== Season 1 (2021) ===
No. overall	No. in season	Title	Directed by	Written by	Original release date	Prod. code	U.S viewers (millions)
1	1	"Hungry Christine / Mel Loves Ruby"	Adam Kane	Teleplay by : Elizabeth Craft & Sarah Fain	August 10, 2021	101	2.05
After suffering from a breakdown, morning host Christine wants to spend her time on the island eating all the things she would not because of her job. This results in her realizing that her stepfather was the cause of her body issues stemming from childhood. Meanwhile Mel and Ruby Akuda want to enjoy their time before Ruby dies of a terminal illness. Their fantasy has them turning into their younger selves to enjoy the island. In a night of drunkenness, Ruby meets Isla and gets a back tattoo. She ends up staying on the island to avoid dying, causing Mel to return home alone.
2	2	"His and Hers / The Heartbreak Hotel"	Adam Kane	Teleplay by : Jane Espenson; Story by : Our Lady J	August 17, 2021	102	1.72
Two adventurers, Daphne and Zev, come to the island wanting an adventure together. This results in them swapping bodies. At first they enjoy the swap and later learn that Daphne is pregnant. Meanwhile widower Brent has spent 35 years asleep on the island. One of the only rules Roarke had was for a mandatory period of 48 hours that he would have to spend awake. He spends his time conversing with Roarke, allowing Ruby to realize what Roarke does on the island.
3	3	"Quantum Entanglement"	Kimberly McCullough	Adria Lang	August 24, 2021	104	1.60
Flamboyant Eileen arrives on the island via helicopter wanting to spend time with her estranged daughter and grandchild. Eileen ends up becoming invisible where she learns that her daughter felt pushed aside due to Eileen wanting the spotlight. Meanwhile Eileen meets the second guest, physics professor Charles, who wants to experience something that he cannot explain. The two communicate through touch as he is the only one who can hear Eileen. He ends up helping Eileen reconnect with her family. Throughout this, Ruby is feeling homesick as she cannot call off the island to her husband or her children.
4	4	"Once Upon a Time in Havana"	Laura Belsey	Dailyn Rodriguez	August 31, 2021	103	1.58
Fifteen year old Alma runs away from home due to wanting to be accepted as a percussionist by her Cuban family. Unfortunately for her they do not as of yet do so. Her fantasy has her travelling to 1967 Havana in the past where she meets the younger versions of her great-uncle, grandfather, and grandmother just days before they were set to leave for Miami. Meanwhile as Roarke spends time in Havana with a friend, Ruby is given a list which results in her meeting various others on the island including Segundo and Dr. Gina.
5	5	"Twice in a Lifetime"	Tara Miele	Sono Patel	September 7, 2021	105	1.45
Nisha comes to the island with a list of goals wondering what she should choose: her long-term boyfriend Josh, or the setup of her parents, Savin. Her fantasy has her bouncing through both lives and seeing the differences. As the lives differ, Nisha never really enjoys either life fully, resulting in her choosing herself.
6	6	"The Big Five Oh"	Diana Valentine	Adria Lang; Story by : Sarah Fain	September 12, 2021	107	2.03
Old friends Nettie, Camille and Margot come to the island to celebrate their fiftieth birthdays, but the celebration exposes some of the problems in their relationship.
7	7	"The Romance & the Bromance"	Laura Belsey	Mary Angélica Molina & Adam Belanoff	September 14, 2021	106	1.24
Isabel Marshall asks for an opportunity to spend time with her favourite author, and finds herself back in the late 1800s with Reginald and Rachel Coldwater. During this visit, Isabel realises that Reginald has been taking credit for Rachel's work and encourages Rachel to stand up for herself. This culminates in Isabel choosing to go back in time and stay with Rachel for good.
8	8	"Día de los Vivos"	Rachel Raimist	Adam Fierro	September 19, 2021	108	1.71
Many dead return to the island to spend time with loved ones in "Day of the Living". While Roarke wants to meet up with her cousin, Ruby spends the day with her husband Mel. It is only later that they realize that he is dead, which is why he was there. Jasper is on the island and is surprised to see his old protégé Ramon, who was among the people he hurt in life. Not wanting to reconnect, Jasper tries to run away before approaching the man. Roarke's cousin doesn't appear but his old chair is unearthed for Roarke.
9	9	"Welcome to the Snow Globe, Part One"	Steven Tsuchida	Ben Edlund	December 23, 2021	109	1.81
When businesswoman Allison comes to the island, it is for the Hallmark-Christmas movie fantasy. Unbeknown to her, Roarke goes into her fantasy causing the dream guy to be Roarke's former fiancee whom she left to work on the island. At the same time, Allison's former co-worker and fling arrives wanting to spend time with her. Meanwhile Mr. Jones, the dog, has to deal with his wife and ex-business partner coming to the island. In the background, Ruby decides to form a Secret Santa with the island residents and receives Dr. Gina as her secret santa.
10	10	"Welcome to the Snow Globe, Part Two"	Jude Weng	Jane Espenson	December 23, 2021	110	1.81
After Roarke realizes that her former fiancee is around, she removes him from the fantasy, causing things to go wrong for Allison. It just makes Allison realize that her co-worker is the guy for her. Meanwhile Mr. Jones, now human, realizes that his former business partner was the cause of his problems as well as making a move on his wife in his absence.

=== Season 2 (2023) ===
No. overall	No. in season	Title	Directed by	Written by	Original release date	Prod. code	U.S viewers (millions)
11	1	"Tara and Jessica's High School Reunion / Cat Lady"	Adam Kane	Adria Lang	January 2, 2023	201	1.70
When Tara and Jessica want to know what it's like to be popular for their upcoming 30th high school reunion, they manage to have it on the island. During the event they learn secrets from the past and decide to make some changes on their futures. At the same time, a cat lady wishes to understand what her cat is saying, resulting in him turning human. Throughout it all, Roake and Javier enjoy their new relationship.
12	2	"Hurricane Helene / The Bachelor Party"	Adam Kane	Elizabeth Craft & Sarah Fain	January 9, 2023	202	1.59
After Helene's mother passed, her fantasy has coming to the island in hopes of finding her biological father. At the same time that she arrives on the island a bachelor party arrives as well. As Helene explores her fantasy, she connects with members of the party while learning that none of them are her father. Roarke and Javier grow closer as Ruby encounters Isla during a midnight swim. It is later revealed that Javier is Helene's father.
13	3	"Paymer vs. Paymer"	Rachel Raimist	Jane Espenson	January 16, 2023	203	1.65
Dolly and Dutch come to the island where they fix their marriage. In the course of their fantasy, they forget they are married and remarry each other. Meanwhile, Helene and Ruby hang out as Javier opens up to Roarke about being a father.
14	4	"Mystery in Miami"	Diana Valentine	Karine Rosenthal	January 23, 2023	204	2.04
Three friends set off to find out what happened to an old friend in 1980's Miami. The day grows interesting as Roarke allows Ruby to spend the time off the island inside the women's fantasy. Meanwhile Roarke spends time with Segundo back on the island.
15	5	"The Urn"	Joel Novoa	Adam Belanoff	February 6, 2023	205	1.73
Roarke remembers her first guest, Joy Summers, as her grown children come to the island to scatter her ashes together. Unfortunately the children Frank, Ross, and Bridget don't get along resulting in them learning that the urn won't open until they do so. Frank resented how he was stuck taking care of their ill mother with no help. Bridget and her brother Frank resent their older brother while Ross gave Bridget a complex due to many of the things he said about her. Throughout their stay on the island, Elena remembers how Joy wanted to find her Joy, and somehow in her fantasy she saw her grown children as they return to the island.
16	6	"Forever & a Day"	Raúl Marchand	Drew Z. Greenberg	February 13, 2023	206	2.01
When Oliver's fantasy is to surprise his boyfriend Emilio with the perfect proposal, he relives the same day over and over again as Emilio says no. Meanwhile he isn't the only one on the island who is aware of the groundhog day effect as Roarke is set to celebrate Helene's birthday with Javier. Throughout it all, guest Dr. Nancy wanted to be challenged with new patients.
17	7	"#Happy"	Eduardo Sanchez	Adria Lang	February 20, 2023	207	1.94
After Roarke dumped Javier because of Helene, she pushes her focus on her guests. The Graham family come to enjoy a vacation with Amber's fantasy for her family to have them as happy as they look on social media. Unfortunately, she learns that it's not all it's cracked up to be when her family begins to act out of character. Meanwhile, guest Isaiah is handed an envelope denoting the day of his death, and struggles to open it.
18	8	"Walk a Country Mile"	Marie Jamora	Jane Espenson	March 6, 2023	208	1.98
When an overworked and blocked Country star and her assistant come to the island, Shay declares that she wants to be unknown so she could write a new song. This allows her assistant to get a chance at the spotlight. Meanwhile Javier learns more about Helene.
19	9	"Gwenivere of Glendale"	Gina Lamar	Brook Sitgraves Turner	April 10, 2023	209	1.55
When Gwen comes to the island, unsure about her life, she reveals that she wants to be a princess so as not to have to make any decisions for herself. However she learns that her fantasy isn't as grand as she thought when she is first introduced to a possible poisoning on the eve of meeting a prince that the king was going to marry her to. After realizing that the prince is bad news, she runs away with a knight named Lance. This culminates in her overcoming her issues and deciding to return to medical school, and even learns that Lance was a real person as he was another guest to the island, the two leaving the island together. Meanwhile Ruby begins to act strangely.
20	10	"War of the Roses (And the Hutchinsons)"	Diana Valentine	Lisa Quintela	April 17, 2023	210	1.69
When an older couple and their neighbors come to the island, they are surprised to learn that they were both on the island for their own fantasies. While the older couple with wife Vivan wanted to enjoy finally reading "Gone Girl" under a cut down tree from their backyard, Lou wanted to score a hole in one. The younger couple, Seth and Natalie, however wanted to forget the fact that they couldn't get pregnant. Upon learning that their neighbor was there, both vacations go sideways as they focus on the other. Meanwhile Javier and Roarke have a talk about being friends now.
21	11	"Peaches and the Jilted Bride"	Milan Cheylov	Adam Fierro	April 24, 2023	211	1.82
When Laura arrives on the island, freshly left at the altar, all she wants is to feel better. This results in her reconnecting with her childhood imaginary friend Peaches. Peaches takes it upon herself to first call Laura's parents to the island and then to later read aloud Laura's diary, giving Laura the courage to confront her parents about ruining her life. Meanwhile Isla returns and reconnects with Ruby, resulting in Ruby beginning to forget her life with Mel much to Roarke's fear.
22	12	"Girlboss, Interrupted"	Andi Armaganian	Adam Belanoff	May 1, 2023	212	1.54
23	13	"MJ Akuda & The 1st, 2nd, and 3rd Wives Club"	Aprill Winney	Sarah Fain	May 8, 2023	213	1.75
In the effort to stop Ruby from joining Isla, her daughter MJ Akuda is brought to the island by Roarke and told about her being alive by Segundo, Roarke, and Javier. Ruby is told to spend time with MJ before she could leave, resulting in MJ reminding her mother of when one of her sons almost drowned. As a result, she is able to break free from Isla's hypnosis just in time. Meanwhile the current and ex-wives of Gavin Beck all want revenge for the lies he has told over the years. Their shared fantasy has them receiving a voodoo doll that allows them to hurt the man. However after he refuses to change, Roarke intervenes and introduces Gavin to "the chair of tears" that had him feeling all of the tears that he caused. This results in him deciding to change. In the aftermath of Ruby staying on the island, Helene is brought back for Ruby's party as Javier and Roarke declare their love for each other.

== Production ==
=== Development ===
On December 15, 2020, it was announced that Fox had ordered a contemporary adaptation of Fantasy Island developed by Elizabeth Craft and Sarah Fain. The show is produced by Fox Entertainment, Happier in Hollywood and Sony Pictures Television's Gemstone Studios subsidiary. On September 8, 2021, it was reported that a second season is in negotiations. On November 4, 2021, Fox renewed the series for a second season. On May 9, 2023, it was announced that the series had been canceled after two seasons.

=== Casting ===
On April 21, 2021, Kiara Barnes had been cast in a regular role and John Gabriel Rodriquez had been cast in the recurring role. On April 27, 2021, Roselyn Sánchez was added to the cast as Elena Roarke. On May 5, 2021, it was announced that Bellamy Young would make a guest appearance in the show. On June 3, 2021, it was announced that Dave and Odette Annable would make a guest appearance in the show. On July 16, 2021, it was announced that Melrose Place stars Laura Leighton, Josie Bissett and Daphne Zuniga will make special guest appearances in the show.

On November 22, 2021, it was reported that Rodriquez had been promoted to a series regular for the second season. On April 25, 2022, Alexa Mansour had been cast in a recurring role. On January 11, 2023, it was announced that Teri Hatcher and James Denton are set to guest star for an episode.

=== Filming ===
Filming took place in Puerto Rico.

== Release ==
Fantasy Island premiered on Fox on August 10, 2021. On May 27, 2021, Fox released the first official trailer for the series. A behind-the-scenes special titled "Welcome to the New Fantasy Island" premiered on August 8, 2021, two days before the premiere. Upon the second season renewal, a two-hour holiday special episode titled "Welcome to the Snow Globe" was also announced. It aired on December 23, 2021. The second season premiered on January 2, 2023.

== Reception ==
=== Critical response ===
The review aggregator website Rotten Tomatoes reports a 67% approval rating with an average rating of 6.6/10, based on 12 critic reviews. The website's critics consensus reads, "Fantasy Island's flights of fancy aren't quite formed enough to make it a must-watch, but viewers looking for beautiful vistas and a bit of mystery could do worse." Metacritic, which uses a weighted average, assigned a score of 62 out of 100 based on 8 critics, indicating "generally favorable reviews".

=== Ratings ===
==== Special ====
Viewership and ratings per episode of Fantasy Island
No.	Title	Air date	Rating (18–49)	Viewers (millions)	DVR (18–49)	DVR viewers (millions)	Total (18–49)	Total viewers (millions)
—	"Welcome to the New Fantasy Island"	August 8, 2021	0.2	0.55	0.0	0.06	0.2	0.61

==== Season 1 ====
Viewership and ratings per episode of Fantasy Island
No.	Title	Air date	Rating (18–49)	Viewers (millions)	DVR (18–49)	DVR viewers (millions)	Total (18–49)	Total viewers (millions)
1	"Hungry Christine/Mel Loves Ruby"	August 10, 2021	0.4	2.05	0.1	1.12	0.5	3.17
2	"His and Hers/The Heartbreak Hotel"	August 17, 2021	0.3	1.72	0.2	1.40	0.5	3.12
3	"Quantum Entanglement"	August 24, 2021	0.3	1.60	TBD	TBD	TBD	TBD
4	"Once Upon a Time in Havana"	August 31, 2021	0.3	1.58	TBD	TBD	TBD	TBD
5	"Twice in a Lifetime"	September 7, 2021	0.2	1.45	TBD	TBD	TBD	TBD
6	"The Big Five Oh"	September 12, 2021	0.5	2.03	TBD	TBD	TBD	TBD
7	"The Romance & the Bromance"	September 14, 2021	0.3	1.24	TBD	TBD	TBD	TBD
8	"Día de los Vivos"	September 19, 2021	0.3	1.71	TBD	TBD	TBD	TBD
9–10	"Welcome to the Snow Globe, Part One / Welcome to the Snow Globe, Part Two"	December 23, 2021	0.3	1.81	TBD	TBD	TBD	TBD

==== Season 2 ====
Viewership and ratings per episode of Fantasy Island
No.	Title	Air date	Rating (18–49)	Viewers (millions)	DVR (18–49)	DVR viewers (millions)	Total (18–49)	Total viewers (millions)
1	"Tara and Jessica's High School Reunion / Cat Lady"	January 2, 2023	0.2	1.70	0.1	0.82	0.3	2.52
2	"Hurricane Helene / The Bachelor Party"	January 9, 2023	0.2	1.59	0.1	1.02	0.3	2.62
3	"Paymer Vs. Paymer"	January 16, 2023	0.2	1.65	0.1	1.01	0.3	2.66
4	"Mystery in Miami"	January 23, 2023	0.2	2.04	TBD	TBD	TBD	TBD
5	"The Urn"	February 6, 2023	0.2	1.73	TBD	TBD	TBD	TBD
6	"Forever & a Day"	February 13, 2023	0.2	2.01	TBD	TBD	TBD	TBD
7	"#Happy"	February 20, 2023	0.2	1.94	TBD	TBD	TBD	TBD
8	"Walk a Country Mile"	March 6, 2023	0.2	1.98	TBD	TBD	TBD	TBD
9	"Gwenivere of Glendale"	April 10, 2023	0.1	1.55	TBD	TBD	TBD	TBD
10	"War of the Roses (And the Hutchinsons)"	April 17, 2023	0.2	1.69	TBD	TBD	TBD	TBD
11	"Peaches and the Jilted Bride"	April 24, 2023	0.2	1.82	TBD	TBD	TBD	TBD
12	"Girlboss, Interrupted"	May 1, 2023	0.2	1.54	TBD	TBD	TBD	TBD
13	"MJ Akuda & The 1st, 2nd, and 3rd Wives Club"	May 8, 2023	0.2	1.75	TBD	TBD	TBD	TBD
