= James Harvey Ward =

American actor (born 1978)

- Born: July 31, 1978 (age 47); Greenville, North Carolina, U.S.
- Occupation: Actor
- Years active: 2006-present

James Harvey Ward (born July 31, 1978) is an American actor, most known for portraying Michael on AMC's Low Winter Sun, Felton Norris on HBO's True Blood and Madden on the MyNetworkTV limited-run serial Saints & Sinners. He is a lifetime member of the Actors Studio.

== Filmography ==
=== Film ===
Year	Title	Role	Notes
2009	Transformers: Revenge of the Fallen	Sonar Man	Uncredited
2009	Dying Days	Ezra	
2010	Darnell Dawkins: Mouth Guitar Legend	Danny Granger	
2012	The Dark Knight Rises	SWAT in Alley	
2014	Road to Paloma	Billy	
2014	10,000 Days	Lucas Beck	
2017	The Nth Ward	Kitch	
2018	Braven	Randal	

=== Television ===
Year	Title	Role	Notes
2006	Justice	Ed Gorman	Episode: "Shotgun"
2007	Heartland	Tyler Colton	Episode: "Mother & Child Reunion"
2007	Life	Devil Boy #2	Episode: "The Fallen Woman"
2007	Saints & Sinners	Madden	29 episodes
2008	Numbers	Joshua Quigley	Episode: "Black Swan"
2008	Sons of Anarchy	Russell Meineke	Episode: "AK-51"
2008	Entourage	Smoke Jumper #1	Episode: "Seth Green Day"
2009	Without a Trace	Patrick Gravich	Episode: "Devotion"
2010	NCIS: Los Angeles	Vic Stearnard	Episode: "Chinatown"
2010	No Ordinary Family	Omar	Episode: "No Ordinary Accident"
2010	The Vampire Diaries	Cody Webber	Episode: "The Sacrifice"
2010	CSI: Miami	Sam Novak	Episode: "Happy Birthday"
2010	10,000 Days	Lucas Beck	11 episodes
2010–2011	True Blood	Felton Norris	8 episodes
2011	Parks and Recreation	Jocky Guy	Episode: "Soulmates"
2011	CSI: Crime Scene Investigation	John Lee	Episode: "Tell-Tale Hearts"
2012	The Finder	Young Glen Hogan	Episode: "Bullets"
2012	Breakout Kings	Brody Ardell	2 episodes
2012	NCIS	Andre Fullerton	Episode: "Playing with Fire"
2013	Bones	Jason Wyler	Episode: "The Party in the Pants"
2013	Low Winter Sun	Michael	6 episodes
2015	Point of Honor	Cutler	Television film
2015	Hot Girl Walks By	Dr. Hamilton	Episode: "Visitors in a Hospital"
2016	Hawaii Five-0	Luke	Episode: "Umia Ka Hanu"
2016	Rosewood	Harley	Episode: "Half-Life & Havana Nights"
2016	Shooter	John Quince	Episode: "Danger Close"
2017	Madtown	Jimmy	Television film
2017, 2018	Agents of S.H.I.E.L.D.	Gunner	2 episodes
2019	Criminal Minds	Casey Allen Pinkner	Episode: "Truth or Dare"
2019	Castle Rock	Guard Jimmy	2 episodes
