= AK-51 =

- Sons of Anarchy episode
- Episode no.: Season 1 Episode 6
- Directed by: Seith Mann
- Written by: Nichole Beattie
- Cinematography by: Paul Maibaum
- Editing by: Jacques Gravett
- Production code: 1WAB05
- Original air date: October 8, 2008
- Running time: 45 minutes

Guest appearances
- Ally Walker as June Stahl; Ryan Hurst as Opie Winston; Theo Rossi as Juice Ortiz; William Lucking as Piney Winston; Taylor Sheridan as David Hale; Glenn Plummer as Vic Trammel; Dendrie Taylor as Luann Delaney; Tim De Zarn as Nate Meineke; James Harvey Ward as Russell Meineke; Taryn Manning as Cherry; Jay Karnes as Josh Kohn

Episode chronology
| ← Previous "Giving Back" | Next → "Old Bones" |

"AK-51" is the sixth episode of the first season of the FX television series Sons of Anarchy. It was written by Nichole Beattie, directed by Seith Mann and originally aired on October 8, 2008, in the United States.

This episode marks the first appearance of Agent June Stahl (Ally Walker).

== Plot ==
As a favor to his old war buddy Nate Meineke, Piney sells a number of AK-47 assault rifles to Meineke's right-wing militia. He heads out to the woods with Jax to meet Meineke and his son, Russell. After briefly testing the weapons out on targets, the militia buys the guns and head off. They then use the guns to ambush a prison convoy and free one of their members, Frank Cison. A shoot-out ensues, resulting in the deaths of a Charming police officer and two innocent bystanders. While fleeing, Meineke drops his cell phone at the scene, which is later found by ATF Agent June Stahl. She discovers that the phone's last call was from Clay's garage.

SAMCRO hears news of the jailbreak the following day. Juice returns from Indian Hills with the guns, and Cherry, in his truck. Clay tells Juice off for bringing Cherry to Charming, as he doesn't want a woman that he recently slept with near his wife. However, Juice tells him that she only wants to see Half-Sack. Gemma deduces from Clay's angry reaction to Cherry that they slept together while on the road. She then laments the situation in a conversation with Luann, saying "What happens on a run stays on a run. It does not show up and slap me in the goddamn face!."

Shortly after, law enforcement raid the clubhouse and arrest Clay for aiding and abetting a triple homicide. At the police station, Stahl tells Clay that she knows that SAMCRO supplied the guns used in the jailbreak and will soon have a warrant to search the club's garage, where weapons are being stored. Back at the clubhouse, Piney admits that he made a mistake in selling the guns, and he only did it because Meineke is a friend. After pressing a reluctant Sheriff Trammel for information, Jax learns that the ATF will be back with a search warrant and tells the others that they will have to get rid of the guns from the garage.

Later, Meineke contacts Piney again and sets up a meeting at the militia's woodland hideout. The Sons agree that they will have to kill the militia to stop them from informing on SAMCRO if they are apprehended. The meeting is set up for the following day. In the meantime, with a search of their property imminent, SAMCRO must get the remaining guns to the One-Niners as soon as possible. They load up a septic truck with the guns and drive it away under the noses of an ATF stakeout. When the ATF searches the garage, they find nothing. However, the Sons' celebrations are short-lived when they learn that Laroy no longer wants to buy the guns.

As Gemma is walking down the street in Charming, she notices Cherry approaching in the opposite direction. In a fit of rage, she takes a teenager's skateboard, hits Cherry in the face with it and is subsequently arrested. While being questioned by Hale, Clay notices Gemma being brought in for booking and learns that she was arrested for assault. Clay and Gemma then engage in a heated airing of their dirty laundry as they argue over the issues involving Cherry in front of the ATF and police. Clay is subsequently released and heads to the holding cell to talk to Gemma. They reconcile, but Gemma refuses to post bail, explaining that she needs a night in jail to get herself together as she is struggling with the changes caused by menopause.

The following morning, Jax, Piney and Opie set out to meet Meineke in the forest. Meineke tells them that he and his men are fleeing to Mexico and want to buy more guns from SAMCRO. The Sons sell them bags of grain, supposedly containing the rifles but actually filled with explosives, which they then load into their trucks. Once the deal is done, Piney hugs Meineke one last time. As they drive away, Opie detonates the explosives, killing all of the militia. Clay picks up Gemma from jail and as they prepare to head home, they spot Cherry walking by. Gemma and Cherry settle their differences as Cherry explains that she is only in town to pursue a relationship with Half-Sack and will immediately leave town if that does not work out.

== Reception ==
In a review, Zach Handler of The AV Club gave "AK-51" an A−, stating; "Sons Of Anarchy is living up to potential and then some; with the increasingly creepy Kohn running around, along with the promise of greater pressure from the law and the tensions pulling at Jax, I can't wait to see what happens next."

In another review, NJ.com said: "'Sons of Anarchy' continues to get stronger as it goes along. This episode held up a welcome magnifying glass to Gemma and Clay's relationship (giving Katey Sagal and Ron Perlman a deserved showcase), as well as to more details about MC culture. (The sin wasn't so much that Clay cheated on Gemma, but that the girl then showed her face in Charming. Noted.)"
