= The Descent (The Vampire Diaries) =

- The Vampire Diaries episode
- Episode no.: Season 2 Episode 12
- Directed by: Marcos Siega
- Written by: Elizabeth Craft; Sarah Fain
- Cinematography by: Paul M. Sommers
- Editing by: Lance Anderson
- Production code: 2J5262
- Original air date: January 27, 2011

Guest appearances
- Lauren Cohan as Rose; Michaela McManus as Jules; Marguerite MacIntyre as Liz Forbes; Ahna O'Reilly as Jessica Cohen

Episode chronology
← Previous "By the Light of the Moon"	Next → "Daddy Issues"
- The Vampire Diaries season 2

"The Descent" is the twelfth episode of the second season of the American supernatural teen drama television series The Vampire Diaries, and the 34th of the series. It aired on The CW on January 27, 2011. The episode was written by consulting producers Elizabeth Craft and Sarah Fain, and directed by co-executive producer Marcos Siega.

== Plot ==
The episode starts with Jules (Michaela McManus) waking up in the woods next to a camp after the full moon night when she attacked Damon (Ian Somerhalder) and bit Rose (Lauren Cohan). She is surrounded by dead campers who she attacked the previous night and she starts trying to cover her tracks when an officer arrives and asks if she is fine. Jules pretends she is crying and that her friends were attacked by a wolf but when the officer goes to call some help, Jules kills him before he does it.

Stefan (Paul Wesley) tells Elena (Nina Dobrev) that he wants to find Isobel so he can ask her about Elijah and he plans to ask Katherine where he can find her. Elena does not agree with his plan and reminds him that she made a deal with Elijah so no one get hurt. Stefan reminds her that she was the one who made the deal and not him and leaves to find Alaric (Matt Davis) at the Grill where Stefan asks his help to find Isobel. Alaric gives him a former phone number of Isobel's and Stefan starts searching for her.

Rose is at the Salvatore house and she is getting worse after the werewolf bite. Damon tries to convince her that everything will be fine and he will find a way to cure her but he knows that this will be difficult. He leaves Elena to take care of her while he goes to the Grill to meet Jules and ask her to tell him how to help Rose. Jules though tells him that the only way to end Rose's suffering is by killing her.

Back at home, Rose starts having hallucinations and she thinks Elena is Katherine and attacks her. The first time the hallucination stops and Rose realizes that it's Elena so she stops before hurting her. The second time Elena has to run and hide from her to save herself. Between the two attacks, Rose tells Elena how much she misses being human and the place she was grown up. After the second attack, Rose leaves the house and goes to the local high school where she attacks a man and kills him and later two teenagers. Damon arrives and helps her get back home.

Meanwhile, Tyler (Michael Trevino) thanks Caroline (Candice Accola) for helping him through his first transformation. Caroline confess to him that a werewolf bite is fatal for a vampire and that makes him asking why would she stay if she knew that but before Caroline answers Matt (Zach Roerig) interrupts them. Tyler leaves them alone and Matt tries to tell Caroline he wants them to get back together and kisses her. Caroline does not want them to be together because she does not want to hurt Matt, but instead of telling him why she says that they cannot and she leaves.

Caroline gets back home where she finds Tyler waiting for her and insists on his question of why she would stay with him and risk her life. Caroline says that she only cares and she did not want him to be alone but he still cannot understand her. Tyler kisses her as well but Caroline leaves him alone, as she did with Matt, and gets into the house.

Back at the Salvatore house, Damon is alone with Rose. Rose is hurting really bad and begs Damon to make it stop. Damon gets into her mind to control her dreams to make her feel better. Rose dreams that she is at her hometown and Damon is there with her. She is not afraid or suffer anymore and she is ready to meet her family again and Trevor. Off the dream, Damon takes a stake and stabs Rose in the heart killing her as a mercy to her pain, crying while he does it.

Elena tries to comfort Damon who insists he does not care about Rose's death but he finally admits that he does not like to feel because it hurts. He asks her to go home and leave him alone, Elena hugs him and leaves. Damon is lost after everything that happened that he decides to go out and attack an innocent girl named Jessica (Ahna O'Reilly) after admitting to her that he misses being human. Jessica tries to get away but Damon catches her and feeds on her.

Jules meets Tyler and tells him that Mason (Taylor Kinney) is dead and that Caroline and her vampire friends killed him. She also tells him that Caroline lied to him about being the only vampire in town but Tyler does not want to believe her. Meanwhile, Elena gets back home where she finds Stefan waiting for her. He tells her that he called Isobel and did not find her but he found instead someone else to help them; uncle John (David Anders).

== Feature music ==
In "The Descent" we can hear the songs:

- "DLZ" by TV on the Radio
- "I Like It A Lot" by Death Ships
- "Country Lane" by Telekinesis
- "Take Me to the Riot" by Stars
- "The Mall & Misery" by Broken Bells
- "The Last Time" by The Daylights
- "Impossible" by Anberlin

== Reception ==
=== Ratings ===
In its original American broadcast, "The Descent" was watched by 3.55 million; up by 0.39 from the previous episode.

=== Reviews ===
"The Descent" received positive reviews.

Eric Goldman of IGN rated the episode with 9.5/10 saying that it was one of his favorite episodes of the series yet. Goldman praised Lauren Cohan's acting and also commented on the human side of Damon we've seen on this episode. "Kudos to Lauren Cohan, who was in many ways the star of the show this week and gave one hell of a performance, showing the varied and extreme emotional states Rose found herself in. [...] If they were going to show Damon Salvatore actually cry, this was certainly the episode to do it."

Matt Richenthal from TV Fanatic rated the episode with 4.5/5. "Overall, one might criticize the episode for focusing too much on Rose, a character we haven't known for very long. But I see it differently. The extended death scene and the pain she was in as a result of the werewolf bite was necessary in order to depict the stakes that are on the horizon during the impending werewolf/vampire war."

E. Reagan of The TV Chick gave the episode an A rating saying that it was an awesome episode and a fine start to the second half of the season while Carrie Raisler from The A.V. Club gave the episode a B+ rating saying: "Overall, this was a strong episode, emotionally driven by Ian Somerhalder’s heartbreaking performance. Despite my previous insistence that brooding wasn’t allowed here on The Vampire Diaries, I think brooding is coming. And I kind of think the brooding might be fantastic."

Robin Franson Pruter from Forced Viewing rated the episode with 3/4 saying that it was not a bad episode, but it was a frustrating one because it was easy to see where a few tweaks here and there could have made for an excellent episode. About the story focusing on Rose's death, Franson Pruter commented: "The episode should have focused on the impact of Rose’s death on Damon, the only character who has any sort of relationship with Rose and would be affected by her death. Yes, the episode covers that, but it doesn’t focus on it. These kinds of focus issues require truly advanced writing skills, and I can’t fault the writers too much for not getting the fine-tuning right."

Josie Kafka of Doux Reviews rated the episode with 4/4 saying that despite the focusing on Rose's death, this was not her episode, but it was Damon's. "Ian Somerhalder has been consistently great in this show, but rarely has Damon had the opportunity to have an honest and simple emotion as he did with his psychoanalyst-cum-victim. He did such a wonderful job. I cried. And then I cried some more."
