= Bass Ackwards and Belly Up =

2006 young adult novel by Elizabeth Craft and Sarah Fain

- Author: Elizabeth Craft and Sarah Fain
- Language: English
- Genre: Young adult fiction
- Publisher: Little, Brown (New York)
- Publication date: May 2006
- Publication place: United States
- Media type: Print (Hardcover)
- Pages: 416 pp.
- ISBN: 0-316-05793-2
- OCLC: 62172613
- LC Class: PZ7.C84318 Bas 2006

Bass Ackwards and Belly Up is a young adult novel by Elizabeth Craft and Sarah Fain, published by Little, Brown in May 2006. The novel is the first by Craft and Fain, better known as writers and co-producers for the television show The Shield. They shared the writing duties with Craft writing the characters of Harper and Sophie and Fain writing the characters of Kate and Becca. The novel was nominated for a Borders Original Voices Award in 2006, in the Intermediate/Young Adult Books category.

The novel is about chasing dreams. The story starts in Boulder, Colorado with four best friends — Harper Waddle, Sophie Bushell, Becca Winsberg, and Kate Foster — who have finished high school and are supposed to be going to college. Kate's 14-year-old sister, Habiba (usually called "Beebs"), who was adopted from Ethiopia, is also a big part of the story. Harper is rejected from NYU but is too ashamed of herself to tell her friends. She lies and tells them she rejected NYU and is going to pursue her dream of writing the next Great American Novel. Sophie and Kate decide they have their own dreams: becoming an actress and finding her dream, respectively. They decide to bail on college, following Harper's example. Becca decides to go to college, to pursue her dream of falling in love.

== Harper's story ==
Stuck at home trying to write a novel, Harper comes across her favorite high school teacher, her English teacher, Mr. Adam Finelli, whom she had always had a crush on, at her job at a local café. She tells him about her writing, and he tries to help her. She is discouraged when she finds out he has a girlfriend, but she breaks up with him. Adam invites Harper to his apartment to talk about her book, but they end up kissing. She, at first, thinks he thought it was weird. But when they meet again, he kisses her, telling her he had wanted to since the night they met at his apartment. Harper, however, tells him she won't kiss him again until she finishes her book. She then uses her experience with him to start writing 51 pages of a first draft. He tells her it is good for a first draft but lackluster. The book ends with her not finishing the novel. She burns her first draft and tells herself to start over.

== Sophie's story ==
Sophie goes to Los Angeles to become an actress, staying at a wealthy family friends' guest house. She becomes friends with her hostess's pool guy, Sam, who she thinks is very attractive. Her hostess's housekeeper gets her an extra role in a movie. When at a party Sam took her to, she bumps into famous actor, Trey Benson, and finds out he is starring in the movie she is in. They start to date and, although he treats her without respect, he pretends to be a complete gentleman after Sophie confronts him. He gets her movie and commercial auditions with his many connections. When Trey stops calling, she is mortified. He calms her down by telling her she can spend her holidays in his family's house in Aspen. She finds a tabloid with a picture of Trey kissing another girl, his costar. She goes back to L.A. to be with Sam, and they exchange gifts. She gives him a framed copy of one of his playbills.

== Kate's story ==
After abandoning her parents' wishes of going to Harvard, Kate follows in her two friends' footsteps. Instead of pursuing her dream, she is searching for it. She gets a cheap plane ticket to Paris and says goodbye to her boyfriend, Jared. He breaks up with her but tells her they're just "taking a break". Before she left, Harper, Sophie, Becca, and Habiba gave her a list of things to do in Paris and all over Europe. The list was basically dares, and the initials of each dare's writers was next to each one. She decides to do #76: Talk to the ugly guy. She meets Magnus, who she falls in love with, and decides he isn't so ugly after all. She falls asleep in his arms, but leaves the next day, leaving behind contact information. They find each other again and they finish everything on her list of dares together but have to say goodbye when he has to leave for Stockholm University.

== Becca's story ==
The only girl in the foursome who decides to go to college, Becca's dream is to fall in love. But she also loves to ski and joins Middlebury College's ski team, with Coach Maddix, who is not very fond of her. She makes friends with a girl from New York named Isabelle, who prides herself in knowing a lot about Becca's friends. One day at a party, she gets too drunk. She goes around the party screaming "I'm on fi-ya!! I'm on fi-ya!" and blacks out. A guy she has a crush on, Stuart, carries Isabelle to the nurse, where she tells her everything that happened that night. Stuart and Becca start to date after that. Over Thanksgiving break at Isabelle's house on Park Avenue, they go to a party where Becca bumps into Kate's ex-boyfriend, Jared, who she has loved even before Kate went out with him. They kiss and end up sleeping together. Soon, she realizes what a big mistake it was and only tells Harper. When Stuart finds out, he is furious and stops talking to Becca. But after an extremely long explanation, they end up making up.

== Sequel ==
The sequel to Bass Ackwards and Belly Up, Footfree and Fancyloose, was released April 1, 2009. It picks up half a year after the novel ends.
