= Goldhawks =

- Origin: London, England
- Genres: Rock
- Years active: 2009–2011
- Labels: Mercury Records

Goldhawks were a rock band from London, England.

== History ==
Goldhawks's name is taken from the Goldhawk Road near Shepherd's Bush in West London. The vocalist and guitarist are brothers.

Frontman Bobby Cook had initially started a career as a solo singer-songwriter, releasing the singles "Gone So Far", "Deja Vu", and "Homesick" in 2007, on Dance to the Radio record label and playing with Laura Marling, Noah and the Whale, and Jamie T before forming the band. The band's debut, Trick of Light, arrived on Mercury Records late in 2010. The group spent part of Autumn 2010 touring Germany. and in January 2011, announced that they would be releasing their debut album in March. Having released Trick of the Light in March 2011, the band released Keep The Fire EP through iTunes 3 April 2011 consisting of 5 mixes of the track. There have been no further releases; the band's Facebook page has had no updates since 2011 and their website is defunct.

== Members ==
- Bobby Cook – vocals
- Jack Cook – guitar
- Colin Straton – bass
- Graham Smith – drums
- Nick Mills – keyboards

== Discography ==
- Trick of Light (Mercury Records, 2010)
- Keep The Fire EP (Mercury Records, 2011)
