= Team Albanians =

US-based nonprofit organization

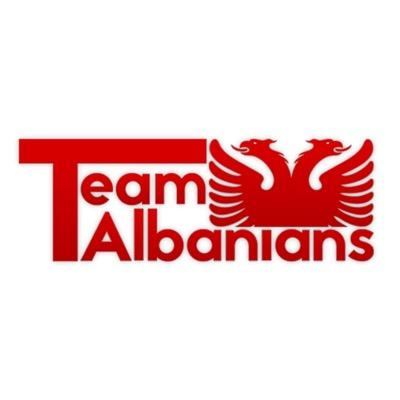
- Founded: 2016
- Founder: Deni Hoxha
- Purpose: Tourism, Albanian diaspora
- Location: Worcester, Massachusetts
- Region served: United States, Europe, Latin America, Africa, Asia, International
- Employees: 5
- Website: teamalbanians.com

Team Albanians, also known as TeamAlbanians, is a United States–based nonprofit organization aiming to promote Albanian culture and tourism and to connect with the Albanian diaspora.

== About ==
The organization's aim is to promote the natural, artistic, historical and cultural values of Albania mainly in the digital community. The organization also works in connecting the Albanian diaspora, by organizing events or helping with the organization of events such as the Albanian Festival in Worcester, Massachusetts; sharing success stories from the diaspora; and providing opportunities such as giveaways. Eliza Dushku's documentary Dear Albania is managed by the organization. The Oscar-nominated film Shok is also managed by Team Albanians.

== Campaigns ==
Team Albanians has managed and/or helped with the management of the marketing campaigns for the following:

- Shok (film)
- KosovoInUNESCO (initiative)
- Dear Albania (documentary)
- Cash Only (film)
- Battle in the Balkans (film)
