= List of Tru Calling characters =

This is a list of the main characters in the television series Tru Calling. Tru Calling is an American supernatural drama television series.

== Tru Davies ==
Tru Davies
- Tru Davies
- First appearance: Pilot
- Last appearance: 'Twas the Night Before Christmas... Again
- Created by: John Hardmon Feldman
- Portrayed by: Eliza Dushku

In-universe information
- Occupation: Morgue worker
- Relatives: Harrison Davies, Meredith Davies, Richard Davies, Jordan Davies, Claire Davies, Oliver Davies

Tru Davies is the show's main character, portrayed by Eliza Dushku.

=== Childhood ===
At the age of only 12 years old, Tru witnessed the murder of her mother, Elise Davies. Later in the series, it is revealed that Carl Neesan (Wade Williams), the hitman who killed her, was hired by Tru's father Richard. After her mother's demise, Tru, her younger brother Harrison and older sister Meredith were abandoned by their father and little has been revealed about who raised them from that point on.

=== Supernatural power ===
Tru possesses the power to relive the current day when a corpse asks for her help in order to save their life, or to help someone whom the person affected in some way. Mostly triumphant, Tru has on occasion been unsuccessful in saving lives, sometimes because of the interference of Jack Harper and sometimes because the person was not meant to live. On some occasions her power manifested differently. In one episode, a group of five corpses all asked for her help at the same time. Other times, her day rewound more than once during a rewind day, as in "The Longest Day" and "Grace". In "The Last Good Day", when a dead woman asked Jack Harper for help, Tru finally experienced what Jack does when a corpse asks her for help. She described this as a dark feeling that she would never want to experience again.

=== Good vs. evil ===
Although both can relive days, it has never been said who is evil, Tru or Jack. Jack has always been portrayed as evil, which Jack denies, although at certain times Jack has broken the rules of preserving fate, such as causing Luc's death to teach Tru a lesson.

While Tru claims that she is saving people who were taken before their time, Jack claims that he is merely preserving fate, and that if Tru saves someone who is meant to die, she creates a ripple effect in fate.

=== Romantic relationships ===
- Mark Evans – Tru's college professor. After Tru spotted Mark cheating on her with another one of his students, she ended the relationship. When Tru had a party, Mark visited, only to be killed by one of Tru's friends. Tru then saved his life after he asked her for help, and they both had closure in their relationship.
- Nick Kelly – A firefighter that was killed in a fire, then asked Tru for help. He was killed again in the same fire on his and Tru's first day together, though he did save a little girl who had originally died with him the first time.
- Luc Johnston – Luc is the crime scene photographer that works with Tru. Tru and Luc started dating and fell in love. However, Luc always questioned why Tru would take off at a moment's notice, eventually breaking up with her as he felt she was hiding something from him. When Tru finally revealed the truth to him, he refused to believe it. Jack then tricked him into going to visit a woman who would "provide clearer answers" and proof of Tru's abilities. Luc was instead shot and killed by the woman's jealous husband, who mistook Luc for his wife's supposed lover.
- Jensen Ritchie – Tru's college mate in med school, who was in a serious relationship when they first met. After he breaks up with his girlfriend, he and Tru spend a day together and end up kissing outside her apartment. He is then killed in an antique store robbery where he was buying an old medic case for Tru. When he is brought to the morgue, he doesn't ask for help – but later in the day, a different man who was killed asks for Tru's help. On the rewind day, Tru saves Jensen from being hit by a car driven by the very same victim she had to save that day. Davis and Jack warn her that there is a reason that Jensen did not ask for help – that it is his fate to die in the robbery, and that her changing fate will have consequences. Those consequences are never shown, as the show was cancelled abruptly. According to the writers, because of his near-death experience, he starts to become fascinated by death, which leads to him becoming a serial killer.

== Davis ==
Davis
- First appearance: Pilot
- Last appearance: 'Twas the Night Before Christmas... Again
- Portrayed by: Zach Galifianakis

In-universe information
- Occupation: Morgue worker
- Spouse: Haley (deceased)

Davis is Tru's supervisor, friend, and confidante at the morgue. Years ago, Tru's mother tried to warn him of a car accident that was about to happen. He didn't heed the warning, but Tru's mother flattened his car's tires, thus saving his life, but was unable to save his spouse. Spending years living in regret and guilt, he now acts as a mentor to Tru. He is a fan of Dungeons & Dragons and has been in a relationship with Dr. Carrie Allen who, unbeknownst to Davis, is a mole working for Jack Harper. In season 1, it is revealed that Davis is his middle name, although his first and last names remain unknown.

== Harrison Davies ==
Harrison Davies
- First appearance: Pilot
- Last appearance: 'Twas the Night Before Christmas... Again
- Portrayed by: Shawn Reaves

In-universe information
- Relatives: Tru Davies, Meredith Davies, Richard Davies, Jordan Davies, Claire Davies, Oliver Davies

Harrison Davies is Tru's younger brother. He and Lindsay dated for a short time; she broke it off and married an old flame at the end of season 1. In the season 1 finale "Two Weddings and a Funeral", Harrison is shot and killed by the jealous ex-husband of a woman he had just met. His corpse asks Tru for help, but Jack warns her that saving him will cause someone else to die in his place. At the end of the episode, Jack's manipulations cause Luc to get shot instead of Harrison. In season two, Harrison works for his father's law firm. His father implies that he has plans for him, but with the show canceled this was never resolved.

== Jack Harper ==
Jack Harper
- First appearance: Daddy's Girl
- Last appearance: 'Twas the Night Before Christmas... Again
- Portrayed by: Jason Priestley

Jack Harper, a counterpart to Tru's character, is introduced mid-first season as a foil and possible love interest. He is there to make sure fate gets its way, and introduces a philosophical aspect to Tru's endeavors: should she be saving the lives of people who may have been intended to die? Years before, he worked as a paramedic. While trying to save a child during a neighborhood shootout, he was shot in the back and was physically dead for minutes until being revived by his co-worker. At some point after that, Jack finds himself reliving days and admits himself to a psych ward, believing that he's gone insane after his near-death experience, until he is approached by Tru's father. In season one, after Tru prevents the death of her brother, Jack sends Tru's boyfriend Luc to die in his place. In the second season, Tru and Jack compete to get to someone first — her to save them, and him to restore the order of fate, and maintain what he believes to be the balance of the universe. Sometimes Tru wins and sometimes Jack does. However, when someone asks Jack for help instead of Tru, he is unsure whether he is supposed to make sure she dies, or save her. He finds out she has cancer and will die regardless, and that she only wants to have one final good day before she kills herself, in order for her sister to get insurance money. Tru convinces her to postpone that plan, and try to have many more good days first. She decides to do that, and she and Jack go to where she'd died before, a tower she'd jumped from, but this time only so that she can enjoy the view. Jack makes sure she goes over the ledge, but he grabs her hand, and she begs for him to pull her up. In the end, he lets go and she falls to her death. Tru arrives just in time to watch her fall, and she tells Jack, "I wish it were you." Jack walks away, saying, "That makes two of us."

== Lindsay Walker ==
Lindsay Walker
- First appearance: Pilot
- Last appearance: Two Weddings and a Funeral
- Portrayed by: A. J. Cook

Lindsay Walker is Tru's best friend in season one. Lindsay and Harrison used to date, but Lindsay broke it off and married an old flame. It is assumed that she followed her husband to London after the season one finale; she is not mentioned again.

== Luc Johnston ==
Luc Johnston
- First appearance: Past Tense
- Last appearance: Two Weddings and a Funeral
- Portrayed by: Matt Bomer

In-universe information
- Occupation: Photographer

Luc Johnston was a photographer and Tru's season one love interest. Luc broke things off with Tru over her constant unexplained disappearances and strange behavior. In the season 1 finale, Tru rewinds the day to save her brother from being shot. Luc tries to give her a second chance, but storms off confused and angry when she tries to tell him the truth about her powers. Jack claims that some woman can prove Tru's story, and manipulates Luc into going to her house carrying flowers, causing her ex to shoot him instead of Harrison. He does not ask for help and is buried.

== Meredith Davies ==
Meredith Davies
- First appearance: Pilot
- Last appearance: Daddy's Girl
- Portrayed by: Jessica Collins

In-universe information
- Occupation: Lawyer
- Relatives: Harrison Davies, Tru Davies, Richard Davies, Jordan Davies, Claire Davies, Oliver Davies

Meredith Davies is Tru's sister. She has a drug problem and is in rehab. She is not seen after the first half of season one.

== Gardez ==
Gardez
- First appearance: Pilot
- Last appearance: Closure
- Portrayed by: Benjamin Benitez

In-universe information
- Occupation: Morgue worker

Gardez formerly worked at the morgue and is played by Benjamin Benitez.

== Richard Davies ==
Richard Davies
- First appearance: Daddy's Girl
- Last appearance: 'Twas the Night Before Christmas... Again
- Portrayed by: Cotter Smith

In-universe information
- Occupation: Lawyer
- Spouses: Jordan; Elise (deceased)
- Children: Harrison Davies, Meredith Davies, Tru Davies, Claire Davies, Oliver Davies

Richard Davies is father to Tru, Harrison, and Meredith. He formerly had the same "gift" that Jack Harper now does, and had their mother killed because of it by hiring hitman Carl Neesan (Wade Williams). Jack Harper works for him, and they share the same ideology. He is credited as Special Guest Star in season two.

== Carrie Allen ==
Carrie Allen
- First appearance: Perfect Storm
- Last appearance: 'Twas the Night Before Christmas... Again
- Portrayed by: Liz Vassey

Dr. Carrie Allen is Davis' second season love interest. Unbeknownst to Davis, she works as a mole for Jack. In the final episode, it is hinted that she knew of Tru's secrets. She is credited as a special guest star. Had the series continued, the character would have developed real feelings for Davis as is hinted in the finale. However, he would discover that she had killed her violent and abusive husband, and it would then be his dilemma whether to turn her in or not.

== Jensen Ritchie ==
Jensen Ritchie
- First appearance: Grace
- Last appearance: 'Twas the Night Before Christmas... Again
- Portrayed by: Eric Christian Olsen

In-universe information
- Spouses: Engaged to Lexi, but broke it off

Jensen Ritchie is Tru's second season love interest. In "Enough", he is shot and killed and does not ask for help. Tru manages to find someone else who asks for help, she gets to save Jensen on her rewind day. However, Tru is just beginning to learn of the consequences of saving someone who does not ask for help. According to online remarks made by the writers, if the second season had continued, Jensen would eventually have become so fascinated with mortality as a result of his near-death experience that he would become a serial killer. Eventually, Tru would have to ask Jack for his help to kill him, letting him die as he was supposed to. Jensen is also credited as a Special Guest Star in season two.

Jensen Ackles was the producers' first choice to play Tru's love interest in the second season. He turned down the role, but the character's name was changed to Jensen because the producers liked Ackles' name.

== Avery Bishop ==
Avery Bishop
- First appearance: Grace
- Last appearance: 'Twas the Night Before Christmas... Again
- Portrayed by: Lizzy Caplan

Avery Bishop is one of Tru's medical school friends. She reveals that she and Jensen used to date, but now they are really close friends and simply look out for each other. She is the first to discover that Jensen's fiancé is a fake.

== Tyler Li ==
Tyler Li
- First appearance: Grace
- Last appearance: 'Twas the Night Before Christmas... Again
- Portrayed by: Parry Shen

In-universe information
- Nickname: Ty

Tyler Li is another one of Tru's medical school friends.
