= Shok =

Shok may refer to:

- Shok, Afghanistan Battle of Shok Valley
- Shok (film), 2015 Kosovar short film
- Shoks, snack food Hula Hoops
- Le Shok, American band
