= Shawn Reaves =

American actor (born 1978)

- Born: February 5, 1978 (age 47); Monroe, Louisiana

Shawn Reaves (born February 5, 1978) is an American actor. He is known for the role of Harrison Davies, the brother of the main character Tru Davies, on the Fox television series Tru Calling.

Reaves was born in Monroe, Louisiana. He studied acting in New York City at the Lee Strasberg Theater Institute and was coached privately by Harold Guskin. He is currently living in Los Angeles.

== Filmography ==
=== Film ===
- Things Behind the Sun (2001) as Tex
- Auto Focus (2002) as Bob Crane Jr. at 20
- Dandelion (2004) as Arlee
- 8 Ball (2008) as Vincent
- Shadowheart (2009) as Johny Cooper

=== Television ===
- Tru Calling (2003–2005) as Harrison Davies
- Law & Order: Special Victims Unit (2006) as Daniel Hunter
- CSI: Miami (2007) as Louis Sullivan
- Life (2007) as Eddie
- Sanctuary (2009)
- Almost Human (2013)

== Studies ==
He studied acting in New York at the Lee Strasberg Theatre Institute and worked one on one with Harold Guskin. He has also studied with Lesley Kahn in Los Angeles and is a graduate of The Actors Circle, formerly Center Stage LA.
