= Nate Dushku =

American actor and producer

- Born: Nathaniel Mark Dushku; June 8, 1977 (age 49); Boston, Massachusetts, U.S.
- Occupations: Actor, film director
- Years active: 2000–present
- Spouse: Amnon (Ami) Lourie
- Mother: Judy Dushku
- Relatives: Eliza Dushku (sister)

Nathaniel Mark Dushku (/ˈdʊʃkuː/; born June 8, 1977) is an American director, producer, and actor. He is the son of Judy Dushku and the youngest of the three elder brothers of actress Eliza Dushku.

== Early life ==
Dushku was born in Boston, Massachusetts, the third son of Philip Dushku, an administrator and teacher in the Boston Public Schools, and Judith "Judy" Dushku (née Rasmussen), a political science professor at Suffolk University in Boston. Dushku's father was Boston-born, of Albanian heritage, with his parents coming from the city of Korçë, and his mother, from Idaho, is of Danish, English, Irish and German descent. His parents were divorced in 1980.

Dushku's mother is a member of the Church of Jesus Christ of Latter-day Saints (LDS Church), and the children – Nathaniel, two older brothers, Aaron and Benjamin, and one younger sister, Eliza, who started professional acting at age 10 – were raised as Mormons, although Nate, Aaron and their sister, at least, later parted from the LDS Church.

Dushku is openly gay and married to restaurateur turned scriptwriter and film producer Amnon (Ami) Meyer Lourie, from New York.

== Career ==
=== Acting ===
Dushku began his acting career with the teen / student drama Undressed and the J. J. Abrams college drama Felicity.

=== Production and direction ===
Dushku and his sister produced a film, Dear Albania, about a visit to their father's ancestral home in southern Albania.

Nate and Eliza Dushku also worked on the feature film Mapplethorpe for over 12 years, eventually producing it with writer/director Ondi Timoner. Starring Matt Smith, it premiered and won an Audience Award at the Tribeca Film Festival in 2018.

== Filmography ==
Year	Title	Role	Notes
2000	Undressed	Milo	3 episodes (as Nathaniel Dushku)
2000	Felicity	Reims	2 episodes
2001	Antitrust	Brian Bissel	
2001	Wolf Girl	Whiffer	TV movie
2001	Geri Body Yoga		Video
2002	Fun with Benny	Bennie	Short
2002	Vampire Clan	Tony	
2002	Reality Check	Gar	
2003	My Dinner with Jimi	George Harrison	
2003	Angel	Armed Robber (uncredited)	Episode: "Orpheus"
2003	Learning Curves	Phil	
2003	Joan of Arcadia	Clay Fisher	Episode: "Just Say No"
2003, 2005	Tru Calling	Marty / Marty the Party Monster (uncredited)	2 episodes
2005	The Zodiac	Scott Washington	
2006	Kiss Me Again	Student #2	
2006	The Last Supper	Quoting Phillip	
2008	The Alphabet Killer	Tim	
2009	Blood Night: The Legend of Mary Hatchet	Alex	
2010	Dollhouse	Clive Ambrose	Episode: "Epitaph Two: Return"
2012	Art = (Love)2	Dean D'Agostino	
2015	Dear Albania	Director	with his sister
2015	Confessions of a Bartender	Customer	2 episodes
2016	Stalled	Aaron Day	
