= Marius A. Markevičius =

Marius A. Markevičius (born September 3, 1976) is a director of films and music videos. His films include The Other Dream Team a 2012 film about the Lithuanian national basketball team and their journey to a bronze medal in the 1992 Olympics. He directed the 2006 short film The Last Supper about the Last Supper. He directed the 2018 drama film Ashes in the Snow about a young Lithuanian deported to the Soviet gulag. As of 2019, it was the highest grossing film ever in Lithuania, exceeding the take for James Cameron's Avatar in Lithuania.

He was born in born in Santa Monica, California. He is Lithuanian American. He graduated with a BS degree from the University of California Berkeley in 1998. He graduated from the Haas School of Business's undergraduate program and MFA from UCLA School of Theater, Film and Television.

== Films ==
He helped make the films Douchebag and Like Crazy. He helped produce Like Crazy, about a long-distance romance.

He made the film Thug Rose: Mixed Martial Artist about a Lithuanian MMA fighter.

The Last Supper is a 2006 American short comedy film about the Biblical Last Supper, depicted as having occurred at a contemporary nightclub. The film was directed by Marius A. Markevicius and stars Chip Bent, Michael Bortone, Eliza Dushku, Andrew Davoli and Isaiah Mustafa.

The Last Supper premiered in September 2006 at the San Diego Film Festival.

=== Cast ===
- Chip Bent as JC
- Michael Bortone as Judas
- Isaiah Mustafa as Moses
- Eliza Dushku as Waitress
- Ryan Krause as Lazarus
- Seth Garfunkel as Parental Peter
- Chris Andrew Giulla as Assuming Andrew
- Brad Pennington as Curious James
- Dave Power as Loud Guy John
- Nate Dushku as Quoting Philip
- Andrew Davoli as Metro Bartholomew
- Wyatt Russell as Doubting Thomas
- Luke Franco as Pent Up Matthew
- Jason Markarian as Instigating James
- Sebastian Hinton as Insecure Thaddaeas
- Paul Rae as Simon
