= The Other Dream Team =

2012 film by Marius A. Markevičius

- Directed by: Marius A. Markevičius
- Written by: Jon Weinbach; Marius A. Markevicius
- Produced by: Marius A. Markevičius; Jon Weinbach
- Starring: Jim Lampley; Bill Walton; Arvydas Sabonis
- Cinematography: Jesse Feldman
- Edited by: Dan Marks
- Production companies: Sorrento Productions, Berliner 76 Entertainment
- Release date: January 21, 2012 (Sundance)
- Running time: 89 minutes
- Countries: Lithuania; United States
- Languages: English, Lithuanian
- Budget: $500,000
- Box office: $133,778

The Other Dream Team (Lithuanian: Kita svajonių komanda) is a documentary film directed by Marius A. Markevičius. It covers the inspirational story of the 1992 Lithuania national basketball team and their journey to the bronze medal at the 1992 Summer Olympics in Barcelona. The film not only looks at the Lithuanian team but also at the broader historical events. The fall of the Soviet Union allowed Lithuania to reestablish its independence and enter the Olympics as an independent country.

The film includes interviews with many famous basketball figures, such as Arvydas Sabonis, David Stern, Jim Lampley, Bill Walton, and Šarūnas Marčiulionis. The title is an allusion to the Dream Team, the first American Olympic basketball team to feature active NBA players.

== Filming ==
Marius A. Markevičius is a Lithuanian-American director. It took him over three years to make this film. The documentary combines historical footage with new interviews. During filming, the Lithuanians were asked to speak in English for the interviews. But because of the emotional nature of the topic, speaking in their native tongue was easier. A series of cutaway scenes follows an up-and-coming Lithuanian player, Jonas Valančiūnas, from his native Utena to the 2011 NBA draft. The documentary also shows Arvydas Sabonis being inducted into the Naismith Basketball Hall of Fame in 2011.

== Content ==
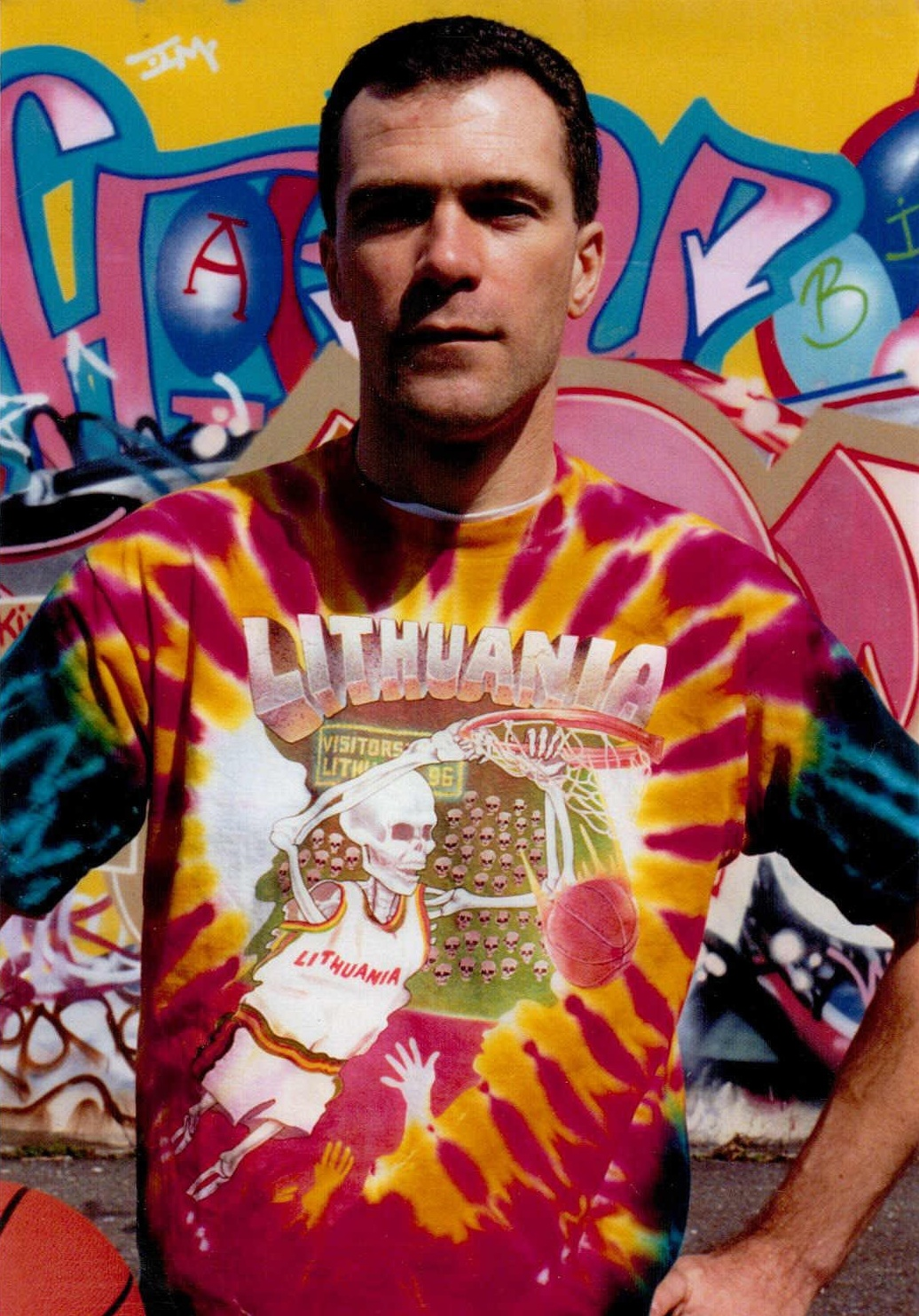
New York artist Greg Speirs wearing the Grateful Dead-inspired "Skully" tie-dyed T-shirt which he designed and became a symbol of Lithuanian basketball

Lithuanian basketball players, notably Arvydas Sabonis and Šarūnas Marčiulionis, played for the Soviet Union national basketball team in the 1988 Olympics in Seoul. There were four starters from Lithuania who were on the Soviet team. The players were promised that they would be permitted to play on western teams if they won gold, which they did with a 76–63 victory over Yugoslavia. Marčiulionis became the first Soviet player to join the NBA. Sabonis was actually the first Lithuanian to be drafted onto an American team, but because of the Iron Curtain he was not allowed to leave by the Soviet authorities that wanted to keep him as part of their senior national team.

The Lithuanian team had little money allocated to them for the 1992 Olympics in Barcelona. Because of an article written in a local newspaper, the Grateful Dead was moved by the team's plight and funded their trip to the Olympics. Artist Greg Speirs from New York was also moved by the team's plight and created the iconic Slam-Dunking Skeleton on tie-dye shirts which were made in the colors of the Lithuanian flag. The skeleton slam-dunking a basketball symbolized a phoenix rising from the ashes, according to the artist who created it.

The Lithuanian team had no illusions of beating the American Dream Team in the semifinals, and the U.S. ended up winning 127–76. In the bronze medal game, however, Lithuania was pitted against the Unified Team, made up of all of the post-Soviet states except the Baltic states of Lithuania, Estonia and Latvia. The game became a larger symbol of a reborn Lithuania fighting for its freedom and recognition. It was a close, nerve-wracking game that the Lithuanians desperately wanted to win. In the end, the Lithuanians defeated the Unified Team 82–78. The team wore their slam dunking skeleton tie-dye uniforms to accept their bronze medals.

== Reception ==
The movie was an official selection for the Sundance Film Festival and entered in the U.S. Documentary Competition in 2012. It received 87% rating on Rotten Tomatoes. It had a limited theatrical release starting September 28, 2012. It was also nominated for the Producers Guild of America Award for Best Documentary in 2012.

=== Aftermath ===
Not only does the documentary look at the events leading up to the 1992 Olympics, it also shows an up-and-coming Lithuanian player, Jonas Valančiūnas, before the NBA draft in 2011, presenting his success as the culmination of what his parents fought for. The documentary also shows Arvydas Sabonis being inducted into the Naismith Basketball Hall of Fame in 2011. Sales of the tie-dyed T-shirts continued, and the skeleton art's creator, Greg Speirs, donated 100% of his profits, ultimately totaling $450,000, to continue to fund the team as well as Lithuanian children's charities, thus acquiring 'major sponsor' status.

== Cast ==
- Jim Lampley as himself
- Bill Walton as himself
- Mickey Hart as himself
- Dan Majerle as himself
- Greg Speirs as himself
- Arvydas Sabonis as himself
- David Stern as himself
- Linas Kleiza as himself
- Mitch Richmond as himself
- David Remnick as himself
- Žydrūnas Ilgauskas as himself
- Chris Mullin as himself
- Alexander Wolff as himself
- Donnie Nelson as himself
- P.J. Carlesimo as himself
- Šarūnas Marčiulionis as himself
- Rimas Kurtinaitis as himself
- Robertas Javtokas as himself
- Vytautas Landsbergis as himself
- Vladas Garastas as himself
- Dennis McNally as himself
- Jonas Valančiūnas as himself
- Donatas Motiejūnas as himself
- Artūras Karnišovas as himself
- Linas Kunigėlis as himself
- Charles Smith as himself
- Kim Bohuny as himself

== See also ==
- List of basketball films
