= Mapplethorpe (film) =

2018 American biographical drama film about Robert Mapplethorpe

- Film poster
- Directed by: Ondi Timoner
- Screenplay by: Mikko Alanne; Ondi Timoner
- Produced by: Eliza Dushku; Ondi Timoner; Nate Dushku; Richard J. Bosner
- Starring: Matt Smith
- Cinematography: Nancy Schreiber
- Edited by: Lee Percy; John David Allen
- Music by: Marcelo Zarvos
- Production companies: Boston Diva Productions; Interloper Films
- Distributed by: Samuel Goldwyn Films
- Release dates: April 22, 2018 (Tribeca); March 1, 2019 (United States); April 2, 2021 (Director's cut)
- Running time: 102 minutes 114 minutes (Director's cut)
- Country: United States
- Language: English

Mapplethorpe is a 2018 American biographical drama film written and directed by Ondi Timoner about the life of photographer Robert Mapplethorpe. Shooting began on July 11, 2017, in New York City and lasted only 19 days. It premiered at the 2018 Tribeca Film Festival.

== Premise ==
The film depicts the life of Robert Mapplethorpe, a photographer who transformed taboo subjects such as gay sex, Satanism, and bondage into stylized black-and-white images.

== Cast ==
- Matt Smith as Robert Mapplethorpe
- McKinley Belcher III as Milton Moore
- Carolyn McCormick as Joan Mapplethorpe
- John Benjamin Hickey as Sam Wagstaff
- Tina Benko as Sandy Daley
- Brian Stokes Mitchell as Father Stack
- Marianne Rendón as Patti Smith
- Kerry Butler as Holly Solomon
- Thomas Philip O'Neill as David Croland
- John Bolton as Harold Jones
- Karan Oberoi as Emilio Acquavella
- Logan Smith as Young Robert
- Mark Moses as Harry Mapplethorpe
- Brandon Sklenar as Edward Mapplethorpe
- Jason Lopez as Tom Baril
- Anthony Michael Lopez as Jack Fritscher
- Hari Nef as Tinkerbelle
- Martin Axon as Martin Axon
- Mickey O'Hagan as Tina Summerlin

== Reception ==
Variety said that the film fails to capture the controversial nature of Mapplethorpe's work and portrays him as a role model who found his way into the elitist art world. Although the film is not as provocative as Mapplethorpe's photographs, it contains several hardcore scenes, and Matt Smith plays the artist's role until his death in 1989.

RogerEbert.com gave the film a 3-star rating and stated that, while the biopic follows a standard format of recounting the life of Mapplethorpe, it stands out in the portrayal of the relationships between artists and their creative processes. The article also praises Matt Smith's performance for its realism and unglamorous portrayal of Mapplethorpe.

Mapplethorpe has received six Audience Awards at Tribeca Film Festival, Sidewalk Film Festival, All Genders Lifestyles and Identities Film Festival, Key West Film Festival, Long Beach Q Film Festival, Oslo/Fusion International Film Festival, Out on Film Atlanta Film Festival, and Best LGBTQ Film at Key West Int'l Film Festival, Best Director at Long Beach Int'l Film Festival, Best Feature Film and Best Director at the Queen Palm International Film Festival and Best Feature Film and Best Director at the Hollywood Women's Film Festival.

== Releases ==
A director's cut was released in April 2021 with "restored scenes depicting Mapplethorpe’s childhood love of photography, his embattled relationship with his father, and his lingering, ambivalent connection to the Catholic faith".
