= Tru Davies =

Fictional character in Tru Calling series

- Eliza Dushku as Tru Davies
- First appearance: Pilot
- Last appearance: 'Twas the Night Before Christmas... Again
- Created by: John Hardmon Feldman
- Portrayed by: Eliza Dushku

In-universe information
- Occupation: Morgue worker
- Relatives: Harrison Davies, Meredith Davies, Richard Davies, Jorden Davies, Clarie Davies, Oliver Davies

Tru Davies is the main character of the TV series Tru Calling. She is portrayed by Eliza Dushku.

== Childhood ==
At the age of only 12 years old, Tru witnessed the murder of her mother, Elise Davies. Later in the series, it is revealed that Carl Neesan (Wade Williams), the hitman who killed her, was hired by Tru's father Richard. After her mother's demise, Tru, her younger brother Harrison and older sister Meredith were abandoned by their father and little has been revealed about who raised them from that point on.

== Supernatural power ==
Tru possesses the power to relive the current day when a corpse asks for her help in order to save their life, or to help someone whom the person affected in some way. Mostly triumphant, Tru has on occasion been unsuccessful in saving lives, sometimes because of the interference of Jack Harper and sometimes because the person was not meant to live. On some occasions her power manifested differently. In one episode, a group of five corpses all asked for her help at the same time. Other times, her day rewound more than once during a rewind day, as in "The Longest Day" and "Grace". In "The Last Good Day", when a dead woman asked Jack Harper for help, Tru finally experienced what Jack does when a corpse asks her for help. She described this as a dark feeling that she would never want to experience again.

== Good vs. evil ==
Although both can relive days, it has never been said who is evil, Tru or Jack. Jack has always been portrayed as evil, which Jack denies, although at certain times Jack has broken the rules of preserving fate, such as causing Luc's death to teach Tru a lesson.

While Tru claims that she is saving people who were taken before their time, Jack claims that he is merely preserving fate, and that if Tru saves someone who is meant to die, she creates a ripple effect in fate.

== Romantic relationships ==
- Mark Evans – Tru's college professor. After Tru spotted Mark cheating on her with another one of his students, she ended the relationship. When Tru had a party, Mark visited, only to be killed by one of Tru's friends. Tru then saved his life after he asked her for help, and they both had closure in their relationship.
- Nick Kelly – A fireman that was killed in a fire, then asked Tru for help. He was killed again in the same fire on his and Tru's first day together, though he did save a little girl who had originally died with him the first time.
- Luc Johnston – Luc is the crime scene photographer that works with Tru. Tru and Luc started dating and fell in love. However, Luc always questioned why Tru would take off at a moment's notice, eventually breaking up with her as he felt she was hiding something from him. When Tru finally revealed the truth to him, he refused to believe it. Jack then tricked him into going to visit a woman who would "provide clearer answers" and proof of Tru's abilities. Luc was instead shot and killed by the woman's jealous husband, who mistook Luc for his wife's supposed lover.
- Jensen Ritchie – Tru's college mate in med school, who was in a serious relationship when they first met. After he breaks up with his girlfriend, he and Tru spend a day together and end up kissing outside her apartment. He is then killed in an antique store robbery where he was buying an old medic case for Tru. When he is brought to the morgue, he doesn't ask for help – but later in the day, a different man who was killed asks for Tru's help. On the rewind day, Tru saves Jensen from being hit by a car driven by the very same victim she had to save that day. Davis and Jack warn her that there is a reason that Jensen did not ask for help – that it is his fate to die in the robbery, and that her changing fate will have consequences. Those consequences are never shown, as the show was cancelled abruptly. According to the writers, because of his near-death experience, he starts to become fascinated by death, which leads to him becoming a serial killer.

== Analysis ==
Karin Beeler argues that Davies is a "unique postfeminist reconstruction of the Cassandra figure." Dominique Mainon and James Ursini view her as a woman warrior, "battling not only potential killers and accidental chains of events, but also time."
