= Shok (film) =

- Film poster
- Directed by: Jamie Donoughue
- Written by: Jamie Donoughue
- Produced by: Harvey Ascott; Eshref Durmishi
- Starring: Lum Veseli; Andi Bajgora; Eshref Durmishi; Kushtrim Sheremeti; Fisnik Ademi
- Cinematography: Philip Robertson
- Edited by: Sarah Peczek
- Music by: Trimor Dhomi
- Production company: Eagle Eye Films
- Distributed by: Ouat Media
- Release date: 10 April 2015 (United States)
- Running time: 21 minutes
- Countries: Kosovo; United Kingdom
- Languages: Albanian; Serbian

Shok is a 2015 Kosovar short drama film written and directed by Jamie Donoughue, based on true events during the Kosovo war. Shok's distributor is Ouat Media, and the social media campaign is led by Team Albanians.

It premiered at Aspen Shortsfest winning Best Drama, Audience Special Recognition and the Youth Jury award. It has since won a number of other festivals including Hollyshorts Film Festival and DC Shorts Film Festival.

It was nominated for Best Live Action Short Film at the 88th Academy Awards, though it lost out to Stutterer.

== Plot ==
The film starts by scenes in present-day Kosovo, in which the adult Petrit (Kushtrim Sheremeti) finds an old bicycle like Oki's in the middle of the road.

The story shifts back during the 1990s war in Kosovo and centers on two young boys, Petrit (Lum Veseli) and Oki (Andi Bajgora). At the start of the film, the two ride on Oki's new bicycle to see a group of Serbian soldiers, to whom Petrit gives several slips of paper for rolling cigarettes. The soldiers' leader, Dragan (Eshref Durmishi), pays Petrit for the papers, and Petrit splits the money with Oki. Oki stays the night with Petrit's family, and Petrit asks him about making another delivery the following day. Oki is at first reluctant, thinking the soldiers cannot be trusted; but Petrit assures him he is safe, showing him a pistol he keeps hidden away. He also says he will soon be able to buy his own bicycle with the money he is earning, and Oki agrees to help him again.

The boys arrive at the soldiers' hideout, first a soldier (Fisnik Ademi) asks them for what are they here and Petrit says to see Dragan, where Petrit brings Dragan more paper slips; but as they leave, one of the other soldiers demands Oki's bicycle, intending to give it to his nephew. At Petrit's insistence, Oki complies; but he later berates Petrit for cooperating with the soldiers, calling him a traitor. Oki does not speak to Petrit for several days, despite the latter's apologies, until a bus they are on is stopped by the soldiers. The boys and several others are removed from the bus and searched; and when a soldier finds Albanian schoolbooks in Oki's backpack, Petrit claims they are his. In response, Dragan hits Petrit in the stomach with the butt of his rifle.

Oki comes by later to thank Petrit, and the two reconcile. Oki again spends the night at Petrit's, but the house is invaded by soldiers the following morning. Petrit and his family are led outside and lined up along the wall, while Oki remains hidden inside. As a soldier threatens Petrit at gunpoint, Oki appears, pointing Petrit's pistol at the soldier. The soldier takes the pistol, which he finds is not loaded, and throws Oki in line with Petrit's family. Another soldier then orders them all to leave the town and not look back, or else they will be killed. As Petrit's family, Oki, and several other residents walk out of town carrying their possessions, they see a young boy riding Oki's bicycle. Oki looks back at him as he passes and is shot through the head and killed by one of the soldiers. Petrit who is splattered with Oki's blood keeps walking with his family

The film switches to the adult Petrit. He rides off on the bicycle and eventually reaches the now-empty town, looking out on it forlornly as the film ends in that scene.

== Cast ==
- Lum Veseli as Petrit
- Kushtrim Sheremeti as Adult Petrit
- Andi Bajgora as Oki
- Eshref Durmishi as Dragan
- Fisnik Ademi as Soldier
