= Dear Albania =

2015 film by Nate Dushku, working with Eliza Dushku

- Directed by: Nate Dushku
- Produced by: Eliza Dushku; Blerim Destani; Nate Dushku; Fadil Berisha; Ali Zubik
- Starring: Eliza Dushku; Nate Dushku
- Cinematography: Enzo Brandner; Shkumbin Ferizi; Alket Islami; Christopher Landy
- Edited by: Bethe H. Gordon; Brooke Hanson
- Music by: Culley Johnson
- Release date: October 1, 2015
- Running time: 57 minutes
- Countries: Albania; United States; Kosovo
- Languages: Albanian, English

Dear Albania is a 2015 travel documentary film about Albania produced by Eliza Dushku and directed by Nate Dushku, who are of Albanian descent. Dushku’s father is an Albanian-American and her mother is of Danish and English descent. In Dear Albania, Eliza and her brother Nate travel to the Balkan region where they explore 15 cities throughout Albania, Kosovo, Montenegro and North Macedonia.

== See also ==
- Tourism in Albania
