= Eliza Dushku =

American therapist and ex-actress (born 1980)

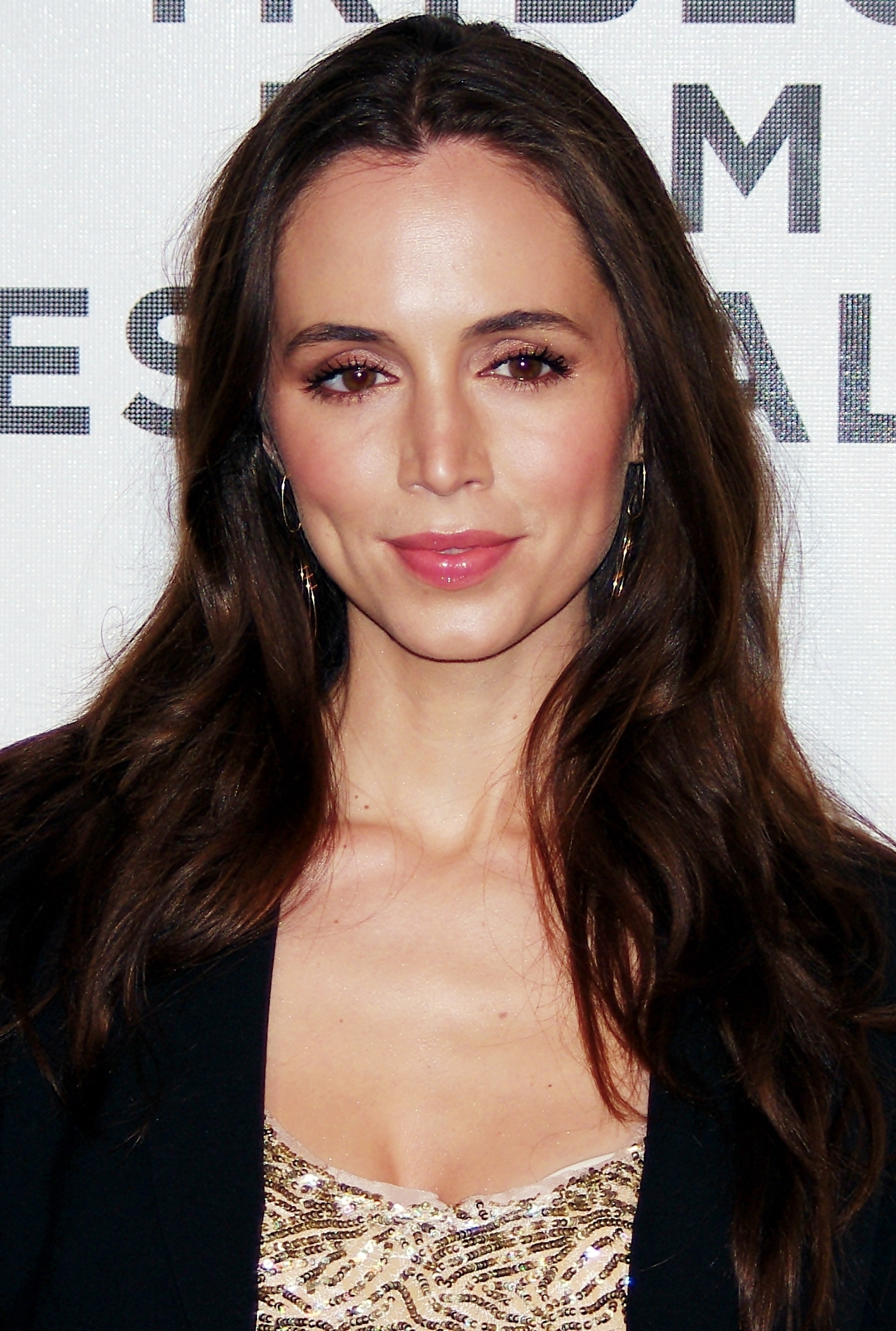
- Dushku in 2012
- Born: Eliza Patricia Dushku; December 30, 1980 (age 45); Boston, Massachusetts, U.S.
- Citizenship: United States; Albania
- Education: Lesley University (BA, MA)
- Occupation: Actress
- Years active: 1990–2017
- Known for: Bring It On; Buffy the Vampire Slayer; Dollhouse; Tru Calling; True Lies
- Spouse: Peter Palandjian (m. 2018)
- Children: 2
- Mother: Judy Dushku
- Relatives: Nate Dushku (brother)

Eliza Patricia Dushku (/ˈdʊʃkuː/; born December 30, 1980) is an American former actress. Dushku starred as Faith in the supernatural drama series Buffy the Vampire Slayer (1998–2003) and its spin-off series Angel (2000–2003). She also had lead roles in the Fox supernatural drama series Tru Calling (2003–2005) and the Fox science fiction series Dollhouse (2009–2010), for which she was a producer.

Dushku had starring roles in various films, including True Lies (1994), Bye Bye Love (1995), Bring It On (2000), Jay and Silent Bob Strike Back (2001), The New Guy (2002), Wrong Turn (2003), On Broadway (2007), The Scribbler (2014), Jane Wants a Boyfriend (2015), and Eloise (2016). She has also done voice work for numerous video games and animated films.

Dushku retired from acting after getting her master's degree in counseling. She works as a therapist and mental health advocate.

== Early life ==
Dushku was born in Boston and raised in Watertown, Massachusetts, the only daughter and youngest of the four children of school teacher and administrator Philip Dushku and Judy Dushku (née Rasmussen), a political science professor. Dushku's father was Boston-born, of Albanian heritage, with his parents coming from the city of Korçë. Her parents were divorced before she was born.

Dushku's mother was a member of the Church of Jesus Christ of Latter-day Saints, and Dushku and her three brothers were raised as members of the Church. She attended Beaver Country Day School in Chestnut Hill, Massachusetts, and graduated from Watertown High School.

== Career ==
=== Acting ===
==== 1992–1997: Beginnings and breakthrough ====
Dushku came to the attention of casting agents when she was ten years old. She was chosen in a five-month search for the lead role of Alice in the 1992 romantic drama film That Night. In 1993, Dushku landed a role as Pearl, alongside Robert De Niro and Leonardo DiCaprio, in the drama film This Boy's Life. The following year, she played the teenage daughter of Arnold Schwarzenegger and Jamie Lee Curtis in the action spy film True Lies.

She had roles as Piper Reeves in the short film Fishing with George (1994), as Cat in the television film Journey (1995), as Paul Reiser's daughter in the romantic comedy film Bye Bye Love (1995), and as Cindy Johnson in the comedy drama film Race the Sun (1996).

==== 1998–2002: Buffy the Vampire Slayer and recognition ====
Dushku planned to attend Suffolk University in Boston, where her mother taught, but her agent asked her to submit a videotape audition for a television show starring another of his clients, Sarah Michelle Gellar. After reading the script, Dushku rushed to a local Claire's to purchase dark makeup and other appropriate accessories for the part of Faith on Buffy the Vampire Slayer. When she began her work on the series, Dushku was still a minor, and had to receive emancipation to work the production's long hours. She later recalled with amusement that the judge who handled her emancipation case, who was an avid fan of the show, jokingly said that she would sign the emancipation order if she could get a signed photo from Dushku. Though initially planned as a three-episode role, the character became so popular that she stayed on for the whole third season and returned for a two-part appearance in season four and for the last five episodes of the series. She also appeared in the spin-off series Angel.

As an unwelcome effect of her portrayal as Faith, Dushku was inundated with fan mail from prisoners. She said:

I've been getting fan mail from maximum security penitentiaries and death row. What are the authorities thinking of in playing a show with young teenage girls to Death Row inmates? They write everything – disgusting things that you don't even want to know about. And they send me pictures – "Oh, here's a picture of me before I was incarcerated!" – and there's some guy sat on the sofa with a bottle of beer and a mustache, and a big gut. It's so creepy. Way more creepy than Buffy.

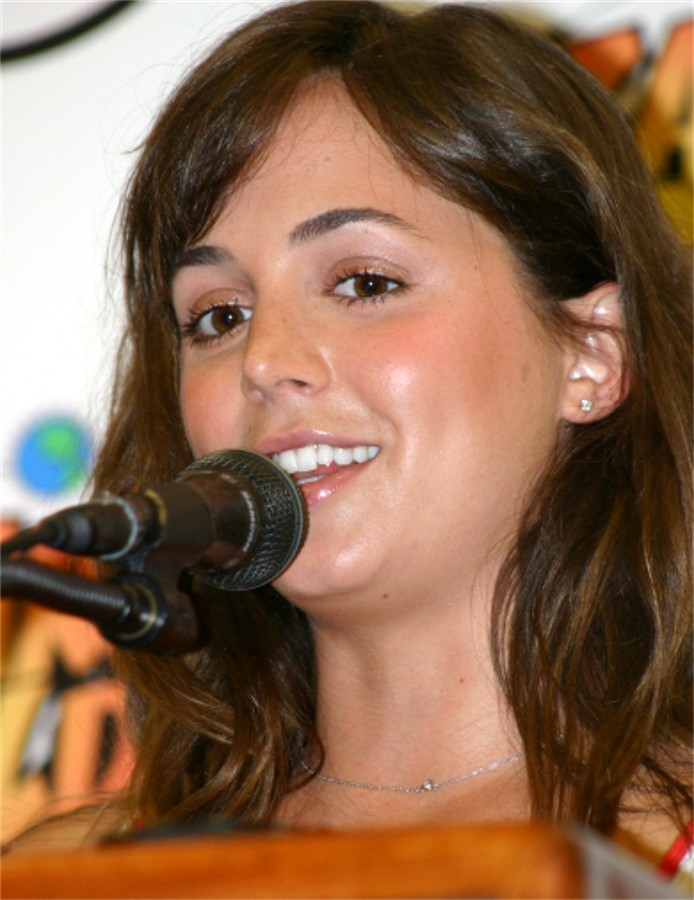
Dushku at Wizard World Comic Con in Philadelphia (May 2004)

In 2000, Dushku starred in the hit cheerleader comedy Bring It On. She followed that up with Soul Survivors, which reunited her with her Race the Sun co-star Casey Affleck. In 2001, she appeared in The New Guy with DJ Qualls and in City by the Sea with Robert De Niro and James Franco. The latter film garnered attention from a wider adult audience and several good reviews. The same year, Kevin Smith invited Dushku to be a part of Jay and Silent Bob Strike Back.

==== 2003–2008: Tru Calling and subsequent roles ====
In 2003, Dushku starred in the horror film Wrong Turn and The Kiss, an independent comedy-drama. Starting that same year, she starred in a new Fox supernatural drama, Tru Calling, where she played the main character, medical student Tru Davies. After having a grant withdrawn, Tru is forced to take a job at a local morgue, where she discovers her power to "re-live" the previous day over again if one of the deceased asks for her help to change what has happened. Dushku turned down a role in a spin-off of Buffy the Vampire Slayer about Faith.

She has had many roles as a "bad girl" in films. In an interview with Maxim in May 2001, Dushku says of her roles, "It's easy to play a bad girl: You just do everything you've been told not to do, and you don't have to deal with the consequences, because it's only acting."

Dushku starred in the Off-Broadway play Dog Sees God in December 2005. The play was based on the Peanuts comic strip, with Dushku playing a character symbolizing Lucy Van Pelt. She quit in February 2006 along with other members of the cast amid rumors of abuse by the producer, which were later dismissed.

She played the lead character on Nurses, a hospital comedy-drama for Fox. This was the second Fox pilot in which she was cast, but not broadcast.

She appeared in the Simple Plan music video "I'm Just a Kid" as the band's love interest, as well as Nickelback's video for "Rockstar".

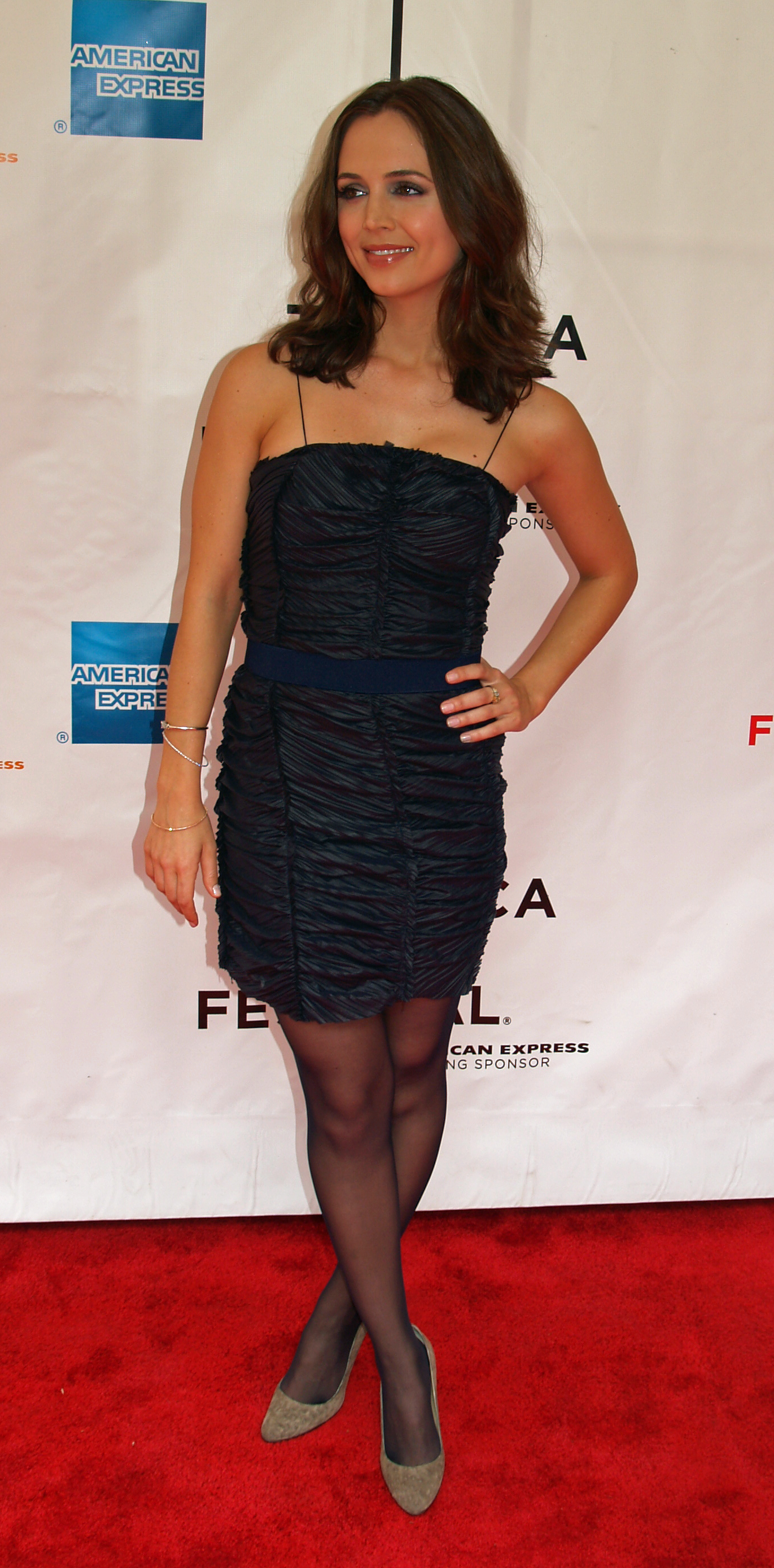
Dushku at Tribeca Film Festival (2007)

On October 1, 2005, she announced at Wizard World Boston that shooting had begun for Nobel Son in which she would star with Alan Rickman, Danny DeVito, and Bill Pullman. The film was released at the 2007 Tribeca Film Festival. Another project released in 2007 was On Broadway, an independent film filmed in Boston. It received positive reviews, with a few of them highlighting Dushku's performance.

Dushku has had roles in five video games. She voiced the role of Yumi Sawamura in the English-language version of Yakuza for the PlayStation 2, released in September 2006. Dushku also stars as Shaundi, one of the lead characters in Saints Row 2. She was the voice talent for the role of Rubi Malone, the main character in the game WET. S She also voiced Megan McQueen in Champion Mode of the 2011 video game Fight Night Champion.

Variety announced on August 2, 2006, that Dushku would co-star with Macaulay Culkin in Sex and Breakfast, a dark comedy written and directed by Miles Brandman. A reviewer described Dushku as "charming" and giving the character "an edge". The film was released in Los Angeles on November 30, 2007. She starred in Open Graves, a 2008 horror-thriller about a satanic game co-starring Mike Vogel. She played the main character in The Thacker Case and The Alphabet Killer, both thrillers based on real-life events, one of them directed by Rob Schmidt, with whom she had worked on Wrong Turn. Both films were released in 2008. The Alphabet Killer earned mixed reviews, but reviewers praised Dushku's performance, commenting "Eliza Dushku commands the screen but cannot reconcile the script's conflicted and increasingly idiotic agendas." She appeared in Bottle Shock, a 2008 drama about Napa valley wine. The film was directed by Randall Miller, who helmed Nobel Son.

==== 2009–2017: Dollhouse, other work, and retirement ====
On August 26, 2007, Dushku signed a development deal with Fox Broadcasting Company and 20th Century Fox. Under the pact, the network and the studio would develop projects tailor-made for the actress as well as approach her with existing pitches and scripts.

Subsequently, it was announced on October 31 that Dushku had lured Joss Whedon, of Buffy the Vampire Slayer, back to TV, to create a television series called Dollhouse. Dushku produced the show and played the main character, 'Echo'. It aired on Fox during the 2008–09 TV season. In an interview, Dushku talked about how Dollhouse and her reconnection with Whedon came about:

I invited Joss Whedon to lunch after I did the business deal with Fox. We'd had a cool relationship in the past and I so wanted to do something else, and I wanted to get back into a television show. I had him on the brain for sure but I hadn't called him yet, but I sort of took a leap of faith and set things up with Fox and then called Joss. We went to a four-hour lunch where I just sort of used my womanly wiles. No, we've become such good friends, kind of like brother and sister and kind of like he was my watcher, my handler from when I first moved out to L.A. when I was 17 and I was a little bit of a wild child. He's watched me and helped me and taught me over the years. I told him how bad I wanted and needed him back and he accepted and here we are.

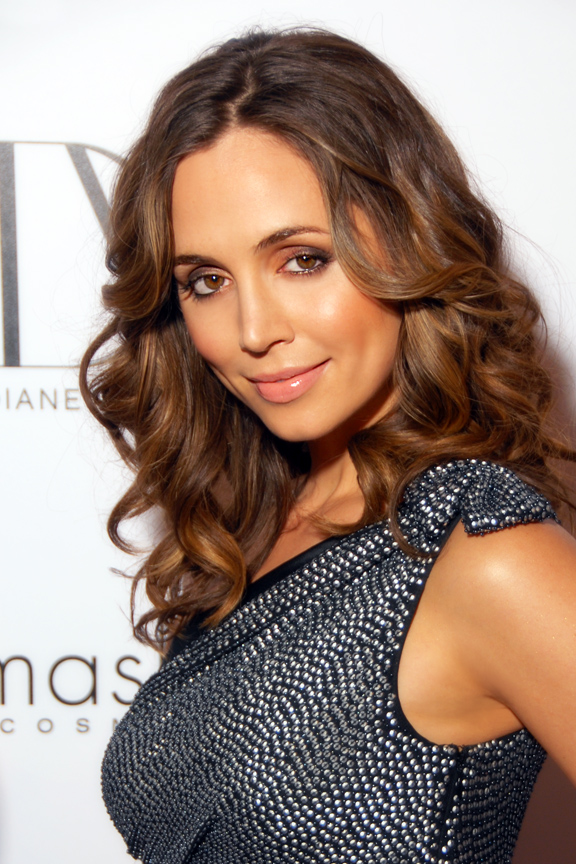
Dushku at a fashion event (2009)

Dushku described Whedon as "my favorite genius ... favorite friend ... big brother ... and the only person out here I've ever wholeheartedly trusted, because he's never let me down." Dollhouse was renewed for a second season. The producers cited their confidence in the strength of Whedon's fan base and high DVR numbers as their reasons for keeping the show. Fox cancelled Dollhouse on November 11, 2009. The show officially wrapped filming on the second and final season on December 16, 2009. The same year, she posed nude for the May 2009 issue of Allure.

In 2010, Dushku provided her voice for Noah's Ark: The New Beginning and appeared in the film Locked In. She also guest-starred in an episode of CBS' comedy The Big Bang Theory which aired on November 4, 2010. In 2011, Dushku featured alongside Jayson Floyd in "One Shot", a short action clip on YouTube directed by and starring Freddie Wong, released on May 13, 2011.

Dushku had a lead role in the online animated "motion comic" series Torchwood: Web of Lies, based on the BBC series Torchwood: Miracle Day. In June 2012, Dushku starred with Katie Cassidy, Gina Gershon and Michelle Trachtenberg in The Scribbler, directed by John Suits and produced by Gabriel Cowan.

In 2013, she was cast as Patricia Holm in a pilot film for a proposed TV revival series of The Saint, but the series was not commissioned. In July 2017 the pilot was released on digital HD/VOD.

From 2013 to 2015, Dushku voiced the role of She-Hulk in the Disney XD animated series Hulk and the Agents of S.M.A.S.H.. In 2014, it was announced that she would star in Randall Miller's Midnight Rider, a biopic of Gregg Allman. In 2016, she was cast in a recurring role in the fourth season of the Cinemax TV series Banshee. In 2017, she had a recurring guest role in the last three episodes of the first season of the CBS drama series Bull with the option of becoming a series regular in season two. Dushku later testified to the House Judiciary committee that she was fired after being sexually harassed by the star of Bull.

After an eight year hiatus, in December 2025, Dushku confirmed her retirement from acting during an interview with The Hollywood Reporter, stating: "I will not be in front of a camera again unless it's in some capacity that is in service of my new work and passion."

==== Accusations by Dushku of sexual molestation and harassment ====
In January 2018, Dushku publicly stated that she had been molested by stunt coordinator Joel Kramer when she was 12 during the production of True Lies. She wrote that soon after, an adult friend of Dushku confronted Kramer on set, and that the same day, Dushku was injured during a stunt and several of her ribs were broken, while Kramer was responsible for her safety. Kramer has denied the accusation of sexual misconduct.

In January 2019, CBS made a $9.5 million settlement with Dushku after she was fired from a recurring role on Bull, after informing producers of series lead Michael Weatherly's alleged inappropriate behavior on the set. According to documents from the official mediation, Weatherly was recorded on video making comments about spanking Dushku over his knee, soliciting a threesome, alluding to sexual assault in his "rape van", and other harassing statements. After Dushku spoke with the producers, Weatherly texted CBS Television Studios' president David Stapf saying he wanted to talk about Dushku's sense of humor, though Stapf pushed back saying "Ms. Dushku made the show better." Days later, showrunner Glenn Gordon Caron terminated Dushku's expected role on the show, despite opposition from studio executives. The settlement amount was calculated to compensate Dushku for her loss of earnings from her planned promotion to a series regular, with "well-developed plans" set to make her a regular cast member following her three-episode guest appearance. In December 2018, when the settlement was reported, Weatherly publicly apologized for the comments. Dushku responded that Weatherly broke the terms of their settlement by speaking to the press and characterized his apology as "more deflection, denial, and spin". In November 2021, Dushku testified in front of the House Judiciary Committee about her sexual harassment accusations during her time on Bull.

In February 2021, Dushku shared a message of support for Charisma Carpenter, in reference to allegations of abuse against Buffy creator Joss Whedon.

=== Production work ===
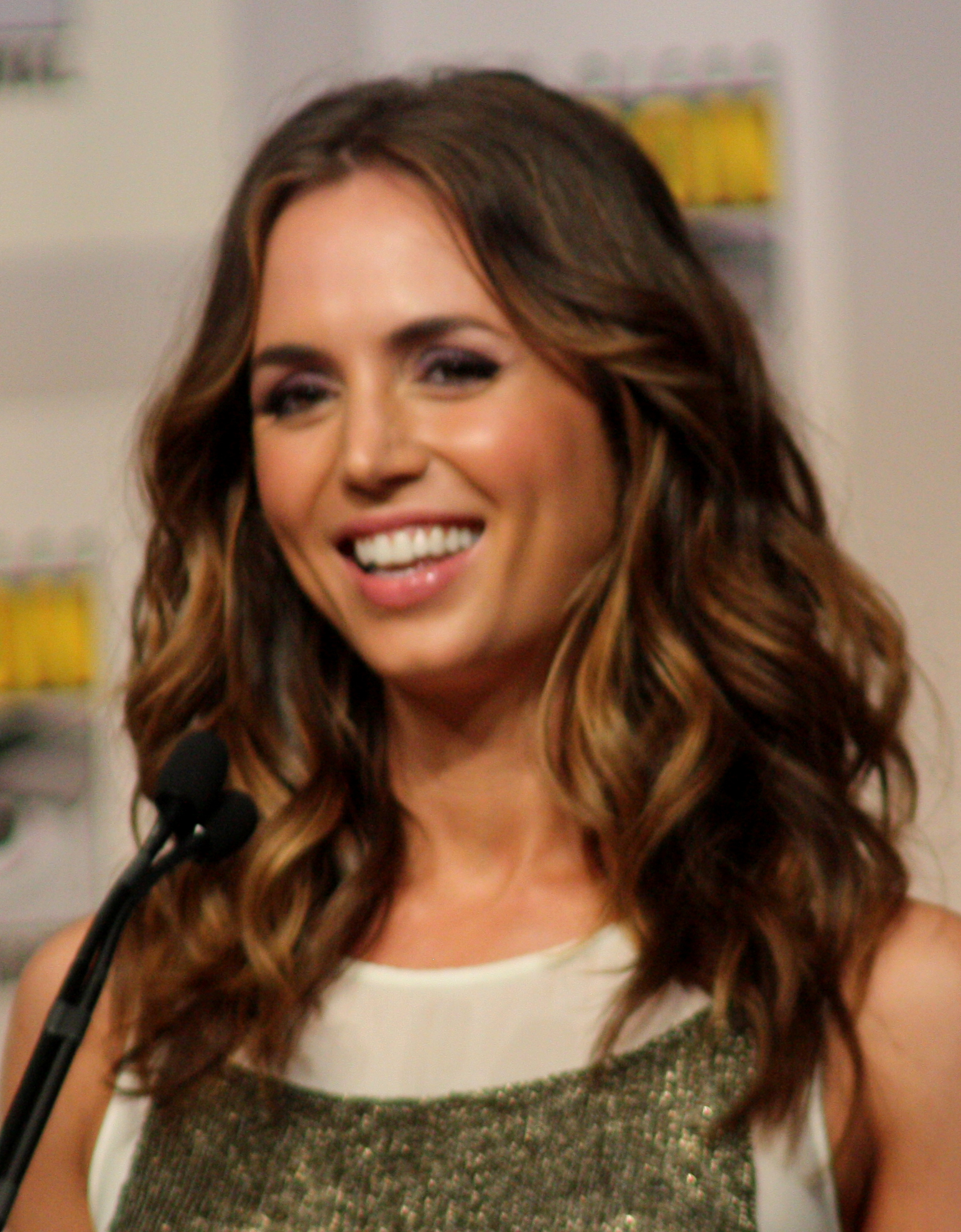
Eliza Dushku at the 2009 San Diego Comic-Con

In August 2011, Dushku visited Albania with a crew from the Travel Channel and Lonely Planet to film Dear Albania, a documentary promoting tourism in her father's family's country of origin.

Dushku became CEO of her own production company, Boston Diva Productions, with her brother Nate as a partner. She secured exclusive rights to make an authorized film based on the life of photographer Robert Mapplethorpe. At one time provisionally entitled The Perfect Moment, the film was in development over more than a decade. Eventually she enlisted the help of Ondi Timoner and Mapplethorpe, with Matt Smith as the title character, was brought to the screen in 2018.

In 2017, her production company, in association with IM Global Television, was reported to be developing Glen Cook's The Black Company series of books for a television series, with Dushku potentially starring as The Lady.

In 2024, Dushku and her husband, Peter Palandjian, were executive producers of the documentary film, In Waves and War, which follows several former Navy SEALs as they battle PTSD, depression, and traumatic brain injuries and turn to psychedelic-assisted therapy in order to combat their mental health struggles. The film was released by Netflix on November 3, 2025.

== Personal life ==
Dushku was raised in the Church of Jesus Christ of Latter-day Saints (LDS Church), and still has a Mormon-themed tattoo. She describes herself as having taken a different path from the LDS Church, and is grateful for having grown up in it.

Dushku lived for more than 15 years in Los Angeles, though spending substantial time back in Watertown and Boston in the period before her stepfather died. She lived for several years in the Laurel Canyon area.

In 2014 Dushku moved back to Watertown in order to attend college in Boston. As of 2016, she was a student at Suffolk University, studying sociology. In 2019, Boston Magazine reported that she was studying holistic psychology at Lesley University; she graduated in 2020. In 2023, it was reported by The Boston Globe that Dushku was studying for her master's degree in counseling and clinical mental health, with a focus on psychedelic-assisted therapies and treatment for addiction and mental health.

During an interview with Boston Magazine in September 2024, Dushku revealed she had become a certified therapist, primarily focusing on psychedelic therapy for trauma patients. She has also become an advocate for the use of psychedelic drugs in mental health treatment, citing her experiences with using the substances to treat her own mental struggles. In June 2025, Dushku received her master's degree in clinical mental health counseling from Lesley University.

She campaigned for Bernie Sanders in the U.S. presidential election of 2016.

Duskhu and her husband have donated $7.5 million to Brigham and Women's, where the Brigham and Women’s Eliza Dushku Palandjian and Peter Palandjian Bridge Clinic was named in their honor.

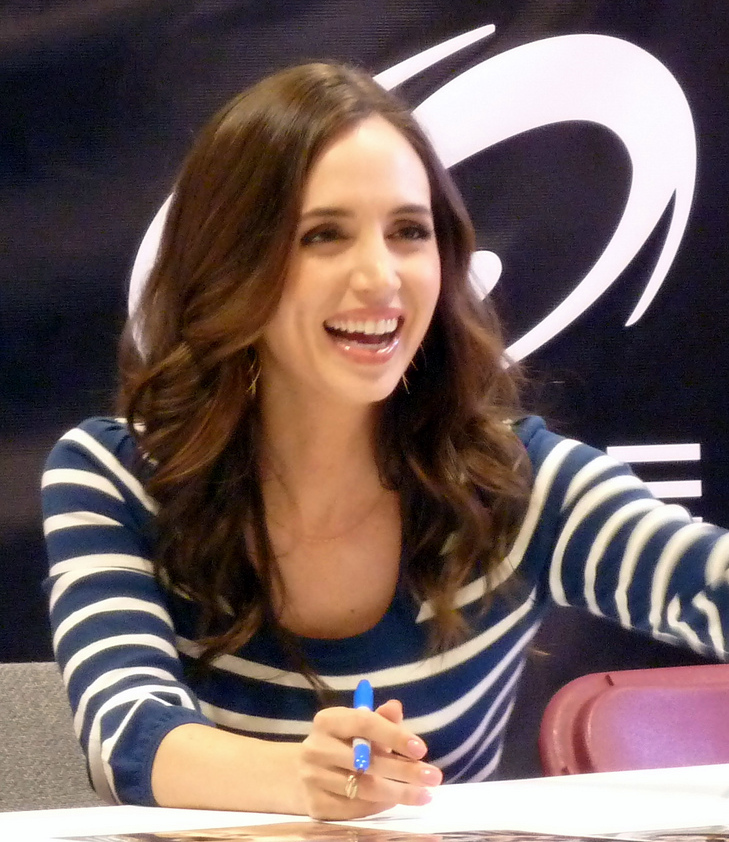
Dushku at Fan Expo Canada in Toronto, 2011

=== Relationships ===
Dushku began dating former Boston Celtics and Los Angeles Lakers basketball player Rick Fox in October 2009, and in August 2010 the couple confirmed that they were living together. It was announced on June 24, 2014, that the pair had split.

In June 2017, she became engaged to businessman Peter Palandjian and they wed on August 18, 2018. On August 1, 2019, Dushku announced the birth of the couple's son. In February 2021, Dushku announced via Instagram that she was pregnant again. In August 2021, Dushku gave birth to the couple's second son.

=== Activism ===
Dushku serves on the board of directors of the THRIVE-Gulu organization (The Trauma Healing and Reflection Center in Gulu), an organization dedicated to helping the survivors of war (including former child soldiers) in Northern Uganda, which her mother and stepfather co-founded. She raised US$30,000 for the land for the center's building, and has performed other fundraising activities, as well as helping out in the center itself.

As a role model to campus leaders for her activism, Dushku was invited by the Millennium Campus Network (MCN) as a national keynote speaker and honored as a Global Generation Award winner alongside U.S. Secretary of State John Kerry at MCN events in 2011.

Over several years, Dushku raised funds for Camp Hale, which had been attended by her father and brothers, including some specific campaigning to sustain a new concept of a girls' session at the camp, which was launched in 2012, and which she joined in person.

=== Albanian citizenship ===
Dushku visited her father's family and their home city in Albania in 2006 after receiving an invitation from Albanian Prime Minister Sali Berisha. She also visited Kosovo and got an Albanian Eagle tattoo on the back of her neck. While on her second visit to Albania in 2011, Dushku applied for Albanian citizenship and obtained an Albanian passport and identity card. Dushku became an honorary citizen of Tirana, and was given the honorary title of Tirana Ambassador of Culture and Tourism in the World by Tirana mayor Lulzim Basha. Additionally, she was given honorary citizen status in her father's home town of Korçë. She and her brother Nate Dushku produced a film about their joint visit to Albania, Dear Albania.

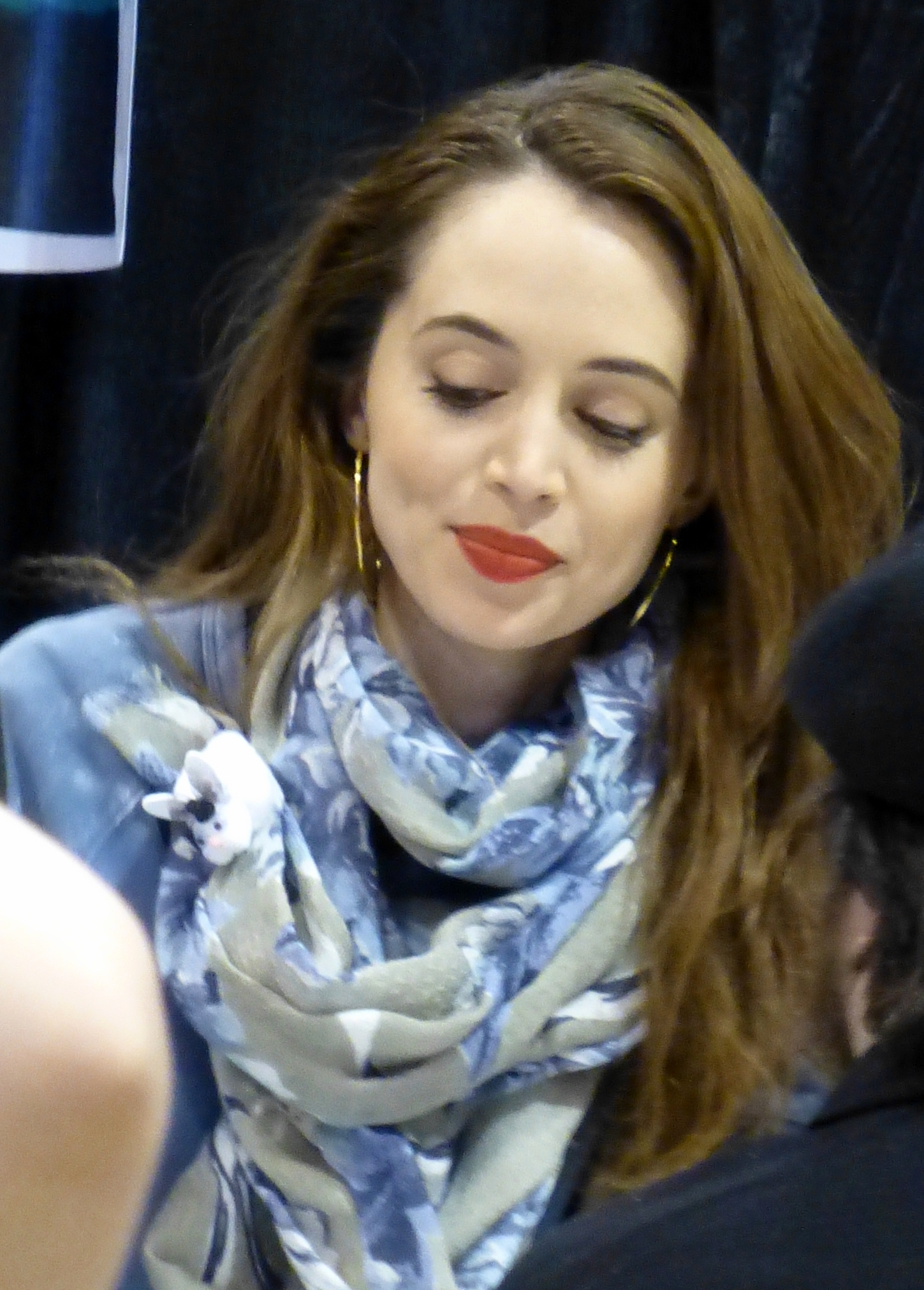
Dushku at Wizard World on April 6, 2014

=== Health ===
Dushku has said that she has attention deficit hyperactivity disorder (ADHD). She announced in December 2011 that she switched to a vegan diet after watching the documentary Forks Over Knives. In December 2014, she said she was no longer a vegetarian. On March 7, 2017, Dushku attended a Youth Summit on Opioid Awareness, where she revealed that she was a recovering alcoholic and drug addict, having begun drinking and abusing drugs at the age of 14, and that she had been sober for eight-and-a-half years. She said her addictions were at one point so serious that her brother forbade her from being left alone with his daughter.

== Filmography ==
=== Film ===
Year	Title	Role	Notes
1992	That Night	Alice Bloom	
1993	This Boy's Life	Pearl	
1994	Fishing with George	Piper Reeves	Short film
1994	True Lies	Dana Tasker	
1995	Bye Bye Love	Emma	
1995	Journey	Cat	Television film
1996	Race the Sun	Cindy Johnson	
2000	Bring It On	Missy Pantone	
2001	Jay and Silent Bob Strike Back	Sissy	
2001	Soul Survivors	Annabel	
2002	The New Guy	Danielle	
2002	City by the Sea	Gina	
2003	Stan Winston: Monster Mogul	Herself	Short film
2003	Wrong Turn	Jessie Burlingame	
2003	The Kiss	Megan	Direct-to-video
2006	The Last Supper	Waitress	Short film
2007	On Broadway	Lena Wilson	
2007	Nobel Son	City Hall	
2007	Sex and Breakfast	Renee	
2007	Nurses	Eve Morrow	Television film
2008	Bottle Shock	Joe	
2008	The Alphabet Killer	Megan Paige	
2008	The Coverup	Monica Wright	
2009	Open Graves	Erica	
2010	Locked In	Renee	
2011	Batman: Year One	Selina Kyle / Catwoman	Voice
2011	DC Showcase: Catwoman	Selina Kyle / Catwoman	Voice, short film
2011	Herd Mentality	Casey	Television film
2012	Noah's Ark: The New Beginning	Zalbeth	Voice
2013	Jay & Silent Bob's Super Groovy Cartoon Movie!	Lipstick Lesbian	Voice
2014	The Scribbler	Jennifer Silk	
2014	The Gable 5	Taylor Shaye	Short film
2015	Dear Albania	Herself	Documentary; also director
2015	Jane Wants a Boyfriend	Bianca	
2016	Eloise	Pia Carter	
2017	The Saint	Patricia Holm	Television film
2018	Mapplethorpe	N/A	Producer
2024	In Waves and War	N/A	Documentary; executive producer

=== Television ===
Year	Title	Role	Notes
1998–2003	Buffy the Vampire Slayer	Faith Lehane (Note: She also portrays Buffy in "Who Are You?")	20 episodes
2000–2003	Angel	Faith Lehane	6 episodes
2002	King of the Hill	Jordan Hilgren-Bronson (voice)	Episode: "Get Your Freak Off"
2003	Punk'd	Herself	Episode: "Eliza Dushku/Mandy Moore"
2003–2005	Tru Calling	Tru Davies	Main role; 26 episodes
2005	That '70s Show	Sarah	Episode: "It's All Over Now"
2007	Ugly Betty	Cameron Ashlock	Episode: "Giving Up the Ghost"
2009–2010	Dollhouse	Echo / Caroline Farrell	Main role; 27 episodes; Also producer
2010	The Big Bang Theory	FBI Special Agent Angela Page	Episode: "The Apology Insufficiency"
2010	RuPaul's Drag Race	Herself / Guest Judge	Episode: "Face, Face, Face of Cakes"
2011	Robotomy	Shockzana	Episode: "From Wretchnya with Love"; voice role
2011	White Collar	Raquel Laroque	Episode: "On the Fence"
2011	The Cleveland Show	Herself (voice)	Episode: "Hot Cocoa Bang Bang"
2011	The Guild	Herself	Episode: "Social Traumas"
2011	Torchwood: Web of Lies	Holly Mokri (voice)	Main role; 7 episodes
2011	The League	Kristen	Episode: "The Light of Genesis"
2011–2012	Leap Year	June Pepper	5 episodes; also consulting producer
2013–2015	Hulk and the Agents of S.M.A.S.H.	Jennifer Walters / She-Hulk (voice)	Main cast; 52 episodes
2015	Ultimate Spider-Man	Jennifer Walters / She-Hulk (voice)	Episode: "Contest of Champions"
2016	Banshee	Agent Veronica Dawson	5 episodes
2016	Princess Rap Battle	Rapunzel	Episode: "Rapunzel & Flynn vs. Anna & Kristoff"
2016	Con Man	Cindy	Episode: "Gum Drop"
2017	Bull	J. P. Nunnelly	3 episodes

=== Video games ===
Year	Title	Voice role	Notes
2003	Buffy the Vampire Slayer: Chaos Bleeds	Faith	
2005	Yakuza	Yumi Sawamura / Mizuki Sawamura	English dub
2008	Saints Row 2	Shaundi	
2009	Wet	Rubi Malone	
2011	Fight Night Champion	Megan McQueen	

=== Music videos ===
Year	Title	Artist	Role	Notes
2002	"I'm Just a Kid"	Simple Plan	Popular Girl	
2006	"Rockstar"	Nickelback	Herself	

== Awards and nominations ==
Year	Association	Category	Work	Result
2004	Teen Choice Award	Choice Breakout Star – Female	Tru Calling	Nominated
2004	Saturn Award	Best Actress in a Television Series	Tru Calling	Nominated
2009	Scream Award	Best Science Fiction Actress	Dollhouse	Nominated
2009	Fangoria Chainsaw Award	Best Actress	The Alphabet Killer	Nominated
2013	Streamy Award	Best Guest Appearance	Leap Year	Nominated

== Honors ==
- Dushku was ranked by Maxim magazine as 6th on the "Hot 100 Women of 2009" list.
- Dushku was named Ambassador for the 2012 Consumer Electronics Show Entertainment Matters program in October 2011.
- In May 2026, Lesley University awarded Dushku an honorary Doctor of Humane Letters in recognition of her work in psychedelic therapy, trauma care, and mental-health advocacy.
- Historian Fyodor Tertitskiy dedicated his 2026 book Pyongyang on the Brink to Dushku.
- In June 2026, the New England Council named her one of its 2026 New Englanders of the Year, with the award presented at its annual celebration on October 29.
