= Tru Calling =

American supernatural drama television series

- Genre: Supernatural; Drama
- Created by: Jon Harmon Feldman
- Starring: Eliza Dushku; Shawn Reaves; Zach Galifianakis; A. J. Cook; Jessica Collins; Benjamín Benítez; Matthew Bomer; Jason Priestley
- Theme music composer: We 3 Kings
- Opening theme: "Somebody Help Me" by Full Blown Rose
- Composers: Robert Duncan; Jon Ehrlich; Jason Derlatka
- Country of origin: United States
- Original language: English
- No. of seasons: 2
- No. of episodes: 26

Production
- Executive producers: Jon Harmon Feldman; Marty Adelstein; Neal H. Moritz; Dawn Parouse; R. W. (Bob) Goodwin
- Producers: Robert Doherty; Eliza Dushku
- Production locations: Vancouver, British Columbia, Canada
- Running time: 43 minutes
- Production companies: Original Film; Oh That Gus!, Inc.; 20th Century Fox Television

Original release
- Network: Fox (episodes 1–25); Syfy (episode 26)
- Release: October 30, 2003 – April 21, 2005

Tru Calling is an American supernatural drama television series which aired on Fox. Original episodes aired between October 30, 2003, and April 21, 2005; however, the final episode was shown in other territories before it was aired in the United States due to lower-than-anticipated ratings.

The show starred Eliza Dushku as Tru Davies, a twenty-two-year-old medical school student who takes a job at the city morgue when her internship falls through. When the corpse of a deceased woman seems to awaken and asks for her help, Tru discovers that she has the incredible power to relive that day to try to prevent that death. As the series progresses, Tru must master her time-bending gift while juggling the demands of her job and the chaos of her personal life—all while digging into the enigmatic family secrets that haunt her past.

Created by Jon Harmon Feldman, the show was produced by Original Film, Oh That Gus!, Inc., and 20th Century Fox Television.

== Series overview ==
Tru is aided by her boss, Davis (Zach Galifianakis), who acts as a sort of guide and mentor, who is later revealed to have known about Tru's mother (who was, apparently, the last person to receive the "calling" before her daughter), her best friend Lindsey (A.J. Cook), who doesn't know Tru's secret, and her impulsive, good-natured and bumbling younger brother Harrison (Shawn Reaves). Tru keeps her secret from her boyfriends, as well as her sister Meredith (Jessica Collins), who has a drug problem.

Halfway through the first season, Tru's life gets much more complicated when she meets Jack Harper (Jason Priestley), a man who shares Tru's abilities but who works to preserve what he sees as the hand of Fate by ensuring that the people Tru tries to help stay dead, though the series was canceled before the conclusion of their struggle was written. In the first-season finale, it is revealed that Tru's father knows Jack Harper and that he had played a similarly antagonistic role versus Tru's mother, terminating her by hiring a hitman to kill her, though neither Harrison nor Tru found out.

The second season does not feature Tru's best friend Lindsey nor her sister Meredith, whose characters are not mentioned. This season has Tru juggling medical school and her life-saving ability, while Jack aims to foil her attempts at every turn.

== Cast and characters ==
=== Main ===
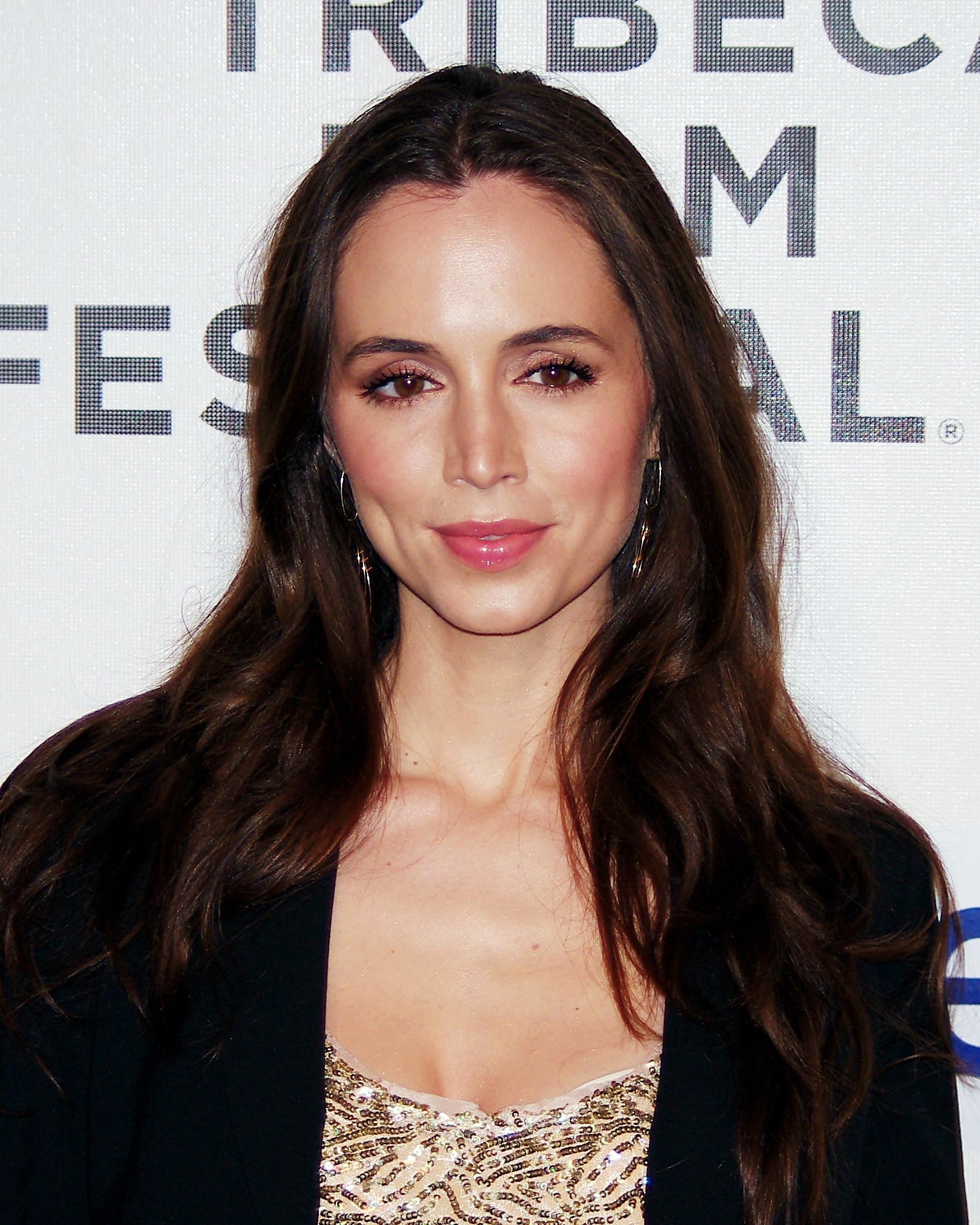
Eliza Dushku played the role of Tru Davies.

- Eliza Dushku as Tru Davies
- Shawn Reaves as Harrison Davies
- Zach Galifianakis as Davis
- A. J. Cook as Lindsey Walker (season 1)
- Matt Bomer as Luc Johnston (season 1)
- Jessica Collins as Meredith Davies (season 1)
- Benjamín Benítez as Gardez (season 1)
- Jason Priestley as Jack Harper

=== Recurring ===
- Liz Vassey as Dr. Carrie Allen (season 2)
- Cotter Smith as Richard Davies (season 2)
- Eric Christian Olsen as Jensen Ritchie (season 2)
- Lizzy Caplan as Avery Bishop (season 2)
- Parry Shen as Tyler Li (season 2)

== Episodes ==
=== Season 1 (2003–04) ===
No. overall	No. in season	Title	Directed by	Written by	Original release date	Prod. code
1	1	"Pilot"	Phillip Noyce	Jon Harmon Feldman	October 30, 2003	1AHP79
After graduating from college, hopeful medical school student Tru Davies is forced to take a job with the city morgue after finding out that her planned internship at a local hospital was no longer available. When a woman arrives at the morgue who died before her time, Tru sees the woman seemingly awaken and ask for Tru's help. The entire day rewinds, and Tru finds herself racing against the clock in order to save the woman's life before she dies, alongside trying to fix some of her own mistakes.
2	2	"Putting Out Fires"	Thomas J. Wright	Story by : Chris Brancato & Albert J. Salke; Teleplay by : Chris Brancato	November 6, 2003	1AHP01
When her relationship with one of her former professors falls through, Tru finds herself questioning the possibility of a relationship contending with her secret. However, when two victims of a fire – a girl and an attractive firefighter – ask for her help, Tru finds herself falling in unexpected love as she tries to prevent arson.
3	3	"Brother's Keeper"	Paul Shapiro	Jon Harmon Feldman	November 13, 2003	1AHP02
Tru is relieved when Harrison finally seems to have met the right woman. But questions are asked and unsettling suspects raised when Harrison's new girlfriend's murdered ex-husband arrives at the morgue and asks for Tru's help.
4	4	"Past Tense"	Jeff Woolnough	Zack Estrin & Chris Levinson	November 20, 2003	1AHP03
Tru tries to get a handle on living with her gift, but soon finds her hands full as five men all arrive at the morgue, each having died at the same bachelor party, as all five of them ask for her help. The only problem is, each came in under a gurney sheet and Tru has no idea what any of them look like.
5	5	"Haunted"	Michael Katleman	Douglas Petrie	December 4, 2003	1AHP04
When a brilliant young med student arrives at the morgue, Tru tries to help her even as she questions her own life, as her dreams of going to med school herself seem to have been put on hold by her newfound responsibilities. Things get even more complicated, however, when Tru discovers that the young woman was part of a highly illegal and risky experiment to temporarily die in order to recover lost memories. Davis tells Tru that he knows about her secret.
6	6	"Star-Crossed"	Sanford Bookstaver	Chad Hodge	December 11, 2003	1AHP05
What at first looks similar to Romeo and Juliet turns complicated and dangerous when Tru investigates the deaths of two students who both attended the same expensive academy who died together in a car accident.
7	7	"Morning After"	Dave Barrett	Robert Doherty	December 18, 2003	1AHP06
After a belated house-warming party, Tru wakes up with the dead body of her ex-boyfriend lying in her bed.
8	8	"Closure"	David Solomon	Jon Harmon Feldman	January 8, 2004	1AHP07
Tru helps a military veteran who's accidentally shot and killed. Meanwhile, her personal life gets complicated after a harsh phone call from the Davies' mostly absent father prompts her sister Meredith to take her boss Davis out on a date.
9	9	"Murder in the Morgue"	David Solomon	Zack Estrin & Chris Levinson	January 15, 2004	1AHP08
When Tru catches a man in the act of covering up a murder, he shoots Davis and fires at Tru before the day rewinds. Meanwhile, she tries to prove to Harrison once and for all that she really does relive days.
10	10	"Reunion"	Allan Kroeker	Douglas Petrie	January 22, 2004	1AHP09
When Tru and Lindsay attend their high school reunion, Tru finds herself trying to save the life of the woman who was once her best friend but callously dumped her five years earlier in order to steal her prom date and become Prom Queen.
11	11	"The Longest Day"	David Grossman	Story by : Dana Greenblatt; Teleplay by : Chad Hodge	February 5, 2004	1AHP10
Tru finds herself stuck in a tragic loop as she rushes to prevent a murder at a local grocery store, only to have the day rewind over and over again as each of her actions inadvertently cause the death of a different unintended victim each time.
12	12	"Valentine"	Paul Shapiro	Robert Doherty	February 12, 2004	1AHP11
Tru, Lindsay, Luc, and Harrison visit a remote mountain retreat for Valentine's Day.
13	13	"Drop Dead Gorgeous"	Michael Katleman	Story by : Scott Shepherd; Teleplay by : Robert Doherty & Jon Harmon Feldman	March 18, 2004	1AHP12
Tru enters a beauty pageant in order to prevent the murder of a contestant. Davis shares an earth-shattering secret with Tru about the woman before her who also relived days.
14	14	"Daddy's Girl"	Jesús Salvador Treviño	Chris Levinson & Zack Estrin & Jon Harmon Feldman	March 25, 2004	1AHP13
Tru, still reeling from Davis' revelations about her mother, is further shocked when her cold, aloof father returns to town with his second wife and two children. The character Jack Harper is introduced.
15	15	"The Getaway"	Guy Bee	Story by : Scott Shepherd; Teleplay by : Stephanie Williams & Paula Yoo	April 1, 2004	1AHP14
A newspaper reporter has been struggling to discover Tru's secret by questioning her and Davis about why Tru is at the location of so many prevented crimes, and about Tru's seemingly psychic ability to know when trouble is going to happen. When she's killed and asks for help, Tru has to keep her safe while protecting her own secret.
16	16	"Two Pair"	Rick Rosenthal	Doris Egan	April 8, 2004	1AHP16
Tru has a mystery to solve when two bodies with seemingly no connection to each other both ask her for help. Jack tries to piece together the mystery of Davis' past. Davis finally reveals to Tru and Harrison his connection to their family.
17	17	"Death Becomes Her"	Michael Katleman	Robert Doherty	April 15, 2004	1AHP15
Carly Anders (special guest star Tamyra Gray), a famous movie star, befriends Tru while spending the day with her doing research for a job. Things abruptly take a turn for the worse when Carly dies and Tru must race to save her.
18	18	"Rear Window"	Michael Katleman; Paul Shapiro	William Sind	April 22, 2004	1AHP17
Tru must figure out who the identity thief is when two Chris Berensons enter her life. Davis and Tru discover Jack's secret.
19	19	"D.O.A."	Dan Lerner	Zack Estrin & Chris Levinson	April 29, 2004	1AHP18
Tru is initially overjoyed at the idea of having another person in the world who actually understands her burden – but she's horrified to find out that while she uses her power to try to save lives, Jack believes in a different path.
20	20	"Two Weddings and a Funeral"	Michael Katleman	Jon Harmon Feldman	April 29, 2004	1AHP19
As Lindsay's nuptials approach, Tru is torn apart when Harrison is murdered. Thankfully, Harrison asks for her help and the day rewinds – but Tru must fight to defend what she loves when every move she makes to save Harrison is opposed by Jack, leading to an explosive ending and a shocking secret.

=== Season 2 (2005) ===
No. overall	No. in season	Title	Directed by	Written by	Original release date	Prod. code
21	1	"Perfect Storm"	Michael Katleman	Jon Harmon Feldman	March 31, 2005	2AHP01
After the explosive events of the season one finale, Tru is relieved to have had two months of peace, during which time Davis pulled some strings and Tru began auditing med-school classes. Her life is once again turned upside down when Jack reappears, fighting to prevent Tru from saving a Harbor Patrol officer who drowned in a rescue attempt.
22	2	"Grace"	Dan Lerner	Doris Egan	March 31, 2005	2AHP02
The battle between Tru and Jack surges to dangerous new heights when Jack deviously frames Tru for the murder of the psychiatrist that Tru was trying to save, leaving her on the run from the law.
23	3	"In the Dark"	Rick Rosenthal	Jane Espenson	April 7, 2005	2AHP03
In an effort to cheer Tru up, Harrison gets Tru's new med-school friends and Davis to help him throw her a surprise birthday party at the morgue. Things quickly get complicated, however, when the lights surge out and somebody asks for Tru's help – but due to the dark, Tru has no idea who he was or what he looks like.
24	4	"The Last Good Day"	Michael Katleman	Richard Hatem	April 14, 2005	2AHP04
Tru and Jack have no idea how to react when a woman that Jack is interested in commits suicide and then asks him for help, causing both Tru and Jack to experience each other's powers and leading Tru to believe that Jack is meant to save her. A distraught Jack turns to Tru's father for advice.
25	5	"Enough"	Guy Bee	Robert Doherty	April 21, 2005	2AHP05
After her entanglements with Jack and the growing tension of fighting to save lives every day, Tru snaps when Jensen (Eric Christian Olsen) is killed in a robbery and his body doesn't ask for help. Jack tries to convince Tru of the wrongness of her actions as she desperately tries to outwit Fate by finding another body to ask for help so that her day will rewind and she can save Jensen.
26	6	"'Twas the Night Before Christmas... Again"	Jesús Salvador Treviño	Zack Estrin	Unaired	2AHP06
On Christmas Eve, Tru reluctantly finds herself working with Jack when an old cadaver asks for help, leaving her confused as to Jack's true motives. Harrison, believing his father is having an affair, accidentally catches Richard meeting with Jack, leading to disastrous consequences. Jensen begins to subtly act out of character since Tru subverted Fate by saving him.

== Cancellation ==
The series was canceled in 2005 due to low ratings. The final episode aired in many other territories before it screened in the US. The cancellation ended the series with multiple unresolved cliffhangers:

- Tru's season two romantic interest, a fellow medical student named Jensen, begins to remember moments of him and Tru together from the negated timeline where he was killed, causing him to obsess over death.
- Although initially highly antagonistic to Jack, Tru invites him to her Christmas get-together, hinting that he may in time become an ally against her father, Richard.
- Dr. Carrie Allen, the new psychologist at the morgue, who'd been revealed in earlier episodes as an agent of Jack's working to seduce and subvert Davis, is told the truth about Tru's power to rewind by Davis; Davis has yet to inform Tru.
- Jack, talking to Tru's father at her party, hints that he is still intent on making sure Jensen dies, despite having failed to seal his fated death in the previous episode.

=== Russian adaptation ===
The series has been adapted in Russia using the title Я отменяю смерть, pronounced as "Ja otmenjaju smertj'", and translated to I Revoke the Death, premiering in the country on TV-3 on October 9, 2012.

== Broadcast ==
The series completed airing in its entirety in New Zealand first. The second season began airing in the country on TV3 on February 4, 2005, with the final episode shown on March 11, 2005. After nearly a year-long hiatus in the U.S., new episodes began on Fox on March 31, 2005. However, the series was pulled again in favour of Fox's new show Point Pleasant and the final episode was screened in many other territories before it finally aired in the U.S. on January 21, 2008 on Syfy.

The complete series also aired in Argentina, Australia, Brazil, Bulgaria, Chile, Colombia, Croatia, Czech Republic, Denmark, France, Germany, Greece, Hong Kong, Hungary, Iceland, India, Ireland, Israel, Italy, Japan, Malaysia, Pakistan, Portugal, South Africa, Singapore, Slovakia and the United Kingdom.

It was first aired in Spain in 2005 in the FOX cable channel. In summer 2006 Tru Calling made its public debut in Antena 3 and was later moved to its secondary channel, Neox, where the show had several reruns during the following years.

== Home media ==
The Complete First Season
Set details				Special features
				Bonus Featurettes: "Finding The Calling: The Pilot"; "The Tru Path: Season One"; "Evil Comes Calling: A Late Season Twist"; Selected Episode Commentary; Deleted Scenes; "Somebody Help Me" Music Video by Full Blown Rose
	(United States) U.S. / Canada	United Kingdom	Australia	Bonus Featurettes: "Finding The Calling: The Pilot"; "The Tru Path: Season One"; "Evil Comes Calling: A Late Season Twist"; Selected Episode Commentary; Deleted Scenes; "Somebody Help Me" Music Video by Full Blown Rose
Episodes	20	—N/a	20	Bonus Featurettes: "Finding The Calling: The Pilot"; "The Tru Path: Season One"; "Evil Comes Calling: A Late Season Twist"; Selected Episode Commentary; Deleted Scenes; "Somebody Help Me" Music Video by Full Blown Rose
Aspect Ratio	1.78:1		1.78:1	Bonus Featurettes: "Finding The Calling: The Pilot"; "The Tru Path: Season One"; "Evil Comes Calling: A Late Season Twist"; Selected Episode Commentary; Deleted Scenes; "Somebody Help Me" Music Video by Full Blown Rose
Running Time	880 minutes		880 minutes	Bonus Featurettes: "Finding The Calling: The Pilot"; "The Tru Path: Season One"; "Evil Comes Calling: A Late Season Twist"; Selected Episode Commentary; Deleted Scenes; "Somebody Help Me" Music Video by Full Blown Rose
Audio	English (Dolby Digital Surround)		English (Dolby Digital Surround)	Bonus Featurettes: "Finding The Calling: The Pilot"; "The Tru Path: Season One"; "Evil Comes Calling: A Late Season Twist"; Selected Episode Commentary; Deleted Scenes; "Somebody Help Me" Music Video by Full Blown Rose
Subtitles	English, Spanish, French		None	Bonus Featurettes: "Finding The Calling: The Pilot"; "The Tru Path: Season One"; "Evil Comes Calling: A Late Season Twist"; Selected Episode Commentary; Deleted Scenes; "Somebody Help Me" Music Video by Full Blown Rose
No. of Discs	6		6	Bonus Featurettes: "Finding The Calling: The Pilot"; "The Tru Path: Season One"; "Evil Comes Calling: A Late Season Twist"; Selected Episode Commentary; Deleted Scenes; "Somebody Help Me" Music Video by Full Blown Rose
Region(s)	1 (NTSC)		2, 4 (PAL)	Bonus Featurettes: "Finding The Calling: The Pilot"; "The Tru Path: Season One"; "Evil Comes Calling: A Late Season Twist"; Selected Episode Commentary; Deleted Scenes; "Somebody Help Me" Music Video by Full Blown Rose
Rating	Not Rated		M	Bonus Featurettes: "Finding The Calling: The Pilot"; "The Tru Path: Season One"; "Evil Comes Calling: A Late Season Twist"; Selected Episode Commentary; Deleted Scenes; "Somebody Help Me" Music Video by Full Blown Rose
Release dates	November 30, 2004		August 9, 2005	Bonus Featurettes: "Finding The Calling: The Pilot"; "The Tru Path: Season One"; "Evil Comes Calling: A Late Season Twist"; Selected Episode Commentary; Deleted Scenes; "Somebody Help Me" Music Video by Full Blown Rose

The Complete Second Season
Set details				Special features
				Bonus Featurettes: "Tru Calling: Opposing Forces"
	Canada / United States	United Kingdom	Australia	Bonus Featurettes: "Tru Calling: Opposing Forces"
Episodes	6	—N/a	6	Bonus Featurettes: "Tru Calling: Opposing Forces"
Aspect Ratio	1.78:1		1.78:1	Bonus Featurettes: "Tru Calling: Opposing Forces"
Running Time	264 minutes		264 minutes	Bonus Featurettes: "Tru Calling: Opposing Forces"
Audio	English (Dolby Digital Surround)		English (Dolby Digital Surround)	Bonus Featurettes: "Tru Calling: Opposing Forces"
Subtitles	English, French, Spanish		None	Bonus Featurettes: "Tru Calling: Opposing Forces"
No. of Discs	2		2	Bonus Featurettes: "Tru Calling: Opposing Forces"
Region(s)	1 (NTSC)		2, 4 (PAL)	Bonus Featurettes: "Tru Calling: Opposing Forces"
Rating	Not Rated		M	Bonus Featurettes: "Tru Calling: Opposing Forces"
Release dates	November 15, 2005		August 9, 2005	Bonus Featurettes: "Tru Calling: Opposing Forces"

The Complete Series
Set details				Special features
				Bonus Featurettes: Selected Episode Commentary; Deleted Scenes; 4 Featurettes; "Finding The Calling: The Pilot"; "The Tru Path: Season One"; "Evil Comes Calling: A Late Season Twist"; "Tru Calling: Opposing Forces"; "Somebody Help Me" Music video by Full Blown Rose; Easter Egg: Zach Galifianakis' audition tape
	(United States) Canada / U.S.	United Kingdom	Australia	Bonus Featurettes: Selected Episode Commentary; Deleted Scenes; 4 Featurettes; "Finding The Calling: The Pilot"; "The Tru Path: Season One"; "Evil Comes Calling: A Late Season Twist"; "Tru Calling: Opposing Forces"; "Somebody Help Me" Music video by Full Blown Rose; Easter Egg: Zach Galifianakis' audition tape
Episodes	26	26	26	Bonus Featurettes: Selected Episode Commentary; Deleted Scenes; 4 Featurettes; "Finding The Calling: The Pilot"; "The Tru Path: Season One"; "Evil Comes Calling: A Late Season Twist"; "Tru Calling: Opposing Forces"; "Somebody Help Me" Music video by Full Blown Rose; Easter Egg: Zach Galifianakis' audition tape
Aspect Ratio	1.78:1	1.78:1	1.78:1	Bonus Featurettes: Selected Episode Commentary; Deleted Scenes; 4 Featurettes; "Finding The Calling: The Pilot"; "The Tru Path: Season One"; "Evil Comes Calling: A Late Season Twist"; "Tru Calling: Opposing Forces"; "Somebody Help Me" Music video by Full Blown Rose; Easter Egg: Zach Galifianakis' audition tape
Running Time	1094 Minutes	1094 Minutes	1094 Minutes	Bonus Featurettes: Selected Episode Commentary; Deleted Scenes; 4 Featurettes; "Finding The Calling: The Pilot"; "The Tru Path: Season One"; "Evil Comes Calling: A Late Season Twist"; "Tru Calling: Opposing Forces"; "Somebody Help Me" Music video by Full Blown Rose; Easter Egg: Zach Galifianakis' audition tape
Audio	English (Dolby Digital Surround)	English (Dolby Digital Surround)	English (Dolby Digital Surround)	Bonus Featurettes: Selected Episode Commentary; Deleted Scenes; 4 Featurettes; "Finding The Calling: The Pilot"; "The Tru Path: Season One"; "Evil Comes Calling: A Late Season Twist"; "Tru Calling: Opposing Forces"; "Somebody Help Me" Music video by Full Blown Rose; Easter Egg: Zach Galifianakis' audition tape
Subtitles	English, French, Spanish	English, Swedish	None	Bonus Featurettes: Selected Episode Commentary; Deleted Scenes; 4 Featurettes; "Finding The Calling: The Pilot"; "The Tru Path: Season One"; "Evil Comes Calling: A Late Season Twist"; "Tru Calling: Opposing Forces"; "Somebody Help Me" Music video by Full Blown Rose; Easter Egg: Zach Galifianakis' audition tape
No. of Discs	8	8	8	Bonus Featurettes: Selected Episode Commentary; Deleted Scenes; 4 Featurettes; "Finding The Calling: The Pilot"; "The Tru Path: Season One"; "Evil Comes Calling: A Late Season Twist"; "Tru Calling: Opposing Forces"; "Somebody Help Me" Music video by Full Blown Rose; Easter Egg: Zach Galifianakis' audition tape
Region(s)	1 (NTSC)	2, 4 (PAL)	4 (PAL)	Bonus Featurettes: Selected Episode Commentary; Deleted Scenes; 4 Featurettes; "Finding The Calling: The Pilot"; "The Tru Path: Season One"; "Evil Comes Calling: A Late Season Twist"; "Tru Calling: Opposing Forces"; "Somebody Help Me" Music video by Full Blown Rose; Easter Egg: Zach Galifianakis' audition tape
Rating	Not Rated	15	M	Bonus Featurettes: Selected Episode Commentary; Deleted Scenes; 4 Featurettes; "Finding The Calling: The Pilot"; "The Tru Path: Season One"; "Evil Comes Calling: A Late Season Twist"; "Tru Calling: Opposing Forces"; "Somebody Help Me" Music video by Full Blown Rose; Easter Egg: Zach Galifianakis' audition tape
Release dates	August 12, 2008	June 27, 2005	October 24, 2006	Bonus Featurettes: Selected Episode Commentary; Deleted Scenes; 4 Featurettes; "Finding The Calling: The Pilot"; "The Tru Path: Season One"; "Evil Comes Calling: A Late Season Twist"; "Tru Calling: Opposing Forces"; "Somebody Help Me" Music video by Full Blown Rose; Easter Egg: Zach Galifianakis' audition tape

== Reception ==
=== U.S. Nielsen ratings ===
Season	Timeslot	TV season	U.S. season premiere	U.S. season finale	Season rank	Viewers (in millions)
1	Thursdays at 8 p.m.	2003–2004	October 30, 2003	April 29, 2004	#151	4.50
2	Thursdays at 9 p.m.	2005 (Note: Only 5 of the 6 episodes were aired by Fox. The series finale was shown in the U.S. on Syfy in 2008 and is not part of the season's ratings. The second season originally aired in New Zealand from 4 February 2005 – 11 March 2005.)	March 31, 2005	April 21, 2005	#121	4.89

Notes

Each U.S. network television season begins in late September and ends in late May, which coincides with the completion of May sweeps.

== Awards and nominations ==
Accolades for Tru Calling
Year	Award	Category	Recipients	Result
2004	2004 Teen Choice Awards	Choice Breakout TV Show	Tru Calling	Nominated
2004	2004 Teen Choice Awards	Choice Breakout TV Star – Female	Eliza Dushku	Nominated
2004	30th Saturn Awards	Best Actress in a Television Series	Eliza Dushku	Nominated
