= Love Supreme =

Love Supreme or A Love Supreme may refer to:

== Music ==
- Love Supreme Jazz Festival, a annual event in England

=== Albums ===
- A Love Supreme, a 1965 album by John Coltrane
  - A Love Supreme: Live in Seattle, a 1965 recording by John Coltrane released in 2021
- A Love Supreme (Chanté Moore album)
- Love Supreme (The Supremes album), a 1988 compilation album by Diana Ross & the Supremes

=== Songs ===
- "A Love Supreme", a 1988 song by Will Downing
- "Love Supreme", a song by The Flower Kings from Instant Delivery
- "Love Supreme", a song by JS16
- "Love Supreme", a song by Nao from Saturn
- "Love Supreme", a song by Fhána

== Other uses ==
- "A Love Supreme" (Dollhouse), a 2009 television episode
- A Love Supreme (fanzine), a fanzine for supporters of Sunderland A.F.C.
