= Dollhouse season 2 =

Dollhouse
- Season 2
- Region 1 Season 2 DVD cover
- No. of episodes: 13

Release
- Original network: Fox
- Original release: September 25, 2009 – January 29, 2010

Season chronology
- ← Previous; Season 1

The second and final season of the television series Dollhouse premiered on September 25, 2009, on Fox and concluded its 13-episode season on January 29, 2010. The season aired on Fridays at 9:00 pm ET.

== Cast and characters ==
=== Main cast ===
- Eliza Dushku as Echo/Caroline Farrell
- Harry Lennix as Boyd Langton
- Fran Kranz as Topher Brink
- Tahmoh Penikett as Paul Ballard
- Enver Gjokaj as Victor/Anthony Ceccoli
- Dichen Lachman as Sierra/Priya Tsetsang
- Olivia Williams as Adelle DeWitt

=== Recurring cast ===
- Liza Lapira as Ivy
- Miracle Laurie as Mellie/November/Madelaine Costley
- Alexis Denisof as Senator Daniel Perrin
- Summer Glau as Bennett Halverson
- Amy Acker as Dr. Claire Saunders/Whiskey
- Keith Carradine as Matthew Harding
- Stacey Scowley as Cindy Perrin
- Maurissa Tancharoen as Kilo
- Philip Casnoff as Clive Ambrose
- Reed Diamond as Laurence Dominic
- Alan Tudyk as Alpha
- Vincent Ventresca as Nolan Kinnard

=== Guest ===
- Brett Claywell as Matt Cargill
- Felicia Day as Mag
- Patton Oswalt as Joel Mynor
- Adair Tishler as Little Caroline
- Zack Ward as Zone

== Episodes ==
No. overall	No. in season	Title	Directed by	Written by	Original release date	Prod. code	US viewers (millions)
14	1	"Vows"	Joss Whedon	Joss Whedon	September 25, 2009	2APK01	2.56
It's been nearly five months since Alpha's escape, and Echo is back to work, seemingly wiped of all 36 personalities Alpha imprinted her with. Ballard must deal with his growing feelings for Echo as he uses the Dollhouse for his own ends, hiring Echo on a long-term engagement as the 'wife' of major arms dealer Martin Klar (Jamie Bamber), whom Ballard could never capture during his days in the FBI. The engagement becomes complicated when Echo, struck by Klar in a jealous rage after he discovers her "cheating" on him with Ballard, begins to glitch, losing not only her current imprint but recalling past ones. Ballard saves the day by invoking the assassin imprint he encountered in "Man on the Street," allowing both of them to fight their way out. DeWitt invites Paul to become Echo's handler, pointing out that he noticed Echo's glitching before her current handler did, and when he finds out that Echo has reached self-awareness even in her blank state, he agrees. Subplots include Claire Saunders' inability to handle the knowledge that she was once the number one Active, Whiskey, before being repurposed by Topher, taking her rage out on him before fleeing the Dollhouse permanently, and the introduction of Senator Daniel Perrin (Alexis Denisof), who begins a public investigation of the Rossum Corporation.
15	2	"Instinct"	Marita Grabiak	Michele Fazekas & Tara Butters	October 2, 2009	2APK03	2.09
Echo is imprinted as Emily Jordan, mother to a newborn baby, Jack, and Topher has outdone himself by imprinting her so deeply that she has even begun to lactate. But Emily is pushing herself hard, and when she finds pictures in her husband Nathan (Kristoffer Polaha)'s desk of him with another woman, she begins to suspect him of having an affair. The truth is that the woman, Karen, is Jack's biological mother, who died birthing her, and whom Echo is meant to think she is, and Nate decides to call off the engagement. Unfortunately, Emily interprets the situation as an attempt to kill her... and, even when wiped, Echo remains attached to Jack, giving him up only when Nathan explains the entire situation. Meanwhile, Ballard has to confront his own confused feelings when DeWitt brings Madeline Costley – the former November (Miracle Laurie) – back to the Dollhouse for a diagnostic, and Perrin deepens his investigation into the Dollhouse with the help of his wife Cindy (Stacey Scowley).
16	3	"Belle Chose"	David Solomon	Tim Minear	October 9, 2009	2APK02	2.25
While Echo is engaged by a college professor (Arye Gross) as nubile student Kiki, Terry Karrens (Joe Sikora), nephew of Rossum Corporation benefactor Bradley Karrens (Michael Hogan), is struck by a car near Beverly Hills and left comatose. While mapping his brain in an attempt to figure out if he'll recover, Topher discovers signs that Terry is either a serial killer or about to become one, and Bradley admits that he is trying to revive Terry quickly so that his latest victims can be rescued. Instead, Victor is imprinted with his personality and former FBI Agent Paul Ballard interviews him, but before anyone can get a location from him, Bradley frees him, after which Victor/Terry incapacitates his uncle and resumes the hunt for a new "Aunt Sheila." At Adelle's urging, Topher attempts a remote wipe on Victor, which ends up flipping imprints: while Victor becomes Kiki, showing off "her" dance moves amused bystanders, Echo becomes Terry and returns to "his" hideout. Only Echo's intervention, fighting the Terry imprint, allows Dollhouse teams to save the captured women.
17	4	"Belonging"	Jonathan Frakes	Maurissa Tancharoen & Jed Whedon	October 23, 2009	2APK04	2.15
Flashbacks show Sierra's original identity as Priya Tsetsang, a gifted artist who is being pressured romantically by a man named Nolan; her admission into the Dollhouse was predicated on Topher developing a cure for her persistent and overwhelming schizophrenia. In the present day, Dr. Nolan Kinnard (Vincent Ventresca), Rossum Corporation's premier neuroleptics specialist, demands Sierra be imprinted with a love-slave personality and loaned to him permanently, while Topher realizes that Priya never had schizophrenia but was instead medicated into that state by Kinnard. Adelle, though torn at the thought of sending Priya to "a raping scumbag one tick shy of a murderer," finally decides to comply with the order. Topher finds a solution by sending Kinnard Priya – undrugged, non-schizophrenic, and furious. Kinnard attacks her and is slain; Boyd and Topher help dispose of the body and manufacture evidence that Kinnard has fled the country. Priya, though scarred by the day's events, agrees to resume her contract with the Dollhouse after seeing Victor and realizing that their love for each other transcends even wiping; the episode's final shot depicts them asleep in the same pod, arm-in-arm. Echo displays the ability to read, which Boyd warns her to hide; she warns Langton of a coming storm that could wipe them all out, stating her intention to help everyone survive, and when Boyd returns her book she discovers an all-access keycard hidden inside, "for the storm."
18	5	"The Public Eye"	David Solomon	Andrew Chambliss	December 4, 2009	2APK05	2.15
United States Senator Daniel Perrin has been trying to bring down the Dollhouse for months, but he becomes much more of a threat when he comes into possession of a material witness: Madeline Costley. High-ranking Rossum executive Matthew Harding (Keith Carradine) orders the staff of the LA Dollhouse to do nothing, claiming Rossum has enough dirt on Perrin to keep him quiet; Echo is the one to point out what it is: Cindy, Perrin's wife, appears to be a Doll herself, presumably of the same "sleeper" variety Madeline herself was. While Echo is imprinted as "Bree," a hooker who discredits Perrin by creating a celebrity sex tape of the two of them together, Adelle asks Ballard to kidnap Madeline against the fear that Cindy will be ordered to kill her. Topher gives him a "disruptor," a device that will incapacitate a Doll... but when Paul uses it on Cindy, she remains unfazed while Perrin breaks down. Perrin, the careless-playboy member of a political dynasty, was "upgraded" by Rossum with ambition and drive; Cindy is his handler. He and Echo, now awakened to their true natures, try to escape, but they are captured by Cindy and taken to the Washington, D.C. Dollhouse and its head programmer, Bennett Halverson (Summer Glau), a socially awkward young woman with a permanently paralyzed left arm. Bennett, upon seeing Echo, recognizes her as Caroline Farrell, and then begins to torture her. Ballard is unable to sway Madeline from her decision, and she goes to testify to the Senate. Adelle determines that the LA Dollhouse is being framed and resolves to stop Rossum.
19	6	"The Left Hand"	Wendey Stanzler	Tracy Bellomo	December 4, 2009	2APK06	1.99
Bennett reveals that she and Caroline were once friends, and uploads a memory of Caroline's betrayal, in which she left Bennett trapped under debris after an explosion. Meanwhile, Adelle and Topher travel to the D.C. Dollhouse, where Adelle matches wits with its head of household, Stewart Lipman (Ray Wise), and Topher tries to gain access to Perrin's brain scans and unravel the plot. To aid in this, Topher has imprinted Victor with Topher's own personality (a performance which earned Enver Gjokaj widespread critical acclaim). Perrin escapes with Echo into the real world, determined to bring down Rossum and expose everything, with Cindy in hot pursuit. Adelle meets with Lipman, who reveals Perrin will have Rossum vindicated at the Senate hearings and attack their competitors so that Rossum will be unopposed and given free political rein. Bennett and Topher, though distracted by a mutual (if extremely awkward) infatuation with each other, adapt Topher's incapacitating device to remotely knock out Dolls based on their unique brain scans, and Bennett surreptitiously programs Perrin to kill Echo. Topher knocks Bennett out and overrides the programming with help from Victor/Topher, but not until after Perrin kills Cindy. Perrin then shows up at the hearing late and reveals his wife is dead; he pronounces Rossum a good corporation who has been set up by their immoral competitors, that there is no Dollhouse, and that Madeline Costley is a disturbed woman who was in a mental institution in Canada. Madeline is forced back into service against her will at the D.C. Dollhouse. Back in LA, Topher reveals that Perrin could never turn against Rossum, and DeWitt speculates that Rossum is likely grooming him to be the next President of the United States. Echo is loose in the world at large, Ballard has not checked in recently, and Rossum appears ascendant...
20	7	"Meet Jane Doe"	Dwight Little	Maurissa Tancharoen & Jed Whedon & Andrew Chambliss	December 11, 2009	2APK07	2.72
After escaping into the world at large, over the course of three months Echo has finished evolving into a full personality, able to access any of her nearly forty imprints at will. She and Paul Ballard train together to take down Rossum, running a "practice test" by breaking into a prison and freeing a woman (Ana Claudia Talancón) whom Echo accidentally got imprisoned earlier in her adventures. Echo reveals that she has fallen in love with Paul, who returns her feelings but out of a sense of honor won't allow himself to act on them. Back at the Dollhouse, meanwhile, DeWitt has been demoted and Harding has taken over. Topher unveils remote wipe tech he had been designing for Rossum. Topher later reveals to Adelle in confidence that he discovered Rossum's intent to create a machine to imprint anyone, anywhere, and that he figured out how to build it. Adelle betrays Topher's trust and gives the technology to Rossum to regain control of the Dollhouse. Echo and Ballard return to the Dollhouse as the next step in their plan to bring it down.
21	8	"A Love Supreme"	David Straiton	Jenny DeArmitt	December 11, 2009	2APK08	2.13
Echo's previous romantic engagements begin to surface as murder victims one by one. Alpha (guest star Alan Tudyk) has returned with his murderous obsession with Echo to seek his revenge. DeWitt begins to grow increasingly suspicious of Ballard. Echo, Ballard and Langton recruit Topher into their conspiracy to take down the Dollhouse. Alpha shows up in Adelle's office and reveals that Ballard and Echo were together through those three missing months. Alpha uses an upgraded piece of technology from "Gray Hour" to make the dolls turn on the Dollhouse staff and captures Ballard, who he feels is the only real competition he has for Echo's affections. Topher and Langton manage to restore order with Topher's new remote wipe technology but not before Alpha imprints himself with Ballard and tortures Ballard to the point of causing permanent brain damage, leaving Paul in a vegetative state. Echo fights Alpha and Ballard's mind takes over for a moment, begging her to kill him. She is unable to kill Paul, however, and Alpha, shaken, regains control and runs from the Dollhouse. Echo is seen with Ballard, who is on life support machines.
22	9	"Stop-Loss"	Felix Alcalá	Andrew Chambliss	December 18, 2009	2APK09	2.10
Victor's contract with the Dollhouse expires, and he is returned to his true personality: Anthony Ceccoli, a former Army Ranger who signed a contract with the Dollhouse to cure him of a severe case of post-traumatic stress disorder. Echo confronts Sierra with the knowledge that Victor will not be coming home, which causes Sierra considerable distress as she declares that Victor "isn't ready to be alone yet." Anthony is captured by a group of military personnel. When DeWitt passes out drunk at her desk, Boyd engages Echo's help to track down Anthony, only to discover a new arm in the Rossum conspiracy: they have engaged Anthony as one of many ex-Actives (including some of Anthony's ex-Army teammates) in a plot to create the perfect team of super-soldiers, who use "neural radio" to think the same thoughts and share each other's minds. Echo imprints Sierra with her original personality, Priya, and together they free Anthony, whose love for Priya/Sierra overrides the "group think" of Rossum's army; Echo then gives herself the same implant as the super-soldiers and overwhelms the unit with her over-50-minds-in-one. But DeWitt captures her rogue Actives after their escape, and consigns all three of them to the Attic.
23	10	"The Attic"	John Cassaday	Maurissa Tancharoen & Jed Whedon	December 18, 2009	2APK10	2.10
Echo, Priya and Anthony are placed in The Attic, suspended in a permanent dream-state where they must continuously relive their worst nightmares. Echo overcomes hers – an inability to save those she loves – but is promptly attacked by a shadow-killer named Arcane, and then saved by Laurence Dominic (Season 1 regular Reed Diamond), who has also gained control of himself within the Attic. Arcane is killing off Attic residents, and they jump into different minds to stop him: Anthony is back in the War in Afghanistan fighting himself in insurgent guise (played by Gjokaj's twin brother Demir), while Priya trysts with an Anthony who transforms into an undead Nolan Kinnard. Together, they trap Arcane, revealing his true identity: Clyde Randolph (Adam Godley), co-founder of Rossum, whose partner turned on him and placed him in the Attic in 1993. He explains that the Attic networks its victims' brains into a super-computer, each kept in a perpetually adrenaline-drenched state for peak efficiency; Arcane's killing spree has served the dual purpose of sparing Attic prisoners and reducing Rossum's processing power. Clyde has also been able to conquer his worst fear — the desolate, blasted future of "Epitaph One" — but has realized that, if Rossum continues on its present course, there is a 97% chance that it will become reality. Echo, Priya and Anthony escape the Attic, while Dominic and Clyde voluntarily remain behind. Meanwhile, Topher, Boyd and Ivy, working against DeWitt's seemingly tyrannical reign, embark on a radical plan to save Paul Ballard. It is then revealed that DeWitt sent Echo to the Attic in order to retrieve information on how to stop Rossum, and that Caroline Farrell knows who Clyde's partner, the only remaining founder of Rossum, is. DeWitt, Ballard, Echo, Priya, Boyd, Topher, Ivy and Anthony join forces to defeat Rossum, but Echo declares that they need one last person on their team: Caroline.
24	11	"Getting Closer"	Tim Minear	Tim Minear	January 8, 2010	2APK11	2.38
The primary wedge containing Caroline's mind is found to be missing. Adelle has Bennett Halverson (Glau) kidnapped to aid Topher in repairing Caroline's backup wedge, which Alpha damaged in "Briar Rose". November, who was placed in the D.C. Dollhouse, is brought back with Bennett. A series of flashbacks reveal that Caroline became a terrorist and a freedom fighter working against Rossum for two years, and that Bennett voluntarily joined her; Bennett's maiming was an accident, and Caroline abandoned her to draw off Rossum pursuit and allow Bennett to portray herself as an innocent victim. It is revealed that Boyd now has a romantic relationship with Dr. Claire Saunders (Acker), who returns to the Dollhouse at his request. While all the LA Dolls are restored to their original personalities and sent home, and Priya and Anthony flee (with Echo's blessing) for one last night together, Topher and Bennett repair the Caroline wedge and share a first kiss... followed by Dr. Saunders proving that she is a sleeper Active by shooting Bennett through the head. As Rossum strike teams breach the Dollhouse, Topher finishes the repairs on Caroline's wedge and Echo downloads its contents, which reveal the identities of Rossum's leaders: the current incarnation of Clyde, the so-called "Clyde 2.0," and the co-founder of the Rossum Corporation... Boyd Langton.
25	12	"The Hollow Men"	Terrence O'Hara	Michele Fazekas & Tara Butters & Tracy Bellomo	January 15, 2010	2APK12	2.09
As the group leaves for Tucson to take down Rossum, Boyd attempts to sabotage their efforts by drugging Echo. Boyd uses Topher's trust to serve Rossum's agenda by tricking Topher into finishing his remote wipe/imprinting technology. Anthony and Priya, who were told in the previous episode to spend their last night together, return to the Dollhouse and discover that Boyd has been betraying them all along. Boyd reveals that he has spared the group's lives because he loves them like family. Caroline has a special genetic trait, expressed in her spinal fluid, which allows her to survive the wipes. Boyd watched over Echo and allowed her to be pushed to her limits in order to allow her to form a complete personality, as every time she "survives" a wipe the gene's expression grows stronger, allowing for Rossum to create a "cure" for wiping. Boyd activates Mellie's sleeper programming and she assaults Paul, but is able to fight it off long enough to tell Paul that she loves him, and then kill herself. Echo manages to fight off Clyde 2.0, now in the body of Whiskey, before having her final confrontation with Boyd. Topher wins the ensuing fight by hitting Boyd with the mind-wipe tech he created and hates, and Echo uses the now-Dollstate Boyd as a suicide bomber to destroy Rossum's headquarters. Echo and Paul have saved the world... but the episode's epilogue depicts them fleeing through the apocalyptic future of "Epitaph One."
26	13	"Epitaph Two: Return"	David Solomon	Maurissa Tancharoen & Jed Whedon & Andrew Chambliss	January 29, 2010	2APK13	2.16
In the year 2020, one year after the events of "Epitaph One", Echo and her team rescue Topher and the last of the Actuals (guest stars Felicia Day, Adair Tishler, and Zack Ward) from the hands of the Rossum Corporation after he reveals that he can restore the world to order. After reuniting with Tony, who is a tech-head, Echo and her team race to Los Angeles, which is now a war zone. They fight their way in through the butchers, mindless killing machines, and Paul Ballard is killed. Echo breaks down, and Priya and Tony argue about why they are no longer together. Alpha (guest star Alan Tudyk) returns and reveals that he has taken over the Dollhouse and is using it as a refuge for wiped beings, reformed from his past. Tony renounces the tech, and Priya reveals that her son T is Tony's son and is named after his father. Topher uses help from recordings of Bennett Halverson (guest star Summer Glau), and sacrifices his own life to detonate the wiping signal into the ionosphere, dispersing it over the world and restoring everyone's mind to order. DeWitt begins the clean-up process as Tony, Priya and T reunite as a family. Echo finds one final gift from the imprinting technology and downloads Paul's personality within her. With the memory of her lover literally living inside of her, Echo settles down to sleep in her old sleep pod to dream of Paul and of a world restored to sanity with a smile on her face.

== Production ==
Fox renewed Dollhouse for a second season, although the show received a dramatic budget cut. For this reason, four out of the seven lead actors do not appear in every episode of the season. Harry Lennix and Enver Gjokaj are both absent from two, while Tahmoh Penikett and Dichen Lachman are both absent from three. Amy Acker, whom Joss Whedon had intended to be a prominent component of the season, only appeared in three episodes due to the budget cut and her commitment to the short lived series, Happy Town.

The series upgraded from 35 mm film to HD digital film for this season and shot much of the footage using hand held cameras, in the style of "Epitaph One". Joss Whedon, creator of the show, states on his audio commentary for "Vows" that shooting went so much faster than usual, due in part to the use of HD cameras and hand held direction, that his line producer, Kelly Manners, would often be; "scrambling for something to do."

The show also acquired a new cinematographer for the season, Lisa Wiegand, who removed much of the over head lighting present in the first season to give the series a more cinematic look.

Whedon had originally intended to film scenes of the apocalyptic future from "Epitaph One" throughout the season but under the opinion of both the studio and network decided to drop the idea—instead having the series finale be entirely set in said storyline. He in fact filmed scenes starring the three actors (Felicia Day, Zack Ward and Adair Tishler) for the first episode but these were later added to the beginning of "Epitaph Two: Return" because, as Whedon notes; "We didn't have the money to shoot an entire episode."

Fox failed to air the series during November "sweeps period" and instead aired back to back episodes of the series for the first three weeks in December ending with episode ten "The Attic". This decision sparked rumor amongst fans and critics that Fox was indeed intending to cancel the show (a threat present since the first season) and despite an increase in critical acclaim throughout the season, Fox canceled the show after the fourth episode aired, citing declining ratings as the reason.

The remaining three episodes aired in January with the series finale held back a week due to the Hope for Haiti charity telethon.

=== Crew ===
Series creator Joss Whedon continued to serve as executive producer and showrunner. Michelle Fazekas and Tara Butters joined as consulting producers, replacing Elizabeth Craft and Sarah Fain, and wrote the second and penultimate episodes of the show; "Instinct" and "The Hollow Men". Whedon wrote and directed the season premiere "Vows" but is not credited with either writing or directing any other episode of the show. Tim Minear, promoted to executive producer, again wrote two episodes ("Belle Chose" and "Getting Closer") and directed the latter. Tracey Bellomo and Andrew Chambliss remained with the show and were promoted to story editors. Each wrote or co-wrote two and four episodes respectively while Maurissa Tancharoen and Jed Whedon (also promoted to story editors) wrote or co-wrote the remainder of the episodes including; "Belonging", "Meet Jane Doe", "The Attic" and the series finale "Epitaph Two: Return". Jenny DeArmit, the writer's assistant during the first season, wrote the episode "A Love Supreme".

David Solomon was promoted to executive producer and again directed the highest number of episodes of the season, directing three out of the thirteen including the series finale. Comic book artist John Cassaday, who has worked closely with Whedon when he wrote the Astonishing X-Men arc for Marvel Comics, directed the tenth episode of the season. Other directors included Marita Grabiak, Jonathan Frakes, Wendey Stanzler, David Straiton, Felix Alcalá, Terrence O'Hara and Dwight Little.

Eliza Dushku and Kelly A. Manners again acted as producer and line producer respectively.

Ross Berryman, who was the show's cinematographer for the first season, was replaced by Lisa Wiegand.

== Home video releases ==
Dollhouse: Season Two was released on DVD and Blu-ray in region 1 on October 12, 2010 and in region 2 October 11, 2010. It includes all 13 episodes on a 4-disc DVD set and a 3-disc Blu-ray set presented in anamorphic widescreen 1.78:1 aspect ratio. Special features include three commentary tracks—"Vows" by Joss Whedon; "Belonging" by Maurissa Tancharoen and Jed Whedon; and "Getting Closer" by Tim Minear, which is Blu-ray exclusive. Featurettes include, "Defining Moments", a look at the second season; and "Looking Back", a discussion with Joss Whedon and several cast members as they reminisce about the show. Also included are series outtakes and deleted scenes from various episodes.
