= Instinct (Dollhouse) =

- Dollhouse episode
- Episode no.: Season 2 Episode 2
- Directed by: Marita Grabiak
- Written by: Michele Fazekas; Tara Butters
- Production code: 2APK03
- Original air date: October 2, 2009

Episode chronology
← Previous "Vows"	Next → "Belle Chose"
- Dollhouse (season 2)

"Instinct" is the second episode of the second season of the American science fiction television series Dollhouse and the show's 15th episode overall. The episode was written by Michele Fazekas and Tara Butters and directed by Marita Grabiak, the first in the series she has directed. It aired in the United States on Fox on October 2, 2009.

In this episode, Echo has been imprinted as a mother of a child. However Topher has managed to change Echo on a glandular level, giving Echo strong maternal instincts. This unfortunately causes Echo to be paranoid causing her to kidnap the child. Ballard not only has to find Echo, but is forced to face his past as Madeline Costley, known to Ballard as Mellie, comes back into the Dollhouse for a diagnostic.

== Plot ==
The episode starts with Ballard walking into Topher's office inspecting the chair. Topher walks in and they discuss Echo's current engagement. Topher notes that he has just opened up a new world to imprinting. By making changes to the brain, he can theoretically program it to fight cancer or even be telekinetic.

On engagement, Echo wakes up in the middle of night, to breastfeed "her" child. In the morning, Echo wakes up and proceeds to take Jack (the baby) downstairs for breakfast. Her husband, Nate who has been working in his home office comes out and is about to leave for work. It is clear that Nate is not prepared to be a father as he is reluctant to hold Jack, while Echo makes coffee. As Echo sees Nate off to work, she notices a black van parked across the street.

In the park, Sierra is on the same engagement acting as one of Echo's friends. Echo tells Sierra about Nate's shortcomings as a father and believes he is having an affair or is engaged in illegal activities. Sierra chalks it up to hormones, but Echo express her paranoia at the black van parked across the street. Sierra tells Echo she is sleep deprived and she needs a good nights rest.

Back at home, Echo is unable to let it go, and begins to rummage through Nate's home office. When Nate comes home, Echo asks Nate "who she is?" referring to some photos she found in Nate's office. Nate tells Echo that she was a former lover, but has since died and apologizes for keeping it from Echo. Nate tells Echo to go to sleep and he will take Jack tonight. But she wakes up in the middle of the night and overhears Nate telling someone on the phone to "get rid of her" and he will get rid of the baby.

At Perrin's residence, Perrin discusses the lack of evidence he has against Rossum with his wife. The doorbell rings and Perrin's wife goes to answer the door. However no one was there and she brings Perrin a stack of documents left at the doorstep.

DeWitt goes to visit Madeline formerly November/Mellie. DeWitt attempts to engage Madeline in idle conversation, but Madeline is suspicious of DeWitt's intentions. DeWitt asks Madeline to come in for a diagnostic, saying she will not take "no" for an answer.

On the engagement, Echo attempts to flee the house with Jack. Nate tries to prevent Echo from leaving, telling her that her car is in the shop with the baby seat. He takes the baby and tells Echo to go get some rest, but she takes Jack back, saying she needs to feed him. Echo calls Sierra to pick her up. However, as she arrives, so does the black van and Echo watches as Sierra is taken into it. Dollhouse staff surround the house as Ballard tries to go inside to talk Echo down. But she manages to escape in Sierra's car.

In the Dollhouse, Nate is furious with DeWitt. But DeWitt is unmoved and says that with the money Nate has, he could have hired a nanny, but he wanted a mother, someone to bond with his child.

Echo attempts to go to the bank to withdraw money. However she spots the black van and runs. Echo is able to find some police officers who take her back to the station to get her statement. Ballard and Nate arrives, and Echo attempts to flee. Echo is hysterical as Jack is taken away from her.

In the Dollhouse, Madeline is receiving her diagnostic. As they finish, Ballard brings Echo in and attempts to place her in the chair. Echo manages to escape but is cornered and sedated. Ballard notices Madeline is cut, and takes her to see the doctor. Madeline tells Ballard that Echo will be fine, as she knows how it feels to have a child taken away. She reveals that she had a baby daughter, who died of cancer. Ballard asks if Madeline is happy now, to which she replies she is not sad. Echo wakes up and is wiped. However the wipe seems to fail, as Echo punches Topher, knocking him unconscious.

Perrin goes through the documents that were given to him. He realizes the illegal activities that Rossum is engaged in. Perrin's wife says they must follow through with this.

Echo manages to escape the Dollhouse. In DeWitt's office, Topher tries to explain what has happened. Ballard believes that Echo is going to get the baby. DeWitt wonders how it is possible as Echo was wiped. Ballard believes it is because Topher changed her at a glandular level, so a normal wipe is not strong enough. Topher agrees and notes that triggering lactation was a step too far. DeWitt orders Ballard to retrieve Echo.

At the house, Nate goes to make a bottle of milk for Jack. DeWitt calls Nate telling him to leave the house now, however the power is shortly cut due to a storm. Nate goes back to the bedroom, but Jack has been already taken. As Nate runs back downstairs, he sees Echo holding the baby and a knife. Nate tries to talk Echo down, but Echo is infuriated when Nate tells her that she is not the real mother. Nate apologizes for making Echo love Jack and then taking him away. Nate tries to talk Echo down again as Ballard arrives. Nate is successful, as Echo hands Jack back to him and walks away.

Ballard follows Echo to a park. Echo tells Ballard that she does not remember her engagements, but she does remember the feelings associated with each engagement, such as love, pain and fear. She notes that it is not pretend for her. Ballard offers to tell Topher what is happening and fix it so she doesn't feel like she does now. Echo says it would be worse that way. She is awake now and doesn't want to go back to sleep. The episode ends with Ballard sitting next to Echo on the park bench.

== Reception ==
=== Reviews ===
Rachel Reitsleff from iF Magazine said the episode had a huge flaw citing that "one can see where the work required by the viewer to put together what we're being told about Echo's evolution could be downright daunting to anyone tuning in for the first time." She also notes that it is extremely hard to relate to the series saying "the arc and standalone elements don't complement each other very well in 'Instinct' – we are told that Echo's recent experiences are having an effect on her, but we don't yet see that effect." Eric Goldman of IGN gave the episode a 7. He said, "after that jarring beginning, this turned out to be a somewhat lackluster installment, which unfortunately once again brought up some of the show's problems." He notes that there is no real investment into the characters citing that "even learning that Echo is now remembering everything after an engagement doesn't change the fact that when she's in the midst of an engagement, she is apparently still not herself."
