= Belonging (Dollhouse) =

- Dollhouse episode
- Topher finds Priya after the confrontation with Nolan.
- Episode no.: Season 2 Episode 4
- Directed by: Jonathan Frakes
- Written by: Maurissa Tancharoen; Jed Whedon
- Production code: 2APK04
- Original air date: October 23, 2009

Guest appearances
- Vincent Ventresca; Keith Carradine; Clyde Kusatsu

Episode chronology
← Previous "Belle Chose"	Next → "The Public Eye"
- Dollhouse (season 2)

"Belonging" is the fourth episode of the second season of the American science fiction television series Dollhouse and the show's 17th episode overall. The episode was written by Maurissa Tancharoen and Jed Whedon and directed by Jonathan Frakes, his sole credit in the series. It aired in the United States on Fox on October 23, 2009.

This episode delves into the past of the character Priya Tsetsang/Sierra, showing how she was forced to become a doll, and can be seen as a prelude to the ethical dilemma of permanent imprinting first explored in "Epitaph One". This episode also explores Echo's continuing evolution in her tabula rasa state.

== Plot ==
The episode starts with a blurry shot of Topher panicked and covered in blood, repeating over and over, "I was just trying to help her." There is then a flashback to one year before: Priya is working on the beachside selling paintings. Nolan (first seen in "Needs" as Sierra's abusive client) talks to Priya about her artwork, and encourages her to make him a piece. She agrees, with another artist encouraging her to pursue Nolan romantically.

Later, Nolan is entertaining guests in his home, showing off the commissioned piece by Priya. Echo is on the engagement, talking Nolan up, and Victor is programmed as an Italian art dealer to further enhance Nolan's reputation. This backfires: Despite Victor's praises of Nolan, Priya is far more interested in Victor, who seems to understand and share her artistic passion. Confronted by Nolan at his front door, Priya rejects his increasingly threatening advances and leaves.

Back in the present day, Sierra is leaving Nolan's place after an engagement. He takes a photo of Sierra with Priya's Polaroid camera, and leaves the picture in a drawer alongside multitudes of others from prior engagements.

Back in the Dollhouse, Sierra is painting. She paints a bird surrounded by a threatening black shape. Victor points this out, and Sierra says that, although she doesn't like the color black, she uses it "because it is always there". Echo senses something is wrong, and ultimately takes the painting to Topher, telling him Sierra is being affected by a bad man. Topher initially rebuffs this but, at Echo's insistence, decides to look into it.

Topher goes to Boyd and asks about the client. Boyd is amused at Topher's interest, but gives him information anyway. Topher mentions he helped Sierra, as when she came to the house she was a paranoid schizophrenic. Boyd is curious about Topher's request, and Topher mentions Echo gave him the painting saying something was wrong. At Boyd's direction, Topher examines the absent Dr. Saunders' notes: she initially came to the conclusion that the black "blob" was Topher himself shown as a symbolic force of darkness. Meanwhile, Victor is taking all the black paint from the tables so Sierra would not have to use them anymore. Echo helping Victor in this matter has raised Boyd's curiosity.

Topher has his doubts about Sierra/Priya and he re-examines Priya's original brain scan. He comes to the conclusion that Priya was made to look like she was a paranoid schizophrenic by the psychological drugs that were in her system. In a second, previously uncharacteristic surge of ethical concern, Topher tells Boyd and debates whether to tell DeWitt—who overhears. DeWitt summons Nolan and declares him banished from the Dollhouse's services; he responds by demanding Sierra forever, saying that if she fails to deliver, he will use his Rossum connections to have her fired. In the Dollhouse, Boyd continues to supervise Echo and notices her pulling a leaf off a plant.

DeWitt converses with Mr. Harding of the Rossum Corporation. He tells her to do as Nolan says. She protests, but Harding points out her past indiscretions with Victor under the pseudonym "Miss Lonelyhearts". Harding says that her use of Victor for personal reasons is the least of her indiscretions, and tells her once again to do as Nolan says. Back in the Dollhouse, Victor is trying to wash away all the black paint in the shower. Sierra spots this and they share a moment where they paint each other's faces with the black paint. However, Victor has a flashback of his time as a soldier upon seeing Sierra's face, and collapses with Sierra holding him, saying that he doesn't want to take charge.

DeWitt orders Topher to imprint Sierra. She tells him that everyone in the Dollhouse was chosen because they were morally compromised, but Topher was chosen because of his lack of morals: he sees people as toys, and will need to let this "toy" go. Adelle then calls Boyd to make sure the order is done. Boyd searches Echo's pod and finds the leaf used as a bookmark for a novel she has been reading. He leaves to carry out Adelle's order. However, as the pod closes, it is revealed that Echo has etched phrases into the inside of the glass in order to help her remember.

In a flashback, the Dollhouse is looking for a new Sierra. Adelle tells Topher that a 22-year-old paranoid schizophrenic is the target. Topher goes to a mental health facility (run by Nolan) to take Priya to the Dollhouse. Priya states that she has been kidnapped by the facility, and is being poisoned in order to make her crazy. Topher thinks this is a part of her condition, and takes her into the Dollhouse where she becomes Sierra. Back in the present, Topher then imprints Sierra "for the last time" and sends her to Nolan. As Topher puts away the wedge that contains Priya's original memory, Adelle tries to comfort Topher by telling him he had no choice. Boyd is now having a confrontation with Echo. He asks her about the leaf acting as a bookmark, as well as the book she has been reading. Echo tries to shrug this off, but Boyd asks her when she learned to lie. Boyd tries to warn Echo about her behavior and how she is pushing the staff and other Actives. Echo replies that a storm is coming, and the actives need to wake up because she wants everyone to survive.

Sierra is now at Nolan's place. However, she soon reveals that she is not his fantasy imprint but rather Priya, aware of what he has done but without the specific memories of her imprints. Nolan tries to rationalize gaslighting her by drugging her into insanity and helping to force her into the Dollhouse against her will so that he could sexually assault her repeatedly by claiming that in all of her imprints she enjoyed every second they had together. But Priya mocks him, calling him out for his brainwashing and saying she doesn't remember any time when she liked him and that she actually fell in love with somebody else, though she cannot remember who. The confrontation gets heated and Nolan attacks her with a knife. However, she knocks him down, making him drop his knife, and grabs it before he can reach it; enraged, she stabs him to death.

Topher and Boyd arrive shortly afterwards and begin covering up Nolan's death. Boyd instructs Sierra to pack a suitcase of Nolan's belongings as if he had run away, while he and Topher dispose of the body. Topher says he was just trying to help her (start of the episode) and Boyd replies that it did not go well. Boyd makes a phone tell, telling he needs someone disappeared; he then tells Adelle that Nolan left in a hurry without taking Sierra with him. Adelle seems pleased.

Priya, back in the Dollhouse, is talking to Topher. She says she woke up from a nightmare only to live through another one. Topher apologizes, saying he was fooled. She spots Victor and asks if her love for him is real. Topher confirms it, adding that Victor loves her back. Priya then voluntarily gets into the chair to be wiped. Topher expresses his regret in not just sending her away, but she says she would have confronted Nolan anyway. She then asks Topher to spare her the memories of this day if she is ever awoken again, and he promises. He then wipes her memory, and Sierra wakes up in her doll state.

In the final scene of the episode, Echo is seen in the middle of the pod room. In her book she finds an all-access pass given to her by Boyd with a note saying "for the storm." Sierra and Victor are sleeping in one of the pods together.

== Reception ==
=== Reviews ===
Jevon Phillips from Los Angeles Times said of Belonging that "The episode was great, to say the least...The episode also added even more to the lore of the romance between Victor and Sierra." Eric Goldman from IGN said of the episode, "In many ways, it is superior to almost every other episode of the show so far, and certainly has some of the best material."

=== Ratings ===
"Belonging" was viewed by 2.1 million viewers when first broadcast in the United States, with a 0.8/3 ratings share among adults aged 18–49.
