= Belle Chose (Dollhouse) =

- Dollhouse episode
- Episode no.: Season 2 Episode 3
- Directed by: David Solomon
- Written by: Tim Minear
- Production code: 2APK02
- Original air date: October 9, 2009

Episode chronology
← Previous "Instinct"	Next → "Belonging"
- Dollhouse (season 2)

"Belle Chose" is the third episode of the second season of the American science fiction television series Dollhouse and the show's 16th episode overall. The episode was written by Tim Minear and directed by David Solomon. It aired in the United States on Fox on October 9, 2009.

In this episode, Echo is imprinted as a college student to play out the fantasy of a rich professor. Victor is imprinted with the personality of Terry Karrens, – a kidnapper and man on the verge of becoming a serial killer. When Victor/Terry escapes from the Dollhouse to finish his "game" with his trapped and terrified victims, Topher attempts a remote wipe with disastrous results, imprinting Victor as Kiki the college girl, and Echo as Terry.

== Plot ==
A man is in a warehouse adjusting very real mannequins into a summer croquet scene, similar to those seen in store displays. He's exceedingly polite; uses exclamations no stronger than "Goodness gracious;" refers to the mannequins as Little Sister, Big Sister, Mother, and Aunt Sheila; and generally seems to be attempting a 1950s-style "homey-ness." When the Aunt Sheila "mannequin" starts to crawl away, the man injects the woman with a paralyzing drug. Before the drug takes full effect, she tries to attack the man and he kills her with a croquet mallet. He looks at the other mannequins (who are really kidnapped and paralyzed women) and tells them they must find a new Aunt Sheila. On his search for a new plaything, he is hit by a car.

Back at the Dollhouse, Paul Ballard is having issues adjusting to his new role as Echo's new handler. Boyd and Adelle have a conversation about the recent departure of Dr. Claire Saunders (Whiskey). Victor vocalizes that he too misses Dr. Saunders. Boyd and Adelle walk to her office, where Topher is caring for a now comatose Terry Karrens, the victim of the car accident and the nephew of one of the Dollhouse's rich benefactors. Ivy gives Ballard the details of Echo's next engagement: a teacher/student fantasy. Topher informs Adelle that Terry Karrens' brain resembles that of a serial killer, and it would be a bad idea to wake him up. Bradley (Terry's uncle played by guest star Michael Hogan) tells Adelle the real reason he wanted them to revive Terry: they need to find Terry's victims and pay them off.

When Topher imprints Victor with Terry's mind, Ballard interrogates him while Boyd takes Echo (now Kiki) on her engagement. As Kiki confronts her teacher (the client) about her recent F on an essay, Ballard brutally questions Terry, with Adelle watching their interaction on a monitor. Terry confesses that he killed Aunt Sheila (because she was "a whore"), and when he goes to report back to Adelle, Bradley sneaks off with Victor/Terry.

Once away from the Dollhouse, Victor/Terry knocks his uncle unconscious and leaves to continue his search for a new Aunt Sheila. Adelle thinks it will be easy to track him down, because all actives are GPS tagged. Topher informs her that Victor's tag was removed when they started his facial reconstruction/scar removal, and it has not been re-implanted because Dr. Saunders left. Back at the warehouse, Terry's victims start to wake up. Adelle asks Topher if he can remote-wipe Victor, so he will not continue on Terry's kidnapping spree.

On Echo's engagement, Kiki and the teacher discuss Geoffrey Chaucer's The Canterbury Tales, specifically The Wife of Bath's Tale and Alisoun's feminist power. The teacher tells Kiki she has a similar power. Boyd is waiting outside in the van when Topher calls, telling him the system will be down for a little while they try the remote-wipe on Victor. Victor/Terry enters a dance club when Topher tries to activate the remote-wipe. He suddenly has a searing headache, and all of the Dollhouse's systems shut down.

On engagement, Kiki is still dancing with her teacher, until he whispers in her ear "You are an incredible woman". A confused Echo then stabs the teacher in the neck with a letter opener. Then she sees herself in the mirror and says "Goodness gracious." Echo is now Terry.

In the Dollhouse, Adelle calls Boyd and tells him to bring Echo in. While walking towards the teacher's office, Boyd is almost run over by a car driven by Echo. He finds the teacher bleeding on the floor of his office and calls an ambulance. Boyd then sees "Whore" written on a mirror in the teacher's blood.

Adelle and Topher discuss how Terry's imprint could have been shifted to Echo. They realize that if Terry's imprint is in Echo, where's Kiki's imprint? A newly rejuvenated Victor dances frivolously at the club. He introduces himself to a group of men as Kiki. As Ballard shows up at the club, Adelle calls to inform him of the situation. Victor/Kiki hits on a male patron of the club, and a loud commotion is heard. The crowd falls silent and Paul rushes to Victor/Kiki who has punched the male patron in retaliation. Victor/Kiki asks why he would try to hit a girl, showing that she is not aware whose body she is in. Victor/Kiki sees Paul and grabs him, hugging him and asking him why he left.

Back at the warehouse, the kidnapped women almost escape when Echo/Terry shows up. They think she is there to help them but Echo attacks one of them women with a croquet mallet. They plead with her to let them go and she/he goes on a rampage. Before she's able to hit another captive, Echo glitches.

Paul brings Victor/Kiki back to the house, and Topher finally gets the system running again. Topher uses Echo's GPS tag to locate her. At the warehouse, Echo tells the women they have to kill Terry before he takes control of her mind again. "Big Sis" has no problem with that idea and starts brutally beating Echo/Terry with the croquet mallet. "Mother" stops Big Sis from killing Echo until Echo tells her how Terry stalked her. The woman raises the croquet mallet but is stopped by a Dollhouse employee. Ballard shows up and asks if Echo would like a treatment.

Later in Terry's room at the Dollhouse, Adelle tells Ballard that the comatose Terry is going back to a regular hospital, and she tells him that she feels it would be better if Terry were never to wake up. Adelle leaves Ballard alone with Terry; some time thereafter, a wiped Echo comes into Terry's room and finds Ballard standing over Terry's bed. As Ballard leaves, he tells Echo that Terry will no longer be dreaming. After Ballard is gone, Terry flatlines; observing this, Echo exclaims "Goodness gracious."

== Reception ==
=== Reviews ===
Eric Goldman of IGN gave the episode a 7.4. He pointed out that Echo would not be such a popular doll if all her clients knew how often she glitched. Despite this discrepancy, he enjoyed the episode, specifically the Terry/Victor storyline.
