= Stop-Loss (Dollhouse) =

- Dollhouse episode
- Episode no.: Season 2 Episode 9
- Directed by: Félix Enríquez Alcalá
- Written by: Andrew Chambliss
- Production code: 2APK09
- Original air date: December 18, 2009

Episode chronology
← Previous "A Love Supreme"	Next → "The Attic"
- Dollhouse (season 2)

"Stop-Loss" is the ninth episode of the second season of the American science fiction television series Dollhouse and the show's 22nd episode overall. The episode was written by Andrew Chambliss and directed by Félix Enríquez Alcalá. It aired in the United States on Fox on December 18, 2009.

This episode focuses on Victor, after he leaves the Dollhouse. Another part of Rossum's agenda is revealed. This episode was aired back-to-back with "The Attic".

== Plot ==
The episode begins with Adelle, a.k.a. Miss Lonely Hearts, having a night with Victor. However Victor breaks up with Adelle, citing another woman. In the Dollhouse, Topher explains to Boyd that Ballard is completely wiped. Boyd leaves to deliver the news to Echo. Adelle barges into Topher's office and asks why Victor would dump Ms. Lonely Hearts, but in process reveals she is actually Ms. Lonely Hearts. Topher says there is nothing wrong with the imprint and what ever happened it wasn't his fault. Victor's wipe is complete and upon waking up asks for Sierra.

Echo attempts to use the access pass that Boyd has given her to see Ballard. Boyd warns Echo against using it for now, to avoid drawing the wrath of Adelle. Boyd tells Echo to say goodbye to Victor and he will speak with Adelle about Ballard. Adelle denies Echo of seeing Ballard and wants Echo to suffer to see who she is now. Adelle then orders Boyd to see through Victor's release. Victor and Sierra are having breakfast together but soon Victor is told he is having a treatment. Echo tells Victor that he won't be coming back and to say goodbye to Sierra. However Victor does not understand the situation and ultimately Sierra and Victor schedule dinner together.

Topher imprints Victor with his original self, Anthony Ceccoli as his five years of service to the Dollhouse is up. Boyd briefs Anthony on his back story and his current situation. Anthony is dropped off at a suite that the Dollhouse has arranged for him. Sierra is waiting for Victor to come back so they can have dinner together but Echo tells Sierra that Victor is not coming back. Sierra believes Victor is not ready to be by himself. Anthony goes to a club by himself. He spots a woman which looks similar to Sierra and approaches her, but she does not recognise him. Anthony goes back to the suite, and subsequently sleeps in the bathtub instead of the bed. Echo sneaks out of the bed chamber to see Paul, but she cannot find him and goes to see Adelle. Echo wants to know where Ballard is, but Adelle just says that he has been moved to a more secure location. Adelle and Echo square off, and Echo says that Adelle can either join her or go against her.

Men start to invade Anthony's suite. As they are pre-occupied by the bed, Anthony sneaks out of the bathroom and is able to take out a guard, but is taken down by the other three. Topher has been monitoring Anthony's bio-link according to protocol. He informs Boyd something is wrong and Boyd asks Echo to come help investigate. Boyd believes it was an inside job as they knew to disable the bio-links and GPS. Anthony is taken to an unknown location. The people who kidnapped Anthony explain they used to be part of the Dollhouse and would like Anthony to join them as a soldier. Anthony agrees.

Boyd and Echo go back to the Dollhouse and look to see who has been into their files. They find a section of Rossum called Scytheon, which is a military wing. Scytheon is running a project called "Mind Whisper". The project uses active architecture so they can make a neural radio. Boyd informs Adelle, who tells Boyd to leave it alone. Topher believes this technology will make all the minds in "Mind Whisper" become one. If Anthony is not rescued before he becomes a part of the group, he will be lost forever.

Echo is placed into the chair and uploaded with multiple personas, all with military backgrounds. Boyd informs Echo that Adelle is out drunk. Echo summons Sierra to get her imprinted as Priya. Priya is angry at Topher for not erasing Nolan's murder from her mind as he has promised. But Topher explains the situation and she and Echo go after Anthony. Echo and Priya are able to infiltrate the base, but Anthony finds them and attempts to kill them. Priya manages to talk him down, reaching out to Victor. Adelle is awoken by Mr. Harding asking her what her actives are doing at the base. Adelle and Boyd face-off but Boyd tells her if she doesn't gain control of herself, he will come after her.

Echo knocks out Anthony after misdirecting the guards to the exit. Priya is left to defend Anthony whilst Echo looks for a way to remove Anthony from the group. Anthony soon wakes up and he and Priya are cornered by the guards. Echo plugs herself into "Mind Whisper" and is able to tell the soldiers to stand down and go home. Echo, Priya and Anthony are in the car, on the way back to the Dollhouse. However, after watching the two coo over each other, Echo tells them to get out, telling them they are free now and doesn't want to bring them back to the Dollhouse. But the disruptor is used and all three are knocked out. Adelle tells Echo that Harding was impressed with her, but she believes Echo is too dangerous and sends her to the Attic along with Priya and Anthony.

The unconscious dolls are attached to tables and covered with a clear plastic-like sheet. Echo opens her eyes and starts to push against the plastic sheet.

== Reception ==
=== Reviews ===
Rachel Reitsleff from iF Magazine said "Stop-Loss" was "good from a story standpoint, but because so much has to happen in such a short time frame, there are fewer grace notes than usual, and they are missed." Eric Goldman from IGN said the episode, "suffered from a few issues – mainly feeling very rushed – but overall was a fun, exciting and interesting installment that ranks among the best Dollhouse has offered. "
