= Meet Jane Doe =

- Dollhouse episode
- Episode no.: Season 2 Episode 7
- Directed by: Dwight Little
- Written by: Maurissa Tancharoen; Jed Whedon; Andrew Chambliss
- Production code: 2APK07
- Original air date: December 11, 2009

Guest appearances
- Ana Claudia Talancón; Glenn Morshower

Episode chronology
← Previous "The Left Hand"	Next → "A Love Supreme"
- Dollhouse (season 2)

"Meet Jane Doe" is the seventh episode of the second season of the American science fiction television series Dollhouse and the show's 20th episode overall. The episode was written by Maurissa Tancharoen, Jed Whedon and Andrew Chambliss and directed by Dwight Little. It aired in the United States on Fox on December 11, 2009.

This is the final episode of a three episodic arc where the Rossum Corporation's agenda is revealed. This episode was aired back-to-back with "A Love Supreme".

== Plot ==
The episode starts with Adelle and Topher back in the L.A. Dollhouse. Topher explains to Ivy what happened. Boyd cannot find a trace of Echo and believes she has is no longer in the D.C. area and is hitch hiking her way around. Adelle orders Boyd to find her and Ballard even if he is already dead.

Echo is now in Medina, Texas. She tries to find food in dumpsters, before she heads into a convenience store. A manager tells her to move along, but Echo notices someone taking money from an ATM. She tries to get money, but notices a woman trying to pay for groceries with food stamps. The clerk tells her they don't accept food stamps and she is forced to leave. Echo takes some food off the counter and runs out to give it to her. The woman tells Echo her name is Galena. The police arrive and Echo tells her to run. Galena is caught and Echo herself is cornered, but she is able to knock out the deputy after recalling an imprint and gets away.

Three months later, Mr. Harding is now in charge of the LA Dollhouse. Adelle has been relegated to assistant. She notes to Boyd that they no longer seem to care about an active's well-being. Echo is now working as a nurse. She goes to the county jail to cover a sick nurse and give flu shots. It is here Echo meets Galena again. Echo notices she has been abused. She talks to Galena in Spanish and tells her to stay away from the guards. Echo gives Galena pills, to which the guard thinks are pain-killers. Echo instructs her to take one tomorrow before lunch as she will return.

Back in the Dollhouse, Sierra and Victor have been imprinted with scientific backgrounds and seem to be developing something. Echo comes home and she is now living with Paul. It turns out Echo dosed one of the nurse's coffee to get into the county, so they can help Galena. This is part of a training exercise with Paul so they can bring down the Dollhouse. During dinner Echo talks about her experience in taking out the deputy three months ago. She notes that her imprint overcame her but then pulled back, but left remnants of it, allowing her to form her new persona. Ballard wonders why then and not when Alpha created Omega. Echo believes it was the memory Bennet gave her. Echo seems to have fallen in love with Ballard. Echo tries to make advances on Ballard but he says he doesn't have the right. Echo says she is real and not simply a random bunch of people put together.

Ballard calls Boyd. They are working together now and Ballard tells Echo is beginning to deteriorate under the stress of all her imprints. In county, Galena takes the pill as instructed. It causes a seizure and the guards take her to Echo. Echo then injects her with verapamil to slow her heart down, and fake her death. The guards are worried Echo may report her death as abuse, and Echo makes a deal with the guards to cover up the death so she can get the body out.

In the Dollhouse, Clive Ambrose, the vice president of Rossum Corporation, reveals that Rossum is opening a Dubai Dollhouse and needs some help; Adelle is instructed to arrange some dolls for the opening. Boyd tells Adelle she needs to regain control of the house. In county, Galena wakes up before they can get out and both are arrested. Echo tries to get them out but is suffering from severe headaches as a result of using all the imprints. She collapses trying to regain control. Back in the Dollhouse, Topher is doing a presentation of his completed project. It is a ray gun capable of wiping an active to their doll state. After completing the presentation Harding notices Sierra and Victor grouping and plans to split them up.

Echo is finally able to regain control. Under multiple imprints she is able to break herself and Galena out of county. The guards try and pursue them but Ballard arrives and threatens the guards to back off, using a recording of Echo and the guards making a deal. Galena is given a new identity as she says goodbye to Echo.

In the Dollhouse, Topher believes something is amiss. He confides in Adelle that he believes Rossum's end game is to be able to imprint anyone without the use of Active architecture. What is worse is that Topher has figured out a way to do such a thing. Adelle, however, betrays Topher and gives the technology to Rossum and regains control of the Dollhouse. Echo re-enters the Dollhouse and Ballard mentions she is suffering from headaches. Adelle decides to put Echo in isolation rather than let Topher treat Echo.

== Reception ==
=== Reviews ===
Rachel Reitsleff from iF Magazine said "Meet Jane Doe" was raising "the stakes and moves the arc forward efficiently, but sometimes it’s more expository than engrossing." Eric Goldman from IGN said that the episode "served as a reminder that Dollhouse might have been better off if it had been approached from a very different, less Echo-centric overall dynamic from the start."
