= The Left Hand (Dollhouse) =

- Dollhouse episode
- Episode no.: Season 2 Episode 6
- Directed by: Wendey Stanzler
- Written by: Tracy Bellomo
- Production code: 2APK06
- Original air date: December 4, 2009

Episode chronology
← Previous "The Public Eye"	Next → "Meet Jane Doe"
- Dollhouse (season 2)

"The Left Hand" is the sixth episode of the second season of the American science fiction television series Dollhouse and the show's 19th episode overall. The episode was written by Tracy Bellomo and directed by Wendey Stanzler. It aired in the United States on Fox on December 4, 2009.

This is the second episode of a three-episode arc where the Rossum Corporation's agenda is revealed. This episode was aired back-to-back with "The Public Eye".

== Plot ==
The episode starts with D.C. Dollhouse programmer Bennett Halverson continuing to torture Echo, noting she is just a shell as she is not cursing, praying or even passing out. Perrin pleads with his handler not to be wiped, however she tells him he was a nobody and is better off forgetting who he was. Adelle and Topher head towards the D.C. Dollhouse. Echo is given one of Bennett's memories.

Adelle meets with Stewart Lipman, head of the D.C. Dollhouse. Adelle demands that Lipman give Echo back. Lipman deflects, saying he needs authorisation to release Echo, after they messed with their affairs, and it is protocol. Adelle then makes Lipman agree that Topher must inspect Echo, also as a part of protocol. Back in the L.A. Dollhouse, Victor has been imprinted with Topher's personality and is nervous about his current situation. Boyd reassures him and make sure he stays on task in getting Perrin's brain map.

Topher meets Bennett and they immediately hit it off. They seem to have feelings for one another and exchange awkward pleasantries.

Adelle continues to push Lipman to release Echo, but Lipman refuses her requests. Eventually Adelle, under the pretense of a sexual advance, threatens to send an active to castrate and kill Lipman unless he releases Echo. He finally agrees to do so.

Topher and Bennet talk about the "disruptor" used to disable Echo and Perrin. Lipman calls down, telling Bennett to release Echo and Topher uses this chance to establish a connection from the D.C. Dollhouse to L.A. Dollhouse where Victor/Topher is there to attempt getting into her files.

Perrin wakes up and finds Echo dreaming. Echo is in fact living one of Bennett's memories. In the memory Caroline leaves Bennet for dead in a wrecked lab. Bennett's arm is crushed under a concrete column and she is unable to move. Bennett pleads with Caroline not to leave her. Perrin is able to wake up Echo and they leave. As a result of the memory, Echo's left arm is unable to move. Bennett watches from the security monitors and purposely injures herself. Bennett stumbles back to find Topher and tells him Echo injured her and took Perrin. Echo and Perrin, now in the real world, are trying to get away and remove their tracking devices in a restaurant bathroom.

Topher and Bennett come up with a way to stop Echo and Perrin. By tapping the disruptor into the bio-link they should be able to put both actives to sleep. The go-ahead is given. Topher and Bennett share their active's respective brain maps and Topher is able to send Perrin's brain map to Victor/Topher. Bennett, however is preparing an assassin trigger to be uploaded along with the disruptor.

Perrin takes Echo back to his own house. There he relives the moment he met Cindy, his future wife and handler and wonders if it really happened or it was a false memory. Perrin plans to finish his mission and take down the Dollhouse. Bennett starts the disruptor but only activates it for Perrin. Echo is pinned by Perrin but overcomes Bennett's memory and is able to move her arm and free herself from Perrin's grip. Topher calls Victor/Topher and asks what is happening. Victor/Topher says he is looking at an activated sleeper and Echo's readings are spiking all over. Topher tells Bennett to undo what she did. Bennett explains that Caroline was her friend and she ended up getting a dead arm for it. Topher implores Bennett to stop Perrin but she refuses. Topher knocks her out and is now working with Victor/Topher to isolate the pathway so they can stop Perrin.

Cindy and other agents arrives at the house and begin to look for the actives. Cindy knocks out Echo and stops Perrin from hunting Echo. She tries to talk Perrin down, but he chokes her to death. Echo wakes up and tries to stop Perrin but is too late. Topher has been locked out of Bennett's system, but Victor/Topher finds the pathway and deactivates it. Echo implores Perrin to finish his job and bring down the Dollhouse.

Perrin arrives at the Senate Inquiry to reveal the truth, but his imprinting kicks in and he tells the Rossum cover story instead. He states that the Rossum Corporation has been set up by competing companies, who have killed his wife with a car bomb. He also presents forged documents showing that Madeline (once known in the Dollhouse as "November") was in a mental institution for the past three years.

Back in the L.A. Dollhouse, Boyd reports that Echo is simply gone while Ballard is still missing without trace. Victor/Topher is reluctant to have himself wiped, but eventually is. Adelle and Boyd discuss the situation with Topher; not only has Perrin managed to protect Rossum from any further bad publicity but is also now in a position to pass new laws as Rossum pleases. Worse still, Topher has discovered that Perrin has been programmed so that he'll eventually run for president, thereby allowing Rossum to place someone at the very top of Government. Meanwhile, Madeline is brought to the D.C. Dollhouse and put back into service permanently as Bennett speaks of her understanding the betrayal she's suffered. Echo walks the streets of D.C. alone.

== Reception ==
=== Reviews ===
Jevon Phillips from Los Angeles Times said of "The Left Hand" that it was "SO GOOD that it creates a kind of melancholy knowing that this too will end." Eric Goldman from IGN said of the episode, "was quite a bit more disjointed than the one that proceeded it – though it at least still possessed an energy and momentum that other Dollhouse episodes have lacked."
