= The Public Eye (Dollhouse) =

- Dollhouse episode
- Episode no.: Season 2 Episode 5
- Directed by: David Solomon
- Written by: Andrew Chambliss
- Production code: 2APK05
- Original air date: December 4, 2009

Episode chronology
← Previous "Belonging"	Next → "The Left Hand"
- Dollhouse (season 2)

"The Public Eye" is the fifth episode of the second season of the American science fiction television series Dollhouse and the show's 18th episode overall. The episode was written by Andrew Chambliss and directed by David Solomon. It aired in the United States on Fox on December 4, 2009.

This is the first episode of a three-episode arc where the Rossum Corporation's agenda is revealed. This episode was aired back-to-back with "The Left Hand".

== Plot ==
Senator Daniel Perrin holds a press conference and reveals the existence of the Dollhouse. He also introduces Madeline (formerly November) to the media as a former Dollhouse resident and his star witness for the Senate inquiry.

Mr. Harding questions Adelle DeWitt about her decision to release Madeline from her contract two years early. Adelle asks Mr. Harding how they should proceed with the Perrin situation, and he responds by saying to do nothing, as they have a plan in place. Adelle merely takes this as a suggestion, and instructs Ballard to prevent Madeline from testifying.

Ballard's investigation leads him to believe that Perrin's wife Cynthia is a doll. The staff believes that she may be a sleeper doll (like November) and may eliminate Madeline. Madeline herself has been convinced to testify against the Dollhouse after being shown photos of herself killing Hearn (which occurred in the episode "Man on the Street"). Topher reveals a way to disable Perrin's wife with a pulse weapon. However, because this pulse works on anyone with doll "architecture," it will affect Madeline as well.

Echo has been sent to Perrin's hotel room as a hooker. She videotapes her activities with Perrin. Perrin believes Rossum would never hire a real hooker to do such a job, and realizes Echo is actually a doll. Perrin takes Echo home so he can use her as further proof of the Dollhouse's existence; however, Ballard is also on the premises at the time, and attempts to use the pulse weapon to disable Cynthia, but it has no effect on her, as it is Senator Perrin, and not his wife, who is the doll. Cynthia is actually Perrin's handler. Ballard is quickly subdued by security.

Echo takes Perrin away with her. The pulse has unlocked the composite that Alpha created in "Omega." Ballard is being interrogated by Cynthia, but gives up nothing. She orders him killed, but Ballard is able to escape. The pulse has also made Perrin confused and disoriented; he starts to remember that he is a doll. Topher manages to figure out who Perrin's original personality was: Daniel Perrin. Perrin really does come from a political family, but was an aimless ne'er-do-well until the Dollhouse stepped in and gave him ambition.

Echo calls the Dollhouse, and Adelle encourages her to come in with Perrin. However, Cynthia arrives. She uses a "neural lock and key" (her version of the L.A. Dollhouse's "Everything's going to be alright. Do you trust me?"). Perrin responds correctly, but remembers the handler imprint process and pulls away. Cynthia pulls a gun and knocks Echo out. She attempts to talk Perrin down again with the neural lock and key. Echo wakes up with all her imprints alive, and is able to knock out Cynthia, using the memories and experiences of her imprints. Echo convinces Perrin to come back to the L.A. Dollhouse.

Ballard arrives at the airport to bring Madeline in. However, Madeline talks Ballard down and he allows her to leave. Echo and Perrin are caught, and are brought to the D.C. Dollhouse. Adelle believes that Perrin is a pawn. He will be used to bring the L.A. Dollhouse down and then disassociate it from Rossum. Perrin will then be able to pass any laws that Rossum sees fit.

The D.C. programmer, Bennett Halverson, recognizes Echo as Caroline, and begins to torture her.

== Reception ==
=== Reviews ===
Jevon Phillips from Los Angeles Times said of "The Public Eye" that it was "So good that it creates a kind of melancholy knowing that this too will end." Eric Goldman from IGN said of the episode, "one of its strongest installments yet – a cool and exciting hour of TV with a very fun twist. "
