= A Love Supreme (Dollhouse) =

- Dollhouse episode
- Episode no.: Season 2 Episode 8
- Directed by: David Straiton
- Written by: Jenny DeArmitt
- Production code: 2APK08
- Original air date: December 11, 2009

Guest appearances
- Alan Tudyk as Alpha; Patton Oswalt as Joel Mynor; Brett Claywell as Matt Cargill; David Lee Smith as Clay Corman

Episode chronology
← Previous "Meet Jane Doe"	Next → "Stop-Loss"
- Dollhouse (season 2)

"A Love Supreme" is the eighth episode of the second season of the American science fiction television series Dollhouse and the show's 21st episode overall. The episode was written by Jenny DeArmitt and directed by David Straiton. It aired in the United States on Fox on December 11, 2009.

In this episode Alpha returns following his surveillance of Echo during her months away from the Dollhouse. This episode was aired back-to-back with "Meet Jane Doe."

== Plot ==
The episode starts with a man confessing to Alpha that he spent his entire fortune on engagements and ended up falling in love with a woman who did not exist (Echo). Alpha quickly kills him, saying "Seems love wasn't enough."

In the Dollhouse, Echo has been placed in isolation. She is suffering from headaches as a result of all her imprints. Victor has been imprinted as a psychologist and questions her on what she did during her time away. Adelle seems to be trying to goad Ballard into saying what he and Echo got up to during their three-month absence. Ballard stonewalls, despite being clearly frustrated. Boyd tells Ballard that Adelle is trying to make him squirm—and it's working. Boyd goes on to tell Ballard that he swore to protect Echo, and the only way to protect her is to stop reacting to Adelle's actions. Victor tells Adelle he finds Echo in a completely childlike state, and ends up insulting Adelle. Topher agrees with what Victor had said, and adds that physically, Echo is fine.

Topher then approaches Boyd and Ballard. He tells them Echo's brain scans are the craziest he has ever seen and demands to know what is going on. Boyd and Ballard tell Topher that Echo is not a blank slate—that she still has every imprint she has ever had, and she can control what she recalls and when. Adelle informs Ballard that Echo is going to be placed back into the field. Topher tells Echo about the engagement and asks her to sit in the chair, but Echo recalls the imprint by herself. Topher notes that he is now obsolete.

Echo arrives at the engagement but finds the client is dead. Ballard calls Boyd to investigate as Echo has not been able to regain control of her own body as the imprint seems overwhelmed. As Ballard and Boyd discuss the crime scene, Echo comes to and finds a note implying Alpha killed the client. Adelle orders Echo back into isolation and Boyd informs Ballard of all the clients that have been killed, all of which were romantic engagements with Echo.

Sierra arrives back in the Dollhouse to be wiped after a romantic engagement. Sierra mentions Alpha's name and a background search on the client reveals it was Alpha who arranged for Sierra. Alpha also leaves a message telling the Dollhouse of his next victim. Adelle orders all the dolls to be wiped again. Ballard and Boyd track down Alpha, who has a client strapped to a bomb. Boyd tries to talk Alpha down, but Alpha reveals he is jealous of the love Echo has for her clients. Alpha then blows up the client and disappears.

Boyd and Ballard try and track down Joel Mynor ("Man on the Street") who is the last client alive. Joel is reluctant to go with Ballard but eventually does so after Echo/Rebecca appears and they bring Joel to the Dollhouse. Adelle is angry with Boyd and Ballard for taking Echo out of isolation and subsequently places Echo back into isolation. Alpha appears in Adelle's office. Adelle tries to bargain with Alpha but Alpha wants nothing Adelle can give. However, Alpha shows Adelle photos of Ballard and Echo together during their 3-month absence from the house. Boyd and Ballard then see Alpha on their surveillance cameras. Alpha activates a remote imprinting, making all the actives fight the Dollhouse staff. Echo is unaffected and breaks out of isolation. Adelle locks herself in Dr. Saunder's office. Ballard arrives in Topher's office but is knocked out by Victor.

Alpha straps Ballard in the chair and interrogates Ballard on the love they share. Ballard denies the feelings between himself and Echo, but Alpha does not believe him. Echo arrives to save Adelle and takes her, Topher, Boyd and Joel to the bed chambers. Echo leaves to find Paul, but it is too late. Alpha's brain scan of Ballard has left him brain dead. Topher and Boyd go to the manufacturing room to get the remote wipe device. Echo and Alpha engage in a fist fight, which Echo is winning, when Alpha's Ballard imprint gains control of Alpha's body. He uses the neural lock and key to get Echo to try to kill Alpha, but Echo cannot follow through, allowing Alpha to escape.

Topher and Boyd are successful in wiping all the dolls. In the final scenes, Echo watches over Ballard who is on life support. Joel says goodbye to Echo/Rebecca for the last time. Adelle watches Echo's behavior.

== Reception ==
=== Reviews ===
Rachel Reitsleff from iF Magazine said "A Love Supreme" was moving "forward at speed, keeping us highly engaged as the story flows." Eric Goldman from IGN said the episode "lacked a lot of the impact it felt the writers were going for."
