= Soul Purpose =

- Angel episode
- Episode no.: Season 5 Episode 10
- Directed by: David Boreanaz
- Written by: Brent Fletcher
- Production code: 5ADH10
- Original air date: January 21, 2004

Guest appearances
- Sarah Thompson as Eve; Mercedes McNab as Harmony Kendall; Christian Kane as Lindsey McDonald; Ciara Hughes as Blue Fairy; Rob Evors as Man; Jodi Harris as Woman; Carmen Nicole as Lana; Sarah Michelle Gellar as Buffy Summers (voice only)

Episode chronology
← Previous "Harm's Way"	Next → "Damage"
- Angel season 5

"Soul Purpose" is the 10th episode of the fifth season of the American television series Angel. Written by Brent Fletcher and it was the directorial debut of David Boreanaz, who plays Angel, and was originally broadcast on January 21, 2004, on the WB network. In "Soul Purpose", guest star Christian Kane returns as Lindsey McDonald, taking on the deceased Doyle's name in an attempt to convince Spike that he is the vampire champion mentioned in the Shanshu Prophecy. Meanwhile, Angel slips into a feverish hallucinative state in which he dreams that his destiny of redemption is claimed by Spike.

== Plot ==
In Angel's dream, he relives the moment in which Spike drinks from the cup that signifies he is the champion referred to by the Shanshu Prophecy. In his dream, the cup is not a fake, and radiance shines down on Spike, then incinerates Angel in the same way the amulet incinerated Spike when he sacrificed himself in Sunnydale. Meanwhile, Lindsey approaches Spike at a strip club, implying he was responsible for Spike's return from the dead and his subsequent return to corporeality. Introducing himself as Doyle, Lindsey claims he has visions of people in trouble and that he had a vision of a girl who is about to get attacked in an alley. Spike tells him to go to Angel instead, but "Doyle" says that Angel is "working the other side of the tracks" now. Spike saves the girl, after which Lindsey suggests that Spike may be the new champion of The Powers That Be. The next night, Spike saves a couple from vampires. Meanwhile, at Wolfram & Hart, Wesley and Gunn present Angel with possible solutions to deal with an evil warlock, but Angel - weary of the "gray area" of morality in which he constantly finds himself, suggests killing everyone. He then says that he is just tired, and the others tell him to go get some sleep.

In Angel's dream, Fred cuts open Angel's chest and starts pulling out his internal organs, including his "dried-up little walnut" of a heart. Fred also pulls out a strand of beads (which she puts on), some raisins (which she eats), and a license plate. She pulls out a fishbowl, calling the dead goldfish inside it Angel's soul, and says that they will have to flush it and hands it to the bear standing next to her. Fred turns back to Angel and tells him that she cannot find anything wrong with him but thinks he is empty inside.

The next morning, Eve gives Wesley a fragment of a relic, saying the Senior Partners want to know what it is. Gunn arrives and announces that a vampire matching Spike's description has been out on the streets, saving people. Meanwhile, Angel is dreaming that Spike and Buffy are having sex in his bed. He wakes up and goes downstairs, where Gunn warns him to look out the windows. Angel joins the group of people in his office, staring out the windows at L.A. as it burns. Lorne suggests that Angel change his clothes, since there is something on his shirt. Angel looks down to see a bloody stake sticking out of his heart. As Angel dreams in his room, a blue creature feeds off of his chest in the same spot as the stake in his dream. He then dreams about the team and the firm celebrating Spike fulfilling his destiny to turn L.A. into utopia. A blue fairy floats in and sprinkles gold dust on Spike, making his heart beat again. As everyone cheers for Spike, Angel is suddenly a man staffing the mail cart.

In reality, Spike is at the spartan basement apartment that Lindsey provided for him, when Gunn and Wesley stop by. They tell him that if he wants to rescue people, Wolfram & Hart has resources that can help him. Spike declines the offer, saying Wolfram & Hart is the same evil law firm it has always been. At Eve's apartment, Lindsey reminds Eve that the Senior Partners will kill him if find out what they are up to. Eve assures him that they will not find him thanks to his tattoos. Wesley and Gunn head back to Wolfram & Hart and tell Fred that Spike thinks they have sold out. Fred starts to go up to check on Angel, until Eve arrives, reminding her to test the relic.

Angel is dreaming of Lorne dressed Old West-style, playing "My Darling Clementine" on a piano in Angel's room. As Harmony (dressed like a Copacabana waitress) serves him a drink, Angel tells Lorne that everything hurts, which Lorne remarks is a part of life, especially as Angel lives to see it forever. Lorne tells Angel that the crowd is turning on him as Gunn snarls and hisses at Angel. Eve appears, noting that Angel is suffering. Lorne says that Angel still has something on his shirt, and Angel looks down to see the blue creature on his chest. He pulls it off, wakes up, and kills it. Eve tells him that he is still dreaming but it is almost over. She pulls a bigger blue creature out of the box she is holding and puts it on him. She watches while he struggles against it, then leaves. At Spike's apartment, Lindsey pretends to have a vision and tells Spike that he should take care of it.

Angel sits in a chair in the middle of a sunny field as the gang approach him and assure him he can stay there as long as he likes. Angel says he is not done with his job, but Wesley says that he can be if he wants to. Fred says that he will be fine - he just has to stop caring. Suddenly, the four of them throw their heads back and scream.

In Angel's room, Spike grabs the blue creature and kills it. Later, the gang and Eve gather in Angel's room and Wesley explains that the creature was a parasite which makes the host oblivious to its presence and causes hallucinations. If Spike had not killed it, Angel might have been trapped in a vegetative state. Angel says Eve put the parasite on him - after Eve put the second parasite on him, she changed her clothes so that Angel would not remember her being there for real, but she did not change her earrings. He notes that Eve is playing her own game and wonders what the Senior Partners would say if they knew. Eve tells them to stop blaming her for their problems when they should really be looking within the group.

== Production ==
This episode was directed by actor David Boreanaz, who plays Angel. Adam Ward, the first assistant/focus puller, says although Boreanaz "didn't have the cinematographer's vernacular", he was able to accurately describe how he wanted the scenes to look to director of photography Ross Berryman, doing a "phenomenal job" for his directorial debut. In an interview with Sci Fi Weekly, Boreanaz says some of his original ideas for this episode needed to be "toned down" by executive producer Jeffrey Bell: "I had to remind myself that I am shooting an Angel show and not this crazy, cinematic, swooping thing" although producer Kelly Manners "really allowed me the opportunity to do some things a first time director wouldn't normally be allowed to do." Of the experience, Boreanaz says, "I've always been fascinated with the camera and the movement and communicating with other actors. Directing is really about telling someone to put applesauce on the table...And some people know how to do it, and some people don't."

The dream scenes in this episode were filmed at high speed and then slowed down in post-production. Boreanaz says, "It's pretty introspective of what's going on in Angel's mind...It's more of his perspective of what's going on, we don't know what's real and what's not real." The scene in which Fred performs surgery on Angel is done with a prosthetic torso; Amy Acker says that scene was her personal "highlight of the season."

Boreanaz had just had reconstructive surgery on the ACL of his left knee, which is why he spends most of this episode immobilized in bed.

According to the DVD commentary, the production of the "big parasite" cost $80,000.

=== Writing ===
News of Christian Kane's return was leaked over the internet before this episode aired, but writer Brent Fletcher explains that they had anticipated this. While they were filming, Lindsey refers to himself as Shawn instead of Doyle; Kane re-dubbed his lines during ADR. "If you watch my lips I’m not saying ’Doyle’", Kane says, "I’m saying Joey or whatever it was."

== Reception ==
Angel's dream in which he sees Spike having sex with Buffy was "so fake it's embarrassing they even tried it," an Angel guidebook complains; the obvious stunt double and use of overdubbing emphasizes rather than masks Sarah Michelle Gellar's absence from the show.
