= Spike (Buffy the Vampire Slayer) =

Character in Buffy the Vampire Slayer and Angel

- Buffy the Vampire Slayer / Angel character
- First appearance: "School Hard" (1997)
- Last appearance: Finale (2018)
- Created by: Joss Whedon; David Greenwalt
- Portrayed by: James Marsters
- Voiced by: James Marsters

In-universe information
- Affiliation: The Whirlwind; Scooby Gang; Wolfram & Hart
- Classification: Vampire
- Notable powers: Common powers of vampires, enhanced

William "Spike" Pratt, played by James Marsters, is a fictional character created by Joss Whedon and David Greenwalt for the television series Buffy the Vampire Slayer and Angel. Spike is a vampire and played various roles on the shows, including villain, anti-hero, trickster and romantic interest. For Marsters, the role as Spike began a career in science fiction television, becoming "the obvious go-to guy for US cult [television]." For creator Whedon, Spike is the "most fully developed" of his characters. The character was intended to be a brief villain, with Whedon originally adamant to not have another major "romantic vampire" character like Angel. Marsters says "Spike was supposed to be dirty and evil, punk rock, and then dead." However, the character ended up staying through the second season, and then returning in the fourth to replace Cordelia as "the character who told Buffy she was stupid and about to die."

Within the series' narrative, William was an unsuccessful aspiring poet in the Victorian era who was mocked and called "William the Bloody" because of his "bloody awful" poetry. Sired by the vampire Drusilla (Juliet Landau), William became an unusually passionate and romantic vampire, being very violent and ready to battle, but not as cruel as his companions. Alongside Drusilla, Darla (Julie Benz) and Angelus (David Boreanaz), Giles thinks William acquired the nickname Spike for his preferred method of torturing people with railroad spikes, but it is revealed it is because his poetry was "so bad you could stick a railroad spike through your head." He was noted for killing two vampire Slayers; Xin Rong in China in 1900 during the Boxer Rebellion, the other was Nikki Wood in 1977 New York, where Spike acquired his trademark leather duster. During the second season of the series, Spike comes to Sunnydale hoping to kill a third Slayer, Buffy Summers (Sarah Michelle Gellar), with whom he later forges an uneasy alliance. Over the course of Buffy, Spike falls in love with the Slayer, reacquires his soul to prove himself to Buffy and dies a hero in the show's series finale. He is subsequently resurrected in the first episode of the fifth season of the spin-off series Angel.

Considered a "breakout character", Spike proved immensely popular with fans of Buffy. The character appears substantially in Expanded Universe materials such as comic books and tie-in novels. Following the cancellation of Angel in 2004, Whedon considered creating a Spike film spin-off. Canonically, the character appears in issues of the comic books Buffy the Vampire Slayer Season Eight (2007–11), Angel: After the Fall (2007–09), Buffy the Vampire Slayer Season Nine, Angel & Faith (both 2011–2013) and several Spike limited series, spinning off from both Buffy and Angel. The character also appears in the comic series Buffy the Vampire Slayer Season Eleven (2016–2017) and Buffy the Vampire Slayer Season Twelve (2018).

== Appearances ==
=== Television ===
==== Early history ====
Spike's story before he appears in Sunnydale unfolds in flashbacks scattered, out of sequence, among numerous episodes of both Buffy the Vampire Slayer and Angel. The first flashback occurs in Buffy season 5's "Fool for Love", and reveals William as in fact a meek, effete young man of aristocratic background (and an aspiring poet) who lived in London with his mother, Anne. Anne would often sing the folksong "Early One Morning" to her son, right up until the time he was turned into a vampire. William's surname is given as "Pratt" in the non-canon comic Old Times and is written on the label of his jar of blood in the comic Spike: Asylum #002. This surname became official with the publication of the canon comic Buffy the Vampire Slayer Season 11 #7, in which Buffy calls him by it. The name William Pratt may allude to horror actor Boris Karloff, whose birth name was William Henry Pratt, and can also be understood as the British slang term "prat", describing a person of arrogant stupidity.

Spike is one of the youngest recurring vampires on the show, though the evidence of his age is contradictory, as the concept of the character evolved over time. When he was introduced in "School Hard" (season 2), Giles read that he was "barely 200," implying that he was either born or sired in 1797 or slightly earlier. In "The Initiative" (season 4) he said he was 126, thus born or sired in 1874. Flashbacks in "Fool for Love" (season 5) show that Spike was sired as an adult in 1880. Assuming he was in his early to mid-20s when he was sired, Spike would be in his 140s during the series. In the comic Spike: Asylum #002, Spike's jar of blood has a label giving his assumed human birth date in 1853, about 27 years before he was sired.

William, before becoming a vampire

In 1880, William was a struggling poet, often mocked by his peers who called him "William the Bloody" behind his back because his poetry was so "bloody awful." The true origins of this nickname were not revealed until three years after it was first mentioned in season 2, when it was believed to have purely violent connotations. William showed a strong capacity for loyalty and devoted love, which remained after his siring. After his romantic overtures were rejected by the aristocratic Cecily, William wandered the streets despondently and bumped into Drusilla. She consoled him, drained him of blood and made him drink of her blood, thus transforming him into a vampire – "siring" him, in the jargon of the series. Spike's grand-sire, Angelus, became his mentor (leading Spike occasionally to describe him loosely as his sire): "Drusilla sired me, but you, you made me a monster." Whereas new vampires in the Buffyverse often delight in killing their families once they become evil, William was a notable exception. Having always been very close to his mother, he turned her into a vampire to save her from tuberculosis. But his mother, as a vampire, taunted William and insinuated he had always had a sexual fascination with her. William chose to stake her because he found he could not bear to see his mother behaving like the soulless vampire he had made of her. She, like most vampires, lacked his unusual capacity for some of the softer human emotions, like love and compassion.

After staking his mother, William began a new life with Drusilla, to whom he was utterly devoted. Euphoric with his newfound vampiric abilities, he adopted the poses and trappings of a cultural rebel, affecting a working class East London accent and embracing impulsiveness and extreme violence. He adopted the nom de guerre "Spike" based on his habit of torturing people with railroad spikes – possibly prompted by criticism of his poetry: "I'd rather have a railroad spike through my head than listen to that awful stuff." In "The Weight of the World", Spike mentions having spent "the better part of a century" in delinquency, suggesting criminal activities other than killing for blood. In the company of Drusilla, Angelus, and Darla, Spike terrorized Europe and Asia for almost two decades. He had a strained relationship with Drusilla's sire Angelus, who continued a sexual relationship with her despite Spike's strong disapproval. Although Angelus did enjoy the company of another male vampire in their travels, he found Spike's recklessness and lust for battle to be unnecessary risks. Angelus regarded killing as an art, not a sport, and killed for the sheer act of evil; Spike did it for amusement and the rush.

In 1894, Spike and Angelus developed a rivalry with the enigmatic Immortal, who later had Spike sent to prison for tax evasion. In 1900, Spike killed Xin Rong, a Chinese Slayer while in China during the Boxer Rebellion. In 1943, he was captured by Nazis for experimentation and taken aboard a submarine, where he was briefly reunited with Angel. By the 1950s, Spike had reunited with Drusilla, and they traveled to Italy. At some point, Spike also became a rival of the famous vampire Dracula. The enmity between Spike and Dracula was explored in the comic series Spike vs. Dracula, in which their mutual hatred is caused when Spike, along with Darla and Drusilla, slaughtered the Romani (gypsy) tribe who had cursed their patriarch Angelus with a soul, although it is unclear if either Spike or Drusilla knew precisely why Darla was so angry with the tribe. That clan (unknown to Spike) was favored by Dracula, and he sought revenge for their deaths. Spike later mentions in a conversation with Riley Finn, "Dracula? Poncy bugger owes me £11, for one thing," because Dracula tossed Spike's signed copy of Bram Stoker's Dracula in a fire in 1898. Spike also notes that Dracula's fame has done more damage to vampires than any Slayer, since it made their weaknesses more widely known. Spike attended Woodstock in 1969, whereupon he accidentally became high after ingesting the blood of a hippie. He claims to have spent the six hours following the incident "watching my hand move". In 1977, he fought and killed a second Slayer, Nikki Wood, aboard a subway train in New York City, taking from her a black leather duster which he wears throughout his appearances on Buffy and Angel until it is destroyed in an explosion in season 5 of Angel, whereupon he gets a new one that looks exactly like the old one ("The Girl in Question"). At some point post-1977, Billy Idol allegedly "stole" Spike's look and made it famous as his own (as revealed in season 7’s "Sleeper"; see "Appearance" below); Spike's thoughts on this are unrecorded. Inasmuch as Buffy knew of the "theft" as of "Sleeper," Spike presumably shared the detail with her in an undepicted moment.

Spike's flashback appearances, in chronological order, include:

- Lies My Parents Told Me 2nd flashback: In 1880 England, William, pre-Spike, tends to his ailing mother Anne.
- Fool for Love 1st flashback / Darla 3rd flashback: In 1880, William is rejected by Cecily and sired by Drusilla, with whom he immediately falls in love.
- Lies My Parents Told Me 3rd and 4th flashbacks: In 1880, William sires his mother Anne who, as a vampire, turns against him, forcing him to destroy her.
- Destiny series of flashbacks: In 1880, Drusilla introduces William to her sire Angelus. Although the two become fast friends, they later clash when William discovers Angelus having sex with Drusilla. Angelus, informing William that when one is a vampire "you can take what you want, have what you want, but nothing is yours," fights William for the first time.
- "Fool for Love" 2nd flashback: Months after being sired, William, now called Spike, has through acts of public mayhem forced Angelus' vampire group (himself, Spike, Drusilla, and Angelus' sire/paramour Darla) to flee London. Spike first learns of the existence of the Vampire Slayer.
- The Girl in Question 1st flashback: In 1894, Spike and Angelus are imprisoned by the mysterious Immortal, who seduces Drusilla and Darla in their absence.
- Darla 4th flashback: In 1898 Romania Spike and Drusilla, on Darla's orders, attack the Kalderash tribe who ensouled Angelus, later called Angel. Following this incident, Angel parts company with the group and the other three vampires resume their travels without him.
- "Fool for Love" 3rd flashback / Darla 5th flashback: In 1900 China, Spike kills the Chinese Vampire Slayer. Angel, still ensouled, briefly reunites with the group; when Spike and Drusilla, neither of whom seem aware that Angel is ensouled, boast of Spike's deed, Angel pretends to be impressed but is actually disgusted. Darla ultimately rejects Angel because he can no longer bring himself to kill innocents, and Angel again leaves the group. Precisely what Spike and Drusilla make of these developments between their "elders" is unrevealed. At some point over the next few decades, Spike and Drusilla part company with Darla, and Spike's reputation for bloodshed and chaos eventually rivals even that of Angelus.
- Why We Fight series of flashbacks: In 1943, Spike, temporarily adventuring without Drusilla, and two other vampires are abducted by Nazi agents onto a Nazi U-Boat. Angel, working for the US government, helps Spike seize control of the sub. The two escape and then part ways. As far as is known, this is Spike and Angel's last meeting prior to the events of School Hard in 1998. Even a century after the fact, Spike, genuinely pleased to be reunited with Angel, is initially unaware of Angel's re-ensouled status, as he clearly invited Angel to join him in his mayhem.
- The Girl in Question 2nd flashback: Spike and Drusilla visit Italy.
- Lies My Parents Told Me 1st flashback: In 1977 New York, Spike fights Vampire Slayer Nikki Wood while her young son Robin watches from a hiding place.
- "Fool for Love" 4th flashback: In 1977 New York, Spike again fights Nikki Wood, killing her. These are Spike's last depicted activities preceding his arrival in Sunnydale, California.

==== Sunnydale ====
Spike's first appearance in the episode "School Hard" (1997).

Spike first arrives in Sunnydale in season 2 of Buffy the Vampire Slayer, in the episode "School Hard", accompanied by Drusilla. Spike and Dru were modeled on Sid Vicious and Nancy Spungen; punk, "badass" vampires to contrast sharply with the more ceremonial tradition of the Master and the Order of Aurelius from season 1. Spike is in fact a fan of Sid Vicious' band The Sex Pistols and punk band The Ramones. In the final scene of the episode "Lovers Walk", he can be seen singing to a cover of "My Way" by Gary Oldman, who portrayed Vicious in the film Sid and Nancy. Spike's first act in Sunnydale is to attack Buffy and a large group of people at her school, making his first appearance the deadliest of any of Buffy's "Big Bads".He very nearly kills Buffy, but Buffy's mother distracts Spike long enough for Buffy to recover by hitting him in the head with a fire axe. Throughout season 2, Spike and Dru are the canon's most prominent example of affection between vampires, displaying the humanity and intricacies of vampire relationships. Spike was initially conceived as a disposable villain to be killed off, but proved so popular with fans that Joss Whedon decided to merely injure him instead, in the episode "What's My Line, Part Two". Spike is crushed by a collapsing pipe organ and left paralyzed. (Later, it is revealed that Spike's injuries have healed and that he has been deceiving everyone by remaining in his wheelchair, feigning injury.)

Spike and Drusilla are major enemies of Buffy for much of the second season. They arrive shortly after Drusilla is seriously weakened by an angry mob in Prague, as recounted in the canon comic book The Problem with Vampires. Spike is a devoted caretaker to Drusilla in her weakened condition and initially hopes the Hellmouth's energy can help restore her strength. He reunites with Angel and seems genuinely pleased to see him, but is disgusted to find that Angel has a soul (whether or not Spike in fact knew that Angel's acquisition of a soul is why he left the group nearly a century before has never been made clear) and is in love with the current Slayer, Buffy Summers. When Angel loses his soul and rejoins Spike and Dru, Spike's initial celebration soon turns to resentment when Angelus pursues Drusilla as a lover and taunts him. Spike decides to ally himself with Buffy against Angelus; as he explains to Buffy, in addition to wanting Drusilla back, he also wants to "save the world":

"We like to talk big, vampires do. I'm going to destroy the world. That's just tough guy talk. Strutting around with your friends over a pint of blood. The truth is, I like this world. You've got – dog racing, Manchester United, and you've got people. Billions of people walking around like Happy Meals with legs. It's all right here. But then someone comes along with a vision, with a real passion for destruction. Angel could pull it off. Goodbye Piccadilly, farewell Leicester bloody Square."

— Spike to Buffy, "Becoming, Part Two"

Spike reappears in the season 3 episode "Lovers Walk", in a drunken depression after Drusilla, offended by his alliance with Buffy, dumps him for a Chaos Demon. He kidnaps Willow and Xander, and forces Willow to conduct a love spell for him to make Drusilla love him again, even coercing Buffy and Angel to help him in exchange for the safe return of their friends. The excitement of a brawl with the Mayor's vampires helps him see that Drusilla left him because he had begun to go soft; he resolves to win her back by torturing her until she likes him again, and tells Buffy where to find Willow and Xander. He also tells Buffy and Angel that they can never be 'just friends' because of their love for one another. This insight foreshadows Spike's later role as the "truth-seer" of the group.

Spike returns to Sunnydale alone in season 4, in the episode "The Harsh Light of Day", briefly living with Harmony Kendall, a shallow former classmate of Buffy, now a vampire. He is in Sunnydale to look for the Gem of Amarra, a ring which makes a vampire effectively invulnerable. He finds it and attacks Buffy in daylight, but she wrests the ring from his finger and sends it to Angel. Spike goes to Los Angeles, and hires a vampire named Marcus to torture Angel in order to get the ring, but Marcus takes the ring himself and Angel finally destroys it.

After being captured by the Initiative and implanted with a cerebral microchip which punishes him with debilitating pain whenever he harms or attempts to harm any non-demon life forms (he initially assumes it works the same with anything living), Spike turns to the Scooby Gang for protection, bartering his knowledge of the Initiative. (Though he still spars with Buffy, provided he has no real intent on harming her) His inability to bite is comically compared to impotence, much to Spike's constant humiliation; in "Doomed", he attempts to commit suicide by staking himself at Xander's house, but is stopped by Willow and Xander. Eventually, he inadvertently discovers that he can harm demons and enthusiastically joins a fight with this knowledge, showing that he's less concerned about what side he's fighting on than fighting for the thrill of it. Occasionally helping the Scooby Gang by providing them with information and/or combat assistance in exchange for cash or for the joy of fighting, but having no qualms about betraying them to such enemies as Faith and Adam. In season 4, Spike was introduced to fill the antagonistic role that Cordelia had in seasons 1 to 3; as Joss Whedon explains on the DVD featurette, "All of our characters got to the point where they were loving and hugging, and it was sort of like, where's Cordelia?" Spike appeared in every episode thereafter with the exception of "The Body".

In season 5, after some erotic dreams, Spike becomes aware to his horror that he has fallen in love with Buffy. He becomes a more active participant in the Scooby Gang, jumping into several of Buffy's fights to provide assistance, whether she wants it or not. When Buffy rejects his advances, Spike attempts to prove his love by kidnapping her so that she can witness him killing Drusilla for her, to little avail; in her disgust, Buffy un-invites him from her house (something she had not bothered to do in almost three years since their alliance against Angelus) and alienates him from the group.

Spike then has Warren Mears make a robot in Buffy's likeness, programmed to love and obey him. Though Buffy is disgusted by this, her hostility towards him fades considerably when she learns that Spike refused, even under intense torture, to reveal the identity of the Key to Glory, nearly laying down his life to protect Buffy's sister Dawn. Buffy is moved by this unexpected loyalty and kisses him, saying she will not forget what he has done. In the days and hours leading up to the final showdown with Glory, Spike fights by Buffy's side, earning her trust and a re-invitation to her house. Spike displays unabashed grief after Buffy dies in the showdown with Glory. He honors her memory by remaining loyal to the Scoobies, fighting at their side and serving the role of babysitter / older brother / protector to Dawn, helping Willow and Tara to raise her in Buffy's absence.

After Buffy is resurrected at the beginning of season 6, she is despondent and detached from her friends. During this time, her relationship to Spike deepens and she is able to talk to him about things she feels she cannot share with the Scooby Gang. She gets drunk with Spike, and calls him "a neutered vampire who cheats at kitten poker." After a demon's spell makes them express their emotions in song, and Buffy sings "I want the fire back", Buffy and Spike begin a physical relationship, consummated two episodes later. The relationship is frequently violent, with Buffy most often initiating both the violence and the sex between them; the violence is made all the easier when Spike finds that (as a side effect of Willow's resurrection spell) his chip now does not stop him from harming Buffy. Buffy threatens to kill Spike if he ever tells anyone about their relationship. Buffy is ashamed of her dark desires, while Spike obsessively craves the love, trust, and affection that she is unwilling to give. In "As You Were", Buffy ends her relationship with Spike, telling him that she cannot love him nor can she keep using him to avoid her problems at it is killing her to do so. Believing he still has a chance with Buffy after seeing her reactions of jealousy and hurt when he has a drunk sexual encounter with Anya, Spike corners her and makes aggressive sexual advances. When she refuses him, he grows desperate and attacks her, nearly raping her in the process—though Buffy manages to kick him off long enough for him to realize what he was about to do and stop himself. Simultaneously horrified by his actions and angry with his status as somewhere between man and monster, Spike leaves Sunnydale soon after. He makes his way to a remote area of Africa, where he seeks out a legendary demon shaman and undergoes the Demon Trials, a series of gruelling physical challenges, in return for a wish. Having proven his worthiness by surviving the trials, Spike is granted his wish, which is then revealed to be to have his soul restored.

In season 7, a re-ensouled Spike must cope with the guilt of his past actions and try to win back Buffy's trust. But under influence of the First Evil's hypnotic trigger, Spike unknowingly starts killing again. Upon discovering what he has done, he begs Buffy to stake him, but she refuses and takes him into her house, telling him she has seen him change. Buffy guards and cares for Spike throughout his recovery, telling Spike she believes in him, a statement which later sustains him throughout his imprisonment and torture at the hands of the First. When Spike's chip begins to malfunction, causing him intense pain and threatening to kill him, Buffy trusts him enough to order the Initiative operatives to remove it from his head. When Nikki Wood's son Robin tries to kill Spike, he unwittingly frees Spike from his hypnotic trigger: the song "Early One Morning", a favorite of his mother, which evokes Spike's traumatic memories of his mother's abusive behavior toward him after she turned; after Spike is able to address these issues, he realizes his mother had always loved him, knowledge which frees him from the First's control.

Later in the season, Spike and Buffy achieve an emotional closeness; he alone stays loyal to her when the Scoobies and Potentials mutiny against her, and his words and encouragement give a depressed Buffy the strength to continue fighting. They spend three nights together, one of which Spike describes as the best night of his life, just holding her. It is unclear whether they resume their sexual intimacy during the third night; creator Joss Whedon says on the DVD commentary for "Chosen" that he intentionally left it to the viewers to decide how they felt the relationship progressed. In the final battle inside the Hellmouth, Spike, wearing a mystical amulet, sacrifices himself to destroy the Turok-Han and close the Hellmouth. He is slowly incinerated in the process, but not before Buffy tells him "I love you." He replies, "No, you don't; but thanks for saying it." Even as he burns and crumbles to dust, Spike laughs and revels in the destruction around him and the burning presence of his soul, glad to be able to see the fight to its end. In dying to save the world, he becomes a Champion.

"You listen to me. I've been alive a bit longer than you, and dead a lot longer than that. I've seen things you couldn't imagine, and done things I prefer you didn't. I don't exactly have a reputation for being a thinker. I follow my blood, which doesn't exactly rush in the direction of my brain. So I make a lot of mistakes, a lot of wrong bloody calls. A hundred plus years, and there's only one thing I've ever been sure of: You."

— Spike to Buffy, "Touched"

==== Los Angeles ====
Spike had previously appeared in the season 1 episode of Angel "In the Dark", Spike goes to Los Angeles at the same time as Oz arrives to give Angel the Gem of Amarra, Spike's objective was to get the ring and kill Angel. Oz gives Angel the ring who then hides it in the sewer, just as he is about to leave for another case, he is ambushed by Spike who hits him with a wooden plank, Angel defeats Spike but Spike warns him that he will get the ring one way or another. Angel takes precaution and goes on a manhunt for Spike, Angel finally finds him, chases him through the alley, and corners him only to fall into Spike's trap. Spike captures Angel and hires a vampire named Marcus to torture Angel until he tells him where the ring is. After a while Spike gets bored with waiting so he goes to Angel's apartment to find the ring and leaving Marcus to torture Angel, he gets to the apartment only to find Cordelia and Doyle aiming at him with weapons and demanding to know where Angel is. Spike reveals Angel's location and tells them that the only way he will release Angel is if they find him the ring. Cordelia and Doyle find the ring in the sewer and head straight to Spike. When they arrive at the location they find out that Spike had lied about releasing Angel. Taking precautions however, they then throw the ring away and just as Spike was about to retrieve it, Oz bursts through the wall in his van and rescues Angel. Spike looks for the ring but finds out that Marcus took it. Spike begins smashing Marcus's things and shouting about how he is going to work alone from now on until a hole that was in the ceiling lets sunlight in and sets the back of his hair on fire.

Despite his apparent death at the end of Buffy's final season, Spike returns in the fifth and final season of the spin-off series Angel. Resurrected by the amulet in the Los Angeles branch of supernatural law firm Wolfram & Hart, he spends seven episodes as an incorporeal being akin to a ghost; he starts to understand being one when he battles "the Reaper" Matthias Pavayne. During this time he realizes he is being slowly pulled into hell. Later he becomes corporeal, due to a mysterious gift that arrives at the office of Wolfram and Hart. After this, Spike takes on Angel to prove which one of them is the Champion spoken of in the Shanshu Prophecy. Spike defeats Angel, but the prophecy remains ambiguous (the Cup of Torment is revealed as a fake containing Mountain Dew). Manipulated by Lindsey McDonald into "helping the helpless", Spike becomes a sort of rival to Angel; resembling the heroic Champion Angel was in earlier seasons before becoming disillusioned and corrupted by the bureaucracy of Wolfram & Hart. Soon afterward he is kidnapped by the psychotic Slayer Dana, who believes he was responsible for kidnapping and torturing her as a child. Cordelia comments on this strange turn of events after coming out of her coma in "You're Welcome", exclaiming to Angel, "Okay, Spike's a hero, and you're CEO of Hell, Incorporated. What freaking bizarro world did I wake up in?"

When Fred is killed by Illyria, Spike mourns her death and decides to join Team Angel in her honor. Upon learning that Buffy is now dating The Immortal, Spike and Angel travel to Rome on the pretext of business but spend most of the time there trying to find Buffy. In the end, they fail to catch up with her. (The blonde glimpsed in Rome is later revealed to be a decoy Buffy, set up by Andrew Wells, who had researched the history between Angel, Spike and The Immortal, and thought the idea would be "hilarious".) During the final episodes of Angel, Spike is the first to vote for Angel's plan to wound the Senior Partners by massacring the Circle of the Black Thorn. He then spends what might be his last hours on Earth returning to his mortal roots as a frustrated poet, triumphantly knocking them dead (figuratively) in an open mic poetry slam at a bar. After single-handedly (literally, he held the baby in one hand and a sword in the other) rescuing an infant and destroying the Fell Brethren, Spike joins Angel, Illyria, and a badly wounded Charles Gunn in the alley behind the Hyperion as the series draws to an end, preparing to incur the apocalyptic wrath of the Senior Partners, as a way of going out in a blaze of glory that will probably cost their lives.

=== Literature ===
Spike appears significantly in a number of canonical Expanded Universe literature concurrent with and subsequent to the television series, including both Buffy and Angel comic books. Many of these novels and comic books concern Spike's backstory in the periods between the events shown in flashbacks in the television series. From 2007, both Dark Horse Comics and IDW Publishing began telling canonical continuations of Buffy and Angel, respectively. Marsters himself wrote for the miniseries Spike & Dru in 2000. The collection also featured the Christopher Golden stories "The Queen of Hearts", "All's Fair", "Paint the Town Red" and "Who Made Who?", set in or around episodes of Buffy in seasons 2 and 4; "Who Made Who" is set during the Buffy episode "Lovers Walk" and depicts the disintegration of his relationship with Drusilla when they were together in Brazil. After Buffy finished in 2003, Spike appeared in a comic story from the canonical Tales of the Vampires series. Written by series writer Drew Goddard, "The Problem with Vampires" establishes his adventures in Prague prior to his introduction Buffy episode "School Hard". Christopher Golden's 2000 novel Spike and Dru: Pretty Maids All in a Row depicts Spike killing a Slayer named Sophie in the 1940s, contradicting the two Slayers whom Spike is later established to have killed; the second Slayer Spike killed was established as New Yorker Nikki Wood. The short story "Voodoo Lounge" from the collection Tales of the Slayer is a sequel to this novel. Golden's 2006 novel, Blackout, is truer to the series' chronology by depicting Spike's fatal encounter with Slayer Nikki Wood in 1977. Diana G. Gallagher's 2005 novel Spark and Burn depicts the struggling early-season 7 Spike remembering an account of his life, amounting to a chronological character history of Spike's life from the 19th century to the time of the framing device.

This promotional poster for Brian Lynch's IDW Spike series was drawn by artist Franco Urru in response to the spoiler leak controversy for the Dark Horse Comics series Buffy the Vampire Slayer Season Eight. The image is reflective of Spike's role in both franchises. Note that as the series' central character, Spike receives his own stylised logo.

Most Spike-centric stories, however, have been published subsequent to Angel's finale episode. The 2005 IDW comic book Spike: Old Times, by Peter David, depicts Spike's encounter with the vengeance demon Halfrek, explaining his recognition of her in Buffy episode "Older and Far Away", and clarifying that she was in fact his beloved Cecily. Mutant Enemy approved the story, even though IDW did not have rights to a Buffy-only character like Halfrek, because of her importance to Spike's backstory, on the condition that the story's timing was deliberately ambiguous. Following Angel's cancellation, Spike immediately appeared in the Angel miniseries Spike vs. Dracula by Peter David, a sequel to the Buffy episode "Buffy vs. Dracula" and expanding on the characters' century-old rivalry established in that episode. Scott Tipton's 2006 comic Spike: Old Wounds is detective fiction set during season 5, and also features allusions to Spike's activities in the late 1940s. Tipton's Spike: Lost and Found in 2006 is a season 5 story that acts as a sequel to the 1999 Buffy/Angel crossover episodes "The Harsh Light of Day" and "In the Dark", featuring the immortality-bestowing Gem of Amarra in 2005 Los Angeles. Lastly, writer Brian Lynch teamed up with Franco Urru to produce the story arc Spike: Asylum (2006–07), depicting Spike's stay in a supernatural medical facility. Although originally of the same ambiguous relationship to canon, the characters it introduced would reappear in the canonical Angel comic books to come later. Whedon appreciated Lynch's writing of Spike in Asylum so much that he commissioned him to co-write the canonical continuation of the series, Angel: After the Fall, in 2007. Lynch and Urru also penned Spike: Shadow Puppets, featuring Spike and Lorne doing battle with the muppet demons of Angel episode "Smile Time" in Japan. In the explicitly canonical Whedon stories of 2007, Spike and Angel first appear in a joint cameo in Buffy the Vampire Slayer Season Eight (Dark Horse) as part of Buffy's sexual fantasies. In the Dark Horse Presents #24 Season Eight tie-in, "Always Darkest", Spike and Angel appear (again in a dream sequence) at Buffy's side when she is fighting Caleb, but to her dismay the two start flirting with and kissing one another. Spike appears in Season Eight properly at the conclusion of the "Twilight" story arc. Lynch's Spike series features some collaboration with Whedon to connect the IDW and Dark Horse series' continuities. IDW had planned to launch the series as a bona fide ongoing series, and as such it establishes a support cast for Spike suited to his position headlining the title. The transfer of Angel rights from IDW to Dark Horse necessitated that it end instead as an 8-issue miniseries.

In IDW's Angel: After the Fall, Spike does not appear until the second issue, written by Brian Lynch with art by Franco Urru (the creative team of Spike: Asylum and Spike: Shadow Puppets) with plotting and "executive production" by Whedon himself. In Angel: After the Fall, Spike has adjusted to Los Angeles' new status as a literal hell on Earth; he and Illyria both serve together as the Demon Lords of Beverly Hills, living in the Playboy Mansion after the death of Hugh Hefner and served by a harem of human and demon females known collectively as the "Spikettes." How Spike and Illyria got to be Lords of Los Angeles is detailed in the Spike: After the Fall (2008) miniseries, which also introduces a human friend for Spike in Jeremy Johns. In their new capacity, Spike and Illyria secretly rescue humans and benevolent demons, evacuating them into the care of Connor, Nina Ash, and Gwen Raiden. Spike rallies alongside Angel against the other demon Lords. When vampire Gunn causes Illyria to revert to her monster form, memories of Fred from Spike and Wesley are transplanted into her to restore her humanity. After the Senior Partners revert time to before the Fall, Spike begins a loosely affiliated relationship with the reformed Angel Investigations company, collaborating with Angel and his associates while maintaining independence. Spike continues to appear in the ongoing Angel spin-off series by IDW, under the pens of Kelley Armstrong, Bill Willingham and others. As part of its After the Fall franchise, IDW also published Bill Williams' miniseries, Spike: The Devil You Know (2010), which follows Spike's journey from Los Angeles to Las Vegas, where he acquires a spaceship and a crew of alien bugs after learning from Wolfram & Hart of a prophecy concerning the impending apocalypse (featured in Buffy) which has driven them to abandon this dimension.

Spike's IDW series feeds into the "Twilight" and "Last Gleaming" arcs of Buffy Season Eight, concluding that series in 2011. In Season Eight, Spike and his crew come to Buffy's aid to help prevent the end of the universe. Due to his own research into the prophecies concerning this apocalypse, Spike is able to lead Buffy and friends to the site of the final showdown with Twilight. When Buffy's decision sees the world lose its magic, Spike is the only one to be emphatically supportive of the decision she had to make. In the follow-up series Season Nine (2011–2013), Spike bases his ship in San Francisco to be near Buffy, but eventually leaves due to the complicatedness of their relationship, setting up the miniseries Spike: A Dark Place (2012), which follows Spike and his insectoid crew aboard his spaceship. Dark Horse also gives the Spike title a new stylised logo, distinct from the Angel-typeface logo used prior. The arc serves to divest Spike of the ship and crew, and sets up his 2013 crossover stint in Angel & Faith ahead of an eventual return to the main Buffy series. In issues of Angel & Faith, Spike helps Angel defeat a demon in possession of Giles' soul, but leaves London where they are based without hesitation when he learns that Dawn is gravely unwell back in San Francisco. He returns to San Francisco to provide comfort to Dawn who is rapidly fading away without magic in the world to sustain her form. However, his memories of her start to quickly fade and recordings he makes of himself talking about her turn to static. Spike appears unconcerned he missed the chance to talk to Buffy who, along with Willow and Xander, has gone to find magic to save Dawn at the Deeper Well in England. When nobody can remember the name of Buffy's sister, he phones her boyfriend Xander, and also warns him that the rogue Slayer Simone Doffler has been seeking a way to become the ultimate vampire. When the others return and Dawn is restored Buffy thanks him for staying with her sister, Spike says all that matters to him is that Dawn is safe again. Spike continues to appear in Season 10, in which he and Buffy finally resume their romantic relationship while juggling the responsibility of rewriting the new rules of magic with the rest of the Scoobies. In Season 11, he alongside Willow and Buffy, enter a demon internment camp where they uncover a government plot to drain the world's magic. In the final fight against White House Press Secretary Johanna Wise, who spearheaded the conspiracy, he and Buffy sustain serious magical burns–though both are nearly fully recovered soon after due to augmented supernatural healing abilities. In the final issue, they tell each other they love each other and kiss.

== Characterization ==
=== Personality ===
As a human, William's core personality traits were passion and loyalty, though both were heavily sublimated by the conventions of Victorian England. As a product of his time, he channelled these attributes in conventional pursuits, such as nurturing an unrequited romance, an active scholarly life, and care for his ill mother. Highly creative and imaginative, William devoted considerable time to study, reflection, and literary arts, particularly romantic poetry. While his most fervent aspiration was to achieve recognition and acceptance by his peers, romantic interests, and literary community, his pervasive fear of rejection held him back from taking risks; as such, most of his contemporaries regarded him as a timid object of ridicule.

Upon becoming a vampire, his newfound romance with Drusilla, acceptance into a new peer group with Angel and Darla, mixed with the radical changes to his physiology (particularly physical strength), completely dissolved his fears in an experience he considered to be "profound." The sudden erosion of his societal and emotional barriers created dramatic shifts in his attitude and behaviors, allowing him to craft an entirely new persona that was enthusiastic to the point of recklessness, fearless in confrontation, and which reveled in having the power to flout laws and traditional morality. William so embraced this lifestyle that he no longer felt his name was appropriate, instead adopting the name, "Spike", as his infamy grew for torturing victims with railroad spikes; in his words, he "had to die before [he] really felt alive". Spike is also rare among vampires because he does not fear Slayers; he seeks them out and has killed two by the time he arrives in Sunnydale.

Spike is a highly perceptive and emotionally intelligent vampire, which starkly contrasts his raucous "devil-may-care" attitude. As a soulless vampire, his core personality remained intact but less inhibited, exhibiting the capacity for passion and deep affection, loyalty, and aesthetic appreciation. Later, after securing the return of his soul, his conscience returned without his old inhibitions, leaving his love of "a good brawl" unapologetically intact. Similarly, Spike's intense zest for life (a passion for art, love of life, devotion to specific people) remains consistent.

"You're not friends. You'll never be friends. You'll be in love 'til it kills you both. You'll fight, and you'll shag, and you'll hate each other 'til it makes you quiver but you'll never be friends. Love isn't brains, children, it's blood; blood screaming inside you to work its will. I may be love's bitch, but at least I'm man enough to admit it."

— Spike to Angel and Buffy, "Lovers Walk"

Quick wit is one of the character's hallmarks, as Spike enjoys verbal sparring as much as physical fighting; in all his appearances, he has a habit of pithy remarks and glib insults, even toward the few he does not view as antagonists. Among his favorite targets are Angel, Xander, Giles, and (to a lesser extent) Buffy – in season 5's episode The Gift as he and Giles are leaving to fight Glory, he wryly paraphrases Giles' quotation of Shakespeare's Henry V 'we band of brothers' speech to 'we band of buggered'. Joss Whedon credits this antipathy as what convinced him in the episode "Lovers Walk" to bring Spike back as a cast regular. As James Marsters put it, "I was supposed to be the one who stood at the side and said, 'Buffy, you're stupid, and we're all gonna die'."

Spike often nicknames people, both as insults and as terms of endearment; for example, he calls Dawn "Little Bit" or "the Niblet". Spike's classical romanticism also manifests in his frequent references to poetry, songs, and literature; on occasion he even waxes poetic on the nature of love, life, and unlife as being driven by blood, reasoning that blood is more powerful than any supernatural force because it is what separates the living from the dead.

Frequently, the power of Spike's passions override his physical limitations. His pain tolerance, in particular, is exceptionally high due to his willingness to disregard physical discomfort in favor of his goals, interpersonal attachments, and general defiance of any limitation. Notably, when Glory tortures him to reveal the identity of the Key, he defies and insults her at every opportunity; privately, he later reveals in confidence that he would rather die than see Buffy hurt. In terms of his defiant nature, he often treats his vulnerability to the sun as simply an annoying inconvenience. He drives in broad daylight in vehicles with blacked-out windows (often listening to punk rock while he does so), and on several occasions travels outside during the day using only a blanket for cover.

Since becoming a vampire, Spike's core personality trait of loyalty has occasionally been at odds with his resentment of being controlled. While he prefers to see himself as a rebel against any kind of authority, he recognizes that his devotion has allowed others to manipulate him and, at times, for him to put self-imposed limits on himself for the sake of others. In an extreme example, Angel was able to manipulate Spike's allegiance based on his attachment to Drusilla; in a less extreme example, he often modifies his crass tendencies around Dawn to keep from disappointing Buffy, though he ceases when she is not around.

Like many characters in the series, Spike has battled depression at times; however, this was less a tendency towards self-pity or a psychological character trait than a reaction to new limitations. After being 'chipped' by the Initiative, Spike's inability to act out violence put him at odds with his desire to resist control and authority, and he became sullen when the pain inflicted by the chip was simply too powerful to resist. Upon realizing that he could still battle (and kill) demons and other supernatural creatures, his confidence immediately returned. Later, Spike's greatest internal conflict arose due to simultaneously wanting to kill the Slayer (Buffy) due to her authority and position as the "one thing" that vampires fear, until discovering in a revelatory dream that he was in fact, in love with her. Recognizing that his affection for her gave her power over him caused him a great deal of self-doubt; seeing no other means to reconcile the dissonance, he chose instead to 'rebel' against his vampire nature itself, and eventually seek to be re-ensouled and purify his passions.

=== Appearance ===
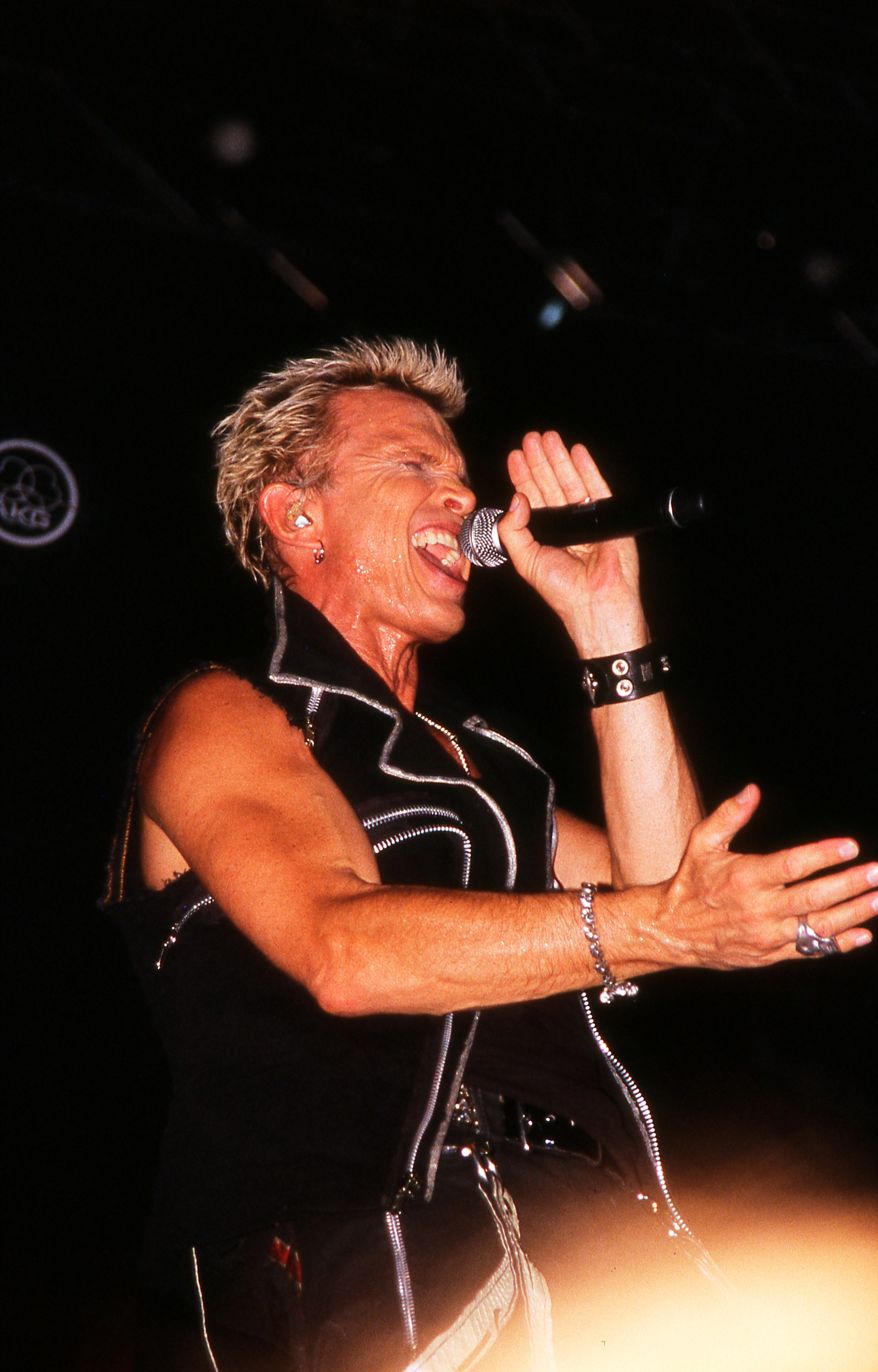
The character's look has been compared with rock musician Billy Idol (pictured)

Spike has a punk look which strongly resembles English rock musician Billy Idol; humorously, Buffy claims that Billy Idol in fact stole his look from Spike. His hair is peroxide blond for the duration of his time on Buffy and Angel, although in flashbacks it can be seen in its natural medium brown state as well as dyed black. His nails are often painted black and was often paired with “guyliner”.

Buffy: I need some help. I'm looking for this guy. Bleach-blonde hair, leather jacket, British accent? Kind of sallow, but in a hot way?
Bouncer: Yeah, yeah, I know the guy. Billy Idol wannabe?
Buffy: Actually, Billy Idol stole his look from... Never mind.

— "Sleeper"

A Y-shaped scar on Marsters's left eyebrow, received during a mugging, was worked into the show; make-up artist Todd McIntosh decided to shave out his eyebrow in order to make it more prominent. He also included the scar on Spike's "vamp face" prosthesis, albeit slightly altered as though the skin has stretched. In Spike's first appearances the wound still looks fresh, but it gradually fades until, in Angel season 5, it is barely visible. A flashback in "Fool for Love" reveals that Spike received the scar from the sword of the first Slayer he killed in 1900.

Spike usually wears long black leather coats, including one that he took from a Nazi officer and another that he took as a trophy from Nikki Wood, the second Slayer he killed. He wore the Slayer's black duster for over twenty-five years. When the coat was destroyed by a bomb from the Immortal in Italy, Spike heartbrokenly declared it to be irreplaceable; but the Italian branch of Wolfram & Hart quickly supplied him with a whole wardrobe of new ones, nearly identical, which he happily began wearing. His trademark look includes the leather duster, a black T-shirt or v-neck shirt and black denim pants, usually with heavy boots or Doc Martens. He also wore a red long-sleeved shirt fairly often, particularly during the earlier seasons of Buffy, and a bright blue shirt early in Season 6 & 7. He explained that the shirt was supposed to show Buffy that he had changed and give him confidence (because the First was messing with his head and he did not want Buffy to think he was still evil or crazy). But later, he returned to his trademark look, commenting that he was back.

== Powers and abilities ==
In addition to possessing the common powers and weaknesses of vampires, Spike's age and experience makes him a highly effective, skilled, and versatile fighter in both armed and unarmed combat. For example, he is able to briefly overcome Illyria during a testing of her abilities prior to her powers being greatly reduced by Wesley. Illyria criticizes his (and others') ability to adapt, calling it "compromise." He is able to withstand excessive amounts of pain for extended periods of time, particularly when properly motivated, as seen in the episodes "Intervention" and "Showtime". While not as skilled or as sadistic as Angelus, Spike also proves himself to be effective at torture, noting he had gained "screams, various fluids, and a name" from Doctor Sparrow. Much like Angel, he is highly proficient in various forms of martial arts, and his typical fighting style blends karate, kung fu, and others.

Spike often displays insight and skills in perception and observation, especially with regard to relationships and personalities, so long as the relationship in question does not concern him personally. This ability allows him to wield powerful psychological weapons as easily and effectively as physical ones. For example, when he wants to create disharmony among the Scoobies, Spike divides-and-conquers with "The Yoko Factor", exploiting tensions that exist under the surface to alienate Buffy and her friends against each other. Spike's skills of analysis allowed him to realize Willow was barely holding it together after Oz's departure even though Giles and Buffy thought she was doing better, to be the first to see through Tara's abusive and controlling family, forced Buffy and Angel to admit that they were more than "just friends" and identify when and why some relationships, such as between Buffy and Riley, are not meant to last, masterfully feeding Riley's insecurities in an effort to sabotage his relationship with Buffy, so Spike can pursue her. He also predicted that Willow would go fighting against Glory after what she did to Tara even though Buffy believed that she had talked Willow out of the suicidal attempt because he would do so if Glory hurt the people he loved.

His analytical skills and intuitive insight also help him in battle from time to time, helping him to defeat, or hold his own against, very formidable adversaries. For example, he explains to Buffy he was able to defeat two Slayers because he sensed and exploited their secret desires to be free of their burden. In "Time Bomb", he identifies Illyria's fighting style as a Tae Kwon Do/Brazilian Capoeira / Ninjitsu hybrid.

While many vampires cling to the mannerisms and speech patterns of the time they were sired, Spike has been shown to easily adjust to changing fashions and styles. He displays an extensive knowledge of British and American popular culture.

Although capable of developing sound battle strategies, Spike (particularly in the days before receiving his chip and being re-ensouled) often loses patience with anything more complicated than outright attack.

He is also impatient to fight the Slayer upon his initial arrival in Sunnydale; the attack is supposed to coincide with the Night of St. Vigeous (when a vampire's natural abilities are enhanced), but he "couldn't wait" to go after the Slayer and recklessly leads a mass assault against Buffy at Sunnydale High, which fails and results in the deaths of many Aurelian vampires. However, Spike did exercise patience throughout the latter half of season 2 of Buffy, when he used a wheelchair for several months after a brutal battle with the Scoobies in the episode "What's My Line" left him paraplegic. He feigned weakness and endured weeks of watching Angelus pursue Drusilla as he waited for the right time to strike against his enemy.

Spike's "vampire constitution" provides him with an extremely high tolerance for alcohol (which he regularly consumes in copious quantities). His experience in crime gives him skill at picking locks, hotwiring cars and picking pockets. He is also capable of easily operating various vehicles, such as various cars, a Honda CB400T motorcycle ("Bargaining part 2"), and a Winnebago ("Spiral"). He has also been shown using video game systems and a computer, treating injuries, and playing poker and pool. Spike is also seen speaking/understanding Latin, Luganda (a language of Uganda, where he meets the demon shaman), and the language of Fyarl demons, two of whom he once employed as muscle during his pre-Sunnydale days. He is also shown to be capable of recognizing literature; in the last episode of season 5, he paraphrases a line from the St. Crispin's Day Speech while in conversation with Giles after Buffy tells them her plan of attack on Glory.

When Spike was transformed into a ghost-like intangible state following the destruction of Sunnydale and the Hellmouth and his subsequent materialization at Wolfram & Hart, he was capable of walking through solid objects. He was initially unable to make contact with objects around him until he learned how to focus his abilities through desire, allowing him to make brief contact with people and things if he concentrated enough. This ability was relatively useless in a fight; he was unable to pick up a wooden bar to hit the demon Tezcatcatl in "The Cautionary Tale of Numero Cinco", and required a few moments to properly punch a cyborg strangling Gunn in "Lineage". Naturally, he lost these capabilities when he was recorporealized by Lindsey.

== Unproduced spin-off movie ==
In 2004, Joss Whedon set plans for a Spike movie. The film, if ever greenlit, would star James Marsters, Alyson Hannigan and Amy Acker. At a 2006 convention, Acker stated the film was not going ahead due to money issues.

== Reception ==
In 1999, Spike won a TV Guide Award for "Scariest Villain."

For his role of Spike, James Marsters won Saturn Award for Best Supporting Actor in a TV Series in 2000 and 2003, and was nominated for the award in 1999, 2001, 2002, and 2004.

Spike is also featured in Forbes magazine's "Hollywood's Most Powerful Vampires" list along with Angel.

Spike was ranked #2 out of 177 on BuzzFeed's list of "117 Buffyverse Characters, Ranked From Worst To Best.

Spike was placed first in SFX magazine's "Top 50 Vampires" on television and movies list. The same list featured rival Angel in the third place. Spike was described as an "antihero in the true sense of the word, Spike is morally ambiguous and ready to fight pretty much anyone, for fun. But underneath it all, he loves deeply and earnestly in a way that remains achingly human. Although, ironically, his personality remains pretty much the same, whether he has a soul or not — in stark (and more entertaining) contrast to Angel." Other Buffyverse vampires to appear on the list included Drusilla (at 10th place), Darla (at 25th place), Vampire Willow (at 32nd place), Harmony Kendall (at 31st place), and the Master (at 39th place).

In 2017, Spike made the list of "25 Villains We Love to Hate from the last 25 years" for the 25th anniversary of Syfy.

TVLine ranked Spike as 6th on their Best TV Vampires of All Time list in 2020. He shares the list with fellow Buffyverse characters Drusilla (at 19th place), Darla (at 18th place), and Angel (at 1st place).

In 2021, when discussing accusations of workplace harassment by Whedon, Marsters said that Whedon intended for Spike to be killed off from Buffy because "in Joss's world evil is not cool" and the show already had "a sexy vampire" in Angel. Because of the positive audience reaction, the network insisted that Spike survive. Marsters said, "I was basically ruining [Joss's] show," changing it from parables about teenage adolescence to one in which "those problems are kind of sexy."

Marsters recalled that the Buffy audience loved Spike and demanded more of the character. That annoyed Whedon so much that he pushed Marsters against a wall and told him, "I don't care how popular you are, okay? You are dead, you are dead, you are dead, you got me?" Marsters believed that Whedon was not joking about killing off his character and said that he would not disagree with the veracity of his Buffy castmates' harassment allegations. He cited another incident in which Marsters told Whedon, "It must be wonderful to wind up this universe and watch it play out." Whedon responded, "Yeah, it's great, James, except I have to keep winding!" Marsters described both conversations as examples of Whedon's intensity toward the cast, caused by the great pressure the show creator put on himself.

In 2022, British GQ placed Spike in 11th place on their "Pop culture's best vampires" list. He is the only vampire from the Buffyverse to be featured. That same year, Syfy placed Spike on their list of their "fanged favorites from television and film."

In a 2023 interview, James Marsters said he would've killed off his character in "a heartbeat" if he was in charge of the series after he noticed that Spike was changing the fan perspective toward the vampires on the show. The original idea for Buffy was that vampires were just metaphors for the challenges of high school or the challenges of life," he explained. "They were designed to be overcome; they were designed to die. Buffy is not an Anne Rice kind of thing, where you're supposed to feel for the vampires. It's why we're hideously ugly when we bite someone. They did not want that to be a sensual kind of thing. It was supposed to be horrific." Because of this, Marsters said, the decision to keep weaving Spike into the show's longterm arc was "a weird fit." He admitted that he thought "they never really knew what to do" with his character, who quickly became a fan favorite, or how he should be part of the larger storyline." Every season, the writers would come to him and admit not knowing what to do with the character, but were eventually "able to figure something out" for Spike to do each episode.

MovieWeb placed Spike in 1st place on their 25 All-Time Best Vampires in Movie and TV History list in 2023.

In the summer of 2024, Comic Book Resources listed Spike as 10th place on their 25 Strongest Vampires list. Angel is also featured on the list at 15th place.
