= You're Welcome (Angel) =

- Angel episode
- Episode no.: Season 5 Episode 12
- Directed by: David Fury
- Written by: David Fury
- Production code: 5ADH12
- Original air date: February 4, 2004

Guest appearances
- Charisma Carpenter as Cordelia Chase; Christian Kane as Lindsey McDonald; Mercedes McNab as Harmony Kendall; Sarah Thompson as Eve; Glenn Quinn as Doyle (archive footage)

Episode chronology
← Previous "Damage"	Next → "Why We Fight"
- Angel season 5

"You're Welcome" is the twelfth episode of the fifth season of the American television series Angel. Written and directed by David Fury, it is the 100th episode of the series, and originally broadcast on February 4, 2004 on the WB network. In "You're Welcome," former series regular Charisma Carpenter returns as a guest star, when the character of Cordelia Chase miraculously awakens from her coma. It is her duty to put Angel, who has recently been feeling ineffective at fighting the powers of darkness, back on the right path. Meanwhile, Angel's old enemy Lindsey McDonald has resurfaced and is plotting revenge. This episode features the death and final onscreen appearance of Cordelia.

The episode was written to reinforce the show's earlier themes, and examine the evolution of the characters in the show's one hundred episodes. The original plan was for Sarah Michelle Gellar to return as Buffy Summers, but when she could not appear due to the death of her aunt and work obligations, it instead focused on rounding off the character of Cordelia. The episode proved generally popular with critics, who praised Charisma Carpenter's final performance as Cordelia and the sense of resolution for the character.

== Plot ==
Cordelia emerges from her coma after experiencing a vision of the symbols painted on Eve's apartment door and tattooed on Lindsey's chest. After Angel and Wesley collect Cordelia from the hospital, she reveals that the vision which woke her from the coma showed Angel in peril. She finds the symbols from her vision in a book, and Wesley recognizes them as runes to protect and conceal, effective against surveillance. Cordelia apologizes to Wesley for killing Lilah while under Jasmine's control.

Spike complains to Lindsey (who is impersonating Doyle) that the deranged slayer chopped off his hands. Lindsey reveals he also had one of his hands severed. Spike bites Cordelia until Angel fights him off. Spike explains he was tasting whether she was evil, as his source claimed. Angel questions the source, and Spike says it was Doyle. Angel confronts Eve, suggesting she is working with the Doyle impersonator manipulating Spike. Eve confesses that Lindsey is activating a fail-safe left by the Senior Partners to destroy Angel. When Spike mentions "Doyle" had a hand chopped off, Angel deduces that "Doyle" is Lindsey. Angel battles Lindsey, who is strengthened by his runes. While Angel and Lindsey fight, Cordelia disables the fail-safe. Wesley and Fred perform a spell that causes Lindsey's tattoos to disappear, making him visible to the Senior Partners. Lindsey is sucked into a portal.

Angel and Cordelia say their goodbyes and share a kiss. Angel receives a phone call informing him that Cordelia has died. He realizes, with teary eyes, that Cordelia never awoke from her coma.

== Production ==
The fight scene between Lindsey and Angel in the underground chamber, which took three days to film, was written by Steven S. DeKnight. Christian Kane, who went through 2 1/2 months of sword training for his role in Secondhand Lions, approached the writers to see if they could work his new skills into the episode; Kane ended up performing his own stunts for the sword fight sequence, including wire work. He also did his own stunts for the scene when Lindsey moves through the lasers in the tunnel, which were not CGI, but actual lasers. During the fight scene between Eve and Harmony, Sarah Thompson says Mercedes McNab slapped her accidentally. "She was... so worried she'd hurt me but it actually worked well for the take because I reacted by really screaming," Thompson says.

David Boreanaz had just had knee surgery prior to filming, so writer David Fury did his best to keep Angel sitting down as much as possible. Fury used tight camera angles during Spike's apartment scene with Lindsey to disguise the fact that the same set was used earlier for the opening teaser. "Everything is a bit contained; the reason is if I turn around, this is where they found the dead nuns," Fury explains.

=== Writing ===
Joss Whedon says he used the 100th episode to reinforce the "mission statement" of the show, as well as assess where the characters are now compared to how they began. Whedon explains this episode presents an ideal opportunity to - through Cordelia, who was "there at the beginning" - ask of Angel, "Where are you now? Where were you when you started and where are you now and how do you feel about that?" The return to the show's "original concerns" is echoed by the flashback to Doyle's first season advertisement; Sara Upstone points out aerial images of Los Angeles reappear at the same time Cordelia tells Angel "You forgot who you are," bringing back the show's link to the city. This episode, written as a stand-alone as per the network's request, also sets up a critical plot-thread for the season arc that "will begin to reveal itself toward the end of the season," Whedon says. The character of Buffy Summers was originally intended to appear in the 100th episode, focusing on the rivalry between Angel and Spike and their feelings for Buffy, but Sarah Michelle Gellar was unavailable. Writer/director David Fury explains that since "we couldn't get Sarah," the episode was instead written for Cordelia Chase. He adds, "This turned out to be a Godsend because Charisma was fantastic." In the original script, Fury wrote a conversation between Wesley and Angel while driving to the hospital that set up Cordelia as a possible comatose/unresponsive person. The scene was never shot because "the shock of seeing her up and around after a 9-month coma was enough. We just didn't want to tip it too soon," says Fury.

Christian Kane was genuinely upset when an addition by Joss Whedon in the script called for Angel to refer to Lindsey as a "tiny Texan." Although born in Texas, Kane identifies as a "Sooner" and "I'm stronger than David, bigger than David, I'm just shorter." Kane says Joss "likes to take shots at me. He's like, 'I can't build this character up too much without cutting his nuts just a little bit.'"

== Cast ==
Carpenter says she was satisfied with the way her character left the show, as she feels Cordelia's story has been fully resolved. Creator Joss Whedon agreed, saying, "In seven years, we'd sort of run through our course of [the] character and didn't want to start just doing hollow riffs on what we'd done." Since Whedon suspected this season would be the last, Carpenter says, "we didn't want to just leave Cordelia in a coma..this would be a very big story left untold." Carpenter says the 100th episode was a momentous time to have her character die, calling it "bittersweet...a love letter to Cordelia" and the story "one of the sweetest they'd ever told." David Fury agrees: "It's a beautiful farewell to Charisma for the series" and it gives "Charisma a send off that was respectful to her and Cordelia Chase. I was very proud to have my name on it."

Actor Christian Kane says he had a difficult time calling himself 'Doyle' because he felt on some level he was masquerading as deceased Glenn Quinn. "It was a very awkward situation for me and David because we were close to Glenn," says Kane. "I didn't know how the fans were going to react to it." Kane says the memory of Quinn upset Boreanaz: "I could see it in his eyes... it’s got to be a tough deal for him." However, Kane thinks that "Joss is brilliant because he used that. How do you turn me and David against each other? You really can’t because we’re such close friends. So to use that for Angel and Lindsey, I think has a little bit of brilliance to it. It’s kind of sick...but it did the job." David Fury adds, "I think [the fans] appreciated it from the standpoint that we were honoring him. That Doyle's not a forgotten piece of this world."

== Reception ==
This episode was rated as one of the series' top five episodes in a poll done by Angel Magazine. TV Guide praised Charisma Carpenter's "blithe comic delivery"; the BBC noted that Carpenter's return elevated the script from "merely great to something close to awesome," but griped because the show's tight budget left Lindsey's activation of the fail-safe an "unfulfilled promise."

Reaction to the death of long-time character Cordelia was generally positive. After being disgusted by Cordelia's fourth season arc, which she claims "destroyed Cordy's character and viewer trust", author Jennifer Crusie applauds this episode. "The writers play fair," she says, "foreshadowing the Gotcha to come" - Cordelia is in a private room, yet hastily draws the curtains around a bed-ridden roommate, and remarks to Angel that she understands why Doyle used his "last breath to make sure [Angel] kept fighting." Rather than undercutting the emotional impact of the story, the twist of Cordelia's tragic ending reinforces and honors her character. "She is...our Cordy again," Crusie says. Cordelia exits the series "needed, loved, and wanted"; her final words are "You're welcome," Janine R. Harrison argues, because "she knows her worth."
