= Angel season 5 =

Angel
- Season 5
- Region 1 Season 5 DVD cover
- Showrunner: Joss Whedon
- Starring: David Boreanaz; James Marsters; J. August Richards; Amy Acker; Andy Hallett; Mercedes McNab; Alexis Denisof
- No. of episodes: 22

Release
- Original network: The WB
- Original release: October 1, 2003 – May 19, 2004

Season chronology
- ← Previous; Season 4

The fifth and final season of the television series Angel, the spin-off of Buffy the Vampire Slayer, premiered on October 1, 2003 on The WB and concluded its 22-episode season and its television run on May 19, 2004. The season aired on Wednesdays at 9:00 pm ET. This is the only season of Angel to air following the finale of Buffy the Vampire Slayer.

== Cast and characters ==
=== Main cast ===
- David Boreanaz as Angel
- James Marsters as Spike
- J. August Richards as Charles Gunn
- Amy Acker as Winifred "Fred" Burkle/Illyria
- Andy Hallett as Lorne
- Mercedes McNab as Harmony Kendall
- Alexis Denisof as Wesley Wyndam-Pryce

=== Recurring cast ===
- Sarah Thompson as Eve
- Christian Kane as Lindsey McDonald
- Jonathan M. Woodward as Knox
- Adam Baldwin as Marcus Hamilton
- Dennis Christopher as Cyvus Vail
- Leland Crooke as Archduke Sebassis
- Jennifer Griffin and Gary Grubbs as Trish and Roger Burkle
- Jenny Mollen as Nina Ash
- Marc Vann as Dr. Sparrow
- Alec Newman as Drogyn
- Vincent Kartheiser as Connor
- Juliet Landau as Drusilla
- Tom Lenk as Andrew Wells

=== Special guest star ===
- Charisma Carpenter as Cordelia Chase

=== Guest cast ===
- Julie Benz as Darla
- Jack Conley as Sahjhan
- Julia Lee as Anne Steele

== Crew ==
Series creator Joss Whedon served as executive producer, now able to concentrate more on Angel as both Buffy the Vampire Slayer and Firefly ended. Whedon wrote and directed two episodes throughout the season ("Conviction" and "A Hole in the World"), co-wrote the story for "Smile Time" and co-wrote (as well as directed a number of scenes of) the series finale, "Not Fade Away". Whedon was originally intended to direct the final episode of the show but his commitments to filming Serenity (the sequel film to Firefly) made it impossible for him to do so. He delegated the task to showrunner Jeffrey Bell who also wrote the episode alongside Whedon. Bell would write and direct only one other episode of the season.

After Buffy ended, David Fury joined the writing staff full-time as co-executive producer, later promoted to executive producer midseason, and wrote or co-wrote four episodes, including writing and directing the 100th episode. Buffy writer Drew Goddard also joined the staff as executive story editor and wrote or co-wrote five episodes. Steven S. DeKnight was promoted to producer, later promoted to supervising producer midseason, and wrote or co-wrote six episodes, two of which he directed. Ben Edlund was promoted to supervising producer and wrote or co-wrote four episodes, including writing and directing "Smile Time". Elizabeth Craft and Sarah Fain were promoted to executive story editors and wrote three episodes. Brent Fletcher, who was a script coordinator, wrote one episode, which was directed by series star David Boreanaz.

Co-creator David Greenwalt, who had left Angel in an official capacity at the end of season three, came back to direct the antepenultimate episode of the series, "The Girl in Question".

== Episodes ==
No. overall	No. in season	Title	Directed by	Written by	Original release date	Prod. code	U.S. viewers (millions)
89	1	"Conviction"	Joss Whedon	Joss Whedon	October 1, 2003	5ADH01	5.16
Taking over the LA offices of Wolfram & Hart proves to be more challenging than expected, especially when Spike shows up back from the dead, out from the amulet that is supposed to be buried deep within the Hellmouth.
90	2	"Just Rewards"	James A. Contner	Story by : David Fury; Teleplay by : David Fury & Ben Edlund	October 8, 2003	5ADH02	5.24
Spike tries to adjust to life as a ghost while the gang deals with a disgruntled client who has power over the dead.
91	3	"Unleashed"	Marita Grabiak	Sarah Fain & Elizabeth Craft	October 15, 2003	5ADH03	5.03
Angel tries to protect a woman named Nina, who has been recently bitten by a werewolf, from a group of people who want to dine on werewolf flesh.
92	4	"Hell Bound"	Steven S. DeKnight	Steven S. DeKnight	October 22, 2003	5ADH04	4.73
Spike struggles to maintain his weak grip on reality as spectral forces threaten to send him to Hell, and Fred races to find a way to give him his body back.
93	5	"Life of the Party"	Bill L. Norton	Ben Edlund	October 29, 2003	5ADH05	4.72
Lorne works around the clock to throw the ultimate Halloween party at Wolfram & Hart, but problems arise when he has his sleep removed.
94	6	"The Cautionary Tale of Numero Cinco"	Jeffrey Bell	Jeffrey Bell	November 5, 2003	5ADH06	4.02
As he questions his own role as a champion, Angel must track down a retired wrestler hero to help him defeat Tezcatcatl, an Aztec demon.
95	7	"Lineage"	Jefferson Kibbee	Drew Goddard	November 12, 2003	5ADH07	4.75
Wolfram & Hart is under attack from cyborg assassins, and Wesley is surprised by the unannounced arrival of his estranged father.
96	8	"Destiny"	Skip Schoolnik	David Fury & Steven S. DeKnight	November 19, 2003	5ADH08	3.96
Spike is recorporealized, and he and Angel battle it out to drink from the "Cup of Perpetual Torment" to settle the renewed conflict of the Shanshu Prophecy.
97	9	"Harm's Way"	Vern Gillum	Elizabeth Craft & Sarah Fain	January 14, 2004	5ADH09	3.80
Already feeling unappreciated at work, Harmony's life in the office gets worse when it appears she has murdered a key player in demonic peace talks.
98	10	"Soul Purpose"	David Boreanaz	Brent Fletcher	January 21, 2004	5ADH10	3.30
Lindsey approaches Spike and claims responsibility for recorporealizing him, and Angel is infected by a parasite that makes him experience nightmares where Spike is the champion and he is ignored.
99	11	"Damage"	Jefferson Kibbee	Steven S. DeKnight & Drew Goddard	January 28, 2004	5ADH11	4.34
Angel and Spike hunt a psychotic Slayer who has escaped from an institution and believes that Spike is the man who drove her insane.
100	12	"You're Welcome"	David Fury	David Fury	February 4, 2004	5ADH12	3.95
Cordelia awakens from her coma with visions of Angel in trouble, pitting Angel against Lindsey in a final battle.
101	13	"Why We Fight"	Terrence O'Hara	Drew Goddard & Steven S. DeKnight	February 11, 2004	5ADH13	3.64
A mysterious man takes the gang hostage and confronts Angel about certain events in his past - specifically, his "service" in the Second World War.
102	14	"Smile Time"	Ben Edlund	Story by : Joss Whedon & Ben Edlund; Teleplay by : Ben Edlund	February 18, 2004	5ADH14	4.15
Demon puppets from a popular children's show steal the life forces of children by hypnotizing them, and Angel is transformed into a puppet when he tries to investigate.
103	15	"A Hole in the World"	Joss Whedon	Joss Whedon	February 25, 2004	5ADH15	3.92
The gang desperately seeks a cure for Fred, who is infected by a demon that was imprisoned inside an ancient sarcophagus.
104	16	"Shells"	Steven S. DeKnight	Steven S. DeKnight	March 3, 2004	5ADH16	3.68
Angel and Spike work to restore Fred as Illyria tries to locate her ancient temple and summon her armies.
105	17	"Underneath"	Skip Schoolnik	Elizabeth Craft & Sarah Fain	April 14, 2004	5ADH17	3.32
Hoping that Lindsey has information on the Senior Partners' ultimate plans, Angel, Spike and Gunn track him down to the hell dimension where he was banished.
106	18	"Origin"	Terrence O'Hara	Drew Goddard	April 21, 2004	5ADH18	3.69
Connor's new parents seek help from Wolfram & Hart about their son's supernatural abilities, and the past comes back to haunt Wesley when he learns about the deal Angel made to save his son.
107	19	"Time Bomb"	Vern Gillum	Ben Edlund	April 28, 2004	5ADH19	4.21
Illyria's powers become unstable, causing her to jump through time, and the gang's attempts to stop her result in her killing them all.
108	20	"The Girl in Question"	David Greenwalt	Steven S. DeKnight & Drew Goddard	May 5, 2004	5ADH20	4.68
Angel and Spike travel to Rome, Italy with plans to rescue Buffy from their old nemesis The Immortal, while simultaneously trying to prevent a demon war; back in Los Angeles, Fred's parents come looking for their daughter, unaware that she is dead.
109	21	"Power Play"	James A. Contner	David Fury	May 12, 2004	5ADH21	4.02
The gang starts to have doubts about Angel's loyalties after witnessing his disturbing behavior and problematic decisions; while Spike is looking for a demon with Illyria, Drogyn – the Guardian of the Deeper Well – arrives to tell Spike that Angel tried to kill him.
110	22	"Not Fade Away"	Jeffrey Bell	Jeffrey Bell & Joss Whedon	May 19, 2004	5ADH22	5.31
Angel and the rest of the group spend the day as if it were their last before moving to take out the Circle of the Black Thorn in a potentially suicidal confrontation.

== Cancellation ==
On February 14, 2004, the WB Network announced that Angel would not be brought back for a sixth season. The one-paragraph statement indicated that the news, which had been reported by an Internet site the previous day, had been leaked well before the network intended to make its announcement. Joss Whedon posted a message on a popular fan site, The Bronze: Beta, in which he expressed his dismay and surprise, saying he was "heartbroken" and described the situation as "Healthy Guy Falls Dead From Heart Attack." Fan reaction was to organize letter-writing campaigns, online petitions, blood and food drives, advertisements in trade magazines and via mobile billboards, and attempts to lobby other networks (UPN was a favorite target, as it had already picked up Buffy). Outrage for the cancellation focused on Jordan Levin, WB's Head of Entertainment. It was the second highest-rated program to be canceled on the WB.

Writer and producer David Fury "guarantees" that if Joss Whedon hadn't requested an early renewal Angel would have been back for a season six:

The only reason that Angel didn't come back...it's a very simple thing. Because our ratings were up, because of our critical attention, Joss specifically asked Jordan Levin, who was the head of The WB at the time, to give us an early pick-up because every year they [would] wait so long to give Angel a pick-up [and] a lot of us [would] turn down jobs hoping that Angel will continue – he [Joss] didn't want that to happen. So, he was feeling very confident and he [Joss] just asked Jordan, "Like, make your decision now whether you're going to pick us up or not," and Jordan, sort of with his hands tied, with his back up against the wall, called him the next day and said, "Okay, we're canceling you." Jordan's no longer there and The WB has since recognized...I believe Garth Ancier at The WB said that it was a big mistake to cancel Angel. There was a power play that happened that just didn't fall out the way they wanted it to. We wanted to get an early pick-up, we didn't. In fact we forced them [The WB] to make a decision, and with his hand forced he [Levin] made the decision to cancel us.

I guarantee that, if we waited as we normally did, by the time May had come around they would have picked up Angel. I can guarantee that.

== Reception ==
The fifth season has a 93% on Rotten Tomatoes based on 14 reviews, with an average rating of 8 out 10. The site's critics consensus reads, "Angel's final season concludes the series with a creative resurgence that restores the show's signature blend of humor and horror, ending on a bittersweet high note that should satisfy fans while leaving them wishing there could have been more."

The fifth season won four Saturn Awards – Best Network Television Series (tied with CSI: Crime Scene Investigation), Best Actor in a Television Series (David Boreanaz), Best Supporting Actor in a Television Series (James Marsters), and Best Supporting Actress in a Television Series (Amy Acker). Alexis Denisof was nominated for Best Supporting Actor in a Television Series and Charisma Carpenter was nominated for Best Supporting Actress in a Television Series. The series, Marsters, and Acker also received nominations again in 2005.

"Smile Time" and "Not Fade Away" were nominated for the Hugo Award for Best Dramatic Presentation, Short Form.

The Futon Critic named "Lineage" the 32nd best episode of 2003, "Smile Time" the 21st best episode 2004 and "Not Fade Away" the 4th best episode of 2004.

The fifth season averaged 3.97 million viewers, slightly higher than season four.

== Comic book continuation ==
After the success of the Buffy the Vampire Slayer Season Eight comic books, Joss Whedon announced a canonical comic book continuation of Angel would be published. Titled Angel: After the Fall, published by IDW Publishing, written by Brian Lynch (along with the help of Whedon), the book takes place after the events of the final episode, with Los Angeles in Hell. The first issue was released on November 21, 2007. Originally released as a 17-issue limited series, the book spawned into an ongoing spin-off series.

== DVD release ==
Angel: The Complete Fifth Season was released on DVD in region 1 on February 15, 2005 and in region 2 on February 21, 2005. The DVD includes all 22 episodes on 6 discs presented in anamorphic widescreen 1.78:1 aspect ratio. Special features on the DVD include seven commentary tracks—"Conviction" by writer/director Joss Whedon; "Destiny" by writers David Fury and Steven S. DeKnight, director Skip Schoolnik and actress Juliet Landau; "Soul Purpose" by writer Brent Fletcher, actor/director David Boreanaz and actor Christian Kane; "You're Welcome" by writer/director David Fury and actors Christian Kane and Sarah Thompson; "A Hole in the World" by writer/director Joss Whedon and actors Alexis Denisof and Amy Acker; "Underneath" by writers Elizabeth Craft and Sarah Fain, director Skip Schoolnik and actor Adam Baldwin; and "Not Fade Away" by co-writer/director Jeffrey Bell. Featurettes include, "Angel 100", a look at the 100th episode celebration party; "To Live & Die in L.A.: The Best of Angel", where Joss Whedon discusses the best episodes of the show; "Halos & Horns: Recurring Villainy", interviews with cast members who played villains over the course of the show; "Hey Kids! It's Smile Time", a featurette on the making of "Smile Time"; "Angel: Choreography of a Stunt", detailing the a performance of a stunt and interview with stunt coordinator Mike Massa; "Angel Unbound: The Gag Reels", a series of outtakes from all five seasons; and "Angel: The Final Season", an overview of the season featuring interviews with cast and crew members.
