= David Fury =

American screenwriter

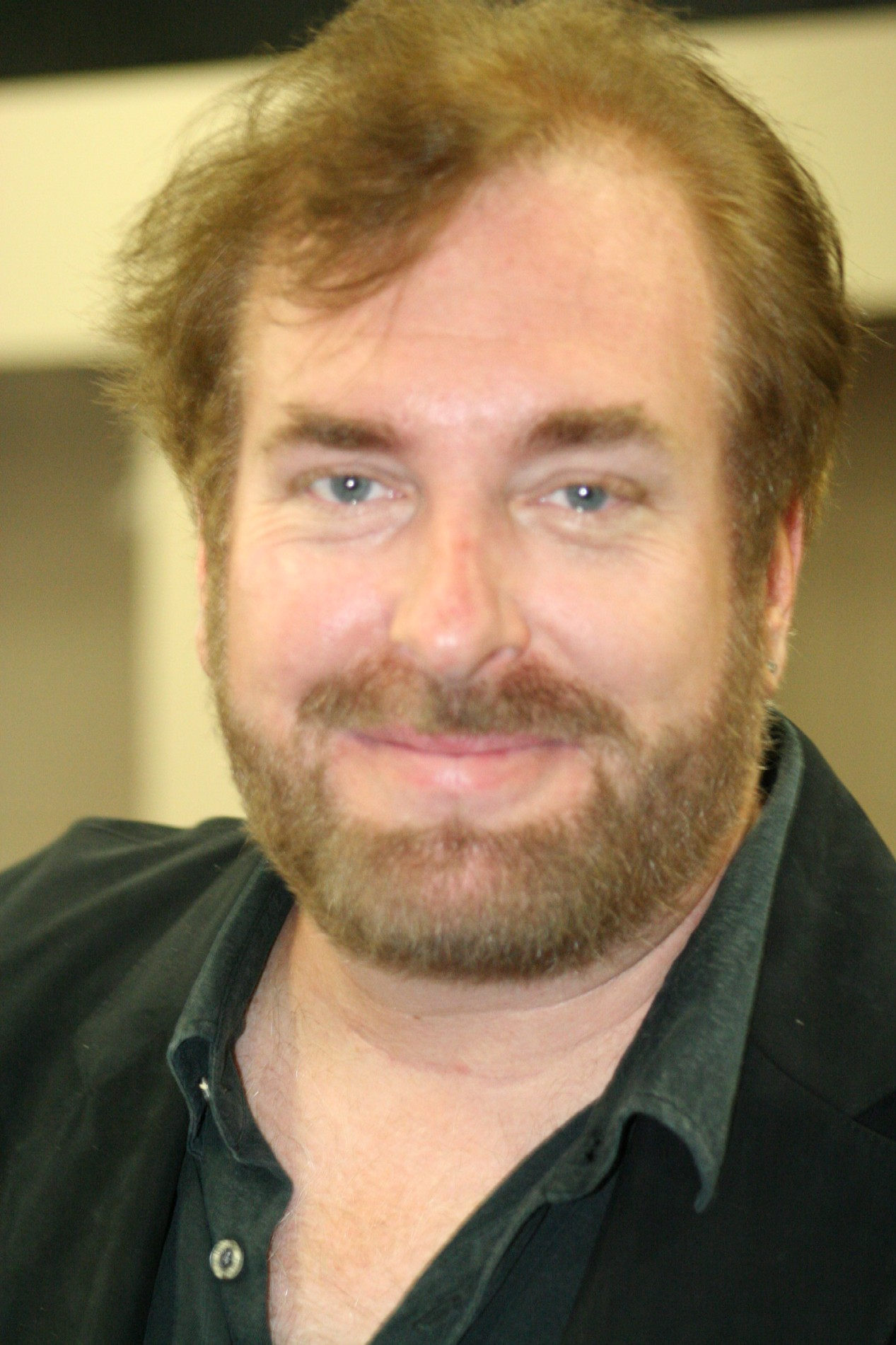
- David Fury in 2007
- Born: New York City, New York, United States
- Occupations: Writer, producer
- Spouse: Elin Hampton (m. 1993)
- Writing career
- Notable awards: Primetime Emmy Award for Outstanding Drama Series; 2006 24; Primetime Emmy Award for Outstanding Drama Series; 2005 Lost; Writers Guild of America Award; 2006 Lost

David Fury is an American television writer, producer, actor and director.

== Career ==
He is well known for his work on Buffy the Vampire Slayer, Angel, Lost, 24, Fringe, Tyrant and The Tick.

Fury was a co-executive producer and writer for the first season of Lost. He was nominated for a Best Writing Emmy for his episode "Walkabout." He and the writing staff won the Writers Guild of America (WGA) Award for Best Dramatic Series at the February 2006 ceremony for their work on the first season.

Fury was born in New York City, the son of a model and a textile salesman. He was a stand-up comic at The Improv, Comedy Cellar, Comedy U and Catch a Rising Star, and founded the comedy theater troupe "Brain Trust" at the Manhattan Punch Line Theater. He also wrote for The Jackie Thomas Show, House of Buggin', Dream On and Pinky and the Brain.

In 2008, Fury cameoed alongside Marti Noxon as a singing newsreader in Joss Whedon's short film Dr. Horrible's Sing-Along Blog. In 2009 he cameoed in the seventh season of 24 as Arthur Carr.

He was also the (uncredited) voice of 'Jock' in Raiders of the Lost Ark.

Fury is married to fellow screenwriter and playwright Elin Hampton (producer of Mad About You), and has three children.

=== Buffy the Vampire Slayer ===
Fury first freelanced episodes throughout seasons two and three of Buffy before joining the writing staff in season four as a producer. He was promoted to a supervising producer in season five and to a co-executive producer in season six. He is the only writer besides creator Joss Whedon to write a Buffy season finale episode.

- 2x20 "Go Fish" (co-writer; with Elin Hampton)
- 3x12 "Helpless" (writer)
- 3x19 "Choices" (writer)
- 4x04 "Fear, Itself" (writer)
- 4x11 "Doomed" (co-writer; with Marti Noxon and Jane Espenson)
- 4x13 "The I in Team" (writer)
- 4x21 "Primeval" (writer)
- 5x02 "Real Me" (writer)
- 5x08 "Shadow" (writer)
- 5x14 "Crush" (writer)
- 6x02 "Bargaining (Part 2)" (writer)
- 6x05 "Life Serial" (co-writer; with Jane Espenson)
- 6x11 "Gone" (writer and director)
- 6x22 "Grave" (writer)
- 7x08 "Sleeper" (co-writer; with Jane Espenson)
- 7x11 "Showtime" (writer)
- 7x17 "Lies My Parents Told Me" (co-writer and director; with Drew Goddard)

=== Angel ===
Fury freelanced episodes throughout the first three seasons of Angel, then took over Marti Noxon's role as consulting producer on the show beginning with season four. After Buffy concluded, he was promoted to co-executive producer for the final season of Angel, and then to full executive producer midseason. He appears as an actor in the fifth-season episode "Smile Time", portraying the producer of a children's television program. At Tim Minear's request, he also makes an appearance in season two episode Reprise.

- 1x02 "Lonely Hearts" (writer)
  - "Corrupt" (original second episode)
- 1x10 "Parting Gifts" (co-writer; with Jeannine Renshaw)
- 2x17 "Disharmony" (writer)
- 3x19 "The Price" (writer)
- 4x03 "The House Always Wins" (writer)
- 4x10 "Awakening" (co-writer; with Steven S. DeKnight)
- 4x13 "Salvage" (writer)
- 4x21 "Peace Out" (writer)
- 5x02 "Just Rewards" (teleplay and story; story with Ben Edlund)
- 5x08 "Destiny" (co-writer; with Steven S. DeKnight)
- 5x12 "You're Welcome" (writer and director)
- 5x21 "Power Play" (writer)

=== Lost ===
Fury served as a co-executive producer for the first season of Lost. Significantly, Fury wrote the first flashback episodes for many of the important characters including Locke, Sayid, Hurley, and Michael. His episodes also introduced such important series phenomena as the numbers and the whispers, and the episode "Walkabout" was the first time that any of the survivors saw the monster.

- 1x04 "Walkabout" (writer)
- 1x09 "Solitary" (writer)
- 1x14 "Special" (writer)
- 1x18 "Numbers" (co-writer; with Brent Fletcher)

=== 24 ===
Fury was hired to co-executive produce the fifth and sixth seasons of 24, and moved up to executive producer during the show's seventh season, a title he also held during the series' final season. He also wrote for 24: Live Another Day.

- 5x06 "Day 5: 12:00 p.m. – 1:00 p.m." (writer)
- 5x09 "Day 5: 3:00 p.m. – 4:00 p.m." (co-writer; with Howard Gordon)
- 5x17 "Day 5: 11:00 p.m. – 12:00 a.m." (writer)
- 5x22 "Day 5: 4:00 a.m. – 5:00 a.m." (co-writer; with Sam Montgomery)
- 6x03 "Day 6: 8:00 a.m. – 9:00 a.m." (co-writer; with Evan Katz)
- 6x08 "Day 6: 1:00 p.m. – 2:00 p.m." (co-writer; with Evan Katz)
- 6x12 "Day 6: 5:00 p.m. – 6:00 p.m." (teleplay; with Evan Katz)
- 6x14 "Day 6: 7:00 p.m. – 8:00 p.m." (story; with Manny Coto)
- 6x17 "Day 6: 10:00 p.m. – 11:00 p.m." (writer)
- 6x24 "Day 6: 5:00 a.m. – 6:00 a.m." (co-writer; with Robert Cochran & Manny Coto)
- 7x04 "Day 7: 11:00 a.m. – 12:00 p.m." (co-writer; with Alex Gansa)
- 7x08 "Day 7: 3:00 p.m. – 4:00 p.m." (story)
- 7x09 "Day 7: 4:00 p.m. – 5:00 p.m." (writer)
- 7x15 "Day 7: 10:00 p.m. – 11:00 p.m." (story)
- 7x19 "Day 7: 2:00 a.m. – 3:00 a.m." (writer)
- 7x23 "Day 7: 6:00 a.m. – 7:00 a.m." (co-writer; with Alex Gansa)
- 8x03 "Day 8: 6:00 p.m. – 7:00 p.m." (co-writer; with Alex Gansa)
- 8x08 "Day 8: 11:00 p.m. – 12:00 a.m." (writer)
- 8x11 "Day 8: 2:00 a.m. – 3:00 a.m." (co-writer; with Evan Katz)
- 8x17 "Day 8: 8:00 a.m. – 9:00 a.m." (writer)
- 8x22 "Day 8: 1:00 p.m. – 2:00 p.m." (writer)
- 9x02 "Day 9: 12:00 p.m. – 1:00 p.m." (co-writer; with Robert Cochran)
- 9x06 "Day 9: 4:00 p.m. – 5:00 p.m." (writer)
- 9x11 "Day 9: 9:00 p.m. – 10:00 p.m." (co-writer; with Robert Cochran)

=== Terra Nova ===
Brannon Braga brought Fury on board as a co-executive producer for the 2011 series Terra Nova. Fury left the show during pre-production in September 2010 due to creative differences.

=== Fringe ===
Fury joined the FOX science-fiction/horror series Fringe for its fourth season as a writer and co-executive producer. Episodes he contributed to include:

- 4x03 "Alone in the World"
- 4x08 "Back to Where You've Never Been" (co-written by co-producer Graham Roland)
- 4x14 "The End of All Things"
- 4x17 "Everything in Its Right Place" (Fury and consulting producer J.R. Orci co-wrote a teleplay based on a story by Orci and story editor Matthew Pitts)
- 5x02 "In Absentia" (co-written by executive producer J.H. Wyman)
- 5x06 "Through the Looking Glass and What Walter Found There"
- 5x10 "Anomaly XB-6783746"

=== Hannibal ===
- 1x03 "Potage" (co-written by Chris Brancato and Bryan Fuller)

=== Homeland ===
- 5x11 "Our Man in Damascus" (writer)

=== The Tick (2016 series) ===
Fury came on to Amazon's reboot as executive producer and co-showrunner with creator Ben Edlund for the 12-episode first season.

- 1x02 "Secret/Identity" (writer)
- 1x06 "Tale From the Crypt" (writer)
- 1x11 "The End of the Beginning of the Start of the Dawn of the Age of Superheroes" (co-writer; with Ben Edlund)

=== 9-1-1 ===
- 3x03 "The Searchers" (writer)
- 3x04 "Triggers" (writer)

== See also ==
- Mutant Enemy Productions
