= Harmony Kendall =

Character in Buffy the Vampire Slayer and Angel

- Buffy the Vampire Slayer / Angel character
- Mercedes McNab as Harmony Kendall
- First appearance: "The Harvest" (1997)
- Last appearance: Future Shock (2018)
- Created by: Joss Whedon
- Portrayed by: Mercedes McNab

In-universe information
- Affiliation: Wolfram & Hart
- Classification: Vampire
- Notable powers: Superhuman strength, speed, stamina, agility, and reflexes Acute sensory perception, rapid healing and immortality

Harmony Kendall is a fictional character created by Joss Whedon for the television series Buffy the Vampire Slayer and its spin-off Angel. The character is portrayed by Mercedes McNab. Originally cast as a minor character, McNab's credited status elevated to guest star and ultimately series regular over the course of her tenure in Buffy and Angel.

== Appearances ==
=== Television ===
Harmony appeared in the unaired pilot as a member of Cordelia Chase's clique, the "Cordettes." She subsequently appears in the second episode of season 1, "The Harvest," and makes appearances throughout the first three seasons, and then a larger role in another two. When Cordelia begins dating Xander Harris, Harmony shuns her from their clique and usurps her position as leader of the group. After Cordelia and Xander's breakup, Harmony cruelly tricks Cordelia into thinking she has been re-admitted into the clique, only to humiliate and reject her. However, when Xander has Amy Madison cast a love spell in "Bewitched, Bothered and Bewildered," Harmony is one of the many women who becomes temporarily infatuated with him, then falls silent when Cordelia rebukes her and returns to dating Xander. (Note: Essayist Theresa Basile remarks that Cordelia "needs to continue to impress Harmony and the others, who don't think she should be dating Xander. What kind of guys are Harmony attracted to? Well... 'HARMONY: Cody Weinberg called me at home last night. CORDELIA: Cody Weinberg? The one with the 350SL? HARMONY: The very one. Said he's thinking of asking me to the pledge dance on Thursday. CORDELIA: That's so huge! HARMONY: Yeah, there's just two other girls he's gonna ask first, and if they refuse, then I'll...' Harmony thinks Cordelia is pathetic for dating a 'loser' like Xander, yet she's the one excited to be the third choice of a rich douchebag who treats her badly. I wonder if, deep down, Harmony is jealous of Cordelia's ability to shrug off societal expectations and date a boy she actually cares about, and teased her about Xander because she didn't want to see someone else happy.")

In the episode "The Wish," a vengeance demon grants Cordelia's wish that Buffy had never arrived in Sunnydale. Harmony appears in the alternate, hellish reality, again a follower of Cordelia's "Cordettes."

In the final showdown with Mayor Wilkins during his Ascension in the episode "Graduation Day," Harmony (as part of an attempt by Buffy to help organize a student resistance) is killed/sired by a vampire. She reappears in the episode "The Harsh Light of Day" as a vampire, having retained her characteristic pettiness, susceptibility to stronger-willed people, and an affection for unicorn figurines. Harmony begins a sexual relationship with Spike, her "blondie bear." Neither Spike nor Harmony are satisfied with their relationship; Spike is frustrated by Harmony's ignorance and clinginess while she is exasperated with his endless broken promises and repeated attempts to kill Buffy. They separate, although she agrees to rekindle their relationship after Spike escapes from the Initiative. Harmony quickly regrets this decision after recognizing Spike's renewed campaign against the Slayer, and even chases him out of her lair with a stake when he desperately seeks her help in the episode "Pangs."

Spike's ambition to kill the Slayer apparently rubs off. After separating from Spike, Harmony wants to be an independent, strong vampire who can get by on her own; accordingly, in the episode "Real Me", she gathers her own gang and makes her own attempt to kill Buffy, which ends in disaster. Her minions destroyed, Harmony returns to Spike for protection until it becomes clear that Spike's infatuation with Buffy has become an obsession (cf. "Crush").

Having departed Sunnydale, Harmony is next seen in the Buffy spin-off Angel, in the episode "Disharmony". She visits her old friend Cordelia in Los Angeles, not telling Cordelia she has become a vampire. Harmony tries to connect with Cordelia, but has difficulty controlling her demon side. She enters Cordelia's bedroom at night, driven by bloodlust, but apologizes for her actions and intentions when Cordelia wakes up. Cordelia misunderstands her explanation, believing her to be a lesbian until the matter is cleared up by Willow in a phone call. Despite this, Cordelia insists on giving Harmony a chance, while the rest of the team grows increasingly frustrated with her habits such as popping gum or tearing pages out of old, irreplaceable books. She accompanies the Angel Investigations team on a mission to investigate a new vampire cult, but soon betrays them to their enemies. Cordelia nearly kills Harmony, but, out of some respect for the friendship they once shared and realizing that Harmony is struggling to find her own purpose in life, allows her to leave.

Over two years later, Harmony tries to make a life for herself in L.A. She gains employment at the L.A. branch of Wolfram & Hart, as a member of the secretarial pool. Harmony is attracted by the building's necro-tempered glass windows (designed to protect vampires from sunlight which would otherwise cause them to burst into flames), as well as the firm's non-judgmental workplace culture and dental plan. A few weeks into her employment with the firm, Wesley Wyndam-Pryce hires her out of the blue to be Angel's new personal secretary, after Angel and his staff are given control of that branch of Wolfram & Hart; Wesley apparently thought a familiar face would be good for Angel. Angel reluctantly agrees, on the strict condition that Harmony continues to refrain from drinking human blood.

Harmony is reunited with Spike when he returns, first as a ghost and then in corporeal form. She tries to connect with him, and initially hopes to renew their relationship now that he has a soul. Spike shows no interest for Harmony until he regains his corporeal form and proceeds to seduce her into a brief, disastrous fling, after which neither of them puts any effort into rekindling their tumultuous relationship.

At this point in her un-life, Harmony feels isolated and alone. She knows that she is incompetent as an evil vampire, but her struggle to lead a more normal life is hindered because she lacks a soul. Angel often treats her with distrust and barely masked hostility, and her input, ideas, and presence are generally ignored by his team. Harmony also experiences an inability to connect with her co-workers, who resent her quick rise to the position of the CEO's secretary. In the episode "Harm's Way", she is framed for murder by Tamika, another vampire secretary who wants her job; Tamika also substitutes human blood for her supply of otter blood, to make it appear as though Harmony drank from the victim. She clears her name and ironically saves a demon summit by staking her scheming rival on a conference table with a pair of chopsticks, since the demons required a W&H employee's death to seal their deal. Despite her incompetence, Harmony manages to prove a 'sort of' asset to the team, "torturing" Eve (i.e. hitting Eve in the face a few times) to get information, helping Wesley search for information about Knox's plans, and aiding Lorne in protecting Eve from her replacement as their liaison to the Senior Partners. She strikes up a brief friendship with Fred Burkle, though her relationship with Illyria, the demon who later inhabits Fred's body, is quite frosty.

Harmony becomes a member of the regular cast starting with the episode "Underneath". In the series finale, "Not Fade Away", she betrays Angel, revealing his plans to go after Archduke Sebassis to Marcus Hamilton, the Senior Partners' new liaison, with whom she has a sexual relationship. Angel, however, always expected her to betray him at some point, so he had only confided information he wanted her to reveal. After her betrayal (which Angel blames on her lack of a soul, and she blames on his lack of confidence in her), he fires her, but not before providing her with a letter of recommendation (which he had already written and signed, in anticipation of her disloyalty). As Angel and Hamilton prepare to fight each other, she runs off, wishing them both luck: "May the best man win!"

=== Literature ===
According to the Sunnydale High Yearbook tie-in book, Harmony is a member of the field hockey team, Dance Club, and Drama Club in addition to cheerleading, writes a brief fashion article about the Homecoming Dance dresses, and is voted "Biggest Attitude" by her peers.

In the canonical continuation of Buffy, Season Eight, Harmony features in the twenty-first issue, "Harmonic Divergence" by Jane Espenson, which begins a story-arc about the public revelation of the existence of vampires and Slayers. Harmony becomes a MTV reality television star in her own TV series, Harmony Bites, which also stars Clem. Harmony came to instant notoriety after she killed a Slayer who attacked her on live camera. Thanks to Harmony, Buffy and her Slayer army were publicly outed by Anderson Cooper on CNN's Anderson Cooper 360° later that day. Dark Horse Comics created a MySpace page for Harmony, and the Myspace Dark Horse Presents features a special comic book 'episode' of Harmony Bites written by Jane Espenson. Harmony is now considered a vampire rights spokeswoman. At the end of the twenty-second issue, "Swell", she is seen being interviewed on TV about the destruction of the Vampy Cat toy line by the Slayers, which she blames on their blind hatred of anything vampire-related (in actuality, the toys were possessed demonic creatures). This, in combination with the criminal activities of rogue Slayer Simone Doffler, the destruction of Sunnydale and the machinations of the villain Twilight has forced the Slayers into retreat as the whole world now views them as terrorists.

Harmony appears twice in Angel & Faith. During "In Perfect Harmony" it is revealed she used her fame to create rules that when vampires feed from humans they can never kill nor sire and must bite only after the human gives permission. The vast majority of vampires follow these rules for the easy food. Harmony is being threatened with a sex tape that shows her siring a man who was dying of cancer. Angel & Faith reluctantly agree to help her find the blackmailer so vampires continue following her rules and do not start killing humans again. Harmony's staff create a plan to restore Angel's image after his actions as Twilight have left him hated by both humans and demons. The blackmailer is revealed to be Clem who has fallen in love with Harmony and wanted to be her hero by stopping the blackmailer. Harmony won't date him but is easily willing to forget people's past actions, and tells Angel He should do the same with his overwhelming guilt over his centuries of killing humans. In turn, Angel tells Faith that famous people are crazy, and instantly throws the image plan into the trash.

In "Spike & Faith" Angel gives Spike Harmony's phone number when Spike is trying to get over his depression about his relationship with Buffy. Spike and Harmony have loud sexual activities in Faith's home; much to Angel & Faith's discomfort.

Harmony returns in the tenth issue of Buffy season 10 in an issue titled "Day Off (Harmony In My Head)." The Scoobies have taken up residence in San Francisco, and are tasked with writing the rules of the new magic in the world by using the pages of Buffy's Vampyr book. They invite several species from the mystical world as lobbyists to consider when creating the rules. Buffy is annoyed when Harmony shows up representing the older type vampires, but is happy to see Clem is with her. Buffy is also displeased that the new breed of vampires have selected a vampire named Vicki as their representative, because Vicki previously attempted to kill her.

The new breed of vampire is immune to sunlight and can shape-shift. Harmony creates a compromise; the new breed will follow her rules for peaceful interaction with humans, and the Scoobies can create a rule so the new breed will be unable to shape-shift in the daylight. Harmony then visits Spike who apologizes for using her in London, but she doesn't care. She feels that she used him in payback for the way he dumped her in Sunnydale. Harmony then knocks Spike unconscious. Harmony then tries to have Clem write in the new rule book which would make her beloved by the whole world, and for Buffy, Spike, and Angel to finally make peace with each other. Lastly, she wants the book to make Buffy's love triangle to agree to a marriage polygamous marriage amongst the three. Clem does not do this, as the book may hurt Harmony due to its wish fulfillments often being twisted like a Monkey's paw. Spike takes back the book from Harmony and Clem, then kicks them both out.

However, Clem wrote one thing in the book for Harmony; unicorns are now real.

Harmony appears next in the twenty-first issue, "In Pieces on the Ground, Part I." Demon invasions have become a global problem, the Scooby Gang is reluctantly working with the human military to battle this problem, but they also need the strength and numbers of both breeds of vampires. With Harmony leading the old breed and Vicki the new, they have Buffy and Spike compete in trials of combat to win the vampires' allegiance. While the other one fights, Harmony taunts Spike and Vicki taunts Buffy about the relationship insecurities they each have. With the vampires' loyalty won, Buffy and Spike leave rattled, while Harmony and Vicki congratulate each other for their accomplishment.

== Powers and abilities ==
Harmony has the standard powers and vulnerabilities of a vampire. Several episodes make comedy of her subpar fighting skills, though after later training she holds her own against Riley and Spike, and in "Harm's Way" she kills another vampire after a long battle. In "Harmonic Divergence", she kills a Slayer, though partially by accident. In the Harmony Bites e-comic, she easily kills Justin, a vampire she sired, by quickly deflecting his attempt at staking her.

In "Conviction", she claimed to "type like a superhero, if there was a superhero whose power was typing."

== Appearances ==
Harmony has 48 canonical appearances in the Buffyverse.

=== Television ===
Mercedes McNab guest starred as Harmony in 33 episodes of television. She was promoted to series regular in the Angel episode Underneath.

Buffy the Vampire Slayer

- Season 1 (1997): The Harvest, Out of Mind, Out of Sight
- Season 2 (1998): Bewitched, Bothered and Bewildered
- Season 3 (1998–99): The Wish, Graduation Day, Part 1 & 2
- Season 4 (1999-2000): The Harsh Light of Day, The Initiative, Pangs, Restless
- Season 5 (2000–01): Real Me, Out of My Mind, Family, Fool for Love, Crush

Angel

- Season 2 (2001): Disharmony
- Season 5 (2003–04): Conviction, Just Rewards, Life of the Party, Destiny, Harm's Way, Soul Purpose, Damage, You're Welcome, Smile Time, Shells, Underneath, Origin, Time Bomb, The Girl in Question, Power Play, Not Fade Away

=== Comics ===
Harmony appeared in 15 canonical issues of comics.

Buffy the Vampire Slayer

- Season 8 (2008–10): After These Messages... We'll Be Right Back!, Harmonic Divergence, Swell, HARM, Harmony Bites, Harmony Comes to the Nation, Carpe Noctem, Part 1
- Season 10 (2014–16): Day Off (or Harmony in My Head), Relationship Status: Complicated, Part 1, In Pieces on the Ground, Part 1, Where Are They Now?
- Season 11 (2017): One Girl in All the World
- Season 12 (2018): Future Shock

Angel

- Angel & Faith (2011, 2013): In Perfect Harmony, Spike and Faith

== Bibliography ==
- Abbott, Stacey. Reading Angel: The TV Spin-off With a Soul. I.B.Tauris, 2005. p. xvii. ISBN 1-85043-839-0
- Topping, Keith. The Complete Slayer: An Unofficial and Unauthorized Guide to Every Episode of Buffy the Vampire Slayer. Virgin Books, 2004. ISBN 0-7535-0931-8
- Tracy, Kathleen. The Girl's Got Bite: The Original Unauthorized Guide to Buffy's World. St. Martin's Press, 2003. pp. 33–34. ISBN 0-312-31258-X
