= Sunnydale High Yearbook =

Book by Christopher Golden and Nancy Holder

Buffy the Vampire Slayer: The Sunnydale High Yearbook
- Author: Christopher Golden & Nancy Holder
- Language: English
- Series: Buffy the Vampire Slayer
- Genre: Horror novel
- Publisher: Pocket Books
- Publication date: October 4, 1999
- Publication place: United States
- Media type: Print (Hardback & Paperback)
- Pages: 112 pp (incl. 32 full-colour)
- ISBN: 0-671-03541-X
- OCLC: 42767229
- Preceded by: "Graduation Day, Part Two"
- Followed by: Double Cross (Buffy comic)

Buffy the Vampire Slayer: The Sunnydale High Yearbook is a 1999 tie-in book based on the United States television series Buffy the Vampire Slayer. In the series, the closing shot of the 1999 episode "Graduation Day, Part Two" shows the fictional yearbook this tie-in was modeled after.

== Plot summary ==
The Scooby Gang are coming to the end of their Senior year at High School, Buffy Summers is busy making battle plans. Willow has time to pick up the High School Yearbook for her. Once the gang could relax knowing that high school truly was over, Xander, Oz, Cordelia, Giles, Angel and others scrawled notes in Buffy's yearbook to make it special. It is now full of notes, photos and in-jokes only the Scoobies understand and appreciate, having fought on the Hellmouth for three years and survived High School.

This book was an oddity in the release of Buffy publications by Pocket Books, it was neither a novelization of an episode, nor an original novel, but instead a fictional school yearbook. It featured "inscriptions" from characters on the front inside cover; Willow, Xander, Oz, Giles, Cordelia, Angel, Anya, Wesley, Snyder, Joyce, Jonathan, Harmony, Larry, and Devon. It also included inscriptions from the crew-folk on the back inside cover. In the "In Memoriam" section Willow mentions Harmony's absence but she doesn't know Harmony is dead until "The Harsh Light of Day".

== Publication ==
Written by Christopher Golden and Nancy Holder, the book was published in 1999 by Simon & Schuster. It is a young adult book. The scholar Stephanie A. Graves cited the book as an example of transmediality in demonstrating the television show Buffy the Vampire Slayer's continuation outside of the screen.

== Reception ==
Kristen Baldwin of Entertainment Weekly gave The Sunnydale High Yearbook a C−, stating it "scrapes the bottom of the trivia sarcophagus" and is "about as informative as a rerun—and not nearly as entertaining". The Sacramento Bee journalist Rick Kushman recommended the book as a gift, writing that it would "make you look smart, funny and cool" and is "one of the best TV tie-in gifts in years".
