= Lineage (Angel) =

- Angel episode
- Episode no.: Season 5 Episode 7
- Directed by: Jefferson Kibbee
- Written by: Drew Goddard
- Production code: 5ADH07
- Original air date: November 12, 2003

Guest appearances
- Sarah Thompson as Eve; Jonathan M. Woodward as Knox; Treva Etienne as Emil; Roy Dotrice as Roger Wyndam-Pryce

Episode chronology
← Previous "The Cautionary Tale of Numero Cinco"	Next → "Destiny"
- Angel season 5

"Lineage" is the seventh episode of the fifth season of the American television series Angel.

== Plot ==
Wesley meets with a man named Emil in a warehouse and is displeased to be talking to a middleman when he had expected to meet with the distributor. Fred appears with a highly specialized rifle that has been custom-made by Wolfram & Hart and details the specs for Emil. Wesley notes that the whole shipment of guns is ready for delivery but refuses to do business until he meets the distributor. Emil starts to give him the name of the distributor when the three are attacked. Wesley, leaving Fred unarmed, shoots and kills Emil's bodyguards. As the fight intensifies, Angel arrives and kills Wesley's assailant with a chain. He gets a jolt of electricity, and when he pulls off the guy's mask, he sees a metal plate instead of a face. Wesley realizes that Fred has been injured in the attack, and Angel is angry at Wesley for putting her in danger.

Back at Wolfram and Hart, Angel blasts Wesley as Eve tries to calm him down. Wesley argues that he needed Fred there to explain the weaponry to Emil; he chose her because she wouldn't make Emil suspicious, and she would be able to explain the weapon convincingly. Angel calls this a “reckless decision” and says that Wesley has to clear things like this with him. Eve wonders if Angel is really still mad at Wesley for taking Connor. Angel argues that Wesley was trying to do the right thing. “Are you worried about the next time Wesley betrays you trying to do ‘the right thing’?” Eve asks.

With her arm in a sling, Fred reunites with Wesley, explaining that she had been injured by a grappling hook. She tells him that they’re taking the cyborg apart to learn more about it. Wesley apologizes for getting her hurt, but she blames herself. He says that he should have protected her, and she blasts him for being condescending. “Stop trying to be valiant,” she tells him. “You’re coming off like a self-pitying child.” Wesley greets his father; she thinks he's being sarcastic, but his father, Roger Wyndam-Pryce, is actually there. Fred meets him, then rushes off, embarrassed at her outburst. Roger tells Wesley that they have to discuss some business - now that the Watchers Council has been destroyed, the other former Watchers, including Roger, want to reform the Council. Roger has come to assess whether Wesley should be invited back. When Wesley says he's not interested, Roger replies that he has the chance to clear the Wyndam-Pryce name. Lorne passes by, discussing movie business, and meets Roger, who's sarcastic about the effect that an entertainment division will have on fighting evil. Gunn arrives to tell Wesley that the lab wants him to look at the cyborg from the previous night. Wesley reluctantly invites Roger to tag along.

In the lab, Fred tells Angel that the body housing the cyborg may have once been human. As they discuss the blending of man and machine, Spike is interested, noting that sex with robots is more common than people think. Fred wants to access the cyborg's memory base so that they can trace its previous actions and possibly discover its purpose. Wesley introduces his father, who notes that he and Spike had met in Vienna in 1963 as Spike was slaughtering an orphanage. Fred asks Wesley to decipher some symbols found on the cyborg, and Roger reveals that Wesley had been Head Boy back at the Academy (noting, however, that the pickings were a bit slim that year), and Spike is delighted at the revelation. As Wesley begins to work, he accidentally activates a bomb. Wesley orders Fred to get as far away from the building as possible, announcing that he'll try to defuse the bomb. Suddenly, the bomb stops, thanks to Roger, who had more accurately translated the symbols. Angel wants to know what happened, and Spike gleefully reports that Wesley had been Head Boy at the Academy. Fred and Wesley explain the situation to Angel and tell him that Roger defused the bomb. Angel recognizes that Wesley is rattled by Roger's presence and notes how difficult father-son relationships can be. They discuss a report of assassins which might also be cyborgs; Wesley finds it interesting that the robots are fighting evil beings, possibly indicating that they are good guys. Later, after Roger tells Fred stories from Wesley's childhood, Wesley asks for his father's assistance with the cyborg threat.

Roger asks about Wesley's feelings for Fred, but he doesn't want to chat about his love life. He mentions that his last girlfriend was murdered and he had to chop her up, at which point his father gives up on the conversation. Wesley shows Roger the special Wolfram & Hart reference books, which Roger thinks are dangerous and could attract evil thieves. Up on the roof, a bunch of cyborgs drop out of a helicopter. Eve gets into an elevator and is joined by Spike, who has noticed her watching him. He thinks that there's more to her than she's letting on, and she accuses him of the same. Spike wonders why Wolfram & Hart is keeping him connected to the amulet that brought him back, since it was intended for Angel. Eve replies that he can't assume it was intended for Angel. The lights go out, and Spike yells that Pavayne will never take him to hell. Gunn tells Angel that they may have lost contact with security. The cyborgs infiltrate and start fighting. A cyborg heads to Wesley's office, where Wesley keeps his father from fighting it. Roger notes that the cyborg went straight for the books. They gather the books and head through a secret vault, where Roger allows that Wesley handled the cyborg well. He then knocks Wesley out, steals a wand from one of the vaults, and speaks into a communications device: “Phase one complete. Begin phase two.”

Angel, Gunn, and others fight cyborgs in the lobby as Wesley regains consciousness in the secret vault. Back in his lobby, he sees that the cyborg he fought earlier is still alive. Fred runs into Roger, who says that Wesley went to the roof to investigate something and asked him to tell Angel. Fred offers to take him to Angel. In his office, Wesley tortures the cyborg for information, demanding to know what Roger is up to. In the lobby, Angel and Gunn keep fighting and are joined by Spike, who concentrates long enough to hit the cyborg attacking Gunn. Roger and Fred arrive and tell Angel to meet Wesley on the roof; Angel and Roger head up. Once they arrive, Angel realizes that Wesley isn't there. Roger points the wand that he took from Wesley's vaults at Angel, drawing white smoke from Angel's body. Wesley arrives and holds a gun on Roger, concluding that his father is removing Angel's free will so that Angel will be his slave. He accuses Roger of ordering the cyborg attack in order to smuggle in a weapon. Fred comes up to the roof as Roger blasts Wesley for working for Angel when he knows who he is. Wesley taunts his father, insinuating that Roger fears Wesley is better than he is. As a helicopter arrives to extract Roger, he demands the wand, informing Wesley that he will kill him for it. Wesley threatens to drop the wand, which will break it and return Angel's will to him. Roger tries to threaten Fred's life by pointing his gun at her, but Wesley shoots Roger without hesitation. Wesley is sickened by what has just happened and even more shocked when Roger's body is racked with electrical charges, revealing him to be a cyborg.

Later that night, Wesley and Angel discuss the cyborgs and wonder why they were after Angel. Wesley says that they must have crossed someone when they took over Wolfram & Hart. Angel says that others see them as weak, but Wesley corrects him, noting that they see Wesley as weak, which is why they targeted him. Angel says that Wesley isn't weak - he does what he has to protect people and do what he knows is right. Wesley is disturbed that the Roger cyborg knew him so well. Angel points out that it had access to the Watchers Council files, which would have provided plenty of information. He tries to connect with Wesley by reminding him that when he became a vampire, he really did kill his father. Wesley says this is a little different. On his way out of Angel's office, Wesley passes Spike, who says that when he first became a vampire, he killed his mother. Wesley, exhausted, wants no more details. He goes to his office, and Fred stops by. Wesley asks her to please not tell him about how she killed her parents. She reminds him that it's not like he really killed his father - part of him must have known that it wasn't really him. Wesley says that he had been positive that it was his father. Fred notes that Wesley did what he had to do when 'Roger' was threatening Wesley's friends. Wesley tells her that 'Roger' had been threatening her. He tells her that his father pointed a gun at her so he shot him. Fred and Wesley stare at each other until Knox interrupts, offering to take Fred home. Wesley tells her to go. Once he's alone, he calls his parents in England to see how they are. His relationship with his father is unchanged.

== Reception ==
The Futon Critic named it the 32nd best episode of 2003, saying "It's in this hour we see once again how far Wesley has come and how much he has changed over the years. More importantly, it finally moved along the plotline of Wes' secret feelings for Fred (Amy Acker) as he literally kills his father for her."
