= Drew Goddard =

American screenwriter and director (born 1975)

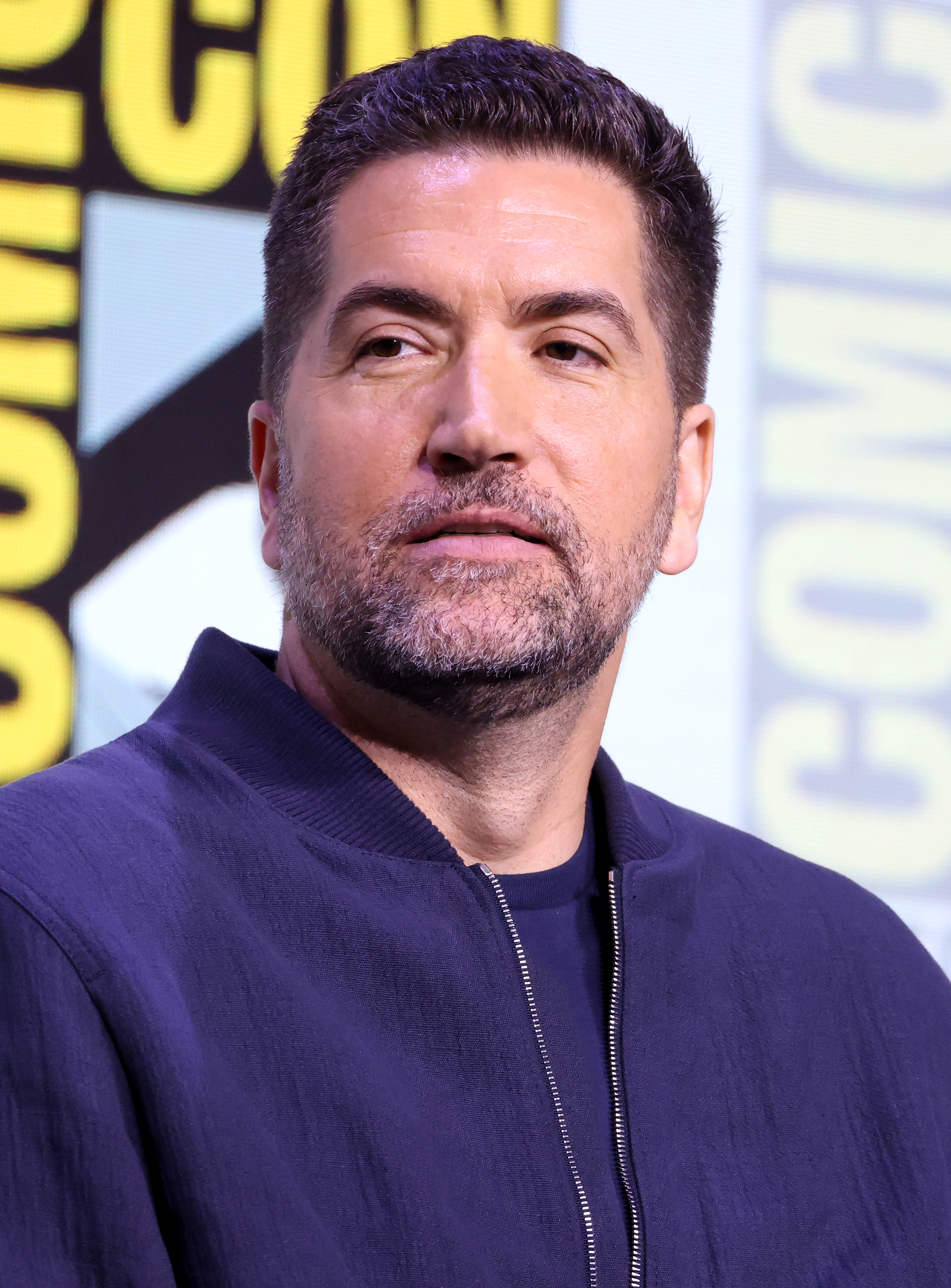
- Goddard in 2025
- Born: Andrew Brion Hogan Goddard; February 26, 1975 (age 51); Houston, Texas, U.S.
- Occupations: Screenwriter; film director; producer
- Spouse: Caroline Goddard
- Children: 2
- Writing career
- Years active: 2002–present

Andrew Brion Hogan Goddard (born February 26, 1975) is an American filmmaker most closely associated with the horror genre. He began his career writing episodes for the television shows Buffy the Vampire Slayer, Angel, Alias, and Lost. After moving into screenwriting in film, he wrote Cloverfield (2008), World War Z (2013), and two Andy Weir adaptations The Martian (2015) and Project Hail Mary (2026). For The Martian, he was nominated for the Academy Award for Best Adapted Screenplay. He also directed The Cabin in the Woods (2011) and Bad Times at the El Royale (2018).

Goddard created the Netflix series Daredevil (2015–2018), a part of Marvel Cinematic Universe. He went on to direct several episodes of The Good Place and served as an executive producer for 10 Cloverfield Lane (2016) and The Cloverfield Paradox (2018), installments in the Cloverfield franchise.

== Early life and education ==
Goddard was born in Houston, Texas, on February 26, 1975, to mother Colleen Mary Hogan and father Laurence Woodbury Goddard, both educators, and raised in Los Alamos, New Mexico. He attended Los Alamos High School and then University of Colorado Boulder from which he earned, in 1997, a degree in English literature.

== Career ==
=== 2000s ===
Goddard started his career as a staff writer for Buffy the Vampire Slayer and Angel, receiving a Hugo Award for Best Dramatic Presentation for the former. In 2005, he joined J. J. Abrams' Bad Robot team, where he wrote for both Alias and Lost, winning—along with the Lost writing staff—the Writers Guild of America (WGA) Award for Best Dramatic Series. In 2006, during its third season, Goddard became the co-executive producer of Lost.

By February 2007, Goddard wrote his first feature, Cloverfield, directed by Matt Reeves and produced by J. J. Abrams. Cloverfield made $168 million on a $25 million budget. Empire named it the fifth best film of 2008, and the film then went on to win the year's Saturn Award for Best Science Fiction Film.

=== 2010s ===
Goddard's directorial debut, The Cabin in the Woods, was co-written with Joss Whedon. The Cabin in the Woods was featured on Metacritic's best films of 2012 list, in addition to earning a 92% approval rating on Rotten Tomatoes. The film went on to win the year's Saturn Award for Best Horror or Thriller Film, as well as garnering Goddard Saturn's "Filmmaker Showcase Award".

In 2012, Goddard—in addition to J. Michael Straczynski, Matthew Michael Carnahan and Lost showrunner Damon Lindelof—rewrote the third act of the screenplay ahead of reshoots for the film World War Z starring Brad Pitt and directed by Marc Forster. The film grossed $540 million on a $190 million budget. As a result, in June 2013, Paramount announced that it was moving ahead with a sequel, though it was eventually scrapped.

In December 2013, Marvel officially announced that Goddard would be the executive producer and showrunner for the Daredevil television series produced by Marvel Television and broadcast on Netflix in 2015. Sony Pictures also announced that Goddard would write and direct a film based on the Sinister Six, though the project was eventually cancelled. In May 2014, Goddard withdrew from showrunning duties on the Daredevil TV series.

In February 2015, after the deal between Marvel and Sony to share the rights to Spider-Man was announced, it was reported that Goddard was in talks with Sony to helm the new Spider-Man reboot film, Spider-Man: Homecoming, although it was later announced that Jon Watts would be the director. Goddard also executive produced and co-wrote an episode of the miniseries The Defenders. The series featured a team-up of the Marvel Television superheroes, including Daredevil. It was released on Netflix in August 2017.

Goddard wrote the film adaptation of Andy Weir's debut novel The Martian, initially planning to direct it himself for 20th Century Fox. He later left the project when offered a chance to direct Sinister Six, a now-canceled comic book adaptation based on a team of supervillains. The Martian was instead directed by Ridley Scott, and received wide critical acclaim. Goddard himself received an Academy Award nomination for Best Adapted Screenplay.

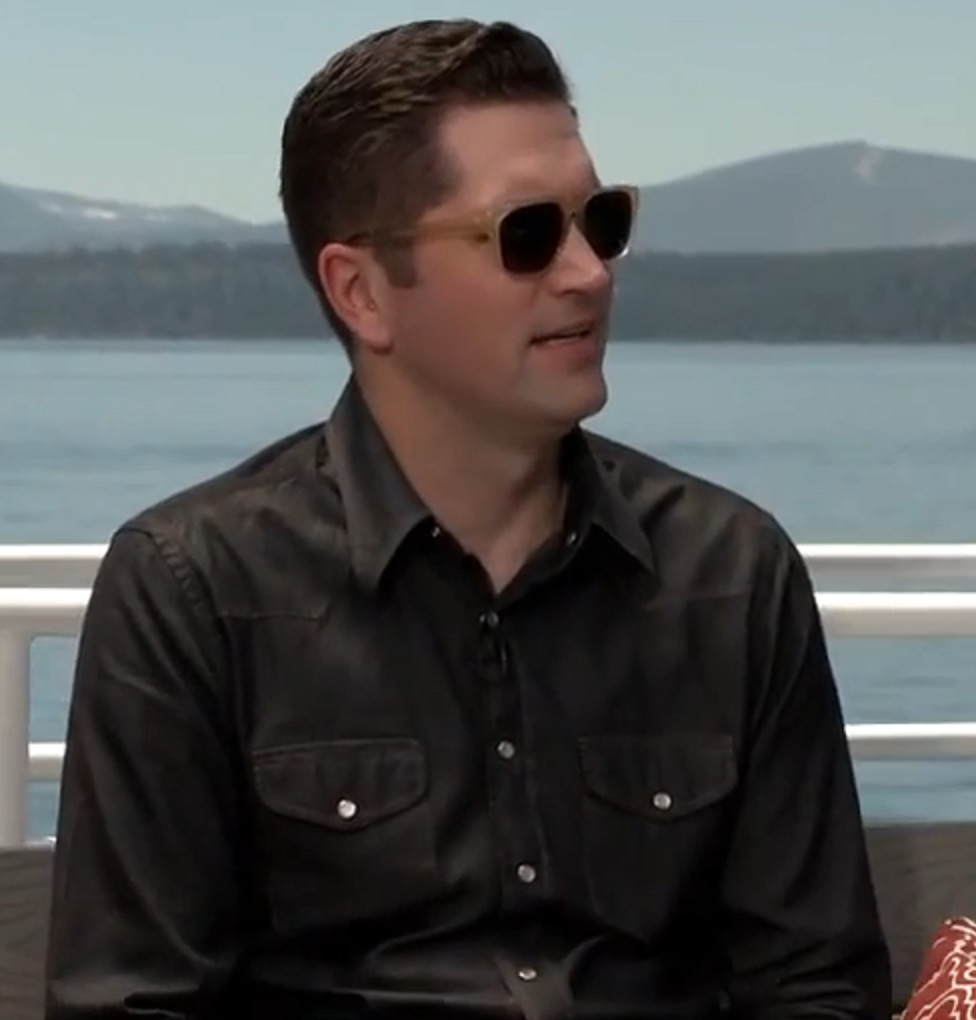
Goddard promoting Bad Times at the El Royale in 2018

In November 2016, Goddard began writing a spec script for the neo-noir thriller film Bad Times at the El Royale, which he sold to 20th Century Fox in March 2017, revealing he would also produce and direct. The film features an ensemble cast including Jeff Bridges, Cynthia Erivo, Dakota Johnson, Jon Hamm, Nick Offerman, and Chris Hemsworth. In 2019, his company, Goddard Textiles, struck a multiyear overall deal with Disney Television Studios via 20th Century Fox Television (now 20th Television) and ABC Signature.

=== 2020s ===
In June 2020 he was announced to be writing the screenplay for Project Hail Mary, based on the novel of the same name, with Phil Lord and Christopher Miller set to direct. In December 2022, FX ordered a pilot for The Trenches, a half-hour animated series created by Goddard. In January 2023, it was revealed Goddard had joined a writers' room assembled by James Gunn to map out the overarching story of the DC Universe. In April 2024, it was announced Goddard was set to write and direct a new installment in The Matrix franchise.

=== Potential projects ===
A film based on the Sinister Six was announced to be in development in December 2013, as part of Sony's plans for their own The Amazing Spider-Man shared universe, with Goddard attached to write and potentially direct. Goddard confirmed his intention to direct the film in April 2014. The film was believed to have been canceled by November 2015 when Sony was focusing on its new Spider-Man reboot with Marvel Studios, but producer Amy Pascal stated that the film was "alive" again in December 2018 following the success of Venom, and that she was waiting for Goddard to be ready to direct it before moving forward with the project, now to be set in the Sony's Spider-Man Universe.

In May 2016, Goddard was reported to be writing the screenplay for a film adaptation of the novel Wraiths Of The Broken Land, with Ridley Scott set to direct. By October 2017 he was also attached to write and produce a film adaptation of the young adult novel Nevermoor: The Trials of Morrigan Crow. It was announced in April 2019 that Goddard would write, produce, and possibly direct an adaptation of the graphic novel Sabrina for RT Features and Regency Enterprises.

== Personal life ==
Drew Goddard is married to Caroline Williams Goddard, a writer, whom he met at a Writers Guild of America meeting; at the time, she had been working on the American television series The Office. They live in the Los Angeles area. They have two daughters, Harlowe and Tess.

== Filmography ==
=== Film ===
Year	Title	Director	Writer	Producer
2008	Cloverfield	No	Yes	No
2011	The Cabin in the Woods	Yes	Yes	No
2013	World War Z	No	Yes	No
2015	The Martian	No	Yes	Executive
2018	Bad Times at the El Royale	Yes	Yes	Yes
2026	Project Hail Mary	No	Yes	Executive

Executive producer only

- 10 Cloverfield Lane (2016)
- The Cloverfield Paradox (2018)

Special thanks

- Superman (2025)

=== Television ===
Year	Title	Director	Writer	Producer	Notes
2002–2003	Buffy the Vampire Slayer	No	Yes	No	Episodes: 7.05 – "Selfless"; 7.07 – "Conversations with Dead People" (with Jane Espenson; Joss Whedon and Marti Noxon); 7.09 – "Never Leave Me"; 7.17 – "Lies My Parents Told Me" (with David Fury); 7.18 – "Dirty Girls"
2003–2004	Angel	No	Yes	No	Episodes: 5.07 – "Lineage"; 5.11 – "Damage" (with Steven S. DeKnight); 5.13 – "Why We Fight" (with DeKnight); 5.18 – "Origin"; 5.20 – "The Girl in Question" (with DeKnight); Also executive story editor
2005–2006	Alias	No	Yes	Yes	Episodes: 4.05 – "Welcome to Liberty Village"; 4.13 – "Tuesday" (with Breen Frazier); 5.04 – "Mockingbird"; 5.12 – "There's Only One Sydney Bristow" (100th episode); 5.17 – "All the Time in the World" (with Jeff Pinkner; series finale)
2005–2008	Lost	No	Yes	Yes	Episodes: 1.16 – "Outlaws"; 3.02 – "The Glass Ballerina" (with Jeff Pinkner); 3.08 – "Flashes Before Your Eyes" (with Damon Lindelof); 3.13 – "The Man from Tallahassee" (with Pinkner); 3.16 – "One of Us" (with Carlton Cuse); 3.20 – "The Man Behind the Curtain" (with Elizabeth Sarnoff); 4.02 – "Confirmed Dead" (with Brian K. Vaughan); 4.06 – "The Other Woman" (with Christina M. Kim); 4.09 – "The Shape of Things to Come" (with Vaughan); Also supervising producer
2015–2018	Daredevil	No	Yes	Executive	Episodes: 1.01 – "Into the Ring"; 1.02 – "Cut Man"; Creator
2016–2020	The Good Place	Yes	No	Executive	Episodes: 1.01 - "Everything is Fine"; 2.03 - "Dance Dance Resolution"; 4.01 - "A Girl from Arizona (Part 1)"; 4.02 - "A Girl from Arizona (Part 2)"
2017	The Defenders	No	Yes	Executive	Episode: 1.06 – "Ashes, Ashes" (with Marco Ramirez)
2024–present	High Potential	No	Yes	Executive	Episode: 1.01 – "Pilot"; Creator
2026–present	Phony	No	No	Executive	Episode: 1.01 – "Pilot"

== Bibliography ==
- Tales of the Vampires (Dark Horse Comics, collected in trade paperback, Tales of the Vampires, 144 pages, December 2004, ISBN 1569717494, Buffy the Vampire Slayer: Tales, 288 pages, January 2011, ISBN 1595826440):
  - "The Problem With Vampires" (with artist Paul Lee, in Tales of the Vampires #1, Dark Horse Comics, December 2003)
  - "Antique" (with artist Ben Stenbeck, in Tales of the Vampires #3, Dark Horse Comics, February 2004)
- Buffy the Vampire Slayer Season Eight #12–15: "Wolves at the Gate" (with pencils by Georges Jeanty and inks by Andy Owens, Dark Horse Comics, March–June 2008, tpb, Buffy The Vampire Slayer Season 8, Volume 3: Wolves at the Gate, 136 pages, November 2008, ISBN 1595821651)

== See also ==
- Mutant Enemy Productions
