= Destiny (Angel) =

- Angel episode
- Episode no.: Season 5 Episode 8
- Directed by: Skip Schoolnik
- Written by: David Fury; Steven S. DeKnight
- Production code: 5ADH08
- Original air date: November 19, 2003

Guest appearances
- Sarah Thompson as Eve; Mercedes McNab as Harmony Kendall; Juliet Landau as Drusilla; Christian Kane as Lindsey McDonald; Michael Halsey as Rutherford Sirk; Justin Connor as Jerry; Mark Kelly as Reese

Episode chronology
← Previous "Lineage"	Next → "Harm's Way"
- Angel season 5

"Destiny" is the 8th episode of the fifth season of the American television series Angel. Co-written by David Fury and Steven S. DeKnight and directed by Skip Schoolnik, it was originally broadcast on November 19, 2003 on the WB network. In the episode, Angel and Spike duel over a mystical grail to decide which one will be the champion, as flashbacks show the complex relationship between the two vampires. Guest star Juliet Landau reprises her role as Drusilla, and Christian Kane makes an uncredited appearance at the end of the episode playing Lindsey McDonald. The episode is notable for its large scale battle between the two vampires, as well as for being the focus of an indecency complaint by the Parents Television Council for sexual situations.

== Plot ==
Flashbacks to London in 1880 show William (not yet Spike) and Angelus meeting for the first time. They become good friends until William discovers Angelus having sex with Drusilla.

In the present day, Harmony opens a package for Spike from an unknown source, producing a flash of light. Spike finds he is corporeal again and celebrates with Harmony. Eve announces that Spike now qualifies as a champion and because there are two possible candidates for the fulfillment of the Shanshu Prophecy, "the wheel of destiny starts to spin off its axis". According to the prophecy, "The balance will falter until the vampire with a soul drinks from the Cup of Perpetual Torment." Sirk says that the cup is now in a destroyed opera house in Death Valley, Nevada. At the opera house, Spike and Angel battle it out for the cup. Spike emerges victorious, only to find that the cup was a set-up and Sirk has disappeared.

== Production ==
Although credited, Alexis Denisof doesn't appear in this episode. This was due to his and Alyson Hannigan's wedding at the time of filming. This is the only episode from which he is absent following his first Angel appearance in Season One's "Parting Gifts".

In the season retrospective, Joss Whedon says the battle between Angel and Spike in this episode is the highlight of the final season. That battle, Scott McLaren argues, "succeeds in portraying an almost perfect balance between the concepts of the soul as existential metaphor and ontological reality." Since the Shanshu prophesy destines the ensouled vampire to a pivotal and dangerous role in the ultimate battle between good and evil, Spike and Angel's souls function both as "heavy burdens and precious baubles."

Nancy Holder says this episode marks the transition from Spike's characterization as it was in the seventh season of Buffy to a new, "never-before seen" version, defined by his relationship with Angel instead of Buffy. When Angel tells Spike that "Buffy never really loved you, because you weren't me", and Spike responds with "Guess that means she was thinking about you all those time I was puttin' it to her", Holder says that Spike is "betraying all the soft emotion he had for her in his eagerness to deal Angel a blow." Rather than reacting out of love for Buffy, the new Spike cares only about putting down Angel.

Adam Ward, the first assistant/focus puller, says the scenes at the abandoned Opera House were unexpectedly difficult to film. "It's one thing to see it on camera and another being on location in this theater that hasn't been used other than for film shots for decades. You get in there and the matter that floats around looks great on camera but you just don't want to breathe it in."

=== Acting ===
Christian Kane returned as Lindsey McDonald in the last moment of the final scene of this episode, which Sarah Thompson describes as "a secret scene" that didn't appear in the original script. She says, "I heard rumors there was going to be a big reveal, but I didn't know what was going to happen. David Boreanaz was like, 'Maybe you're going to turn out to be a lizard.'" She received the scene in an envelope marked 'confidential' shortly before filming, with strict orders not to reveal Kane's return.

Juliet Landau, excited to return to Angel, says, "this is a particularly fun episode... There are so many different colors and dimensions. Even though [Spike and I] are the villains and we are evil, there always has been this very sweet love story between us."

== Reception ==
The Parents Television Council filed a complaint against a WB station for the flashback sex scene in which Angel's hips can be seen "moving back and forth." The PTC was also disturbed by the "heavy breathing" in an earlier scene between Darla and Drusilla. However, the Federal Communications Commission (FCC) later ruled that the scene was not indecent, as it was "brief, contained no nudity and was not sufficiently graphic or explicit to render the program patently offensive."

This episode, which ran during sweeps, was praised by TV Guide for the writers' decision to finally make Spike corporeal again. Reviewer Matt Roush says this episode stands with "the best of Buffy." Author Peter David agrees that the producers had perfect timing: "Just when we're getting sick of Spike as a ghost, suddenly, just like that, poof, he's not anymore."
