= The Cautionary Tale of Numero Cinco =

- Angel episode
- Episode no.: Season 5 Episode 6
- Directed by: Jeffrey Bell
- Written by: Jeffrey Bell
- Production code: 5ADH06
- Original air date: November 5, 2003

Guest appearances
- Danny Mora as Number Five; Bruno Gioiello as Security Guard

Episode chronology
← Previous "Life of the Party"	Next → "Lineage"
- Angel season 5

"The Cautionary Tale of Numero Cinco" is the sixth episode of the fifth season of the American television series Angel. Written and directed by Jeffrey Bell, it was originally broadcast on November 5, 2003 on the WB network.

== Plot ==
On the Mexican Day of the Dead, Angel has a run-in with a masked Wolfram & Hart employee. He is connected to an Aztec warrior demon named Tezcatcatl, who preys on the hearts of heroes. This leads Angel to wrestle with some personal issues when he learns about 'Los Hermanos Numeros', a family of five Mexican luchadores who helped the helpless until one day four were slain by Tezcatcatl. Angel helps the last member 'Number Five', the aforementioned employee, to discover the hero inside, which he lost when his family were killed. Angel, Five and his four brothers, temporarily back from the dead, battle and kill the demon. This leads to the death of Number Five, who is escorted into the afterlife by his brothers.

Meanwhile, Spike researches the Shanshu Prophecy about a vampire becoming human and thinks that he, not Angel, may be the vampire who will become human.

== Production ==
Writer/director Jeffrey Bell explains that he always wanted to work Mexican wrestling into one of his The X-Files scripts, but it wasn't until he pitched the idea to creator Joss Whedon that he was able to realize his "lifelong dream — to tell a story about Mexican wrestlers." The inspiration for the episode came partly from the real life Mexican wrestler Santo whose career included film roles as masked "luchador" fighting vampires and other supernatural foes, one of whose films was used in the Mystery Science Theater 3000 episode "Samson vs. the Vampire Women".
