= Mercedes McNab =

Canadian actress (born 1980)

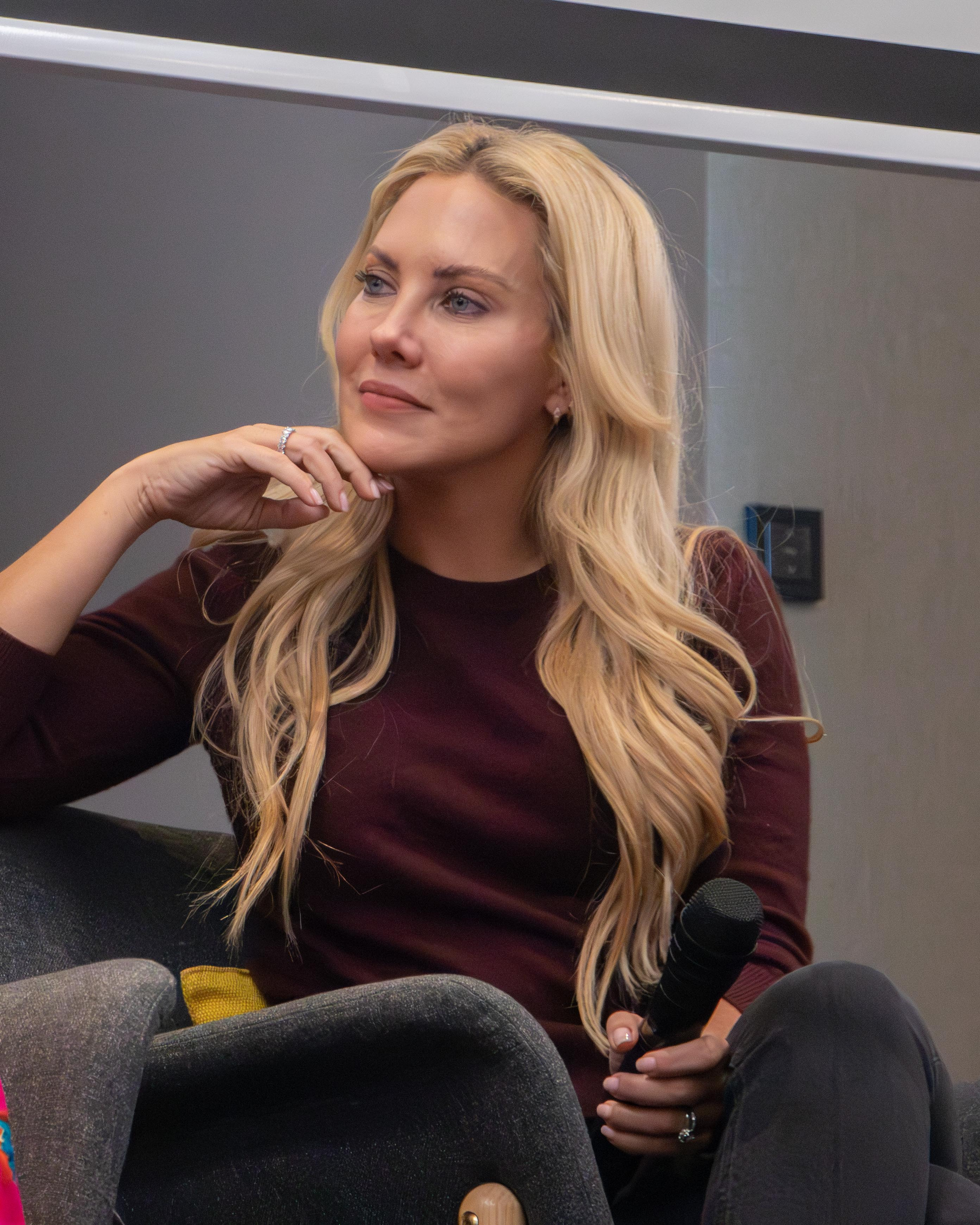
- Mercedes McNab at Whispers from the Hellmouth Convention, April 2024 (Paris).
- Born: Mercedes Alicia McNab; March 14, 1980 (age 46); Vancouver, British Columbia, Canada
- Occupation: Actress
- Years active: 1991–2011
- Spouse: Mark Henderson (m. 2012)
- Children: 2

Mercedes Alicia McNab (born March 14, 1980) is a retired Canadian actress. She is known for her role as Harmony Kendall on Buffy the Vampire Slayer (1997–2001) and its spinoff Angel (2001–2004). She additionally is known for her role as pretentious Amanda Buckman in Addams Family Values (1993) and Misty in the horror films Hatchet (2007) and Hatchet II (2010).

== Early life ==
McNab was born on March 14, 1980, in Vancouver, British Columbia. McNab's father is English former soccer player Bob McNab.

== Career ==
McNab received her first notable acting role in 1991 when she appeared as a Girl Scout selling cookies in The Addams Family. She played a more prominent role in the 1993 sequel Addams Family Values as snobby camper Amanda Buckman. In 1997, McNab was cast in a recurring role on The WB TV show Buffy the Vampire Slayer. McNab had initially auditioned for the lead role of Buffy Summers, which went to Sarah Michelle Gellar, and instead she played Harmony Kendall, a vapid, popular high-school student who eventually becomes a vampire. She appeared in 16 episodes over four years. McNab reprised this role when she was cast in the spin-off series Angel, which starred David Boreanaz. After a one-off guest role in season two, she became a recurring guest at the start of the show's final season, which aired from 2003 to 2004, and then a series regular midway through.

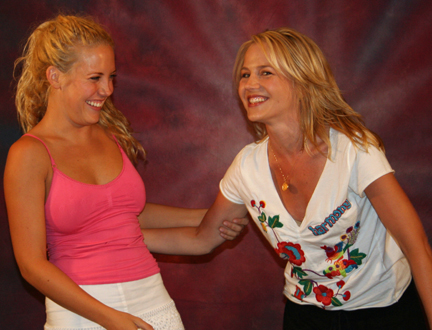
Mercedes McNab (left) and Julie Benz at the Booster Bash, October 2005

McNab went on to guest star in shows including Psych and Supernatural. In 2007, she appeared in a lead role in the slasher movie Hatchet, directed by Adam Green. She briefly appeared in the 2010 sequel Hatchet II and afterward starred in a number of direct-to-DVD horror movies such as Dark Reel and Thirst, as well as the TV-movie Vipers alongside Tara Reid.

McNab was the cover model for and was featured in a nude pictorial in the November 2006 issue of Playboy magazine. She was also featured in the FHM magazine's January 2004 USA issue.

McNab retired from acting in 2011.

== Personal life ==
McNab and real-estate developer Mark Henderson married on May 12, 2012, in La Paz, Mexico. The couple have two children, a daughter and a son.

She has not acted professionally since getting married.

== Filmography ==
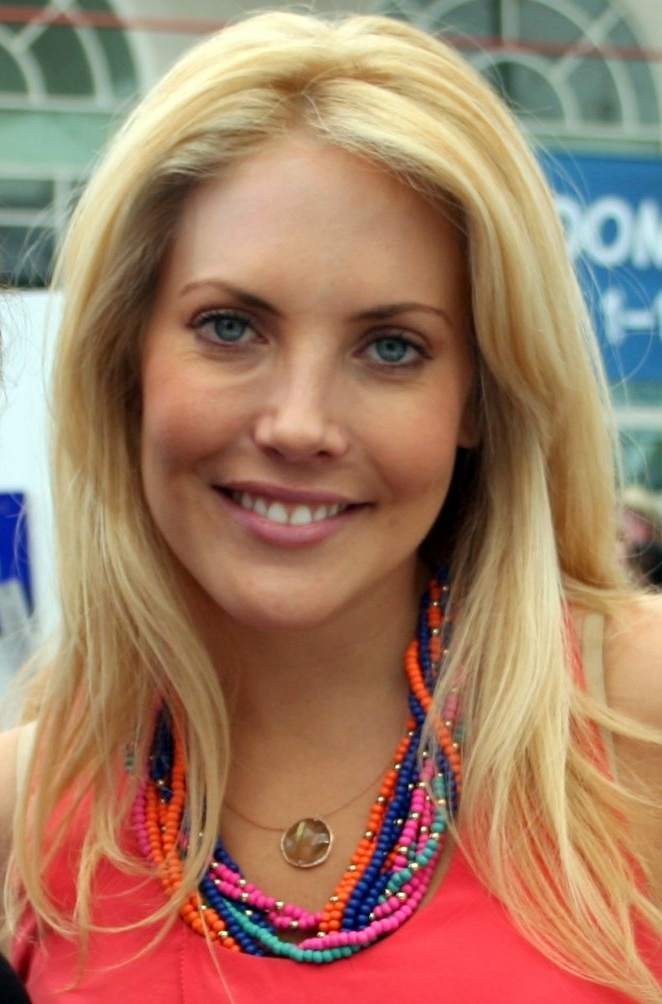
McNab in 2011

=== Film ===
Year	Title	Role	Notes
1991	The Addams Family	Girl Scout	
1993	Addams Family Values	Amanda Buckman	
1994	Savage Land	Hanna Morgan	
1994	The Fantastic Four	Young Sue Storm	Unreleased
2000	White Wolves III: Cry of the White Wolf	Pamela	
2006	Miles from Home	Ginger	Short film
2006	Hatchet	Misty	
2007	The Pink Conspiracy	Jamie	
2008	XII	Vicki	
2008	Dark Reel	Tara Leslie	
2010	Thirst	Atheria	Direct-to-video
2010	Hatchet II	Misty	

=== Television ===
Year	Title	Role	Notes
1992	Harry and the Hendersons	Lisa	"The Genius"
1994	The Adventures of Brisco County, Jr.	Shannon Trahern	"Brooklyn Dodgers"
1994	My So-Called Life	Connie	"Halloween"
1997–2001	Buffy the Vampire Slayer	Harmony Kendall	Recurring role; included unaired pilot 16 episodes
1997	Escape from Atlantis	Claudia Spencer	TV film
1998	USA High	Denise Miller	"Date Auction"
1998	Touched by an Angel	Jill	"Last Dance"
2001	Walker, Texas Ranger	Heather Preston	"6 Hours"
2001	Beer Money	Echo Olvera	TV film
2001–2004	Angel	Harmony Kendall	Guest role (season 2) Main role (season 5); 17 episodes
2002	Dawson's Creek	Grace	"Downtown Crossing"
2002	Boston Public	Mickey Tanner	"Chapter 38"
2004	Run of the House	Katie	"Undercover Brother"
2007	Crossing Jordan	Natalie Carson	"In Sickness & in Health"
2007	Reaper	Holly	"Love, Bullets and Blacktop"
2007	Supernatural	Lucy	"Fresh Blood"
2008	Psych	Viki Jenkins	"Daredevils!"
2008	Vipers	Georgie	TV film
2009	Criminal Minds	Brooke Lombardini	"Cold Comfort"
2010	Medium Raw: Night of the Wolf	Gillian Garvey	TV film
2011	Glass Heels	Carla	TV film
