= The Price (Angel) =

- Angel episode
- Episode no.: Season 3 Episode 19
- Directed by: Marita Grabiak
- Written by: David Fury
- Production code: 3ADH19
- Original air date: April 29, 2002

Guest appearances
- Andy Hallett as Lorne; Stephanie Romanov as Lilah Morgan; Daniel Dae Kim as Gavin Park; Mark Lutz as The Groosalugg; John Short as Phil Spivey; Vincent Kartheiser as Connor; Wayne Ford as Kid; Waleed Moursi as Manager

Episode chronology
← Previous "Double or Nothing"	Next → "A New World"
- Angel season 3

"The Price" is the 19th episode of the third season of the American television series Angel, originally broadcast on the WB network. In this episode, the Hyperion Hotel is infested with silicone slug-like parasites that dry up their human hosts. When Fred becomes infected, Gunn turns to the angry and reclusive Wesley for help. Angel is stunned when his lost infant son reappears, now an adolescent boy calling himself the Destroyer.

== Plot ==
As Angel tries to deal with the loss of his son while cleaning up the earthquake damage upstairs, a potential Angel Investigations client is infected by a transparent slug-like parasite in the hotel lobby. He goes to the juice bar across the street, where he chugs glass after glass of juice, saying, "We are thirsty." When Lorne informs him of the disturbance at the juice bar, Angel brings the infected man back to the hotel, where he collapses into a pile of human dust. When a slug-creature exits from the dust, the gang realizes the man was actually a parasitic host. The hotel is locked up tight and Angel sends everyone out with weapons to hunt for the slug. As they search, they realize that the hotel is teeming with the parasites, which suck their human hosts dry. Angel suspects that the infestation is a result of "thaumogenesis", a price for the dark magics that Angel conjured to try to find his son.

Meanwhile, at Wolfram & Hart, Lilah and Gavin once again quarrel with each other over their handling of Angel. Lilah and Gavin receive a top-secret e-mail about the consequences of Angel's dark magic at the hotel, which Lilah may also have to deal with since she was involved in the spell. She plans to rid the hotel of the slugs, until Gavin relays the message that Linwood wants Angel and the others to die for the torment he was put through.

After learning the creatures glow in the dark, Angel shuts off all of the lights in the hotel and tracks the slugs by sound to a large ballroom. Researching by the light of a lantern, Fred is attacked by one of the slugs, which slithers into her mouth. Realizing Fred has been infected, Gunn brings her to the rest of the gang in the abandoned ballroom, saying they need to get her to a hospital; Angel stands in the way, determined to keep more innocents from dying. Groosalugg, hearing the slugs under the floor, breaks through the wood with an ax. Below, there is a hidden swimming pool, filled with the glowing slugs. They begin chasing after the gang. Everyone retreats to a kitchen and barricade themselves there, except for Gunn, who slips out to ask Wesley for help. Wesley is very bitter about his exile from the group and refuses until Gunn reveals that Fred has been infected. He tosses Gunn a bottle of alcohol and tells him he'll help this time, but he never wants to see any of his former friends again.

Angel takes the water away from Fred until the slug confesses that a vicious killer called The Destroyer has chased the slugs into this dimension in search of Angel. They try to press Fred for more information, but her condition worsens. Gunn shows up and directs Groo and Lorne to hold Fred down while they force her to drink alcohol. As it dehydrates her, she coughs up the slug and Groo stabs it with a sword. Meanwhile, the slugs close in on Cordelia and Angel in the kitchen. Cordelia suddenly begins to glow a bright white, illuminating the entire hotel. This kills all the slugs and leaves everyone stunned by her new power.

Lorne reminds the gang of the coming of "the Destroyer" and, almost immediately, lights flash and a big nasty demon appears, followed shortly by a young man who quickly slays the demon. He smiles and points a weapon at Angel, saying, "Hi Dad."
