= Benediction (Angel) =

- Angel episode
- Episode no.: Season 3 Episode 21
- Directed by: Tim Minear
- Written by: Tim Minear
- Production code: 3ADH21
- Original air date: May 13, 2002

Guest appearances
- Vincent Kartheiser as Connor; Laurel Holloman as Justine Cooper; Mark Lutz as The Groosalugg; Andy Hallett as Lorne; Stephanie Romanov as Lilah Morgan; Keith Szarabajka as Daniel Holtz

Episode chronology
← Previous "A New World"	Next → "Tomorrow"
- Angel season 3

"Benediction" is the 21st episode of the third season of the American television series Angel.

== Plot ==
The gang starts to plan a search for Angel, but it's unnecessary as he returns to the hotel. He informs them that he found Connor and they talked, but Angel's battle wounds tell a much more violent tale to his friends. He adds that Connor wants to be known as Steven and that he has an open invitation to come back. They worry about something other than Connor escaping from the portal before it was closed. Meanwhile, Connor gets a room at a motel for Holtz and himself.

Angel shows up in time to stake the vampire Connor followed and reminds his son that vampires are capable of being very quiet.

Connor shows up at the hotel and Lorne tries to escort him to Angel, but Connor refuses to go anywhere with a demon. Lorne has a hard time controlling himself when Connor insults him but Cordelia shows up in time to break it up. She sits Connor down and tries to explain that some demons are good, but when she confesses to being part-demon herself, Connor jumps on her and raises a knife threateningly. In response, Cordelia starts to glow white, enveloping Connor with the glow as well. The blade of his weapon dissolves and she comforts him as he suddenly breaks down into tears. Later, she reveals that she released the darkness and Quor-Toth from Connor.

While Connor runs to the motel, Angel parks his car and reads Holtz's words. The letter explains Holtz's need to let go of Connor because it is the best thing to do and Connor will hopefully appreciate it later in life. In the parking lot outside the hotel, Justine begs Holtz to change his mind, but he insists she goes through with what he wants. She uses an ice pick to stab him twice in the neck and he dies with his final word, "Steven." Connor finally reaches the motel, but instead of finding Holtz in the room, he finds him lying dead in Justine's lap, two puncture marks in his neck. With great confidence, Connor assumes, "Angelus."
