= A New World (Angel) =

- Angel episode
- Episode no.: Season 3 Episode 20
- Directed by: Tim Minear
- Written by: Jeffrey Bell
- Production code: 3ADH20
- Original air date: May 6, 2002

Guest appearances
- Vincent Kartheiser as Connor; Andy Hallett as Lorne; Stephanie Romanov as Lilah Morgan; Mark Lutz as The Groosalugg; Erika Thormahlen as Sunny; Anthony Starke as Tyke; Deborah Zoe as Mistress Meerna; Keith Szarabajka as Daniel Holtz

Episode chronology
← Previous "The Price"	Next → "Benediction"
- Angel season 3

"A New World" is the 20th episode of the third season of the American television series Angel. Written by Jeff Bell and directed by Tim Minear, it was originally broadcast on May 6, 2002, on the WB television network. In "A New World", Angel's son Connor returns from the demon dimension Quor'Toth. Raised by Holtz to be a feral teenage warrior, Connor seeks to kill Angel for his murderous past. Failing to do so, Connor flees from the hotel with Angel one step behind him. Lorne tracks down a sorceress to try to close the dimensional rift to Quor'Toth before other monsters emerge. Also, Wesley, living as a recluse in his apartment, gets an offer from Lilah for a job at Wolfram & Hart.

== Plot ==
Connor fires stakes at Angel, but Angel dodges them. Everyone takes on a defensive position, and a fight breaks out between Angel, the Groosalugg, Gunn and Connor.

Angel tries to reason with his son and end the violence, but Connor simply knocks Gunn and Groo out of the way and continues to fight with Angel. Focused on the fight, Angel gets the upper hand on Connor, but before he can do anything harmful to Connor, Angel stops himself. Connor takes the opportunity to run, and Angel tries to follow, but the daylight and his friends stop him.

On the streets, Connor saves a drug addict named Sunny from her dealer. They find a place to stay, where Sunny and Connor share a kiss.

Connor wakes up in the middle of the night to find that Sunny has overdosed in the bathroom. Angel finds Connor and tries to explain why he couldn't save him, but Connor punches Angel and calls Holtz his father.

An officer enters the room and aims for Connor, but Angel takes the shot in his back. Connor pauses in his escape out of a window as Angel struggles to get up, and finally the two escape together. While hiding from the police on the streets, Angel tells Connor he has somewhere to go if he needs it, and he will always be there whenever Connor needs him. Connor knows he's not alone: he runs off down an alleyway where he greets a much older Holtz - the only father he has ever known.

== Production ==
Series creator Joss Whedon explains his decision to instantly bring Connor to adulthood: "What are you going to do? Have a baby running around? I don't think so...That's the beauty of it being a fantasy show."
