= Tomorrow (Angel) =

- Angel episode
- Episode no.: Season 3 Episode 22
- Directed by: David Greenwalt
- Written by: David Greenwalt
- Production code: 3ADH22
- Original air date: May 20, 2002

Guest appearances
- John Rubinstein as Linwood Murrow; Vincent Kartheiser as Connor; Laurel Holloman as Justine Cooper; Mark Lutz as The Groosalugg; Andy Hallett as Lorne; Stephanie Romanov as Lilah Morgan; Daniel Dae Kim as Gavin Park; David Denman as Skip; Keith Szarabajka as Daniel Holtz

Episode chronology
← Previous "Benediction"	Next → "Deep Down"
- Angel season 3

"Tomorrow" is the 22nd and final episode of the third season of the American television series Angel. The episode was written and directed by executive producer David Greenwalt. The narrative of the season three finale deals with Angel's complex relationship with his son (made worse by the evil law firm Wolfram & Hart). The episode and season is left on a cliffhanger of Angel being thrown to the bottom of the ocean. This is the last episode written by Greenwalt, as he left the show after this season and was no longer an executive producer or the showrunner. He would return to direct an episode in the show's fifth and final season.

== Plot synopsis ==
After the events of the last episode, Connor has come to live with Angel. Angel is happy in his newfound relationship with his son, but Connor is secretly waiting for revenge, mistakenly believing Angel killed Holtz - just as Holtz had planned as his final revenge on Angel. They train together at the hotel before going to a drive-in movie, where the pair fight off an armed hit group, sent by Linwood and Gavin] at Wolfram & Hart to abduct Connor. Meanwhile, Lilah continues to try to recruit Wesley by manipulation and seduction, and shows him that he is now very much like her: a human without a soul.

The Groosalugg awaits Cordelia as she arrives to her apartment. He tells her he is leaving town because he knows that Angel is her priority. He tells her he will never be the man she loves, and she needs to go be with Angel. As they are having this conversation, Lorne and Angel are having a mirror conversation, where Lorne tells Angel Cordelia feels the same way about him as he does her. The scene cuts back to Cordelia, confused by what the Groosalugg has told her. She experiences a vision of herself, saying "I'm in love!" to which present day Cordelia questions "With Angel?" to which vision Cordelia replies "With Angel!" After the vision ends, Cordelia calls Angel to arrange a meeting at the beach "to talk about us". Angel tells Connor he has to leave so that he can meet Cordelia, and Connor gives him his loving approval to be with her. As Cordelia is fighting traffic to meet Angel, everything freezes. She gets out of the car and is confronted by the demon guide, Skip, who tells her that as a higher being, it’s now time for her to leave Earth’s plane of existence and move on to another. In this scene we see the conversation from her earlier vision take place, as she declares her love for Angel to Skip. As she is having this conversation, Connor confronts Angel at the beach and they fight. Connor mocks Angel by saying the same thing Angel said when they sparred earlier in the season. Connor knocks out Angel using a stun gun. He flashes his flash light into the ocean and then a boat, commanded by Justine, flashes back. As we're shown Cordelia ascending, a vengeful Connor and Justine seal Angel in a metal coffin and throw it off a boat to sink down to the ocean floor.
