= Angel season 3 =

Angel
- Season 3
- Region 1 Season 3 DVD cover
- Showrunners: Joss Whedon; David Greenwalt
- Starring: David Boreanaz; Charisma Carpenter; Alexis Denisof; J. August Richards; Amy Acker
- No. of episodes: 22

Release
- Original network: The WB
- Original release: September 24, 2001 – May 20, 2002

Season chronology
- ← Previous; Season 2 Next → Season 4

The third season of the television series Angel, the spin-off of Buffy the Vampire Slayer, premiered on September 24, 2001, on The WB and concluded its 22-episode season on May 20, 2002. The season aired in a new timeslot, Mondays at 9:00 pm ET. This was the first season where Angel and Buffy did not air on the same network, as Buffy had moved to the UPN network beginning with its sixth season.

== Cast and characters ==
=== Main cast ===
- David Boreanaz as Angel
- Charisma Carpenter as Cordelia Chase
- Alexis Denisof as Wesley Wyndam-Pryce
- J. August Richards as Charles Gunn
- Amy Acker as Winifred "Fred" Burkle

=== Recurring cast ===
- Andy Hallett as Lorne
- Stephanie Romanov as Lilah Morgan
- Keith Szarabajka as Daniel Holtz
- Daniel Dae Kim as Gavin Park
- Jack Conley as Sahjhan
- Laurel Holloman as Justine Cooper
- Mark Lutz as Groosalugg
- Julie Benz as Darla
- John Rubinstein as Linwood Murrow
- Vincent Kartheiser as Connor
- David Denman as Skip
- Matthew James as Merl

== Crew ==
Series creators Joss Whedon and David Greenwalt served as executive producers, while Greenwalt would serve as the series' showrunner as Whedon was running Buffy and developing his new series, Firefly. Whedon wrote and directed one episode during the season; "Waiting in the Wings". Greenwalt wrote four of the season's episodes and directed two, the premiere and the finale. Tim Minear was promoted to executive producer midseason and wrote and/or directed six episodes of the season including important, Connor-centric episodes such as "Lullaby", "A New World" and "Benediction". Buffy writer/producer Marti Noxon served as consulting producer for her final season on Angel, as she was also running Buffy since she was promoted to executive producer. Buffy writer David Fury wrote one freelance episode, and he officially joined the writing staff in the following season.

The only other returning writer was Mere Smith, who was promoted to story editor. New additions included Jeffrey Bell, who wrote and/or co-wrote six episodes during the season, and served as co-producer, then promoted to producer midseason. Scott Murphy was hired as story editor, although he only wrote two episodes in the first half of the season. Buffy script coordinator David H. Goodman was hired to write two freelance episodes.

This was the last season in which both David Greenwalt and Tim Minear served as full-time writer-producers, as Minear left to help develop Whedon's new series, Firefly and Greenwalt left as his contract with Fox was up. They both served as consulting producers for subsequent seasons.

Writer Tim Minear directed the highest number of episodes in the third season, directing four episodes.

== Episodes ==
No. overall	No. in season	Title	Directed by	Written by	Original release date	Prod. code	U.S. viewers (millions)
45	1	"Heartthrob"	David Greenwalt	David Greenwalt	September 24, 2001	3ADH01	5.01
As Angel mourns Buffy's death, he battles a lovelorn vampire seeking revenge for the death of his beloved.
46	2	"That Vision Thing"	Bill L. Norton	Jeffrey Bell	October 1, 2001	3ADH03	4.83
Lilah coerces Angel's help in securing the release of a prisoner the "Powers That Be" have locked in a fiery prison.
47	3	"That Old Gang of Mine"	Fred Keller	Tim Minear	October 8, 2001	3ADH02	4.48
Gunn's loyalties are torn between his current demon-hunting associates and the gang he used to hang out with when his old gang starts murdering innocent demons.
48	4	"Carpe Noctem"	James A. Contner	Scott Murphy	October 15, 2001	3ADH04	4.99
An old man uses an ancient incantation to switch bodies with Angel.
49	5	"Fredless"	Marita Grabiak	Mere Smith	October 22, 2001	3ADH05	4.53
When Fred's parents come to take her home, she feels she should go with them as she doesn't belong to the gang.
50	6	"Billy"	David Grossman	Tim Minear & Jeffrey Bell	October 29, 2001	3ADH06	4.18
Angel's friends are affected by a man called Billy with the power to make other men brutalize women, forcing Fred to deal with a psychotic Wesley and Gunn.
51	7	"Offspring"	Turi Meyer	David Greenwalt	November 5, 2001	3ADH07	4.45
As the crew researches a prophecy about the arrival of a being of huge profound impact on the world, Darla arrives at the hotel pregnant.
52	8	"Quickening"	Skip Schoolnik	Jeffrey Bell	November 12, 2001	3ADH08	5.20
As Angel and his friends try to determine what kind of baby Darla will have, Holtz starts his search for Angel.
53	9	"Lullaby"	Tim Minear	Tim Minear	November 19, 2001	3ADH09	4.87
As Darla goes through a difficult labor, Holtz pursues Angel.
54	10	"Dad"	Fred Keller	David H. Goodman	December 10, 2001	3ADH10	3.81
Angel tries to keep his son safe from the many demons, vampires and humans who would like to harm the baby.
55	11	"Birthday"	Michael Grossman	Mere Smith	January 14, 2002	3ADH11	4.30
On her birthday, Cordelia learns her visions will kill her unless she goes back in time and chooses a different path in life.
56	12	"Provider"	Bill L. Norton	Scott Murphy	January 21, 2002	3ADH12	4.36
Fred solves a puzzle for a group of demons who literally want to buy her brain, stalking her.
57	13	"Waiting in the Wings"	Joss Whedon	Joss Whedon	February 4, 2002	3ADH13	4.57
Angel and his friends attend a ballet, where Angel realizes he saw exactly the same dancers on stage 110 years ago.
58	14	"Couplet"	Tim Minear	Tim Minear & Jeffrey Bell	February 18, 2002	3ADH14	4.10
Angel struggles with his jealousy of the newly arrived Groosalugg.
59	15	"Loyalty"	James A. Contner	Mere Smith	February 25, 2002	3ADH15	4.36
Wesley dreads the fulfilment of the prophecy that Angel will kill Connor.
60	16	"Sleep Tight"	Terrence O'Hara	David Greenwalt	March 4, 2002	3ADH16	4.50
To save Connor's life, Wesley takes him away from Angel.
61	17	"Forgiving"	Turi Meyer	Jeffrey Bell	April 15, 2002	3ADH17	4.31
As Fred and Gunn search for Wesley, Angel searches for Sahjhan to learn more about the prophecy that he would kill Connor.
62	18	"Double or Nothing"	David Grossman	David H. Goodman	April 22, 2002	3ADH18	4.39
When a demon that Gunn once sold his soul to comes to collect on the debt, Angel, Groosalugg, Fred and Cordelia help to save him.
63	19	"The Price"	Marita Grabiak	David Fury	April 29, 2002	3ADH19	4.28
Angel's hotel is infested by demonic slugs created by the spell he used to alter Sahjhan.
64	20	"A New World"	Tim Minear	Jeffrey Bell	May 6, 2002	3ADH20	5.17
Angel's son returns from another dimension, now a teenager. Angel pursues Connor, who makes a new friend on the streets.
65	21	"Benediction"	Tim Minear	Tim Minear	May 13, 2002	3ADH21	4.69
Holtz insists that Connor rejoin Angel. Meanwhile, Justine learns Holtz is back.
66	22	"Tomorrow"	David Greenwalt	David Greenwalt	May 20, 2002	3ADH22	4.64
Angel and Cordelia plan to meet to finally acknowledge their feelings.

=== Crossovers with Buffy the Vampire Slayer ===
The third season of Angel coincided with the sixth season of Buffy the Vampire Slayer. With this season, Buffy switched networks from The WB to UPN, while Angel still remained on The WB. Because they were on competing networks, there were no official crossovers. At the time, WB Entertainment President Jordan Levin stated "There will be no crossovers between Angel and Buffy. I think it's more important, in the long term, that Angel really establishes itself as a world that obviously comes from the same mythology, but operates with its own set of principles, guidelines and characters, and really establishes itself independently from Buffy."

== Reception ==
The third season was nominated for three Saturn Awards – Best Network Television Series, Best Actor on Television (David Boreanaz) and Female Cinescape Genre Face of the Future Award (Amy Acker). The episode "Waiting in the Wings" was nominated for a Hugo Award for Best Dramatic Presentation, Short Form.

The Futon Critic named "Billy" the 36th best episode of 2001 and "That Vision Thing" the 14th best episode of 2001.

The third season averaged 4.4 million viewers, slightly lower than the sixth season of Buffy.

== DVD release ==
Angel: The Complete Third Season was released on DVD in region 1 on February 10, 2004 and in region 2 on March 3, 2003. The DVD includes all 22 episodes on 6 discs presented in anamorphic widescreen 1.78:1 aspect ratio. Special features on the DVD include three commentary tracks—"Billy" by writers Tim Minear and Jeffrey Bell; "Lullaby" by writer/director Tim Minear and Mere Smith; and "Waiting in the Wings" by writer/director Joss Whedon. There are two sets of deleted scenes, for "Birthday" with commentary by Tim Minear and Mere Smith and "Waiting in the Wings" with commentary by Joss Whedon. Featurettes include, "Darla: Deliver Us From Evil", a featurette on the character of Darla with interviews with actress Julie Benz; "Page to Screen" which details the process from the script to the completed episode; and "Season 3 Overview" is a summary of the season featuring interviews with cast and crew members. Also included are screen tests for Amy Acker and Vincent Kartheiser, series outtakes, and photo galleries.
