= Waiting in the Wings (Angel) =

- Angel episode
- Summer Glau as Prima Ballerina
- Episode no.: Season 3 Episode 13
- Directed by: Joss Whedon
- Written by: Joss Whedon
- Production code: 3ADH13
- Original air date: February 4, 2002

Guest appearances
- Andy Hallett as Lorne; Mark Harelik as Count Kurskov; Mark Lutz as The Groosalugg; Summer Glau as Prima Ballerina; Thomas Crawford as Manager; Don Tiffany as Security Guard

Episode chronology
| ← Previous "Provider" | Next → "Couplet" |
- Angel season 3

"Waiting in the Wings" is the thirteenth episode of the third season of the American television series Angel. Written and directed by series creator Joss Whedon, it was originally broadcast on February 4, 2002, on the WB network. In "Waiting in the Wings", Angel takes the gang out for an evening at the ballet but becomes suspicious when the prima ballerina (Summer Glau) is the same one he saw dance more than 100 years ago. When Cordelia and Angel sneak backstage to investigate, they are consumed by overwhelming passion for each other as they are possessed by spirits of unrequited ballet lovers held captive by the sinister ballet troupe leader. Also, Fred finds that both Wesley and Gunn have feelings for her too, but she must eventually choose one of them.

== Plot ==
Wesley researches a demon from one of Cordelia's visions while Cordelia questions Wesley about his romantic feelings towards Fred. After Gunn and Fred return from breakfast, Angel announces he is taking them all to a ballet production of Giselle, by the same company he witnessed perform in 1890.

At the theater, the company's owner, Count Kurskov, promises the theater manager an unforgettable show while a shadowed figure watches from above the stage and laughs. In preparation for their glamorous night at the ballet, Fred and Cordelia shop for new dresses, which they intend to return after wearing them for the night. Subtly, Cordelia broaches the subject of Fred's romantic interests, but Cordelia thinks Fred's mind is on Wesley, when it's really on Gunn.

Compliments are directed to everyone as their attire is revealed at the hotel, and they depart together. At the theater, Cordelia is literally bored to sleep while the others enjoy the show. Angel finds the dancers familiar since he saw the same people perform the first time he saw the show. During intermission, Angel tells his friends about his revelation. He and Cordelia sneak backstage to investigate, where they discover they are mystically trapped in a maze of corridors.

Looking through the prima ballerina's dressing room, Angel observes that the dressing room hasn't changed in two hundred years as Cordelia examines a cross necklace from a table. Both feel the room warm, and Cordelia suddenly asks Angel to undress her. Soon they find themselves possessed by spirits in love and are unable to keep their hands off each other, until Cordelia accidentally burns Angel with the cross. Both come to their senses and leave the dressing room before things go too far.

Worried, Fred encourages the guys to help her look for the missing Angel and Cordelia. The Count directs his demon minions to deal with those sneaking around backstage. While trying to escape the backstage halls, Cordelia recalls an element of fear she felt while possessed. She convinces Angel to reenter the dressing room so that they can break the spell holding them backstage, where they are possessed by the spirits again with wild passion for each other. Cordelia calls Angel "Stefan" and confesses her fears of another man who is controlling her life. They kiss, and "Stefan" offers to take her away, but she wants him to help her deal with the problem instead. As Fred tends to a wound Gunn received in the battle with the Count's minions, he jokes about his injury, and Fred gets emotional because she thought he was seriously hurt. The two kiss as Wesley quietly discovers them and walks away sadly.

The ballet continues on stage as the gang gathers backstage. Wesley explains that the Count was a wizard who discovered the prima ballerina whom he adored had a lover. To repay her for her betrayal, the count forced her into a temporal shift where she would dance for only him, forever. As Angel searches for the Count's power center, he finds the prima ballerina waiting in the wings, resigned to perform the same dance for the rest of eternity. Angel tells her to break the magic holding her prisoner, she has to change the dance. She dances on stage using her own steps. Angel attacks the Count and, guessing the power center is in a medallion the count wears, smashes it with a powerful punch, finally releasing the ballet dancers. Wesley dresses Gunn's injury and watches on in emotional agony as Fred and Gunn exchange loving looks.

Angel and Cordelia agree that they are embarrassed about what happened between them while they were possessed. As Angel is about to declare his feelings for Cordelia, the Groosalugg from Pylea appears on the stairs, drawing Cordelia's attention. Groo and Cordelia kiss as Lorne comes downstairs to inform Angel that Pylea has formed a republic; with no need for a monarch, Groo returned for his true love, Cordelia. Angel goes upstairs to check on Connor while Fred and Wesley watch on. Wesley realizes the path of love is not something that can be foretold.

== Production ==
In the DVD commentary, writer/director Joss Whedon revealed that the main impetus for this episode was learning that Amy Acker danced ballet for fifteen years, although he also was excited to see the group dressed up.

Whedon filmed a scene in which Amy Acker and Alexis Denisof dance in the ballet. The scene, which was ultimately cut, was a fantasy of Wesley's during the performance. In the scene, Amy Acker - who danced fifteen years - dances properly, while Alexis Denisof dances farcically. The scene is included on the DVD as a bonus feature.

This episode was shot on location at the Orpheum Theater in downtown Los Angeles.

=== Acting ===
This episode features Summer Glau in her first acting role as a Prima Ballerina cursed to carry out the same performance over and over again. Glau, who is also a classically trained ballerina, would go on to star in Angel co-creator Joss Whedon's Firefly later that year as River Tam, and later have a recurring role in his show Dollhouse.

== Reception ==
In her essay examining the maturation of Wesley's character over time, Stacey Abbott writes, "Denisof delivers a fearless comedic performance as he...prances across the stage with little grace and elegance", undercutting the romantic atmosphere of the ballet - which ultimately resulted in the scene being cut to maintain the more serious tone of the episode.
