= Loyalty (Angel) =

- Angel episode
- Episode no.: Season 3 Episode 15
- Directed by: James A. Contner
- Written by: Mere Smith
- Production code: 3ADH15
- Original air date: February 25, 2002

Guest appearances
- Stephanie Romanov as Lilah Morgan; Laurel Holloman as Justine Cooper; Jack Conley as Sahjhan; Wendy Davis as Aubrey Jenkins; Enrique Castillo as Doctor; Keith Szarabajka as Daniel Holtz; Susan Martino as Mother #1 / Mrs. Ferguson; Annie Talbot as Mother #2; Marci Hill as Nurse; Chris Devlin as Holtzian Man; Thom Scott II as Holtzian Man #2

Episode chronology
← Previous "Couplet"	Next → "Sleep Tight"
- Angel season 3

"Loyalty" is the 15th episode of the third season of the American television series Angel.

== Plot synopsis ==
Gunn and Fred arrive at the office to find Wesley asleep at his desk and wake him as they try to touch the papers he's been working with. Angel cheerfully comments about teaching Connor to die before he vamps and leans in to bite his son while the others watch on. Wesley sees his hands coated with blood against the book, and then he wakes up. Angel and Wesley take Connor to the doctor and while in the waiting room, Angel offers advice to some of the mothers waiting there. During the examination, the doctor informs Angel that his son is healthy and blood tests should be returned within the week to confirm nothing is wrong. After the room is cleared, one of the women from the waiting room enters and exchanges Connor's blood sample with a fake before a nurse discovers her.

At the hotel, Angel unpacks a box of miniature hockey equipment and a personalized jersey for Connor. With Cordelia away, business is slow. Angel and Gunn play hockey together until Angel breaks a window with the puck. A woman in need of help, Aubrey, comes to Angel Investigations about her son who had run away and been turned into a vampire. Aubrey returns to Holtz, Justine and others, reporting back on the members of the Angel Investigations team. Human members of Holtz's team practice fighting vampires that are chained up in the hideaway. Sahjhan appears and questions the progress of Holtz's efforts to kill Angel. Holtz, however, refuses to speed up his timetable and isn't remotely concerned by Sahjhan's threats because he is immaterial and Holtz happens to be in possession of a special urn that can contain his essence. Sahjhan isn't happy, but leaves.

Wesley talks on the phone with a wizard and directs him to do his job for the money he was paid. Fred shows up and suggests that Wesley hook up with Aubrey, but Wesley brushes it off and says the job is their purpose, not dating. Lilah talks with her sick mother on the phone until, Sahjhan shows up at Wolfram & Hart in Lilah's office. She is not shocked to see him, and she knows quite a bit about him already, right down to his need for the law firm's help in destroying Angel. Lilah states that she won't go against firm policy which is to keep Angel alive, but she writes on a piece of paper that he has her support.

Sahjhan explains that he needs Connor's blood, and Lilah surprises him by explaining that it's already possessed by the firm since they stole it from the hospital where Connor was cared for. At a carnival on the pier, Fred tries to concentrate on work while Gunn is more interested in playing around and spending time with her. Wesley's knowledge of their relationship is discussed, and Gunn finds out that Wesley said something to Fred that led her to question the appropriateness of their relationship. Upset by that, he stresses that he won't let Wesley impede his efforts at a good personal and working relationship with Fred.

Wesley drops in to check on the two of them. The vampire drinks from a glass of blood while his attention is divided between his son and his friend. Looking troubled, Wesley leaves for a little while. Back at the carnival, Fred spots a man breaking into a building and Gunn leads the way to follow him. Inside the building is a carousel, which turns on and as Gunn prepares for battle, he and Fred suddenly find themselves completely surrounded by vampires. Holtz's protégé, Justine, films the events with a man at her side.

Fred runs away at Gunn's insistence and he takes all of the vampires on alone. Justine and the man watch, commenting on Gunn's chance at survival. Gunn holds his own for a short while before he's grabbed by a vampire and Fred returns in time to stake the vampire and save Gunn. As Justine and her friend depart, Gunn and Fred appreciate that they're both alive.

Wesley follows a GPS unit to a precise location where he finds a hamburger-shaped speaker outside of a fast-food restaurant. He performs a ritual, calling on Alegba, and the plastic cartoonish hamburger comes to life. The Loa, as Wesley calls it, confirms his suspicion that Angel will "devour" his son and informs him that the prophecy cannot be stopped. It predicts a future of betrayal and agony for Wesley. The Loa finally reveals that when the earth shakes, the air burns and the sky turns to blood, the prophecy will come true. Lilah meets Sahjhan at a bar and ignores Sahjhan's attempts at small talk, informing him that arrangements have been made to deal with their Angel problem.

Aubrey returns to the office and thanks Wesley for his help in destroying the monsters. Wesley is thrown by her identification of "monsters" and accepts her check in return for their services. She tries to come onto him and Wesley calls her on her attempt to play him. Angel appears behind her and makes it clear that he knows who she's working for and that no one will be harming Connor. As she runs away, a small earthquake shakes the ground and Wesley realizes that the first portent has come true.

Holtz directs the humans to study the video of Fred and Gunn by the carousel. Aubrey returns, but much to her surprise, Wesley has followed her. Wesley explains that he is there in peace and tries to persuade Holtz that Angel is not the same vampire as Angelus. Holtz knows too much pain at Angelus's hands to care about the difference; he also knows why Wesley is there and suggests he prepare for what he'll feel when Connor is killed. Gunn and Fred have their regular meal together and talk about how right their relationship really is. He is worried that they can't do so many things at once and is worried about the consequences if things don't work out. She wonders what his decision would be if he had to choose between her and work, and he admits to choosing her.

Wesley finds Angel with Connor in his room, preparing a meal for his child. They talk about Aubrey and her reasons for joining with Holtz and Angel's unconditional love for Connor. Wesley realizes that Angel would never harm his son, and finally feeling released from the prophecy, begins to laugh at the oddity that is life, and then a powerful earthquake begins to shake all of Los Angeles. The room goes up in flames as the gas stove explodes and beams come down from the ceiling. Angel rescues Connor and gets all three of them out of the room. A large cut on his forehead drips blood onto Connor's blanket, which is patterned with a blue sky and clouds. As the third of the portents comes true, Angel smiles and comments that if they had been trapped in there, he would have had a snack. Wesley, who a few seconds ago had dismissed the prophecy, is left more paranoid than ever.
