= Sleep Tight =

Sleep Tight may refer to:

== Music ==
- "Sleep Tight", a song by Sarah Brightman from the 1997 album Eden
- "Sleep Tight", a song by Celine Dion from the 2004 album Miracle
- "Sleep Tight", a song by Holly Humberstone
- "Sleep Tight", a song by Private Line
- "Sleep Tight", a song by Kill Hannah from the 2006 album Until There's Nothing Left of Us
- "Sleep Tight", a song by Big Bad Voodoo Daddy from the 1999 album This Beautiful Life

== Media ==
- Sleep Tight (film), a 2011 Spanish film
- "Sleep Tight" (Angel), a 2002 episode of the television series Angel
- "Sleep Tight", a storyline in the science fiction comedy webtoon series Live with Yourself!

== Literature ==
- Sleep Tight, a 1987 novel by Matthew Costello
- Sleep Tight, a 2014 novel by Rachel Abbott

== Other uses ==
- Sleep Tight, a horse, the 1958 winner of the Goodwood Handicap
