= That Vision Thing =

- Angel episode
- Episode no.: Season 3 Episode 2
- Directed by: Bill L. Norton
- Written by: Jeffrey Bell
- Production code: 3ADH03
- Original air date: October 1, 2001

Guest appearances
- Julie Benz as Darla; Andy Hallett as Lorne; Stephanie Romanov as Lilah Morgan; Daniel Dae Kim as Gavin Park; David Denman as Skip; Frank "Sotonoma" Salsedo as Shaman; Justin Shilton as Young Man; Ken Takemoto as Old Chinese Man; Alice Lo as Old Chinese Woman; Mitchell Gibney as Innocuous Man; Bob Sattler as Masked Man; Kal Penn as Brain Man

Episode chronology
← Previous "Heartthrob"	Next → "That Old Gang of Mine"
- Angel season 3

"That Vision-Thing" is the second episode of the third season of the American television series Angel. Written by Jeffrey Bell and directed by Bill L Norton, it was originally broadcast on October 1, 2001 on the WB network. In "That Vision-Thing", Cordelia's vision gift grows dangerous when it begins physically affecting her. She is on the verge of death when Angel discovers Wolfram & Hart lawyer Lilah Morgan is sending the painful visions to force Angel to free a man imprisoned in an alternate dimension.

== Plot ==
Wesley and Gunn eat take-out in the lobby and Fred eats her food under the table until Wesley convinces her to come out, while Cordelia waits for her next vision. Wolfram & Hart lawyer Gavin Park visits to inform them of the Hyperion Hotel's building code violations. After Gavin leaves, Cordelia gets a vision about a coin with a hole in it and a clawed beast. In the bathroom where she recovers, Cordelia informs Wesley through the door that there are five claws, but leaves out that there are claw marks across her stomach. Angel makes arrangements for Cordelia to be taken home by Fred. He knows Cordelia's visions are getting worse, but she refuses to acknowledge how bad they are. Wesley, Angel, and Gunn leave to find the coin, ending up at a herb shop owned by an elderly couple who turn demonic when they ask about the coin. The gang knock out the couple and Angel finds the coin around the neck of the elderly man.

Gavin informs Lilah that he's been moved into her department, and the two share bitter words about their approaches to dealing with Angel. At her apartment, Cordelia tries to force Fred to leave, but another violent vision leaves her with boils on her face. The whole gang meets at her place and she tries to describe her vision, but Angel is more interested in what's happening to her. They question why The Powers That Be would inflict pain on their messenger. Wesley sends Angel to find the key that goes with the coin while Lorne tries to question the Powers That Be about their actions. Cordelia fears losing her visions, but is persuaded to try anyway.

Lilah has a young man wearing a fez sign some papers before meditating on a table. Removing his hat, the man reveals a split skull and exposed brain. As a result of the man's mental efforts, Cordelia gets hit with a massive vision about fire that flings the Host across the room and burns her face and limbs. From his contact with Cordelia, the Host realizes the visions originate from Wolfram & Hart. Angel visits Lilah, who informs him that, unless he uses the key and coin to free an "unfairly imprisoned" man from a hell dimension, the physical effects of Cordy's visions will worsen.

Back at the hotel, Wesley tells Angel the coin and key are items of good nature, so those holding and associated with the objects are likely good as well. Wesley points out that rescuing this man is going against Angel's mission. Angel inserts the key into the coin's hole, which transports him to a hell dimension where he encounters a demon guard protecting a large fiery cube surrounding the prisoner, who is constantly aflame and in agony. The guard, Skip, is holding the prisoner in the fire with his will; he mentions that the prisoner is a particularly heinous monster who has earned such torment. Skip and Angel have a friendly conversation before they break into battle, where Skip is knocked unconscious, and the man is thus freed. Angel and the rest of the gang transport the prisoner to Lilah for the exchange. Lilah has Brain Man in the back of a limo work his magic to end Cordelia's suffering. A phone call to Fred at Cordelia's place confirms its success. The captive man is handed over to Wolfram & Hart, then Angel kills Brain Man by throwing a piece of re-bar through the limo's window and the man's skull. Lilah turns around to find Angel right in her face, threatening to kill her if she goes after Cordelia again. At the hotel, Cordelia makes food and coffee for Angel as thanks for his work and Angel convinces her the guilt she feels for what happened is unnecessary. He'll deal with Wolfram & Hart and the man he set free when it becomes necessary.

Meanwhile, in Central America, Darla visits a Shaman, asking for help to get rid of her baby. She reveals that the father is a vampire. Using some of her blood and herbs, he tries to determine the baby's form and how it could exist in a vampire's body. Unfortunately, what she is carrying is something no one can rid her of, and she resolves that her last option is to seek help from the baby's father.

== Production ==
=== Writing ===
"That Vision Thing" was the first Angel script written by Jeffrey Bell, who went on to both write and direct many subsequent episodes. Bell, who was recruited from The X-Files, included a reference to a creature he created for The X-Files episode "Alpha" called a "Wanshang Dhole" and came up with the demon jailer Skip, although he was originally called Bob. Played by actor David Denman, Skip was renamed as a tribute to producer Skip Schoolnik and quickly became a fan favorite. Executive producer David Greenwalt says, "People are insane for Skip. Not since Angel appeared on Buffy have I seen people go wild for a character like this." Greenwalt theorizes that their new special-effects shop Almost Human was partly responsible for the positive fan reaction. Makeup artist Robert Hall explains that Bell "described Skip enough for us to get a cool feeling about what he could look like, but he wasn't really restrictive." Hall and the rest of Almost Human created the character in less than a week. "It was a series of cool, happy accidents," Hall says. "We went so totally extreme with the design, and David went so deadpan with the dialogue, and Jeff went so out there with the scene, that it all came together, accidentally."

Actress Charisma Carpenter says that although the visions aren't usually difficult to portray, the physical manifestation of the visions in this episode were "a little bit more challenging than I had anticipated."

== Reception ==
The Futon Critic named it the 14th best episode of 2001, saying "The evolution of Cordelia has been one of the best things about this show as of late and this episode put out all the stops. Originally a Girl Friday to Angel, it's here we really see how far the character has come in the five years we've known her."
