= Sleep Tight (Angel) =

- Angel episode
- Episode no.: Season 3 Episode 16
- Directed by: Terrence O'Hara
- Written by: David Greenwalt
- Production code: 3ADH16
- Original air date: March 4, 2002

Guest appearances
- Andy Hallett as Lorne; Stephanie Romanov as Lilah Morgan; Laurel Holloman as Justine Cooper; Jack Conley as Sahjhan; Marina Benedict as Kim; Keith Szarabajka as Daniel Holtz; Jeff Denton as Lead Guitar; Jhaemi Willens as Drummer; J. Scott Shonka as Commando #1; Robert Forrest as Warrior #2

Episode chronology
← Previous "Loyalty"	Next → "Forgiving"
- Angel season 3

"Sleep Tight" is the 16th episode of the third season of the American television series Angel.

== Plot ==
Wesley has been studying the prophecies regarding Angel and Connor, and his findings have left him convinced that Angel will kill his son. Angel enters Wesley's office, strangely cheerful. He pours a glass of pig's blood, and the two watch Lorne listen to a female client sing. As she does, her face suddenly twists and becomes a horrific demon face before reverting to human form.

The woman, Kim, talks about the odd behavior and appearance of a band she'd been playing with. Angel continues to drink blood and draws attention with his unusual behavior. Fred and Wesley discover that Kim has just been infected by a demon and that a mystical medication can cure it. Kim tells the others about the demons and where they can be found and killed. Angel is enthusiastic about the fight, and Wesley sends the group out.

Justine teaches Holtz's minions how to kill vampires. She expresses worry to Holtz about killing the humans associated with Angel but eventually comes to believe that they deserve to die. Wesley again appears at Holtz's lair to talk about Connor.

Angel, Gunn, and Fred find and kill the demonic band, Angel fighting with atypical ferocity. Wesley talks with Holtz about ending the fight before it really begins. Holtz gives Wesley one day to deal with the problem of Angel killing Connor before Holtz gets involved. Angel and the others return to the hotel, and Angel starts chugging blood and shouting about how annoying Connor is. When he throws a glass of blood against the wall, Angel realizes something's very wrong with him.

Lorne notices Angel's obsession with the blood and suggests that it has been spiked. Wesley walks the streets until he finds that Justine has been following him. Wesley lectures her about the difference between Holtz and Angel. Fred studies the pig's blood under a microscope, but Angel already knows that it’s been spiked with Connor's blood, giving Angel a desire for more. Angel finds Lilah at the bar. Sahjhan appears, and although Angel doesn't recognize him from his past, he figures out that Sahjhan brought Holtz back. Sahjhan's upset that Angel doesn't remember him and promises retribution before disappearing.

Wesley packs Connor's bag as he prepares to take Connor. Lorne watches, concerned that Angel never mentioned Wesley taking Connor for the night. As Wesley hums a lullaby to Connor, Lorne reads his intentions and realizes he is going to abduct the child. Wesley chases Lorne into the office, knocking him unconscious. Angel returns and agrees to let Wesley take Connor for the night. He wonders where Lorne is, but Wesley explains that he went out.

Angel says his goodbyes to Connor and asks Wesley to investigate Sahjhan. Offering to do research at his own place, Wesley takes Connor and leaves the Hyperion on foot. Gunn and Fred offer to keep Angel company through the night without Connor. Holtz and several of his men then show up armed at the hotel. Holtz wants to know where Connor is, but since he's not there, he directs his men to attack but keep Angel alive. As a battle ensues, Lorne wakes up and uses a high-pitched note to debilitate some of the attackers. Holtz and some of his men retreat, and Lorne reveals that Wesley has been seeing Holtz and has kidnapped Connor.

Wesley packs his car and begins to leave with Connor, but a badly beaten Justine stumbles upon him and explains that Holtz turned his back on her. Justine slits Wesley's throat with a knife and takes Connor, driving away in Wesley's car. Angry because of his lost son and Wesley's betrayal, Angel lets loose on his co-workers, attacking Gunn. Fred breaks up the confrontation and suggests they focus on the real problem: Connor. Angel threatens some of Holtz's wounded minions until one reveals the location of Holtz's lair.

Lilah talks with some military types and then goes with them to Holtz's expected location. Angel takes out a couple of them and steals a truck so he can follow them. Holtz gets into the car with Justine and identifies himself and Justine to Connor as the baby's new parents.

Lilah's group, Angel, and Holtz all arrive at the bridge at the same time, and Sahjhan appears soon after. Lilah explains that she wants the baby alive despite her deal with Sahjhan. Angel tells Holtz to take Connor so that Connor will live. Sahjhan opens a dimensional rift to Quor'Toth — a very dark dimension — and explains that either the child dies or everyone is sucked into the portal. In the interest of survival, Holtz runs with Connor into the rift. Angel tries to follow, but he's thrown back and the rift is mended. The others leave, and a devastated Angel is left lying on the ground, grieving over his lost son.

== Reception ==
Noel Murray, writing in The A.V. Club praised the episode, stating "This is the kind of storytelling that TV frequently does better than any other medium (outside of maybe comic books): the kind where multiple long-range plots come to a head and everything goes sour all at once." Neil Wilkes of Digital Spy praised the "wickedly executed climax" which fans would find "Angel at its best."
