= Forgiving (Angel) =

- Angel episode
- Episode no.: Season 3 Episode 17
- Directed by: Turi Meyer
- Written by: Jeffrey Bell
- Production code: 3ADH17
- Original air date: April 15, 2002

Guest appearances
- John Rubinstein as Linwood Murrow; Andy Hallett as Lorne; Laurel Holloman as Justine Cooper; Stephanie Romanov as Lilah Morgan; Jack Conley as Sahjhan; Kay Panabaker as Girl; Kenneth Dolin as Bum; Tripp Pickell as Holtzian; Sean Mahon as Truck Driver

Episode chronology
← Previous "Sleep Tight"	Next → "Double or Nothing"
- Angel season 3

"Forgiving" is the 17th episode of the third season of the American television series Angel.

== Plot synopsis ==
Shortly after Daniel Holtz's abduction of baby Connor to the Hell dimension of Quor'Toth, Fred, Gunn and Lorne try to sort out why Wesley betrayed them and how to get Connor back.

Angel is not interested in sympathy or pity, however, and is already mentally unstable and vengeful due to his loss, in behaviors that akin to that of his soulless alter-ego Angelus and Holtz's. When it proves impossible to open a portal to Quor'Toth, he abducts Linwood, a lawyer with Wolfram & Hart, to force him to tell where Sahjhan is and how to open a dimensional rift to Quor'Toth. In an attempt to open a rift, Angel and Lilah use dark magic; this opens a tear in the fabric of reality.

Sahjhan is revealed to have been a demon knight who had been made non-corporeal by an ancient curse hundreds of years ago, and who is now able to wander through time at will. When Sahjhan uncovered a prophecy that he would be killed by ‘the one sired by a vampire with a soul’ he brought vampire hunter and Angel's old nemesis Daniel Holtz to the 21st century to kill Angel, Darla and the baby. However, Holtz did not follow Sahjhan's plan, so Sahjhan, using his time-shifting abilities, altered the prophecy to trick Wesley into believing that Angel would kill Connor.

In the final confrontation, Angel makes Sahjhan corporeal once again to fight him, but discovers that he is more physically powerful than any of them had anticipated. Justine ends up trapping him in a special urn that Holtz had obtained previously.

Wesley is later found and taken to a hospital. Angel pays him a visit, saying he would never kill his own son. He tells Wesley it's important that he knows it's not Angelus talking, but Angel. When Wesley nods, Angel simply says "good" then suddenly grabs a pillow and tries to smother Wesley with it. Filled with fury and rage, Angel screams that he will never forgive his former friend, and that he'll kill him for stealing his son. An alarm is tripped, and Angel is dragged away by Gunn and some orderlies. As he is pulled away, Angel maniacally screams death threats at Wesley, screaming:"You're a dead man, Pryce! You're dead! Dead!"
