= Billy (Angel) =

- Angel episode
- Episode no.: Season 3 Episode 6
- Directed by: David Grossman
- Written by: Tim Minear; Jeffrey Bell
- Production code: 3ADH06
- Original air date: October 29, 2001

Guest appearances
- Stephanie Romanov as Lilah Morgan; Daniel Dae Kim as Gavin Park; Justin Shilton as Billy Blim; Richard Livingston as Congressman Nathan Blim; Jennifer Brooke as Clerk; Cheri Rae Russell as Female Officer; Gwen McGee as Detective; Kristoffer Polaha as Dylan; Rey Gallegos as Sanchez; Charlie Parker as Guy; Joy Lang as Amber; Timothy McNeil as Cab Driver

Episode chronology
| ← Previous "Fredless" | Next → "Offspring" |
- Angel season 3

"Billy" is the 6th episode of the third season of the American television series Angel. Written by Tim Minear and Jeffrey Bell and directed by David Grossman, it was originally broadcast on October 29, 2001 on the WB television network. In this episode, Angel investigates a wave of violence against women throughout Los Angeles, caused by Billy's ability to infect men with murderous misogyny. Cordelia seeks the aid of Lilah, who is a victim of Billy’s power, while Fred finds herself in danger from an infected Wesley.

== Plot ==
Angel teaches Cordelia how to sword fight so that she can defend herself if Angel isn't there to protect her. Lilah finds Billy, the man Angel was forced to rescue from hell, in her office talking with Gavin Park. Lilah tells Gavin to stay away from her clients. Gavin attacks her, smashing her head into a glass case and strangling her.

Cordelia has a vision of a woman being beaten by her husband in a convenience store. Wesley gets surveillance photos from the crime, in which they spot Billy. Wesley, Gunn, and Angel track down Billy; however, the police arrive first to take Billy into custody for phoning in a tip on the location of a murder victim. Lilah reveals that Billy's touch turns men into vicious misogynists. Wesley and Fred examine Billy's blood cells through the microscope and observes that his power is in his blood, saliva, and sweat. They are affected by Billy's power and begin fighting.

Angel tracks Billy's last location to a party at his cousin's house, where he discovers that Billy's entire family is aware of his situation and want him gone. Cordelia finds Billy waiting for a private plane at the airport. He's not interested in talking with her, and she debilitates him with a stun gun to his groin. Angel arrives to help Cordelia and Billy touches Angel's face, but is unaffected, having long since lost the capacity to feel hatred. As Angel and Billy fight, Lilah shoots Billy dead before Cordelia can get a clear shot with her crossbow.

Fred forgives Wesley for the fight. Wesley, consumed with guilt, worries that Billy brought out something that was already inside him deep down, he doesn't know who he is or how to return to life as it was before.

== Production ==
Dylan Blim invokes John F. Kennedy Jr. who was a member of the family himself—but adamantly disliked the conduct of relatives. Dylan is aware that Angel is a vampire with the potential to kill Billy but still invites him into the family compound. Kennedy had also openly criticized relatives engaging in 'bad behavior'.

== Reception ==
Stephanie Romanov says the ending to this episode was one of her "favorite Lilah moments. It was the only time Lilah was a hero."

DVD Verdict called this episode a The Shining homage with an "unsubtle metaphor" that "misogyny is BAD."

The Futon Critic named it the 36th best episode of 2001, saying "No show pushes as many buttons at the same time as this one."

In 2021, Paste named the episode the most terrifying episode of the Buffyverse, writing "When it comes to horror, things like jumpscares, bodies falling out of closets, or other similar genre staples are the kind that frighten you for a moment, maybe two, and then they're gone. Billy's horror operates from the opposite direction, capitalizing on quiet moments and the slow burn of it all: the haunted look in Lilah's eyes as she steps out of the shadows to reveal her face mottled with bruises, or the cruelty in Wesley's voice as he taunts and terrorizes Fred. It's a kind of unsettling, skin-crawling horror that will sit with you long after the credits have rolled."
