= Raymond H. Geist =

American diplomat (1885–1955)

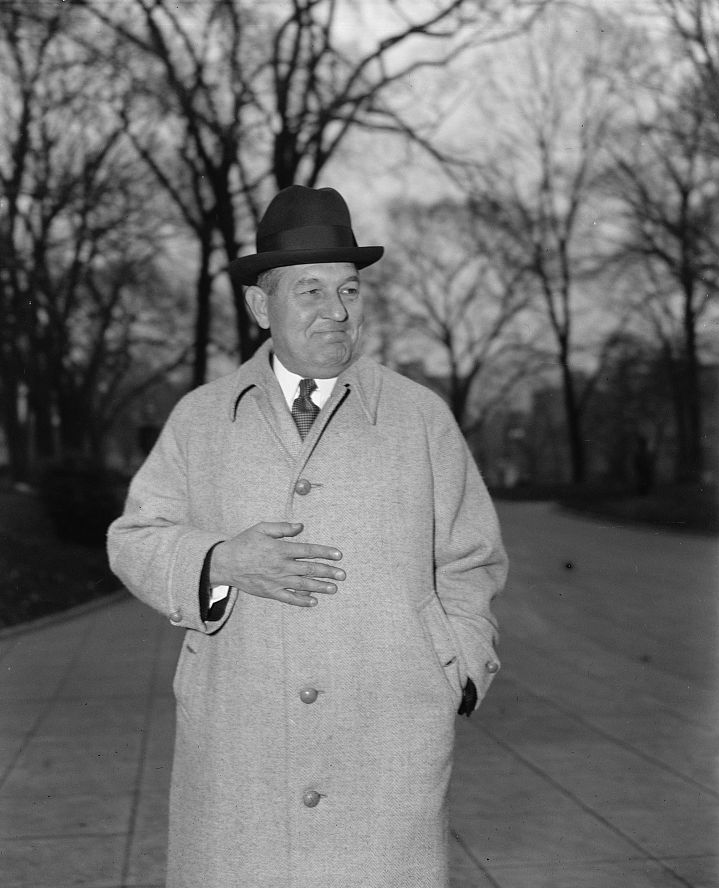
- Born: Raymond Herman Geist; August 19, 1885; Cleveland, Ohio, United States
- Died: February 28, 1955 (aged 69); Los Angeles, California, United States
- Education: Harvard University
- Occupations: American Consul and First Secretary of the United States embassy in Berlin

Raymond Herman Geist (August 19, 1885 – February 28, 1955) was the American Consul and First Secretary of the United States embassy in Berlin from 1929 to 1939. Geist has been recognized as Diplomat Savior by the International Raoul Wallenberg Foundation, which advocates for the recognition of Holocaust rescuers. However, one academic researcher has asserted that Geist largely acted to block the granting of visas to Jewish immigrants between 1933 and 1939, in line with the policy adopted by U.S. Foreign Service Officers in Germany at the time. A 2019 book about Geist found that "Geist was doing what he could (which, as a consular officer, was not much) to liberalize America's scandalously tight visa regime for Jewish refugees, help as many German Jews as possible."

== Life ==
Geist was born in Cleveland, Ohio in 1885. He was student at Oberlin College from 1906 to 1909, and received a bachelor's degree from Western Reserve university in 1910. He received a master's degree in 1916 and a Ph.D. degree in 1918, both from Harvard University. Geist died in Los Angeles on February 28, 1955. Geist was also a closeted gay man.

== Diplomatic career ==
In 1921 he entered the United States Foreign Service, serving first in Buenos Aires, and then in Montevideo and Alexandria before being posted to Berlin in 1928.

Midway through his career at the Berlin consulate, Geist was directed to refuse a visa for Albert Einstein, based on allegations of Einstein being an active communist. The refusal caused an outcry in the United States and was later rescinded.

While in Berlin, Geist cultivated a number of high-level contacts within the Nazi party, including personal contacts with Heinrich Himmler and Reinhard Heydrich. Geist notified his superiors on several occasions of the conditions for Jews in Germany. Following Kristallnacht, he warned the Assistant Secretary of State George S. Messersmith in a private letter in late 1938 that Jews in Germany were being "condemned to death". The next year, in April 1939, he reported Franz Halder telling him that the German Army feared that Hitler would throw them into a war for which Germany was unprepared. In May, he repeated his warning about the Jews, saying they would be doomed if aggressive action was not taken to rescue them.

Geist has been credited with helping Jews and anti-Nazis to emigrate from Germany during 1938–1939, including Jews and others who were under imminent threat of deportation to concentration camps. However, between 1933 and 1939 the four U.S. Foreign Service Officers in Germany, including Geist, denied 75% of visa requests by German Jews and filled only 40% of immigration quotas from Germany, in a concerted effort to limit Jewish immigration. As late as April 1939, Geist wrote in a letter to a colleague that the consulate should continue limiting the issuance of visas to German Jewish applicants. The United States Holocaust Memorial Museum seems to take issue with that view of Geist, as they describe Geist as "responsible for issuing tens of thousands of visas to German Jews fleeing Nazi persecution. He became convinced that Nazi officials were pursuing a goal of 'annihilation of the Jews,' but his warnings were largely ignored in Washington. ... By juggling the number of visas available to various consulates, he was able to make full use of the 27,370 slots in the quota for the first time during the Nazi era in the fiscal year 1938–39."

Geist returned to the United States on October 9, 1939, several weeks after the outbreak of World War II. Following the war, Geist testified and provided an affidavit at Nuremberg on his knowledge of Nazi operations.

== Awards ==
Geist received the Commander's Cross of the Order of Merit from the German Federal Republic in 1954.

== Depictions in media ==
Geist was portrayed by actor Vincent Kartheiser in Genius, the 2017 National Geographic TV series on Einstein's life, where Geist is noted for "having issued over 50,000 US visas during his tenure to Jews escaping Nazi persecution in Germany" before the credits for Episode 8, though some, such as American historian Rafael Medoff, questioned the accuracy of the series' portrayal of Geist with respect to both his direct involvement with Einstein and his subsequent issuing of visas for Jewish refugees.
