= Jeffrey Bell =

American writer/producer

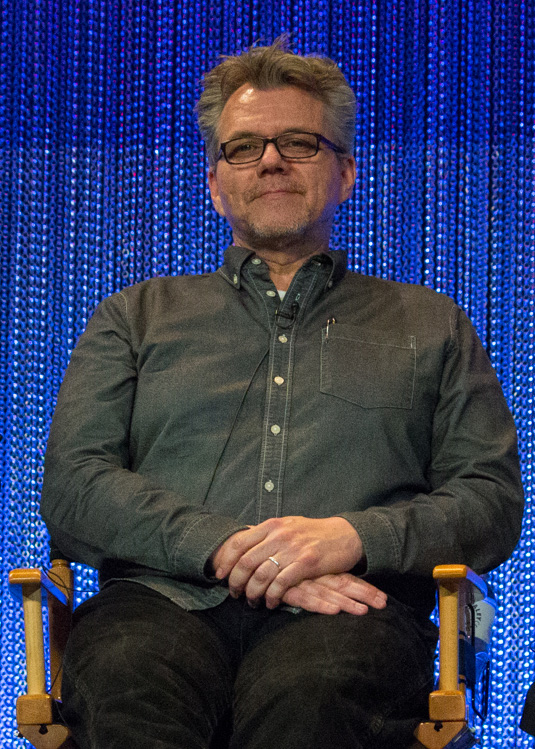
- Bell at PaleyFest 2014
- Born: Indiana, U.S.
- Education: University of Cincinnati
- Alma mater: UCLA School of Theater, Film and Television (MFA 1990)
- Occupations: Television writer and producer
- Writing career
- Notable work: Angel

Jeffrey Jackson Bell is an American writer and producer best known for his work on television. He began his career writing for The X-Files, where he stayed for three seasons, then became a writer/director/producer on Angel, becoming its showrunner for the final two seasons.

He served as executive producer on the pilot episode for the V remake, his first project in a 2009–2010 deal with Warner Bros. Television. From 2013 until 2020, Bell served as a co-showrunner and writer of the Marvel Television series Agents of S.H.I.E.L.D.

== Personal life ==
Bell was born in Indiana, studied design and photography at the University of Cincinnati, then moved to California, receiving MFA from the UCLA School of Theater, Film and Television in 1990. His 20-minute MFA thesis film, Radio Inside, was adapted into a feature film of the same name starring Elisabeth Shue and William McNamara and released in 1994.

Bell is a visiting assistant professor for the UCLA Producers Program.

== Episodes written ==
The following is a partial list of television episodes written by Bell.

=== The X-Files ===
- 6.08 "The Rain King (writer)
- 6.16 "Alpha (writer)
- 7.06 "The Goldberg Variation (writer)
- 7.09 "Signs and Wonders (writer)
- 8.09 "Salvage (writer)

=== Angel ===
- 3.02 "That Vision Thing (writer)
- 3.06 "Billy (co-writer)
- 3.08 "Quickening (writer)
- 3.14 "Couplet (co-writer)
- 3.17 "Forgiving (writer)
- 3.20 "A New World (writer)
- 4.04 "Slouching Toward Bethlehem (writer)
- 4.08 "Habeas Corpses (writer)
- 4.12 "Calvary (co-writer)
- 4.16 "Players (co-writer)
- 4.19 "The Magic Bullet (writer/director)
- 5.06 "The Cautionary Tale of Numero Cinco (writer/director)
- 5.22 "Not Fade Away (co-writer/director)

=== Alias ===
- 4.04 "Ice (writer/director)
- 4.12 "The Orphan (co-writer)
- 4.20 "The Descent (writer/director)
- 5.06 "Solo (writer/director)

=== Day Break ===
- 1.08 "What If He's Not Alone? (writer)
- 1.12 "What If She's the Key? (writer)

=== Harper's Island ===
- 1.02 "Crackle (writer)
- 1.07 "Thrack, Splat, Sizzle (writer)
- 1.12 "Sigh (writer)

=== Spartacus: War of the Damned ===
- 3.09 "The Dead and the Dying (writer)

=== The Protector ===
- 1.01 "Pilot (writer)
- 1.04 "Spoons (writer)
- 1.13 "Safe (writer)

=== Agents of S.H.I.E.L.D. ===
- 1.02 "0-8-4 (writer)
- 1.04 "Eye Spy (writer)
- 1.14 "T.A.H.I.T.I. (writer)
- 1.21 "Ragtag (writer)
- 2.10 "What They Become (writer)
- 2.21 "S.O.S. Part 1 (writer)
- 3.10 "Maveth (writer)
- 4.06 "The Good Samaritan (writer)
- 4.22 "World's End (writer)
- 5.12 "The Real Deal (co-writer)
- 6.08 "Collision Course (Part I) (co-writer)
- 7.12 "The End Is at Hand (writer)
