= Matthew James (actor) =

American TV and film actor (born 1973)

- Born: 1973 (age 51–52); Long Island, New York, U.S.
- Occupation: Actor
- Height: 5 ft 10 in (1.78 m)

Matthew James (born 1973) is an American TV and film actor. He appeared in Jay and Silent Bob Strike Back and also portrayed Merl in the TV show Angel. He played a minor, character role in the 5th episode of television show The Good Guys entitled "$3.52".
