= Vincent Kartheiser =

American actor (born 1979)

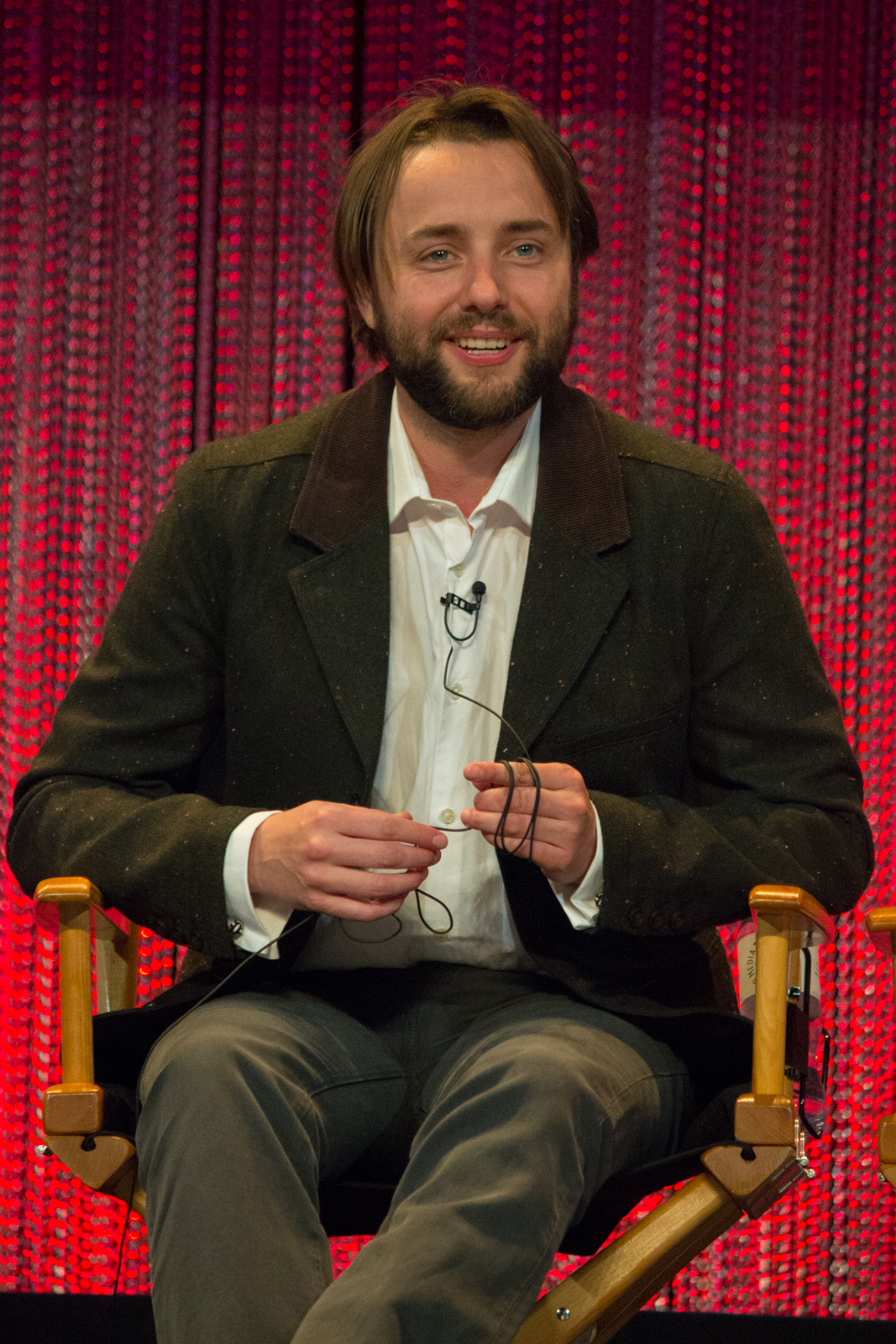
- Kartheiser in 2014
- Born: Vincent Paul Kartheiser; May 5, 1979 (age 47); Minneapolis, Minnesota, U.S.
- Occupation: Actor
- Years active: 1993–present
- Spouse: Alexis Bledel (m. 2014; div. 2022)
- Children: 1

Vincent Paul Kartheiser (born May 5, 1979) is an American actor. He gained acclaim for his role as Pete Campbell on the AMC drama series Mad Men from 2007 to 2015. He had starring roles in films such as Alaska (1996), Masterminds (1997), and Another Day in Paradise (1998). Kartheiser also played Connor on The WB television series Angel and Dr. Jonathan Crane in the third season of the HBO series Titans. For his role as William Bradford in Saints & Strangers he was nominated for the Critics' Choice Television Award for Best Actor in a Miniseries or Movie.

== Early life ==
Kartheiser was born in Minneapolis, Minnesota, the son of Janet Marie (née Gruyé), who ran a nursery, and James Ralph Kartheiser, who sold construction equipment.

The youngest of six children, he has four sisters, Andrea, Colette, Elise and Theresa, and a brother, Nathan. He is of Luxembourgish, German, and to an extent Polish, Finnish, and Swedish ancestry. At age 7, he played Tiny Tim in A Christmas Carol at Guthrie Theater. At 11, he played Tommy in a national touring production of Pippi Longstocking.

== Career ==
Some of Kartheiser's first acting experiences were on stage of Children's Theatre Company in Minneapolis, including roles in Pippi Longstocking, Our Town, Dr. Seuss' The 500 Hats of Bartholomew Cubbins, and Rebecca of Sunnybrook Farm.

He made his screen debut with a bit role in the film Untamed Heart (1993). Kartheiser found himself cast in mostly family fare, including The Indian in the Cupboard (1995) and a starring role in the film Alaska (1996). The film led to Kartheiser getting the lead role in Masterminds the following year.

He was next cast as Bobby, a drug-addicted criminal in Larry Clark's Another Day in Paradise. He had two explicit sex scenes with Natasha Gregson, one of which was cut from the film in order to avoid an NC-17 rating. The film earned the young actor significant accolades, and he went on to appear in Strike! (later retitled All I Wanna Do) and Crime and Punishment in Suburbia.

Screened at the 2000 Sundance Film Festival, Crime and Punishment in Suburbia was a moody, updated take on Dostoyevsky's Crime and Punishment, set in a modern high school. Kartheiser co-starred on the supernatural drama series Angel in 2002, playing Connor, the son of the title character Angel, appearing in a total of 28 episodes. Returning to film work, Kartheiser starred in the well-received coming-of-age drama Dandelion, which was shown at the 2004 Sundance Film Festival.

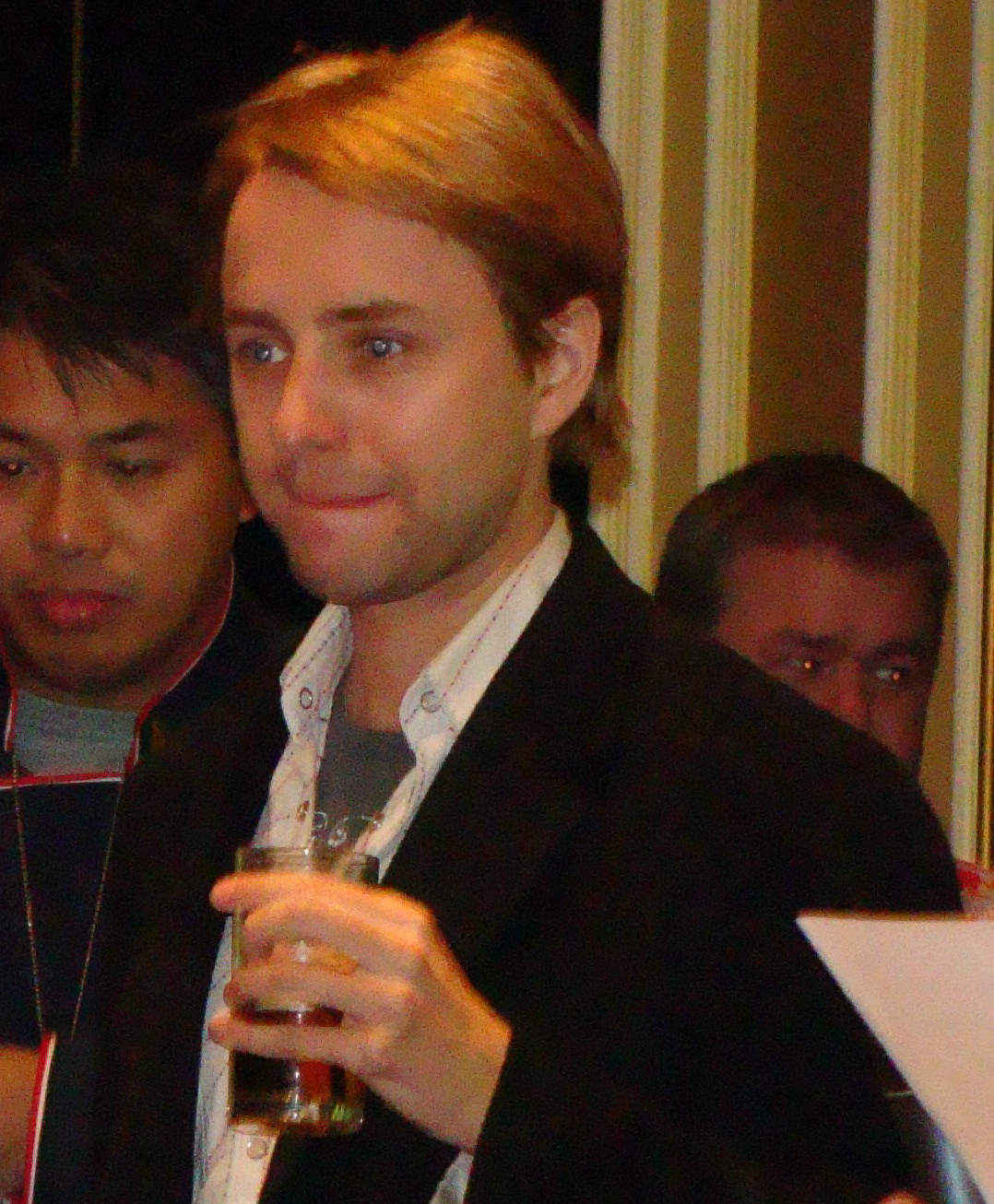
Kartheiser in 2009

Kartheiser played the role of ambitious young ad man Pete Campbell in the AMC television series Mad Men (2007–2015). Along with the rest of the show's cast, Kartheiser won the Screen Actors Guild Award for Outstanding Performance by an Ensemble in a Drama Series in 2009 and 2010.

Kartheiser filmed his role as Fielding in the BBC's two-part adaptation of Martin Amis' novel Money in the winter of 2009. The adaptation began airing on BBC Two on May 23, 2010. In 2011, he appeared in In Time and provided a voice for Rango.

Kartheiser's short film, Fruit of Labor, made its Orange County debut at the Newport Beach Film Festival in April 2013. In the summer of 2013, he returned to his theatrical roots in Minneapolis to portray Mr. Darcy in an adaptation of Pride and Prejudice at the Guthrie Theater.

In 2021, Kartheiser appeared in season three of Titans as Jonathan Crane. Kartheiser was the subject of at least two complaints and two internal investigations by Warner Bros Television over allegations of disruptive, juvenile behavior and inappropriate comments on set. The first investigation concluded that Kartheiser's behavior warranted corrective action. The second complaint was received several weeks later and resulted in the studio assigning a representative to monitor Kartheiser on set. There were reportedly other complaints of alleged misconduct which were investigated but not corroborated. Kartheiser denied the allegations, with his spokesperson stating, "Warner Bros investigated this matter and made clear to Mr. Kartheiser its expectations for behavior on the set, and he agreed to comply with their directives."

== Personal life ==
Kartheiser dated The Hairy Bird co-star Rachael Leigh Cook for four months in 1998. He began dating Mad Men co-star Alexis Bledel in mid-2012. He and Bledel announced their engagement in March 2013, and were married in California in June 2014. They have one son, born in 2015. The couple sold their Brooklyn duplex penthouse for $1.32 million in May 2016. On August 10, 2022, Kartheiser filed for divorce from Bledel; the divorce was finalized on August 30.

In a 2010 interview with The Observer, Kartheiser revealed that he eschewed the extravagant lifestyle of a Hollywood celebrity in favor of simple living.

== Filmography ==
=== Film ===
Year	Title	Role	Notes
1993	Untamed Heart	Orphan Boy	
1994	Little Big League	James	
1994	Heaven Sent	Eddie Chandler	
1995	The Indian in the Cupboard	Gillon	
1996	Alaska	Sean Barnes	
1997	Masterminds	Ozzie Paxton	
1998	Another Day in Paradise	Bobbie	
1998	All I Wanna Do/Strike!	Snake – Flat Critter	
2000	Crime and Punishment in Suburbia	Vincent	
2000	Preston Tylk	Dillon	
2000	Ricky 6	Ricky Cowen	
2000	Luckytown	Colonel	
2001	The Unsaid	Thomas Caffey	
2004	Dandelion	Mason Mullich	
2005	Shakespeare's Sonnets	Sebastian	Short film
2006	Alpha Dog	Pick Giaimo	
2006	Waning Moon	Michael	Short film
2007	Killing Zelda Sparks	Craig Blackshear	
2010	Elektra Luxx	Jimmy	
2011	Rango	Ezekiel / Lasso Rodent (voice)	
2011	In Time	Philippe Weis	
2011	Fruit of Labor	Alfred	Short film
2012	Cussing in the Workplace	Jack	Short film
2014	Beach Pillows	Nick	
2014	Red Knot	Peter Harrison	
2015	Winter Light	Samuel	Short film
2015	Day Out of Days	Tark	
2016	The Second Sound Barrier	Charles Michael Fortitude as The Artist	Short film
2016	A Kind of Murder	Detective Lawrence Corby	
2017	The Most Hated Woman in America	William J. Murray III	
2017	My Friend Dahmer	Dr. Matthews	
2018	Most Likely to Murder	Lowell	
2019	American Hangman	Henry David Cole	
2019	Crypto	Ted Patterson	
2020	The Social Dilemma	A.I.	
2021	Ultrasound	Glen	
2025	Unholy Communion	Paul	
2026	Go On	Zac	
TBA	Green River Killer		

=== Television ===
Year	Title	Role	Notes
1994	Sweet Justice	Nicholas	Episode: "Story of My Life"
1999	ER	Jesse Keenan	Episode: "Truth & Consequences"
2002–2004	Angel	Connor	28 episodes
2007–2015	Mad Men	Pete Campbell	Main role 87 episodes
2010	American Experience	Thomas Nickerson (voice)	Episode: "Into the Deep: America, Whaling, & the World"
2010	Money	Fielding Goodney	2 episodes
2011	The Cleveland Show	(voice)	Episode: "Like a Boss"
2013	Axe Cop	Bat Warthog Man (voice)	2 episodes
2013–2015	High School USA!	Marsh Merriwether (voice)	12 episodes
2015	Inside Amy Schumer	Juror #4	Episode: "12 Angry Men Inside Amy Schumer"
2015	Saints & Strangers	William Bradford	2 episodes
2016	Casual	Jordan Anderson	7 episodes
2017	Genius	Raymond H. Geist	2 episodes
2018	The Path	Congressman Buck Harbaugh	4 episodes
2018–2020	Das Boot	Samuel Greenwood	10 episodes
2019	Proven Innocent	Bodie Quick	13 episodes
2019	The OA	Pierre Ruskin	4 episodes
2019–2020	Law & Order: Special Victims Unit	Steve Getz	2 episodes
2021	Titans	Dr. Jonathan Crane	Main (season 3)
2026	Law & Order	Chuck Klein	Episode: "Ghost in the Machine"

=== Theatre ===
Year	Title	Role	Playwright	Venue	Ref.
2012	The Death of the Novel	Sebastian	Jonathan Marc Feldman	San Jose Repertory Theatre	
2013	Pride and Prejudice	Mr. Darcy	Jane Austen	The Guthrie Theater, Minneapolis	
2014	Billy & Ray	Billy Wilder	Mike Bencivenga	Vineyard Theatre, Off-Broadway	

=== Video game ===
Year	Title	Role
2011	L.A. Noire	Walter Clemens (voice)

== Awards and nominations ==
Year	Association	Category	Project	Result	Ref.
1997	Young Artist Award	Best Lead Young Actor in a Feature Film	Alaska	Nominated	
2007	Screen Actors Guild Awards	Outstanding Ensemble in a Drama Series	Mad Men (Season 1)	Nominated	
2008	Screen Actors Guild Awards	Outstanding Ensemble in a Drama Series	Mad Men (Season 2)	Won	
2009	Screen Actors Guild Awards	Outstanding Ensemble in a Drama Series	Mad Men (Season 3)	Won	
2010	Screen Actors Guild Awards	Outstanding Ensemble in a Drama Series	Mad Men (Season 4)	Nominated	
2012	Screen Actors Guild Awards	Outstanding Ensemble in a Drama Series	Mad Men (Season 5)	Nominated	
2015	Screen Actors Guild Awards	Outstanding Ensemble in a Drama Series	Mad Men (Season 7)	Nominated	
2016	Critics' Choice Television Awards	Best Actor in a Miniseries or Movie	Saints & Strangers	Nominated	
