= Mark Lutz (actor) =

Canadian actor (born 1970)

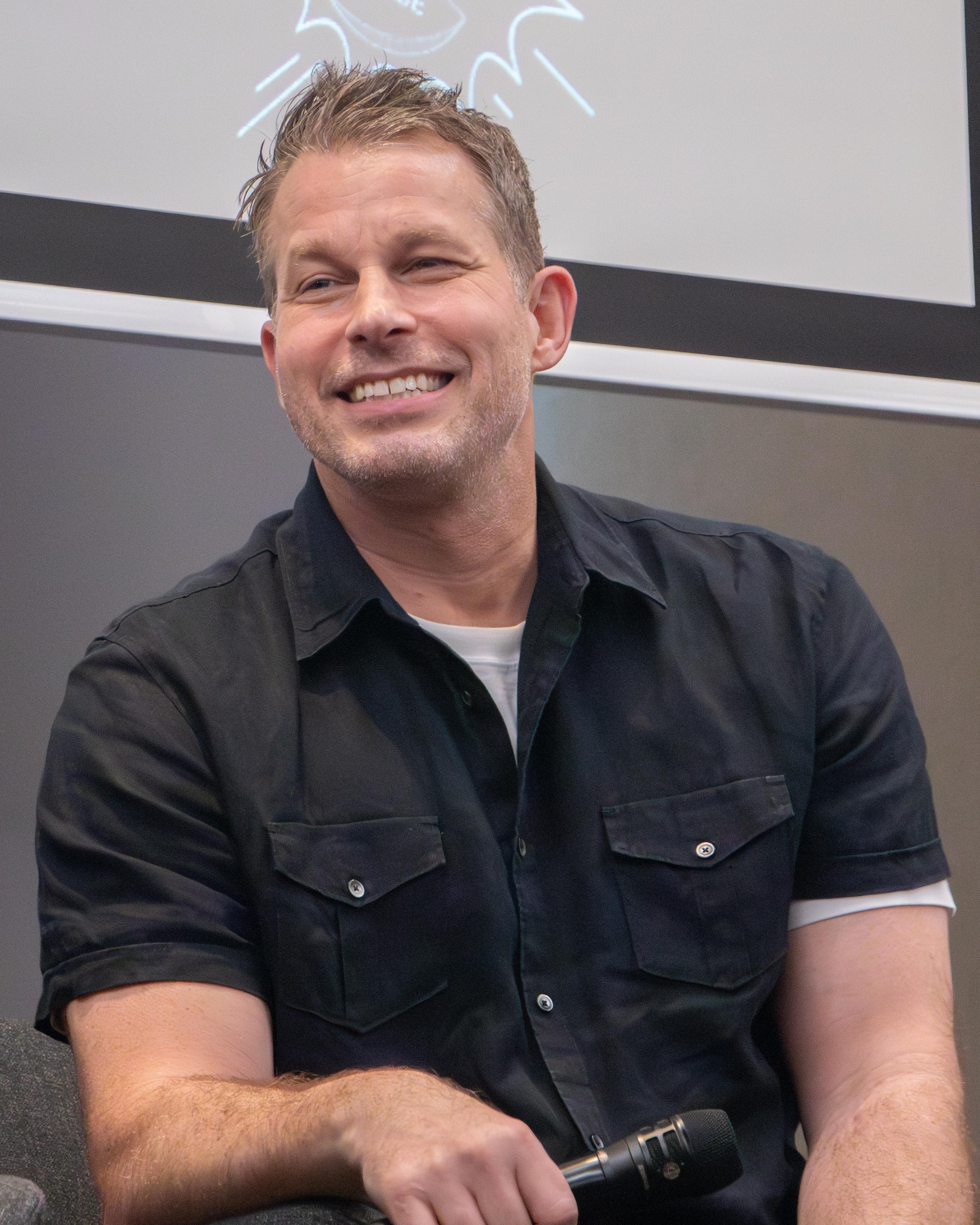
- Mark Lutz at the Whispers From The Hellmouth Convention, April 2024 (Paris).
- Born: Mark Douglas Lutz
- Education: University of Guelph (BA)
- Occupation: Actor
- Years active: 1994–present

Mark Douglas Lutz is a Canadian actor, who is best known for playing Groosalugg in the television series Angel and for writing and starring in Victor, a two-hour film on the life and death of Victor Davis.

He also guest starred in Friends.

== Early life and education ==
At the age of 13, he moved to Hong Kong and he lived there for five years before moving to North York, Ontario. His swimming career was highlighted by setting Ontario High School records and swimming internationally for his country, including World Cups and the Olympic trials. Lutz earned a Bachelor of Arts degree in political science from the University of Guelph.

== Career ==
Lutz starred in a biopic about the late Canadian Olympic swimmer Victor Davis. As well as starring in it, he also wrote the script and co-produced it. Victor was filmed in 2007 and was telecast on January 13, 2008, on CBC Television and was the highest rated movie-of-the-week in ten years for the network.

Lutz also appeared as the Groosalugg "Groo" on the TV series Angel. He also played James on Ghost Whisperer.

== Filmography ==
=== Film ===
Year	Title	Role	Notes
1996	Specimen	Blaine Masterson	
1997	Inner Action	Marcus	
1999	Dick	Hunky Secret Service Man	
2002	Interstate 60: Episodes of the Road	Frank	
2006	A Lobster Tale	Eddie Johnson	
2009	Bitch Slap	Deiter von Vondervon	
2013	E.M.S.	Jake Thor	Also writer and producer
2018	Anon	Bekerman	Uncredited

=== Television ===
Year	Title	Role	Notes
1994	Boogies Diner	Clark	Episode: "The Wrong Man"
1995	Due South	RCMP Officer Graham	Episode: "The Man Who Knew Too Little"
1995	The Hardy Boys	Chet Morton	Episode: "The Curse"
1996	Side Effects	Dr. David Brown	Episode: "You Can Run"
1996	A Brother's Promise: The Dan Jansen Story	Mike Jansen	Television film
1997	Rescuers: Stories of Courage: Two Women	Soldier #1	Television film
1997	The Third Twin	Adam Sloane	Television film
1997	Face Down	Face Down	Television film
1998	Nothing Too Good for a Cowboy	Hal	Television film
1998	Once a Thief	Bizarro Mac	Episode: "The Last Temptation of Vic"
1998	PSI Factor: Chronicles of the Paranormal	Bobby Fossett	Episode: "The Kiss"
1998	Once a Thief: Family Business	Bizarro Mac	Television film
1998–1999	Power Play	Jukka Branny-Acke	13 episodes
1999	La Femme Nikita	McDaniel	Episode: "Third Party Ripoff"
1999	Relic Hunter	Frank Newhouse	Episode: "Diamond in the Rough"
1999	Earth: Final Conflict	Vernon Getz	Episode: "Pad'ar"
1999	External Affairs	Mahavolitch	Television film
1999	A Saintly Switch	Morton Wagner	Television film
2000	The Zack Files	Jerome	Episode: "Crypt Seeker"
2000	Harry's Case	Tony Westwood	Television film
2001	Queer as Folk	Steve	Episode: "Surprise!"
2001	Rough Air: Danger on Flight 534	Ty Conner	Television film
2001	The Facts of Life Reunion	Harper Jason	Television film
2001	Mutant X	Eric Tanner	Episode: "Lit Fuse"
2001, 2002	Doc	Kevin Drucker	2 episodes
2001–2002	Angel	The Groosalugg	9 episodes
2002	ER	Randall	Episode: "It's All in Your Head"
2002	Friends	Mona's Date	Episode: "The One with the Tea Leaves"
2006	Twins	Trevor	Episode: "Blonde Ambition"
2006	What About Brian	Mitchell Peidmont	Episode: "Moving Day"
2008	Victor	Victor Davis	Television film; also writer and producer
2010	Ghost Whisperer: The Other Side	James Tyler	8 episodes
2012	Flashpoint	Ronnie Birch	2 episodes
2013	Air Emergency	Michael Marx	Episode: "Catastrophe at O'Hare"
2013	King & Maxwell	Tom Taylor	Episode: "Pilot"
2013	Finding Christmas	Sean Tucker	Television film
2013	Transporter: The Series	Dan Cleef	3 episodes
2015	Asteroid: Final Impact	Steve Thomas	Television film
2019	Departure	Gavin Malley	4 episodes
2020	Killer Prom	Tony Wilson	Television film
