= List of Angel characters =

This article lists the major and recurring fictional characters created by Joss Whedon and the writers of Mutant Enemy for the television program, Angel. For a more in-depth look at some of the minor characters on the show, please see the list of minor Angel characters. For the characters of Angel's parent show Buffy the Vampire Slayer, please see list of Buffy the Vampire Slayer characters and list of minor Buffy the Vampire Slayer characters.

== Cast overview ==
=== Main ===
Actor	Character	Count	Seasons				
Actor	Character	Count	1	2	3	4	5
David Boreanaz	Angel	110	Main	Main	Main	Main	Main
Charisma Carpenter	Cordelia Chase	86	Main	Main	Main	Main	Guest
Glenn Quinn	Allen Francis Doyle	9	Main (Note: Glenn Quinn is only credited through the first ten episodes of season 1.)				
Alexis Denisof	Wesley Wyndam-Pryce	100	Main (Note: Alexis Denisof first guest stars in the season 1 episode, "Parting Gifts", before joining the main cast the following episode, "Somnambulist".)	Main	Main	Main	Main
J. August Richards	Charles Gunn	91	Recurring	Main	Main	Main	Main
Amy Acker	Fred Burkle / Illyria (Note: Amy Acker portrays Illyria in season 5, episodes 15–22.)	70		Recurring	Main	Main	Main
Vincent Kartheiser	Connor	28			Recurring	Main	Guest
Andy Hallett	Lorne	76		Recurring	Recurring	Main (Note: Andy Hallett joins the main cast beginning with season 4, episode 14 ("Release").)	Main
James Marsters	Spike	24	Guest	Guest			Main
Mercedes McNab	Harmony Kendall	17		Guest			Main (Note: Mercedes McNab joins the main cast beginning with season 5, episode 17 ("Underneath").)

=== Recurring ===
Actor	Character	Count	Seasons				
Actor	Character	Count	1	2	3	4	5
Christian Kane	Lindsey McDonald	19	Recurring	Recurring			Recurring
Elisabeth Röhm	Kate Lockley	15	Recurring	Recurring			
Thomas Burr	Lee Mercer	4	Recurring				
Carey Cannon	Female Oracle	3	Recurring				
Randall Slavin	Male Oracle	3	Recurring				
Julie Benz	Darla	20	Recurring	Recurring	Recurring	Guest	Guest
Stephanie Romanov	Lilah Morgan	35	Recurring	Recurring	Recurring	Recurring	
Matthew James	Merl	6		Recurring	Guest		
Sam Anderson	Holland Manners	8	Guest	Recurring			
Juliet Landau	Drusilla	7		Recurring			Guest
Brigid Brannagh	Virginia Bryce	4		Recurring			
Gerry Becker	Nathan Reed	3		Recurring			
Marie Chambers	Francine Sharp	3		Recurring			
Brody Hutzler	Landok	4		Recurring		Guest	
Michael Phenicie	Silas	3		Recurring			
Keith Szarabajka	Daniel Holtz	11			Recurring		
Daniel Dae Kim	Gavin Park	12		Guest	Recurring	Recurring	
David Denman	Skip	4			Recurring	Guest	
Jack Conley	Sahjhan	8			Recurring		Guest
John Rubinstein	Linwood Murrow	6			Recurring	Guest	
Laurel Holloman	Justine Cooper	8			Recurring	Guest	
Mark Lutz	The Groosalugg	9		Guest	Recurring		
Alexa Davalos	Gwen Raiden	3				Recurring	
Vladimir Kulich	The Beast	8				Recurring	
Eliza Dushku	Faith Lehane	6	Guest	Guest		Recurring	
Gina Torres	Jasmine	5				Recurring	
Sarah Thompson	Eve	10					Recurring
Jonathan M. Woodward	Knox	7				Guest	Recurring
Marc Vann	Dr. Sparrow	3					Recurring
Jenny Mollen	Nina Ash	3					Recurring
Leland Crooke	Archduke Sebassis	3					Recurring
Ryan Alvarez	Demon Slave	3					Recurring
Mark Colson	Izzy	3					Recurring
Jennifer Griffin	Trish Burkle	4			Guest		Recurring
Gary Grubbs	Roger Burkle	4			Guest		Recurring
Adam Baldwin	Marcus Hamilton	5					Recurring
Dennis Christopher	Cyvus Vail	3					Recurring

== Main characters ==
The principal cast of the first half of the show's final season from the show's opening sequence. From left to right: Gunn, Fred, Wesley, Angel, Lorne and Spike.

- David Boreanaz as Angel (1.01–5.22; After the Fall)

The titular main character, Angel is a vampire cursed with a soul who is prophesied to play a major role in the apocalypse. He spends most of his time during the series in fighting evil demons, sent on his path by visions from The Powers That Be. Angel's main motivation for his actions is a quest for redemption for the years he spent without a soul. Prior to his soul being restored he was Angelus infamously known as the most sadistic vampire in European history, "The Scourge of Europe", as well as "The Demon with the Face of an Angel", causing death and destruction wherever he went. Originally appearing in Buffy the Vampire Slayer, Angel was written out of that show at the end of the third season so he could star in his own spin-off. Angel is originally hesitant to form friendships and allow anyone to get close to him after the events in Buffy. Over the course of his own series, Angel falls in love with Cordelia, fathers a son and gains numerous allies and friends, but is always forced to control the monster that hides within him. Like many characters on the show, Angel changes drastically, starting out as an almost reluctant hero, and ending up an altruistic hero who is, in Cordelia's words, "trying to save everyone on the planet."

Angel is the only character to appear in every episode.

- Charisma Carpenter as Cordelia Chase (1.01–4.22, appeared in 5.12; After the Fall)

Cordelia Chase seeks to become a successful actress in Los Angeles after events in third season of Buffy. Contrary to that plan, however, she is sucked into Angel's life after almost being killed by a vampire. Initially more vain and self-centered (a facade she often tried to keep up in Buffy), Cordelia is forced to grow after the visions sent by The Powers That Be are bestowed upon her. During her tenure on the show, Cordelia undergoes this transformation, changing from high school popularity queen into a compassionate and nurturing figure. Events in the show's third season lead to Cordelia becoming a vessel for the being known as Jasmine in the fourth season, after which she falls into a coma. No longer a cast member in season five, she guest stars in the episode "You're Welcome", a send-off to her character, setting up the events for the series finale.

- Glenn Quinn as Allen Francis Doyle (1.01–1.09)

Allen Francis Doyle (more commonly known as just Doyle) is a half-demon, half-human hybrid and the original bearer of the visions from The Powers That Be. Doyle plays the Irish anti-hero, who would rather have a drink than fight the forces of evil. When put to the test however, Doyle shows a hero's heart, willingly sacrificing himself to save the lives of his friends in the episode "Hero", just after giving his visions to Cordelia. Archived footage of Doyle is used in two later episodes ("Birthday and "You're Welcome"), partially in remembrance of Glenn Quinn, who died in 2002.

- Alexis Denisof as Wesley Wyndam-Pryce (1.10–5.22, appeared previously; After the Fall)

After the death of Doyle, Wesley Wyndam-Pryce shows up, touting himself as a "rogue demon hunter". Wesley teams up with Angel and Cordelia, spending much of the first season providing comic relief, but over the course of the second and third seasons, Wesley grows into the role of a capable leader, accompanied by a darkening of his personality. Originally a tried and true hero, Wesley's methods lead to him becoming more of an anti-hero. Wesley is ousted from the team after events in the latter half of the third season, and is only reluctantly accepted during the apocalyptic events of the fourth season. Wesley is reintegrated into the group during the final season.

Wesley appears in 100 of the 110 episodes, missing only the first nine episodes of the series and the fifth season episode "Destiny". He is the only character besides Angel himself to be a regular in all five seasons. In Buffy the Vampire Slayer, Wesley and Cordelia shared a mutual attraction that ended abruptly when their kiss had no spark.

- J. August Richards as Charles Gunn (2.01–5.22, recurring previously; After the Fall)

Charles Gunn (frequently referred to as simply Gunn) appears at the end of the first season as a young demon hunter from the streets, who grudgingly befriends Angel after the vampire helps him. Joining the cast in season two, Gunn must adjust to Wesley and Cordelia, who are primarily researchers, while he seeks more solace in the simple brawn work. After events in the second season leave the three alone, he becomes close friends with both, notably Wesley, a friendship that is all but destroyed by the end of the third season. After spending three years with the team as "muscle", Gunn quickly accepts the chance to become a highly knowledgeable lawyer during the fifth season, which ends up costing him severely in the end.

- Amy Acker as Winifred "Fred" Burkle (3.01–5.15, recurring previously; After the Fall)

Winifred Burkle (more commonly called Fred) is originally a shy girl with troubles of fitting into the group but is shown to be extremely intelligent. She is saved from the demon world of Pylea by the Angel team in the last episodes of the second season. As the series progresses, however, Fred grows to become a capable and sociable person, providing a stable but quirky personality to group. She becomes the subject of a love triangle during the third and fourth season which has severe effects on the make-up of the team and becomes somewhat of a focal point in the series. In the latter half of the fifth season however, she is infected by the legendary demon Illyria, who takes over her form, destroying Fred's soul.

- Vincent Kartheiser as Connor (4.01–4.22, recurring previously and afterward; After the Fall)

Connor is the son of Angel and Darla. He first appeared in the third season as a baby, left in the care of Angel after Darla sacrificed herself in order to give birth to the child. Cared for and loved by the entire Angel crew, it came as a great shock when Wesley kidnapped Connor in hopes of protecting the child from a prophecy that cited Angel would kill him. Unbeknownst to Wesley, the prophecy had been a fake created by Daniel Holtz, mortal enemy of Angel, and Sahjhan, a demon whom Connor was actually prophesied to kill in the future. Sahjhan opened a portal to the hell dimension, Quor-Toth, and Holtz took the boy and jumped inside to escape capture. After spending years in Quor-Toth being raised by Holtz to become "The Destroyer", a vicious demon hunter, the two were able to return to the normal world. While only a few months had passed for Angel and crew, Connor was now in his late teens. Holtz was able to manipulate Connor into trying to kill Angel, but after Angel was saved, Connor grudgingly came to accept his father and joined the crew with a certain reluctance in the fourth season. Connor would play another important part in the season's final story, as he became father to the season's main adversary: Jasmine. After Jasmine's defeat, Angel allowed Wolfram & Hart to alter Connor's memories, giving him a normal human life, a spell that would ultimately be broken by Wesley during the show's fifth and final season. With two sets of memories mixing, Connor lives a confusing but content life, making an appearance in the series finale.

- Andy Hallett as Lorne (4.14–5.22, recurring previously; After the Fall)

Lorne is the pacifist and music-loving empathy demon originally opens up a violence-free karaoke bar called Caritas, open to both demons and humans, where he reads people's futures by their singing. He is introduced in the second season, still referred to as The Host then, he is not credited as a regular until the latter half of the show's fourth season. Originally an occasional supporting character, Lorne moves in with the team during the third season, when Caritas is destroyed. Although quickly accepted by the others, he has trouble adjusting to the violent lifestyle that accompanies the group. Lorne comes into his own finally when the team became the owners of Wolfram & Hart's Los Angeles branch, becoming head of the entertainment division. After the events of the fifth season's latter half, Lorne reevaluates his life and decides that he no longer has a place among the team. Andy Hallett died in 2009.

- James Marsters as Spike (5.01–5.22, recurring previously; After the Fall)

Spike is a vampire who fought to regain his soul and also an old companion/bitter enemy of Angel. He appears on Angel in the show's fifth and final season. He initially appears as an incorporeal being, per events of Buffys final episode "Chosen", and must deal with the tug of the afterlife, more specifically; hell. However, when Spike is made corporeal again, he comes to serve as a constant reminder of Angel's past deeds, but also the hero that Angel no longer sees himself as being. As such, Angel must question his actions past and present, the meaning of the Shanshu Prophecy, and finally, the corrupting nature of Wolfram & Hart. Although the two remain rivals, they have an unshakable bond that makes them brothers in arms right up to the end.

- Amy Acker as Illyria (5.15–5.22; After the Fall)

As a result of Fred inhaling Illyria's essence, her body is used as the host, with Illyria inheriting her human emotions, her legacy living on in some way. Although Illyria herself initially opposes the team, she joins them after she finds she has nowhere else to go, and gradually becomes accepted, standing by the team in the final moments of the series.

- Mercedes McNab as Harmony Kendall (5.17–5.22, recurring previously)

Harmony Kendall is the type of woman that never moved on after her popular high school years. She is still vapid, shallow and remains eternally at the age of a high school senior. Bitten by a vampire during the third season of Buffy the Vampire Slayer, Harmony has made recurring appearances on both shows, displaying the same ineptitude for being a vampire as she did for being a mortal. Taken from the Wolfram & Hart secretary pit by Wesley to work for Angel, Harmony earnestly tries to be accepted by Angel and the others, including former boyfriend Spike.

== Recurring ==
- Elisabeth Röhm as Kate Lockley (Seasons 1–2; After the Fall)

Kate Lockley is a police detective that meets Angel in the first season's second episode, Kate acts as a contact with the police. There are initial hints of a romance between the two, but those disappear when Kate learns of Angel's status as a vampire. Soon, she becomes obsessed with the occult, falling into a negative spiral only enhanced by her distrust of Angel and the death of her father, the man who had single-handedly raised her and was also a retired but respected police officer. Her obsessions grow to become a general hatred for vampires, including Angel, and the law firm of Wolfram & Hart. Angel, similarly obsessed with the firm, ignores Kate, and thereby almost arrives too late when she attempts suicide. Able to save her, the two reconcile, but Kate decides to leave Los Angeles, she has already been fired from the L.A.P.D., and does not reappear again. Before she leaves, she strengthens Angel's faith in the higher powers by mentioning that he was able to enter her apartment even though she never invited him in, implying that the higher powers granted him an exception.

- Julie Benz as Darla (Seasons 1–5)

Darla is Angel's sire and current lover. She is resurrected as a human in the first season finale, and is then employed by Wolfram & Hart to manipulate Angel. Appearing at various intervals during the early season two episodes, Darla is able to drive Angel into a paranoid and obsessive frenzy. During this time, Darla struggles with her human soul, and eventually learns that she is suffering from a fatal form of syphilis, as she did before being sired by the Master. Before Angel can really help her, she is targeted by Wolfram & Hart, who enlist Drusilla to sire Darla once more. Losing her soul again, Darla engages in a cat and mouse game in the process with Angel. In "Reprise", she and Angel have a one-night stand, after which Angel threatens to kill her. She returns in the third season, pregnant with their child.

- Matthew James as Merl (Seasons 2–3)

Merl was a demon informant for Angel during season 2, when he split from the rest of the Angel Investigations crew. Angel often abused Merl in various ways, such as dunking his head underwater. He was eventually killed in the season 3 episode, "That Old Gang of Mine", though not before Angel apologized to him for his cruel behavior. He appears in six episodes during seasons 2 and 3.

- Brigid Brannagh as Virginia Bryce (Season 2)

Virginia Bryce was introduced in the season 2 episode, "Guise Will Be Guise", in which Wesley (then masquerading as Angel), Cordelia, and Gunn were hired to protect her by her father. Her father then attempted to sacrifice Virginia at his birthday celebration, but the ritual failed. Virginia later learned that Wesley was not Angel, but forgave him and started to date him until she realized that Wesley's job was more dangerous than she originally believed.

- Julia Lee as Anne Steele (Seasons 2 and 5)

Anne Steele originally appeared on Buffy the Vampire Slayer in two episodes; in both instances, she is saved by Buffy Summers. Anne, who is prone to changing her name, later used Buffy's middle name as her own. Anne is later seen on Angel, as a youth counselor at a homeless teen center. Anne seems friendly with Gunn, and later with the rest of the Angel Investigations team. She appears in three episodes of Angel including the series finale "Not Fade Away".

- Mark Lutz as Groosalugg (Seasons 2–3; After the Fall)

Groosalugg is a half-demon/half-human who was originally from Pylea, Lorne's home dimension. He was the greatest warrior in Pylea, though was harshly treated by the priests who ruled the dimension. Soon after, he met Cordelia (who accidentally fell into Pylea through a portal), and the two had a short relationship before Cordelia went back to her own dimension. The Groosalugg later returned in season 3 in Los Angeles, and rekindled his relationship with Cordelia, though the two later ended it when Cordelia's increasing feelings for Angel became clear.

- Jennifer Griffin as Trish Burkle (Seasons 3, 5)

The mother of Fred, Trish first appears with her husband Roger during the third season where they track Fred to LA after her five years missing. They learn the truth of her disappearance and her role with Angel Investigations, accepting she belongs with them now. Trish appears twice in flashbacks in the fifth season to Fred leaving home. She and Roger again visit LA in the antepenultimate episode, unaware of Fred's death, and are fooled by Illyria masquerading as her.

- Alexa Davalos as Gwen Raiden (Season 4; After the Fall)

Gwen Raiden is a young woman with the ability to funnel electricity. Introduced as a thief in her first appearance, she eventually assisted Angel in the fight against the machinations of the Beast, and even shared a kiss with Angel. She had an interest in Gunn, whom she slept with. Gwen's powers often helped her professional career as a thief, though they were also considered a curse as for a long time, she could not touch anyone without electrifying them. Gwen later reappeared in After the Fall in which she is involved with Angel Investigations.

- Jenny Mollen as Nina Ash (Season 5; After the Fall)

Introduced in the season 5 episode, "Unleashed", Nina Ash was a young art major who became a werewolf. Nina became involved with Wolfram & Hart in exchange for shelter during the full moon. Angel later began dating Nina, with their relationship lasting until the end of the series. Nina left Los Angeles with her sister and niece in order to get away from the then-upcoming apocalypse. Nina later appeared in After the Fall, and provides shelter for demons and humans alike. At this point, Angel and Nina are no longer a couple, and she later marries someone else.

== Villains ==
Because of the nature of the Wolfram & Hart organization, they appeared in every season of Angel, providing him with a constant opposition. During the show's fifth season, Angel and his crew become the runners of Wolfram & Hart, but still fight against it in the form of its corruptive effect and their liaison to the Senior Partners, Eve.

=== Wolfram & Hart ===
- Christian Kane as Lindsey McDonald (Seasons 1–2, 5)

Lindsey McDonald is alternately both an enemy and ally to Angel Investigations as a rising star Associate with Wolfram & Hart and later working independently to undermine both organizations. His first appearance is in the latter moments of the show's first episode. Upon first meeting Angel, he initially boasts of how well Wolfram & Hart will protect their client (a vampire who murdered Angel's first client and attempted to kill Cordelia Chase) just before Angel throws the client out a high-rise window into the sunlight. Over the course of the following episodes his adversarial relationship with Angel becomes more personal and confrontational, trying several times to hire demon and superhuman assassins to attack and confound Angel, and even hiring rogue slayer Faith to attack him. Late in season one during the episode 'Blind Date', Lindsey has a "crisis of faith" in the work of Wolfram & Hart, and turns to Angel Investigations for their help in stopping a blind assassin (whom he defended for murder) from killing three young, blind children determined to be "threats" to the firm's agenda. Though he helps Angel infiltrate the firm and kill the assassin, the firm offers him a promotion to associate partner with a new office and a raise for his skill in outmaneouvering them, which he accepts. Having sided with the firm, his conflict becomes even more bitter in the first season finale, where Angel cuts off Lindsey's hand in combat to prevent him from burning the Shanshu prophecy and an incantation Angel needs to save Cordelia's life. During the second season, Lindsey's animosity with Angel grows as he copes with a prosthetic hand. Their conflict again comes to the forefront when Lindsey falls in love with Darla and attacks Angel brutally with his truck and a sledgehammer. However, Angel is able to overpower Lindsey and crushes his prosthetic hand. When Lindsey receives a new hand in the episode "Dead End", courtesy of Wolfram & Hart, he is forced to work with Angel when the hand begins to act oddly, realising that it was taken from a living donor who is being kept as a source of organs. At the end of the episode, having helped Angel destroy the lab holding various people to serve as similar donors, Lindsey, recognizing how far he has fallen, quits Wolfram & Hart and leaves Los Angeles to find himself, seemingly resolving his conflict with Angel.

Lindsey returns in season 5, hoping to kill Angel. Instead of direct confrontation, he chooses to undermine Angel's self-confidence by introducing a "competitor" to the Shanshu prophecy by resurrecting Spike, the only other known vampire with a soul, and pitting them against each other. Lindsey takes the guise of "Doyle", chosen specifically due to the psychological impact it would have on Angel, as Doyle was both the first member of Angel Investigations and the first to sacrifice himself in the line of duty, claiming that he receives visions of people in trouble and directing Spike to help them. He further co-opts Wolfram & Hart's resources to turn them against Angel, first by allying himself romantically with Eve, the liaison between Angel's office and the Senior Partners, to gather intelligence, and devises a plan to release Wolfram & Hart's contingency plan (a very powerful demon designed to kill Angel) from containment. He is caught, however, while releasing the contingency by a recently awakened Cordelia and Angel, whom he engages in single combat instead. Having accumulated new skills in magic, he initially gained the upper hand through a mix of stealth, telekinesis, transmutation, demon strength, and expert swordsmanship. Overwhelmed physically once Angel regains his confidence, Lindsey is stripped of his magical advantage by Wesley and captured by the Senior Partners. In his prison, the Senior Partners removed his memory and had him tortured to death daily; he is later rescued by Angel and his associates, but at the cost of Gunn taking his place until he (in turn) is later rescued by Illyria. He switches sides once again and volunteers to help Angel delay the apocalypse and destroy the Circle of the Black Thorn. Having retained his expert swordsmanship, he easily cuts down a horde of demons alongside Lorne but discovers too late that he is the final target. Lorne shoots him twice in the chest on Angel's orders, and Lindsey dies believing that he was cheated out of his climactic confrontation to the death with Angel, killed by a mere 'flunkie'. Lindsey is the only character besides Angel himself to appear in both the first and last episodes of the series.

- Thomas Burr as Lee Mercer (Season 1)

A lawyer at Wolfram & Hart who originally was a part of the division designed to track Angel. He was also acquaintances with Lindsey McDonald and Lilah Morgan. He was later killed when his boss, Holland Manners, believed that he was switching law firms and going to take clients with him.

- Stephanie Romanov as Lilah Morgan (Seasons 1–4)

The show's most recurring character, Lilah Morgan was initially a lawyer at Wolfram & Hart, but would progress to become the primary face of the law firm. Highly ambitious and competitive, Lilah proved herself to be one of the show's leading antagonists. She later engaged in an affair with Wesley, and became president of the Special Projects Division. She was killed in season 4 by Jasmine (in the body of Cordelia), but later reappeared in the Hell division of Wolfram & Hart and conveyed to Angel and his team the Senior Partners' offer of control of the Los Angeles division of Wolfram & Hart. Lilah appears in 35 episodes.

- Sam Anderson as Holland Manners (Seasons 1–2)

The head of Special Projects at Wolfram & Hart. He was known for arranging the deaths of people inside and outside the law firm, which included his employee Lee Mercer. He personally supervises Wolfram & Hart's operations regarding Angel. In particular, he oversees the resurrection of Angel's sire Darla and orchestrates her return to vampirism by Drusilla in an attempt to corrupt Angel. Eventually, Holland was killed in a massacre at his wine cellar by Darla and Drusilla. Angel was there, but due to Holland's corruption of him, failed to do anything to prevent the event from happening. Manners remained with Wolfram & Hart after death, as do all the firm's lawyers after their deaths.

- Gerry Becker as Nathan Reed (Season 2)

Nathan Reed was Lilah and Lindsay's new superior after Holland Manners' death. He appeared in "Blood Money", "Reprise" and "Dead End". He disappeared following season two, and was never mentioned again.

- Daniel Dae Kim as Gavin Park (Seasons 2–4)

Originally a lawyer for Wolfram & Hart who first appears at the end of the second season, Gavin Park had a longstanding rivalry with Lilah Morgan, whom he later worked under. He once assaulted Lilah in the season 3 episode, "Billy", which deepened their mutual dislike of each other. Gavin was responsible for setting up surveillance cameras on the Hyperion Hotel, where Angel Investigations was set up. In season 4, during the massacre at the offices of Wolfram & Hart, Gavin was killed by The Beast. However, he was subsequently brought back as a zombie, only to be killed by Gunn soon after.

- John Rubinstein as Linwood Murrow (Seasons 3–4)

Replacing Nathan Reed as the head of the Special Projects Division in season three, Linwood Murrow was originally the boss of Lilah Morgan and Gavin Park. Instead of being concerned with Wolfram & Hart's plans to corrupt Angel, Murrow was more concerned with his safety and personal agenda. He even attempted to kill Angel at one point, though the vampire would later torture him for information. Lilah disliked Murrow, who was sexist and misogynistic towards her, and disrespected him. Eventually, upon discovering that Lilah went over his head to meet with the Senior Partners, he confronts Lilah (who had replaced him as head of Special Projects) and is beheaded by her at a department meeting.

- Jonathan M. Woodward as Knox (Seasons 4–5)

First appearing in the season four finale, Knox seems to be the typical Wolfram & Hart employee, and not decidedly evil, although this is quickly questioned by Wesley. From their first meeting, Knox is quite taken with Fred, and over the time that the two are working together, a romance develops, but Fred eventually dumps him. Knox, however, has become obsessed with Fred, and orchestrates for her to be the host to Illyria, the being that he has been worshipping since childhood. Finally showing his evil side, working alongside Illyria, Wesley does not hesitate to gun him down as revenge for the death of Fred.

- Sarah Thompson as Eve (Season 5)

Eve serves as the team's liaison to the Senior Partners. The fact that the entire team does not trust her hardly unnerves her, and it is revealed she is in a relationship with Lindsey McDonald. Together, the two plot a scheme to kill Angel, but they fail and Eve is forced to go into hiding from the Partners' wrath. When new liaison Marcus Hamilton is assigned, she is also forced to sign over her immortality. Just as Lindsey returns to her, he decides to help Angel in his fight against the Circle of the Black Thorn. When she confronts Angel later, she learns he arranged Lindsey's assassination. Completely broken, she is left in the Wolfram & Hart office building as it starts to crumble around her.

- Adam Baldwin as Marcus Hamilton (Season 5)

Marcus Hamilton became the team's new liaison to the Senior Partners after Eve's betrayal. He is decidedly more stern than Eve and certain to not give the team any leeway. Eventually becoming a close advisor to Angel, Marcus must stand up to face him when Angel reveals his own betrayal. Describing himself as "legion" and carrying the strength of the Senior Partners in his blood, he loses his battle against Angel, flanked by his son Connor, when the vampire uses this knowledge to drain him of his power. The death of Hamilton is the final piece in Angel's plan of assassinating the Partners' agents, and leads directly into the final moments of the series, where the Senior Partners unleash a veritable hell on the team as retribution.

=== Second season ===
- Juliet Landau as Drusilla (Seasons 2, 5)

A vampire who originated on Buffy. Sired and driven mad by Angelus, Drusilla used to scour the world with Angel, Darla and her own sired vampire Spike. By the time of second season of Angel, Drusilla is called in to sire Darla by Wolfram & Hart, and together the two kill several through the city. Angel, taking a turn towards the dark, is able to defeat the two by setting them on fire, and Drusilla flees back to Sunnydale, appearing in the Buffy episode "Crush". She is not seen afterward except in flashbacks.

=== Third season ===
- Keith Szarabajka as Daniel Holtz (Season 3)

First mentioned in season 2 but first seen in season 3, Daniel Holtz was an 18th-century vampire hunter who hunted Angel (then Angelus) and Darla, even more so after they killed his family. He later made a deal with Sahjhan to be frozen in time for 200 years. Upon his revival in late 2001 (in the episode "Offspring"), he hunted down Angel and the Angel Investigations team. Later, Holtz kidnapped Angel's son Connor during the season, and raised him in a hell dimension, teaching Connor to hate and kill his father. Holtz and Connor returned to Los Angeles after years in the hell dimension (which translates to only a couple of months in Los Angeles), and Connor attempted to kill his father. When the boy failed to kill his father and later started to build a relationship with Angel, Holtz ordered Justine Cooper to kill him and make it look like Angel had murdered him. This development would lead to Connor sinking Angel to the bottom of the ocean at the end of season 3.

- Jack Conley as Sahjhan (Seasons 3, 5)

A demon of the Granok species, he first encountered Holtz in the late 18th century, and offered him to be frozen in time in order to kill Angel and Darla in the future. Sahjhan wanted for Holtz to kill Connor because a prophecy stated that Connor would grow into adulthood and kill him. He eventually grew impatient with Holtz when he kidnapped Connor in order to raise him to kill Angel in the hell dimension. He later abandoned Connor in the hell dimension Quor'toth, deciding he was good as dead when Holtz took him to that dimension. Sahjhan was imprisoned for a second time by Angel, but later returned. Connor killed Sahjhan in season 5, fulfilling the prophecy.

- Laurel Holloman as Justine Cooper (Seasons 3–4)

Justine Cooper is a vampire hunter and follower of Holtz. Devastated after her twin sister Julia was killed by vampires, Justine turned to alcohol and roamed graveyards at night, searching for vampires. She was recruited by Holtz in the season 3 episode "Dad" and formed a bond with him. Justine tried to find people who have lost loved ones to join their cause, and also attacked Wesley when he tried to deliver Connor to Holtz. She was later abandoned by Holtz, and rallied the remaining members of Holtz's militia against Angel. Eventually, Justine killed Holtz on his request, and framed the death on Angel, in order to get Connor to turn against his father Angel. She ultimately helped Connor with his plan to banish Angel to the bottom of the ocean. Justine was later captured by Wesley, who bound and gagged her and placed her in a closet for several months. The character was last seen in the season four premiere, "Deep Down" when Wesley left her chained to a railing and left her with a key, and told her she had the choice of moving on with her life or continue to be a slave.

- David Denman as Skip (Seasons 3–4)

Skip is a demon who initially claims to be working for the Powers That Be, guarding the misogynistic half-demon Billy Blim, who Angel was forced to free in order to save Cordelia. Skip later oversaw Cordelia's transformation into first a part-demon and then a "higher being". In the fourth season, he was revealed to be working for Jasmine, manoeuvring Cordelia into position so Jasmine could possess her. Having been captured and interrogated by Angel Investigations, he was killed by Wesley when he broke free.

=== Fourth season ===
- Vladimir Kulich as The Beast (Season 4)
- Gina Torres as Jasmine (Season 4)

A deity, Jasmine served as one of the main antagonists of the fourth season. Jasmine, also known as the "Devourer", is a super being who seeks to gain corporeal form, then blend with all of humanity, making each human her spiritual slave. She feeds on humanity to maintain her form and delivers a Utopian existence to all via mind control. For most of season four, Jasmine possessed Cordelia, leading to her host committing several out-of-character acts, e.g. Cordelia sleeping with Connor and later killing Lilah Morgan. A subsequent pregnancy was to give Jasmine a full body, and subsequently Cordelia gave birth to Jasmine; this birth would lead to Cordelia's coma and subsequent death. Jasmine wanted a world where the people were completely devoted to her, but this agenda failed, leading to Jasmine's death at the hands of Connor. According to Skip, Jasmine arranged for almost every major event that had occurred in the past seven years: Lorne's arrival, Angel's move to L.A., Doyle passing his visions to Cordelia, Cordelia's transformation into a half-demon and her ascension to the realms of the Powers, the birth of Connor, and the coming of The Beast.

=== Fifth season ===
- The Circle of the Black Thorn (Season 5)

The Circle of the Black Thorn serve as agents of the Senior Partners, and are to be the harbingers of the apocalypse. The Circle includes the characters Archduke Sebassis, Cyvus Vail, Izzerial the Devil and Senator Helen Brucker. They were ultimately destroyed by Angel and his team.

== Characters from Buffy the Vampire Slayer ==
- Seth Green as Daniel "Oz" Osbourne (Season 1)

Daniel "Oz" Osborne appears in the first season episode "In the Dark", crossing over from Buffy to give Angel the Gem of Amarra, which will grant him virtual immortality, thus eradicating any vampire weaknesses, such as sunlight or being killed via wooden stake. The Gem is stolen by Spike, also crossing over from Buffy and Oz assists the Angel crew in their search for him. Oz leaves Los Angeles again after the adventure is over, and Angel decides to destroy the Gem after he has taken it back from Spike.

- Sarah Michelle Gellar as Buffy Summers (Season 1)

Buffy Summers appears in two episodes of Angel's first season, first in "I Will Remember You", where she and Angel rekindle their love after he becomes human as a result of a Mohra demon's blood. After Angel learns from The Oracles, conduits to The Powers That Be that Buffy will die if he remains human, he asks them to turn back time, and prevents himself from being affected by the Mohra blood. She returns in "Sanctuary" to oppose Faith, leading to a conflict between Angel that was resolved in the following crossover, in the Buffy episode "The Yoko Factor". Buffy was at first thought to have appeared in the fifth season episode "The Girl in Question", but Sarah Michelle Gellar did not appear in the role, and in the Buffy Season Eight comics it was also revealed to be a decoy and not the real Buffy.

- Eliza Dushku as Faith Lehane (Seasons 1–2, 4)

Faith Lehane first made the jump to Angel in its first season, in the episode "Five by Five", hired to kill Angel. After kidnapping and torturing Wesley, she engages Angel in combat, secretly acting on a death wish. Angel is able to convince Faith to walk the path of redemption, the plot of the following episode "Sanctuary". Thanks to Angel's faith in her, Faith agrees to turn herself in and go to prison for her crimes, and Angel occasionally visits her, as he does in "Judgment". Faith returns in the show's fourth season, in the episode "Salvage", broken out of jail by Wesley in order to hunt down and bring in Angelus. Almost at the cost of her own life, they (with some assistance by Willow) succeed to re-ensoul Angel, and Faith goes with Willow to Sunnydale to help fight against The First Evil and Caleb which occurs in the seventh season of Buffy.

- Alyson Hannigan as Willow Rosenberg (Seasons 2, 4)

Willow Rosenberg first appeared on the phone in the season two episode "Disharmony", calling with Cordelia about Harmony. She again appeared, but in a non-speaking role, at the end of the second season finale "There's No Place Like Plrtz Glrb", to tell of Buffy's death in "The Gift", over on Buffy. Willow's last appearance is in the fourth season episode "Orpheus" to re-ensoul Angel as she did in the second season of Buffy. During this short time with the team, she connected with the members of Angel's crew, notably Wesley (in fact, Alexis Denisof, the actor portraying Wesley, is married to Hannigan in real-life), who shared their respective experiences with the darkness inside them. As an extra to the adventure, Willow was able to take Faith back to Sunnydale to aid in the ongoing events of the seventh season of Buffy.

- Tom Lenk as Andrew Wells (Season 5)

The last of the Buffy alumni, Andrew Wells appears twice in the show's fifth and final season. First in the episode "Damage" as a representative for Buffy's gang to pick up new rogue slayer Dana. It is Andrew that expresses the group's new distrust for Angel's team, reuniting with the resurrected Spike at the same time. Andrew ultimately tricks Angel's team into giving up Dana after he appears with a large group of slayers. Andrew returns in "The Girl in Question", as a support to the Buffy decoy (as revealed in the Buffy Season Eight comics), giving Spike and Angel some advice on life and telling them it is time to let Buffy move on (for now).
