= Undeveloped Buffy the Vampire Slayer spinoffs =

The popular fictional Buffyverse established by TV series, Buffy the Vampire Slayer and Angel has led to attempts to develop more commercially viable programs set in the fictional 'Buffyverse'. However some of these projects remain undeveloped for various reasons: sometimes, vital cast members may be unavailable; alternatively, studios and networks which would provide capital for the spinoffs might remain unconvinced that such projects are financially viable.

From 2007 onwards, many ideas for unproduced Buffy spin-offs found their way into canonical comic books. Ideas for Faith were utilised in Dark Horse Comics' Buffy the Vampire Slayer Season Eight; ideas for Spike featured in IDW Publishing's Angel: After the Fall; and characters and plotlines developed for Ripper were adapted for Dark Horse's Angel & Faith.

== Overview ==
A summary of the undeveloped productions:

Undeveloped Buffyverse productions
Title	Idea first publicly revealed
Description
"Corrupt"	1999
"Corrupt" was originally intended as the second Angel episode, but the script was replaced due to the dark tone of the story.
Buffy: The Animated Series	2002
Buffy: The Animated Series was an undeveloped animated TV show based on Buffy the Vampire Slayer.
Ripper	2002
Based upon the life of the character of Rupert Giles in England.
Slayer School	2003
The show might have used some of the Potentials who had become slayers after the Buffy finale.
Faith the Vampire Slayer	2003
Tim Minear was behind an unfulfilled idea for a Buffy spinoff in 2003 featuring Eliza Dushku as the popular antihero slayer Faith.
Spike	2004
Spike is a proposed movie based upon the character starring James Marsters.
Untitled reboot	2018
A proposed reboot series focusing on a new slayer
Buffy the Vampire Slayer: New Sunnydale	2025
A pilot for an unproduced revival featuring Sarah Michelle Gellar reprising her role, and Ryan Kiera Armstrong as a new slayer

== Buffy: The Animated Series ==
Buffy: The Animated Series was an undeveloped animated TV show based on Buffy the Vampire Slayer. Development began on the show in 2001 and the series was initially greenlit by 20th Century Fox in 2002. Six scripts were completed by members of Mutant Enemy and in 2004 a four-minute presentation was produced (which was distributed only within the industry). However, it ultimately went unproduced and unaired when no network was willing to buy the series.

== "Corrupt" ==
"Corrupt" was originally intended as the second Angel episode. The story used dark and adult themes. The script written by David Fury included the character Kate Lockley as a drug-addicted cop deep undercover as a prostitute, and also included Angel tasting the blood of a victim. The production was abandoned, and instead the "lighter" episode, "Lonely Hearts," was written and produced.

== Faith the Vampire Slayer ==
Tim Minear was behind an idea for a Buffy spinoff in 2003 featuring Eliza Dushku as the popular antihero slayer Faith. Instead, Dushku would go on to star as the main character in the series Tru Calling.

- IGN asked Eliza Dushku about the Faith spinoff:
  IGNFF: I heard they were actually devising a Faith spin-off for you. Why did you decide not to go that route?
  Dushku: The idea for the Faith spin-off just kind of came up in discussion because everyone really, I think, was feeling like this show's going to end and there are all these fans who love it so much and who love these characters and so, if possible, how could we extend that? I just personally felt like... It would have been a really hard thing to do, and not that I wouldn't have been up for a challenge, but with it coming on immediately following the show, I think that those would have been really big boots to fill. I think it would have been compared to Buffy. And just in terms of me, I've played that character on and off for five years now and I've changed a lot and while the character of Faith changed when I came back because I've changed, I felt like maybe it was time to... I mean, I love Faith. She's my girl and she's been really good to me, but I kind of just wanted to try something else. Purely that, because it had nothing to do with me not trusting Joss and his team of writers, who I just think are amazing. Tim Minear and Drew Goddard, and Marti Noxon and all these people, they're so talented and it had nothing to do with me doubting that they could make this show amazing, but I just... I don't know, sometimes you have to go with your gut, and my gut was telling me that I maybe needed to try something else that was just different.
- Tim Minear explained some of the details about the spinoff and reasons why it did not happen:
  "I had come up with a pitch. Eliza was gracious, kind and wonderful, but she felt like she wanted to do something new. There is no hard feelings there. But the show was basically going to be Faith meets Kung Fu. It would have been Faith, probably on a motorcycle, crossing the earth, trying to find her place in the world. I'm sure it would get an arc at some point, but the idea of her rooted somewhere seemed wrong to me. The idea of her constantly on the move seemed right to me. And she broke out of prison (on Angel) so there would have been some people after her."
- Tru Calling producer Dawn Parouse later admitted uncertainty during the show's development that Eliza would choose it over the spinoff:
  "We weren't quite sure if we were going to get [Eliza], because there were rumors that there was going to be a Buffy spinoff for her."

Ideas intended for the spin-off were later borrowed in small part by Brian K. Vaughan for his "No Future for You" arc in Buffy the Vampire Slayer Season Eight.

== Ripper ==
Ripper was originally a proposed television show based upon the character of Rupert Giles from Buffy the Vampire Slayer (created by Joss Whedon). More recent information has suggested that if Ripper were ever made it would be a TV movie or a DVD movie. Giles, played by British actor Anthony Stewart Head, was nicknamed 'Ripper' while he was dabbling in the occult during his rebellious youth.

Whedon said that the show would be in the tradition of "classic English ghost stories" and would explore the theme of loneliness. Head described the idea as being like "Cracker with ghosts"; Whedon elaborated on some of the themes he had planned for the series: "The people who live there, it's all very isolated. [Giles] himself has been gone for many years. He was surrounded by a de facto family that he no longer has. And [he is] sort of picking up his life all alone, and then getting involved in the underbelly of other people's lives, and finding out all about them. Loneliness is what I think of. It may not be the theme so much as the emotional intent of the series, but that's what really attracts it to me the most." It was later reported that Whedon had written the two-hour pilot, and that Espenson and other Buffy staff writers had penned story outlines for other potential episodes.

Originally in 2001, the show was planned to be aired as a miniseries on the BBC. Later mentions suggested a TV movie, however in an interview in December 2005, Head suggested that Ripper would be a "two hour movie, that might become part of a series of [Buffyverse] DVDs". However, Whedon was then involved in his new TV series Dollhouse which ended in 2010 and comic book Buffy Season 8. Whedon announced plans for a Ripper series as soon as Head left Buffy in 2001 to return to his home in England. Over the past eight years, the idea has evolved.

At the 2007 San Diego Comic-Con, Whedon confirmed that talks were almost completed for a 90-minute Ripper special on the BBC, with both Head and the BBC completely on board.

The development process was supposedly set to begin in 2008 and Ripper was to be shown in the summer of that year. However, in a BBC interview in April 2008, Head stated that, "Creator Joss Whedon is busy with another project, I'm tied up too, so at the moment I'd just say that it's still out there." In this same interview, Head mentioned that Whedon had discussed the project with Doctor Who and Torchwood producer Julie Gardner:

"Originally, when he pitched it to me, it was a series, and it was Giles as this sad, lonely man in England without a real reason to be. [...] It was pretty much ghost stories. Week by week, some ghost story would somehow affect him. Then he said he didn't want to. By that time, I think he had been affected by Angel, the need to write a weekly story. I think he found at that point the drive was different, so he suggested this one film that we were going to make. He told me this story that he had written, and it's absolutely beautiful, and I hope that one day it gets made, whether it's in the guise of Ripper or whether we just tell it as a one-off TV movie. It's a lovely, lovely story. It's kind of a ghost story. It's also about a man investigating his own soul, and it's fascinating, lovely, sad, and it's classic Joss Whedon. I hope we get to make it one day. From there on in, if it was successful, maybe he could have been convinced to do a series. As I say, now he's back in the seat of doing a weekly series with Dollhouse; maybe he can be convinced otherwise. Never say never, but at the same time, I think it's on a shelf for a while."

Later Joss Whedon gave an interview to TV Week's James Hibberd and was non-committal about Ripper. Whedon stated that "There isn't anything new. It might become too problematic. The rights issue with Ripper becomes complicated. There are other characters in the woods. We may have to do some fancy footwork. Obviously I'm committed to Dollhouse but that does not mean I'm not doing Ripper." In an interview from "The Write Environnement", Whedon reiterated: "Well, Ripper fell victim to a lot of things, most of them contractual... at this point, all I know is I'm gonna do something with Tony for the BBC – and I don't know what it is... Actually, I kinda do know what it is, but I haven't figured it out enough to tell anybody... but I think it probably won't be Ripper."

With the cancellation of Dollhouse, Whedon had been locked in talks over the rights issues of the character of Rupert Giles. This was the only hurdle with the BBC having funding, location and local production team in place, with Whedon delivering the initial script. It remained unclear whether it would go beyond a 90-minute TV special or become a stand-alone miniseries.

During an interview with The A.V. Club, Whedon said, "The thing about Ripper—the essence of it—is that the BBC came to me at one point like, 'It doesn't have to be Ripper. It can just be [Anthony Stewart Head], and there's magic, and he's Tony, cuz he's awesome.' And that's the thing: For some reason, he keeps getting sexier every year. That's not happening to me! I'm like, 'What are you doing?' And that story was always about a mature guy who's lived, and about the choices he's made. So you could make that now, or you could make it 10 years from now. And I've tortured Tony more than any other living human with, 'We're definitely gonna do this!' Because I thought we were. He's working so much, though, I'd feel too guilty. But that's the thing with Ripper: It doesn't go away in my head because he's still right for it, and he could still bring it."

In 2012, content for the Ripper TV series began to be adapted for the comic book Angel & Faith, which depicts Angel's quest to resurrect Giles, while living in Giles' London home, which passed on to his primary inheritor, Faith Lehane. Storylines depicting Giles' past in this series were intended for Ripper, as were several of its characters. Giles' aunts feature, ageless witches named Sophronia and Lavinia Fairweather. Whedon had intended from them to be portrayed by Anthony Head's daughters Emily and Daisy Head in the live action series.

== Slayer School ==
Jane Espenson has said that back when the series Buffy was nearing its end, "I think Marti talked with Joss about Slayer School, I assume there was some back-and-forth pitching."

Espenson revealed more information when she gave a talk at Ball State University in March 2003. The show might have used some of the Potentials (who became slayers after "Chosen"), and other characters from Buffy, which might have included Willow Rosenberg. Espenson also revealed that Whedon did not think that such a spinoff felt right. It seems that the concept for Slayer School was never developed beyond a 'pitch' for a potential spin-off to replace Buffy.

== Spike film ==
Spike was a proposed film based upon the character of Spike from Buffy and Angel. The idea was considered dead by 2006 and in 2012 James Marsters, the actor who had portrayed the character Spike, confirmed for 411Mania that he would not play Spike again: he felt he was too visibly old to play the character without having "to cheat". In a later interview in June 2016, Marsters clarified that he might reprise his role as Spike in the future, but only if technology had advanced far enough that it would be able to convince viewers that Spike had not aged. He stated that in 2004, when he was asked by Joss Whedon if he would be willing to be cast as Spike in future projects, he replied that he would be able to portray him for up to seven years after the end of the Angel series. After this time had passed in 2011, Marsters believed that he was too old to play the part.

Marsters discussed some ideas that he had for the movie with Whedon and he created a script for the film. Marsters' script was used in 2014 and released as a comic titled Spike: Into The Light. It was published by Dark Horse Comics and loosely follows the proposed plot of the TV movie. The illustrations in the comic were produced by Derlis Santacruz, Dan Jackson and Steve Morris.

The story of the graphic novel follows the same plot of the unproduced Spike film. It takes place in between the end of season 6 and the beginning of season 7 of the Buffy the Vampire Slayer series in which Spike has recently earned his soul and is homeless on the streets. He finds it very difficult to survive without committing crimes. The vampire has damaged his boots and requires a new pair. On the way to redemption, he saves children from a monster and faces his past.

=== Production details ===
After Angel was cancelled in 2004, The WB claimed an interest in possible Angel TV movies. However, it was soon revealed that summer that David Boreanaz, who had already played the character for eight years on television, would only return to his character for a theatrical release.

In May 2004, James Marsters revealed that there might be a possibility of a Spike movie. The same year he said that he would be willing to return to the Buffyverse if it were within five years. Beyond that five years he feared that it would no longer be believable that Marsters was portraying an immortal character.

Since 2004 Whedon has been working on other projects, such as Serenity, Wonder Woman and Astonishing X-Men. However he has approached people and asked if they would be interested in participating in the Spike film. He has said that Amy Acker would be a part of the movie, and if Alyson Hannigan was available she might appear. Whedon has even mentioned he might interlink the Spike story with that yet to be told in Buffy comics he will be writing for Dark Horse in 2007.

Tim Minear revealed in late 2005 that Whedon had asked him if he "wanted to write and direct some 'blond vampire movie thing'."

David Janollari, president of entertainment at The WB said in January 2006 that, "We'd love to do a Spike movie with Joss Whedon," However he added that "Joss Whedon is busy, fast becoming a kind of a big feature filmmaker. He's simply not available to us. But he knows, and you guys all know, the door is open any time that he wants to do that, for us to do that movie."

Since then Whedon has continued to pursue the Spike film, and find interested parties that would air and/or produce the film led by Minear, and starring Marsters and Acker. During March 2006, Whedon appeared on the UK TV Channel, MTV Screenplay, announcing that he was still trying to get Spike made. In May 2006, outside the Saturn Awards, Whedon announced that he had pitched the concept to various bodies but had yet to receive any feedback. Amy Acker said at a convention in May 2006 that the Spike film would not be happening: "I think it's safe to say that's not happening anymore, cause if they were, they'd be getting done right now. There was supposed to be three of them – one for Spike, a Faith one and also one for Willow. I think it's safe to say that now because it's not going to happen." In June 2006, Whedon also said that funding was a problem: "There are certain characters I've been saving because I thought I might make movies about them, but that doesn't look like it's going to happen. I think money is standing in the way".

=== Writing and acting ===
- Tim Minear would primarily write and direct with support of Whedon.
- The cast would include James Marsters as Spike, Amy Acker as Illyria, and possibly Alyson Hannigan as Willow Rosenberg.
- J. August Richards would reprise his role as Charles Gunn, who would serve as the main villain after being turned into a vampire.

=== Story and continuity ===
- Whedon indicated that the Spike film would take place after "the end of Buffy and Angel".

== 2018 reboot ==
In July 2018, 20th Century Fox Television reportedly began development on a television reboot of the series. Monica Owusu-Breen was to serve as showrunner and had been working on the script with Whedon, who was to be an executive producer. News of Whedon's involvement was seen as reassuring by fans, though the extent of his involvement was unclear; other executive producers reported to be involved included Gail Berman, Fran Kuzui, and Kaz Kuzui, all credited as executive producers for the original series. According to anonymous sources who spoke with The Hollywood Reporter and Deadline Hollywood, the producers wanted the new series to be "richly diverse ... [and] some aspects of the series could be seen as metaphors for issues facing society today"–similar to the way Gellar described the original series as the "ultimate metaphor" for coping with adolescence. The producers intended "for the new slayer to be African American", an example of the diversity they wish to portray. The report from Deadline Hollywood cautioned that "the project is still in nascent stages with no script, and many details are still in flux".

Concerns were expressed about the decision to reboot the series, rather than to revive it or further expand the Buffyverse. Reports that a black actress was to assume the iconic role of Buffy, rather than having a new character or Slayer created, have been met with questions and concerns. Vox noted that "the original series already had multiple characters of color who could factor into an 'inclusive' reboot–including the black slayer Kendra and the 'First Slayer'" – leaving fans wondering "why a reboot has to racebend Buffy, when it could simply focus on a different character". A Twitter message posted by Owusu-Breen on July 26, 2018, was interpreted by media outlets as indicating that the new series would not recast the role of Buffy and instead would focus on a new Slayer. In August 2022, executive producer Gail Berman announced that the series was put "on pause" indefinitely.

== Buffy the Vampire Slayer: New Sunnydale ==
In February 2025, Variety reported that a Buffy sequel series was nearing a pilot order at Hulu without Whedon's involvement. Gellar was set to reprise her role and serve as an executive producer alongside Gail Berman, Fran Kuzui, Kaz Kuzui, and Dolly Parton. Chloé Zhao was appointed as the pilot's director, with Nora and Lilla Zuckerman credited as the writers. The new series would feature a new Slayer as the primary protagonist, while Buffy Summers would appear in a recurring role. In May 2025, Ryan Kiera Armstrong was cast in the lead role.

Filming for the pilot began in Los Angeles in August 2025. On March 14, 2026, Gellar announced that Hulu was no longer moving forward with it.
