= Angel season 1 =

Angel
- Season 1
- Region 1 Season 1 DVD cover
- Showrunners: Joss Whedon; David Greenwalt
- Starring: David Boreanaz; Charisma Carpenter; Glenn Quinn; Alexis Denisof
- No. of episodes: 22

Release
- Original network: The WB
- Original release: October 5, 1999 – May 23, 2000

Season chronology
- Next → Season 2

The first season of the television series Angel, the spin-off of Buffy the Vampire Slayer, premiered on October 5, 1999, on The WB and concluded its 22-episode season on May 23, 2000. The season aired on Tuesdays at 9:00 pm ET, following Buffy.

== Origins ==
Series co-creator David Greenwalt points out "there's no denying that Angel grew out of Buffy". Several years before Angel debuted, Joss Whedon developed the concept behind Buffy the Vampire Slayer to invert the Hollywood formula of "the little blonde girl who goes into a dark alley and gets killed in every horror movie." The character Angel was first seen in the first episode of Buffy and became a regular, appearing in the opening credits during seasons two and three. After being turned into a soulless, immortal vampire, he became legendary for his evil acts, until a band of wronged Gypsies punished him by restoring his soul, overwhelming him with guilt. Angel eventually set out on a path of redemption, hoping that he could make up for his past through good deeds. In Buffy's season three finale, he leaves Sunnydale for L.A. to continue his atonement without Buffy. Whedon believed that "Angel was the one character who was bigger than life in the same way that Buffy was, a kind of superhero." Whedon has compared the series to its parent, "It's a little bit more straightforward action show and a little bit more of a guys' show."

While the central concept behind Buffy was "High school as a horror movie" in small-town America, co-creators David Greenwalt and Whedon were looking to make Angel into a different "gritty, urban show." Whedon explains "we wanted a much darker show, darker in tone. It is set in Los Angeles because there are a lot of demons in L.A. and a wealth of stories to be told. We also wanted to take the show a little older and have the characters deal with demons in a much different way. Buffy is always the underdog trying to save the world, but Angel is looking for redemption. It's those two things that creatively make the shows different."

Whedon and Greenwalt prepared a six-minute promotional video pitch, often called the "Unaired Angel pilot" for the WB Network. Some shots from this short were later used in the opening credits.

Early during the life of the series, some effort was made to slightly soften the original concept. For example, scenes were cut from the pilot episode, "City of," in which Angel tasted the blood of a murder victim. The episode that was originally written to be the second episode, "Corrupt", was abandoned altogether. Writer David Fury explains, "The network was shocked. They said 'We can't shoot this. This is way too dark.' We were able to break a new idea, we had to turn it over in three days." Instead the tone was lightened, and the opening episodes established Angel Investigations as an idealistic shoestring operation.

A first draft script reveals that Angel was originally intended to include the character Whistler, played by Max Perlich, who had already featured in the two-part Buffy season two finale. In an interview, Perlich said, "I never got called again. If they had called, I would have probably accepted because it was a great experience and I think Joss is very original and talented." Instead, the producers created a Whistler-like character, Doyle. Cordelia Chase, also from the original Sunnydale crew, joined Angel and Doyle.

== Season synopsis ==
At the end of the third season of Buffy, the 242-year-old, re-ensouled vampire Angel left Sunnydale to give teenage Slayer Buffy Summers the chance to live a normal life. Angel is now living in the big city of Los Angeles. With Buffy gone Angel is now completely cut off from society, every day getting closer and closer to giving in to his vampiric hunger. It's not until he befriends the half demon and fellow Irishman Doyle, who is sent visions of people in trouble by The Powers That Be, and fellow Sunnydale resident Cordelia Chase, who grounds Angel's life in the humanity around him, that he truly begins to take charge of his life and seek atonement for his past sins. He sets up his own detective agency, Angel Investigations and begins to "help the helpless".

Early in the season, Angel befriends a detective named Kate Lockley who at first helps and befriends Angel but turns on him after she finds out what he truly is. As the season comes to a close, Angel gains a semi-ally in the form of a street smart vampire hunter named Charles Gunn who will officially join the team early in the next season. Throughout the year Angel and co. are frequently set upon by the demonic law firm Wolfram & Hart, and the antics of two up and coming lawyers Lindsey McDonald and Lilah Morgan, who have secret plans concerning the vampire with a soul and the role he plays in the forthcoming apocalypse.

In "I Will Remember You" Buffy comes to L.A. during which Angel is cured of his vampirism by the blood of a Mohra demon. He and Buffy then share the perfect day they always dreamed of together. However, Angel asks the Oracles to reverse time so that he can continue to help people in need realizing that he cannot protect the world as a normal human man. He subsequently gives up the one thing he ever truly loved to continue fighting the good fight.

A few days later Doyle sacrifices his life as an act of redemption when he saves the lives of a family of half demon refugees. Before he dies he gives Cordelia a long-awaited kiss as the two had slowly been building a relationship all year and passes the godly visions on to her. In his place, ex-watcher Wesley Wyndam-Pryce arrives and aids the team with his extensive knowledge of demonology and the occult.

In the two-parter, "Five by Five" and "Sanctuary", the rogue Slayer, Faith shows up in L.A. and is contracted by Wolfram & Hart to kill Angel. After torturing Wesley she ends up breaking down in Angel's arms, screaming at him to kill her. She eventually admits to the many crimes she has committed and hands herself in to the police. Seeing someone else so willingly seek redemption allows Angel to re-affirm his role and to willingly cut himself off from Buffy. Angel also develops a friendship with Faith, sharing a powerful bond which would eventually be pivotal in their future alliances.

During the season finale Angel comes across an ancient prophecy that concerns his fate. Wolfram & Hart summon the demon Vocah to "destroy all avenues to The Powers That Be" and summon forth an ancient, terrible evil: Angel's sire, Darla. Wesley finishes translating the prophecy and learns that the word Shanshu means to both live and die informing Angel that if he truly saves the world he will be made human again and his burdens will be forever lifted. Meanwhile, the Angel Investigations offices are blown up forcing the gang to work out of Cordelia's apartment who, after having seen all the pain that infests Los Angeles, has vowed to up her stance in the fight against evil and become a better person.

== Cast and characters ==
=== Main cast ===
- David Boreanaz as Angel
- Charisma Carpenter as Cordelia Chase
- Glenn Quinn as Allen Francis Doyle
- Alexis Denisof as Wesley Wyndam-Pryce

=== Recurring cast ===
- Sarah Michelle Gellar as Buffy Summers
- Elisabeth Röhm as Kate Lockley
- J. August Richards as Charles Gunn
- Christian Kane as Lindsey McDonald
- Stephanie Romanov as Lilah Morgan
- Thomas Burr as Lee Mercer
- Julie Benz as Darla
- Eliza Dushku as Faith
- Sam Anderson as Holland Manners
- David Herman as David Nabbit

=== Guest cast ===
- Seth Green as Daniel "Oz" Osbourne
- James Marsters as Spike

== Crew ==
Series creators Joss Whedon and David Greenwalt both served as executive producers, while Greenwalt would serve as the series' showrunner as Whedon was running Buffy. Greenwalt wrote the most episodes, writing or co-writing five episodes and contributing stories for two other episodes. Tim Minear was hired from the offset and wrote or co-wrote five episodes throughout the season and served as producer and then promoted to supervising producer midseason. He was also the first original Angel writer to write an episode; the first five scripts of the series were all written by Buffy veterans; Whedon, Greenwalt, Jane Espenson, Douglas Petrie and David Fury. Buffy writer/producer Marti Noxon served as consulting producer and did several uncredited rewrites, and co-wrote one episode with Greenwalt. The rest of writing staff included producer Tracey Stern, staff writer Jeannine Renshaw, and consulting producer Howard Gordon (who also served as consulting producer on Buffy season two). After Gordon departed to work on a new pilot, Jim Kouf joined as consulting producer. Garry Campbell was hired to write a freelance episode.

Whedon wrote and directed one episode throughout the season, the series premiere "City of", due to him working on two shows at once. He did however write the story for another two episodes; "I Fall to Pieces with David Greenwalt and "Sanctuary" with Tim Minear.

Veteran Buffy director James A. Contner (also co-producer) directed the highest number of episodes in the first season, directing four episodes. David Greenwalt directed two, including the season finale.

== Episodes ==
No. overall	No. in season	Title	Directed by	Written by	Original release date	Prod. code	U.S. viewers (millions)
1	1	"City Of"	Joss Whedon	Joss Whedon & David Greenwalt	October 5, 1999	1ADH01	7.47
Newly arrived in Los Angeles, Angel is befriended by a half-human half-brachen demon named Allen Francis Doyle whose visions lead him to a woman, Tina, who is being stalked. Tina is killed by a powerful vampire, Russell. His next intended victim is former Sunnydale resident Cordelia Chase. Angel rescues Cordelia and then he deals with Russell by kicking him out of the window into sunlight, killing him. This is Angel's introduction to the evil law firm of Wolfram & Hart.
2	2	"Lonely Heart"	James A. Contner	David Fury	October 12, 1999	1ADH02	5.82
Angel tracks a demon which moves from one body to another leaving an eviscerated corpse behind. The demon is hunting for the perfect body and will continue to search leaving corpses in its wake. The stalking ground is happening at a Los Angeles singles bar. This is where Angel meets the undercover LAPD detective Kate Lockley for the first time.
3	3	"In the Dark"	Bruce Seth Green	Douglas Petrie	October 19, 1999	1ADH03	5.58
Angel receives an unexpected visit from Oz, who delivers a gift from Buffy, the Gem of Amara (a mystical ring that would grant a vampire wearer complete invulnerability to all their usual weaknesses). However, Spike is in hot pursuit, wanting the ring for himself. In the end, Angel decides to destroy the gem.
4	4	"I Fall to Pieces"	Vern Gillum	Story by : Joss Whedon & David Greenwalt; Teleplay by : David Greenwalt	October 26, 1999	1ADH04	5.45
Doyle has a vision of a woman, Melissa, in danger and Angel discovers she is being stalked by a neurosurgeon who can detach and then reattach parts of his body at will as part of “psychic surgery,” such as detaching his eyeball and using it to spy on her.
5	5	"Rm w/a Vu"	Scott McGinnis	Story by : David Greenwalt & Jane Espenson; Teleplay by : Jane Espenson	November 2, 1999	1ADH05	5.05
Cordelia finds the perfect apartment, which turns out to be haunted by the ghostly spirit of an overprotective mother and her son Dennis; she had bricked her son, while he was alive, into the wall years ago (she died moments afterward, so he was never found). The mother's spirit is banished while the spirit of her son Dennis remains as Cordelia's "ghost mate". Doyle's troubles catch up with him.
6	6	"Sense & Sensitivity"	James A. Contner	Tim Minear	November 9, 1999	1ADH06	5.72
Kate is very good at her job, but her temper makes the LAPD brass send the entire department to sensitivity training. When Kate asks Angel to accompany her to a cop function - her father's retirement - Angel begins to notice her strange emotional behavior and that of all the people who attended the training. Then, Angel is also infected, as it turns out to be a distraction arranged by Wolfram & Hart to enable a client of theirs to escape custody.
7	7	"The Bachelor Party"	David Straiton	Tracey Stern	November 16, 1999	1ADH07	5.32
Doyle's soon-to-be ex-wife comes to town, but her Ano-Movic demon fiancé-to-be wants something more than Doyle's signature on divorce papers. He invites Doyle to his bachelor party, where he wants to eat his brains as part of his demon race’s tradition to eat the brains of their bride-to-be’s ex-husband. The episode ends with Doyle having a vision, which is of Buffy and she's in trouble.
8	8	"I Will Remember You"	David Grossman	David Greenwalt & Jeannine Renshaw	November 23, 1999	1ADH08	6.50
Angel returns from Sunnydale (after the events of "Pangs"). Buffy comes to L.A. to visit Angel to express her displeasure that he had visited Sunnydale without letting her know. A demon attacks them and its blood infects Angel, making him mortal. Buffy and Angel make love, meanwhile the demon regenerates and a mortal Angel goes to fight it, and Buffy goes to his rescue and kills the demon. Before its death, the demon tells Angel that the end of days is coming. Angel visits the Oracles and asks them what will happen and is told that Buffy will die. Angel asks them to take his life and to let Buffy live, they tell him the only way is to take back the last 24 hours.
9	9	"Hero"	Tucker Gates	Howard Gordon & Tim Minear	November 30, 1999	1ADH09	5.42
Doyle's own chance for atonement comes sooner than expected when he receives a vision that a band of part-human Lister demons are trying to escape from the Scourge, an army of supremacist storm-trooper demons who claim "pure" blood and consequently persecute those of "mixed" blood. While Doyle goes after a strayed Lister teen and Cordelia handles details of the escape plan, Angel infiltrates the enemy and discovers their secret weapon, a bomb-like device called the Beacon that combusts anyone with any taint of human blood. Events lead to a climactic showdown aboard a tramp freighter, where Doyle finally confesses his half-demon heritage - and his love for her - to Cordelia. Angel attempts to sacrifice himself to destroy the Beacon as it begins to operate, but Doyle, himself a half-breed demon, knocks Angel out, kisses Cordelia, disables the Beacon, and dies from its effects. Angel and Cordelia later sadly watch the video Doyle had been making.
10	10	"Parting Gifts"	James A. Contner	David Fury & Jeannine Renshaw	December 14, 1999	1ADH10	5.64
Still reeling from Doyle's death just days prior, Angel and Cordelia encounter an old friend from Sunnydale, Buffy’s former Watcher, Wesley Wyndam-Pryce, now a rogue demon hunter. Meanwhile, Cordelia discovers that Doyle has passed on his gift of visions from the Powers That Be, which subject her to the same unbearable headaches that afflicted Doyle. When one of Angel’s clients, a black-marketeer demon named Barney, learns of Cordelia’s new powers, he abducts her and auctions off her "seer's eyes" to a group of wealthy demons and humans, including a representative from Wolfram & Hart. Wesley assists Angel in Cordy's rescue and effectively — if unofficially — joins the Angel Investigations team.
11	11	"Somnambulist"	Winrich Kolbe	Tim Minear	January 18, 2000	1ADH11	4.77
Kate is investigating a serial killer who is stalking the L.A. streets. All the victims have a cross cut on their cheek, a mark that Angel once used while Angelus. Angel is dreaming of the murders, Cordelia and Wesley chain him up for the night and he then realizes that he is not the killer – it is his former protégée, Penn. When Kate goes to arrest Penn, Angel is also in pursuit – Kate finds out that Angel is a vampire.
12	12	"Expecting"	David Semel	Howard Gordon	January 25, 2000	1ADH12	6.62
After sleeping with a photographer she had seen a few times, Cordelia wakes up to find herself extremely pregnant; she and several other women are carrying the spawn of a Haxil Beast that uses men as sexual surrogates. Angel and Wesley must find a way to break the demon's psychic control over its human incubators before they deliver - an ordeal likely to be lethal to the hosts.
13	13	"She"	David Greenwalt	David Greenwalt & Marti Noxon	February 8, 2000	1ADH13	5.25
Angel joins forces with Jhiera, a demon princess on a desperate mission to rescue enslaved women escaping from a home dimension where the men exert absolute control over the women by mutilating them with a spinal lobotomy when each comes of age.
14	14	"I've Got You Under My Skin"	R.D. Price	Story by : David Greenwalt & Jeannine Renshaw; Teleplay by : Jeannine Renshaw	February 15, 2000	1ADH14	4.66
Cordelia has a vision about an ancient Ethros demon, which turns out to have been possessing a young boy, Ryan Anderson, for years. Angel, Wesley and Cordelia perform an exorcism that expels the demon from the child, but it escapes the trap they set and roams free to possess once more. Even worse, they learn that the mass-murdering Ethros demon does not pose the biggest threat to the Anderson family's well-being, their son Ryan is evil in his own right, the Ethros demon had been trying to escape from the boy. The boy then sets fire to the home trying to kill his family.
15	15	"The Prodigal"	Bruce Seth Green	Tim Minear	February 22, 2000	1ADH15	5.45
Angel learns that Kate's father has been spending his retirement as a mule for a syndicate of demon drug-runners. In response to investigative pressure from Angel, the demon drug lord orders Kate's father killed. The investigation causes Angel to have flashbacks to the difficult relationship with his own father and their final confrontation. Vampires kill Kate's father and she then joins Angel in killing those responsible.
16	16	"The Ring"	Nick Marck	Howard Gordon	February 29, 2000	1ADH16	5.21
A man comes to Angel Investigations asking them to find his brother, but it is just a ruse to trap Angel, who is then forced to become a gladiator in a clandestine fight club. His only escape is to kill 21 demon opponents or rely on Cordelia Chase and Wesley Wyndam-Pryce to save him. This episode introduces Lilah Morgan of Wolfram & Hart.
17	17	"Eternity"	Regis B. Kimble	Tracey Stern	April 4, 2000	1ADH17	4.85
When a fading actress Rebecca enlists Angel to protect her from a stalker, she discovers that he is a vampire and begs him to make her eternally young too. She drugs Angel to make him more agreeable to her request. However, the drug-induced euphoria reverts Angel to evil Angelus, and he almost kills Rebecca before Wesley and Cordelia arrive to knock him unconscious.
18	18	"Five by Five"	James A. Contner	Jim Kouf	April 25, 2000	1ADH18	4.83
Rogue Slayer Faith comes to town and three associates at Wolfram & Hart hire her to assassinate Angel in exchange for getting all criminal charges against her dropped. Faith agrees but it becomes clear to Angel that Faith has plans of her own; she kidnaps and tortures Wesley. Episodes contains flashbacks of when Angel got his soul. Angel realizes that Faith needs help.
19	19	"Sanctuary"	Michael Lange	Tim Minear & Joss Whedon	May 2, 2000	1ADH19	5.29
Buffy comes to L.A. to stop Faith and is shocked to discover Angel is attempting to redeem Faith's violent nature, and Wesley is faced with a crisis of loyalties when the Watcher's Council assassins offer him reinstatement if he gives Faith over to them. Also, evil Wolfram & Hart lawyer Lindsey approaches Kate to help them take revenge on Faith and Angel. Nonetheless, Angel continues to help Faith even as Buffy, the Watcher's Council, and the LAPD try to take her down. Faith hands herself in to the police.
20	20	"War Zone"	David Straiton	Garry Campbell	May 9, 2000	1ADH20	4.92
When Angel tracks down millionaire David Nabbit's blackmailer, he finds himself in the middle of a gang war between a group of street kids – led by amateur vampire hunter Charles Gunn – and a vampire gang who have settled in his South-Central neighborhood. Angel offers to assist Gunn in tracking down the vampires who abducted and killed Gunn's sister.
21	21	"Blind Date"	Thomas J. Wright	Jeannine Renshaw	May 16, 2000	1ADH21	5.14
Lindsey helps Angel break into Wolfram & Hart to prevent a blind assassin from carrying out her deadly mission, which is to kill three children who when they grow up will pose a threat to Wolfram & Hart. While Angel is in Wolfram & Hart he comes across a scroll to which he feels a weird connection, so he steals it. Wesley discovers the scroll is The Prophecies of Aberjian and discovers that some of the text deals with Angel and his place in the world.
22	22	"To Shanshu in L.A."	David Greenwalt	David Greenwalt	May 23, 2000	1ADH22	4.52
Wolfram & Hart raises a powerful warrior demon, Vocah, to sever Angel's connections to the Powers. Then, using an incantation from the ancient scroll that Angel stole from Wolfram & Hart, the evil law firm raises an even more powerful adversary. Vocah inundates Cordelia with visions, putting her in a coma, and the only way to save her is with the words of Anatole, from the scroll. Angel gets the scroll back by cutting off Lindsay's hand. The episode ends showing the demon who Wolfram & Hart have raised to defeat Angel - Angel’s sire, Darla.

=== Crossovers with Buffy the Vampire Slayer ===
Beginning with this season, both Angel and its parent series Buffy the Vampire Slayer aired on The WB Television Network. Both shows aired on Tuesdays, Buffy at 8:00 PM ET, and Angel at 9:00 PM ET. The first season of Angel aired along with the fourth season of Buffy. Both shows would feature crossover episodes where characters would appear on the other show. Along with the title character Angel (David Boreanaz), Cordelia Chase (Charisma Carpenter) appeared as main characters on the new series.

The first crossover appeared in the premiere episodes, where Angel calls Buffy but doesn't say anything; on Buffy, she answers the phone. After the events of the Buffy episode "The Harsh Light of Day", Oz (Seth Green) visits Los Angeles in "In the Dark" to give Angel the Gem of Amarra (a ring that makes a vampire invincible). Spike (James Marsters) also appears in both episodes.

In "The Bachelor Party", Doyle (Glenn Quinn) has a vision of Buffy in danger. This causes Angel to secretly visit Sunnydale in the Buffy episode "Pangs", to protect her. After Buffy is made aware that he was in town, Buffy (Sarah Michelle Gellar) visits L.A. in "I Will Remember You" to express her displeasure in him visiting but not telling her.

Buffy season three recurring character Wesley Wyndam-Pryce (Alexis Denisof) makes his first appearance on Angel in "Parting Gifts" and would later become a main character for the remainder of the series.

After the events of the two-part Buffy episodes "This Year's Girl" and "Who Are You?", Faith (Eliza Dushku) leaves Sunnydale and goes to L.A. in the Angel two-part episode "Five by Five" and "Sanctuary" and is hired by Wolfram & Hart to kill Angel. Buffy makes her second and final appearance on Angel in "Sanctuary".

Angel visits Sunnydale again in the Buffy episode "The Yoko Factor" to apologize to Buffy after the way he treated her in "Sanctuary." Angel has a tense confrontation with Buffy's new boyfriend, Riley Finn (Marc Blucas).

Buffy recurring character, the vampire Darla (Julie Benz), who was killed in the Buffy episode "Angel" is resurrected by Wolfram & Hart in the season one finale, "To Shanshu in L.A.".

=== Unproduced episode ===
The original second episode was supposed to be "Corrupt", an episode written by David Fury. The episode featured the introduction of Kate Lockley, who was originally going to be an undercover cop exploring prostitution who becomes addicted to cocaine and becomes a prostitute in the process of her undercover work. The WB shut down production on the episode before filming as they believed the episode's content was too dark.

== Reception ==
The first season has a 91% approval rating on Rotten Tomatoes based on 46 reviews, with an average rating of 7.4 out of 10. The site's critics consensus reads, "Angel builds on the solid sex appeal of its lead, forging an unexpectedly worthy spinoff that draws viewers in with character depth, clever humor, and a suitably dark and brooding backdrop."

On Metacritic, the season scored 75 out of 100, based on 20 reviews, indicating "generally favorable" reviews.

David Boreanaz won the Saturn Award for Best Actor on Television, while the show was nominated for Best Network Television Series and Charisma Carpenter was nominated for Best Supporting Actress on Television. The show also received its only Emmy Award nomination, for Outstanding Makeup for a Series for the episode "The Ring".

The Futon Critic named "Five by Five" the 10th best episode of 2000.

The first season averaged 4.8 million viewers.

== DVD release ==
Angel: The Complete First Season was released on DVD in region 1 on February 11, 2003 and in region 2 on December 10, 2001. The DVD includes all 22 episodes on 6 discs presented in full frame 1.33:1 aspect ratio. Special features on the DVD include two commentary tracks—"City of" by creators Joss Whedon and David Greenwalt and "Rm w/a Vu" by writer Jane Espenson. Scripts for "Five by Five" and "Sanctuary" are included. Featurettes include, "I'm Cordelia", a showcase of the character with interview with actress Charisma Carpenter; "Introducing Angel", an overview of the conception of the show; "The Demons", which details the various demons featured in the season; and "Season 1 Overview", where cast and crew members discuss the season. Also included are cast biographies and photo galleries.
