= Sense & Sensitivity =

- Angel episode
- Episode no.: Season 1 Episode 6
- Directed by: James A. Contner
- Written by: Tim Minear
- Production code: 1ADH06
- Original air date: November 9, 1999

Guest appearances
- Elisabeth Röhm as Kate Lockley; John Capodice as Little Tony Papazian; John Mahon as Trevor Lockley; Ron Marasco as Allen Lloyd; Alex Skuby as Harlan; Kevin Will as Heath; Thomas Burr as Lee Mercer; Ken Abraham as Spivey; Jimmy Shubert as Johnny Red; Ken Grantham as Lieutenant; Adam Donshik as Uniform Cop #1; Kevin E. West as Uniform Cop #2; Wilson Bell as Uniform Cop #3; Colin Patrick Lynch as Beat Cop; Steve Schirripa as Henchman; Christopher Paul Hart as Traffic Cop

Episode chronology
| ← Previous "Rm w/a Vu" | Next → "Bachelor Party" |
- Angel season 1

"Sense & Sensitivity" is the 6th episode of the first season of the American television series Angel. Written by Tim Minear and directed by James A. Contner, it was originally broadcast on November 9, 1999 on the WB network. In this episode, Kate arrests mobster and murder suspect, Little Tony Papazian, whose Wolfram & Hart lawyer coerces Kate's department into attending sensitivity training. This causes the entire precinct to become emotionally unglued, allowing Papazian and the other inmates to escape from their cells. When Little Tony attempts to kill Kate, Angel – also rendered overly sensitive by the curse – comes to her rescue.

== Plot ==
Detective Kate Lockley struggles unsuccessfully to locate mob boss Anthony Papazian, also known as "Little Tony." She goes to Angel Investigations and offers Angel the job of finding Little Tony. He agrees, and she instructs him to withdraw to safety after he calls her with Little Tony's location because she doesn't want to get him killed.

Kate’s father, Trevor Lockley, comes to the police station. This is a surprise to Kate, but her father didn't intend to see her there. Both clearly uncomfortable, she tells him she'll say a few words at his retirement party his friends are throwing at The Blue Bar in a few days. Angel's phone call interrupts their conversation; he has located Little Tony on a pier in San Pedro. Though Kate told him to get out of there, Angel sees a yacht coming to pick up Little Tony and takes matters into his own hands. He pretends to be a tourist who thinks the boat is going to Catalina, then takes out Little Tony's two goons just in time for the police to arrive and catch Little Tony before he takes off. Kate lectures Angel for not leaving when she told him to, even though Papazian was getting away.

Papazian's Wolfram & Hart lawyer, Lee Mercer, comes to the station and petitions to have Little Tony transferred to another facility, claiming that his client was mistreated and abused by the police and by an "as yet unnamed assailant" possibly working with Kate. Meanwhile, at Angel Investigations, Cordelia congratulates Angel on completing such a straightforward job, but Angel thinks Little Tony is planning something. Doyle reports that Angel's intuition for evil is spot on: Little Tony "is" planning something.

Kate heads to The Blue Bar after work, where a number of fellow officers and even her father congratulate her on finally apprehending Little Tony. Not long after, her co-worker Harlan comes by their table to show her a memo about a mandatory "sensitivity training" seminar that they are all required to attend because of the way she treated Little Tony. The next day at the station, the seminar begins. Allen Lloyd meets with Lee Mercer and reports their plan will yield results after just one more session.

Meanwhile, Angel interrogates Allen, who hits him with the talking stick. Running into the precinct, Kate calls forlornly for her father, who is no longer there, then stares around at her coworkers, all pacing, gesticulating, shouting, weeping. Kind-hearted Heath, wishing to establish parity among the inmates, lets them all loose. Similarly, cops all around are demonstrating signs of their newfound sensitivity with muggers, fender benders, and more.

Cordelia and Doyle meet Angel outside the precinct when, sensing their distress about the situation, Angel smiles a big smile, holds open his arms and sing-songs, "O-ka-ay, I think someone needs a hu-ug," and firmly embraces them both. Having been cursed by the talking stick when Allen hit him with it, he refuses to follow Cordelia's order to "get all vampy" to rescue Kate because he knows it makes them uncomfortable. As the three of them try to get into the locked station, Kate waits for a response to the messages she's left on her father’s answering machine, begging him to talk to her. Out of his cell, Little Tony collects an impromptu gang and breaks into the precinct armory. Just as he finds Kate, the AI team arrives. While Angel and Kate try to "reach" Little Tony, Cordelia and Doyle urge Angel to stop talking and fight.

Later, Little Tony calls Mercer, who tells him that the Senior Partners will no longer represent his interests because he threatened a police officer and shot up a precinct in full view of witnesses, and the firm cannot accept that kind of exposure. While they talk, Mercer views a precinct surveillance tape and freezes it on Angel, unmistakable in his black leather coat. At the precinct the next morning, the cops resume their taciturnity with a vengeance. Angel checks in with Kate, and they both say that they don't remember much about events of the night before. Trevor walks away and Kate sits carefully in her chair, holding herself stiffly against the pain.

== Production ==
=== Writing ===
This is the second episode written by Tim Minear - his first script, "Somnambulist," went into production later in the season. Minear says his original idea was of cops who become so sensitive that they were unable to perform their jobs, but after discussing the idea with creator Joss Whedon, it became "something far more interesting than what I had originally pitched," Minear says. "Instead of just super sensitive cops, you have people whose emotions are completely on the surface."

The final scene, in which Kate and her father meet, Minear originally wrote as a "big TV ending where they hug." Whedon suggested that instead, Kate's father acts as though nothing has changed. "If it had gone the other way," Minear says, "I think the whole thing would have collapsed. That’s really Joss knowing best."

Whedon felt that the first edited version was not of a high enough standard to air; Minear helped to re-edit the episode to produce the version that was aired.

=== Acting ===
Writer Tim Minear regrets the actor they cast in the role of mobster Little Tony, saying although John Capodice was "very good", the character was "clichéd...a Sopranos knock off."

=== Music ===
The show uses a "comical pizzicato string trope" described as "slightly bizarre" as the score to signify comedic intent for scenes where the police officers are acting strangely, which was reused for similar scenes in the episodes "I Will Remember You" (1.8) and "Couplet" (3.14).
