= City Of =

Pilot episode of Angel

- Angel episode
- Episode no.: Season 1 Episode 1
- Directed by: Joss Whedon
- Written by: Joss Whedon; David Greenwalt
- Production code: 1ADH01
- Original air date: October 5, 1999

Guest appearances
- Tracy Middendorf as Tina; Vyto Ruginis as Russell Winters; Christian Kane as Lindsey McDonald; Michael Mantell as Oliver Simon; Jon Ingrassia as Stacy; Renee Ridgeley as Margo; Sam Pancake as Manager; Josh Holloway as Vampire; Gina McClain as Janice

Episode chronology
← Previous —	Next → "Lonely Heart"
- Angel season 1

"City Of" is the premiere episode of the first season of the American television series Angel. Written by co-creators Joss Whedon and David Greenwalt and directed by Whedon, it was originally broadcast on October 5, 1999 on the WB network.

Angel (David Boreanaz) was a character in the first three seasons of Buffy the Vampire Slayer. Angel had been a soulless, immortal vampire who was legendary for his evil acts until a band of wronged Romani punished him in the 19th century by restoring his soul, which overwhelmed him with guilt over his past actions. In the third-season finale, Angel leaves to go to Los Angeles to get away from Buffy, whom he loves but can never be with. In Los Angeles, he meets Doyle (Glenn Quinn), a half-demon who is sent visions by the Powers That Be about people whom Angel is supposed to rescue from danger. Acting on Doyle's first tip, Angel encounters Cordelia Chase (Charisma Carpenter), who has moved to L.A. from Sunnydale (where Buffy the Vampire Slayer takes place) to pursue a film career. Cordelia convinces Angel that she, Angel and Doyle should start up an agency to help people having supernatural or demonic problems.

== Plot ==
While drowning his sorrows at the bar of a dive in downtown Los Angeles, Angel notices three guys leave the bar with two women. Angel follows them to a dark alley, where he kills the three men, who are revealed to be vampires. One of the frightened girls, Janice, bleeding from a minor head wound, tries to thank him, but Angel, fixated on the blood, warns them harshly to get away from him and strides down the dark alley.

Angel makes his way to his new home, a basement apartment beneath a ground-floor office, where he finds Doyle waiting for him. Doyle introduces himself, explaining he is half human, half demon, then recaps the story of Angel's life, ending with his recent breakup with the Slayer and his move to L.A. Doyle explains that Angel's isolation, combined with the fact that he recently drank human blood, puts him at serious risk of relapse. Doyle gets visions from The Powers That Be (accompanied by debilitating headaches) regarding people whose lives Angel must touch; true redemption lies not just in saving lives but in saving souls as well. Doyle concludes by handing over a scrap of paper on which he has jotted information about a young woman named Tina. When Angel asks why Tina needs him, Doyle replies that getting involved in her life enough to figure that out is Angel's first order of business.

Angel finds Tina during her shift and persuades her to meet him after work. Waiting by his car, Angel is surprised to see her in an elegant evening dress and even more surprised when she pulls pepper spray from her purse. Tina accuses Angel of being employed by someone named Russell Winters, but he convinces her to accept his offer of a lift to the "fabulous Hollywood party" she plans to attend. When they arrive, Angel runs into Cordelia Chase, whom he last saw at her graduation ceremony at Sunnydale High months earlier. After Cordelia brags about how successful she is, she leaves to talk to "people that are somebody.” Angel sees a man harassing Tina and asks about him. She tells him that he is Stacy, a creep, and she would like to leave. On their way into the parking garage, Angel fights off Stacy and his goons.

Meanwhile, in her dingy apartment, Cordelia hangs up her one dress and nibbles snacks she stole from the party because she could not afford food while listening to her talent agent's discouraging phone message. After Tina falls asleep, Angel spends the night on the public library's computers, searching for information about Tina's friend Denise, who disappeared after becoming involved with Russell. The next morning, Angel tells Tina he believes her friend Denise was murdered. As she listens, Tina spots Doyle's note listing her name and workplace, and, convinced afresh that Angel has been running some scam for Russell, panics and runs. Angel tries to grab her at the building's entrance, but sunlight burns his hand, causing him to turn vampiric reflexively. In stark terror, Tina flees.

Russell Winters, a multi-millionaire businessman, finds Tina when she returns to her apartment to pack. She allows herself to be drawn into his arms; however, Russell is a vampire and bites her. Angel races to the rescue, only to find Tina dead, marks of vampire predation on her throat.

Later that day at his heavily guarded mansion, Russell meets with a young lawyer from the evil law firm of Wolfram & Hart to discuss his airtight (fictitious) alibi in the matter of Tina's demise. Russell orders the lawyer to bring him Cordelia, whom he has selected as his next victim.

Angel tracks down Stacy and interrogates him until he reveals Russell's location, then persuades Doyle to help him avenge Tina's death. Excited by her limo ride to meet the Russell Winters, Cordelia is impressed by his ornate mansion. After a servant ushers her into Russell's den, Cordelia spills the story of her life to her host - until she notices the unusually heavy drapes and lack of mirrors and concludes aloud that Winters is a vampire. Winters vamps and reaches for Cordelia, who flees. Angel arrives and rescues her.

The next day, Angel stalks into a conference room at the heavily guarded Russell Winters Enterprises building, where Russell is conducting a meeting with his business associates and the Wolfram & Hart lawyer. Unimpressed by Russell's claim that he can do whatever he wants and get away with it, Angel asks the CEO if he can fly, then kicks his chair through the windows. Exposed to sunlight, Russell bursts into flames and disintegrates into dust. As Angel departs, the lawyer uses his cell phone to casually report to his firm to set up an inter-office board meeting that afternoon and that although the firm's "Senior Partners" need not be disturbed by the issue just yet, there seems to be a "new player in town".

Back at home, Angel despondently calls Buffy, but when he hears her voice, hangs up without speaking. Later, Cordelia proposes that they go into the business of saving souls as a team— at least until her acting career materializes. As Doyle observes that many people in L.A. need help, Angel stands atop a skyscraper, looking out over the L.A. nightscape.

== Production ==
The vampire prosthetics were a newly created prototype design for this episode, as the production team wanted to try a darker, scarier look. However, they were unhappy with the effect and soon returned to Buffy-style vamp-faces.

=== Writing ===
In the original script, the scene in which Angel finds Tina's dead body ends with him cradling her, and then licking her blood from his fingers. Although creator Joss Whedon claims that moment was the point of the episode, as it shows how Angel is struggling with his goal of redemption, it was ultimately cut. "It was dark enough that he didn’t save this girl," says supervising producer Tim Minear. "I don’t think you needed him licking her dead body." A similar scene occurs in flashback in Season Four, where Angelus reveals this caused Angel to revert to the pathetic state he is in when Whistler encounters him eating rats in 1996.

=== Music ===
In his essay on music as a narrative agent, Matthew Mills points out how the theme used for the character of Angel is used multiple times in this episode, at different tempos and by different instruments. When Doyle first offers Angel a chance of redemption, his theme starts but does not end; its "incompleteness mirroring Angel's inability to answer Doyle's question". When Angel finally accepts Doyle's challenge at the end of the episode, his theme plays with a "brief respite from minor tonality" to underscore his newfound determination.

== Novelization ==
The episode has been novelized by Nancy Holder. The novel City of was published in 1999 and translated into French (La Cité des Anges), German (Stadt der Träume) and Brazilian Portuguese (Bem-Vindo a Los Angeles).

- Nancy Holder: Angel: City of. Simon Spotlight Entertainment ISBN 9780671041441

== Reception ==
Salon.com cautiously praised Angel for merging the two genres - film noir and the superhero graphic novel - that best showcase Angel's "wounded, night-crawling loner mystique", but worried that Angel's new mission was overly sentimental: "Is the show going to turn into Touched by Angel?"
