= She (Angel) =

- Angel episode
- Episode no.: Season 1 Episode 13
- Directed by: David Greenwalt
- Written by: David Greenwalt; Marti Noxon
- Production code: 1ADH13
- Original air date: February 8, 2000

Guest appearances
- Bai Ling as Jhiera; Colby French as Tae; Heather Stephens as Shari; Sean Gunn as Mars; Tracey Costello as Laura; André L. Roberson as Diego; P. J. Marino as Peter Wilkers; Honor Bliss as Girl; Chris Durand as Demon Henchman #1; Alison Simpson as Demon Girl #1; Lucas Dudley as Security Guard

Episode chronology
← Previous "Expecting"	Next → "I've Got You Under My Skin"
- Angel season 1

"She" is the 13th episode of the first season of the American television series Angel. Written by Marti Noxon and directed by David Greenwalt, it was originally broadcast on February 8, 2000 on the WB network. In She, Angel joins forces with Jhiera, a demon princess on a desperate mission to rescue enslaved women escaping from a home dimension where the men exert absolute control over the women by mutilating them with a spinal lobotomy when each comes of age. After the showdown at a health spa where Jhiera has set up a sanctuary for her fellow refugees, Angel confronts the arrogant princess about her cavalier disregard for the safety of humans, specifically Cordelia and Wesley. Acknowledging each other as self-appointed champions of the helpless, the two demons achieve mutual understanding before parting ways.

== Plot ==
At a party in Cordelia's new apartment, Angel is feeling awkward around the women who are interested in him there. Meanwhile, a man standing watch at an ice factory hears spooky voices crying from inside the coffin-sized crate he's guarding. Believing there is someone alive and suffering inside, he breaks open the box, then stands staring in shock at its contents.

Angel offers Wesley a staff position at Angel Investigations, a move which Cordelia heartily approves. However, Cordelia suddenly receives a graphic vision of a man being burned alive from the inside at an ice factory. Since it is still daytime, Wesley drives Angel to the scene. Inside the facility, Angel finds the incinerated corpse as well as the crate he was guarding, now containing only ice. In the corpse’s pocket, Angel finds a business card for Peter Wilkers Private Security, which he pockets. Hearing a noise from another section of the factory, Angel discovers the presence of a humanoid demon named Tae, who reveals that he is from another dimension, sent to bring back the vicious demon, a "vessel of pure rage," which has escaped from his realm into an unsuspecting L.A.

Angel goes to the office of Peter Wilkers Private Security and finds an envelope containing an invoice for Jericho Ice and a large amount of cash. Angel is surprised by the sudden appearance of an attractive female demon who effortlessly knocks him out of the way and scorches his arm. Receiving a call on her cell phone, the demon leaves hastily, pulls up her hood over her head, and climbs into her vehicle. Angel gives chase and calls Cordelia to describe the demon's appearance so she and Wesley can begin their research. Angel follows her to an art gallery but she sets museum security after him. Angel thwarts the security guards by acting as a museum guide.

In a storage room at the back of the gallery, the demon stands staring into space, then turns when Angel comes in behind her. She orders him to leave but at that moment, wind, lightning, and thunder spring from nowhere. A swirling portal forms, the shrieking coming from it seeming to draw rapidly closer. A naked humanoid girl drops out of the portal and hits the floor hard. As Angel pulls over a tarp to cover her, he gets a brief but clear glimpse of the girl's smooth forehead and of the raised ridges running along her upper spine. At that moment, Tae and his all-male team break into the room armed with kama weapons. The female demon and Angel battle furiously, but Tae abducts the newly arrived girl and drives away with her. Looking helplessly after the speeding vehicle, Angel asks the female demon what will happen to the girl and learns that she will be "unmade." The male demons take the frightened girl to their base where, without further ado, they use a special clamping tool to cut out the raised ridges extending down from the girl's nape to between her shoulder blades. Gone breathless with fear, the girl screams in agony at the first cut.

Back at Angel's apartment, he brings his wary guest a bandage for the shallow cut on her arm while she drapes her cardigan over a railing and takes a look around. In response to her challenge that vampires are known killers, Angel tells her he was cursed, then evades her skeptical theory that he's been "cursed to help people," focusing the inquiry on her situation instead. The exotically beautiful demon accepts Angel's invitation to tell her story and introduces herself as Jhiera, a princess from the Oden Tal dimension, dedicated to helping other female refugees escape her home world to the relative safety of L.A. Jhiera tells Angel that for the women of Oden Tal, the personality is located in an area of the body called the "ko," the source of their desires and passions. At this, Jhiera turns her back to Angel and shows him the raised ridges running for several inches along her spine. Angel, who found Jhiera attractive at first sight, is now deeply aroused by her nearness and bends his head closer to her vulnerable neck. Resisting his own desires, he listens as Jhiera tells him that the men of her dimension control the women by cutting out the ko, thus removing their "physical and sexual power," their volition. "We leave behind dreaming," she tells him bleakly. Feeling herself at the center of his intense predator's focus, Jhiera begins to circle Angel as she explains that young women of Oden Tal must learn to control the raw power of their maturing ko, to which men of this world respond involuntarily. She tells him of her own struggle, with the help of the frozen water, to contain the "heat under her skin." Jhiera proceeds to demonstrate her power to arouse them both, as well as her iron control of that power. Angel, fighting on several levels for self-control, moves a few steps away and asks pointedly about the incinerated corpse at the ice factory, and about the other four men crisped to death over the past year. Jhiera grows defensive of her manifesto and starts to storm off, but Angel blocks her path. Her power flashes to the surface and they are almost irresistibly drawn to each other – a connection lethal to Angel – until Jhiera damps the intensity of her radiant heat. Telling him again to stay out of her way, she escapes, leaving him wrung out, barely able to stand.

While Angel and Jhiera fight Tae's team at the art gallery, Wesley continues his research and discovers that the men of this demon species are called the Vigories of Oden Tal. Reading from an ancient volume, he tells Cordelia that the Vigories are said to be fierce warriors, and "the women live enslaved to them." Also learning that the Vigories are herbivores and must eat half their weight in partially rotted vegetation each day, Cordelia and Wesley leave the office to go looking for compost. They find Tae's team headquartered in a large plant nursery and overhear a briefing about their plans to capture Princess Jhiera, cut her, and take her back to Oden Tal to signal the end of all rebellion. The girl who arrived through the portal at the museum is shown – her top ridges cut – and Tae refers to her as "it" (the pronoun Vigories use for women is "it" rather than "her") while suggesting "it" will enjoy going home. The girl – compliant and seemingly void of all personality - agrees. Jhiera, meanwhile, returns to the sanctuary she has created at the Palm Ridge Spa, where the other young women are being kept, rendered safe by lying in whirlpool tubs filled with ice. Jhiera informs the spa's proprietor, Mars, that this sanctuary has been compromised and the girls must be moved to another, safer location. However, unaware that Tae is right on her tail, Jhiera tells Mars they will leave the following day. In the meantime, unable to raise their boss by cell phone, Cordelia and Wesley barely escape detection at the Vigories' base and return to Angel's apartment both to locate him and seek his help. They find him, apparently unharmed and unconcerned, just emerging from the shower. Upon hearing their report that Tae's group plans an assault on an undisclosed location that recently started receiving large shipments of ice, Angel remembers the address listed on the invoice he lifted from Wilkers' office. Grimly determined to get there first, Angel gathers his team and heads to the Palm Ridge Spa.

Arriving at the spa, Angel leaves Cordelia and Wesley (who falls down getting out of the car) to act as lookouts. Angel brushes past Mars and, finding Jhiera with the still-somnolent girls, tells her that Tae is closer behind than she thinks. At that moment, Cordelia frantically rushes in to report Tae's approach. While Cordelia and Wesley are still rousing the girls and trying to get them moving toward the back exit, Tae and his team burst in. Cordy and Wes continue with the evacuation, while Jhiera and Angel engage Tae and his men in battle. The two demons manage to hold their own until Wesley and Cordelia, returning to the fight after securing the girls, are suddenly taken hostage. When presented with Tae's ultimatum to hand over the refugees or see the humans die, Jhiera, hardly hesitating, says, "Then they die." As she wheels for the exit, Cordelia and Wesley seize the initiative and break away from their captors, who seem momentarily stunned at the failure of their ploy. Outside, Jhiera makes her way towards the cab of the truck loaded with crates of ice-packed refugee girls. She is just steps away from freedom when two of the Vigories grab her from behind and restrain her for Tae, making sure that her ko is exposed. Jhiera's nemesis holds up the cutting tool and prepares to mutilate the Princess of Oden Tal to bring her under immediate control. Appearing out of nowhere, Angel grabs Tae in a headlock and, giving him a couple of demonstrative squeezes, threatens to snap their leader's neck unless the Vigories holding Jhiera release her. As soon as they do, Angel tells Jhiera to get the girls to safety. Giving Angel a slight nod, she climbs into the cab of the truck and drives away. As soon as Jhiera is out of sight, Angel releases Tae and tells him to go back to Oden Tal, morphing into vamp face to let the Vigories know he can make good on his promise of mayhem if they continue their war in this dimension.

The next day, Angel arrives in the office first and squeezes a bag of whole coffee beans to test Cordelia's theory that he can effectively grind the coffee with his "vampire strength." The bag bursts, scattering coffee beans everywhere, just as Cordelia and Wesley come in the front door. Wesley immediately slips and falls, then starts to sweep the beans up with his bare hands, apologizing distractedly for making a mess. In what appears to be a natural segue for him, Wesley also apologizes, as he carefully regains his feet, for being taken hostage by Tae's men. Angel tries to reassure his friend and compliments him on a job well done, which prompts Wesley, in turn, to express his sincere regard for Angel. Cordelia is just teasing Wesley for turning groveling into an art, when Jhiera walks in. Cordelia opens verbal fire on the warrior demon, asking if they can offer her anything, such as a couple of hostages to let die. Angel firmly shows Jhiera into his office and closes the door. After ascertaining that the other women are safe, away from the city, Angel again tells Jhiera that he'll stop her if she crosses the line and endangers people of his world while trying to protect people from hers. The sexual and political tension thick between them, Jhiera looks at Angel, then agrees with his terms. She hesitates, clearly torn, clearly having found a "desirable mate," and Angel grows even more breathless. With the harsh discipline of an abnegation as rigid and as necessary as Angel's, Jhiera turns toward the door, away from the object of her desire. As she walks away from him, Angel sees what he has already inescapably sensed – Jhiera's ko glows red hot. Raging desire at war with self-preservation, Angel stands desperately immobile until she is out of range.

== Acting ==
Bai Ling, who played Jhiera, said of her character:

[She's] so cool. She seduced Angel, and yet she's very dangerous and independent. She's got all those things that a modern woman wants, yet she's a princess. She has her own duty to do good things for the people in her land. She's got all this complexity and beauty.

According to Ling, the character was once considered for a return:

After that episode aired, David [Greenwalt] called me. They were so pleased by it, they wanted me to come back. I'd very much like to go back to Angel, because we all had a great time, and they loved the character. I don't know what the schedule is; I guess they're still working on it, so we're gonna talk about it when it is ready. I'm looking forward to contributing something.

== Production details ==
=== Writing ===
Writer Tim Minear had originally put the dance David Boreanaz performs in his imagination into "Sense & Sensitivity" but removed it on Joss Whedon's request; "Plus," Minear says, "we wanted to save it until it was just right. Here's this guy who looks like this, and he's a complete social retard. I think we've had a lot of success playing that aspect of the character." Instead of the black screen, the ending credits are superimposed over a reprise of Angel's and Wesley's dance routines.
