= Rm w/a Vu =

- Angel episode
- Cordelia is not alone in her new apartment.
- Episode no.: Season 1 Episode 5
- Directed by: Scott McGinnis
- Story by: Jane Espenson; David Greenwalt
- Teleplay by: Jane Espenson
- Production code: 1ADH05
- Original air date: November 2, 1999

Guest appearances
- Elisabeth Röhm as Kate Lockley; Beth Grant as Maude Pearson; Marcus Redmond as Griff; Denny Pierce as Vic; Greg Collins as Keith; Corey Klemow as Young Man; Lara McGrath as Manager; B. J. Porter as Dennis Pearson

Episode chronology
← Previous "I Fall to Pieces"	Next → "Sense & Sensitivity"
- Angel season 1

"Rm w/a Vu" (Room with a View) is the 5th episode of the first season of the American television series Angel. The episode was written by Jane Espenson, with a story from Espenson and David Greenwalt, and directed by Scott McGinnis, it was originally broadcast on November 2, 1999, on the WB network. In Rm w/a Vu, Doyle dodges a demon loan shark, and Cordelia is enchanted with her beautiful rent-controlled apartment even though it turns out to be haunted. Unable to dent Cordelia's determination to live there, the team attempts an exorcism, angering the ghost of the original tenant, who suffered a fatal heart attack immediately after bricking her grown son behind a wall.

== Plot ==
At Angel Investigations, Cordelia is painfully reminded of the unfortunate state of her life. Her acting career is not advancing and she lives in a dank, dirty apartment where the utilities do not work well and cockroaches roam freely. Doyle offers to help Cordelia find a new place, but she is reluctant to accept his help. When she goes home to a floor covered in roaches, she flees and tries to call Doyle, who is visited by a demon who has come to collect Doyle's debt, or to kill him as a message to others if he cannot pay. Doyle manages to escape, unknowingly missing Cordelia's call, so she stops by Angel's apartment to spend the night. Angel is annoyed by Cordelia's messy habits, so agrees to help Doyle deal with his demon trouble if he will help Cordelia find an apartment.

Doyle and Cordelia go apartment hunting and eventually find the perfect apartment. Telling Doyle that the unsightly wall that needs removing adds to its perfection, Cordelia immediately closes the deal. In the meantime, Angel waits at Doyle's apartment until the demon, Griff, shows up. Griff explains that his boss no longer cares about the money, but needs to make an example of Doyle by having him killed. Angel placates him and promises Doyle will pay.

Meanwhile, Cordelia discovers that the apartment is haunted when the music plays by itself. She pluckily tries to scare the ghost away. Angel and Doyle stop by and upon seeing this, carry Cordelia, struggling, out the door, promising to help her perform an exorcism. Angel does not understand why Cordelia is fighting so hard to keep the apartment. She explains that she feels she is being punished with an awful life because of how nasty she was when she was younger. If she can get a nice apartment, then it shows that she will stop being punished.

The team researches the building's history for a clue to the ghost's identity. The evidence points to Maude Pearson, builder, owner and first resident of the Pearson Arms building. While Doyle goes to pick up the arcane supplies for the exorcism, Angel finds out from Detective Kate Lockley that Maude Pearson died suddenly of a heart attack, and her son Dennis, with whom she was fighting because she disapproved of his fiancée, vanished afterwards. It seems clear to Angel: the son killed his mother, then skipped town with his girlfriend. Angel then learns that while there have never been any murders reported in the apartment, there has been a long string of suicides there.

The ghost lures Cordelia back to the apartment by imitating Angel's own voice, and Angel and Doyle, realizing what has happened, rush to the apartment. At the apartment, Cordelia is being attacked by Maude and begins to reach the point of emotional collapse under Maude's spate of abuse, targeting Cordelia's feelings of worthlessness. Doyle and Angel arrive just in time to rescue Cordelia, whom the ghost has hung by the neck with the chandelier string. They begin the exorcism without Cordelia, who is a sobbing wreck due to Maude tormenting her, but a cyclone of flying debris prevents them from completing the ritual. When the three try to leave, the door suddenly opens to reveal three demons with large guns, determined to kill Doyle. A brawl ensues, while Maude telekinetically pulls Cordelia back into the bedroom to continue torturing her. However, when Maude calls Cordelia a bitch, it reminds Cordelia of her former reputation, and she begins to fight back. She screams at Maude, causing the ghost to temporarily vanish, and then Cordelia proceeds to start to obliterate the disliked apartment wall.

As Angel snaps Griff's neck, the hole Cordelia has made in the wall exposes a rotting skeleton and the presence of a second ghost. In a mystical flashback, the team learns that Maude prevented Dennis from leaving with his fiancée by bricking him alive into this wall. Upon completion, Maude suffered a heart attack and died. She screams as Dennis' ghost attacks, dispersing and banishing his mother's ghost forever.

In the coda, order restored, Angel reminds Doyle that he will need to reveal his background at some point. Meanwhile, Cordelia, who has found her "inner bitch" again, now feels comfortable speaking with her Sunnydale friends about her exciting life in Los Angeles. She affectionately talks about her new roommate "Phantom Dennis", but claims she never "sees" him.

== Production details ==
=== Writing ===
Writer Jane Espenson intended the episode's title to match the format of a classified ad. She also considered "Re: Lease" as a possible title.

The episode is "really all about Cordelia regaining her inner bitch," says supervising producer Tim Minear. He points out that Kate teases Angel for having - like "Popes and rock stars" - only one name; Angel replies, "You got me, I’m the Pope." Later, in "Somnambulist", the serial killer whom Angel suspects may be himself is dubbed "The Pope" by the tabloids. Minear says, "That was completely unintentional...a happy coincidence that worked out wonderfully for the show."

== Reception and reviews ==
Charisma Carpenter lists this episode as one of her personal favorites. The 11th Hour praised this episode, saying Jane Espenson wrote "an obvious masterpiece" by giving the character of Doyle an active role in the plot and playing up Angel's "constant exasperation with Cordelia's occupation" for comic relief.
