= Lonely Hearts (Angel) =

- Angel episode
- Episode no.: Season 1 Episode 2
- Directed by: James A. Contner
- Written by: David Fury
- Production code: 1ADH02
- Original air date: October 12, 1999

Guest appearances
- Elisabeth Röhm as Kate Lockley; Lillian Birdsell as Sharon Richler; Obi Ndefo as Bartender; Derek Hughes as Neil; Johnny Messner as Kevin; Jennifer Tung as Neil Pick-Up Girl; Tracey Stone as Pretty Girl; David Nisic as Slick Guy; Ken Rush as Guy; Connor Kelly as Regular

Episode chronology
← Previous "City Of"	Next → "In the Dark"
- Angel season 1

"Lonely Heart" is the second episode of the first season of the American television series Angel. Written by David Fury and directed by James A. Contner, it was originally broadcast on October 12, 1999 on the WB network. In "Lonely Heart", Angel Investigations looks into a series of killings linked to a trendy L.A. singles club. While there, Angel (David Boreanaz) meets Kate Lockley (Elisabeth Röhm), an LAPD detective also tracking the serial killer - who believes, because of circumstantial evidence, that the murderer is Angel himself. After discovering the murderer is actually a body-hopping demon, Angel seeks Kate's help in tracking down the bartender, now possessed by the demon, and killing him. Kate, believing the bartender committed the murders, accepts a provisional truce with a circumspect Angel.

== Production details ==
Special effects supervisor Loni Peristere explains that to get the effect of the demon burrowing through the characters' bodies, Dave Miller built a prosthetic back to identically match the actor. "We shot the actor doing his action with tracking points, little marks on his back, and I just soft edged, matted and tracked in a locked-off version of the actors back with the burrowing demon and stuck it on there," Peristere says.

David Boreanaz's stunt double, Mike Massa, says the scene in which he is tossed across the room upside down is his favorite stunt of this season. To get the effect, he was shot across the room using an air ram. "The reason I like it so much is because it really knocked the heck out of me," he says. "It was 900 pounds of thrust on the air-ram. I had to hit the corner just right. If I was off, if I hit dead center of the corner with my shoulders spread it could have broken a collarbone. I had to hit it sideways, my back flat to the wall and kind of skip into it, but it just pile drove me right to the ground." Director Jim Contner "was jumping up and down... He thought that was the best stunt he'd ever seen." In that same scene, a cameraman's arm holding a camera can be seen.

In an essay examining the use of cinematic effects of time on Angel, Tammy Kinsey points out Doyle's visions are depicted on film for the first time in this episode. Although short and simple compared to later visions, the quick cuts and flashes of light establish the aesthetic approach of Angel compared to the more conventionally filmed Buffy.

=== Writing ===
David Fury wrote this episode to replace his original script, titled "Corrupt", which also introduces the character of Kate. However, in Fury's first script, Kate had a crack cocaine addiction and worked undercover as a prostitute. Producer Tim Minear says the episode was "a little bit too hopeless, a little too grim"; after the WB Network rejected the episode it was completely rewritten.

=== Title ===
Several sources, including various DVD releases and scripts online, conflict on whether the title of the episode is "Lonely Heart" or "Lonely Hearts." However, David Fury confirmed that the episode is in fact called "Lonely Heart" and explained it can refer to any one of the central characters.
