= Ram air =

Ram air refers to the principle of using the airflow created by a moving object to increase ambient pressure, known as ram pressure. Often, the purpose of a ram air system is to increase an engine's power.

The term "ram air" may also refer to:

- Parafoils, also called ram air parachutes, non-rigid airfoils inflated by wind
- Ram-air intake – an air intake system that aids in engine performance and cooling, commonly used on aircraft and other high-performance vehicles
  - Pontiac "Ram Air" Engines -- a line of performance oriented engines developed in the 1960s and 1970s by General Motors' Pontiac Motor Division
- Ram air turbine – an air driven turbine used by aircraft to generate power

== See also ==
- Air ram
- RamAir, a student radio station at the University of Bradford
