= Hero (Angel) =

- Angel episode
- Episode no.: Season 1 Episode 9
- Directed by: Tucker Gates
- Written by: Tim Minear; Howard Gordon
- Production code: 1ADH09
- Original air date: November 30, 1999

Guest appearances
- Tony Denman as Rieff; Anthony Cistaro as Trask; Michelle Horn as Rayna; Lee Arenberg as Tiernan; Sean Gunn as Lucas; James Henriksen as Elder Lister Demon; David Bickford as Cargo Inspector; Christopher Comes as Storm Trooper #2; Paul O'Brien as Captain; Ashley Taylor as First Mate

Episode chronology
← Previous "I Will Remember You"	Next → "Parting Gifts"
- Angel season 1

"Hero" is the 9th episode of the first season of the American television series Angel. Written by Tim Minear and Howard Gordon and directed by Tucker Gates, it was originally broadcast on November 30, 1999 on the WB television network. In "Hero", Angel joins Doyle’s crusade to save a group of part-human Lister demons from The Scourge, an army of supremacist stormtrooper demons who claim "pure" blood and consequently persecute those of "mixed" blood. While Doyle goes after a strayed Lister teen and Cordelia handles details of the escape plan, Angel infiltrates the enemy and discovers their secret weapon, a bomb-like device called the Beacon that combusts anyone with any taint of human blood. Events lead to a climactic showdown aboard a tramp freighter, where Doyle finally confesses his half-demon heritage—and his love for her—to Cordelia, and proves that he, like Angel, is a Champion in his own right.

== Plot ==
Cordelia pitches Angel an idea for a commercial, but he is skeptical. She then films Doyle, who is uncomfortable and awkward on camera. Cordelia is frustrated with Angel’s brooding, so Doyle volunteers to talk to him. Angel tells Doyle how he sacrificed his humanity and happiness with Buffy in order to be able to continue fighting evil; Doyle commends Angel’s heroism and avers that he himself lacks that strength, as he cannot even ask out, or be truthful with, Cordelia. Later, Doyle is about to tell Cordelia his secret when he has a vision. Arriving on the scene of the vision, Angel and Doyle find a group of Lister demon refugees hiding who hail Angel as their “Promised One.” They are being pursued by The Scourge, a stormtrooper army of pure-blood demons who hate all demons of mixed blood. Doyle tells Angel about a similar incident in his past, in which he failed to help others of his own kind who were being hunted by The Scourge: unprotected, they were massacred.

Angel’s team arranges passage for the Listers on a cargo ship. Rieff, a Lister who is skeptical of Angel, takes off alone; Doyle pursues him and persuades him to return, but The Scourge approach. Doyle and Angel create a diversion, resulting in Angel pretending to join The Scourge. Angel learns that they have a human blood-specific WMD, the Beacon, and that the cargo ship ’s first mate has betrayed them. When the Listers board the ship one of them unwittingly reveals to Cordelia that Doyle is half-demon. When Doyle arrives with Rieff, Cordelia admonishes him for having withheld that and tells him to ask her out.

Angel arrives, warning of the impending attack and the first mate’s betrayal. The Listers secure themselves in the ship’s hold while Angel fights. He cannot prevent The Scourge from lowering the Beacon into the hold, and with the hatches locked from the outside, the Listers and Angel’s team are trapped. Angel prepares to defuse the Beacon, knowing it will be suicide. As they say goodbye, Doyle echoes Angel’s earlier words about heroism and then knocks him to the bottom of the hold. He kisses Cordelia and a purple light passes from his mouth to hers. He jumps onto the Beacon and, as it disintegrates his body, unplugs it, saving everyone else. Later, Angel and Cordelia watch Doyle’s commercial.

== Production details ==
Special effects Supervisor Loni Peristere explains David Greenwalt described his vision of Doyle's death as "I want him to melt to death...I want his flesh to melt off and muscle and then bones." Peristere was concerned that that effect would be too graphic for television. He shot Doyle in his demon form, and Doyle with half-burned make-up then used matte elements to digitally "chew through his skin", including an element of acetone poured on Styrofoam.

== Reception and reviews ==
This episode was rated as one of the series' top five episodes in a poll done by Angel Magazine. It also appeared eight on Slayage.com's list of the top 10 episodes of Angel.
