= I Will Remember You (Angel) =

- Angel episode
- Episode no.: Season 1 Episode 8
- Directed by: David Grossman
- Written by: David Greenwalt; Jeannine Renshaw
- Production code: 1ADH08
- Original air date: November 23, 1999

Guest appearances
- Sarah Michelle Gellar as Buffy Summers; Carey Cannon as Female Oracle; Randall Slavin as Male Oracle; David Wald as Mohra Demon #1; Chris Durand as Mohra Demon #2

Episode chronology
← Previous "Bachelor Party"	Next → "Hero"
- Angel season 1

"I Will Remember You" is the 8th episode of the first season of the American television series Angel, originally broadcast on the WB network. In this episode, Buffy follows Angel back to Los Angeles, where she confronts him about his surreptitious assistance back in Sunnydale. They are attacked by a Mohra demon; when Angel kills the demon he is restored to life by its powerful blood. After The Oracles — a link to The Powers That Be — confirm he is human again, Angel and Buffy spend a blissful night together. When Doyle receives a vision that the Mohra has regenerated itself, Angel leaves to kill the demon for good. In the ensuing battle, Angel discovers the consequences of having only human strength; Buffy must come to his rescue and slay the demon herself. Angel returns to The Oracles, who agree to turn back time so that Angel, accepting the entire cost of the bargain, can kill the Mohra before its blood makes him human. This episode is #78 on the TV Guide list of TV's Top 100 Episodes of all time.

== Plot ==
Buffy surprises Angel with a visit to Los Angeles. Their emotion-driven discussion is interrupted by the arrival of a Mohra demon. Angel stabs the demon, but it retreats to the sewers. Buffy and Angel hesitantly follow, discussing their future as a couple and their feelings for each other. They split up, and Angel meets the demon on his route. As they fight, the Mohra demon cuts Angel. Angel kills the demon, and its blood, eventually found to be the Blood of Eternity, merges with his own, making him human.

Realizing what this means for their relationship, Angel spends the night with Buffy. However, Doyle shares the news that the Mohra demon is alive: the demon's rejuvenating blood also worked on itself. So, Angel sets out with Doyle to kill the demon, without Buffy's much-needed supernatural assistance. Angel fails miserably until Buffy shows up and slays the demon. Angel realizes how useless he is in his human form, and asks the Oracles to turn back time to make him a "demon with a soul" once more. They consent, and time is set back twenty four hours despite a heartbroken Buffy begging Angel to remain human before the Mohra demon is killed, with only Angel as a witness to the night he and Buffy shared in the erased timeline.

== Production details ==
In his essay on the music used in Angel, Matthew Mills points out how, when Angel asks the Oracles to turn back time, the slow tempo and use of the clarinet in the background music adds "emotive weight to the Oracles' sympathy" for his situation. As the Oracles explain that only Angel will remember the moments he shared with Buffy, Angel's theme ends on a minor key, underscoring the sacrifice being made.

"Angel is one of those heroes who flourish on frustration," Peter S. Beagle says, "who thrive on never achieving their hearts' desire." This episode, in which Angel relinquishes the chance to have a normal, happy life with Buffy in order to "fulfill his penance," perfectly typifies Angel's character and fate, says Beagle.

== Reception ==
Noel Murray of The A.V. Club liked the premise but not the whole execution, writing, "It's an undeniably sweet episode, but I have to say I found the set-up clunky and the complications a little forced, no matter how beautifully it all plays out."

In Entertainment Weekly's list of the 25 best Whedonverse episodes—including episodes from Angel, as well as Buffy the Vampire Slayer, Firefly and Dollhouse—"I Will Remember You" placed at #14. This episode was rated the series' best episode in a poll done by Angel Magazine in 2005.
