= Sanctuary (Angel) =

- Angel episode
- Episode no.: Season 1 Episode 19
- Directed by: Michael Lange
- Written by: Tim Minear; Joss Whedon
- Production code: 1ADH19
- Original air date: May 2, 2000

Guest appearances
- Sarah Michelle Gellar as Buffy Summers; Eliza Dushku as Faith; Elisabeth Röhm as Kate Lockley; Christian Kane as Lindsey McDonald; Thomas Burr as Lee Mercer; Stephanie Romanov as Lilah Morgan; Alastair Duncan as Collins; Jeff Ricketts as Weatherby; Kevin Owers as Smith; Adam Vernier as Detective Kendrick

Episode chronology
← Previous "Five by Five"	Next → "War Zone"
- Angel season 1

"Sanctuary" is the 19th episode of the first season of the American television series Angel. Co-written by Tim Minear and series creator Joss Whedon and directed by Michael Lange, it was originally broadcast on May 2, 2000, on the WB network.

In "Sanctuary", guest star Sarah Michelle Gellar returns as Buffy, who has come to Los Angeles seeking vengeance against Slayer Faith. Buffy is shocked to discover Angel is attempting to redeem Faith's violent nature, and Wesley is faced with a crisis of loyalties when the Watcher's Council assassins offer him reinstatement if he gives Faith over to them. Also, evil Wolfram & Hart lawyer Lindsey approaches Kate to help them take revenge on Faith and Angel. Nonetheless, Angel continues to help Faith even as Buffy, the Watcher's Council, and the LAPD try to take her down.

== Plot ==
Following her attempt to make him kill her, Angel takes Faith to his apartment. In a brief, violent vision, Faith charges at Angel with a knife and cuts up his face. When Angel comes up to get food to feed Faith, Wesley argues about giving Faith another chance, and Cordelia gets Angel to sign several checks to fund her vacation so she can be gone for as long as Faith is around.

Downstairs, Faith confesses to Angel that she is haunted by visions of her violent past in Sunnydale. Angel talks to Faith about redemption, saying she has to make amends for her crimes, no matter how hard it is. Faith tells Angel how worried she is about making up for everything she has done, and in process reveals that Buffy has a new boyfriend, which upsets Angel. Meanwhile, Wesley plays darts at a bar, and encounters Weatherby, a member of the Watchers' Council's Special Operations team on the hunt for Faith. The council members offer Wesley a chance to return to the Council if he is willing to turn in Faith. They give him a syringe that, if injected, will sedate Faith and let them take her back to England. Wesley agrees on the condition that Angel is left unharmed, to which the team reluctantly agrees.

At Wolfram & Hart, Lindsey MacDonald, Lilah Morgan, and Lee Mercer, upset that Faith has teamed up with Angel, hire a demon to have her killed. The demon sneaks into Angel's apartment and attacks. Faith kills it with a knife, and is frightened by the sight of the demon's blood on her hands. Without warning, Buffy arrives at Angel's place and is shocked to find Angel hugging Faith.

Buffy is determined to turn Faith over to the police, but Angel objects and the two come to blows. Buffy hits Angel and, when he hits her back, she is in utter shock. Wesley arrives with the news that the Council is looking for Faith. The two Slayers escape to the roof, where they argue about everything that has happened. Though Faith is genuinely sorry for what she has done, Buffy is unwilling to forgive her. One of the Council members attacks Buffy and Faith as another hovers above the roof in a helicopter. Inside the apartment, Wesley stabs Weatherby with the syringe while Angel runs upstairs and as the two Slayers seek cover against their attackers, Angel bursts through the roof skylight and gets inside the helicopter.

Detective Kate Lockley, guided by Lindsey's information, arrests Angel for harboring the fugitive Faith. When Angel and Kate arrive at the police station with Wesley and Buffy in tow, they are surprised to see Faith is voluntarily confessing to her crimes. Later, Buffy admits to Angel how hard it was for her to see Faith with him. Angel counters by saying it was not about Buffy, rather it was about saving Faith's soul. Buffy proceeds to explain that she had come because he was in danger, but Angel knows that she was merely using this as an excuse to get revenge on Faith, which she does not deny. Buffy lashes out by telling Angel she has someone else in her life, and, unlike her relationship with Angel, she can trust her new boyfriend. In response, a furious Angel launches a tirade against Buffy, reminding her that while she has moved on, he himself cannot and has no one to share his pain with. He then informs Buffy that they lead their own separate lives now and that she has no right to tell him how to do things. As Angel harshly orders Buffy to go back to Sunnydale, she reluctantly complies, complaining that he just gave Faith another victory. As soon as she is gone, Angel regrets his harsh words and decides to head to Sunnydale to make amends. Meanwhile, Faith manages to find peace in her jail cell.

== Production details ==
Production designer Stuart Blatt said that filming this episode was challenging due to scheduling problems with Sarah Michelle Gellar. Just a few days before shooting, they learned Gellar would not be available to work outside on the night the scene was supposed to be filmed. "We had to take our rooftop setting and split it into two and shoot everything on the rooftop looking out towards the city in one direction with the real helicopter on the rooftop. Then on the stage, recreate the exact rooftop looking the other direction, shoot everything there, and marry them seamlessly," he explained. "It was one of the more impressive things we ever pulled off."

Usually, Joss Whedon's name is listed first in episodes he has co-written and is credited for. In this episode, Tim Minear's name is listed first because he approached the editor and (jokingly) told him that his name comes first.

=== Writing ===
Writer Tim Minear said the script for this episode was difficult, because "it was Faith as we had never seen her before. It was sort of easy when it was evil Faith, which was a lot of fun. The problem was trying to make her turn realistic." He admitted to being nervous about writing Buffy's scenes because of the challenge of writing to her character and tone. He convinced Whedon to come in and write all of Buffy's scenes.

Joss Whedon has said that he explained the process of writing one of his scenes:

The last scene between Buffy and Angel in the crossover where she comes to Angel, that stumped us for a long time. And I finally realized when I was working on it that it's because they need to fight now. They can't be just like, 'Oh, we're swell pals and we get along.' They really are at very different places in their lives and it's very difficult for them to see each other. So it really helped define how the shows are different and it ends up with Angel laying into Buffy a little bit and saying, 'I've got my own show now, and it's different from your show, so get off my show!' That's basically what he's saying. And the moment I wrote that scene, I got very excited and I said, 'I get it now. I understand what Angel is and it's not Buffy,' and I felt like the training wheels came off.
