= Kate Lockley =

- Angel character
- Elisabeth Röhm as Kate Lockley
- First appearance: "Lonely Heart" (1999)
- Last appearance: Angel: After the Fall
- Created by: Joss Whedon, David Greenwalt, David Fury
- Portrayed by: Elisabeth Röhm

In-universe information
- Affiliation: Los Angeles Police Department; Angel Investigations
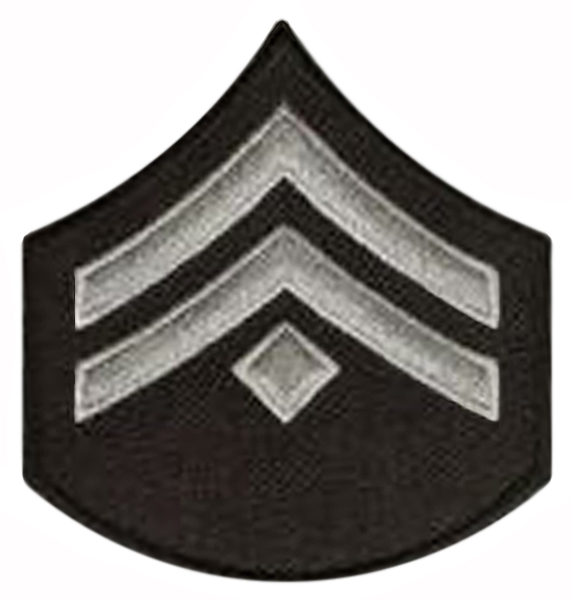
- Classification: Los Angeles Police Detective I Vampire hunter

Kate Lockley is a fictional character created by Joss Whedon for Angel. She is portrayed by Elisabeth Röhm. Lockley first appears in the episode "Lonely Heart" as a young, skeptical detective for the Los Angeles Police Department. Gradually, she becomes more hardened as she learns of the supernatural world.

== Characterization and storylines ==
Kate Lockley is a young police detective working for the LAPD, initially unaware of the supernatural. She first appears in "Lonely Heart", investigating a case involving the brutal murders of several patrons of D'Oblique, a popular singles bar. After encountering Angel as he leaves the site of another murder, she instantly suspects him to be the killer, unaware that Angel had actually been attempting to stop the real killer. Angel escapes, and Kate becomes obsessed with finding him to the point that she searches the Angel Investigations offices without a warrant. After she is attacked by the real killer and saved by Angel, she helps him to bring the killer down. Kate subsequently clears Angel of all charges, and Angel offers his services to her whenever she needs them.

Kate's subsequent encounters with Angel lead her to trust him as a helpful stranger, and she in turn, assists him, using her position on the police force to provide him with information.

Kate was raised by her widowed father, Trevor, who is also a police officer and taught her to put her emotions aside and to take care of herself at all costs. Through her father, she develops a complete devotion to her occupation, later on saying that being a cop is all she's ever known and that she wouldn't know what else to do. When she discovers that Angel is really a vampire and subsequently discovers his past as Angelus before his soul is restored, her black and white view of the world is shaken, and she delves into the darker side of Los Angeles. On one such investigation, Kate finds her father's lifeless body—completely drained of blood by vampires.

After her father's death, Kate's relationship with Angel becomes strained and eventually adversarial. She becomes obsessed with ridding the city of vampires and other demons. Kate is the first to investigate any calls matching the "otherworldly" profile, even if it is out of her jurisdiction. She has an intense dislike for Wolfram & Hart and the clients the law firm represents.

When a resurrected Darla frames Angel for murder and goes on a killing spree with Drusilla, Kate shows up as his arresting officer and lets him go as she believes he is the only one who can stop them. Although Angel catches them, he allows them to murder 13 lawyers, which causes Kate to distrust him again after she figures out that he not only let them murder but facilitated them by locking the doors.

Her obsession with supernatural cases becomes her own undoing: after Angel attacks a police captain who had brought back deceased police officers as zombies in an attempt to cut down on crime, along with her increasingly erratic and obsessive behavior, she is fired from the LAPD. Kate calls Angel and blames him for ruining her life, then attempts suicide by taking prescription pills with hard liquor. Angel hears her call and later goes to Kate's apartment. When she does not respond to his energetic knocks, he breaks down her door, finds her lifeless body on the floor, picks her up and holds her under a cold shower to resuscitate her. After her life is saved, she thanks him and then tells him to leave. That evening, Kate and Angel talk and she forgives him, believing there is a higher power at work and they are not alone in the never-ending battle against the forces of darkness. When Angel asks her why, she replies that she never invited him into her apartment, yet he was able to break in and save her.

She never appears on the series again, due to Elisabeth Röhm joining the cast of Law & Order. However, she is mentioned again in "Dead End" soon after her last appearance-Angel mentions to his friends that they no longer have a friend in the LAPD.

Kate reappears in the seventh issue of Angel: After the Fall, saving Connor from a group of demons, unaware that Connor is Angel's son. She establishes an antiquities business after her departure from the LAPD, and uses her business connections to learn more about the supernatural and the occult. She stocks her hideout with an arsenal of ancient to modern weapons. She is seen leaving to blow up a demon army. This actual event takes place the same night as "Not Fade Away". Some time later, after LA was restored to normal, she once again encounters Angel and reopens Angel Investigations. However, there are several difficulties due to Angel's new fame status (since many clients are actually fans and admirers rather than people who need help), plus an upheaval in demonic activity. The current Angel Investigations consists of Angel, Kate, Connor and Gwen.

In the Angel & Faith series, it is briefly mentioned by Gunn that Kate is back with the LAPD leading their new supernatural investigations unit, as the existence of the mystical world has since become public knowledge following the events of "Chosen" and "Not Fade Away".

== Writing and acting ==
- Kate was originally conceived as a much darker character. In the unproduced episode "Corrupt," she was a detective deep undercover as a prostitute and addicted to drugs.
- Elisabeth Röhm said "I thought Kate was this incredibly powerful young woman who is fantastic at what she does, but at the same time, just a girl. There's a great line in Notting Hill when Julia Roberts says, 'I'm just a girl wanting a boy to love me.' I think that's a part of Kate and a part of everyone who is really great at what they do. They're actually just the girl or boy who's real and has the same problems as everybody else. She's this tough, smart cookie, but she just wants to be loved and she doesn't know how to do it."
- Röhm on the relationship between Kate and Angel: "I think that Kate and Angel are kind of meant for each other but in a way, you can see them become best friends."
- Röhm on her character's departure from Angel: "Well, I was the first season of the show, I was part of the original cast and loved doing it, but by the second season, I had my own show on TNT called Bull so I had to go back & forth between my show & recurring on Angel, and then after that I was offered Law & Order and Joss & I decided it would be impossible for me to go from New York (where I was a regular on Law & Order) to Los Angeles for Angel and we had a great opportunity for it to end dramatically, and it was very satisfying for both of us."

== Appearances ==
=== Canonical appearances ===
Kate appeared in 15 episodes of Angel and one unaired episode. She is only mentioned briefly by other characters after her departure in the second season.

- Season 1 (1999- 2000) - "Corrupt" (unaired), "Lonely Heart", "I Fall To Pieces", "Rm w/a Vu", "Sense & Sensitivity", "Somnambulist", "I've Got You Under My Skin", "The Prodigal", "Sanctuary", "To Shanshu in L.A.".
- Season 2 (2000-2001) - "Dear Boy", "The Shroud of Rahmon", "Reunion", "The Thin Dead Line", "Reprise", "Epiphany".

Kate appears in the canonical comic book continuation of the series in Angel: After the Fall #7.

=== Non-canonical appearances ===
Kate appears in Angel expanded universe, including the Angel comic Hunting Ground.
