= Somnambulist (Angel) =

- Angel episode
- Episode no.: Season 1 Episode 11
- Directed by: Winrich Kolbe
- Written by: Tim Minear
- Production code: 1ADH11
- Original air date: January 18, 2000

Guest appearances
- Elisabeth Röhm as Kate Lockley; Jeremy Renner as Penn; Nick McCallum as Skateboard Kid; Kimberleigh Aarn as Precinct Clerk; Paul Webster as Uniform #1; Brien DiRito as Task Force Member #1

Episode chronology
← Previous "Parting Gifts"	Next → "Expecting"
- Angel season 1

"Somnambulist" is the 11th episode of the first season of the American television series Angel.

== Plot ==
The episode opens on a girl fleeing down a street from a shadowy figure. She stumbles, allowing the pursuer to catch up. The man holds her and runs a finger with a metal claw over it down her cheek, carving a cross into it. Once finished, he bites her and drains her of blood. The camera's view moves over the figure's head and it looks very much like Angel, who is jerked from sleep in a cold sweat. Meanwhile, detective Kate examines the body and comments that it must be the same man.

The next morning, Cordelia is practicing talking to clients when Wesley enters with their mail and inquires if Cordelia or Angel have noticed anything sinister going on, but Cordelia has nothing for him and tells him he has brought in the wrong mail. Wesley notices something that seems familiar and frightening on the front page of the newspaper he has brought. Angel comes in, cranky about her looking up a license plate. Cordelia suggests Angel try asking Kate for the favor. Angel, distracted, tries to leave by the front door and almost bursts into flame. After he leaves, Angel goes to the police station to talk to Kate and notices the crime scene photos, which call up haunting images of his dreams. After that, Wesley confronts Cordelia about the fact that the recent murders match Angel's MO. Cordelia is skeptical until Angel himself admits it might be him, dreaming. They chain him to his bed to test the theory. That night, instead of dreaming about a current murder, he dreams about his past when he had just turned a vampire named Penn. He realizes the killer is Penn and resolves to tell Kate, despite Wesley's objections.

Angel goes to Kate and talks to her in private. He asks Kate if she trusts him, and gives her a sketch of the vampire's face and a clue about who and where he will strike next. On his way out, he steals a police radio so he and Wesley can intercept Penn before the police confront him. Kate's task force find Penn in the act and force him into an abandoned warehouse. Kate goes in alone to capture him, while Angel and Wesley drive to the building and Angel sneaks in. Kate finds and shoots Penn, but he gets up and attacks her until Angel interrupts. Penn expects Angel to be on his side until Angel attacks him. Penn escapes and Kate is confused. Afterward, Angel confronts her and tells her to leave Penn to him because she does not know what she is dealing with.

Penn confronts Cordelia in their offices. Cordelia surmises his identity and has him cornered with Angel until Wesley walks in and Penn uses him as a hostage. After Penn escapes, Angel searches for him and ends up at Kate's apartment, where she reveals she now knows about vampires and particularly his past. She mentions Penn's previous visits to Los Angeles, which Angel takes as a clue. Angel, Cordelia, and Wesley use his previous visits to find Penn's lair in an oft-remodeled hotel/apartment building. Angel and Wesley go there and find photos of school buses, along with schedules for such buses. It appears Penn's next target will be a bus of schoolchildren. Kate is prepping her task force for apprehending Penn when he reveals that he is in the room and attacks them all, then captures Kate. Penn drags Kate to the sewer and Angel intervenes, revealing that he had known that the schoolchildren were a decoy. They fight until Penn has Angel in a lock with Kate holding an oversized piece of wood. She jabs it through both of them, intentionally missing Angel's heart but killing Penn.

Afterward on a rooftop, Cordelia tells Angel she had a vision, but he is worried about his nature, because he enjoyed the dreams of hunting and killing. She tells him his actions count, not his dark internal issues, though she promises to stake him if he becomes a problem.

== Production details ==
After writing the first draft, Tim Minear had to rewrite parts of the script to accommodate Wesley's arrival and Doyle's departure; the final scene on the rooftop was originally between Angel and Doyle. The script was originally called "The Killer I Created", until a detailed summary appeared online, prompting Minear to alter the title. "I went on to the Buffy message board... changed the title and said it was about dreams and about horrible things that you do in your sleep, which completely fooled the fans," says Minear.

Minear says Kate finally discovering Angel is a vampire is "sort of the point of the episode." Another pivotal scene, which was conceived early in the breaking stage, is when Kate goes through Angel to stake Penn. Minear calls this "the perfect moment. Because it's Angel opening himself up and actually sort of taking responsibility in a visceral movie kind of way for this horrible thing that he's done."

Unusually more than fifty actors were auditioned before Jeremy Renner was cast as Penn; the casting director Amy Britt later commented that it was difficult to cast an antagonist to Angel, but Renner was "formidable" despite being physically less imposing than Boreanaz.
