= Couplet (Angel) =

- Angel episode
- Episode no.: Season 3 Episode 14
- Directed by: Tim Minear
- Written by: Tim Minear; Jeffrey Bell
- Production code: 3ADH14
- Original air date: February 18, 2002

Guest appearances
- Andy Hallett as Lorne; Mark Lutz as The Groosalugg; Bernard K. Addison as Monster; Steven Hack as Lionel; Fanshen Cox as Anita; Marisa Matarazzo as Susan; Scott Donovan as Jerry; Bob Rumnock as Businessman; Vanie Poyey as Pillow Fight Woman; Michael Otis as Pillow Fight Man

Episode chronology
← Previous "Waiting in the Wings"	Next → "Loyalty"
- Angel season 3

"Couplet" is the 14th episode of the third season of the American television series Angel.

== Plot synopsis ==
At her apartment, Cordelia changes into something comfortable while Groo explains how he was dethroned in Pylea. They kiss, but after Cordelia sees a demon in Groo's place as a vision painlessly hits her, she's no longer in the mood.

The next morning, Angel carries Connor around and talks with Wesley about investigating prophecies about Connor. Cordelia arrives with Groo in tow. She informs them about the demon from her vision and that it will be surfacing later that day. When the topic returns to Cordelia's lack of a sex life, she tells her friends about her worry of losing her visions to Groo if they did actually have sex. Meanwhile, Gunn and Fred have breakfast together and talk. As they lean in for a kiss, their beepers go off with calls from Wesley.

While a picture of the demon, a Senih'd, is passed around, Wesley explains the plan. As Groo raises the subject of Cordelia's obvious sadness, Angel explains Cordelia's fear of losing something if she gets too close to Groo. Following a trail of blood, the two demon hunters find the demon and battle with it. The Senih'd breaks through a wall into the daylight, and only Groo can follow to destroy it. Cordelia and the others arrive just in time to congratulate him.

While Groo recounts his battle to the others, Angel talks with a Ms. Frakes about investigating a witch who is supposedly seducing her fiancé. Wesley assigns the job to Gunn, but Fred tags along too, much to Wesley's dismay. Wesley and Angel go to a bookstore for a supposedly rare text of commentaries on the scrolls about Connor. Back at the office, Groo agrees to let Cordelia give him a complete makeover, thinking that it will make her love him more. She explains that she already has strong feelings for him, and he then understands Cordelia is concerned about losing her visions.

Jerry, the fiancé, is tailed by Gunn and Fred who videotape the man as he waits beside a large tree. The two start kissing and distractedly miss the moment when Jerry disappears. Cordelia asks Angel for the favor of escorting Groo to a demon brothel where a magic potion is held which will allow her to have sex with Groo without losing her visions.

Gunn and Fred refer to the videotape for evidence of Jerry's disappearance and watch him get sucked into the ground by the tree's roots a few seconds before they're sucked down as well. At the brothel, Angel and Groo follow Anita past tempting sights into a room where cash is exchanged for the potion. When Anita questions Angel's presence there, he gets a phone call from Gunn and Fred who are bound by tree roots underground. They explain that it is a living flesh tree with an internet connection which lures victims in order to suck the life out of them. Naturally, they avoid contacting Wesley and instead request the Groosalugg.

Before reaching the underground spot where Gunn and Fred are held, Groo has Angel keep the potion safe and then rushes into battle, despite Angel's suggestions. The tree quickly sticks one of its fleshy roots deep into Groo's chest. The tree gets stronger as it feeds on Groo, so Angel questions the tree as he pounds Groo into unconsciousness. The tree impales Angel instead, and suddenly the tree begins to die as it feeds off of Angel's dead heart. The others break free, and Gunn finishes the tree demon off.

Later that night, Wesley talks with Ms. Frakes on the phone, confirming that Jerry survived. Fred goes to get cleaned up while Gunn stays to talk with Wesley. Wesley expresses his concern for Fred and her feelings and although it takes a few moments, Gunn realizes the real reason for Wesley's worry. Cordelia tends to Groo's wounds, and Groo confesses his reckless behavior earlier that evening, but Cordy is only turned on more by his honesty.

Eager for sex, Cordelia is about to rush out, when Angel stops her. He insists that she accept some money he has saved up so that she can take a sunny vacation with Groo. Lorne lays Connor down for bed and as soon as Angel arrives, leaves him to be alone with his son. Angel carries Connor downstairs and finds Wesley working in the office. As the two leave, Wesley looks down on his notepad where he has translated, "The Father will kill The Son."
