= Air ram =

Pneumatic device for stunts

The air ram is a pneumatic device that catapults a stunt performer through the air. To simulate the effects of an explosion, the performer steps on a large "pedal" and using compressed air the "pedal" is released sending the performer hurtling through the air. The distance and height the performer attains is dependent upon the air pressure set.

There are many different design types, but all air rams have a few design elements in common: They use compressed air and a surface area that the performer steps on—that is raised using the compressed air which then catapults the person forward.

At the 1995 (65th) Academy Awards Scientific and Technical Awards presentation, stunt performer Joe Finnegan (a.k.a. Joe Yrigoyen) was the recipient of a Technical Achievement Award for "his pioneering work in developing the Air Ram for motion picture stunt effects."
