= Allen Francis Doyle =

Character in the television series Angel

- Angel character
- Glenn Quinn as Francis Allen Doyle
- First appearance: "City Of" (1999)
- Last appearance: "Hero" (1999)
- Created by: Joss Whedon
- Portrayed by: Glenn Quinn

In-universe information
- Affiliation: The Powers That Be; Angel Investigations
- Classification: Half-Brachen demon Half-human
- Notable powers: Precognitive visions Superhuman strength, dexterity, stamina and speed

Allen Francis Doyle is a fictional character created by Joss Whedon for the television series Angel. The character was portrayed by Glenn Quinn. Doyle is a seer who receives prophetic visions from The Powers That Be, usually of people in peril. Half-human, half-demon, his demon heritage allows him to manage them without suffering any permanent damage. His half-Brachen demon physiology grants him the ability to shift from normal human to demonic appearance, in which he has heightened sense of smell and superior strength, speed, stamina, and dexterity, the last of which allows him to twist his head around in such a manner as to fake a broken neck. However, Doyle rarely used his Brachen powers, preferring to remain human, thus limiting his usefulness in a fight.

== Character history ==
Doyle is an Irishman who was born to a human mother and a Brachen demon father. Doyle never knew his father or anyone on that side of his family, and his own demonic genes didn't physically manifest themselves until he was 21 years old. At that time, Doyle was a third grade teacher and a soup kitchen volunteer married to a woman named Harriet. He didn't take the news of his demonic heritage very well. In spite of Harriet's acceptance of his other side, his marriage ultimately disintegrated. Doyle hid behind the flimsy veneer of a ne'er-do-well hustler and con artist, seemingly more interested in where his next drink was coming from than helping others.

Later, he was approached by a fellow Brachen demon, Lucas, who told Doyle that the Scourge, a militant group of pure blood demons, was after all half-breeds and begged for Doyle's help. Doyle turned Lucas away, believing this wasn't his problem. Soon after he received a vision, which he described as "splittin' migraines that come with pictures". The vision showed him a group of massacred Brachen demons. Doyle searched the city to find out if what he had seen was real – it was. These visions, which come from The Powers That Be, are what led Doyle to Angel. As Doyle says, "We all got something to atone for," and therefore the two join forces to fight evil in Los Angeles. Once Cordelia Chase joins the team, Angel Investigations is officially formed.

Doyle soon falls in love with Cordelia, but is afraid she will reject him upon finding out about his demonic heritage, especially when she makes it clear on multiple occasions that she considers many demons evil. He also forms a close, brotherly bond with Angel as the result of their shared Irish heritage and similar demonic backgrounds, although his combat skills were limited due to his dislike of his demon half, which meant that he rarely transformed despite the greater strength he possessed in that form. Despite Doyle's reluctance to discuss his past, Angel and Cordelia learn about him when Harriet returns to his life, wanting a divorce so she can marry an Ano-Movic demon named Richard Howard Straley, though she ultimately calls off the engagement after learning that obtaining the blessing of the Straley clan would require Richard to kill Doyle by eating his brain.

Doyle's past again comes back to haunt him when the Scourge returns, threatening the Listers, another tribe of human/demon hybrids. During the battle, Doyle sacrifices his own life to save his friends, the Listers, and other nearby humans from the Beacon, a device which could destroy any being "tainted" with human blood within a quarter mile radius. While trying to successfully deactivate the Beacon, the radiation from the weapon killed Doyle by literally vaporizing his entire body into dust and ash. In doing so, Doyle fulfills the Listers' prophecy of the "Promised One," the bringer purported to save them from the Scourge in the last days of the 20th century. Before Doyle dies, he shares a passionate kiss with Cordelia (who had only recently learned of – and accepted – Doyle's demonic heritage). Unbeknownst to her, he was also passing his visions on to her.

After Doyle's death, he briefly appears in the third-season episode "Birthday" and the fifth-season episode "You're Welcome," the former in a flashback and the latter courtesy of the Angel Investigations commercial he and Cordelia had made before he died, which Cordelia watches as she reflects on the team's history. In "Birthday", it is revealed that, in the alternate timeline that Cordelia has been sent to, Doyle passed his visions on to Angel before his death, and their power, along with the absence of Cordelia's humanizing influence, drove him insane.

In the fifth season of Angel, Lindsey McDonald briefly assumes Doyle's identity in an ultimately failed attempt to convince Angel and the others that Spike, not Angel, is the subject of the Shanshu Prophecy. Angel and Cordelia both display great anger at this abuse of Doyle's name and legacy.

== Writing and acting ==
Originally, it was Whistler, an ambiguous demon played by Max Perlich and first seen in the Buffy episode "Becoming, Part One," who was to be a supporting character in the spin-off series starring Angel, but instead, the character of Doyle was created with similar character traits. Quinn was asked if he knew Doyle was Irish before he auditioned, he responded "I went and I read it in American and Joss Whedon said 'Hey, let's do it in Irish and see where it takes us.'.. The Irish thing just really clicked."

Whedon considered killing off Doyle early on from the opening episodes: "That was always a plan, and clearly that character didn't mesh. He was a very popular character, but the mesh was very difficult in ways that made it hard to write. Glenn had a kind of intensity that was kind of like David [Boreanaz's], and David already has that. It could have gone a different way, but that was the plan we had and we decided to execute it. Glenn Quinn knew that it was an issue and he learned pretty early on. I said this is what we're going to do...' and I promised him a hero's exit." At the TCA Writers Guild of America West party in 2000, supervising producer David Fury stated, "Joss has bandied about, 'I love the idea of putting a character in the main credits as one of the stars of the show and then kill him right off the bat.' But in the case of Doyle, he didn't want to kill off Doyle. It just became a situation. The work situation became difficult... It's hard enough to make a television show without the headaches."

In an interview in Dreamwatch #118, David Fury discussed plans for Doyle to return to the show, perhaps in the role of a "big bad." However, Quinn died in December 2002 before anything could come of the talks.

== Appearances ==
=== Canonical appearances ===
In Angel, Doyle was a series regular for part of the show's first season (1999). He appeared in nine episodes overall. After the events of "Parting Gifts", he disappeared from the opening credits.

Archived footage of the character appears in the episodes, "Birthday" and "You're Welcome".

=== Non-canonical appearances ===
Comics

In July 2006, IDW Comics released Doyle: Spotlight. It features Doyle shortly before his first encounter with Angel.

Doyle is also a main character in the following comics (ordered by chronology):

- Surrogates, Earthly Possessions, Angel #4, Hunting Ground

Novels

Doyle is a main character in the following novels (ordered by chronology):

- Not Forgotten, Close to the Ground, Soul Trade, Redemption, Shakedown, Hollywood Noir, Avatar, Bruja, and The Summoned

The Buffy/Angel crossover book, Monster Island, set in the third season of Angel also includes a story linked to Doyle and his father, who is a pure-blood supremacist who wanted to purge Doyle of his human half. Having learned of his son's death, Doyle's father – a full Brachen demon called Axtius, possessing sufficient strength to even go head-to-head with Angel in a fight – sends several demons to attack Harry, sending her to the hospital, and subsequently attempts to kill Angel, blaming him for his son's 'foolish attempt to save a pack of pitiful half-breeds'. In their final confrontation, Angel defeats Axtius when unarmed despite Axtius wielding a powerful mystical weapon, taunting the Brachen by saying that he would have been ashamed of Doyle's very human act of sacrifice and redemption, Axtius subsequently being incinerated by his former second-in-command for his failure.
