= Tim Minear =

American screenwriter and director

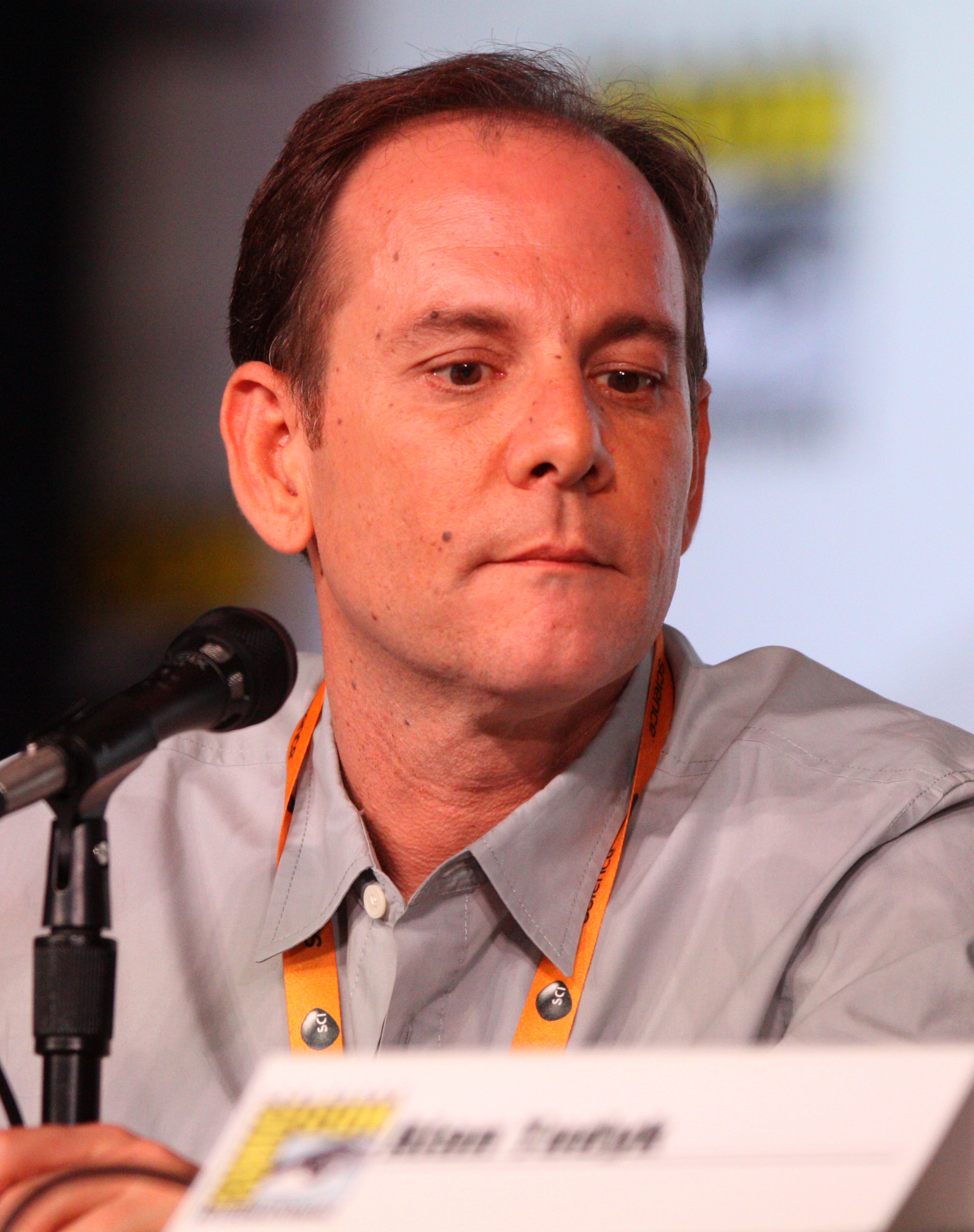
- Tim Minear in 2012
- Born: October 29, 1963 (age 62); New York City, New York, U.S.
- Occupations: Screenwriter, television director/producer
- Known for: American Horror Story, Firefly, Angel, Lois & Clark: The New Adventures of Superman, 9-1-1

Timothy P. Minear (/maɪˈniːr/; born October 29, 1963) is an American screenwriter and director. He has been nominated for four Emmy Awards (2013, 2014, 2015, 2017) for his role as an executive producer on American Horror Story and Feud.

== Life and career ==
Minear was born in New York City, grew up in Whittier, California, and studied film at California State University, Long Beach.

Minear was an assistant director on the film Platoon, and wrote episodes for several television series including The X-Files, Zorro, and Lois and Clark. He later wrote, executive-produced, and directed episodes of Strange World, Angel, Firefly, Wonderfalls, and The Inside (which he also created, with Howard Gordon).

Minear had another series, Drive, airing on Fox in April 2007; however' it was cancelled by the network after only four episodes. Drive was set to return with two additional episodes on July 4, 2007, but these were rescheduled to July 13 and then cancelled. This continued his tradition of short-lived work on Fox.

Tim Minear has worked on several shows that have lasted for only one season, including Strange World, Firefly, Wonderfalls, The Inside, Drive, Terriers, and The Chicago Code. After nearly a decade of writing, and producing TV shows which lasted for a single season, the streak came to an end when he was hired to write and produce for Ryan Murphy's American Horror Story. Because of all of the shows he has written and produced that lasted for only one season, he took the Twitter handle "@CancelledAgain" to mark his status as a writer/producer who was consistently in search of more work.

Minear often works with Joss Whedon, and his work is typically characterized by a sharp, black humour and an ability to portray characters who are sympathetic and understandable, but morally ambiguous. Minear wrote the key episodes of Angel Season Two.

In 2004, Minear stated that he was hired to write a screenplay of The Moon Is a Harsh Mistress.

In 2007, he received a pilot commitment from ABC for Miracle Man, a drama series for which the company engaged in a bidding war with Fox Broadcasting Company. The series was being produced by 20th Century Fox Television, with which Minear had signed in an overall deal. Minear, since 2011, when American Horror Story (AHS) debuted, has been an executive producer for multiple successful shows for 20th Century Fox Television. These successful shows include AHS, as well as two shows Minear co-created, and showruns, 9-1-1, and its spin-off 9-1-1: Lone Star. All of these shows were co-created with Ryan Murphy and Brad Falchuk. In 2018, his ReamWorks company signed a new Fox deal. Minear signed this deal to make sure the shows he had co-created at Fox with Ryan Murphy and Brad Falchuk would remain under their creative control, as Murphy had just recently left Fox to produce shows for Netflix.

== Credits ==
- Lois and Clark: The New Adventures of Superman
  - 4x05 "Brutal Youth" (writer)
  - 4x11 "'Twas the Night Before Mxymas" (writer)
  - 4x14 "Meet John Doe" (writer)
  - 4x20 "I've Got You Under My Skin" (writer)
- The X-Files
  - 5x08 "Kitsunegari" (co-writer)
  - 5x16 "Mind's Eye" (writer)
- Strange World
  - 1x02 "Lullaby" (writer)
  - 1x04 "Spirit Falls" (co-writer)
- Angel
  - 1x06 "Sense & Sensitivity" (writer)
  - 1x09 "Hero" (co-writer)
  - 1x11 "Somnambulist" (writer)
  - 1x15 "The Prodigal" (writer)
  - 1x19 "Sanctuary" (co-writer)
  - 2x02 "Are You Now or Have You Ever Been" (writer)
  - 2x07 "Darla" (writer/director)
  - 2x09 "The Trial" (co-writer)
  - 2x10 "Reunion" (co-writer)
  - 2x15 "Reprise" (writer)
  - 2x16 "Epiphany" (writer)
  - 2x21 "Through The Looking Glass" (writer/director)
  - 3x03 "That Old Gang of Mine" (writer)
  - 3x06 "Billy" (co-writer)
  - 3x09 "Lullaby" (writer/director)
  - 3x14 "Couplet" (co-writer/director)
  - 3x20 "A New World" (director)
  - 3x21 "Benediction" (writer/director)
  - 4x22 "Home" (writer/director)
- Firefly
  - 1x02 "The Train Job" (co-writer)
  - 1x03 "Bushwhacked" (writer/director)
  - 1x08 "Out of Gas" (writer)
  - 1x12 "The Message" (co-writer/director)
- Wonderfalls
  - 1x02 "Karma Chameleon" (writer)
  - 1x07 "Barrel Bear" (unaired) (co-writer)
- The Inside
  - 1x01 "New Girl In Town" (teleplay & story/director)
  - 1x06 "Thief of Hearts" (co-writer)
  - 1x10 "Little Girl Lost" (unaired in US, UK Airdate 03/17/2006) (co-writer)
  - 1x13 "Skin and Bone" (unaired) (story)
- Drive
  - 1x00 "Unaired Pilot" (co-writer)
  - 1x01 "The Starting Line" (co-writer)
  - 1x02 "Partners" (co-writer)
- Dollhouse
  - 1x05 "True Believer" (writer)
  - 1x12 "Omega" (writer/director)
  - 2x03 "Belle Chose" (writer)
  - 2x11 "Getting Closer" (writer/director)
- Terriers
  - 1x11 "Sins of the Past" (writer)
- The Chicago Code
  - 1x04 "Cabrini-Green" (co-writer)
- American Horror Story
  - 1x05 "Halloween (Part 2)" (writer)
  - 1x11 "Birth" (writer)
  - 2x01 "Welcome to Briarcliff" (writer)
  - 2x07 "Dark Cousin" (writer)
  - 2x13 "Madness Ends" (writer)
  - 3x02 "Boy Parts" (writer)
  - 3x09 "Head" (writer)
  - 4x02 "Massacres and Matinees" (writer)
  - 5x02 "Chutes and Ladders" (writer)
  - 6x02 "Chapter 2" (writer)
  - 6x09 "Chapter 9" (writer)
  - 7x02 "Don't Be Afraid of the Dark" (writer)
  - 7x11 "Great Again" (writer)
  - 8x04 "Could It Be... Satan?" (writer)
  - 9x02 "Mr. Jingles" (writer)
- Feud: Bette and Joan
  - 1x02 "The Other Woman" (co-writer)
  - 1x03 "Mommie Dearest" (writer)
  - 1x04 "More, or Less" (co-writer)
  - 1x06 "Hagsploitation" (co-writer, director)
- 9-1-1
  - 1x01 "Pilot" (co-writer)
  - 1x02 "Let Go" (co-writer)
  - 1x10 "A Whole New You" (co-writer)
  - 2x01 "Under Pressure" (co-writer)
  - 2x03 "Help Is Not Coming" (co-writer)
  - 2x11 "New Beginnings" (co-writer)
  - 2x18 "This Life We Choose" (writer)
  - 5x01 "Panic" (co-writer)
  - 7x01 "Abandon Ship" (writer)
  - 7x06 "There Goes The Groom" (co-writer)
  - 7x08 "Step Nine" (co-writer)
  - 8x02 "When the Boeing Gets Tough..." (co-writer)
  - 8x03 "Final Approach" (co-writer)
  - 8x09 "Sob Stories" (co-writer)
  - 8x16 "The Last Alarm" (co-writer)
  - 9x03 "The Sky Is Falling" (co-writer)
  - 9x04 "Reentry" (co-writer)
  - 9x13 "Mother's Boy" (writer)
- 9-1-1: Lone Star
  - 1x01 "Pilot" (writer)
  - 3x01 "The Big Chill" (writer)
  - 3x03 "Stock & Thaw" (writer)

== See also ==
- Mutant Enemy Productions
