= Angel (Buffy the Vampire Slayer) =

Character in Buffy the Vampire Slayer and Angel

- Buffy the Vampire Slayer / Angel character
- David Boreanaz as Angel in 1999.
- First appearance: "Welcome to the Hellmouth" (1997)
- Last appearance: Finale (2018)
- Created by: Joss Whedon
- Portrayed by: David Boreanaz
- Voiced by: David Boreanaz
- Television Studio: 20th Television
- Television Network: The WB

In-universe information
- Affiliation: The Whirlwind; Demon Research Initiative; Scooby Gang; Angel Investigations; Scourge; Body Jasmine; Wolfram & Hart; Circle of the Black Thorn; Twilight's Army
- Nationality: Irish
- Classification: Vampire
- Notable powers: Supernatural strength, speed, stamina, agility, and reflexes Acute sensory perception, rapid healing, and immortality

Angel is a fictional character created by Joss Whedon and David Greenwalt for the American television programs Buffy the Vampire Slayer and its spin-off series Angel. The character is portrayed by actor David Boreanaz. As introduced in Buffy in 1997, Angel is a love interest for heroine Buffy Summers (Sarah Michelle Gellar), a young woman whose destiny as "the Slayer" is to fight the forces of evil, such as vampires and demons. However, their relationship is complicated by the fact that Angel is himself a vampire cursed with remorse and a human soul, which motivates him to assist Buffy in her duties as Slayer. The character's popularity led to the production of the spin-off Angel, which follows the character's struggle towards redemption after moving to Los Angeles. In addition to the two television series, the character appears in the comic book continuations of both series, as well as much other expanded universe literature.

In the character's backstory, he was born as Liam in 18th-century Ireland and, after being sired, assumed the name Angelus, achieving infamy as the most sadistic vampire in European history. After angering a Romani clan, he was cursed with his human soul, leading to great personal torment and the decision to resist the evil impulses that come with being a vampire. He later assumes the shortened name Angel, and over the course of Buffy and Angel, he matures into an altruistic champion of mankind, and learns he is a central figure of several prophecies concerning an approaching apocalypse. In later editions of the comic series, Angel adopted the identity of the masked Twilight and gathered a cabal of humans and demons who had become wary of the rise of multiple Slayers.

Angel ended its five-year run in 2004. However, the canonical comic books Angel: After the Fall (2007–2009), Buffy the Vampire Slayer Season Eight (2007–2011) and Angel & Faith (2011–2013) depict the character's continued story, in which he is caught up in events of cosmic proportion and must deal with the fallout from enormous mistakes he has made.

Season 2 of Buffy and season 4 of Angel feature storylines in which, deprived of his soul, he resumes his Angelus persona and torments and kills some of his allies. He has attracted significant interest due to his dichotomous personality in the presence or absence of his soul, and the ways in which his relationship with Buffy conforms to and subverts the tropes of romantic drama and horror fiction.

== Appearances ==
=== Buffy the Vampire Slayer ===
Angel's first appearance is in "Welcome to the Hellmouth", the first episode of Buffy the Vampire Slayer in 1997. In it, he meets the protagonist Buffy Summers (Sarah Michelle Gellar), a young girl destined to fight evil in the small town of Sunnydale, California. For the first half of the season, Angel is an enigmatic love interest for Buffy, showing up only to offer her cryptic messages about upcoming threats. It is not until the episode "Angel" that the character is revealed to be a benevolent vampire from Galway, Ireland, who emigrated to the United States to escape his past as the sadistic Angelus after his soul was restored by a vengeful Romani clan. Although uneasy about trusting a vampire, Buffy and the Scooby Gang eventually come to view Angel as an ally. In the second season (1997–1998), Buffy and Angel's romantic relationship develops and the pair make love in the episode "Surprise". For experiencing a moment of pure happiness, however, the Romani curse on Angel is revoked, unleashing his soulless alter-ego, who reunites with his old friends, vampires Spike (James Marsters) and Drusilla (Juliet Landau), and begins terrorizing Buffy and her friends. Upon discovering Romani descendant Jenny Calendar (Robia LaMorte), who is working to translate the text of a spell to restore Angel's soul, Angelus murders her by breaking her neck, and places her body in the bed of her boyfriend, Giles (Anthony Head), for him to discover. Angelus then attempts to destroy the world by awakening the demon Acathla. In the season finale, neophyte witch Willow (Alyson Hannigan) manages to restore Angel's soul at the last moment, but Buffy is forced to kill him to save the world from Acathla, and Angel is sent to hell. In season 3 (1998–1999), episode three, "Faith, Hope & Trick", Angel is inexplicably returned from hell by an unknown party and is soon found by Buffy. The Scooby Gang are outraged when they discover that Buffy has been secretly caring for him since his resurrection, but grudgingly accept him after he saves Willow's life in episode seven, "Revelations". In the episode "Amends", the primordial First Evil attempts to manipulate Angel to murder Buffy, but Angel chooses suicide instead by waiting for the sun to rise on Christmas morning. California's heatwave is suddenly interrupted by a freak snowstorm hiding the sun, sparing Angel's life, which he takes as a sign from God that he was brought back for a reason. Buffy and Angel initially attempt to be friends but eventually resume their romance. However, Angel becomes more and more aware of their limitations as a couple and breaks up with her in the hopes that she will be happier without him, leaving Sunnydale altogether after attending Buffy's prom and helping her in the battle against Mayor Wilkins (Harry Groener).

=== Angel ===
After his departure from Buffy, Angel appeared in his own spin-off series, titled Angel. Moving to Los Angeles, he starts a supernatural detective agency called Angel Investigations. He dedicates himself to "helping the helpless," and becomes a Champion of The Powers That Be, who send him psychic visions through his employees Doyle (Glenn Quinn), and later Cordelia (Charisma Carpenter). In doing so, he frequently clashes with the powerful law firm Wolfram & Hart, who represent the evil of the world. During this season (1999–2000), Buffy and Angel appear in each other's shows (the Buffy episode "Pangs" and the Angel episode "I Will Remember You"), but are forced to accept that nothing has changed and they still can not or should not be together. Later in the television season, Buffy crosses over into the episode "Sanctuary" where she attempts to kill rogue Slayer Faith (Eliza Dushku) to whom Angel shows compassion, and Angel appears in Buffy's "The Yoko Factor" where he squares off with Buffy's new boyfriend Riley (Marc Blucas). They finally decide to stay away from each other's business and stick to phone calls at this point. In the season 1 finale, Angel is given some hope at redemption when the Shanshu prophecy reveals that a vampire with a soul may eventually become human after fulfilling his role in the upcoming apocalypse.

In season 2 (2000–2001), Angel discovers that Wolfram & Hart has brought his sire and former lover Darla (Julie Benz) back from the dead in human form. Although Darla is intent on bringing back Angelus, Angel hopes to save her soul and help her seek redemption while she still has a chance. However, just as it looks like he might succeed, Wolfram & Hart bring in Drusilla to turn Darla back into a vampire. Angry at the law firm and embracing his darker side, Angel fires his employees, Cordelia, Wesley (Alexis Denisof) and Gunn (J. August Richards) (secretly to protect them from this dark territory, as he later revealed to Lorne (Andy Hallett)), and embarks on a vendetta against Wolfram & Hart, even allowing Darla and Dru to massacre a group of lawyers. Eventually losing faith in his mission, Angel has sex with Darla in the hopes of losing his soul. Instead, he experiences an epiphany and realizes that the good fight is still worth fighting. A disgusted Darla flees L.A. and Angel reconciles with his friends, who eventually forgive him. Angel also appears in Buffy season 5's "Forever", comforting Buffy after her mother's death.

Season 3 (2001–2002) sees Angel struggle with fatherhood when Darla returns pregnant with his child, despite the fact that vampires supposedly are unable to conceive. When Darla kills herself to give birth, Angel is left to raise the baby Connor (played by triplets Connor, Jake and Trenton Tupen) and protect him from those who wish to get their hands on a child of two vampires. False prophecies, time travel, and betrayal lead to Angel losing his infant son to an old enemy, Holtz (Keith Szarabajka), who abducts Connor into a hell dimension where time passes differently. Connor (Vincent Kartheiser) returns days later, fully grown and under the belief that Angel is a soulless monster. Holtz kills himself and Angel is framed for his death by Holtz's lover, prompting Connor to take revenge by sinking his father to the bottom of the ocean. Over the course of this season, Angel's friendship with his colleague Cordelia evolves into romance, but circumstances prevent him from ever confessing his feelings.

In Angel's fourth season (2002–2003), Angel is rescued from the ocean by his former friend Wesley. As Los Angeles crumbles under signs of the apocalypse, Angel is forced to cope with the romantic relationship between his son and Cordelia. In order to find out more about the Beast (Vladimir Kulich) terrorizing L.A., Angel Investigations remove Angel's soul and bring back Angelus after a vision from Cordelia suggests that Angelus has history with the Beast that Angel does not remember. Angelus, however, manages to escape, kills the Beast for fun and wreaks havoc until an old friend, Willow, manages to return his soul for the second time. It is eventually revealed that Cordelia has been possessed by the Beast's master, Jasmine (Gina Torres), a higher power who manipulated many events in Angel's life in order to be born in this world. Once born, she puts humanity under her thrall in the hopes of achieving world peace. When Angel restores free will and ruins Jasmine's plan, Wolfram & Hart offer him control of their L.A. branch as a reward for putting a stop to world peace. Angel accepts when they agree to rewrite Connor's memories of growing up in hell, allowing him to live a normal life with a new family. Afterwards, Angel appears in the penultimate and final episodes of Buffy, presenting Buffy with an amulet, which is given to Spike, to help her battle the First Evil.

In the fifth and final season of Angel (2003–2004), the character has made a deal with the Devil to become CEO of Wolfram & Hart's Los Angeles office. All of his friends have also become W&H employees, hoping to reform the organization from within under Angel's supervision. Angel's life this season is complicated by the increasingly blurred line between good and evil, the deaths of loved ones Cordelia and Fred (Amy Acker), and the possibility that the Shanshu prophecy may in fact be referring to Spike (who is now also a vampire with a soul and has joined the team) and not Angel. Allowing his friends to believe he is being corrupted, Angel secretly plots to bring down the Senior Partners of Wolfram & Hart by assassinating the Circle of the Black Thorn, the Partners' primary agents on Earth, even signing away his prophesied humanity in the process to convince them of his complex deception. Realizing that he may never be able to fully stop the forces of evil, Angel and his friends enter into a suicidal battle against the armies of the Senior Partners, and the series ends with the question of their survival unanswered.

Between 2001 and 2004, Joss Whedon and Jeph Loeb developed a 4-minute pilot episode for Buffy the Animated Series, which was set during the show's first season. Had the series been picked up by a network, it would have featured Angel (voiced by David Boreanaz) in more adventures set during Buffy's first season. Following a 2008 leak of the pilot to YouTube, Loeb expressed some hope that the series may be resurrected in some form.

=== Comic books ===
In 2007, Angel began appearing in two canonical continuations of Buffy the Vampire Slayer and Angel from Joss Whedon. The first of these was Buffy the Vampire Slayer Season Eight, published by Dark Horse Comics, which continued the story of the Buffy television series. Later that year, Whedon and IDW Publishing released the series Angel: After the Fall, which continued on from the series finale of Angel. The two series were published by different publishers due to Dark Horse initially giving up the rights to licensed Angel comic books several years ago when the series was still on air.

In Dark Horse's Buffy continuation, Angel initially appears to feature in Buffy's dream sequences (in the comic's third and twentieth issues, as well as in the Dark Horse Presents special Season Eight comic "Always Darkest"), but is later revealed to have been in the series from the beginning. He then features substantially in the remainder of the series. Angel features as the central character in IDW's After the Fall, however, which has no crossover with the events of Buffy. Whedon devised the storyline for After the Fall issues 1-17 with writer Brian Lynch, but did not write for the series himself as with Buffy. Beginning with the eighteenth issue of the series, IDW chose to continue telling Angel stories in an ongoing comic book with rotating writers and artists, although these stories "did not come from Whedon himself". In the continued series without Whedon's involvement, Angel engages in episodic adventures, while the series also takes breaks to focus on other characters. Subsequent writers included Bill Willingham. When rights to Angel settings and characters reverted to Dark Horse, IDW promised to end their ongoing Angel series with its forty-fourth issue in 2011, and began negotiating with Dark Horse so that it would bridge continuity with Season Eight and the upcoming Buffy the Vampire Slayer Season Nine. Its final Angel story is the hardcover send-off Angel Yearbook. During its tenure, IDW also published various miniseries depicting Angel and related characters, such as John Byrne's Angel: Blood and Trenches (2009), and several Illyria and Spike stories.

In After the Fall, set after the fifth season, Angel and his friends struggle as Los Angeles has been moved to a hell dimension by the Senior Partners who have also turned Angel human as a punishment. With the help of Wesley's ghost, magical spells to simulate his old abilities, and a friendly dragon (seen in "Not Fade Away") which he names after Cordelia, Angel continues helping the helpless. Angel eventually outsmarts and kills the Demon Lords of Los Angeles to win the city back for its people. Gunn, now a vampire out for revenge against Angel following the fight in the alley, confronts Angel, and brings him to the point of death. Cordelia's spirit comes to convince Angel to keep fighting, in spite of a vision of the "final battle" which sees Angel responsible for countless deaths. Wesley also confirms that Angel is still viable for the Shanshu prophecy, because his signed contract was never filed. Angel's body is subsequently taken by the Senior Partners and restored to health while Gunn successfully manages to restore the demon Illyria (introduced in season 5) to her true form, hoping she will restore time to before the Fall of Los Angeles only to embark on a destructive rampage instead. Gunn kills Connor, but rather than avenge the death Angel allows Gunn to kill him, forcing the Senior Partners to restore time back to before the Fall, as he is necessary to their plans. Restored to the fight in the alley with memories intact, Angel saves Gunn this time and later is happily reunited with Connor. Angel enjoys celebrity status from the citizens of Los Angeles, and gives Cordelia the dragon over to Groosalugg. As a mark of respect for his friends, he names a wing of the Los Angeles public library after Wesley and Fred; Wesley is no longer a ghost. Angel leaves the human, traumatised Gunn an Angel Investigations card and returns to his duties helping the hopeless.

In Season Eight, Twilight appears in the premiere issue, written by Whedon; his shoes are seen floating in the air as he surveys Buffy. At the end of the arc, the military general who coordinated a large-scale attack on Buffy is revealed to be a follower of "Twilight"; later issues show that many of the anti-Slayer forces serve under the leadership of a masked person known as Twilight. Buffy herself finally confronts Twilight in "A Beautiful Sunset", along with the Slayer Satsu, but Twilight's superior strength and ability to fly ensures his easy victory. In Jane Espenson's story arc "Retreat", Twilight locates Buffy's allies through their use of magic, forcing them to converge and retreat. In Tibet, Slayers and witches suppress their magic, which ultimately leads to a mutually destructive military conflict between the Slayers and Twilight's forces. In its aftermath, however, Buffy mysteriously acquires abilities conspicuously similar to Twilight's. In the penultimate arc, written by Brad Meltzer, the newly empowered Buffy faces up to her masked enemy again. Twilight reveals himself to be Angel, and claims to have been distracting the various groups that would seek to destroy Buffy while pushing her towards some other end. Buffy and Angel — destiny's agents in discarding the old reality and ushering in a new one — are overcome with desire for one another. They kiss, have sex and fly through space, eventually ascending to a dimension called Twilight. Meanwhile, Giles exposits a prophecy pertaining to the creation of a new universe, brought about by a Slayer falling in love with a vampire. The two come to their senses and return to Earth to fight off the hordes of demons unleashed by their ascension. Espenson's Riley one-shot flashes back to an uneasy Angel, early in his Twilight masquerade, convinced by Whistler (Angel's mentor in flashbacks from Buffy season 2) that this course of actions leads to the only possible future in which Buffy survives. The final arc, "Last Gleaming", depicts Angel's first encounter with the higher power which bestowed Twilight's superheroic abilities on him. Spike explains the next step in the prophecy, which concerns the new universe springing from the mystical Seed of Wonder, a source for all the magic in the universe, buried beneath Sunnydale. Although he tries to stop more of the damage caused by the Twilight dimension's coming, the Twilight dimension (the aforementioned higher power) possesses Angel. To protect the seed, a possessed Angel then tries to kill Buffy and Spike, and goes so far as to snap Giles' neck. This prompts Buffy to destroy the Seed. This stops the Twilight dimension from destroying the existing world, and Angel is dispossessed, but the universe is also stripped of all magic.

Following on from this, Angel headlines the series Angel and Faith, primarily set in London. Its stories aim to be respectful to the storylines featured in IDW's forty-four issue Angel run, and maintains a very tight continuity with Buffy Season Nine and other related comics. In his series, Angel faces the looming threat of his now unstable former mentor Whistler, who helped bring about his transformation into Twilight, as well as his two dangerous former acolytes, half-demons Pearl and Nash, in addition a group of British Slayers who cannot forgive his actions as Twilight. Along with Faith, he lives in Giles' London apartment where they are joined by Giles' ageless aunts, witches Lavinia and Sophronia. Angel intends to honor Giles' memory, and seeks to collect fragments of Giles' soul from magical items as part of a plan to resurrect him. In the series' conclusion, Giles is successfully resurrected, albeit as a young teenage boy, and the gang pursue Whistler, Pearl and Nash to a rooftop, where they plan to unleash a horrific magical plague on the world as an inelegant means to restore magic to the universe. Nash is killed, and Angel is able to persuade Whistler to see the error of his ways, successfully limiting to the extent of the plague to an area of Hackney in London. In the season's denouement, Faith returns to America alongside Giles, while Angel remains behind to guard over the plagued neighborhood, now called Magic Town, where residents—magically mutated into all manner of creature—are already causing problems.

A second volume of the series launched alongside Buffy the Vampire Slayer Season Ten in 2014. Angel defends Magic Town against threats such as Amy Madison during Faith's absence, and acquires several new allies: Eldre Koh, an ancient Nitobe demon freed from his prison by the end of magic; Detective Brandt; Rory, a magically-mutated bartender; and the mutant Tricia and her boyfriend Parker. Angel is also aided by Sophronia and Lavinia, as well as Nadira, a Slayer who hated him for his actions as Twilight but found inner peace after being mutated, and has a deep connection with the magic of Magic Town, which has become sentient. Following Illyria's death in Buffy Season Nine, Angel finds Fred alive again, having been restored by the reset of the laws of magic; she is forced to share her body with Illyria but is able to keep the ancient demon mostly under control. Faith also returns, now working for Zane Pharmaceuticals. A crossover with Buffy Season Ten reveals a new demon villain: Archaeus, who sired the Master and is able to control all the vampires from that bloodline, including Angel, Spike and Drusilla. Angel travels to San Francisco to help Buffy combat the demon lord, discovering that Buffy and Spike are now in a relationship, which Angel believes will not last. Meanwhile, Faith and Fred discover Drusilla in Magic Town, building a vampire army for Archaeus, who follows Angel back to London. The season ends with a conflict between Archaeus and his vampire army (including Drusilla and Detective Brandt), and Angel and his makeshift 'family' (Faith, Fred/Illyria, Koh, Nadira, Sophronia and Lavinia, and the Magic Town populace). Observing the battle, the sentient magic is almost convinced to join Archaeus, but ultimately defends Nadira from him and traps Archaeus inside a statue.

Dark Horse continued the official TV series storyline with Buffy the Vampire Slayer Season 11 and 12 from 2016 to 2108. Angel appeared in these books and Season 12:The reckoning was the official finale to Dark Horse's Buffyverse run before the license transferred.

In 2019 BOOM! Studios bought the license and rebooted the universe with modern reimaginings. Angel appeared in the comic books published from 2109 to 2023.

2029-2020 saw the release of a reimagined Angel solo series, written by Bryan Edward Hill. Starting at issue #9 in 2020 the Angel series was retitled Angel+Spike to focus on their buddy-cop style supernatural detective partnership. It lasted 17 issues.

Angel:Parallel Hell followed in 2022, it was an 8-issue series written by Christopher Cantwell that reimagined Angel as a famous TV star balancing his stradom with monster-hunting.

From 2022 to 2023 Angel also appeared in The Vampire Slayer, an alternate universe series where Willow becomes the Slayer instead of Buffy. Then BOOM!Studios decided not to continue the Buffyverse license. It was acquired by Dynamite Entertainment.

Dynamite Entertainment's new Angel Comic series launched in August 2026. It was written by Kelly Thompson with art by Giulia Giacomino. This release followed by 4 weeks the launch of Dynamite's main Buffy the Vampire Slayer title and kicked off the new run with an immediate crossover story.

== Reception ==
SFX magazine named Angel as the third greatest vampire in television and film, with rival Spike in first place. They stated that, while he could have worked simply as a brooding love-interest (Buffy) or redemption-seeking hero (Angel), the character also has a "wonderfully appealing, self-effacing humour, helped no end by Boreanaz's ability to look like a slapped puppy". While Angel could be "big and hard and manly", he could also be "sulky, pathetic, in need of a hug". They also cite his poor singing and dancing as examples of his "amusing awkwardness", which "spoke volumes about who he was". For his role in Buffy the Vampire Slayer season 2, Whatculture placed Angelus at number 1 on their list of Buffy Big Bads, alongside Spike and Drusilla, stating that having Buffy's lover become her enemy "emphasiz[es] the tragedy at the show’s centre that Buffy’s Slayer responsibilities mean she has to make difficult choices."

Angel was voted by thousands of Hello! readers as the sexiest on-screen vampire in 2009. He gathered 34 percent of the vote and finished ahead of other popular vampires like Edward Cullen, Eric Northman, Lestat de Lioncourt and Spike. Forbes named the series Angel as Hollywood's second most powerful vampire show. Rankings were based on television ratings, inflation-adjusted box office performance, as well as presence in popular culture through blog and press mentions since 1979.

== See also ==
- Forever Knight, 1992–1996, a Canadian TV series, also about a redemption-seeking vampire cursed with a conscience.
