= Hyde =

Hyde or Hydes may refer to:

== People ==
- Hyde (surname)
- Hyde (musician), Japanese musician from the bands L'Arc-en-Ciel and VAMPS

== American statutes ==
- Hyde Amendment, an amendment that places limitations on Medicare spending for abortion
- Hyde Amendment (1997), a federal statute that allows federal courts to award attorneys' fees and court costs to criminal defendants in some situations

== Fictional characters ==
- Dr Jekyll and Mr Hyde (character), character in Strange Case of Dr Jekyll and Mr Hyde, 1886 novella by Robert Louis Stevenson
- Mister Hyde (Marvel Comics), Marvel Comics supervillain
- Steven Hyde, a character in the U.S. TV series That 70s Show
- Hyde, character in Tensou Sentai Goseiger
- Hyde, character in Beyblade Burst Turbo
- Hyde Kido, the main protagonist of Under Night In-Birth series

== Places ==
=== England ===
- Hyde, Greater Manchester, a town in Tameside, North West England
  - Hyde (UK Parliament constituency), a former constituency
- Hyde, Bedfordshire, a parish near Luton (including East Hyde, West Hyde, and The Hyde)
- Hyde, a shrunken village in Gloucestershire, in the township of Pinnock and Hyde
- Hyde, Staffordshire, a hamlet near Kinver, on the Staffordshire/ Worcestershire border
- Hyde, Hampshire, a village in the New Forest
- Hyde, Winchester, a suburb of Winchester, Hampshire, containing the remains of Hyde Abbey
- West Hyde, Hertfordshire
- Hyde Heath, Buckinghamshire, a hamlet near Chesham
- The Hyde, London, an area in the London Borough of Barnet
- Hyde End, Berkshire
- Hyde End, Buckinghamshire
- Hyde Lea, a village in Staffordshire

=== United States ===
- Hydes, Maryland
- Hyde, Michigan
- Hyde, Pennsylvania
- Hyde, Wisconsin
- Hyde County, North Carolina
- Hyde County, South Dakota
- Hydes Lake, a lake in Minnesota

=== Elsewhere ===
- Hyde (Cappadocia), town of ancient Cappadocia, now in Turkey
- Hyde, New Zealand
- Hyde Glacier, Antarctica

== Other uses ==
- Hyde (company), multinational electronic cigarette company
- Hyde School (Bath), in Bath, Maine and Woodstock, Connecticut, US
- M2 Hyde, submachine-gun produced for the US Army from 1942 to 1943
- Hyde Act, United States–India Peaceful Atomic Energy Cooperation Act of 2006
- Hyde F.C., English Conference football team
- Hyde Middle School, a middle school in Cupertino, California, US
- Holt Hyde, a character in the Monster High franchise
- Hyde (EP), an EP by VIXX
- Hyde Chronicle, mediaeval chronicle

== See also ==
- Dr. Jekyll and Mr. Hyde (disambiguation)
- Hide (disambiguation)
- Hyd (disambiguation)
- Hyde Park (disambiguation)
- Hyde Hall (disambiguation)
