= Hide =

Hide or hides may refer to:

== Common uses ==
- Hide (skin), the cured skin of an animal
- Bird hide, a structure for observing birds and other wildlife without causing disturbance
- Gamekeeper's hide or hunting hide or hunting blind, a structure to hide in when viewing or hunting wildlife
- Hide (unit), a unit of land area or land-based tax assessment used in early medieval England
- Hide-and-seek, the children's game
- A lair, a structure or object for animals to hide within, in some cases necessary to that animal's habit/lifestyle

== People ==
- Hide (surname)
- Hide (musician) (1964–1998), musician from the band X Japan
- Hirata Hide (平田 ヒデ, 1902–1978), Japanese politician
- Hidehiko Hoshino (born 1966), musician from the band Buck-Tick
- Hide Kawanishi (川西 英, 1894–1965), Japanese painter
- Hide Koga (古賀 英彦, born 1939), Japanese multifaceted career in professional baseball
- Hidé Ishiguro (石黒 ひで, born 1935), Japanese analytic philosopher
- Hide Mineshima (峰出番島 秀, born 1916), Japanese discus thrower
- Hide Vitalucci (ヒデ・ケンゲイ・ヴィタルッシー, born 2002), Japanese professional footballer

== Film and TV ==
- The Hide, a 2008 thriller film based on the stage play The Sociable Plover by Tim Whitnall
- Hide, a 2008 action film starring Rachel Miner
- Hide, a 2011 television film directed by John Gray
- "Hide" (Doctor Who), 2013 episode
- Hide (TV series), a 2024 South Korean television series

== Music ==
- Hide album by The Bloody Beetroots 2013
- Hide (album), a 2010 album by experimental band Foetus

=== Songs ===
- "Hide" (Creed song), a 2002 song from the album Weathered by Creed
- "Hide" (Joy Williams song), from the album Genesis
- "Hide", a song by Dinosaur Jr. from their 1993 album Where You Been
- "Hide", a song by Scott Grimes from his 2010 album Drive
- "Hide", a song by Ty Herndon from his 2005 album Right About Now

== Other uses ==
- Hides gas field, Papua New Guinea
- Hide (novel), a 2022 horror novel by Kiersten White

== See also ==
- Hyde (disambiguation)
- Rawhide (disambiguation)
- Hyde (surname)
