= Mister Magic (disambiguation) =

Mister Magic may refer to:

== Music ==
- Mr. Magic (1956–2009), rap and hip-hop pioneer and radio DJ
- Mr. Magic (1975–2013), an alternative name for American rapper Magic
- Mister Magic, 1975 album by jazz saxophonist Grover Washington, Jr., or the title track composed by Ralph MacDonald and William Slater
- Mr. Magico, a character and former member on shock rock band Gwar

== Sports ==
- Mr. Magic, also "The Magic Man", nicknames of Swedish ice hockey player Kent Nilsson
- Mr. Magic, Turkish professional billiards player Semih Saygıner

== Literature ==
- Mister Magic, a novel by American author Kiersten White published in 2023.
