= Buffy the Vampire Slayer =

American supernatural television series (1997–2003)

- Genre: Action; Comedy-drama; Coming-of-age; Horror; Philosophical; Supernatural; Teen drama
- Created by: Joss Whedon
- Showrunners: Joss Whedon; Marti Noxon
- Starring: Sarah Michelle Gellar; Nicholas Brendon; Alyson Hannigan; Charisma Carpenter; Anthony Stewart Head; David Boreanaz; Seth Green; James Marsters; Marc Blucas; Emma Caulfield; Michelle Trachtenberg; Amber Benson
- Theme music composer: Nerf Herder
- Composers: Walter Murphy; Christophe Beck; Shawn Clement; Sean Murray; Thomas Wander; Robert Duncan
- Country of origin: United States
- Original language: English
- No. of seasons: 7
- No. of episodes: 144 (list of episodes)

Production
- Executive producers: Joss Whedon; David Greenwalt; Marti Noxon; David Fury; Fran Rubel Kuzui; Kaz Kuzui
- Camera setup: Single-camera
- Running time: 42–51 minutes
- Production companies: Mutant Enemy Productions; Sandollar Television; Kuzui Enterprises; 20th Century Fox Television

Original release
- Network: The WB
- Release: March 10, 1997 – May 22, 2001
- Network: UPN
- Release: October 2, 2001 – May 20, 2003

Related
- Angel

Buffy the Vampire Slayer is an American supernatural horror drama television series created by Joss Whedon. The show's concept is based on the 1992 film written by Whedon, although they are separate and distinct productions. Whedon served as executive producer and showrunner of the series under his production company Mutant Enemy Productions. It aired on The WB from March 10, 1997, to May 22, 2001, and later on UPN from October 2, 2001, to May 20, 2003.

The series follows Buffy Summers (Sarah Michelle Gellar), the latest in a succession of young women known as "Vampire Slayers". Slayers are chosen by fate to battle against vampires, demons and other forces of darkness. Buffy wants to live a normal life, but learns to embrace her destiny as the series progresses. Like previous Slayers, she is aided by a Watcher, part of the Watcher's Council based in England, who guides, teaches and trains her. Unlike her predecessors, Buffy surrounds herself with loyal friends who sometimes refer to themselves as the "Scoobies". The show primarily takes place in the fictional setting of Sunnydale, a small Southern California city located on a "Hellmouth", a convergence point of mystical energies. Because of this, supernatural creatures and beings with magical powers, both good and evil, are drawn to Sunnydale or rise from below ground to menace the town and world.

The series received critical and popular acclaim, and is often listed among the greatest television series of all time. Original airings often reached four to six million viewers. Although lower than successful shows on the "big four" networks (ABC, CBS, NBC and Fox), these ratings were a success for the relatively new and smaller WB Television Network. Despite being mostly ignored in above-the-line categories by the Emmys, the series was nominated for the American Film Institute Award for Drama Series of the Year, Gellar was nominated for the Golden Globe Award for Best Actress – Television Series Drama for her performance in the show and the series was nominated five times for Television Critics Association Awards, winning in 2003 for the Television Critics Association Heritage Award.

The success of Buffy has led to hundreds of tie-in products, including novels, comics and video games. The series has received attention in fandom (including fan films), parody, and academia, and has influenced the direction of other television series. Buffy was part of a wave of television series from the late 1990s and early 2000s that featured strong female characters, alongside Charmed, Xena: Warrior Princess, La Femme Nikita, Dark Angel, and Alias. The series, as well as its spin-off series, Angel, and extensions thereof, have been collectively termed the "Buffyverse".

== Premise ==
=== Characters ===
Buffy Summers (played by Sarah Michelle Gellar) is the "Slayer", one in a long line of young women chosen by fate to battle evil forces. This mystical calling grants her powers that dramatically increase physical strength, endurance, agility, accelerated healing, intuition, and a limited degree of precognition, usually in the form of prophetic dreams. She is known as a reluctant hero who wants to live a normal life. However, she learns to embrace her destiny as the vampire slayer.

Buffy receives guidance from her Watcher, Rupert Giles (Anthony Stewart Head). Giles, rarely referred to by his first name (it is later revealed that in his rebellious younger days he went by "Ripper"), is a member of the Watchers' Council, whose job is to train and guide the Slayers. Giles researches the supernatural creatures that Buffy must face, offers insights into their origins and advice on how to defeat them, and helps her train to stay in fighting form.

Buffy also receives help from the friends she meets at Sunnydale High School: Willow Rosenberg (Alyson Hannigan) and Xander Harris (Nicholas Brendon). Willow is originally a wallflower who excels at academics, providing a contrast to Buffy's outgoing personality and less-than-stellar educational record. They share the social isolation that comes with being different, and especially from being exceptional young women. As the series progresses, Willow becomes a more assertive character and a powerful witch, and realizes she is a lesbian. In contrast, Xander, with no supernatural abilities, provides comic relief and a grounded perspective. Buffy and Willow are the only characters who appear in all 144 episodes, with Xander appearing in 143.

The cast of characters grew over the course of the series. Buffy first arrives in Sunnydale with her mother, Joyce Summers (Kristine Sutherland), who functions as an anchor of normality in the Summers' lives even after she learns of Buffy's role in the supernatural world ("Becoming, Part Two"). Buffy's younger sister Dawn Summers (Michelle Trachtenberg) is introduced in season five ("Buffy vs. Dracula"). Angel (David Boreanaz), a vampire cursed with a soul, is Buffy's love interest throughout the first three seasons. He leaves Buffy after realizing he will never be able to give her a normal life. He goes on to make amends for his sins and to search for redemption in his own spin-off television series, Angel. He makes several guest appearances in the remaining seasons, and is present in Buffy's final episode.

At Sunnydale High, Buffy meets several other students besides Willow and Xander willing to join her fight for good, an informal group eventually tagged the "Scooby Gang" or "Scoobies". Cordelia Chase (Charisma Carpenter), the archetypal shallow cheerleader, reluctantly becomes involved. Daniel "Oz" Osbourne (Seth Green), a fellow student, rock guitarist and werewolf, joins the group through his relationship with Willow. Jenny Calendar (Robia LaMorte), Sunnydale's computer science teacher, joins the group after helping destroy a demon trapped in cyberspace during season 1; she later becomes Giles' love interest. Anya (Emma Caulfield) is a former vengeance demon called Anyanka who specialized in avenging scorned women; after losing her powers she became Xander's lover, then joined the Scoobies in season four.

In Buffy's senior year at high school, she meets Faith (Eliza Dushku), another Slayer called forth when Slayer Kendra Young (Bianca Lawson) was killed by vampire Drusilla (Juliet Landau) in season two. Although Faith initially fights on the side of good with Buffy and the rest of the group, she later joins forces with Mayor Richard Wilkins (Harry Groener) after accidentally killing a human. She reappears briefly in the fourth season, looking for vengeance, and moves to Angel where she voluntarily goes to jail for her crimes. Faith reappears in season seven of Buffy, after having helped Angel and his crew, and fights alongside Buffy against the First Evil.

Buffy gathers other allies throughout the series: Spike (James Marsters), a vampire, is an old companion of Angelus (Angel) and one of Buffy's major enemies in early seasons, although he and Buffy later become allies and lovers. At the end of season six, Spike regains his soul. Spike is known for his Billy Idol-style peroxide blond hair and his black leather coat, stolen from a previous Slayer, Nikki Wood. Nikki's son, Robin Wood (D. B. Woodside), joins the group in the final season. Tara Maclay (Amber Benson) is a fellow member of Willow's Wicca group during season four, and their friendship evolves into a romantic relationship. Anya, an ex-vengeance demon joins the group and becomes Xander's girlfriend. Buffy becomes involved personally and professionally with Riley Finn (Marc Blucas), a military operative in "the Initiative", which hunts demons using science and technology. The seventh and final season sees geeky wannabe-villain Andrew Wells (Tom Lenk) side with the Scoobies after initially being their captive/hostage; they regard him more as a nuisance than an ally.

Buffy featured dozens of major and minor recurring characters. For example, the "Big Bad" (villain) characters were featured for at least one season (for example, Glory is a character who appeared in 12 episodes, spanning much of season five). Similarly, characters who allied themselves to the group and characters who attended the same institutions were sometimes featured in multiple episodes.

=== Setting and filming locations ===
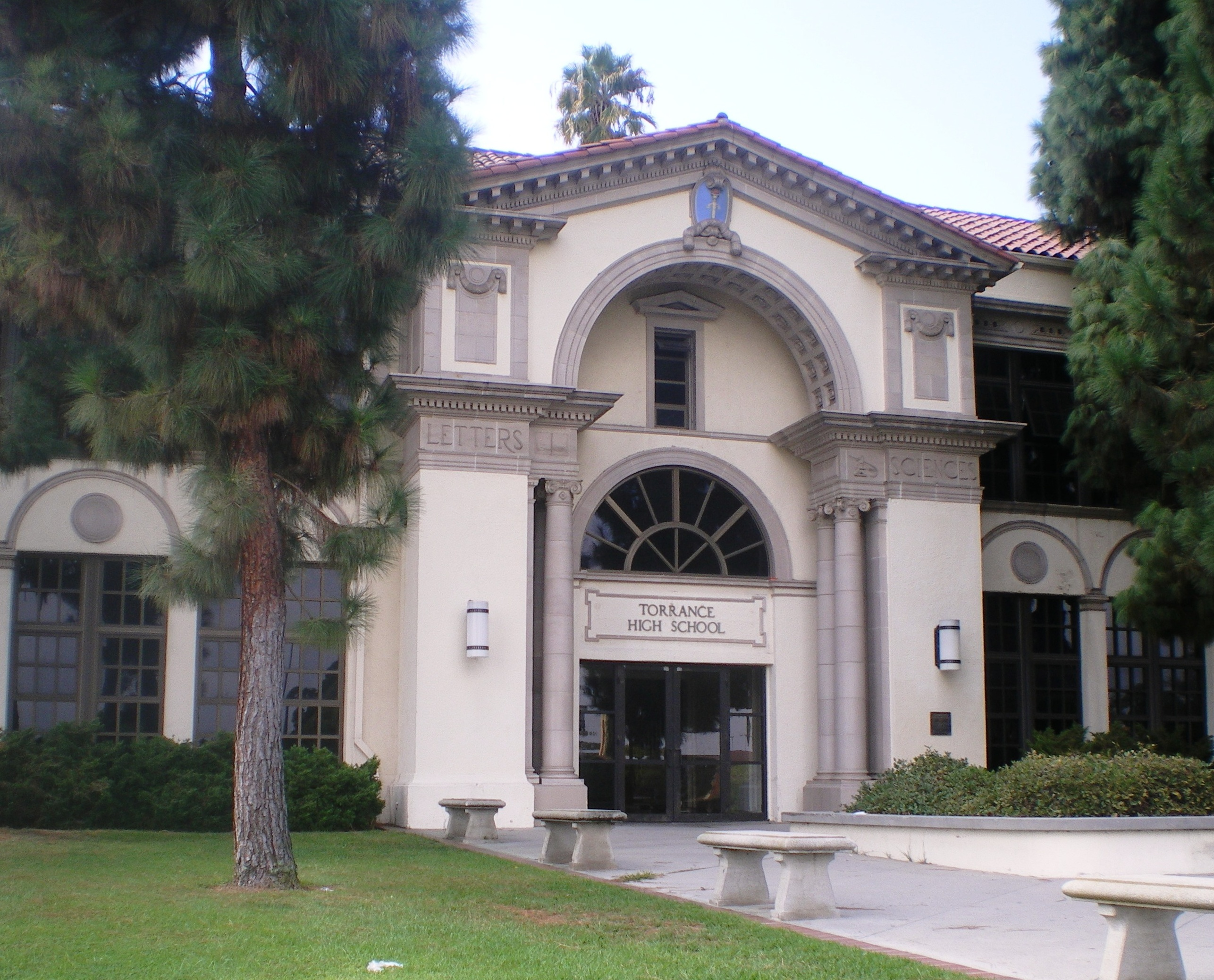
Torrance High School was used for the fictional Sunnydale High School (2008)

The show is set in the fictional California town of Sunnydale, whose suburban Sunnydale High School sits on top of a "Hellmouth", a gateway to demon realms. The Hellmouth, located beneath the school library, is a source of mystical energies as well as a nexus for a wide variety of evil creatures and supernatural phenomena. Joss Whedon cited the Hellmouth and "high school as hell" as one of the primary metaphors in creating the series.

Most of Buffy was shot on location in Los Angeles, California. The high school used in the first three seasons is actually Torrance High School, in Torrance, California, the same high school used for Beverly Hills, 90210. The show was initially very dependent on location shooting, because the production budget allowed for few permanent sets to be built. In the first season this was limited to the interior of Sunnydale High (the library, hallways, and classrooms), Buffy's bedroom, and the Master's underground lair. Starting in the second season, more permanent sets were built, including the full interior of Buffy's house, Angel's mansion, and Giles's apartment, as well as extensions to the high school set (the addition of a dining hall and commons area). A driveway area near the gated entrance to Fox Studios was transformed into a graveyard. In the third season the Sunnydale "Main Street" was constructed on the backlot, which would be a staple location for the rest of the series. When the show transitioned to college in the fourth season, the hallway sets from Sunnydale High were remodeled to appear as the interior hallways of UC Sunnydale.

Some of the exterior shots of the college Buffy attends, UC Sunnydale, were filmed at UCLA. Several episodes include shots from the Oviatt Library at California State University, Northridge. The exterior of the Crawford Street mansion where Angelus, Spike, and Drusilla lived was Frank Lloyd Wright's Ennis House.

=== Format ===
Buffy is told in a serialized format, mixing complex, season-long storylines with a villain-of-the-week conflict revolving around Buffy and her friends as they struggle to balance the fight against supernatural evils with their complicated social lives. A typical episode contains one or more villains, or supernatural phenomena, that are thwarted or defeated by the end of the episode. Though elements and relationships are explored and ongoing subplots are included, the show focuses primarily on Buffy and her role as an archetypal heroine. Gellar described the show as "the ultimate metaphor: horrors of adolescence manifesting through these actual monsters. It's the hardest time of life." Each season's storyline is broken down into season-long narratives marked by the rise and defeat of a powerful antagonist, commonly referred to as the "Big Bad".

While the show is mainly a drama with frequent comic relief, most episodes blend different genres, including horror, martial arts, romance, melodrama, farce, fantasy, supernatural, comedy, and, in one episode, musical comedy.

In the first few seasons, the most prominent monsters in the Buffy bestiary are vampires based on traditional myths, lore, and literary conventions. As the series continues, Buffy and her companions fight an increasing variety of demons, as well as ghosts, werewolves, zombies, and unscrupulous humans. They frequently save the world from annihilation by a combination of physical combat, magic, and detective-style investigation, and are guided by an extensive collection of ancient and mystical reference books.

== Episodes ==
Season	Episodes	Originally released		
Season	Episodes	First released	Last released	Network
1	12	March 10, 1997	June 2, 1997	The WB
2	22	September 15, 1997	May 19, 1998	The WB
3	22	September 29, 1998	September 21, 1999	The WB
4	22	October 5, 1999	May 23, 2000	The WB
5	22	September 26, 2000	May 22, 2001	The WB
6	22	October 2, 2001	May 21, 2002	UPN
7	22	September 24, 2002	May 20, 2003	UPN

=== Plot summary ===
Season one exemplifies the "high school is hell" concept. Buffy Summers has just moved to Sunnydale after burning down her old school's gym and hopes to escape her Slayer duties. Her plans are complicated by Rupert Giles, her new Watcher, who reminds her of the inescapable presence of evil. Sunnydale High is built atop a Hellmouth, a portal to demon dimensions that attracts supernatural phenomena to the area. A mysterious man, Angel, warns Buffy of upcoming danger. She eventually discovers that he is a vampire cursed with a soul, which prevents him from feeding off living humans. Buffy befriends two schoolmates, Xander Harris and Willow Rosenberg, who help her fight evil throughout the series. Buffy, her Watcher and friends later start to collectively call themselves the "Scooby Gang". Their first major threat is the Master, an ancient and especially threatening vampire, who was trapped in the Hellmouth underground. When he escapes, Buffy defeats him and saves Sunnydale.

The emotional stakes are raised in season two. Vampire couple Spike and Drusilla come to town. A new slayer, Kendra, who is activated as a result of Buffy's brief death in season one, also arrives in Sunnydale. Popular schoolmate Cordelia Chase, who resented Buffy and her friends, joins the Scooby Gang and becomes involved with Xander. Willow learns witchcraft and becomes involved with schoolmate Daniel "Oz" Osbourne, who is a werewolf. The romantic relationship between Buffy and the vampire Angel develops. But after they have sex, Angel experiences a moment of true happiness, breaking the curse that gave him his soul, thus reverting him to a sadistic killer. The evil vampire, famously known as Angelus, joins the other vampires Spike and Drusilla, and he torments Buffy and her friends. He murders multiple innocents and Giles's new girlfriend Jenny Calendar, a Romani woman who was sent to maintain Angel's curse. Kendra is murdered by Drusilla. To avert an apocalypse, Buffy is forced to banish Angel to a hell dimension just moments after Willow has restored his soul. The ordeal leaves Buffy emotionally shattered, and she leaves Sunnydale.

After attempting to start a new life in Los Angeles, Buffy returns to town in season three. Angel has been mysteriously released from the demon dimension but is close to insanity due to the torment he suffered there. He recovers, but he and Buffy realize that a relationship between them can never happen and Angel leaves Sunnydale at the end of the season. Giles is fired from the Watchers' Council because he has developed a "father's love" for Buffy and he is replaced by Wesley Wyndam-Pryce. Towards the end of the season, Buffy announces that she will no longer be working for the council. Early in the season, she meets Faith, the Slayer activated after Kendra's death. She also encounters the affable Mayor Richard Wilkins III, who secretly has plans to "ascend" (become a "pure" demon) on Sunnydale High's graduation day. Although Faith initially works well with Buffy, she becomes increasingly unstable after accidentally killing a human and forms a relationship with the paternal yet manipulative mayor. The rivalry between Buffy and Faith eventually lands Faith in a coma. At the end of the season, after the mayor becomes a huge snake-like demon, Buffy, Angel, the Scooby Gang and the entire graduating class destroy him by blowing up Sunnydale High. At the end of the season, Angel and Cordelia leave the series to star in the spin-off series, Angel.

Season four sees Buffy and Willow enroll at UC Sunnydale, while Xander joins the workforce and begins dating Anya, a former vengeance demon. Spike returns as a series regular and is abducted by The Initiative, a top-secret military installation based beneath the UC Sunnydale campus. They implant a microchip in his head that prevents him from harming humans. Every time he tries to harm a human, he suffers excruciating pain. Upon learning that he can still harm other demons, he joins in with the Scooby Gang, purely for the joy of fighting. Oz leaves town after realizing that he is too dangerous as a werewolf, and Willow falls in love with Tara Maclay, another witch. Faith awakens from her coma and escapes from Sunnydale to L.A. Buffy begins dating Riley Finn, a graduate student and US Army Ranger seconded to The Initiative. Although appearing to be a well-meaning anti-demon operation, The Initiative's sinister plans are revealed when Adam, a monster secretly built from parts of humans, demons and machinery, escapes and begins to wreak havoc on the town. Adam is destroyed by a magical composite of Buffy and her three friends, and The Initiative is shut down.

During season five, a younger sister, Dawn, suddenly appears in Buffy's life; although she is new to the series, to the characters it is as if she has always been there. Buffy is confronted by Glory, an exiled Hell God who is searching for a "Key" that will allow her to return to her Hell dimension and in the process blur the lines between dimensions and unleash Hell on Earth. It is later discovered that the Key's protectors have used Buffy's blood to turn the Key into human form–Dawn–concurrently implanting everybody with lifelong memories of her. The Watchers' Council aids in Buffy's research on Glory, and she and Giles are both reinstated on their own terms. Riley leaves early in the season after realizing that Buffy does not love him and joins a military demon-hunting operation. Spike, still implanted with his chip from The Initiative, realizes he is in love with Buffy and increasingly helps the Scoobies in their fight. Buffy's mother Joyce dies of a brain aneurysm, while at the end of the season, Xander proposes to Anya. Glory finally discovers that Dawn is the key and kidnaps her, using Dawn's blood to open a portal to the Hell dimension. To save Dawn, Buffy sacrifices her own life by diving into the portal, thus closing it with her death.

At the beginning of season six, Buffy has been dead for 147 days, but Buffy's friends resurrect her through a powerful spell, believing they have rescued her from a Hell dimension. Buffy returns in a deep depression, explaining (several episodes later) that she had been in heaven and is devastated to be pulled back to earth. Giles returns to England because he has concluded that Buffy has become too reliant on him, while Buffy takes up a fast-food job to support herself and Dawn and develops a secret, mutually abusive sexual relationship with Spike. Dawn suffers from kleptomania and feelings of alienation, Xander leaves Anya at the altar (after which she once again becomes a vengeance demon), and Willow becomes addicted to magic, causing Tara to temporarily leave her. They also begin to deal with the Trio, a group of nerds led by Warren Mears who use their proficiency in technology and magic to attempt to kill Buffy and take over Sunnydale. Warren is shown to be the only competent villain of the group and, after Buffy thwarts his plans multiple times, the Trio breaks apart. Warren becomes unhinged and attacks Buffy with a gun, accidentally killing Tara in the process. This causes Willow to descend into nihilistic darkness and unleash all of her dark magical powers, killing Warren and attempting to kill his friends. Giles returns to face her in battle and infuses her with light magic, tapping into her remaining humanity. This overwhelms Willow with guilt and pain, whereupon she attempts to destroy the world to end everyone's suffering, although it eventually allows Xander to reach through her pain and end her rampage. Late in the season, after losing control and trying to rape Buffy, Spike leaves Sunnydale and travels to see a demon and asks him to "return him to what he used to be" so that he can "give Buffy what she deserves". After Spike passes a series of brutal tests, the demon restores his soul.

During season seven, it is revealed that Buffy's second resurrection caused instability in the slayer line which also allowed the First Evil to begin tipping the balance between good and evil. It begins by hunting down and killing inactive Potential Slayers and soon raises an army of ancient, powerful Turok-Han vampires. After the Watchers' Council is destroyed, a number of Potential Slayers (some brought by Giles) take refuge in Buffy's house. Faith returns to help fight the First Evil, and the new Sunnydale High School principal, Robin Wood, also joins the cause. The Turok-Han vampires and a sinister, misogynistic preacher known as Caleb begin causing havoc for the Scoobies. As the Hellmouth becomes more active, nearly all of Sunnydale's population–humans and demons alike–flee. In the series finale, Buffy kills Caleb and Angel returns to Sunnydale with an amulet, which Buffy gives to Spike; the Scoobies then surround the Hellmouth, and the Potential Slayers descend into its cavern while Willow casts a spell that activates their Slayer powers. Anya dies in the fight, as do some of the new Slayers. Spike's amulet channels the power of the sun to destroy the Hellmouth and all the vampires within it, including himself. The collapse of the cavern creates a crater that swallows all of Sunnydale, while the survivors of the battle escape in a school bus. In the final scene, as the survivors survey the crater, Dawn asks, "What are we going to do now?" Buffy slowly begins to enigmatically smile as she contemplates the future ahead of her, ending the series on a hopeful note.

== Production ==
=== Origins ===
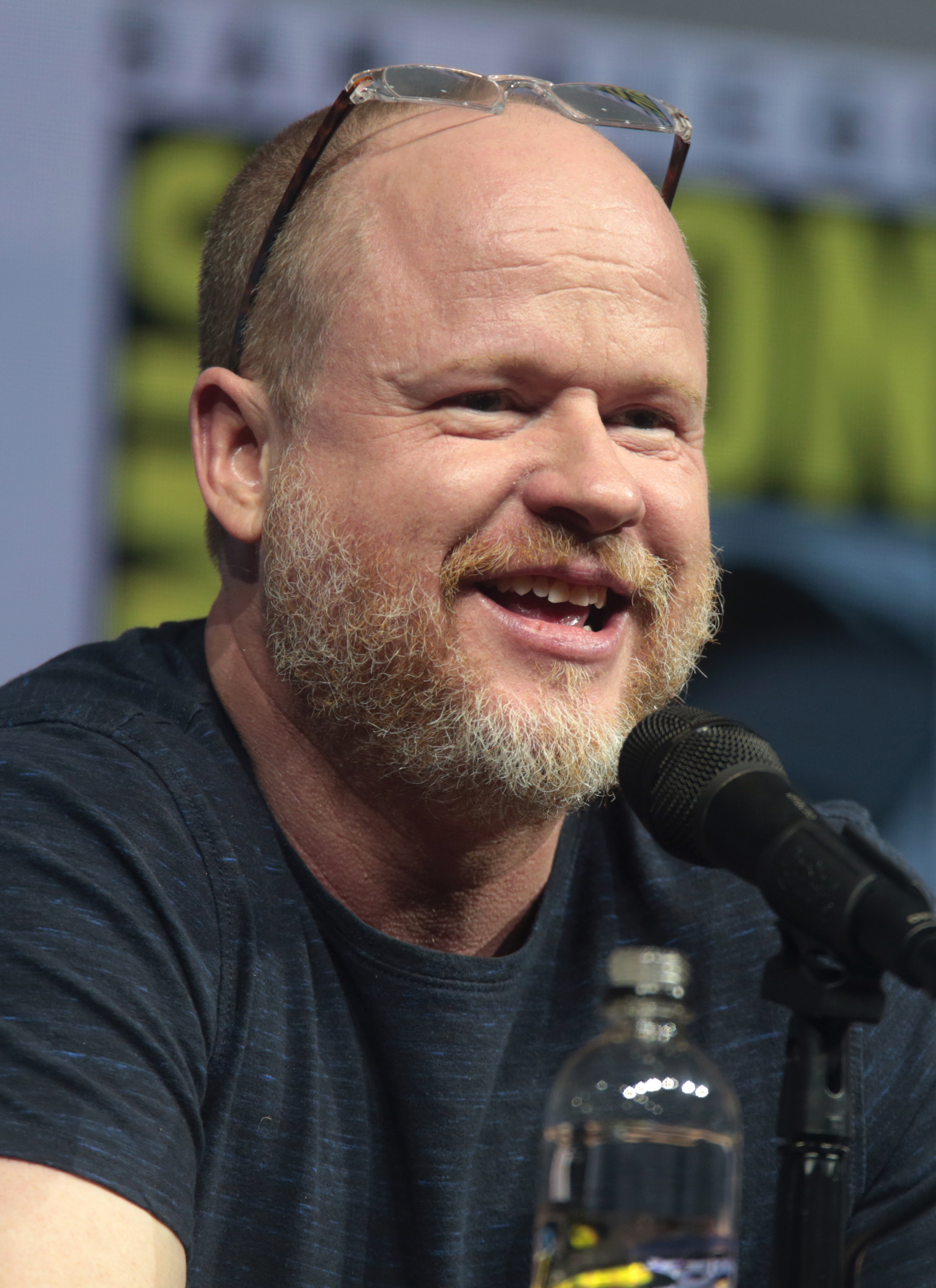
Buffy creator Joss Whedon (2018) also served as executive producer, head writer, and director on the series.

Writer Joss Whedon says that "Rhonda the Immortal Waitress" was really the first incarnation of the Buffy concept, "the idea of some woman who seems to be completely insignificant who turns out to be extraordinary". This early, unproduced idea evolved into Buffy, which Whedon developed to invert the Hollywood formula of "the little blonde girl who goes into a dark alley and gets killed in every horror movie". Whedon wanted "to subvert that idea and create someone who was a hero". He explained, "The very first mission statement of the show was the joy of female power: having it, using it, sharing it."

The idea was first visited through Whedon's script for the 1992 movie Buffy the Vampire Slayer, which featured Kristy Swanson in the title role. The director, Fran Rubel Kuzui, saw it as a "pop culture comedy about what people think about vampires". Whedon disagreed: "I had written this scary film about an empowered woman, and they turned it into a broad comedy. It was crushing." The script was praised within the industry, but the movie was not.

Some years later, Gail Berman (later a Fox executive, but at that time president and CEO of the production company Sandollar Television, who owned the TV rights to the movie) approached Whedon to develop his Buffy concept into a television series. Whedon explained that "They said, 'Do you want to do a show?' And I thought, 'High school as a horror movie.' And so the metaphor became the central concept behind Buffy, and that's how I sold it." The supernatural elements in the series stood as metaphors for personal anxieties associated with adolescence and young adulthood. Early in its development, the series was going to be simply titled Slayer. Whedon went on to write and partly fund a 25-minute non-broadcast pilot that was shown to networks and eventually sold to the WB Network. The latter promoted the premiere with a series of History of the Slayer clips, and the first episode aired on March 10, 1997. Whedon has declared in June 2003 that the non-broadcast pilot would not be included with DVDs of the series "while there is strength in these bones", stating that it "sucks on ass". Dolly Parton was an uncredited producer of the film and series, as co-owner of Sandollar Productions.

=== Executive producers ===
Joss Whedon was credited as executive producer throughout the run of the series, and for the first five seasons (1997–2001) he was also the showrunner, supervising the writing and all aspects of production. Marti Noxon took on the role for seasons six and seven (2001–2003), but Whedon continued to be involved with writing and directing Buffy alongside projects such as Angel, Fray, and Firefly. Fran Rubel Kuzui and her husband, Kaz Kuzui, were credited as executive producers but were not involved in the show. Their credit, rights, and royalties over the franchise relate to their funding, producing, and directing of the original movie version of Buffy.

=== Writing ===
Script-writing was done by Mutant Enemy, a production company created by Whedon in 1997. The writers with the most writing credits are Joss Whedon, Steven S. DeKnight, Jane Espenson, David Fury, Drew Goddard, Drew Greenberg, David Greenwalt, Rebecca Rand Kirshner, Marti Noxon and Doug Petrie. Other authors with writing credits include Dean Batali, Carl Ellsworth, Tracey Forbes, Ashley Gable, Howard Gordon, Diego Gutierrez, Elin Hampton, Rob Des Hotel, Matt Kiene, Ty King, Thomas A. Swyden, Joe Reinkemeyer, Dana Reston and Dan Vebber.

Jane Espenson has explained how scripts came together. First, the writers talked about the emotional issues facing Buffy Summers and how she would confront them through her battle against evil supernatural forces. Then the episode's story was broken into acts and scenes. Act breaks were designed as key moments to intrigue viewers so that they would stay with the episode following the commercial break. The writers collectively filled in scenes surrounding these act breaks for a more fleshed-out story. A whiteboard marked their progress by mapping brief descriptions of each scene. Once breaking was complete, the credited author wrote an outline for the episode, which was checked by Whedon or Noxon. The writer then wrote a full script, which went through a series of drafts, and finally a quick rewrite from the showrunner. The final article was used as the shooting script.

=== Music ===
Buffy features a mix of original, indie, rock, and pop music. The composers spent around seven days scoring between fourteen and thirty minutes of music for each episode. Christophe Beck revealed that the Buffy composers used computers and synthesizers and were limited to recording one or two "real" samples. Despite this, their goal was to produce "dramatic" orchestration that would stand up to film scores.

Alongside the score, most episodes featured indie rock music, usually at the characters' venue of choice, The Bronze. Buffy music supervisor John King explained that "we like to use unsigned bands" that "you would believe would play in this place". For example, the fictional group Dingoes Ate My Baby were portrayed on screen by front group Four Star Mary. Pop songs by famous artists were rarely featured prominently, but several episodes spotlighted the sounds of more famous artists such as Sarah McLachlan, The Brian Jonestown Massacre, Blink-182, Third Eye Blind, Aimee Mann (who also had a line of dialogue), The Dandy Warhols, Cibo Matto, Coldplay, Lisa Loeb, K's Choice, and Michelle Branch. The popularity of music used in Buffy has led to the release of four soundtrack albums: Buffy the Vampire Slayer: The Album, Radio Sunnydale, the "Once More, with Feeling" Soundtrack, and Buffy the Vampire Slayer: The Score.

=== Special effects ===
Buffy features a variety of monsters and supernatural creatures. Monster suits were created by John Vulich and his special effects company Optic Nerve, while blending and beauty makeup was created by makeup supervisor Todd McIntosh. McIntosh is credited with creating the iconic vampire face Buffy is known for, inspired by McIntosh's love for shows like the Gothic soap opera Dark Shadows.

=== Inspirations and metaphors ===
During the first year of the series, Whedon described the show as "My So-Called Life with The X-Files". Alongside these series, Whedon has cited cult film Night of the Comet as a "big influence", and credited the X-Men character Kitty Pryde as a significant influence on the character of Buffy. The authors of the unofficial guidebook Dusted point out that the series was often a pastiche, borrowing elements from previous horror novels, movies, and short stories and from such common literary stock as folklore and mythology. Nevitt and Smith describe Buffy's use of pastiche as "postmodern Gothic". For example, the Adam character parallels the Frankenstein monster, the episode "Bad Eggs" parallels Invasion of the Body Snatchers, "Out of Mind, Out of Sight" parallels The Invisible Man, and so on.

Buffy episodes frequently include a deeper meaning or metaphor. Whedon explained, "We think very carefully about what we're trying to say emotionally, politically, and even philosophically while we're writing it... it really is, apart from being a pop-culture phenomenon, something that is deeply layered textually episode by episode." Academics Wilcox and Lavery provide examples of episodes dealing with real life issues portrayed as supernatural metaphors:

In the world of Buffy the problems that teenagers face become literal monsters. A mother can take over her daughter's life ("Witch"); a strict stepfather-to-be really is a heartless machine ("Ted"); a young lesbian fears that her nature is demonic ("Goodbye Iowa" and "Family"); a girl who has sex with even the nicest-seeming guy may discover that he afterward becomes a monster ("Innocence").

The love affair between the vampire Angel and Buffy was fraught with metaphors. For example, their night of passion cost the vampire his soul. Sarah Michelle Gellar said: "That's the ultimate metaphor. You sleep with a guy and he turns bad on you". Marsters said that his character was part of an audience-and network-forced change for the show; themes about overcoming adolescent problems gave way to "problems that are kind of sexy", frustrating Whedon.

Buffy struggles throughout the series with her calling as Slayer and the loss of freedom this entails, frequently sacrificing teenage experiences for her Slayer duties. Her difficulties and eventual empowering realizations are reflections of several dichotomies faced by modern women and echo feminist issues within society.

In the episode "Becoming (Part 2)", when Joyce learns that Buffy is the Slayer, her reaction has strong echoes of a parent discovering her child is gay, including denial, suggesting that she tries "not being a Slayer", before ultimately kicking Buffy out of the house.

=== Casting ===
Katie Holmes and Selma Blair were in the running for the role of Buffy in 1996. Natasha Lyonne was also considered for the role but declined it due to not wanting to commit to a series at the age of 16. Other actresses who originally auditioned for the role of Buffy and got other roles in the show include Julie Benz (Darla), Elizabeth Anne Allen (Amy Madison), Julia Lee (Chantarelle/Lily Houston), Charisma Carpenter (Cordelia Chase) and Mercedes McNab (Harmony Kendall). Bianca Lawson, who played slayer Kendra Young in season 2 of the show, originally auditioned for the role of Cordelia before Carpenter was cast in the role.

The title role went to Sarah Michelle Gellar, who had appeared as Sydney Rutledge on Swans Crossing and Kendall Hart on All My Children. At age 18 in 1995, Gellar had already won a Daytime Emmy Award for Outstanding Younger Leading Actress in a Drama Series. In 1996, she originally auditioned for the role of Cordelia. After watching her audition, Whedon asked her to come back in and audition for the lead role of Buffy.

A talent agent spotted David Boreanaz on the sidewalk walking his dog. He immediately contacted casting director Marcia Shulman, saying that he had found Angel.

Anthony Stewart Head had already led a prolific acting and singing career but remained best known in the United States for a series of twelve coffee commercials with Sharon Maughan for Taster's Choice instant coffee. He accepted the role of Rupert Giles.

Nicholas Brendon, unlike other Buffy regulars, had little acting experience, instead working various jobs—including production assistant, plumber's assistant, veterinary janitor, food delivery, script delivery, day care counselor, and waiter—before breaking into acting and overcoming his stutter. He landed the role of Xander Harris following four days of auditioning. Ryan Reynolds was offered an undisclosed role, but declined due to his real-life experience in high school. Danny Strong also auditioned for the part, he later played the role of Jonathan Levinson, a recurring character for much of the series run.

Alyson Hannigan was the last of the original six to be cast. Following her role in My Stepmother Is an Alien, she appeared in commercials and supporting roles on television shows throughout the early 1990s. In 1996, the role of Willow Rosenberg was originally played by Riff Regan for the unaired Buffy pilot, but Hannigan auditioned when the role was being recast for the series proper. Hannigan described her approach to the character through Willow's reaction to a particular moment: Willow sadly tells Buffy that her Barbie doll was taken from her as a child. Buffy asks her if she ever got it back. Willow's line was to reply "most of it". Hannigan decided on an upbeat and happy delivery of the line "most of it", as opposed to a sad, depressed delivery. Hannigan figured Willow would be happy and proud that she got "most of it" back. That indicated how she was going to play the rest of the scene, and the role, for that matter, and defined the character. Her approach subsequently got her the role.

=== Opening sequence ===
The Buffy opening sequence provides credits at the beginning of each episode, with the accompanying music performed by Californian rock band Nerf Herder. In the DVD commentary for the first Buffy episode, Whedon said his decision to go with Nerf Herder's theme was influenced by Hannigan, who had urged him to listen to the band's music. Nerf Herder later recorded a second version of the theme which was used for the opening titles from season 3 on. Janet Halfyard, in her essay "Music, Gender, and Identity in Buffy the Vampire Slayer and Angel", describes the opening:

Firstly ... we have the sound of an organ, accompanied by a wolf's howl, with a visual image of a flickering night sky overlaid with unintelligible archaic script: the associations with both the silent era and films such as Nosferatu and with the conventions of the Hammer House of Horror and horror in general are unmistakable.

But the theme quickly changes: "It removes itself from the sphere of 1960s and 70s horror by replaying the same motif, the organ now supplanted by an aggressively strummed electric guitar, relocating itself in modern youth culture ..." Halfyard describes sequences, in which the action and turbulence of adolescence are depicted, as the visual content of the opening credits, and which provide a postmodern twist on the horror genre.

== Broadcast history and syndication ==
Buffy the Vampire Slayer first aired on March 10, 1997 (as a mid-season replacement for the series Savannah) on The WB, and played a key role in the growth of the Warner Bros. television network in its early years. After five seasons, it transferred to UPN for its final two seasons. In 2001, the show went into syndication in the United States on local stations and on cable channel FX; the local airings ended in 2005, and the FX airings lasted until 2008 but returned to the network in 2013. Beginning in January 2010, it began to air in syndication in the United States on Logo. Reruns also briefly aired on MTV. In March 2010, it began to air in Canada on MuchMusic and MuchMore. On November 7, 2010, it began airing on Chiller with a 24-hour marathon; the series airs weekdays. Chiller also aired a 14-hour Thanksgiving Day marathon on November 25, 2010. In 2011, it began airing on Oxygen and TeenNick. On June 22, 2015, it began airing on ABC Family.

While the seventh season was still being broadcast, Sarah Michelle Gellar told Entertainment Weekly she was not going to sign on for an eighth year; "When we started to have such a strong year this year, I thought: 'This is how I want to go out, on top, at our best.'" Whedon and UPN gave some considerations to production of a spin-off series that would not require Gellar, including a rumored Faith series, but nothing came of those plans. The Buffy canon continued outside the television medium in the Dark Horse Comics series, Buffy Season Eight. This was produced starting March 2007 by Whedon, who also wrote the first story arc, "The Long Way Home".

In the United Kingdom, the entire series aired on Sky One and BBC Two. After protests from fans about early episodes being edited for their pre-watershed time-slot, from the second run (mid-second season onwards), the BBC gave the show two time slots: the early-evening slot (typically Thursday at 6:45 pm) for a family-friendly version with violence, objectionable language and other stronger material cut out, and a late-night uncut version (initially late-night Sundays, but for most of the run, late-night Fridays; exact times varied). Sky1 aired the show typically at 8:00 pm on Thursdays. From the fourth season onwards, the BBC aired the show in anamorphic 16:9 widescreen format. Whedon later said that Buffy was never intended to be viewed this way. Despite his claims, Syfy now airs repeat showings in the widescreen format.

In August 2014, Pivot announced that, for the first time, episodes of Buffy would be broadcast in high-definition and in a widescreen 16:9 format authorized by the studio, but not by any of the series' principals. The transfer was poorly received by some fans, owing to a number of technical and format changes that were viewed as detrimental to the show's presentation; various scenes were heavily cropped to fit the 16:9 format, and shots were altered to have a brighter look, often with color levels altered. Other problems included missing filters, editing errors, and poorly re-rendered CGI. Series creator Joss Whedon and other members of the original team also expressed their displeasure.

The series became available on Disney+ (under the Star brand) beginning February 2021, and was added to Comet's digital network in 2022.

== Spin-offs ==
Buffy has inspired a range of official works, including television shows, books, comics, games, and podcasts. This expansion of the series encouraged use of the term "Buffyverse" to describe the franchise and the fictional universe in which Buffy and related stories take place.

The franchise has inspired Buffy action figures and merchandise such as official Buffy/Angel magazines and Buffy companion books. Eden Studios has published a Buffy role-playing game, while Score Entertainment has released a Buffy Collectible Card Game.

=== Comic books continuation ===
The story line was continued in a series of comic books produced by Joss Whedon and published by Dark Horse Comics, which serve as a canonical continuation of the television series. The series began in 2007 with Buffy the Vampire Slayer Season Eight and was followed by Buffy the Vampire Slayer Season Nine in 2011, Buffy the Vampire Slayer Season Ten in 2014, Buffy the Vampire Slayer Season Eleven in 2016, and Buffy the Vampire Slayer Season Twelve in 2018.

=== Angel ===
The spin-off Angel was introduced in October 1999, at the start of Buffy season four. The series was created by Buffy's creator Joss Whedon in collaboration with David Greenwalt. Like Buffy, it was produced by the production company Mutant Enemy. At times, it performed better in the Nielsen ratings than its parent series did.

The series was given a darker tone, focusing on the ongoing trials of Angel in Los Angeles. His character is tormented by guilt following the return of his soul, punishment for more than a century of murder and torture. During the first four seasons of the show, he works as a private detective in a fictionalized version of Los Angeles, California, where he and his associates work to "help the helpless", to restore the faith and "save the souls" of those who have lost their way. Typically, this mission involves doing battle with demons or demonically allied humans (primarily the law firm Wolfram & Hart), while Angel must also contend with his own violent nature. In season five, the Senior Partners of Wolfram and Hart take a bold gamble in their campaign to corrupt Angel, giving him control of their Los Angeles office. Angel accepts the deal as an opportunity to fight evil from the inside.

In addition to Boreanaz, Angel inherited Buffy series cast regular Charisma Carpenter (Cordelia Chase). When Glenn Quinn (Doyle) left the series during its first season, Alexis Denisof (Wesley Wyndam-Pryce), who played a recurring character in the last nine episodes of season three of Buffy, took his place. Carpenter and Denisof were followed later by Mercedes McNab (Harmony Kendall) and James Marsters (Spike). Several actors and actresses who played Buffy characters made guest appearances on Angel, including Seth Green (Daniel "Oz" Osbourne), Sarah Michelle Gellar (Buffy Summers), Eliza Dushku (Faith), Tom Lenk (Andrew Wells), Alyson Hannigan (Willow Rosenberg), Julie Benz (Darla), Mark Metcalf (The Master), Julia Lee (Anne Steele) and Juliet Landau (Drusilla). Angel also continued to appear occasionally on Buffy.

Other actors that appeared in both the Buffy the Vampire Slayer and Angel series but as different characters include: Bob Fimiani as Mr. Ward, a head of the Department of Defense in Buffy and Glith-roo, a Codger Demon in Angel; Carlos Jacott as a demon named Ken in Buffy and a different demon named Richard Straley in Angel; Jonathan M. Woodward as a vampire and former classmate in Buffy named Holden Webster and Knox, a Wolfram and Hart scientist in Angel; and Andy Umberger who played a demon named D'Hoffryn in Buffy and a predator named Ronald Meltzer in Angel.

The storyline has been continued in the comic book series Angel: After the Fall published by IDW Publishing and later Angel and Faith published by Dark Horse Comics.

=== Expanded universe ===
The series' fiction has been officially expanded and elaborated on by authors and artists in the so-called "Buffyverse Expanded Universe". The creators of these works may or may not keep to established continuity. Similarly, writers for the TV series were under no obligation to use information which had been established by the Expanded Universe, and sometimes contradicted such continuity.

Dark Horse has published the Buffy comics since 1998. In 2003, Whedon wrote an eight-issue miniseries for Dark Horse Comics titled Fray, about a Slayer in the future. Following the publication of Tales of the Vampires in 2004, Dark Horse Comics halted publication on Buffyverse-related comics and graphic novels. The company produced Whedon's Buffy the Vampire Slayer Season Eight with forty issues from March 2007 to January 2011, picking up where the television show left off—taking the place of an eighth canonical season. The first story arc is also written by Whedon and is called "The Long Way Home", which has been widely well-received, with circulation rivaling industry leaders DC and Marvel's top-selling titles. After "The Long Way Home" came other story arcs like Faith's return in "No Future for You" and a Fray crossover in "Time of Your Life". Dark Horse later followed Season Eight with Buffy the Vampire Slayer Season Nine, starting in 2011, and Buffy the Vampire Slayer Season Ten, which began in 2014. Dark Horse continued to publish Buffy comics continuing the story after the television show until September 2018, when it released the final issue of Buffy the Vampire Slayer Season Twelve, which intended to bring closure to the series. Following the end of Dark Horse's Buffy series, Boom! Studios acquired the license to publish Buffy comics. Taking a different approach from Dark Horse, Boom! Studios decided to publish a new rebooted Buffy series in 2019 with many elements updated to be more contemporary. Boom! Studio's approach to rebooting Buffy has been stylistically compared to the Ultimate Marvel series by the creators. Joss Whedon is not as involved in the rebooted Buffy comic as he was in Dark Horse's continuation, however he did take part in the initial development stages for the series and gave his blessing to the creators.

Simon & Schuster holds the license to produce Buffy novels, of which they published more than sixty between 1998 and 2008, under their Pocket Books and Simon Pulse imprints. These sometimes flesh out background information on characters; for example, Go Ask Malice details the events that lead up to Faith arriving in Sunnydale. The most recent novels include Carnival of Souls, Blackout, Portal Through Time, Bad Bargain, The Deathless and One Thing or Your Mother. Two additional novels were written by Kiersten White and published in 2019 and 2020: Slayer and Chosen.

Five official Buffy video games have been released on portable and home consoles. Most notably, Buffy the Vampire Slayer for Xbox in 2002 and Chaos Bleeds for GameCube, Xbox and PlayStation 2 in 2003.

In September 2023, an audio series titled Slayers: A Buffyverse Story was announced, to premiere on October 12, 2023, on Audible. The series is set 10 years after the events of the series finale and the story is led by Spike (James Marsters); also returning are Charisma Carpenter, Anthony Head, Juliet Landau, Emma Caulfield, Amber Benson, James C. Leary, and Danny Strong. The series was written by Benson and Christopher Golden, and directed by Benson, Golden, and Kc Wayland. In February 2024, Audible canceled the series after one season.

=== Undeveloped spinoffs ===
The popularity of Buffy and Angel has led to attempts to develop more on-screen ventures in the fictional 'Buffyverse'. These projects remain undeveloped and may never be greenlit. In 2002, two potential spinoffs were in discussion: Buffy: The Animated Series and Ripper. Buffy: The Animated Series was a proposed animated TV show based on Buffy; Whedon and Jeph Loeb were to be executive producers for the show, and most of the cast from Buffy were to return to voice their characters. 20th Century Fox showed an interest in developing and selling the show to another network. A three-minute pilot was completed in 2004 but was never picked up. Whedon revealed to The Hollywood Reporter: "We just could not find a home for it. We had six or seven hilarious scripts from our own staff–and nobody wanted it." Writer Jane Espenson has teased small extracts from some of her scripts for the show.

Ripper was originally a proposed television show based upon the character of Rupert Giles portrayed by Anthony Stewart Head. More recent information has suggested that if Ripper were ever made, it would be a TV movie or a DVD movie. There was little heard about the series until 2007 when Joss Whedon confirmed that talks were almost completed for a 90-minute Ripper special on the BBC with both Head and the BBC completely on board.

In 2003, a year after the first public discussions on Buffy: The Animated Series and Ripper, Buffy was nearing its end. Espenson said during the time spin-offs were being discussed, "I think Marti talked with Joss about Slayer School and Tim Minear talked with him about Faith on a motorcycle. I assume there was some back-and-forth pitching." Espenson has revealed that Slayer School might have used new slayers and potentially included Willow Rosenberg, but Whedon did not think that such a spinoff felt right.

Dushku declined the pitch for a Buffyverse TV series based on Faith and instead agreed to a deal to produce Tru Calling. Dushku explained to IGN: "It would have been a really hard thing to do, and not that I would not have been up for a challenge, but with it coming on immediately following Buffy, I think that those would have been really big boots to fill." Tim Minear explained some of the ideas behind the aborted series: "The show was basically going to be Faith meets Kung Fu. It would have been Faith, probably on a motorcycle, crossing the earth, trying to find her place in the world."

Finally, during the summer of 2004 after the end of Angel, a movie about Spike was proposed. The movie would have been directed by Tim Minear and starred Marsters and Amy Acker and featured Alyson Hannigan. Outside the 2006 Saturn Awards, Whedon announced that he had pitched the concept to various bodies but had yet to receive any feedback.

In September 2008, Sci-Fi Wire ran an interview with Sarah Michelle Gellar in which she said she would not rule out returning to her most iconic role: "Never say never", she said. "One of the reasons the original Buffy movie did not really work on the big screen–and people blamed Kristy, but that's not what it was–the story was better told over a long arc", Gellar said. "And I worry about Buffy as a 'beginning, middle and end' so quickly. ... You show me a script; you show me that it works, and you show me that [the] audience can accept that, [and] I'd probably be there. Those are what my hesitations are."

== Attempted revivals ==
Whedon was interested in a film continuation in 1998, but such a film never materialized.

In July 2018, 20th Century Fox Television reportedly began development on a television reboot of the series. Monica Owusu-Breen was to serve as showrunner and had been working on the script with Whedon, who was to be an executive producer. News of Whedon's involvement was seen as reassuring by fans, though the extent of his involvement was unclear; other executive producers reported to be involved included Gail Berman, Fran Kuzui, and Kaz Kuzui, all credited as executive producers for the original series. According to anonymous sources who spoke with The Hollywood Reporter and Deadline Hollywood, the producers wanted the new series to be "richly diverse ... [and] some aspects of the series could be seen as metaphors for issues facing society today"–similar to the way Gellar described the original series as the "ultimate metaphor" for coping with adolescence. The producers intended "for the new slayer to be African American", an example of the diversity they wish to portray. The report from Deadline Hollywood cautioned that "the project is still in nascent stages with no script, and many details are still in flux".

At the time of Buffy's 20th anniversary in 2017, Whedon expressed fear of reboots, commenting that when "something [is brought] back, and even if it's exactly as good as it was, the experience can't be. You've already experienced it, and part of what was great was going through it for the first time. You have to meet expectations and adjust it for the climate, which is not easily [done]." Similar concerns were expressed about the decision to reboot the series, rather than to revive it or further expand the Buffyverse. Reports that a black actress was to assume the iconic role of Buffy, rather than having a new character or Slayer created, have been met with questions and concerns. Vox noted that "the original series already had multiple characters of color who could factor into an 'inclusive' reboot–including the black slayer Kendra and the 'First Slayer'" – leaving fans wondering "why a reboot has to racebend Buffy, when it could simply focus on a different character". A Twitter message posted by Owusu-Breen on July 26, 2018, was interpreted by media outlets as indicating that the new series would not recast the role of Buffy and instead would focus on a new Slayer. In August 2022, executive producer Gail Berman announced that the series was put "on pause" indefinitely. In January 2024, Dolly Parton stated that the producers were still working on the reboot and were "revamping it."

In February 2025, Variety reported that a Buffy sequel series was nearing a pilot order at Hulu without Whedon's involvement. Gellar was set to reprise her role and serve as an executive producer alongside Gail Berman, Fran Kuzui, Kaz Kuzui, and Parton. Chloé Zhao was appointed as the pilot's director, with Nora and Lilla Zuckerman credited as the writers. The new series would feature a new Slayer as the primary protagonist, while Buffy Summers would appear in a recurring role. In May 2025, Ryan Kiera Armstrong was cast in the lead role. In July 2025, Faly Rakotohavana, Ava Jean, Sarah Bock, Daniel Di Tomasso and Jack Cutmore-Scott were announced as series regulars in the pilot. Filming for the pilot began in Los Angeles in August 2025 and additional cast members were announced, including Merrin Dungey, Audrey Hsieh, Audrey Grace Marshall and Chase Sui Wonders. On March 14, 2026, a day after telling ComicBook.com about her passion for the revival, Gellar announced that Hulu was no longer moving forward with it.

== Legacy and cultural impact ==
=== Academia ===
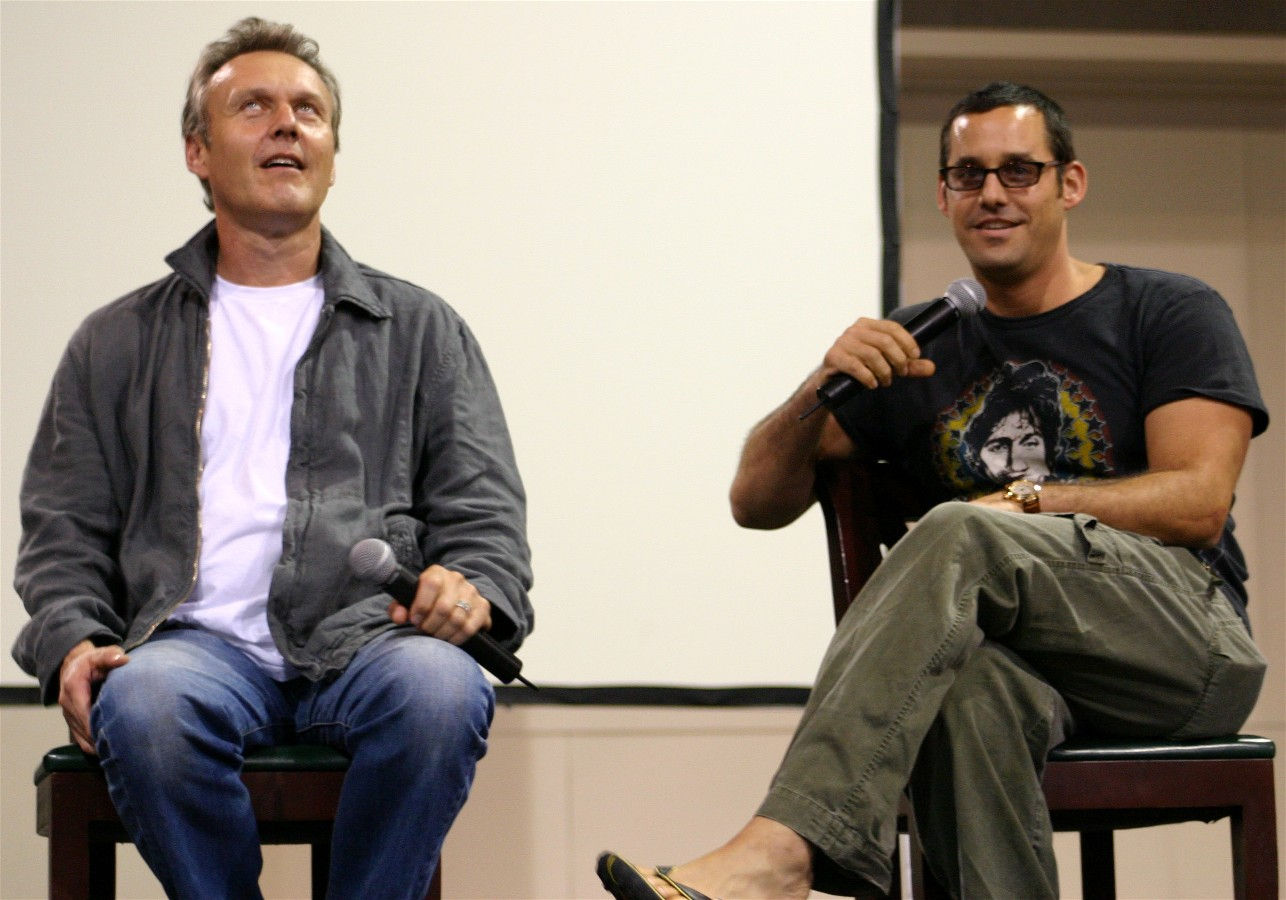
Anthony Stewart Head and Nicholas Brendon at the 2004 Oakland Super SlayerCon fan convention

Buffy is notable for attracting the interest of scholars of popular culture, as a subset of popular culture studies, and some academic settings include the show as a topic of literary study and analysis. National Public Radio describes Buffy as having a "special following among academics, some of whom have staked a claim in what they call 'Buffy Studies.'" Though not widely recognized as a distinct discipline, the term "Buffy studies" is commonly used amongst the peer-reviewed academic Buffy-related writings. The influence of Buffy on the depiction of vampires across popular culture has also been noted by anthropologists such as A. Asbjørn Jøn. Popular media researcher Rob Cover argued that Buffy and Angel speak to contemporary attitudes to identity, inclusion, and diversity, and that critiquing the characters' long-narrative stories lends insight into the complexity of identity in the current era and the landscape of social issues in which those identities are performed.

Critics have responded to the academic attention the series has received. For example, Jes Battis, who authored Blood Relations in Buffy and Angel, admits that study of the Buffyverse "invokes an uneasy combination of enthusiasm and ire", and meets "a certain amount of disdain from within the halls of the academy". Nonetheless, Buffy eventually led to the publication of around twenty books and hundreds of articles examining the themes of the show from a wide range of disciplinary perspectives, including sociology, Speech Communication, psychology, philosophy, and women's studies. In a 2012 study by Slate, Buffy the Vampire Slayer was named the most studied pop culture work by academics, with more than 200 papers, essays, and books devoted to the series.

The Whedon Studies Association produces the online academic journal Slayage and sponsors a biennial academic conference on the works of Whedon. The sixth "Biennial Slayage Conference", titled "Much Ado About Whedon", was held at California State University-Sacramento in late June 2014.

=== Fandom and fan films ===
The popularity of Buffy has led to the creation of websites, online discussion forums, works of Buffy fan fiction, and several unofficial fan-made productions. Since the end of the series, Whedon has stated that his intention was to produce a cult television series and has acknowledged the "rabid, almost insane fan base" that the show has created. In 2016, Jenny Owen Youngs and Kristin Russo began the Buffering the Vampire Slayer podcast, recognized as one of the top podcasts in production by Time and Esquire magazines. In 2017 the 20th anniversary of the show attracted even more writers to create their own adventures of the series' characters.

=== Buffy in popular culture ===
The series employed pop culture references as a frequent humorous device, and has itself become a frequent pop culture reference in video games, comics and television shows. The series has also been parodied and spoofed. Sarah Michelle Gellar has participated in several parody sketches, including a Saturday Night Live sketch in which the Slayer is relocated to the Seinfeld universe, and adding her voice to an episode of Robot Chicken that parodied a would-be eighth season of Buffy.

"Buffy" was the code-name used for an early HTC mobile phone which integrated the social networking website Facebook.

In March 2017, in honor of Buffy the Vampire Slayer's 20th anniversary, Entertainment Weekly reunited Joss Whedon and the whole cast for their first joint interview and photo shoot in over a decade.

=== U.S. television ratings ===
Viewership and ratings per season of Buffy the Vampire Slayer
Season	Timeslot (ET)	Network	Episodes	First aired		Last aired		TV season	Viewership rank	Avg. viewers (millions)
Season	Timeslot (ET)	Network	Episodes	Date	Viewers (millions)	Date	Viewers (millions)	TV season	Viewership rank	Avg. viewers (millions)
1	Monday 9:00 pm	The WB	12	March 10, 1997	4.59	June 2, 1997	3.97	1996–97	144	3.7
2	Monday 9:00 pm (1–13); Tuesday 8:00 pm (14–22)	The WB	22	September 15, 1997	4.37	May 19, 1998	6.37	1997–98	133	5.2
3	Tuesday 8:00 pm	The WB	22	September 29, 1998	7.06	September 21, 1999	5.08	1998–99	133	5.3
4	Tuesday 8:00 pm	The WB	22	October 5, 1999	6.79	May 23, 2000	4.50	1999–2000	120	5.1
5	Tuesday 8:00 pm	The WB	22	September 26, 2000	5.83	May 22, 2001	5.22	2000–01	120	4.6
6	Tuesday 8:00 pm	UPN	22	October 2, 2001	7.65	May 21, 2002	5.31	2001–02	124	4.3
7	Tuesday 8:00 pm	UPN	22	September 24, 2002	4.99	May 20, 2003	4.87	2002–03	140	3.9

Buffy helped put The WB on the ratings map, but by the time the series landed on UPN in 2001, viewing figures had fallen. The series' high came during the third season, with 5.3 million viewers (including repeats), possibly due to the fact that both Gellar and Hannigan had hit movies out during the season (Cruel Intentions and American Pie respectively). The series' low came in season one at 3.7 million. The series finale "Chosen" pulled in a season high of 4.9 million viewers on the UPN network.

The WB was impressed with the young audience the show was bringing in, and ordered a full season of 22 episodes for season two. Buffy was moved from Monday at 9:00 pm to launch The WB's new night of programming on Tuesday, starting with the episode "Innocence", watched by 8.2 million people. Due to its success in that time slot, it remained on Tuesdays at 8:00 pm for the remainder of its original run, and became one of the network's highest-rated shows.

In the 2001–2002 season, the show moved to UPN after a negotiation dispute with The WB. While it was still one of the highest rated shows on their network, The WB felt that it had peaked and thus declined a salary increase to the cast and crew. UPN then picked the series up for a two-season renewal, dedicating a two-hour premiere to help re-launch it. The following season premiere attracted the second highest rating of the series, with 7.7 million viewers.

=== Impact on television ===
Buffy the Vampire Slayer became a pop culture phenomenon and is considered to be iconic. Commentators of the entertainment industry including AllMovie, The Hollywood Reporter, PopMatters, The Village Voice, and The Washington Post cite Buffy as "influential", with some describing it as the ascent of television into its golden age. Stephanie Zacharek, in the Village Voice, wrote, "If we really are in a golden age of television, Buffy the Vampire Slayer was a harbinger." Robert Moore of PopMatters expressed similar sentiments, writing "TV was not art before Buffy, but it was afterwards", suggesting that it was responsible for re-popularizing long story arcs on primetime television. The show is often seen as one of the greatest shows of all-time and for being groundbreaking and influential for the landscape of television. David Simon, creator of The Wire, considered Buffy as "the best show in years". Stephen Daisley of The Spectator stated that Buffy was a "generation-defining TV hit", following this by saying that "Buffy was steeped in literary allusions and crackled with pop culture references and became the first TV series to attract serious scholarship." He also wrote, "Renowned professors wrestled with this high school set study of the human condition while linguists tried to pin down Buffy Speak, the distinctive and playful grammar which animated Whedon's dialogue. (Inventive, much?)".

Buffy the Vampire Slayer showed the whole world, and an entire sprawling industry, that writing monsters and demons and end-of-the world is not hack-work, it can challenge the best. Joss Whedon raised the bar for every writer—not just genre/niche writers, but every single one of us.

— Russell T Davies

Buffy's effect on programming was quickly evident. Autumn 2003 saw several new shows going into production in the U.S. that featured strong females forced to come to terms with supernatural power or destiny while trying to maintain a normal life. These post-Buffy shows include Dead Like Me, Joan of Arcadia, Tru Calling, Veronica Mars and Teen Wolf. Bryan Fuller, the creator of Dead Like Me, said that "Buffy showed that young women could be in situations that were both fantastic and relatable, and instead of shunting women off to the side, it puts them at the center." In the United Kingdom, the lessons learned from the impact of Buffy influenced the revived Doctor Who series (2005–present), as well as its spinoff series Torchwood. Reviewers noted that shows such as Legacies and Riverdale took inspiration from Buffy involving the "Dark Willow" story arc. Adam B. Vary of Variety, by talking about the potential reboot of the show, wrote how "Buffy presaged the next 25 years of genre-bending entertainment. Supernatural, True Blood, Alias, Once Upon a Time, The Vampire Diaries, Veronica Mars, Teen Wolf, The Magicians, Jessica Jones, Orphan Black, Chilling Adventures of Sabrina, Wynonna Earp, Riverdale, Wednesday, Game of Thrones — none of these shows, and many more besides, would be what they are without Buffy."

Several Buffy alumni have gone on to write for or create other shows. Such endeavors include Tru Calling (Douglas Petrie, Jane Espenson and lead actress Eliza Dushku), Wonderfalls (Tim Minear), Point Pleasant (Marti Noxon), Jake 2.0 (David Greenwalt), The Inside (Tim Minear), Smallville (Steven S. DeKnight), Once Upon a Time (Jane Espenson), Lost (Drew Goddard and David Fury), and Daredevil (Goddard, DeKnight, and Petrie). TV Tropes, a website devoted to pop culture tropes, claimed that Buffy the Vampire Slayer is the reason why the site exists. The show also had a significant impact on slang in popular culture. The series also served as inspiration for television writers such as Shonda Rhimes, Eric Kripke, Rob Thomas and Amy Sherman-Palladino. In 2015, The Atlantic wrote that Buffy is "still revolutionary" and "subversive". The Daily Orange wrote "Buffy led the third-wave feminist movement in pop culture", talking about how the series led the cause for women leads on TV.

Several critics have noted series such as Orphan Black, The Magicians, Jessica Jones and Wynonna Earp as being worthy successors to Buffy. At the 2015 San Diego Comic-Con, the authors Rachel Hawkins, Kiersten White, Rae Carson, Brittany Geragotelis and Valerie Tejeda talked about the Buffy effect on heroines in fiction and how Buffy was a big influence on writing their books.

Meanwhile, the Parents Television Council complained of efforts to "deluge their young viewing audiences with adult themes". The U.S. Federal Communications Commission (FCC), however, rejected the council's indecency complaint concerning the violent sex scene between Buffy and Spike in "Smashed". The BBC, however, chose to censor some of the more controversial sexual content when it was shown on the pre-watershed 6:45 pm slot.

Show characters Willow Rosenberg and Tara Maclay were one of the first lesbian couples to be shown on public broadcast television. This was important representation at the time, as it challenged many social stereotypes about gay women. It did not over-sexualize them and instead allowed them to be seen as independent people in a fairly healthy relationship. Creator Joss Whedon has said in interviews that he was initially told by the network he could not include a bisexual character in the show, however, in later seasons as cultural opinions on LGBT issues began to shift, he was allowed to introduce Willow and Tara as being in a relationship with one another. At first they were only seen talking and holding hands as they were not allowed to be shown kissing, until in 2002, the show showed the girlfriends in bed together, which though not a sex scene was considered the first scene of its kind for a broadcast network series. The following year, the show featured the first lesbian sex scene in broadcast TV history.

=== Awards and nominations ===
Buffy has gathered a number of awards and nominations which include an Emmy Award nomination for the 1999 episode "Hush", which featured an extended sequence with no character dialogue. The 2001 episode "The Body" was filmed with no musical score, only diegetic music; it was nominated for a Nebula Award in 2002. The 2001 musical episode "Once More, with Feeling" received plaudits, but was omitted from Emmy nomination ballots by "accident". It since was featured on Channel 4's "100 Greatest Musicals". In 2001, Sarah Michelle Gellar received a Golden Globe-nomination for Best Actress in a TV Series-Drama for her role in the show, as well nominations for the Teen Choice Awards and the Saturn Award for Best Genre TV Actress. The series won the Drama Category for Television's Most Memorable Moment at the 60th Primetime Emmy Awards for "The Gift" beating The X-Files, Grey's Anatomy, Brian's Song and Dallas, although the sequence for this award was not aired.

It was nominated for Emmy and Golden Globe awards, winning a total of three Emmys. However, snubs in lead Emmy categories resulted in outrage among TV critics and the decision by the academy to hold a tribute event in honor of the series after it had gone off the air in 2003.

=== "Best of" lists ===
- Ranked #2 on Empire's "50 Greatest TV Shows of All Time"
- Ranked #2 on Entertainment Weekly's "50 Best Teen Shows of All Time"
- Voted #3 in 2004 and 2007 on TV Guide's "Top Cult Shows Ever"
- Named the third Best School Show of All Time by AOL TV
- Ranked #7 on TV Guide's list of "The 60 Greatest Sci-Fi Shows of All Time"
- 27th on The Hollywood Reporter's "Hollywood's 100 Favorite TV Shows"
- Ranked #38 in 2016 on Rolling Stone's list of 100 Greatest TV Shows of All Time
- Ranked #38 in TV Guide's list of the "60 Best Series of All Time"
- Ranked #40 in Screen Rant's "The 50 Best TV Shows Of All Time, Ranked"
- Ranked #40 in Variety's "100 Greatest TV Shows of All Time"
- Ranked #41 on TV Guide's list of 50 Greatest TV Shows of All Time
- Ranked #49 by Writers Guild of America on their list of the "101 Best Written TV Series Of All Time"
- Listed in Time magazine's "100 Best TV Shows of All-Time"
- Included in TV Guide's 2013 list of "The 60 Greatest Dramas of All Time"
- Included on Syfy's list of "The 25 best fantasy series of the past 25 years"

== Home media ==
By 2004, before the release of the final season, the series earned $123.3 million in sales.

DVD	Release date		
DVD	United States/Canada	United Kingdom	Australia
The Complete First Season	January 15, 2002	November 27, 2000	November 20, 2000
The Complete Second Season	June 11, 2002	May 21, 2001	June 15, 2001
The Complete Third Season	January 7, 2003	October 29, 2001	November 22, 2001
The Complete Fourth Season	June 10, 2003	May 13, 2002	May 20, 2002
The Complete Fifth Season	December 9, 2003	October 28, 2002	November 29, 2002
The Complete Sixth Season	May 25, 2004	May 12, 2003	April 20, 2003
The Complete Seventh Season	November 16, 2004	April 5, 2004	May 15, 2004
The Chosen Collection (Seasons 1–7)	November 15, 2005	–	–
The Complete DVD Collection (Seasons 1–7)	–	October 30, 2005	November 23, 2005

== See also ==
- Vampire film
- List of vampire television series
- Superhero
