= List of fictional towns in television =

This is a list of fictional towns, villages, and cities from live-action television shows. This list should include only well-referenced, notable examples of fictional settlements that are integral to a work of fiction and substantively depicted therein. Fictionalized versions of actual towns (such as Raytown, Missouri in Mama's Family and Wellsville, New York in The Adventures of Pete & Pete) are not included.

For a list of fictional towns, villages and cities from animated television shows, see list of fictional towns in animation.

Town Name	Origin	Network	Notes
Águas de São Jacinto, Minas Gerais	Amor Perfeito	TV Globo	Fictional city located in Minas Gerais.
Akebono City, Japan	Madan Senki Ryukendo	TV Aichi	Located near or in Tokyo, Japan, Akebono City is a fictional special ward in Tokyo, Japan. This is where the SHOT (Shoot Hell Obduracy Troopers) headquarters is located. Appears to be a mixture of Shibamata with Yanaka, due to its ancient architecture and to be considered an old city.
Albuquerque, São Paulo	Estúpido Cupido	TV Globo	Fictional city located in São Paulo.
Algonquin Bay, Ontario	Cardinal	CTV	Algonquin Bay is a small town in Northern Ontario, a fictionalized version of the city of North Bay.
Allende del Sol, Mexico	Criminal Minds	CBS	The FBI's Behavioral Analysis Unit (or BAU) is sent to Allende del Sol, a small town full of traditions located in Mexico to hunt down a serial killer and rapist who is terrorizing this small Mexican town in the episode "Machismo" (1x19). The total population of Allende del Sol, Mexico is 20,000.
Antares, Rio Grande do Sul	Incidente em Antares	TV Globo	Fictional city, located in Rio Grande do Sul.
Agrestic, California	Weeds	Showtime	A fictional suburb of Los Angeles.
Angel Grove	Power Rangers	Various	City of Power Rangers.
Angelus, Western Australia	Lockie Leonard	NN	Angelus is a fictional coastal town in Western Australia the Leonard family move to. Is a regular setting used in novels, stories, and novellas by Tim Winton.
Araruna, São Paulo	Sinhá Moça	TV Globo	Araruna is a fictional countryside town where the Monarquists and Republicans defront yourselves.
Arlen, Texas	King of the Hill	FOX	
Armação dos Anjos, Rio de Janeiro	Vamp	TV Globo	Fictional city located on the coast of the state of Rio de Janeiro.
Armação do Sul, Santa Catarina	The Incredible '90s	TV Globo	Fictional city, located in Santa Catarina.
Aspern Tallow, England	Midsomer Murders	ITV	Aspern Tallow is a fictional village in Midsomer County.
August, United Kingdom	Late nights with Poe and Munro	Steam	August is a fictional English town
Babylon, Texas	Carnivàle	HBO	Located in Texas, it is the main scenario of the episodes "Black Blizzard" and "Babylon" of Season 1 of Carnivàle.
Badger's Drift, England	Midsomer Murders	ITV	Badger's Drift is a fictional village in Midsomer County.
Balatonmeggyes	Doktor Balaton	TV2	A village on the northern coast of the lake Balaton. It is famous for its medicinal water.
Banshee, Pennsylvania	Banshee	HBO	
Bay City	Another World	NBC	Generic midwestern town, location initially unidentified but inferred in the 1980s to be Illinois. Shares the name of a real town Bay City in Michigan.
Bay City, California	Starsky & Hutch	ABC	
Beacon Hills, California	Teen Wolf	MTV	Beacon Hills is the fictional town in which that main character Scott McCall is turned into a werewolf it is the central hub of the television show.
Bluebell, Alabama	Hart of Dixie	The CW	Bluebell, Alabama, is a Gulf Coast fictional town in the television series Hart of Dixie. The show's main character, Zoe Hart, a New York heart surgeon, moves to the small Southern town to become a general practitioner. All the episodes of Hart of Dixie take place almost entirely in Bluebell.
Boiadeiros, São Paulo	América	TV Globo	Fictional town, located in São Paulo
Bom Jesus das Almas and Vargem da Cruz, Goiás	Memorial de Maria Moura	TV Globo	Fictional city, located in Goiás.
Bom Jesus do Rio Claro, Paraná	O Astro	TV Globo	Fictional city, located in Paraná.
Buckhorn, South Dakota	Twin Peaks (Season 3)	Showtime	Buckhorn, South Dakota, is a small town. Once, a gory murder of a local librarian happens there, and a local school principal is arrested, after his fingerprints are found on the murder scene.
Bune, Texas	Criminal Minds (season 3)	CBS	A small town that is the setting for "Elephant's Memory", a case following a troubled teen on a murderous rampage.
Cabot Cove, Maine	Murder, She Wrote	CBS	Cabot Cove, Maine, is the small, fictional fishing village in which Jessica Fletcher lives in the television series Murder, She Wrote. Many episodes of Murder, She Wrote used Cabot Cove as a location because the show's producers were contractually obliged to deliver five Cabot Cove episodes a year. Despite the town's population of 3,560, Cabot Cove became notable as a place where a large number of murders took place. The New York Times calculated that almost 2% of Cabot Cove's residents died during the show's run. More visitors to Cabot Cove died than residents. Cabot Cove is named after the town's founder, Winfred Cabot. Perhaps setting the stage for the town's reputation for murders, Cabot was killed in a murder-suicide situation with his wife Hepzibah. It has an architectural heritage of Victorian houses. Given the village's rich history, coastal location and close proximity to eastern U.S. cities, Cabot Cove was transformed from a small, sleepy fishing village to a tourist destination for the people coming from New York.
Camden County	My Name is Earl	NBC	A rural town where the title character Earl Hickey wins $100,000 on a lottery scratcher, only to be hit by a truck. He dedicates his life to helping others that he has wronged.
Campo Claro, Rio de Janeiro	Total Dreamer	TV Globo	Fictional city, located in Rio de Janeiro.
Capeside, Massachusetts	Dawson's Creek	The WB	Capeside is a fictional town in Massachusetts where Dawson's Creek takes place. It is located on Cape Cod, possibly somewhere mid-Cape between Falmouth and Yarmouth, as an early episodes includes these real towns in a "snow day" announcement. Incorporated in 1815, the town has a population of 35,000 and is located between the cities of Providence, Rhode Island and Boston, Massachusetts. Capeside exteriors were shot in and around Wilmington, North Carolina. Its bays and coastlines are similar to those found along the coast of Massachusetts.
Caramirim, Rio de Janeiro	Três Irmãs	TV Globo	Fictional city, located in Rio de Janeiro.
Causton, England	Midsomer Murders	ITV	Causton is the biggest town and the county seat of fictional Midsomer County.
Central City (DC Comics)	The Flash (2014 TV series)	The CW	Central City is the home to the titular character Barry Allen (Arrowverse).
Changadan	Dead Lake	Premier	Changadan is a uranium-mining town in the far north of Russia, where a detective from Moscow is investigating the death of the daughter of a local oligarch.
Charming, California	Sons of Anarchy	FX	Charming is the fictional Northern California town that serves as the main setting for FX's Sons of Anarchy. The town is located in the San Joaquin Valley, bounded by the Bay Area, Stockton, and Sacramento.
Chatswin, New York	Suburgatory	ABC	Located next to New York City, Chatswin is a suburban city that is infamously known to its residents for having the same physical phenotype: everyone there is stereotypically blond, with a suburban voice.
Chester's Mill, Maine	Under the Dome (TV series)	CBS	A fictional town, where the dome traps the entire town and its residents from the outside world.
Cicely, Alaska	Northern Exposure	CBS	A small, isolated town in Alaska where the main character, Joel Fleischman, is sent to work off his medical school debt as the town's physician. The ensemble cast forms a tight-knit community of eccentrics. Cicely is also multicultural, with Native American residents and culture playing a significant role. The series was filmed on location in Roslyn, Washington, with real buildings (such as the Brick tavern) utilized as primary sets and local Roslyn residents cast as extras.
Clinton Corners, Georgia	Carter Country	ABC	Clinton Corners is a fictional town in Georgia, presumably near the part of the state from which U.S. President Jimmy Carter hailed.
Collinsport, Maine	Dark Shadows	ABC	Collinsport is a fictional town in Maine on Frenchman's Bay and the location of Collinwood, the home of Barnabas Collins and the Collins Family. Its main industry is the local Collins Fishing and Cannery business.
Coroado, Goiás	Irmãos Coragem	TV Globo	Fictional city, located in Goiás.
Creed, Oklahoma	Carnivàle	HBO	Located in Oklahoma, this city is the birthplace of Evander Geddes, the man who made Henry Scudder's (the main protagonist's father) death mask.
Crinkley Bottom	Noel's House Party	BBC	Crinkley Bottom is a fictional village where Noel Edmonds lives in The Great House where the program is set.
Denton, England	A Touch of Frost	ITV	A fictional southern England town which is maybe in Berkshire, Oxfordshire or Wiltshire.
Dog River	Corner Gas	CTV	A small town in Saskatchewan Canada where the CTV series Corner Gas is filmed and the show takes place. It is not specified where, exactly, it is located in Saskatchewan but it is implied to be near Regina, Saskatchewan.
Dumpwater, Florida	Married... with Children	ELP Communications and Columbia Pictures Television and Tandem Productions	Dumpwater is a town located near Lake City in the 2 part episode Poppy's by the Tree.
Edgewater, California	Fire Country	CBS	Edgewater is a town located in California's redwood forests, with a conventional Cal Fire station (Station 42) and two CDCR conservation camps known as Three Rock (for men) and Black Creek (for women). It is based on series co-creator Max Thieriot's own hometown of Occidental, California.
Eerie, Indiana	Eerie, Indiana; Eerie, Indiana: The Other Dimension	NBC, Fox Kids	Eerie is a strange, desolate, little town in Indiana in the Eerie, Indiana and Eerie, Indiana: The Other Dimension television shows. The town is known for being quite weird, especially to the main characters of both series.
Emmerdale	Emmerdale	ITV	Originally known as Beckindale until 1994, Emmerdale, is a fictional village in the Yorkshire Dales created by Kevin Laffan for the long-running British soap opera of the same name.
Erinsborough, Melbourne	Neighbours	Seven Network	Erinsborough is a fictional suburb in Melbourne.
Eureka, Oregon	Eureka	Sci-Fi Channel	A fictional town of Eureka, Southern Oregon.
Everwood, Colorado	Everwood	The WB	Everwood, Colorado is a fictional small town that forms the main setting for the American drama television series of the same name. It was filmed in Ogden, South Salt Lake, and Draper, Utah, except the series pilot which was filmed in Canmore, Alberta, Denver, Colorado and Calgary.
Exclamation, USA	Clone High	MTV	Exclamation, USA is the fictional town in which the Clone High series takes place. It is the home of the high school that the clones go to.
Fairview	Desperate Housewives	ABC	Located somewhere in the US, Fairview is a small town that is the main setting for Desperate Housewives. It is implied that Fairview is located in the Midwest.
Fuji-Asada, Japan	Hot Spot	NTV	Tourist location with picturesque views over the lake and Mt. Fuji; this fictional town is located at the foot of Mt. Fuji in Yamanashi Prefecture. The famous street of shops with Mt. Fuji is Shimoyoshida 3 in Fujiyoshida.
Futo, Japan	Kamen Rider W	TV Asahi	Located near Tokyo, this city is the main setting of Kamen Rider W and is known for being an ecologically friendly city, whose energy comes from windmills and which have become the city's trademark.
Genoa City, Wisconsin	The Young and the Restless	CBS	Genoa City is a northern city in Wisconsin in the United States. It is the setting of the CBS television daytime soap opera The Young and the Restless.
Gotham City	Gotham	FOX	A reimagining of the Batman mythology.
Gravity Falls, Oregon	Gravity Falls	Disney Channel	A fictional town created for an animated series set in the Pacific Northwest.
Grimsburg	Grimsburg	FOX	
Happiness, Arizona	The Twilight Zone	CBS	A small town in Arizona.
Harmony	Passions	NBC	A small New England town. Set in the television daytime fantasy soap opera Passions.
Hawkins, Indiana	Stranger Things	Netflix	Hawkins is a fictional town in Stranger Things. The Duffer Brothers originally wanted to call the series Montauk, after Montauk, New York, and set it on Long Island, but filming locations around Atlanta, Georgia could not pass for a beachside setting, so they went with Indiana instead.
Hohman, Indiana	A Christmas Story	MGM	Hohman is a fictional city from A Christmas Story. The name is derived from Hohman Avenue, a major street in downtown Hammond, Indiana.
Holby	Casualty, Holby City, HolbyBlue	BBC	A fictional city in the United Kingdom, in which BBC medical dramas Casualty and Holby City, and police drama HolbyBlue are set. It is based upon the city of Bristol and is located in the fictional county of Wyvern in the South-West of England, not far from the Welsh border. Both Casualty and Holby City are set in the same fictional Holby City Hospital, with storylines focusing on the Emergency, Clinical Decisions Unit (CDU), Private Healthcare Unit (HolbyCare), General (Kellar) and Cardiothoracic surgical (Darwin) departments, an Acute Assessment Unit (AAU) and the fictional Holby Ambulance Service.
Hollyoaks	Hollyoaks	Channel 4	A fictional village based in the city of Chester in the United Kingdom, which provides the setting for the long running Channel 4 soap opera Hollyoaks.
Hummingbird Alley	Allegra's Window	Nick Jr.	The main location of the series, where Allegra attends Little Blue Daycare there.
Jarden, Texas	The Leftovers	HBO	A Texan town located in the Miracle National Park, from which no one departed during the Sudden Departure.
Jericho, Kansas	Jericho	CBS	Jericho is set in northwestern Kansas, but the series was filmed in Van Nuys, California. The pilot and all episodes involving New Bern, Kansas, were filmed in Fillmore, California. Filming also occurred in Pasadena, California, including in front of the city hall. The final episode to air included portions filmed at the Santa Anita race track. Some filming also took place in Canada. The commentary for some episodes on the Jericho Season 1 DVD includes the location of their filming.
Juniper Creek, Utah	Big Love	HBO	A compound of Mormon fundamentalists about a 3-hour drive from Salt Lake City where the main character Bill Hendrickson grew up and founded by his grandfather after the LDS Church officially went against polygamy in 1890. The nearest town to Juniper Creek is Meeker, Utah, the county seat of Meeker County, Utah. Inspired by the real Mormon fundamentalist community of Short Creek on the border of Utah and Arizona.
Kaldor City	Doctor Who's The Robots of Death	BBC	A major human city of the future on a corrupt world governed by an all-powerful Company, where the rich scheme in mansions filled with robot slaves, the poor scrabble for survival in the Sewerpits, the Security forces are out of control and terrorism is a daily fact of life". The city was first mentioned in The Robots of Death as the home base of a "storm mine" touring the desert searching for and mining precious minerals from within the sands, with the crew working on a commission for the company. It was created by Chris Boucher for the Doctor Who serial The Robots of Death broadcast in 1977, and was reused in his Past Doctor Adventure Corpse Marker in 1999. It is also the setting and title of a series of audio plays produced by Magic Bullet Productions.
Kembleford, Cotswolds	Father Brown	BBC One	
Khrustalnyy	Khrustalnyy	Kion	
Kier, PE	Severance	Apple TV+	A fictitious company town owned by Kier Eagan and a main setting where Lumon Industries is located. The acronym for the state's name is currently unknown.
Kitaizu, Japan	Tokyo Tarareba Girls	NTV	Hayasaka's hometown in episode seven. There appears to be a view of Mt. Fuji in the background.
Lapataganj	Lapataganj	SAB TV	A town in some part of India which has been long forgotten by the system. The town struggles daily for basic facilities, yet the people residing there are the happiest of the lot.
Letherbridge	Doctors	BBC One	A town in the West Midlands nearby to Birmingham. The set is located at the BBC Drama Village and is a host to fictional locations including the Mill Health Centre, a university doctor's surgery, a police station and a restaurant, the Icon.
Little Dimpton	The Benny Hill Show	Thames Television	Little Dimpton is the fictional English town and setting where many of the incidents and events of "The Benny Hill Show" take place, particularly in the later half of the series.
Little Stempington, England	Suburban Shootout	Channel 5	
Llanview, Pennsylvania	One Life to Live	ABC	Llanview, Pennsylvania is the fictional setting of the ABC Daytime soap opera One Life to Live.
Lower Uncton, England	Married... with Children	ELP Communications and Columbia Pictures Television and Tandem Productions	Lower Unton is an English village in the 3 part episode England Show.
Lucifer, New Mexico	Married... with Children	ELP Communications and Columbia Pictures Television and Tandem Productions	Lucifer is a town in the 2 part episode Route:666.
Makkosszállás, Hungary	Keresztanyu	RTL Klub	A small town at the Hungarian-Ukrainian border. The local police's huge problem is the drug smuggling between Makkosszállás and Vologda.
Malodementyevsk	The Method	Channel One Russia	A Russian town where detectives arrive to investigate the murders of a vigilante known as "Saturday Cleaner".
Manscheid / Mënscht	Capitani	RTL, Netflix	A fictional village in the north of Luxembourg. A 15-year-old girl, Jenny Engel, gets murdered there, and police inspector Luc Capitani is investigating her death and the disappearance of her twin sister Tanja.
Marsh Wood, England	Midsomer Murders	ITV	Marsh Wood is a fictional village in Midsomer County.
Martyr Warren, England	Midsomer Murders	ITV	Martyr Warren is a fictional village in Midsomer County.
Medford, Texas	Young Sheldon	CBS	Fictional town in 2017 TV series Young Sheldon of settings 1989 and 1990.
Mega City	Massive Monster Mayhem	Family Channel	Master Mayhem and his monsters of space who try conquest the city on the earth. Costumed giant robot characters fight each other in a model set of the city.
Mayberry, North Carolina	The Andy Griffith Show	CBS	Mayberry is a fictional community in North Carolina that was the setting for two American television sitcoms, The Andy Griffith Show and Mayberry R.F.D. Mayberry was also the setting for a 1986 reunion television movie titled Return to Mayberry. It is said to be based on Andy Griffith's hometown, Mount Airy, North Carolina.
Melonville	SCTV	Various	Melonville is a small Canadian prairie town that serves as the city of license for SCTV, the TV station at the center of the TV series of the same name, and the center of said series' fictional universe.
Mercy, Saskatchewan	Little Mosque on the Prairie	CBC_Television	Mercy is a small city in Saskatchewan, serving as the backdrop of the TV series Little Mosque on the Prairie.
Midsomer Deverell, England	Midsomer Murders	ITV	Midsomer Deverell is a village in Midsomar County.
Midsomer Mallow, England	Midsomer Murders	ITV	Midsomer Mallow is a village in Midsomar County.
Midsomer Malham, England	Midsomer Murders	ITV	Midsomer Malham is a village in Midsomar County.
Midsomer Parva, England	Midsomer Murders	ITV	Midsomer Parva is a village in Midsomar County.
Midsomer Wellow, England	Midsomer Murders	ITV	Midsomer Wellow is a village in Midsomar County.
Midsomer Worthy, England	Midsomer Murders	ITV	Midsomer Worthy is a village in Midsomar County.
Mount Pleasant, Eagle State	Desperate Housewives	ABC	Located in fictional Eagle State, near Fairview.
Morton Fendle, England	Midsomer Murders	ITV	Morton Fendle is a village in Midsomer County.
Mystic Falls, Virginia	The Vampire Diaries	The CW	Mystic Falls is a small town in Virginia. It is home to numerous supernatural creatures.
National City	Supergirl (TV series)	The CW	National City is a fictional city that appears in Supergirl (TV series) and is the home to Superman's cousin and the titular character Supergirl (Kara Zor-El).
Neptune, California	Veronica Mars	UPN	Neptune, California is the series' fictional setting, a US unincorporated town in Balboa County. The town is described as without a middle class, and the upper class is known as "09ers", wealthy citizens from the fictional 90909 ZIP code. The nearby towns, at some distance from the beaches, do not have the same extremes between rich and poor.
North Mammon, Pennsylvania	Criminal Minds (season 2)	CBS	A small town that is the hometown of FBI agent Jennifer Jareau, the team comes here when someone kidnaps three local teenage girls and locks them in a cellar.
Nueva Esperanza	Darna	ABS-CBN	
New Canaan, California	Carnivàle	HBO	Located in California, it is the setting for the last episode of Carnivàle (2x12 - New Canaan, CA) and the location of the final confrontation between the protagonist, Ben Hawkins and the main villain of the series, Brother Justin Crowe.
Newton Magna, England	Midsomer Murders	ITV	Newton Magna is a village in Midsomer County.
Oakdale	As the World Turns	CBS	Fictional town used as primary setting throughout the history of As the World Turns, appears in the names of two DVD releases: "Christmas in Oakdale" (2011) and "Farewell to Oakdale" (the final 10 episodes of the series).
Orson, Indiana	The Middle	ABC	Orson is a small suburban town located in Indiana, approximately twenty-five miles southwest of Indianapolis. It is the 200th safest town in the state and is home to the world's largest polyurithane cow.
Pajkaszeg, Hungary	A Mi Kis Falunk	RTL Klub	A small village in Hungary, nearby Esztergom. It has a small fishing lake, but it is -not officially- the property of the Mayor, Károly Füleki.
Paradise, California	Bunheads	ABC	Featured on the television show Bunheads, Paradise is a fictional sleepy coastal town located thirty miles south of Ojai, California. It is depicted as a close-knit small town with many quirky characters.
Paradise Trailer Park, Georgia	Married... with Children	Fox Broadcasting Company	A trailer park in the episode Magnificent Seven
Pawnee, Indiana	Parks and Recreation	NBC	A city located in South Central Indiana, known for being the fourth fattest city in America. It was founded in May, 1817, by Rev. Luther Howell, who drove the native Indians off the land.
Pine Valley, Pennsylvania	All My Children	ABC	Pine Valley, Pennsylvania is the fictional setting of the ABC Daytime soap opera All My Children.
Point Place, Wisconsin	That '70s Show	FOX	Point Place, Wisconsin is the fictional suburb where That '70s Show takes place.
Port Charles, New York	General Hospital, Port Charles	ABC	Port Charles, New York is the fictional setting of the ABC Daytime soap operas General Hospital and its spin-offs Port Charles and General Hospital: Night Shift. It was later retroactively revealed as the setting of The Young Marrieds, a short-lived series which ran between 1964 and 1966.
Port Niranda, Victoria	Round the Twist	ABC; SN	Port Niranda is a fictional town in Victoria the Twist family move to that serves as the setting for Round the Twist.
Puerto del Santos, Mexico	Criminal Minds: Beyond Borders	CBS	A popular tourist destination in Mexico, this Mexican coastal city is the main setting for the episode "De Los Inocentes" (1x03).
Quahog, Rhode Island	Family Guy	FOX	
Rosehaven, Tasmania	Rosehaven	ABC	A town located in Tasmania that is also the hometown of Daniel McCallum where he returns to help his mother run the real estate business alongside his friend Emma who turns up after her honeymoon doesn't work out.
Rosewood, Pennsylvania	Pretty Little Liars	ABC	A wealthy, gossip-fueled suburb of Philadelphia that is host to Rosewood High School.
Royston Vasey	The League of Gentlemen	BBC Two	Location for the dark comedy in the English Pennines. A sign on an approach road ominously declares "Welcome to Royston Vasey. You'll never leave!"
Salem, Illinois	Days of Our Lives	NBC; Peacock (streaming service)	Salem, Illinois is the location of the Daytime Soap Opera Days of Our Lives.
San Andreo, California	The West Wing	NBC	A town in California that appears in the episode Duck and Cover.
Sandicot, New York	Billions	Showtime	Small upstate New York town, the location for a proposed casino that Bobby Axelrod visits in an effort to persuade a landowner to accept a deal.
Santo Padre	Mayans M.C.	FX	A Southern border town California border town and home to the Mayans Motorcycle club.
Sariola	Lapsi		A village located on an eponymous island in Karelia, Russia. The nature of the island doesn't let its residents get diseases, but no more than 46 residents must reside in the village.
Schwanitz	Nord bei Nordwest	ARD	
Smallville, Kansas	Smallville	The WB	A reimagining of the Superman comic books, focusing on his youth as Clark Kent growing up in a small farming town in Kansas.
Soldadera, Mexico	S.W.A.T. (2017 TV series, season 5)	CBS	A town in the Mexican countryside that appears in the first two episodes of season 5 that is effectively run by an international fugitive who has taken refuge here. Looking to escape his own problems back home, Hondo gets involved in the town's politics when he tries to help out a local family who has been steadfast in refusing to sell their farm to the fugitive. The show does not specify where in Mexico the town is located, but the episodes in question were filmed in the Mexican state of Morelos.
Sôvä nad Sŕním	Torchwood	BBC	Sôvä nad Sŕním, Slovakia, designates a village in the Torchwood universe, the base of Slovak Torchwood branch.
Springfield	Guiding Light	CBS	Springfield identifies fictional towns in various TV series, as many real US cities in diverse states (including Massachusetts, Missouri and Illinois) share this common name.
Springfield	The Simpsons	FOX	
Stafford, Indiana	The Fugitive	ABC	Stafford, Indiana is the fictional Indiana town on the 1963-67 television show The Fugitive where Dr. Richard Kimble was arrested (and later convicted) for the murder of his wife.
Stars Hollow, Connecticut	Gilmore Girls	The WB	Stars Hollow is a fictional small town in Connecticut featured on the television show Gilmore Girls. It is depicted as a close-knit small town with many quirky characters, located roughly thirty minutes by car from Hartford. It is loosely based on the towns of Essex, Wallingford, and Washington, Connecticut, but filming of the pilot was done in historical Main Street Unionville in Unionville, Ontario.
St-Jean-De-Bosco	Rock et Belles Oreilles	V TV network (Quebec)	St-Jean-De-Bosco is a fictional small town in Quebec featured on the television show Rock et Belles Oreilles. It is never seen, but in several sketches some notable characters in the show are stated to be from there, including the glam metal band "Suppositories de Satan (Suppositories of Satan)" and the winners of the international francophone University Challenge game show (who hailed from its reform school).
Star City, California	Malcolm in the Middle	FOX	Star City is a fictional town in California on the television sitcom Malcolm in the Middle.
Star City (Comics)	Arrow (TV series)	The CW	Star City, formerly Starling City, is a fictional city appearing in Arrow (TV series) and home to Oliver Queen (Arrowverse).
Storybook Land	Pajanimals	Sprout	A storybook village where Edwin lives and serves as the supporting location of the show.
Storybrooke, Maine	Once Upon a Time	ABC	Storybrooke, Maine, is a fictional city whose residents are characters from various fairy tales sent to this world by a powerful curse cast by the Evil Queen.
Sucupira, Bahia	O Bem Amado	TV Globo	Sucupira is a fictional town who Odorico Paraguaçu is the mayor
Summer Bay	Home and Away	Seven Network	Summer Bay setting for the Australian soap opera Home and Away and since the creation of the show in 1988 almost all of the action in the show takes place inside this small New South Wales coastal town. Notable long running locations in the area have included the Surf Life Saving Club, the High School, caravan park and diner. Nearby towns include Mangrove River and Yabbie Creek.
Sunnydale, California	Buffy the Vampire Slayer	The WB	Sunnydale, California is the fictional setting for the U.S. television drama Buffy the Vampire Slayer. Series creator Joss Whedon conceived the town as a representation of a generic California city, as well as a narrative parody of the all-too-serene towns typical in traditional horror movies. Sunnydale is located on a "Hellmouth"; a portal "between this reality and the next", and convergence point of mystical energies.
Twin Peaks, Washington	Twin Peaks	ABC	Twin Peaks is the small town in David Lynch's television serial drama of the same title. Known for its supernatural occurrences.
Upper Kumbukta West	Hey Hey It's Saturday	Nine Network	Running gags on the show referred to Upper Kumbukta West, a fictional country town in New South Wales, Australia; home of radio station 2KW and the character "Mrs Mac".
Upper Uncton, England	Married... with Children	ELP Communications and Columbia Pictures Television and Tandem Productions	Upper Unton is an English village in the 3 part episode England Show.
Ventura	Chocolate com Pimenta	TV Globo	Ventura is a fictional countryside town, most kwoned by the local chocolate factory.
Vila Feliz, Minas Gerais	Felicidade	TV Globo	Fictional quiet town, Helena's home and located in Minas Gerais.
Vila da Prata, Paraná	Cavalo de Aço	TV Globo	Fictional city, located in Paraná.
Vila dos Ventos, Rio Grande do Norte	Caribbean Flower	TV Globo	Fictional town, located near Natal, in Rio Grande do Norte.
Walford	EastEnders	BBC	Walford is a fictional borough of east London.
Walmington-on-Sea	Dad's Army	BBC	Walmington-on-Sea is a fictional seaside resort that is the setting of Dad's Army, including the BBC Television sitcom, the BBC Radio 4 series and two feature films. Walmington is on the south coast of England which, following the evacuation of the British Expeditionary Force from Dunkirk during the Second World War, found itself on the front line against Hitler.
Wayward Pines, Idaho	Wayward Pines	FOX	Wayward Pines is a fictional town in Idaho, where no one can escape.
Weatherfield	Coronation Street	ITV	A fictional town in Greater Manchester, United Kingdom based on Salford. Much of Weatherfield has been seen by viewers throughout the years, however, the primary focus in the viewer's perspective is the eponymous Coronation Street.
The Village	The Prisoner	ITV	A nameless village in an unknown location, it is used by powers unknown to host, convert and extract information from retired spies and other intelligence and military personnel.
Topi	Topi	Kinopoisk HD	A village in the north of Arkhangelsk Oblast, Russia, which is adjacent to a large factory and a monastery. It is ruled by a mysterious man, known as "The Owner", who poisoned the village's water supply, making locals hallucinate en masse. There is no escape from the village.
Townsville	Powerpuff Girls	Cartoon Network	
Twin Peaks, Washington	Twin Peaks	ABC	Twin Peaks is a town and the main setting of the series. The population of the town is 51,201.
Voltafiore, Italy	McHale's Navy Season 4	ABC	A fictional village in southern Italy. The 500-year-old town lies near the towns of Marinello, San Marcello, Porto Lorenzo, and others. McHale and the boats of PT Squadron 19 are transferred there in 1944 for the remainder of the war. The town is headed by the conman Mayor Mario Lugatto.
Webster, Connecticut	Atypical	Netflix	Shown on the address of mail sent to the address of the family of the central character.
Winden	Dark	Netflix	A fictional town in Germany with a nuclear power plant and a cave system in it. In 2019, two children go missing and one unidentified child is found dead in a local forest, what leads the locals to discover the time portals in the caves.
Wind Gap, Missouri	Sharp Objects	HBO	A fictional town in the state of Missouri, known for its pig farms. Every summer, locals celebrate the Calhoun Day, related to the founder of the town and a Confederate soldier, Zeke Calhoun.
Woodbury, Georgia	The Walking Dead	AMC	A small town in northern Georgia. Following the zombie apocalypse, the area was fortified and turned into a settlement led by a figure known as The Governor.
Yaslıhan	Merhamet	Kanal D	A fictional city and district in the Balıkesir Province, Turkey, which Narin was raised.
Yoorana	Glitch	ABC	Yoorana is a small town in the Australian state of Victoria, where seven people return from the dead in perfect health but with no recollection of who they are and what happened to them.
Yumemi, Japan	Kamen Rider OOO	TV Asahi	Located near Tokyo, this city is the main setting of Kamen Rider OOO and the headquarters of Kougami Foundation, a powerful Japanese conglomerate.
Zaslavsk	The Method	Channel One Russia	A Russian town where a school shooting occurs.
Zawame, Japan	Kamen Rider Gaim	TV Asahi	Located near Tokyo, this city is the main setting of Kamen Rider Gaim and is known for being a planned city, built by Yggdrasill Corporation, powerful Japanese conglomerate.
