= Ebenezer Bray =

American physician and politician

- Bray c. 1858

Member of the Minnesota House of Representatives from the 19th District
- In office December 2, 1857 – December 6, 1859

Personal details
- Born: August 29, 1817 Androscoggin County, Maine, U.S.
- Died: March 14, 1891 (aged 73) Hennepin County, Minnesota, U.S.
- Other political affiliations: Democrat

Ebenezer Bray (August 29, 1817 – March 14, 1891) was an American physician, politician, and early citizen of both Carver, Minnesota and Norwood Young America, Minnesota who served as single term in the Minnesota House of Representatives during the 1st Minnesota Legislature. Bray was the father of Minnesota Prohibition Party candidate Newton Bray, who ran unsuccessfully for Minnesota's 4th congressional district during the 1898 United States House of Representatives elections against Frederick Stevens.

== Early life ==
Bray was born on August 29, 1817, in Androscoggin County, Maine. Bray moved to Minnesota Territory around 1857 and settled in Carver, Minnesota. While in Minnesota, Bray was a member of the board of directors of the Winona Normal School (now Winona State University), alongside Lieutenant Governor William Holcombe, J.D. Ford, and Alfred Elisha Ames.

== Political career ==
Bray was elected on October 13, 1857, to serve in the Minnesota House of Representatives representing Minnesota's 19th House district alongside Ernst Heyd of Scandia township in Carver County. At the time the 19th House district included Carver County and Wright County. Bray served in the 1st Minnesota Legislature from December 2, 1857, to December 6, 1859. During his term Bray was the chair of the Elections Committee. Bray was a member of the Minnesota Democratic Party.

Bray later served on the city council for the city of Carver, Minnesota, from 1865 to 1866.

== Personal life and death ==
Bray was married to Angeline Noyes in Excelsior, Minnesota, in 1859. Bray died on March 14, 1891, and is buried in Excelsior.
