= Paranormalcy =

Young adult urban fantasy novel series by Kiersten White

- Cover of the first novel
- Paranormalcy; Supernaturally; Endlessly
- Author: Kiersten White
- Country: United States
- Language: English
- Genre: Urban fantasy
- Publisher: HarperCollins
- Published: August 31, 2010
- Media type: Print (Hardcover)

Paranormalcy is a series of young adult urban fantasy novels by American author Kiersten White, beginning with the entry of the same name. The story focuses on a girl named Evie, a member of a special international police force assigned to paranormal cases. As the tale progresses, Evie's professional duties begin to conflict with her growing desire for a normal life.

The first novel received numerous advance reviews from young-adult authors, and debuted at #7 on the New York Times Best Seller list in the "Children's Books—Chapter Books" category. Prior to the novel's release, a film adaptation entered the early planning stages.

== Overview ==
Paranormalcy follows the efforts of the International Paranormal Containment Agency (IPCA), a group tasked with policing various mythological beings who live secretly among humans. The protagonist of the story is an IPCA officer named Evie, a teenage girl who possesses an ability to detect paranormals disguised as human beings.

Evie's allies include a shape-shifting boy named Lend Pirello, who she meets as the story begins, and a faerie named Reth, whom she previously admired. Both young men become romantic interests of Evie's as the tale progresses, while the three of them are joined by other companions as well. At its center, Paranormalcy examines Evie's attempts to balance her IPCA duties with her growing desire to lead a normal teenage life.

== Background ==
=== Conception ===
While experiencing "an abundance of normal" during the early phases of motherhood, author Kiersten White developed "a fascination with all things paranormal". She eventually began to question "what you'd do with a vampire if you didn't want to kill it." This led her to envision the International Paranormal Containment Agency, along with the story's cast.

The author has stated that she wrote the first Paranormalcy novel "on a whim", during which time she was attempting to have a different story published. Eventually, she and her agent decided to make Paranormalcy their priority, which led to it being acquired by HarperCollins in 2009.

=== Story development ===
"Evie, the main character, started talking to me and then I thought, why on earth would a sixteen-year-old work for a covert, international government organization? The rest of the plot just sort of fell into place!"

— Kiersten White

To facilitate her work, White researched a number of mythological creatures, and wrote while listening to an Internet radio station "tailored to the mood of the book."

Many of the story's themes were drawn from the author's own experiences as a teenager—including matters of loneliness, secrecy, and isolation. White was also inspired by the events of "a tough time" during her adult life. However, she ultimately found this to be an inappropriate foundation for the character of Evie, who she considers vulnerable but spunky. She then rewrote certain material in order to find the proper voice for her protagonist.

As the series debuted, White commented on what readers might ultimately expect from the character, saying, "I would hope it's like having a conversation with your best friend, if your best friend were always articulate and funny."

== Novels ==
Book #	Title	US release
1	Paranormalcy	August 31, 2010
Evie, a teenage girl who can detect disguised paranormal beings, works as an officer for the International Paranormal Containment Agency. She is joined in her duties by other gifted agents, including two love interests named Lend and Reth. As the story progresses, however, the team discovers a bigger threat looming, and must work to avert it.
2	Supernaturally	July 26, 2011
Evie finally has the normal life she always wanted, but finds herself growing bored. When Evie joins the IPCA again, she is dragged into a series of disastrous missions, and eventually ends up in a battle between the fairy courts.
3	Endlessly	July 24, 2012
In the final installment, Evie must deal with a new IPCA director, as well as the continuing battle against the Dark Faerie Queen.

== Release ==
=== Publicity ===
Prior to the release of Paranormalcy, White commended her publisher and agent for being "very supportive and involved," also complimenting the work of her publicist. In anticipation of the series' debut, HarperCollins produced an Internet book trailer and a video interview with the author. Multiple websites presented contests for signed or advance copies of the first novel. Additionally, numerous copies were released for early review by Book It Forward Tours. Book signings were also scheduled for White. According to a Publishers Weekly report, the opening novel received "strong interest" at the 2010 Bologna Children's Book Fair. In addition, interest in producing a film adaptation arose prior to the novel series' release.

=== Reception ===
Paranormalcy debuted at #7 on the New York Times Best Seller list in the category of children's chapter books. The first novel has received positive feedback from several young-adult fantasy authors. After reading an advance copy, Becca Fitzpatrick, writer of the Hush, Hush series, called the book a "fast, flirty roller coaster of a ride," going on to label it "sassy, light-hearted and downright scary." Carrie Ryan, author of The Forest of Hands and Teeth, stated that White had created a "perfect blend of light and dark," and applauded the "cunning wit" in the character of Evie. Aprilynne Pike gave particular praise to the romantic portions of the first book, while Lisa McMann stated that "strong characters, a clever premise, and a hilarious voice all team up to make Paranormalcy the most refreshing paranormal debut of the year."

An article for School Library Journal described the story as a cross between Buffy the Vampire Slayer and Men In Black. Author Sarah J. Maas gave the novel a glowing review, stating that it consistently held her attention, and calling Evie "the perfect blend of sass, smarts, and sensitivity". She also stated that, "In a desert of stalker-esque, sparkling, and all-around emo love interests, Lend is an oasis." With regard to the overall story, she concluded, "I haven't read something this delightful in a while".

The first novel received a starred review from Publishers Weekly, which noted the story's fast pace and commended the "absorbing romance" between Lend and Evie. The Hiding Spot also praised the novel's pacing, and lauded "the variety of fantastical and interesting characters White packed into Evie's world." However, the review found the romance between Evie and Lend to be lacking, citing a minimal amount of tension as the primary reason. The Compulsive Reader stated that the story "delves both into faerie lore and Evie's own nature, which is not only fascinating, but suspenseful." In a review for Salt Lake City Weekly, Scott Renshaw commented on the young-adult paranormal genre, and remarked that "Paranormalcy refuses to wallow in the angst we might have come to expect from such tales." He also applauded the narration as "lively", and declared the story "an appealing adventure that provides a few twists on familiar premises." While reviewing Supernaturally, Renshaw described Evie as "a heroine who's troubled without being mopey and is never a passive participant in the wild events around her."
