= Ernst Heyd =

American politician and surveyor

- Ambrotype of Heyd c. 1858

Member of the Minnesota House of Representatives from the 19th District
- In office December 2, 1857 – December 6, 1859 Serving with Josiah H. Talbot and Ebenezer Bray
- Preceded by: Position established
- Succeeded by: Jackson Taylor and F.A. Renz

Personal details
- Born: c. 1827 Kingdom of Württemberg, German Confederation
- Died: January 5, 1864 Waconia, Minnesota, U.S.

Ernst Heyd (c. 1827 – January 5, 1864) was a German American politician and surveyor who served a single term in the Minnesota House of Representatives.

== Early life and career ==
Heyd was born in the Kingdom of Württemberg. Heyd emigrated to the United States in 1849, originally residing in Pennsylvania. Heyd later moved to Minnesota Territory in 1853 and settled in Scandia Township in Carver County, Minnesota. While in Carver County, Heyd worked as a surveyor. Heyd later served as the first county surveyor of Carver County. During the American Civil War Heyd was the assistant deputy marshal to provost marshal Captain George H. Keith.

== Political career ==
Heyd was elected to serve in the Minnesota House of Representatives on October 13, 1857 representing Minnesota's 19th House district during the 1st Minnesota Legislature. At the time the 19th House district included Carver County and Wright County. During his term in the legislature, Heyd was a member of the Indian Affairs committee.

In 1863 Heyd nominated Charles Scheffer by acclamation as Minnesota State Treasurer, with no opposition to Heyd's nomination, Scheffer was nominated without a formal ballot. Heyd was later a delegate representing Carver County for the September 8, 1863 Republican convention for Minnesota's 6th Senate district.

== Death ==
Heyd died of typhoid fever at the age of 37 on January 5, 1864 in Waconia, Minnesota.

== Legacy ==
Hydes Lake in Carver County was named after Heyd. Heyd had previously owned property near the modern-day lake.
