= Hyd =

Hyd, or HYD, may refer to:

- Hana Yori Dango, a Japanese manga and anime series
- Hayden Dunham, an American musician and artist
- Highways Department, a department of the Hong Kong Government
- Hydrogenation
- HYD, the China Railway pinyin code for Hengyang East railway station,
- HYD. the IATA code for Rajiv Gandhi International Airport serving Hyderabad, India
- Hyderabad, the capital of the state of Telangana in India
- HYD, the National Rail code for Heyford railway station in the county of Oxfordshire, UK
- HY"D, an honorific for Jewish martyrs.

== See also ==
- Hyde (disambiguation)
- Hyderabad (disambiguation)
