= Hide (surname) =

Hide is a surname. Notable people with the surname include:

- Arthur Hide (1860–1933), English first-class cricketer
- Edward Hide (1937–2023), British jockey
- Herbie Hide (born 1971), British boxer
- Jesse Hide (1857–1924), English cricketer
- Molly Hide (1913–1995), English cricketer
- Peter Hide (born 1944), English sculptor
- Raymond Hide (1929–2016), British physicist
- Rodney Hide (born 1956), New Zealand politician
- Sam Hide, historic or apocryphal character
- Yuki Hide (1940–1998), Japanese singer

== See also ==
- Jack Hides (1906–1938), Australian explorer
- Charlie Hides (born 1964), American drag queen
- Hyde (surname)
