= Hidé Ishiguro =

Japanese philosopher (1931–2026)

Hidé Ishiguro (Japanese: 石黒ひで, Ishiguro Hidé; 4 August 1931 – 18 February 2026) was a Japanese analytic philosopher and emeritus professor at Keio University, Tokyo. She is considered an expert on the philosopher Gottfried Wilhelm Leibniz on whom she published many papers. She was also a Wittgenstein scholar.

== Life and career ==
Hide Ishiguro was born in Tokyo, Japan in August 1931, the daughter of Kyugo Ishiguro and Katsuyo Go. She was raised a Catholic and attended Sacred Heart High School where she won a scholarship.

Ishiguro attended Tokyo University obtaining her BA degree in 1956. She pursued graduate studies at the Sorbonne followed by a doctorate in philosophy at Somerville College, Oxford. At Oxford she was taught by G.E.M. Anscombe and her doctoral thesis was supervised by Peter Strawson and Gilbert Ryle. She was Reader in Philosophy University College London and Professor of Philosophy at Columbia University, and Keio University, Tokyo.

Her first book, Leibniz's Philosophy of Logic and Language (1972) takes issue with several traditional interpretations of Leibniz. She suggested an interpretation of Leibniz's conceptual logic within the frame of possible world semantics.

She wrote numerous articles on philosophy of language, logic and philosophy of psychology.

In 2007 a conference in her honour was hosted by the Philosophy Department of University College London and the Institute of Philosophy, University of London.

Ishiguro was married to philosopher David Wiggins until their divorce a few years later. She died on 18 February 2026.

== Publications ==
Book

- Leibniz's Philosophy of Logic and Language (Cambridge University Press, 1972)

Selected journal articles

- Ishiguro, Hidé (1969). Use and Reference of Names, in P. Winch, (ed) Studies in the Philosophy of Wittgenstein, London: Routledge & Kegan Paul, pp. 20–51.
- Ishiguro, Hideko (1972). Leibniz's Philosophy of Logic and Language. Philosophy East and West 24 (3):376–378.
- Ishiguro, Hidé (1971). Leibniz and the Ideas of Sensible Qualities: Hidé Ishiguro. Royal Institute of Philosophy Supplement 5:49–63.
- Mondadori, Fabrizio & Ishiguro, Hide (1975). Leibniz's Philosophy of Logic and Language. Philosophical Review 84 (1):140.
- Ishiguro, Hidé & Skorupski, John (1980). Possibility. Aristotelian Society Supplementary Volume 54 (1):73–104.
- Ishiguro, Hidé (1981). Wittgenstein and the Theory of Types. In Irving Block (ed.), Perspectives on the Philosophy of Wittgenstein. Basil Blackwell 43–60.
- Ishiguro, Hidé (1981). Contingent Truths and Possible Worlds. In R. S. Woolhouse (ed.), Leibniz: Metaphysics and Philosophy of Science. Oxford University Press 357–367.
- Ishiguro, Hidé (1981). Thought and Will in Wittgenstein's Tractatus.
- Ishiguro, Hidé (1990). Can the World Impose Logical Structure on Language?, in R. Haller and J. Brandl (eds.), Wittgenstein - Eine Neubewertung. Akten des 14. Internationalen Wittgenstein-Symposiums, Wien: Hölder-Pichler-Tempsky, 21–34.
- Ishiguro, Hidé (1994). On Representations. European Journal of Philosophy 2 (2):109–124.
- Ishiguro, Hidé (1996). Points of View, Places and Individuals. Acta Philosophica Fennica 61:13–22.
- Ishiguro, Hidé (1998). Unity Without Simplicity: Leibniz on Organisms. The Monist 81 (4):534–552.
- Ishiguro, Hidé (2001). The so-called picture theory: language and the world in Tractatus logico-philosophicus. Glock (ed.), Wittgenstein: A Critical Reader, Blackwell, Oxford, pp. 26–46.
