= Hyde End, Berkshire =

Coordinates: 51°22′31″N 1°12′58″W

Hyde End
- hamlet
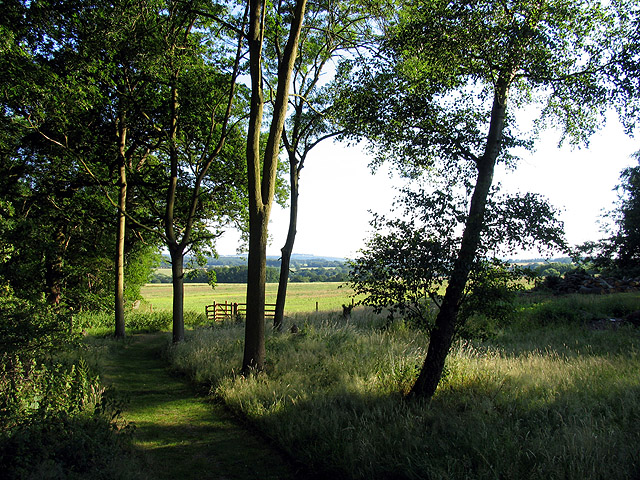
- Footpath at Hyde End Wood

- Location within Berkshire
- OS grid reference: SU551639
- Civil parish: Brimpton
- Unitary authority: West Berkshire
- Ceremonial county: Berkshire
- Region: South East
- Country: England
- Sovereign state: United Kingdom
- Post town: THATCHAM
- Postcode district: RG7
- Dialling code: 0118
- Police: Thames Valley
- Fire: Royal Berkshire
- Ambulance: South Central
- UK Parliament: Newbury

Hyde End is a small hamlet in the civil parish of Brimpton, in the West Berkshire district, in the ceremonial county of Berkshire, England. The settlement lies south of the A4 road and approximately 5.5 miles (8.9 km) south-east of Newbury. The nearest railway stations are Thatcham and Midgham, both around 3.5 miles (5.6 km) away on the Reading–Taunton line.

Hyde End House is a Grade II listed building, built around 1800.
