= Hydes Lake =

Lake in the state of Minnesota, United States

- Location within Minnesota
- Location: Carver County, Minnesota
- Coordinates: 44°48′55″N 93°52′29″W
- Type: lake

Hydes Lake is a lake in Carver County, Minnesota, in the United States.

Hydes Lake was named for Ernst Heyd, a government surveyor and member of the Minnesota House of Representatives who owned land near this lake.
