= Hyde Hall (disambiguation) =

Hyde Hall is a mansion in New York.

Hyde Hall may also refer to:

- Hyde Hall, Denton, building in Greater Manchester, England
- RHS Garden, Hyde Hall, Royal Horticultural Society's Garden in Essex, England
- Hyde Hall, Sawbridgeworth, Hertfordshire, England
