= Mister Magic (novel) =

Novel by Kiersten White

- Author: Kiersten White
- Audio read by: Rebecca Lowman
- Language: English
- Publisher: Del Rey
- Publication date: 2023
- Publication place: United States
- Media type: Print, e-book, audiobook
- Pages: 304 pages
- ISBN: 0593359267 First edition, hardback

Mister Magic is a 2023 horror novel by American writer Kiersten White. Published by Del Rey, the novel centers upon the five survivors of a children's television series that got cancelled due to a tragic accident.

== Synopsis ==
Thirty years ago, a terrible incident befell the child actors of the television show Mister Magic, resulting in its cancellation. In the present, few remember anything about the show other than the title character and his magic powers. The remaining cast members--Val, Isaac, Marcus, Javi, and Jenny--are called the Circle of Friends, and have returned to Bliss, Utah, where the series was filmed, so they can be interviewed for a reunion podcast.

Upon arrival, the Circle of Friends learn that for decades, the townspeople have been sending their problematic children through a dimensional rift containing an entity that feeds off the children's energy. The adults had struck a deal with the entity, where they would allow it to feed off the children in exchange for brainwashing and returning them. Each generation, the townspeople would send over an adult man who would serve as "Mister Magic", a guide for how the children must act and think. When the entity inevitably absorbs the adult, a new one would be chosen from among the prior returnees. When radio and television became available, the entity began sending the parents broadcasts showing the children. Recognizing its ability to further the agenda, the townspeople send the broadcasts to homes throughout the country, in the process allowing the entity to feed off of the children watching the show and learning the conservative lessons the Bliss townspeople demanded.

This partnership had gone unchallenged for decades until Val was sent through for reprogramming. However due to her strong willpower, Val was able to suppress the entity and Magic Man, even stealing the magical cape to keep her friends safe and entertained. During one broadcast, Val's father realizes the toll this is taking on his daughter and pulls her from the rift, accidentally taking the cape along with them. This leaves the remaining children unprotected and the entity attacks, absorbing Val's sister Kitty before the adults could retrieve them. Later, the townspeople try to revive the show by sending more children through, only for the entity to devour them all, because there was no replacement for the current Mister Magic. This revelation is part of the reason why the town invited the survivors, as they wanted Isaac to become the new Magic Man.

The survivors go through the rift to confront the entity, where they learn that the entity is allowed to keep any children deemed "unfixable". These children are still alive, but are not whole enough to pass through the rift. The group also learns that one of them must remain behind to serve as the new Mister Magic. Val realizes that it must be her and pushes her friends through the rift, sealing it behind them so no others can be sent through.

Mister Magic is revived, but in a new format that shows Val's near total control over the entity. Episodes are streamed online and rather than conservative lessons, Val, as the new Mister Magic, tells the viewers that there is nothing wrong with them and that they are just learning as they grow. Occasionally, Val will find ways to send messages to her friends to let them know that she is fine and that they shouldn't worry about her.

== Development ==
While writing Mister Magic White drew upon her experiences with the Church of Jesus Christ of Latter-day Saints, both as an active member and her choice to leave the religion. In an interview with The Salt Lake Tribune White stated that "Writing the novel gave me the chance to dive into this idea we have of what childhood should be" and that “A lot of conservative religions teach this sort of ownership over children’s lives and minds and hearts — that they are there for us to mold, to make into our version of the ideal girl or boy. But it’s a kind of violence, superimposing our ideal of who our children should be and ignoring who they actually are.”

== Release ==
Mister Magic was first published in hardback and e-book formats in the United States on August 8, 2023, through Del Rey. An audiobook adaptation narrated by Rebecca Lowman was released on the same day, through Random House Audio.

A paperback edition was published on May 28, 2024, also through Del Rey. Mister Magic was translated into Spanish by Alicia Botella Juan and published through Umbriel.

== Reception ==
In a review for The Washington Post, Charlie Jane Anders praised White for showing the allure of nostalgia "even as she demonstrates how hard it is to grow up and face the ugly truths that shadowed our younger years." The book also received reviews from Our Sunday Visitor and The Guardian, the latter of which called it "a suspenseful, spooky tale that resonates with contemporary anxieties."

== Graphic novel adaptation ==
In 2026, Mister Magic was adapted into an authorized graphic novel illustrated by Andy and Veronica Fish and published by Ten Speed Graphic.
