= Kiersten White =

American children's author, born 1983

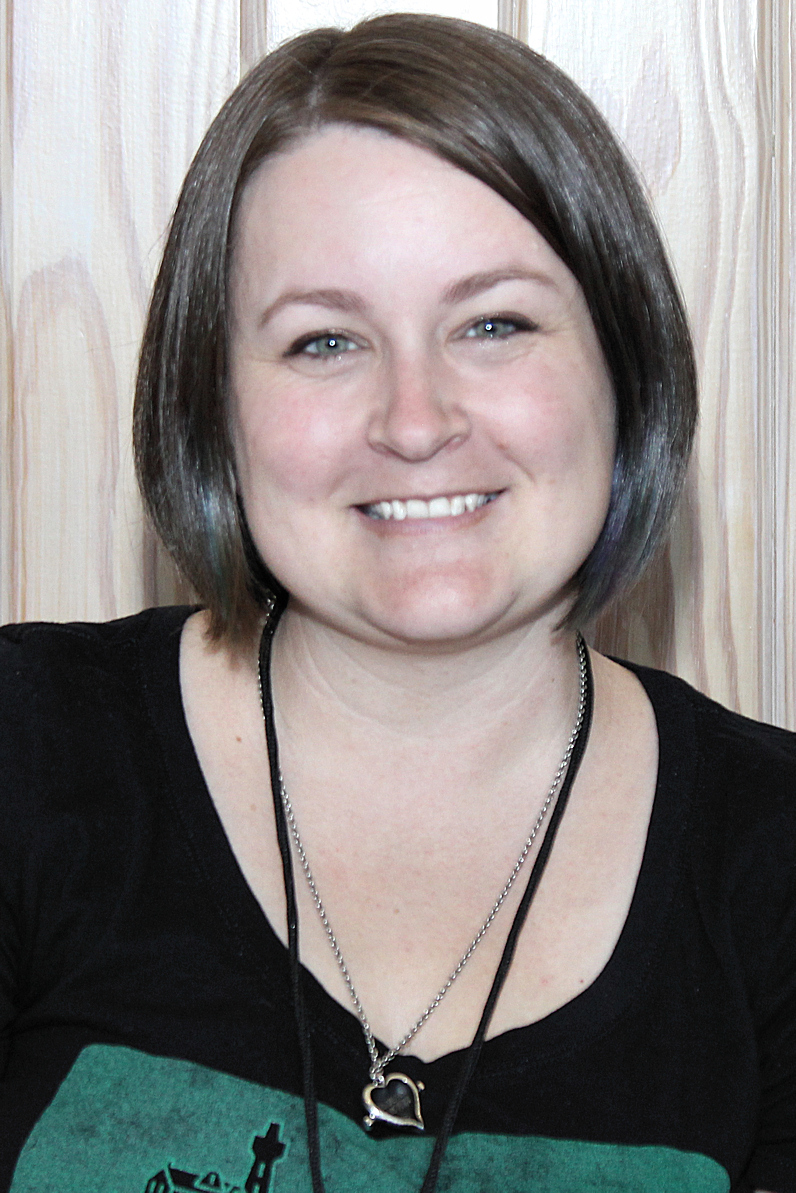
- White at the 2018 Texas Teen Book Festival
- Born: Kiersten White; 1983 (age 42–43); Utah
- Education: Brigham Young University
- Occupation: Writer
- Writing career
- Notable awards: Best Novel by a New Author (2010); Speculative Youth Fiction (2014); YALSA Teen Top Ten Award (2015)
- Website: kierstenwhite.com

Kiersten White is an American author of fiction for children, young adults, and adults. Her first book, Paranormalcy, was published by HarperCollins in 2010.

== Early life ==
White graduated in 2004 from Brigham Young University, where she studied English. She lives with her family in San Diego, California. White was raised Mormon but is no longer practicing. She is bisexual.

== Career ==
White is a writer covering a variety of genres (fantasy, historical fiction, paranormal, horror); she writes middle grade, young adult, and adult fiction.

== Awards and honors ==
The Dark Descent of Elizabeth Frankenstein won the 2018 Bram Stoker Award for Young Adult category. White's first novel, Paranormalcy (2009), debuted at #7 on the New York Times Best Seller list in the "Children's Books—Chapter Books" category. The Utah Book Awards presented White with the Young Adult book award in 2011. The book has garnered praise in the 2010 Librarian Preview. A subsequent work received mention on the Lone Star Reading List, Beanstalker and Other Hilarious Scary Tales (2017); And I Darken (2016) received mention on the 2017 Rainbow Book List. In 2022, her novel Star Wars: Padawan debuted at number one on the New York Times Best Seller list.

=== Awards ===
Year	Nominee	Award	Category	Result	Ref
2011	Paranormalcy	11th Utah Book Awards	Young Adult	Won	
2017	And I Darken	ALA Rainbow Book List	Young Adult	Won	
2019	The Dark Descent of Elizabeth Frankenstein	Bram Stoker Awards	BSA–Young Adult	Won	

== Bibliography ==
=== Standalone novels ===
- The Chaos of Stars (2013; HarperTeen) – ISBN 978-0062135926
- Illusions of Fate (2014; HarperTeen) – ISBN 978-0062135896
- The Dark Descent of Elizabeth Frankenstein (2018; Delacorte Press) – ISBN 978-0525577942
- Hide (2022; Del Rey Books) – ISBN 978-0593359235
- Mister Magic (2023; Del Rey Books) – ISBN 978-0593359266
- Lucy Undying (2024; Del Rey Books) - ISBN 9780593724408

=== Chapbooks ===
- Reality No-Show (2016; Serial Box) – ISBN 978-1682100998
- The End of the Beginning (2016; Serial Box) – ISBN 978-1682101087

=== Paranormalcy series ===
1. Paranormalcy (2010; HarperTeen) – ISBN 978-0061985843
2. Supernaturally (2011; HarperTeen) – ISBN 978-0061985867
3. Endlessly (2012; HarperTeen) – ISBN 978-0061985881

=== Mind Games series ===
1. Mind Games (2013; HarperTeen) – ISBN 978-0062135315
2. Perfect Lies (2014; HarperTeen) – ISBN 978-0062135841

Novellas:

- 0.5. Annie and Fia (2013; HarperTeen) – ISBN 978-0062321497 (e-book)

=== The Conqueror's Saga ===
1. And I Darken (2016; Delacorte Press) – ISBN 978-0553522310
2. Now I Rise (2017; Delacorte Press) – ISBN 978-0553522358
3. Bright We Burn (2018; Delacorte Press) – ISBN 978-0553522396

=== Camelot Rising ===
1. The Guinevere Deception (2019; Delacorte Press) – ISBN 978-0525581673
2. The Camelot Betrayal (2020; Delacorte Press) – ISBN 978-0525581710
3. The Excalibur Curse (2021; Delacorte Press) – ISBN 978-0525581758

=== Sinister Summer ===
1. Wretched Waterpark (2022; Delacorte Press) – ISBN 978-0593379042
2. Vampiric Vacation (2022; Delacorte Press) – ISBN 978-0593379080
3. Camp Creepy (2023; Delacorte Press) – ISBN 978-0593379127
4. Menacing Manor (2023; Delacorte Press) – ISBN 978-0593570012
5. Haunted Holiday (2024; Delacorte Press) – ISBN 978-0593570050

=== Slayer (Buffy the Vampire Slayer universe) ===
1. Slayer (2019; Simon Pulse) – ISBN 978-1534404953
2. Chosen (2020; Simon Pulse) – ISBN 978-1534404984

=== Star Wars universe ===
- "Eyes of the Empire" in The Empire Strikes Back: From a Certain Point of View anthology (2020; Del Rey Books) – ISBN 978-0593157749
- Padawan (2022; Disney-Lucasfilm Press) – ISBN 978-3833242571

=== Collections ===
- Beanstalker and Other Hilarious Scarytales (2017; Scholastic) – ISBN 978-0545940603

=== Graphic novels ===
- In the Shadows with Jim Di Bartolo (2014; Scholastic) – ISBN 978-0545561440

=== Contributions to anthologies ===
Year	Contribution	Anthology	Editor	ISBN
2011	"Tick, Tick, Boom" (short story)	Corsets & Clockwork: 13 Steampunk Romances	ed. Trisha Telep	ISBN 978-0762440924
2014	"Womb" (short story)	Altered Perceptions	ed. Brandon Sanderson, Dan Wells, Robison Wells	
2021	"Partying is Such Sweet Sorrow" (short story)	That Way Madness Lies	ed. Dahlia Adler	ISBN 978-1-250-75386-1
