= Hyde (company) =

Electronic cigarette manufacturer

- Industry: Electronic cigarettes
- Founded: 2021
- Area served: North America and the United Kingdom
- Website: hydedisposables.com

Hyde is multinational electronic cigarette manufacture that specifically creates disposable electronic cigarettes.

== History ==
The Hyde brand company in the United States was created in 2021 by Magellan Technology Inc. in Sacramento, California. They were popular among high school students due to their flavors according to an Food and Drug Administration report. Hyde was considered the sixth to third most popular choice among both middle schoolers and high schoolers when it came to electronic cigarette devices. Hyde used synthetic nicotine in their vape formulas which was branded as healthier than other tobacco-based vapes. The smaller electronic cigarettes were created with 1.6 mL of nicotine salt e-liquid with 50 mg of salt nicotine, powered by a 380 mA h battery. The electronic cigarettes had a variant called Hyde Edge which came in three different devices based on the amount of "puffs" it had, these were Hyde Edge 1500 Puffs, Hyde Edge 3300 Puffs, and Hyde Edge Rave 4000 Puffs, all having different sizes and battery powers.

On October 6, 2022, Hyde received an Marketing Denial Orders (MDO) by the Food and Drug Administration hindering their ability to legally sell electronic cigarettes in the United States. This was done through the Food and Drug Administration's premarket tobacco product application, though the parent company of Hyde, Magellan Technology, stated that the Food and Drug Administration failed to inform the company of the MDO, leading the Food and Drug Administration to give Magellan Technology a Refuse to Accept letter for all Hyde products after Magellan Technology's acknowledgement of the MDO. Hyde also had a United Kingdom sector created by Matt Lord, the same year the American sector was founded, that sold electronic cigarettes. It dissolved on December 10, 2024.
