= Hide (novel) =

2022 novel by Kiersten White

- Author: Kiersten White
- Audio read by: Emma Galvin
- Language: English
- Genre: Horror, thriller
- Publisher: Del Rey
- Publication date: 2022
- Publication place: United States
- Media type: Print (hardback, paperback), e-book, audiobook
- Pages: 256 pages
- ISBN: 0593359232 First edition hardcover

Hide is a horror thriller novel by American author Kiersten White. First published in the United States in 2022 through Del Rey, the novel centers upon a group of young adults who were brought to an abandoned amusement park in hopes of winning a cash prize.

In 2023 a graphic novel adaptation was released through Ten Speed Graphic.

== Synopsis ==
Fourteen people have been brought to the town of Asterion, home of an abandoned amusement park where a little girl went missing decades ago. Now the gates are going to be reopened so that these fourteen people can take part in an epic hide-and-seek contest where the winner will receive $50,000. Among the participants are a writer, gas station attendant, jewelry maker, aspiring influencers, an unemployed office worker, a military veteran, and the sole survivor of a father slaughtering his entire family. The contest's rules are simple: each day the contestants must hide from sunup to sundown. If they are found, they are disqualified. There are no rules against banding together to sabotage other contestants, and while only one person can win, they will receive a bonus if they find and retrieve a leatherbound journal. Although some of the participants are suspicious, particularly the survivor Mack and the military veteran Ava, all willingly agree to the event rules.

Although they are given explanations for any questions and concerns, such as the daily disappearances of fellow contestants, Mack and Ava both begin to suspect that something is not quite right with the competition. They and others hear strange sounds while they are hiding, including the scream of one of the missing contestants. They eventually discover the truth, that there is no competition and that they were all led there to feed an inhuman entity that was summoned by fourteen townspeople in the early 1900s. The summoners willingly exchanged their lives for prosperity, unaware that the entity would require additional sacrifices every seven years. These sacrifices must be descendants of the original summoners or they will be rejected. To avoid sending their own, now affluent people to the entity the townspeople instead chose to send their poorer relatives and illegitimate children to the entity, which they kept locked up behind a large gate. The amusement park was built many years later in order to both further contain the entity and provide an easy way to bring the relatives to it, however after the park closed the town had to turn to other methods to lure the chosen victims. This cycle, the town chose to lure the victims in using the hide-and-seek competition.

Eventually all of the contestants are picked off one by one, save for Mack, Ava, and another contestant, LeGrand. They manage to escape the park and confront the game coordinators, bringing them back with them to the park. Mack lures the entity to the coordinators using her blood, with the intent to have it feed upon the coordinators in the stead of the remaining contestants. Ava and LeGrand detonate the gate containing the entity. It is left open ended as to whether or not the cycle will continue with the entity free to choose its victims, if the entity will continue to feed upon the townspeople without sleeping, or if the cycle has finally come to an end now that the entity is free.

== Development ==
White came up with the concept of Hide after learning of an adult hide-and-seek competition in an abandoned resort town in Italy during the 2010s. The book marked a departure from her prior work in the young adult genre, as Hide was written for an adult audience. It took White about three years to complete Hide.

== Release ==
Hide was first published in hardback and e-book formats in the United States on May 24, 2022, through Del Rey. An audiobook adaptation narrated by Emma Galvin was released simultaneously through Random House Audio. A paperback edition was released the following year, also through Del Rey. Hide was also published in the United Kingdom in 2022, through Penguin Books, and a French translation was released through De Saxus in 2023, under the title Cache-cache mortel (tr: Deadly hide and seek).

== Adaptations ==
=== Graphic novel ===
A graphic novel adaptation of Hide was published on September 12, 2023 through Ten Speed Graphic. The novel was adapted for graphic novel format by Scott Peterson and was illustrated by Veronica and Andy Fish.

Joshua Gage of Cemetery Dance Publications praised the adaptation, stating that "Everything works in the story" and that "the art by Veronica and Andy T. Fish is clean and consistent with the story telling."

=== Television ===
In 2023 it was announced that television rights to Hide were picked up by Universal Television and Peacock. Ingrid Escajeda is to write the script for the series' pilot episode and will serve as an executive producer alongside Jordan Davis, John Davis and John Fox.

== Reception ==
Critical reception has been generally positive. Lacy Baugher Milas of Paste reviewed Hide, praising it for its atmosphere and setting while also noting that some readers might have preferred the novel's twists to be more based upon human evil as opposed to the supernatural. Hannah Renee of Grimdark Magazine rated the novel five stars, citing the characters and writing as highlights and calling the book "heart-wrenchingly beautiful".

=== Awards ===
- Dragon Award for Best Horror Novel (2022, nominated)
