= Rob Cover =

Rob Cover (born 31 May 1982, Canberra, Australia) is a social theorist and media scholar, specialising in critical sexuality studies, digital media theory, minority stereotyping and media scandals, with work on LGBTIQ youth suicide, cultures of social networking and audience interactivity, as well as cultural and media representations of population. He is Professor of Digital Communication at RMIT University, Melbourne, where he is a Director of the RMIT Digital Ethnography Research Centre. He was previously associate professor at The University of Western Australia, from 2013 to 2019 where he served as Deputy Head of the School of Social Sciences and has also held positions at The University of Adelaide and Victoria University of Wellington. Cover has held visiting research and teaching fellowships at The University of Queensland, the Indian Institute of Technology, Kharagpur, Karlstad University, and The Australian National University.

He received his Doctorate from Monash University, and is a frequent speaker and online commentator on contemporary media and minority issues. He also studied history and maintains a hobby-like interest in British and European history.

== Works ==
The author of numerous academic journal articles and creative short fiction, his books include:

- Queer Youth Suicide, Culture and Identity: Unliveable Lives? Ashgate, 2012, ISBN 9781409444473
- Vulnerability and Exposure: Footballer Scandals, Masculine Identity and Ethics, UWAP Scholarly, 2015, ISBN 9781742586496
- Digital Identities: Creating and Communicating the Online Self, Elsevier, 2016, ISBN 9780124200838
- Emergent Identities: New Sexualities, Genders and Relationships in a Digital Era, Routledge 2018, ISBN 9781138098619
- Youth, Sexuality and Sexual Citizenship (co-edited with Peter Aggleton, Deana Leahy, Daniel Marshall and Mary Lou Rasmussen), Routledge 2018, ISBN 9780815379874
- Flirting in the Era of #MeToo: Negotiating Intimacies (co-authored with Alison Bartlett and Kyra Clarke), Palgrave 2019, ISBN 978-3-030-15508-7
- Population, Mobility and Belonging: Understanding Population Concepts in Media, Culture and Society, Routledge 2020, ISBN 9780367186876
- Fake news in Digital Cultures: Technology, Populism and Digital Misinformation, Emerald 2022, ISBN 978-1-80117-877-8
- Identity and Digital Communication: Concepts, Theories, Practices, Routledge 2023, ISBN 9781032283951
- Identity in the COVID-19 Years: Communication, Crisis, and Ethics, Bloomsbury 2023, ISBN 978-1501393686
- Queer Memory and Storytelling: Gender and Sexually-Diverse Identities and Trans-Media Narrative, Routledge 2024, ISBN 978-1032497143.
