= Sam Hide =

American folk hero

Sam Hide is a historic or apocryphal character in the folklore of New England, United States, used in the folk saying "to lie like Sam Hide". There is no record of the death of a Sam Hide in the records of Dedham, Massachusetts though he is said to have died in 1732; however, Sam Hide is noted at age 105 at Dedham as being a sachem, chief or sagamore who first and last were, to a greater or less degree, land-holders, and leaders of the multifarious tribes of New England.

Hide was said to be a Native American, a great wit, and an infamous cider-drinker and liar. It has been speculated by James Wimer that Sam Hide may be a composite of several early anecdotes and stories.

== Tales ==
Numerous folk tales are told about Sam Hide; one such tale is that of Hide and a deer which illustrates his telling of lies or tall tales. In the story, Hide was in search of a glass of (hard) cider, so went to the house of a neighbor and offered, for the price of a crown (five shillings), to tell the man where he had shot and killed a deer. The man, wanting to find the deer meat, counter-offered half a crown, so Hide described a local meadow, then described a tree in that meadow, saying that the deer was to be found under that tree. The man went off to find the deer, but found none and returned home empty handed. Years later, he ran across Hide and accused him of trickery. Hide asked if the man would find it acceptable if an Indian told the truth half the time, and the man said he would. Hide then noted that he had told the truth about there being a meadow, and about there being a tree, just not about there being a deer beneath the tree, and concluded that he had told two truths to one lie, thus ending the matter.

George Lyman Kittredge recounts tales of Hide having faithfully served the English in wars against Indian tribes and earning himself the name of a brave soldier. In one story, Hide is said to have killed 19, of the enemy, and tried hard to make up the 20th, but was unable:

On July 3d, 1676, Major Talcott of Connecticut, who was pursuing King Philip in the Narragansett country, after surprising and defeating the enemy in a swamp, turned towards home, at the request of his Mohegan and Pequot allies. On the way his troops fell in with a party of sixty Indians, 'all of whom they slew and took'. One of the prisoners was a 'young sprightly fellow', whom his captors, the Mohegans, were allowed to put to death after their own savage fashion. 'And indeed', writes Hubbard, 'of all the enemies that have been subject of the precedent discourse; this villain did most deserve to become an object of justice and severity; for he boldly told them, that he had with his gun dispatched nineteen, and that he had charged it for the twentieth; but not meeting with any of ours, and unwilling to loose a fair shot, he had let fly at a Mohegan, and kill'd him; with which, having made up his number, he told them he was fully satisfied'.

The claim of the 19 enemy may have been from "Hubbard's Indian Wars", 1677 edition.
