= List of Buffyverse villains and supernatural beings =

The following is a list of demons, vampires, human monsters, walking dead, ghosts, beasts and any kind of evil being or supernatural creature seen in the Buffyverse (created by Joss Whedon).

== Demons, Half-Demons and Old Ones ==
- Acathla ("Becoming, Part Two")
- Ano-Movic Demons: The Straleys ("Bachelor Party")
- Anyanka
- Arney ("Offspring", "Lullaby")
- Artode ("Life of the Party")
- Assassin demon ("Sanctuary")
- Avilas ("Help")
- Baker ("The Ring")
- Balthazar ("Bad Girls")
- Barney the Empath Demon ("Parting Gifts")
- The Beast
- The Beast of Amalfie ("To Shanshu in L.A." and "Birthday")
- Billy Blim ("That Vision Thing", "Billy")
- Bohg'Dar Demon ("Salvage")
- Boone ("Blood Money")
- Boretz Demon ("Power Play")
- Brachen Demons ("Hero")
- Bringers
- Bro'os ("Teeth") the Loan-Shark demon ("Tabula Rasa")
- Brotherhood of Seven: Marc ("The Puppet Show")
- Senator Helen Brucker
- Cantonese Fook-Beast ("That Vision Thing")
- Carlos ("Underneath")
- Carnyss Demon ("Judgment")
- Chaos Demon ("Fool for Love")
- Champion Knight ("Judgment")
- Clem
- Codger Demon ("Heartthrob")
- Connor
- Cordelia Chase (became part-demon, never used powers for evil)
- Covenant of Trombli: Silas, Barshon
- Cyvus Vail
- Deevak ("First Impressions")
- Devlin ("Life of the Party")
- D'Hoffryn
- D'Hoffryn's acolytes in Arashmahaar ("Something Blue")
- D'Korr (D'Hoffryn's second demon hitman) ("Get It Done")
- Doc
- Doyle
- Drokken Beast ("Belonging")
- Drug Lord Demon ("The Prodigal")
- Durslar Beast ("Fredless")
- Durthok the Child-Eater ("Judgment")
- Eater Demon ("Slouching Toward Bethlehem")
- Eli ("Harm's Way")
- Eyghon the Sleepwalker ("The Dark Age")
- Ethros Demon ("I've Got You Under My Skin")
- Fell Brethren
- Dr. Fetvanovich ("Quickening")
- Flanjoid Demon ("To Shanshu in L.A.")
- Francis ("Release")
- Frocter Demon ("Release")
- Sid & Monica Frzylcka ("Double or Nothing")
- Fungus Demon ("The Harsh Light of Day")
- Fyarl Demon ("A New Man")
- Gachnar ("Fear, Itself")
- Garwak Demon ("Provider")
- Gathwok Demons: Vakma, Trensiduf ("Over the Rainbow")
- Gavrok Spiders ("Choices")
- The Gentlemen and their Silent Footmen ("Hush")
- Ghora Demon ("Forever")
- Glarghk Guhl Kashma'nik Demon ("Normal Again")
- Glory's Minions: Jinx, Dreg, Murk, Slook, Gronx and the High Priest Minion
- Glurgg ("Apocalypse, Nowish")
- Gnarl ("Same Time, Same Place")
- Goran Demons ("The Girl in Question")
- Granok Demons ("Forgiving")
- Grappler Demons ("Quickening")
- Grimslaw Demon ("Selfless")
- The Groosalugg
- Grox'lar Beast ("Just Rewards")
- Hainsley Demon ("Just Rewards")
- Haklar Demon ("Belonging")
- Halfrek
- Hans and Gretta Straus ("Gingerbread")
- Haxil Beast ("Expecting")
- Hellhound ("The Prom")
- The Hellions: Razor, Mag, Klyed ("Bargaining", Parts One and Two)
- Hellmouth Spawn ("Prophecy Girl", "The Zeppo")
- Hindu Kush ("Judgment")
- Howler Demons ("The Ring")
- Illyria
- Intestine demon ("Lonely Hearts")
- Izzerial the Devil
- Jenoff the Soul-Sucker ("Double or Nothing")
- Jenoff's Repo-Man ("Double or Nothing")
- Princess Jheira and the Oden-Tal females ("She")
- The Judge ("Surprise"), ("Innocence")
- Kailiff demon/Griff ("Rm w/a Vu")
- Kamal the Prio-Motu Demon ("Judgment")
- Karathmamanyugh Demon ("Spin the Bottle")
- Kathy Newman/Mok'tagar demon ("Living Conditions")
- Kek Demon ("I've Got You Under My Skin")
- Ken and the demon enslavers ("Anne")
- Der Kindestod ("Killed by Death")
- Kith'Harn Demons ("Origin")
- Kleynach Demon ("Reprise")
- Kovitch Demon ("She")
- Kulak of the Miquot Clan ("Homecoming")
- Kungai Demon ("Parting Gifts")
- Kurskov's minions ("Waiting in the Wings")
- Lachnie Hag ("Benediction")
- Lagos ("Revelations")
- Lasovic ("The Ring")
- Lei-Ach Demons ("Family")
- Lilliad Demons ("Dad")
- Lissa ("First Date")
- Lister Demons ("Hero")
- Liz ("Judgment")
- Lohesh (mentioned in "Graduation Day, Part One")
- Lorne's Id Monster ("Life of the Party")
- Lubber Demons ("Happy Anniversary")
- Lurconis ("Band Candy")
- Lurite Demon ("Heartthrob")
- Machida ("Reptile Boy")
- Madam Dorian and her Girls (Lina) ("War Zone")
- Mandraz ("Wrecked")
- M'Fashnik Demon ("Flooded")
- Mayor Richard Wilkins III aka Olvikan
- Mellish ("The Ring")
- M. James Menlo ("The Shroud of Rahmon")
- Merl
- Mofo Demon (Lenny Edward's demon muscle) ("War Zone")
- Mohra Demon ("I Will Remember You")
- Moloch the Corruptor ("I, Robot... You, Jane")
- Mordar the Bentback ("Judgment")
- Mucus Demon ("Double or Nothing")
- Multi-headed demon ("Supersymmetry")
- Mutite Demon ("Heartthrob")
- Nahdrah Demons ("Provider")
- Nezzla Demons ("Judgment")
- Norman Pfister ("What's My Line", Parts One and Two)
- Nurbatch Demon ("That Old Gang of Mine")
- Octarus (""What's My Line", Part Two)
- Olvikan ("Graduation Day, Part Two")
- Ovu Mobani ("Dead Man's Party")
- Piasca demon ("Lonely Hearts")
- Pockla Demon ("Dead End")
- Polgara Demons ("The I in Team")
- Prechian Demon ("The Thin Dead Line")
- Preggothian Demon ("Blind Date")
- Pyleans: Lorne, Constable Narwek, Landok, Numfar, Blix, Lorne's Mother (Deathwok clan), Pylean Royal Guard: The Captain of the Guard
- Queller Demon ("Listening to Fear")
- Quor-Toth Demon ("The Price")
- Rahmon ("The Shroud of Rahmon")
- Reptilian Demon ("Parting Gifts")
- Rodentius Demon ("Fredless")
- Rwasundi Demons ("Dead Things")
- Sahjhan
- Sahrvin Demons
- Sathari ("Power Play")
- The Scourge: Trask, Tiernan ("Hero")
- Archduke Sebassis
- Sebassis' Slave/Pee-Pee Demon
- Senih'D Demon ("Couplet")
- The Senior Partners of Wolfram & Hart
- Serparvo Demon ("Something Blue")
- Shorshack Demon ("I've Got You Under My Skin")
- Sloth Demon ("Judgment")
- Sorialus the Ravager ("Waiting in the Wings")
- Shur-Hod Demons ("Heartthrob")
- Sisterhood of Jhe ("The Zeppo")
- Skench Demon ("Double or Nothing")
- Skilosh Demons ("Epiphany")
- Skip
- Skyler ("Enemies")
- Slime Demon ("The Wish" & "To Shanshu in L.A.")
- Dr. Gregson the Slod Demon ("Heartthrob")
- Sluggoth Demon ("Beneath You")
- Smile Time Puppet-Demons: Polo, Ratio Hornblower, Flora, Groofus ("Smile Time")
- Soul-Eater ("Calvary")
- Stewart Burns ("Hell's Bells")
- Strom Demon ("Release")
- Suvolte Demon ("As You Were")
- Sweet ("Once More, With Feeling")
- Sweet's Lackeys ("Once More, With Feeling")
- Tarval Demon ("Expecting")
- Talamour/Burrower ("Lonely Heart")
- Taparrich and the Mok'tagar demons ("Living Conditions")
- Tezcatcatl ("The Cautionary Tale of Numero Cinco")
- The Thaumogenic Demon ("After Life")
- Thesulac Demon ("Are You Now or Have You Ever Been")
- Thraxis ("Life of the Party")
- Tien Shenin ("Judgment")
- Tom Cribb ("The Ring")
- Tor ("The Trial")
- Torto Demon ("Happy Anniversary")
- Torg ("Showtime")
- Toth ("The Replacement (Buffy the Vampire Slayer)")
- Tough Guy Demon ("That Old Gang of Mine")
- Tree Demon ("Couplet")
- Turfog the Thrall Demon ("Dear Boy")
- Vahrall Demons ("Doomed")
- Vajnu Demon ("The Shroud of Rahmon")
- Val Trepkos ("The Ring")
- Vampire Detector Demons ("Blind Date")
- Vartite Monster ("Judgment")
- Vigaries ("She")
- Vinji Demons ("Harm's Way")
- Vocah, Warrior of the Underworld, Bringer of Calamity ("To Shanshu in L.A.")
- Voynok Demon ("Supersymmetry")
- Vyasa ("The Shroud of Rahmon")
- Wan-Shang Dhole ("That Vision Thing")
- Wainakay Demon ("Happy Anniversary")
- Wolfram & Hart Failsafe Technician Demon ("You're Welcome")
- Wolfram & Hart Torturer Demon ("Underneath")
- Wraithers ("Loyalty")
- Whistler
- Yeska the Davric Demon ("Guise Will Be Guise")
- The Zealots of the Devourer: The High Priest Zealot, the Keeper of the Name ("Sacrifice", "Peace Out")

== Vampires ==
- Absalom ("When She Was Bad")
- Alonna Gunn
- Alphonse ("Doppelgangland")
- Andrew Borba ("Never Kill a Boy on the First Date")
- Andrew Hoelich ("Anne")
- Angel/Angelus
- Anne ("Lies My Parents Told Me"), Spike's mother
- Aurelius, who prophesied the coming of the Anointed One
- Big Ugly
- Billy "Ford" Fordham ("Lie to Me")
- Blair ("Helpless")
- Boone ("Who Are You?")
- Charles Gunn ("After the Fall")
- Charlotte ("Sleeper")
- Collin, the Anointed One
- Dalton
- Darla
- Doug Sanders
- Dracula ("Buffy vs. Dracula")
- Drusilla
- El Eliminati ("Bad Girls")
- Elisabeth
- The Gorch family: Lyle, Tector, and Candy ("Bad Eggs", "Homecoming")
- Harmony Kendall
- Holden Webster ("Conversations with Dead People")
- James
- Jamie ("Pangs")
- Jay-Don ("The Shroud of Rahmon")
- Jeff & Mutt ("Crush")
- Jesse McNally
- Julia ("Lie to Me")
- Kakistos ("Faith, Hope & Trick")
- Stephen Korshak ("Some Assembly Required")
- Lean Boy
- Lenny ("Lovers Walk")
- Luke
- Marcus ("In the Dark")
- The Master
- Buffy Summers ("Nightmares")
- Nostroyev ("Why We Fight")
- Prince of Lies ("Why We Fight")
- Rebel Vampire Posse: Carl, Justin, Zack, Glenn, Christy, Marla and others ("All the Way")
- Richard ("Lies My Parents Told Me")
- Russell Winters ("City Of")
- Sam Lawson ("Why We Fight")
- Mr. Sanderson ("Gingerbread")
- Sandy ("Doppelgangland", "Family", "Shadow")
- Sarah Holtz
- Spike
- Sunday and her gang: Dav, Rookie, Tom, Jerry and Eddie ("The Freshman")
- Theresa Klusmeyer ("Phases")
- Thomas ("Welcome to the Hellmouth")
- The Three ("Angel")
- The Three Sisters ("Buffy vs. Dracula")
- Tom ("The Harsh Light Of Day")
- Mr. Trick
- Turok-Han vampires
- Ul'thar Vampires
- Whip and the Hooker Vamps ("Into the Woods")
- Wishverse Willow ("The Wish", "Doppelgangland")
- Wishverse Xander ("The Wish")
- Zachary Kralik ("Helpless")

== Wizards, witches, sorcerers and other magic users ==
- Madam Anita ("Couplet")
- Captain Atkinson ("The Thin Dead Line")
- Helen Bointon ("Happy Anniversary")
- Magnus Bryce ("Guise Will Be Guise")
- Jenny Calendar
- Cordelia Chase (through the former power Jasmine; notably in "Orpheus" and "Inside Out")
- Command Central witches ("The Long Way Home" onwards)
- Michael Czajak ("Gingerbread")
- The Order of Dagon ("No Place Like Home")
- The Devonshire Coven (mentioned in "Grave" and "Lessons")
- Lucien Drake ("Soul Purpose")
- Rupert Giles
- Magnus Hainsley ("Just Rewards")
- Clan Kalderash: Enyos Kalderash, Magda Kalderash (The Elder Woman)
- Kumiko ("Wolves at the Gate, Parts 1-4")
- Count Kurskov ("Waiting in the Wings")
- Paul Lanier ("Guise Will Be Guise")
- Jonathan Levinson
- Allen Lloyd ("Sense & Sensitivity")
- Tara Maclay
- Catherine Madison ("Witch")
- Amy Madison ("Witch")
- Mistress Meerna ("A New World")
- Gwendolyn Post ("Revelations")
- Rack ("Wrecked", "Seeing Red", "Two to Go")
- Ethan Rayne
- Roden ("No Future For You, Parts 1-4")
- Marcus Roscoe ("Carpe Noctem")
- Willow Rosenberg
- Professor Oliver Seidel ("Supersymmetry")
- The Shadow-Men ("Get It Done")
- Spanky ("Conviction")
- Svear Priestesses ("Soulless")
- Thelonious ("I, Robot... You, Jane")
- Vaughne and the UC Sunnydale Wiccan Group ("The Killer in Me")
- Andrew Wells
- Wo-Pang of the Kung Sun Dai ("Awakening")
- Wesley Wyndam-Pryce

== Enhanced humans ==
- Brain Man ("That Vision Thing")
- Vanessa Brewer ("Blind Date")
- Caleb
- Bethany Chaulk ("Untouched")
- Command Central psychics and seers ("The Long Way Home" onwards)
- Connor
- The Holy Triumvirate (The Three Blind Seer Children) ("Blind Date")
- Mayor Richard Wilkins III
- Ronald Meltzer ("I Fall to Pieces")
- Cassie Newton ("Help")
- Gwen Raiden
- Marcie Ross and other Invisible Students ("Out of Mind, Out of Sight")
- Slayers
- Wolfram & Hart's Psychics ("Blind Date", "Quickening", "Hell Bound")
- Wolfram & Hart's Telekinetic Ninja Assassin ("Quickening")

== Dangerous mortals ==
- Hunt Acrey ("Redefinition")
- Richard Anderson ("Reptile Boy")
- Ryan Anderson ("I've Got You Under My Skin")
- Dr. Francis Angleman
- Benny, Mr. Bryce's bodyguard ("Guise Will Be Guise")
- Ilona Costa Bianchi ("The Girl in Question")
- The Biker Gang ("Dad")
- Billy's Kiddy League Coach ("Nightmares")
- Congressman Nathan Blim ("Billy")
- Brittany ("Harm's Way")
- Gib Cain ("Phases")
- Charlotte ("Harm's Way")
- Mr. Chaulk ("Untouched")
- Wilson Christopher and the Haxil's Cult Guys ("Expecting")
- Jacob Crane ("Unleashed")
- Cyril, W&H's mailboy ("Quickening")
- Danny ("Harm's Way")
- Debbie ("Salvage")
- Lee DeMarco ("The House Always Wins")
- Dick the Pimp ("Five by Five")
- Lenny Edwards ("War Zone")
- Elliot ("Ground State")
- Emil the Arms Dealer ("Lineage")
- Eric ("Some Assembly Required")
- Bret Folger ("Five by Five")
- Billy "Ford" Fordham ("Lie to Me")
- Frawley ("Homecoming")
- Corbin Fries ("Conviction")
- Frederick & Hans Gruenstalher and the Old Man ("Homecoming")
- Gunn's ex-crew: Rondell, Gio ("That Old Gang of Mine")
- Hank ("Parting Gifts")
- Fritz Heinrich (SS officer) ("Why We Fight")
- Henry, Deevak's human henchman ("First Impressions")
- Captain Daniel Holtz
- Holtz's Angel-hunters: Justine Cooper, Aubrey Jenkins
- Jack the Barkeeper ("Beer Bad")
- Jackson the Drug Dealer ("The Thin Dead Line")
- Desmond Keel ("Conviction")
- Knights of Byzantium: General Gregor, Orlando, Dante ("Checkpoint", "Blood Ties", "Spiral")
- Knox
- Irv Kraigle ("Dead End")
- Lenny the Stalker ("In the Dark")
- Rebecca Lowell ("Eternity")
- The Lunch Lady ("Earshot")
- Mac ("Parting Gifts")
- Lindsey McDonald
- The Maclay Family: Mr. Maclay, Donny and Beth ("Family")
- Colonel McNamara
- MacNamara Brothers: Darin and Jack ("The Ring")
- Coach Carl Marin ("Go Fish")
- Warren Mears
- Lee Mercer
- Dr. Michaels of Fairfield Clinic ("Dead End")
- Lilah Morgan
- Takeshi Morimoto ("Players")
- Bob Munroe, Sunnydale Chief of Police ("I Only Have Eyes for You")
- Linwood Murrow
- Novac ("Just Rewards")
- Gavin Park
- Patrice of the Order of Teraka ("What's My Line, Part Two")
- Preston ("Home")
- Ramone, Lanier's mole in Caritas ("Guise Will Be Guise")
- Nathan Reed ("Dead End")
- Monsigneur Rivali & the Inquisitore ("Offspring")
- Dr. Evan Royce ("Unleashed")
- Ruddy ("Harm's Way")
- Sam the Parole Officer ("Dead End")
- Lacey Shepherd ("Home")
- Fritz Siegel ("I, Robot... You, Jane")
- Oliver Simon ("Eternity")
- Rutherford Sirk ("Home")
- Dr. Sparrow
- Spencer, DeMarco's Head of Security ("The House Always Wins")
- Sunnydale cops ("Empty Places")
- The Faux T'ish Magev ("Guise Will Be Guise")
- The Trio - Warren Mears, technology expert; Andrew Wells, summoner of demons; and Jonathan Levinson, caster of spells.
- Tyke the Drug Dealer ("A New World")
- Professor Maggie Walsh
- Tom Warner ("Reptile Boy")
- Tucker Wells ("The Prom")
- Peter Wilder and the Avilas Cult ("Help")
- Wolfram & Hart Security Guards: Howard ("Blind Date"), Phillip ("Blind Date"), Allan ("Dead End"), Dwight ("Blood Money")
- Wolfram & Hart Special Ops Team: Commander Burke ("Quickening"), Agent Hauser ("Conviction"), Carlo ("Slouching Toward Bethlehem")

== Undead ==
- Adam
- Francis Angleman ("Primeval")
- Brian ("Provider")
- Daryl Epps ("Some Assembly Required")
- Forrest Gates ("Primeval")
- Inca Princess/Ampata Gutierrez ("Inca Mummy Girl")
- Josh ("Fear, Itself")
- Holland Manners
- Lilah Morgan
- Jack O'Toole and his gang: Bob, Dickie and Parker ("The Zeppo")
- Ovu Mobani zombies ("Dead Man's Party")
- Prof. Maggie Walsh ("Primeval")
- Wolfram & Hart Zombies ("Habeas Corpses")
- Wolfram & Hart Failsafe Zombie Guards ("You're Welcome")
- 23rd Precinct Zombie Cops ("The Thin Dead Line")

== Ghosts and spirits ==
- The First Slayer
- Hus and the Chumash Warrior Spirits ("Pangs")
- Poltergeist/Ghostly Spirits of the Orphans' Emotions ("Where the Wild Things Are")
- Grace Newman ("I Only Have Eyes for You")
- Matthias Pavayne, the Reaper ("Hell Bound")
- Pavayne's hell-sent Wolfram & Hart deceased employee apparitions ("Hell Bound")
- Dennis Pearson ("Rm w/a Vu")
- Maude Pearson ("Rm w/a Vu")
- The Puma Guide ("Intervention")
- Spirit Guides ("The Zeppo")
- James Stanley ("I Only Have Eyes for You")
- Tammy ("Birthday")
- Talisman Spectres ("Lessons")
- The Valet ("The Trial")
- Wraith ("Spin the Bottle")
- Wesley Wyndam-Pryce ("After the Fall")
- Lowell House Ghosts ("Where the Wild Things Are")

== Animalistic beings ==
- Nina Ash
- Buffy Summers (Beer Bad)
- Peter Clarner ("Beauty and the Beasts")
- Hyena people: Xander Harris, Kyle DuFours, Rhonda Kelley, Tor Hauer, Heidi Barrie, the zookeeper ("The Pack")
- MacManus ("Unleashed")
- The Neander-Guys: Colm, Kip, Hunt & Roy ("Beer Bad")
- Oz
- Veruca

== Deities and higher beings ==
- Beljoxa's Eye ("Showtime")
- The Conduit to the Powers That Be ("Birthday")
- Cordelia Chase (temporarily a higher power)
- Dinza, Dark Demi-Goddess of the Lost ("Ground State")
- First Evil
- Glorificus, a.k.a. Glory
- Hecate ("Bewitched, Bothered and Bewildered")
- Jasmine
- The Loa Alegba ("Loyalty")
- Mesekthet's replacement (the White Room's Panther) ("Home", "Hell Bound", "A Hole in the World")
- Osiris ("Bargaining, Part One)
- The Powers That Be
- The Ra-Tet: Mesektet, Manjet, Ashet, Semkhet and Ma'at ("Long Day's Journey")

== Magical creations ==
- Glory's Spawn of Sobek ("Shadow")
- Jonathan's Augmentation Monster ("Superstar")
- The Killer Clown ("Nightmares")
- Olaf the Troll ("Triangle")
- The Ugly Man ("Nightmares")
- Willow's Dirt Golems ("Grave")
- The Thaumogenesis Demon ("After Life")
- Roden's golems ("No Future for You")
- Dawn Summers

== Monsters ==
- The Bezoar ("Bad Eggs")
- Bug monsters ("Fredless")
- The 'Failsafe' ("You're Welcome")
- Natalie French/She-Mantis ("Teacher's Pet")
- The Lamprey Monster ("Doublemeat Palace")
- Quor-Toth Sluks ("The Price")
- Selminth Parasite ("Soul Purpose")
- Sunnydale High Swim Team/Gill Monsters ("Go Fish")
- Tentacle monster ("Sense & Sensitivity")

== Robots ==
- April ("I Was Made to Love You")
- Ted Buchanan ("Ted")
- Buffybot ("Intervention", "The Gift", "Bargaining, Part One", "Bargaining, Part Two")
- Cyborg Cell ("Lineage")
- Gwen, Wolfram & Hart's Files and Records ("Dad")
- Mecha Dawn ("Wolves at the Gate")
- Moloch the Corruptor ("I, Robot... You, Jane")
- Warrenbot ("Villains")

== Immortals and non-humans ==
- Drogyn the Battlebrand
- Eve, Child of the Senior Partners
- The Guardian ("End of Days")
- Marcus Hamilton, Child of the Senior Partners
- The Immortal ("The Girl in Question")
- The Oracles ("I Will Remember You")
- The Shrouded Shaman ("Enemies")
- Transuding Furies ("That Old Gang of Mine", "Offspring")
- The Tribunal ("Judgment")
- Wolfram & Hart's Prison Wardens: Zach, Trish, Ice-cream man, Mailman ("Underneath")

== Good supernatural beings ==
- Angel
- Buffy Summers
- Clem
- Charles Gunn ("After the Fall")
- Chinese herbalist demons ("That Vision Thing")
- Connor
- Cordelia Chase
- Dennis Pearson ("Rm w/a Vu")
- Allen Francis Doyle
- Drogyn the Battlebrand
- Faith
- Kendra
- Gwen Raiden
- Illyria (debatable, as she technically doesn't care about either good or evil, instead believing herself to be above everything)
- Kwaini Demon ("The Prodigal")
- Lorne
- Nina Ash
- Daniel "Oz" Osbourne
- The Powers That Be
- Sid the Dummy
- Slayers
- Spike (though some may argue that Spike was evil, Spike earned his soul back, thus becoming good)
- Dawn Summers
- Yarbnie demon ("That Old Gang of Mine")
