= Hell Bound (Angel) =

- Angel episode
- Episode no.: Season 5 Episode 4
- Directed by: Steven S. DeKnight
- Written by: Steven S. DeKnight
- Production code: 5ADH04
- Original air date: October 22, 2003

Guest appearances
- Sarah Thompson as Eve; Simon Templeman as Matthias Pavayne; Dorie Barton as Claire the Medium; Willow Geer as Glass Woman; Peter Kanetis as Lawyer #1; Judson Pearce Morgan as Bloody Lawyer; Elliott Gray as Hanging Man; Allison Barcott as Armless Woman

Episode chronology
← Previous "Unleashed"	Next → "Life of the Party"
- Angel season 5

"Hell Bound" is the 4th episode of the fifth season of the American television series Angel, originally broadcast on the WB network. It was the only Angel episode to carry a warning of graphic violence before it was first aired. In this episode, the spirit of Pavayne – a brutal surgeon who uses magic to send the loose spirits of Wolfram & Hart to Hell in his place – torments Spike. Fred invents a one-time use machine to make Spike corporeal, but Spike ends up pushing Pavayne into the machine to protect Fred.

== Plot ==
As Fred is working late in the science lab, Spike complains at how he cannot pick things up and scare people as a ghost. Fred argues that he is not a ghost, then notes that the temperature of the heat he radiates has dropped slightly. She promises again that she will not let him stay in the netherworld and will make him corporeal if she can defy some laws of nature. Spike disappears, winding up in the basement, where he hears a chopping sound and goes to investigate. He finds a man with a cut-up face chopping off his own fingers; he does a double take and the man disappears. Elsewhere in the building, Lorne negotiates a deal as he passes Fred. Fred heads to Wesley's office and requests some books. He tells her that he will get them for her if she agrees to have a real dinner, since she has been frequently eating takeout and working late. Eve takes Fred to Angel's office, where they discuss the amount of money Fred's department has been spending. Fred admits that she has to spend a lot to try to make Spike corporeal again; Angel says that he asked her to try to get him out of Wolfram & Hart. She reminds him that they were supposed to take over the firm to do good, but, of course, Angel says that that has nothing to do with Spike. Fred says that Spike is a champion, like Angel, but Angel has tired of the word "champion". She thinks that Spike would fight on their side if he could; Angel disagrees. He adds that the second he can, Spike is going to run off to Buffy. Fred thinks he is jealous and assures him that she is immune to Spike's charms - she just wants to help him. Angel replies that some people cannot be saved.

Spike reappears in the lab and notices a buzzing lamp and a looming shadow. As he heads down a hallway, the lights start going out and he hears a woman crying. He encounters a woman from the 19th century without arms; she disappears like the fingerless man. Upstairs, Spike meets up with Angel, who thinks that Spike is starting to feel how close he is to Hell. Spike says that it cannot be a big deal, since Angel managed to escape, but Angel says that he did not, he just got a reprieve. Spike says that Fred told him about the Shanshu Prophecy, which Angel says is not real because there is no such thing as destiny. He thinks that the evil things they did in the past are the only things that will wind up mattering. Spike asks why they should even bother to try to make good and Angel says they have no other choice. Spike suddenly sees a man hanging from the ceiling and realizes that Angel does not see him. Later, Angel, Spike, Wesley, and Fred meet up in Angel's office, where Spike tries to get the ghosts to go away. Gunn and Eve arrive and announce that, according to the building's "spectral sweeps", there are no ghosts. The ghosts tell Spike that something is coming as Spike begs Fred to do something to get rid of them. He disappears, then reappears, but no one can see him. The gang head off to look for Spike as a ghost tells him that no one can help him now. Spike spots the shadow from the lab again and follows it to the elevator, which starts moving on its own. Wesley, Gunn, and Fred head to Wesley's office, where they wonder if Spike is going crazy. Fred says that he is slipping further into Hell. Gunn and Wesley are not fazed by this and they both agree that that is where he is going. The elevator takes Spike to the basement, where ghosts tell him that the Reaper is coming for him. A woman with glass in her eye takes out a shard and cuts his cheek.

Up in the lab, Fred works on equations and is joined by Spike, who says that Hell is coming for him. He thanks her for trying to help him, despite the fact that she cannot hear him. He tries to touch her to encourage her; she feels a spark and determines that he is there. Angel arrives and Fred tells him that she thinks Spike is there. He replies that the mystics did another sweep of the building and did not find anything. Fred says she does not care and wants to figure out how to contact Spike before he is gone for good. The two of them meet up with Gunn and Wesley in a conference room, where they are joined by Eve and a psychic. The psychic conducts a quick séance, where she senses Spike's presence and says that he is in pain. She says that a "dark soul" is coming and Spike yells that it is the Reaper. The psychic starts choking and Angel thinks that Spike is attacking her. The psychic composes herself and appears to be okay, but then she explodes. Later, Wesley says that Spike would not gain anything from killing someone who was trying to help him; she must have contacted the "dark soul" she said was coming. As Fred showers in the lab, Spike wonders why the Reaper killed the psychic; he decides that it was trying to hide something. He reaches out and manages to touch the glass on the shower. He concentrates, writing something on the glass, and when Fred is done, she sees "REAPER" written on the glass. Suddenly, the glass shatters and Spike is yanked through a wall into the lobby. There, he is harassed by more ghosts and demands to see the Reaper himself. The Reaper - who is British and dressed like Jack the Ripper - appears and says that he is going to torture Spike. Up in Wesley's office, Gunn finds information on the "dark soul", but there are a lot of references to different people (four about Angel, who resents it because he didn't have a soul when he did them). Fred arrives and tells the others to cross-reference "reaper". Angel comes up with the name Matthias Pavayne, an 18th-century doctor nicknamed the Reaper for performing unnecessary surgery. Rather than praising him for being brutal, Wolfram & Hart killed him and used his blood to de-consecrate the ground of the L.A. branch; the site the seers had determined would work was originally a church, so Pavayne's blood was needed.

Angel notes that Pavayne practiced the dark arts, which is probably why he's not in Hell and can get around the mystics. Angel wonders why there aren't any ghosts in the building, since so many people have died there. Gunn says that Pavayne must be doing something to them, and Fred notes that Spike will probably be his next victim. Down in the science lab, Pavayne is having fun torturing Spike. Fred enters and Pavayne hopes that some day he'll get to deal with her. Spike fails to hit him since he is still non-corporeal. Spike and Pavayne wind up in the basement, where Pavayne brags that he can bend reality, which is why the gang cannot see Spike anymore. Pavayne and the ghosts taunt Spike, who says that Pavayne killed them all. Pavayne says that they died in service to the firm, but Spike says that he sent them to Hell, which means they are not really in the world. In the lab, Fred writes formulas on the whiteboard and then on the windows, and realizes that in order to save Spike, she and the others need a lot of dark energy. Gunn takes Angel to the white room, where Angel expositions that Gunn wants to take something from the conduit between Wolfram & Hart and other dimensions. They hear the panther and Gunn speaks to it calmly, eventually making a deal when it appears. Back in the basement, Pavayne continues torturing Spike and opens a portal to Hell. He says that he is sending Spike there so that he himself can stay in this world. He tells Spike that he is getting what he deserves; Spike agrees that he deserves to go to Hell, but not today. As Spike starts fighting back, he notes that since reality bends to desire, he could touch Fred and write on the glass because he wanted to, and he now wants to fight Pavayne. Spike starts hitting Pavayne, and they wind up in Angel's office; Pavayne fights back, appearing to enjoy himself.

The group meet up in the science lab again and Gunn gives Fred what he took from the panther. Fred does her thing as Spike and Pavayne keep fighting each other. They get distracted by an energy burst and Spike runs away. In the lab, Fred determines that Spike is there and tells him to step into a circle she has drawn so that he can become corporeal again. Pavayne grabs her and starts choking her. The others figure it out and try to fight him, but he knocks them across the room. Pavayne notes that Spike can choose to become corporeal or he can save Fred. Spike appears beside him and knocks him into the circle, where Pavayne becomes corporeal. Angel starts fighting him and Spike, now visible to the gang, tells him not to kill Pavayne; Angel is fine with just beating him up. The next day, Wesley and Gunn help Fred clean up the lab and try to make sure she is okay. Spike appears in Fred's office and she apologizes for being unable to do the ritual again to make him corporeal. He says that he is all right - he made the choice to save her instead and would not change his mind. He is afraid of trying something else and winding up like Pavayne, who cheated death any way he could no matter who it hurt. Fred says what she told everyone else was right - Spike was worth saving. Spike shows off his ability to bend reality to his desire by picking up a coffee mug, reflecting that there are worse things than being a ghost. In the basement, Angel and Eve imprison Pavayne in a device where he cannot move or affect anything around him, but will remain alive for all eternity in Hell, staring at an empty hallway through the window in his door.
