= Dead End (Angel) =

- Angel episode
- Episode no.: Season 2 Episode 18
- Directed by: James A. Contner
- Written by: David Greenwalt
- Production code: 2ADH18
- Original air date: April 24, 2001

Guest appearances
- Christian Kane as Lindsey McDonald; Stephanie Romanov as Lilah Morgan; Andy Hallett as The Host; Gerry Becker as Nathan Reed; Michael Dempsey as Irv Kraigle; Mik Scriba as Parole Officer; Meagan Thomas as Young Lawyer #1; Ted Broden as Young Lawyer #2; Dennis Gersten as Dr. Michaels; Kavita Patil as Nurse; Pete Gardner as Joseph Kramer; Stephanie Nash as Wife; Steven DeRelian as Bradley Scott

Episode chronology
← Previous "Disharmony"	Next → "Belonging"
- Angel season 2

"Dead End" is the 18th episode of the second season of the American television series Angel. Written by David Greenwalt and directed by James A. Contner, it was originally broadcast on April 24, 2001 on the WB television network. In "Dead End", Lindsey receives a new hand from Wolfram & Hart, which appears to have an evil agenda of its own. Angel and Lindsey independently discover that Wolfram & Hart forcefully removes limbs from people to obtain transplants, and work together to destroy the clinic responsible. Disillusioned, Lindsey leaves Los Angeles.

== Plot ==
Lindsey McDonald wakes up and goes about his daily routine of getting washed, affixing his prosthetic hand and getting ready for work. As he removes a shirt with a pre-knotted tie from his wardrobe he cannot help but look at his guitar, now lonely and unplayed. Meanwhile, a man and his family go about their morning business before the wife and kids rush off to their destinations. The man follows moments later, picks up a large kitchen knife, and stabs it in his eye. After Cordelia gets a nasty vision about this; the team splits up to call hospitals, check out morgues and the streets for any information on the man from Cordelia's vision.

Lindsey and Lilah speak with their boss, Nathan Reed, about their upcoming reevaluation. Later, Nathan privately tells Lindsey that he made a surprise doctor's appointment for him. At the Fairfield Clinic, Lindsey learns from the doctor that Wolfram & Hart has arranged for him to get a new, live hand. During the procedure, a Pockla demon is brought in to perform a brief ritual and complete the attachment of the hand to Lindsey, leaving only a little scar. The next day, Lindsey wakes up, enjoying his new hand. While getting ready, he notices his guitar again, but this time picks it up and plays. Later at the office, Lilah notices Lindsey's new hand and grows very nervous about her job since Wolfram & Hart spent so much money on her "partner". During their meeting with a client, Lindsey impresses the client, but abruptly leaves the meeting when he looks down and notices his new hand has written "kill" on a legal pad several times.

At the office, Angel has a wide assortment of food delivered as he wanted to surprise Cordelia for lunch. She appreciates it, and, as she leaves, she remembers from her vision that the man was happy about his eye before he stabbed it, like it was "new". Wesley and Gunn discover the man, Joseph Kramer, was transferred overseas. Having reached a dead end, the gang is forced to go to Caritas. On stage, they are shocked and impressed to find Lindsey singing and playing guitar with the audience completely mesmerized by his musical ability. Lorne informs them that Lindsey and Angel need to work together to solve the case, much to both men's chagrin.

Based on the fact that Lindsey got a new hand and Kramer a new eye, it is concluded that somewhere body part transplants are being done. At Wolfram & Hart, Lindsey sneaks into Nathan's office to look up information on Fairfield Clinic, where he got the transplant. He later spots Lilah stealing files. Angel discovers information on Lindsey's hand, finding that it belonged to a Bradley Scott, a former employee of Wolfram & Hart who served time in prison and was recently paroled. Lindsey visits a parole officer for information about the clinic, but the man gets violent when Lindsey does not know the code. Before the man can shoot Lindsey in the head, Angel arrives and saves him. Holding the officer by a rope around his neck, Angel demands information.

Wesley and Gunn worry about Cordelia as she seems to be suffering from the visions for as long as the problem remains. Angel and Lindsey head for a building as Angel confirms their location with the parole officer tied up in the trunk. Angel and Lindsey take care of the security guards inside then they head downstairs through a trap door to the place where the body parts are harvested. Lindsey spots Bradley Scott, the former owner of Lindsey's new hand, muttering "kill". Lindsey asks who he wants him to kill, and Bradley responds with a simple "kill me". As Lindsey obliges the request, Angel saves those still fully intact and Lindsey kills the rest before the building is blown up.

At Wolfram & Hart, Lindsey takes full advantage of his new "evil" hand. He knows he was the one chosen to take over, but he suggests Lilah take the job as he has got other issues to deal with. Lindsey encounters Angel outside by his truck and reluctantly talks to him, telling Angel he is leaving Los Angeles to find himself. He also advises Angel to fight against Wolfram & Hart's control.

== Production ==
Christian Kane recalls the scene in which he and Angel are driving to the Wolfram & Hart clinic as another of his favorite moments from his time on the series. "When we're driving in the car, it was five o'clock in the morning, the sun was getting ready to come up and it was the last shot of the day and it's colder than shit," he jokingly recalls. "We're in a convertible car and it was so easy. It's very easy to act with him and it's really not a big scene but it was just me and David. Five o'clock, very tired, very cold and we're driving in this car and we got it done. There was a lot of dialogue and there were a lot of emotions going on in that time and it was very simple."

"L.A. Song", the song Lindsey sings at Caritas, was written by actor Christian Kane and producer David Greenwalt. The guitar was recorded with Steve Carlson playing, but Kane is actually singing.
