= Dad (Angel) =

- Angel episode
- Baby Connor
- Episode no.: Season 3 Episode 10
- Directed by: Fred Keller
- Written by: David H. Goodman
- Production code: 3ADH10
- Original air date: December 10, 2001

Guest appearances
- John Rubinstein as Linwood Murrow; Andy Hallett as Lorne; Stephanie Romanov as Lilah Morgan; Daniel Dae Kim as Gavin Park; Jack Conley as Sahjhan; Laurel Holloman as Justine Cooper; Keith Szarabajka as Daniel Holtz; Kira Tirimacco as Doctor; Stephanie Courtney as Gwen

Episode chronology
← Previous "Lullaby"	Next → "Birthday"
- Angel season 3

"Dad" is the 10th episode of the third season of the American television series Angel. After Darla sacrifices herself to save her baby, Angel takes the newborn back to the hotel where he tries to be a good father to his child. But Angel and the gang's problems multiply when they are trapped at the hotel by several groups of enemies, including vampire cults, demon cults and satanic humans, bent on kidnapping his infant son. After brushing off Sahjhan, Holtz goes about Los Angeles recruiting new help for his quest to kill Angel by hiring humans whose families were also victims of vampires, starting with one bitter, working-class woman, named Justine Cooper, as his right-hand person and recruiter.

== Plot ==
The gang returns with the baby after purchasing supplies for him to find the hotel a mess. Lorne announces he'll be moving in on account of Caritas being destroyed yet again. Although everyone adores the baby and wants to hold him, Angel is paternally attached to his son and holds him possessively, keeping everyone at bay. Angel struggles with parental duty when he cleans a cut on his son's face, while the rest of the gang plan to keep the baby safe from the inevitable attackers looking to steal and kill him. A demon barges into the hotel but is quickly killed by Gunn and Wesley while Angel shields the baby from the violence. Angel realizes his son is crying because he needs to be changed and attempts to change the diaper on Wesley's desk. Back at the underground lair, Sahjhan complains about Holtz's refusal to kill Angel, but Holtz is content with his behavior. They discuss Darla's pregnancy and suicide, and Holtz goes on about his plans despite Sahjhan's insistence that Angel just be staked quickly to stick with the prophecies. Sahjhan's temper rises as he discovers that Holtz poisoned all of his hired demon minions. Holtz explains he doesn't need mercenaries but soldiers who believe in his cause.

While the Furies set up a mystical barrier around the Hyperion Hotel, Angel continues to care for his fussy child and Cordelia and Fred investigate the demon websites offering bounties for the baby. Cordelia informs Angel that the newborn needs to see a doctor, and that he can't do everything for his child - for example, be outside in the sun - and needs to accept their help.

While watching the hotel via their spy cameras, the lawyers at Wolfram & Hart ponder how Angel's baby could have been born despite the prophecy's translation stating it would not happen (Lilah explains that because Darla staked herself, leaving the baby, that the child was "from his mother's womb untimely ripped"). Meanwhile, Angel can't get his son to stop crying until he changes to his vampire visage, which fascinates the baby enough to stop him from crying before Angel playfully makes silly noises to him, and thus provides the baby the attention he desires from him. In attempts to discover Holtz's identity, Lilah has "Files and Records," a W&H employee with near-infinite total recall, retrieve information about how Angelus and Darla killed Holtz's entire family back in the 18th century. Holtz tracks a young woman named Justine, whose twin sister was killed by a vampire six months before. She had been killing vampires on her own since then, and Holtz offers to be her mentor.

Gunn returns with weapons and news of the crowd forming outside waiting to break the barrier and claim the child. The Lilliad demons outside chant and break down the barrier around the hotel while inside, the gang prepares to defend themselves and retreat if necessary. Angel decides to leave with the baby, as Wolfram & Hart watch on television screens. They send their teams out to get the baby from him. The gang ready themselves for the attack as the barrier is broken down and demons are free to enter. Angel escapes through the sewers and drives away in his car. While the gang disposes of the demons and vampires who enter the hotel with a flame-thrower, Angel drives to an abandoned mine shaft. His pursuers demand the child, and surprisingly Angel throws it to them as he escapes to the surface. The demons unwrap the child to find that it's actually a teddy bear with a ticking time bomb strapped to it - the bomb destroys them and the mine shaft, as Cordelia, Wesley and Fred take the baby to the hospital for care.

At Wolfram & Hart, Linwood examines footage from the hotel and discovers a moment when Lorne slipped Angel a note into his coat and in the conversation, identifies a location where Angel could read the note without being seen by the cameras. Earlier, Lorne heard a humming noise and concluded that the gang was being spied upon. The vampire alarm goes off, and Angel barges in and attacks Linwood with a knife, giving him a cut equal to the one on his child's cheek. Angel promises that any harm that comes to his son will be equally repaid to Linwood. As appointed "godfather," Linwood is given the job of keeping everyone and everything away from the vampire's child unless he looks forward to revenge at Angel's hands; in addition, he threatens Linwood for his son's college funds; Angel hopes to see his son graduate at University of Notre Dame. At the hospital, the doctors report that the baby is healthy, and Angel shows up in time to announce the name of his son, Connor. Gunn arrives with a stroller, and the gang head home where they hope to be safe for a while.

== Production ==
Angel's son Connor - a traditional Irish name meaning 'counsellor' - is played by a set of identical triplets, Connor Hanley, Jake Matthew and Trenton Lee Tupen, so that no individual baby would have to be on set for too long. They were born on August 9, 2001, at Los Robles Hospital & Medical Center to Julie and Matt Tupen.
