= The Shroud of Rahmon =

- Angel episode
- Episode no.: Season 2 Episode 8
- Directed by: David Grossman
- Written by: Jim Kouf
- Production code: 2ADH08
- Original air date: November 21, 2000

Guest appearances
- Elisabeth Röhm as Kate Lockley; W. Earl Brown as Menlo; Tony Todd as Vyasa; Dwayne L. Barnes as Lester; R. Emery Bright as Detective Turlock; Tom Kiesche as Detective Broomfield; Robert Dolan as Bob; Michael Nagy as Jay-Don; Jim Hanna as Surveillance Cop #1; Danny Ricardo as First Cop

Episode chronology
← Previous "Darla"	Next → "The Trial"
- Angel season 2

"The Shroud of Rahmon" is the eighth episode of the second season of the American television series Angel. Written by Jim Kouf and directed by David Grossman, it was originally broadcast on November 21, 2000 on the WB network. In this episode, Angel and Charles Gunn go undercover as part of a group of demonic thieves in order to foil the theft of a demonic burial shroud at a museum, unaware that the garment has supernatural mind-altering properties.

== Plot ==
Two detectives interrogate Wesley about an attempted murder. Wesley tells them everything just went very wrong. Without revealing the vampire's name, Wesley explains disjointedly that Angel was not supposed to be there, that Wesley would have stopped him if they had "found out sooner".

Earlier, Wesley stops by the Hyperion and talks with Cordelia. They go to a movie premiere together, while Angel and Gunn meet with Gunn's cousin, Lester, who asked for their help. Lester is supposed to be a driver for a demonic robbery, but he wants nothing to do with it. A vampire Angel knows by reputation, Jay-Don, is being brought in to help. To Gunn's dismay, Angel takes charge of the case and tells Gunn he will handle it by himself. Angel returns to the hotel and finds Kate in his room. She wants information on Darla and despite the cross she carries, Angel is not threatened and warns her to back off before she is killed. Angel meets Jay-Don at the bus station and kills him, taking his place on the robbery. A demon named Menlow meets with Angel, who he thinks is Jay-Don, and takes him to the others. Another demon, Vyasa, and a human security guard, Bob, are already present, waiting for Lester. Gunn shows up in Lester's place. Angel is annoyed that Gunn did not listen to him, but cannot do anything about it without blowing their cover.

The robbery team runs over the plan, explaining that they will be stealing the Shroud of Rahmon. Jay-don - now Angel - is there to get past sensors that detect changes in body heat. Angel, trying to get a chance to talk privately with Gunn, picks a fight with him, but the others stop him before he can get outside.

Cordelia researches museums to find which one may be the location of the robbery, learning the Natural History Museum of Los Angeles temporarily contains the Shroud of Rahmon, intended to prevent the insanity-creating Rahmon from being resurrected. Instead, the shroud absorbed the power to make people around it insane. Meanwhile, the thieves break into the museum. Angel tries to keep Gunn outside, but the others insist he come in. They break into the vault holding the shroud, where the Shroud's presence begins to cause the group to act erratically. Wesley and Cordelia enter the building and are immediately affected as well. The robbery group carries the consecrated box with the enclosed shroud on a path out of the building, becoming more violent towards each other. Vyasa kills Bob by ripping off his head. Wesley encounters Kate at the building and has trouble keeping focused on his mission to help Angel. Wesley finds Angel and tries to warn him about the shroud.

Kate finds Angel and the others and pulls a gun on them. Angel knocks her gun out of the way and bites her neck, and she falls to the ground, motionless. A police team arrives and finds Wesley leaning over Kate's body. The shroud box is carried to another building and the shroud's effect on the group leads them all to fight over it, breaking the box open and grabbing the shroud. Gunn and Angel play tug of war with the shroud until Angel manages to come to his senses enough to convince Gunn to let go. After taking the shroud outside and dousing it in alcohol, Angel sets it aflame, stopping its effects.

In the interrogation room, the detectives are convinced that Wesley is the killer. As they are about to arrest him, Kate shows up and tells them to let him go. She remembers that Angel did bite her briefly, but it was actually a ruse to prevent her from being killed by the demons. Wesley and Cordelia think about what happened, and Wesley worries that Angel's bloodlust has been reawakened by the taste of human blood. Angel sits in his room, his thoughts focused on biting Kate.

== Reception ==
This episode was nominated for "Best Special Makeup Effects in a Series" at the Hollywood Makeup Artist and Hair Stylist Guild Awards.
