= Guise Will Be Guise =

- Angel episode
- Episode no.: Season 2 Episode 6
- Directed by: Krishna Rao
- Written by: Jane Espenson
- Production code: 2ADH06
- Original air date: November 7, 2000

Guest appearances
- Andy Hallett as The Host; Art LaFleur as T'ish Magev; Brigid Brannagh as Virginia Bryce; Patrick Kilpatrick as Paul Lanier; Todd Susman as Magnus Bryce; Danica Sheridan as Yeska; Saul Stein as Benny; Frankie Jay Allison as Thug #1; Michael Yama as Japanese Man #1; Eiji Inoue as Japanese Man #2; Ed Trotta as Man

Episode chronology
← Previous "Dear Boy"	Next → "Darla"
- Angel season 2

"Guise Will Be Guise" is the 6th episode of the second season of the American television series Angel. Written by Jane Espenson and directed by Krishna Rao, it was originally broadcast on November 7, 2000 on the WB network. In "Guise Will Be Guise", Angel seeks out the guidance of a swami, while Wesley is forced to impersonate Angel when a powerful businessman demands that Angel guard his daughter Virginia. However, the swami is an impostor trying to keep Angel away from Los Angeles so that one of Virginia's father's competitors can capture her. He wants to do this so she can't be ritually sacrificed, which would give her father great power.

== Plot ==
Angel tries to hunt down Darla at Wolfram & Hart, but Cordelia and Wesley stop him. Angel consults the demon Host at the karaoke bar Caritas, who refers him to Swami T'ish Magev for help. Cordelia and Wesley hold down the office while Angel is away, both glad that he is seeking help to calm his obsession with Darla.

At the office, a thug holds Cordelia at gunpoint, demanding to see Angel, and Wesley is forced to pose as their vampire boss in order to save her. Magnus Bryce, a shrewd and rich businessman, is in need of Angel's services to protect his daughter from assassins from a rival corporation fronted by Paul Lanier. He offers Wesley blood that he forces down, to keep from ruining his cover. Wesley meets Mr. Bryce's daughter, Virginia, and then the two go shopping. Virginia and Wesley talk about how she wants freedom from the prison her father's created for her, then the two kiss. Virginia initially stops, believing Angel's curse is an obstacle, but Wesley claims it is more of a 'recommendation' than anything else — and the two have sex.

Meanwhile, at a quiet cabin, Angel talks with the normal-looking Swami about his choice of clothing, style of car, and brand of hair gel. The Swami advises Angel to find a blond woman and break her heart, so he will feel better about his situation with Darla. Later, the Swami talks to Paul Lanier over the phone, revealing that he's an imposter (one of the bartenders at Caritas overheard Angel and the Host's conversation and tipped Lanier off about Angel's destination). Through their conversation, in which they both believe Angel is with them, they deduce that Wesley is not Angel. Lanier informs Bryce that there is a fake protecting Virginia - a bodyguard who is able to have sex with his virgin daughter.

Gunn sets off to find Angel, but, when he arrives at the cabin, the fake swami knocks him out. Angel witnesses this and uses a fishing pole to pull the man out of the sun and into his grasp. Cordelia arrives at the Bryce home, but before she can rescue Wesley, Virginia finds out that he's not really Angel. In order to get a significant amount of power from a demon, Bryce plans to sacrifice his daughter as the demon will grant immense power to anyone who sacrifices a virgin on their 50th birthday (hence why Bryce chose Angel to be her bodyguard, as the curse would have prevented the two from having sex). Angel and Wesley conclude that Lanier was trying to prevent the sacrifice so that Bryce wouldn't get the power. Bryce starts the sacrificial ritual, but Angel and crew interrupt. The demon appears, but won't take Virginia as a sacrifice because she is not a virgin. Furious about her father's actions, Virginia punches him and disassociates herself from him, revealing that she hasn't been a virgin since she was sixteen. After reading an article in a magazine, both Cordelia and Angel are jealous that Wesley is getting so much publicity as Virginia's bodyguard.

== Production ==
Alexis Denisof enjoyed playing Angel in this episode, although when the BBC asked him what the props team used for the fake blood he had to drink, he was unsure. "I should find out," he says. "I haven’t been feeling well ever since."
