= To Shanshu in L.A. =

- Angel episode
- Episode no.: Season 1 Episode 22
- Directed by: David Greenwalt
- Written by: David Greenwalt
- Production code: 1ADH22
- Original air date: May 23, 2000

Guest appearances
- Julie Benz as Darla; Elisabeth Röhm as Kate Lockley; Christian Kane as Lindsey McDonald; Stephanie Romanov as Lilah Morgan; Sam Anderson as Holland Manners; Todd Stashwick as Vocah Demon; Carey Cannon as Female Oracle; Randall Slavin as Male Oracle; David Herman as David Nabbit; J. August Richards as Charles Gunn; Louise Claps as Homeless Woman; Daren Rice as Uniform #1; Jon Ecklund as Uniform #2; Lia Johnson as Vendor; Robyn Cohen as Nurse; Susan Savage as Doctor; John Eddins as Monk #1; Gerard O'Donnell as Monk #2; Brahman Turner as Young Tough Guy

Episode chronology
← Previous "Blind Date"	Next → "Judgment"
- Angel season 1

"To Shanshu in L.A." is the 22nd episode of the first season of the American television series Angel. Written and directed by David Greenwalt, it was the Season One finale, and originally broadcast on May 23, 2000 on the WB network. In this episode, Wolfram & Hart lawyers send a demon named Vocah to reclaim the mystical scroll Angel stole from them, which is needed to raise the Beast. Angel eventually takes back the scroll (by severing Lindsey's hand) but fails to prevent the ritual in time. Meanwhile, Wesley translates the Shanshu Prophecy, and discovers that it means Angel will become human, after he fulfills his destiny. At the end of the episode it is revealed that the Beast is in fact Darla, Angel's sire.

== Plot ==
Wesley continues to try to decipher the text of The Prophecies of Aberjian (part of which is the Shanshu Prophecy). When he deciphers the crucial word "shanshu" as "death", he surmises that means Angel will die. The lawyers at Wolfram & Hart call forth a warrior of the underworld named Vocah to perform a Raising. Vocah learns that the scroll containing the prophecy is in Angel's possession and sets off to retrieve it. Cordelia has a vision that sends Angel on his way to help a homeless woman fighting a slime demon. Kate arrives on the scene after Angel has defeated it, and declares she is determined to rid the city of vampires.

The next morning, Wesley and Cordelia discuss Angel's ability to change and grow, and Cordelia decides he needs a hobby. Vocah, after killing the Oracles of The Powers That Be, follows Cordelia, and inundates her with hundreds upon hundreds of visions; she collapses to the ground in agony. Angel reads up on the scrolls while the cloaked figure makes his way into the apartment. Angel locks the scroll away, and then leaves after getting a call about Cordelia. At the hospital, Cordelia is suffering, and the doctors are unable to save her. Angel is horrified by what is happening to his friend. Wesley returns to the apartment just in time to see a bomb was left in place of the scroll. Angel approaches the office building just as it explodes into a fiery blaze. Angel searches through the wreckage and finds that Wesley is still alive but badly hurt. Kate confronts Angel, but with his friends in serious condition, he refuses to take any of her hostile attitude toward him and goes with Wesley to the hospital.

Angel goes to see Cordelia, now in a catatonic state. He then notices a symbol on Cordelia's hand, and goes to the Oracles for help. He finds them dead, but the spirit of the female Oracle gives him instruction. He needs the scrolls, specifically the words of Anatole, to save Cordelia. She points him in the direction of Wolfram & Hart. Refusing to leave his friends unprotected again, Angel asks Gunn to stand guard at the hospital while he goes to hunt down Vocah. Vocah reads from the scrolls while sacrificing five vampires that are chained to a large cage. Angel watches as the Wolfram & Hart lawyers leave to attend the raising ritual.

Angel crashes the party and goes into a battle with Vocah. Lindsey picks up where Vocah left off and continues the ritual. His chanting kills the five vampires chained to the cage and then Holland orders the cage removed. In the end, Angel kills Vocah, and then faces Lindsey for the scroll. Lindsey tells Angel that the key to defeating the vampire with a soul is to cut off his connections to the Powers That Be and starts to burn the scroll. However rather than let Cordelia's only hope burn, Angel cuts off Lindsey's right hand and retrieves the scroll.

Wesley reads the words of Anatole and Cordelia is released from Vocah's curse. After seeing so many visions, Cordelia realizes how many people out there need their help and she and Angel vow to help them. At her apartment (and the temporary headquarters for Angel Investigations), Cordelia feeds Wesley and Angel, showing them her new, kinder side. Wesley discovers that the prophecy means that Angel will become human once he has fulfilled his duties. The lawyers go check on the cage, and Lilah looks inside, revealing a terrified Darla.
