= Ground State (Angel) =

- Angel episode
- Episode no.: Season 4 Episode 2
- Directed by: Michael Grossman
- Written by: Mere Smith
- Production code: 4ADH02
- Original air date: October 13, 2002

Guest appearances
- Stephanie Romanov as Lilah Morgan; Alexa Davalos as Gwen Raiden; Rena Owen as Dinza; Tom Irwin as Elliot; Belinda Waymouth as Ms. Lydia Thorpe; Heidi Fecht as Mrs. Raiden; Michael Medico as Mr. Raiden; Jessica M. Kiper as Nick; Easton Gage as Young Boy; Megan Corletto as Young Gwen

Episode chronology
← Previous "Deep Down"	Next → "The House Always Wins"
- Angel season 4

"Ground State" is the second episode of the fourth season of the American television series Angel. In this episode, Wesley, now a hardened demon-hunter/killer with his own gang, leads the search to Dinza who tells them that the Axis talisman will aid him in their search for Cordelia. Meanwhile, Gwen Raiden, a young mercenary with uncontrollable electrical abilities, is also looking for the talisman at the request of her employer, a wealthy businessman with connections to Wolfram & Hart.

== Plot ==
In Wisconsin, 1985, a young girl named Gwen is dropped off at Thorpe Academy by her parents. Tightly wrapped up in thick clothes Gwen is discouraged from touching and finds it difficult to fit in with the other children. When a young boy approaches her at recess and offers her a toy car, she makes the mistake of touching him and shocking the boy with a fatal bolt of electricity.

At Cordelia's apartment, Fred packs up Cordy's things because they can't afford to keep paying the rent. As Wesley and his gang fights off two large demons, Angel arrives and tries to thank Wesley for rescuing him, and to recant his promise never to forgive him for stealing Connor. Wesley however isn't interested in Angel's apologies. Wesley thinks Cordy is still alive, but in another dimension.

Gwen, now a young woman, waltzes into a restaurant dressed in red leather, drawing the attention of all the men. She meets a businessman named Elliot, who wants Gwen to steal the Axis for his personal collection.

Fred gives a presentation that explains the Axis of Pythia allows the user to see any person in the countless dimensions; her drawings are overshadowed by Angel's artistic abilities. They learn the Axis is located at an auction house with extensive security and gather the equipment they'll need while elsewhere, Gwen gets ready to steal the Axis herself.

Lilah and Wesley share some small talk about work while they romp around his apartment together. Gwen expertly makes her way into the building where the Axis is held but only a short distance behind her, Angel, Gunn and Fred break into the building as well. Angel checks out the vault, but laser beams block his entrance and then a gate is dropped, completely blocking his path. Gwen drops down from the ceiling and manipulates the beams out of her way. While Angel questions who she is and her intentions, she steals the Axis and prepares to leave. Gunn shows up to help Angel while Fred triggers an alarm that encourages Gwen's fast retreat. Once the gate has been lifted out of the way, Gunn tries to grab Gwen before she gets away and instead is struck with a fatal blow by Gwen. Guilt-ridden at the thought of killing yet another innocent person, Gwen knocks Angel and a grieving Fred out of the way and shock-starts Gunn's heart.

Later, Angel runs into Lilah while looking over Connor, who's now living outdoors with a bunch of homeless people. Angel threatens her into telling him which Wolfram & Hart client is buying the Axis of Pythia from Gwen. Gunn rests up in bed while Fred releases her feelings about the overwhelming elements of her life - Gunn's brief death and her constant responsibilities in the gang - as she yells at Gunn and finally breaks down into tears.

Angel finds Gwen on the way to deliver the Axis and the two fight. Gwen repeatedly tries to shock Angel to death, which causes his heart to beat for a moment and the two kiss. Both are surprised by the sudden life to Angel's heart and then bars cover the elevator doorway and Elliot shows up. He explains that because of her terrible theft job, she has to be killed. He had the elevator changed so that Gwen could have no access to an electrical charge that would allow her to escape when the elevator is filled with gas.

Once the door closes, Gwen struggles not to inhale while Angel punches a hole through a thick plastic wall until Gwen can reach the wires and the two are able to escape. Angel fights with Elliot's lackeys while Gwen focuses her attention on Elliot. Angel stops her from killing him and then she lets him have the Axis. Back at the hotel, one of the rooms glows a bright gold while Gunn and Fred wait impatiently outside the closed door. Angel exits the room, leaving a still slightly glowing Axis behind him. The three sit around the lobby and talk about what Angel saw and try to deal with her new role. Meanwhile, high up in the heavens, Cordelia watches over the three and shouts at them to free her from her "higher" life.

== Production details ==
Actress Alexa Davalos says she had "5 minutes of training" from stunt coordinator Mike Massa right before filming the fight scene with Angel.

Tammy Kinsey comments on the cinematic experimentation in this episode, beginning with the close-up of Cordelia's eye that is reminiscent of the 1977 film Powers of Ten. Abbott says that the zoom-out at the end of the episode from the hotel to a cityscape to Cordelia "suggests the value of shifting frames of reference. Here we see the world of the story as viewers and the visual comprehension of a Higher Power simultaneously."
