= Birthday (Angel) =

- Angel episode
- Episode no.: Season 3 Episode 11
- Directed by: Michael Grossman
- Written by: Mere Smith
- Production code: 3ADH11
- Original air date: January 14, 2002

Guest appearances
- Andy Hallett as Lorne; David Denman as Skip; Patrick Breen as Nevin; Max Baker as Hotel Clerk; Heather Weeks as Tammy; Aimee Garcia as Cynthia

Episode chronology
← Previous "Dad"	Next → "Provider"
- Angel season 3

"Birthday" is the eleventh episode of the third season of the American television series Angel. Written by Mere Smith and directed by Michael Grossman, it was originally broadcast on January 14, 2002 on the WB network. In "Birthday", Cordelia has a precognitive vision so painful that she goes into a coma. She is met by a demon guide who allows her to go back in time and choose a different path, so that she can avoid becoming afflicted with the visions that are killing her. Although in this alternate timeline Cordelia is a successful sitcom actress, she decides to accept the visions once again so that she can help people.

== Plot ==
During Cordelia's 21st birthday celebration at the Hyperion Hotel, Cordelia experiences a vision so painful that she is rendered unconscious. Fred and Gunn find Cordelia's prescription pain pills and the results of a CAT scan that reveals severe brain damage – Cordelia is dying. When Cordelia wakes, no one can see or hear her and she concludes that she has been knocked into an astral state. A friendly demon called Skip (the one that used to guard Billy) introduces himself as her guide, and says the visions which Doyle gave her were never intended for a human and that they are killing her. Skip tells Cordelia that she could have become a famous actress had she not reconnected with Angel at the party where she first ran into him. Skip offers her two options: go back in time and choose a different path, or return to her body and die when the next vision strikes.

Skip brings Cordelia to witness Angel demanding that the Powers That Be take back her visions to save her life. When Cordelia overhears Angel call her "weak", she is hurt and agrees to Skip's offer to rewrite her destiny. She is instantly transported to a luxurious life where she is an Emmy award-winning actress and the star of her own television show. However, she is haunted by the name of the Hyperion Hotel, and heads over there after the show wraps. She makes her way up to the room she recognizes as Angel's, which triggers her memory of the vision that knocked her unconscious earlier – a young girl in danger. She goes to the girl's house, Cynthia, who confesses she was trying to use magic. A demon materializes, and they try to defend themselves, until a one-armed Wesley and Gunn burst in to kill the demon. When Cordelia explains what has happened, they take her to see Angel, who – in this timeline – inherited Doyle's visions instead of Cordelia, which appear to have driven Angel insane, mostly because Cordelia was not there to help him. However, depressed and saddened by her friend in such a horrific state, Cordelia takes the visions back by kissing Angel.

Skip appears, reminding her of their deal. He argues it is the fate she chose and that it is not easy to shake it off. Cordelia disagrees, saying she is too valuable to the Powers. Skip then offers to stop the visions from killing her as a human by turning her into a half-demon, allowing her to handle the visions more safely, which she accepts. When Cordelia wakes up, she has another vision – and to everyone's astonishment, she experiences no pain. The demon aspect becomes clear when Angel points out that Cordelia has accidentally begun levitating.

== Production details ==
The theme song to Cordelia's television show Cordy! was written and sung by executive producers Marti Noxon and David Greenwalt, who also sang in the Buffy musical episode "Once More, with Feeling". A 7-minute excerpt of Cordy! was filmed on the redressed set of Dharma & Greg, to give it a "true sitcom feel". Producer Tim Minear explains, "When you look at Charisma Carpenter, she does bear a resemblance to Mary Tyler Moore and she's so funny, and we all sort of had this fetish fantasy of seeing her on a brightly lit sitcom stage with people laughing at her jokes." However, the scene "wasn't quite as funny as we wanted it to be," admitted Mere Smith, and so all but the opening credits were ultimately cut from the final episode, although the clip is available as a Deleted Scene on the DVD release.

"People are insane for Skip", says David Greenwalt of the enormous fan reaction after Skip was introduced in "That Vision Thing", which is why his character was brought back to be Cordelia's guide in this episode. David Denman, the actor who plays Skip, says that when Charisma Carpenter told him how excited she was to work with him "I thought she was kidding with me."
