= Quickening (Angel) =

- Angel episode
- Episode no.: Season 3 Episode 8
- Directed by: Skip Schoolnik
- Written by: Jeffrey Bell
- Production code: 3ADH08
- Original air date: November 12, 2001

Guest appearances
- Julie Benz as Darla; John Rubinstein as Linwood Murrow; Stephanie Romanov as Lilah Morgan; Daniel Dae Kim as Gavin Park; Jack Conley as Sahjhan; Keith Szarabajka as Daniel Holtz; Jose Yenque as Vampire Leader; Matt Casper as Cyril; Bronwen Bonner-Davies as Caroline Holtz; Michael Robert Brandon as Psychic; William Ostrander as Commander; Kasha Kropinski as Sarah Holtz; John Durbin as Dr. Fetvanovich; Angelo Surmelis as Tech Guy

Episode chronology
← Previous "Offspring"	Next → "Lullaby"
- Angel season 3

"Quickening" is the 8th episode of the third season of the American television series Angel.

== Plot ==
In York, England, 1764, Holtz pursues Angelus and Darla, following a trail they left for him. Meanwhile, Angelus and Darla make their way into the Holtzs' house and kill his wife and two children. Holtz arrives at his house, but the vampires are gone and his family is dead. In the present, Angel visits Darla as she sleeps in his room, dreading yet maintaining hope that their child is not evil. Holtz learns about the present day through numerous television screens which play out different historical events that Holtz has missed during his sleep. Sahjhan is the demon that brought Holtz back and has been keeping an eye on Angelus for the hunter for 227 years, ever since Holtz was first preserved.

Angel and Darla reminisce about the night that got them into the whole parent mess in the first place. The rest of the gang interrupt with new information about the scrolls and prophecies. They have discovered that instead of the "tro-klon" being a person's arrival, it is instead interpreted as different events. The gang begin to discuss possible ways to destroy the baby, whether it be evil or not, but Angel wants his child protected and refuses to let anyone hurt it, before or after it is born. Cordelia is reluctant to protect Darla or the baby but is more willing after she gets her delayed revenge by punching Darla in the face. Almost immediately after though, Darla begins to feel the pain of contractions.

Lilah signs a document in blood and offers it to a mailroom employee. The employee, Cyril, offers her a disk in exchange which contains pictures of Angel and Lilah making out in his office from when he was possessed. Cyril says that he is on her side willing to work against Gavin Park, who had bugs planted at the hotel by supposed exterminators. Lilah confronts Gavin about it and finds that Cyril was just playing her. Gavin has video cameras and audio transcripts from the daily activities at the hotel and just wanted to brag to Lilah about his accomplishments. Together, they look at some of the video and are both shocked to see a very pregnant Darla on the screen. Since it is impossible for a vampire to get pregnant, Lilah is quickly on the phone.

Darla's contractions are still far apart, but the pain is the kind she doesn't like and she wants the baby out. The gang discusses doctor options and agree that need access to medical equipment that will allow them to see what is actually inside of the vampire. Lilah and Gavin talk with Linwood, whom Lilah has called to notify about Darla's development. They discuss how no one at Wolfram & Hart saw it coming and that the Senior Partners need to be kept in the dark. Meanwhile, a spying Cyril makes a call to a Master Tarfall and informs him that the predictions were correct and the word must be spread to the others.

Nine years after losing his family, Holtz thinks back, but his thoughts are interrupted by the demon, Sahjhan. The first encounter between the two has Sahjhan knowing Holtz's future and predicting just when the hunter will face and destroy Angelus and Darla. Holtz is reluctant to believe the demon or accept his aid at first, but soon agrees to be brought 200-plus years into the future for his one opportunity to finally destroy the vampires who took away his family.

Darla is brought to a hospital where the gang uses an empty examining room to ultrasound Darla's womb. Her contractions have stopped, perhaps temporarily, but she is no less eager to rid her body of the baby inside. Holtz is tired of waiting to take out Angel and Darla, but Sahjhan insists on his patience if Holtz is to succeed. Switching to a human appearance, Sahjhan leads the way out of the underground space as they are about to make a move with the aid of some others.

At Wolfram and Hart, the psychics are questioned by Linwood and then killed because of their inability to predict Darla's pregnancy. The lawyers know that the baby of two vampires is the desired possession of many groups. Linwood informs Lilah that she will receive the blame in the case that the Senior Partners discover their mistake. Despite some confusion, the gang is able to identify Darla's baby as a human and a boy, which pleases Angel and he fully accepts his coming fatherhood, though Darla is preoccupied with her pain. A large group of vampires begin to line the room and fill the observation area above, but they are there to protect the baby, not hurt it. However, Cordelia, Wesley, Gunn and Fred are classified as food for Darla and her child and orders are given to kill them.

Sahjhan brings Holtz to a gym where their "minions" await for Holtz's instruction. The lawyers at Wolfram and Hart plan their attack on the hotel to acquire the baby from Darla. Gavin works with a military leader on getting into the hotel and Lilah arranges for a special doctor who will do the actual delivery. When her own life is threatened Darla is forced to help in the fight that is about to erupt at the hospital between the vampires and the gang. Fred holds a knife to Darla's stomach which holds the vampires off temporarily, but Fred unintentionally informs the other vampires that the knife can't hurt the baby and the fight starts.

The gang is able to escape unharmed despite the vampires and military men throughout the hospital. Darla tries to hide her true feelings, but Angel senses her human-like feelings towards her unborn child. The gang make plans for a quick stop at the hotel for the scrolls but intend to get out of town. Holtz attacks the military men guarding the hotel and proceeds inside where the doctor and others are waiting for Angel and Darla to return. Holtz disposes of the men and doctor, much to the surprise of Wolfram and Hart's lawyers who watch and listen to the battle with the surveillance equipment.

Angel leaves Darla and his friends parked in an empty alley while he goes for the scrolls. He directs them to leave without him if he doesn't return in five minutes. He finds the hotel a mess and his old enemy, Holtz, waiting for him. Darla screams as her water has broken and she's gone into active labor, but Angel still hasn't returned.
