= Blind Date (Angel) =

- Angel episode
- Episode no.: Season 1 Episode 21
- Directed by: Thomas J. Wright
- Written by: Jeannine Renshaw
- Production code: 1ADH21
- Original air date: May 16, 2000

Guest appearances
- Christian Kane as Lindsey McDonald; Thomas Burr as Lee Mercer; Stephanie Romanov as Lilah Morgan; Sam Anderson as Holland Manners; J. August Richards as Charles Gunn; Jennifer Badger Martin as Vanessa Brewer; Keilana Smith as Mind Reader #1; Dawn Suggs as Mind Reader #2; Charles Constant as Security Center Guard; Scott Berman as Vendor; Derek Anthony as Dying Black Man; Rishi Kumar as Blind Child #1; Karen Lu as Blind Child #2; Alex Buck as Blind Child #3

Episode chronology
← Previous "War Zone"	Next → "To Shanshu in L.A."
- Angel season 1

"Blind Date" is the 21st episode of the first season of the American television series Angel. Written by Jeannine Renshaw and directed by Thomas J. Wright, it was originally broadcast on May 16, 2000, on the WB network. In Blind Date, Angel reluctantly agrees to help lawyer Lindsey McDonald save a group of three blind children from a blind woman assassin hired by the Senior Partners of Wolfram & Hart. However, Lindsey struggles with his decision to save the children and betray the firm when Holland Manners, Lindsey's supervisor, offers him the promotion of a lifetime.

== Summary ==
Angel reluctantly agrees to help Lindsey McDonald crack the secret files of Wolfram & Hart to save a group of three blind children from a blind woman assassin hired by the unseen Senior Partners of the firm to kill the children. With a little help from Lindsey and Gunn who cause a diversion, Angel sneaks into the ultra-high-tech security firm to steal the firm’s computer files and also takes an ancient scroll he finds in the building safe. But Lindsey isn’t sure if he can stick by his decision to help Angel and betray the firm by sabotaging the deadly mission when Holland Manners, Lindsey‘s supervisor, offers him the promotion of a lifetime.

== Acting ==
Jennifer Badger, who guest stars as Vanessa, has previously been Charisma Carpenter and Eliza Dushku's stunt double in both Buffy and Angel. She was also one of the victims in Somnambulist, the eleventh episode of Angel season 1.

== Production details ==
Special effects Supervisor Loni Peristere says they couldn't afford to shoot Vanessa's perspective using greenscreen, so instead they came up with the "crazy idea" of painting the actors with glow-in-the-dark paint and shooting the scenes in the dark. The effect was intensified by offsetting the footage to create tracers, and then reversing the image - "it was supposed to tell the story that she sees the action before it actually happens," explains Peristere. "It was such a wacky idea and it really worked out well."

=== Writing ===
Producer Tim Minear explains that this episode provides a "detailed exploration of Wolfram & Hart, establishing the power base there and laying the groundwork for season 2." It also provides backstory for the character of Lindsey, including his motivations for working at Wolfram & Hart.

== Reception ==
In an essay entitled "Why We Love Lindsey", M.S. West says the scene at the end of the episode "fulfills Joss Whedon's earlier promise of a more adult show with less clear fault-lines of right and wrong." Lindsey makes a difficult choice between redemption and power, ultimately choosing to accept the promotion. "In that moment," West writes, "Lindsey is what Angel the show struggled through its first season to be."
