= War Zone (Angel) =

- Angel episode
- Episode no.: Season 1 Episode 20
- Directed by: David Straiton
- Written by: Garry Campbell
- Production code: 1ADH20
- Original air date: May 9, 2000

Guest appearances
- J. August Richards as Charles Gunn; Michele Kelly as Alonna; Maurice Compte as Chain; Mick Murray as Knox; Joe Basile as Lenny Edwards; David Herman as David Nabbit; Sean Parhm as Bobby; Sven Holmberg as Ty; Rebecca Klingler as Madame Dorion; Kimberly James as Lina; Ricky Luna as James

Episode chronology
← Previous "Sanctuary"	Next → "Blind Date"
- Angel season 1

"War Zone" is the 20th episode of the first season of the American television series Angel. Written by Gary Campbell and directed by David Straiton, it was originally broadcast on May 9, 2000 on the WB network. In War Zone, Angel helps software millionaire David Nabbit track down a blackmailer, ending up in the middle of a gang war between a group of street kids - led by amateur vampire hunter Charles Gunn - and a vampire gang who have settled in his South-Central neighborhood. Angel offers to assist Gunn in tracking down the vampires who abducted and killed Gunn's sister.

== Plot ==
A girl named Alonna Gunn walks down the street, followed by a group of vampires. When the vampires turn around, Alonna's brother Charles Gunn and many others are there, armed and ready for a fight. Several are killed on both sides and in the end the vampires run off leaving the humans to deal with the wounded.

Cordelia, Wesley and Angel meet prospective client David Nabbit at a party, who explains he is being blackmailed by Lenny Edwards for going to a demonic brothel called Madam Dorion's. Angel tracks down Lenny Edwards, and makes him promise he will hand over the incriminating photos the following night. Gunn, after receiving news that a vampire is nearby, witnesses Angel intimidating Edwards from afar, and plots to kill Angel. David pays Angel Investigations with a very large check, and promises more when the job is done.

The next night, Angel meets with Lenny, who brought the photos and a demon security guard. Angel kills the demon and gets away with the photos. However, he gets staked in the chest by a couple of the human gang members. He is chased and forced to run through a gauntlet of vampire killing weapons. When confronted by Gunn and the others, Angel saves Alonna's life from one of the traps and tries to explain that he is fighting for good.

Cordelia dresses Angel's wounds while they look at the graphic pictures that were being held for blackmail. Angel's still in pain, but goes off to find the nest of vampires before the gang of kids find it. Gunn questions Angel and his motivations for supposedly helping them. The vampires throw smoke bombs into the humans' hideaway, forcing them to escape to the surface. Covered in heavy clothes and wearing gas masks, the vampires capture several of the teen gang members, including Alonna.

Angel offers his assistance to Gunn and the others, but Gunn refuses and locks Angel in a meat locker. Angel tries to punch his way out of the locker, only to have Cordelia and Wesley open the door for him. Searching for the vampire's lair, Gunn finds a newly undead Alonna, but at first can't bring himself to kill what used to be his sister. When she offers to make her brother a vampire, he stakes her.

Angel kills the vampire gang leader and arranges a truce with the rest of the group: he'll allow them to live if they leave town and never return. Cordelia considers getting involved with David for his money, but ends up talking herself out of it. Angel tells Gunn he may need his help in the future.

== Production details ==
Creator Joss Whedon wanted to introduce another character who would be very different from both Wesley and Angel, and when writer Gary Campbell pitched the idea of street kids battling vampires, the character of Gunn was conceived.

Special Effects Supervisor Loni Peristere refined the dusting effect used when a vampire is killed, showcased by Gunn's "fly-through dusting" in the opening scene of this episode. This technique, which costs $5,000 per use, depends upon a CGI skeletal frame surrounded by simulated dust, carefully matched to a projection of the live action footage. This allows for a "complete organic transition" from vampire to dust, says Peristere.

Director David Straiton suggested to Michele Kelly that in the scene where Alonna pushes Gunn onto the ground, she should "enjoy that more" - "and that's when a laugh came out," Kelly says. The actress explains that the director knew at that point, her character was "relishing in all this new-found strength and freedom, even if it was for evil."

=== Writing ===
Producer Tim Minear liked the concept of an "entire subculture living under Los Angeles that you don't really see," which is a metaphor for the wealth stratification in LA: "You'll have upper class neighborhoods and a block away poverty... The upper class people sort of don't notice the poverty, or choose not to." He also liked the scene in which Angel is rescued from the meat locker by Wesley and Cordelia, who ask, "Why didn't you call us on your cell phone?", because it turns the concept of the action hero "on its head a little bit." The defining moment of the episode, Minear thinks, is when Angel - rather than offer his help - instead indicates he may later need Gunn's help.

In his book on the mythology of vampires, Peter Day points out the depiction of vampires as "gang-like" is a unifying characteristic of the LA subgenre, which includes (among others) The Lost Boys, the Blade films and television series, and Blood Ties. In this episode, gang violence is presented as a conflict of race - the racially diverse humans, led by Gunn, battle the uniformly vampire gang, who are presented as "fascist skinheads looking to maintain the purity of the blood supply." Their shared vampirism unifies the gang and provides them with a sense of community identity, in "a city whose urban sprawl has led to social and cultural segregation of communities," Day writes.

=== Acting ===
Michele Kelly, who played Gunn's sister Alonna, said she "literally shouted" with excitement upon reading the script. "Getting to play someone as unrestricted as a vampire is a thrill," she says. Kelly found the vampire make-up and prosthetics uncomfortable, but the most difficult aspect of the role was Kelly's pre-existing friendship with J. August Richards, which "made a part of me not want to hurt him." Kelly explains she twisted that connection by imagining the isolation and "raging despair" her character would feel after being made a vampire: "All I wanted is my brother... that's where I got the impetus to go into that ugly space - it was just the other side of loving."

David Nabbit was originally intended to be a recurring character, but only appears in two additional episodes. David Herman had difficulty fitting Angel into his schedule, and so the writers stopped writing scenes for him.
