= Vampire (Buffy the Vampire Slayer) =

Fictional species

- Buffyverse race
- First appearance: Buffy the Vampire Slayer (1992) (non-canon) "Welcome to the Hellmouth" (1997)
- Created by: Joss Whedon

In-universe information
- Other names: Vamp, Vampyr, Lonely One, Van-Tal, Lurk
- Type: Human-demon hybrid
- Distinctions: Superhuman strength, speed, agility, reflexes, stamina, and durability; Heightened senses of smell, hearing, and night vision; Accelerated healing; Sharp fangs; Innate hand-to-hand combat skills; Immunity from telepathy; Immortality; Sharp fingernails

In the fictional world of the television series Buffy the Vampire Slayer and its spin-off series Angel, a vampire is a unique variety of demon that can exist on the earthly plane only by inhabiting and animating a human corpse. They are also called Lonely Ones, Van-Tal, and Lurks.

== Description ==
The vampire Amilyn in the non-canonical film.

Vampires in the canonical Buffyverse differ significantly from their counterparts in the 1992 Buffy the Vampire Slayer movie. While the movie's vampires possess the ability to fly, maintain a relatively human appearance, and do not disintegrate into dust upon death, the vampires introduced in the first episode of the television series are portrayed as demonic spirits that inhabit human corpses.

According to Rupert Giles, an occult expert in the series, when an ancient race of demons called the Old Ones were banished from Earth, the last one fed on a human and mixed their blood, creating the first vampire. This vampire then fed on other humans and made more of its kind, essentially becoming a biological weapon for the Old Ones against the human race. According to Illyria, a character in Angel, vampires existed during her time as an Old One—long before the rest were banished from the realm. Because of their partly human nature, vampires are considered impure by other demons. Since the historic exploits of Count Dracula, vampires have simultaneously terrified and fascinated humanity; this enduring mystique ultimately inspired historical figures like Bram Stoker to compile the diaries and recorded documents of the Romanian vampire king into his seminal novel Dracula.

=== Characteristics ===
The series' vampires exhibit superhuman abilities, including increased strength, heightened senses, and accelerated healing. These powers intensify as they age or when they consume the blood of powerful supernatural beings. Vampires live indefinitely without aging, with the oldest losing the ability to appear human. Vampires can change at will between human appearance and a monstrous form with a pronounced brow ridge, yellow eyes, and sharp teeth. This transformation can happen in seconds. In human form, they can be detected by their lack of heartbeat and lower body temperature. They do not cast reflections, although they can be photographed and filmed.

Vampires in the series possess all the memories and skills of their human predecessors. They also retain much of their host's personality, including any mental illnesses or emotional instabilities. For example, Spike, an exception among his kind, preserved his ability to love, as seen in his devotion to his dying mother. Harmony kept her valley girl personality and her love of unicorns. Darla notes that a vampire’s human identity shapes their immortal self when she tells the newly turned Angelus, "What we were, informs what we become." Following her resurrection as a human, she expands on this, arguing that the darkness Angelus unleashed was not born of his curse, but had always existed within Liam. Traumatized by his father's abuse, his human dark side simply became magnified through his transformation into a vampire. Most vampires in the Buffyverse do not have human souls, but they are capable of feeling human emotions, such as love—though these tend to be expressed as twisted and obsessive behavior—and without souls, they typically can only experience the negative affectivity associated with evil. In the episode "The Harvest", Giles says the human corpse a vampire is born into is infected with a demon soul via vampiric blood, and therefore lacks a conscience. Restoring a vampire's human soul—as seen with Angel and Spike—awakens crushing remorse, demanding fierce willpower to resist evil impulses and stay sane.

=== Blood ===
Vampires in the Buffy universe live on a diet of blood, preferring fresh human blood; they can distinguish the blood of different animals by flavor, and those who do not drink human blood enjoy that of otters. They require no other food or drink; although they can ingest it, they generally find it bland. Prolonged deprivation of blood can impair a vampire's higher brain functions, and they become "living skeletons", but do not die. They do not need to breathe air—although they can breathe to speak or smoke—and they cannot pass breath on to others via CPR. They are affected by drugs, poisons, and electricity, and they can be sedated and tasered. Some vampires in the series enjoy recreational drug use like alcoholic and caffeinated beverages, and tobacco—Spike, the witty "bad boy" vampire, frequently enjoys smoking cigarettes, and Angel frequently drinks coffee and tea to cope with his restless lifestyle.

To reproduce, vampires must drain a human being of most of their blood, then force the victim to drink some of the vampire's blood. Known as "siring," this process transforms a human into a "scion" under the guidance of their vampire "sire". Sires often mentor their scions, forming small, purposeful covens of related vampires. Some vampires can be telepathically linked to those that they have sired. The amount of time it takes for a new vampire to rise seems to vary; Buffy often kills vampires as they rise from their graves, but other vampires rise after only a few hours.

=== Vulnerabilities ===
The vampires in Buffy heal quickly from most injuries, but do not regrow lost limbs, and can acquire scars. They can be killed if beheaded, exploded, staked through the heart with a wooden object, or exposed to sunlight, fire, or excessive amounts of holy water. When killed, vampires rapidly turn to dust. Their vulnerability to sunlight limits vampires' movements and makes them most nocturnal. Because of this, they sleep mostly during the day and are dependent on underground tunnels and caves to avoid direct sunlight. Spike, however, is shown on several occasions driving during the day by blocking the sunlight coming through his car windows with foil, and leaving a small strip clear to see the road. Vampires sometimes enlist humans such as criminals, other demons, or occult organizations like Wolfram & Hart for tasks during the day.

Vampires' flesh burns upon contact with blessed objects such as holy water, a Bible, recently consecrated ground, or a Christian cross. Knowing this, Buffy wears a small cross pendant necklace at all times for minor protection. Vampires can enter consecrated buildings but appear to feel ill at ease. They cannot enter a human residence without having been invited once by a living resident; once given, such an invitation can only be revoked by a magic ritual. If all living residents die, they can enter freely. Areas open to the public and the homes of other vampires, demons, and non-humans are not protected. Finally, vampires are attracted to bright colors and are said to dislike garlic.

=== Variations ===
Variations of vampires are seen on both Buffy and Angel. In the Angel season 2 episode "Through the Looking Glass", Angel and his team travel to a parallel world, Pylea, where he becomes a "Van-Tal" demon with green skin, spines and a bestial appearance. This form is described in the series as the vampire (specifically the demon that creates the vampire) in its purest form. While in this form, Angel lacks the ability to reason, possessing neither the compassion his soul gives him nor the sadism he possesses as Angelus.

The seventh season of Buffy introduces the Turok-Han, an ancient species of vampire analogous to Neanderthal man. These Turok-Han, colloquially referred to as "über-vamps", are stronger and harder to kill than common vampires, can usually withstand a stake to the chest without dusting and show only minor burns when doused with holy water, but can still be killed by beheading or sunlight.

Vampires generally cannot reproduce sexually, but mystical circumstances allow the characters Angel and Darla to conceive a son, Connor, who has a human soul with vampire-like abilities of strength, endurance, agility, and senses, but none of their weaknesses or need to drink blood. Despite being a descendant of vampires, Connor physically ages like humans, indicating that, unlike vampires, he is not an immortal and therefore will die eventually.

== Development ==
A vampire "dusting". The writers felt that having vampires disintegrate after death would be convenient for the story.

In the show, the idea of the "vamp faces" — to have vampires' human features distort to become more demonic — was implemented because Whedon wanted to have high school students that the other characters could interact with normally only to later reveal that these people were vampires, creating a sense of paranoia. He also wanted to make the vampires look demonic to avoid airing a show "about a high school girl who was stabbing normal-looking people in the heart".

In early episodes, the vampires appeared "very white-faced, very creepy, very ghoulish". This was changed in later seasons to make the vampires look more human because of the sympathetic vampire character Angel and because elaborate make-up was time-consuming. Whedon said that people thought the white faces were "funny looking" but found it creepy, comparing it to the monsters in zombie movies such as Day of the Dead and The Evil Dead. The character of the Master was designed to be in permanent vamp face to highlight his age and make him appear animalistic. Make-up artist John Vulich based the Master's appearance on a bat, suggesting that the character had devolved to a more primal, demonic state over the years.

When creating the vampire "rules" that they would use in the show, the writers used elements from existing vampire lore. They decided the vampires would not fly as in the Buffy movie because they could not make flying vampires look convincing on a television budget. It was decided that vampires and their clothes would turn to dust after they died. According to the Gamer.com, this effect cost nearly five thousand dollars to create. Each episode of Buffy the Vampire Slayer contains fifty to eighty special effects shots around 10 percent of that ended up in the final shows. Garlic is mentioned or used as vampire repellent in a few episodes, but its effect on vampires is never stated. Some established rules, such as a vampire's inability to enter a home uninvited, both helped and hindered the storytelling. Whedon said that whereas shows such as The X-Files spend time explaining the science behind the supernatural and making it as real as possible, Buffy and Angel are more concerned with the emotion resulting from the supernatural rather than justifying how it could conceivably exist. The shows therefore tend to gloss over the details of vampire and demon lore, simply using the Hellmouth as a plot device to explain unexplainable things.

In the first episode, vampires' clothes reflect the era in which they died. Joss Whedon felt this concept was a "charming notion" but rejected it because he believed that if every vampire in the show were dressed in old-fashioned clothes, they would cease to be scary.

== See also ==
- Vampire fiction
