= Dennis Gersten =

American dramatist

Dennis Gersten American actor and director who helped create Stagewrights, Inc. in New York City, a playwrights' theatre company. There, he wrote Mine and the one-acts Rhetoric and Puppy Chow and directed and performed in original works. Gersten attended the graduate program in acting at California Institute of the Arts where he wrote Willie Said To, a finalist with the LA Arts Council and other contests nationally and performed at Playwrights Arena and Unity Players; Desert - Morning, performed at the Gene Dynarski Theatre; and Dirty Slut. Primarily an actor, Gersten performed with Linda Hamilton in the world premiere of Worse Than Murder: Ethel and Julius Rosenberg at the Ventura Court Theatre and the west coast premiere of David and Goliath in America with the Road Theatre Company, for which he received an ADA Award. He is a founding member of Theatre Unlimited, where he was seen in Shoe Man and Move Over, Mrs. Markham, and where he directed The Author’s Thumb, his own adaptation of the works of Henry Fielding, for which Gersten received three ADA Awards, as a director, writer and producer. He was also nominated for an LA Weekly Theater Award for his performance in Dirk at the Road Theatre.
