= J. August Richards =

American actor

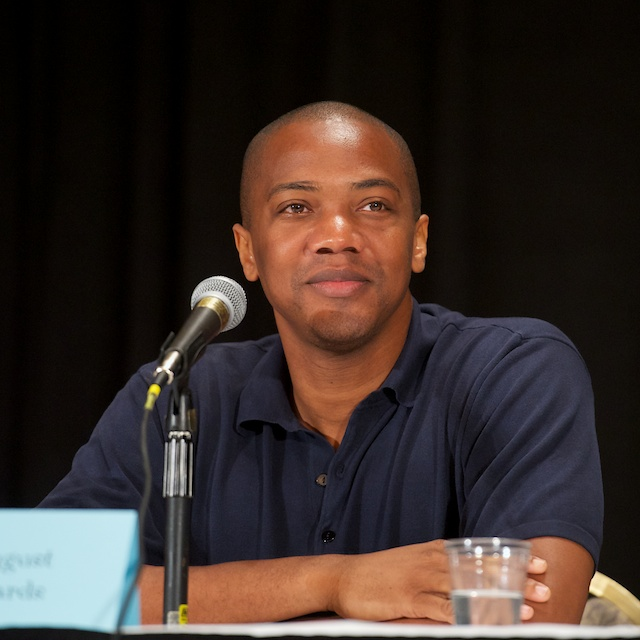
- J. August Richards at the August 31, 2012 DragonCon
- Born: Jaime Augusto Richards III; August 28, 1973 (age 53); Washington, D.C., U.S.
- Occupation: Actor
- Years active: 1988–present
- Spouse: Joshua Gbor (m. 2023)

Jaime Augusto Richards III (born August 28, 1973), commonly known as J. August Richards, is an American actor. He is best known for his portrayal of Charles Gunn in the television series Angel and Mike Peterson / Deathlok on Agents of S.H.I.E.L.D.

== Early life ==
Richards is of Afro-Panamanian descent. He grew up in Bladensburg, Maryland. Richards attended the Visual and Performing Arts program at Suitland High School in Suitland, Maryland and graduated in 1991. He attended the USC School of Dramatic Arts on a scholarship.

== Career ==
Richards's acting career began when he was spotted by a casting director. This resulted in him getting a guest star role on The Cosby Show as Vanessa's boyfriend Roy in the season 5 episode "Out of Brooklyn". Other guest appearances would come later on shows such as The Practice, Chicago Hope, Any Day Now, and Nash Bridges. Playing a rapping bike messenger who believes he is an alien abductee, it was the role of Taj Mahal in the Mark Taper Forum production of Tina Landau's play Space that first brought recognition.

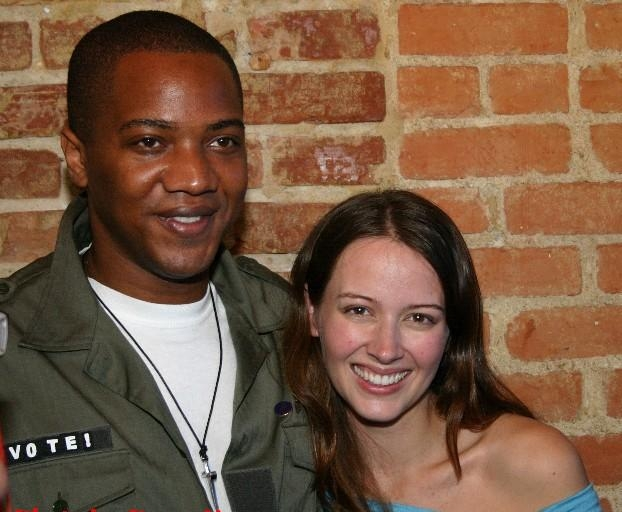
Richards with Amy Acker at a 2004 John Kerry fund raiser.

Richards has appeared in feature films Why Do Fools Fall in Love and Good Burger. He starred in the television movies Critical Assembly and Mutiny, and appeared as singer Richard Street in the NBC miniseries The Temptations. Richards has also guest-starred on The West Wing and The 4400.

Richards gained a recurring role beginning in the first season of Angel as Charles Gunn, a street-wise vampire hunter. He was promoted to a regular at the start of the second season, and remained a member of the cast throughout the rest of the show's run.

Richards has so far been featured in four series as an attorney: Beginning in the first episode of season five of Angel, "Conviction", Gunn becomes a lawyer after having his brain upgraded with a comprehensive knowledge of the law (both human and dæmonic) by the international and interdimensional law firm Wolfram & Hart. In 2006, Richards joined the cast of NBC's Law & Order spin-off Conviction as Billy Desmond, an undefeated New York City Assistant District Attorney with political aspirations. He has also been featured in CBS's CSI: Miami as the Floridian attorney Bob Villa, and portrayed attorney Marcus McGrath in the TNT series Raising the Bar until its cancellation.

Richards portrayed a young Richard Webber in two Grey's Anatomy episodes: "The Time Warp" in season six, and "Only Mama Knows" in season eleven. He also appeared in an episode of The Mentalist. Richards had played the part of Damon in "Just Say Yes", a 1998 episode of the science fiction television series Sliders. Richards also guest-starred in an episode of Syfy's Warehouse 13.

On April 5, 2013, TVLine confirmed that Richards had been given an unspecified role in ABC's Agents of S.H.I.E.L.D. The character was later revealed to be a character named Mike Peterson, a human being with implants for injections of super-serum (similar to those of Captain America) known as Deathlok.

Also in 2013, Richards created his own sci-fi web series called The Hypnotist.

== Personal life ==
Richards publicly came out as gay in April 2020. On September 1, 2023, Richards married his partner, model Joshua Gbor.

== Filmography ==
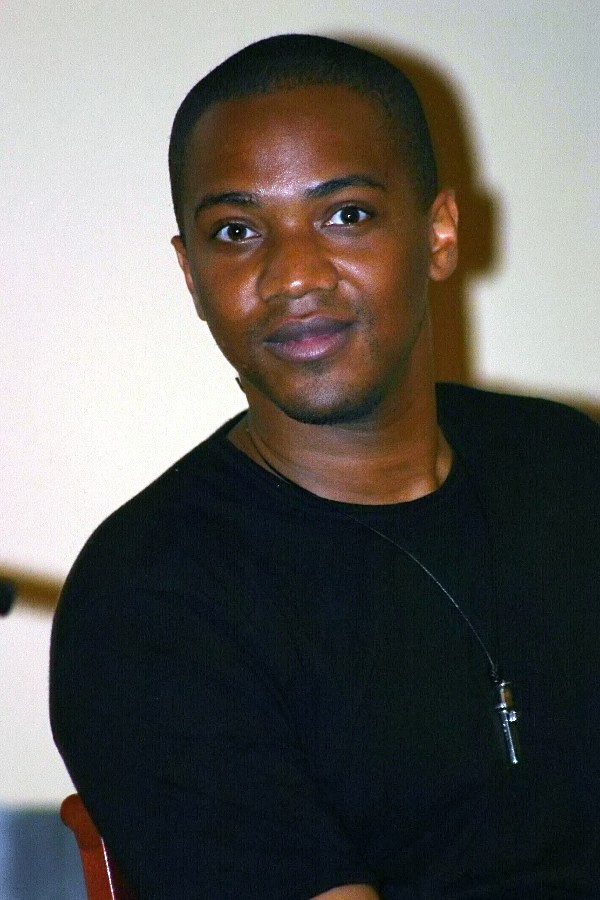
Richards in 2004

=== Film ===
Year	Film	Role	Notes
1995	Higher Learning	Partygoer	
1997	Good Burger	Griffen	
1998	Why Do Fools Fall in Love	Sherman	
2006	Paved with Good Intentions	Travis Balden	
2016	If Congress Was Your Co-Worker	Steve	Short
2020	Pearl	Isaac Robbins	

=== Television ===
Year	Show	Role	Notes
1988	The Cosby Show	Roy	Episode: "Out of Brooklyn"
1993	Family Matters	Guy at Mall #2	Episode: "Scenes From a Mall"
1995	OP Center	FBI Van Tech	Miniseries
1995	Space: Above and Beyond	Lt. Thomas	Episode: "The River of Stars"
1996	Diagnosis Murder	Troy Sommers	Episode: "The Pressure to Murder"
1997	JAG	Seaman Bernard	Episode: "Rendezvous"
1997	Good News	John Braxton	Episode: "Try a Little Tenderness"
1997	Players	Sam Bodie	Episode: "Contact Sport"
1998	Awesome Adventures	Himself/host	Documentary series
1998	Chicago Hope	Eric Lane	Episode: "Bridge over Troubled Waters"
1998	Clueless	Stewey	Episode: "Friends"
1998	Sliders	Damon	Episode: "Just Say Yes"
1998	The Temptations	Richard Street	2 episodes
1999	Mutiny	Reece Johnson	TV movie
1999	The Practice	Michael Anderson	Episode: "Do Unto Others"
1999	The West Wing	Bill	Episode: "Post Hoc, Ergo Propter Hoc"
1999	Nash Bridges	Ernie Vesper	Episode: "Rip Off"
2000	Moesha	Sean	Episode: "Family Affair"
2000	Undressed	Bryce	Recurring cast (season 2)
2000	Any Day Now	Billy	Episode: "It's a Good Thing I'm Not Black"
2000	Running Mates	Randall's Aide	TV movie
2000–04	Angel	Charles Gunn	Recurring cast (season 1), main cast (season 2-5)
2002	Critical Assembly	Allan Marshall	TV movie
2004	CSI: Miami	S.A. Bob Villa	Episode: "Hell Night"
2006	Conviction	A.D.A. Billy Desmond	Main cast
2006	The 4400	John Shaffner	Episode: "The Starzl Mutation"
2008–09	Raising the Bar	Marcus McGrath	Main cast
2010	Grey's Anatomy	Young Richard Webber	Episode: "The Time Warp"
2010	The Defenders	ADA Bracken	Episode: "Nevada v. Carter" & "Nevada v. Killa Diz"
2011	The Mentalist	Dr. Vernon Watson	Episode: "Bloodstream"
2011	Warehouse 13	Zach Adanto	Episode: "Past Imperfect"
2013	Emily Owens, M.D.	George Morgan	Episode: "Emily... and the Leap"
2013	Arrow	Mr. Blank	Episode: "Home Invasion"
2013–18	Agents of S.H.I.E.L.D.	Mike Peterson / Deathlok	Recurring cast (season 1-2), guest (season 5)
2014	The Lottery	Deputy Secretary of State Nathan Mitchell	Recurring cast
2014	Grey's Anatomy	Young Richard Webber	Episode: "Only Mama Knows"
2014–16	Girlfriends' Guide to Divorce	Ford	Recurring cast (season 1-2)
2016	Notorious	Bradley Gregorian	Main cast
2017–18	Kevin (Probably) Saves the World	Deputy Nathan Purcell	Main cast
2018	Giants	Andrew	Episode: "What Kind of Man Are You?"
2020	Council of Dads	Dr. Oliver Post	Main cast
2021	Generation	Joe	Recurring cast
2022	Vampire Academy	Victor Dashkov	Recurring cast
2022	The Rookie	Lind	Episode: "The Reckoning"
2023	The Rookie Feds	Lind	Episode "payback"
2025	Fire Country	Bruce	3 episode
