= Darla (Angel episode) =

- Angel episode
- Episode no.: Season 2 Episode 7
- Directed by: Tim Minear
- Written by: Tim Minear
- Production code: 2ADH07
- Original air date: November 14, 2000

Guest appearances
- Sam Anderson as Holland Manners; Julie Benz as Darla; Christian Kane as Lindsey McDonald; Juliet Landau as Drusilla; James Marsters as William; Mark Metcalf as The Master; Zitto Kazann as Gypsy Man; Lin Oeding as Chinese Boxer; Bart Petty as Security Guard

Episode chronology
| ← Previous "Guise Will Be Guise" | Next → "The Shroud of Rahmon" |
- Angel season 2

"Darla" is the seventh episode of the second season of the American television series Angel. Written and directed by Tim Minear, it was originally broadcast on November 14, 2000, on the WB television network. In this episode, Angel tries to rescue Darla from the clutches of Wolfram & Hart and Lindsey's affections, as she suffers guilt of her demonic past. Flashbacks show Darla as a syphilis-stricken prostitute being transformed into a vampire by the demonic Master, her retaliation when the Gypsies cursed Angelus with a soul, and the Boxer Rebellion in China.

== Plot ==
Angel is trying to locate Darla, over the objections of the group, who suggest Wolfram & Hart may just be trying to keep him distracted. Gunn suggests that they probably have connections to the place where she's staying. The team at Angel investigations finds Darla's new home, and Angel starts to rush off, but Wesley stops him, saying that he and Gunn will look into the situation.

Angel leaves to go find Darla and help her. Angel confronts Lindsey in a parking garage. Lindsey tells him Darla is in trouble and that they plan to kill her. Angel promises to come back and kill him if he is lying. He finds and rescues Darla, who tells him that Angelus is the only one who understands her. She wants him to turn her back, saying she cannot bear to feel her own heartbeat. Angel tells her it is a gift to be human, but she disagrees and demands he "return the favor" for turning him into a vampire. Stunned at this rejection, Darla runs out of the office.

Interwoven with this narrative are scenes depicting Darla's past. She is made a vampire by the Master in 1609, Colony of Virginia. In 1760, Darla chooses Angelus over the Master and goes with him. In 1880, while strolling the streets of London, Angelus, Darla, and Drusilla bump into a man named William, later known as Spike. In need of companionship, Drusilla makes him into a vampire. During the Boxer Rebellion in China, Angel tracks down Darla, and asks her for a second chance to rule at her side.

== Production ==
Composer Robert J. Kral says this is his favorite episode to have scored, as he was able to write several different themes for the character of Darla. He was asked by director Tim Minear to write music that was "epochy. Something with horns...something Wagnerish." Kral and Buffy composer Thomas Wanker deliberately chose not to collaborate, so that the cross-over scenes would "maintain a different perspective," Kral says.

Production designer Stuart Blatt says the Boxer Rebellion flashback scenes in this episode and "Fool for Love" were filmed at a movie ranch with a standing set for a Mexican village. "Through our research," Blatt says, "we realized that a lot of Chinese towns looked very similar to small Mexican villages...clay adobe structures with either thatched or tower roofs." Gaffer Dan Kerns explains that to simulate the burning streets, his crew set up numerous 'flicker boxes' that "pulse like a flame", in addition to simulated moonlight from "cherry picker"-like machines.

=== Acting ===
Actress Julie Benz says the flashback scenes are "the high points" of playing Darla; her favorite scene is the Boxer Rebellion. Gaffer Dan Kerns' girlfriend Heidi Strickler appears in that scene, playing the frightened mother in the alley whom Angel attempts to shelter.

Minear likens the storytelling approach in this episode to the non-linear, looping technique exhibited by Quentin Tarantino's Pulp Fiction: "It's a different story happening in the same universe."

== Reception ==
This episode won "Best Period Hair Styling in a Series" at the Hollywood Makeup Artist and Hair Stylist Guild Awards. Joss Whedon stated this episode as his all-time favorite episode, during an "Attack of the Show" interview.
