= Underneath (Angel) =

- Angel episode
- Episode no.: Season 5 Episode 17
- Directed by: Skip Schoolnik
- Written by: Sarah Fain; Elizabeth Craft
- Production code: 5ADH17
- Original air date: April 14, 2004

Guest appearances
- Christian Kane as Lindsey McDonald; Sarah Thompson as Eve; Adam Baldwin as Marcus Hamilton; Nicholl Hiren as Trish; Christian Boewe as Zach; Jared Poe as Carlos

Episode chronology
← Previous "Shells"	Next → "Origin"
- Angel season 5

"Underneath" is the 17th episode of the fifth season of the American television series Angel. Written by Elizabeth Craft and Sarah Fain and directed by Skip Schoolnik, it was originally broadcast on April 14, 2004 on the WB television network.

In "Underneath", Angel, Spike and Gunn find the exiled Lindsey in a suburban hell dimension to bring him back to Earth to interrogate him on what he knows about the Senior Partners' plans for the upcoming apocalypse. Meanwhile, a well-dressed, deadly stranger named Marcus Hamilton infiltrates Wolfram & Hart looking for Eve, and a grief-stricken Wesley withdraws into drinking while trying to ‘domesticate’ the evil but confused Illyria to the ways of Earth.

== Plot ==
Angel and Spike attempt to have a board meeting, but they are the only ones who show up, as the entire office is grief-stricken over Fred's death. They reminisce about Fred and discuss the impending apocalypse. Angel says that the Senior Partners are planning something. He does not want to wait for them to act, so Spike suggests finding a link to them. They head to Eve's apartment, but she refuses to help Angel after letting the Senior Partners take Lindsey. Angel notes that Eve is hiding from the Senior Partners because they will take her if they find out where she is. As the building starts shaking, the protective symbols in the apartment dissolve, and Eve says that she will tell him anything he wants to know if he takes her with him. As a man in a suit (Adam Baldwin) arrives, Angel, Spike and Eve flee to Wolfram & Hart. They ask Gunn if he has jurisdiction to protect Eve. Gunn reveals that Angel, as CEO, can invoke an order to protect Eve.

Angel wants to know what Lindsey knows about the Senior Partners, and Gunn points out that Lindsey is living with a beautiful wife and son in the Senior Partners' idea of Hell: suburbia. Angel, Spike, and Gunn head to the garage and get in a self-driving Camaro. Gunn tells them they have to find the Wrath, which they need to go through to return to Wolfram & Hart.

Lindsey has no memory of his past life and refuses to speak to Angel. Angel removes a necklace from Lindsey, breaking the spell Lindsey is under and causing Lindsey's wife and son to open fire with uzis. Seeing that the Camaro has disappeared, Gunn suggests trying to get out through the basement, which they discover is a torture chamber. Angel finds a flaming furnace and thinks it might be the Wrath. Lindsey notes that "he" is coming, and the men see a demon. Spike and Angel fight the Wrath, but it overpowers them. Gunn puts on Lindsey's necklace, volunteering to take Lindsey's place. Angel realizes that Gunn is attempting to atone for Fred's death. Gunn tells them they must leave before he forgets, as the door will close.

At Wolfram & Hart, the man in the suit breaches security. Harmony tries to break his neck, but he tosses her aside. Lorne begins to warn Angel about the man in the suit, but realizes Gunn has not returned. The man in the suit arrives and pulls out a contract for Eve to sign. He introduces himself as Marcus Hamilton, the new liaison to the Senior Partners. Eve has signed over her immortality and duties to him. Hamilton tells Angel that the Senior Partners are 100% behind him, and welcomes Spike to the team.

In Angel's apartment, Lorne pulls bullets out of Spike as Lindsey and Eve cuddle, happy to be reunited. Angel tells Lindsey he will go into the holding facilities of Wolfram & Hart after he tells Angel and the group what he knows about the Senior Partners' plans. Lindsey talks about Earth being Hell, which is how Wolfram & Hart thrives. Angel says he has already heard that speech. Lindsey tells Angel the apocalypse has been around them even before Angel and his friends came to work at Wolfram & Hart, and Angel has not seen it yet.

== Production ==
In an essay exploring Illyria's postmodern identity, Jennifer A. Hudson feels that Wesley's dream suggests that Fred still exists through her connection with Illyria. The dream - in which Fred says "This is only the first layer. Don’t you wanna see how deep I go?" - may be intended to reveal that Fred's "subliminal energy" has been consumed and deposited deep in Illyria’s unconscious as "potential energy, ready to be activated and unleashed at any given time."

The scene in the beginning with Lorne sitting in a bar reading a client was added because the episode would have been too short otherwise.

It was during the making of this episode that the network told producers the show would not be renewed for another season.
