= Fredless =

- Angel episode
- Episode no.: Season 3 Episode 5
- Directed by: Marita Grabiak
- Written by: Mere Smith
- Production code: 3ADH05
- Original air date: October 22, 2001

Guest appearances
- Andy Hallett as Lorne; Gary Grubbs as Roger Burkle; Jennifer Griffin as Trish Burkle

Episode chronology
← Previous "Carpe Noctem"	Next → "Billy"
- Angel season 3

"Fredless" is the 5th episode of the third season of the American television series Angel. Written by Mere Smith and directed by Marita Grabiak, it was originally broadcast on October 22, 2001 on the WB network. Fred's parents, Roger and Trish Burkle, arrive in town from Texas to take her home with them, prompting Fred to run away. Angel learns that Fred's problems with her mother and father are purely emotional while Mr. and Mrs. Burkle prove themselves to be formidable fighters against demons. Meanwhile, the gang is unknowingly in danger after Angel beheads a vicious demon whose head is the breeding ground for a strain of insect demons, causing a swarm of giant cockroaches to lay siege to the hotel in order to retrieve their offspring.

== Plot ==
Fred asks about Angel’s relationship with Buffy, curious because he left so abruptly to meet her at the end of the previous episode. Cordelia and Wesley put on an overly-dramatic, humorous play that summarizes what Angel and Buffy's off-screen reunion might have been like. When Angel returns, he invites Fred out to ice cream, but ends up tracking a Durslar demon into the sewers. Fred notices some crystal formations on the sewer wall before Angel sends her back to the Hyperion Hotel for safety.

The gang reorganize the weapons cabinet, bored and anxious for a job. Cordelia discovers an object that could be a weapon or a toaster that Fred was making. A couple, Roger and Trish Burkle, enter the hotel searching for assistance in finding their lost daughter, Fred, whom another private detective traced to Angel Investigations. The Burkles are oblivious to the supernatural so Cordelia, Wesley, and Gunn lie about Fred's disappearance and their work. When Fred returns and sees the couple in the lobby, she dashes upstairs unseen. She tries to erase the writing she scribbled over her bedroom walls, then leaves the hotel.

Angel returns with the severed head of the Durslar demon and is introduced to the Burkles as their associate who also works in movies, hence the "fake" demon head. They all head upstairs, but find her room empty. While the Burkles wait out in the lobby, Angel and the crew converse about the possible reasons for Fred to run away from her parents and whether the Burkles are being completely honest. They join the Burkles again and everyone splits up to find her.

After roaming the streets alone, Fred ends up at Caritas and tries to get help from Lorne, who is bitter about the recent fight that destroyed much of his bar. She sings without provocation and exposes her obvious fear and panic to him. He knows what she's running from and she doesn't realize she's strong enough to face it.

Eventually, the rest of the gang ends up at Caritas. However, Lorne refuses to play along with attempts to keep the Burkles oblivious to demonic activity and expresses his distaste for being used all the time. Finally, Lorne reveals that Fred is at the bus station. When her family and friends show up, Fred doesn't want to admit that her parents are real because it means her awful experience in Pylea was real, but she finally breaks down. Just then, a giant bug demon that followed Angel from the sewers attacks the group. Weaponless, Angel tries to handle the demon alone; all attempts to hide the truth from the Burkles are forgotten as the group rushes to Gunn's truck for fighting tools. Angel continues the fight with the bug demon until Trish Burkle kills it by driving a bus into it.

Back at the hotel, Fred notices the crystals she saw in the sewers on the Durslar's head. Fred wonders about her place in the gang while her parents are just grateful to have their daughter back. They reveal how they were prepared to call the police, thinking Angel and friends kidnapped their daughter. She decides that she wants to go home with her parents because she doesn't really belong with the rest of the group. As Fred packs, she tells Angel she wrote her life story on her bedroom wall.

After Fred leaves with her parents, many bug demons begin to show up at the hotel. Fred, who has realized in the cab that the cockroach demons would return, rushes back to deploy her toaster weapon, sending an ax flying at the severed demon head. The head splits open, releasing little bugs that the other demons collect before departing. Fred explains how she realized the little crystals were dried ichor from the bug demon, indicating a connection between it and the severed head. Fred decides she does have a place at Angel Investigations after all, and invites everyone up to her room, where they help her paint the walls. Fred paints over a picture she drew of her and Angel on the horse from Pylea.

== Reception ==
UGO Networks called this episode the season's low point, because it "mines the 'dreaded parental visit' plotline."
