= Conviction (Angel) =

- Angel episode
- Episode no.: Season 5 Episode 1
- Directed by: Joss Whedon
- Written by: Joss Whedon
- Production code: 5ADH01
- Original air date: October 1, 2003

Guest appearances
- Sarah Thompson as Eve; Mercedes McNab as Harmony Kendall; Jonathan M. Woodward as Knox; Dane Northcutt as Hauser; Jacqueline Hahn as Judge; Marc Vann as Dr. Sparrow; Michael Shamus Wiles as Spanky; Rod Rowland as Corbin Fries; Peter Breitmayer as Desmond Keel; TJ Thyne as Lawyer; Keli'i as Sam; Jordan Garrett as Matthew; Marissa Tait as Woman; Daniella Kuhn as Notary; Chris Eckles as Special Ops Guy; Susan Slome as Cindy Rabinowitz

Episode chronology
← Previous "Home"	Next → "Just Rewards"
- Angel season 5

"Conviction" is the first episode of the fifth season of the American television series Angel, originally broadcast on The WB network. In this episode, Wolfram & Hart C.E.O. Angel and the rest of the group cope with their new, morally ambiguous lifestyle. Their client - an unsavory, violent gangster - threatens to unleash a virus if they fail to keep him out of jail. Biological warfare is averted when Gunn uses the knowledge of the law that Wolfram & Hart mystically bestowed upon him to prevent the gangster from being incarcerated.

== Plot ==
Angel saves a woman from a vampire in an alley; however, thanks to a tracking device, Wolfram & Hart lawyers surround the scene. Angel is admonished because the dead vampire worked for the firm's clients.

At Wolfram & Hart, Fred gets lost en route to her office. Wesley finds her and she tells him that her lab is "giganamous" and she's unsure of the function of most of the machines in it. Her assistant Knox catches up to Fred; Wesley tries to make conversation by asking him how long he's been evil. After Knox leads Fred to her office, Gunn meets up with Wesley, who complains that Fred called her lab assistant "Knoxy". Gunn admits that though he doesn't belong there, they can turn things around and make them better. Lorne passes by, proving that he's extremely comfortable in this new setting. Meanwhile, Angel's liaison to the Senior Partners introduces herself as Eve; she tosses him an apple to drive home the irony of her name. She points out that if he wants to use Wolfram & Hart's power to do good in L.A., he will have to be prepared to do some bad too, saying, "In order to keep this place running, you have to keep it, well, running." Angel responds with a simple bite of the apple.

In his office, Gunn encounters Eve, who says that things were a lot simpler when he was just hunting vamps on the street with his gang. She wonders if he's ready for "the next step" and he confirms that he is; she hands him a business card and says, "You'll feel like a new man."

The next day, Angel is unhappy to learn his new secretary is ditzy vampire Harmony Kendall (last seen on Angel in "Disharmony" and on Buffy in "Crush"); she tells him, "I'm strong, I'm quick, I'm incredibly sycophantic - if that means what that guy said - and I type like a superhero…if there was a superhero whose power was typing." Angel notes that the blood she's brought him tastes good; she tells him that the secret ingredient is otter. Wesley arrives, explaining he picked Harmony from the pool because he thought he would like having someone familiar around. "You turned evil a lot faster than I thought you would," Angel replies. Harmony's happy to be reunited with the group, especially Cordelia, until Angel breaks the news that Cordelia is in a coma.

Harmony brings in client Corbin Fries, on trial for smuggling in girls for prostitution and cheap labor. He readily admits he's guilty; when Angel says he has no incentive to keep him out of jail, Fries says, "Either you get me off, or I drop the bomb."

In a conference room, Lorne has each employee sing so he can read them for potential evil. In the science lab, Fred explains Lorne's skills to Knox; Knox tells her that if she wants him to, he'll go up and get read so that she can be sure he's not evil. Fred is still unsure that she'll be capable of running the whole lab. In Angel's office, the gang wonders if the bomb Fries threatened is mystical. Harmony says she has the address for a guy named Spanky, a "freelance mystic" whose name has shown up in Fries' file. Angel heads to the garage, which houses a fleet of expensive corporate cars, and takes one out to pay Spanky a visit. Spanky reveals he built a mystical container which can hold anything, until the container is dissolved by a magic word. Back in the science lab, Fred and Knox look through Fries' file and discover he is linked to a cult which specializes in "quick-fire disease scenarios." When Fred tells him that Fries may be messing with a virus, Angel says that he knows where the bomb is: inside Fries' son's heart.

Meanwhile, Gunn is enduring a stressful procedure at the doctor's office. Back at the firm, Fred tells Wesley that they've had no luck figuring out what virus Fries might be using. Eve pays Angel a visit in his office; she finds it ironic that Angel's dealing with a guy who put a virus in his own son when Angel just lost his son. She reminds him that Connor is happy and he's the only one who remembers him. Angel tells her that he doesn't want her to say Connor's name, and Eve says that if he takes every case this personally, he won't last long. Fred and Knox spend the night looking over files and photos while eating Chinese takeout. Frustrated, Fred accuses her crew of not working hard enough to save people. The next day, Fries' trial continues; Lorne calls Angel from the trial and says that he thinks they should isolate Matthew (Fries' son); as Agent Hauser listens in, Lorne tells Angel that Fries has no chance of getting off. Hauser tells his agents to go after the kid and anyone within 50 yards of him, and as Angel heads for Matthew's school Harmony tells him that the special ops team are already on their way. However, when the special ops team gases Matthew's classroom, they realize it's empty except for Angel. "So it turns out," he says, "with this new deal and all, I own a helicopter."

As Fries' trial heads into final summations, Gunn arrives in a nice suit and gets Keel to cede to him. Gunn moves for a mistrial and announces that the judge should remove herself from the case because according to the judge's tax records, she holds stock in a company owned by a company owned by Fries'. The judge claims not to know about the connection, but Gunn says he discovered it in only six hours. As Angel and the agents fight, Hauser calls him a "pathetic little fairy" who lacks the most powerful thing - conviction. Angel replies that there is something more powerful than that - mercy. He causes Hauser to shoot himself, and to a remaining guard's query about what happened to mercy, he replies that they've seen the last of his. Later, Eve explains to the group that Gunn agreed to let the firm "enhance" him with legal knowledge (and Gilbert and Sullivan for elocution). Angel wonders how Gunn knows for sure that nothing else was done; he said that he was in the White Room and is sure. Eve tells the group that they needed a lawyer, and Gunn had "the most unused potential" - and he just saved the day without using violence. Wesley notes that they did disable the vessel and Gunn says that Fries has to lie low until the trial comes up again, and when it does, he can drag it out for a long time. Fred wonders if they're actually going to do good while they're there, and Angel thinks that they are. He opens an envelope he received earlier and the amulet he brought to Buffy in "Chosen" drops out. The amulet activates and a familiar face, Spike materializes in the office.

== Production details ==
This episode begins the same way "City of" - the series premiere of Angel - began: "Angel in a dark alley saving a damsel in distress from a vampire," Joss Whedon says. "We did this deliberately because we really wanted to call back what the essence of the show was. Angel is the kind of guy who goes into a dark alley, saves the woman, doesn't say what his name is and takes off." However, the new structure of the show means that, as Whedon says, "all of his heroism is falling by the wayside and he's a little bit pathetic." Production designer Stuart Blatt says Whedon asked him to build the new Wolfram & Hart large enough so that he could "walk all around with a Steadicam and never have to cut" then did exactly that; the second scene after the credits is a single, 3 minute, 45 second shot introducing all the main characters in their new setting. According to Whedon's DVD commentary, it took 27 takes to get this one long shot because "inevitably one actor is always going to have trouble with their lines, and it's usually going to be the one who's at the end of the take, because that's just my fate," Whedon says. Set designer Andrew Reeder was pleased to explore a different architectural style from the previous season's Art Deco hotel, saying, "it's contemporary, it's sleek... much more about someone like Charles Eames. Simple shapes, proportions, space light and form: it was very Japanese in the approach."

In the DVD commentary, Joss Whedon reveals that Alexis Denisof had a case of Bell's Palsy that caused the left side of his face to be paralyzed. Almost all the shots in this episode show Wesley from the right side or a three-quarters right shot.

James Marsters joins the regular cast as of this episode, replacing Charisma Carpenter and Vincent Kartheiser in the opening credits. Creator Joss Whedon explains the decision to bring in Mercedes McNab as Harmony - who has "worked for us for as long as I've worked on the show" - was because "she has been tirelessly funny, and engaging, and sexy, and delightful and it was very nice to bring her into the fold. She was long overdue to get into the mix, and we needed a blond, let's face it."

Joss Whedon, a fan of Law & Order, wrote Gunn's court scene using made-up legal jargon. However, when the scene was sent to a legal consultant they only made a few tweaks. "We didn't often know what to do with J.'s character," Whedon confessed. "He had a real sense of feeling out of place, so I wanted to show something from J. that people hadn't seen. Plus he looks really good in a suit." Coincidentally, J. August Richards starred three years later in a Law & Order spin-off series titled Conviction.
