= Darla (Buffy the Vampire Slayer) =

Fictional character from Buffy and Angel

- Buffyverse character
- Julie Benz as Darla in Angel
- First appearance: Welcome to the Hellmouth (1997)
- Last appearance: Dark Reflections, Part 1 (2017)
- Created by: Joss Whedon
- Portrayed by: Julie Benz

In-universe information
- Affiliation: Order of Aurelius; Wolfram & Hart; The Whirlwind
- Classification: Vampire
- Notable powers: Supernatural strength, agility, reflexes, and acute sensory perception

Darla is a recurring fictional character created by Joss Whedon and played by Julie Benz in the first, second, and fifth seasons of the American supernatural television series Buffy the Vampire Slayer. The character later appeared in the Buffy spin-off series Angel, making at least one appearance in every season. She made her last television appearance in 2004, appearing as a special guest star in the fifth and final season of Angel.

Darla is introduced in "Welcome to the Hellmouth", the first episode of Buffy the Vampire Slayer, in 1997. It is revealed early on that she is a vampire, initially in league with the Master, Buffy Summers' primary antagonist in the first season. Darla's backstory is disclosed in the episode "Angel", where it is revealed that she is Angel's sire (the one who turned him into a vampire) and former longtime lover. The character appears in numerous flashback episodes, until she receives a significantly expanded role in Angel. In Angel, she is resurrected by the evil law firm Wolfram & Hart in an attempt to weaken Angel. She later becomes intertwined in many of the story arcs in the second and third season. Darla becomes pregnant, a unique occurrence for a vampire. She sacrifices herself in order to give birth to her and Angel's human-like son Connor, ending her run on the series. However, Darla continues to appear in flashback episodes during the next two seasons.

The character was well-reviewed by television critics, with Eric Goldman of IGN saying "Not even dying (twice!) could keep Darla from being an important part of the story behind Buffy the Vampire Slayer and the spinoff series Angel."

== Conception and casting ==
Julie Benz originally auditioned for the role of Buffy Summers, but that later went to Sarah Michelle Gellar, who had previously won the part of Cordelia Chase. Benz was offered the small role of the vampire Darla in the pilot episode of Buffy the Vampire Slayer. Her performance was so well-received that her character appeared in a few more episodes. In an interview with TheTVAddict.com, Benz said of her casting: "I was supposed to die in the pilot, but about halfway through the pilot Joss Whedon was like, 'We're giving you a name and we're not going to kill you.' And he did that for a while until it finally came time to kill me, and kill me, and kill me and killed [sic] me." She later went on to say:

For me, I was a new actor to Los Angeles, didn’t know the TV business very well so I was just excited to work and play a vampire. I had no clue what I was going to do or how I was going to be scary. Until that is, they put the vampire makeup on me and I went into the trailer and smiled, which I thought was creepy. Joss always said he was intrigued that someone who looked like me and talked like me was like the scariest vampire ever. That's what he wanted, my sweet voice and demeanour until all of a sudden I'm just this vicious vampire."

Darla is first killed in the seventh episode of Buffy the Vampire Slayer. In that episode, it is revealed that Darla was once romantically involved with Angel and that she turned him into a vampire. Angel stakes her through the heart. Benz was asked to return to the role three years later, but not on Buffy. Joss wanted her to appear on the spin-off Angel, which focused on Angel's adventures in Los Angeles. Benz said in an interview:

I was shocked, really. When they sent me the script [for Angel] I kept asking, 'Where's Darla?' I remember calling my agent asking, 'Are you sure they want me for this episode because I can't seem to find me?' And then I get to the last page and there I am... naked in a box. Awesome. It was exciting.

When asked in an interview with Robert Canning of IGN about how she felt about being asked to come on to Angel after previously being killed off, Benz commented:

I was shocked. I just thought once you poof'd, you poof'd! I thought that was it. So when they threw it out to me that I was coming back... They didn't tell me they were bringing her back to life. They just sent me the script for the season finale for season 1 of Angel, when they rose me from the dead. I was reading the script, and half way through, Darla still hadn't shown up.

Benz went on to add,

I was like, 'Alright...' I get three quarters of the way through and I think, 'Maybe they sent me the wrong script...?' And then I get to the last page, and I was like, 'Oh my god! I can't believe this! This is so cool!' At that time I'd been committed to another project too. We didn't even know if I was going to be available or not. But it all ended up working out.

Darla appears in twenty Angel episodes, as a minor antagonist and later as a love interest of Angel. The character is known for dying the most in the Buffy The Vampire Slayer franchise. Benz later emphasized:

I just didn't know how it was going to happen. So when they sent me the script [for my last episode of Angel]—which I basically had to sign my life away to read—I was sitting in my trailer and I just started to cry. I thought it was such a beautiful ending, it was the payoff and just really brought her whole life kind of to that one moment. So I was really upset my last day of filming because I really thought it was over to me.

== Characterization ==
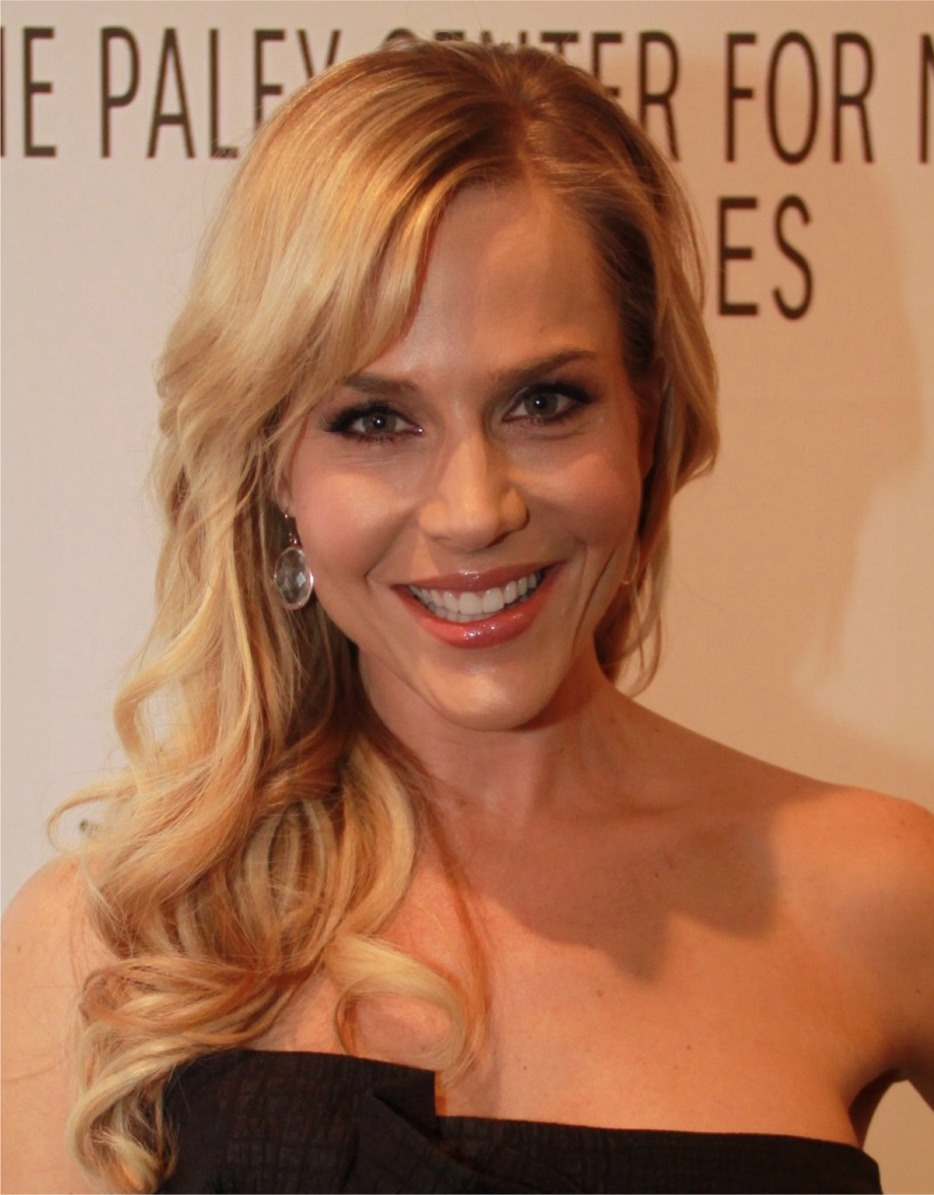
The transformation into Darla was complicated. Benz was not a fan of the process

Darla is presented in the series both as a human and as a vampire with, as Benz put it, generally "pure" intentions. In an interview with TheTVAddict, Benz said:

Darla's just misunderstood. Her intentions are pure, they're just kind of warped. From her perspective—first she has to eat—she just happens to eat people! Second, she was in love with Angel, and I always viewed Darla as the jilted ex-wife that could never get over being dumped. If you really look at her, you can have sympathy and empathy for her. In the beginning of her life she was a prostitute, Joss and I actually talked about that a lot, that she was probably abused growing up. She did what she needed to do to survive, she just lacked the people skills.

Achieving Darla's look was a struggle for Benz. She said: "Taking that makeup off, it was like having six layers of skin ripped off your face every time. It was miserable and the contact lenses were terrible. I don’t wear contacts and I don’t know how people do it, sticking things in their eyeballs all the time." The character's sense of fashion is vital to understanding her past. Benz says Darla is "dressed to the nines" in every time period in which she lives, and "she fully goes after a certain look. If she’s going to be living during the Boxer Rebellion time, she’s got the big Gibson Girl hair style and the beautiful kimono-style clothes." Benz points out that in the Buffy pilot episode, Darla—attempting to dress like a high school student—exaggerates it with a "little twist", wearing a Catholic schoolgirl uniform instead. "I think I influenced Darla fashion-wise in the second season of Angel where she was a little more classic-looking and tailored," Benz says, explaining she collaborated with the costume designer to transition Darla into a "hipper look" when she became a vampire again. Darla shockingly becomes pregnant in the third season of Angel. In an interview with the BBC, Benz admitted:

Yeah, I really felt at that point she was pretty strung out. Her whole world was rocked. She never thought she could get pregnant and then all of a sudden she's carrying this child and she's experiencing this soul for the first time in four hundred years. [There's] the realisation that as soon as the baby's born the soul's going to go away, and it's the first time she really experienced true love, so she was going through a lot emotionally. I just didn't think that she would have time to really think about how she looked. I don't think it was a priority, and so for me as an actor it was important that I reveal that. Not get caught up in my own vanity as an actress, and portray the character as where she really was.

In an interview with the BBC, Benz described Darla as strong: "I have an amazing stunt double, Lisa Hoyle who looks exactly like me. She’s just brilliant and fearless and she does about 90 per cent of the stunts. I think part of the element of Darla is how strong she is and how fierce she can be and Lisa definitely adds to that element. I would be a doing huge disservice to Darla if I didn’t allow her to do the work that she does and to help add to that element that’s so important to Darla, which is her strength."

== Storylines ==
Darla is born in the late 16th century in the British Isles. Her birth name is never revealed in either series, and Darla herself eventually forgets it. As a young prostitute, she emigrates to the Virginia Colony in North America and becomes independently wealthy but also contracts a fatal case of syphilis. By 1609, Darla lies dying in the luxurious house she owns. She scoffs at a "priest" who comes to her deathbed before he reveals his true identity: The Master, a very old and powerful vampire and the leader of an elite cult of vampires known as the Order of Aurelius. Darla despises the clergy and religion, a trait that follows her as a vampire. The Master turns her into a vampire and renames her "Darla", meaning "dear one" in early modern English ("darling").

Darla spends four centuries killing civilians, often accompanied by Angel (until his soul is restored), before appearing in Sunnydale. Her first appearance is in "Welcome to the Hellmouth", the first episode of Buffy the Vampire Slayer, which aired in 1997. She breaks into Sunnydale High School with a student who goes there. Darla first toys with the youth, then her face morphs into that of a vampire and she bites the boy. Darla later appears in the episode "The Harvest", where she participates in the attempted ascension of the Master. Darla's role in the series is more prominent in the episode "Angel", where it is revealed that she is Angel's sire and former lover. Darla bites an unsuspecting Joyce Summers (Buffy's mother), making it look as if Angel did it. She then attempts to shoot Buffy but Angel intervenes and stakes Darla. She later appears in numerous flashbacks, illuminating her involvement not only with Angel, but also with Spike.

Darla's role in the franchise increased dramatically after her resurrection by the law firm Wolfram & Hart in the final episode of Angel's first season, titled "To Shanshu in L.A." In the second season opener, "Judgement", Wolfram & Hart lawyers Lindsey McDonald and Lilah Morgan question Darla about her past. She talks of how she can feel Angel, and slowly her memory begins to return. In the episode "First Impressions", Angel begins having romantic dreams about his maker, which sap his strength. In "Dear Boy", Angel is shocked to see Darla walking the streets. When he tells his partners, Wesley Wyndam-Pryce and Cordelia Chase, they think he is starting to lose his sanity. During the course of a stakeout by Angel Investigations of a woman suspected of having an affair, Angel confronts the woman, who looks exactly like Darla. She claims she is DeEtta Kramer. When she runs away from him, she walks outside into the sunlight, meaning Darla has not only been resurrected, but is now human. However, Darla and Lindsey's plan to convert Angel back to evil fails. In the end, Wolfram & Hart bring in Drusilla to make Darla a vampire again after her syphilis returns and she starts to die. Ironically, she is turned back into a vampire as she accepts her fate after a failed attempt by Angel to save her. Drusilla and Darla unsuccessfully attack Angel and leave Los Angeles.

Knowing that Angel has been cursed so that if he ever experiences pure happiness, he will once again lose his soul, Darla later returns and sleeps with him, but her plot fails; being with her only brings Angel despair, as well as providing him with a new understanding of his role as a champion. Their one-night stand leads to an unexpected development for the both of them: Darla reappears in season 3, pregnant with Angel's child, despite the fact that vampires cannot normally conceive. Her pregnancy allows Darla to experience emotions that had previously been lost to her in the presence of the human soul of her unborn child. Admitting that creating life with Angel was the only good thing they ever did together, Darla makes sure Angel will relay that to their child before she stakes herself through the heart, sacrificing her life so their son, Connor, can be born. Darla turns to dust, but the baby remains. Darla later appears as a spirit, trying to persuade her son in an effort to save him from the renegade deity Jasmine's manipulations, as the latter's actions are bringing Connor into the same path both Darla and Angel had taken.

== Reception ==
The character of Darla was well-received by Eric Goldman of IGN. He said: "As the very first character seen on Buffy the Vampire Slayer, Julie Benz instantly made an impression as the vampiress Darla. For the next 8 television seasons, she would get to show many different facets of the role, as not even dying (twice!) could keep Darla from being an important part of the story and mythos behind Buffy the Vampire Slayer and the spinoff series Angel, the latter of which allowed Benz to greatly expand her character."

== Appearances ==
Darla has 31 canonical appearances in the Buffyverse.

=== Television ===
Julia Benz guest starred as Darla in 25 episodes.

Buffy the Vampire Slayer

- Season 1 (1997): Welcome to the Hellmouth, The Harvest, Angel
- Season 2 (1998): Becoming, Part 1
- Season 5 (2000): Fool for Love

Angel

- Season 1 (2000): The Prodigal, Five by Five, To Shanshu in L.A.
- Season 2 (2000–01): Judgment, First Impressions, Untouched, Dear Boy, Darla, The Trial, Reunion, Redefinition, Reprise, Epiphany
- Season 3 (2001): Heartthrob, That Vision Thing, Offspring, Quickening, Lullaby
- Season 4 (2003): Inside Out
- Season 5 (2004): The Girl in Question

=== Comics ===
Darla appears in 6 canonical issues.

Buffy the Vampire Slayer

- Season 10 (2015): Relationship Status: Complicated, Part 1

Angel

- Season 9 (2012): Daddy Issues, Part 2
- Season 11 (2017): Time and Tide, Parts 1, 3 & 4, Dark Reflections, Part 1
