= Charles Gunn (Angel) =

- Angel character
- J. August Richards as Charles Gunn
- First appearance: "War Zone" (2000)
- Last appearance: "Not Fade Away" (2004)
- Created by: Joss Whedon; Gary Campbell
- Portrayed by: J. August Richards

In-universe information
- Affiliation: Angel Investigations; Wolfram & Hart
- Notable powers: Experience in fighting techniques, guerrilla warfare, vampire hunting, and handling of weapons. Knowledge of both human and demon laws, and also demon languages.

Charles Gunn is a character in the television series Angel, created by Joss Whedon and first introduced by writer Gary Campbell in the episode "War Zone". The character is portrayed by J. August Richards and named by Whedon after filmmaker James Gunn and actor Sean Gunn, both of whom had worked with Whedon. Gunn is initially presented as the leader of a street gang that defends its neighborhood from vampires.

== Biography ==
=== Character history ===
Gunn grew up in the Badlands, an environment of poverty and violence, where he had to face many challenges. Gunn used his street smarts and fighting skills to protect his community from vampire attacks. As a teenager, Gunn became the leader of a group of street fighters who fought against vampires in his neighborhood. Possessing the mind of a military strategist and the strength of a brawler, life in the city hardened Gunn to the extent that his life became less important than the cause, resulting in him trading his soul for a truck in a deal with a demon named Jenoff when he was only seventeen because he believed he had no future (cf. "Double or Nothing").

=== Angel Investigations ===
Gunn is introduced in the season 1 episode "War Zone", when he observes the vampire Angel roughing up a blackmailer and tries, unsuccessfully, to dust him. Later on, a gang of vampires at war with Gunn's group attack their hideout, kidnapping several group members including Gunn's sister Alonna. Eventually, Angel wins Gunn's trust, but not in time to save Alonna from turning into a vampire. Left with no choice, Gunn stakes his own sister — a decision that haunts him through the series. Alonna's death had a profound impact on Gunn, causing him to re-evaluate his priorities and seek help from Angel. Angel recognizes Gunn's strength and often calls on him in battle or if he needs help protecting the people he cares about. Although he initially regards his time with Angel Investigations as a "paying side gig", Gunn eventually becomes a full-time member of the gang, gaining mutual respect for those he fights side-by-side with while finding his place in the world. However, his work with his new 'family' often leads to conflicted loyalties; in the episode "Belonging", Cordelia is accidentally sucked into a portal to Pylea while a member of Gunn's old street crew, George, succumbs to the bite of a vampire. Gunn feels responsible for his friend's death, believing it would not have happened if he had still been around to help fight. Yet even in his grief, he realizes he could not commit the same crime twice and allow Cordelia to suffer the same fate, so he joins Angel, Wesley, and Lorne to rescue her.

A short time after their return from Pylea, demons across the city are being massacred regardless of whether or not they deserved to be killed. Gunn comes to the conclusion his old gang is responsible for the deaths, led by a man named Gio who has a grudge against supernatural entities due to an unrevealed event in his past (cf. "That Old Gang of Mine"). He realizes his ties with his old life are gone and his loyalty now lies with the vampire with a soul. In a showdown with one of his lifelong friends, Gunn chooses the mission of the Angel Investigations team and finds the future he thought he would never have. He has friends, loyalty, respect, and a mission. He even finds love in the arms of the new girl, Fred Burkle, but his past still comes back to haunt him in "Double or Nothing" when the demon Jenoff decides it is time to cash in on a deal made years earlier by claiming Gunn's soul. The Angel Investigations are able to defeat Jenoff.

Fred becomes the most important person in Gunn's world, and in "Supersymmetry", he kills Professor Seidel (who deliberately sent Fred to Pylea) in order to save Fred from having to carry the burden of doing it herself. The guilt of what he had done for her plagues Fred, and instead of bringing them closer together, it begins the rift that leads to the end of their relationship. Although no longer romantically linked, Gunn and Fred continue to fight side-by-side, and Gunn has a fling with the electric Gwen Raiden in the episode "Players". When Wolfram & Hart want to cut a deal to have Angel take over the L.A. branch, Gunn is led into the mysterious White Room where he is exposed to the mysterious conduit of the Senior Partners, who impresses Gunn with his immense power. Soon, he undergoes a remarkable transformation at Wolfram & Hart.

=== Wolfram & Hart ===
Gunn underwent a procedure that gave him a deep understanding of the law and other skills, which made him a valuable asset to Angel's team. (cf. "Conviction"). When his mental abilities begin to diminish, Gunn, fearful of losing his new talents and respect, makes a pact with Dr. Sparrow and gets a permanent upgrade in exchange for signing to release an ancient curio stuck in customs. When this curio results in the death of Fred and the resurrection of Illyria (cf. "A Hole in the World"), a guilt-ridden Gunn willingly offers himself to take Lindsey McDonald's place in a hell dimension in order to obtain information on how to stop the Senior Partners (cf. "Underneath"). While the team has no clue how to free him, Illyria saves Gunn with ease. He then returns to the fold, changed and seeking redemption for his sins. In the show's finale "Not Fade Away", he spends his potential-last day alive helping Anne Steele out at her youth help center and then slays Senator Helen Brucker, one of the members of the Circle of the Black Thorn, but is seriously injured in the process. While preparing for one last fight against the army of the Senior Partners, Illyria tells Gunn that he has only minutes to live; he replies, "Then let's make them memorable". Joss Whedon later discussed the final battle in SFX Magazine: "Gunn is dead. Illyria fights on. Angel loses an arm. Spike gets Shanshu. And Xander loses another eye, which is funny because he isn't even there."

J. August Richards later revealed in an interview that Gunn was intended to have become a vampire either in Angel season 6 or in the proposed Spike spin-off movie, had either project gone ahead: "I'd probably have him come back as a vampire and then kill himself.", "That's always how I wanted it to end for my character".

=== After the Fall ===
In the 1st issue of the Angel: After the Fall comic series (which is the continuation of the Angel series), Gunn and a group he has assumed leadership of storm a stadium and kill Kr'ph, one of the demon lords of L.A., who has taken up residence there. The group frees humans who were forced to fight each other by the demon. Gunn then makes a suggestive comment to the demon's female captives. At the end of the issue, Gunn is revealed to be a vampire, having been turned either during or after Team Angel's battle with the Senior Partners' army at the end of "Not Fade Away", who feeds on the women and turns the "rescued" men into vampires as part of "Team Gunn".

However, in the second issue, Gunn insists that he is still a good guy. He resents being a vampire, though he is prone to murderous impulses due to his lack of a soul. He reveals that he blames Angel for his condition, believing he had allowed him to be turned, and that he intends to save Los Angeles to prove that one does not need a soul to be a champion. As part of his plans, he kidnaps the psychic fish Betta George and imprisons him, forcing George to tap into his psychic ability to freeze Slayers in their tracks and contact people outside of Hell/Los Angeles.

In a later issue, he is seen making mystical plans; the intent is to have Angel come to the conclusion he sent Gunn to die, then Angel himself will die moments later. As part of his revenge against Angel, Gunn destroys the Wolfram & Hart building, Angel's headquarters in the war with the Demon Lords, which also forces Wesley back to the Senior Partners for a short time. Gunn later bears witness to Angel's defeat of the Lords, hanging back to ensure that not all of the people are slaughtered should Angel fail. Shortly after the team moves back into the Hyperion Hotel, Gunn confronts them and reveals his vampire nature.

Upon seeing what has become of Gunn, Angel tells him he is sorry. Gunn says he figured he would say that and tells him to table that for now. Gunn takes Angel around his base of operations and explains what happened to him. When Angel sees that Gunn thinks he is doing the right thing, she cautions him that the beast is in control, not him. Gunn attacks him, angered that Angel thinks that Gunn isn't himself. Gunn proceeds to remove all of the magic that had kept Angel alive and realizes that Angel is now actually a human. Gunn decides to let Angel lie there and die slowly, only to be confronted by Wesley's "ghost", who reveals to him that the visions he has been receiving are from the Senior Partners rather than the Powers That Be. Ignoring this revelation, Gunn continues to attack his former friends, with his team of Slayers apparently staking Spike — although Spike is later seen alive thanks to Illyria's timeslips — before he is kicked out of a window by Connor while trying to kill Angel again. Confronting Illyria, he tricks her into transforming into Fred so that he can shoot her, reverting her to her true form in the hope that he can convince her to use her powers to rewind time so that the Fall never occurs, only for Illyria to vow to unmake time itself. Realizing that the Senior Partners cannot allow him to die, Angel provokes Gunn into killing him, thus forcing the Senior Partners to reverse time to the original battle in the alleyway and giving Angel the opportunity to save Gunn before he is born. The group subsequently takes Gunn to the hospital, where he falls into a coma. In Aftermath #18 Gunn is shown driving a sports car. Gunn seems to be recovering from his wound well, but was stated not to be ready to rejoin the team yet. In Aftermath #23 Gunn is spotlighted. It is explained how he was cured so quickly from the attacks at the end of the series, and he and Illyria come to a mutual agreement and strike a friendship of sorts. In the end, Illyria and Gunn take off to find adventure, slay demons, and find a new direction in their lives.

Gunn eventually returns to Angel Investigations, though he nonetheless faces multiple difficulties upon his return, as Spike and Connor still regard him as a traitor due to his actions in Hell and are distrustful of him. When Connor took over the leadership of Angel Investigations after Angel was captured by Innovation Labs, a biotech company seeking to duplicate Angel's status as an immortal with a soul, Gunn, while still loyal to Angel's mission, left the team due to escalating disagreements and arguments with Connor. Gunn departs with the intent of starting his own crew and fighting the good fight his way, though he nonetheless intends to return when Angel is found. However, his attempts to start anew are briefly halted when he is attacked by Eddie Hope, an ice-manipulating devil who has been hunting down people for crimes they committed while Los Angeles was in Hell, while at a diner.

In the Angel & Faith series, Gunn reconvenes with Angel, Faith, and Willow after they come to LA from London in the Family Reunion arc. Gunn has been sending reports to Angel on Connor's normal life as well as updating him on the status of his other friends from LA. Gunn stays in the Hyperion Hotel to protect the tear in reality when the other four enter Qour'toth. He appears pleased at the positive place Angel and Connors' relationship has finally reached.

== Powers and abilities ==
In the television series, Gunn is a normal human with no supernatural abilities, but he has strength and martial arts expertise due to his years as a vampire hunter, often described as "the muscle" of Angel Investigations. Episodes such as "Darla" and "Reunion" have proven that Gunn is also a talented and intelligent investigator. In season 5, he is given a "legal upgrade" by Wolfram & Hart, which gives him knowledge of all legal codes, both human and demon, as well as fluency in some demonic languages, knowledge of golf techniques and all Gilbert & Sullivan light operas. In the canonical comic book Angel: After the Fall, Gunn is depicted as having become a vampire, acquiring superhuman strength, speed, reflex durability, virtual immortality, accelerated healing, vulnerability to holy items and sunlight, and the necessity to feed on blood to maintain vitality. He claims that his "inner demon" is partially subdued by his earlier Wolfram & Hart upgrades. By devouring a prophetic demon, Gunn also acquired its power to receive visions, which he believes come from the powers but in fact come from the Senior Partners. At the end of the series, time is reversed, and Gunn is an ordinary human again.

Gunn has displayed extensive knowledge of comic books and is considered to be a fan of pop culture.

- In the episode "Supersymmetry", Gunn threatens a college student in a school bookstore by referencing the specific issue of Daredevil (#181) in which Bullseye kills Elektra, even quoting from the cover blurb, which reads "...One wins, one dies."
- When commenting on how fast Illyria appears to move when using her time-warping abilities, Gunn compares her to three different incarnations of the Flash: Jay Garrick, Wally West, and Barry Allen. The reference elicits little response from his confused friends, so he merely says that it was "like she was movin' really fast".
- In the episode "First Impressions", Gunn mentions that he has not seen a movie since Denzel Washington's portrayal of Malcolm X, for which he believes Washington was deserving of an Oscar.

== Appearance ==
Following his mental upgrade, Gunn sheds his street look for the sleek, professional suits of a legal powerhouse. He also lets his hair grow slightly after having had it shaved in all previous seasons, which comes as a surprise to Cordelia in the episode "You're Welcome". In the final episodes, Gunn comes full circle, returning to his roots, taking back his street clothes, and reawakening his purpose as a soldier in the fight against evil.

== Relationships ==
=== Romantic interests ===
- Veronica — Gunn had a romance with this girl prior to becoming a full-time member of Angel Investigations. She appears briefly in "First Impressions", in which her non-fatal injury at the hands of a vampire brings back painful memories and feelings of guilt about Alonna.
- Winifred "Fred" Burkle — Gunn and Fred fall in love and continue a strong relationship throughout much of seasons 3 and 4, which was ruptured when Gunn murdered a human being in order to protect Fred's innocence. Nevertheless, he retains strong feelings of friendship for her and is devastated by her death, for which he is partially responsible. Unlike the other characters, who usually referred to Gunn by his surname, Fred always called him Charles and continued to do so following their breakup.
- Gwen Raiden flirts with Gunn in her first two appearances, and they have sex in the episode "Players", when, with Gunn's assistance, Gwen gains the ability to touch people without harming them.

=== Friendships ===
- Wesley Wyndam-Pryce — During Angel's temporary absence from the group in season 2, Gunn and Wesley develop a brothers-in-arms bond. This friendship continues to develop but is strained by romantic rivalry over Fred (cf. "Waiting in the Wings"). The friendship between Gunn and Wesley deteriorates further after Wesley misguidedly attempts to kidnap Angel's son Connor and is accordingly fired from the agency. However, in season 4, Wesley is gradually reintroduced to the AI team, and the pair are friends again by season 5. The Beast's attack on Los Angeles requires Wes and AI to join forces, and Wes saves Gunn's life in their first confrontation with the creature. This friendship is again put under stress when the creation of Illyria (for which Gunn is indirectly responsible) causes Fred's death and Wesley stabs Gunn with a scalpel. The pair eventually reconcile.
- Cordelia Chase advocated for bringing Gunn into "Team Angel", and pushed for him to start getting paid as well as making sure the team began to see him as an equal. Gunn quickly began to respect her and not just think of her as a "Barbie doll", as he did in the beginning. Over the years, a solid friendship was formed.

== Appearances ==
=== Canonical appearances ===
Gunn has appeared in 95 canonical Buffyverse appearances.

Angel
Gunn was a series regular from seasons 2–5. He appeared in 91 episodes in total, including guest appearances in the episodes:

- Season 1 (1999–2000) - "War Zone", "Blind Date", and "To Shanshu in L.A."

Angel: After the Fall
Gunn has appeared in issues #1, #2, #4, #5, #8–#17, #23 and Angel: Aftermath #18

=== Non-canonical appearances ===
Gunn has also appeared in Angel expanded universe material such as comics and novels, most notable his own one-shot comic Gunn: Spotlight in 2006.
