= List of Angel episodes =

Angel is an American television series, a spin-off from the television series Buffy the Vampire Slayer which aired on The WB. The series was created by Buffy's creator, Joss Whedon, in collaboration with David Greenwalt, and first aired on October 5, 1999. It concluded on May 19, 2004, after five seasons with 110 episodes in total, plus an unaired pitch tape that was used to sell the series. The series continued in comic book form in Angel: After the Fall, Season 9, Season 10, Season 11, and concluded with Season 12.

In the United Kingdom, the series aired first on Sky1, and then, considerably later, on Channel 4 and, later, on Five.

All five seasons of the series are available as individual DVD box sets and as a complete series collection in Regions 1, 2 and 4.

== Series overview ==
Season	Episodes	Originally released	
Season	Episodes	First released	Last released
1	22	October 5, 1999	May 23, 2000
2	22	September 26, 2000	May 22, 2001
3	22	September 24, 2001	May 20, 2002
4	22	October 6, 2002	May 7, 2003
5	22	October 1, 2003	May 19, 2004

== Episodes ==
=== Season 1 (1999–2000) ===
No. overall	No. in season	Title	Directed by	Written by	Original release date	Prod. code	U.S. viewers (millions)
1	1	"City Of"	Joss Whedon	Joss Whedon & David Greenwalt	October 5, 1999	1ADH01	7.47
2	2	"Lonely Heart"	James A. Contner	David Fury	October 12, 1999	1ADH02	5.82
3	3	"In the Dark"	Bruce Seth Green	Douglas Petrie	October 19, 1999	1ADH03	5.58
4	4	"I Fall to Pieces"	Vern Gillum	Story by : Joss Whedon & David Greenwalt; Teleplay by : David Greenwalt	October 26, 1999	1ADH04	5.45
5	5	"Rm w/a Vu"	Scott McGinnis	Story by : David Greenwalt & Jane Espenson; Teleplay by : Jane Espenson	November 2, 1999	1ADH05	5.05
6	6	"Sense & Sensitivity"	James A. Contner	Tim Minear	November 9, 1999	1ADH06	5.72
7	7	"The Bachelor Party"	David Straiton	Tracey Stern	November 16, 1999	1ADH07	5.32
8	8	"I Will Remember You"	David Grossman	David Greenwalt & Jeannine Renshaw	November 23, 1999	1ADH08	6.50
9	9	"Hero"	Tucker Gates	Howard Gordon & Tim Minear	November 30, 1999	1ADH09	5.42
10	10	"Parting Gifts"	James A. Contner	David Fury & Jeannine Renshaw	December 14, 1999	1ADH10	5.64
11	11	"Somnambulist"	Winrich Kolbe	Tim Minear	January 18, 2000	1ADH11	4.77
12	12	"Expecting"	David Semel	Howard Gordon	January 25, 2000	1ADH12	6.62
13	13	"She"	David Greenwalt	David Greenwalt & Marti Noxon	February 8, 2000	1ADH13	5.25
14	14	"I've Got You Under My Skin"	R.D. Price	Story by : David Greenwalt & Jeannine Renshaw; Teleplay by : Jeannine Renshaw	February 15, 2000	1ADH14	4.66
15	15	"The Prodigal"	Bruce Seth Green	Tim Minear	February 22, 2000	1ADH15	5.45
16	16	"The Ring"	Nick Marck	Howard Gordon	February 29, 2000	1ADH16	5.21
17	17	"Eternity"	Regis B. Kimble	Tracey Stern	April 4, 2000	1ADH17	4.85
18	18	"Five by Five"	James A. Contner	Jim Kouf	April 25, 2000	1ADH18	4.83
19	19	"Sanctuary"	Michael Lange	Tim Minear & Joss Whedon	May 2, 2000	1ADH19	5.29
20	20	"War Zone"	David Straiton	Garry Campbell	May 9, 2000	1ADH20	4.92
21	21	"Blind Date"	Thomas J. Wright	Jeannine Renshaw	May 16, 2000	1ADH21	5.14
22	22	"To Shanshu in L.A."	David Greenwalt	David Greenwalt	May 23, 2000	1ADH22	4.52

=== Season 2 (2000–01) ===
No. overall	No. in season	Title	Directed by	Written by	Original release date	Prod. code	U.S. viewers (millions)
23	1	"Judgment"	Michael Lange	Story by : Joss Whedon & David Greenwalt; Teleplay by : David Greenwalt	September 26, 2000	2ADH01	6.09
24	2	"Are You Now or Have You Ever Been"	David Semel	Tim Minear	October 3, 2000	2ADH02	5.04
25	3	"First Impressions"	James A. Contner	Shawn Ryan	October 10, 2000	2ADH03	5.09
26	4	"Untouched"	Joss Whedon	Mere Smith	October 17, 2000	2ADH04	4.92
27	5	"Dear Boy"	David Greenwalt	David Greenwalt	October 24, 2000	2ADH05	5.40
28	6	"Guise Will Be Guise"	Krishna Rao	Jane Espenson	November 7, 2000	2ADH06	6.05
29	7	"Darla"	Tim Minear	Tim Minear	November 14, 2000	2ADH07	5.54
30	8	"The Shroud of Rahmon"	David Grossman	Jim Kouf	November 21, 2000	2ADH08	4.67
31	9	"The Trial"	Bruce Seth Green	Story by : David Greenwalt; Teleplay by : Douglas Petrie & Tim Minear	November 28, 2000	2ADH09	4.67
32	10	"Reunion"	James A. Contner	Tim Minear & Shawn Ryan	December 19, 2000	2ADH10	4.66
33	11	"Redefinition"	Michael Grossman	Mere Smith	January 16, 2001	2ADH11	4.11
34	12	"Blood Money"	R.D. Price	Shawn Ryan & Mere Smith	January 23, 2001	2ADH12	4.75
35	13	"Happy Anniversary"	Bill L. Norton	Story by : Joss Whedon & David Greenwalt; Teleplay by : David Greenwalt	February 6, 2001	2ADH13	4.33
36	14	"The Thin Dead Line"	Scott McGinnis	Jim Kouf & Shawn Ryan	February 13, 2001	2ADH14	4.51
37	15	"Reprise"	James Whitmore, Jr.	Tim Minear	February 20, 2001	2ADH15	4.45
38	16	"Epiphany"	Thomas J. Wright	Tim Minear	February 27, 2001	2ADH16	5.21
39	17	"Disharmony"	Fred Keller	David Fury	April 17, 2001	2ADH17	3.64
40	18	"Dead End"	James A. Contner	David Greenwalt	April 24, 2001	2ADH18	4.40
41	19	"Belonging"	Turi Meyer	Shawn Ryan	May 1, 2001	2ADH19	4.56
42	20	"Over the Rainbow"	Fred Keller	Mere Smith	May 8, 2001	2ADH20	5.03
43	21	"Through the Looking Glass"	Tim Minear	Tim Minear	May 15, 2001	2ADH21	5.18
44	22	"There's No Place Like Plrtz Glrb"	David Greenwalt	David Greenwalt	May 22, 2001	2ADH22	4.84

=== Season 3 (2001–02) ===
No. overall	No. in season	Title	Directed by	Written by	Original release date	Prod. code	U.S. viewers (millions)
45	1	"Heartthrob"	David Greenwalt	David Greenwalt	September 24, 2001	3ADH01	5.01
46	2	"That Vision Thing"	Bill L. Norton	Jeffrey Bell	October 1, 2001	3ADH03	4.83
47	3	"That Old Gang of Mine"	Fred Keller	Tim Minear	October 8, 2001	3ADH02	4.48
48	4	"Carpe Noctem"	James A. Contner	Scott Murphy	October 15, 2001	3ADH04	4.99
49	5	"Fredless"	Marita Grabiak	Mere Smith	October 22, 2001	3ADH05	4.53
50	6	"Billy"	David Grossman	Tim Minear & Jeffrey Bell	October 29, 2001	3ADH06	4.18
51	7	"Offspring"	Turi Meyer	David Greenwalt	November 5, 2001	3ADH07	4.45
52	8	"Quickening"	Skip Schoolnik	Jeffrey Bell	November 12, 2001	3ADH08	5.20
53	9	"Lullaby"	Tim Minear	Tim Minear	November 19, 2001	3ADH09	4.87
54	10	"Dad"	Fred Keller	David H. Goodman	December 10, 2001	3ADH10	3.81
55	11	"Birthday"	Michael Grossman	Mere Smith	January 14, 2002	3ADH11	4.30
56	12	"Provider"	Bill L. Norton	Scott Murphy	January 21, 2002	3ADH12	4.36
57	13	"Waiting in the Wings"	Joss Whedon	Joss Whedon	February 4, 2002	3ADH13	4.57
58	14	"Couplet"	Tim Minear	Tim Minear & Jeffrey Bell	February 18, 2002	3ADH14	4.10
59	15	"Loyalty"	James A. Contner	Mere Smith	February 25, 2002	3ADH15	4.36
60	16	"Sleep Tight"	Terrence O'Hara	David Greenwalt	March 4, 2002	3ADH16	4.50
61	17	"Forgiving"	Turi Meyer	Jeffrey Bell	April 15, 2002	3ADH17	4.31
62	18	"Double or Nothing"	David Grossman	David H. Goodman	April 22, 2002	3ADH18	4.39
63	19	"The Price"	Marita Grabiak	David Fury	April 29, 2002	3ADH19	4.28
64	20	"A New World"	Tim Minear	Jeffrey Bell	May 6, 2002	3ADH20	5.17
65	21	"Benediction"	Tim Minear	Tim Minear	May 13, 2002	3ADH21	4.69
66	22	"Tomorrow"	David Greenwalt	David Greenwalt	May 20, 2002	3ADH22	4.64

=== Season 4 (2002–03) ===
No. overall	No. in season	Title	Directed by	Written by	Original release date	Prod. code	U.S. viewers (millions)
67	1	"Deep Down"	Terrence O'Hara	Steven S. DeKnight	October 6, 2002	4ADH01	4.57
68	2	"Ground State"	Michael Grossman	Mere Smith	October 13, 2002	4ADH02	4.21
69	3	"The House Always Wins"	Marita Grabiak	David Fury	October 20, 2002	4ADH03	5.06
70	4	"Slouching Toward Bethlehem"	Skip Schoolnik	Jeffrey Bell	October 27, 2002	4ADH04	4.13
71	5	"Supersymmetry"	Bill L. Norton	Elizabeth Craft & Sarah Fain	November 3, 2002	4ADH05	3.64
72	6	"Spin the Bottle"	Joss Whedon	Joss Whedon	November 10, 2002	4ADH06	3.63
73	7	"Apocalypse, Nowish"	Vern Gillum	Steven S. DeKnight	November 17, 2002	4ADH07	4.25
74	8	"Habeas Corpses"	Skip Schoolnik	Jeffrey Bell	January 15, 2003	4ADH08	4.01
75	9	"Long Day's Journey"	Terrence O'Hara	Mere Smith	January 22, 2003	4ADH09	3.46
76	10	"Awakening"	James A. Contner	David Fury & Steven S. DeKnight	January 29, 2003	4ADH10	3.19
77	11	"Soulless"	Sean Astin	Elizabeth Craft & Sarah Fain	February 5, 2003	4ADH11	3.46
78	12	"Calvary"	Bill L. Norton	Jeffrey Bell & Steven S. DeKnight & Mere Smith	February 12, 2003	4ADH12	3.69
79	13	"Salvage"	Jefferson Kibbee	David Fury	March 5, 2003	4ADH13	3.72
80	14	"Release"	James A. Contner	Steven S. DeKnight & Elizabeth Craft & Sarah Fain	March 12, 2003	4ADH14	3.91
81	15	"Orpheus"	Terrence O'Hara	Mere Smith	March 19, 2003	4ADH15	3.60
82	16	"Players"	Michael Grossman	Jeffrey Bell & Elizabeth Craft & Sarah Fain	March 26, 2003	4ADH16	3.45
83	17	"Inside Out"	Steven S. DeKnight	Steven S. DeKnight	April 2, 2003	4ADH17	3.55
84	18	"Shiny Happy People"	Marita Grabiak	Elizabeth Craft & Sarah Fain	April 9, 2003	4ADH18	3.92
85	19	"The Magic Bullet"	Jeffrey Bell	Jeffrey Bell	April 16, 2003	4ADH19	4.09
86	20	"Sacrifice"	David Straiton	Ben Edlund	April 23, 2003	4ADH20	3.71
87	21	"Peace Out"	Jefferson Kibbee	David Fury	April 30, 2003	4ADH21	4.04
88	22	"Home"	Tim Minear	Tim Minear	May 7, 2003	4ADH22	3.95

=== Season 5 (2003–04) ===
No. overall	No. in season	Title	Directed by	Written by	Original release date	Prod. code	U.S. viewers (millions)
89	1	"Conviction"	Joss Whedon	Joss Whedon	October 1, 2003	5ADH01	5.16
90	2	"Just Rewards"	James A. Contner	Story by : David Fury; Teleplay by : David Fury & Ben Edlund	October 8, 2003	5ADH02	5.24
91	3	"Unleashed"	Marita Grabiak	Sarah Fain & Elizabeth Craft	October 15, 2003	5ADH03	5.03
92	4	"Hell Bound"	Steven S. DeKnight	Steven S. DeKnight	October 22, 2003	5ADH04	4.73
93	5	"Life of the Party"	Bill L. Norton	Ben Edlund	October 29, 2003	5ADH05	4.72
94	6	"The Cautionary Tale of Numero Cinco"	Jeffrey Bell	Jeffrey Bell	November 5, 2003	5ADH06	4.02
95	7	"Lineage"	Jefferson Kibbee	Drew Goddard	November 12, 2003	5ADH07	4.75
96	8	"Destiny"	Skip Schoolnik	David Fury & Steven S. DeKnight	November 19, 2003	5ADH08	3.96
97	9	"Harm's Way"	Vern Gillum	Elizabeth Craft & Sarah Fain	January 14, 2004	5ADH09	3.80
98	10	"Soul Purpose"	David Boreanaz	Brent Fletcher	January 21, 2004	5ADH10	3.30
99	11	"Damage"	Jefferson Kibbee	Steven S. DeKnight & Drew Goddard	January 28, 2004	5ADH11	4.34
100	12	"You're Welcome"	David Fury	David Fury	February 4, 2004	5ADH12	3.95
101	13	"Why We Fight"	Terrence O'Hara	Drew Goddard & Steven S. DeKnight	February 11, 2004	5ADH13	3.64
102	14	"Smile Time"	Ben Edlund	Story by : Joss Whedon & Ben Edlund; Teleplay by : Ben Edlund	February 18, 2004	5ADH14	4.15
103	15	"A Hole in the World"	Joss Whedon	Joss Whedon	February 25, 2004	5ADH15	3.92
104	16	"Shells"	Steven S. DeKnight	Steven S. DeKnight	March 3, 2004	5ADH16	3.68
105	17	"Underneath"	Skip Schoolnik	Elizabeth Craft & Sarah Fain	April 14, 2004	5ADH17	3.32
106	18	"Origin"	Terrence O'Hara	Drew Goddard	April 21, 2004	5ADH18	3.69
107	19	"Time Bomb"	Vern Gillum	Ben Edlund	April 28, 2004	5ADH19	4.21
108	20	"The Girl in Question"	David Greenwalt	Steven S. DeKnight & Drew Goddard	May 5, 2004	5ADH20	4.68
109	21	"Power Play"	James A. Contner	David Fury	May 12, 2004	5ADH21	4.02
110	22	"Not Fade Away"	Jeffrey Bell	Jeffrey Bell & Joss Whedon	May 19, 2004	5ADH22	5.31

== Ratings ==
Angel : U.S. viewers per episode (millions)

Season	Episode number																						Average
Season	1	2	3	4	5	6	7	8	9	10	11	12	13	14	15	16	17	18	19	20	21	22	Average
1	7.47	5.82	5.58	5.45	5.05	5.72	5.32	6.50	5.42	5.64	4.77	6.62	5.25	4.66	5.45	5.21	4.85	4.83	5.29	4.92	5.14	4.52	5.43
2	6.09	5.04	5.09	4.92	5.40	6.05	5.54	4.67	4.67	4.66	4.11	4.75	4.33	4.51	4.45	5.21	3.64	4.40	4.56	5.03	5.18	4.84	4.87
3	5.01	4.83	4.48	4.99	4.53	4.18	4.45	5.20	4.87	3.80	4.30	4.36	4.57	4.10	4.36	4.50	4.31	4.39	4.28	5.17	4.69	4.64	4.55
4	4.57	4.21	5.06	4.13	3.64	3.63	4.25	4.01	3.46	3.19	3.46	3.69	3.72	3.91	3.60	3.45	3.55	3.92	4.09	3.71	4.04	3.95	3.87
5	5.16	5.24	5.03	4.73	4.72	4.02	4.75	3.96	3.80	3.30	4.34	3.95	3.64	4.15	3.92	3.68	3.32	3.69	4.21	4.68	4.02	5.31	4.26

Audience measurement performed by Nielsen Media Research

== See also ==
- List of Angel characters
- List of Buffy the Vampire Slayer episodes
- Angel: After the Fall
