= Orpheus (Angel) =

- Angel episode
- Episode no.: Season 4 Episode 15
- Directed by: Terrence O'Hara
- Written by: Mere Smith
- Production code: 4ADH15
- Original air date: March 19, 2003

Guest appearances
- Alyson Hannigan as Willow Rosenberg; Eliza Dushku as Faith; E.J. Callahan as Old Craps Man; Jeremy Guskin as Cashier; Peter Renaday as Master's Voice

Episode chronology
← Previous "Release"	Next → "Players"
- Angel season 4

"Orpheus" is the 15th episode of the fourth season of the American television series Angel. Written by Mere Smith and directed by Terrence O'Hara, it was originally broadcast on March 19, 2003 on the WB network. "Orpheus" concludes the three-episode arc involving guest star Eliza Dushku reprising her role as the Slayer Faith, beginning immediately where the previous episode ended: Angelus starts to feed on Faith. However, she had deliberately poisoned her blood with a psychedelic drug, and the two pass out. In his coma, Angelus is forced to relive his alter ego Angel's good deeds with Faith at his side, as Cordelia attempts to stop Willow Rosenberg from re-ensouling Angel.

== Plot ==
After drinking from Faith, Angelus pulls away in shock as she flashes back to earlier, when she injected herself with a drug stolen from a vampire junkie at the demon bar. Angelus and Faith both collapse, unconscious. Gunn drags Angelus's body to the Hyperion Hotel, where he and Connor shackle Angelus securely in the basement cage. Wesley brings a barely alive Faith to one of the hotel bedrooms. Knowing Faith injected herself with Orpheus, an enchanted psychedelic drug that poses a serious threat to her life, Lorne berates Wesley for allowing Faith to purposely get bit by Angelus. Connor updates Cordelia on Faith and Angelus' conditions. Suddenly, Cordelia brutally shoves Connor into a wall in response to his constant talk about Faith. He's shocked and she tries to cover her behavior by blaming it on the pregnancy and crazy hormones.

Downstairs, Connor shouts at Fred and Wesley about the need for killing Angelus, when Willow Rosenberg appears at the door suggesting that she's a better alternative. Fred called Willow for help since she's the only one alive to have successfully restored Angel's soul. Willow wants to see Cordelia again and Connor reluctantly takes her upstairs. As Willow talks about the difficulties associated with ensouling Angelus, Cordelia secretly reaches for a large knife under her pillow and tries to get Willow close enough to strike. Willow realizes if they break the jar, they can avoid all the complications and free the soul. Willow rushes out of the room in time to unknowingly avoid the knife thrown at her, which hits the door instead.

In their shared coma, Angelus and Faith witness the 1920s-version of Angel rescue a small puppy from an oncoming car. Angelus is infuriated at being subjected to the memory again, and Faith realizes with glee that they're experiencing Angel's good deeds of the past. Next, a hippie Angel walks into a diner and selects "Mandy" on the jukebox, as Angelus complains to Faith about watching Angel's self-induced misery. A man barges into the diner and asks for money, but shoots the cashier when he doesn't react quickly enough. The shooter runs away, and Angel struggles with his desire to feed on the cashier, which wins out. The bite marks on dream-Faith's neck begins to bleed and she realizes Angel could have saved the cashier. Angelus watches on as Angel suffers with the guilt of feeding, enjoying Faith's pain as well.

Before Willow can begin her spell to locate the jar holding Angel's soul, the Beast Master's deep voice screams a warning to stop. Willow's magic overpowers the Master's, and Willow begins her spell as Cordelia works counter-magic from the bedroom. When Connor breaks Cordelia's concentration by trying to enter the bedroom, Willow is able to magically shatter the jar. Using the Orb of Thesulah, Willow and Fred begin the ritual that will give Angel back his soul. Dream-Faith finds herself in a dirty alley with Angelus again, watching past-Angel, having forsaken all human ties, feed on a rat (shortly prior to the events of the 1996 flashback in "Becoming, Part One", wherein the demon Whistler almost literally dragged Angel from the gutter—commenting on his rat-feeding habits in the process—and set him on the path to his supposed destiny as Buffy's ally and a champion of the Powers That Be). In a twist, past-Angel turns and addresses the twosome. Angelus and Angel face-off and begin to exchange blows, as Angel convinces Faith that life is worth living and she has to wake up. Faith disappears.

When Connor finally breaks into her barricaded bedroom, Cordy smashes a lamp over his head, then pretends not to have known it was him. Cordy deceives Connor into thinking Willow's magic is evil and threatens their unborn child. She tells him he has to kill Angelus to protect their family. Willow completes the restoration spell, pulling Angelus and Angel into one body, while Faith wakes up and rushes downstairs to the basement in time to stop Connor from staking Angel. She begins to beat up Connor until Angel wakes up and stops the fight. Later, Faith tells Angel that she is going back to Sunnydale with Willow to aid Buffy and her allies. After they leave, a very pregnant Cordelia comes downstairs and shocks the gang with the serious trouble they still have to deal with.

== Production ==
Director Terrence O'Hara says the fight scene at the end of the previous episode and the beginning of this episode is "probably my favorite just because of the content of the show and the difficulty." The scene was shot in an abandoned bank in downtown Los Angeles and employed scaffolding to make the fight "more vertical" according to producer Jeffrey Bell. O'Hara explains that due to Alexis Denisof's bad back, the show-motion shot of Wesley carrying Faith was a difficult one. The fight scene between Angel and Angelus, which took two days to film, was something that Bell had "waited to do for four years." It was made possible by a split screen and a camera lock-off, explains O'Hara. "We played back to match shot for shot. He was hitting space."

The scenes of Chicago in the 1920s were filmed on Universal Studios' back lot. O'Hara enjoyed the look of the classic cars, although many of the moving cars were actually being pushed by the grips "because they were very noisy," O'Hara says. Additional scenes showing Angel and Faith reliving portions of the episode "Are You Now or Have You Ever Been" had to be cut due to length.

Jeffrey Bell says, "we apologize for the big, stupid floaty head" that appeared during the magical battle between Willow and Cordelia. He explains, "We had really great hopes for it and it just became something you'd see on It's a Small World in Disneyland. Just not quite as scary as we had hoped." During the final shot of Faith and Angel on the terrace, which Bell describes as "a hallmark of a Joss Whedon show - all the good-byes and the sentiments without anyone ever getting sentimental" - Eliza Dushku came to the set with laryngitis and could not speak. "This scene was supposed to be first up," says O'Hara. "I begged (show runner) Kelly Manners to keep it to the end of the day and let her recover, and she did."

=== Acting ===
Producer Tim Minear had the idea to bring back actress Alyson Hannigan as Willow Rosenberg to re-ensoul Angel. This episode is Hannigan's third crossover into Angel; she previously appeared on the phone to Cordelia in "Disharmony", and delivered the news of Buffy's death at the end of "There's No Place Like Plrtz Glrb". Hannigan, involved in both American Wedding and Buffy while this episode filmed, was excited to work with her fiancé, Alexis Denisof, whom she met while the two were on Buffy. Denisof was also excited. "I feel like it's a play day. I have to keep reminding myself that I'm at work," he said. "My girl is here... really all I want to do is run over and give her a hug."

Terrence points out in the donut shop scene with Angel and Faith that, "The gunman here is actually Eliza's brother Nate."

=== Writing ===
The title refers to the Greek myth of Orpheus. A legendary musician, Orpheus followed his dead wife into the Underworld to beg for her return.

Asked how prison has changed the angry, aggressive Faith, Eliza Dushku says, "How would prison change anyone? There was something about the fact that she's a Slayer, so she wouldn't really be there unless she wanted to be, because she's got superhuman strength. She could have busted out of that joint if she really wanted to. But she and Angel developed this relationship. He was leading her down the road to redemption, kind of facing the things she's done and recovering from that, and hopefully being a better her. She's been in there, doing the time, thinking. She's still a tough girl, but she really has to suppress her demons a little more. In these past few shows, that's what we're seeing—her teetering on the line between the old her and the new her."

"It's a big arc for us," says David Boreanaz. He explains that Faith and Angel "really get along well together. They owe each other... That's why, when she hears Angelus is out, she automatically breaks out of prison. She doesn't even think it, she's out. Because of what he's done for her. And they share that common bond." He adds, "It's going to be interesting to see how Angelus relates to Faith, because he's never met her before and this is going to be fun for him."

== Reception ==
The Faith trilogy (beginning with "Salvage" and ending with this episode) was generally well received. UGO Networks called this arc "truly the high point of the entire season," although was disappointed in the frequent silences on the director's commentary. However, webzine PopMatters complained about the rapid resolution of seemingly unsolvable problems in the last quarter of this episode. "We're left thinking none of them is so terrible as they seemed," the reviewer wrote. "'Apocalypse' can only be uttered so many times before it starts to lose its urgency."
