= Reprise (Angel) =

- Angel episode
- Episode no.: Season 2 Episode 15
- Directed by: James Whitmore, Jr.
- Written by: Tim Minear
- Production code: 2ADH15
- Original air date: February 20, 2001

Guest appearances
- Christian Kane as Lindsey McDonald; Andy Hallett as The Host; Stephanie Romanov as Lilah Morgan; Julie Benz as Darla; Sam Anderson as Holland Manners; Brigid Brannagh as Virginia Bryce; Thomas Kopache as Denver; Elisabeth Röhm as Kate Lockley; David Fury as First Worshipper; Chris Horan as Second Worshipper; Jolene Hjerleid as Singing Lawyer #1; Wayne Mitchell as Singing Lawyer #2; Marie Chambers as Mother; Eric Larson as Internal Affairs Guy; Shirley Jordan as Internal Affairs Woman; Carl Sundstrom as Lieutenant; Kevin Fry as Skilosh Demon

Episode chronology
← Previous "The Thin Dead Line"	Next → "Epiphany"
- Angel season 2

"Reprise" is the 15th episode of the second season of the American television series Angel. Written by Tim Minear and directed by James Whitmore, Jr., it was originally broadcast on February 20, 2001 on the WB network. In this episode, Angel learns that during the impending Wolfram & Hart 75-Year Review, the firm is visited by one of the demonic Senior Partners. The demon wears a ring with the power to transport to the firm’s hellish Home Office, which Angel steals with the aid of a magically protective glove. Angel travels to the Home Office and learns it is on Earth. Depressed, Angel seeks solace in Darla's arms. Meanwhile, Kate's life falls apart when she is fired from the police force.

== Plot ==
Angel prevents a sacrificial ritual from being performed by two Wolfram & Hart employees, who are nervous about something called "the Review".

Meanwhile, at Angel Investigations, the team have successfully removed the third eye from the back of Stephanie Sharp's head. However, her mother Francine refuses to pay the bill as she believes it is "impossible" for a third eye to grow out the back of a skull, despite the fact that it was she who approached them with the problem. She and her daughter leave having successfully stiffed the gang for payment, and an exasperated Gunn leaves.

Angel goes to Kate for information about the Review, but Kate - under investigation due to her involvement with odd cases - bitterly refuses, showing him crime scene photos from Holland Manners' wine cellar, illustrating his involvement in the slaughter.

Lindsey finds Darla waiting for him at home, and she weakly tells him that Drusilla is not returning to L.A. He gives her a container of human blood; while he is in the shower she stops feigning weakness and searches his briefcase.

Angel turns to Lorne, who is having a busy night as Caritas is full of Wolfram & Hart lawyers wanting to have their destinies read. Lorne tells Angel that a Wolfram & Hart Senior Partner (manifesting in the form of a lower demon) is coming to earth for the historically deadly Review, and that the sacrifices and rituals are simply the lawyers trying to get brownie points with the Senior Partner before he shows up. Lorne also tells Angel that anything that can manifest itself on Earth can be killed and that something called the Band of Blacknil is important. Angel goes to leave, but Lorne stops him and reminds him that virtually every lawyer in the club really wants to see him dead.

At the hotel, Angel attempts to look up the Band of Blacknil but has little references to use as Wesley took the research material with him. Angel goes to the new office of his former employees, uninvited and unwelcome, barely acknowledges his former friends, and helps himself to a book. Cordelia refuses to let him take it and grabs it off him, but Angel grows cold and deadly, and it is clear he is willing to use force to get the book back. Wesley rises from his wheelchair and tells Cordelia to let Angel have the book so he can remove himself from the premises. As Angel leaves, Cordelia vents about him until Wesley catches her attention: stitches from his healing gunshot wound have torn in the confrontation.

Angel returns to the bookstore he visited fifty years ago in search of information on the Senior Partner. A decades-older Denver tells Angel that it wears a ring that allows passage to Hell. To take the ring, Angel needs a one-of-a-kind magic glove that would allow him to strangle the Senior Partner without being incinerated. Denver gets the glove from the back room, but before he can give it to Angel, Darla stabs him with a sword and takes the glove.

Facing a review board during an Internal Affairs investigation, Kate is unceremoniously fired. She self-destructively deals with her dismissal by drinking and knocking her accolades to the floor, pausing to cry at a picture of her father. Virginia breaks up with Wesley because she is concerned with how much danger he is always in. Wesley and Cordelia talk on the phone, both depressed about their lives and lack of work. Wesley tells Cordelia that things are going to get better, but it is clear neither believes it. Cordelia gets a call from Francine, claiming to have changed her mind and offering to pay; unbeknownst to Cordelia, Francine was threatened into calling by a demon that kills her after she tells him Cordelia is on her way.

Angel arrives at the Review, and when he spots Darla in the crowd the two fight while the Senior Partner materializes. Security guards attack Darla after Angel exposes her as a vampire by dousing her with holy water. In the confusion, Angel gets the glove away from Darla, dons it and flies at the Senior Partner's throat. The Senior Partner implodes, but the force of Angel's leap carries him crashing out the window. When he hits the ground, Angel puts on the ring, causing elevator doors to open in the foundation of the Wolfram & Hart building. Holland (whose contract extends well beyond death) offers Angel a one-way trip down to the "Home Office", which Angel assumes is Hell. After passing through nether realms of darkness and fire, the elevator comes to a stop and its doors open - right back where they started. The "Home Office" is Earth, the implication being that Angel can never rescue humanity because humanity is its own worst enemy.

Angel walks away, witnessing the despair around him. Returning to the hotel, he hangs up on a message from Kate, who is drunk and overdosing on pills. Angel finds Darla waiting for him and, realizing that he wants to feel something, anything, Angel kisses her. At first, she pushes him away, but he takes her roughly and soon the two are having sex. Later, as a storm crashes outside, Angel wakes with a gasp as he appears to lose his soul once more.

== Production ==
The Wolfram & Hart exterior is an office building in downtown Culver City, located across the street from the main Sony Studios lot.

=== Acting ===
One of the people sacrificing goats at the beginning of the episode is writer/producer David Fury, who later has a larger acting role in the fifth season episode "Smile Time".

=== Writing ===
In her essay entitled "Why We Love Lindsey," M.S. West points out a conversation in this episode that illuminates Lindsey's character. Darla asks Lindsey why he always showers when he comes home from work. "You're never dirty," she says. His reply - "I'm always dirty" - gives "insight into Lindsey, or perhaps a clear nod to the fact he doesn't lie to himself, either," West writes.
