= The Trial (Angel) =

- Angel episode
- Episode no.: Season 2 Episode 9
- Directed by: Bruce Seth Green
- Story by: David Greenwalt
- Teleplay by: Doug Petrie; Tim Minear
- Production code: 2ADH09
- Original air date: November 28, 2000

Guest appearances
- Christian Kane as Lindsey McDonald; Andy Hallett as The Host; Sam Anderson as Holland Manners; Jim Piddock as The Valet; Julie Benz as Darla; Juliet Landau as Drusilla; Evan Arnold as Shempire

Episode chronology
← Previous "The Shroud of Rahmon"	Next → "Reunion"
- Angel season 2

"The Trial" is the 9th episode of the second season of the American television series Angel. The episode was written by Doug Petrie and Tim Minear with a story from David Greenwalt and directed by Bruce Seth Green, this episode was originally broadcast on November 28, 2000 on the WB network. In "The Trial", Darla discovers that she is again terminally ill with syphilis, which was killing her before she was made a vampire in 1609. She begs Angel to turn her back into a vampire to halt the disease's progress, but instead he engages in a series of mysterious trials to attempt to win Darla a second chance at life.

== Plot ==
Gunn has located Darla at the Royal Viking Motel, but Lindsey has gotten to her first. Lindsey and Holland confront Darla with information about her health. Darla reveals to Angel that she is terminally ill and only has a few months left to live. Angel visits Lindsey, who reveals that Darla is dying from syphilis. The Host, Lorne tells Angel that the only way to save Darla is for Angel to survive three trials to save Darla's life.

Angel is advised by a valet, Jeeves, before being left in a room to fight unarmed against a large demon that has weapons. Angel slices the demon in two and chains the pieces to opposite sides of the room. For the second trial, Angel must cross through a room with crosses covering the walls and floors and fish a key out of a bowl filled with holy water. Finally, Angel is chained spread-eagle before a wall of wooden stakes and told that the third trial requires him to die in order for Darla to live. Angel is willing to give his life, and that is enough to pass the test.

Jeeves discovers that he is unable to cure Darla's syphilis as she had already been given her second chance at life through supernatural means. Furious, Angel attacks the room that surrounds them. Upon returning to the surface, Darla accepts her fate and Angel is there to support her. Lindsey and several large men break into the room and restrain Angel and Darla. Drusilla returns and while Angel watches, she makes Darla a vampire, again.

== Production details ==
Production designer Stuart Blatt says, "The long hallway we built with the crosses emblazoned on the floor and embedded on the walls was one of my favorite sets we'd ever done."

=== Acting ===
Actress Julie Benz says she suffers "horrible stage fright" when trying to sing. Executive Producer David Greenwalt convinced her she could do it; she claims it "took a lot of courage for me to go in and do it, 'cause I am not a singer."
