= Suli McCullough =

American comic-actor and screenwriter (born 1968)

- Born: Suliman McCullough; January 12, 1968 (age 58); Cupertino, California, U.S.
- Other name: Suli McCullough
- Occupations: Actor; comedian; writer

Suliman "Suli" McCullough (born January 12, 1968) is an American actor, comedian, and writer. He is best known for his recurring role as Dwayne "Mouse" Abercromie on The WB sitcom The Jamie Foxx Show, and his portrayal of "Crazy Legs" in the 1996 spoof comedy film Don't Be a Menace to South Central While Drinking Your Juice in the Hood. McCullough also portrayed the voice of a clown doll in another parody film, Scary Movie 2.

== Early life ==
McCullough was born in Cupertino, California, and graduated from Cupertino High School in 1985. He attended the University of California, Los Angeles.

== Career ==
McCullough has also had several dramatic roles depicting real-life individuals. He portrayed Tina Turner's oldest biological son Craig Turner in the 1993 biopic What's Love Got to Do with It, as well as civil rights icon Terrence Roberts in the 1993 Disney Channel movie The Ernest Green Story. Additionally, he was a writer on The Tonight Show with Jay Leno and has been the head writer for ESPN's ESPY Awards. McCullough was credited as a writer for the 73rd Primetime Emmy Awards, American Music Awards of 2021, and 94th Academy Awards.

== Filmography ==
=== Film ===
Year	Title	Role	Notes
1993	What's Love Got to Do with It	Craig Turner	
1993	Fatal Instinct	Reporter	
1994	The Fence	Bobby Styler	
1994	Terminal Velocity	Robocam	
1996	Don't Be a Menace to South Central While Drinking Your Juice in the Hood	Crazy Legs	
1996	The Cable Guy	Basketball Player	
1997	An Alan Smithee Film: Burn Hollywood Burn	S.L.A.	
1998	The Party Crashers	The comedian	
2000	Dancing in September	Warm-up Comic	
2001	Scary Movie 2	Clown	Voice
2002	Run Ronnie Run Kyle	Kyle	
2016	Dying Laughing	—N/a	Documentary

=== Television ===
Year	Title	Role	Notes
1990	A Different World	Clarence Peel	Episode: "A World Alike"
1991	Married... with Children	Dave	Episode: "Oldies But Young 'Uns"
1991	True Colors	Spencer	2 episodes
1993	Martin	Caller #4	Episode: "Do the Fight Thing"
1993	In Living Color	Child Actor	2 episodes
1994	The Fresh Prince of Bel-Air	Dexter	Episode: "Who's the Boss?"
1996	Encino Woman	Marcus	Television film
1996, 1998	Mr. Show with Bob and David	Various roles	2 episodes
1997	The Larry Sanders Show	Jack	Episode: "Pain Equals Funny"
1998	Seinfeld	Co-Worker #2	Episode: "The Burning"
1998	The Wayans Bros.	Shorty	Episode: "Brother Can You Spare a Dime?"
1999–2001	The Jamie Foxx Show	Mouse / J.J.	24 episodes
2000	Sammy	Voice	2 episodes
2001	Angel	EMT	Episode: "The Thin Dead Line"
2013	Real Husbands of Hollywood	Paparazzi	Episode: "Doing the Bump"
2017	The Linda Show LA	Small Pox	Episode: "Social Justice Warrior (...but only on social media)"
2018	The Zen Diaries of Garry Shandling	Comedian	Television film
