= Over the Rainbow (Angel) =

- Angel episode
- Episode no.: Season 2 Episode 20
- Directed by: Fred Keller
- Written by: Mere Smith
- Production code: 2ADH20
- Original air date: May 8, 2001

Guest appearances
- Andy Hallett as Lorne; Amy Acker as Winifred Burkle; Daniel Dae Kim as Gavin Park; Susan Blommaert as Vakma; Persia White as Agnes 'Aggie' Belfleur; Michael Phenicie as Silas; Brian Tahash as Constable; William Newman as Old Demon Man; Drew Wicks as Blix

Episode chronology
← Previous "Belonging"	Next → "Through the Looking Glass"
- Angel season 2

"Over the Rainbow" is the 20th episode of the second season of the American television series Angel, originally broadcast on the WB network. This episode begins immediately where the previous ends: Cordelia has been inadvertently sucked into a dimensional portal. She ends up as a slave in an alternate world called Pylea, until her owners learn of her precognitive visions. Back in Los Angeles, Angel, Wesley and the Host attempt to rescue Cordelia, while Gunn discovers he has alienated his old street gang.

== Plot ==
The group realizes Cordelia has been sucked into Lorne's home dimension of Pylea, which Lorne says he was glad to leave. Caritas, the bar he runs, was once the abandoned building where the portal from Pylea opened up. Angel reads from the book to reopen the portal, but it fails to open; Wesley's researching discovers that the portal can only open in hot spots and Caritas is currently cold. Lorne seeks help from a psychic friend in order to find a hot spot, but she won't provide the information until he agrees to go with the others to finish his business in Pylea. Two lawyers from Wolfram & Hart appear at Angel's hotel, informing Angel that the law firm plans to buy the hotel when the current lease expires. Angel vamps out and lawyers take their leave, but not before threatening to make Angel's life difficult. Angel leaves a message on an answering machine with information about saving the hotel in case they don't make it back from Pylea.

Cordelia finds herself in a new dimension, where she is chased down and captured by a demon who declares her a "cow", or human slave. Her demon owner forces her into a collar that can be used to shock her when she doesn't obey. As she later mucks out the stables, wondering aloud if she can remove the collar, a runaway slave warns her through a hole in a wall that she shouldn't bother fighting. Cordelia is unable to see that the woman is Fred from her vision, crazy after all her years in Pylea. Before any more information can be exchanged, Fred is caught and taken away. Later, Cordelia follows her owner, carrying purchases from the market, until a vision causes her to fall and drop everything. She reveals she saw a villager being attacked by a Drokken in her vision, and a crowd draws, declaring her cursed. Cordelia is brought before Constable Narwek and explains she has precognitive visions.

Angel pulls his car up to the gate of a movie studio lot, following Lorne's information that it is a psychic hot spot. Although Gunn had earlier stated that George's death made him realize he's needed in this dimension, Angel's depressing phone message persuades him to join the mission. Wesley reads from the book, and with final good-byes to L.A., Angel drives his car through the portal. The book falls onto the sidewalk as the car vanishes. As the car arrives in daytime Pylea, Angel rushes to cover himself before realizing the two suns are not fatal to vampires. Happy and amazed, Angel goes off to gather branches to hide the car while enjoying the rare opportunity to be in sunlight. After covering the car, the guys realize that the book is gone and that they'll have to find another way to get back home. In town, Lorne advises that they stay to the shadows, as humans are treated as slaves. The Host tries to get help from an old friend but is met with bad reception. Chased by villagers, the gang is eventually caught and tied up in the middle of town.

After the Constable arrives, Lorne is taken away for questioning while the rest are chained in a dungeon until they are sentenced. In the dungeon, the guys brainstorm for escape plans and then with his vampire hearing, Angel overhears a conversation about Cordelia and her "sight." Guards bring Angel, Gunn, and Wesley to the Constable, who announces they will all be killed. For their death sentence, they are brought before the Princess of Pylea... Cordelia.

== Production details ==
Production designer Stuart Blatt says the Angel location department had found a movie ranch with a standing set for a "Tijuana town," which they dressed for the Boxer Rebellion scenes of "Darla" and used again for the village of Pylea. He says, "it just so happens that the Chinese province town which looked a lot like Mexico also happens to look a lot like England, or Pylea or any other medieval pseudo Euro-space, alternative dimension with two suns kind of world". The set designers added timbers to the existing clay buildings, put thatching on the roofs, and created stalls for merchants and vendors. Blatt says their animal wranglers brought in "medieval chickens and goats and pigs and yaks" and old chariots were reconstructed to create the vehicles.

The scene in which Angel opens the portal to Pylea was shot outside Paramount Pictures, where the series is filmed.

=== Writing ===
Despite fan speculation that the Pylea episodes were due to Julie Benz being unavailable for the conclusion of the Darla storyline, writer Tim Minear says the writers decided they were "weary of the Darla drama" and wanted the finale to be something "totally unexpected" instead. Julie Benz confirmed that she left because the writers had "played out the storyline as much as possible."

== Reception and reviews ==
The "Pylea" arc, which begins with this episode and concludes with the season finale, "There's No Place Like Plrtz Glrb", appears ninth on Slayage.com's list of the top 10 episodes of Angel. Charisma Carpenter was praised for demonstrating "true strength as a comedic actress." However, UGO Networks felt that the episodes were "something of a disappointment" because the "Dungeons & Dragons style world" of Pylea broke the dark tone that had been established.
