= Through the Looking Glass (Angel) =

- Angel episode
- Episode no.: Season 2 Episode 21
- Directed by: Tim Minear
- Written by: Tim Minear
- Production code: 2ADH21
- Original air date: May 15, 2001

Guest appearances
- Andy Hallett as Lorne; Amy Acker as Winifred Burkle; Mark Lutz as The Groosalugg; Brody Hutzler as Landok; Tom McCleister as Lorne's Mother; Michael Phenicie as Silas; Adoni Maropis as Rebel Leader; Brian Tahash as Constable; Andrew Parks as Priest #1; Danan Pere as Rebel #1; Joss Whedon as Numfar

Episode chronology
← Previous "Over the Rainbow"	Next → "There's No Place Like Plrtz Glrb"
- Angel season 2

"Through the Looking Glass" is the 21st episode of the second season of the American television series Angel. Written and directed by Tim Minear, it was originally broadcast on May 15, 2001 on the WB network. It is the second episode in a three-part arc.

In "Through the Looking Glass", Angel and the others are still trapped in the Pylea dimension. Cordelia finds herself appointed ruling princess of Pylea by an order of priests and ordered to mate with a human-like creature called the Groosalugg, while Angel seeks to help Lorne the Host bond with his estranged family, which takes a turn when Angel saves a runaway human slave, named Winifred "Fred" Burkle, the same L.A. librarian who was sucked into Pylea five years earlier. Also, Wesley and Gunn manage to escape from the castle only to end up as captives of human Pylean rebels plotting to overthrow the monarchy.

== Plot ==
Angel, Wesley, and Gunn are shocked to see Cordelia has been crowned princess of Pylea. She jokingly demands their heads be cut off, but quickly restates herself. After she dismisses the guards, Cordelia recounts how she became princess due to her visions. Lorne confirms his people have been waiting for one cursed with the sight that will save them all.

Lorne takes Angel to his family's house, where Lorne's cousin Landok identifies Angel as a hero. Angel, who is made the special guest of their upcoming village feast, tells stories to the people of Pylea while Lorne is ignored. Landok offers Angel the honor of "swinging the crebbil in the Bach-nal," and Angel agrees to take part - before he learns it means beheading a human so the people of Pylea can feast on it. Winifred “Fred” Burkle is brought forth, but Angel refuses to kill her. The two are able to make an escape when Lorne begins to sing, causing severe pain to the Pyleans.

While perusing the castle library, Wesley discovers "the cursed one" will have to perform something called a "com-shuk" with a Groosalugg. He considers asking the priests to translate the book, until he realizes it is part of a trilogy marked with three animals - wolf, ram and hart - linking the priests to the evil law firm back in Los Angeles. Silas, one of the priests, arrives to inform Cordelia that the Groosalugg has been summoned and that the "com-shuk" is a mating ritual. Wesley, Gunn, and Cordelia try to escape through a sewer tunnel, but Cordelia is caught by the priests and dragged back to her throne. Heavily guarded, Cordelia worries about mating with the demon, until Silas introduces the Groosalugg, who is a handsome and muscular young male.

Fred leads Angel to a cave where she has been staying for a long while. Fred talks nervously as she crazily scribbles on the cave walls. Angel finds Fred's driver's license and realizes she is the girl from Cordy's vision. She doesn't believe him when he tells her of her life in LA and how she got to Pylea because it's been so long, she's doesn't want to believe. Angel is attacked by guards as he tries to lead Fred to the castle, and when he tries to shift into his vampire face, instead he becomes pure demon and brutally rips through the guard's body with his super-sized teeth. The other runs and Angel takes off as well, leaving Fred frightened and alone. Wesley and Gunn wander lost, until the demon Angel attacks them. It takes a while before Wesley can recognize Angel's tattoo. A short distance away, Fred coats her hand in blood and is able to lure Angel away from his friends with the smell. Demon Angel sees his reflection in water at Fred's cave and is suddenly motivated to switch back to human form. Gunn and Wesley are surrounded and tied up by rebels who want to send a message to the castle. Gunn and Wesley try to convince the rebels that they know the princess and suggest they use them to contact her. The rebels agree, but their idea involves decapitation. Fred comforts Angel as he painfully deals with the aftermath of being controlled by the demon inside of him. He concludes that his friends saw what he really was and now he can never go back to them.

The Groosalugg tells Cordelia that his human qualities make him unappealing to his people, so he battled with demons to end his existence, but after defeating them earned the name for bravery and strength. Lorne is brought before Cordelia for judgment and he is almost sentenced to death, but Cordelia pardons him and then kicks him out so she can be alone with her future mate. Cordelia explains to the Groosalugg that she is not a princess, but he doesn't believe her because of what he was told. Silas tells his fellow priests that the princess has requested paper so she can write proclamations and do good for Pylea. He doesn't like the fact that she has not taken part in the com-shuk yet. Cordelia's proclamation writing is interrupted by Silas who brings forth a large platter and orders Groosalugg out of the room. He tells her she and Groosalugg are just tools and she will do what she is told. Cordelia refuses to accept that, until she is shocked into silence as Silas reveals Lorne's head displayed on the platter.

== Production details ==
Makeup Artist Dayne Johnson says that this episode was one of the most time-consuming for the makeup department. The full-body green makeup used to transform Andy Hallett into a Pylean took three hours, and the dozens of Pylean extras required 14 makeup artists beginning at 2:30am.

=== Acting ===
Series creator Joss Whedon briefly appears in this episode playing Lorne's Pylean brother, "Numfar". Whedon wanted his appearance to be a big surprise, and so had his make-up done in another make-up trailer. When Andy Hallett, the actor who played Lorne, saw Whedon doing a "Dance of Joy" at rehearsal, he thought the unknown actor was "trash".

== Reception ==
The "Pylea" arc, which begins with the previous episode and concludes with the season finale, "There's No Place Like Plrtz Glrb", appears ninth on Slayage.com's list of the top 10 episodes of Angel.
