= Happy Anniversary (Angel) =

- Angel episode
- Episode no.: Season 2 Episode 13
- Directed by: Bill L. Norton
- Story by: David Greenwalt; Joss Whedon
- Teleplay by: David Greenwalt
- Production code: 2ADH13
- Original air date: February 6, 2001

Guest appearances
- Andy Hallett as The Host; Brigid Brannagh as Virginia Bryce; Matt Champagne as Gene Rainey; Darby Stanchfield as Denise; Mike Hagerty as Bartender; Victoria L. Kelleher as Val; Danny LaCava as Mike; Eric Lange as Lubber #1; Geremy Dingle as Student Clerk; Michael Faulkner as Guy on Stage; Norma Michaels as Aunt Helen; Frank Novak as Curmudgeonly Father; Al LeBrun as Man; Bob Jesser as Torto Demon

Episode chronology
← Previous "Blood Money"	Next → "The Thin Dead Line"
- Angel season 2

"Happy Anniversary" is the 13th episode of the second season of the American television series Angel. In it, Angel and the Host must stop a man who wishes to stop time itself after he learns his girlfriend is about to break up with him. Meanwhile, Wesley, Gunn and Cordelia attempt to find clients for their new detective agency without Angel.

== Plot ==
Wesley and Cordelia, cleaning up their new office, discuss their future as investigators without Angel, and most likely without enough clients to keep their business running for long. At the hotel, Angel awakes to the sounds of the Host singing "The Star-Spangled Banner" down in the lobby. He tells Angel about a man who came to sing at Caritas, and that when he read the man's aura, the Host was knocked out when he realized the world would be ending. Unfortunately, the man left before the Host came around and the Host currently has no idea who or where the man is.

The man singing at the bar was actually a physicist named Gene Rainey, who is working on a formula to stop time. His girlfriend, Denise, visits him and they talk of their plans for their first anniversary. Without any other leads on Gene, Angel and the Host check out karaoke bars and are pointed towards the college that Gene attends. After an unsuccessful attempt to test his formula, Gene leaves his work area and two Lubber demons emerge from the shadows to alter the formula Gene has been working on. Wesley, Gunn and Cordelia mope about their job troubles but Virginia stops by with food, champagne, and a case they can take to earn a lot of money.

Gene is successful with the initial test of his equipment. Angel and the Host check out yearbooks at the college library to look for the name of the man. Denise confesses to her friend that she has to break up with Gene because things aren't working out and plans to break up with him that night after sleeping with him. Gene overhears this and returns to the lab, dejected. While getting directions to Gene and the physics lab, Angel is attacked by the Lubber demons.

Finally, at the physics lab, it is discovered that Gene is gone and so is his equipment. He has plans to freeze time during a moment of love between him and Denise. Gunn kills the demon that he and the others were hired to protect a rich family from. Wesley discovers the real truth behind the murder - that one of the family hired the demon to kill one of the men and gain control of the family money.

Angel and the Host take care of several Lubber demons who tried to stand in the way, then rush to stop Gene before it is too late. Gene freezes Denise and himself in a moment of passion, but Angel is able to get past several more Lubber demons then stop the machine and undo the whole process. Gene says he didn't know the overall effects of his actions; he just didn't want to lose his love. However, Angel and the Host tell Gene that things need to keep moving on, otherwise it wouldn't be interesting. As Gene goes to get some beer, the Host tells Angel that this is the first time in a long time that he is connecting with someone. Angel reflects on how he treated his team, and feels bad knowing he left them out in the cold. At their new office, Wesley, Cordelia, and Gunn party in celebration of their success until a man shows up in need of their services.
