= Winifred Burkle =

Winifred "Fred" Burkle
- Angel character
- Amy Acker as Winifred Burkle
- First appearance: "Belonging" (2001)
- Last appearance: "A Hole in the World" (2004)
- Created by: Joss Whedon
- Portrayed by: Amy Acker

In-universe information
- Affiliation: Angel Investigations; Wolfram & Hart
- Notable powers: Genius-level intellect. Full knowledge of mathematics, quantum physics, and other sciences. Skilled inventor. Proficient in melee combat.

Winifred "Fred" Burkle is a fictional character created by Joss Whedon and introduced by Shawn Ryan and Mere Smith on the television series Angel. The character is portrayed by Amy Acker.

== Biography ==
=== Character history ===
Fred was born in San Antonio, Texas to Roger and Patricia "Trish" Burkle. When she finished college, she moved to Los Angeles for graduate school at UCLA. Originally majoring in history, Fred took a physics class with Professor Seidel, which inspired her to take another path. Around this time, she began working at Stewart Brunell Public Library. In 1996, while shelving a demon language book, a curious Fred recited the cryptic text out loud and was accidentally sucked into a dimensional portal to Pylea (her future friend Lorne was sucked into the same portal on his side and ended up in Los Angeles). It was later discovered that the portal was actually opened by Fred's jealous college professor, Professor Seidel, who had sent every promising student to it, essentially sending them to their death. Fred was the only one of at least six to return (cf. "Supersymmetry"). In high school or college, Fred was a marijuana user as shown in the episode "Spin the Bottle". In that episode, she asks Wesley and "Liam" for weed and was also revealed to have had to take a personality disorder test and to be something of a conspiracy theorist.

=== Angel Investigations ===
For five years, Fred spent an arduous life as a "cow", the Pylean word for humans who are kept as slaves, and then as a fugitive. The harsh life of solitude and serfdom took a serious toll on her social skills, as well as her mental health; when Angel meets Fred, she is curled up in a cave, scribbling on the already-covered walls, having seemingly convinced herself that her previous life in L.A. had not been real.

It was revealed that Fred had once been forced to wear an explosive shock collar. Fred's salvation comes when Angel and his crew arrive in Pylea to find Cordelia Chase, who had become trapped there. It is notable that when Angel's demon came fully to the fore, it attacked just about everyone but Fred – including Gunn and Wesley. Despite this shocking display of violence, Angel never seemed to scare Fred, and even at his most demonic, he never attacked her. In fact, her presence seemed to have a calming effect on him.

When Pylea is liberated, Fred accompanies Angel and the rest of the gang back to Los Angeles and stays in the Hyperion Hotel to re-adjust to life on Earth and regain her mental stability. Despite several traumatic instances, such as being held hostage by Gunn's old vampire-hunting crew, she adjusts quite well to "normal" life.

Her knowledge of physics and mathematics make her an excellent asset when researching and developing strategies. Fred quickly develops a romantic relationship with Gunn, which lasts roughly one year. She is also the object of affection of Wesley Wyndam-Pryce, who attempts to step aside after Gunn and Fred started dating, but is still drawn to her. Near the end of her relationship with Gunn, Fred and Wesley share a kiss, but after discovering that Wesley had been in a relationship – albeit a rather complex one – with Lilah Morgan, her feelings for Wesley cool considerably.

Eventually, Fred discovers that it was actually her former professor's fault that she had been trapped in Pylea, and indeed, Professor Seidel had attempted to trap her in another world yet again. Furious, she plots to kill him with Wesley's help. Gunn feels that such a brutal act, even against Seidel, will ultimately destroy her. As a result, in a battle where she is trying to trap him in a hell dimension, Gunn snaps Seidel's neck himself and drops the body into the portal. Unfortunately, this causes a rift between Fred and Gunn, and ultimately ends their relationship.

=== Wolfram & Hart ===
However, everything changes for Fred when she and the rest of Angel's crew join Wolfram & Hart. (While Angel accepts a suite of rooms at Wolfram & Hart as his new home, Fred, and maybe others of the inner circle, find a home in the Los Angeles area: hers is at 511 Windward Circle. This seems to be forgotten with the advent of Illyria.) Her memory is altered by a spell cast in season 4's last episode, "Home", and it is unclear how much of the events of seasons 3 and 4 she remembers differently or at all (everything specific to Angel's son Connor is definitely lost). Fred receives her own laboratory and becomes the head of Wolfram & Hart's Science Division. She is a major asset to the team; Angel consistently relies on her department to quickly and efficiently solve problems. After going on a few dates with co-worker Knox, Fred begins to have feelings for Wesley again. The pair are together for about a week, but the couple's happiness is not to last.

A mysterious sarcophagus, allowed through customs by a signature from Gunn, appears in the lab. As Fred examines it, a hole opens in the cover and a breath of wind blows into her face. It turns out that the sarcophagus is a holding cell for one of the original, pure-breed demons known as the Old Ones, which is predestined to rise again. The air Fred inhales is actually Illyria's essence, which immediately begins a parasitic existence in her body, eating away at it and making her a shell. Worse still, Knox had worshipped Illyria for years and worked at Wolfram & Hart for the sole purpose of bringing the demon back. Because of his affections for Fred, he chose her as the only one "worthy" to house his god.

As Angel and Spike travel to England to find a cure, Wesley remains in Fred's bedroom with her, comforting her as she fights bravely, but slowly begins to die. Angel learns that the only way to save Fred would be to draw Illyria back to the Deeper Well in England by using her sarcophagus as a beacon. However, thousands of others would die as Illyria's essence cut across the world back to the Well. Thus, Angel and Spike are forced to do nothing, deciding that Fred would not want this.

As she lies dying, Fred's mind begins to give way. Nearing the end, she panics, stating that Feigenbaum, a stuffed rabbit named for mathematical physicist Mitchell Feigenbaum who studied chaos theory, should be there. When Wesley asks her who Feigenbaum is, Fred replies that she doesn't know. Cradling her in his arms, Wesley stays with Fred until the moment she dies, after which her body is taken over by Illyria. "Wesley, why can't I stay?" are Fred's last words.

According to Dr. Sparrow, Fred's soul is consumed by the fires of resurrection, which Wesley interprets upon overhearing as soul destruction, seemingly making it impossible for her to return from the dead or enjoy an afterlife, although the specifics of this process are not elaborated. Later, though, Illyria states that there are remnants of Fred in the form of her memories, which are a source of confusion for Illyria. On occasion, Illyria takes on the appearance of Fred in order to go about unnoticed and to deal with Fred's parents. When Wesley dies, Illyria takes on Fred's form to comfort him and because she has Fred's form, the evil warlock Cyvus Vail underestimates her and she easily kills him.

Had Angel gotten a sixth season, Joss Whedon originally intended for Fred and Illyria to either be split in two as revealed by Amy Acker in an interview: "As I’m playing this new character now, it was just some stuff that he was going to do with her and bringing Fred back and getting to work with both characters", or for Illyria to take on more and more of Fred's memories.

=== After the Fall ===
(This section does not describe the character in the television series, but rather a character from a series of books published after the series ended.)

Fred seemingly reappears in the fifth, sixth and ninth issues of Angel: After The Fall, manifesting as a transformation of Illyria into not just the physical appearance of Fred, but also her personality. This happens a first time upon the initial fusion of Hell and L.A. and then a second time upon a reunion of Illyria and Wesley. Issue #9 reveals that the Illyria and Fred essences have been struggling for dominance over their shared body, and that Spike has been trying to suppress Fred's manifestations (even going so far as to ask Angel for help), and admits that he would have kept Illyria away from the battle had he known Wesley was going to be present. It is later revealed in Spike: After the Fall that seeing someone Fred cared for triggers the change, while dangerous situations transform her back into Illyria. However, issue #14 explains that the Fred manifestations were just Illyria's interpretation of Fred; with these remnants lost, Illyria reverts to her true form. Later the telepath Betta George puts Wesley and Spike's memories (of Fred) into Illyria's brain to make her question her own actions. Illyria later tries to behave in such a way as Fred would have wanted, and has taken on more of her characteristics (for example, in the After the Fall Epilogue she has scrawled on the walls of her rooms as Fred did, albeit listing methods of killing).

After the Senior Partners rewind time after Angel is killed by Gunn, Angel renames a wing of the L.A. public library the "Burkle Wyndam-Pryce Wing" in honor of Fred and Wesley.

=== Buffy the Vampire Slayer Season Nine ===
In Buffy the Vampire Slayer Season Nine, Illyria is drained of her mystical energy and powers and is stuck in the physical appearance of Fred. Illyria believes she should be dead and something inside her must be keeping her alive, and is able to scientifically read graphs to determine why Dawn Summers is dying. Illyria expresses human compassion for Severin, the person who drained her and who is now about to explode with power. Illyria stays with Severin as he uses his powers to restore magic to the world which also vaporizes himself and Illyria. Scott Allie later stated it was intentionally left open to interpretation as to whether Fred was influencing Illyria.

Buffy later expresses regret to her noble companion Eldre Koh on the need to destroy Illyria. Koh casts doubt on Buffy's knowledge of the elder ones.

=== Resurrection ===
Fred is later discovered alive on the streets of London by Angel. It transpires that, when magic was restored, many aspects of the supernatural were "reset", resulting in the resurrection of both Fred and Illyria, sharing the same body. Fred and Illyria thereafter remain with Angel for the remainder of Season 10 and throughout Angel Season 11.

== Powers and abilities ==
Fred is a normal human woman with no supernatural abilities; her brilliant mathematical mind, immense knowledge of quantum physics and science, and a natural ability in designing inventions make her an important asset of Angel's team; Wesley once says, while addressing most of Angel's crew, "She's smarter than all of us put together". Due to spending so many years in Pylea, she also has a limited knowledge of the Pylean language and culture.

During this time, Fred also acquires some reasonably good fighting skills, mainly with weapons such as stakes, guns, swords, knives, etc. Later, when Jasmine takes over Los Angeles, she's forced to face down all of Los Angeles on her own, and it is shown that she is also able to hold her own unarmed, effortlessly taking out a few armed Jasminites, including one armed SWAT member.

It's seen in season 3 that she likes plants, actually talking to them during her period of mild insanity. In the episode "Spin the Bottle," while she's under the effect of a magical spell, Fred is briefly fascinated with a fern. After undergoing the transformation to Illyria, she can talk to plants while at full power.

Fred is also portrayed as an innocent, unassuming young woman, which often leads people to underestimate her. On many occasions, she has used this to her advantage, such as shocking Connor with a stun gun and knocking out a suspicious lab assistant at Wolfram & Hart or in the third season in "That Old Gang of Mine" when she tricks Gunn's old gang into thinking she was going to kill Angel. Also, she shows signs of great inner strength and an innate ability to survive on her own despite overwhelming circumstances. This is shown in season 4 as she attempts to flee from Jasmine's followers, and earlier with her experiences in Pylea.

== Appearances ==
=== Canonical appearances ===
Fred has 123 canonical appearances in the Buffyverse.

==== Television ====
Fred appeared in 70 episodes of television.

- Angel (2001–04): Amy Acker guest starred as Fred in 4 episodes of season 2 ("Belonging", "Over the Rainbow", "Through the Looking Glass", "There's No Place Like Plrtz Glrb"). Acker was promoted to series regular for season 3, appearing in every episode in some form for the remainder of the series.

==== Comics ====
Fred appeared in 53 canonical issues of comics.

- Angel: After the Fall (2007–09): After the Fall, Parts 2–17, After the Fall: Epilogue
- Spike: After the Fall (2008): All issues
- Angel & Faith: Season Ten (2014–16): Lost and Found, Part 5 to A Tale of Two Families, Part 5
- Angel: Season Eleven (2017): All issues
- Buffy the Vampire Slayer: Season Twelve (2018): All issues

=== Non-canonical appearances ===
Fred also appears in the Angel expanded universe. She is featured in a number of novels such as Sanctuary, The Longest Night, and Nemesis.
