= The Thin Dead Line =

- Angel episode
- Episode no.: Season 2 Episode 14
- Directed by: Scott McGinnis
- Written by: Jim Kouf; Shawn Ryan
- Production code: 2ADH14
- Original air date: February 13, 2001

Guest appearances
- Elisabeth Röhm as Kate Lockley; Julia Lee as Anne Steele; Mushond Lee as Jackson; Jarrod Crawford as Rondell; Cory Hardrict as Ray; Leah Pipes as Stephanie; Kyle Davis as Kenny; Camille Mana as Les; Darin Cooper as Police Officer; Brenda Price as Callie; Darris Love as George; Matthew James as Merle; Geoff Koch as Street Cop; Jerry Giles as Desk Sergeant; Steven Barr as Captain; Suli McCullough as EMT; Marie Chambers as Mother

Episode chronology
← Previous "Happy Anniversary"	Next → "Reprise"
- Angel season 2

"The Thin Dead Line" is the 14th episode of the second season of the American television series Angel. Co-written by Jim Kouf and Shawn Ryan and directed by Scott McGinnis, it was originally broadcast on February 13, 2001 on the WB network. In "The Thin Dead Line", Anne, the administrator of a homeless shelter, asks Gunn to investigate a squad of zombie policemen who have been assaulting street kids. While Angel teams up with Detective Kate Lockley to investigate the source of the undead cops, Wesley ends up getting shot by one of the policemen and Gunn, Anne and some street kids hole up in the shelter while the zombie policemen try to claw their way in.

== Plot ==
A friend of Virginia brings her daughter to the soon-to-be-renamed Angel Investigations, asking them to remove the eye that grew out of the back of her head after she was attacked by an unseen assailant. Wesley assures the mother that they will find a way to get rid of the eye. Meanwhile, Angel is feeling the increasing weight of his self-imposed solitude. As he walks round the hotel lobby and stands at the desk where his team used to gather, he can't help but feel lonelier than ever and in a fit of anger he shoves a pile of papers off the desk.

At a teen shelter, two teens show up after curfew in search of safety, and their fear convinces shelter administrator Anne to make an exception to the rules. Kenny explains that he and Len were unfairly attacked by a policeman, which has been happening to other street kids as well. Anne takes the problem to Gunn at Angel Investigations. He accompanies her back to the shelter and questions the kids about the incidents with the police. Angel, who has surreptitiously trailed Gunn, is attacked by a policeman while standing outside. Angel fights back, but the officer rises every time he's knocked down, until the vampire kicks the cop's head completely off and even then, the head keeps talking for a moment. When Angel asks Detective Kate Lockley to look up the dead cop's badge, she finds that he's been dead for six months. More sleuthing reveals that someone is putting dead cops back on the streets as zombies.

Cordelia rants about Gunn's decision to call in several members of his old crew to deal with the police, but she and Wesley resolve to go back him up anyway. They find Gunn and his friends secretly filming their exchange with a police officer, to demonstrate that cops are reacting violently without just cause. Wesley tries to save Gunn, but the cop turns and shoots him. A struggle takes place and George shoots the cop. The three men move Wesley to safety as the cop sits up, seemingly unaffected by the bullets. Gunn and friends get Wesley into an ambulance, but as they're driving away, several police cars get in the way. When the driver is shot, Gunn is forced to drive the ambulance. He eventually stops at the shelter and carries Wesley inside with the EMT, who warns that Wesley needs to get to a hospital fast. The teens barricade the shelter with everything they can find as an army of dead cops gather outside. The zombie cops force their way inside the shelter through the windows and doors, hurting several teens in the process.

Angel visits the precinct where the zombie cops were from. The police captain confesses that he has been using supernatural means to return good cops to the streets and protect previously violence-ridden neighborhoods. Angel finds a zombie statue and smashes it, returning all the zombie cops to their former dead, decaying states.

Kate and Angel discuss the ambiguous ramifications of their victory for the neighborhood - although the killer zombies are gone, the criminals that they drove out are now free to return - and Kate confides in Angel that the job is making her crazy. While standing outside Wesley's hospital room as he recovers from his gunshot wound, Angel encounters Cordelia, who tells him he should just stay away from them.

== Production ==
In an essay examining the use of cinematic effects of time on Angel, Tammy Kinsey points out the cut sequence in this episode when Gunn pulls up to the shelter after Wesley has been shot. Although upon normal viewing it appears to simply be a few flashes of color, when played slowly it reveals itself as a shot of lightning over a field, a negative image of the scene itself, a flash of light, then a return to the positive image of the scene. The effect, Kinsey argues, is that the viewer experiences a "forced pause, not unlike the musical notation of a beat" which gives an unconscious impression of the following material.
