= Angel season 2 =

Angel
- Season 2
- Region 1 Season 2 DVD cover
- Showrunners: Joss Whedon; David Greenwalt
- Starring: David Boreanaz; Charisma Carpenter; Alexis Denisof; J. August Richards
- No. of episodes: 22

Release
- Original network: The WB
- Original release: September 26, 2000 – May 22, 2001

Season chronology
- ← Previous; Season 1 Next → Season 3

The second season of the television series Angel, the spin-off of Buffy the Vampire Slayer, premiered on September 26, 2000, on The WB and concluded its 22-episode season on May 22, 2001. It maintained its previous timeslot, airing Tuesdays at 9:00 pm ET, following Buffy.

== Cast and characters ==
=== Main cast ===
- David Boreanaz as Angel
- Charisma Carpenter as Cordelia Chase
- Alexis Denisof as Wesley Wyndam-Pryce
- J. August Richards as Charles Gunn

=== Recurring cast ===
- Andy Hallett as Lorne
- Julie Benz as Darla
- Christian Kane as Lindsey McDonald
- Stephanie Romanov as Lilah Morgan
- Sam Anderson as Holland Manners
- Elisabeth Röhm as Kate Lockley
- Juliet Landau as Drusilla
- Amy Acker as Winifred "Fred" Burkle
- Brigid Brannagh as Virginia Bryce
- Matthew James as Merl
- Julia Lee as Anne Steele
- Mark Lutz as Groosalugg

=== Guest cast ===
- Eliza Dushku as Faith
- Daniel Dae Kim as Gavin Park
- James Marsters as Spike
- Mercedes McNab as Harmony Kendall
- Mark Metcalf as The Master
- Alyson Hannigan as Willow Rosenberg

== Crew ==
Series creators Joss Whedon and David Greenwalt served as executive producers, while Greenwalt would serve as the series' showrunner as Whedon was running Buffy. Whedon didn't write a script for the season, although he did write the stories to "Judgment" and "Happy Anniversary", directed the fourth episode "Untouched" and even acted in the season's penultimate episode as Lorne's dancing cousin Numfar. Buffy writer/producer Marti Noxon served as consulting producer, with other Buffy writers Jane Espenson, Douglas Petrie and David Fury were asked to write freelance scripts.

Tim Minear (supervising producer, promoted to co-executive producer midseason) and Jim Kouf (consulting producer) were the only writers kept on the staff. Minear ended up writing the most episodes of the season, including important episodes during the Angel/Darla story arc including "Darla", "The Trial", "Reunion", "Reprise" and "Epiphany". "Darla" also counted as Minear's directorial debut. Mere Smith, who was a script coordinator during the first season was promoted to a staff writer, and began writing episodes. Shawn Ryan was hired for the season and also served as a producer.

James A. Contner (also co-producer) directed the highest number of episodes in the second season, directing three episodes. David Greenwalt directed two, including the season finale.

== Episodes ==
No. overall	No. in season	Title	Directed by	Written by	Original release date	Prod. code	U.S. viewers (millions)
23	1	"Judgment"	Michael Lange	Story by : Joss Whedon & David Greenwalt; Teleplay by : David Greenwalt	September 26, 2000	2ADH01	6.09
After accidentally killing her protector, Angel champions a pregnant woman being hunted down by demons.
24	2	"Are You Now or Have You Ever Been"	David Semel	Tim Minear	October 3, 2000	2ADH02	5.04
In the 1950s, Angel aids a woman living on the lam in the Hyperion Hotel, an establishment with a long history of death and mayhem. In the present, Angel returns to the Hyperion and tracks the demon he refused to stop 50 years earlier.
25	3	"First Impressions"	James A. Contner	Shawn Ryan	October 10, 2000	2ADH03	5.09
Angel encounters an amorous Darla in his dreams. Meanwhile, Cordelia vows to protect Gunn.
26	4	"Untouched"	Joss Whedon	Mere Smith	October 17, 2000	2ADH04	4.92
Angel attempts to help a girl with telekinetic powers before she falls into the hands of Wolfram and Hart.
27	5	"Dear Boy"	David Greenwalt	David Greenwalt	October 24, 2000	2ADH05	5.40
At the behest of Wolfram & Hart, Darla attempts to unbalance Angel enough to force him to embrace his dark side.
28	6	"Guise Will Be Guise"	Krishna Rao	Jane Espenson	November 7, 2000	2ADH06	6.05
Angel meets a Swami to end his obsession with Darla. Wesley assumes Angel's identity and plays bodyguard.
29	7	"Darla"	Tim Minear	Tim Minear	November 14, 2000	2ADH07	5.54
Angel is desperate to rescue Darla from the clutches of Wolfram & Hart. Darla remembers her past.
30	8	"The Shroud of Rahmon"	David Grossman	Jim Kouf	November 21, 2000	2ADH08	4.67
Angel goes undercover with Gunn to prevent a mind-altering Shroud from falling into the wrong hands.
31	9	"The Trial"	Bruce Seth Green	Story by : David Greenwalt; Teleplay by : Douglas Petrie & Tim Minear	November 28, 2000	2ADH09	4.67
Learning that Darla is dying, Angel refuses to turn her into a vampire. Instead, he undertakes a series of mystical ordeals in which he must ultimately sacrifice his own life for hers.
32	10	"Reunion"	James A. Contner	Tim Minear & Shawn Ryan	December 19, 2000	2ADH10	4.66
The newly revamped deadly duo of Drusilla and Darla hit the streets of LA. and Angel is frantic.
33	11	"Redefinition"	Michael Grossman	Mere Smith	January 16, 2001	2ADH11	4.11
After firing his staff and cutting himself off from all help, Angel takes on Darla and Drusilla.
34	12	"Blood Money"	R.D. Price	Shawn Ryan & Mere Smith	January 23, 2001	2ADH12	4.75
Angel threatens to reveal Wolfram & Hart's criminality when he discovers they're stealing from a teen shelter.
35	13	"Happy Anniversary"	Bill L. Norton	Story by : Joss Whedon & David Greenwalt; Teleplay by : David Greenwalt	February 6, 2001	2ADH13	4.33
Angel and Lorne search for a physicist who plans to freeze time, while Wesley, Cordelia and Gunn establish themselves as independent detectives.
36	14	"The Thin Dead Line"	Scott McGinnis	Jim Kouf & Shawn Ryan	February 13, 2001	2ADH14	4.51
Angel teams up with Kate to investigate the rumors of zombie policemen who are out for blood while Cordelia, Wesley, and Gunn fend for themselves.
37	15	"Reprise"	James Whitmore, Jr.	Tim Minear	February 20, 2001	2ADH15	4.45
One of Wolfram and Hart's "senior partners" is coming to visit, and Angel is determined to take it out.
38	16	"Epiphany"	Thomas J. Wright	Tim Minear	February 27, 2001	2ADH16	5.21
After an empty night of passion with Darla, Angel wakes up with his soul still intact and has an epiphany.
39	17	"Disharmony"	Fred Keller	David Fury	April 17, 2001	2ADH17	3.64
While the group tries to track down vampires, Cordelia gets a surprise visit from her high school friend Harmony.
40	18	"Dead End"	James A. Contner	David Greenwalt	April 24, 2001	2ADH18	4.40
Cordelia's visions get worse and the gang fears for her health. Meanwhile, Lindsey is granted a new hand.
41	19	"Belonging"	Turi Meyer	Shawn Ryan	May 1, 2001	2ADH19	4.56
Angel and his crew must find a way to kill a bloodthirsty demon who has arrived in town from another dimension.
42	20	"Over the Rainbow"	Fred Keller	Mere Smith	May 8, 2001	2ADH20	5.03
Cordelia is sucked through a magic portal and transported to a demon dimension where humans are considered inferior, prompting the gang to rescue her.
43	21	"Through the Looking Glass"	Tim Minear	Tim Minear	May 15, 2001	2ADH21	5.18
After learning that Cordelia has become the Princess of Pylea, Wesley and Gunn are captured by rebels as Angel tries to save a slave sentenced to execution.
44	22	"There's No Place Like Plrtz Glrb"	David Greenwalt	David Greenwalt	May 22, 2001	2ADH22	4.84
Aided by Fred, Angel struggles with his inner beast the demon dimension brings out in him, while Wesley and Gunn join with rebel forces to overthrow the government. In the last scene, the team return home to the Hyperion to find Willow with news of Buffy's death in "The Gift".

== Reception ==
The second season won the International Horror Guild Award for Best Television. It was nominated for five Saturn Awards – Best Network Television Series, Best Actor on Television (David Boreanaz), Best Actress on Television (Charisma Carpenter), Best Supporting Actor on Television (Alexis Denisof) and Best Supporting Actress on Television (Juliet Landau).

The Futon Critic named "Reunion" the 20th best episode of 2000. Slayage cited the episode "Are You Now or Have You Ever Been" as the greatest episode of the series.

The second season averaged 4.1 million viewers, slightly lower than the fifth season of Buffy.

== DVD release ==
Angel: The Complete Second Season was released on DVD in region 1 on September 2, 2003 and in region 2 on April 15, 2002. The DVD includes all 22 episodes on 6 discs presented in anamorphic widescreen 1.78:1 aspect ratio. Special features on the DVD include two commentary tracks—"Are You Now or Have You Ever Been" by writer Tim Minear and "Over the Rainbow" by director Fred Keller. Scripts for "Darla" and "Disharmony" are included. Featurettes include, "Making up the Monsters", which details the make-up design; "Inside the Agency" is a set tour of various sets; "Stunts" details the choreography of the stunts; and "Season 2 Overview" is a summary of the season featuring interviews with cast and crew members. A photo stills gallery is also included.
