= Lorne (Angel) =

Character in the television series Angel

- Angel character
- First appearance: "Judgment" (2000)
- Last appearance: Angel: After the Fall
- Created by: Joss Whedon
- Portrayed by: Andy Hallett

In-universe information
- Affiliation: Caritas bar Angel Investigations; Wolfram & Hart
- Classification: Deathwok clan demon
- Notable powers: Aura-reading, telepathy, empathy, lie detection, and precognition Superhuman hearing, longevity, and sonic scream

Krevlornswath of the Deathwok Clan, more commonly called "Lorne" or "The Host," is a fictional character created by David Greenwalt and Joss Whedon for the television series Angel. The character was portrayed by Andy Hallett.

== Biography ==
=== Character history ===
Lorne was born as Krevlornswath of the Deathwok Clan in the demonic dimension of Pylea. Lorne, as he prefers to be called, was not like his fellow Deathwok clan demons, who were bloodthirsty "champions" constantly undertaking quests against evil. He is a gentle soul who does not share his kin's prejudice against humans (or "cows" as they are called in his world). Lorne would rather flirt with the female demons and enjoy life than train to be a fighter. He also enjoyed beauty, art, and even music, which was difficult, considering his world had no music. Lorne refused to train his innate mystical senses to learn to hunt beasts and is considered the shame of his clan.

In 1996, Lorne happened upon a dimensional portal and was sucked through it (his future friend Winifred Burkle was sucked into Pylea through that same portal). He landed in Los Angeles and discovered music and culture like he never imagined. Lorne learned to hone his mystical senses to read people's auras, but he found it easiest to do so when they sang, baring their souls. He opened up a karaoke bar on the same spot that he arrived on Earth, an old abandoned building. Lorne contracted the Transuding Furies to cast a sanctuary spell on the spot, which stopped any demon violence from occurring on it. He named the bar "Caritas," the Latin word for "charity," and allowed anyone, good or evil, to become a patron. At some point he befriended psychic Agnes "Aggie" Belfleur, whom he later visits in the episode "Over the Rainbow."

Caritas became a success in the morally ambiguous Los Angeles underground scene. To most who visit the bar, Lorne is simply called "The Host." He later states he did not use the name "Lorne" in this dimension because his striking green skin prompted people to make Lorne Greene jokes.

Lorne is reluctant at times to help Angel and the other heroes of the series, preferring to maintain a neutral stance and simply provide a peaceful place for all demons, but his essential goodness usually wins out over his reticence. He starts off by giving the characters advice and encouragement, but as time goes on, he becomes more directly involved in the cases of Angel Investigations—even asking for Angel's help to avert the end of the world when Angel had severed ties with the rest of the group after Darla's resurrection—and his many contacts in Los Angeles' magical underworld prove useful. Angel even admits severing ties with them was to keep them from a path they couldn't handle, having no desire to do anything worse than fire them, such as forcing them to participate in punishing the guilty and getting them killed by Wolfram & Hart, Darla, Drusilla, or in general. Angel wanted them to hate him forever, especially for the horrible things he was doing to prevent the end of the world. Lorne did not find a way to reveal all this to them, which Angel didn't want them to know, feeling they were better off that way instead of dead or forced to do terrible things against their will.

Lorne reluctantly joins the team in their mission to Pylea to rescue Cordelia, discovering that he could incapacitate the natives by singing songs and causing them to cower from the "strange sorcery". On leaving, he decides returning to Pylea had been good for him as it had reaffirmed he did not belong there and was right to stay away.

In Season Three of Angel, Caritas is raided by Charles Gunn's old gang (as the magical barrier prevents only demonic violence, not human violence) and it is temporarily put out of action, finally being completely destroyed by Daniel Holtz. After that, Lorne moves to the Hyperion Hotel and finds himself becoming far more attached to the AI team, and he often looks after the infant Connor while Angel is on business. While there, he also discovers that Gavin Park had the Hyperion Hotel bugged, and A.I. manages to destroy them. Eventually, he leaves to start a singing career in Las Vegas, Nevada. Unfortunately, a crime lord forces him, under threat of killing innocents, to use his empathic abilities to locate audience members with promising futures so he can steal them. Back in L.A. after being rescued by Angel, Gunn and Fred, Lorne helps restore Cordelia's lost memories and is part of the fight against the resulting Jasmine crisis.

In the show's fifth and final season, Lorne finds himself the new head of Wolfram & Hart's Entertainment Division, at first fitting into the job with relative ease and making various business deals in the film industry. As time goes on, his kindness is slowly replaced by a growing cynicism and self-loathing of his position of "cheerleader" for Angel and his friends, particularly when Gunn is abandoned in a Hell dimension to recover Lindsey McDonald because Lindsey could possess information they needed; Lorne had always assumed they didn't leave anyone behind.

When his close friend Fred is murdered and her body usurped by the Old One known as Illyria, Lorne becomes filled with despair which he keeps secret from the rest of his equally heartbroken friends. By the conclusion of the series, he announces he is leaving Los Angeles after carrying out his part in Angel's plan to destroy the Circle of the Black Thorn. When Lorne learns what his part is to be, he tells Angel "I'll do this last thing for you, for us... but then I'm out, and you won't find me in the alley afterwards. Hell, you won't find me at all. Do me a favor. Don't try." Lorne's part is to betray and murder longtime enemy-turned-ally Lindsey, who in his final words mutters at the unfairness of being killed by Lorne, a "flunky", and not his longtime rival Angel.

In his final scene, after shooting Lindsey with a silenced pistol, a disgusted and broken Lorne walks off into the darkness. He drops the gun and simply says, "Goodnight, folks" as he leaves.

=== Literature ===
In the canonical comic book continuation Angel: After the Fall, Lorne is wandering the streets of L.A. when the entire town is sent into hell. He simply flees in a demonic taxicab instead of assisting against the resulting demonic invasion. However, the cab is destroyed and Lorne finds himself watching civilians in Silver Lake fighting back. He assists them with his vocal powers. Though they are soon joined by a sorceress, many Silver Lake residents die before a permanent demon-free area is established. The people elect Lorne as their leader. Lorne tries to remain neutral as Angel battles the various Demon Lords that have overtaken the rest of Los Angeles. However, he soon changes his mind and throws in fully with his old friends. The Demon Lords are slain and Lorne becomes the chosen ruler of all of L.A. Later, Lorne and the entire town are sent back to Earth, all slain are now alive again. Only memories of Hell remain. As with his friends, Lorne is now famous for his good deeds.

Angel #18 onwards continues the narrative of After the Fall. In '"Angel: Aftermath", it is mentioned in passing by Angel to Connor that Lorne is "putting his life back together", and is briefly seen entering the door of a business. In March 2010 IDW released the special one-shot "Angel: Lorne - Music of the Spheres", written and drawn by John Byrne as a tribute to the late Andy Hallett. In this story it transpires that Lorne has developed cancer, possibly due to doing something 'that was completely and utterly against (his) nature' (i.e. killing Lindsey). As the tale progresses three demons, Discord, Disharmony and Cacophony, attempt to destroy all the multiverses by affecting the "Music of the Spheres". Angel, Illyria, the Groosalugg and Lorne intercept them just as they release three notes which will destroy the universe, causing the center to unbalance. Lorne realises that he has to "become the new center", and he jumps into the abyss, closing the portal. At the end of the story, Angel realises that he's "at one with the universe now. But...I'd like to think that he can still hear us. And that he knows how much he's missed." Lorne has been narrating the story all along and replies, "Oh, I can hear you Angelcakes, and it's music to my ears."

== Powers and abilities ==
Lorne can read people's auras, and their futures, whilst they are singing. For some time he would use this to give the singers emotional advice. Lorne can also read their thoughts and emotions when he does this, although he has shown an ability to read basic details about auras even without singing, and can gain considerable knowledge of others when they are in emotional distress. Like other members of his clan, Lorne is immune to the intoxicating effects of normal alcohol, but can get drunk by ingesting certain magical brews.

He can hear outside the normal human range; at one point he tunes into transmission frequencies. He can also generate tones painful to human hearing. He can adjust it to different effects, from damaging lightbulbs to destroying demons. Unique to his clan is the ability to survive the complete removal of his limbs and even beheading, unless his body is mutilated after the dismemberment.

In the episode "Life of the Party", Lorne's lack of sleep causes his subconscious to use his powers differently. Instead of reading destinies, he starts to write them, granting him a sort of mind control/suggestion power. By making sarcastic comments to the rest of the team, he inadvertently transforms Spike's cynic personality into optimistic and super-positive, makes Wesley and Fred act extremely drunk despite very little alcohol, causes Gunn to urinate all over the Wolfram & Hart building (he had told Gunn to "stake out his territory", resulting in literally marking his territory in a manner similar to animals), and influences Angel to have sex with Eve after sarcastically commenting on the sexual tension between the two. His subconscious, unable to cope with the conflicts Lorne usually handled in his sleep, then manifests as an astral projection which possesses superhuman strength and durability. This enlarged version then attacks several demons that had recently angered Lorne. These powers were lost when Lorne's ability to sleep returns to him.

== Character development ==
Andy Hallett worked in Los Angeles as the personal assistant to Kai Cole, the wife of Buffy the Vampire Slayer creator Joss Whedon. When the couple and their friends saw Hallett singing at the "B.B. Kings" lounge at Universal CityWalk, Whedon conceived of Lorne as an anagogic demon who reads the hearts and futures of his guests as they sing in his karaoke bar. Hallett was invited to try out for the part, and won it after three auditions.

The character of Lorne was featured as a recurring character in 45 episodes before Hallett was added to the title sequence as a series regular for the last nine episodes of the fourth season, and all of the fifth; in total he appeared as Lorne in 76 of the show's 110 episodes. The character's demonic visage involved extensive prosthetic makeup and detailed coloring of his face, neck and hands, leading to early calls for at least two and a half hours of makeup before Hallett's filming day could begin.

== Appearances ==
=== Canonical appearances ===
Lorne had 86 canonical Buffyverse appearances.

Angel: Andy Hallett was promoted to series regular starting with the Season 4 episode, "Release", appearing as Lorne in every episode onward. Andy Hallett guest starred as the character in 46 episodes.

- Season 2 (2000–2001): "Judgment", "First Impressions", "Dear Boy", "Guise Will Be Guise", "The Trial", "Redefinition", "Happy Anniversary", "Reprise", "Epiphany, Disharmony", "Dead End", "Belonging", "Over the Rainbow", "Through the Looking Glass", "There's No Place Like Plrtz Glrb"
- Season 3 (2001–2002): "Heartthrob", "That Vision Thing", "That Old Gang of Mine", "Fredless", "Offspring", "Lullaby", "Dad", "Birthday", "Provider", "Waiting in the Wings", "Couplet", "Sleep Tight", "Forgiving", "Double or Nothing", "The Price", "A New World", "Benediction", "Tomorrow"
- Season 4 (2002–2003): "Deep Down", "The House Always Wins", "Slouching Toward Bethlehem", "Supersymmetry", "Spin the Bottle", "Apocalypse, Nowish", "Habeas Corpses", "Long Day's Journey", "Awakening", "Soulless", "Calvary", "Salvage"

Lorne appeared in 10 canonical issues.

- Spike: Asylum (2006–07): "Asylum, Parts 3-5"
- Angel: After the Fall (2008–09): "After the Fall, Parts 4-6, 9, 10, 15, 17"

=== Non-canonical appearances ===
Lorne has appeared in several non-canonical extensions of the Buffyverse, being prominently featured in: Monster Island, Dark Mirror, Love and Death, & Spike: Shadow Puppets.
