= Reunion (Angel) =

- Angel episode
- Episode no.: Season 2 Episode 10
- Directed by: James A. Contner
- Written by: Tim Minear; Shawn Ryan
- Production code: 2ADH10
- Original air date: December 19, 2000

Guest appearances
- Elisabeth Röhm as Kate Lockley; Christian Kane as Lindsey McDonald; Stephanie Romanov as Lilah Morgan; Sam Anderson as Holland Manners; Julie Benz as Darla; Juliet Landau as Drusilla; Stephanie Manglaras as Landlord; Karen Tucker as Female Shopper; Erik Liberman as Erik; Katherine Ann McGregor as Catherine; Michael Rotondi as Burly Guy

Episode chronology
← Previous "The Trial"	Next → "Redefinition"
- Angel season 2

"Reunion" is the 10th episode of the second season of the American television series Angel.

== Plot ==
Angel tells his associates that Drusilla has returned and, working with Wolfram & Hart, has made Darla a vampire again. Wesley and Cordelia investigate the law firm's plans for Drusilla and Darla as Angel prepares to stake the two vampires. In an attempt to find Drusilla and Darla, Angel goes to Lindsey’s apartment, who has been sheltering Drusilla, however he has already moved. The property manager stops by and remarks that Lindsey's cousin - a "sweet, but very odd English girl" - is visiting him and is expecting a daughter, whom she wanted to be born near the stars. Gunn realizes that Drusilla has taken Darla, who is dead until she wakes as a newly made vampire, to a plant nursery. Angel locates Darla, who is wrapped in a shroud and shallowly buried in a raised box of dirt. He attempts to stake the unconscious Darla, but Drusilla attacks him. Darla revives as Angel and Drusilla struggle; she escapes and Drusilla disappears.

At Wolfram & Hart, Holland and Lindsey are discussing the evening's planned party when Drusilla arrives to update them on recent events. Darla appears and drags Drusilla off. As Angel races to the W&H offices, Cordelia has a vision which sends them elsewhere. Darla confronts Drusilla for making her a vampire; Drusilla admits she is feeling very lonely and she wanted to save Darla. After bloodsucking and killing a fresh victim, Darla has her old confidence restored and takes Drusilla shopping.

While driving to find Drusilla and Darla, Cordelia has a vision which detours their mission. Angel brusquely completes the mission from Cordelia's vision, then heads back toward Wolfram & Hart. Holland unleashes Darla and Drusilla on Los Angeles; they begin by raiding a clothing store for new wardrobes, killing two salespeople. Angel forces his way into Wolfram & Hart, demanding information. Lindsey refuses; Angel is arrested and taken into custody by Kate. She releases him, hoping he can stop Darla and Drusilla's killing spree.

Holland hosts a wine tasting party for his colleagues in his home's wine cellar. As he makes a speech, Darla and Drusilla appear, intent on slaughter. Holland attempts to convince the two that he and his associates are their allies, to little effect. Angel finds a survivor at the clothing store and learns where Darla and Drusilla have gone. When he arrives at Holland's home, however, he refuses to stop Darla and Drusilla, instead locking the wine cellar to prevent the lawyers from escaping the vampires.

When Angel tells his associates what he has done, they object, fearing that Angel is descending into corruption and darkness. He fires them and leaves.

== Reception ==
The Futon Critic named it the 20th best episode of 2000, saying the episode had several jaw-dropping moments and that he "never wanted to see the next episode of a series more than this one."
