= Are You Now or Have You Ever Been =

- Angel episode
- Episode no.: Season 2 Episode 2
- Directed by: David Semel
- Written by: Tim Minear
- Production code: 2ADH02
- Original air date: October 3, 2000

Guest appearances
- Melissa Marsala as Judy Kovacs; Tony Amendola as Thesulac Demon; John Kapelos as Ronald Meeks; Tommy Hinkley as The Private Investigator; Brett Rickaby as Bookstore Owner; Scott Thompson Baker as Actor; J. P. Manoux as Frank Gilnitz; David Kagen as Salesman; Terrence Beasor as Older Man; Julie Araskog as Over the Hill Whore; Tom Beyer as Blacklisted Writer; Eve Sigall as Old Judy

Episode chronology
← Previous "Judgment"	Next → "First Impressions"
- Angel season 2

"Are You Now or Have You Ever Been" is the second episode of the second season of the American television series Angel. Written by Tim Minear and directed by David Semel, it was originally broadcast on October 3, 2000, on the WB network. In the episode, Angel (David Boreanaz) recalls a traumatic experience during the 1950s at the Hyperion Hotel.

The episode is a fan favorite and was also a personal favorite of actor David Boreanaz. Writer Tim Minear said it was personally enjoyable for him to write the episode, even though he normally preferred writing longer story arcs that gradually unfolded over the course of an entire season.

== Plot ==
Angel asks Wesley and Cordelia to look into the mysterious history of the abandoned Hyperion Hotel. A photograph of the hotel blends into an action shot of the hotel exterior during the 1950s, as the manager sends the bellhop upstairs to give the guest in 217 his weekly bill. The bellhop nervously makes his delivery, then runs downstairs, as Angel- the feared occupant of 217 -opens the door. As the House Un-American Activities Committee hearings blare on a TV, Angel strolls through the lobby and the manager turns away an African-American family, telling them that (despite what their sign says) the hotel has no vacancies. On the second floor, heading towards his room, he observes a man banging on a door. In the background, two men share a furtive romantic moment outside a room door. Back in his room, Angel finds a woman pretending to be a maid. When Angel calls her bluff, she tells him that she's hiding from her boyfriend, the man earlier seen banging on a door. Angel helps her hide from him, smashing the door in his face when the man pulls a gun.

In the present, Angel visits the now-abandoned Hyperion. While doing research with Wesley, Cordelia discovers that the property is a historical landmark, but that it has been plagued by strange events since it was built. Cordelia then spots Angel in a 1952 photograph of the hotel lobby, and Wesley realizes that Angel has a personal connection to the Hyperion.

In 1952, the salesman in the room next to Angel's listens to a record, talks to someone unseen, then holds a gun to his head. Angel hears a gunshot and the record skipping, and drinks his glass of chilled blood without reacting. When the manager and bellhop discover the salesman's suicide, the manager hears a demonic voice whispering, "They'll shut you down," and instructs the bellhop not to call the police. They then hide the body in a meat locker. That night, the guests gather at Griffith Observatory, where they discuss the suicide and wonder why the police haven't been notified. Judy tries to thank Angel, but he is unreceptive. The next day, the guests continue to discuss the salesman, questioning if he might have been murdered. Upstairs, when Angel comments on Judy's agitation, she confesses the man banging on the door was a PI sent by the bank from which she stole money. She was fired from the bank when they found out that, although she "passes" as white, she is actually part African American. Her fiancé also left her when he found out. Angry at the bank, she stole the money, but has not spent any of it, and Judy regrets her decision to steal. Angel replies that "fear makes people do stupid things," then clarifies he was referring to her employers. As Angel stashes Judy's bag of money in the basement, he hears whispering and realizes something in the hotel is making people paranoid.

In the present, Cordelia and Wesley find newspaper reports of the bellhop's execution for the salesman's murder, and an article about Judy with the headline, "Search Called Off — Fugitive Woman Believed Dead." Down in the basement, Angel finds the bag of money and once again hears the whispering. He contacts the others, announcing the hotel hosts a Thesulac demon that whispers to its victims, then feeds on their insecurities. He says he already knows the ritual to make it corporeal so that it can be killed.

In 1952, Angel returns from a bookstore where he has learned the ritual to corporealize the demon; meanwhile, the PI reveals Judy's secret. When the guests turn on her, she points them towards Angel, announcing that he has blood in his room. Everyone attacks Angel, except Judy, who starts to cry. Angel is dragged into the hallway; a noose is tied to a rafter and he is pushed over the railing to hang. The crowd cheers, then slowly wonders what they've done. When everyone leaves, Angel frees himself and drops to the lobby floor. On the stairs, the Thesulac demon becomes corporeal, gloating about the paranoia he just fed on; Judy's despair is particularly delicious as she had just come to start to have faith in humanity again due to Angel's friendship and help. Her pain at what she has done to Angel has made her "a meal that will last a lifetime". The demon says, "There's an entire hotel here just full of tortured souls that could use your help." Angel replies, "Take them all.", abandoning Judy and the rest of the residents to their fate.

In the present, Cordelia, Wesley, and Gunn arrive at the Hyperion and, after performing the spell to make the Thesulac corporeal, Angel electrocutes it with the exposed wires of the fuse box. Angel heads upstairs and finds Judy, now old, still in her room, where she has served as the Demon's "room service" since 1952. She says the voices are gone, and asks Angel if it is safe to go out. He tells her it is, but she is so tired that she needs to rest first. She then tells Angel that she is sorry she got him killed and asks his forgiveness. He assures her she did not kill him and tells her that he forgives her. She then passes away. Angel returns downstairs and announces that they're moving in. Wesley reminds Angel that evil things have happened in the hotel, but Angel tells him that all of that is in the past.

== Production ==
=== Writing ===
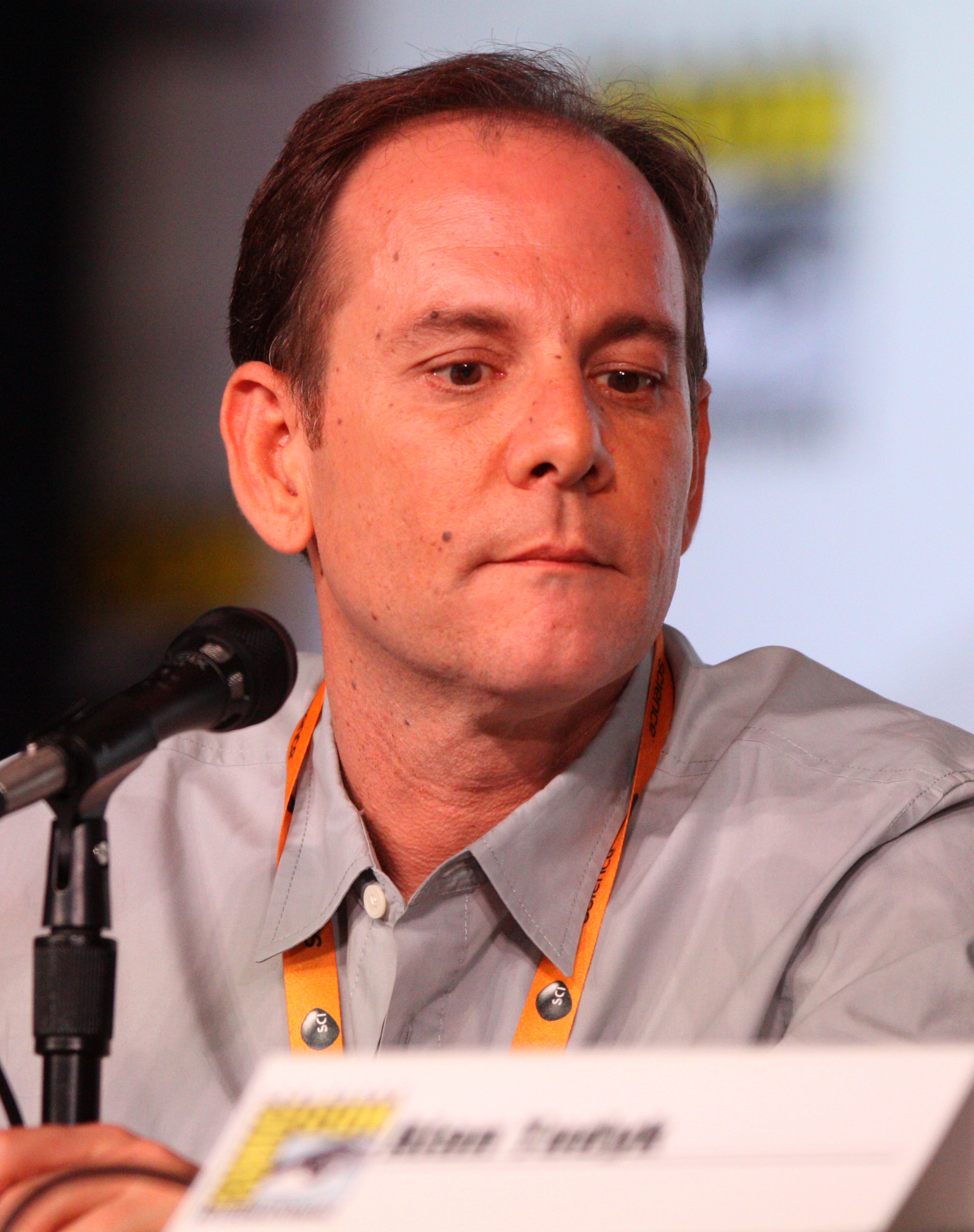
Tim Minear wrote the episode: "Are You Now or Have You Ever Been".

This is another episode by writer Tim Minear that explores Angel's background. "He's cynical, I-don't-get-involved guy, and I thought that was a very interesting place to be," says Minear. "Although he does reach out to help someone in the episode, it doesn't take much to push him out of that light." When fans point out the flashback scene in Buffy in which Angel is living on the streets of New York City, Minear deflects the accusation of retconning by saying, "I don't believe he was thrown out of that room in Romania by Darla in 1898 and has been on the street ever since...in the 1950s, that was the beginning of his descent into the streets."

The theme of otherness is carried through this episode by exploring LA's history of social exclusion. The hysteria provoked by the paranoia demon mirrors the fears of communism surrounding LA's entertainment community, the fear of being revealed as gay by a well-known actor who arranges furtive liaisons at the hotel, the racism that caused an African American family to be turned away from the hotel, the racism that led to Judy's firing and rejection by family, friends, and fiancé, and the lynch mob that attacked Angel. This both captures the connection between anti-communism and racist policing, and serves as direct comment on the perpetuation of past prejudices and relevance to recent events.

=== Set design ===
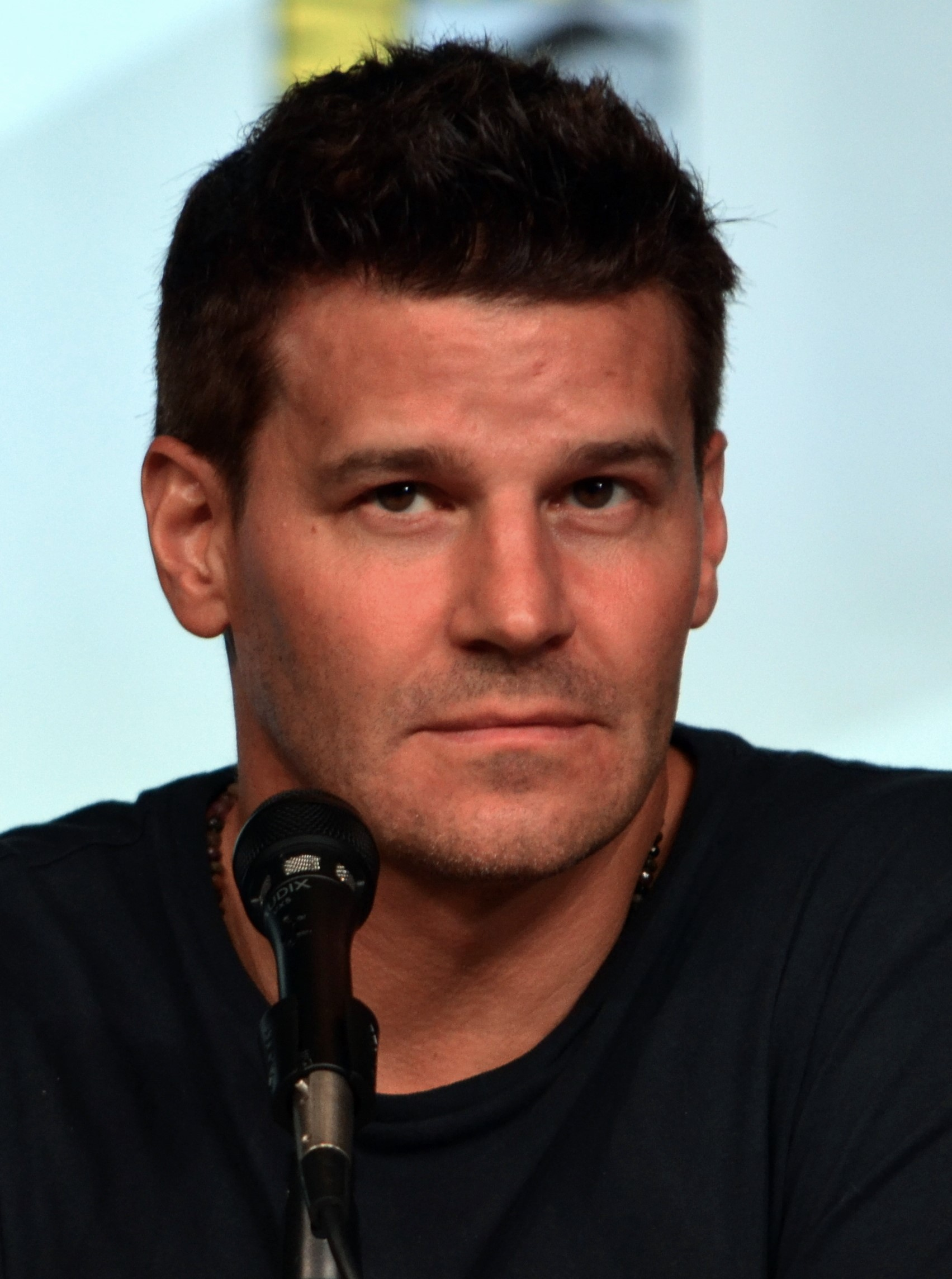
Actor David Boreanaz cited the episode as one of his personal favorites.

This episode introduces the Hyperion Hotel, which becomes Angel's main set until season 5. Production designer Stuart Blatt explains that after blowing up Angel's cramped office in the season one finale, he had the opportunity to create a bigger, more "film-friendly" set that the crew and cameras could move through freely. Creator Joss Whedon suggested an abandoned hotel, something similar to the hotel in the Coen Brothers' Barton Fink. The exterior shots of the Hyperion are of a historic building on Wilshire Boulevard in Los Angeles called the Los Altos Hotel & Apartments, which Blatt had previously used in the episode "I Fall to Pieces". The Los Altos was home to many Hollywood celebrities — including Bette Davis, Mae West, and William Randolph Hearst — before the Great Depression, similar to the fictional history of the Hyperion featured in this episode. Blatt says the front doors of the Hyperion are "exact duplicates" of those at the Los Altos, and the back garden closely resembles the back garden in the apartments, which allows the crew to film the characters entering and exiting the building on location. "Then we cut to the interior of the hotel," Blatt says, which is on a sound stage, "and it all works fairly seamlessly."

== Reception ==
This episode is a fan favorite, regularly ranking as one of the top episodes of the series. Slayage calls this episode one of Angel's best: "a character study, offering insight into Angel's past."

Noel Murray, writing for The A.V. Club, thought director David Semel "evokes classic retro-L.A. movies like Chinatown and Barton Fink and L.A. Confidential, but also Alfred Hitchcock and Douglas Sirk and Nicholas Ray. It works as an offbeat one-off, but also expands the Angel mythology, by reminding the audience how long the show's hero has been around, and then giving him a new home at the end of the episode when he decides to move Angel Investigations' offices to the Hyperion."

Writer Tim Minear says that, although he generally prefers the season-long story arcs to the movie-of-the-week, this episode "rang his inner gong." He explains that writing this episode was a way for him "to indulge in a delicious just-for-me treat." David Boreanaz has also cited it as one of his favorite episodes.
