= Mere Smith =

American television script-writer

- Occupation(s): Television producer, television writer
- Years active: 1999–present

Meredyth (Mere) Smith is an American television script-writer who has been described as a key writer of the series Angel. She was also the executive story editor and script coordinator for 66 episodes from 1999 to 2003.

While living in Brooklyn, Smith was active on The Bronze, the Buffy the Vampire Slayer message board, and wrote Buffy fan fiction, before attending a Bronze meet-up in Los Angeles in 1998. Through a connection there, she obtained a position as assistant to a co-executive producer on the series Strange World. She then became a script coordinator and later a writer of the Buffy spin-off series Angel.

Among the episodes of Angel that Smith wrote, "Orpheus" was described by director Terrence O'Hara as "the most challenging episode", and by producer Jeffrey Bell as "maybe […] her best episode, just really dense and complicated and really interesting.”

She also wrote the episodes "Heroes of the Republic" and "Deus Impeditio Esuritori Nullus" for the HBO series Rome (2007), as well as episodes of Tarzan (2003), Burn Notice (2007), Jonny Zero, and The Nine Lives of Chloe King (2011).

Smith attended Estero High School, Florida, and in 1993 won a National Merit Scholarship to study acting at Brown University, where she contributed often to its theatre productions. She is originally from Houston, Texas.

== Angel episodes ==
- 2.04 "Untouched"
- 2.11 "Redefinition"
- 2.12 "Blood Money"
- 2.20 "Over the Rainbow"
- 3.05 "Fredless"
- 3.11 "Birthday"
- 3.15 "Loyalty"
- 4.02 "Ground State"
- 4.09 "Long Day's Journey"
- 4.12 "Calvary"
- 4.15 "Orpheus"
