= Andy Hallett =

American actor and singer (1975–2009)

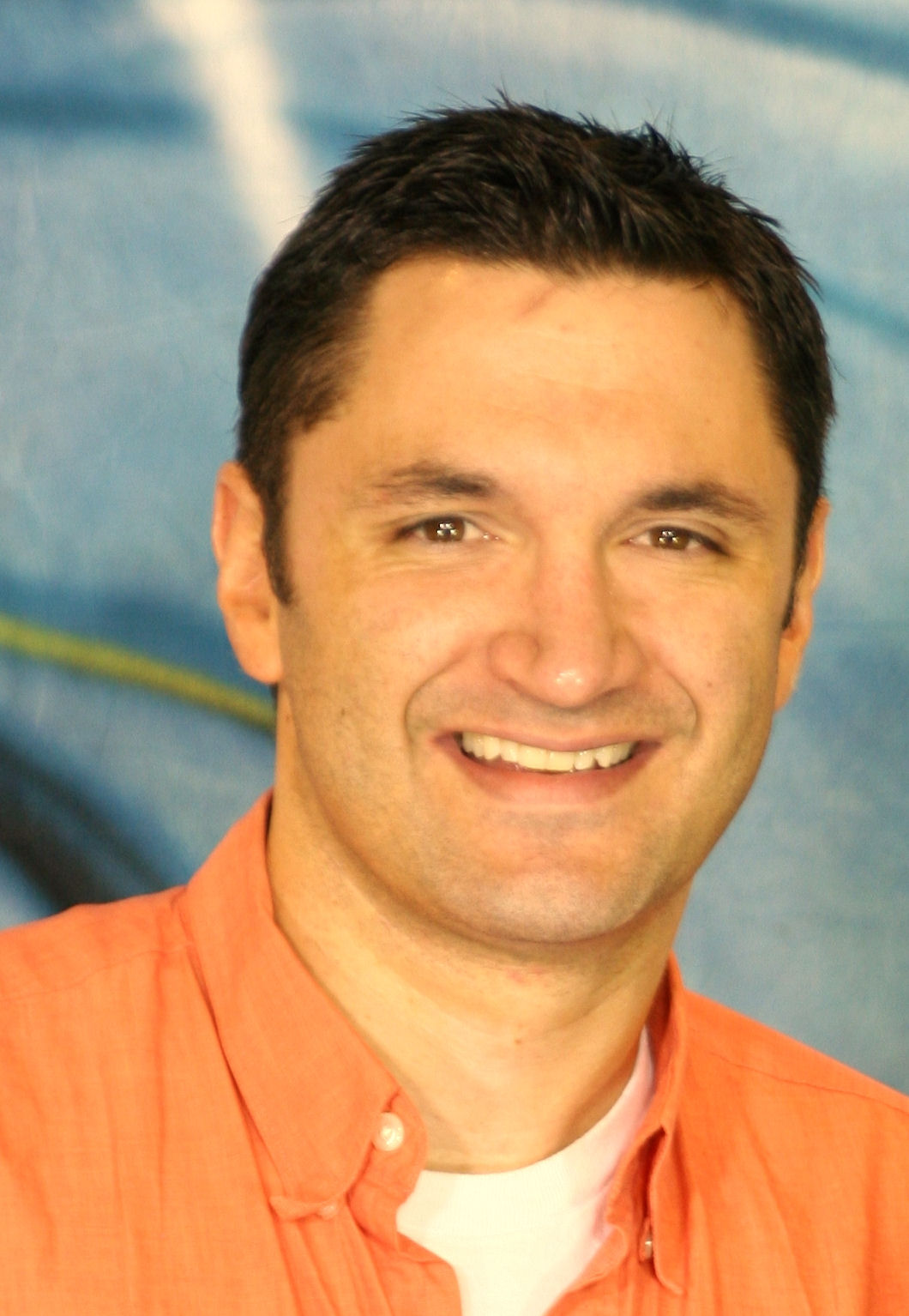
- Hallett in 2006

Background information
- Born: Andrew Alcott Hallett; August 4, 1975; Cape Cod, Massachusetts, U.S.
- Origin: Osterville, Massachusetts, U.S.
- Died: March 29, 2009 (aged 33) Los Angeles, California, U.S.
- Occupations: Actor, singer
- Years active: 1999–2009
- Label: Rounder Records

Andrew Alcott Hallett (August 4, 1975 – March 29, 2009) was an American actor and singer who became best known for playing the part of Lorne in the television series Angel (2000–2004). He used his singing talents often on the show, and performed two songs on the series' 2005 soundtrack album, Angel: Live Fast, Die Never.

== Early life ==
Hallett was an only child, and hailed from the Cape Cod village of Osterville, Massachusetts, which is part of the town of Barnstable. He was a 1993 graduate from Barnstable High School and he went on to Assumption College in Worcester after graduation.

He did not begin singing publicly until he was invited onstage at a concert, and discovered the thrill of performing. He was in the audience at a Patti LaBelle concert, in Boston, when she coaxed a group of guys onto the stage; "I'm this little white boy. I started singing, and we blew the house down. I sang a line and she said, 'This is a white boy with soul.'"

== Career ==
After moving to Los Angeles, Hallett worked as a runner for an agency and then as a property manager. He eventually became a personal assistant to Kai Cole, wife of Buffy the Vampire Slayer creator Joss Whedon. When the couple and their friends saw Hallett singing at the "B.B. Kings" lounge at Universal CityWalk, Whedon conceived a new character for his new show Angel: Lorne, an anagogic demon who reads the hearts and futures of his guests as they sing in his karaoke bar. Hallett was invited to try out for the part, and won it after three auditions. Angel was his first real job as an actor, though he did play an extra role in a 1999 episode of Buffy; he acquired agent Pat Brady only after she spotted him singing and acting in "Judgment", the premiere episode of Angel's second season.

The character of Lorne was featured as a recurring character in 45 episodes before Hallett was added to the title sequence as a series regular for the last nine episodes of the fourth season, and all of the fifth; in total he appeared as Lorne in 76 of the show's 110 episodes. The character's demonic visage involved extensive prosthetic makeup and detailed coloring of his face, neck and hands, leading to early calls for at least two and a half hours of makeup before Hallett's filming day could begin.

During the run of Angel, Hallett appeared in two other small productions: The Enforcers (2001), a TV miniseries directed by Angel writer Mere Smith, and Chance (2002), a film directed by Buffy actress Amber Benson.

== Health complications and death ==
According to a 2005 interview, about a month after filming the last episode of Angel, Hallett suffered a dental infection which spread through the bloodstream to his heart, leading to a case of cardiomyopathy, for which he spent five days in the hospital. Although he recovered, his heart muscle and valves were weakened and he found himself easily fatigued afterward. He did not return to acting (except for a voice part in the animated film Geppetto's Secret), but pursued his music career and frequently appeared at media conventions for Buffy and Angel and for science fiction and fantasy in general.

Five years after first experiencing heart problems, and after at least three additional hospitalizations, Hallett died from congestive heart failure on March 29, 2009, at Cedars-Sinai Hospital in Los Angeles with his father by his bedside. He was 33 years old.

== Legacy ==
The character of Lorne continued on in the comic book series Angel: After the Fall, and a 48-page book Lorne: The Music of the Spheres about the character was written by John Byrne, published in 2010. Chris Ryall of IDW Publishing said, "the issue serves as a tribute to Andy as well as a final send-off for Lorne, too."

== Filmography ==
Year	Title	Role	Notes
1999	Buffy the Vampire Slayer	Student (uncredited)	Episode: "Hush"
2000–2004	Angel	Lorne/The Host	76 episodes Nominated—Satellite Award for Best Supporting Actor - Series, Miniseries or Television Film
2001	The Enforcers	Wallace	
2002	Chance	Jack	
2005	Geppetto's Secret	Cricket	voice
