= Angel (1999 TV series) =

American television series (1999–2004)

- Genre: Supernatural fiction; Drama; Action; Horror; Neo-noir; Tragedy
- Created by: Joss Whedon; David Greenwalt
- Showrunners: Joss Whedon; David Greenwalt
- Starring: David Boreanaz; Charisma Carpenter; Glenn Quinn; Alexis Denisof; J. August Richards; Amy Acker; Vincent Kartheiser; Andy Hallett; James Marsters; Mercedes McNab
- Theme music composer: Darling Violetta
- Composers: Christophe Beck; Robert J. Kral
- Country of origin: United States
- Original language: English
- No. of seasons: 5
- No. of episodes: 110 (list of episodes)

Production
- Executive producers: Joss Whedon; David Greenwalt; Tim Minear; Jeffrey Bell; David Fury; Fran Rubel Kuzui; Kaz Kuzui
- Running time: 41–45 minutes
- Production companies: Mutant Enemy; Greenwolf Corp (season 1); David Greenwalt Productions (seasons 2–3); Kuzui Enterprises; Sandollar Television; 20th Century Fox Television

Original release
- Network: The WB
- Release: October 5, 1999 – May 19, 2004

Related
- Buffy the Vampire Slayer

Angel is an American supernatural drama television series, a spinoff of Buffy the Vampire Slayer. The series was created by Buffy's creator, writer and director Joss Whedon, in collaboration with David Greenwalt. It aired on The WB from October 5, 1999, to May 19, 2004, consisting of five seasons and 110 episodes. Like Buffy, it was produced by Whedon's production company, Mutant Enemy.

The show details the ongoing trials of Angel, a vampire whose human soul was restored to him by a Romani curse as a punishment for the murder of one of their own. After more than a century of murder and the torture of innocents, Angel's restored soul torments him with guilt and remorse. Angel moves to Los Angeles, California, after it is clear that his doomed relationship with Buffy, the vampire slayer, cannot continue. For the majority of the show, he works as a private detective in Los Angeles, where he and a variety of associates work to "help the helpless", restoring the faith and saving the souls of those who have lost their way. While regularly struggling with his own vampiric nature, he simultaneously battles against demons and humans aligned with them throughout the story. Angel's archnemesis for most of the series is Wolfram & Hart, a preeminent yet malevolent global law firm that is secretly a front for powerful demonic forces.

The show is considered by many critics as one of the best TV spin-off series of all time, with praise for its darker tone, characters and performances.

== Characters ==
The principal Angel actors portraying their characters (Season 3), from left to right: Gunn, Cordelia, Angel, Wesley and Fred

The series focuses on Angel (David Boreanaz), an Irish vampire who is over 240 years old. Angel was known as Angelus during his rampages across Europe, but was cursed with a soul, which gave him a conscience and guilt for centuries of murder and torture. He left Buffy the Vampire Slayer at the end of season 3 to move to Los Angeles in search of redemption.

He soon finds himself assisted by Allen Francis Doyle (Glenn Quinn), another Irish character who is a half-human, half-demon who, although he comes across as a ne'er-do-well hustler, has a heroic side. Doyle serves to pass along cryptic visions from The Powers That Be to Angel. They are soon joined by Cordelia Chase (Charisma Carpenter), also a previous cast member of Buffy. Formerly a popular high school cheerleader of Sunnydale High, Cordelia starts her tenure on the show as a more vain and self-centered personality, but grows over the course of the series into a hero. Cordelia acquires Doyle's visions via a shared kiss prior to Doyle's death. With the death of Doyle in the ninth episode of the show's first season, another character from the Buffy series makes the jump to its spinoff: Wesley Wyndam-Pryce (Alexis Denisof) joins the team under the brave guise of "rogue demon hunter," acting as comic relief and initially not well accepted. Over time, Wesley shows bravery and strength as well as some cold-blooded killing ability, like his colleague Rupert Giles, and grows into a leader.

In season 2 of the show, Angel, Cordelia and Wesley are joined by Charles Gunn (J. August Richards), a young demon hunter who must initially adjust to working with and for a vampire. At the end of season 2, they travel to the demon world Pylea, where they save Winifred "Fred" Burkle (Amy Acker), a young Texan physicist whose social skills have become stunted after five years' captivity; she later grows to become more outspoken. Season 3 saw the introduction of Connor (Vincent Kartheiser), the "miracle" human-like child of two vampires, Angel and Darla. Abducted into a Hell dimension as a baby, he is raised by Angel's enemy Daniel Holtz, and only a few weeks after he left comes back as a teenager and reluctantly comes to accept his lineage. Although introduced during season 2, Lorne (Andy Hallett) joins the team during season 3. An outgoing, pacifist demon with prophetic and empathic abilities, Lorne's role is predominantly to support the team.

Season 5, the show's final season, introduces several new cast members, chief amongst them Spike (James Marsters), an old vampire ally/foe of Angel's who also starred in Buffy. In this series, Spike reluctantly fights beside Angel as their rivalry continues—now tinged with Spike existing as another vampire with a soul, and by the romantic feelings that both of them have for Buffy Summers. One of the legendary Old Ones, Illyria (Amy Acker) starts off as an adversary of the team after taking over Fred's body, but comes to join the team as she must learn to cope with the changed world and the new emotions she feels as a result of taking over a human. Finally, there's Harmony Kendall (Mercedes McNab), another Buffy alumna and former friend of Cordelia who was turned into a vampire. Resembling the old personality of Cordelia, Harmony is grudgingly accepted by Angel as his secretary when he takes over the Los Angeles branch of Wolfram & Hart.

Many characters on Angel made recurring appearances. The two longest-running recurring characters are Lilah Morgan (Seasons 1–4) and Lindsey McDonald (Seasons 1, 2, and 5), appearing in 36 and 21 episodes, respectively; Lindsey is the only character besides Angel to appear in both the first and last episode of the series. Angel's sire Darla (Julie Benz), first seen in Buffy, plays an expanded role on Angel and appears in 20 episodes over the course of the series. Elisabeth Röhm appears in 15 episodes (Seasons 1–2) as LAPD Detective Kate Lockley, a woman with an often-strained relationship with Angel.

Throughout the series, there were also guest appearances from Buffy characters, including main cast members Buffy Summers, Willow Rosenberg and Daniel "Oz" Osbourne. The rogue slayer Faith (Eliza Dushku) played an important part in episodes of Seasons 1, 2, and 4; Anne Steele and Andrew Wells also originated on Buffy and appeared in two or more Angel episodes. Whedon also used two actors from his cancelled television series Firefly, Gina Torres and Adam Baldwin, to play Jasmine and Marcus Hamilton, respectively.

== Setting and filming locations ==
Much of Angel was shot on location in Los Angeles, where it is also set. "Los Angeles" are the first words spoken in the premiere episode, and the cityscape is the first image seen in the opening credits. Joss Whedon said, "It is set in Los Angeles because there are a lot of demons in L.A. and a wealth of stories to be told." Producer Marti Noxon has expanded on this explanation: "Los Angeles was the place that Joss Whedon picked for very specific reasons. There's a lot of preconceptions about what the place is, but there are a lot of truths. It's a pretty competitive, intense town, where a lot of lonely, isolated, and desperate people end up. It's a good place for monsters." Many episodes feature references to the city, and the opening episode of the second season features Lorne offering this observation of the city:

In this city, you better learn to get along. Because L.A.'s got it all: the glamour and the grit, the big breaks and the heartaches, the sweet young lovers and the nasty, ugly, hairy fiends that suck out your brain through your face. It's all part of the big wacky variety show we call Los Angeles.

In the essay, "Los Angeles: The City of Angel" (from the essay collection, Reading Angel: The TV Spin-off With a Soul), Benjamin Jacob explores why Los Angeles in particular should be important to the series. Jacob suggests several explanations: first, the name connection ('City of Angels'); second, the double-sided nature, the "other side of the stereotypical sunshine city, Beach Boys and Walt Disney", "the place of pain, anonymity, alienation and broken dreams".; third, American noir was originally a "Los Angelian genre". Angel was originally conceived as supernatural noir. Noir had continued investigation of the "dark city, a place of regression and darkness as a counterpoint to the city's promise of progress and civilization" that had begun under William Blake and Charles Dickens.

During Season 1, Angel Investigations is based in Angel's apartment. Actor Alexis Denisof, who played Wesley Wyndam-Pryce, said: "Angel had this dark, foreboding, underground cellar apartment with columns, with this antique furniture all around, and this pokey little office upstairs" These offices were blown up at the climax of the first season, and Angel Investigations found a new base in the episode "Are You Now or Have You Ever Been".

Production designer Stuart Blatt outlined the new base: "An old hotel, something [the writers] could use to evoke the past of Los Angeles and some of Angel's history, something kind of creepy and spooky but not too dark because they didn't want something depressing, it's called the Hyperion Hotel. It's based on many hotels in Los Angeles... Angel lived in a larger suite in the hotel, like a honeymoon suite, the producers wanted Angel to have enough room to relax and get away from it all, do a little pondering, a little brooding, and a little research. Every once in a while, someone will come up to have a little conversation." In the final season, the team moves to the evil law firm, Wolfram & Hart.

== Format ==
Much like Buffy, Angel is told in a serialized format, with each episode involving a self-contained story while contributing to a larger storyline. Unlike Buffy, however, the season-long narratives are not marked by the rise and defeat of a powerful antagonist, commonly referred to as the "Big Bad" in the parent series. Instead, the overarching story of all five seasons of the series pitted Angel as the central player in a battle between the "good" Powers That Be and the "evil" law firm Wolfram & Hart and his possible role in a prophesied apocalypse. It mixes the complex, series-long storyline along with more stand-alone, villain-of-the-week episodes. The show blends different genres, including horror, fantasy, supernatural, and a combination of comedic and dramatic content.

Season 1 is mainly told in a "monster of the week" format, with each episode creating a self-contained story that took place around the title character. Later seasons became more serialized, where the majority of episodes contribute to a larger story arc that unfolded over many episodes. The most extreme example of this is season 4, in which almost every episode contributed to the main storyline, and often picked up exactly where the previous episode ended.

The series' narrative revolves around Angel and his colleagues, collectively making up the detective agency Angel Investigations, who fight against supernatural evils and work to "help the helpless". A typical episode contains one or more villains or supernatural phenomena that is thwarted or defeated, and one or more people in need of help, a few of whom Angel and associates are not able to assist (including some main characters) since episode one. Though elements and relationships are explored and ongoing subplots are included, the show focuses centrally on Angel and his road to redemption.

The most prominent monsters in the Angel bestiary are vampires, which are based on traditional myths, lore, and literary conventions. Angel and his companions fight a wide variety of demons, as well as ghosts, werewolves, zombies, and ethically unsound humans. They sometimes even save the world from annihilation by a combination of physical combat, magic, and detective-style investigation, and are guided by an extensive collection of ancient and mystical reference books. Visions from higher powers guide the group, and are received by Doyle and later Cordelia. Hand-to-hand combat is chiefly undertaken by Angel and later Gunn, though every member of Angel Investigations is combat-ready to some degree. Lorne is able to read peoples' destinies and intentions. Fred uses her scientific knowledge to contribute, whilst Wesley contributes his extensive knowledge of demonology and supernatural lore.

== Storylines ==
At the start of the series, Angel has just moved to Los Angeles. He is soon visited by Doyle, a messenger sent to him on behalf of The Powers That Be, enigmatic and ancient forces that assist the side of good. Doyle receives visions that can guide Angel on his mission as a champion of humankind. Angel also encounters Cordelia Chase, who is trying to launch an acting career. The three group together to form Angel Investigations, a detective agency that hopes to "help the hopeless" (later on "help the helpless"). When Doyle dies in the episode "Hero", he passes on his "visions" to Cordelia with a kiss. Shortly thereafter, the ex-Watcher, Wesley Wyndam-Pryce, joins the group. Meanwhile, the evil law firm Wolfram & Hart pay increasing attention to Angel. They tempt him toward darkness when they resurrect Darla, Angel's ex-lover and sire—killed by Angel in the first season of Buffy in the episode "Angel".

Charles Gunn, who was introduced toward the end of season 1 in the episode "War Zone", is a street-tough leader of a gang of vampire hunters. He is initially determined to kill Angel but slowly comes to accept him and join his cause throughout season 2. Wolfram & Hart's star lawyer Lindsey McDonald primes Darla as its weapon to bring down Angel. However, Darla is brought back as a human, not a vampire. But as a human, she suffers from a terminal case of syphilis—which she had contracted in her original life before being sired. Lindsey brings in Drusilla, a vampire originally sired by Angelus, to restore Darla to the cause of evil. Enraged by this, Angel begins to grow darker. He cuts himself off from his staff (secretly to keep them away from this kind of dark territory for their own sake) and attempts to go after the pair himself. In despair, Angel sleeps with Darla (cf. "Reprise") but the next morning, he has an epiphany; seeing the error of his ways, he banishes Darla and reunites with his group. When Cordelia vanishes, Lorne, the flamboyant demon owner of karaoke bar Caritas, reluctantly takes Angel and his crew to his home dimension, Pylea, to rescue her. They return with Winifred "Fred" Burkle, a former physics student who has been trapped in the dimension for five long years.

To get over news of the death of his ex-girlfriend, Buffy, Angel spends three months in a monastery, where he encounters some demon monks and goes home frustrated in season 3. He returns to Los Angeles, as does Darla—now bearing his child. Daniel Holtz, an old enemy of both Angel and Darla, is resurrected by a demon to take revenge on the vampires that killed his family. The group is puzzled over what might be the first vampire birth. Darla sacrifices her life to save the life of her child, Connor. The gang is eager to care for the infant, but Wesley soon learns of a (false) frightening prophecy that suggests that Angel will murder his son. Feeling disconnected from the group, Wesley does not share this information and quietly kidnaps Connor. This backfires as he is attacked and the child is seized by Holtz and his protégée Justine. Wanting Angel to suffer the loss of a child as he did, Holtz escapes through a rip in the fabric of space to the dimension of Quor'Toth, and raises the boy as his own. Angel feels that his son is lost forever and tries to murder Wesley. Though he survives, Wesley is banished from the group. Weeks later, Connor returns, but because time moves faster in Quor'Toth, he is now a teenage boy, having been raised by Holtz. Tricking Angel into believing he needs to be the one to take Connor in, Holtz gives Angel a letter letting Connor know that he will be leaving and to trust Angel. Holtz gets Justine to kill him but ends up making it look like a vampire attack so Connor will assume the worst. Connor imprisons his birth father, Angel, in a casket and drops it to the bottom of the ocean. Cordelia's visions have been progressively getting worse, and she becomes part demon to make them easier on herself. Her old lover, the Groosalugg, comes back from Pylea to be with her but leaves her when he discovers that she instead loves Angel. Cordelia, having been approached by a seeming agent of the Powers That Be with an offer to become a Higher Being, ascends to a higher dimensional plane at season's end.

Despite his exile from his old friends, Wesley locates and frees Angel at the beginning of season four. A hellish Beast emerges and blocks out the sun over L.A. He then proceeds to kill the staff at Wolfram & Hart. Although the city survives, the sunlight seems to have been vanquished permanently. The team resorts to releasing Angel's soul, believing Angelus knows helpful information about the beast. Although the team takes safety precautions, Angelus is released from his cell by Cordelia, who is, at the time, under the influence of the soon to be born Jasmine. Luckily, they manage to restore Angel's soul, thanks to help from Faith and Willow. Their efforts, however, do not prevent the coming of Jasmine, who was indirectly responsible for the work of the Beast. Jasmine, it turns out, was formerly one of the Powers That Be and plans to solve all the world's problems by giving humanity total happiness through spiritual enslavement to her. She arrives in our world through manipulation of Cordelia and Connor, using them as a conduit into our world, eventually forcing Cordelia to fall into a coma. Fred is accidentally inoculated against Jasmine's spell by contact with her blood and frees the rest of the gang though they remain hopelessly outnumbered by thousands already entranced by Jasmine. Angel travels through a magic portal into a world previously visited by Jasmine to find a way of breaking her power over L.A.'s populace. By revealing her true name, they are able to break Jasmine's spell over everyone. Jasmine confronts Angel but is then killed by Connor. Connor is revealed never to have been under Jasmine's influence, but he went along for the sake of having a semblance of family and happiness. In the season finale, they are met by Lilah Morgan, the resurrected Head of Wolfram & Hart's Special Project Division, who congratulates them on preventing world peace, and says that as a token of their appreciation, Wolfram & Hart would like to give them the Los Angeles branch. To help save Cordelia and Connor, who has gone mad with confusion over losing everything, Angel reluctantly agrees.

In season 5, the gang begins to settle into their new lives at Wolfram & Hart. Gunn undergoes a special cognitive procedure that transforms him into a brilliant lawyer. The group receives an amulet that resurrects a past companion of Angelus, the en-souled vampire Spike, initially as a ghost-like presence but later regains corporeal status due to the machinations of Lindsey McDonald in a surprise return. Cordelia, who has been in a coma, has The Powers That Be grant her one last request, in which she helps Angel get "back on track," then dies. Angel is briefly reunited with his son Connor, now in a new identity thanks to the agreement between Angel and Wolfram & Hart at the end of Season Four. Connor regains the memories of his former identity but does not acknowledge this to protect his new parents (though he later reveals to Angel that he does, in fact, remember his previous life). Fred finally declares her affections to Wesley, but shortly after is possessed by an ancient and powerful demon called Illyria. Wesley is devastated by the loss of Fred but agrees to help Illyria adjust to her new form and the unfamiliar world she is in. Angel, after getting one last vision from Cordelia before her death, infiltrates the Circle of the Black Thorn, a secret society responsible for engineering the Apocalypse, and plans to take them all out in a simultaneous, hard-hitting strike. Because this is probably a suicide mission, he tells each of his friends to spend the day as if it were their last. That night, the team launches its attack on the Circle, dividing up their targets. When Wesley is fatally stabbed, Illyria, concerned for his safety, arrives at his side after killing her targets but is unable to save him. Illyria asks Wesley if he'd like her to assume the form of Fred, and Wesley agrees, allowing him to say goodbye to the woman he loved. Lorne leaves and disappears into the night, his innocence destroyed after fulfilling Angel's last order to kill Lindsey, the former Wolfram & Hart lawyer who had turned his back on the firm. Angel confronts Senior Partners' new liaison Marcus Hamilton and defeats him with help from Connor.

Once the Circle has been dismantled, Angel and the surviving members of his gang rendezvous in the alley behind the Hyperion Hotel. Illyria arrives with news of Wesley's death and feels the need to retaliate in her anger and grief. Spike also arrives, triumphant about his successful mission and hungry for further violent fighting. Gunn emerges, staggering from a serious stomach wound, but ready to fight. The survivors wait as the Senior Partners' army of warriors, giants, and a dragon approaches. Angel, Spike, Gunn and Illyria prepare for the upcoming battle, with Angel saying, "Well, personally, I kind of want to slay the dragon." The series then ends with Angel saying, "Let's go to work," after which he and his team attack the army of monsters head-on.

== Production ==
=== Episodes ===
Season	Episodes	Originally released	
Season	Episodes	First released	Last released
1	22	October 5, 1999	May 23, 2000
2	22	September 26, 2000	May 22, 2001
3	22	September 24, 2001	May 20, 2002
4	22	October 6, 2002	May 7, 2003
5	22	October 1, 2003	May 19, 2004

=== Origins ===
Co-producer Greenwalt points out, "There's no denying that Angel grew out of Buffy." Several years before Angel debuted, Joss Whedon developed the concept behind Buffy the Vampire Slayer to invert the Hollywood formula of "the little blonde girl who goes into a dark alley and gets killed in every horror movie." The character Angel was first seen in the first episode and became a regular, appearing in the opening credits during seasons 2 and 3. According to the fictional universe first established by Buffy, the 'Buffyverse', Angel was born in 18th-century Ireland; after being turned into a soulless, immortal vampire, he became legendary for his evil acts, until a band of wronged Gypsies punished him by restoring his soul, overwhelming him with guilt. Angel eventually set out on a path of redemption, hoping that he could make up for his past through good deeds. In Buffy's Season Three finale, he leaves Sunnydale for L.A. to continue his atonement without Buffy. Whedon believed that "Angel was the one character who was bigger than life in the same way that Buffy was, a kind of superhero." Whedon has compared the series to its parent: "It's a little bit more straightforward action show and a little bit more of a guys' show."

While the central concept behind Buffy was "high school as a horror movie" in small-town America, co-creators David Greenwalt and Whedon were looking to make Angel into a different "gritty, urban show." Whedon explained, "We wanted a much darker show, darker in tone. It's set in Los Angeles because there are a lot of demons in L.A. and a wealth of stories to be told. We also wanted to take the show a little older and have the characters deal with demons in a much different way. Buffy is always the underdog trying to save the world, but Angel is looking for redemption. It's those two things that creatively make the shows different."

Whedon and Greenwalt prepared a six-minute promotional video pitch, often called the "Unaired Angel pilot" for The WB. Some shots from this short were later used in the opening credits.

Early during the life of the series, some effort was made to slightly soften the original concept. For example, scenes were cut from the pilot episode, "City of", in which Angel tasted the blood of a murder victim; the episode that was originally written to be the second episode, "Corrupt", was abandoned altogether. Writer David Fury explained, "The network was shocked. They said 'We can't shoot this. This is way too dark.' We were able to break a new idea, we had to turn it over in three days." Instead, the tone was lightened and the opening episodes established Angel Investigations as an idealistic, shoestring operation.

A first draft script reveals that Angel was originally intended to include the character Whistler, played by Max Perlich, who had already been featured in two Buffy episodes, "Becoming, Part One" and "Part Two". In an interview, Perlich said, "I never got called again. If they had called, I would have probably accepted because it was a great experience and I think Joss is very original and talented." Instead, the producers created a Whistler-like character, Doyle. Cordelia Chase, also from the original Sunnydale crew, joined Angel and Doyle.

=== Executive producers ===
Joss Whedon is credited as executive producer throughout the run of the series. Alongside Angel, he was also working on a series of other projects such as Buffy, Fray, Astonishing X-Men and Firefly, which would later also lead to the film Serenity.

For the first three seasons, David Greenwalt, who co-created the series with Whedon, was also credited as executive producer; during this time, he also took on the role of show runner. He left to oversee the ABC drama Miracles, but continued to work on Angel as a consulting producer for the final two seasons. Tim Minear also served as an executive producer during the second season, contributing heavily to the season's story arc. At the start of the fourth season, David Simkins was made showrunner and executive producer, but after three months, he left the show due to "creative differences" and is not credited in any episodes. Established Angel writer Jeffrey Bell took over for the balance of season 4 and became executive producer for season 5. After Buffy concluded, writer David Fury joined the staff as executive producer for the final season.

Fran Rubel Kuzui and her husband, Kaz Kuzui, were also credited as executive producers throughout Angel, but were not involved in any writing or production for the show. Jeffrey Bell mentions in his DVD commentary during the closing credits of the Angel series finale "Not Fade Away" that two people were credited and paid for Angel without needing to ever step on the set. Angel crew member Dan Kerns also revealed in an essay that two executive producers "received credit and sizeable checks for the duration of Buffy and Angel for doing absolutely nothing". Their credit, rights and royalties for the whole Buffy franchise, which includes spinoff Angel, relate to their funding, producing and directing of the original movie version of Buffy.

=== Writing ===
Script-writing was done by Mutant Enemy, a production company created by Joss Whedon in 1997. The writers with the most writing credits for the series include: Joss Whedon, David Greenwalt, Tim Minear, Jeffrey Bell, David Fury, Steven S. DeKnight, Mere Smith, and Elizabeth Craft and Sarah Fain. Other authors with writing credits include: Shawn Ryan, Ben Edlund, Drew Goddard, Jeannine Renshaw, Howard Gordon, Jim Kouf, Jane Espenson, Doug Petrie, Tracey Stern, David H. Goodman, Scott Murphy, Marti Noxon and Brent Fletcher.

Jane Espenson has explained how scripts came together for Mutant Enemy Productions series Buffy, Angel and Firefly: a meeting was held and an idea was floated (generally by Whedon) and the writers brainstormed to develop the central theme of the episode and the character development. Next, the staff met in the anteroom to Whedon's office to begin "breaking" the story into acts and scenes; the only one absent would be the writer working on the previous week's episode.

Next, the writers developed the scenes onto a marker-filled whiteboard, featuring a "brief ordered description of each scene." A writer was then selected to create an outline of the episode's concept– occasionally with some dialogue and jokes– in one day. The outline was then given to the show runner, who revised it within a day. The writer used the revised outline to write the first draft of the script while the other writers worked on developing the next. This first draft was usually submitted for revision within 3–14 days; afterward, a second (and sometimes third) draft was written. After all revisions were made, the final draft would be produced as the "shooting draft".

=== Music ===
Angel features a mix of original, indie, rock and pop music.

The opening theme was composed by Holly Knight and Darling Violetta, an alternative rock group that performed two songs during the third season of Buffy the Vampire Slayer. Holly Knight was the music producer of the track. The next year, Angel invited bands to submit demos for the theme music to the show. They asked bands to use "dark superhero ideas" and "Cello-rock". Darling Violetta watched pivotal Angel-related episodes of Buffy such as "Passion", "Becoming, Parts One and Two" for inspiration. Eventually, Whedon accepted Darling Violetta's interpretation of an Angel theme as that most suitable to the show. The theme has a slower tempo than the Buffy theme, as well as heavier use of acoustic instruments such as cello. In 2005, the band composed an extended version of the Angel theme called "The Sanctuary Extended Remix", which featured on the soundtrack of the series Angel: Live Fast, Die Never.

The demon karaoke bar, Caritas, is frequently used to spotlight pop hits. There has also been a soundtrack album, Angel: Live Fast, Die Never. The soundtrack mostly consists of scores created for the show by Robert J. Kral along with a remixed theme and four other songs from the show. Douglas Romayne scored 33 episodes of Angel in seasons 4 and 5, along with series lead composer, Rob Kral.

=== Cancellation ===
On February 14, 2004, the WB Network announced that Angel would not be brought back for a sixth season. The one-paragraph statement indicated that the news, which had been reported by an Internet site the previous day, had been leaked well before the network intended to make its announcement. Joss Whedon posted a message on a popular fan site, The Bronze: Beta, in which he expressed his dismay and surprise, saying he was "heartbroken" and described the situation as "Healthy Guy Falls Dead From Heart Attack." Fan reaction was to organize letter-writing campaigns, online petitions, blood and food drives, advertisements in trade magazines and via mobile billboards, and attempts to lobby other networks. UPN was a favorite target, as it had already picked up Buffy, but the network declined. Outrage for the cancellation focused on Jordan Levin, WB's Head of Entertainment. It was the second highest-rated program to be canceled on the WB.

Head writer David Fury "guaranteed" that if Joss Whedon had not requested an early renewal, Angel would have been back for a Season 6, saying Whedon's request for an early pick-up decision put Levin in a corner, forcing him to cancel the show, adding simply waiting would have gotten the show renewed. Marsters made a similar statement, saying cancellation took the cast and production staff "completely by surprise". He said in 2021 that Spike's addition to the show prevented cancellation after four seasons, although his request for a salary equal to what he was paid on Buffy caused Whedon to remove Carpenter from the main cast.

Angel's final episode, "Not Fade Away", aired on the WB on May 19, 2004. The ambiguous final moments left some fans hoping for the continuation of Angel and the Buffyverse in the future - hopes that came to fruition in November 2007 with the publication of the first issue of the comic book series Angel: After the Fall. The series is Joss Whedon's official continuation of the Angel television series and follows in the footsteps of the comic book Buffy the Vampire Slayer Season Eight, whose first issue was published in March 2007.

== Themes ==
While Buffy the Vampire Slayer was built around the angst of adolescence, Angel chronicles the different stages of adulthood after one leaves home and begins working. Cordelia Chase, who had been the most popular and superficial girl in Sunnydale High on Buffy, develops over the course of the series from an insecure young woman struggling in a daunting real world into an unexpectedly mature woman. Similarly, Wesley, the once uptight and bookish Watcher, becomes a man of quiet confidence and often ruthless action.

Angel screenshot from the opening credits. Taking place in a dark metropolis, Angel often alluded to the noir detective genre that influenced the show.

In much the same way as Buffy had been both an homage and parody of traditional horror films, Angel gave the same treatment to the classical film noir. Producer Kelly Manners said "Angel is a dark show about a man looking for redemption... We have an alcoholic metaphor with Angel. Angel is a guy who is one drink away from going back to his evil roots" He attempts to find redemption through helping the helpless of Los Angeles in a fashion similar to that of noir detectives. The first episode even included a Philip Marlowe-style voiceover. Angel filled the role of the reluctant, streetwise detective who has dealings with a variety of underworld characters. In this case, the "underworld" is a literal underworld of demons and supernatural beings. In one instance, Angel is explicitly compared with fictional noir private-detective Marlowe. Many traditional noir stories and characters were explored in earlier episodes, including the ditzy but attractive secretary, the cagey but well-informed partner, and clashes with crooked lawyers, femme fatales and meddlesome, too-good-for-their-own-good cops. These were usually given a modern or supernatural twist.

The style and focus of the show changed considerably over its run, and starting late in season two the original noir idea was mostly discarded in favor of more large-scale supernatural-themed conflicts. In later seasons, the mythology and stories became increasingly complex; in Season Four, one of the characters on the show itself described the storyline as "a turgid supernatural soap opera." Whereas the show initially dealt with the difficulty of being kind to people on a personal basis, the show ultimately focused on Angel's status as an archetypal Champion for humanity, and explored ideas such as moral ambiguity, the spiritual cost of violence, and the nature of free will. The enduring theme throughout the series was the struggle for redemption.

Angel explored trust motifs as an increasingly central focus of the show. In the first two seasons, there were sprinklings of deceit and treachery, but in the last three seasons duplicity began to pervade the thematic structure, culminating in Season Five when almost every episode included some kind of double-cross, trickery, or illusion. An idea presented in Season Three was that even prophecy can betray, as they are often deceiving if not plain lies. In Season Five, it is repeatedly emphasized that the characters can trust no one in their new situation. The series is also notable for harsh betrayals within the cast of main characters; such events often having lethal consequences.

Angel depicted the feelings of loneliness, danger, and callousness often attributed to the urban Los Angeles megalopolis. The divisions between the ordered world of the day and the chaotic world of the night have been trademark themes of noir and by depicting a protagonist who literally has no daytime life, the series was able to explore these same themes in more dramatic, metaphorical ways. As the series progressed, the creators were able to explore darker aspects of the characters, particularly Angel, who commits a number of morally questionable actions, and periodically reverts to his evil persona Angelus.

== Home media ==
The series was released to DVD, produced by 20th Century Fox Home Entertainment, from 2001 to 2005.

DVD	Original release date	
DVD	US	UK
The Complete First Season	February 11, 2003	December 10, 2001
The Complete Second Season	September 2, 2003	April 15, 2002
The Complete Third Season	February 10, 2004	March 3, 2003
The Complete Fourth Season	September 7, 2004	March 1, 2004
The Complete Fifth Season	February 15, 2005	February 21, 2005
Special Collectors Set	October 30, 2007	October 30, 2006

In 2009, the DVDs were repackaged into slimmer cases, which resemble regular DVD packaging.

== Reception ==
=== Critical response ===
The first season has a 91% approval rating on Rotten Tomatoes based on 46 reviews, with an average rating of 7.4/10. The website's critics consensus reads, "Angel builds on the solid sex appeal of its lead, forging an unexpectedly worthy spinoff that draws viewers in with character depth, clever humor, and a suitably dark and brooding backdrop." On Metacritic, the season scored 75 out of 100, based on 20 reviews, indicating "generally favorable" reviews. The fifth and final season has a 93% approval rating on Rotten Tomatoes based on 14 reviews, with an average rating of 8/10. The website's critics consensus reads, "Angel's final season concludes the series with a creative resurgence that restores the show's signature blend of humor and horror, ending on a bittersweet high note that should satisfy fans while leaving them wishing there could have been more."

Sarah Hughes of The Independent stated, "The LA-set spin-off to Buffy was initially dismissed as the original's poor cousin but gradually developed into a darkly entertaining show in its own right." Stefan Mohamed writing for Den of Geek stated "It occupied an interesting position in the cultural landscape, airing alongside shows like The Sopranos and The Shield as the more standalone episodic format of syndicated '90s TV gave way to the more heavily serialized "prestige TV" era – and like those critically acclaimed shows, it leaned heavily into moral ambiguity." Entertainment Weekly put Angel number 8 on its list of the greatest spinoffs of all time, and stated "Angel tackled darker themes than its predecessor while still maintaining the quippy lightness that makes Joss Whedon’s masterpieces, well, masterpieces." IndieWire put Angel at number 11 on its top 20 best spinoffs of all time, saying "Taking the Buffy the Vampire Slayer mantle and making it more about investigating than hunting, Angel used its neo-noir setup for an edgier entry into the Joss Whedon TV canon."

=== U.S. ratings ===
Viewership and ratings per season of Angel
Season	Timeslot (ET)	Episodes	First aired		Last aired		TV season	Viewership rank	Avg. viewers (millions)
Season	Timeslot (ET)	Episodes	Date	Viewers (millions)	Date	Viewers (millions)	TV season	Viewership rank	Avg. viewers (millions)
1	Tuesday 9:00 pm	22	October 5, 1999	7.47	May 23, 2000	4.52	1999–2000	N/A	4.8
2	Tuesday 9:00 pm	22	September 26, 2000	6.09	May 22, 2001	4.84	2000–01	N/A	4.2
3	Monday 9:00 pm	22	September 24, 2001	5.01	May 20, 2002	4.64	2001–02	127	4.2
4	Sunday 9:00 pm (1–7); Wednesday 9:00 pm (8–22)	22	October 6, 2002	4.57	May 7, 2003	3.95	2002–03	138	3.65
5	Wednesday 9:00 pm	22	October 1, 2003	5.16	May 19, 2004	5.31	2003–04	162	3.97

In two of the four seasons when both shows were in production, Buffy's overall yearly ratings were higher than Angel's.

=== Awards and nominations ===
Angel gathered a number of awards. the International Horror Guild Award for Best Television in 2001. It received many awards and nominations from the Saturn Awards which are presented annually by the Academy of Science Fiction, Fantasy & Horror Films: it won Best Network TV Series in 2004 and David Boreanaz won Best TV Actor in 2000, 2003, and 2004. Specific episodes, "Waiting in the Wings", "Smile Time", and "Not Fade Away", were nominated for Hugo Awards for Best Dramatic Presentation, Short Form in 2003 and 2005.

== Spin-offs ==
Angel, itself a spinoff from Buffy, has in turn inspired a whole "industry" of books, comics, and merchandise.

=== Expanded universe ===
Outside of the TV series, Angel has been officially expanded and elaborated on by authors and artists in the so-called "Buffyverse Expanded Universe". The creators of these works may or may not keep to established continuity. Similarly, writers for the TV series were under no obligation to use information which had been established by the Expanded Universe and sometimes contradicted such continuity.

Many of these works are set at particular times within the Buffyverse. For example, Joss Whedon has written an Angel mini-series of comics, Long Night's Journey, which was specifically set in early Angel Season Two. Angel comics were originally published by Dark Horse Comics, which published them from 2000 until 2002. IDW Publishing obtained rights to publish Angel comics in 2005 and has been releasing them since. Spinning off from the Angel comics comes an entire series of Spike comics, using the Angel logo's typeface in its depiction of the name "Spike", among these are the comics Spike vs. Dracula, Spike: Asylum and Spike: Shadow Puppets. As of November 2007 to February 2009, the story of the series was continued canonically in lieu of a Season Six in a 17-issue maxi-series titled Angel: After the Fall, written by Brian Lynch and plotted by both Lynch and Joss Whedon. This spun off into numerous Angel titles set after the television series, of which all are now considered canon, until 2011 when Angel rights revert to Dark Horse Comics who began to publish Angel comics under the banner of Angel & Faith.

Following their success with a series of Buffy novels, Pocket Books purchased the license to produce novels for Angel. Twenty-four Angel novels were published. Jeff Mariotte became the most successful Angel novelist, publishing eleven Angel novels. They also published seven Buffy/Angel crossover books that featured settings and characters from both series.

=== Undeveloped spin-offs ===
In March 2006, Joss Whedon still talked of the possibility of a TV movie involving Spike to be written and directed by Tim Minear.

=== Merchandise ===
Angel has inspired magazines and companion books, as well as countless websites, online discussion forums, and works of fan fiction. Eden Studios have published an Angel role-playing game.

== See also ==
- List of vampire television series
