= Music in Buffy the Vampire Slayer and Angel =

The use of music was a key component in the fictional Buffyverse established by the TV shows Buffy the Vampire Slayer and Angel. Many actors of both series are professional singers/musicians, including Anthony Head, James Marsters, Amber Benson, Andy Hallett and Christian Kane.

== Themes ==
=== Buffy theme ===
The "Buffy theme" is the music played alongside the opening credits of the show. The theme itself has no lyrics; it begins with several notes played by an organ, a signifier for horror in movie culture from the 1930s onwards, followed by upbeat rock music.

The theme was played by the pop punk band Nerf Herder. In an interview the band explained how they came to produce the theme:

"[The Buffy production staff] had hired some famous theme song composer to come up with a theme and they didn't like the one he came up with so they were kind of on a low budget, and asked local bands to come up with theme song ideas."

In the DVD commentary for "Welcome to the Hellmouth", Whedon explained that part of his decision to select Nerf Herder's theme was that Alyson Hannigan had made him listen to the band's music. Nerf Herder later recorded a second version of the theme which was used for the opening titles from season 3 on.

In 1999, Nerf Herder lead singer Parry Gripp gave the background on the writing of the melody. The original melody was written before Whedon contacted the band asking them to submit a demo for a theme tune, and was not written specifically for the show:

"We did the theme song before the show was on the air. It was a song that had already been written, but we really didn't know where to take it. I had some ideas - it was originally going to have some kind of science fiction theme, which is weird, because we don't do songs like that. I remember having the title of 'Outer Space Rock' or something like that; that was a working thing".

=== Angel theme ===
Darling Violetta is an alternative rock group that had performed two songs, "Cure" and "Blue Sun" in the Buffy episode "Faith, Hope & Trick." They cowrote the song with songwriter Holly Knight.

The following year, Angel invited bands to submit demos for the theme music to the show. They asked bands to use "dark superhero ideas" and "Cello-rock". Darling Violetta and Knight watched key Angel-related episodes of Buffy such as "Passion", "Becoming, Part One" and "Becoming, Part Two" for inspiration. Eventually Whedon accepted their interpretation of an Angel theme as the most suitable for the show. The theme has a slower tempo than the Buffy theme, and heavier use of acoustic instruments such as cello and violin.

In 2005, Holly Knight and the band composed an extended version of the Angel theme called "The Sanctuary Extended Remix", which featured on the soundtrack of the series Live Fast - Die Never. Joss Whedon and Alexis Denisof sing their own lyrics to the theme song in the DVD commentary to the episode "Spin the Bottle".

== Score ==
Many people have worked on the scoring of Buffy and Angel. Some of the main composers were:

=== Walter Murphy ===
Walter Murphy was the main composer on the first season of Buffy.

=== Christophe Beck ===
Christophe Beck was the main composer on Buffy during seasons 2-4. He composed two more episodes after that: "The Gift" and "Once More, with Feeling" (which was a contractual obligation, having signed on before he left the series). An album dedicated to his compositions for the show, entitled Buffy the Vampire Slayer: The Score, was released on September 9, 2008 by Rounder Records. In early February 2018, La La Land Records released a limited edition 4CD set of scoring from the show including many of the suites from the two promotional score CDs as well as some new cues, and scoring by other composers and Carter Burwell's score to the film.

Beck's music for the show includes:

- "Close Your Eyes" plays during "Becoming". This song incorporates the "Buffy/Angel Love Theme" that is used significantly throughout seasons 2 and 3, and appears on Buffy the Vampire Slayer: The Album.
- "Remembering Jenny" plays after the death of Jenny Calendar ("Passion"). This song also features backing vocals from Anthony Head, who played Rupert Giles on the show.
- "Slayer's Elegy" plays during the final assault of "The Wish".
- "Loneliness of Six" plays at the end of "Lovers Walk" as various heartbroken characters walk off in different directions.
- "Sacrifice" plays when Buffy sacrifices herself for her sister and for the world ("The Gift"). This appears on the soundtrack for "Once More, With Feeling" along with Beck's suites from "Restless" and "Hush".
- "I'm Game" plays at the end of the penultimate episode of Angel ("Power Play") as the group decides to launch a suicidal final assault against the Circle of the Black Thorn. "I'm Game" was the theme used throughout the series whenever there was a need for "heroic music", and debuted in the first episode ("City Of"), when Angel resolves to fight evil in Los Angeles.

=== Thomas Wanker ===
Thomas Wanker was the main composer for the majority of the 5th and 6th seasons of Buffy. His work tended to be subtle, and was described by one reviewer as "unassuming mysterious underscore". In "Shadow" and "Into the Woods", some of his tragic melodies are used in musical montages shown as Buffy and Dawn cope with their mother's illness, and Riley's feelings of alienation from Buffy.

=== Robert J. Kral ===
Robert J. Kral was the main composer for the series Angel, writing the music for 112 episodes for seasons 1 through 5. Initially hired by Christophe Beck for Season 1 with shared credit, Kral was employed by 20th Century Fox directly for Seasons 2 through 5. Kral worked for Beck on initial episodes, with Kral then writing most of the episodes for season one. Kral employed Zoran Boris and Douglas Romayne to write additional music for the final two seasons. The soundtrack Live Fast, Die Never mostly consists of his scores from throughout Angel. Fans were asked to nominate their favorite tracks and the resulting poll determined the bulk of the soundtrack released by Rounder, EMI and 20th Century Fox Television.

Music scenes and themes composed by Kral for Angel include:

- "Hero" for the character Doyle
- "Darla's Theme" which recurs throughout the series
- "Rebellion" for an episode with crossover plots and characters from Buffy
- "Home" for Angel's son Connor, as he eventually lives out his life with no memory of his father
- "Darla's Sacrifice" for an intense change in the story arc of the series
- "Pylea", which features a score style change for several complete episodes in a different "dimension" of medieval style fantasy
- "Vespa Chase", featuring a comedic motorcycle chase through Italy
- "The End Of The World"

=== Robert Duncan ===
Robert Duncan is credited as composer for Buffy episodes 7.02 and 7.04-7.22. His tracks included:

- "Chosen", Buffy and Spike's love theme, Faith and Robin's theme, and the theme of Slayer Victory during the fight in the Hellmouth.
- "Every Girl, A Slayer", which plays while Buffy proposes her idea to overcome the First.

=== Douglas Romayne ===
Douglas Romayne was hired by Joss Whedon to score episodes of Buffy season 7. He scored additional music for 33 episodes of Angel seasons four and five for Robert J. Kral. He was Associate Music Director on the Buffy musical "Once More, with Feeling", which was nominated for an Emmy for Outstanding Music Direction (C. Beck and J. Tobias nominated). He also arranged Whedon's song "Mrs" in "Selfless". His tracks included:

- "In Westbury Field", which plays when Giles is introduced in England ("Lessons")
- The suite of "Istanbul", "Just In Time" and "Lesson One" is the score to the opening sequence of the season, showing a slayer being chased and murdered in Turkey, Buffy training Dawn to fight vampires, and Buffy's worries about the new school ("Lessons")
- "On The Mend", which plays when Buffy helps Willow heal from the Gnarl ("Same Time, Same Place")
- "Another Way Out", which plays when Angel, Wes, Lilah, Fred and Connor are trying to escape the Beast, set loose at Wolfram and Hart ("Habeas Corpses")
- "Chasing Lilah" ("Calvary")
- "Cordy's Journey", which plays over a montage of scenes showing that Cordy is possessed ("Inside Out")
- "The Hellmouth", which plays when Spike magically appears in Angel's office straight from the Buffy series finale ("Unleashed")
- "Puppet Fight", which plays when Angel, transformed into a puppet, has a showdown with evil puppets taking over the lives of children in LA ("Smile Time")
- "One Day To Live", which plays while Angel and the gang try to save Fred from dying of a mystical disease ("A Hole in the World")

== The Bronze ==
The Bronze is a nightclub in Sunnydale, which hosts live music and serves as a key place where the Scooby Gang spend time for leisure. In the opening episodes, Sprung Monkey and Dashboard Prophets establish that much of the music featured at the club is alternative rock and roll, though numerous styles of music are also later heard, including trip hop, ballad and new wave/electronic music. The Bronze appears in 66 of the 144 episodes of Buffy.

The production team used the setting of The Bronze to showcase new bands from the Los Angeles area, as well as more well-known artists and bands such as Aimee Mann, Cibo Matto and Michelle Branch.

Key musical moments at the Bronze include:

- Buffy and Angel dancing to Sophie Zelmani's "I'll Remember You" ("Angel")
- Buffy taunting Angel by intimately dancing with Xander to Cibo Matto's "Sugar Water" ("When She Was Bad")
- Buffy and Faith flirtatiously dancing to Curve's "Chinese Burn" ("Bad Girls")
- Jonathan, the superstar, performs various hits from Royal Crown Revue ("Superstar")
- Oz, along with the other Scoobies, hears the band, "Shy" (a fictional front for the real-life band, T.H.C.), and their lead singer Veruca ("Beer Bad"/"Wild at Heart")
- Giles performs "Exposition Song" with Christophe Beck and Four Star Mary ("Restless")
- Willow and Tara dance together during Melanie Doane's "I Can't Take My Eyes Off You" ("Family")
- Michelle Branch plays "Goodbye to You" ("Tabula Rasa"), a performance which became particularly popular amongst fans due to the meaning of the episode, which featured the break-up of Willow and Tara; the departure of Giles to England; and the beginning of Buffy and Spike's relationship). The version used on the show was slightly different from the radio version.
- The Breeders performed in the episode "Him" that aired November 5, 2002.
- Angie Hart performs "Blue" with her band Splendid. The song was co-written by Hart and Joss Whedon ("Conversations with Dead People")
- Aimee Mann performs "This Is How It Goes" and "Pavlov's Bell" ("Sleeper")

== Dingoes Ate My Baby ==
Oz's band Dingoes Ate My Baby appeared on the show many times. The name alludes to the widespread news coverage of the death of nine-week-old Azaria Chamberlain in Australia in 1980. The real band that provided the music for Dingoes Ate My Baby was Four Star Mary; the song titles below are Four Star Mary tracks.

Episode	Location	Songs
"Inca Mummy Girl"	The Bronze	"Fate" & "Shadows"
"Bewitched, Bothered and Bewildered"	The Bronze	"Pain"
"Dead Man's Party"	Buffy's House	"Never mind," "Pain" & "Sway"
"Homecoming"	The Bronze	"She knows"
"Band Candy"	The Bronze	"Violent"
"Revelations"	The Bronze	"Run"
"Living Conditions"	Buffy's dorm room	"Pain" (on stereo)
"The Harsh Light of Day"	The Bronze	"Dilate"
"The Initiative"	The Bronze	"Fate" (on stereo)

== Lorne and Caritas ==
Lorne was born in a dimension called Pylea, a world without music. In 1996, he came across a dimensional portal and was sucked through it, landing in Los Angeles where he discovered music and culture. Soon after he opened up a karaoke bar, Caritas, where he honed the ability to read people's auras when they sang and he could give those people direction.

Some key musical moments include:

- The first song from Caritas seen on screen is Lorne singing Gloria Gaynor's "I Will Survive" ("Judgment"). Lorne was seen in many more Season 2 episodes singing at his bar.
- In the same episode, Angel, a long-time fan of Barry Manilow, sang "Mandy". When he needed guidance once again he chose Wang Chung's "Everybody Have Fun Tonight" ("Dear Boy").
- Cordy, Wes and Gunn drunkenly sing Queen's "We Are The Champions" after they have been sacked from Angel Investigations ("Redefinition").
- Darla sings Ella Fitzgerald's "Ill Wind" when asking Lorne for advice ("The Trial").
- Lindsey McDonald sings "L.A. Song", with music and lyrics written by David Greenwalt ("Dead End"). Eve also sang a part of this song to Lorne to make sure she didn't have anything to do with what was happening to Fred ("A Hole In The World").
- The last performance seen at Caritas was Patsy Cline's "Crazy", sung by Fred ("That Old Gang of Mine").
- After the destruction of Caritas in the Angel finale, Lorne visits another bar and sings Regina Belle's "If I Ruled The World" ("Not Fade Away").

== Shy ==
After Veruca makes a brief solo appearance ("Living Conditions"), her band Shy appears in two episodes. Shy performs "Overfire" at The Bronze in "Beer Bad", and plays two other songs, "Dip" and "Need to Destroy" (rehearsal), in "Wild at Heart". Shy's music was actually performed by THC, a Los Angeles-based trip hop duo consisting of singer/lyricist Sarah Folkman and producer/composer/musician George Sarah. The three songs featured on Buffy appear on THC's 1999 album Adagio.

== Velvet Chain ==
Following their appearance in "Never Kill a Boy on the First Date", Velvet Chain released The Buffy EP in February 1999, featuring "Strong" and "Treason" from their debut album Warm (1997), which they had performed on the show. The EP's title track, "Buffy", is a retelling of the relationship between Buffy and Angel during seasons 1 and 2 of the show.

== Sarah McLachlan ==
Sarah McLachlan's music is used twice on Buffy at key moments, in the finales of Seasons 2 and 6.

- In "Becoming, Part Two", "Full of Grace" plays as Buffy leaves Sunnydale. The song and Buffy's abandonment signify the character reaching an all-time low.
- At the end of the sixth season in "Grave", "Prayer of St. Francis" plays as Buffy climbs out of the ground with Dawn. The song is about overcoming that which is wrong, and renewal. The song appears in the U.S. version of Radio Sunnydale, but not in the UK one.

== Buffyverse discography ==
A number of CD releases have been released linked to the Buffyverse:

Buffyverse discography	Release date
Buffy film soundtrack	1992
Buffy the Vampire Slayer: The Album	1999
Once More, with Feeling	2002
Radio Sunnydale	2003
Angel: Live Fast, Die Never	2005
Buffy the Vampire Slayer: The Score	2008
Buffy the Vampire Slayer Collection	2018
