= Time Bomb (Angel) =

- Angel episode
- Episode no.: Season 5 Episode 19
- Directed by: Vern Gillum
- Written by: Ben Edlund
- Production code: 5ADH19
- Original air date: April 28, 2004

Guest appearances
- Jaime Bergman as Amanda; Jeff Yagher as Fell Leader; Adam Baldwin as Marcus Hamilton; Nick Gilhool as Fell Brother #1

Episode chronology
← Previous "Origin"	Next → "The Girl in Question"
- Angel season 5

"Time Bomb" is the 19th episode of the fifth season of the American television series Angel. Written by Ben Edlund and directed by Vern Gillum, it was originally broadcast on April 28, 2004 on the WB network.

In "Time Bomb", Illyria rescues Gunn from the hell dimension he entered in penance for his role in Fred's death. While Angel negotiates a contract between a group of demons and a pregnant woman whose unborn child the demons believe to be their Messiah, Illyria begins uncontrollably looping through time, until Wesley shunts her excess power into another dimension.

This is a crucial episode in the Illyria arc, because Team Angel are able to diminish her powers until she can only help them and can no longer destroy the Earth.

== Plot ==
The episode opens with Gunn still being tortured by a demon in a hell dimension, when he is suddenly rescued by Illyria, who uses her ability to shift between dimensions to return them both to Wolfram & Hart.

Gunn enters Wesley's office, and both have so much emotional baggage, they are uncertain how to behave. Wesley acknowledges that he should apologize for stabbing him earlier but is unsure how as he feels it would just be awkward. Gunn replies he is not looking for an apology and he probably wouldn't accept one anyway, adding that his torture in the hell dimension was much worse.

Meanwhile, Angel grows suspicious of Illyria's continued presence at the Firm, and concludes that she is staying not out of loyalty, but because of an attraction to the Firm's power. He orders Lorne to shadow her, and then turns his attention to a legal case involving a ceremonial demon pact. A pregnant woman named Amanda has agreed to allow a demonic cult called "the Fell Brethren" to adopt her baby, and Angel and Gunn start to advise her until they learn, to their outrage, that their client is not the innocent woman, but rather the seemingly benevolent demons who are secretly taking advantage of her and planning to sacrifice the child on the eve of its 13th birthday.

Meanwhile, Illyria enjoys sparring with Spike in the training room, perhaps because he does not kowtow to her, and is even learning to adapt to her fighting techniques, but she begins to act oddly even by her standards, and Wesley theorizes that she is growing emotionally and molecularly unstable as a result of her interdimensional travels. He realizes that if her energy excess continues to go unchecked, it will result in a catastrophic explosion.

As Angel, Gunn, and Hamilton argue over how to handle the Fell Brethren case, Illyria grows increasingly disoriented and paranoid, culminating in a confrontation in which she effortlessly kills Angel, Lorne, Spike, and Wesley in a matter of seconds. At this point, the narrative switches to her point of view, and it is revealed that Illyria's disorientation has been caused by the fact that her excessive mystical energy has been sending her uncontrollably back and forth in time.

Illyria again goes back in time to a point before she had killed the other characters, and she inadvertently begins taking Angel with her on her trips through time. Angel learns of the deaths of his friends and is horrified. After Illyria gives him advice about power, she explodes and likely decimates the continental shelf, but the explosion is so powerful it blasts Angel back in time to before Illyria killed everyone. This time, thanks to what Illyria told him, Angel is able to disrupt Illyria's attack and avoid the massacre. Illyria accuses Angel and Wesley of plotting to kill her with Wesley's massive ray gun, the Mutari generator, but Wesley reveals that the gun is not meant to kill her, but rather to disperse her excessive energy and thus prevent the fatal explosion. Spike briefly holds his own fighting Illyria until she uses her time control powers on him, giving Wesley the chance to activate the Mutari generator in time. Illyria is left emotionally devastated by the resulting loss of some of her super powers.

Angel returns his attention to the Fell Brethren case, and shocks Gunn by agreeing to represent the demons rather than the blithely naïve pregnant woman, having apparently taken Illyria's advice about power.

== Acting ==
The role of Amanda was played by Jaime Bergman, David Boreanaz's wife. Of the experience, Boreanaz says, "[it was] great to have her come on to the show, and have our son look at that, and see the two of us actually play opposite one another for a brief moment." He adds, "We had fun with it. It was nothing too serious, it was just a small little role, a laugh."

== Production details ==
J. Sherman compares the scene in which Illyria descends into hell to rescue Gunn as a "riff on the Orpheus theme".

=== Arc significance ===
Illyria's statement to Angel about how to win a war helps Angel to form his plan against Wolfram & Hart. It begins in the final scene, where he appears to forfeit the unborn child, but is not fully revealed until "Power Play". His plan ends in "Not Fade Away" when Angel and his team go up against the Circle of the Black Thorn.

== Critical response ==
Writing for The A.V. Club, Noel Murray writes that he finds two important issues for this episode: first, "Illyria's worldview sounds so persuasive: Raw self-interest is so much easier than trying to adhere to some kind of impossibly complicated code of behavior," and, second, "its structure":

"which takes its cues from what's happening to Illyria. As her power swells and begins to crack the container that is Fred's body, Illyria keeps slipping back in time, reliving conversations and moments of action, and sometimes taking the people around her along for the ride. For example, we see Illyria kill Wes, Lorne, Spike, and Angel, then slip back to a moment before that all happened, thus giving Angel a chance to prevent it. This is also relevant to what's happening to our heroes, who have been weighing every option and considering the consequences, and to some extent over the past few episodes have been getting chances at a do-over. Stuck in a suburban hell, Gunn doesn't make a deal to get back what he had; while Wes does essentially make the same bad decisions regarding Connor that he did before. Even the character of Illyria is something a repeat, in that she's like a meaner version of Jasmine."
