= Douglas Romayne =

- Birth name: Douglas Stevens
- Born: June 21, 1964; Corning, New York, U.S.
- Genres: Film score
- Occupation(s): Score mockups, proofer, composer, songwriter
- Instrument(s): Guitar, keyboards
- Years active: 1998–

Douglas Romayne (born Douglas Romayne Stevens on June 21, 1964, in Corning, NY) is a professional musician whose work includes creating scores, score mockups and proofing. In 2018 he began performing as a singer-songwriter at many of the California wineries and breweries of the central coast.

Douglas Romayne and KJ Vickery, co-own Bleu Jean Music and Back Pocket, their professional music production studio.

Romayne's education includes a BA in music composition from Cornerstone College. He studied music and advanced orchestration at the University of Chicago and DePaul University with Cliff Colnot, New Music Conductor of the Chicago Symphony Orchestra, and music composition with Hans Wurman. In Los Angeles he attended the University of Southern California, Thornton School of Music Program, where he studied scoring for motion pictures and television under Christopher Young and Elmer Bernstein, among others.

Romayne also studied orchestration and advanced conducting at the University of California, Los Angeles.

Two years after graduating from the USC program, Romayne was hired by Joss Whedon to score his series Buffy the Vampire Slayer.

His awards include a BMI Film Music Award for his work at the USC Film Scoring Program and a Park City Film Music Festival Gold Medal for Outstanding Achievement in Film Music. He was nominated for Best Use of Score by the Film & TV Music Academy.

He also co-scored with lead composer Robert Kral the WB Animation series Duck Dodgers episode "Invictus Interruptus", which won the Annie Award for Outstanding Music in an Animated Television Production.

== Buffyverse ==
Memorable tracks by Douglas Romayne from Buffy (season 7) and Angel (seasons 4 and 5) include the following:

Buffy the Vampire Slayer:

- "In Westbury Field" plays when Giles is introduced in England in the episode "Lessons"
- The suite of "Istanbul", "Just in Time" and "Lesson One" is the score to the opening sequence of episode 7.01, from the point where a slayer is being chased and murdered in Turkey to Buffy's worries about the new school, in "Lessons"
- "It's About Power" underscores the final scene in "Lessons" when The One transforms itself
- "On The Mend" plays when Buffy helps Willow heal from the Gnarl in "Same Time, Same Place"
- "Mrs" – music and lyrics by Joss Whedon, song arranged and produced by Douglas Romayne, and sung by Anya in "Selfless"

Angel:

- "Another Way Out" plays when Angel, Wes, Lilah, Fred and Connor are trying to escape the Beast, set loose at Wolfram and Hart, in "Habeas Corpses"
- "Chasing Lilah" plays in episode 4.12 "Calvary"
- "Cordy's Journey" plays over a montage of scenes showing that Cordy is possessed in "Inside Out"
- "The Hellmouth" plays when Spike magically appears in Angel's office straight from Buffy episode 7.22, in "Unleashed"
- "Puppet Fight" plays when Angel, transformed into a puppet, has a showdown with evil puppets in "Smile Time"
- "One Day To Live" plays while Angel and the gang try to prevent Fred from dying of a mystical disease in "A Hole in the World"

== Albums ==
Douglas Romayne's first film score album, Expressing the Inexpressible, is a compilation of eight film scores available at iTunes, MovieScore Media and CD Baby.

Film Score Monthly's Steven A. Kennedy wrote that the album "is a fabulous demonstration of Romayne's ability to create melodic, large-sounding scores in many genres", and that it "is highly recommended for those interested in hearing a voice that we can only hope will move on to more high profile assignments".

Mark Hasan of KQEK wrote, "It's hard to come out from under the shadow of a cult TV series like Buffy the Vampire Slayer and Angel, but this compilation CD featuring selections from 8 scores by Douglas Romayne is both a superb promo for the composer's skillful writing, and an addictive album, particularly for film music fans wanting music with a rich, elegant orchestral sound."

== Awards ==
Year	Award	Event	Film or TV episode
2009	Director's Choice Award, Gold Medal for Excellence in Film Music	Park City Film Music Festival	The End of All Things
2009	Director's Choice Award, Best Documentary Underscore	Park City Film Music Festival	The Constant Process
2008	Gold Medal for Outstanding Achievement in Film Music	Park City Film Music Festival	Entity: Nine, Shelter, Rocketboy, Freedomland, Beyond the Silence
2008	Gold Medal for Musical Excellence	Park City Film Music Festival	Entity: Nine
2008	Gold Medal for Musical Excellence	Park City Film Music Festival	Shelter
2008	Gold Medal for Musical Excellence	Park City Film Music Festival	Rocketboy
2008	Gold Medal for Musical Excellence	Park City Film Music Festival	Freedomland
2008	Gold Medal for Musical Excellence	Park City Film Music Festival	Beyond the Silence
2007	Best Use of Film Score Award	Film & TV Music Awards	Rocketboy
2005	Annie Award, Outstanding Achievement in Music for an Animated Television Program	Annie Awards	Duck Dodgers episode "Invictus Interruptus" (award shared by Robert J. Kral, Douglas Romayne, Zoran Boris)
2000	BMI Outstanding Achievement in Film Scoring Award	BMI Film & TV Music Awards(registration required)	Fishing & Religion; University of Southern California

== Credits ==
=== Television ===
- Buffy the Vampire Slayer (20th Century Fox/Mutant Enemy) — composer, episodes 7.01 "Lessons" and 7.03 "Same Time, Same Place"
- Angel (20th Century Fox/Mutant Enemy) — composer: additional music, episodes 4.08–4.21, 5.01–5.04, 5.06–5.11, and 5.13–5.21
- Miracles (Touchstone TV/Greenwalt) — composer: additional music, episodes 1.02–1.13
- Day Break (Touchstone TV) — composer: additional music, episodes 1.02–1.04
- Duck Dodgers (Warner Bros Animation) — composer: additional music, episodes 1.02–1.06, 1.09–1.13, 2.01–2.13, 3.01–3.11, 3.13; Annie Award, Outstanding Music For An Animated Television Show
- Wolf Girl, also known as Blood Moon (USA Network) — composer: additional music

=== Film ===
- The Skulls III (Universal Home/Newmarket Group/Original Film) — composer: additional music
- The Skulls II (Universal/Original Films) — composer: additional music
- Stealing Harvard (Revolution Studios/Imagine/Columbia Pictures/Sony Pictures) — composer: source music; orchestrator; conductor
- Interstate 60: Episodes of the Road (Fireworks Entertainment/Seven Arts/Firecorp Xi/Samuel Goldwyn Films/Screen Media) — composer: source music; orchestrator
- Big Fat Liar (Tollin/Robbins, Universal Pictures) — composer: source music; orchestrator
- Patching Cabbage (SignalhFilms) — composer
- Rocketboy — composer
- The Truth About Faces — composer
