= Illyria (Angel) =

Fictional character from the television series Angel

- Angel character
- Amy Acker as Illyria
- First appearance: "A Hole in the World" (2004)
- Last appearance: "Not Fade Away" (2004)
- Created by: Joss Whedon
- Portrayed by: Amy Acker

In-universe information
- Affiliation: Angel Investigations
- Classification: Old One (demon)
- Notable powers: Superhuman strength, agility, reflexes, stamina, fighting skills, invulnerability, and other acute senses Time manipulation and interdimensional travel

Illyria is a fictional recurring character created by Joss Whedon for the television series Angel, portrayed by Amy Acker. She is credited as a main character in the last third of season 5.

== Plot summary ==
The character is introduced in a story where the main character, Fred Burkle, dies of a mysterious infection, after which her dead body becomes the host of an ancient demon, Illyria, who once ruled the world but now finds she has outlived her kingdom. Subsequent episodes featuring Illyria document her struggle with adapting to the human condition, Fred's memories, and the continuing grief of Fred's friends and loved ones, who make up the central cast of the show.

"Illyria raises significant questions about how essence and existence are related. This is central to understanding existentialism. Whedon raises many challenges to existentialism through Illyria's journey—from the point when she pops into existence at Fred's death, to when she 'performs Fred' as Wesley dies."

Though the character only appeared in the final episodes of Angel's final season, Illyria appears heavily in various official and unofficial comic book continuations of the show, including licensed fictional crossover stories where Illyria is the only character from the Buffy the Vampire Slayer television franchise to appear. The character has also been subject to analysis from academics, several of whom frame the story of Fred's death using feminist film theory.

== Character history ==
=== Background ===
Illyria is one of the legendary Old Ones, original pure demons from the Primordium Age, who ruled territory that included modern-day California. She ruled from her citadel, Vahla ha'nesh, which corresponds to modern-day Los Angeles. Illyria was eventually defeated and murdered.

Illyria in her true form, standing before her demon army.

Illyria had high status among the Old Ones, such that she still had followers and acolytes in the modern day. When the Old Ones became extinct, Illyria's essence was placed in a stone sarcophagus, which was kept in a mystical graveyard known as The Deeper Well along with the coffins of other Old Ones. A warrior of good was assigned to guard the Deeper Well to prevent anyone from extracting the coffins, as Old Ones are capable of resurrection. In the 20th century, the Keeper of the Deeper Well was Drogyn the Battlebrand.

Before falling, Illyria planned her resurrection. She hid her temple in a different time plane, rendering it untouchable, until she could return to open the gateway. Illyria's army was placed there as well. In the intervening centuries, the army was destroyed.

=== Resurrection ===
As pre-ordained, Illyria's sarcophagus is teleported to the general area of Los Angeles, but due to continental shifting, it ends up outside the United States of America. Somehow, it is delivered to American soil, but is held up in Customs on its way to Wolfram & Hart. Dr. Sparrow manipulates Charles Gunn into releasing the sarcophagus. Knox, Illyria's self-fashioned high priest and the mastermind behind her resurrection, has the sarcophagus delivered to Fred Burkle at Wolfram & Hart's science lab. Curiosity draws Fred to the sarcophagus, and upon touching one of the embedded crystals, Illyria's essence is released into her body. Illyria's spirit acts as an infection, liquifying Fred's organs, hardening her skin, and allegedly consuming her soul. After hours of agony, and despite Angel and Spike's efforts, Fred's body is completely taken over by Illyria, who also absorbs her memories.

With the aid of Knox, Illyria attempts to bring about the destruction of humankind by resurrecting her ancient army. Despite the best efforts of Angel, Spike, and Wesley Wyndam-Pryce, she fights off all three and opens the portal to her army, only to discover it long since destroyed. Lost and without purpose, Illyria agrees to adjust to the modern world with Wesley's help.

When Wesley mentions to her Gunn is trapped in a Wolfram & Hart-imposed pseudo-Hell, Illyria opens a portal and rescues Gunn without hesitation, later noting the debt the group owes to her. In the process, she destroys eleven torture units, two troop carriers, an ice cream truck, eight "beautifully maintained" lawns, and "rendered useless" dozens of Wolfram & Hart employees, according to Marcus Hamilton. At this point, her pastimes include talking to plants and training with Spike. Although she criticizes Spike's adaptability, declaring adaptation to be a compromise, Illyria enjoys their sparring; at one point, she expresses her desire to keep him as a pet, a strange but true sign of affection.

Eventually, Illyria's power becomes extremely unstable, and she is being thrown out of the linear progression of time, as her power seeks to escape its shell. She kills Spike, Wesley, Lorne, and Angel in confusion, but another time jump sees her drag Angel with her, who sees she will soon detonate, causing enough destruction to wipe out the continent. Angel, with foreknowledge of her outbursts, calms Illyria down, and Wesley uses a device to extract a large portion of her power, effectively ending the threat.

As a result of this intervention, Illyria is stripped of much of her strength, as well as her abilities to alter time and talk to plants. She grows bitter and withdrawn. Her primary emotional connection is with Wesley, who continues to help her adjust to the world. After recognizing Wesley's feelings for Fred, Illyria wishes to explore her relationship with Wesley in a more sexual or romantic direction; he rejects any possibility of accepting her in Fred's form. She also develops a connection with Spike, who treats her with acceptance and dignity.

Illyria is brutally beaten and humiliated by Hamilton, which fuels the Old One's rage and motivates her to join the final battle against the Senior Partners. In the Angel series finale, "Not Fade Away," Illyria, Spike, Wesley, Gunn, Lorne, Lindsey, and Angel fight separate groups of demons from the Circle of the Black Thorn. After killing her targets, Illyria seeks out Wesley and finds him dying. Perceiving his imminent death, she comforts Wesley in Fred's form. Filled with unexpected and uncontrollable grief, Illyria violently dispatches his killer, Cyvus Vail, shattering his head with a single punch, before meeting the others and declaring a strong desire to "do more violence." The Senior Partners send their army against the surviving members of Angel's team; Illyria joins Angel, Gunn, and Spike in the final battle.

Interviews have revealed that had there been a sixth season of Angel, Illyria would have used Fred's appearance more often. This would have led to an identity crisis, according to Joss Whedon.

In the canonical comic Angel: After the Fall, it is confirmed Illyria survived the final battle against the Senior Partners.

=== Literature ===
Illyria appears substantially in the comic books published by IDW Publishing following Angel's series finale. Several titles featuring Illyria have nothing or very little to do with the larger Buffy and Angel franchise. Until the advent of the canonical comics of 2007, most Illyria stories were set during season 5 of Angel. The comic book Illyria: Spotlight (2006) by Peter David depicts Illyria's encounters with Fred's friends and family, and she begins to cry when she watches home movies of Fred's life; she later asserts to Wesley that she feels no regret. Peter David also published an Illyria crossover with his own comic book, Fallen Angel. In volume one of Fallen Angel Reborn (2009), set in season 5, Illyria is transported to the dimension of Bete Noire where she attempts to reclaim her lost power; flashbacks depict her battle with the Wolf, the Ram and the Hart as well as other Old Ones; in the present day, she faces the series' heroine Liandra. Illyria appears on the cover of each issue. In the miniseries Spike: Shadow Puppets, she appears in flashbacks and as puppet in the narrative of that story, a sequel to season 5 episode "Smile Time".

In canonical comics, she first appears in the second issue of Angel: After the Fall, the official Angel continuation. The spin-off miniseries Spike: After the Fall charts Illyria's journey between "Not Fade Away" and Angel: After the Fall. All After the Fall stories are written by Brian Lynch, who receives substantial input from creator Joss Whedon. In Angel: After the Fall, Los Angeles has been sent to hell by Wolfram & Hart. Illyria is established as the Demon Lord of Beverly Hills, and working with Spike saves innocents by placing them in Connor's care. Spike: After the Fall details their acquisition of Lord status. Throughout the series, Illyria features temporary reversions to her Fred state as the hell dimension causes her powers to go out of control. Later, when Gunn (now a vampire) kills the last of her memories of Fred, these stop, and she reverts to her primordial form and begins savaging Los Angeles. Telepathic fish Betta George is able to fill her with Spike and Wesley's memories of Fred, and Fred's humanity causes her to stop. Though Wolfram and Hart reverts time to before they destroyed Los Angeles, Illyria retains the memories of her experiences like everyone else. Illyria guards a hospitalized Gunn — human once more — in his hospital bed from angry demons, and her new memories of Fred make her crisis of humanity even more apparent. The two depart Los Angeles and encounter an Old One from her past. In IDW's ongoing Angel series, Illyria attempts to seduce Connor as part of her mating cycle. She fails due to Connor's reluctance. At one point she makes clear to Angel that while she's not and never will be Fred, like him, she's a formerly evil being trying to redeem their past sins.

In the comic Illyria: Haunted (2011), Illyria begins having nightmares consisting of Fred's memories. She reaches out to an emotionally unavailable Angel and finds no comfort. Illyria then seeks out Spike for advice. He believes she should return to the Deeper Well for answers and comfort. She then, in an unprecedented show of humility, formally asks Spike for help. Spike takes Illyria to Sally, a Frellian demon who grants favors for a price. She sends them to retrieve a charm from a potential suitor of hers, and then opens a portal for Illyria to the Deeper Well. Illyria quickly dispatches the Vastari demons guarding the entrance and enters to find the new guardian is a rare matriarchal demon. The new guardian sends two Yastigilian Hounds to attack Illyria, unaware that Illyria has the knowledge to control them. Illyria explains that they are kindred species. She is granted access to the Deeper Well but is warned not to touch anything. Illyria finds nothing but Gylphs on the wall where her coffin once was and begins smashing things in disappointment. Drawn to a gem on the wall, she touches it and is magically enlightened to her new place in the world, unaware that she has accidentally released a former rival old one, Arsgomor. Illyria attempts to both fight and reason with Arsgomor until he kills one of her new Yastigilian pets. Illyria commands the local plant life to subdue Arsgomor and then degenerates him to a fetal form. She releases this new baby Arsgomor to the new guardian and returns to L.A. with her pet Yastigilian hound, Pancakes. She then uses her restored powers to open a dimensional portal and go traveling.

Subsequent to the above story, the rights to Angel characters were transferred from IDW to Dark Horse Comics, which publishes Buffy. In Angel and Faith (2012), Gunn tells Angel that Illyria is missing but presumed to be safe. She later debuts in Buffy in issue sixteen, as part of the "Welcome to the Team" story arc. Mid-battle, Buffy finds herself teleported to Los Angeles, where Illyria introduces herself as part of a council which needs Buffy's help due to the consequences of Buffy destroying the seed and stripping the universe of its ambient magic. In a confrontation with the season's villain, Severin, Illyria is stripped of her powers—including her ability to time travel—leaving her mortal and stuck in Fred's physical appearance. She assists Buffy's quest into its final arc, travelling into the Deeper Well alongside Buffy, Willow and Xander. Drawing on her personal experiences in Angel, she convinces Severin—whose powers threaten to rip a hole in time itself—to create a new seed, which will restore magic to the universe. Willow points out to Illyria that she is showing very human compassion, which Illyria herself recognizes. The creation of the new seed creates a powerful discharge, vaporizing Illyria and Severin both. In the follow-up series Buffy the Vampire Slayer Season Ten, Buffy expresses regret for Illyria's death to the demon Eldre Koh. Koh is surprised by this, and tells Buffy that she does not understand Old Ones, suggesting Illyria may yet survive in some form. Later, in the Angel & Faith book, Angel encounters Fred walking the streets of London. They surmise the recreated Seed attempted to bring Illyria back, and in the event, also brought back Fred. Now both Fred and Illyria are alive and cohabit Fred's body.

== Powers and abilities ==
The full scope of Illyria's power is unknown, and probably unlimited. When Illyria takes over her new "shell," she possesses tremendous physical strength, far superior to that of most vampires, demons, or Slayers. Spike likens a blow from Illyria to being hit by a Mack Truck. Her strength, reflexes, and agility make her a formidable hand-to-hand combatant. Illyria uses an ancient fighting style that Spike compares to Tae Kwon Do and (fictional) Brazilian Ninjitsu. Although Spike's adaptability gives him an occasional advantage, Illyria dominates their sparring sessions. Her skin is a hardened shell, providing her body with a heavy armor capable of withstanding blows from forged weapons, such as swords or axes. In the episode "Time Bomb", she managed to single-handedly kill Spike, Wesley, Lorne and Angel in a matter of seconds, a testament of her prowess in combat.

Illyria is aided in combat by her ability to selectively alter time, which allows her to easily dodge both attacks and bullets; she can accomplish a goal and leave an area before her opponent even realizes she has moved. She has only been shown altering the flow of time to produce a slow motion effect, though it is possible that she can alter time in other ways. She can also open interdimensional portals. In the episode "Underneath," Wesley Wyndam-Pryce comments on her not needing to sleep.

Illyria can alter her physical appearance on a basic level, and she is capable of recreating Fred's persona accurately enough to fool Fred's parents. She tells Wesley that she can take any form she chooses. Illyria has empathic abilities that allow her to perceive the emotional states of others. She was, for instance, capable of sensing Connor's lust for her and Wesley's frustration with Angel, as well as his grief over Fred's death. Illyria communicates with flora, often spending hours at a time communing with a plant. She is also capable of distinguishing humans (or "primitives") from demons, vampires, and other non-human life forms.

Illyria retains the insights from her experiences as an Old One, which enable her to effectively analyze the power dynamics, personal motivations, and emotions that influence those around her. She is stronger than Spike and Angel combined (having proven at one point to be able to engage both in battle simultaneously and come out victorious).

In her/its natural form, Illyria is a massive genderless cephalopod-like monster, similar to Lovecraft's Cthulhu, with inhuman size and numerous tentacles, with all of her powers at full capacity.

=== Powers diminished ===
After being drained by the Mutari generator, Illyria's abilities are significantly diminished. Her physical strength is decreased (although retaining a high level of strength, well above that of Slayers, vampires and the vast majority of demons shown in the series), and she no longer has the ability to open portals or commune with plants. Wesley perceives that Illyria is no longer invulnerable, as she once was (cf. "The Girl in Question") and she is later beaten unconscious by Marcus Hamilton in "Power Play". In addition to this, she successfully kills several members of the Circle of the Black Thorn with minimal difficulty. She retains her ability to morph her physical appearance, and also her ability to differentiate between humans and non-humans.

In the series Angel: After the Fall, Illyria's powers behave erratically and are closer to their full potential. Early in the series, she was shown to hold herself unarmed against a grown dragon at full strength, enduring a blast of fire from its mouth and being swallowed by it without visibly losing her taste for the fight – all this while sporting a stab wound to the torso from Angel which seemed to only offend and irritate as opposed to hurt her. Her ability to alter time, while removed by the Mutari generator, seems to have at least partially returned as a result of the aftermath of L.A.'s relocation to hell. To what extent this ability can now be used has yet to be seen; during her fight with Angel, he reverted briefly to his former human self (Liam), his puppet self ("Smile Time") and a baby due to her manipulation of time, but the erratic nature of these shifts seems to indicate that she lacks any real control of her powers. Later in the series, it transpires that the only thing keeping her from her true primordial form in After the Fall are the remnants of Fred's personality; when Gunn 'kills' the Fred persona, her true Old One form is unleashed.

Following After the Fall, after the Senior Partners reversed time so that the fall never occurred, Illyria was returned to her former late-season 5 levels. In the comic book Angel: Only Human, when facing her old enemy Baticus (who had been empowered with the energy drained from Illyria by the Mutari generator) Illyria again regained some of her former power, being able to teleport and freeze time. However, when she left the scene, she lost these powers. Following this, Illyria is depicted as more compassionate in this weakened form, but must sleep at least 20 minutes for every ninety-four-hour period of activity. Subsequent to this, she appears in Buffy the Vampire Slayer Season Nine (with blue-and-black hair) and comments on her full powers having been restored. She later loses her abilities in the same arc, and appears physically identical to Fred Burkle once again, albeit dressed in her standard leather costume.

=== Powers restored ===
Later, in her own IDW miniseries (Illyria: Haunted), Illyria visits the Deeper Well and finds a blue gem embedded in a wall of art depicting her true form that causes her to undergo a transformation; her hair is now completely blue, as are her eyes (as opposed to merely her irises), and all her powers are seemingly restored to her. She can once again communicate with and control plant life. Her power is enough to face Arsgomor, another Old One, in her human form and defeat him in battle, going so far as to regress it to an unhatched egg-like form and to effortlessly open doors in space and time.

== Relationships ==
- Spike – After her resurrection, Illyria shares an emerging bond with Spike. Each is on a path from demon to hero, and they share a love of violence. Their sparring sessions are mutually satisfactory; Spike hones his fighting techniques, and Illyria is able to regularly inflict pain and dominate Spike in combat. She, at one point, expresses a desire to keep Spike as a pet. After Illyria's powers are diminished, Spike helps her regain confidence and venture into the world again. Their relationship remains non-romantic, but develops into mutual respect. In After the Fall, Illyria apparently considers Spike a pet and comes to his defense when Angel attacks him.
- Wesley Wyndam-Pryce – Though their "relationship" is not a true romantic one, the undertones of attraction being based mostly on Fred and Wesley's relationship, Wesley wanted to be around the one part of his deceased love and Illyria was influenced by Fred's memories. When Wesley dies at the hands of Cyvus Vail, Illyria takes revenge on Cyvus by putting her fist through his skull, killing him instantly. Afterward, Illyria is the one who informs the team about Wesley's death and says that she feels grief and wishes "to do more violence" in the series finale's final battle. In After the Fall issue #9, Illyria takes ownership of Wesley's corpse, repeating "You're staying with me."
- Charles Gunn – Possibly due to Illyria's memories of Fred she rescues Gunn from Wolfram and Hart's holding dimension and also tells him to not die in the finale, as he is "not unpleasant" to her eyes.

== Appearances ==
Angel (2004)
Illyria was a regular towards the end of the Angel's fifth season in 2004, first appearing in "A Hole in the World," replacing Fred. Technically, since she is played by the same actress as Fred, it could be said that she was credited as a regular from her first appearance, but the first instance of the opening sequence showing Amy Acker specifically as Illyria and not Fred is in "Underneath". Illyria appears in 8 episodes in total.

Illyria has also appeared in Angel expanded universe material such as comics, most notably her own one-shot comic Illyria: Spotlight in 2006.

Angel: After the Fall (2007–2011)
Central to the "Angel the Fall" storyline, Illyria has appeared in all but the first issue and the First Night stories of issues #7-8. She also appears in all four issues of the spin-off comic book series Spike: After the Fall, as well as Angel: Only Human with Gunn and her own miniseries, Illyria: Haunted. She also briefly appears in the first issue of Spike's miniseries.

Fallen Angel (2009)
Illyria appears in the four part comic book series of Peter David's Fallen Angel Reborn in 2009. According to PAD, "The story is set early in Illyria's involvement with Angel & Co. Having been deprived of her power by Wesley, she is drawn to [the town of] Bete Noire as a potential source for not only becoming what she was before, but even achieving her previous status. Remember, what we see of her in Angel is not her true appearance."

"Buffy the Vampire Slayer Season Nine" (2012–2013)
Illyria debuts in issue 16, "Welcome to the Team, Part One."

"Buffy the Vampire Slayer Season Ten" (2014–2016)
In Angel & Faith issue #10 Fred's soul was restored with The Return of The Magic. And Illyria was restored in Fred's vessel too. In the next issues, Illyria tries to take control of the vessel for revenge of her hominid times.

== See also ==
- Women warriors in literature and culture
- List of women warriors in folklore
