= The Girl in Question =

- Angel episode
- Episode no.: Season 5 Episode 20
- Directed by: David Greenwalt
- Written by: Steven S. DeKnight; Drew Goddard
- Production code: 5ADH20
- Original air date: May 5, 2004

Guest appearances
- Julie Benz as Darla; Tom Lenk as Andrew Wells; Juliet Landau as Drusilla; David Lee as Alfonso; Gary Grubbs as Roger Burkle; Jennifer Griffin as Trish Burkle; Carole Raphaelle Davis as Ilona Costa Bianchi; Vikki Gurdas as Bartendress; Rob Steiner as Pietro; Andrew Ableson as Italian Man; Dominic Pace as Bouncer; Irina Maleeva as Old Demon Lady

Episode chronology
← Previous "Time Bomb"	Next → "Power Play"
- Angel season 5

"The Girl in Question" is the 20th episode of the fifth season of the American television series Angel. Written by Steven S. DeKnight and Drew Goddard and directed by David Greenwalt, it was originally broadcast on May 5, 2004 on the WB network. When Angel and Spike go to Italy after hearing Buffy is in trouble, they discover she is dating their long-time nemesis The Immortal. While searching for Buffy - and the head of a demon which must be brought back to L.A. to prevent a demon war - they reminisce about their history with The Immortal and finally accept that they cannot control whom Buffy dates.

== Plot ==
Gunn discovers a demon gang war is imminent unless the dead leader's head is recovered from Rome, so Angel and Spike travel to Rome to retrieve the head. They find out that Buffy is dating their nemesis "The Immortal". Flashbacks are shown that explain why Angel and Spike hate "The Immortal": he slept with Darla and Drusilla simultaneously while his minions held Angelus and Spike in chains. They discuss the matter and conclude that Buffy must be under some sort of love spell. Spike and Angel visit Buffy's apartment and find Andrew Wells, who is living with Buffy and Dawn. He says that Buffy went to a club with The Immortal. They go to the club and see Buffy from a distance. They get distracted and leave the demon head in a bag on a table, which is snatched by The Immortal's demon butler. Angel and Spike fight the minions and "accidentally" hit each other a few times, too. The demon butler gets away with the head and leaves.

After arguing over how they would be able to find the head "if they had their resources", Angel and Spike go the Rome Wolfram & Hart offices, where they are greeted by the CEO, an ebullient Italian woman. She says the head is being held in a standard ransom situation. Angel and Spike are given money for the drop, which they exchange with the butler for the bag. They open it and in it is actually a bomb, three seconds from detonation. The two both barely survive the ensuing explosion, albeit with their clothing heavily damaged and the street destroyed. The Rome Wolfram & Hart CEO explains that they always use the bomb on first-timers as a prank, and replaces their damaged clothing, including Spike's "irreplaceable" jacket. After being locked out of her office, Spike and Angel return to Buffy's apartment where Andrew tells them to let Buffy move on, saying that although she loves them both, they need to give her some space and move on themselves or they could never again have any chance to reunite with her. Frustrated by their inability to contact Buffy and by the demon butler's chicanery on The Immortal's behalf, Angel and Spike return to LA, where they find the head on Angel's desk with a note signed by The Immortal. Though outraged that he "distracted" them again while he put the moves on "their" girl, Angel and Spike realize that they do need to move on.

Meanwhile, at Wolfram & Hart in L.A., Fred's parents show up at Wesley's office where he tries to tell them she has been consumed, only to be interrupted by Illyria who looks and acts exactly like Fred. Later, while her parents are being shown Fred's office, Wesley confronts Illyria. She explains because of Fred's past memories she cannot bear to witness their grief in addition to Wesley's, which she experiences as a physical pain. She explains that she can appear in the form that she wishes. After Fred's parents leave, Illyria continues to appear and speak as Fred, which angers Wesley. She states that she wishes to explore the relationship further and does not understand why Wesley is angry when he obviously loved Fred. He replies that she is not Fred and that he is sickened by the sight of her, and orders her to never assume Fred's form again. As she changes back into her usual form, she appears somewhat confused and upset when he leaves the room.

== Production details ==
This episode was the first time James Marsters met director David Greenwalt, despite working on the second season of Buffy together. "I was just a guest star, and I had no reason to go up to the writers' offices. I didn't go to the gods at that point," says Marsters. He says that Greenwalt is "exceptional" at inspiring actors to perform their best.

Actress Julie Benz says her last appearance as Darla in the flashback scenes of this episode was "a great way for us to... say goodbye to our characters, to be together and to have some fun." She was relieved to shoot such a "playful" scene, "because anything else I think would have been too hard; too difficult; too painful." She adds the sheet she was wrapped in kept snagging on the camera dolly and falling down. "It was a great way to end; flashing everybody!" she says.

Dawn Summers was intended to appear in this episode, but as Michelle Trachtenberg was unavailable for filming, the role of Dawn was rewritten for Andrew Wells.

=== Writing ===
It is a commonly held but mistaken belief that the producers sought Sarah Michelle Gellar for this episode. Another actress played Buffy Summers in a faraway shot of her dancing with The Immortal in a nightclub. In fact, the intention of this episode was always that neither Buffy nor the Immortal would be clearly seen. Gellar was actually sought for the penultimate episode "Power Play", but proved unavailable because she was busy finishing the filming of The Grudge. Writer David Fury explains this in an interview with Mike Jozic:

JOZIC: But wasn't there talk of [Sarah Michelle Gellar] being in "The Girl in Question"?

FURY: There was very, very little talk about that. No, she was never going to be in that. The missed opportunity to see Buffy was always going to be the joke of that. It's the tease of, they're going to see Buffy, and they can't quite get to her. It's sort of the After Hours kind of craziness where it's like, I can't get to her, I can't see her, and that was always pretty much decided.

The person we expected to get and didn't get was Michelle Trachtenberg. We had expected to get her for that episode but she was tied up prepping a movie, I believe, and wasn't able to do it, which is why we brought Andrew back again.

But, Sarah? No. We never expected Sarah to be in that episode. We did think she might be in the second last episode, "Power Play", just like Angel appeared in the second last episode of Buffy's finale. We thought we'd do that but wound up not.

David Greenwalt refers to this episode as "Rosencrantz and Guildenstern go to Rome."
