= A Hole in the World =

- Angel episode
- Episode no.: Season 5 Episode 15
- Directed by: Joss Whedon
- Written by: Joss Whedon
- Production code: 5ADH15
- Original air date: February 25, 2004

Guest appearances
- Sarah Thompson as Eve; Jonathan M. Woodward as Knox; Jennifer Griffin as Trish Burkle; Gary Grubbs as Roger Burkle; Alec Newman as Drogyn; John Duff as Delivery Man; Jeremy Glazer as Lawyer

Episode chronology
| ← Previous "Smile Time" | Next → "Shells" |
- Angel season 5

"A Hole in the World" is the 15th episode of the fifth season of the American television series Angel. Written and directed by series creator Joss Whedon, it was originally broadcast on February 25, 2004 on the WB television network. In this episode, Fred is infected by the spirit of Illyria, an ancient demon who existed before recorded time. The entire crew searches for a cure, but give up hope when Spike and Angel discover that the only way to save Fred's life would kill thousands of people. Wesley comforts Fred as she dies and witnesses the emergence of Illyria.

== Plot ==
In a flashback to Texas, Fred's parents are helping her pack for her move to Los Angeles. As she packs her stuffed bunny Feigenbaum, Fred promises her worried parents that she will live a boring life. In the present day, at Wolfram & Hart's science lab, Knox accepts the delivery of a sarcophagus. When Fred touches the lid, a puff of dusty air is released, making her cough. Later, she meets Wesley downstairs and they kiss, thrilled to finally be dating. Lorne starts singing "You Are My Sunshine" to Fred, who picks up the song. Lorne immediately realizes that something is wrong. Fred suddenly coughs up blood and collapses.

When Fred regains consciousness in the medical wing, her friends assure her that she will be okay, even though they do not know what is wrong with her. Gunn goes to the White Room where he meets the conduit. Gunn wants to make a deal for Fred's life and offers to give up his own but the conduit tells him that the Senior Partners already own Gunn's life.

Angel, Spike, and Lorne go to Lindsey's apartment, where they encounter Eve, who denies knowing anything about what is happening to Fred. Eve sings "L.A. Song" and Lorne determines that she is not involved. Eve suggests they look through the oldest scrolls for information on the Deeper Well. In Wesley's office, he tells the group that the demon in question is called Illyria and she is coming back to life by hollowing Fred out. Angel and Spike travel to England where the Deeper Well is guarded.

Wesley takes Fred home so she can rest. In her apartment, Fred asks for Feigenbaum, but cries when she cannot remember who he is. Wesley reads A Little Princess to comfort her as she deteriorates. Angel and Spike arrive in the Cotswolds and meet Drogyn, the keeper of the Deeper Well. As they head into the Deeper Well, Angel explains to Spike that Drogyn cannot lie.

Gunn and Knox discuss trying to cryogenically preserve Fred. Knox makes a slip of the tongue which Gunn catches, causing Knox to admit he is one of Illyria's acolytes. He tells Gunn that everything was planned millions of years ago and it cannot be stopped. He also reveals that Gunn contributed by unknowingly getting the sarcophagus through US customs by signing the contract to make his law knowledge permanent after finding out it was temporary.

Drogyn leads Angel and Spike into the Deeper Well, explaining that Illyria's sarcophagus disappeared a month before as it was predestined to do but the demon's essence can be drawn back to the well by a champion. However, if Illyria leaves Fred now, she would kill every person between Fred's body in L.A. and the Deeper Well. Angel realizes that he cannot allow that many people to die, even to save Fred.

As Wesley weeps and holds Fred's body in his arms, she begins to convulse, throwing them both to the floor. Fred rises from the floor as Ilyria.

== Acting ==
Sarah Thompson sings "LA Song", which was written by series co-creator David Greenwalt and Christian Kane for Lindsey McDonald to perform on-stage in the Angel episode "Dead End". Thompson, who grew up doing musical theater, had begged Joss Whedon to allow her character to sing.

== Production details ==
Joss Whedon admits he became emotional during the scene in which Fred dies: "I cried man tears when I wrote it, and when I filmed it and when I edited it...it's one of the most beautiful things I've ever filmed." Amy Acker agrees, saying, "We kept crying while we were just reading the script; saying, 'We're not going to have any tears left!' Of course that didn't really hold true..." The final death scene was challenging for Alexis Denisof as well, who says, "There's a sort of tightening that happens with each scene where you feel it just getting worse and worse and I remember when we were shooting it that that was what kept choking me up. The situation of losing Fred was becoming more and more real and closer."

The scene where Gunn is fighting himself in the White Room was done by filming J. August Richards twice in two shots, as he switched between good and evil Gunn. Richards says of the experience, "It was one of the most fun things I've ever done on the show."

After filming the scene where Fred dies, Whedon, Acker, and Denisof "went out for drinks and ended up just sitting around quietly, exhausted from the day's events". Whedon would later use this moment as inspiration for the post-credits scene in The Avengers in which the Avengers silently eat in a shawarma restaurant after the film's climactic battle.

=== Writing ===
Whedon and the other writers decided to kill the character of Fred so that Amy Acker could "play somebody new, somebody who's regal and scary and different than anything she's gotten to do on the show. The best way to do that of course is to kill her and have her become somebody else." The character Drogyn – who is established as someone who cannot lie – was introduced so that when he says Fred cannot be saved, the audience believes it, explains Whedon.

== Reception and reviews ==
This episode was rated as one of the series' top five episodes in a poll done by Angel Magazine.
