= Not Fade Away (Angel) =

- Angel episode
- Episode no.: Season 5 Episode 22
- Directed by: Jeffrey Bell
- Written by: Joss Whedon; Jeffrey Bell
- Production code: 5ADH22
- Original air date: May 19, 2004

Guest appearances
- Vincent Kartheiser as Connor; Christian Kane as Lindsey McDonald; Dennis Christopher as Cyvus Vail; Sarah Thompson as Eve; Julia Lee as Anne Steele; Leland Crooke as Archduke Sebassis; Stacey Travis as Senator Helen Brucker; Adam Baldwin as Marcus Hamilton; Ryan Alvarez as Pee Pee Demon; David Figlioli as Bartender; Mark Colson as Izzy

Episode chronology
← Previous "Power Play"	Next → "Angel: After the Fall"
- Angel season 5

"Not Fade Away" is the 22nd and final episode of the fifth season and the series finale of the American television series Angel. Written by series creator Joss Whedon and directed and co-written by Jeffrey Bell, it was originally broadcast on May 19, 2004 on the WB network. In "Not Fade Away", Angel convinces his team that they must take out every member of the Circle of the Black Thorn in a defiant and probably futile stand against the Senior Partners of Wolfram & Hart. He tells his team to make the most of what may be their last day on Earth: Gunn visits his old neighborhood; Wesley tends to the wounded Illyria; Lorne spends some time onstage; Spike performs poetry at an open mic, and Angel visits his son. When night falls, the team divides and sets out to eliminate the members of the Black Thorn, incurring the wrath of the armies of hell.

== Plot ==
Angel briefs his team on his plan to kill all the members of the Circle of the Black Thorn. Marcus Hamilton calls Angel to an emergency meeting of the circle, where the other members express doubts about Angel's loyalties. Angel proves himself to them by irrevocably renouncing his role in the Shanshu Prophecy, thereby giving up his chance to become human. Back at Wolfram & Hart, Angel meets with his old enemy Lindsey McDonald and enlists him in the planned attack on the Circle. He then tells the rest of his group that the plan will proceed that night. Lorne has serious reservations about Angel's plan, and his mood is dark and somber.

Angel advises his friends to spend the rest of the day as if it were their last, surmising that they will most likely not survive that night. Angel visits his son, Connor, who reveals that he knows that Angel is his father; his old memories are now "mixed in" with his new ones, and he understands and appreciates why Angel gave him new memories. Lindsey spends the day with Eve, who is suspicious of Angel even though Lindsey now trusts him. Gunn spends his day helping Anne at the homeless shelter that she maintains. Spike goes to a seedy bar, where he drinks heavily and recites poetry onstage. Wesley spends his day in his apartment tending to Illyria's wounds, telling her there is nothing else he wants and nowhere for him to be. When Illyria asks why he will not let her comfort him in Fred's form, Wesley admits that even though he loves and misses Fred, he must face the harsh reality of Fred's death in order to survive.

The team splits up to attack members of the Circle separately, making plans to reunite if they survive their missions. As they leave, Lorne tells Angel that this is the last thing he will do for him as he is leaving for good. Gunn, Spike, and Illyria kill their targets; Lindsey and Lorne wipe out the Sahvrin clan. Then, on Angel's order, Lorne executes Lindsey and then leaves, traumatized by his ordeal. Wesley is killed as he knocks out Cyrus Vail; as he dies, a devastated Illyria comforts him in Fred's guise, then kills Vail when he regains consciousness.

Hamilton, warned of the plan by Harmony, confronts Angel – intent on stopping his plan to kill the Circle's leader. Angel reveals that he anticipated Harmony's betrayal and has already poisoned Archduke Sebassis. The two begin their struggle; Angel is losing his fight with Hamilton until Connor arrives to join the fight. Hamilton proudly announces that the power of the Senior Partners courses through his veins, prompting Angel to assume vampiric form and drink his blood – acquiring enough of Hamilton's strength to defeat him. Expecting a swift counterattack from the Senior Partners as the building begins to collapse, Angel directs Connor to leave; then heads to rendezvous with his surviving allies.

An army of supernatural creatures descends on Angel, Spike, Illyria and a wounded Gunn. As the episode (and series) ends, the four prepare to battle and Angel declares, "Let's go to work."

== Production ==
=== Writing ===
Following the news that the series would not be renewed for an expected sixth season, Joss Whedon reworked the end of the season into a finale. He said of the episode: "This was not the final grace note after a symphony, the way the Buffy finale was. We are definitely still in the thick of it. But the point of the show is that you're never done; no matter who goes down, the fight goes on." One change made as a result of the cancellation was the death of Wesley, who Whedon would have otherwise kept alive, although he said the scene was "one of my favorite moments that we shot." Similarly, Alexis Denisof said his character's demise was "the perfect human death of a human life."

The abrupt ending of the episode was intended to show how the character of Angel is constantly fighting for redemption. Whedon commented: "People kept calling it a cliffhanger. I was like, 'Are you mad, sir? Don't you see that that is the final statement?'" Producer David Fury agreed that it was "the perfect way to end the series, and anybody who says otherwise is dumb", adding: "Any proper resolution of, 'Oh, we've defeated the demons, they've gone back to hell, let's get a beer,' just would have been absolutely wrong for that show." David Boreanaz also welcomed the decision to end mid-battle, saying he was "comfortable with the way they're ending it. It's very open-ended [and] goes out fighting." Commenting on the ending 20 years later, Whedon acknowledged some viewers would have preferred closure but defended the decision.

Speculation that Sarah Michelle Gellar would appear as Buffy in the episode was quashed by Whedon in an interview with TV Guide, saying he did not want the finale to "revolve around a guest star." He added that "I want to end the show with the people who've been in the trenches together, the characters who have lived - and occasionally died - together." However, Jeffrey Bell stated that Gellar had been intended to appear in the previous episode but was unavailable for filming. Although the actress was available to film for the finale, Bell said that "to force her into the very last episode to reread stuff that we already dealt with didn't make any sense."

=== Filming ===
Christian Kane could not be on set for the final episode, so all the Lindsey scenes in this episode were written and shot about a month in advance. Kane says that he was unhappy with the way his character ended the season, but mostly because the series ending came as a shock and "we’ve all just now gotten comfortable in our skin."

In the scene in which Mercedes McNab is in bed with Adam Baldwin's character, plastic inserts in her bra are clearly visible as she turns to the side. Jeffrey Bell jokes in the DVD commentary that she is "not a special effect," that she is quite real, despite the digitally added fake blood on her lip.

== Reception and reviews ==
At the time of its initial airing, the episode garnered mixed reactions from both critics and fans. It appeared on Zap2it's list of the worst series finales because "we never saw the end of the fight." E! News quoted another fan as saying, "Well, that was the best first half of a season finale ever...what happened to part two?" A different criticism came from essayist Roz Kaveney, who argued that this episode was a classic example of "'Superhero Exceptionalism', the idea that superheroes are exempt from normal considerations and entitled to ignore consequences." The characters' attempt at redemption via a "single gratuitous heroic act of defiance", Kaveney felt, was contrary to Angel's message that redemption was only earned "one day at a time, by slow increments".

Over time however, "Not Fade Away" has come to receive critical acclaim, and is now sometimes referred to as one of the best series finales of all time. The Futon Critic named it the 4th best television episode of 2004, saying, "The series finale was filled with tons of great "holy shit" moments - Illyria's reaction to Wesley's death alone should be required watching for everyone - but the closing moments cut right to the heart of what the show has always been about: the good fight (and the quest for redemption itself) is always a constant struggle." A Huffington Post article about series finales cites it as "one of the few dramas that ended in a way that felt emotionally, tonally and thematically appropriate." In IGN's full series review, they say it "stands as one of the best final episodes of any show ever", and an article on Indiewire also placed it on their list of the best series finales. The episode was also nominated for a 2005 Hugo Award in the category of "Best Dramatic Presentation: Short Form". Matt Roush of TV Guide praised the series finale, finding it "incredibly inspiring" that Angel continues to seek redemption despite signing away the reward promised by the Shanshu Prophecy. "The series retired with dignity, integrity — and, yes, soul", Roush writes.
