= Power Play (Angel) =

- Angel episode
- Episode no.: Season 5 Episode 21
- Directed by: James A. Contner
- Written by: David Fury
- Production code: 5ADH21
- Original air date: May 12, 2004

Guest appearances
- Christian Kane as Lindsey McDonald; Dennis Christopher as Cyvus Vail; Alec Newman as Drogyn; Jenny Mollen as Nina Ash; Leland Crooke as Archduke Sebassis; Stacey Travis as Senator Helen Brucker; Adam Baldwin as Marcus Hamilton; Mark Colson as Izzy; Elimu Nelson as Ernesto

Episode chronology
← Previous "The Girl in Question"	Next → "Not Fade Away"
- Angel season 5

"Power Play" is the 21st episode of the fifth season of the American television series Angel. The gang starts to have doubts about Angel's loyalties when he appears to have become very close with the Circle of the Black Thorn, an evil secret demon society. When Drogyn, the guardian of the Deeper Well, arrives from England claiming that Angel has sent assassins after him, the gang's fears that Angel has become corrupted by wealth and power seem to be validated, especially when the imprisoned Lindsey confirms his theory about the Circle of the Black Thorn wanting to have Angel join their evil group.

In the meanwhile, Angel continues dating Nina, but eventually tells her to leave town fearing for her life when his induction into the Black Thorn becomes a certainty.

At the end, when the gang confronts Angel in his office about his questionable actions, a fight breaks out. With Lorne as a shield, Angel has time to take out a magical gem, using it to grant them a few unobserved minutes to set the group straight about what he is really planning, without anyone else knowing. It turns out that Angel has set up this whole charade of turning evil in an effort to infiltrate the Circle of the Black Thorn and identify its members.

== Plot ==
In a dark room, a shackled man with a bag over his head is being beaten with sticks by several attackers. Angel helps the man to his feet, and takes the bag off the man's face. The man thanks Angel but then Angel vamps out and bites the man's neck.

Nineteen hours earlier, Angel and Nina are lying in bed together and Nina notices that Angel is concerned with something at work. Back at Wolfram & Hart, Illyria complains that no one fears her anymore and Wesley is ignoring her ever since she pretended to be Fred. Spike tells her that although she has lost much of her powers, looking like Fred is more powerful than anything else to those who loved her. Meanwhile, Hamilton introduces Angel and Gunn to Senator Brucker and her vampire aide, Ernesto. Ernesto asks for human blood and Angel agrees to make an exception, upsetting Gunn. Wesley informs Angel that a Boretz demon is loose and killing people. However, Angel shrugs it off and leaves. Spike offers to take on the demon for Wesley and invites Illyria to go hunting with him.

In Angel's office, Angel, Gunn, Ernesto, and the Senator are watching a political ad of her rival, Mike Conley. The Senator asks Wolfram & Hart to brainwash Conley into confessing to being a pedophile so he will lose. Gunn is furious at the Senator's request, but Angel agrees. In Wesley's office, Wesley is researching Boretz demons when a strange circular symbol with eight spurs appears in his book but then disappears. Meanwhile, Spike and Illyria are searching for the Boretz demon. Illyria tells Spike that Angel has become corrupted through power but he refuses to believe her. The Boretz appears, and fights Spike but Illyria ultimately kills it. An injured Drogyn also appears and warns Spike that Angel cannot be trusted.

Back at Wolfram & Hart, Wesley walks into Angel's office where he finds Angel talking with Hamilton, and they ask Wesley to come back later. Gunn, Lorne, and Wesley all agree that Angel is not acting like himself at all. Spike calls, and the three gather in Spike's apartment to listen to Drogyn's tale of being attacked by a Sathari demon, an assassin-for-hire, at the Deeper Well. After a long and vicious fight, Drogyn learned that Angel hired it to kill him. Drogyn speculates that Angel wanted to cover up his involvement in helping Illyria's sarcophagus escape from the Deeper Well and that Angel sacrificed Fred on purpose. Lorne and Gunn take the news angrily, but Spike reminds them that Drogyn cannot lie. Wesley shows all of them the mysterious symbol of a black circle with eight spurs on it and believes it to be a connection to Angel's behavior. Gunn, Lorne, Spike, and Wesley leave to confront Angel, while Illyria keeps watch over Drogyn.

At the office, Spike interrogates Angel about Drogyn's attack but Angel denies everything. Angel explains that he has lost his sense of morality, and he wants global power, through any means necessary. He then meets with Nina and gives her three plane tickets, urging her to leave him for her own safety. Hurt and confused, Nina agrees. At Spike's apartment, Hamilton breaks in the door and knocks out Drogyn and Illyria. Meanwhile, Gunn and Spike interrogate Lindsey about the symbol. He explains that the symbol represents a small, but powerful, secret society of the elite evil, called the Circle of the Black Thorn who are responsible for the apocalypse. Lindsey explains that Wolfram & Hart is run by the Black Thorn while the Senior Partners actually live on a different plane of existence. Angel's team realize that Angel is being corrupted by the Circle of the Black Thorn.

Back in the dark room from the beginning, Angel takes the bag off the man's face to reveal it is Drogyn. Angel drinks his blood and is then branded with the symbol for the Circle of the Black Thorn. The robed attackers reveal themselves and celebrate Angel's acceptance into the fold. The next day at Wolfram & Hart, Angel is attacked by Gunn, Lorne, Spike, and Wesley. Angel disarms everyone and pulls a crystal out of his jacket, which activates a glamour that conceals the room for six minutes. Angel reveals that everything that he has been doing — agreeing with their evil clients, sending Wesley the symbol, hiring the assassin to kill Drogyn — is to convince the Black Thorn that he is evil so he can infiltrate them and eventually kill them to prevent the apocalypse. Angel explains further that two months earlier, Cordelia gave Angel a vision from their farewell kiss about the Black Thorn and the apocalypse.

Spike grimly points out that it is a suicide mission as the Senior Partners will kill them all in retaliation. However, the team eventually agrees to go along with Angel's plan as Hamilton ominously watches them from the window outside the office, suspicious but unable to prove anything.

== Writing ==
The writing staff had originally hoped Sarah Michelle Gellar would return as Buffy for this episode, but Gellar was busy shooting "The Grudge" at the time. Writer David Fury says, "We did think she [Gellar] might be in the second last episode, just like Angel appeared in the second last episode of Buffy's finale. We thought we'd do that but wound up not."
