= List of minor Angel characters =

This article features minor fictional characters who appear as guest stars on the television program Angel, ordered alphabetically. For the show's main characters, please see the article list of Angel characters.

== A ==
=== Alonna Gunn ===
Alonna Gunn (played by Michele Kelly) was the sister of Charles Gunn, and the most important person in his life. The siblings took care of each other while growing up in the "Badlands" (a fictional neighborhood in Los Angeles). Alonna was turned into a vampire in her first appearance ("War Zone"). Gunn eventually found Alonna as a vampire and confronted her, but was ultimately forced to stake her with Angel looking on. Alonna continued to appear in future episodes in Gunn's memory, flashbacks, and dreams. She was also mentioned in many episodes including "That Old Gang of Mine". It was the death of Alonna that made Gunn receptive to Angel's help and also caused him to drift away from his old crew, as he was tired of seeing his friends "picked off one by one".

=== Anne Steele ===
Anne Steele (first appearing as "Chanterelle", appearing again after changing her name to "Lily", returning in Angel as Anne) is a recurring character crossed over from Buffy the Vampire Slayer, portrayed by Julia Lee. Initially known as "Chanterelle", she first appeared in the Buffy season two episode "Lie to Me" as a member of the Sunset Club, a naïve cult that worships vampires, which they refer to as "The Lonely Ones". Chanterelle discovers the true nature of vampires when the club is raided by Spike's bloodthirsty gang, and her life is saved by Buffy Summers. The character reappears in the third-season episode "Anne", now known as "Lily" and in love with a boy called Rickie. Buffy is working as a waitress at a diner under her middle name, "Anne", after running away to Los Angeles. Lily explains to Buffy that she always changes her identity and persona as she moves from place to place, admitting that she was born "Joan Appleby" and had briefly gone by the name "Sister Sunshine". When Rickie is killed by demons, Buffy and Lily are taken to a hell dimension where humans are worked as slaves. Lily helps Buffy defeat the demons, and afterwards Buffy decides to go home, leaving her job, apartment, and identity as "Anne" to Lily.

When Anne appears in the Angel Season Two episode "Blood Money", she is an administrator at a shelter for homeless teenagers called the East Hills Teen Center. In the episode, when the corrupt law firm Wolfram & Hart presents itself as a benefactor to the shelter, Angel convinces Anne to expose their plans to pocket a majority of the money raised on behalf of the shelter. Later in the season, in the episode "The Thin Dead Line", Anne helps Gunn, Wesley and Cordelia find sanctuary in her shelter from undead police officers. Anne's last onscreen appearance is in the final episode of Angel, "Not Fade Away". During what Gunn assumes will be his last day alive, he chooses to assist Anne at the shelter. Gunn asks Anne what she would do if she knew that it was all a lie, and that nothing they did would make the world any better; she asserts she would get the truck unpacked before the new stuff gets there (meaning she would continue doing all she could to improve the world).

Anne later reappears in the comic continuation, during which she is impregnated with a half-demon son; to save her from the fatal birth, Connor magically transplants the child into its father's body, killing him instead. Anne names the boy Polyphemus Darrow Steele.

The character of Anne Steele has the rare distinction of being one of few characters, not counting main cast characters, to appear at least once in both an episode of Buffy and an episode of Angel.

=== Archduke Sebassis ===
Archduke Sebassis (Leland Crooke) is a hairless demon with long, antelope-like horns, pointed ears, yellow eyes and white skin. Sebassis is the latest in a long line of demonic royalty and commands over forty demonic legions. He is the overall leader of the Circle of the Black Thorn, a secret society at the service of the Senior Partners of Wolfram & Hart charged with being the driving force behind the firm's scheduled apocalypse and with maintaining corruption in the world. His background and legions of minions are what earned him the seat in the circle in the first place. Besides the legions under his command, Sebassis is served by a number of demons of his same species. He also keeps a chained slave at his side, who provides the blue blood Sebassis is accustomed to drink.

Sebassis is one of the most famous demons in the Los Angeles underworld, for which he is invited to most events and parties, such as the Wolfram & Hart Halloween Bash, to which he was personally invited by Angel, the new CEO of W&H. At first full of contempt for Angel due to the fact he fed on pig's blood, which Sebassis considered filthy, Sebassis ultimately agrees to attend the party, after some insistence by Lorne. Sebassis was wary of a trap, so he and his people cast anti-detection spells to conceal weapons they brought with them. In the end, it was Lorne who unwittingly proved a danger, and a monster which had split off from him after he had removed his need to sleep killed one of Sebassis' aides. Angel saved Sebassis' life by restoring Lorne, and Sebassis showed his support, citing he enjoyed blood sports at social events (having previously being bored to death by the party Lorne originally organized).

Months later, Sebassis assisted in Angel's initiation to the Circle of the Black Thorn and tortured Drogyn the Battlebrand alongside the other Black Thorns. Before revealing himself, Sebassis wore a white bauta mask. At first, Sebassis was delighted, believing Angel had reverted to Angelus, but accepted the notion Angel had been corrupted instead. However, he remained suspicious Angel might be deceiving the Circle, hoping to wipe them out in hopes of fulfilling the Shanshu Prophecy contained in the Scrolls of Aberjian. At the Circle's insistence, Angel signed away his rights to the Shanshu. Sebassis never suspected Angel would kill them merely to do good and not for a reward. When Team Angel decides to destroy the Black Thorn to temporarily sever the Senior Partners' hold on Earth and go out in a blaze of glory, Angel claims he will go after Sebassis; however, Angel had earlier poisoned the blood of his slave, which spread to Sebassis the next time he drank and killed him instantly.

== B ==
=== Betta George ===
Betta George is a giant telepathic fish, a Splenden Beast, who appears solely in Angel comics. Created by Brian Lynch, he first appears in Spike: Asylum and later Spike: Shadow Puppets. Joss Whedon liked Betta George and decided that the character should appear in Angel: After the Fall, thus becoming part of the Angel canon. In the series, he is described as a Splenden Beast, a race of fish-like demons who possess extremely powerful telepathic powers, to the extent that they can even read the minds of vampires, who are typically immune to telepathy. George is seen reluctantly working for Kr'ph, the demon lord of Westwood in the hellbound Los Angeles. Kr'ph is killed by the vampire Charles Gunn, who then kidnaps Betta George. Gunn uses George's skills to allow himself to train against captive Slayers. When George, freed, is reunited with Spike and introduced to Angel, he is the one to inform the team of an enraged Illyria's motives and plan for destruction. Angel instructs George to fill Illyria's mind with Wesley and Spike's memories of Fred, and a stunned Illyria is defeated by the Senior Partners.

The canonicity of George's appearances in Asylum and Shadow Puppets are deliberately ambiguous; in After the Fall, he states, "I've hung out with vampires," which Brian Lynch claims can be interpreted as a vague reference to his previous encounters with Spike. Later issues see George contact the Mosaic Wellness Center, and other Asylum characters. Lynch says he writes George as an audience surrogate, "He's supposed to be the most normal character. Because I know that if you have a talking fish hanging out with everyone's favourite characters, people are going to not like him immediately. Because he could be Jar Jar very easily. So I try to make him the nicest, most normal character, and the one who would react like the audience would react." He also denies that Betta George speaks in any particular accent, but advises readers to hear him in their own accent, to help them identify with him.

Later, George was selected as a main character for the 2010 Spike ongoing series, which later became a miniseries due to the transfer of Angel characters and properties from IDW Publishing to Dark Horse. His final appearance is in the Angel Yearbook, IDW's send-off publication, in a story by Brian Lynch featuring the entire Angel gang.

=== Beast ===
The Beast is a demon, portrayed by Vladimir Kulich. He is very strong, able to defeat the entirety of the Angel Investigations team plus Faith with relative ease, and possesses a rock-like hide, making him highly resistant to physical damage. He first appears in the Season Four episode "Apocalypse, Nowish", when he tears his way out of the earth from the Hell dimension to which he was previously banished. The first people to encounter the Beast are Cordelia Chase and Connor, who find the Beast arriving on Earth at the exact spot at which Connor had been born. A fight ensues, during which both Connor and Cordelia are injured. Believing he has something to do with the coming apocalypse, Connor distances himself from his teammates, who do not trust him. Angel, Gunn, and Lorne decide to take on The Beast. Wesley rejoins them to help in the battle, but they fail nonetheless, and are all badly injured. The Beast then conjures a rain of fire over Los Angeles, awakening Jasmine inside of Cordelia, and causing Cordelia's possession by Jasmine.

The Beast, seeking to reach Mesektet (The Little Girl of the White Room), kills everyone working at Wolfram & Hart as he tries to reach the White Room. The Beast kills Mesektet and drains her of her dark energy. Following the death of Mesektet, the Beast hunts down the rest of her "family", an order of mystical beings known as the Ra-Tet. Ma'at, Ashet and Semkhet are killed by the Beast. The final Ra-Tet, Manjet, is killed by Jasmine/Cordelia in secret. Using the metal wings in Ashet and Semkhet and the heart of Ma'at, the Beast starts a ritual to cause a solar eclipse, which is completed when the dark energy of Mesektet is imbued in the orb which was extracted from Manjet's head. The eclipse begins as a sunlight-blocking spot that spreads covering Los Angeles and is supposed to eventually cover the totality of Earth.

Angel's team believe their only hope is in Angel's evil alter ego Angelus, who apparently knew The Beast in the past even though Angel does not remember the encounter. This is revealed to be because all references to the Beast in this dimension were magically erased. However, Angelus was unaffected as he did not, technically, exist at the time when the spell was cast.

Once freed in "Awakening", in the following episode, "Soulless", Angelus is eventually convinced to reveal the details of his encounter with the Beast; the Beast had attempted to recruit Angelus in 1789 to stop some priestesses who were attempting to banish the Beast, but Angelus declined and was knocked out before the Beast was banished. After Angel's soul is stolen and a ritual to restore his soul via dark magic is faked, in "Calvary", Angelus breaks free and seeks out the Beast. In "Salvage", Wesley breaks Faith out of jail to assist the heroes. She is beaten badly in battle with the Beast. It is then Angelus who, in an act of betrayal, stabs the Beast with a knife made from its own bones, as he had correctly surmised the only thing that could kill the Beast was the Beast itself. The death of the Beast also undoes the spell to eclipse the Sun, leaving Faith in the sunlight and Angelus confined to the shadows, much to the vampire's annoyance (Angelus hadn't expected the Beast's death would restore the Sun, but his benevolent alter ego had prior to losing his soul).

Co-executive producer Jeffrey Jackson Bell employed the effects shop Almost Human to design Vladimir Kulich's costuming and make-up. According to Almost Human makeup designer Chris Burdett, it took 2–3 days for four people to sculpt the costume and another 7 hours to fill and shape the huge fiberglass mold. Burdett explains a life cast was made of Vladimir so the suit would fit him exactly. The night before shooting was to begin, the crew finally established the costume's paint scheme.

Vladimir went through the daily eight-hour make-up process to transform him into the character of The Beast, including prosthetics and fiberglass body suit, but "The worst part was the contact lenses...[that] cover the entire eyeball," the actor said. However, the isolating nature of the 50 lb (23 kg) costume meant that "I was able to search a little deeper for material while I was in the character because I was cocooned off...It was liberating."

=== Billy Blim ===
Billy Blim (played by Justin Shilton) is a half-demon nephew of a congressman who lives in Los Angeles. He possesses the power to induce extreme misogyny in any man he touches or forces to come into contact with his body fluids. The writers have confirmed that Billy is half-demon, and that he was conceived when an evil human man raped a benevolent demon woman.

Billy is first seen in "That Vision Thing" when Angel breaks him out of a prison dimension guarded by the amiable demon Skip. His significance is not revealed until his second appearance.

In Billy's second appearance, in the eponymous "Billy" shows Cordelia has a vision of an old man murdering his wife at a grocery store. Angel and his team find out it happened a week ago and are puzzled. Billy is staying at Wolfram & Hart and is being entertained by Gavin. Lilah Morgan enters and is annoyed at this, viewing it as Gavin trying to steal the congressman's favor from her. Gavin then starts an argument with Lilah and severely beats her, leaving her with a black eye.

Angel stalks Billy and enters his house as the police arrive. Billy is taken away and touches one of the officers causing him to argue with his female partner. The lady cop shoots him and Billy is able to escape to an airport.

Cordelia, feeling responsible for the people Billy is killing, interrogates Lilah at her apartment and learns where Billy is. She confronts him at the airfield and hits him in the groin with a taser blast. Angel arrives and tells Cordelia he will handle Billy, and she replies since she is a woman, his power won't work on her.

Meanwhile, Wesley and Fred are analyzing some of Billy's blood under a microscope. As a result, Wesley accidentally touches some and is affected. Since, as Lilah said earlier "Billy's touch affects every man in a different way." Wesley's murderous misogyny is more quiet and subdued, in keeping with his personality. Fred does not realize anything is wrong until Wesley strikes her, throwing her into some stairs. She runs into some of the hotel's rooms, Wesley following closely behind and insulting her. Fred locks herself in one of the rooms and barricades the door. She is spooked by Gunn and explains the situation. Gunn is horrified to learn about the powers of Billy's blood since he accidentally touched some earlier. He gives Fred a club and tells her to knock him out. Fred falters and Gunn starts yelling at her and threatens to beat her to death, showing Billy's blood affected him nearly instantly, due to his quick temper. Fred knocks him out and goes to cower in a corner.

A short time later, Wesley breaks in and menaces Fred some more. He then trips a trap Fred set for him, causing a fire extinguisher to hit him and knock him through a hole in the floor.

Billy then touches Angel's face and stands back to watch him kill Cordelia. Angel walks up to Cordelia and then spins around and punches Billy in the face, revealing he is unaffected. He and Billy have a fistfight with Billy hitting the ground making red light flow into his body towards the end of it. Their fight is cut short when Billy is shot twice by Lilah and falls to the ground, dead.

Later, Cordelia asks why Billy's touch did not affect Angel. Angel explains when he was Angelus he killed for sport or pleasure, but was never angry with his victims, and never hated them.

=== Boone ===
Boone is a humanoid demon of an unknown species and an old rival of Angel. He was played by Mark Rolston in the episode "Blood Money". Boone met Angel in Juarez, in the 1920s, and fought over a woman while Boone was hung over. However, the fight was stopped because of sunlight, and Boone's sense of honor prevented him from taking advantage. Boone was left with the doubt of who would win in an evenly matched fight.

Decades later, the two met again and teamed up in order to humiliate Lindsey McDonald and Lilah Morgan of Wolfram & Hart. Boone offered the two lawyers his services as an assassin, and even though he told them he had no interest in money and he held no real grudge against Angel, neither Lilah nor Lindsey suspected Boone was actually in league with his supposed target.

During the Highway Robbery Ball, Boone helped Angel infiltrate the fund raiser's premises. Angel and Boone pretended to fight while Anne Steele played a tape supposedly incriminating W&H's plot to steal most of the fund raiser's money. However, the tape was nothing more than a distraction: Angel just wanted to mess with Lindsey and Lilah, using Anne in the process. Meanwhile, as the tape was played and every attendant was distracted, Boone took the two million dollars himself, as per his and Angels deal.

With Boone gone from the party, Angel thought he had seen the last of the demon. However, Boone still wanted to know who was the better warrior. In the ensuing fight, Angel proved himself as the better fighter and won the money. It's unclear if he survived the fight or not as his and Angel's blood covered the money which Angel gave to Anne.

Boone can emit coils of a metallic material that wrap around his fists, thus making his punches even more damaging. Like most regular demons he also has superhuman strength. His demon physiology also appears to give him a lifespan much longer than that of a human.

=== Trish and Roger Burkle ===
Trish and Roger Burkle (played by Jennifer Griffin and Gary Grubbs) are the parents of Winifred Burkle. They appear in four episodes of Angel: "Fredless," "A Hole in the World, "Shells" and "The Girl in Question." In their first appearance, they come to Los Angeles looking for Fred, who has been lost for five years. Due to Fred's reluctance to see her parents, the gang at Angel Investigations believes at first that the Burkles may have been abusive, but later discover they are in fact loving and supportive, and that Fred's strange behavior stems from her trauma at having been lost in Pylea. Once the misunderstanding is cleared up, the Burkles take the existence of the supernatural in stride and prove friendly, brave, and resourceful; at one point Trish, a retired school bus driver, rescues the gang from a demon by driving a bus into it, while Roger and Angel bond over their shared knowledge that Spiro Agnew was a Grathnar demon. When Fred decides that her place is with the Angel Investigations team, Trish and Roger respectfully accept her decision. Their second and third appearances are in flashbacks as they see Fred off to L.A. to pursue her graduate studies. In their fourth and last appearance, they show up for a surprise visit at Wolfram & Hart, not knowing Fred has been killed. Illyria assumes Fred's appearance and manner for the duration of their visit, and they leave never the wiser.

They later reappear in Angel: Only Human, in which they attend the funeral of Fred's uncle. They remain unaware of Fred's death, dismissing the form and appearance of Illyria as a "blue goth phase."

== C ==
=== Cordelia (dragon) ===
Cordelia is a dragon that first appears in "Not Fade Away" and features prominently in Angel: After the Fall. It appears as part of the demon army sent by the Senior Partners to destroy Angel's team; Angel expresses a desire to slay it. However, early on in the fight, Angel discovers that the dragon is in fact good, but had been duped into fighting on the wrong side just as he had. When the Senior Partners send L.A. to Hell, the dragon discovers Angel, who, unaware that the Partners had made him human again, had jumped off a rooftop and broke his spine and both his legs. The dragon subsequently took him to the W&H building, where he was subjected to a months-long ritual to heal his broken body. Angel spent every second awake and in agony, and dealt with the pain by talking to an imaginary Cordelia Chase; the dragon, thinking that Angel was talking to him, thus believed that "Cordelia" was his name. He assists Angel in combating the Demon Lords and a traitorous Gwen Raiden before he is ripped apart by hostile dragons, only to be resurrected when the Senior Partners took back the fall. In order to remain as inconspicuous as possible, Angel leaves Cordelia in the care of the Groosalugg.

=== Cyvus Vail ===
Cyvus Vail (Dennis Christopher) is a powerful and elderly demon warlock, recognizable by his red skin and stringy white hair, whose influence extends throughout Los Angeles thanks to his vast economic power and his membership of the Circle of the Black Thorn. Vail led the team of warlocks who performed the reality alteration allowing Angel's son Connor to obtain a normal life. He also has a grudge against the demon Sahjhan, whom Vail is unable to fight due to his failing health, which forces him to receive continuous IV transfusions. Vail mentions Sahjhan has "a nasty habit of trying to kill [him]". Cyvus Vail thus manipulates Angel to allow Connor to fight Sahjhan (Connor was prophesied to kill Sahjhan), who had been imprisoned in an urn which Cyvus had now obtained. The only way for Connor to be ruthless and skilled enough to fight Sahjhan, however, is to restore his memories, which Wesley does by smashing the Orlon Window which held them. He does so, thinking he might be able to bring Fred back to life. Connor proceeds to kill Sahjhan.

Vail goes underground to escape Angel's retaliation, but is present at Angel's initiation in the Circle of the Black Thorn, wearing a Venetian scaramouche mask, characterized by its long nose. The old demon paid his respects and accepted Angel's statement he had been pretending to look for Vail. However, he remained distrustful of Angel and feared he was merely pretending to have been corrupted in order to infiltrate the Circle. He also wanted to keep close tabs on Wesley, whom Vail considered unstable and a loose cannon that would betray Angel to obtain his seat in the Circle. Wesley had more influence on Illyria than any other member of Angel's team.

When Angel decides to wipe out the entire Circle, Angel chooses Wesley to attack and kill Vail because he is the only one capable of facing Vail's warlock powers. Despite managing to take Vail by surprise with a fire ball, Vail subsequently immobilizes Wesley and stabs him in the gut. A last-ditch magical attack by Wesley knocks Vail out for a few moments. As Wesley lies dying, Illyria comes to his aid out of concern for his life. Illyria takes on the form of Fred to comfort him in his last moments and allowing him to say good-bye to the woman he loved. The revived Vail, not realizing who Illyria really is, taunts her to take her "best shot". She proceeds to kill Vail by shattering his skull to pieces with a single punch.

== D ==
=== Dana ===
Dana (Navi Rawat) is a Potential Slayer, meaning that she could become a Vampire Slayer one day, though she apparently did not know this. When she was 10 years old, her family was murdered by a man named Walter Kindel, who kidnapped, drugged, and tortured Dana until she managed to escape. The ordeal at Kindel's hands, however, had left Dana severely traumatized, and she was confined in a psychiatric hospital. During her stay at the hospital, Dana experienced visions and dreams, like other potential Slayers.

At the time of "Chosen", Dana's Slayer powers manifested, thanks to Willow Rosenberg's spell which activated all potential Slayers. Unfortunately, the dreams and memories of past Slayers pushed her further over the edge and she began speaking quotes from past Slayers, even in their native languages (Romanian, Chinese, etc.).

Dana escapes several months later ("Damage"). During and after her escape, she injures or kills several innocent people. Both Angel and Spike attempt to track her down; Spike faces Dana twice, and on both occasions, she manifests the personalities of the two Slayers whom Spike has killed in his life, causing Spike to initially mistake her new Slayer status for possession by a Chinese demon when she taps into the Slayer he killed during the Boxer Rebellion.

Due to her insanity, Dana begins to confuse her own memories with those of the past Slayers, and begins to believe Spike and Kindel are the same person. She captures him and saws off his hands, declaring he "can't touch [her]" now. Angel later apprehends Dana, but Andrew Wells and a squad of Slayers arrive and take her into custody, stating they (including Buffy and the rest of the Scooby Gang) no longer trust him due to his current status as head of Wolfram & Hart. In an effort to state their intentions Andrew declares: "I've got 12 vampire slayers behind me and none of them has ever dated you." They declare they will help her, since she is one of their own, and take her away.

=== David Nabbit ===
David Nabbitt, played by David Herman, is a wealthy software developer living in Los Angeles, who appears in three episodes of the first and second seasons of Angel. He is a lonely man with no real friends, who throws extravagant parties for his clients at which he sits quietly in the corner. Nabbitt first appears in the episode "War Zone", in which he hires Angel to track down a blackmailer. He appears later in the episodes "To Shanshu in L.A." and "First Impressions"; in both episodes he shows up at Angel's offices wearing a purple Dungeon Master cape, hoping pathetically, but futilely, to be included in Angel's adventures. In the latter episode, he gives Angel some useful advice on how to finance his purchase of the Hyperion Hotel; this is his last appearance in the series. (Also revealed in this episode is the fact that he made his first million developing a product that lets blind people use the internet.)

=== Dennis Pearson ===
Dennis Pearson (portrayed as a human by B. J. Porter) first appears in the first season Angel episode "Rm w/a Vu". Cordelia moved into an apartment where Dennis and his mother, Maude Pearson, once resided. The Angel Investigations team, which consisted of Angel, Cordelia Chase, and Doyle at the time, discovered the apartment was haunted by Dennis' mother Maude who killed three women under the impression all three of them were involved with Dennis.

After some investigation, the gang discovered Maude Pearson had died of what was believed to be a heart attack on the same day her son had disappeared. The group came to the conclusion Dennis had killed his mother in order to be with a woman she didn't approve of. However, after being haunted by the ghost of Maude, Cordelia (possessed by Dennis) breaks down a wall in her house, revealing the still tied-up body of Dennis Pearson. The team deduces Maude had tied her son up when she learned he was leaving her to be with his girlfriend. She then built a brick wall and trapped him inside, where he suffocated to death. When Cordelia broke down the wall, it unleashes the spirit of Dennis, who destroys his mother's ghost. Because the ghost of Dennis still inhabits the apartment, and Cordelia refuses to move out, Dennis resides with Cordelia as an invisible, and rather benevolent, roommate.

Their "living" situation continues until Cordy comes back from being a higher being in season 4, with Dennis never being seen again. It can be assumed Dennis is still 'haunting' the apartment Cordelia used to live in. He is occasionally referred to as "the phantom Dennis."

Though normally invisible, Dennis possesses a monstrous physical form, as a ghostly skull surrounded by tendrils of light. He appears in this form when Cordelia breaks down the wall where his corpse was hidden.

=== Desdemona ===
Desdemona, or Dez, is a werecat featured in Angel: Aftermath. Dez was once a jaguar cub, who was captured by Mayan priests and transformed into a human along with her sister, Penelope (Pen for short). The two were raised to be the priests' "Jaguar Warriors" to fight on their side during a prophesied Apocalypse (presumably the Shanshu Prophecy). They were subject to monthly rituals to retain their human forms, but were also kept prisoner and beaten. Eventually growing tired of being treated like common animals, Dez and Pen escaped and traveled to Los Angeles just as the Senior Partners transported into Hell. Dez found work as an assassin for the Demon Lord of Sherman Oaks, but Pen began to revert to her feline form; Dez attempted to perform the ritual, but it failed when the Senior Partners returned L.A. to Earth and Pen subsequently disappeared.
Soon afterwards, animals across L.A. were being transformed into humans, and Dez, realizing that the animals did not want to be human, worked to change them back. While doing so, she was ordered to assassinate Angel to pay off her debt to her Lord, but she refused and joined Angel Investigations, who, after some difficulties concerning her motives, helped her return the transfigured animals back to normal.
Sometime afterwards, the mystical side effects of Illyria's heat period caused Dez to engage in a three-way with Angel and Kate Lockley. Shortly afterwards, however, Liss Hubble, a soul-sucking demon sent by James to destroy Angel and Spike, attacks Angel Investigations and consumes Dez's soul before being slain by Angel, who promises Illyria that they would grieve for their comrade later.

=== Doctor Sparrow ===
Doctor Sparrow, played by Marc Vann, appears in three episodes in Season Five of Angel: "Conviction", "Smile Time", and "Shells". Sparrow is a surgeon who performs contracts for Wolfram & Hart.

In "Conviction", on the orders of the Senior Partners, Sparrow implants Gunn with absolute knowledge of all human and demon laws, demonic languages, golf techniques, and Gilbert & Sullivan compositions, thus making him the head of Wolfram & Hart's Legal Department.

He next appears in "Smile Time", when Gunn discovers that he is losing his mental upgrades; not wanting to go back to simply being "the muscle" of Angel's crew, Gunn makes a deal with Sparrow: in exchange for getting a sarcophagus out of Customs, his upgrade is improved and made permanent.

In "Shells", Sparrow is revealed to be a worshipper of Illyria, conspiring with Knox to resurrect her using Fred's body. Upon discovering this, Gunn assaults Sparrow, demanding knowledge of how to bring Fred back and eject Illyria from her body, but Sparrow calmly informs him that Fred's soul was completely destroyed when Illyria was resurrected; thus, Fred is indeed gone forever. After telling Gunn that he now has to live with the consequences of their deal, he is pistol-whipped by Wesley and subsequently tortured by Spike, ultimately revealing Illyria's plans.

Sparrow returns in the post-Not Fade Away comic Angel: Old Friends, in which he creates evil clones of the Angel Investigations team as he last saw them and sends them out to destroy the originals. Angel, Spike, Gunn, and Illyria easily take care of the assorted doubles and track Sparrow down. Ultimately, Angel's clone (the last one left alive) betrays Sparrow and destroys his work before dying himself.

=== Drogyn ===
A mystic warrior who has been alive for at least a thousand years and who had encountered Angel at some point during the twentieth century. Drogyn (portrayed by Alec Newman) first appears in "A Hole in the World", where it is revealed that, since meeting Angel, he has become the keeper of the Deeper Well, a prison for ancient dead demons. The Well travels straight through the entire planet, with a mouth in the Cotswolds, in rural England. Drogyn himself is mystically compelled to answer all questions truthfully. This sometimes results in violent lashing out when people ask him questions.

Angel and Spike go to the Deeper Well to try to prevent the resurrection of the ancient demon Illyria. This demon is killing Fred in order to claw its way back into the world. Drogyn informs them that he can save Fred and draw Illyria back to the Deeper Well, but Illyria's essence would spread to and kill everyone between the Cotswolds and Los Angeles in the process. As much as they care for Fred, Angel and Spike are unwilling to let such an atrocity happen, and thus Illyria is reborn.

Drogyn returns in "Power Play", where he arrives in Los Angeles after he is badly injured by a demon assassin and believes it was sent by Angel. This is in fact Angel's intention as part of a larger plan. Drogyn believes Illyria was freed by Angel in order to kill Fred, an accomplishment which would endear him to the powerful demonic organization called the Circle of the Black Thorn. Illyria, now somewhat loyal to Angel, is left with Drogyn as a bodyguard. Marcus Hamilton, an agent of Wolfram & Hart defeats Illyria and takes Drogyn to the Circle. After much torture, Drogyn is presented to Angel, who then kills him as a further step to infiltrate and deceive the group.

== E ==
=== Eddie Hope ===
Eddie Hope is an ice-manipulating devil who appears in the IDW ongoing series. After the Senior Partners took back the Fall, Eddie embarked on a campaign to destroy people known to have committed atrocities during L.A.'s time in hell. He has recently been shown coming after Gunn due to his actions in Hell as a vampire.

== F ==
=== Lavinia and Sophronia Fairweather ===
Lavinia and Sophronia Fairweather are two sisters who are the aunts of Rupert Giles. They assist Angel and Faith in the Buffy the Vampire Slayer Season Nine companion series Angel & Faith, joining him in his quest to resurrect Giles. Like Giles, they come from a family of Watchers and witches. Vain and spoiled by nature, they used their magical powers to ensure they would remain forever ageless, but began to age again when the end of magic caused by Buffy and Angel in Season Eight ended their spells. Towards the end of the series, they are successful in creating a ritual with Angel to resurrect Giles, using collected fragments of Giles' soul and magical artifacts to power the spell. However, Giles returns to life a young boy, influenced by his aunts' memories of him. They assist in the final battle against Whistler, Pearl and Nash, and take credit for saving London and the wider world from an apocalypse. They later make appearances in Season Ten, once magic has been restored, and remain allies of Angel.

Lavinia and Sophronia are patterned on Emily and Daisy Head, the real-life daughters of Rupert Giles' portrayer Anthony Stewart Head. The characters were originally developed for the Buffy BBC spin-off Ripper, which had been intended as a vehicle for Anthony Head, featuring flashbacks to Giles' wayward youth.

== G ==
=== Gavin Park ===
Park was a corporate lawyer for Wolfram & Hart played by Daniel Dae Kim. First appearing in one episode in season two, he was present for parts of seasons three and four, and had a running competition with Lilah Morgan. Gavin filled the void Lindsey McDonald left by becoming Lilah's company rival, although he tended to focus on attempting to hamper Angel via exclusively legal means- such as threatening to take the Hyperion Hotel from him by accusing him of lease violations- rather than the more mystical methods of attack used by Lindsey and Lilah. He and Lilah seemed to be both striving for the same promotion. After Lilah became "Head of Special Projects" (effectively becoming his boss), Gavin became more taciturn. Gavin's greatest success was installing surveillance equipment in the Hyperion to spy on Team Angel, only for the devices to be discovered and rendered useless when Lorne—who possessed hearing sensitive enough to hear the hums generated by the devices—moved in. He was killed by The Beast in season four, but then re-animated as a zombie by Wolfram & Hart. The Zombie Gavin was killed by Gunn, who claimed he didn't like seeing somebody he knew like that no matter how much he didn't like Gavin.

=== Gwen Raiden ===
Gwen Raiden (portrayed by Alexa Davalos) is first introduced in season four's "Ground State" as a girl with the ability to funnel electricity. (She shares her name with Raiden, a thunder and lightning god in Japanese mythology.) Her backstory is shown to the audience before the primary action of the episode takes place. Born with these abilities, Gwen has little control over her abilities as a child, and in 1985, is taken to a boarding school. She accidentally kills one of her new classmates when a toy car he offers to share conducts her electrical charge into him.

In 2002, the 25-year-old Gwen is using her powers to facilitate her career as a successful, wealthy, professional thief. She meets Angel when she is hired to steal a valuable artifact called The Axis of Pythia, which he needs in order to find Cordelia Chase on her higher plane. Finding the artifact, Gwen and Angel fight over its possession. During the course of the battle, Gwen tries to kill Angel with an electric shock. However, since he is already dead, her attack actually serves to make his dead heart beat again for a few seconds (this power had been illustrated earlier in the episode, where she restarts Gunn's normal heartbeat after her own powers affected him). Caught in the moment, Angel gives Gwen a passionate kiss. After he regains his focus on Cordelia, the man who hired Gwen reveals he had trapped her and intended to kill her with poison gas. The vampiric Angel is unaffected by the gas, enabling him to rescue Gwen. In gratitude, Gwen allows Angel to use the artifact. Afterwards, he returns it to her, and she presumably sells it for a high price.

The second time Gwen appears (in "Long Day's Journey"), she assists Angel in fighting against the machinations of The Beast and takes an interest in Gunn. During her last appearance, she asks Gunn to help her with a mission under the pretense of helping a kidnapped girl; in fact, she is trying to steal an experimental device which will allow her to touch others without killing them. Gunn agrees and ultimately helps her to steal the item. Gwen is grateful for Gunn helping her and the two have sex once the device is installed and seems to be functional.

Gwen has the ability to generate and manipulate electricity. This power can be used in several ways, from creating powerful and damaging electric blasts to manipulating and controlling electronic devices. The latter proves especially useful in her role as a high-tech, professional thief, a career at which she seems especially skilled and adept, making herself quite wealthy in the process. She can also use the electricity that she generates internally to augment her physical performance, allowing her to hold her own against Angel in hand-to-hand combat. Although her powers initially came with dangerous, uncontrollable elements, the inability to touch others and the tendency to attract lightning, these drawbacks appear to have been rectified after use of the device she appropriated in her final televised appearance.

In Angel: After The Fall, Gwen provides humans and good demons sanctuary with the help of Nina Ash and Connor after Los Angeles was sent to hell by the Senior Partners. She joins Angel in his battle for control of all of Los Angeles. Gwen and Connor are romantically involved, though the fall of Los Angeles rendered her control device ineffective. This lack of control had led her to accidentally kill a boyfriend while they were on the beach. Soon, Gwen betrays Angel's crew to their enemies and, after a brief fight with Angel's dragon, sacrifices herself to destroy some of the legions of dragons sent by the Senior Partners, only to be revived when the Senior Partners rewind time. She is currently a full-time member of Angel Investigations, having joined in an attempt to regain Connor's trust.

Later, Gwen captures the werecat Desdemona, believing her to be turning humans into animals. However, the discovery that Dez was actually reversing the unwilling transformation of animals into humans, as well as Gwen's inhumane treatment of her, only increases Connor's hostility towards her. She is currently one of the people on Eddie Hope's hit list.

== H ==
=== Holland Manners ===
Holland Manners (portrayed by Sam Anderson) is head of Special Projects at Wolfram & Hart, and is instrumental in the goings-on there in parts of the first and second seasons. He supervises Lilah Morgan, Lee Mercer and a number of other lawyers at the beginning of the series. He enforces loyalty by using mind-readers, and arranges the deaths of persons both outside the firm and within it who are seen as a threat to its interests. During his first years in the firm, Holland also recruited personnel, as he recruited fallen champion Número Cinco.

In early 2000, Holland is supervising the legal team defending assassin Vanessa Brewer, while at the same time rooting out the best among the lawyers under his supervision. He uses a pair of mind readers and discovers that Lee Mercer has chosen to move to a rival firm and take his client list with him. Manners immediately has Mercer shot. The mind-readers also detect that Lindsey has agreed to help Angel save three innocent children, putting Holland in the difficult decision of whether to terminate Lindsey, who had become Holland's favorite in the company, or not. Lindsey, however, has prepared incriminating evidence against his employer. In recognition of Lindsey's savvy and aware of his potential, Manners allows him to have a "crisis of faith" and then offers him a promotion.

In his last years at the firm, Manners personally supervises Wolfram & Hart's operations regarding Angel. In particular, he oversees the resurrection of Angel's sire Darla and orchestrates her return to vampirism by Drusilla in an attempt to corrupt Angel.

Holland Manners is eventually killed by Darla and Drusilla in his wine cellar during their ploy to get revenge on Wolfram & Hart for using them as pawns against Angel. Ironically, before his death, Holland pleads with Angel to save him, but, in a form of poetic justice, he had succeeded in corrupting Angel so thoroughly that Angel instead walks away, leaving Darla and Drusilla to kill Manners and the other employees. Holland's position at the Special Projects Division is given to Lindsey and Lilah jointly, while the firm itself is overseen by Nathan Reed.

However, his employment with Wolfram and Hart does not end with his death: according to company practice, his contract binds him to the firm for eternity. Thus, when Angel attempts to reach the Senior Partners via the elevator of Wolfram & Hart, he is greeted by Holland, who takes the opportunity to mock Angel's desire to destroy the Senior Partners and prevent their desired apocalypse, pointing out that there will surely be another apocalypse to follow it (as seen on Buffy the Vampire Slayer, apocalypses of various kinds are indeed a recurring threat in the Buffyverse, and preventing one does nothing to forestall a subsequent one), and to inform Angel that Wolfram and Hart's power in fact comes from the evil within humanity itself, which completely breaks Angel's spirit. He leaves and is presumably still working for the Partners.

In contrast to his charming personality, Manners has proven himself to be one of the most cold-hearted agents in Wolfram & Hart's employ. He shows no hesitation or remorse when liquidating any and all threats to the interests of the firm. Respected and feared by those around him, he conceals his incredibly calculating mind behind the guise of a caring father figure, in a manner similar to Mayor Wilkins. He uses power's allure to control those below him and keep their interests in line with Wolfram & Hart's agenda. When Angel tells him that his actions will cause the death of several innocents, he coldly replies, "And yet, somehow, I just can't seem to care." Angel repeats this line when Manners, about to be murdered along with his guests by Drusilla and Darla, begs Angel to save them.

== I ==
=== Ilona Costa Bianchi ===
Ilona Costa Bianchi is the voluptuous Italian CEO of Wolfram and Hart's Rome offices in "The Girl in Question". She is fluent in English and superficially very helpful, although she appears to have little respect for Spike and Angel's ability to deal with the complexities of Roman life. She gives them replacement jackets after an explosion. She twice refers to the gypsies who cursed Angel, both times spitting and saying "We will speak of them no more." She implies that she has slept with The Immortal. Played by Carole Davis.

=== The Immortal ===
The Immortal is first mentioned in the episode "The Girl in Question". The Immortal's face never appears on screen (though his back is presumably seen when he dances with the pseudo-Buffy). Secondhand accounts describe him as incredibly attractive, athletic, intelligent and also apparently genuinely immortal. He has accomplished numerous incredible feats and managed to seduce many women, including Darla and Drusilla (simultaneously, in fact), while holding Angelus and Spike in chains. This event leading both vampires to share a grudge towards their captor, which continues even after they both regained their souls.

In the fifth season of Angel, Andrew Wells says Buffy has been dating the Immortal. In Joss Whedon's canonical comic series of Buffy's eighth season, it is revealed it is not really Buffy who is dating the Immortal, but one of her two decoys pretending to be her so she can stay hidden from evil forces. Andrew was the one who decided the Buffy decoy should date the Immortal, because he "thought it would be funny." Both Angel and Spike still view the Immortal as one of their greatest enemies, resenting him apparently again being involved with another woman in their lives. Buffy herself doesn't know why Andrew thought it would be funny.

Not much information is given about who or what the Immortal is; Darla says "he's not some common vampire," though it is ambiguous whether she is disparaging the claim of common or vampire, or both. According to Angel and Spike, he "may or may not be evil." He is also said to have climbed Mount Everest several times, had numerous encounters with the Roman office of Wolfram and Hart, got Spike arrested for tax evasion, and wrote a self-help book that is "a real life-changer." He also supposedly disdains the use of magic, finding it to be vulgar.

The Immortal makes an appearance in the Buffyverse Expanded Universe (non-canon), in the novel Queen of the Slayers, which details the start of the relationship between Buffy and the Immortal.

=== Izzerial the Devil ===
Izzerial or "Izzy" (Mark Colson), a member of the Circle of the Black Thorn, appears in three episodes of season 5. He is first seen in a brief exchange with Angel in "You're Welcome". He returns in "Power Play", playing racquetball with Angel. He is a red-faced devil, and informs Angel that the Fell Brethren are pleased with their sacrifice, a baby, that Angel acquired for them. When Angel inquires about receiving an answer about his initiation into the circle, Izzy tells him it will be soon.

Izzy appears later in the same episode after Angel kills Drogyn, drinking champagne and introducing Angel to the various other members.

In the final episode, "Not Fade Away", Izzy stabs Angel so that he may sign away the Shanshu prophecy with his own blood. Illyria is sent by Angel to kill Izzy and three other members of the Black Thorn after their dinner engagement. After he gets into his car with the other members, Illyria appears and easily kills the four of them.

== J ==
=== Jamaerah ===
Jamaerah, or James, is introduced as a member of the Potentates, a warrior race of angels in service to the Powers That Be, who appears in post-Angel: After the Fall comics. He was created by fantasy writer Kelley Armstrong. At some point in his backstory, James disobeyed the orders of the Powers and was sentenced to live on Earth for a century as punishment. While Los Angeles was in hell, an army of Potentates fought against the Senior Partners's forces. When time was reverted, they were all captured, and James was sent to the hospital where he was rescued by Angel, who helped him track down the other Potentates. However, Angel turned against the Potentates when he discovered that they were hunting down and killing humans for crimes that they had yet to commit, and James sided with him. As their mission was not to kill Angel, the Potentates retreated, and James joined Angel Investigations.

However, when former Watcher Laura Kay Weathermill joined the team, James's true purpose was revealed in Bill Willingham's story arc "Immortality for Dummies". He was not actually an angel, but an as-yet-unidentified demonic higher power who had allegedly "purchased" Earth from his sister and had been "examining his property". His deception exposed, he escaped, but not before beating Laura unconscious and ripping off Angel's hands and feet with his bare hands, subsequently summoning a soul-sucking demon to kill Angel and Spike while he carried out his plans. It has recently been revealed that James intends to transform the Earth into a demonic breeding farm using the humans as incubators, beginning these plans by donating laced food to the people at Anne Steele's homeless shelter.

=== Justine Cooper ===
Justine Cooper (portrayed by Laurel Holloman) is a young woman who becomes a vampire hunter after her twin sister, Julia Cooper, is killed by vampires. Unable to cope with the death of Julia, Justine turns to alcohol and roams graveyards at nights, killing any vampire she encounters.

She is the first vengeful soul Daniel Holtz recruits in his battle against Angel. After having her hand impaled with an ice pick for hours, she reluctantly joins the cause and forms a bond with him. Justine seeks out others who, like herself and Holtz, lost loved ones to vampires and were consumed by their desire for revenge. Wesley, who is meeting in secret with Holtz in order to protect Connor, tries to reach out and turn Justine away from Holtz.

However, Justine deceives Wesley and slits his throat in order to kidnap Connor and deliver him to Holtz. After a standoff amongst the members of Wolfram and Hart, Angel and Sahjhan, Holtz abandons Justine and jumps into the hell dimension, Quor-toth. Justine, amazed and saddened rallies the remaining members of Holtz's militia to kill Angel. She fails, but hours later, she imprisons the demon Sahjhan in a Resikhian Urn in revenge for trapping Holtz in Quor-Toth.

Upon his return to Earth, Holtz is found by Justine and prompts her to kill him. She stabs him in the throat with an ice pick, making the wounds resemble a vampire bite mark. Following Holtz's last wish, she frames Angel for the killing by telling Connor that Angel was the one who killed Holtz. She then aids Connor in his plan to trap Angel at the bottom of the ocean.

In the following months, Justine is kidnapped by Wesley under unknown circumstances, who imprisons her in a closet, bound and gagged, with a little food and a bucket. Reluctantly, she helps him find the metal box in which she and Connor put Angel, while at the same time, Justine taunts Wesley by telling him he has turned to evil, "banging the enemy and keeping slave girl in his closet". Wesley counters by telling her that she had been a slave to Holtz and to her own desire for revenge. Wesley had broken Justine to the point of being capable of dissuading her from attacking him by threatening to take away her bucket.

Back on land and with Angel released, Wesley cuffs Justine to a railing. She taunts Wesley once more, telling him Angel will turn on him. Wesley merely throws her the key to her cuff and tells her she now has the choice of moving on with her life or continue to be a slave.

== K ==
=== Knox ===
Knox (portrayed by Jonathan Woodward) first appears in "Home", the final episode of Season Four of Angel; he gives Fred a tour of Wolfram & Hart's science lab. In Season Five, Fred becomes Knox's boss, although the two seem to work mostly as partners, and Knox quickly develops a crush on her. Fred rejects Knox's advances at first, but the two date for a while. Fred eventually decides they had best remain friends and co-workers – concluding she wanted someone who made her laugh, and Knox had been working at Wolfram & Hart for too long to be the 'right' kind of funny – and pursues a relationship with Wesley.

In "A Hole in the World", Knox is revealed to be a worshipper of Illyria, one of the Old Ones, and the mastermind behind the demon's resurrection in Fred's body. Once Illyria has taken over Fred's body and returned to Wolfram & Hart to recuperate her full powers, Knox reveals himself as her Qwa'ha Xahn, her High Priest. Knox has worshipped Illyria since he was eleven and confesses to spending hours staring at illustrations that represent the demon. Illyria takes Knox to her former site of worship, hoping to break the lock on the portal to her temple. Before she can jump through the portal, she and Knox are confronted by Angel, Spike and Wesley. In his grief for Fred, and rage at Knox's betrayal, Wesley shoots Knox dead, unfortunately ruining a profound speech Angel had just been attempting to make about how he would still fight for Knox's life despite what Knox had done to them.

Jonathan Woodward says Knox is "a complete indulgence in all of the parts of myself that I am most shy about." After reading the script for "Smile Time" in which it was clear Knox and Fred were not going to be falling in love, Woodward says he was "very sad but I think it was nice, because it took Knox from all of the ways you thought Knox would be." He had tried to predict the character's arc, he says, but "they picked the one I couldn't even think of. You know something is going happen but they pick the thing you know nobody had been able to figure out."

== L ==
=== Landok ===
Landokmar of the Deathwok Clan, better known as Landok, is an Anagogic demon, a member of the Deathwok Clan and cousin of Lorne. He was portrayed by Brody Hutzler. Having been transported to Los Angeles via a portal, Landok encounters Angel, Cordelia, Wesley and Lorne as they are investigating a library while searching for information about a portal, subsequently allying himself with them to hunt a drokken – a beast from his own dimension. Despite his general disdain for humans like everyone in his dimension, Landok is impressed by Angel's skills as a warrior when he defeats the drokken in single combat, and although Angel's standing goes down when he refuses to execute the captive Winifred Burkle as part of a celebration, he still helps the group reassemble the body parts of his cousin Lorne, who was considered a traitor.

=== Laura Weathermill ===
Laura Kay Weathermill is an ex-member of the Watchers' Council who appears in the ongoing IDW comic series. Despite her youthful appearance, she is in fact in her late forties or early fifties, having been working for the council for forty-seven years. After the council was destroyed by agents of the First Evil and subsequently rebuilt under better pretenses by Buffy Summers and her allies, Laura forsook the good fight and focused instead on making money. At one point, she was hired by Innovation Labs, whose attempts to duplicate Angel's status as a vampire with a soul had failed, but she simply staked all of their vampire clients outright. Meeting Angel and Illyria in the process of their destroying Innovation Labs, she subsequently joined Angel Investigations as their new research and intelligence specialist. While interviewing members of the team, she discovered the true demonic nature of James, and was subsequently beaten unconscious and left with a broken leg.

After she regained consciousness, she was confronted by Spike, who asked her about the precise nature of prophecies and whether or not they were ever explicit about anything (curious over whether or not the Shanshu Prophecy was truly meant for Angel), only for the two to have sex due to the mystical side effects of Illyria's heat period. Later, when Liss attacks A.I. under James' orders and claims that Spike is currently soulless, Laura attempts to weaken her by mixing Illyria's blood with a potion in a bath, though the attempt fails and Liss kills Dez before being killed by Angel in turn. Subsequently, Laura discovered that Liss could not detect Spike's soul because he had been infected with a rare spiritual parasite when he was revived as a ghost at Wolfram & Hart, and agrees to attempt a ritual to remove it from Spike's body.

=== Lee Mercer ===
Lee Mercer was a colleague of Lindsay and Lilah in the first season, played by Thomas Burr. This triad of lawyers (all with the initials L.M.) became so annoyed with Angel's meddling that they hired Faith to kill Angel. Lee was killed when Holland Manners accused him of planning to leave the firm and take clients with him. Mr. Mercer claims he misled his prospective employers and did not really intend to leave Wolfram & Hart. His first appearance was in Sense & Sensitivity as Little Tony's lawyer, terminating their connection at the end of the episode.

=== Linwood Murrow ===
Linwood Murrow, played by John Rubinstein, was a lawyer for Los Angeles branch of Wolfram & Hart whose children were taken by the Senior Partners. As President of Special Projects Division, he was the direct superior of Lilah Morgan. Unlike preceding W&H leaders Holland Manners or Nathan Reed, Linwood was more concerned with his personal agenda and safety than with Wolfram & Hart's plot to corrupt Angel, going as far as trying to kill Angel, which was a violation of company policy. Lilah often clashed with Linwood, unlike Gavin Park, who followed Linwood in an attempt to get rid of Lilah. Linwood oversees the attempt to capture Connor for scientific study, this results in Angel storming Wolfram & Hart, cutting Linwood's cheek due to Connor having a cut on his cheek and telling him that if anything happened to Connor, Linwood would be held accountable, naming him Connor's godfather. Angel would later abduct Linwood after Connor was taken to Quor'Toth, forcing him to help. Linwood is eventually replaced by Lilah Morgan who had spoken to the Senior Partners about him and his fear of Angel. Linwood accused her of going over his head, at which point, she decapitated him with a blade hidden in his chair, replying she went "just under it".

=== Liss Hubble ===
Liss Hubble is a Soul Eater that appears in the IDW "Connorland" arc. Shortly after James is outed as a demon by Laura Weathermill, he raises Liss from the body of a murdered apartment tenant and sends her after Angel and Spike. Tracking down Bradley Hubble, an Angel Investigations client, Liss uses him to get into the Hyperion and uses his unpaid bill as an excuse to meet Angel and Spike. Upon doing so, she injures both vampires and then declares that Spike is apparently soulless. Despite this shock, Spike and Illyria successfully subdue Liss, and she is kept underwater in a bathtub filled with a mixture of a potion and Illyria's blood for five hours. Eventually, the starving Liss escapes and devours Desdemona's soul before being beheaded and stabbed in the lower spine by Angel.

== M ==
=== Merl ===
Merl (Matthew James) is a tongue-less Parasite demon with the reputation of a snitch among the underworld community. He hangs around mostly at Caritas, the karaoke bar that fellow green-skinned demon Lorne runs. He is introduced to Angel by Wesley, who had used his services before, in exchange for money. Afterwards, he is frequently used by Angel for information about the vampires Darla and Drusilla. However, instead of being paid for his services, Angel constantly abuses Merl (both verbally and physically) in order to force him to give him information, similar to how Willy the Snitch was regularly beaten up by Buffy for information in Buffy seasons 2 and 3.

Merl is largely used for comedic relief during the darker turn the show takes during its second season, centered around the frequent abuse the character is forced to endure. Over the course of the second season, Merl grows to dislike Angel, and his friends by association. Early in the third season Angel attempts to apologize to Merl, but before he can do so Merl is killed by a new demon killer called Gio, who runs with Gunn's old hunting crew.

== N ==
=== Nathan Reed ===
Nathan Reed (Gerry Becker) was Lilah and Lindsay's new superior after Holland Manners' death. He appeared in "Blood Money", "Reprise" and "Dead End". He disappeared following season two, and was never mentioned again.

=== Nina Ash ===
Nina Ash (portrayed by Jenny Mollen) is introduced in the third episode of the fifth season, "Unleashed". A young art major living at home with her older sister and niece, she is bitten by a werewolf during a night run. She herself eventually becomes a werewolf and a potential love interest for Angel. After becoming a werewolf, she voluntarily comes to Wolfram & Hart every month during the full moon in order to be caged, a similar arrangement Oz had in the Sunnydale High library. During the episode "Smile Time", Angel realizes, with the help of Wesley, it is time to pick up the pieces of his shattered love life and ask Nina out for coffee. This is hindered by the fact that Angel has morphed into a puppet, but regardless, he overcomes his fear of dating and invites her to breakfast.

Although Spike already references her as Angel's girlfriend in "The Girl in Question", she is not seen again on-screen until episode 21, "Power Play". She and Angel are seen in bed, and she jokes about whether or not Angel is perfectly happy. She tries to get closer to Angel, who, worried about the impending apocalypse at the hands of the Senior Partners, tries to send Nina, her sister, and her niece away. Nina is angered at this, and argues with Angel, but appears to relent in the end. Nina was intended to become a main character in the unproduced sixth season of Angel, with Oz appearing as a recurring character and teaching her how to control her transformation.

In Angel: After the Fall, Nina provides humans and good demons sanctuary with the help of Connor and Gwen Raiden after Los Angeles was sent to hell by the Senior Partners. In the hellish Los Angeles, the sun and the moon are out at the same time; while the sun keeps Nina from transforming, the moonlight makes her more primal in her attitude and actions. Angel refers to her as his ex-girlfriend, revealing their relationship ended after "Power Play."

In the "Family Reunion" arc of Angel & Faith Gunn mentions that Nina has gotten married. Angel says that is good for her.

=== Numfar ===
Numfar, Lorne's brother, appears in "Through the Looking Glass" in season 2. Numfar has no lines, but performs a variety of dances. Numfar is a cameo appearance by Joss Whedon.

== O ==
=== Oracles ===
Two powerful beings that serve as a connection to the Powers That Be for Angel in Season One, albeit with the need to please them with gifts. The Oracles (Randall Slavin and Carey Cannon) first appear in the episode "I Will Remember You" where they turn back time and make Angel a vampire again after he was made human by a Mohra demon. They also appear two episodes later, at the start of Parting Gifts where Angel begs them to bring his recently deceased friend Doyle back. They make their last appearance in the Season One finale; their bodies are found by Angel after they have been slaughtered by a demon raised by Wolfram & Hart, the malevolent law firm, who seek to eliminate Angel's connections to the Powers. They are never mentioned again.

== P ==
=== Pee Pee Demon ===
Pee Pee Demon was the personal slave of Archduke Sebassis, played by Ryan Alvarez. A pale, emaciated demon led around on a leash, he had a cork in his wrist which was removed to pour blood into a glass for Sebassis to drink. He first appeared in "Life of the Party", attending the Wolfram & Hart Halloween party, where he earned his name by sniffing Gunn's urine and saying "Pee pee." He reappeared in "You're Welcome", where he frightened Cordelia and was revealed to have been living off photocopier toner in the meantime. His final appearance was in "Not Fade Away", in which he was murdered by Angel as part of a plan to assassinate Sebassis; Angel poisoned Pee Pee Demon and subsequently Sebassis through his blood. Pee Pee Demon was featured as IGN's "Obscure Character of the Day", where they claimed he "was a totally random and silly little part of the series, but, wow, was he unique."

=== Polyphemus ===
Polyphemus is a Monasterenser Magnaserm, a rock-like creature that functions as a living library for information on supernatural beings, introduced in Angel: The Crown Prince Syndrome. He is partnered with Laura Weathermill, and joins Angel Investigations when she does. Through him, James' true nature is revealed. Additionally, when Angel is revealed to have the power to regenerate lost limbs, Polyphemus reveals that this is due to a mystical upheaval that is changing the world both naturally and supernaturally. Polyphemus is fatally damaged saving Laura from one of James' demon minions. Anne Steele later names her half-demon son Polyphemus Darrow Steele in honour of him.

== R ==
=== Rondell ===
Charles Gunn's friend, and co-founder with Gunn of their old vampire-hunting crew. He appears in three episodes: "The Thin Dead Line", "Belonging", and "That Old Gang of Mine". Gunn also mentions him in "Not Fade Away". It is presumed that Rondell took over leadership of the crew once Gunn left. Rondell was played by Jarrod Crawford.

=== Rutherford Sirk ===
Rutherford Sirk (portrayed by Michael Halsey) is a former member of the Watchers' Council, Rutherford Sirk lacked the moral clarity of other Watchers of his generation and found himself doubting about the good fight and the council's mission, though he was far from the only Watcher corrupted by the knowledge he obtained at the council.

Tempted by power and ambition, Sirk joined Wolfram & Hart and took along with him several valuable tomes belonging to the council, including the Devandiré Sybilline Codex. Later when Angel Investigations was offered the L.A. branch of Wolfram & Hart in the episode "Home" (his first appearance), he was sent to the Los Angeles branch and was the one showing Wesley around their research and intelligence division. He received a punch in the face because of his attitude and because Wesley wanted to infiltrate the firm's files and records department.

He showed up once again, now part of Eve and Lindsey's plot against Angel in "Destiny". Sirk claimed to have translated the entire Shanshu Prophecy, sending Angel and Spike against each in the false quest for the Cup of Perpetual Torment, a fake relic filled with Mountain Dew, which was supposed to reveal the true champion of the prophecy. After his deception was discovered, Sirk fled from Wolfram & Hart and the Senior Partners. His current whereabouts and status are unknown.

Rutherford Sirk makes an appearance in the Buffyverse Expanded Universe (uncanon), in Book of the Dead. The novel reveals the extent of Rutherford's power within W&H, and the circumstances under which he left the Watchers' Council and joined the law firm.

== S ==
=== Sahjhan ===
Sahjhan is portrayed by actor Jack Conley. Sahjhan is one of a race of demons known as the Granok who thrive on chaos and violence. The Granok are pale and disfigured, with faces covered in scars and markings. Wolfram and Hart made Sahjhan and the rest of his kind immaterial. Mesekhtet (the little girl in the White Room) claims this was because she liked trouble, but hated the chaos the Granok were bringing. Once an immaterial being, however, Sahjhan became capable of teleporting through time and dimensions, earning him the nickname Timeshifter. Despite his capability of time travel, Sahjhan is unable to learn details of his own future, thus can only rely on prophecies of his own fate, which provide little information of what he seeks. Sahjhan claims to have invented daylight saving time, although he has a tendency towards sarcasm and dry wit. Sahjhan is responsible for bringing vampire hunter Daniel Holtz to the present. Sahjhan claims to have a grudge against both Angelus and his sire Darla; however, it is later revealed that, being a time traveler, Sahjhan is aware that Angelus would become the benevolent champion Angel after his soul is restored and Darla also would become the mother of his son Connor. His plan is, in fact, to use Holtz to kill Connor because of the prophecies in the Nyazian Scrolls, which foretell the vampires' son killing him, hence his hatred towards them. In order to confuse Angel and his friends, Sahjhan alters the passage in the prophecy about his death; the passage now reads "The Father Will Kill the Son", leading Wesley to the conclusion Angel will kill Connor.

However, Sahjhan grows impatient with Holtz, who, instead of just killing Connor, lays out and executes an elaborate plan to kidnap Angel's son. Sahjhan seeks the help of Wolfram & Hart's Lilah Morgan, thus setting up a chain of events that ends with Holtz disappearing into a Hell dimension known as Quor-Toth, taking Connor with him. Sometime later, Angel uses a spell to re-incorporate Sahjhan, determined to kill him out of revenge for Connor's disappearance, only to end up being nearly killed by him. Later, Justine imprisons Sahjhan in Holtz's Resikhian Urn as revenge for Holtz's disappearance, which she blames on Sahjhan. However, Angel still thirsts for revenge and waits for the right opportunity. Prior to his imprisonment, Sahjhan reveals to Angel that the prophecy also foretells that Connor is destined to follow in his father's footsteps as a champion.

Two years later, Sahjhan is released under the watch of his enemy Cyvus Vail, whom Sahjhan had tried to kill on a number of occasions. Despite wanting to kill Sahjhan himself, Angel reluctantly agrees to let Connor face the demon. Minutes later, after Sahjhan reveals that he is directly responsible of sending Connor to Quor-Toth, he is killed by Connor, and thus the prophecy of the Nyazian Scrolls is finally fulfilled after all his efforts to prevent it. Sahjhan's actions, which under a causal loop of both the Nyazian Scrolls and his own time travels, ironically led to a chain of events causing his own death: by sending Connor to Quor-Toth with Holtz, he inadvertently provided Connor the motive and allowed Holtz to train him into an extremely skilled fighter (in which Angel had no intention of training his son someday to be a warrior), so that he would get his revenge and thereby fulfill his destiny.

=== Sam Lawson ===
Sam Lawson (Eyal Podell) is a vampire from Angel's past. As revealed in the episode "Why We Fight", Lawson is the only vampire Angel sired after regaining his soul in 1898.

Lawson was an engineer on a submarine that captured a Nazi team and its prisoners – three vampires. The vampires – Spike, the Prince of Lies, and Nostroyev, a Russian vampire – had escaped when Lawson's submarine sank, and killed most of Lawson's crew. Angel is sent to rescue the men and their prisoners. During the encounter, Lawson – the only one who can restore the submarine to working condition – is mortally wounded; to save the submarine, Angel makes him a vampire. Angel then lets Lawson go, telling him that he would kill him the next time they saw each other.

Sixty years later, Lawson finds Angel at Wolfram & Hart and takes Gunn, Fred, and Wesley prisoner as he recounts the tale of his encounter with Angel. He also tells Angel that he killed and caused chaos like a typical vampire, but had no emotions about his actions. Lawson questioned Angel if his turning Lawson into a vampire after he had a soul was the reason for Lawson's emotional state and if he had a soul, although Angel did not believe Lawson did, but is not sure. Threatening their lives, Lawson forces Angel into a fight and Angel reluctantly kills Lawson as Lawson asks 'for a mission'. Angel surmised that Lawson was simply looking for a reason to die and thus wanted peace from his tormented existence based from his own experiences.

=== Senator Helen Brucker ===
Senator Helen Brucker (Stacey Travis) is not a real human being, but a demon "installed" in a woman's body; the circumstances behind this are unknown, but the process apparently altered her body chemistry to the extent that her host's blood was green. Her ambition is to become President of the United States in 2008 thanks to the financial aid of hostile countries and the vast influence she possesses as a member of the Circle of the Black Thorn. She also tends to surround herself with vampires, who work both as her bodyguards and campaign staff. She is also a client of Wolfram & Hart, at least since the days of Holland Manners.

Senator Brucker visits Wolfram & Hart to obtain the firm's help to defeat her rival Mike Conley, also a candidate for the Senate. She plans to have Conley brainwashed into becoming a pedophile so Brucker can win the 'chick vote'. As part of the act he stages to make the Black Thorn believe he has been corrupted by power, Angel agrees to aid Senator Brucker and to have Conley brainwashed in the following days.

Brucker is present at Angel's initiation in the Circle of the Black Thorn, participating in the torture of Drogyn. Before revealing herself to Angel, she wore a bronze-colored Tre Facce mask. When Angel and his crew agree to wipe out all members of the Black Thorn, Gunn is sent to kill Senator Brucker at her campaign headquarters, a mission in which he succeeds. He kills her by throwing an axe into her head.

=== Skip ===
Skip (portrayed by David Denman) is a formidable and powerful demon, whose body is plated in armor. He appears in four episodes of the series, and at first appears to have a friendly demeanor. The demon sports a confident, charismatic personality and frequently makes humorous references to human popular culture and turn-of-phrase, claiming to have watched and loved The Matrix but not loved Gladiator. The history and nature of Skip is largely unknown since much of what Skip says is later revealed to be a lie. Skip is revealed to be a servant of Jasmine who is used to trick Cordelia Chase into becoming a vessel for the possession and birth of Jasmine.

Skip is first seen in the season 3 episode "That Vision Thing". Angel is forced to rescue an evil man named Billy Blim from torment in a demon dimension in order to save Cordelia's life. Skip guards and controls Billy's prison of fire, even being able to make Billy's screams inaudible so he doesn't have to hear them. When Angel first enters this dimension, he and Skip have a very pleasant conversation where Skip claims he works for The Powers That Be. Skip's pleasant demeanor (juxtaposed with his intimidating appearance) is a surprise for Angel, who has to fight him anyway. Angel wins, and is able to trade Billy for Cordelia's life. Later, Skip claims he threw this fight.

Because of the popularity of his character in his first appearance Skip was brought back in the episode "Birthday" where he informs Cordelia she will die if she continues receiving visions from the Powers. He serves as Cordelia's guide through a "what-if" scenario where she had never inherited her visions and had become a celebrity. After realizing that fighting evil is her true calling, Cordelia asks to keep her visions. Skip offers to make her part-demon so she can continue to bear the visions and Cordelia agrees.

In the season three finale, Skip once again returns to Cordelia, this time to say she has been chosen to ascend to a higher realm and become a higher being. Cordelia agrees and ascends to become all seeing but is unable to act and becomes very bored.

After Cordelia returns and appears to have become evil, Angel and the remainder of the group realize something bad had happened to Cordelia on the higher realm. Angel seeks out Skip for an explanation. In the episode "Inside Out", Angel once again enters Skip's dimension and questions him about Cordelia's changes. Skip feigns ignorance, but Angel realizes Skip is hiding something, and a fight ensues. During the fight, Angel is able to defeat Skip by using a length of heavy chain, shearing off a small projection of his armor near his ear in the process. Angel then brings Skip back to Los Angeles where he is bound to this dimension and questioned. Skip reveals he is part of a conspiracy to bring Jasmine into the world. He also claims most of the important plot points of the entire series were directed by Jasmine (though he does not mention her by name), including tricking Cordelia into becoming part-demon and her ascension. How much of Skip's story is true is unknown as much of it contradicts previous and later events. Skip also reveals killing Cordelia is the only way to stop Jasmine's birth. Able to escape thanks to an earthquake that breaks the containment spell, he engages the members of Angel's team, but is killed when Wesley (performing an acrobatic jump using two guns) shoots a bullet in the exact place where Angel earlier broke his armor. His last words were an amazed, "Well, that ain't right." Later on, Gunn and Wesley dismember his corpse with a buzz saw in the basement of the Hyperion Hotel.

The character of Skip is a tribute to Skip Schoolnik, a producer and director for Buffy and Angel. Schoolnik is credited as co-producer on a number of episodes, including "That Vision Thing", the episode that introduced the character. Schoolnik directed 5 episodes for Angel including "Habeas Corpses", "Slouching Toward Bethlehem", "Destiny", "Quickening", and "Underneath".

Whedon has hinted that Skip is aesthetically his favorite demon on the show, promising demons will be more cool-looking, but not as cool as Skip, in the canonical Buffy the Vampire Slayer Season Eight comic series. In the canonical Angel continuation, Angel: After the Fall a female of Skip's species appears in issue No. 4, referred to as a "She-Skip" by Lorne.

== T ==
=== Transuding Furies ===
The Transuding Furies (Heidi Marnhout, An Le, Madison Gray) are three sisters possessing magical abilities who can cast a spell to prevent any form of violence committed by both demons and humans. Whether this is the extent of their magical abilities is unconfirmed. Very dreamy and spacey, not to mention sensuous, they float a few feet above the ground and finish each other's sentences or talk in unison with their melodious voices.

In the third-season episode "That Old Gang of Mine", Cordelia goes to them to lift the spell they have put on Lorne's Club Caritas. They agree to do it for a price, one only Angel is "equipped" to pay. This becomes a running theme with them, as every time Angel is mentioned or when he walks into a room they are in they moan in unison "Mmmm, Angel". They return again later that season in the episode "Offspring" to re-cast the spell on Caritas (this time banning human violence as well as demon violence) so Lorne can re-open it.

Their last off-screen appearance is in the fourth season episode "Release", telling Lorne how to cast the sanctuary spell over the hotel to ensure Angelus doesn't return and hurt anyone.

=== Trevor Lockley ===
Trevor Lockley, played by John Mahon, was a retired police officer and the father of Kate Lockley. He first appeared in "Sense & Sensitivity" (season 1), which featured his retirement party. Kate, unknowingly under a spell making her and every cop in her precinct highly sensitive, gave a speech about how distant and unloved he had made her feel as a child. He wrote this off as just her being drunk.

He would later appear working for a drug-pushing demon. When Angel began looking into this, the demon sent two vampires after Trevor, and they killed him despite knowing that Angel would instantly kill them in revenge (Angel was immediately outside Trevor's apartment when he was killed, but Trevor did not invite him in, so could not enter so long as Trevor was alive).

This would start Kate's dislike/hatred of supernatural beings, especially vampires, as well as her hostility towards Angel, which would stay until "Epiphany".

== V ==
=== Virginia Bryce ===
Wesley's girlfriend, played by Brigid Brannagh. Virginia was introduced in "Guise Will Be Guise". Her father was a wealthy businessman who wanted to hire Angel to protect his daughter. Wesley impersonated Angel, who was visiting a shaman, and took the job. The family money actually came from wizardry. Virginia and Wesley grew very close while he was impersonating Angel, even sleeping together. After learning he was not Angel, Mr. Bryce fired Wesley.

When it was learned Virginia's father planned to sacrifice her to the demon Yiska on his 50th birthday, Wesley and company stormed the party. She asked why he came back, to which Wesley replied he had promised to protect her. Yiska refused her as a sacrifice as she was "impure", or not a virgin. This shocked and dumbfounded her father, who thought he had kept her away from all men; indeed, this was why he had attempted to hire Angel, misunderstanding his curse and believing him to be a eunuch (an assessment that greatly offended Angel). Virginia smugly revealed that she had not been a virgin for a very long time; she apparently lost her virginity to her father's chauffeur at the age of sixteen, and had two lovers since that time. After this, she punched her father for trying to kill her.

She dated Wesley for a while before realizing how dangerous his job truly was and couldn't stand the fear of him getting hurt, and left shortly after.

== See also ==
- List of Angel characters
- List of Buffy the Vampire Slayer characters
