= Smile Time =

- Angel episode
- Puppet Angel
- Episode no.: Season 5 Episode 14
- Directed by: Ben Edlund
- Story by: Ben Edlund; Joss Whedon
- Teleplay by: Ben Edlund
- Production code: 5ADH14
- Original air date: February 18, 2004

Guest appearances
- Mercedes McNab as Harmony Kendall; Jonathan M. Woodward as Knox; Jenny Mollen as Nina Ash; Marc Vann as Dr. Sparrow; David Fury as Gregor Framkin; Ridge Canipe as Tommy; Jenny Vaughn Campbell as Tommy's Mother; Abigail Mavity as Hannah

Episode chronology
← Previous "Why We Fight"	Next → "A Hole in the World"
- Angel season 5

"Smile Time" is the 14th episode of the fifth season of the American television series Angel. Written and directed by Ben Edlund, with story by series creator Joss Whedon, it was originally broadcast on February 18, 2004, on the WB network. It was nominated for and won several honors and spawned its own toy line.

In "Smile Time", Angel goes to the studio of a popular show after learning they are stealing the life forces of children, where he triggers a spell that transforms him into a puppet. While Angel and company try to reverse the spell and save the lives of hundreds of children, werewolf Nina declares her romantic intentions towards Angel and Gunn discovers his given knowledge of the law leaving his mind.

== Plot ==
As a little boy watches a TV show called Smile Time, featuring puppets singing songs about learning, one of the puppets, Polo, tells the boy to put his hands on the TV. The boy's mother enters the room, horrified to see that the life has been drained out of the boy and his face is frozen in a rictus smile. In the science lab at Wolfram & Hart, Knox brings Fred files on children who have been hospitalized in the same condition as the little boy. Knox also gives Fred a valentine and tries to get her to discuss their potential relationship, but she gently declines his advances. When Harmony tells Gunn he filed the wrong papers, he tries to hide how worried he is about his mistake. Werewolf Nina arrives for her three nights of the full moon in the firm. She flirts with Angel as he leads her to her cell, and, uncomfortable, Angel leaves. He heads to Wesley's office, saying he is not sure how he feels about their platonic friendship turning into something else. When Angel says that he is worried about turning back into evil, soulless Angelus after achieving pure happiness with Nina, Wesley says most people have to settle for acceptable happiness, and there is no reason Angel cannot do the same.

Fred arrives with the new case. Angel notes that all of the kids were watching TV when they became ill and Lorne says Smile Time is on at that time and in "the right demographic". Meanwhile, Fred goes to see Wesley and tells him that she needs a ride home and is clearly hoping he will offer. Unfortunately, Wesley misses the signals, and he instead arranges for a driver to take Fred home. Angel heads to Smile Time's studio and enters a hidden room where a man with a towel over his head sits under a large egg. The egg opens, forming a glowing smile, and a blast of energy tosses Angel across the room, turning him into a sentient puppet.

When Puppet Angel explains to the group what happened, Fred tells the lab to start recording Smile Time so she can analyze it. Angel orders Lorne and Gunn to talk to the show's creator, Gregor Framkin, at the studio. Nina arrives, and Puppet Angel ducks under his desk so she will not see him. She tries to ask him if everything is okay, but he abruptly tells her to leave. Spike arrives and is shocked and amused to see that Angel is a puppet man. Puppet Angel gets angry and lunges at Spike. The two fight, crashing through the office doors into the lobby for all to see Angel as a puppet. The fight continues into the elevator, the doors of which close, and when the doors open Puppet Angel has managed to beat Spike.

Gunn and Lorne meet with Framkin at the studio. Gunn tries to tell him the laws he has violated, but he cannot come up with the right statute, and Framkin says he thinks he would be more likely to win than Wolfram & Hart in court. After Gunn and Lorne leave, it turns out that Framkin has a hole in his back and is being controlled by Polo. Framkin collapses as Polo pulls his arm out of a hole in Framkin's back and summons the other puppets - Groofus the dog, Flora, and Ratio Hornblower - with the news that Angel messed with the "nest egg". Flora suggests that they remove the zombifying spell on some of the employees so that they can see future intruders, but Polo announces that since their "system" has now been perfected, they will drain the life from all of their viewers the next day, instead of one kid at a time.

Back at Wolfram & Hart, Nina is preparing for her second werewolf night when Puppet Angel pays her a visit to apologize for the way he treated her earlier, shocking her with his puppet appearance. She tells him that he should not care what people think of him, since he is a hero. Puppet Angel turns away starting to say how hard it has been to be a hero—when Nina suddenly wolfs out and attacks him from her cage. Gunn heads to the medical wing to see Dr. Sparrow, explaining that he is losing his law knowledge. Sparrow tells him that the implant is failing in an "Acute Flowers For Algernon Syndrome"; the Senior Partners gave it to him because they wanted him to have it, and if it is fading, they must have wanted that as well. Gunn is unwilling to go back to the person he was, so Sparrow offers to give him a "permanent upgrade" if Gunn signs a contract to ship something out of customs for him. In the science lab, Fred and Wesley are watching Smile Time, where Knox brings Fred coffee, but she orders him to go home. After he leaves, Fred confesses that she decided Knox was not right for her and tries to tell Wesley that she has developed feelings for him; however, he does not get the message. Suddenly, while the sound of the show is muted, Wesley notices Polo seems to be talking to the audience.

Puppet Angel's "vamp face."

Puppet Angel is trying to sew himself up in his office when Wesley and Fred arrive to tell him the puppets' singing acts as a cloaking device, allowing Polo to address the children directly. Wesley says the "nest egg" holds the life forces of the kids, so if they can break the magic on it, they will save the kids and turn Angel human again. Gunn, who has regained his law knowledge, announces the puppets are running the show - Framkin made a deal with some devils to improve his ratings. Elsewhere in L.A., a little girl watches Smile Time and gets the message from Polo that all of the kids in the audience should put their hands on the TV.

Puppet Angel and the gang interrupt and the fighting begins, with Gunn decapitating Groofus the dog and subsequently fighting the female puppet Flora while Angel goes puppet-to-puppet with Polo. Fred and Wesley rush to the "Don't" room with the nest egg, where Ratio fights Wesley while Fred reads the spell to break the spell around nest egg, destroying the egg and saving the kids after Wesley defeats Ratio. In the main studio, Gunn defeats Flora and Angel defeats Polo. The next day, Nina wakes up in her cage with fabric around her and fears she ate Puppet Angel, until he comes in to tell her he is okay and will be back to normal in a few days. They agree to have breakfast together.

In Wesley's office, Fred tries to tell him she has been trying to subtly indicate her interest. She grabs him and kisses him; he happily returns the favor as the puppets sing their self-esteem song again.

== Acting ==
After reading the script, in which it was clear that Knox and Fred were not going to be falling in love, Jonathan Woodward says he was "very sad but I think it was nice, because it took Knox from all of the ways you thought Knox would be." He had tried to predict the character's arc, he says, but "they picked the one I couldn't even think of. You know something is going to happen but they pick the thing you know nobody had been able to figure out."

Framkin, the puppeteer of "Smile Time," is played by David Fury, who is a producer on the show.

James Marsters confessed that "the puppeteers were so good that it was easy to believe that Angel was actually trying to kick my butt. I blew takes by laughing too much, actually."

Several puppeteers from The Jim Henson Company were involved in the episode, including Alice Dinnean-Vernon, Leslie Carrara, Victor Yerrid, Julianne Buescher, Tim Blaney, and Drew Massey.

== Production details ==
This was the first episode of Angel to be aired after The WB announced that the series would not be renewed for another season.

Producer David Fury says the writers talked about doing an evil Sesame Street show before Season Five aired, but "it wasn't until Joss came around going, 'I figured out how to do it - Angel gets turned into a Muppet,' that we kind of went, 'Hallelujah, that's brilliant.'"

== Reception ==
This episode was nominated for a 2005 Hugo Award in the category of "Best Dramatic Presentation, Short Form", and was rated the series' second-best episode in a poll done by Angel Magazine. The BBC agreed, adding "it's surely one of Angel's most inspired and laugh-out-loud episodes. How such an innovative show can be canceled after producing something like 'Smile Time' is baffling."

In their "Year in Review", MSNBC singled out this episode for the tongue-in-cheek "Best appearance by a guest puppet" award, saying it managed to "send up not only children’s TV but the Angel series itself." Writer Peter David was impressed that "they seemed to anticipate every single fan reaction" - for example, Knox's suggestion that the Joker was responsible for the children's illness. "Even more savvy," David writes, "there was rumbling before the episode even aired that this was a 'Jumping the shark' installment. Foreseeing that, there's a line bitching about how lousy the last several seasons of Happy Days was, the show from which the (frankly by now overused) phrase originated."

The Futon Critic named it the 21st best episode 2004, simply stating "They made Angel a puppet. A puppet. Nothing more needs to be said."

An Angel guidebook noted that the opening scene "sounds completely perverse, as though the puppets are pedophiles. A child is watching TV, then you hear 'Get over here and touch it' [followed by] loud, sexual groaning noises."

Inspired by the concept of Smile Time, IDW Publishing released a comic called "Spike: Shadow Puppets". Spike travels to Japan, where Smile Time is still the second biggest kids' show and is transformed into a puppet. Diamond Select Toys created a plush doll for Puppet Angel; after rapidly selling their entire production run of 5,000 pieces they produced a second and a third Angel puppet replica, followed by Puppet Spike.

The concept of Angel being turned into a puppet is revisited in IDW's "Angel: After the Fall", where Angel is briefly transformed into a puppet due to Illyria's newly regained time manipulation powers. IDW will also release a 3-issue limited series adaptation of "Smile Time".
