= Sara Pichelli =

Italian comics artist (born 1983)

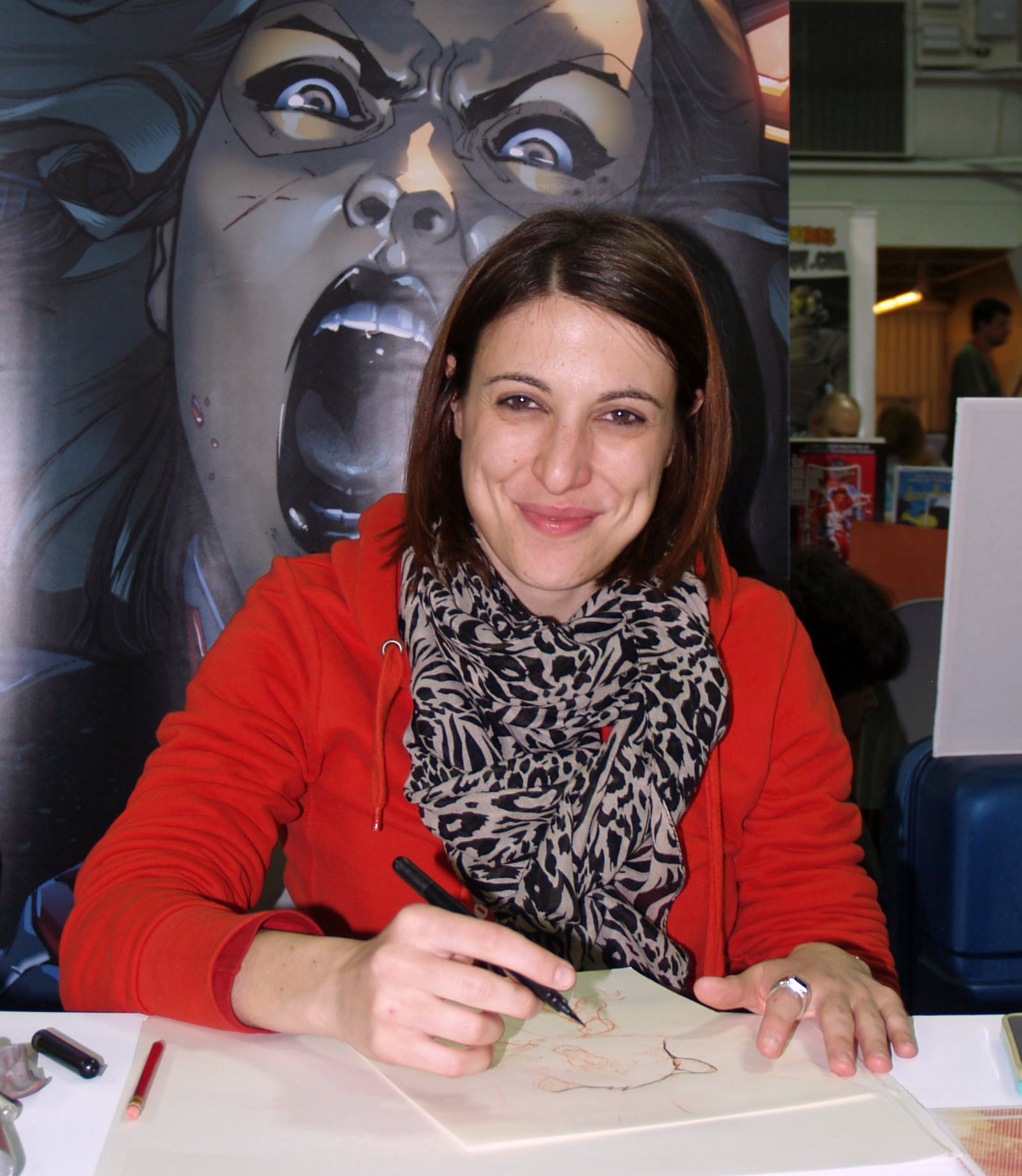
- Pichelli at Special Edition NYC in Manhattan, 2014
- Born: 15 April 1983 (age 43) Porto Sant'Elpidio, Italy
- Notable works: Runaways, X-Men: Pixie Strikes Back, Ultimate Comics: Spider-Man, Guardians of the Galaxy vol. 3,
- Awards: 2011 Eagle Awards for Favorite Newcomer Artist

Sara Pichelli (born 15 April 1983) is an Italian comics artist best known for co-creating and first illustrating the Miles Morales version of Ultimate Spider-Man. She started her career in animation and entered the comic book industry working for IDW Publishing before joining Marvel Comics in 2008 after being discovered in an international talent search. Pichelli worked on several Marvel titles, such as Namora and was then hired as the main artist on the second volume of Ultimate Comics: Spider-Man, which premiered in September 2011. Pichelli won a 2011 Eagle Awards for Favorite Newcomer Artist.

== Career ==
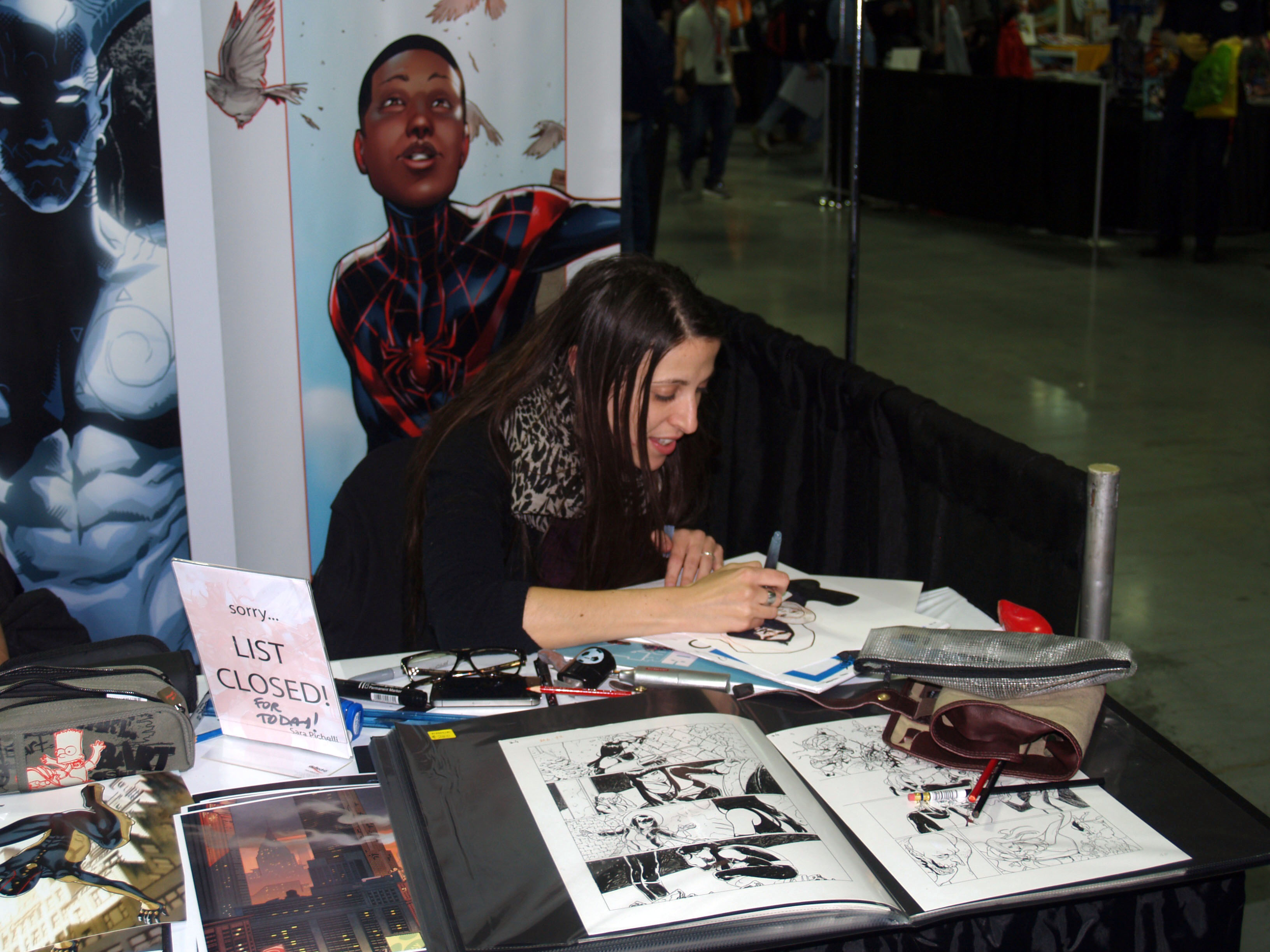
Pichelli sketching at the New York Comic Con

Pichelli was born in Porto Sant'Elpidio, Italy. She began her career in animation, working as a storyboard artist, animator and character designer. She said of this work, "It wasn't really for me. I felt like a tiny cog in a machine." She started working in the comic book industry after meeting comics artist David Messina. Prior to that, she was not particularly interested in comics and preferred animated films and anime. She worked as a layout assistant for Messina and worked on such titles as the Star Trek comic book series produced by IDW Publishing, including such editions as Star Trek: Countdown and Star Trek: Nero. In 2008 she submitted her work to the Chesterquest international talent search and was named one of the finalists by Marvel Comics editor C. B. Cebulski, which led to her working for Marvel. She illustrates for Marvel from her home in Rome.

Pichelli started working for Marvel Comics in 2008 with the limited series NYX: No Way Home, followed by a brief run on Runaways with writer Kathryn Immonen in 2009. She worked with Immonen again on the X-Men: Pixie Strikes Back limited series, released in December 2009, which focused on the X-Men character Pixie. Pichelli provided art for one storyline in the I Am An Avenger anthology series, which ran from 2010 to 2011, then joined the team working on Ultimate Comics: Spider-Man starting with the October 2010 issue #15. After that series ended, Pichelli contributed to the 2011 limited series Ultimate Fallout, where she illustrated the first image of the Spider-Man character as portrayed by Miles Morales in the Ultimate Marvel universe. Pichelli took on regular art duties on the relaunched Ultimate Comics: Spider-Man with Morales as the protagonist, starting in September 2011.

In August 2018, Pichelli and writer Dan Slott launched a new Fantastic Four series.

== Technique and materials ==
Pichelli uses a Cintiq 12wx graphic tablet. When illustrating Ultimate Comics: Spider-Man, she added more screentones to her illustrations to give what she called "a more 'pop' feeling to the book", as she believed it would be more fitting to that series.

In creating the visual look of characters, Pichelli approaches the design by giving thought to the characters' personalities, including the background that may have influenced them, and the distinctive traits that the characters exhibit, such as the clothing they wear, their body language and expressions. She followed this approach when creating Miles Morales.

== Reception ==
There are three or four artists we've got at Marvel who are really starting to pop and sizzle and define a new look and style that's distinctly their own. We look at these people as being the next generation of Marvel superstars, and I think Sara is clearly one of them. Her stuff is bubbly and fun and alive and energetic and exciting. It has all the best traits and qualities of humanity and engagingness [that] I'd want in a Marvel artist.

— Tom Brevoort

Pichelli won a 2011 Eagle Award for Favorite Newcomer Artist, over fellow nominees Rafael Albuquerque, Fiona Staples, Sean Murphy and Bryan Lee O'Malley. Marvel Comics senior editor Mark Paniccia said of Pichelli: "Every time I see new pages from Sara she continues to grow as an artist. She's amazing now and I can't imagine where she'll be a year from now." Marvel Comics editor Tom Brevoort called her "a real breakout talent" and "a top talent primed to explode in a major way". David Brothers of ComicsAlliance praised her attention to detail and said he particularly likes the way Pichelli draws hair, facial expressions and body language: "The first two add a lot to the atmosphere of the comics she draws, and the third cranks her storytelling up to another level." IGN writer Jesse Schedeen called Pichelli's art in Ultimate Fallout "energetic, cinematic, and just flamboyant enough to offer a change of pace from the rest of the Ultimate Fallout stories".

== Personal life ==
Pichelli lives in Rome, Italy.

== Bibliography ==
- All-New X-Men #30 (2014)
- The Amazing Spider-Man #77–78, 91–93 (with Jim Towe, Fran Galán and José Carlos Silva) (2021–2022)
- Astonishing X-Men vol. 3, #37 (with Jason Pearson) (2011)
- I Am An Avenger #4 (with Mike Mayhew, Colleen Coover and Lucy Knisley) (2011)
- Eternals vol. 4, #8 (with Eric Nguyen) (2009)
- Girl Comics vol. 2, #3 (with June Brigman, Lea Hernandez, Molly Crabapple, Adriana Melo, Carla Speed McNeil) (2010)
- Guardians of the Galaxy vol. 3, #4–7, 11–13 (2013–2014)
- Marvel Digital Holiday Special #2 (with Nick Dragotta and Sanford Greene) (2009)
- Namora, one-shot (2010)
- Origins of Marvel Comics: X-Men, one-shot (with other artists) (2010)
- Runaways vol. 3, #10–14 (2009)
- Spider-Man #1–5, 11–14 (2016)
- Spider-Men #1–5 (miniseries) (2012)
- Ultimate Comics Fallout #4 (with Salvador Larroca and Clayton Crain) (2011)
- Ultimate Comics All-New Spider-Man #1–5, 8, 19–22 (2011–2013)
- Ultimate Comics Spider-Man #15 (2010)
- Ultimate Spider-Man #150–154, 200 (2011–2014)
- X-Men: Manifest Destiny #5 (with Michael Ryan, Ben Oliver) (2009)
- X-Men: Pixie Strikes Back #1–4 (miniseries) (2010)
