= Twilight (Buffy comic) =

Story arc of the Buffy the Vampire Slayer comics

- Cover of Buffy the Vampire Slayer Season Eight: Twilight trade paperback collected edition Art by Jo Chen
- Publisher: Dark Horse Comics
- Publication date: February – May 2010
- Genre: Action/adventure, horror; Based on Buffy the Vampire Slayer; Vampire
- Title(s): Buffy the Vampire Slayer Season Eight #31–35
- Main character(s): Buffy Summers; Angel

Creative team
- Writer: Brad Meltzer
- Penciller: Georges Jeanty
- Inker: Andy Owens
- Colorist: Dave Stewart
- Editor: Scott Allie

With respect to the Buffy the Vampire Slayer franchise
- The material covered in this article is a continuity issue in the canon of Buffy the Vampire Slayer.

"Twilight" is the seventh story arc of the Buffy the Vampire Slayer Season Eight series of comic books, based upon the television series of the same name, and is written by novelist and comic book writer Brad Meltzer. The story follows Buffy's warfare with recurring villain Twilight, and features Buffy taking on Twilight mano y mano following her development of powers similar to his. Part II, notably, reveals the identity of Twilight after months of speculation; this revelation was leaked early due to cover solicitations, leading to much early controversy and speculation, as well as damage control from showrunner Joss Whedon and Dark Horse Comics editor Scott Allie.

== Plot ==
Buffy tests the extent of her new superpowers when she is confronted by Twilight, who reveals himself to be her ex-boyfriend Angel. Their battle continues in mid-air for some time. He explains that the Twilight identity was the only way to limit the extent of the anti-Slayer factions' damage, and that the masked identity gave Buffy somewhere to focus her energies. Overcome by a strange glow, Angel begins to explain to Buffy that they are part of a cosmic destiny. Buffy succumbs to her passion and she and Angel begin to have sex, at first mid-air and later through space, eventually arriving in a paradise-like dimension which Angel announced is "Twilight".

Giles explains to Willow, Xander, Dawn et al. a myth about the Slayer that, in short, ultimately means that Buffy and Angel are destiny's vehicles in bringing the old universe to a close and beginning a new one. Demons, afterbirth of the new dimension, begin to flood the old world. Andrew uses a combination Captain America and Iron Man armor to defend himself; he and Warren squabble, with Andrew taking a serious blow from a demon. Despite the prospect of eternal happiness with Angel in the paradise dimension, Buffy questions the new reality after observing the situation her friends are in. She decides to return to earth to assist her friends in fighting the unleashed demons, with Angel opting to assist her. Even with Buffy and Angel's superpowers, the demons are hard to overcome. At the close of the arc, a spherical yellow ship arrives, from which Spike emerges, promising a solution to the crisis.

== Cultural references ==
Part I features many homages to comic book superheroes, notably DC Comics' Superman, as Buffy and Xander attempt to test the extent of Buffy's powers, testing them against the popular Superman phrase, "faster than a speeding bullet, more powerful than a locomotive, and able to leap tall buildings in a single bound". In Part II, Andrew attacks Twilight with a suit of armour incorporating many facets of popular DC and Marvel Comics superheroes.

Early in the series, Joss Whedon was unaware of the coincidence of naming Season Eight's villain Twilight, which shares its name with the series of supernatural romance novels written by Stephenie Meyer. In Part II, while fighting, Buffy comments on the choice of name, remarking she's "lived that whole thing", and that "her vampire" was much better. This is a comment on the perceived indebtedness of Meyer's Twilight, which is primarily a romance between a teenage girl and a good-natured vampire, to Whedon's Buffy.

== Spoiler leak ==
Twilight's identity was not revealed in the comic itself, but rather via comic book cover solicitations and subsequent interviews with Comic Book Resources. Prior to the release, Season Eight artist Georges Jeanty had mocked up a spoof cover depicting the revelation that Twilight was US President Barack Obama. Due to the April solicitations releasing covers by Jo Chen and Georges Jeanty which clearly show Twilight to be Angel, and of actor David Boreanaz' likeness, Scott Allie was interviewed by Comic Book Resources. Allie stated that he had known of Twilight's true identity "from the get-go" and had struggled to keep it a secret all this time; four years ago, Whedon wrote out a "Buffy Manifesto" which included the identity of Twilight which was circulated under strictest confidence to Dark Horse editorial and the various comic and TV writers who would be contributing to the series.

Allie also spoke to Chris Ryall, editor of IDW Publishing, to assure and "make clear" to him that their parallel narratives would "jibe", so as to prevent "some big conflict with IDW continuity". Allie also stresses that for readers, the big reveal should not be who Twilight is, but rather why Angel is Twilight and how Buffy will react to this, commenting:

'The Big Bad' is a phrase that originated from Joss in 'Buffy' – this idea that in a season you might have a whole lot of people to fight, but there's one Big Bad, one major villain that you have to defeat at the end. But this is not like that. Right now it feels to everybody on the outside like, 'Oh, the cat's out of the bag! Twilight is Angel!' but the question [of how the end game rolls out that] all the fans are asking is not really the right question. If this was any other book and Twilight was any other villain, that would be the question to ask. But the question right now is 'How does Buffy react to the fact that Twilight is Angel?' It's not as simple anymore as 'Now we've got to deal with the bad guy.' 'It's all about relationships.' I remembered that, and it's been a guiding principal [sic] in my career. That line jumped back at me this morning thinking about this spoiler being out there. Because it is all about relationships – if it was any other villain, it'd just be a question of who kills who, but it's a much bigger question than that. Who's going to ally themselves with Angel and Twilight? There are still some big surprises in store. It's not as clear as it appears to be with those covers slipped out.

— Scott Allie on storytelling and the Twilight reveal.

The reveal led to the trending of the #twilightisangel hashtag on the popular microblogging site Twitter. Subsequently, Dark Horse Comics posted on their Twitter, "Readers, we mean not to offend you. Knowing what you do will not spoil the great ending of Joss's Season 8. Trust us." IDW editor Chris Ryall posted a related teaser poster for the upcoming Spike ongoing, a spin-off from the Angel series which will focus on the heroic vampire Spike. The image, drawn by artist Franco Urru, is in the format of a comic book cover headed "Spike", and depicts Spike burning Twilight's mask with the tagline "He definitely isn't Twilight." Brian Lynch, writer of IDW Publishing's own canonical Angel: After the Fall and an upcoming Spike series came up with the idea on the night of the announcement. Franco drew it to completion the very next day, and it posted to Chris Ryall's blog shortly after.

== IDW Publishing response ==
While Lynch, Urru and Ryall seem to support Whedon's move, Angel writer Bill Willingham took offence with Allie's comments, which he interpreted as Allie and Whedon "taking credit" for his work on the ongoing series. Willingham stated "I am not coordinating, nor have I ever coordinated stories with Scott Allie, Joss Whedon, nor anyone else at Dark Horse Comics ... as long as I am writing the Angel series for IDW, I will not be coordinating stories with any Dark Horse comic, period." Previously, Urru and Lynch's 17-issue After the Fall series for IDW had been considered canonical due to Whedon's involvement. Whedon later clarified by stating that the Dark Horse Buffy storyline took place, by internal chronology, after the resolution of the still-ongoing IDW Angel storyline.

Later, to make it up to IDW, Whedon and Allie granted permission to use Willow (IDW only has rights to Angel characters) in Lynch's ongoing series, Spike. However, Whedon requested oversight of the character's actions within the Spike series. Consequently, this leads to a bridging between the continuities of the Dark Horse Buffy series and the IDW Angel and Spike series (of ambiguous continuity) because the first arc of the Spike series acts as a prequel to the Twilight and Last Gleaming arcs of Season Eight.

Preceded by "Retreat"/"Turbulence"	Buffy the Vampire Slayer Season Eight storylines 2010	Succeeded by "Last Gleaming"
