= Angel: After the Fall =

Comic book continuation of Angel the series

- Cover of Angel: After the Fall #1. Art by Tony Harris.

Publication information
- Publisher: IDW Publishing
- Schedule: Monthly
- Format: Limited series (#1–17); Spin-off ongoing series (#18–44)
- Publication date: November 2007 – April 2011
- No. of issues: 44
- Main character: Angel Investigations

Creative team
- Created by: Joss Whedon
- Written by: Brian Lynch with Joss Whedon (#1–17); Kelley Armstrong (#18–22); Brian Lynch (#23–27); Bill Willingham (#28–38); David Tischman and Mariah Huehner (#39–44)
- Penciller(s): Franco Urru (#1–5, 15–17, 23–25); Nick Runge (#9–12); Stephen Mooney (#12–14, 26–27); Dave Ross (#18–22); Brian Denham (#28–32); Elena Casagrande (#33–44)

Collected editions
- Hardcover, Volume 1: ISBN 1-60010-181-X

Angel: After the Fall is a forty-four-issue comic book published by IDW Publishing. Written by Brian Lynch and plotted with Joss Whedon, the series is a canonical continuation of the Angel television series, and follows the events of that show's final season. Angel: After the Fall was prompted by IDW Publishing and Joss Whedon after the success of Dark Horse Comics' Buffy the Vampire Slayer Season Eight which is the official comic continuation of Angel's mothershow, Buffy the Vampire Slayer. Angel: After the Fall sees the heroic vampire, Angel, coping with the apocalyptic aftermath of the television series after he took over and subsequently betrayed the demonic law firm, Wolfram & Hart. The city of Los Angeles has since been sent to hell by Wolfram & Hart as a result of Angel's actions. The series follows his attempts to rescue the people he has sworn to protect. The first issue was released on November 21, 2007.

Originally intended as a 12-issue limited series, After the Fall expanded into a 17-issue Angel series. After the Fall was then followed by an ongoing series, with rotating writers and artists but without the input of Joss Whedon. In addition to this, After the Fall has also spawned multiple spin-offs of its own. Spike: After the Fall bridges the gap between Spike's "First Night" mini-arc and his first appearance in After the Fall over four issues. A second five-issue spin-off, Angel: Only Human, picks up after #23, following Gunn and Illyria. A four-issue mini-series, Spike: The Devil You Know was released, teaming up Spike with Eddie Hope for a story set between Angel issues #32 and #33. A fourth four-issue spin-off featuring Illyria, titled Angel: Illyria: Haunted, was released beginning in November 2010. IDW also announced an ongoing Spike title, another "canon" title featuring explicit Buffy Season Eight crossovers.

In the editor's column in the back of the Buffy the Vampire Slayer: Riley one-shot released by Dark Horse Comics, editor Scott Allie announced that the Angel comics would return to Dark Horse in late 2011. It was officially announced on August 19, 2010 that the series would come to an end with a six-issue arc titled "The Wolf, the Ram, and the Heart", and Dark Horse reacquiring the license to publish Angel titles, beginning with a new line of comics named Angel & Faith (co-starring Faith, 25 issues) in August 2011, tying in with a launch of Buffy Season Nine. The planned Spike ongoing spin-off instead became an eight issue mini-series.

== Publication history ==
Following the success of Dark Horse Comics' ongoing series Buffy the Vampire Slayer Season Eight, an official continuation to the television series Buffy the Vampire Slayer, series creator Joss Whedon wished to continue the story of Buffy spin-off Angel in the same medium. In September 2006, comic book writer Brian Lynch met Joss Whedon by chance in a restaurant near his home where he told Whedon about the imminent release of a spin-off comic by himself and artist Franco Urru, Spike: Asylum, published by IDW and based upon the character of Spike, a central character in both Buffy and Angel. To Lynch's surprise, Whedon was thrilled with Spike: Asylum, and Joss felt confident he had found a writer capable of capturing his characters' voices in the new medium, and was impressed with Franco's unique style. Whedon would later email Lynch, asking to meet up with him again in the same restaurant. Working together, the two plotted the events of a now 17-issue limited series for a continuation of the Angel saga, drawing from elements of Whedon's plan for a sixth televised season of Angel and several ideas proposed by Lynch. Whedon gave Lynch the freedom to write the series himself, only overseeing the project as if in the role of an executive producer.

=== Development into an ongoing series ===
The series later spun off into an ongoing series, with Kelley Armstrong taking over for her run, called Aftermath (#18–22). Brian Lynch returned for three stories, focusing on Gunn (#23), Drusilla (#24–25) (co-written with Juliet Landau) and Angel & Spike (#26–27). At San Diego Comic-Con in 2009, it was announced that Eisner Award-winning writer Bill Willingham was taking over as ongoing writer with issue #28 with a six-issue arc named "Immortality for Dummies" launching in December 2009, joined by artist Brian Denham. The series showed how Angel is kidnapped by the newly formed 'Immortality Incorporated'. While Angel fights to escape, his son Connor takes over the reins of Angel Investigations. Willingham finished his run on the series with #38, then David Tischman and Mariah Huehner wrote a six-issue arc titled "The Wolf, the Ram, and the Heart" (#39–44) that concluded the final Angel story arc at IDW Publishing before it moved to Dark Horse Comics.

=== Spin-offs ===
On March 11, 2008, it was announced that there would be a 4 issue spin-off titled Spike: After the Fall from July 2008, which will chronicle the time in between the events of the series finale "Not Fade Away" and After the Fall, continuing directly from the Angel: After the Fall issue "First Night, Part Three", focusing on the characters of Spike and Illyria. A second spin-off miniseries, Angel: Only Human, focuses on Gunn and Illyria following the After the Fall Epilogue wherein both seek redemption and an opportunity to come to terms with their humanity and the good and evil within them both.

Brian Lynch later announced a second, this-time-ongoing Spike spin-off from the Angel: After the Fall franchise. Spike will be set "a few months" after Spike has left hell, and feature in its supporting cast Groosalugg, Beck from Spike: Asylum, Betta George and Jeremy from Spike: After the Fall. Due to Dark Horse Comics' use of the Angel character in the Buffy Season Eight storyline "Twilight", Whedon allowed Lynch use of Buffy character Willow Rosenberg for his Spike series. Additionally, it is to feature the supporting cast Spike brings alongside him to Season Eight in "Last Gleaming" and act as a canonical lead-in to Buffy Season Eight, and therefore a spin-off to both.

== Premise ==
Set some time after the season 5 finale, "Not Fade Away", Los Angeles is feeling the aftermath of Angel taking a stand against the demonic Senior Partners, who have retaliated by literally sending the city to Hell. Along with a dragon he befriended, Angel is trying his best to remain a champion of good. Wesley remains contractually bound to the sinister Wolfram & Hart and the Partners after his death, while Gunn has become a vampire capturing victims under the pretense that he is rescuing them. Angel's son Connor, ex-girlfriend Nina, and old acquaintance Gwen are working to provide a safehouse for the people of Los Angeles under siege by demons. Spike lives under the protection of Illyria, who is no longer in control of her powers and unpredictably assumes the appearance and personality of Fred Burkle.

According to Whedon, the absence of budget constraints allows Angel's world to expand in ways that were never possible with the television series, saying "It will definitely use Season 6's proposed stories as inspiration, but it's not exactly Season 6".

== Publication ==
=== Maxi-series ===
| Title | Issue # | Release date |
|---|---|---|
| After the Fall #1 | 1 | November 21, 2007 |
| Writer: Brian Lynch with Joss Whedon | | Penciller: Franco Urru |
Los Angeles has been a demon war zone for months after Wolfram & Hart literally sent the entire city to hell in retaliation to Angel's actions in "Not Fade Away". Angel, having befriended a dragon, rescues citizens from the destruction and sends them to Connor, Gwen, and Nina for sanctuary. Meanwhile, the deceased Wesley is now an incorporeal representative of Wolfram & Hart, and Gunn has been turned into a vampire.
| After the Fall #2 | 2 | December 19, 2007 |
| Writer: Brian Lynch with Joss Whedon | | Penciller: Franco Urru |
Angel travels to Santa Monica to protect Connor from a demon lord whose son Angel killed. Gwen tells Angel that there's a new player in the game, and shows him a phrase written in blood. Angel realizes who the person is and heads to Beverly Hills, where he reunites with Spike, who has become lord of the area and lives surrounded by a harem of humans and demons. Angel and Spike fight briefly, and Illyria appears in defense of Spike. Meanwhile, Gunn has kidnapped Betta George and reveals that he blames Angel for being sired and wants revenge.
| After the Fall #3 | 3 | January 14, 2008 |
| Writer: Brian Lynch with Joss Whedon | | Penciller: Franco Urru |
Angel is attacked by Illyria, and gravely wounded. The Hell dimension is playing havoc with Illyria's powers, and she is time-skipping as she did in "Time Bomb". Connor arrives revealing that he and Spike have been working as partners; Spike's "Hugh Hefner" lifestyle is part of his act. Angel confronts the Lords of Los Angeles, and challenges them to a battle for all of Los Angeles in two days. On the final page, Angel's inner monologue reveals his wounds are mortal, and he is no longer a vampire.
| After the Fall #4 | 4 | February 20, 2008 |
| Writer: Brian Lynch with Joss Whedon | | Penciller: Franco Urru |
Flashbacks establish that Angel was turned human by the Senior Partners to restrict his ability to oppose them. At Wolfram and Hart, Angel is healed through mystic chants that fix his mortal wounds, but Wesley warns him that they are running out of the supplies to maintain the glamour that he is still a vampire. Two demons arrive and beckon Angel to follow them, while outside, Gunn prepares for an attack on the building. Angel and Wes are taken to the town of Silver Lake, which is ruled by their old ally Lorne, who notifies them of his neutral stance concerning the upcoming battle. After Angel has a reunion with Groosalugg, Gunn and his vampire minions plant a bomb in the empty Wolfram and Hart building, completely destroying it. Wesley's ghost fades away as Angel prepares for the battle ahead.
| After the Fall #5 | 5 | March 19, 2008 |
| Writer: Brian Lynch with Joss Whedon | | Penciller: Franco Urru |
Wesley has been transported to a void, where he has an argument with a disembodied voice over his role of being the last representative of Wolfram and Hart. Angel's allies consider their options with Spike being the most vocal about his desire to depart. The battle begins with Angel and all his friends at his side, thanks to Lorne's last minute rousing. Spike asks Angel for help concerning Illyria, as Wesley is returned from Hell and joins his companions. Spike reveals he never would have come to aid Angel had he known Wesley would be there. Illyria turns her attention to the scene, notices Wesley's arrival, and reverts to Fred.
| First Night, Part 1 #6 | 6 | April 2, 2008 |
| Writer: Brian Lynch with Joss Whedon | | Penciller: Tim Kane, David Messina, Stephen Mooney and John Byrne |
Bookended by images of Betta George in captivity, the 'First Night' stories of Spike, Connor, and Lorne are presented in three sections. In the first section, Spike switches from self-congratulation and thoughts of retirement into defending innocents—including Illyria, who initially appears as Fred. The second segment displays Connor's internal conflict as he considers rejoining the fight, and is then inevitably drawn into it. The third section is presented in a cartoonish rhyming style, showing Lorne's path from Lindsey's murder to becoming lord of Silver Lake.
| First Night, Part 2 #7 | 7 | May 7, 2008 |
| Writer: Brian Lynch with Joss Whedon | | Penciller: Tim Kane, Nick Runge and Stephen Mooney |
The second 'First Night' issue initially focuses on Wesley's after-death awareness, including a visit from an unnamed female temptress who is acting on the Senior Partners' behalf. She pretends to be Fred, but Wesley is not fooled. The scene then shifts to Connor's situation; Kate Lockley arrives, armed to the teeth, and "rescues" Connor, taking him to her well-armed lair. In the present day, Betta George is still held captive by Gunn's lackeys, and it is shown that Gunn's vampires have been training against captive Slayers.
| First Night, Part 3 #8 | 8 | June 11, 2008 |
| Writer: Brian Lynch with Joss Whedon and Scott Tipton | | Penciller: Tim Kane, Fabio Mantovani, Kevyn Schmidt and Mirco Pierfederici |
In the first section, Gwen is making out with a guy on the beach when Los Angeles is thrown into Hell. The change in scenery has caused the device regulating her power to stop working, causing her to accidentally electrocute her male companion. In the second section, a crazy guy is preaching about the end of the world when Los Angeles is sent to Hell. Finally, Gunn wakes up in a vampire's lair to discover he's been sired. Learning the vampires were ordered to turn him, he kills their leader and takes charge of the group.
| After the Fall #9 | 9 | June 18, 2008 |
| Writer: Brian Lynch with Joss Whedon | | Penciller: Nick Runge |
Angel and his friends defeat the Lords of L.A., who have misunderstood the true purpose of the Hagan Shafts (what they thought were weapons are actually tools used by immortals to commit suicide). Lorne becomes the new Lord of all Los Angeles, while Angel goes back to the Hyperion Hotel to do what he does best: help people. Connor makes his feelings for Gwen known to Angel. Wesley takes Fred to his corpse, where she reverts to Illyria, who reveals that Fred is still within her.
| After the Fall #10 | 10 | July 2, 2008 |
| Writer: Brian Lynch with Joss Whedon | | Penciller: Nick Runge and David Messina |
Angel has a comic book-esque dream where a superhero version of Spike is protecting the city while the mortal Angel is now an old man. Spike is left looking after Wesley. Angel, Connor, Gwen, Nina, and Illyria question a vampire over who killed the lord in #1. Illyria reveals to Connor, Gwen, and Nina that Angel is now human. Realizing that Illyria knew he was human through her ability to detect power, Angel tells Illyria to use her ability to search for the vampires "sitting on the power". Gunn has Betta George attacked by slayers, and eventually, a desperate George uses his ability to mentally freeze them. Gunn then has George attempt to contact help outside of L.A., but George is surprised to learn that Gunn has tricked him; Los Angeles going to Hell has been covered up. However, Betta George has also contacted Angel for help. Angel arrives, ready to attack, after Illyria detected Gunn's gang, "vampires atop a structure brimming with power". Angel is horrified, however, upon recognizing Gunn in their midst.
| After the Fall #11 | 11 | August 13, 2008 |
| Writer: Brian Lynch with Joss Whedon | | Penciller: Nick Runge |
Angel sends Fred away with Nina on the dragon, while he attempts to rescue Gunn. As Angel discovers that Gunn is now a vampire and his own life is in peril, Connor, Spike, and Gwen return on the dragon to help with the rescue mission. Gunn reveals his visions to Angel, then uses a magical talisman to reverse the spells on Angel: his glamour and all the healing spells. Angel lies bleeding, broken, and dying as the cavalry arrives, only to be shocked by Gwen's apparent betrayal.
| After the Fall #12 | 12 | September 4, 2008 |
| Writer: Brian Lynch with Joss Whedon | | Penciller: Stephen Mooney and Nick Runge |
Connor and Spike confront Gwen on her betrayal. Wesley is taken from headquarters to the scene of Angel's impending death, which spurs Fred's transformation into Illyria as she approaches the scene of a battle between Gwen and the dragon, whose name is revealed as Cordelia. On another plane, Angel is reunited with an apparition of Cordelia, meant to ease his transition. Wesley arrives and confronts Gunn with information from the Senior Partners: the visions are their own, and all they have wrought is part of a larger plan for Angel. He reveals Angel (and Angel alone) is still entitled to the future in the Shanshu prophecy, and delivers Angel a glimpse of it. Angel sees an image of himself as a vampire surrounded by dozens of dead bodies in the aftermath of an apocalyptic battle. This vision however, leads Angel to resign himself to death.
| After the Fall #13 | 13 | October 22, 2008 |
| Writer: Brian Lynch with Joss Whedon | | Penciller: Stephen Mooney |
Spike finds Gunn's captured Slayers, but they overpower him and he is slain. The Senior Partners send their larger army (legions of dragons) to the scene of the rooftop fray, and Cordelia the dragon is killed. Gwen, seeking atonement, sacrifices herself to destroy the legion in an electrical discharge. Connor makes his way into the building and defeats Gunn in combat, kicking him through the window. Connor's pleads to a dying Angel and helps him realize that he would never become a soulless vampire again; Cordelia's spirit bids Angel farewell after reassuring him of his status as a champion of good. While the group desperately encourage Angel to keep fighting and survive, Spike re-emerges seemingly alive, accompanied by the three Slayers who killed him. Gunn, on the streets, encounters Illyria and through feigning sadness and remorse, triggers her transformation into Fred, before he surreptitiously shoots her in the chest.
| After the Fall #14 | 14 | November 19, 2008 |
| Writer: Brian Lynch with Joss Whedon | | Penciller: Stephen Mooney |
A new demon army arrives in Los Angeles and takes Angel's body so that Angel can be resurrected to fulfill the prophecy. The source of Spike's own seemingly impossible resurrection is revealed as a five-minute time reset used by Gunn to train his vampires against Slayers. Groosalugg and his black pegasus, also named Cordelia, slay many of Wolfram & Hart's dragons. Despite being interrupted by the demon army, Gunn manages to successfully restore Illyria to her original demonic form, with the intent of using her fully restored powers to rewind time to before the Fall permanently. However, George looks within Illyria's mind: her frustration at being unable to create order leads her to decide to wholly collapse time - and with it, all existence.
| After the Fall #15 | 15 | December 17, 2008 |
| Writer: Brian Lynch with Joss Whedon | | Penciller: Franco Urru |
Illyria continues trying to unmake everything, believing that Fred would want to end everyone's suffering. She lashes out at and kills Groosalugg and many of the Spikettes. Gunn mortally wounds Connor and is defeated, but not killed, by Angel. Angel comes up with a plan to stop Illyria. Betta George focuses Spike and Wesley's memories of Fred into her mind, which paralyzes her long enough for Wolfram & Hart's demon avatars to take her out. Connor tells Angel not to let them win and then dies.
| After the Fall #16 | 16 | January 21, 2009 |
| Writer: Brian Lynch with Joss Whedon | | Penciller: Franco Urru |
Angel provokes Gunn into killing him after realizing that the Senior Partners' plans hinge on keeping himself alive. Angel's death causes the Senior Partners to reverse time to the moment before Los Angeles is sent into Hell, with everyone retaining memories of their time in Hell. While Spike and a now-humanoid Illyria attempt to hold off the demon army, a revamped Angel saves Gunn from being sired. They rush him to a hospital after discovering that Wolfram & Hart's Los Angeles branch has completely vanished. After meeting a resurrected Connor and several of LA's denizens who retained their memories, Angel realizes that he and his team are now publicly recognized heroes for their roles in saving the city.
| After the Fall #17 | 17 | February 11, 2009 |
| Writer: Brian Lynch with Joss Whedon | | Penciller: Franco Urru |
One month has passed. Angel and Nina research the mystery of the vanished Wolfram & Hart building at the public library (a wing of which has been renamed for Fred and Wesley). Angel leaves Cordelia the dragon in the care of Groosalugg as part of an attempt to reclaim his anonymity. Meanwhile, Spike rescues Betta George from one of the resurrected Lords of Hell, who warns him that the Lords want revenge against Angel and plan to do it by striking against the ones close to him. Realizing who the first target is, Angel, Spike, and George rush to the aid of Gunn (who is in a coma), but Illyria is revealed to be single-handedly protecting him. This allows Angel to peacefully visit Gunn in his hospital room and forgive him for the actions Gunn took while in Hell. Leaving Gunn with an Angel Investigations card, Angel walks off into the night, once more looking to help the helpless.

=== Continuing series ===
| Title | Issue # | Release date |
|---|---|---|
| #18: Aftermath, Part 1 | 18 | February 25, 2009 |
| Writer: Kelley Armstrong | | Penciller: Dave Ross |
After the Fall was followed by a five-issue storyarc titled Aftermath starting in #18; two weeks after the finale of "After the Fall", the storyarc will focus on the characters dealing with the events of issue #17. Novelist Kelley Armstrong (The Summoning) comes aboard to explore the many repercussions following the explosive Angel #17. Artist Dave Ross also comes aboard to present the first chapter of "Aftermath", wherein we learn who lived, who died, and who will be forever changed from the experience. Kelley Armstrong will write the arc, with Brian Lynch writing another continuation.
| #19: Aftermath, Part 2 | 19 | March 18, 2009 |
| Writer: Kelley Armstrong | | Penciller: Dave Ross |
As Angel and the remaining survivors from their sojourn to Hell attempt to rebuild their lives and find purpose once again, they must also contend with the threat of a vengeful Lord, a mysterious cat-changer and a winged being from beyond...
| #20: Aftermath, Part 3 | 20 | April 22, 2009 |
| Writer: Kelley Armstrong | | Penciller: Dave Ross and George Freeman |
Angel's attempts to return to normal have been upended by the cat-changer Dez. But who is she, and where does she come from? Find out here, even as a larger question—namely, who is Angel's angelic visitor from beyond, and who sent him here? — comes to light.
| #21: Aftermath, Part 4 | 21 | May 20, 2009 |
| Writer: Kelley Armstrong | | Penciller: Stefano Martino |
The aftermath of the city's return from hell continues to plague Angel, leading to a confrontation with the Powers-That-Be and some winged visitors from beyond the pale, even as Connor and Gwen face off with Dez.
| #22: Aftermath, Part 5 | 22 | June 17, 2009 |
| Writer: Kelley Armstrong | | Penciller: Dave Ross |
With the 'Angels' help, team Angel is able to release already captured 'Angels' but at what cost?
| #23: After the Fall—Epilogue: Become What You Are | 23 | July 1, 2009 |
| Writer: Brian Lynch | | Penciller: Franco Urru |
This issue focuses on the character of Gunn and how he went from being comatose in After the Fall #17 to his apparently quickly recovery in Aftermath #18. As Lynch announced: "This one is packed with big shake-ups. We see a couple of reunions, some fun cameos, characters charting new journeys, and Franco and I tell a little tale that serves as a wonderful capper to the AFTER THE FALL storyline."
| #24: Drusilla, Part 1 | 24 | August 5, 2009 |
| Writer: Brian Lynch and Juliet Landau | | Penciller: Franco Urru |
This issue sees the return of Drusilla to the Angelverse. Set just before the Fall, we find Drusilla contained in a mental institution. Why is she there, and what will happen when she fights back?
| #25: Drusilla, Part 2 | 25 | September 16, 2009 |
| Writer: Brian Lynch and Juliet Landau | | Penciller: Franco Urru |
Continuing from the massacre at the end of the last issue, Drusilla starts to have visions. But are they real?
| #26: Boys and Their Toys, Part 1 | 26 | October 7, 2009 |
| Writer: Brian Lynch | | Penciller: Stephen Mooney |
At 'Sci-Fi Fest San Diego' Angel sees how Hollywood views the events of 'After the Fall'. But he is there for more serious reasons - the 'Flaming Sword' that killed him is up for auction. Who wants it the most and why? Spike turns up, curious about the movie, and the two vamps are forced to take on each other's identities to stop the sword from getting into the wrong hands. But when Chaos reigns - will Spike make a better Angel than Angel?
| #27: Boys and Their Toys, Part 2 | 27 | November 4, 2009 |
| Writer: Brian Lynch | | Penciller: Stephen Mooney |
With a spell having turned everyone at the convention into their costumes, Angel must find a means to stop the spell before Spike - who has turned into a caricature of Angel - causes more damage than he can control.
| #28: The Crown Prince Syndrome / A Devil Walks Into a Bar... | 28 | December 16, 2009 |
| Writer: Bill Willingham and Bill Williams | | Penciller: Brian Denham and David Messina |
An all-new adventure begins as Eisner-winning writer Bill Willingham takes Angel down some pretty twisted roads as the group's (and its leader's) fame starts causing tension and testing loyalties. This issue also premiers the backup story of the devil Eddie Hope, which continues through issue #39.
| #29: Immortality for Dummies / Lucky Number 13 | 29 | January 13, 2010 |
| Writer: Bill Willingham and Bill Williams | | Penciller: Brian Denham and David Messina |
Where has the "hero of L.A." gone? While Team Angel Investigations try to figure out how to handle the everyday demons, danger, and evil-doing on their own, Angel's whereabouts turn out to be part of a seriously sinister conspiracy.
| #30: The Trouble With Felicia / Intermission | 30 | February 17, 2010 |
| Writer: Bill Willingham and Bill Williams | | Penciller: Brian Denham and David Messina |
Things are not going so well for either our famously intrepid hero or his "merry" band of assistant heroes. Spike and Gunn finds themselves committing rooftop shenanigans, Connor is in over his head back at the office, and Angel is starting to wonder if anyone is going to find him before he dies of boredom. And just what is Connor "chosen" for, anyway?
| #31: The Big Dustup / The Risk of Skipping Ahead | 31 | March 17, 2010 |
| Writer: Bill Willingham and Bill Williams | | Penciller: Brian Denham and David Messina |
While Connor tries to get his devoted army of demon soldiers under control, a new player steps up, and Illyria decides not to take Angel's continued absence lying down. Meanwhile, Eddie Hope finds out that being a force for justice has some major consequences.
| #32: Roman a Clef / The Getaway | 32 | April 28, 2010 |
| Writer: Bill Willingham and Bill Williams | | Penciller: Brian Denham and David Messina |
As more vampires start running around Hollywood, Connor and crew must figure out a way to stop the carnage and deal with his little merry band of demon girls. Meanwhile, Angel has it out with his captors, before learning that things really can get weirder than he thought.
| #33: Letters Home: A Jamesian Interlude / My Dinner With Gunn | 33 | May 26, 2010 |
| Writer: Bill Willingham and Bill Williams | | Penciller: Elena Casagrande |
Now that Angel is back in the fold, Connor must readjust to life as the Chosen One's son. Luckily, he has an army of demon women at his beck and call. But nothing could really prepare anyone for what Illyria has in mind.
| #34: Bedroom Follies: Chapter 1 of Connorland / The Long Tale of Gunn | 34 | June 23, 2010 |
| Writer: Bill Willingham and Bill Williams | | Penciller: Elena Casagrande |
In the Angel family 'like father, like son' takes on a whole new meaning. With prophecies practically falling from the sky, Connor and Angel must figure out how to work together without getting back into bad habits. Meanwhile, Illyria's newfound interest in the prodigal son starts to get a little weird and the rest of the team wonders just what to do about ex-watcher Laura Kay Weathermill.
| #35: Prophet for Profit, Part 1: Chapter 2 of Connorland / Gunn Smoked | 35 | July 28, 2010 |
| Writer: Bill Willingham and Bill Williams | | Penciller: Elena Casagrande |
Sometimes being a 'chosen' one really sucks. Which is something Connor is about to find out when his little band of merry demon warrior women decide L.A. really needs to clean up its act. No human or supernatural thingie is safe from their swords. And not even Angel knows how to get them out of this mess.
| #36: Prophet for Profit, Part 2: Chapter 3 of Connorland / Gunfight | 36 | August 18, 2010 |
| Writer: Bill Willingham, Bill Williams, David Tischman & Mariah Huehner | | Penciller: Elena Casagrande and Brian Denham |
When L.A. went to hell, everyone thought things couldn’t get any worse. Well, they were dead wrong. Especially now that the new Big Bad is officially out for blood. Meanwhile, the magical fallout from The Fall continues to get weirder, and Angel find himself with more enemies than you can wave a sharp wooden type thingy at.
| #37: Prophet for Profit, Part 3: Chapter 4 of Connorland / Round One | 37 | September 29, 2010 |
| Writer: Bill Willingham, Bill Williams, David Tischman & Mariah Huehner | | Penciller: Valerio Schiti and Elena Casagrande |
Soul-Eaters. Demon armies. Dusting limbs. Prophecies run amok. The Angel-verse is always a little bit strange. But with Connor's life in danger, Angel must step up and take back his city. The only problem? It may already be too late!
| #38: Cats in the Cradle: Chapter 5 of Connorland / Knockout Punch | 38 | October 27, 2010 |
| Writer: Bill Willingham, Bill Williams, David Tischman & Mariah Huehner | | Penciller: Elena Casagrande |
Death. Destruction. Destiny. None of these can compare with the betrayal Team Angel is about to face, the old enemy that's about to re-surface, and the epic showdown Angel and Connor are going to have to tackle together. And someone other than the readers finally wonders, just what the hell is really up with Spike? With this issue Bill Willingham finishes his run on the Angel series.
| #39: The Wolf, the Ram, & the Heart, Part 1 / Sunset | 39 | November 17, 2010 |
| Writer: David Tischman, Mariah Huehner, and Bill Williams | | Penciller: Elena Casagrande, Valerio Schiti, and Walter Trono |
Now that all the weirdness has been explained, Angel and company are looking to get back to what they do best. Except an old enemy with the letters W and H comes back, Angel gets transported, and a whole new can of demony worms is opened. Literally.
| #40: The Wolf, the Ram, & the Heart, Part 2 | 40 | December 15, 2010 |
| Writer: David Tischman and Mariah Huehner | | Penciller: Jason Armstrong |
Angel discovers an old nemesis with a common foe, as James continues to turn L.A. into his own private demon farm. Can the enemy of his enemy be his friend, or is Angel about to get major league betrayed?
| #41: The Wolf, the Ram, & the Heart, Part 3 | 41 | January 26, 2011 |
| Writer: David Tischman and Mariah Huehner | | Penciller: Stephen Mooney |
Angel quickly adapts to his new situation, only to discover that Wolfram and Hart and James are the least of his worries, as someone unexpected decides it's time to stop playing nice. Meanwhile, Connor and the gang are under attack at the new headquarters from yet another threat!
| #42: The Wolf, the Ram, & the Heart, Part 4 | 42 | February 16, 2011 |
| Writer: David Tischman and Mariah Huehner | | Penciller: Elena Casagrande and Emanuel Simeoni |
Illyria finds Angel in deep trouble, and Angel finds Illyria altered. The two of them must confront Wolfram & Hart, and the Big Bad, if they have any hope of rescuing L.A. Of course, it's not nearly that simple, and Illyria must make a sacrifice.
| #43: The Wolf, the Ram, & the Heart, Part 5 | 43 | March 23, 2011 |
| Writer: David Tischman and Mariah Huehner | | Penciller: Elena Casagrande and Emanuel Simeoni |
Time is quite literally running out for Angel. He must stop the ultimate Big Bad, Wolfram & Hart, and somehow get back to Connor before L.A. becomes a permanent demon farm. Can Illyria help, or is the sacrifice too great?
| #44: The Wolf, the Ram, & the Heart, Part 6 | 44 | April 27, 2011 |
| Writer: David Tischman and Mariah Huehner | | Penciller: Elena Casagrande |
In the final issue, storylines dating back to After the Fall #1 all tie together in this explosive last hurrah for Angel and his team. Don't miss your chance to say goodbye to the original vampire with a soul before he heads off into the twilight.

=== Mini-series ===
==== Spike: After the Fall ====
| Title | Issue # | Release date |
|---|---|---|
| Spike: After the Fall #1 | 1 | July 16, 2008 |
| Writer: Brian Lynch | | Penciller: Franco Urru |
Spinning out of Spike's First Night story, the first issue of Spike: After the Fall shows Spike and Illyria watching over a group of citizens. Illyria keeps turning back into Fred, and Spike is forced to keep turning her back into Illyria to protect her. Spike questions whether he may have feelings for Fred, and the group of women that Spike is with during Angel: After the Fall make their first chronological appearance.
| Spike: After the Fall #2 | 2 | August 6, 2008 |
| Writer: Brian Lynch | | Penciller: Franco Urru |
The issue opens with Spike meeting the dragon: while Spike considers ways of killing it, the dragon communicates that Spike should mount it. Once together, the dragon takes Spike to Wolfram & Hart, where a figure whom Spike does not recognize is suspended inside an energy field, writhing in pain. Meanwhile, the civilians are at the mercy of the group of women. Spike encounters one, commandeers her truck, and finds the hostages, then tries to run down their leader of the group of female demons. She throws Fred in front of the truck, and Fred reverts to Illyria on impact. Illyria and Spike begin to melee the demon women, but their leader drains life from the hostages, turning them into zombies, and Spike and Illyria are subdued. Spike awakens chained in a dark room filled with his zombified wards, and the demon leader tells him she is keeping him alive for his connections.
| Spike: After the Fall #3 | 3 | September 17, 2008 |
| Writer: Brian Lynch | | Penciller: Franco Urru |
Non, the head of the female demons, attempts to bargain with a Gunn to return Spike to him. Gunn beats her down and lets her go leading her to decide to kill Spike and all the humans with him. Non attempts to behead Illyria, but the ax shatters on contact. Illyria breaks free and starts killing all the female demons. Non prepares to kill the last human hostage before Connor appears and stops her.
| Spike: After the Fall #4 | 4 | October 29, 2008 |
| Writer: Brian Lynch | | Penciller: Franco Urru |
Connor, Spike, and Illyria continue their battle with Non. In the midst of the battle, Non attempts to feed on Connor, whom she realizes is not human, and on whom she cannot feed. After discovering that Non's Sadecki demon controls her flock of females, Spike tells Illyria to finish it off. During her confrontation with the demon, she again starts reverting between Fred and Illyria, but finally is able to gather herself and kill the demon. Realizing his plan worked, Spike goes mano a mano with Non. After taking a beating from Spike, Non uses the last human hostage that the gang saved to gain some energy back. Illyria realizes this and kills the human, allowing Spike to finish off Non. Spike then becomes Lord of Beverly Hills, and tells the other lords to keep out. Later, Spike and Connor meet up and begin their crusade of saving the remaining humans in Los Angeles.

==== Angel: Only Human ====
| Title | Issue # | Release date |
|---|---|---|
| Angel: Only Human #1 | 1 | August 12, 2009 |
| Writer: Scott Lobdell | | Penciller: David Messina |
Spinning out of the events of Angel #23, Gunn and Illyria embark on their very own five-part miniseries. Fully restored in body if not in mind, Illyria—infected with humanity—and Gunn—infected with darkness—hit the road in an attempt to find redemption, or die trying.
| Angel: Only Human #2 | 2 | September 9, 2009 |
| Writer: Scott Lobdell | | Penciller: David Messina and Emanuela Lupacchino |
They consider themselves the purest strain of demons they are the Scourge! This race of demon supremacists are determined to liberate an enslaved Old One from the nether-bowels of... Texas! Fortunately Illyria and Gunn are on hand to make sure that doesn't happen. That is, if she's not distracted by a passionate kiss from Fred's long ago prom date!
| Angel: Only Human #3 | 3 | October 14, 2009 |
| Writer: Scott Lobdell | | Penciller: David Messina |
Another Old One roams the Earth! And don't think he's going to go easy on Illyria, his ex master. (Considering she's the one that enslaved him several hundred thousand years ago, it doesn't look like a reconciliation is in the cards.) All this and a glimpse into Gunn's past, revealing the very first time he ever met a vampire... in his beloved Grandmother's kitchen.
| Angel: Only Human #4 | 4 | November 18, 2009 |
| Writer: Scott Lobdell | | Penciller: David Messina |
Unlike Illyria, this Old One is in its original form and the resulting battle between the demon lord and its pet stretches from one end of Texas to the other! Ever wonder just how powerful Illyria is when she doesn't have to worry about Angel or Spike or Wesley whispering sweet restraint in her ear? Meanwhile, Gunn battles The Scourge.
| Angel: Only Human #5 | 5 | December 23, 2009 |
| Writer: Scott Lobdell | | Penciller: David Messina |
As Gunn faces down the last of The Scourge and makes a desperate last stand, Illyria faces off one last time with her old "pet", Baticus. How do you defeat a demon who keeps growing back all his parts? But it's the gruesome discovery that Gunn makes that could change the entire game.

==== Spike: The Devil You Know ====
| Title | Issue # | Release date |
|---|---|---|
| Spike: The Devil You Know #1 | 1 | June 16, 2010 |
| Writer: Bill Williams | | Penciller: Chris Cross |
While out and about (drinking, naturally) Spike gets in trouble over a girl (of course) and finds himself in the middle of a conspiracy that involves Hellmouths, blood factories, and demons. Just another day in Los Angeles, really. But when devil Eddie Hope gets involved, they might just kill each other before getting to the bad guys.
| Spike: The Devil You Know #2 – The Thundering Hooves of Death | 2 | July 21, 2010 |
| Writer: Bill Williams | | Penciller: Chris Cross |
Spike and Eddie continue to butt heads, sometimes literally, as they try to figure out what to do about some baby Hellmouths, blood manufacturing, and oh yeah…world destruction.
| Spike: The Devil You Know #3 – The Thunderous Hooves of Death | 3 | September 1, 2010 |
| Writer: Bill Williams | | Penciller: Chris Cross and Jose Beroy |
Reluctant teammates Spike and Eddie Hope are having a hell of time getting information out of the demon world about their newest nemesis and her agenda. They’re also having a hard time not strangling each other. But a high-stakes card game, some new Hellmouth problems, and a really big killer demon, could force them to have to get along in a hurry.
| Spike: The Devil You Know #4 – The Last Demon Standing | 4 | September 22, 2010 |
| Writer: Bill Williams | | Penciller: Chris Cross and Jose Beroy |
Trading quips along with punches, Spike and Eddie Hope make a last desperate effort to save Los Angeles and stop some hostile demons from setting up shop with their baby Hellmouths. Which is all in a day's work until something goes horribly wrong.

==== Angel: Illyria: Haunted ====
| Title | Issue # | Release date |
|---|---|---|
| Angel: Illyria: Haunted #1 | 1 | November 10, 2010 |
| Writer: Scott Tipton and Mariah Huehner | | Penciller: Elena Casagrande |
Reborn out of tragedy, older than time, Illyria has been one of the most mysterious and alien members of Team Angel since her resurrection. Infected with the memories of those who loved Fred, Illyria now struggles with the burden of her guilt. Seeking out help from Angel and Spike, Illyria begins a quest that will take her back into her past, facing the consequences of being whole again in a world to which she no longer belongs.
| Angel: Illyria: Haunted #2 | 2 | December 22, 2010 |
| Writer: Scott Tipton and Mariah Huehner | | Penciller: Walter Trono |
Illyria must complete a task before she can access the way to The Deeper Well, and she needs Spike's help to do it. What sort of trinket could a demon possibly need, and what will she find when she goes back 'home'?
| Angel: Illyria: Haunted #3 | 3 | January 26, 2011 |
| Writer: Scott Tipton and Mariah Huehner | | Penciller: Elena Casagrande |
The Deeper Well - something about the name fills everyone with dread, even Illyria. The last time she was there, she was entombed in essence only, a prisoner. Now she must face the new protector of the well and its minions and she won't stop until she gets the answers she's looking for.
| Angel: Illyria: Haunted #4 | 4 | February 16, 2011 |
| Writer: Scott Tipton and Mariah Huehner | | Penciller: Elena Casagrande |
Reclaiming some of what she had lost, Illyria must choose between what she was and who she could become. Her choice comes at a price as well as a final farewell she never thought she'd make.

=== One-shots ===
| Title | Release date |
|---|---|
| Angel Annual #1: Last Angel in Hell | December 23, 2009 |
| Writer: Brian Lynch | Penciller: Stephen Mooney |
When L.A. went to Hell in After the Fall, so did thousands of screenwriters, one of whom wrote a movie based on Angel's experiences there. The first-ever Angel Annual presents an adaptation of Angel's travails, Hollywood-style, in Angel: Last Angel in Hell: The Official Movie Adaptation. Mooney presents two movie poster covers, one featuring the real Angel and company, the other with their Hollywood counterparts.
| Angel Special: Lorne — The Music of the Spheres | March 24, 2010 |
| Writer: John Byrne | Penciller: John Byrne |
The world is in peril (again)! Only the most unlikely member of Angel's entourage is able to save the day. A special book-length tribute to the late Andy Hallett and his character, Lorne.
| Angel Yearbook | May 25, 2011 |
| Writer: Jeff Mariotte, Peter David, Scott Tipton, Elena Casagrande, Patrick Shand, Daniel Roth, Brian Lynch, Chris Ryall | Penciller: David Messina, Stephen Mooney, Elena Casagrande, Franco Urru |
IDW's final farewell to the Angelverse is full of the creators who have been telling stories about the vampire with a soul from the very beginning. All new stories by fan-favorite creators from throughout IDW's run! Each tale will be a farewell from the writers and artists who have known him best.

=== Collected editions ===
The series has been collected into a number of volumes:

| Title | Issues # | Release date | ISBN |
|---|---|---|---|
| Angel: After the Fall – Volume One | 1–5 | July 16, 2008 | ISBN 1-60010-181-X (Hardcover) ISBN 1-60010-343-X (Trade Paperback) |
| Angel: After the Fall – Volume Two: First Night | 6–8 | September 10, 2008 | ISBN 1-60010-231-X (Hardcover) ISBN 1-60010-393-6 (Trade Paperback) |
| Angel: After the Fall – Volume Three | 9–12 | March 11, 2009 | ISBN 1-60010-377-4 (Hardcover) |
| Angel: After the Fall – Volume Four | 13–17 | July 15, 2009 | ISBN 1-60010-461-4 (Hardcover) |
| Angel: After the Fall – Premiere Edition | 1–17 | March 8, 2011 | ISBN 1-60010-861-X (Hardcover) |
| Angel: Aftermath – Volume Five | 18–22 | September 9, 2009 | ISBN 1-60010-516-5 (Hardcover) |
| Angel: Last Angel in Hell – Volume Six | 23–27, Angel Annual #1 | May 30, 2010 | ISBN 1-60010-732-X (Hardcover) |
| Angel: Immortality for Dummies – Volume One | 28–32 | July 14, 2010 | ISBN 1-60010-689-7 (Hardcover) |
| Angel: The Crown Prince Syndrome – Volume Two | 33–38 | December 14, 2010 | ISBN 1-60010-789-3 (Hardcover) |
| Angel: The Wolf, the Ram, and the Heart – Volume Three | 39–44 | June 21, 2011 | ISBN 1-60010-944-6 (Hardcover) |
| Angel: The End | 28–44, Angel Yearbook | December 13, 2011 | ISBN 1-61377-078-2 (Hardcover) |
| Spike: After the Fall | 1–4 | February 11, 2009 | ISBN 1-60010-368-5 (Hardcover) ISBN 1-60010-665-X (Trade Paperback) |
| Angel: Only Human | 1–5 | February 17, 2010 | ISBN 1-60010-597-1 (Trade Paperback) |
| Spike: The Devil You Know | 1–4 | December 14, 2010 | ISBN 1-60010-764-8 (Trade Paperback) |
| Angel: Illyria: Haunted | 1–4 | May 17, 2011 | ISBN 1-60010-933-0 (Trade Paperback) |
| Angel: Season Six, Volume 1 | 1–12, Spike: After the Fall 1-4 | October 29, 2015 | ISBN 978-1631404382 (Trade Paperback) |
| Angel: Season Six, Volume 2 | 13-27, story "This One Time" from Angel Yearbook, Angel Annual #1 | August 30, 2016 | ISBN 978-1631406799 (Trade Paperback) |

== Reception ==
Initial reviews were generally favorable. Troy Brownfield of Newsarama believed the most enjoyable aspect of the first issue "was seeing members of the extensive cast turn up again in surprising ways" and was pleased to see the return of minor characters from the television series. He described the reveal of Gunn as a vampire as "rather startling" and a "new injection of life" for the character. IGN's Bryan Joel believed that the first issue wasn't as accessible for new readers as that of Buffy Season Eight, claiming that it read "less like the season premiere of the next season of Angel and more like episode 23 of season 5". He felt that the tone and characterization remained "true to its source material and fans will be happy to know Whedon's trademark dialogue knack is, for the most part, intact", but warned that the elaborate visuals of Angel flying through the hell-bound Los Angeles on a dragon may be too far removed from the television series for some readers. In an "Additional Take" review, Joel's colleague criticized the dialogue for lacking "the trademark witty banter" and worried that the hellish new setting might detract from the reality of the characters, describing it as "an interesting turn for what was once a very grounded fantasy series".

The artwork by Franco Urru was described as "reasonably good" by Brownfield, who claimed that while it captures the likeness of the characters, Urru's work lacks sharpness and "the weight of that terrific Tony Harris cover." IGN believed Urru is talented when he "lets loose" creating demons, but less impressive when it comes to matching characters to their respective actors.

The series has been a success for publisher IDW Publishing, reporting it has become the company's highest-charting comic book release ever.
