= Spike (IDW Publishing) =

Publication information
- Publisher: IDW Publishing
- Schedule: Monthly
- Format: Limited series
- Publication date: October 2010 – May 2011
- No. of issues: 8
- Main characters: Spike; Betta George; Groosalugg; Willow Rosenberg; Beck

Creative team
- Created by: Brian Lynch; Based on characters by Joss Whedon
- Written by: Brian Lynch
- Penciller: Franco Urru

Spike is a comic book series published by IDW Publishing. Written by Brian Lynch, it focuses on Spike, a main character in television series Buffy the Vampire Slayer and its spin-off, Angel. Spike is a spin-off from IDW's larger Angel: After the Fall franchise, and it also serves as a prequel to Dark Horse Comics' Buffy the Vampire Slayer Season Eight comic book series. As such, it is "canon" to the overall "Buffyverse" in which stories take place. Although originally intended as an ongoing series, the Angel rights transfer from IDW to Dark Horse caused the series end after eight issues.

Lynch had previously written for Spike in the comic books Spike: Asylum when Buffy and Angel creator Joss Whedon approached him to write the canonical continuation to Angel, After the Fall, in 2007. For Spike, Lynch is reunited with frequent collaborator, penciller Franco Urru. Because of the circumstances behind Dark Horse's use of the Angel character, Whedon offered Lynch use of a main character in the Buffy franchise, and Lynch adapted the storyline to bridge IDW's After the Fall with Dark Horse's Season Eight.

== Plot ==
Brian Lynch revealed some of the plot at San Diego Comic-Con in 2010. The plot of the first arc features Spike travelling to Las Vegas for a mission refused by Angel. There, he acquires the crew and the ship introduced properly in the pages of Buffy Season Eight arc "Last Gleaming".

== Publication history ==
Originally intended as a truly ongoing series, Lynch outlines his premise as "what would happen if Spike headlined his own TV show"; in this sense, the series aims to be a true Spike title and not merely an Angel spin-off. Lynch feels that the "kinda-sorta-very loose crossover" with Buffy Season Eight makes the comic book feel more like a "genuine Spike event" (rather than another of Spike's self-titled miniseries). Insofar as Lynch aims his series to be the Spike TV show that never was, Lynch cast its characters in the mould of Buffy and Angel' respective casts: a team of diverse characters like the Scooby Gang and Angel Investigations. Spike assembles his own team; Lynch describes these as the people Spike feels will listen to his commands.

For his supporting cast, Lynch had originally wanted to have Lorne as in his earlier Spike: Shadow Puppets. However, following the death of actor Andy Hallett, who portrayed Lorne in the Angel series, IDW policy placed Lorne off-limits following John Byrne's send-off comic for the character, Music of the Spheres. Instead, Lynch elected to use the character of Groosalugg. This allows him to use the dragon and pegasus characters introduced in After the Fall and placed in Groo's care in that storyline. Additionally, Lynch uses his own inventions, the telepathic fish Betta George (introduced into the Buffy canon in After the Fall) and Beck, a pyrokinetic girl, first introduced in Spike: Asylum. Lynch expressed excitement at bringing George back into the comics, as he had proved popular with fans of After the Fall.

When it was leaked earlier that Buffy Season Eight would include Angel in an important role, this came as a shock to IDW editorial and its writers. Then-current Angel writer Bill Willingham in particular expressed considerable displeasure about their use of his main character. Dark Horse editors and Whedon extended the use of Buffy character Willow Rosenberg to Lynch after Lynch joked that it would make it okay. Although Whedon stipulated he would have to oversee the character's interactions in Spike, Lynch was excited because writing with notes from Whedon was how they produced After the Fall together. Lynch writes of being a huge fan of Willow and enjoying her interactions with Spike in episodes of Buffy the Vampire Slayer.

For Lynch, having Spike as a headlining character makes for a very different writing experience to writing Spike as a supporting character in Angel. Lynch reflects that unlike stories where Buffy Summers or Angel take the leading role, Spike is no longer there to stand at the sidelines and remark sardonically on the action. As leading man, the supporting characters of the series all work towards servicing him and his storyline. Spike's approach is also markedly different from Buffy's or Angel's; true to his character, he is more passionate and less tactical, making for tonally quite different stories to episodes of the aforementioned characters' shows. For Spike's personal development, Lynch expresses that as leader of the group, Spike has more responsibilities than ever before. For instance, he has to look out for the wellbeing of the team he has assembled. His new leadership role involves people management in addition to saving the world.

Like Los Angeles in Angel and Sunnydale in Buffy the Vampire Slayer, Spike has its own setting. Lynch chose Las Vegas as the locale for the Spike's book. In common with the aforementioned locations, Lynch writes of Las Vegas that it "has become more evil than usual, and supernatural occurrences are happening all over town."

== Issues ==
| Title | Issue # | Release date |
|---|---|---|
| Spike #1: Alone Together Now | 1 | October 13, 2010 |
| Writer: Brian Lynch | | Penciller: Franco Urru |
Spike goes to Las Vegas to discover why demonic activity is on the upswing.
| Spike #2: What Happens in Vegas, Slays in Vegas | 2 | November 10, 2010 |
| Writer: Brian Lynch | | Penciller: Franco Urru and Nicola Zanni |
Spike takes a Las Vegas show about his life and discovers the people behind it all have more plans then just mocking him.
| Spike #3: Everybody Loves Spike | 3 | December 8, 2010 |
| Writer: Brian Lynch | | Penciller: Nicola Zanni |
Drusilla is back and creating havoc...but so are many other players from Spike's past.
| Spike #4: You Haven't Changed a Bit | 4 | January 5, 2011 |
| Writer: Brian Lynch | | Penciller: Nicola Zanni |
Drusilla's new love tries to get Spike's soul back and it just might work, considering he was the original owner.
| Spike #5: Bedknobs and Boomsticks | 5 | February 23, 2011 |
| Writer: Brian Lynch | | Penciller: Stephen Mooney |
Among the many reinforcements Spike has called in to battle Wolfram and Hart's return to reality is Willow Rosenberg.
| Spike #6: Something Borrowed | 6 | March 16, 2011 |
| Writer: Brian Lynch | | Penciller: Stephen Mooney |
Wolfram and Hart is planning to get the hell out of Las Vegas. Literally. And they don't care who they have to kill.
| Spike #7: Give and Take | 7 | April 13, 2011 |
| Writer: Brian Lynch | | Penciller: Stephen Mooney |
Spike's plan to stop the Big Bad (well, all the Big Bads) depends on trusting Drusilla. Nobody can trust Drusilla.
| Spike #8: Stranger Things | 8 | May 4, 2011 |
| Writer: Brian Lynch | | Penciller: Franco Urru |
Wolfram and Hart's plan to leave Earth behind ends in a gigantic battle in the middle of the Las Vegas strip.

=== Collected editions ===
The series has been collected into two hardcover volume editions being released by IDW Publishing:

| Title | Issues # | Release date | ISBN |
|---|---|---|---|
| Spike: Alone Together Now - Volume 1 | 1-4 | May 10, 2011 | ISBN 1-60010-908-X (Hardcover) |
| Spike: Stranger Things - Volume 2 | 5-8 | September 13, 2011 | ISBN 1-61377-006-5 (Hardcover) |
| Spike: The Complete Series | 1-8 | July 31, 2012 | ISBN 1-61377-285-8 (Paperback) |

== Continuity ==
In the final scene of the "Twilight" story arc of Buffy Season Eight, Spike arrives in a mysterious yellow ship claiming to have a solution. Lynch and Dark Horse editor Scott Allie have both said that the Spike series will introduce the origins of Spike's ship and its crew. In a Q&A on the SlayAlive fan forums, Lynch said himself that the story was set a few months after Willingham's "Immortality for Dummies" arc in Angel, and at Comic-Con he said that although he wanted the comic to be timeless, it was also set "a few months" after the Fall of Los Angeles in After the Fall.
