= List of Angel comics =

Angel comic book refers to one of two series published by Dark Horse Comics during 2000–2002. Both of these series are based on the television series Angel, and were published while the television series was on air. The first volume was an ongoing series halted after seventeen issues. The second volume was a mini-series, spanning four issues. Various related works have come out coinciding with these volumes.

In 2005, IDW Publishing picked up the rights and began publishing various Angel related mini-series and one-shots set during and after the show's final season (these series are considered non-canonical). In 2007, IDW began publishing Angel: After the Fall, which is considered the canonical Angel season 6 (following the success of Buffy the Vampire Slayer Season Eight from Dark Horse) and is overseen by the show's creator Joss Whedon. IDW continued to publish an Angel ongoing title until Whedon transferred the rights to the character back to Dark Horse, where he will feature as part of the Buffy Season Nine franchise, starring most prominently in the ongoing series Angel and Faith.

== Dark Horse Comics ==
=== Angel: The Hollower (1999) ===
#	Title	Writer(s)	Artist(s)	Release Date	Reprinted in
1	"The Hollower, Part One"	Christopher Golden	Penciller(s): Hector Gomez Inker(s): Sandu Florea Colorist(s): Guy Major	May 12, 1999	The Hollower BtVS Omnibus Vol. 4
2	"The Hollower, Part Two"	Christopher Golden	Penciller(s): Hector Gomez Inker(s): Sandu Florea Colorist(s): Guy Major	June 9, 1999	The Hollower BtVS Omnibus Vol. 4
3	"The Hollower, Part Three"	Christopher Golden	Penciller(s): Hector Gomez Inker(s): Sandu Florea Colorist(s): Guy Major	March 24, 1999	The Hollower BtVS Omnibus Vol. 4

=== TV Guide Ultimate Cable (1999) ===
#	Title	Writer(s)	Artist(s)	Release Date	Reprinted in
1	"Point of Order" (8 pages)	David Fury	Penciller(s): Ryan Sook Inker(s): Ryan Sook Colorist(s): Dave Stewart	November 18, 1999	Strange Bedfellows Angel Omnibus (Dark Horse)
Exclusive to TV Guide Ultimate Cable readers. 3 pages. Collected in Angel: Strange Bedfellows.

=== Angel Classics (1999–2001) ===
#	Title	Writer(s)	Artist(s)	Release Date	Reprinted in
1–3	"Surrogates"	Christopher Golden	Penciller(s): Christian Zanier, Marvin Mariano Inker(s): Andy Owens Colorist(s): Digital Broome	November 10, 1999 December 22, 1999 January 12, 2000	Surrogates Angel Omnibus (Dark Horse)
Angel must solve a case involving a demonic fertility clinic, when he finds a rash of murdered mothers, and their husbands turned into zombie-like guards. Assisted by Cordelia Chase and Allen Francis Doyle (simply referred to as Doyle), Angel is able to uncover the mystery, but Angel is thrown into a well for his troubles. Escaping his captivity just in time to survive the harsh light of day, Angel and his gang are able to stop the clinic. Set early in Angel first season, before the episode "Hero". Collected in Angel: Surrogates.
4	"The Changeling Wife"	Christopher Golden	Penciller(s): Eric Powell Inker(s): Eric Powell Colorist(s): Guy Major	February 9, 2000	Strange Bedfellows Angel Omnibus (Dark Horse)
In Los Angeles, things can often not be what they seem. Angel attempts to help a woman who is trapped in an abusive marriage, however Angel is not seeing where the danger really lies. Collected in Angel: Strange Bedfellows.
5–7	"Earthly Possessions"	Christopher Golden & Thomas E. Sniegoski	Penciller(s): Christian Zanier Inker(s): Andy Owens Colorist(s): Guy Major	March 8, 2000 April 12, 2000 May 10, 2000	Earthly Possessions Angel Omnibus (Dark Horse)
Angel attempts to drive a demon out of a possessed lawyer; Father Noe is an excommunicated priest who gives him a hand. Noe seems to hold expert knowledge on removing demonic forces. He is known to some as "The Exorcist to the Stars." However, there may be a darker reason for his success. Supposed to be set early in Angel's first season, before the episode "Hero". Collected in Angel: Earthly Possessions.
8–9	"Beneath the Surface"	Christopher Golden & Thomas E. Sniegoski	Penciller(s): Eric Powell & Paul Lee Inker(s): Eric Powell & Brian Horton Colorist(s): Matt Hollingsworth & Lee Loughridge	June 14, 2000 July 12, 2000	Hunting Ground Angel Omnibus (Dark Horse)
A murderer is leaving corpses across L.A. sewers, and the evidence found by Detective Kate Lockley suggests Angel is responsible. Angel does not know which demon or monster is trying to set him up. In the other story Cordelia lands the main role in a Blair Witch type film about three film makers looking for the Helm of Haraxis. However the film is a sham and the Helm's the real thing. Angel tries to rescue Cordelia and the other film makers. Collected in Angel: Hunting Ground.
10–11	"Strange Bedfellows"	Christopher Golden & Thomas E. Sniegoski	Penciller(s): Christian Zanier Inker(s): Andy Owens Colorist(s): Lee Loughridge	August 9, 2000 September 13, 2000	Strange Bedfellows Angel Omnibus (Dark Horse)
A Californian congressman is robbed and killed by a woman of the night, a front-page sleaze scandal emerges with a scary twist: Cordy has a vision of the congressman just before his death, it seems the prostitute who murdered him was not human. Angel must find the inhuman assassin. Detective Kate Lockley eventually becomes involved in the case, while Angel and Wesley continue their attempt to discover the vampire-prostitute known on the streets by the name of Candy. They find a vampire bordello controlled by an ancient and seductive vampire has her eyes on Angel. He must face both a large group of vampires, and a battle the much stronger force of lust. Set in the first season of Angel. Collected in Angel: Strange Bedfellows.
12–13	"Vermin"	Christopher Golden & Thomas E. Sniegoski	Penciller(s): Eric Powell & Christian Zanier Inker(s): Andy Owens, Andrew Pepoy, Mark Heike, Clayton Brown, Chris Ivy, Derek Fridolfs & Jason Moore Colorist(s): Lee Loughridge	October 11, 2000 November 8, 2000	Autumnal Angel Omnibus (Dark Horse)
14	"Little Girl Lost"	Christopher Golden & Thomas E. Sniegoski	Penciller(s): Eric Powell Inker(s): Jason Moore Colorist(s): Lee Loughridge	December 13, 2000	Autumnal Angel Omnibus (Dark Horse)
Angel looks in an abandoned amusement park to find and rescue a young girl from a gang of kidnappers. The thugs aren't the only things Angel face. Angel, the girl, and the criminals must fight their way past a huge number of demonic rats! It seems Angel has a dislike of the furry rodents. Angel later investigates a series of bizarre deaths which seem to be caused by spontaneous combustion. Angel soon associates the deaths with a teen runaway and a demon magic-user. Collected in Angel: Autumnal.
15–16	"Past Lives" (Parts 1 & 3, crossover with Buffy series)	Christopher Golden & Thomas E. Sniegoski	Penciller(s): Christian Zanier, Cliff Richards Inker(s): Joe Pimentel, Digital Jump Colorist(s): Lee Loughridge	January 17, 2001 February 2001	Past Lives BtVS Omnibus Vol. 6
A crossover with Buffy the Vampire Slayer issue #29–30 (collected in Buffy the Vampire Slayer: Past Lives). A huntress is tracking demons in L.A. This would normally seem to be a good thing, except leaving survivors to tell Angel that she sent them. Angel has a huge horde of demons trying to track him for revenge. His human friends, Cordelia and Wesley will soon no longer be safe, unless Angel can do something. At the same time monsters are leaving L.A. and trying to find refuge at Sunnydale. Buffy, Giles, and the others learn about recent chaos, and Buffy believes she should go to help Angel in L.A. Riley is displeased with such developments.
17	"Cordelia"	Christopher Golden & Thomas E. Sniegoski	Penciller(s): Eric Powell Inker(s): Jason Moore Colorist(s): Lee Loughridge	April 11, 2001	Strange Bedfellows Angel Omnibus (Dark Horse)
The Angel Investigations office has been blown up after the events of "To Shanshu in L.A.". The dark forces have discovered where Angel and Wesley live and are now forced to stash their demonic items at Cordy's haunted apartment. Dennis makes his presence felt. Collected in Angel: Strange Bedfellows.

=== Dark Horse Presents (2000) ===
#	Story	Writer(s)	Artist(s)	Release Date	Reprinted in
#153-155	"Angel: Lovely, Dark and Deep"	Christopher Golden & Thomas E. Sniegoski	Brian Horton & Paul Lee	April 19, 2000 May 17, 2000 July 5, 2000	Hunting Ground Angel Omnibus (Dark Horse)

=== Dark Horse Extra (2000) ===
#	Story	Writer(s)	Artist(s)	Release Date	Reprinted in
#25-28	"Angel: The Nepalese Switcheroo"	Scott Allie	Penciller(s): Eric Powell Inker(s): Eric Powell Colorist(s): Dave Stewart	July 5, 2000 August 2, 2000 August 30, 2000 October 4, 2000	Angel Omnibus (Dark Horse)

=== Angel mini-series (2002) ===
Promoted as "Angel retooled and reinvented" by Dark Horse Comics, the storyline represents an attempt to make Angel a comic-book hero in a more traditional sense, battling against huge behemoths of monsters, and they were the final Angel comics until IDW began publishing them in 2005. Not to be confused with the Angel episode, "Long Day's Journey", or the Angel novel, "The Longest Night".

Angel's searching for a kidnapped child, only to stumble upon a force of unspeakable evil and unimaginable power, seeking him for some reason. Angel ends up fighting a walking volcano, and must try and survive long enough to discover who or what is behind the recent strange series of events. Finally, the strange evil reveals itself; Perfect Zheng, a vampire who beat Angel up in the 1920s. Angel, Wesley, Cordelia, and Gunn try to put the pieces together in time to make sense of present events, a possible product of Angel's past encounter with Zheng. In fact, as it turns out, the gypsy curse that was used on Angel was meant to be used on Zheng, turning him into the 'vampire champion', but it didn't take, and Zheng is determined to find out why Angel's soul was restored and his wasn't. A battle for survival between the pair ensues, which Angel wins. Supposed to be set early in the second season of Angel. Collected in Angel: Long Night's Journey.

#	Title	Writer(s)	Artist(s)	Release Date	Reprinted in
1	"Long Night's Journey..."	Brett Matthews & Joss Whedon	Penciller(s): Mel Rubi Inker(s): Chris Dreier Colorist(s): Michelle Madsen & Dave Stewart	September 12, 2001	Long Night's Journey Angel Omnibus (Dark Horse)
2	"A Rock and a Hard Place"	Brett Matthews & Joss Whedon	Penciller(s): Mel Rubi Inker(s): Chris Dreier Colorist(s): Michelle Madsen & Dave Stewart	November 14, 2001	Long Night's Journey Angel Omnibus (Dark Horse)
3	"Thicker Than Water"	Brett Matthews & Joss Whedon	Penciller(s): Mel Rubi Inker(s): Chris Dreier Colorist(s): Michelle Madsen & Dave Stewart	February 6, 2002	Long Night's Journey Angel Omnibus (Dark Horse)
4	"The End of the Beginning"	Brett Matthews & Joss Whedon	Penciller(s): Mel Rubi Inker(s): Chris Dreier Colorist(s): Digital Chameleon	June 12, 2002	Long Night's Journey Angel Omnibus (Dark Horse)

=== Angel & Faith (2011-2017) ===
==== Volume 1 ====
Title	Issue #	Release date
"Live Through This, Part I"	1	August 31, 2011
Writer: Christos Gage		Penciller: Rebekah Isaacs
"Live Through This, Part II"	2	September 28, 2011
Writer: Christos Gage		Penciller: Rebekah Isaacs
"Live Through This, Part III"	3	October 26, 2011
Writer: Christos Gage		Penciller: Rebekah Isaacs
"Live Through This, Part IV"	4	November 30, 2011
Writer: Christos Gage		Penciller: Rebekah Isaacs
"In Perfect Harmony"	5	December 28, 2011
Writer: Christos Gage		Penciller: Phil Noto
"Daddy Issues, Part I"	6	January 25, 2012
Writer: Christos Gage		Penciller: Rebekah Isaacs
"Daddy Issues, Part II"	7	February 29, 2012
Writer: Christos Gage		Penciller: Rebekah Isaacs
"Daddy Issues, Part III"	8	March 28, 2012
Writer: Christos Gage		Penciller: Rebekah Isaacs
"Daddy Issues, Part IV"	9	April 25, 2012
Writer: Christos Gage		Penciller: Rebekah Isaacs
"Women of a Certain Age"	10	May 30, 2012
Writer: Christos Gage		Penciller: Chris Samnee
"Family Reunion, Part I"	11	June 27, 2012
Writer: Christos Gage		Penciller: Rebekah Isaacs
"Family Reunion, Part II"	12	July 25, 2012
Writer: Christos Gage		Penciller: Rebekah Isaacs
"Family Reunion, Part III"	13	August 29, 2012
Writer: Christos Gage		Penciller: Rebekah Isaacs
"Family Reunion, Part IV"	14	September 26, 2012
Writer: Christos Gage		Penciller: Rebekah Isaacs
"The Hero of His Own Story"	15	October 31, 2012
Writer: Christos Gage		Penciller: Lee Garbett
"Death and Consequences, Part I"	16	November 28, 2012
Writer: Christos Gage		Penciller: Rebekah Isaacs
"Death and Consequences, Part II"	17	December 19, 2012
Writer: Christos Gage		Penciller: Rebekah Isaacs
"Death and Consequences, Part III"	18	January 30, 2013
Writer: Christos Gage		Penciller: Rebekah Isaacs
"Death and Consequences, Part IV"	19	February 27, 2013
Writer: Christos Gage		Penciller: Rebekah Isaacs
"Spike and Faith"	20	March 27, 2013
Writer: Christos Gage		Penciller: Rebekah Isaacs
"What You Want, Not What You Need, Part I"	21	April 24, 2013
Writer: Christos Gage		Penciller: Rebekah Isaacs
"What You Want, Not What You Need, Part II"	22	May 29, 2013
Writer: Christos Gage		Penciller: Rebekah Isaacs
"What You Want, Not What You Need, Part III"	23	June 26, 2013
Writer: Christos Gage		Penciller: Rebekah Isaacs
"What You Want, Not What You Need, Part IV"	24	July 31, 2013
Writer: Christos Gage		Penciller: Rebekah Isaacs
"What You Want, Not What You Need, Part V"	25	August 28, 2013
Writer: Christos Gage		Penciller: Rebekah Isaacs

==== Volume 2 ====
Title	Issue #	Release date
"Where the River Meets the Sea, Part I"	1	April 2, 2014
Writer: Victor Gischler		Penciller: Will Conrad
"Where the River Meets the Sea, Part II"	2	May 7, 2014
Writer: Victor Gischler		Penciller: Will Conrad
"Where the River Meets the Sea, Part III"	3	June 4, 2014
Writer: Victor Gischler		Penciller: Will Conrad
"Where the River Meets the Sea, Part IV"	4	July 2, 2014
Writer: Victor Gischler		Penciller: Will Conrad
"Old Habits"	5	August 6, 2014
Writer: Victor Gischler		Penciller: Derlis Santacruz
"Lost & Found, Part I"	6	September 3, 2014
Writer: Victor Gischler		Penciller: Will Conrad
"Lost & Found, Part II"	7	October 1, 2014
Writer: Victor Gischler		Penciller: Will Conrad
"Lost & Found, Part III"	8	November 5, 2014
Writer: Victor Gischler		Penciller: Will Conrad
"Lost & Found, Part IV"	9	December 3, 2014
Writer: Victor Gischler		Penciller: Will Conrad
"Lost & Found Part V"	10	January 7, 2015
Writer: Victor Gischler		Penciller: Will Conrad
"United, Part I"	11	February 4, 2015
Writer: Victor Gischler		Penciller: Will Conrad
"United, Part II"	12	March 4, 2015
Writer: Victor Gischler		Penciller: Will Conrad
"United, Part III"	13	April 1, 2015
Writer: Victor Gischler		Penciller: Will Conrad
"United, Part IV"	14	May 6, 2015
Writer: Victor Gischler		Penciller: Will Conrad
"Fight or Flight"	15	June 3, 2015
Writer: Kel McDonald		Penciller: Cliff Richards
"Those Who Can't Teach, Teach Gym, Part I"	16	July 1, 2015
Writer: Victor Gischler		Penciller: Cliff Richards
"Those Who Can't Teach, Teach Gym, Part II"	17	August 5, 2015
Writer: Victor Gischler		Penciller: Cliff Richards
"Those Who Can't Teach, Teach Gym, Part III"	18	September 2, 2015
Writer: Victor Gischler		Penciller: Cliff Richards
"A Little More Than Kin, Part I"	19	October 7, 2015
Writer: Victor Gischler		Penciller: Will Conrad
"A Little More Than Kin, Part II"	20	November 4, 2015
Writer: Victor Gischler		Penciller: Will Conrad
"A Tale of Two Families, Part I"	21	December 2, 2015
Writer: Victor Gischler		Penciller: Will Conrad
"A Tale of Two Families, Part II"	22	January 6, 2016
Writer: Victor Gischler		Penciller: Will Conrad
"A Tale of Two Families, Part III"	23	February 3, 2016
Writer: Victor Gischler		Penciller: Will Conrad
"A Tale of Two Families, Part IV"	24	March 2, 2016
Writer: Victor Gischler		Penciller: Will Conrad
"A Tale of Two Families, Part V"	25	April 6, 2016
Writer: Victor Gischler		Penciller: Will Conrad

==== Volume 3 ====
Title	Issue #	Release date
"Out of the Past - Part I"	1	January 18, 2017
Writer: Corinna Bechko		Penciller: Geraldo Borges
"Out of the Past - Part II"	2	February 15, 2017
Writer: Corinna Bechko		Penciller: Geraldo Borges
"Out of the Past - Part III"	3	March 19, 2017
Writer: Corinna Bechko		Penciller: Geraldo Borges
"Out of the Past - Part IV"	4	April 19, 2017
Writer: Corinna Bechko		Penciller: Geraldo Borges
"Time and Tide - Part I"	5	May 24, 2017
Writer: Corinna Bechko		Penciller: Ze Carlos
"Time and Tide - Part II"	6	June 21, 2017
Writer: Corinna Bechko		Penciller: Ze Carlos
"Time and Tide - Part III"	7	July 19, 2017
Writer: Corinna Bechko		Penciller: Ze Carlos
"Time and Tide - Part IV"	8	August 30, 2017
Writer: Corinna Bechko		Penciller: Ze Carlos
"Dark Reflections - Part I"	9	September 27, 2017
Writer: Corinna Bechko		Penciller: Geraldo Borges
"Dark Reflections - Part II"	10	October 25, 2017
Writer: Corinna Bechko		Penciller: Geraldo Borges
"Dark Reflections - Part III"	11	November 22, 2017
Writer: Corinna Bechko		Penciller: Geraldo Borges
"Dark Reflections - Part IV"	12	December 20, 2017
Writer: Corinna Bechko		Penciller: Geraldo Borges

== IDW Publishing ==
IDW released various, loosely connected mini-series and one-shots before launching a new ongoing Angel series in late 2007.

=== Mini-series (2005-2010) ===
Title	Hikaye	Writer(s)	Artist(s)	Release Date	Reprinted in
"The Curse" (5 episodes)		Jeff Mariotte	Penciller(s): David Messina Inker(s): Andrea Fattori Colorist(s): Davide Amici	June 29, 2005	The Curse Angel Omnibus (IDW) Vol. 1
"The Curse" (5 episodes)		Jeff Mariotte	Penciller(s): David Messina Inker(s): Andrea Fattori Colorist(s): Davide Amici	July 13, 2005	The Curse Angel Omnibus (IDW) Vol. 1
"The Curse" (5 episodes)		Jeff Mariotte	Penciller(s): David Messina Inker(s): Andrea Fattori Colorist(s): Davide Amici	August 24, 2005	The Curse Angel Omnibus (IDW) Vol. 1
"The Curse" (5 episodes)		Jeff Mariotte	Penciller(s): David Messina Inker(s): Andrea Fattori Colorist(s): Davide Amici	September 28, 2005	The Curse Angel Omnibus (IDW) Vol. 1
"The Curse" (5 episodes)		Jeff Mariotte	Penciller(s): David Messina Inker(s): Andrea Fattori Colorist(s): Davide Amici	October 26, 2005	The Curse Angel Omnibus (IDW) Vol. 1
Having survived the battle of " Not Fade Away", we find Angel in Romania. He has traveled there in the hope he can find the Kalderesh clan, the Gypsies who cursed him with a soul. Angel believes that he deserves some happiness with a woman, possibly with Nina having been through so much and lost so many that had been close to him. Instead Angel finds a gypsy fighting force struggling against the oppressive regime of Corneliu Brasov.
"Old Friends" (5 episodes)		Jeff Mariotte	Penciller(s): David Messina 'Inker(s):' Elena Casagrande 'Colorist(s):' David Amici	November 2005	Old Friends Angel Omnibus (IDW) Vol. 1
"Old Friends" (5 episodes)		Jeff Mariotte	Penciller(s): David Messina 'Inker(s):' Elena Casagrande 'Colorist(s):' David Amici	January 11, 2006	Old Friends Angel Omnibus (IDW) Vol. 1
"Old Friends" (5 episodes)		Jeff Mariotte	Penciller(s): David Messina 'Inker(s):' Elena Casagrande 'Colorist(s):' David Amici	January 2006	Old Friends Angel Omnibus (IDW) Vol. 1
"Old Friends" (5 episodes)		Jeff Mariotte	Penciller(s): David Messina 'Inker(s):' Elena Casagrande 'Colorist(s):' David Amici	February 2006	Old Friends Angel Omnibus (IDW) Vol. 1
"Old Friends" (5 episodes)		Jeff Mariotte	Penciller(s): David Messina 'Inker(s):' Elena Casagrande 'Colorist(s):' David Amici	April 19, 2006	Old Friends Angel Omnibus (IDW) Vol. 1
This mini-series features the reunion of the Angel cast members after the events of the series finale, revealing some slim details of their fate; for example, Gunn has lost one eye. The group must ultimately face seemingly flawless clones of their own selves, created by Dr. Sparrow, one of the characters responsible for the death of Fred and rebirth of Illyria. After defeating Sparrow, the team agrees to work together again, and are set to continue fighting crime and the occult in Los Angeles.
"Spike vs. Dracula" (5 episodes)		Peter David	Penciller(s): Joe Corroney Inker(s): Joe Corroney & Jeff Dabu Colorist(s): Thompson Knox	February, 2006	Spike vs. Dracula Spike Omnibus
"Spike vs. Dracula" (5 episodes)		Peter David	Penciller(s): Joe Corroney Inker(s): Joe Corroney & Jeff Dabu Colorist(s): Thompson Knox	March 29, 2006	Spike vs. Dracula Spike Omnibus Spike: 100-Page Spectacular
"Spike vs. Dracula" (5 episodes)		Peter David	Penciller(s): Joe Corroney Inker(s): Joe Corroney & Jeff Dabu Colorist(s): Thomas Mason	May 24, 2006	Spike vs. Dracula Spike Omnibus
"Spike vs. Dracula" (5 episodes)		Peter David	Penciller(s): Joe Corroney & Mike Ratera Inker(s): Joe Corroney & Mike Ratera Colorist(s): Thompson Knox	July 26, 2006	Spike vs. Dracula Spike Omnibus
"Spike vs. Dracula" (5 episodes)		Peter David	Penciller(s): Zach Howard & Nicola Scott Inker(s): Zach Howard & Nicola Scott Colorist(s): Thompson Knox	August 9, 2006	Spike vs. Dracula Spike Omnibus
"Asylum" (5 episodes)		Brian Lynch	Penciller(s): Franco Urro Inker(s): Michael Heisler, Sulaco Studios, Neil Uyetake & Chris Mowry Colorist(s): Matteo Gherardi, Elena Virzi, Fabio Mantovan & Donatella Melchionno	September 27, 2006	Spike: Asylum Spike Omnibus
"Asylum" (5 episodes)		Brian Lynch	Penciller(s): Franco Urro Inker(s): Michael Heisler, Sulaco Studios, Neil Uyetake & Chris Mowry Colorist(s): Matteo Gherardi, Elena Virzi, Fabio Mantovan & Donatella Melchionno	October 4, 2006	Spike: Asylum Spike Omnibus Spike: 100-Page Spectacular
"Asylum" (5 episodes)		Brian Lynch	Penciller(s): Franco Urro Inker(s): Michael Heisler, Sulaco Studios, Neil Uyetake & Chris Mowry Colorist(s): Matteo Gherardi, Elena Virzi, Fabio Mantovan & Donatella Melchionno	November 20, 2006	Spike: Asylum Spike Omnibus
"Asylum" (5 episodes)		Brian Lynch	Penciller(s): Franco Urro Inker(s): Michael Heisler, Sulaco Studios, Neil Uyetake & Chris Mowry Colorist(s): Matteo Gherardi, Elena Virzi, Fabio Mantovan & Donatella Melchionno	December 20, 2006	Spike: Asylum Spike Omnibus
"Asylum" (5 episodes)		Brian Lynch	Penciller(s): Franco Urro Inker(s): Michael Heisler, Sulaco Studios, Neil Uyetake & Chris Mowry Colorist(s): Matteo Gherardi, Elena Virzi, Fabio Mantovan & Donatella Melchionno	February 7, 2007	Spike: Asylum Spike Omnibus
Ruby Monahan has gone missing and her family recruits Spike to track her down. It seems Ruby (a half-demon) has been checked into "Mosaic Wellness Center", a rehab facility designed to cure the demonic. In an unfortunate turn of events, Spike faces both the Mosaic Center, which hopes to cure his vampiric nature, and its clientele who want him dead.
"Auld Lang Syne" (5 episodes)		Scott Tipton	Penciller(s): Sulaco Studios Inker(s): David Messina Colorist(s): David Messina	November 2006	Auld Lang Syne Angel Omnibus (IDW) Vol. 1
"Auld Lang Syne" (5 episodes)		Scott Tipton	Penciller(s): Sulaco Studios Inker(s): David Messina Colorist(s): Ilaria Traversi	December 2006	Auld Lang Syne Angel Omnibus (IDW) Vol. 1
"Auld Lang Syne" (5 episodes)		Scott Tipton	Penciller(s): Sulaco Studios Inker(s): Elena Casagrande & David Messina Colorist(s): Studio 42	January 2007	Auld Lang Syne Angel Omnibus (IDW) Vol. 1
"Auld Lang Syne" (5 episodes)		Scott Tipton	Penciller(s): Robbie Robbins Inker(s): David Messina Colorist(s): David Messina	February 7, 2007	Auld Lang Syne Angel Omnibus (IDW) Vol. 1
"Auld Lang Syne" (5 episodes)		Scott Tipton	Penciller(s): David Messina Inker(s): David Messina Colorist(s): David Messina	March 14, 2007	Auld Lang Syne Angel Omnibus (IDW) Vol. 1
Angel has taken up his job in L.A. again, but is quickly faced by mysterious figures from his past, and they seem to be quite real. Similarly, Spike is faced by the ghosts of his pasts, and the two accidentally meet each other, placing the blame for the occurrence with the other. A fight ensues, but they soon discover that they are being manipulated and are forced to work together again. The culprit turns out to be a demon both men have wronged in the past, who hoped they would kill one another. Angel and Spike are able to defeat her however, and both go their own ways again. Features the IDW comics debuts of Skip, Holtz, The Master, Nikki Wood and the Chinese Slayer (Xin Rong).
"Shadow Puppets" (4 episodes)	"Once More, With Felt"	Brian Lynch	Penciller(s): Franco Urru Inker(s): Franco Urru Colorist(s): Ilaria Traversi & Donatella Melchionno	June 20, 2007	Spike: Shadow Puppets Smile Time Spike: Omnibus
"Shadow Puppets" (4 episodes)	"Plush"	Brian Lynch	Penciller(s): Franco Urru Inker(s): Franco Urru Colorist(s): Ilaria Traversi & Donatella Melchionno	July 18, 2007	Spike: Shadow Puppets Smile Time Spike: Omnibus
"Shadow Puppets" (4 episodes)	"Two to Sew"	Brian Lynch	Penciller(s): Franco Urru Inker(s): Franco Urru Colorist(s): Ilaria Traversi & Donatella Melchionno	August 15, 2007	Spike: Shadow Puppets Smile Time Spike: Omnibus
"Shadow Puppets" (4 episodes)	"Doppelgangbang"	Brian Lynch	Penciller(s): Franco Urru Inker(s): Franco Urru Colorist(s): Ilaria Traversi & Donatella Melchionno	October 3, 2007	Spike: Shadow Puppets Smile Time Spike: Omnibus
"Smile Time" (3 episodes)		Scott Tipton	Penciller(s): Neil Uyetake Inker(s): David Messina & Elena Casagrande Colorist(s): Giovanna Niro	December 2008	Smile Time Angel Omnibus (IDW) Vol. 2
"Smile Time" (3 episodes)		Scott Tipton	Penciller(s): Neil Uyetake Inker(s): David Messina & Elena Casagrande Colorist(s): Giovanna Niro	February 18, 2009	Smile Time Angel Omnibus (IDW) Vol. 2
"Smile Time" (3 episodes)		Scott Tipton	Penciller(s): Neil Uyetake Inker(s): David Messina & Elena Casagrande Colorist(s): Giovanna Niro	April 15, 2009	Smile Time Angel Omnibus (IDW) Vol. 2
"Blood and Trenches" (4 episodes)	"Over There"	John Byrne	Penciller(s): John Byrne 'Inker(s):' John Byrne 'Colorist(s):' John Byrne	March 11, 2009	Blood and Trenches Angel: The John Byrne Collection
"Blood and Trenches" (4 episodes)	"Front Lines"	John Byrne	Penciller(s): John Byrne 'Inker(s):' John Byrne 'Colorist(s):' John Byrne	April 1, 2009	Blood and Trenches Angel: The John Byrne Collection
"Blood and Trenches" (4 episodes)	"Interlude"	John Byrne	Penciller(s): John Byrne 'Inker(s):' John Byrne 'Colorist(s):' John Byrne	May 6, 2009	Blood and Trenches Angel: The John Byrne Collection
"Blood and Trenches" (4 episodes)	"Monsters"	John Byrne	Penciller(s): John Byrne 'Inker(s):' John Byrne 'Colorist(s):' John Byrne	June 10, 2009	Blood and Trenches Angel: The John Byrne Collection
In Europe, war ravages nations, but a greater darkness than human conflict calls Angel back across the ocean from his distant home in America – bodies of combatants found drained of blood, and signs of an ancient evil once more abroad in the world.
"Fallen Angel: Reborn" (4 episodes)		Peter David	Penciller(s): J. K. Woodward Colorist(s): J. K. Woodward	July 15, 2009	–
"Fallen Angel: Reborn" (4 episodes)		Peter David	Penciller(s): J. K. Woodward Colorist(s): J. K. Woodward	August 5, 2009	–
"Fallen Angel: Reborn" (4 episodes)		Peter David	Penciller(s): J. K. Woodward Colorist(s): J. K. Woodward	September 10, 2009	–
"Fallen Angel: Reborn" (4 episodes)		Peter David	Penciller(s): J. K. Woodward Colorist(s): J. K. Woodward	October 1, 2009	–
"Not Fade Away" (3 episodes)		Scott Tipton	Penciller(s): Steven Mooney Colorist(s): Ciaran Lucas	October 21, 2009	Not Fade Away Angel Omnibus (IDW) Vol. 2
"A Hole in the World" (5 episodes)		Scott Tipton	Elena Casagrande	December 2009	A Hole in the World Angel Omnibus (IDW) Vol. 2
"A Hole in the World" (5 episodes)		Scott Tipton	Elena Casagrande	January 2010	A Hole in the World Angel Omnibus (IDW) Vol. 2
"A Hole in the World" (5 episodes)		Scott Tipton	Elena Casagrande	February 2010	A Hole in the World Angel Omnibus (IDW) Vol. 2
"A Hole in the World" (5 episodes)		Scott Tipton	Elena Casagrande	March 2010	A Hole in the World Angel Omnibus (IDW) Vol. 2
"A Hole in the World" (5 episodes)		Scott Tipton	Elena Casagrande	April 2010	A Hole in the World Angel Omnibus (IDW) Vol. 2
"Barbary Coast" (3 episodes)		David Tischman	Penciller(s): Franco Urru Inker(s): Franco Urru Colorist(s): Andrea Priorini	April 14, 2010	Barbary Coast Angel Omnibus (IDW) Vol. 2
"Barbary Coast" (3 episodes)		David Tischman	Penciller(s): Franco Urru Inker(s): Franco Urru Colorist(s): Andrea Priorini	May 5, 2010	Barbary Coast Angel Omnibus (IDW) Vol. 2
"Barbary Coast" (3 episodes)		David Tischman	Penciller(s): Franco Urru Inker(s): Franco Urru Colorist(s): Andrea Priorini	June 16, 2010	Barbary Coast Angel Omnibus (IDW) Vol. 2
A recently souled Angel is on a quest for a "cure" in San Francisco when, of course, something goes horribly wrong. Seeking out a Chinese healer, Angel encounters a mysterious girl with a strange tattoo, and quickly learns that life in early 1900s America is full of surprises...

=== One-shots (2005–2010) ===
Title	Hikaye	Writer(s)	Artist(s)	Release Date	Reprinted in
"Spike: Old Times"		Peter David	Penciller(s): Fernando Goni Inker(s): Impacto Studios Colorist(s): Impacto Studios	August 24, 2005	Spike Spike Omnibus
"Spike: Old Wounds"		Scott Tipton	Penciller(s): Fernando Goni Inker(s): Impacto Studios Colorist(s): Impacto Studios	February 8, 2006	Spike Spike Omnibus
A retired L.A. detective arrives at Wolfram and Hart and says that Spike had been responsible for a murder that took place decades previously. Spike attempts to solve one of the most infamous unsolved crimes that has taken place in LA history. Meanwhile, there are various monster-slayings for the gang to solve.
"Spike: Lost and Found"		Scott Tipton	Penciller(s): Fernando Goni Inker(s): Impacto Studios Colorist(s): Impacto Studios	April, 2006	Spike Spike Omnibus
A vampire is preying on citizens of Los Angeles in broad daylight making it particularly difficult for Angel and Spike to deal with. Meanwhile, Spike finds himself thinking about some of his evil actions in some new found guilt. The story features a second Ring of Amarra, the ring that grants vampires virtual indestructibility, the subject of the Buffy/Angel television crossover "The Harsh Light of Day"/"In the Dark".
"Angel: Masks"	"Mystery Date" (Puppet Angel story)	Jeff Mariotte	Penciller(s): Stephen Mooney Inker(s): Stephen Mooney Colorist(s): Ronda Pattison	October 25, 2006	Masks Smile Time
"Angel: Masks"	"Unacceptable Losses" (Illyria story)	Scott Tipton	Penciller(s): David Messina Inker(s): David Messina Colorist(s): David Messina	October 25, 2006	Masks Angel Omnibus (IDW) Vol. 2
"Angel: Masks"	"Foreshadowing" (Cordelia story)	Christopher Golden	Penciller(s): Steph Stamb Inker(s): Steph Stamb Colorist(s): Steph Stamb	October 25, 2006	Masks
"Angel: Masks"	"Pencils and Paperclips" (Lindsey story)	James Patrick	Penciller(s): Sean Murphy Inker(s): Sean Murphy Colorist(s): Rico Renzi	October 25, 2006	Masks
This issue is a one-shot Halloween-themed annual featuring four special stories. The stories featured are "Mystery Date", concerning Angel, "Unacceptable Losses, with Illyria, "Foreshadowing", about Cordelia and finally "Pencils and Paperclips", detailing a story about Lindsey.
"Angel vs. Frankenstein"		John Byrne	John Byrne	October 21, 2009	Angel: The John Byrne Collection
"Angel vs. Frankenstein ||"		John Byrne	John Byrne	October 6, 2010	Angel: The John Byrne Collection

=== Angel: Spotlight (2006) ===
A series of spotlight issues focussing on one character's motivations (although they are sometimes assisted by an additional character). Each one-shot featured a number of variant covers, illustrated by Russell Walks, Lee Kohse, Steph Stamb or was a retailer incentive photo.

Title	Writer(s)	Artist(s)	Release Date	Reprinted in
"Illyria"	Peter David	Nicola Scott	April 2006	Angel: Spotlight
Illyria, an Old One who has only recently been reintroduced to its life, tries to further understand humanity by studying the vessel whom it now occupies, Fred. Illyria considers whether she is capable of guilt. Peter David's wife Kathleen revealed her contribution to the story on David's official web site: "My idea has to do with locking up a criminal with pictures of his victims and the only thing on his/her TV are videos of the lives of the people they killed/destroyed so they have to face what they did every day of their lives for the rest of their lives. I think this is most of a just punishment than killing the individual."
"Gunn"	Dan Jolley	Mark Pennington Howard, Stamb & Walks	May 2006	Angel: Spotlight
Gunn's naive cousin ends up in L.A. having run away from his home in Ohio. Gunn must try to find him before the city chews him up and spits him out. This is the first comic to feature Gunn as a main character.
"Wesley"	Scott Tipton	Mike Norton & Tom B. Long	June 2006	Angel: Spotlight
An extreme legal measure in the form of a lethal venom strikes down Knox, the current object of Winifred Burkle's affections. Forced to make a choice between letting Knox die or saving his life, Wesley deals with his own affections for Fred and their ramifications. The title of Wesley's story is "No Sacrifice".
"Doyle"	Jeff Mariotte	David Messina	July 2006	Angel: Spotlight
Set just before the very first episode of Angel, this story focuses on Doyle as he wanders the streets of L.A., depressed and isolated. After receiving a vision about a young woman he knows named Misty, showing that she is in grave danger, he rushes to try to save her from a grisly fate.
"Connor"	Jay Faerber	Bob Gill, David Messina, Steph Stamb & Russell Walks	August 2006	Angel: Spotlight
As Connor tries to work on a genealogy project as part of one of his college courses, his town is experiencing a widespread surge in vigilantism, in which suspected criminals are being killed. Connor suspects that he might be to blame, fearing that he may be killing these criminals in his sleep. The title of Connor's story is "Inheritance".

=== After the Fall (2007-2011) ===
==== Episodes ====
#	Title	Writer(s)	Artist(s)	Release Date	Reprinted in
1	"After the Fall, Part One"	Brian Lynch & Joss Whedon	Penciller(s): Franco Urru Inker(s): Franco Urru Colorist(s): Ilaria Traversi	November 21, 2007	Angel: After the Fall (Part One) Angel: After the Fall (Premiere Edition) Angel: Season Six, Vol. 1
2	"After the Fall, Part Two"	Brian Lynch & Joss Whedon	Penciller(s): Franco Urru Inker(s): Franco Urru Colorist(s): Ilaria Traversi	December 19, 2007	Angel: After the Fall (Part One) Angel: After the Fall (Premiere Edition) Angel: Season Six, Vol. 1
3	"After the Fall, Part Three"	Brian Lynch & Joss Whedon	Penciller(s): Franco Urru Inker(s): Franco Urru Colorist(s): Ilaria Traversi	January 14, 2008	Angel: After the Fall (Part One) Angel: After the Fall (Premiere Edition) Angel: Season Six, Vol. 1
4	"After the Fall, Part Four"	Brian Lynch & Joss Whedon	Penciller(s): Franco Urru Inker(s): Franco Urru Colorist(s): Jason Jensen	February 20, 2008	Angel: After the Fall (Part One) Angel: After the Fall (Premiere Edition) Angel: Season Six, Vol. 1
5	"After the Fall, Part Five"	Brian Lynch & Joss Whedon	Penciller(s): Franco Urru Inker(s): Franco Urru Colorist(s): Jason Jensen & Art Lyon	March 19, 2008	Angel: After the Fall (Part One) Angel: After the Fall (Premiere Edition) Angel: Season Six, Vol. 1
6	"First Night, Part One"	Brian Lynch & Joss Whedon	Penciller(s): John Byrne, David Messina, Stephen Mooney & Tim Kane Inker(s): John Byrne, David Messina, Stephen Mooney & Tim Kane Colorist(s): Lisa Jackson, Len O'Grady, Ilaria Traversi & Tim Kane	April 2, 2008	Angel: First Night (Part Two) Angel: After the Fall (Premiere Edition) Angel: Season Six, Vol. 1
7	"First Night, Part Two"	Brian Lynch & Joss Whedon	Penciller(s): Tim Kane, Stephen Mooney & Nick Runge Inker(s): Tim Kane, Stephen Mooney & Nick Runge Colorist(s): Lisa Jackson, John Rauch & Jeremy Treece	May 7, 2008	Angel: First Night (Part Two) Angel: After the Fall (Premiere Edition) Angel: Season Six, Vol. 1
8	"First Night, Part Three"	Brian Lynch, Joss Whedon & Scott Tipton	Penciller(s): Tim Kane, Fabio Mantovani, Mirco Pierfederici & Kevyn Schmidt Inker(s): Tim Kane, Fabio Mantovani, Mirco Pierfederici & Kevyn Schmidt Colorist(s): Michele Buscalferri, Fabio Mantovani & Jeremy Treece	June 11, 2008	Angel: First Night (Part Two) Angel: After the Fall (Premiere Edition) Angel: Season Six, Vol. 1
9	"After the Fall, Part Nine"	Brian Lynch & Joss Whedon	Penciller(s): Nick Runge Inker(s): Nick Runge & Shaynne Corbett Colorist(s): Art Lyon	June 18, 2008	Angel: After the Fall (Part Three) Angel: After the Fall (Premiere Edition) Angel: Season Six, Vol. 1
10	"After the Fall, Part Ten"	Brian Lynch & Joss Whedon	Penciller(s): David Messina & Nick Runge Inker(s): Shaynne Corbett Colorist(s): Art Lyon	July 2, 2008	Angel: After the Fall (Part Three) Angel: After the Fall (Premiere Edition) Angel: Season Six, Vol. 1
11	"After the Fall, Part Eleven"	Brian Lynch & Joss Whedon	Penciller(s): Nick Runge Inker(s): Shaynne Corbett Colorist(s): Jason Jensen	August 13, 2008	Angel: After the Fall (Part Three) Angel: After the Fall (Premiere Edition) Angel: Season Six, Vol. 1
12	"After the Fall, Part Twelve"	Brian Lynch & Joss Whedon	Penciller(s): Stephen Mooney & Nick Runge Inker(s): Stephen Mooney & Nick Runge Colorist(s): Art Lyon	September 4, 2008	Angel: After the Fall (Part Three) Angel: After the Fall (Premiere Edition) Angel: Season Six, Vol. 1
13	"After the Fall, Part Thirteen"	Brian Lynch & Joss Whedon	Penciller(s): Franco Urru Inker(s): Franco Urru Colorist(s): Ilaria Traversi	October 22, 2008	Angel: After the Fall (Part Four) Angel: After the Fall (Premiere Edition) Angel: Season Six, Vol. 2
14	"After the Fall, Part Fourteen"	Brian Lynch & Joss Whedon	Penciller(s): Stephen Mooney Inker(s): Stephen Mooney Colorist(s): Art Lyon	November 19, 2008	Angel: After the Fall (Part Four) Angel: After the Fall (Premiere Edition) Angel: Season Six, Vol. 2
15	"After the Fall, Part Fifteen"	Brian Lynch & Joss Whedon	Penciller(s): Franco Urru Inker(s): Franco Urru Colorist(s): Fabio Mantovani	December 17, 2008	Angel: After the Fall (Part Four) Angel: After the Fall (Premiere Edition) Angel: Season Six, Vol. 2
16	"After the Fall, Part Sixteen"	Brian Lynch & Joss Whedon	Penciller(s): Franco Urru Inker(s): Franco Urru Colorist(s): Fabio Mantovani	January 21, 2009	Angel: After the Fall (Part Four) Angel: After the Fall (Premiere Edition) Angel: Season Six, Vol. 2
17	"After the Fall, Part Seventeen"	Brian Lynch & Joss Whedon	Penciller(s): Franco Urru Inker(s): Franco Urru Colorist(s): Fabio Mantovani, Federica Manfredi & Mirco Pierfederici	February 11, 2009	Angel: After the Fall (Part Four) Angel: After the Fall (Premiere Edition) Angel: Season Six, Vol. 2
18–22	"Aftermath" (5 episodes)	Kelley Armstrong	Penciller(s): Dave Ross Colorist(s): Charlie Kirchoff	February 25, 2009 March 25, 2009 April 29, 2009 May 20, 2009 June 24, 2009	Angel: Aftermath (Part Five) Angel: Season Six, Vol. 2
23	"Become What You Are"	Brian Lynch	Penciller(s): Franco Urru Colorist(s): Fabio Mantovani & Paolo Maddelini	July 1, 2009	Angel: Last Angel in Hell (Part Six) Angel: Season Six, Vol. 2
24–25	"Drusilla" (2 episodes)	Brian Lynch & Juliet Landau	Franco Urru	August 5, 2009 September 16, 2009	Angel: Last Angel in Hell (Part Six) Angel: Season Six, Vol. 2
26–27	"Boys and Their Toys" (2 episodes)	Brian Lynch	Stephen Mooney	October 7, 2009 November 4, 2009	Angel: Last Angel in Hell (Part Six) Angel: Season Six, Vol. 2
28	"The Crown Prince Syndrome"	Bill Willingham	Brian Denham	December 16, 2009	Immortality for Dummies The End
29	"Immortality for Dummies"	Bill Willingham	Brian Denham	January 13, 2010	Immortality for Dummies The End
30	"The Trouble With Felicia"	Bill Willingham	Brian Denham	February 24, 2010	Immortality for Dummies The End
31	"The Big Dustup"	Bill Willingham	Brian Denham	March 17, 2010	Immortality for Dummies The End
32	"Roman a Clef"	Bill Willingham	Brian Denham	April 28, 2010	Immortality for Dummies The End
33	"Letters Home: A Jamesian Interlude"	Bill Willingham	Brian Denham	May 26, 2010	Crown Prince Syndrome The End
34	"Bedroom Follies"	Bill Willingham	Brian Denham	June 30, 2010	Crown Prince Syndrome The End
35	"Prophet for Profit" (3 episodes)	Bill Willingham	Elena Casagrande	July 28, 2010	Crown Prince Syndrome The End
36	"Prophet for Profit" (3 episodes)	David Tischman & Mariah Huehner	Elena Casagrande	August, 2010	Crown Prince Syndrome The End
37	"Prophet for Profit" (3 episodes)	David Tischman & Mariah Huehner	Elena Casagrande	September, 2010	Crown Prince Syndrome The End
38	"Cats in the Cradle"	David Tischman & Mariah Huehner	Elena Casagrande	October, 2010	Crown Prince Syndrome The End
39–44	"The Wolf, the Ram, and the Heart" (6 episodes)	David Tischman & Mariah Huehner	Elena Casagrande	November, 2010 December, 2010 January, 2011 February, 2011 March, 2011 April, 2011	The Wolf, the Ram, and the Heart The End

==== Mini-series ====
Title	Story	Writer(s)	Artist(s)	Release Date	Reprinted in
"Spike: After the Fall" (4 episodes)		Brian Lynch	Penciller(s): Franco Urru Inker(s): Franco Urru Colorist(s): Art Lyon, Tom Smith & Jason Jensen	July 16, 2008	Spike: After the Fall Angel: Season Six, Vol. 1
"Spike: After the Fall" (4 episodes)		Brian Lynch	Penciller(s): Franco Urru Inker(s): Franco Urru Colorist(s): Art Lyon, Tom Smith & Jason Jensen	August 6, 2008	Spike: After the Fall Angel: Season Six, Vol. 1
"Spike: After the Fall" (4 episodes)		Brian Lynch	Penciller(s): Franco Urru Inker(s): Franco Urru Colorist(s): Art Lyon, Tom Smith & Jason Jensen	September 17, 2008	Spike: After the Fall Angel: Season Six, Vol. 1
"Spike: After the Fall" (4 episodes)		Brian Lynch	Penciller(s): Franco Urru Inker(s): Franco Urru Colorist(s): Art Lyon, Tom Smith & Jason Jensen	October 29, 2008	Spike: After the Fall Angel: Season Six, Vol. 1
"Only Human" (5 episodes)		Scott Lobdell	Penciller(s): David Messina Inker(s): David Messina Colorist(s): Mirco Pierfederici, Ilaria Traversi & Andrea Priorini	August 12, 2009	Only Human
"Only Human" (5 episodes)		Scott Lobdell	Penciller(s): David Messina & Emanuela Lupacchino Inker(s): Gaetano Carlucci Colorist(s): Ilaria Traversi & Andrea Priorini	September 10, 2009	Only Human
"Only Human" (5 episodes)		Scott Lobdell	Penciller(s): David Messina Inker(s): Gaetano Carlucci Colorist(s): Ilaria Traversi & Andrea Priorini	October 14, 2009	Only Human
"Only Human" (5 episodes)		Scott Lobdell	Penciller(s): David Messina Inker(s): Gaetano Carlucci Colorist(s): Ilaria Traversi & Andrea Priorini	November 18, 2009	Only Human
"Only Human" (5 episodes)		Scott Lobdell	Penciller(s): David Messina Inker(s): Gaetano Carlucci Colorist(s): Ilaria Traversi & Andrea Priorini	December 23, 2009	Only Human
"The Devil You Know" (4 episodes)		Bill Williams	Penciller(s): Chriss Cross & José Maria Beroy Inker(s): Chriss Cross & José Maria Beroy Colorist(s): Felix Serano, Ronda Pattison & Charlie Kirchoff	June, 2010	Spike: The Devil You Know
"The Devil You Know" (4 episodes)		Bill Williams	Penciller(s): Chriss Cross & José Maria Beroy Inker(s): Chriss Cross & José Maria Beroy Colorist(s): Felix Serano, Ronda Pattison & Charlie Kirchoff	July, 2010	Spike: The Devil You Know
"The Devil You Know" (4 episodes)		Bill Williams	Penciller(s): Chriss Cross & José Maria Beroy Inker(s): Chriss Cross & José Maria Beroy Colorist(s): Felix Serano, Ronda Pattison & Charlie Kirchoff	August, 2010	Spike: The Devil You Know
"The Devil You Know" (4 episodes)		Bill Williams	Penciller(s): Chriss Cross & José Maria Beroy Inker(s): Chriss Cross & José Maria Beroy Colorist(s): Felix Serano, Ronda Pattison & Charlie Kirchoff	September, 2010	Spike: The Devil You Know
"Spike" (8 episodes)	"Alone Together Now"	Brian Lynch	Penciller(s): Franco Urru Inker(s): Franco Urru Colorist(s): Andrea Priorini	October 13, 2010	Spike
"Spike" (8 episodes)	"What Happens in Vegas, Slays in Vegas"	Brian Lynch	Penciller(s): Franco Urru & Nicola Zanni Inker(s): Franco Urru & Nicola Zanni Colorist(s): Andrea Priorini	November 10, 2010	Spike
"Spike" (8 episodes)	"Everybody Loves Spike"	Brian Lynch	Penciller(s): Nicola Zanni Inker(s): Nicola Zanni Colorist(s): Andrea Priorini	December 8, 2010	Spike
"Spike" (8 episodes)	"You Haven't Changed A Bit"	Brian Lynch	Penciller(s): Nicola Zanni Inker(s): Nicola Zanni Colorist(s): Andrea Priorini	January 5, 2011	Spike
"Spike" (8 episodes)	"Bedknobs and Boomsticks"	Brian Lynch	Penciller(s): Stephen Mooney Inker(s): Stephen Mooney Colorist(s): Andrea Priorini	February 23, 2011	Spike
"Spike" (8 episodes)	"Something Borrowed"	Brian Lynch	Penciller(s): Stephen Mooney Inker(s): Stephen Mooney Colorist(s): Andrea Priorini	March 16, 2011	Spike
"Spike" (8 episodes)	"Give And Take"	Brian Lynch	Penciller(s): Stephen Mooney Inker(s): Stephen Mooney Colorist(s): Andrea Priorini	April 13, 2011	Spike
"Spike" (8 episodes)	"Stranger Things"	Brian Lynch	Penciller(s): Franco Urru Inker(s): Franco Urru Colorist(s): Fabio Mantovani	May 4, 2011	Spike
"Illyra: Haunted" (4 episodes)		Scott Tipton & Mariah Huehner	Penciller(s): Elena Casagrande Inker(s): Walter Trono Colorist(s): Illyria Traversi	November 10, 2010	Illyria: Haunted
"Illyra: Haunted" (4 episodes)		Scott Tipton & Mariah Huehner	Penciller(s): Elena Casagrande Inker(s): Walter Trono Colorist(s): Illyria Traversi	December 22, 2010	Illyria: Haunted
"Illyra: Haunted" (4 episodes)		Scott Tipton & Mariah Huehner	Penciller(s): Elena Casagrande Inker(s): Walter Trono Colorist(s): Illyria Traversi	January 26, 2011	Illyria: Haunted
"Illyra: Haunted" (4 episodes)		Scott Tipton & Mariah Huehner	Penciller(s): Elena Casagrande Inker(s): Walter Trono Colorist(s): Illyria Traversi	March 2, 2011	Illyria: Haunted

==== One-shots ====
Title	Story	Writer(s)	Artist(s)	Release Date	Reprinted in
"Last Angel in Hell"		Brian Lynch	Penciller(s): Stephen Mooney Inker(s): Stephen Mooney Colorist(s): Leonard O'Grady	December 1, 2009	Angel: Season Six, Vol. 2
"Lorne"	"The Music of the Spheres"	John Byrne	Penciller(s): John Byrne Inker(s): John Byrne Colorist(s): Rhonda Pattison	March 24, 2010	Angel: The John Byrne Collection
"Angel Yearbook"	"...Dust to Dust"	Jeff Mariotte	David Messina	May 25, 2011	The End
"Angel Yearbook"	"OMG Unicorns!"	Peter David	Stephen Mooney	May 25, 2011	The End
"Angel Yearbook"	"All the Time in the World"	Scott Tipton	Elena Casagrande	May 25, 2011	The End
"Angel Yearbook"	"My Only Friend"	Patrick Shand	Stephen Mooney	May 25, 2011	The End
"Angel Yearbook"	"Fight for the Remote!"	Daniel Roth	Stephen Mooney	May 25, 2011	The End
"Angel Yearbook"	"This One Time"	Brian Lynch	Franco Urru	May 25, 2011	The End

==== Trade Paperbacks ====
- Angel: After the Fall (Part One)
- Angel: First Night (Part Two)
- Angel: After the Fall (Part Three)
- Angel: After the Fall (Part Four)
- Angel: After the Fall (Premiere Edition)
- Angel: Aftermath (Part Five)
- Angel: Last Angel in Hell (Part Six)
- Immortality for Dummies
- Crown Prince Syndrome
- The Wolf, the Ram, and the Heart
- The End
- Only Human
- Spike: After the Fall
- Spike: The Devil You Know
- llyria: Haunted
- Angel: Season Six, Vol. 1

== BOOM! Studios (2019–2020) ==
In 2019, a new Angel comic book series was released by Boom! Studios; this version of the series is a reboot with no continuity to the television series or previous comics.

=== Angel (2019) ===
#	Title	Writer(s)	Artist(s)	Release Date	Reprinted in
0	Prologue	Bryan Edward Hill	Gleb Melnikov	April 17, 2019	Angel: Being Human
1-4	Being Human (4 episodes)	Bryan Edward Hill	Gleb Melnikov	May 29, 2019; June 26, 2019; July 31, 2019; August 28, 2019	Angel: Being Human
5-8	City of Demons (4 episodes)	Bryan Edward Hill	Gleb Melnikov	September 25, 2019; October 23, 2019; November 27, 2019; December 12, 2019	Angel: City of Demons

=== Angel & Spike (2020) ===
#	Title	Writer(s)	Artist(s)	Release Date	Reprinted in
9-12	All The Devils Are Here (4 episodes)	Bryan Edward Hill	Gleb Melnikov	February 26, 2020; March 25, 2020; June 24, 2020; July 22, 2020	Angel & Spike: All The Devils Are Here
13-16	What's Done is Denied (4 episodes)	Adam Smith	Piotr Kowalski	August 26, 2020	Angel & Spike: What's Done is Denied
13-16	What's Done is Denied (4 episodes)	Zac Thompson	Hayden Sherman	September 23, 2020; October 28, 2020; November 25, 2020	Angel & Spike: What's Done is Denied

=== Angel (2022) ===
#	Title	Writer(s)	Artist(s)	Release Date	Reprinted in
1-4	Parallel Hell (4 episodes)	Christopher Cantwell	Daniel Bayliss	January 19, 2022; February 16, 2022; March 16, 2022; April 20, 2022	Angel: Parallel Hell
5-8	City of Angelus (4 episodes)	Christopher Cantwell	Daniel Bayliss	May 18, 2022 June 15, 2022 July 20, 2022 August 17, 2022	Angel: City of Angelus

== Trade Paperbacks ==
=== Dark Horse Comics ===
- Surrogates
- Earthly Possessions
- Hunting Ground
- Autumnal
- Strange Bedfellows
- The Hollower
- Angel Omnibus

=== IDW Publishing ===
- The Curse
- Old Friends
- Auld Lang Syne
- Shadow Puppets
- Smile Time
- Blood and Trenches
- Not Fade Away
- A Hole in the World
- Barbary Coast
- Masks
- Angel: Spotlight
- Angel Omnibus Vol. 1
- Angel Omnibus Vol. 2
- Angel: The John Byrne Collection
- Spike
- Spike vs. Dracula
- Spike: 100-Page Spectacular
- Spike: Asylum
- Spike Omnibus

=== BOOM! Studios ===
- Being Human
- City of Demons
- All the Devils Are Here
- What's Done is Denied
- Parallel Hell
