= Star Trek: Countdown =

Comic book series

- Advert for Countdown displaying the cover of each issue. Clockwise: Nero, Data, Picard, and Spock.

Publication information
- Publisher: IDW Publishing
- Schedule: Monthly
- Format: Limited series
- Genre: Science fiction
- Publication date: January–April 2009
- No. of issues: 4

Creative team
- Created by: Gene Roddenberry
- Written by: Script: Mike Johnson; Tim Jones; Plot: Roberto Orci; Alex Kurtzman
- Artist: David Messina
- Letterer(s): Chris Mowry; Neil Uyetake
- Colorist(s): Paolo Maddaleni; Giovanna Niro; Ilaria Traversi
- Editor: Andy Schmidt

Collected editions
- Star Trek: Countdown: ISBN 1-60010-420-7

Star Trek: Countdown is a four-issue comic book prequel to the 2009 film Star Trek by IDW Publishing. It follows the characters of Spock and the Romulan Nero during the year 2387, detailing the events that cause them to travel to the 23rd century. The story serves as both a lead up to the film, and as a continuation of the Star Trek: The Next Generation franchise.

== Publication history ==
The comic came about because Anthony Pascale, editor of TrekMovie.com, kept requesting to the film's co-writer Roberto Orci a way of having The Next Generation characters "pass the baton" back to the originals.

Writers Tim Jones and Mike Johnson were fans of The Next Generation and worked for Orci and Kurtzman's production company. They were allowed to read parts of the script and watch parts of the film to understand Nero more. They chose to give his Romulan crew informal dialogue to reflect that they are miners, not politicians or warriors. In figuring out where The Next Generation characters would be eight years after Star Trek: Nemesis, Jones and Johnson decided if Picard had left the Enterprise, then Data – whose resurrection in B-4's body was heavily hinted at the end of Nemesis – would become captain since he is Starfleet's most capable strategist. The writers made an error of Spock stating he had lived on Romulus for forty years, which the writers tried to explain by saying Spock might have visited the planet before "Unification". The word forty was later changed to twenty in the trade paperback.

The Starfleet uniforms seen in the comic resemble those developed for Star Trek Online. Cryptic Studios is tying into the comic by including Picard's promotion to ambassador to Vulcan and Data's resurrection and promotion in the backstory to its game. Another in-joke in the comic is the inclusion of the mascot from Bad Robot – J. J. Abrams' production company – in Picard's quarters.

The third issue of Star Trek Countdown was the first comic to be released in stores and on the iPhone on the same day. The four-issue comic series Star Trek: Nero takes place shortly after the events in Countdown.

In 2013, IDW published the official Star Trek Into Darkness prequel, the 4-issue mini-series Star Trek: Countdown to Darkness, and the official sequel, the 4-issue mini-series Star Trek: Khan.

== Plot ==
The comic is set in 2387, eight years after the film Star Trek: Nemesis. Federation and Romulan tensions have generally subsided, with Spock the Federation ambassador to the Romulans. Data is still alive and has become the captain of the Enterprise-E after successfully imprinting his memories onto the prototype android B-4. Jean-Luc Picard is the Federation ambassador to Vulcan, Geordi La Forge has retired to develop his own ships, and Worf is a general in the Klingon Empire.

The galaxy is threatened by the Hobus star, which will become a supernova. Spock proposes that the Romulans transport the precious mineral decalithium to Vulcan, where it can be converted into red matter capable of turning the star into a short-lived black hole, therefore ending its threat. The Romulan Senate opposes Spock, but he finds a comrade in Nero, the leader of the miners. Nero witnessed the Hobus supernova consume a planet first-hand and offers to secretly transport decalithium, noting it would be better than doing nothing and then leaving his wife and unborn son to die. Nero's ship, the Narada, is attacked by the Remans, but the Enterprise rescues them and escorts them to Vulcan with decalithium taken from the Reman ships. The Vulcan Council opposes Romulan use of red matter, infuriating Nero; he vows if Romulus is destroyed, he shall hold them accountable.

Nero returns to Romulus to discover Hobus has gone supernova and destroyed his home world. Driven mad by his loss, he attacks Federation Olympic class hospital ships that have arrived to give aid, believing they have come to claim his people's territory. He beams surviving Romulan senators onto his ship and kills them for not listening to Spock, and then claims the Praetor's ancient trident, the Debrune Teral'n, which is the greatest symbol of Romulus. He and his crew then shave their heads and apply tattoos to signify their loss. Nero goes to the Vault, a secretive Romulan base, and has the Narada outfitted with Borg technology to begin a rampage against his perceived enemies.

With the supernova expanding, Spock decides to deploy the red matter weapon. He takes the Jellyfish, a ship developed by La Forge that can withstand extreme environmental conditions. The Narada goes about destroying Federation, Klingon, and Cardassian ships alike, wounding Worf and damaging the Enterprise in the process. When Spock successfully destroys the supernova, the Narada appears to attack when the black hole flings it and the Jellyfish back in time, leaving Picard and the crew of the Enterprise as witnesses to Spock's sacrifice.

== Reception ==
Reviews of the first issue of Countdown by IGN, Ain't It Cool News, TrekMovie.com and TrekWeb were positive. IDW editor-in-chief Chris Ryall blogged that although more than the intended volume had been printed, Countdown sold out within two weeks of its publication. IGN also positively reviewed the third and fourth issues, while io9 also published a positive review of the entire series.

== Canonicity ==
When asked whether the filmmakers' involvement in the comic made it canonical, Roberto Orci stated he was in no position to declare whether it was, though he felt it could easily remain as such unless it was contradicted in a future film. The first season of Star Trek: Picard contradicts several plot points of Countdown, making the supernova the Romulan sun rather than the Hobus star, and establishes that Data's memories were never successfully imprinted into B-4, who was disassembled after a ban on synthetics in 2385. The ban prompted Picard, an admiral rather than an ambassador, to resign from Starfleet. The third season of Picard also states that Worf, rather than Data, succeeded Picard as the captain of the Enterprise-E and later worked for Starfleet Intelligence rather than becoming a Klingon general.

== Collected editions ==
The series has been collected into trade paperback and hardcover editions:

- Star Trek: Countdown (104 pages, April 21, 2009, ISBN 1-60010-420-7)
- Star Trek: Countdown (104 pages, November 25, 2009, ISBN 1-60010-639-0)
- Star Trek: Countdown (104 pages, November 12, 2009, Amazon.co.uk Exclusive packaged with Blu-ray release Star Trek 2009)
