= Brian Lynch (American writer) =

American film and comic book writer (born 1973)

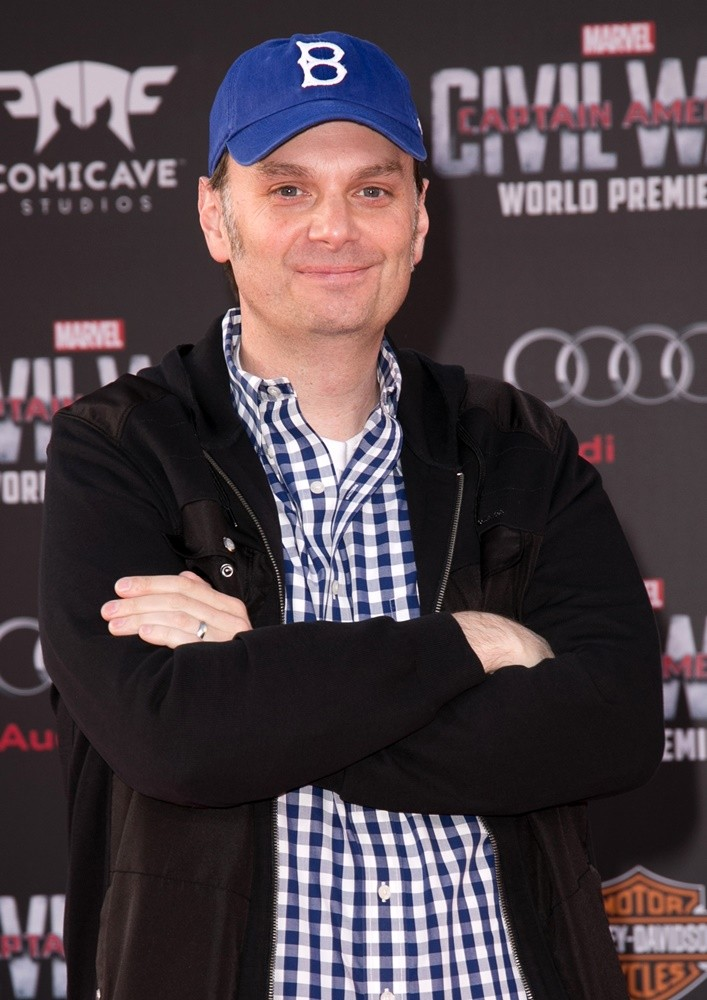
- Lynch at the premiere of Captain America: Civil War in April 2016
- Born: Brian Michael Lynch; June 21, 1973 (age 53); New Jersey, U.S.
- Occupation: Screenwriter
- Years active: 1997–present

Brian Michael Lynch (born June 21, 1973) is an American film and comic book writer. Lynch was the initial writer and co-creator of Angel: After the Fall for IDW Publishing alongside Joss Whedon, and is best known for writing the screenplays for the films Puss in Boots (2011), Minions (2015), The Secret Life of Pets (2016), The Secret Life of Pets 2 (2019), and Minions: The Rise of Gru (2022). He has also written unproduced film adaptations of both The Sims and The Muppets.

== Life and career ==
Growing up in Middletown Township, New Jersey, Lynch attended Middletown High School South and William Paterson University of New Jersey.

Lynch went to school with (and was friends with) Vincent Pereira, who worked with Kevin Smith at the Quick Stop/RST Video and who inspired Smith's own film career. Despite seeing himself as a writer rather than filmmaker, Lynch contributed in a non-writing capacity to Smith's early films and then wrote/directed one of three non-Smith-directed films under the View Askew label Big Helium Dog.

Except for four years during early childhood spent in Indiana, Lynch lived in New Jersey all his life.

In 2004, he moved to Hollywood, California.

On September 2010, Lynch made an overall deal with Illumination Entertainment to produce scripts for their animated films.

== Comics and animated series ==
Lynch has worked on a number of comics and animated series:

- Angry Naked Pat (animated series)
- Spider-Man Unlimited (vol 3) #1
- Monkey Man Unleashed
- Patchouli One Shot
- Spike: Asylum
- Spike: Shadow Puppets
- Angel: After the Fall #1–17
- Spike: After the Fall
- Spike (IDW Publishing)
- Teenage Mutant Ninja Turtles: Microseries #1-3 (IDW Publishing)
- Monster Motors: The Curse of Minivan Helsing
- Bill & Ted's Most Triumphant Return #1–6 (IDW Publishing)

== Filmography ==
- A Better Place (1997) – Actor (Eddie)
- Big Helium Dog (1999) – Director, Writer, Editor, Miscellaneous Crew. Actor (Director's Assistant)
- Jay and Silent Bob Strike Back (2001) – Actor (Comic Book Shopper #1) (uncredited)
- Hop (2011) – Writer with Cinco Paul and Ken Daurio
- Puss in Boots (2011) – Story with Will Davies and Tom Wheeler
- Despicable Me: Minion Mayhem (2012) - Writer
- Minions (2015) - Writer
- Binky Nelson Unpacified (2015) - Writer, Director
- The Secret Life of Pets (2016) - Writer with Cinco Paul and Ken Daurio
- The Secret Life of Pets 2 (2019) - Writer
- Minions: The Rise of Gru (2022) - Story with Matthew Fogel
- The Fantastic Four: First Steps (2025) - Additional Literary Material
- Minions & Monsters (2026) - Screenplay, Executive producer
