= Star Trek: Nero =

Publication information
- Publisher: IDW Publishing
- Schedule: Monthly
- Format: Limited series
- Genre: Science fiction
- Publication date: August–November 2009
- No. of issues: 4

Creative team
- Created by: Gene Roddenberry
- Written by: Script: Roberto Orci; Alex Kurtzman
- Artist(s): David Messina

Collected editions
- Star Trek: Nero: ISBN 1-60010-603-X

Star Trek: Nero is a four-issue comic book prequel to the 2009 film Star Trek and sequel of the previous book Star Trek: Countdown, both by IDW Publishing. It follows the character of the Romulan Nero and his crew in the time between the destruction of the USS Kelvin and the kidnapping of Spock.
