= David Messina =

Italian comics artist

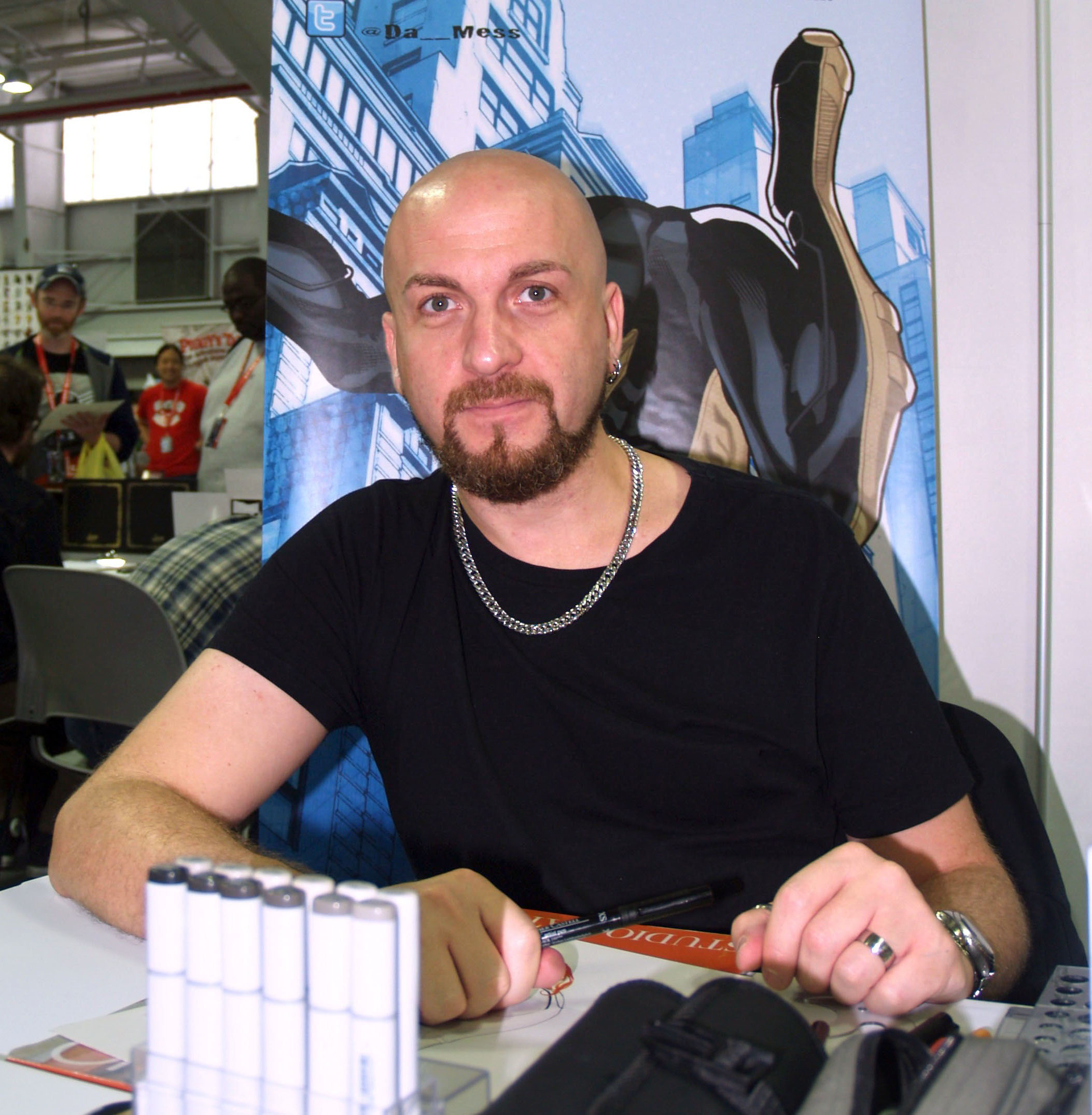
- Messina at Special Edition NYC
- Born: David Messina; 1974 (age 51–52) Rome Italy
- Areas: Writer, Artist, Publisher
- Notable works: Star Trek: Countdown; Star Trek: Nero; Doyle: Spotlight

David Messina (born 1974) is an Italian comics artist.

== Early life ==
David Messina was born in 1974 in Rome. He graduated from the Scuola Internazionale di Comics in Rome.

== Career ==
David Messina did storyboarding and character design in the animation industry and also worked in graphic design before moving into comics.

He has published erotic comic books for the Spanish, Italian and French markets. He moved into the American comics industry in 2005. He has worked for IDW Publishing, Marvel Comics, Image Comics, Devil's Due Publishing and DC Comics.

Since 2002, Messina has taught at his alma mater, the Scuola Internazionale di Comics.

== Bibliography ==
- Doyle: Spotlight
- "Unacceptable Losses"
- The Curse
- Old Friends (Angel comic)
- Star Trek: Countdown
- Star Trek: Nero
- Star Wars: Han Solo & Chewbacca (2022), Marvel Comics
- 3Keys (2023), Image Comics

=== Erotic comics ===
- Sally Potter
- The Big Pervert
- The "X" Factor
