= Franco Urru =

Italian comic artist

Franco Urru (born in Rome, July 27, 1960; died in Rome, November 29, 2012) was an Italian comic artist best known in the United States for his work on Spike: Asylum, Spike: Shadow Puppets and Angel: After The Fall for IDW Publishing.

He was the main artist for the first five issues of Angel: After The Fall, a canonical continuation of the Angel television series.

He died on November 29, 2012.
