= Buffy the Vampire Slayer: The Score =

Soundtrack album by Christophe Beck
- Released: September 9, 2008
- Recorded: 1998–2001
- Genre: Television soundtrack
- Length: 57:44
- Label: Rounder Records
- Producers: Joss Whedon; Christophe Beck

Buffy the Vampire Slayer: The Score is a soundtrack album featuring incidental music from the Buffy the Vampire Slayer TV series.

It is the first Buffy CD release which is exclusively dedicated to the TV series' musical score, and features compositions from seasons 2, 3, 4, 5 and season 6 from the episode "Bargaining". The album was released on September 9, 2008.

== Critical reception ==
IGN gave a rating of nine out of ten and said the album "[...] does a great job of capturing the full scope of the series". David Bowling writing for Blogcritics noted "Angel Waits", "Remembering Jenny", "Slayer's Elegy", and "Faith's End" as the highlights of the album.

== Track listing ==
1. Massacre (from "Becoming")
2. Angel Waits (from "Passion")
3. Remembering Jenny (from "Passion")
4. Twice the Fool (from "Bewitched, Bothered and Bewildered")
5. Moment of Happiness (from "Innocence")
6. Loneliness of Six (from "Lover's Walk")
7. Sugar High (from "Band Candy")
8. Tai Chi (from "Band Candy")
9. Kralik's House (from "Helpless")
10. Magic Snow Music (from "Amends")
11. Slayer's Elegy (from "The Wish")
12. Faith's End (from "Graduation Day")
13. Drink Me (from "Graduation Day")
14. One Last Moment (from "Graduation Day")
15. Haunted (from "Fear Itself")
16. From the Grave (from "This Year's Girl")
17. Demon Got Your Tongue (from "Hush")
18. Golf Claps (from "Hush")
19. The Princess Screams (from "Hush")
20. Spellbound (from "Who Are You?")
21. Fyarl in the Morning (from "A New Man")
22. A Really Big Sandbox (from "Restless")
23. Spaghetti (from "Restless")
24. Body Paint (from "Restless")
25. Xander's Nightmare (from "Restless")
26. The Tower (from "The Gift")
27. Losing Battle (from "The Gift")
28. Apocalypse (from "The Gift")
29. Sacrifice (alternate version, from "The Gift" / "Bargaining")

Note: The first version of Sacrifice appeared on the episode “The Gift”; that version of the song was released on the “Buffy the Vampire Slayer: Once More, With Feeling” soundtrack. On this disc there is an “alternate version” of the same song; it seems that this particular version has been used in the “Bargaining” episode. There is some confusion in labeling this track as a consequence.

iTunes Exclusive Bonus Tracks

30. Willow and Oz (from "Something Blue")
31. Thanksgiving Brawl (from "Pangs")

Rhapsody Exclusive Bonus Track

30. 2 Girls, 1 Van (from "Restless")

Amazon Exclusive Bonus Track

30. Exposition Song (from "Restless")
