= The Yoko Factor =

- Buffy the Vampire Slayer episode
- Episode no.: Season 4 Episode 20
- Directed by: David Grossman
- Written by: Doug Petrie
- Production code: 4ABB20
- Original air date: May 9, 2000

Guest appearances
- Amber Benson as Tara Maclay; Leonard Roberts as Forrest Gates; Conor O'Farrell as Colonel McNamara; George Hertzberg as Adam; Emma Caulfield as Anya; David Boreanaz as Angel; Bob Fimiani as Mr. Ward; Jade Carter as Lieutenant

Episode chronology
← Previous "New Moon Rising"	Next → "Primeval"
- Buffy the Vampire Slayer season 4

"The Yoko Factor" is the 20th episode of season 4 of the television show Buffy the Vampire Slayer. The episode aired on May 9, 2000 on The WB.

Spike, now allied with the hybrid demon/cyborg monster Adam, gleefully separates the Scoobies from each other: Buffy and Riley have some tension when Angel briefly visits Sunnydale; Xander feels unwanted since he is not in college; Willow thinks the others are hostile toward her romantic relationship with Tara; Giles feels unneeded by the others.

== Plot ==
Colonel McNamara discusses with a superior how to get Riley back in the Initiative and how to deal with Buffy. Spike tells Adam that Buffy should not be underestimated. Spike has killed two Slayers (Xin Rong and Nikki Wood), yet is unable to harm Buffy because of the Initiative chip in his head. The two plan to separate Buffy from her Slayerette friends.

Still upset about what happened between her and Angel during her visit to Los Angeles, Buffy returns from L.A. to her empty dorm room. Xander brings Riley some clothes, and they talk about their mutual distaste for Angel, Riley having been told by Buffy about her previous relationship with him. However, it emerges that she has not told him the whole truth; while Riley was aware that Angel lost his soul and became Angelus, Xander tells Riley that having sex with Buffy was the trigger that set Angelus free.

Spike visits Giles at home and offers him files from inside the Initiative. He says that Buffy does not respect her former Watcher anymore, which upsets Giles and causes him to turn to drink. Willow and Tara play with their new kitten, Miss Kitty Fantastico, while planning their class schedule for next year. They also talk about future housing plans, as Willow feels that her friendship with Buffy has become shaky.

Spike convinces Xander that the rest of the gang think he's useless and should join the Army. Riley visits Buffy; using a radio, he is listening to the Initiative's plans. She leaves to seek Adam. In the woods, Buffy encounters Forrest; they argue as they enter a cave and find Adam, who launches a surprise attack. Buffy and Adam fight; Forrest shoots Adam with his stun rifle. However, the voltage energizes Adam, who fatally stabs Forrest with his arm bone skewer. Buffy flees, but trips and strikes her head on a rock, knocking her unconscious.

Meanwhile, having supposedly sneaked into the Initiative to steal information, Spike charges into Giles's place with the disks. Giles is drunk, so Willow tries to decrypt the disks. Spike talks to Willow and Tara about their Wicca interest and how her friends think it is just a passing phase, but Willow takes this to mean their lesbian relationship.

Riley hears of rampaging demon trouble on the streets through his radio. In an alley he finds Angel fighting the commandos, and Riley refuses to let Angel go see Buffy. The two fight, and Angel is clearly the victor. Both run off when a military truck arrives.

Buffy returns to her dorm room and Angel shows up. As Angel speaks with Buffy, Riley barges in and raises a gun to Angel. Angel taunts Riley and the two come to blows again. Buffy separates them and wants to talk to Angel alone. They mutually apologize and part on friendly terms. Riley is worried that Buffy has reunited with Angel, whom he thinks is evil again, or at least "all Mister Billowy Coat King of Pain." They profess their love to each other, but Buffy must give him the bad news that Forrest is dead. Riley is distraught and leaves.

Spike reports back to Adam, happy to have split up the Scooby Gang, and the damage becomes clear when their meeting at Giles's home turns into a fight. While Tara and Anya hide in the bathroom, Buffy scolds Xander for telling Riley details about her and Angel's relationship and argues that she is going to take on Adam alone. Xander complains that his friends do not need him and Willow complains that Buffy does not accept Tara, revealing their relationship, for the first time, to Xander and Giles. While Giles goes to sleep the alcohol off, Buffy leaves, telling her friends that she cannot use them in battle, but does have someone else she can depend on – little realizing that Riley has gone to Adam's lair.

== Critical reception ==
Vox, ranking it at #96 of all 144 episodes on their "Worst to Best" list, writes, "Every so often, Buffy would be like, 'Hey, audience, do you remember that Spike is a villainous, treacherous killer?' and the audience would be like, 'LOL, no!' Then the show would try to remind viewers that Spike was not to be trusted. That's the conceit of this episode, in which season four's Big Bad, Adam, tries to get Spike to turn the Scooby Gang against each other. It doesn’t really work, and the episode flails trying to make it work. At this point, though, Buffy could do these 'time to fight the main villain' episodes in its sleep, and 'Yoko' uses that momentum to its advantage."

Paste Magazine, in a similar list, ranked it at #86 and wrote, "Damned almost as often as it is praised, for me 'The Yoko Factor' lies somewhere in between. It's a clever title, and Spike and Adam's divide-and-conquer strategy is basic, but ingenious... Buffy breaking up the fight between Riley and Angel was funny... This is also the first appearance of Miss Kitty Fantastico..." Rolling Stone ranked the episode #102, calling the episode "mundane", but praising the argument had between the characters.

A commenter for Critically Touched Reviews praised "the successful payoff we've been waiting for all season," an "extremely well acted" and "potent" argument scene at the end, and "great characterization;" he described some scenes as "very funny and well-written" and "simply wonderful."

Noel Murray of The A.V. Club, whose "Community Grade" gave the episode an A−, wrote, "The first fifteen minutes of The Yoko Factor is like the Inglourious Basterds of Buffy episodes, offering six long, winding, evenly paced conversations, punctuated by a quiet interlude and a kitschy-but-oddly-moving musical number... [T]he episode is always at its strongest when people are just talking to each other, either because they're enjoying each other's company or trying to figure out each other out [sic]. It's nice, for example, that... writer Doug Petrie found time to show Willow and Tara talking about their plans for sophomore year, while playing with the cutest kitten ever born." While he thought "this crossover seemed a little forced," he also "felt like all the extended chatter in The Yoko Factor rang essentially true."

Two reviewers for the BBC Buffy review pages said, "This [is] what we've been waiting for. No, not the culmination of the Initiative plot. Riley vs Angel: mano a vampo. The five star celebrity un-death match... It's all great fun" and "A very cunning and different episode from Doug Petrie. Yes, Adam may still be a bit pants as a villain, but it's great seeing him and Spike plan to destroy Buffy by making her friends fight. Suddenly, all the little quirks of this season - Xander's jobs, Giles's drinking, Tara and Willow - all come together in a big, messy splat of a squabble. Magnificent stuff. It's also really great seeing Angel back in Buffy - even if it is just to see him pummelling and smirking at Riley."
