= Beer Bad =

- Buffy the Vampire Slayer episode
- Episode no.: Season 4 Episode 5
- Directed by: David Solomon
- Written by: Tracey Forbes
- Production code: 4ABB05
- Original air date: November 2, 1999

Guest appearances
- Marc Blucas as Riley Finn; Adam Kaufman as Parker Abrams; Paige Moss as Veruca; Eric Matheny as Colm; Stephen M. Porter as Jack the Bartender; Lindsay Crouse as Maggie Walsh; Kal Penn as Hunt; Jake Phillips as Kip; Bryan Cuprill as Roy; Lisa Johnson as Paula; Joshua Wheeler as Driver; Patrick Belton as College Kid #1; Kaycee Shank as College Kid #2; Steven Jang as College Kid #3; Cameron Bender as Stoner; Kate Luhr as Young Woman

Episode chronology
← Previous "Fear, Itself"	Next → "Wild at Heart"
- Buffy the Vampire Slayer season 4

"Beer Bad" is the fifth episode of the fourth season of the television series Buffy the Vampire Slayer. The episode aired on The WB on November 2, 1999. It is written by Tracey Forbes and directed by David Solomon. It was nominated for an Emmy Award for Outstanding Hairstyling in a Series.

The episode, generally unpopular, shows Buffy and some classmates getting drunk on beer brewed by a warlock, with ensuing hijinks. Willow worries about Oz's attraction to Veruca, a singer in a band playing at the Bronze.

== Plot synopsis ==
Buffy is still hurting because classmate Parker dumped her after a night together. In a daydream during one of Professor Walsh's classes (pointedly, about the role of the id in Freudian psychology) she saves Parker's life and he swears to do anything to get her back. A dialogue with Willow later shows how much Buffy is not over him yet.

In the real world, Xander gets a job as a bartender with a fake ID, and has to endure the behavior of college students so puffed up with their feeling of entitlement as to drip elitist insults upon Xander. He gets to test his empathy skills with none other than Buffy, who proceeds to get drunk on "Black Frost" beer with four college boys.

Oz and Willow are in The Bronze together, but he feels a strange connection to the pretty singer Veruca when she gets on the stage with her band Shy. The next morning, Willow has to cope not only with jealousy over Veruca (whom she calls a "groupie"), but also with Buffy, who seems to be suffering from "Black Frost."

That evening when Buffy drinks herself drunk, it is soon revealed why: somebody has set up a chemical lab and is putting more into the beer than just malt. Xander finally sends Buffy home. When her four drinking buddies turn into violent Neanderthals, he learns that the owner of the pub has been adding a mystical potion, which a warlock taught him, to make ensorcelled beer as revenge for 20 years' worth of college kids taunting him. Despite the pub owner explaining that the effects wear off after a day or so, Xander heads off, knowing the damage that could be done in that time. While the boys escape to the streets of Sunnydale, Xander gets Giles to help. They find Buffy drawing cave paintings on her dorm wall and saying "Parker bad." Giles and Xander are unable to keep Buffy in her room when she gets a craving for more beer.

Meanwhile, Willow confronts Parker with what he has done to Buffy. When he turns his charm on her she plays along, then asks just how gullible he thinks she is, before launching into a rant about how primitive men are. Just then, the Neanderthal students burst into the room. They knock Willow and Parker unconscious and start a fire that rapidly burns out of control. Xander catches up with Buffy and when they see smoke from the Neanderthals' fire, they rush to help. Though afraid of the flames and unable to figure out how to use an extinguisher, Buffy saves Willow, Parker, two students captured by the Neanderthals, and her erstwhile drinking buddies. In the end, Parker thanks Buffy for saving his life and apologizes, just the way she had dreamt — only to be coldcocked by a club-wielding Buffy. The Neanderthal students are subsequently locked into a van by Xander, to be confined until back to normal.

== Writing and acting ==
"Beer Bad" is written with a classic frame structure — Buffy's dream — that emphasizes her development; hitting Parker with a stick qualifies as poetic justice. Producer Doug Petrie says, despite the intensely negative reaction of the fans to seeing Buffy being "battered about by the forces of college" and being treated so callously by Parker, they had to "ride that out" until this episode because "we didn't want her to find her strength immediately in this new setting".

However, the most striking feature of "Beer Bad" is the twinning of morality and the moral of the story: Beer and casual sex are bad. In a BBC interview, Petrie states: "Well, very young people get unlimited access to alcohol and become horrible! We all do it — or most of us do it — and live to regret it, and we wanted to explore that." This plot was written with the plan to take advantage of funds from the Office of National Drug Control Policy available to shows that promoted an anti-drug message. Funding was rejected for the episode because "[d]rugs were an issue, but ... [it] was otherworldly nonsense, very abstract and not like real-life kids taking drugs. Viewers wouldn't make the link to [the ONDCP's] message."

In an interview, David Solomon revealed doubts he and Whedon had about the quality of the episode: "The fourth season's Beer Bad wasn't everyone's cup of tea, especially with Buffy fans. Solomon had some doubts about this episode but it turned out to be better than he expected. "Joss wasn't entirely pleased with this story," he says. "He came into my office at the last minute with the script and said to me, 'I tried to make it better but all I did was make it funnier.' I took that to mean, 'We're not exactly sure what this is supposed to be about so just enjoy yourself.' So I actually had a ball doing it. It was a laugh to watch frat boys turn into cavemen and have Buffy affected by the same thing that was affecting them. We just let everyone go 'crazy' and nothing all bad came out of it."

While "Beer Bad" is often called one of the worst episodes by fans and critics, Whedon has a different perspective on the episode: "It's interesting, every single episode contains an attempt to do something real, and contains at least one or two lines that crack me up, or one or two moments that genuinely shock me. I know there are ones that are not favorites among fans. And there are definitely ones where I scratch my head and go, "You know, this seemed a great idea on paper." But I never actually singled one out and went, "Here's a total failure." .... "Everyone always talks about the Frankenstein one, but I think it has some beautiful stuff in it. And I think the same thing about "Beer Bad," where Buffy goes all cave man. A lot of people groan at that one, but I think it has some lovely stuff in it."

== Reception ==
Vox, ranking it at #144 of all 144 episodes (i.e., the worst), writes, "It speaks volumes about the quality of Buffy the Vampire Slayer that the episode almost universally agreed to be the worst of the series still manages to boast some sharp dialogue, physical and verbal humor, and even a dang Emmy nomination (for Makeup and Hairstyling). Still, let us not gloss over the bad, which, as this show goes, is very bad: We get yet another episode of Buffy moping over terrible Parker, the introduction of the odious she-werewolf Veruca, and a very silly, very preachy story about the awfulness of college students drinking beer (oh, the horror)."

Billie Doux, giving a rating of 1 out of 4 stakes, writes, "It's tempting to say episode bad! So it wasn't what I'd call great, but it was fun — especially in a bashing-the-poophead sense. Plus we have the blatant comparison of male college students with prehistoric morons who really want nothing but booze and sex." She calls it "a great scene" when Willow seems to succumb to Parker's smarmy charms, but instead challenges him: "Just how gullible do you think I am?"

A BBC reviewer complained about its "American puritanism" and Slayage criticized writer Tracey Forbes for delivering a trite and obvious message in a series containing "such an abundant feminist subtext". However, Todd Hertz of Christianity Today used this episode of an example of the show's honest portrayal of consequences. The episode remains the lowest rated of the series on film and television aggregation site IMDb.

== Notes ==
1. Willow scolds, "I got your number, id boy. ... I mean, you men. It's all about the sex! You find a woman, drag her to your den, do whatever's necessary just as long as you get the sex. I tell you, men haven't changed since the dawn of time."
