= The Initiative (Buffy the Vampire Slayer) =

- Buffy the Vampire Slayer episode
- Episode no.: Season 4 Episode 7
- Directed by: James A. Contner
- Written by: Doug Petrie
- Production code: 4ABB07
- Original air date: November 16, 1999

Guest appearances
- Marc Blucas as Riley Finn; Mercedes McNab as Harmony Kendall; Adam Kaufman as Parker Abrams; Bailey Chase as Graham Miller; Leonard Roberts as Forrest Gates; Lindsay Crouse as Maggie Walsh; Mace Lombard as Tom; Scott Becker as Lost Freshman

Episode chronology
| ← Previous "Wild at Heart" | Next → "Pangs" |
- Buffy the Vampire Slayer season 4

"The Initiative" is the seventh episode of season 4 of the television show Buffy the Vampire Slayer. Written by Doug Petrie and directed by James A. Contner, it originally aired on November 16, 1999 on the WB network.

In "The Initiative", Spike is imprisoned in an underground demon-research facility, and Riley Finn realizes he has a crush on Buffy.

== Plot ==
Riley, and his friends Forrest and Graham, watch Buffy making a mess of the soda and yogurt machines. They comment on what a catch she is, and how interested they all are in her, although Riley is reluctant to make fun. Giles and Xander discover the commandoes are human and that their help will not be needed in researching. Buffy decides to go to a party with Willow to hopefully cheer her up, and Giles and Xander go on patrol for her.

Spike, having been knocked out by a Taser in the previous episode, awakes in a facility where various types of demons are held captive behind electrically charged barriers. A packet of blood drops from the ceiling into Spike's cell, but before he drinks it, a vampire in the next cell - Tom, captured in "The Freshman" - warns him that doctors starve the vampires and then feed them drugged blood before doing experiments on them.

In class, Willow asks about Oz, and Riley and Professor Walsh tell her that he dropped out of class and will not likely come back, saddening her. Buffy tells the professor off for her harsh behavior, prompting Walsh to comment to Riley that she likes her. Forrest asks Parker about Buffy, and when Parker vulgarly brags about having sex with her, Riley punches him, realizing that he likes Buffy. He visits Willow and asks her advice in wooing Buffy; Willow, still emotionally distressed, questions his motives, but eventually relents, listing some of Buffy's likes and interests.

Spike lies on the floor of his cell, pretending to have drunk the drugged blood, and when the doctors come to get him he attacks. He escapes the Initiative and returns to Harmony's lair to visit her, then immediately leaves to kill the Slayer. Xander later discovers Harmony crying, burning some of Spike's things. After a brief inept slap-fight, Harmony tells Xander that Spike is back.

At the party, Willow tries to help Riley flirt with Buffy, but his attempts are thwarted when Xander arrives to inform Buffy that Spike has returned. Riley is also called away; he and Forrest break away from the party and, after passing through several electronic checkpoints, go down a hidden elevator to the underground facility where Spike had been held. The operation's head, Walsh, informs them that Spike has escaped, and Riley gives orders to three teams that he sends out all over Sunnydale to find Spike. Riley's team then spots Buffy sitting on a bench, and Riley refuses to allow them to use her as bait. Each unaware of the other's secret identity, Riley and Buffy try to send each other out of harm's way.

Meanwhile, Spike has found Buffy's dorm through the school computer system. Willow, moping in her room, hears a knock on the door and invites the person in without thinking. Spike swaggers through the door and attempts to bite Willow, but is stopped by an intense pain in his head. After a short, calm dialogue with multiple metaphorical references to impotence, Willow hits him with a lamp and runs out just as Riley and friends cut the power and then work their way up to the dorm room. They capture Spike but, while they are considering whether to take Willow or not, Spike breaks free. Buffy arrives and fights Riley and his friends while Spike manages to escape through a window. Unable to make out the identity of their attacker, Riley orders them to retreat.

Walsh is not happy, either with what happened or with Riley's report on the event. It is revealed that Spike cannot harm a human without feeling pain in his head because of an implant they had placed there. Riley catches up with Buffy and they talk. Buffy tells him he is a little peculiar, a term used by Riley before he realized he liked Buffy, and he responds that he can "live with that".

== Reception ==
Vox, ranking it at #116 of all 144 episodes, writes, "As plot-heavy season four episodes go, 'The Initiative' isn't too shabby. It has a kind of slapstick charm to it: There’s the newly escaped and bechipped Spike trying to bite Willow, only to suffer from some performance issues; there’s Xander and Harmony’s slow-motion slap fight."

Billie Doux, giving a rating of 4 out of 4 stakes, writes, "Episodes like this one are the reason I've become such a big fan of this show. We found out a lot more about the Commando Vampire Testing Lab and who is involved... and even though they're doing a lot of what Buffy does, i.e., saving the world from demons and monsters, there's something really off about the 'latest in fall fascism.'"

== Notes ==
1. In class, after Walsh is severe to Willow, Buffy says coldly, "You know, for someone who teaches human behavior, you might try showing some." When she leaves, Walsh tells Riley, "I like her." Riley remarks, "Really? You don't think she's a little peculiar?" The word "peculiar" is used six times in the script, becoming a running joke, with Buffy saying to Riley, in the closing moments, "You're a little peculiar." He replies, "I can live with that."
