= Hush (Buffy the Vampire Slayer) =

- Buffy the Vampire Slayer episode
- Episode no.: Season 4 Episode 10
- Directed by: Joss Whedon
- Written by: Joss Whedon
- Cinematography by: Michael Gershman
- Production code: 4ABB10
- Original air date: December 14, 1999
- Running time: 44 minutes

Guest appearances
- Marc Blucas as Riley Finn; Emma Caulfield as Anya; Leonard Roberts as Forrest Gates; Phina Oruche as Olivia; Amber Benson as Tara Maclay; Brooke Bloom as Nicole; Jessica Townsend as Cheryl; Lindsay Crouse as Maggie Walsh; Doug Jones as Gentleman; Camden Toy as Gentleman; Don W. Lewis as Gentleman; Charlie Brumbly as Gentleman; Carlos Amezcua as Newscaster; Elizabeth Thuax as Little Girl; Wayne Sable as Freshman

Episode chronology
← Previous "Something Blue"	Next → "Doomed"
- Buffy the Vampire Slayer season 4

"Hush" is the tenth episode in the fourth season of the supernatural drama television series Buffy the Vampire Slayer (1997–2003). It was written and directed by series creator Joss Whedon and originally aired in the United States on December 14, 1999, on The WB. After reading critical response to the series in which the dialogue was praised as the most successful aspect of the show, Whedon set out to write an episode almost completely devoid of speech. Only about 17 minutes of dialogue is presented in the entire 44 minutes of "Hush".

In "Hush", a group of fairytale ghouls named "The Gentlemen" come to town and steal everyone's voices, leaving them unable to scream when The Gentlemen cut out their hearts. Buffy and her friends must communicate with one another silently as they try to discover why no one can speak and find whoever is murdering the townspeople. They must also find ways to express their feelings about each other and keep some semblance of control as the town descends into chaos.

The episode was highly praised when it aired and was the only episode in the entire series to be nominated for an Emmy Award in Outstanding Writing for a Drama Series; it also received a nomination for Outstanding Cinematography for a Single Camera Series (Michael Gershman). "Hush" addresses the limits and assets of language and communication and the disruption to society when communication breaks down. The Gentlemen are often counted as some of the series' most frightening villains, and the episode is frequently included on lists of the best of Buffy the Vampire Slayer.

== Plot ==
During a college lecture where Professor Walsh is discussing the difference between language and communication, Buffy has a dream in which Riley kisses her. They are interrupted by a young girl holding a distinctive box, singing a cryptic rhyme about "the Gentlemen". Riley and Buffy speak after class and they almost kiss, but are unable to stop talking. They leave when it becomes awkward. Buffy calls Giles to tell him of her dream and the details of the little girl's rhyme. In the middle of Xander and Anya's argument with each other over the meaning of their relationship, Giles asks Xander to allow Spike to stay over at his house, as Giles' girlfriend Olivia will be visiting him from London for a few days.

Meanwhile, Willow attends a meeting of the campus Wicca group, hoping to meet others who share her interest in studying witchcraft, but is disappointed when they only talk about bake sales. Willow raises the subject of spells but is chastised for pandering to the stereotype about witches performing magic. A shy woman in the group, Tara Maclay, starts to speak up to support Willow's suggestion, but falls silent when the attention turns to her.

That night, as Sunnydale sleeps, white wisps float from each person's mouth to a belfry, where they settle in the box from Buffy's dream, as ghoulish skeletal figures with metal-toothed grins and impeccable black suits look on. In the morning, Buffy and Willow discover they are unable to speak and become visibly distressed; they soon discover that everybody is unable to speak. The group gathers at Giles' house, where they see that the news is reporting that Sunnydale is suffering from an epidemic of laryngitis. Buffy and Riley, each concerned that chaos will ensue, find each other attempting to keep order on the streets. Buffy does not know about Riley's paramilitary role as an agent of the government-controlled, demon-capturing Initiative; he in turn is unaware that she is the Slayer. They exchange a look and then their first kiss, before parting to continue their efforts.

The next night, the ghouls leave the belfry and float into town accompanied by their straitjacketed, deformed minions. They knock on the door of a student. When he opens it, roused from sleeping, they hold him down and carve out his heart while he tries in vain to scream. At Giles' apartment, Olivia is frightened by one of the Gentlemen outside Giles' window. The following morning in a campus classroom, Giles uses a series of overhead transparencies to explain to the others that the Gentlemen steal the townspeople's voices so no one can scream as they gather the hearts they need, and that folklore indicates that they have been vanquished before when a princess screamed: the only thing that will kill them is a live human voice.

On her own, Tara finds a spell to help the town get their voices back, and goes out to show it to Willow. On the way to Willow's dorm she trips, turns around and sees the Gentlemen floating toward her. In Willow's dorm she frantically knocks on doors which no one will open; the Gentlemen steadily pursue her. Willow hears Tara's panicked knocking down the hall and exits her room as Tara sprints into her, sending them both tumbling. They lock themselves into a laundry room and try to barricade the door with a vending machine, but it is too heavy for them to move. Willow, injured, sits and concentrates on moving the machine with telekinesis; she fails, but Tara sees what she is doing. They clasp hands and the machine moves swiftly across the room, blocking the door.

On patrol, Riley notices shadows in the belfry and goes to investigate. Buffy finds two of the Gentlemen's minions, kills one and runs after the other. Riley fights his way into the belfry and while he is embattled, Buffy crashes through a window to fight the Gentlemen. He turns to attack and finds himself face to face with Buffy; she sees him as an armed agent of the Initiative for the first time. When a minion aggressively holds her from behind, she sees and recognizes the box from her dream and gesticulates wildly for Riley to destroy it. When he does so, the stolen voices escape. With her voice returned, Buffy screams until the heads of the Gentlemen and their minions explode.

The next day, Tara tells Willow she is special and has significant power. Olivia tells Giles that she now believes that everything he told her about witchcraft and darkness is true and that she is scared by the experience. Riley comes to Buffy's dorm room; they agree they "have to talk," but then sit in silence.

== Production and writing ==
When people stop talking, they start communicating. Language can interfere with communication because language limits. As soon as you say something, you've eliminated every other possibility of what you might be talking about. We also use language to separate ourselves from other people.

— Joss Whedon, DVD audio commentary for "Hush"

Joss Whedon's impetus to create "Hush" was his reaction to hearing that the primary reason behind Buffy's success was the dialogue. He felt that he was stagnating as a director, turning into a "hack" by making formulaic episodes. Whedon tended to concentrate so much on the visual aspects of the series' production that he was chastised by Fox executives in earlier seasons. Thus, writing and producing "Hush" depended almost solely on visuals and not on dialogue, a prospect that Whedon found terrifying, worried that viewers would find the episode boring. Much like the fourth-season finale "Restless"—which consisted almost entirely of dream sequences—and the sixth season musical "Once More, with Feeling", Whedon was certain he would fail at attempting to present the show in such a novel way. Initially, this was to be the episode where Riley and Buffy have sex, and Whedon took comfort in that plan because he knew people would not mind the silence, but ultimately he decided it was too early for the characters to sleep together, and he scrapped the idea.

The Gentlemen, called the "creepiest villains we've ever done" by series writer Doug Petrie, were inspired by a nightmare Whedon had as a child, specifically one in which he was in bed and approached by a floating monster. Whedon fashioned The Gentlemen as something from a Brothers Grimm fairy tale, intending them to be frightening to children — monsters who carve out people's hearts, smiling as they do so. Nosferatu, Pinhead from Hellraiser, and Mr. Burns from The Simpsons all served as physical models for The Gentlemen. Designing them with elegantly Victorian costume and demeanor, Whedon found their politeness and grace especially unsettling. Their metallic teeth were inspired by the intersection of Victorian culture with the height of the Industrial age, an era that Whedon considers "classically creepy". For Buffy studies scholar Rhonda Wilcox, The Gentlemen and their straitjacket-wearing minions, who clumsily flap, gyrate, and crouch as they move, are representative of class disparity and patriarchy: The Gentlemen, with their Victorian suits, move effortlessly to accomplish what they set out to do while their minions, whom Whedon called "footmen", do the "dirty work".

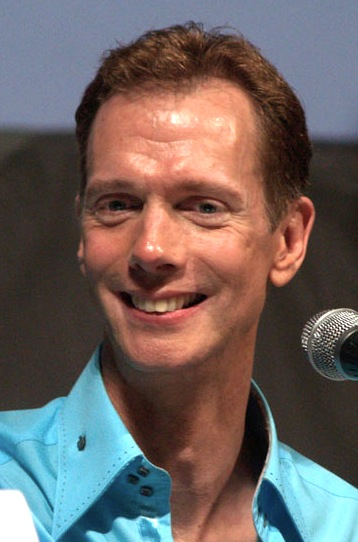
The Gentlemen in full costume were frightening to cast and crew in daylight; Doug Jones, right, who played the tallest of them, out of make-up

Doug Jones, Camden Toy, Don W. Lewis, and Charlie Brumbly—the actors who played The Gentlemen—had previous experience performing as monsters and were professional mimes as well. This gave them an elegant grace, especially in their hand movements. Their floating effect was accomplished by suspending them from cranes with wires (digitally removed in post-production), or by pulling them on dollies. The cast found the actors in make-up and costume to be terrifying in broad daylight, and Whedon was so impressed with the physical movements of The Gentlemen that he admitted on the DVD commentary that his mocking of mimes in general "went down about 40%" after the episode was filmed.

As newcomers to the Scooby Gang, Tara Maclay and Giles' girlfriend Olivia (Phina Oruche) are inexperienced with monsters, and were brought in to express "real childlike terror". Willow had, after three seasons, grown considerably more confident, having found her intellectual and emotional niche at college, and therefore was no longer evincing the terror she once had; Tara, shy, unsure of herself, and unaccustomed to such experiences, served to fill the gap that Willow's maturing had created. According to Buffy essayist Patrick Shade, Tara's and Olivia's fear "heighten(s) our sense of vulnerability and so make these scenes more frightening". Joss Whedon has said that one of his favorite shots in the episode is of Olivia's frightened reaction to a Gentlemen floating by her window, leering in at her.

Tara became a regularly recurring character throughout the fourth, fifth and sixth seasons, eventually becoming Willow's girlfriend in what would be the first long-term lesbian relationship in U.S. television. The writers decided to replace Seth Green, who played Oz, Willow's lycanthropic boyfriend, after he announced that he would be leaving early in the fourth season. They were unaware at the time that the relationship between Willow and Tara would become romantic, but Benson's performance and demeanor "made up our minds for us", according to Whedon. The writers wanted to make the scene in which Tara and Willow move the vending machine by working together "sensual and powerful", and "a very empowering statement about love; that two people together can accomplish more than when they're alone". Whedon considers the scene one of the "most romantic images we've put on film" in the course of the series. Benson and Hannigan's chemistry was impressive enough that two episodes into Tara and Willow's friendship Whedon took the actors aside and informed them the relationship would be turning romantic.

The episode is a tribute to the silent films that were played in theaters with musical accompaniment, and 27 minutes of it are entirely dialogue-free. Several types of music are used to express what is not being said; music acts as the narrator. During Giles' overhead presentation he plays a recorded version of Camille Saint-Saëns' Danse Macabre. Buffy and Riley's love theme is presented for the first time when they kiss in this episode. This composition by Christophe Beck—who composed scores for Buffy regularly—pleased Joss Whedon more than the Buffy and Angel love theme. He considered the Buffy-Riley theme more adult, but a bit more strange and blue than the Buffy-Angel theme: a prediction of where the relationship between Buffy and Riley would go.

== Themes ==
=== Language ===
"Hush" explores issues relating to the limits and benefits of language and communication. During the first act of the episode, the characters are presented as being overwhelmed by language that is misused, used as white noise, and employed as a means of avoiding truth. Many of the conversations between characters, even those that are seemingly insignificant to the episode's plot or to the show's overall history, deal in some way with various aspects or forms of communication. Whedon stated that he was unaware of how "inevitably coherent" this theme was until after the script was completed. Buffy and Riley are unable to act upon their attraction because they cannot stop babbling, primarily to keep their true identities concealed from each other, but also to avoid becoming closer emotionally. Xander is unable or unwilling to express what Anya means to him, and Anya, still new at interacting with humans, uses blunt, often rude language that distances herself from all the other characters. Giles desperately wants the others to stop talking. Willow considers the women in the Wicca group to be nonsensical, later complaining to Buffy "Talk, all talk. Blah blah Gaia. Blah blah moon, menstrual lifeforce power thingy. You know after a couple sessions I was hoping we would get into something real, but..." These pseudo conversations are what Buffy essayists Alice Jenkins and Susan Stuart refer to as "locutionary acts": language that is formed to have meaning but does not engage the listener.

When finally faced with the loss of speech, the characters readily express what they feel. Buffy and Riley, after a series of eyebrow movements and simply mouthed questions, are able to kiss spontaneously. Xander's actions are very clearly directed toward protecting Anya and punishing Spike for harming her, and likewise, within a matter of moments Anya's doubts about how Xander feels about her have disappeared and she becomes instantly affectionate towards him again. Tara, who was overcome with shyness while speaking during the Wicca meeting, easily expresses courage when touching Willow, and Willow realizes she has finally found someone who understands and shares what she is seeking.

Without speech, the Scoobies resort to gestures or writing. Humorous misperceptions arise from this gesturing when, for example, Buffy mimes driving in a stake—as though killing a vampire—too close to her pelvis, causing the Scoobies to think she is suggesting masturbating to rid the town of The Gentlemen. In the belfry, while Buffy and Riley are fighting The Gentlemen, Buffy indicates that Riley should smash the box from her dream. He misunderstands and breaks a jar beside it, looks up and grins, awaiting Buffy's approval. The clumsiness of the characters' gesturing is in direct contrast to the grace of The Gentlemen, who communicate easily through gestures and other visual signals. Their communication is simple and direct: nods, head tilts, and hand movements achieve exactly what they want them to. The Scoobies, however, are confused and accomplish the opposite of what they intend. When they are rendered silent they are also rendered useless, unsure of how to fight The Gentlemen. According to two Buffy essayists, part of the horror stemming from the arrival of The Gentlemen is the silence that makes the people of Sunnydale helpless, easy victims.

Jenkins and Stuart assert that through the loss of speech, the communication in "Hush" is transformed from the senseless locutionary to the perlocutionary: acts upon which ideas are conveyed into instant meaning and action. The scream uttered by Buffy to destroy The Gentlemen has severe implications for them although it has no real meaning. Even Tara's writing down Willow's room number before going to her dorm communicates that she has been thinking of Willow and wishes to find her. This act confirms to both Tara and the audience that she is interested in Willow.

=== Community ===
Although Sunnydale has long been familiar with demons and monsters who have inhabited the town and fed off its residents, in this episode the conventions by which societal functions are so disrupted by the unexplained silence that significant chaos results, enough to warrant both Riley and Buffy going on patrol to keep order. Buffy and Willow walk down a familiar street, arm-in-arm and easily startled, and see a bank closed and patrons running into a liquor store that is obviously open. The breakdown of order also causes sudden religious fervor; a group of people have gathered on the street to read the Bible (Revelation 15:1 is written on a signboard—an allusion to the seven angels with seven plagues as there are seven Gentlemen, according to author Nikki Stafford). Opportunistic capitalist fervor results in a man selling overpriced dry erase boards. Community, notes Patrick Shade (citing sociologist George Herbert Mead), consists of institutions such as language, religion, and economics. When one institution disappears, Sunnydale residents begin to depend more heavily on the others. Mostly, however, individuals are isolated from one another during the silence. Even the Scoobies find their bonds shaken, as they are unable to use the witty banter that has marked them as a group thus far. (This awkwardness extended even to the actors: the first silent scene the entire cast attempted was the Scoobies gathering in Giles' apartment following the discovery that all of Sunnydale's denizens had lost their voices. It took several rehearsals as the scene came out mistimed, with all of the actors having trouble playing off one another without the use of verbal cues, or all pantomiming over one another.) Without a common language to fall back upon the Scoobies are forced to depend on their shared history to help them recover well enough to be able to take action.

The resolution to this isolation and ineffectiveness is speaking out: restoring the voices of the people of Sunnydale. Shade states that this facet of the episode gives it a political overtone. Noel Murray from The A.V. Club writes that the silence imposed by The Gentlemen is a metaphor for how evil spreads: "When dissent is stifled, or people fail to tell the truth, or when we’re just distracted by other concerns, things can get out of hand." Authority figures in the series, such as the school principal, the mayor's office, and the Sunnydale Police Department, repeatedly either abet the town's endemic evil or choose not to hear about it. During "Hush", at Giles' apartment the Scoobies listen to a newscaster reporting that authorities in the town attribute the silence to a flu vaccine gone awry, causing mass laryngitis. Wilcox writes, "[H]ow many times will we see those in power maintain such a silence while evil proceeds? It is not surprising that [The Gentlemen's] attendants wear straitjackets; their garb suggests the insanity of such behavior—the pretense of civilized politeness while killing is accepted is a matter of course."

=== Fairy tales ===
Two other episodes in the Buffy canon are also based on, or have elements of, fairy tales: "Killed by Death", where only sick children can see a demon who sucks away their lives, and "Gingerbread", where a demon takes on the forms of Hansel and Gretel to create a moral panic in Sunnydale. "Hush" is often compared to these episodes because they contain similar elements. Whedon intended The Gentlemen to be Brothers Grimm-like monsters, with Giles playing the role of the wise man, Buffy the princess, and Tara the "little girl wandering through the woods". In this incarnation, however, Buffy is a swashbuckling princess whose scream saves the town. (Joss Whedon reported in the DVD commentary that the actual scream was dubbed from another actor.) Instead of being the damsel in distress she is the hero, breaking through a boarded-up window in the belfry, then grabbing a rope and swinging across the room to kill one of The Gentlemen's footmen by smashing her feet into his chest.

In many Buffy episodes, understanding why evil has appeared is important in knowing how to fight it, but the reasons for The Gentlemen's arrival and their need to take seven human hearts are never made explicit; they are simply there. According to Giles' overhead transparencies, they can appear in any town. Several Buffy scholars assert that a sexual element similar to what is presented in classic fairy tales is evident in "Hush". Buffy often has prophetic dreams, and it is in a dream that she first sees one of The Gentlemen; she sees a flash of his face just as Riley touches her shoulder. Buffy has only been sexually intimate twice before: with the vampire Angel, whose lovemaking cost him his soul, and with the womanizing Parker Abrams. Riley is notably different from both and Buffy's anxiety about becoming intimate with him, according to scholars, either calls The Gentlemen to Sunnydale or is represented by them. The Gentlemen murder by cutting chests open and removing hearts, penetrative acts. In Buffy's dream Riley says, "If I kiss you, it'll make the sun go down" and when he does so, it instantly becomes night, as if Buffy has crossed over a threshold. Riley's kiss creates physical and emotional intimacy, but initiates mental, intuitive knowledge as well: in this episode Buffy learns of Riley's secret role as a member of The Initiative. Threshold imagery is again used when Tara and Willow block the door with their combined efforts, shutting The Gentlemen out.

== Reception ==
When the episode was originally broadcast in the United States on December 14, 1999, it received a Nielsen rating of 4.1 and a share of 7, meaning that roughly 4.1 percent of all television-equipped households, and 7 percent of households watching television, were tuned in to the episode. The episode placed fifth in its timeslot and 93rd among broadcast television for the week of December 13–19, 1999. It was the most watched program on WB that night, and the second most watched program that week, trailing 7th Heaven.

"Hush" was highly praised when it aired, not only for its riskiness in presenting viewers with extended silence, but for the frightening qualities of The Gentlemen. Robert Bianco from USA Today comments, "(i)n a medium in which producers tend to grow bored with their own creations, either trashing them or taking them in increasingly bizarre directions, Whedon continues to find new ways to make his fabulously entertaining series richer and more compelling. With or without words, he's a TV treasure." In the Racine Journal Times and Ottawa Citizen, Chuck Barney writes, "I wondered if this enormously entertaining cult favorite would lose some starch once our favorite little slayer moved on to college. But happily, it continues to win us over with the way it deftly bounces between the genres of comedy, horror and romance. The recent silent episode (Hush) was brilliant." Alan Sepinwall in The Star-Ledger calls it a "magnificently daring episode", explaining "(w)hat makes it particularly brave is that, even when Buffy has been failing to click dramatically this year, the show has still been able to get by on the witty dialogue, which is all but absent after the first few scenes. Whedon finds ways to get around that, with several cast members—particularly Anthony Head as the scholarly Giles and Alyson Hannigan as nervous witch Willow—proving to be wonderfully expressive silent comedians."

Likewise, in the New York Daily News, David Bianculli states that the episode is "a true tour de force, and another inventive triumph for this vastly underrated series" Brian Courtis in Australia's Sunday Age agrees, and writes that "Hush" is "(c)lever, well-written and brightly directed ... Buffy at its best." Robert Hanks from The Independent in the UK writes that "Buffy the Vampire Slayer, in most weeks the funniest and cleverest programme on TV, reached new heights" with "Hush". Noel Murray in The A.V. Club calls it an "episode unlike any other, with a lusher score and some of the most genuinely disturbing imagery I've yet seen on Buffy." The episode was included among 13 of the scariest films or television shows by Salon.com, and justified by Stephanie Zacharek, who states it "scans just like one of those listless dreams in which you try to scream, and can't. Everybody's had 'em—and yet the way the eerie quiet of 'Hush' sucks you in, you feel as if the experience is privately, and unequivocally, your own."

"Hush" was the only episode of the entire Buffy series to be nominated for an Emmy Award in the Writing in a Drama Series category. It also received a Writers Guild of America Award nomination. Following the series finale in 2003, "Hush" continued to receive praise. Lisa Rosen in the Los Angeles Times states that the episode is "one of TV's most terrifying hours". Smashing Magazine counted "Hush" as one of the top ten television episodes that inspire creativity. Keith McDuffee of TV Squad named it the best Buffy episode in the series, writing "(i)f someone who had never seen Buffy (blasphemy!) asked me to show them just one episode of the show to get them hooked, this would be it". TV.com named it as the fourth most frightening episode in television history. Screen Rant called it "an intriguing, clever episode with a unique dynamic... It really is a genius installment and one of the finest television episodes ever produced."

Jarett Wieselman of the New York Post listed the scene in which Buffy mimes staking The Gentlemen and its humorous misunderstandings by the other characters among the top five best Buffy moments, especially praising Sarah Michelle Gellar's (Buffy) comedic acting. Nikki Stafford, author of Bite Me! The Unofficial Guide to Buffy the Vampire Slayer writes "Hush" is "mind-blowing" and "one of the best hours of television ever". For Buffy studies scholar Roz Kaveney, the primary reason "Hush" was successful was the acting strengths of the central cast. "Hush" is Alyson Hannigan's (Willow) favorite episode of the Buffy series, and the one Nicholas Brendon (Xander) considers the most frightening. Series writer Jane Espenson stated the episode "redefined what an episode of television could do".

Vox, ranking it at #3 of all 144 episodes on their "Worst to Best" list, wrote in honor of the show's 20th anniversary, "It's more of a given now that TV shows will eventually break with their own format for the fun of it, but that was far from inevitable when 'Hush' briefly made Buffy half silent movie, half straight horror... resulting in both frightening and hilarious scenes that have rightfully gone down as some of Buffy's most ingenious moments."
