= As You Were =

As You Were may refer to:

- As You Were (Liam Gallagher album), 2017
- As You Were (Show of Hands album), 2005
- "As You Were" (Buffy the Vampire Slayer), a 2002 television episode
- "As You Were" (M*A*S*H), a 1974 television episode
- "As You Were" (Haven), a 2010 television episode
- "As You Were" (White Collar), a 2011 television episode
- As You Were (film) a 1951 Dodo Doubleday film
- As You Were, a BBC musical radio program which featured James Moody
- As You Were (musical), a 1920 musical with music by E. Ray Goetz
