= Pangs =

- Buffy the Vampire Slayer episode
- Episode no.: Season 4 Episode 8
- Directed by: Michael Lange
- Written by: Jane Espenson
- Production code: 4ABB08
- Original air date: November 23, 1999

Guest appearances
- David Boreanaz as Angel; Marc Blucas as Riley Finn; Mercedes McNab as Harmony Kendall; Emma Caulfield as Anya; Leonard Roberts as Forrest Gates; Bailey Chase as Graham Miller; Tod Thawley as Hus - The Chumash Spirit; Margaret Easley as Curator; William Vogt as Jamie; Mark Ankeny as Dean Guerrero

Episode chronology
← Previous "The Initiative"	Next → "Something Blue"
- Buffy the Vampire Slayer season 4

"Pangs" is the eighth episode of season 4 of the television show Buffy the Vampire Slayer. It was written by Jane Espenson, directed by Michael Lange, and first broadcast on November 23, 1999 on The WB.

On Thanksgiving, Buffy encounters the restless and vengeful spirit of a member of a fictionalized portrayal of the aboriginal Chumash tribe, who, in the show's setting, were wiped out by white settlers. During a tense confrontation, the Slayer fights a losing battle against her formidable foe - but a mysterious protector watches over her from the shadows.

Buffy scholar Rhonda V. Wilcox has written, "It is unquestionably one of the most controversial episodes of Buffy. It is also one of Buffy creator Joss Whedon's declared favorites."

== Plot ==
Buffy, patrolling, finds a vampire, engages, and then slays him, while Angel watches her from behind some bushes. The college's Dean Guerrero orates for the groundbreaking ceremony for the new Anthropology building, and Xander is one of the construction workers. Xander begins to dig, but the ground suddenly caves out under him, and he drops into an old abandoned building, which is soon discovered to be a long-lost Mission, buried underground in an earthquake centuries ago.

Buffy, upset that her mother is going to be out of town for Thanksgiving, decides to cook her own Thanksgiving dinner at Giles' apartment and invite all her friends. Anya arrives at Xander's house to find him incredibly sick, and right away starts taking care of him.

A green haze comes up from the old Mission and goes to the Cultural Center where some weapons are being kept. After the haze comes in contact with a knife, it turns into a large Native American man and kills the curator. Buffy and Willow later secretly investigate the murder, and wonder why the curator's body is missing an ear. They discover that a Chumash knife is missing.

After Giles agrees to look up information on the Chumash people, and Buffy leaves, Angel appears from Giles's back room, having come to Sunnydale because his friend had a vision of Buffy in danger. Willow goes to get coffee and runs into Angel. He tells her he is just looking out for Buffy because she might be in trouble. Buffy attempts to find a reverend in a church for information on the Chumash, but finds him having been hanged by the Native American man, Hus, who attacks her before fleeing. When Willow researches the Chumash, she discovers that they were imprisoned into slavery and forced labor for various supposed misdeeds, and that they attacked their accusers by severing their ears in retaliation. Buffy realizes that Hus is recreating the wrongs done to his people in vengeance. After overhearing the conversation from the bushes, Hus returns to the Mission where he resurrects his warriors.

Covered in a blanket and in terrible shape, Spike runs through the woods, trying to escape Riley and his Initiative team as they look for him. Starving, Spike tries to get food from Harmony, but she threatens him with a stake and he leaves. With only a blanket to protect him from the sun, Spike shows up at Giles' apartment, asking for help. Buffy is reluctant to give in, but after he offers inside information on the Initiative and Willow helps him explain that he cannot bite anyone anymore, she allows him in. Giles conjures that Hus is seeking out figures of authority as his targets, and Buffy worries that Guerrero could be next. When Willow feels bad about how their people treated the Chumash and refuses to cast a spell to kill the spirits, Spike calls the gang out on their apologetic behavior towards them. He especially points out that Hus would not accept anyone's apologies for rightfully killing his people as a conquering nation, and that Buffy must persevere and kill him in order to survive. Willow, Xander and Anya leave to warn Guerrero as Buffy and Giles prep for dinner.

The spirits attack Buffy, Giles, and Spike with arrows. Helplessly tied to a chair, all Spike can do is try to move out of the way as he gets hit with arrows. Willow, Xander, and Anya encounter Angel on their way back, and Angel conjures that as Hus is a warrior, he and the Chumash went after the strongest fighter: Buffy. Willow, Xander and Anya rush back to Giles' apartment, with Angel secretly helping them out. Hus turns into a large black bear. Buffy fight the bear and stabs him, causing the spirits to disappear.

Angel walks away without being seen by Buffy, and later the gang sits down to Thanksgiving dinner, with Spike joining them whilst still tied up. Xander accidentally lets it slip that Angel was in town.

== Production ==
Wilcox writes, "As Espenson says, "The core of it was something Joss had wanted to do for a long time, which is have a dead Indian at Thanksgiving — a very poetic illustration, I think, that we do kind of live in this country by virtue of some very ugly conquest. And the next thing you know we had a very non-threatening bear and some funny syphilis." ("Writing" 111)"

== Themes ==
Sally Eamons-Featherston comments that it stands out from other Buffy episodes for dealing with the issue of race. Its moral complexity is symbolised by Buffy's initial appearance in a black hat, traditionally the sign of a Western villain, and the program makes several references to the Western genre. The episode was however criticised in The Truth of Buffy: Essays on Fiction Illuminating Reality (2008) for stereotyping Native Americans, particularly Chumashes, who actually have a complex culture, while the Chumash warrior is portrayed here as speaking in a highly clichéd way.

== Critical reaction ==
Vox, ranking it at #67 of all 144 episodes, writes, "Buffy takes the 'main character suddenly possessed by manic need for perfect holiday' trope and raises it a rather uncomfortable story about a Native American vengeance demon, which dances around discussing America's ugly legacy of genocide but never actually comes to any conclusions. Still, there are some funny moments ("You made a bear! Undo it! Undo it!") and the enjoyable runner of Angel being back in town and revealing himself to all the Scoobies but Buffy is capped off by the tiny, perfect clink of Buffy’s fork falling on her plate that plays over the final credits, as the ex-boyfriend-shaped cat finally comes out of the bag."

Billie Doux, giving a rating of 4 out of 4 stakes, enjoys how "poor, alienated, new-to-college, post-Angel Buffy is compelled to create her own version of a Charlie Brown Thanksgiving, all the while being attacked by perhaps justifiably homicidal Native American spirits. Whedon et al. continued to make Spike more sympathetic, starting with that hilarious Dickensian scene of Spike, frozen and starving, peering into a window at vampires feasting... and secondly, having him tied to a chair and hit with arrows during the second half of the episode."

The A.V. Club called it "an outrageously entertaining episode", noting the many funny moments but also the complex moral debate over the Native American "evil". Persephone Magazine called it the start of a run of three excellent episodes, including Something Blue and Hush.
