= Restless (Buffy the Vampire Slayer) =

- Buffy the Vampire Slayer episode
- Buffy in her dream with the first Slayer behind her. This episode features a unique visual style, as shown here, where much of the frame is empty while the focal point is in one corner.
- Episode no.: Season 4 Episode 22
- Directed by: Joss Whedon
- Written by: Joss Whedon
- Cinematography by: Michael Gershman
- Production code: 4ABB22
- Original air date: May 23, 2000
- Running time: 44 minutes

Guest appearances
- Kristine Sutherland as Joyce Summers; Amber Benson as Tara Maclay; Mercedes McNab as Harmony Kendall; David Wells as The Cheese Man; Michael Harney as Xander's Father; George Hertzberg as Adam; Emma Caulfield as Anya; Seth Green as Oz; Armin Shimerman as Principal Snyder; Sharon Ferguson as Primitive; Phina Oruche as Olivia; Rob Boltin as Soldier

Episode chronology
← Previous "Primeval"	Next → "Buffy vs. Dracula"
- Buffy the Vampire Slayer season 4

"Restless" is the 22nd episode and season finale of season four of the supernatural drama television series Buffy the Vampire Slayer (1997–2003), and the 78th episode of the series overall. The episode was written and directed by the show's creator Joss Whedon and originally aired on The WB in the United States on May 23, 2000.

The premise of Buffy the Vampire Slayer is that an adolescent girl, Buffy Summers, is chosen by mystical forces and given superhuman powers to kill vampires, demons, and other evil creatures in the fictional town of Sunnydale. She is supported by a close circle of family and friends, nicknamed the Scooby Gang. "Restless" centers on the dreams of the four main characters after enduring an exhausting fight in the previous episode. The dreams are used to comment on the characters—their fears, their past and their possible future. Consistent with each dream is the presence of the First Slayer who hunts and kills them one by one until, in the final sequence, she is confronted and disempowered by Buffy.

The episode serves as a coda to the fourth season instead of a climax, as Whedon wanted to achieve something different for a season finale. Whedon experimented with several filming techniques to make the episode as dreamlike as possible. The episode also foreshadows upcoming events, most notably the first appearance of Buffy's sister Dawn. Buffy scholar Nikki Stafford calls the surrealistic episode "unprecedented in television", saying it is "so jam-packed with information that we'll probably be seeing allusions to it for the rest of the series", and referring to it as a "mysterious lead-in to the emotionally turbulent season five". "Restless" received high praise from critics upon airing, particularly for its character development, visual direction, and wit. It is frequently noted as one of the best episodes of the series.

== Background ==
In the series, Buffy Summers is a teenager who, at the age of fifteen, was chosen by mystical forces to be the latest Slayer, a girl endowed with superhuman powers to fight and defeat vampires, demons, and other evil forces. After moving with her mother, Joyce (Kristine Sutherland), to the fictional town of Sunnydale, she befriends Willow Rosenberg (Alyson Hannigan) and Xander Harris (Nicholas Brendon), who join her in the struggle against evil. They are guided by Buffy's "Watcher", Rupert Giles (Anthony Stewart Head), who is well-versed in demonology and is responsible for Buffy's training as a Slayer. The group collectively refer to themselves as the Scooby Gang. During season two, Willow begins to experiment with magic, eventually becoming a formidable witch.

Each season of Buffy the Vampire Slayer (often simplified as Buffy) presents an overall story arc which episodes tie into, as well as a specific manifestation of evil known as the Big Bad. As noted by Buffy scholar Roz Kaveney, episodes in the fourth season address authority, order, and the estrangement from the self and others as Buffy and her friends take on new roles after high school.

Season four begins with Buffy and Willow starting college, attending U.C. Sunnydale, while Xander works at a series of odd jobs and begins dating Anya Jenkins (Emma Caulfield), who lived for 1,100 years as a vengeance demon before losing her powers and getting stuck in the body of a teenager. In the fourth season, Willow becomes romantically involved with fellow-student Tara Maclay (Amber Benson), an experienced witch. The Big Bad in season four is the result of the work of a covert military force called "The Initiative" who are capturing and performing experiments on vampires and demons in Sunnydale. Buffy and her friends discover that chief amongst these experiments is the creation of a human-cyber-demonoid hybrid known as Adam (George Hertzberg), whose programming has gone terribly wrong, leading him to wreak havoc on the town. Buffy's challenge is to find a way to disempower him, something she and the Scoobies achieve in the penultimate episode of season four, "Primeval". In order to do this, the four magically join their essences together to create a single "super Slayer"; while the others perform a ritual, Buffy confronts and defeats Adam while mystically empowered with Giles' mind, Xander's heart, and Willow's spirit aiding her. The ritual employs four tarot-like cards: Manus (meaning hands or strength) represents Buffy, Sophus (meaning teacher or wise) represents Giles, Animus (meaning courage, or heart) represents Xander, and Spiritus (meaning spirit and magical power) represents Willow. These symbols will become relevant to the central motif in each of the episode's four dream sequences.

== Plot ==
Following their victory over Adam; Buffy, Xander, Willow, and Giles meet at Buffy's to relax with movies, including Apocalypse Now. They quickly fall asleep and are each confronted by a primitive girl in their dreams.

Willow's dream opens with Willow painting Sappho's love poem, Hymn to Aphrodite, in Greek onto Tara's back. She then finds herself on the Sunnydale High school stage, about to perform in a radically changed Death of a Salesman, with Riley playing a cowboy, Buffy as a flapper and Harmony (a popular girl in high school who snubbed Willow, and who became a vampire at the end of Season 3) goofily trying to bite Giles' neck. Willow realizes with increasing uneasiness that she knows neither her lines nor her role. Buffy then takes Willow to stand in front of a classroom in the same nerdy clothes she wore in "Welcome to the Hellmouth" and "The Harvest" at the beginning of the series. Xander mocks her as she nervously begins to read her book report. Oz and Tara—Willow's ex-boyfriend and current girlfriend—flirt with each other while watching Willow recite. Suddenly, Willow is attacked and has the life sucked out of her by the primitive girl.

Xander's dream begins when he wakes on Buffy's couch. After excusing himself to use the restroom, he finds himself the object of an attempted seduction by Joyce. In the restroom, he starts to unzip, then realizes that the bathroom is attached to a large white room with many men in white coats ready to observe and take notes on his performance. He then meets Buffy, Giles, and Spike in a playground; Spike – unaffected by daylight – tells him that Giles is going to teach him to be a Watcher, as Buffy plays in a sandbox. Xander then finds himself in an ice cream truck with Anya; Willow and Tara (wearing skimpy clothing and garish make-up) are in the back, and they invite him to join them. He tries to do so, only to end up in the basement where his parents allow him to live. He goes to the university and comes across Giles, who starts revealing the reason for the dream, but who suddenly switches to speaking in French. Xander next finds himself in a reenactment of the Apocalypse Now scene between a captive Captain Benjamin Willard and Colonel Walter Kurtz, with Principal Snyder as Kurtz. Throughout the sequence Xander finds himself in his basement again and again, chased by an unseen pursuer, who is revealed as the primitive girl when she tears his heart out.

Giles' dream begins with Giles swinging a watch in front of Buffy. They are in Giles' apartment, which has been stripped of furniture but for a chair and a bed. She laughs, and Giles' dream cuts to a family scene with Buffy and his girlfriend Olivia at a fairground. Quicker than the others to understand that something is wrong, he confronts Spike, who is posing for a photo-shoot in his crypt. In The Bronze, he meets Anya failing as a stand-up comic, and Willow and Xander (with a bloody chest wound), who warn him of their attacker. He breaks into song, giving suggestions on how to deal with what hunts them, but when the sound system breaks down, he crawls backstage to trace a wiring fault. He begins to realize who his pursuer is, just as she scalps him.

In the final dream sequence, Buffy is woken by Anya in her dorm room. She then finds herself in her room at home, where Tara speaks cryptically about the future. At the university, Buffy talks to her mother, who lives in the walls, then meets Riley at the Initiative. He has been promoted to Surgeon General and is drawing up plans with Adam (now in ordinary human form) for world domination. The three of them are interrupted by a demon attack, and Riley and Adam start to make a pillow fort. When Buffy finds her weapons bag, the only thing in it is mud, which she smears on her face. She is then transported to the desert and finally confronts the pre-verbal First Slayer; Tara is present to speak for her. Through Tara, the primitive girl reveals herself to be the First Slayer and tells Buffy that she cannot have friends and must work alone, which Buffy rejects. The Slayers fight in the desert and then in Buffy's living room next to her dying friends until Buffy realizes that she can stop the fight mentally by simply ignoring the First Slayer. She refuses to fight and walks away from the First Slayer; the First Slayer vanishes, and everybody wakes up.

After they wake up, the four of them then discuss what happened, with Giles realizing that using the enjoining spell to share Buffy's power between them caused the First Slayer to attack. Going upstairs, Buffy recalls the First Slayer's warning that she has no idea what lies ahead of her.

== Production and writing ==
The most important thing when I first started it was that the dreams be dreamlike... It's about combining the totally surreal with the totally mundane... It then became a question of basically writing poetry...basically free-associating. Obviously, things had to get worse at the end of each act—people had to be in peril because this thing was trying to kill them in their dreams. But beyond that, there really was no structure. So I was basically sitting down to write a forty-minute tone poem.

— Joss Whedon describing the writing process and the episode's structure.

Previous seasons of Buffy the Vampire Slayer had ended with an action episode which tied up all the threads of the season's main plot line, but series creator Joss Whedon wanted to end season four differently. The penultimate episode, "Primeval", had concluded the Initiative storyline, but Whedon felt the season's overall story arc had not been as cohesive as it could have been, and therefore chose to create an episode to act as a "grace note" to the season, an episode which would comment on each of the four main characters and what they had just been through. While talking about the writing of the episode, Whedon said it had been like writing poetry, a process he found "liberating and strange". Like the earlier "Hush" — an episode with almost no dialogue — he viewed the episode as an exercise in form and writing, and what it means to write. The episode has no real structure, which was a departure for Whedon, as everything he had written before was constructed before even starting the script. Yet despite its fragmented style, the episode unfolds coherently in four discrete acts, each act comprising one character's dream.

=== Filming techniques ===
It's all—anything goes in a dream as long as it doesn't feel like a trick. You know, we dutch the camera occasionally, we use wide angles occasionally. But every dream sequence that I've seen, almost, looked like some sort of trick, and my intent was to make something that looked very naturalistic, but at the same time very avant-garde. And as long as you're true to the emotion of the piece, then it works. If it clashes with it, then it doesn't.

— Joss Whedon on the techniques used in the episode.

Whedon used a variety of cinematographic techniques to achieve the dreamlike quality of "Restless". He used tracking shots with a Steadicam to follow the characters from place to place, creating a flow in the way of real dreams, where there are no logical connections between places and things. In Giles' dream, he walks from a carnival grounds into Spike's crypt, then through a corridor and straight into The Bronze, three locations not related to one another. Whedon was able to do this by simply having actor Anthony Stewart Head walk through the sets as they were built; this effortlessly created a sense of dreamlike dislocation. Another example of this occurs when, in Xander's dream, he walks from the front of the moving ice cream van towards the back, crawls up and over some boxes, through a window, and drops into his basement. In the theater scene during Willow's dream, a Frazier lens was used to provide a large depth of field, allowing both the foreground and background to be in focus at the same time, while in Xander's dream, as he moves from room to room in Buffy's house to the university dorm rooms, Whedon used a 17 mm lens to give a sense of motion as the camera passes by walls. Whedon also used unusual framing for shots, often leaving much of the frame empty, with a character being placed near the bottom or off to the side. The scenes in Spike's crypt, part of Giles' dream, were shot in black-and-white to emphasize that Spike is seen as "an old 30s movie villain".

An example of overexposure in an exterior shot. In this scene Whedon also let the shots last longer than usual before cutting.

The outdoor scene in which Xander sees Buffy in the sandbox was intentionally overexposed, intensifying the foreground and blowing out the background, making the sky look white; flash frames were also used in the shot of Buffy in the desert. Whedon allowed some shots to last far longer than is common in a television episode; this cinematic technique allowed the images to take on meaning. Highly stylized lighting is used throughout Xander's dream. In the university hallway the scene is lit with green and orange gels, while the almost shot-for-shot re-creation of the Apocalypse Now section is lit with carefully controlled spotlights which allow the background to fall out to black. Whedon cites The Limey as an inspiration for the unnaturally colored university sequence, and had the scene from Apocalypse Now playing on tape during filming to ensure as close a match as possible for that sequence. When Xander is driving the ice cream truck with Anya, the backgrounds outside the car intentionally look fake, to give a sense of stillness where there should be motion. Whedon originally wanted to use rear-screen projection for the driving scene, but had to utilize greenscreen instead, as rear-screen projection would be difficult to set up on their stages. Some special effects shots came about by accident; in his commentary Whedon explains that when Buffy smeared the mud all over her face, it looked as though she was giving herself a facial. He therefore dissolved the shot into a negative image, creating intense colors that made the shot more interesting.

Dynamic editing contributed to the surrealistic nature of the episode. Abrupt cuts from close-up to extreme wide angles and sudden shifts from normal speed to super slow-motion are used in Buffy's dream: several sequences become slow-motion partway through them, then revert to normal speed as they continue. Xander's dream features mismatches between sound and image: characters are sometimes shown not speaking even as their voices are heard. Additionally, silence is used frequently, to both reflect the characters' disorientation and to unsettle the audience. Whedon cited films by Steven Soderbergh as his main inspirations for the odd editing, especially The Limey and The Underneath. He also listed Orson Welles' version of The Trial and Stanley Kubrick's Eyes Wide Shut as inspirations for many of his shooting and editing decisions.

=== Cast ===
Besides the main cast, the episode features several appearances by returning and currently recurring characters, mostly within the dream sequences.

- Seth Green, who left the series earlier in the season, makes a brief appearance as Oz in Willow's dream.
- Armin Shimerman, whose character Principal Snyder was killed off in the season three finale, appears as Kurtz in the Apocalypse Now scene. Media analyst Matthias Kuzina observed that the character of Snyder, a "former minion of evil", is "an almost perfect reincarnation" of Kurtz.
- Amber Benson appears as Tara in the dream sequences, as both Willow's girlfriend and a spirit guide to Buffy. Whedon commented on her appearances in Buffy's dream: "The idea that Tara would be her spirit guide made sense because she didn't have that particular relationship with Tara, and Tara has a kind of good Wiccan mystical energy."
- George Hertzberg appears as Adam, although in human form rather than in the demon/cyborg makeup he had appeared in throughout the season.
- Mercedes McNab appears as Harmony Kendall, and is present during Willow's dream as both an ordinary classmate and an inept vampire.
- Phina Oruche appears as Olivia in Giles's dream heavily pregnant and pushing a baby stroller.
- Kristine Sutherland appears as Joyce Summers, Buffy's mother. Whedon enjoyed that she got "to play just completely sexy [in Xander's dream], because when you play the mom on a show you're sort of relegated to momhood, so it was nice to see that side of her."

It was during the filming of this episode that Michelle Trachtenberg, who would go on to play Buffy's sister Dawn in season five, first visited the set. Sarah Michelle Gellar had worked with her previously and suggested to Joss Whedon that she read for the part of Dawn.

=== Music ===
In Giles' dream, actor Anthony Stewart Head sings "The Exposition Song"; this was the third time he sang during the season. The song was written by Joss Whedon, arranged by composer Christophe Beck, and performed by Four Star Mary. Beck appears in the scene playing the piano, while members of Four Star Mary play the other instruments. From seasons two to four of the series, Four Star Mary were the real band behind character Oz's fictional band, Dingoes Ate My Baby.

== Analysis ==
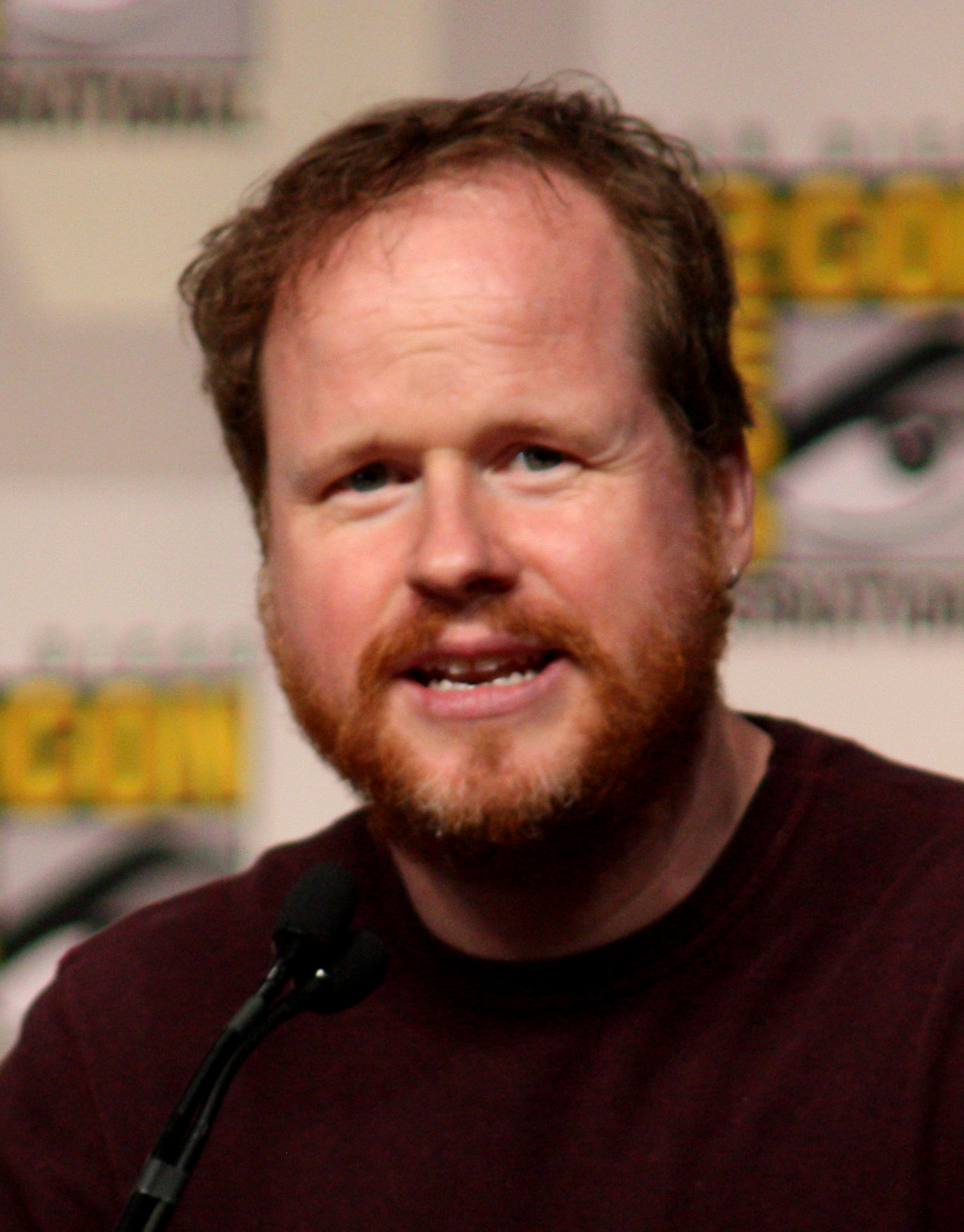
Writer and director Joss Whedon provided an in-depth analysis of the dreams in his audio commentary for the episode.

Each dream acts as a character study, exploring the fears and future of the dreamer. Willow, Xander, and Giles are stalked by a shadowy figure, then killed within their dreams. The way in which each is killed is directly related to the role they had assumed when melding with Buffy in the previous episode—that role is indicated by the Tarot-like card used to symbolize the character's essence. Willow's card had been Spiritus, representing her magical powers; she is killed by having her spirit sucked out of her. Xander's card had been Animus, representing his heart; he is killed by having his heart ripped out. Giles had been represented by the card Sophus, a symbol of his intellect and role as teacher; he is killed by being scalped. Buffy's card, Manus, was representative of her physical strength. In her dream the stalker is revealed as the primitive first slayer, who confronts her aggressively. The two fight, but the First Slayer is defeated when Buffy realizes a key difference between them: the First Slayer was alone and isolated, while Buffy is unique among Slayers in that she has friends and a life beyond slaying, factors which make her the greatest Slayer ever.

In Willow's dream she has an intimate conversation with her girlfriend Tara while painting a Sapphic love poem on her bare back. She talks about her unwillingness to leave Tara's dorm room, a place of comfort and security, but finds herself at college anyway. She struggles to find her place in a bizarre school theater production, apparently Death of a Salesman, while her friends and classmates are fully costumed, prepared, and ready to go on stage. Her confusion represents her lack of self-confidence, her fear that she still does not fit in or have a place in the world, unlike those around her, who are notably less intelligent but instinctively understand the strange idiosyncratic rules. She wears ordinary clothes, but the others repeatedly comment on the excellence of her "costume", a reference to her fear that her friends do not see what she has grown into, but rather what she was when younger: nerdy and awkward. This fear is confirmed when Buffy strips off her shirt and jeans, revealing the same unfashionable turtleneck and corduroy jumper she wore in episode one of the series, four years earlier, before her demon-fighting experiences and study of magic increased her confidence and competence. Willow stands anxiously at the front of the class, trying to read a paper, while her classmates express their boredom with listening to her and Oz flirtily whispers into Tara's ear, until she is attacked by the First Slayer and her breath is sucked out of her body.

Whedon stated that the maze of red curtains on the stage in Willow's dream are not a direct homage to Twin Peaks, as some have posited, but rather represent the safety and comfort of being with Tara, and are a sexual metaphor as well.

The main theme of Xander's dream is his sense of failure and of being left behind as his friends move ahead in life. His fear that he is stuck is reiterated throughout his dream by his inability to escape his basement bedroom in his parents' home, and also escape from his parents' way of life–argumentative and neglectful. No matter where his dream takes him, he ends up back in the basement. He also struggles to understand and feel comfortable with his sexuality, heavily idealizing and sexualizing Joyce, Willow and Tara and seeing Anya, his girlfriend, as distant and impenetrable and Buffy, who he still has a lingering crush on, as a little girl playing in a sandpit who calls him her 'big brother'. As the only one of the Scoobies not in college, he feels anxiety about his ability to understand and keep up with ideas and conversations, a fear which is realized when he goes to the university, a place he already feels excluded from, and finds that he cannot understand what people say to him. Aware that he is being chased and is in danger, he asks Giles what is happening but cannot understand his answer, nor what Anya says to him, as they are both inexplicably speaking French. He exclaims, "I don't understand!" During his dream both Buffy and Willow tell him, "I'm way ahead of you," and Giles tells him "the others have gone on ahead," underscoring his fear that this is really the case.

Giles' dream presents a choice: either to remain a father figure and Watcher to Buffy, or to begin his own life, represented by the presence of his girlfriend Olivia, who pushes an empty baby stroller. During this part of his dream, Buffy is dressed as a child, with pigtails, and is unable to throw a ball straight without his help and instruction, an indication of his fear that she will be unable to do her job without his guidance. Later, Olivia is seen weeping, while the baby stroller has been overturned and abandoned, signifying elements of his unfulfilled life, such as marriage and children. Later, in The Bronze, he is explaining the reason they are all being stalked and attacked, performing his job as Watcher, but his singing this information represents his unfulfilled longing to be a musician, something he's been exploring privately throughout the season.

The major theme of Buffy's dream is her fear of the personal cost of her life as a Slayer, the isolation and loneliness she is forced to endure. This theme of aloneness is reiterated by several shots in which she is alone in the frame, most notably the wide shot of her in the vast and empty desert. Another source of anxiety is her relationship with her current boyfriend, Riley, whom she finds plotting world domination with Adam in his original, human, form. She fears what Riley could turn into as a result of his alliance with the military. She also fears the destabilizing effect of this alliance on their relationship, and the destabilizing effect of this relationship on her life as the slayer. She is shown putting mud on her face, mimicking the mud mask of the primal, First Slayer. By the end of her encounter in the desert with the First Slayer, Buffy realizes that she does not have to be entirely alone, that it is her closeness to friends and family that makes her a great Slayer, and once she experiences this revelation, the efforts of the First Slayer to continue to engage her in battle become fruitless and increasingly comical. The dream finally ends in a mundane way, as Buffy refuses to accept a tragic climax and instead insists on normality in her life.

All of the many elements in the dream sequences have meaning, with the exception of the Cheese Man. Whedon explains: "...the Cheese Man—meaningless. Why? Because I needed something in the show that was meaningless, because there is always something in the dream that doesn't make any sense at all. In this case it was the Cheese Man. He confounds everybody because of that, and people ascribe him meaning. This to me means that we're being successful, because this means they're not worried about everything else, which means they sort of did understand most other things."

=== Foreshadowing ===
Buffy's dream includes several references to past and future episodes. In a dream sequence in the season three finale, Faith says "Little Miss Muffet counting down from 7-3-0"; foreshadowing Dawn's arrival two years later in season five. This number appears (as 7:30) on a clock in Buffy's dream in "Restless". Buffy says, "It's so late." Tara replies, "Oh... that clock's completely wrong." A year has now passed, making the previous number of days to her arrival incorrect. When Buffy leaves the room, Tara tells her, "Be back before Dawn." The character Dawn appears in the next episode. Tara's words to Buffy, "You think you know what's to come, what you are. You haven't even begun." are repeated by Dracula to Buffy in the following episode ("Buffy vs. Dracula"). In Xander's dream, Giles and Spike swing together on a swing set, with Spike wearing a tweed jacket. Giles comments, "Spike's like a son to me." In "Tabula Rasa" (season six), when the characters lose their memories, Spike wears the same tweed jacket and believes Giles is his father.

== Reception ==
The episode received critical praise and is often included on lists of the best episodes of Buffy the Vampire Slayer. In Entertainment Weekly's list of the 25 best Whedonverse episodes—including episodes from Buffy, as well as Angel, Firefly and Dollhouse—"Restless" placed at #20, where they called it "Visually lush and trippy," and said, "...it reestablished that this genre show was really and truly a deeply affecting character drama with a delightfully bent sense of humor." At Syfy.co.uk, the episode was listed as the seventh best episode in their list of the top 10 Buffy episodes, saying "This surreal episode marks the show's turning point, as it moved from a very well-executed urban fantasy drama series to something more creative, more thoughtful, and more surprising than pretty much anything else on television." In The Futon Critic's list of the 20 best episodes of 2000, the episode was placed at #1, with the author calling it an even more daring episode than "Hush", another acclaimed episode from the fourth season. In other publications lists of the best Buffy episodes, "Restless" placed at #7 by /Film, TV Guide, and Vox, #6 by The Guardian, #5 by Den of Geek, and #4 by TVLine. Rolling Stone named it the fourth-best episode of the series, calling it "one of the boldest, most daring and most enigmatic episodes" and that "it's hilarious and fascinating, beautiful and moving, an exhibition in surrealist television."

At Slayage.com, the Online Journal of Buffy Studies, author Daniel Erenberg placed the episode as the second best of the series; stating that the episode "lends itself to infinite interpretations. No one watches it the same way. That's the mark of a true masterpiece." When Noel Murray of The A.V. Club reviewed "Restless" in 2009, after beginning his first look at the series in 2008, he praised Joss Whedon's ability to represent what dreams are actually like. The A.V. Club also included "Restless" as an "essential episode" of the series in their list of the best TV series of the 2000s, in which Buffy the Vampire Slayer placed at #25. "Restless" was listed at #10 in The A.V. Club's list of "21 TV episodes that do dream sequences right", commenting, "This device allows for a lot of surreal images and moments of weird comedy" and that "there are also some striking, unsettling touches that have the indefinable power and strangeness of a real dream." The episode was listed as #1 in Daily Kos' list of the top 10 episodes of the series, and the episode was listed as the second best episode featuring dream sequences by USA Today. In series creator Joss Whedon's own list of his favorite episodes, he includes "Restless", saying "Most people sort of shake their heads at it. It was different, but not pointless."

In 2001, the episode received two nominations for the Make-Up Artists and Hair Stylists Guild Awards, for Best Contemporary Makeup in a Series and Best Contemporary Hair Styling in a Series.

In its original broadcast on May 23, 2000, on The WB, the episode received 4.5 million viewers according to Nielsen ratings.
