= Beneath You =

- Buffy the Vampire Slayer episode
- Episode no.: Season 7 Episode 2
- Directed by: Nick Marck
- Written by: Doug Petrie
- Production code: 7ABB02
- Original air date: October 1, 2002

Guest appearances
- Anthony Stewart Head as Rupert Giles; Kaarina Aufranc as Nancy; D.B. Woodside as Principal Wood; Tess Hall as Punk Girl; Benita Krista Nall as Young Woman; Jack Sundmacher as Ronnie

Episode chronology
← Previous "Lessons"	Next → "Same Time, Same Place"
- Buffy the Vampire Slayer season 7

"Beneath You" is the second episode of the seventh and final season of the television show Buffy the Vampire Slayer. The episode aired on October 1, 2002 on UPN.

== Plot ==
In Frankfurt, Germany, a young woman races frantically away from hooded figures similar to the robed men in Istanbul down deserted corridors above a bustling nightclub. She dashes through an exterior door, scales down the building, and, believing herself safe, leaves the building at the street level. Robed pursuers appear and push her back through the door. One of the robed figures pulls a long curved dagger. She blocks his swing, but misses the next. The assassins re-sheath their daggers and depart. The young woman opens her deadened eyes and says in a deep, inhuman voice, "From beneath you, it devours."

Dawn awakens Buffy from the nightmare in which she witnessed the German woman's murder and Buffy questions the meaning of her dream. Elsewhere in Sunnydale, something large tears through the ground. Spike sneaks around in the school basement he calls home, seemingly headed for a rat while he speaks aloud. Everything around him begins to shake and he falls to the ground, screaming. Xander drives Buffy and Dawn to school and they talk about high school and Xander's relationship problems. Principal Wood introduces Buffy to her new job and cubicle where she will be working. Buffy sneaks down to the basement in search of Spike, but does not find him. A woman named Nancy walks her small dog along the sidewalk, but while her back is turned, something sucks the dog through the pavement and into the ground. She runs away and right into Xander, who takes her to the safety of Buffy's house.

The remaining Scooby Gang console Nancy and promise to deal with this unusual creature. Much to everyone's surprise, a cleaned up version of Spike joins them in the living room and offers his assistance in the battle. Spike wants to talk with Buffy, but Dawn and Xander are not happy to see him or with the fact that Buffy did not inform them that she saw Spike earlier. Buffy goes to talk with Spike privately and he offers to help deal with this underground monster. Buffy eventually agrees to let him help, then explains the game plan to the rest of the group. As Spike leaves with Buffy for patrol, Dawn threatens to kill him if he ever again harms or touches Buffy. Spike is somewhat unnerved by this which is surprising since he is usually not easily frightened.

While examining the scene where the dog was eaten, Spike explains that the manifest spirits from the school were the cause of his temporary insanity. Buffy is uncomfortable around him and he does not apologize for what he did, just admits to changing. Meanwhile, Xander takes Nancy home and she asks him on a date. The ground rumbles and a giant worm chases them down a hallway and emerges from the ground with a roar. Once the worm goes away and the two are safe, Nancy starts to talk about her abusive ex-boyfriend Ronnie, and Xander quickly concludes that she made a wish to a vengeance demon.

Buffy and the gang confront Anya at the Bronze and get her to admit to making Nancy's ex-boyfriend Ronnie into a Sluggoth demon. Nancy learns that Buffy and Spike, Spike and Anya, and Anya and Xander had been involved. Anya suddenly realizes that Spike has a soul, but Spike tries to stop her from spilling the news to the rest of the group. He starts to attack Anya and she turns on him, using her vengeance demon strength. Buffy steps in and beats up on Spike while he hits back with a verbal assault of what he did instead of his fists. The fight sends Nancy on the run alone, but her wormy ex-boyfriend is hot on her trail. Meanwhile, Xander tries to convince Anya to reverse the curse on Ronnie, but it is not something she can do easily. She admits that she is facing immense pressure in her line of vengeance work from her colleagues and D'Hoffryn ever since Xander left her at the altar; but Xander urges her to stop blaming him for her own mistakes.

Buffy arrives in time to rescue Nancy from certain death and before Buffy can begin to battle with the giant worm, Spike intervenes. After a few hits with a metal pole, he goes to stab the worm only to have it turn back into Ronnie's human form before Spike makes contact. Spike's chip fires as he realizes that he has attacked a human being. He is terrified as he feels remorse, and he warns Buffy that "from beneath you, it devours." Anya and Xander arrive on the scene and Anya knows she will be punished for reversing the spell.

Buffy chases after Spike and finds him in a church. He is confused and speaks metaphors of what he really is to Buffy. He concludes that she is there to use him like she did before, but Buffy is quick to correct him. He tries to explain what he did, to get the missing piece that would allow him to become what she wanted, and that Angel should have warned him of the consequences. Buffy then understands that he got his soul back and is shocked by the revelation. Spike continues to speak of all the voices that are in his head, those of the people he tortured and killed as a vampire, and also that of coming evil beneath. Buffy asks him why he got his soul back, and Spike replies that it was for her forgiveness. Spike turns to a large cross at the front of the church and drapes himself onto it, letting it burn him. Tears flow down Buffy's cheeks as she looks on.

In England, Willow struggles with the need to return to Sunnydale where she will be forced to face her friends and the trouble she caused. A taxi awaits her as Giles listens to her verbalize her fears and he convinces her that even if her friends do not want her back, her presence on the Hellmouth will be important.

== Production ==
About the ending and his performance, James Marsters says: "There was a scene between Buffy and me in a church, and I think I ended up draping myself over a cross. I was very, very sad. [It was] a very dramatic scene. [Joss Whedon] didn’t direct it. He saw the footage and came up to me and he said, 'Okay, James, I’ve got good news and bad news. What do you want?' I said, 'Well, give me the bad news first.' He said, 'Okay. That scene that was so important, your whole career-making scene? That sucks. It’s horrible. You kind of overacted. It’s not your fault. It was the direction. But it’s just so on the nose, and it’s just cringe-worthy. Do you want the good news?' I said, 'Yeah.' He said, 'Okay, I’m going to rewrite it. I’m going to direct it. I’m going to save this. It’s going to be right. Don’t worry.' We filmed 12 to 20 hours to begin with, which is so much longer than other shows. Other shows filmed 12 hours a day for eight days, and they’re going to get an episode out of that. Then, after we finished those eight days and the main unit started a new episode, we were doing pickups and extra shots on B and splinter units throughout the next week, which was not even entirely legal. But to go back and wholesale throw away an entire day’s work and begin from scratch in the midst of all that other filming was just a huge, huge thing to do. He was willing to do that."

The opening scene, with the running girl and her brightly dyed red hair, has been called by many reviewers an homage to Franka Potente's Lola in Run Lola Run.

== Themes ==
Dan Owen observes that the episode "was very much concerned with the issues of abusive relationships and the Sluggoth symbolised how evil can sometimes be very close, unseen, ready to devour you. ... It feels like ground that Angel's only occasionally touched on, in flashbacks, whereas here it's more central and raw."

== Reception ==
Noel Murray of The A.V. Club gave the episode a grade of B, writing, "I didn't find "Beneath You" as easily likable as "Lessons", though it had some nice moments of levity, and a good bit of derring-do when Buffy swings in on a rope and saves Nancy from Sluggoth Ronny in a back alley. The worm-scenes would've been better if the special effects weren't so cruddy — honestly, the creature almost looks like a cut-and-paste from an old monster movie — but I dug the idea of extending the theme of evil rising by making it literal. (And the fact that the evil is actually some dude, not a demon per se, is another nice touch.)" Mikelangelo Marinaro of Critically Touched also rated the episode a B: "Here lies an episode that ultimately works because of how generously it spreads around its solid character work and follows-through from last season," adding that the final scene "is creepy, slightly amusing, and utterly heart-breaking." Mark Oshiro, focusing on the Anya, Willow and Spike plot-lines, thought that "this episode was probably necessary in terms of the season's arc, but it does feel like a single puzzle piece. It didn't feel like a story in and of itself."
