= Paige Moss =

American actress

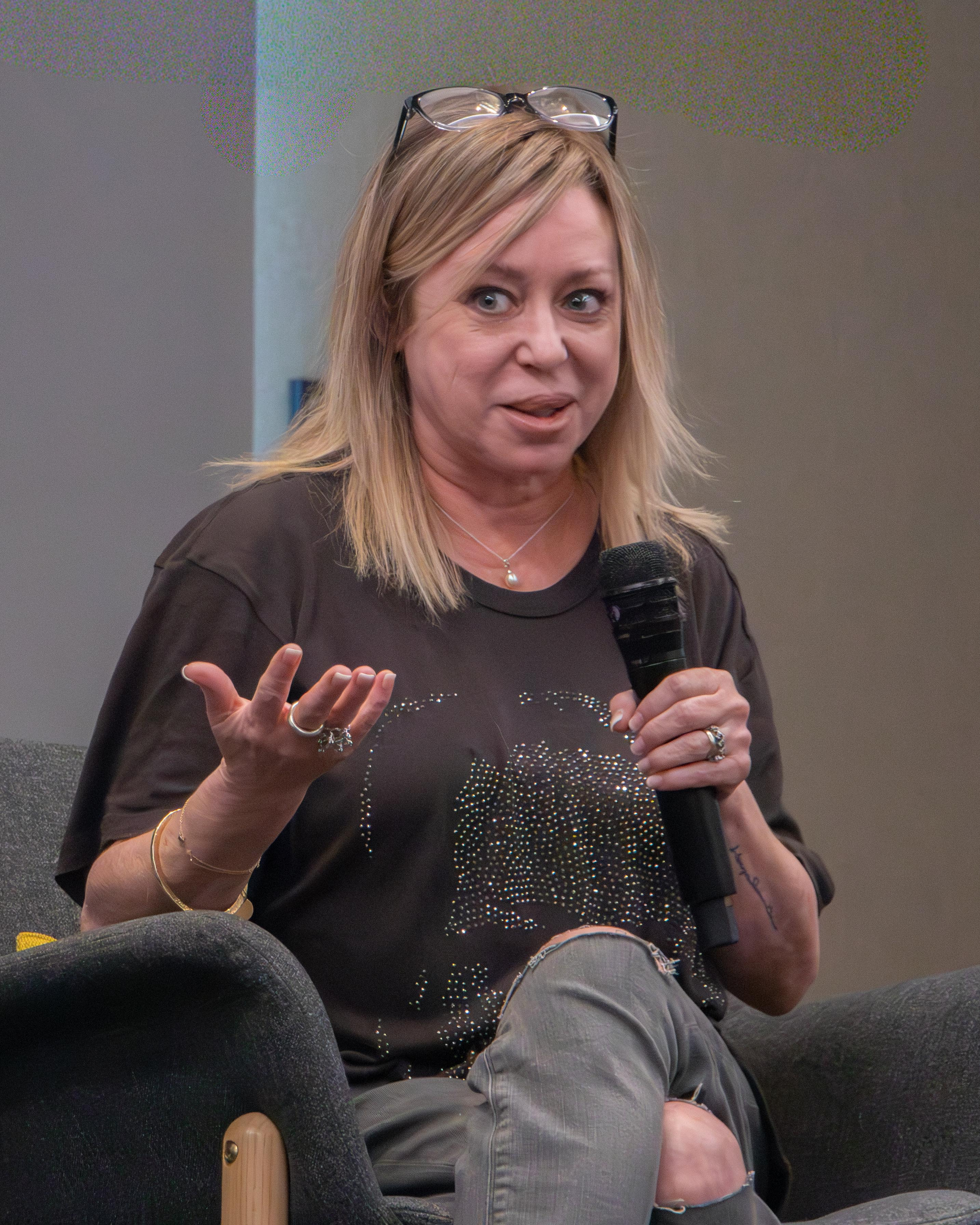
- Paige Moss at the Whispers From The Hellmouth Convention, organized by Geek'N Cheese Conventions, April 2024 (Paris).
- Born: January 30, 1973 (age 53); Washington, District of Columbia, U.S.
- Occupation: Actress
- Years active: 1995–2008
- Spouse: Rick Cameron
- Children: 1 Daughter

Paige Moss (born January 30, 1973) is an American stage, film and television actress.

== Background ==
Moss was born in Washington, District of Columbia and raised in Abilene, Texas. While in high school, Moss was a Senate page for Senator Tim Wirth, and interned for Congressman Vic Fazio.

Moss also auditioned for the summer drama program at the Kennedy Center in Washington, D.C. She returned to her home in Abilene to complete her senior year of high school, but instead opted to get her GED in order to enter college early. At George Mason University in Virginia she majored in theater, but transferred to the American Academy of Dramatic Arts in Los Angeles, California.

== Career ==
Moss has had numerous roles in film and on television since 1995, and is best known for her portrayal of Tara Marks, the crazy girl who tried to kill Kelly Taylor on Beverly Hills, 90210 in its 1996 season, and for her performance as the werewolf Veruca in three episodes of the cult TV series Buffy the Vampire Slayer in 1999. Creator and show runner Joss Whedon originally intended for Oz, Willow and Veruca to be involved in a love triangle spanning most of the fourth season. However, Seth Green's abrupt decision to leave the show ultimately prevented these plans. She is also known for her work as Maddy O'Neil in 20 episodes of the ABC show It's All Relative from 2002 through 2004, and for voice roles in the animated series American Dragon: Jake Long (2007) and Random! Cartoons (2008).

== Filmography ==
=== Film ===
Year	Title	Role	Notes
1998	Girl	Barn Girl #2	
1998	Can't Hardly Wait	Ashley	
1999	Total Stranger	Jill Young	
2000	Auggie Rose	Noreen	
2001	Killer Instinct	Wendy	
2001	Cousin of Sleep		Short
2001	Shooting LA	The Girl	
2002	My Father's House	Jenna Sumner	
2004	Recycling Flo	Fran	Short
2005	Short Fuse	Sofia	

=== Television ===
Year	Title	Role	Notes
1995–96	Baywatch Nights	Hayley Cartwright, Nurse	Episodes: "Silent Witness", "The Strike"
1996	Beverly Hills, 90210	Tara Marks	Recurring role (season 6)
1996	No One Would Tell	Donna Fowler	TV film
1997	Murder Live!	Sally McGrath	TV film
1997	Prison of Secrets	Betsy	TV film
1997	Seinfeld	Girl	Episode: "The Muffin Tops"
1997	Chicago Hope	Ruby Madigan	Episode: "... And the Hand Played On"
1997	House of Frankenstein	Olivia	TV miniseries
1998	Diagnosis: Murder	Kelly Denero	Episode: "An Education in Murder"
1999	Touched by an Angel	Sarah Joan Parker	Episode: "Fool for Love"
1999	ER	Amy Stehly	Episode: "Last Rites"
1999	Hercules: The Legendary Journeys	Antigone	Episode: "Rebel With a Cause"
1999	Buffy the Vampire Slayer	Veruca	Episodes: "Living Conditions", "Beer Bad", "Wild at Heart"
1999	Student Affairs	Nina	TV film
2000	JAG	Andrea Granato	Episode: "Promises"
2001	FreakyLinks	Claudia 'Sweetie' Vance	Episode: "Subject: Live Fast, Die Young"
2002	The Court		Episode: "Stay"
2002	The Division	Alcoholic Woman	Episode: "Farewell My Lovelies"
2003–04	It's All Relative	Maddy O'Neil	Main role
2004	The Ranch	Rickie Lee	TV film
2004	Strong Medicine	Anna	Episode: "Selective Breeding"
2007	American Dragon: Jake Long	Marnie Lockjelly (voice)	Episode: "Bite Father, Bite Son"
2008	Random! Cartoons	Princess Bubblegum (voice)	Episode: "Adventure Time"
