= Buffy the Vampire Slayer season 4 =

Season of television series

Buffy the Vampire Slayer
- Season 4
- Region 1 Season 4 DVD cover
- Showrunner: Joss Whedon
- Starring: Sarah Michelle Gellar; Nicholas Brendon; Alyson Hannigan; Seth Green; Marc Blucas; James Marsters; Anthony Stewart Head
- No. of episodes: 22

Release
- Original network: The WB
- Original release: October 5, 1999 – May 23, 2000

Season chronology
- ← Previous; Season 3 Next → Season 5

The fourth season of the television series Buffy the Vampire Slayer premiered on October 5, 1999, on The WB and concluded its 22-episode season on May 23, 2000. It maintained its previous timeslot, airing Tuesdays at 8:00 pm ET. Beginning with this season, the character of Angel was given his own series, which aired on The WB following Buffy. Various Buffy characters made appearances in Angel, including Buffy herself; Cordelia Chase, formerly a regular in Buffy, and Wesley Wyndam-Pryce, who appeared in Buffy season three.

== Plot ==
Season four sees Buffy and Willow enroll at UC Sunnydale while Xander joins the workforce. The vampire Spike, having been left by Drusilla, returns to Sunnydale and is abducted by the Initiative, a top-secret military installation based beneath the UC Sunnydale campus, led by Maggie Walsh. They implant a microchip in his head which prevents him from harming humans. He reluctantly helps the Scooby Gang throughout the season and even begins to fight on their side after joyfully learning that he can harm fellow demons. Buffy and her friends still don't trust him, except Willow who opts to give him a chance to redeem himself, which he eventually does.

Oz leaves town after realizing that he is too dangerous as a werewolf and after an horrific encounter with the Initiative. Willow falls in love with Tara Maclay, another witch, and the two begin a relationship.

Another focus of the season is Xander's relationship with former vengeance demon Anya Jenkins, who becomes infatuated with him due to him making her feel human and Xander returns these feelings as she makes him feel like a man. Anya tries to get Xander off her mind, but feelings develop which they finally acknowledge and begin a relationship.

Buffy begins dating Riley Finn, a grad student who she later discovers is a member of the Initiative. Riley tries to involve Buffy in the organization, initially it seems successful, with Initiative leader Professor Walsh impressed with Buffy's incredible fighting skills, and allowing her a security pass and pager, but Buffy's questions and non-military free spirit worry Walsh who sees it as a threat to her plans and potential bad influence on Riley, threatening his allegiance to the Initiative. After Buffy and Riley's first sexual encounter, seen by Walsh via a hidden camera, Professor Walsh plots to kill Buffy, which fails but causes Riley to cut ties with Professor Walsh and the Initiative.

The Initiative's more sinister secret purpose is revealed when its composite bio-mechanical demonoid, Adam, kills Walsh, then escapes and rampages through the town. After getting Spike to temporarily work for him, Adam plots to create others like him to overthrow humanity, although Adam sees Riley as his "brother".

Faith awakens from a coma, seeking revenge, and receives a gift from Mayor Wilkins that enables her to switch bodies with Buffy; but she is defeated again, and flees to Los Angeles.

Buffy and her allies unite to defeat Adam and destroy the Initiative. The demons and other supernatural creatures fight back against their former captors, while the Scoobies temporarily transfer all their skills into Buffy to fight the physically superior Adam. Magically enhanced, she kills Adam by ripping out his uranium core. The Initiative is defeated and the Scoobies recover. The government recognizes that Professor Maggie Walsh's plan is a failure, and orders her project to be terminated. The Scoobies later encounter the spirit of The First Slayer, who gives Buffy a cryptic message.

== Cast and characters ==
=== Main cast ===
- Sarah Michelle Gellar as Buffy Summers
- Nicholas Brendon as Xander Harris
- Alyson Hannigan as Willow Rosenberg
- Seth Green as Daniel "Oz" Osbourne
- Marc Blucas as Riley Finn
- James Marsters as Spike
- Anthony Stewart Head as Rupert Giles

=== Recurring cast ===
- Emma Caulfield as Anya Jenkins
- Amber Benson as Tara Maclay
- Leonard Roberts as Forrest Gates
- Bailey Chase as Graham Miller
- Lindsay Crouse as Maggie Walsh
- George Hertzberg as Adam
- Adam Kaufman as Parker Abrams
- Kristine Sutherland as Joyce Summers
- Mercedes McNab as Harmony Kendall
- Paige Moss as Veruca
- Conor O'Farrell as Colonel McNamara
- Phina Oruche as Olivia
- Jack Stehlin as Dr. Angleman
- David Boreanaz as Angel
- Eliza Dushku as Faith
- Dagney Kerr as Kathy Newman

=== Guest cast ===
- Elizabeth Anne Allen as Amy Madison
- Ethan Erickson as Percy West
- Sharon Ferguson as The First Slayer
- Harry Groener as Mayor Richard Wilkins III
- Saverio Guerra as Willy the Snitch
- Jason Hall as Devon MacLeish
- Robin Sachs as Ethan Rayne
- Armin Shimerman as Principal Snyder
- Danny Strong as Jonathan Levinson
- Andy Umberger as D'Hoffryn
- Pedro Pascal as Eddie (Credited as Pedro Balmaceda)
- Rob Benedict as Jape

== Crew ==
Series creator Joss Whedon served as executive producer and showrunner, and wrote and directed four episodes including the season premiere and finale. Marti Noxon was promoted to supervising producer and wrote or co-wrote five episodes. Jane Espenson was promoted to co-producer and wrote or co-wrote five episodes. David Fury, who as a freelancer had written or co-written three episodes in seasons 2 and 3, was hired as producer and wrote or co-wrote four episodes. Douglas Petrie was promoted to executive story editor and wrote three episodes. The only new addition was Tracey Forbes, who served as a staff writer and wrote three episodes.

James A. Contner (also co-producer) directed the highest number of episodes in the fourth season, directing six episodes. Joss Whedon and David Grossman each directed four.

== Episodes ==
No. overall	No. in season	Title	Directed by	Written by	Original release date	Prod. code	U.S. viewers (millions)
57	1	"The Freshman"	Joss Whedon	Joss Whedon	October 5, 1999	4ABB01	6.79
Buffy and Willow arrive at UC Sunnydale. Buffy struggles to settle in, having an awkward encounter with fellow student Riley Finn, finding her new roommate Kathy hard to live with, and being humiliated when a professor ejects her from class. That night, Buffy meets fellow freshman Eddie, and they soon get along. After Buffy leaves, Eddie is attacked by a gang of vampires, led by Sunday. Missing Eddie at class the next day, Buffy asks Giles for advice. Giles suggests that Buffy is capable of handling the situation herself. The following night, Buffy finds Eddie, now a vampire, and is forced to kill him. Sunday's gang surround and overpower Buffy, although she escapes. Shaken, she flees to her mother Joyce's house, where the phone rings. When Buffy answers, the caller (Note: Angel, as shown in the Angel episode "City Of".) hangs up without speaking. She then goes to the Bronze, where she is startled to see someone who resembles Angel. (Note: Played by David Boreanaz in a cameo appearance.) She runs into Xander, who lifts Buffy's spirits. They track down the vampires. Buffy falls into their room. Sunday again overpowers Buffy, until Sunday breaks Buffy's "Class Protector" trophy. (Note: Awarded to Buffy by classmates in the season 3 episode "The Prom".) Now riled up and joined by Xander, Oz, and Willow, Buffy turns the tables, killing Sunday. Giles offers to continue to help Buffy in future. A lone surviving vampire is tasered by masked figures.
58	2	"Living Conditions"	David Grossman	Marti Noxon	October 12, 1999	4ABB02	5.64
Buffy finds life with roommate Kathy increasingly difficult. On a night patrol, Kathy joins Buffy unexpectedly. Buffy pushes Kathy into a bush to prevent her from seeing a Mok'tagar demon, which Buffy then fights off. Two other Mok'tagar demons watch on. The following night, Buffy dreams of a Mok'tagar demon performing a ritual on her, later learning that Kathy had the same dream. Buffy's friends grow increasingly concerned about Buffy's behavior and hatred towards Kathy. After Buffy gathers toenail clippings and explains that she thinks Kathy is a Mok'tagar demon, Willow asks her to go to Giles' house, where Giles, Oz and Xander prepared a trap to capture her by making a net fall her on from the ceiling as soon as she enter the room. They also try to tie her up with ropes while she is trapped by the net but Buffy soon breaks free and returns to her dorm room, where she and Kathy fight. Buffy inadvertently tears Kathy's face off, revealing a demon underneath. Meanwhile, Giles realizes that Buffy was right about Kathy being a Mok'tagar demon, and learns that Kathy has stolen parts of Buffy's soul. He performs the ritual to restore it, thwarting Kathy's efforts just as the Mok'tagar demons, who are from Kathy's clan and who she was trying to evade to continue enjoying living as a free human college student, arrive and pull Kathy back to their own dimension. Willow moves in as Buffy's roommate.
59	3	"The Harsh Light of Day"	James A. Contner	Jane Espenson	October 19, 1999	4ABB03	5.09
Buffy spends time with Parker, a student she met recently, and Parker asks Buffy out. Harmony Kendall, a former Sunnydale High student, now a vampire, (Note: Following the events of the Season 3 finale "Graduation Day".) attacks Willow. Oz chases her off. Anya visits Xander, asking about the nature of their relationship. Xander encourages her to slow down, although in a later visit Anya strips off soon after arriving, and they have sex. Afterwards, Anya tells Xander she is over him, but storms off when Xander reacts indifferently. Buffy runs into Harmony and her new boyfriend Spike. Buffy and Parker enjoy a date, and they sleep together. Parker promises to call later, but never does. Harmony finds the Gem of Amara in a crypt. Spike takes the Gem from Harmony and abandons her. Buffy sees Parker out with another woman, and realizes that Parker had no interest in a relationship with her. Spike attacks Buffy in broad daylight, impervious to the sun thanks to the Gem. After a long fight, Buffy eventually takes the Gem from Spike, who is forced to retreat. Oz offers to take the ring to Angel in L.A. The closing scene is Harmony, Anya, and Buffy separately wandering the campus at night, near to each other but very alone in their heartbreak.
60	4	"Fear, Itself"	Tucker Gates	David Fury	October 26, 1999	4ABB04	5.98
The gang are carving Halloween pumpkins, but worry about Buffy who is too depressed to join in. Buffy goes to Giles' house to discuss patrolling that evening, but is dismayed to find him in costume, with a giant sombrero, and giddily enjoying the spooky season. Reluctantly Buffy agrees to join her friends in dressing up for Halloween, but the gang find themselves in a real-life house of horrors at the student party, after the hosts accidentally invoke a fear demon which feeds on their individual fears. Arriving late, Anya is unable to enter the house and realizing something is amiss enlists Giles's help to save Xander. Buffy decides to destroy the incantation symbol before Giles is able to explain that doing so will actually summon the terrifying demon named Gachnar, with an unexpectedly hilarious result.
61	5	"Beer Bad"	David Solomon	Tracey Forbes	November 2, 1999	4ABB05	5.11
Buffy day-dreams of saving Parker's life with her slaying skills, and him begging forgiveness for the way he treated her. Xander gets a job bartending at the college Pub, enduring a clique of snobby and mean clientele. Buffy ends up drowning her sorrows, drinking with the elitist college boys who like her, but they all begin to act oddly. Xander works out that the bar-manager, seeking revenge after years of bad-mannered arrogance from some of the student patrons, has been spiking their foamy beer with some supernatural mojo, causing the recipients to revert to caveman / woman mentality. Buffy's Parker dream comes true.
62	6	"Wild at Heart"	David Grossman	Marti Noxon	November 9, 1999	4ABB06	6.51
Oz encounters another werewolf, Veruca (Paige Moss), who wants him to stop caging himself and hurt people. Physically attracted to her, Oz locks her in his cage to prevent her from attacking people. Willow finds them in the morning both naked. Heartbroken, she begins a revenge spell but can't go through with it, leaving her vulnerable to wolf Veruca. Oz and Buffy save the day, but Oz determines to leave town for the safety of Willow and others.
63	7	"The Initiative"	James A. Contner	Douglas Petrie	November 16, 1999	4ABB07	5.65
The commandos are revealed to be a secret military organisation, that Riley and Maggie Walsh are a part of. Spike is being held hostage by them in a hi-tech facility underneath the University. Spike escapes and heads to find Buffy, who he assumes is behind this; Riley realizes he has a crush on Buffy.
64	8	"Pangs"	Michael Lange	Jane Espenson	November 23, 1999	4ABB08	5.90
Xander accidentally releases Hus (Tod Thawley), a Chumash Native American vengeance warrior spirit. Angel secretly arrives in Sunnydale to protect Buffy (who is attempting a perfect Thanksgiving) from the spirit. Spike seeks the Scoobies' help.
65	9	"Something Blue"	Nick Marck	Tracey Forbes	November 30, 1999	4ABB09	5.42
A spell by Willow goes awry, blinding Giles, making Xander a literal demon-magnet, and causing Buffy and Spike to fall in love and get engaged, much to Giles' and the rest of the gang's bemusement. Once Willow realizes her mistake, she sets about reversing it.
66	10	"Hush"	Joss Whedon	Joss Whedon	December 14, 1999	4ABB10	5.97
The Gentlemen steal the voices of the population of Sunnydale, rendering everyone in the town (including the Scooby Gang) unable to speak. Giles studies his books then gives a slide-show on his findings to the Scoobies, with his hand-drawn illustrations. The Scoobies communicate with pens, wipe-boards and amusingly misinterpreted mimes. Giles reveals that the only thing to defeat The Gentleman is a real human scream. Buffy and Riley both go to confront The Gentlemen, finding they have something unexpected in common. This episode is mostly silent (aside from music and ambient sound) from the point The Gentlemen steal Sunnydale's voices.
67	11	"Doomed"	James A. Contner	Marti Noxon & David Fury & Jane Espenson	January 18, 2000	4ABB11	5.35
An earthquake occurs in Sunnydale, which signifies the Hellmouth is opening. The gang must return to the remains of Sunnydale High to stop it; Buffy and Riley struggle with adjusting to each other's secrets.
68	12	"A New Man"	Michael Gershman	Jane Espenson	January 25, 2000	4ABB12	6.02
Giles, feeling left out, goes out for drinks with Ethan Rayne (Robin Sachs). He wakes up in the morning as a Fyarl demon, and hires Spike to try help him, with a brief car-stop to comically chase his Campus foe, Professor Walsh. Mistaking him for a Fyarl demon, the Initiative and Buffy hunt him down.
69	13	"The I in Team"	James A. Contner	David Fury	February 8, 2000	4ABB13	4.83
When Professor Walsh (Lindsay Crouse) realizes Buffy is a threat to the Initiative, she decides to kill her by sending her on a dangerous mission. While Riley is being informed of Buffy's death, he sees her message to Professor Walsh on the surveillance screens. On learning that Walsh has tried to kill Buffy, Riley begins to think seriously of leaving the organization.
70	14	"Goodbye Iowa"	David Solomon	Marti Noxon	February 15, 2000	4ABB14	4.85
Buffy discovers the Initiative's secret weapon; Riley becomes unstable due to the death of Professor Walsh and drug withdrawal; Adam (George Hertzberg) reveals some information about himself, while trying to learn about people by investigating their insides.
71	15	"This Year's Girl"	Michael Gershman	Douglas Petrie	February 22, 2000	4ABB15	5.75
Faith (Eliza Dushku) wakes up from her eight-month coma and seeks revenge against Buffy. After failing to attack her, she switches bodies with Buffy using a magical gift, Draconian Katra, left to her by Richard Wilkins III (Harry Groener), the now-dead mayor.
72	16	"Who Are You?"	Joss Whedon	Joss Whedon	February 29, 2000	4ABB16	4.90
Buffy (in Faith's body) is abducted by the Council's team, while Faith (in Buffy's body) has ruthless fun at the expense of Buffy. After Faith and Buffy (as each other) rescue a group of people in a church that has been attacked by vampires, they switch their bodies back. Faith begins to feel remorse, and heads to L.A.
73	17	"Superstar"	David Grossman	Jane Espenson	April 4, 2000	4ABB17	4.11
Jonathan (Danny Strong) casts a spell to cause all of Sunnydale to believe that he is the titular "superstar". However, the spell comes with a price - it conjures up a monster which endangers the town.
74	18	"Where the Wild Things Are"	David Solomon	Tracey Forbes	April 25, 2000	4ABB18	3.85
When Buffy and Riley rouse a supernatural force at the fraternity party house, they are held hostage by ghost children who were abused by a Christian fundamentalist (Kathryn Joosten) and now seek revenge. Willow, Tara, and Giles perform a spell to stop the spirits.
75	19	"New Moon Rising"	James A. Contner	Marti Noxon	May 2, 2000	4ABB19	4.02
Oz returns to Sunnydale after learning to control his werewolf instincts. However, he loses control when he suspects Tara (Amber Benson) and Willow's relationship, and is subsequently caught by the Initiative.
76	20	"The Yoko Factor"	David Grossman	Douglas Petrie	May 9, 2000	4ABB20	4.55
Riley spars with Angel (David Boreanaz) when Angel visits Sunnydale; Adam convinces Spike that he will take his chip out if he helps him get Buffy where he wants, Spike agrees and sets out to distance the Scoobies from each other.
77	21	"Primeval"	James A. Contner	David Fury	May 16, 2000	4ABB21	4.85
The Scoobies uncover Adam's plan of releasing an army of hybrid cyborg monsters. Willow's enjoining spell temporarily blends herself, Buffy, Giles and Xander into a being with the powers and knowledge needed to destroy Adam after an intense fight.
78	22	"Restless"	Joss Whedon	Joss Whedon	May 23, 2000	4ABB22	4.50
As a result of the magic done in the previous episode, a primordial spirit haunts Buffy, Giles, Willow, and Xander in their individual, cryptic nightmares involving the First Slayer named Sineya (Sharon Ferguson).

=== Crossovers with Angel ===
Beginning with this season, Buffy the Vampire Slayer and its spin-off Angel both aired on The WB Television Network. Both shows aired on Tuesdays, Buffy at 8:00 PM ET, and Angel at 9:00 PM ET. The fourth season of Buffy aired along with the first season of Angel. Both shows featured crossover episodes, in which characters of one series appeared in the other. Angel (David Boreanaz), Cordelia Chase (Charisma Carpenter) and Wesley Wyndam-Pryce (Alexis Denisof), who had been introduced in Buffy, became main characters in the spinoff series.

The first crossover appeared in the premiere episodes, where Angel calls Buffy but doesn't say anything; on Buffy, she is seen answering the phone. After the events of "The Harsh Light of Day", Oz (Seth Green) visits Los Angeles in the Angel episode "In the Dark" to give Angel the Gem of Amara (a ring that makes vampires unkillable), and Spike (James Marsters) follows him.

In the Angel episode "The Bachelor Party", Doyle (Glenn Quinn) has a vision of Buffy in danger. This causes Angel to secretly visit Sunnydale in the episode "Pangs", to protect her. After learning that he was in town, Buffy (Sarah Michelle Gellar) visits L.A. in the Angel episode "I Will Remember You" to express her displeasure in his not telling her that he was there.

Buffy season three recurring character Wesley Wyndam-Pryce (Alexis Denisof) makes his first appearance on Angel in "Parting Gifts", becoming a series regular for the remainder of the series.

After the events of the two-part episode "This Year's Girl" and "Who Are You?", Faith (Eliza Dushku) leaves Sunnydale and goes to L.A. in the Angel two-part episode "Five by Five" and "Sanctuary" and is hired by Wolfram & Hart to kill Angel. Buffy makes her second and final appearance on Angel in "Sanctuary".

Angel visits Sunnydale again in "The Yoko Factor" to apologize to Buffy after the way he treated her in "Sanctuary". Angel meets Buffy's new boyfriend, Riley Finn (Marc Blucas).

The vampire Darla (Julie Benz), who was killed in Buffy episode "Angel", is resurrected by Wolfram & Hart in the Angel season one finale, "To Shanshu in L.A.", and subsequently becomes a recurring character there.

== Reception ==
The fourth season averaged 5.1 million viewers.

The season received three Primetime Emmy Award nominations, for Outstanding Hairstyling for a Series for "Beer Bad", Outstanding Cinematography for a Single Camera Series (Michael Gershman) for "Hush", and Outstanding Writing for a Drama Series (Joss Whedon) for "Hush".

Sarah Michelle Gellar was nominated for a Golden Globe Award for Best Actress – Television Series Drama.

The season was nominated for two Television Critics Association Awards, for Outstanding Achievement in Drama and Program of the Year.

In particular, the episode "Hush" was highly praised when it aired. Robert Bianco from USA Today comments, "(i)n a medium in which producers tend to grow bored with their own creations, either trashing them or taking them in increasingly bizarre directions, Whedon continues to find new ways to make his fabulously entertaining series richer and more compelling. With or without words, he's a TV treasure." Alan Sepinwall in The Star-Ledger calls it a "magnificently daring episode", explaining "(w)hat makes it particularly brave is that, even when Buffy has been failing to click dramatically this year, the show has still been able to get by on the witty dialogue, which is all but absent after the first few scenes. Whedon finds ways to get around that, with several cast members—particularly Anthony Head as the scholarly Giles and Alyson Hannigan as nervous witch Willow—proving to be wonderfully expressive silent comedians." In the New York Daily News, David Bianculli states that the episode is "a true tour de force, and another inventive triumph for this vastly underrated series." Robert Hanks from The Independent in the UK writes that "Buffy the Vampire Slayer, in most weeks the funniest and cleverest programme on TV, reached new heights" with "Hush". Noel Murray in The A.V. Club calls it an "episode unlike any other, with a lusher score and some of the most genuinely disturbing imagery I’ve yet seen on Buffy." The episode was included among 13 of the scariest films or television shows by Salon.com, and justified by Stephanie Zacharek, who states it "scans just like one of those listless dreams in which you try to scream, and can't. Everybody's had 'em—and yet the way the eerie quiet of 'Hush' sucks you in, you feel as if the experience is privately, and unequivocally, your own." Following the series finale in 2003, "Hush" continued to receive praise. Lisa Rosen in the Los Angeles Times states that the episode is "one of TV's most terrifying hours". Smashing Magazine counted "Hush" as one of the top ten television episodes that inspire creativity. Keith McDuffee of TV Squad named it the best Buffy episode in the series, writing "(i)f someone who had never seen Buffy (blasphemy!) asked me to show them just one episode of the show to get them hooked, this would be it". TV.com named it as the fourth most frightening episode in television history.

The Futon Critic named "Restless" the best episode of 2000.

Rotten Tomatoes gave season four a score of 78% with an average rating of 7 out of 10 based on 23 reviews. The site's critics consensus states, "Buffy enters its fourth season on shaky ground but finishes with a surprisingly satisfying season finale."

== Home media ==
Buffy the Vampire Slayer: The Complete Fourth Season was released on DVD in region 1 on June 10, 2003 and in region 2 on May 13, 2002. The DVD includes all 22 episodes on 6 discs presented in full frame 1.33:1 aspect ratio (region 1) and in anamorphic widescreen 1.78:1 aspect ratio (region 2 and 4). Special features on the DVD include seven commentary tracks—"Wild at Heart" by creator Joss Whedon, writer Marti Noxon, and actor Seth Green (region 1 only); "The Initiative" by writer Doug Petrie; "Hush" by writer and director Joss Whedon; "This Year's Girl" by writer Doug Petrie; "Superstar" by writer Jane Espenson; "Primeval" by writer David Fury and director James A. Contner; and "Restless" by writer and director Joss Whedon. Scripts for "Fear, Itself", "Hush", and "Who Are You?" are included. Featurettes include "Spike Me", which details the character of Spike; "Oz Revelations: A Full Moon", which details the departure of the character with insights by actor Seth Green; "Hush", where cast and crew members discuss the unique episode; "Buffy: Inside Sets of Sunnydale" showcases all the sets on the show with tours of sets; "Buffy: Inside the Music", which details the music and bands featured on the show; and "Season 4 Overview", a 35-minute featurette where cast and crew members discuss the season. Also included are cast biographies and photo galleries.
