= As You Were (Buffy the Vampire Slayer) =

- Buffy the Vampire Slayer episode
- Episode no.: Season 6 Episode 15
- Directed by: Doug Petrie
- Written by: Doug Petrie
- Production code: 6ABB15
- Original air date: February 26, 2002

Guest appearances
- Marc Blucas as Riley Finn; Ivana Miličević as Samantha Finn; Ryan Raddatz as Todd; Adam Paul as Skanky Vamp; Marilyn Brett as Lady; Alice Dinnean Vernon as Baby Demon Puppeteer

Episode chronology
| ← Previous "Older and Far Away" | Next → "Hell's Bells" |
- Buffy the Vampire Slayer season 6

"As You Were" is the fifteenth episode of season 6 of the television show Buffy the Vampire Slayer. The episode aired on February 26, 2002 on UPN. The storyline concerns Riley's return to Sunnydale with his wife Sam and their search for a creature called a Suvolte Demon. Reviewers commended the episode for its emotional impact and character development.

== Plot ==
Buffy and Riley fight a Suvolte demon on the streets of Sunnydale, but it escapes and they pursue him to a dam in his car. Riley's wife, Sam, arrives and jumps into the fight. Buffy recovers from the shock of Riley being married and Riley tells her about his life since he left. Buffy snaps the demon's neck, shocking Sam and Riley, who had hoped to take it alive.

At the house, Sam explains that the Suvolte demon has come to the Hellmouth to lay a nest full of its offspring. A demonic dealer in Sunnydale by the name of "The Doctor" is suspected of holding the eggs for a fee.

Buffy questions Spike about "The Doctor", but he has no immediate answers. After the two have sex, Riley walks in on them and accuses Spike of being The Doctor. Riley finds the Suvolte eggs on the floor of Spike's crypt. Spike explains that he is holding them for a friend. When they hatch, Buffy destroys them using Riley's grenades. Buffy admits to Riley that she and Spike are involved and that she hates her life. She apologizes to Riley for hiding her feelings before he left; he forgives her. The next day, Buffy finds Spike at his crypt and ends their relationship, telling him that she cannot love him nor can she keep using him to avoid her problems as it is killing her to do so.

== Critical reaction ==
The A.V. Club called this "one of the most entertaining—and unexpectedly emotional—Buffy episodes in a good long while," noting that Riley appears "as a stark reminder of what Buffy's missing in her life at this moment, and as a catalyst for change." TheTVCritic.org noted that it succeeded to hit the emotional points it was aiming for, and particularly praised Riley's speech about how great Buffy is.

The website Critically Touched awards a rating of 73 out of 100 (C+), arguing that the episode is "unbelievably hokey and silly" because of the "apparent marriage/military bliss" of Riley and Sam, but concludes that "this is an episode that has a few irritating missteps, but, despite itself, manages to pull itself into a really worthwhile episode containing some fabulous, character-altering moments. This entire season has struggled with its plots, but the character material still shines through brightly."

Critically Touched and the website The Buffy Phenomenon see this episode as a turning point in Buffy's life:

[w]e see a Buffy who has sadly turned into the very thing she found so strange about the Doublemeat Palace at first: the near-emotionless worker who stares blankly around and does her job on autopilot. What does Riley provide? He provides a sense of urgent necessity and a reason to jump into action. When Buffy spends a moment to consider whether to help Riley or not, I think it causes some immediate self-reflection. Buffy's been called into action again and it allows her, for the first time since her resurrection, to feel like herself again -- like she has a purpose; like the person she used to be. This is what the title of episode is in reference to.
