= Something Blue (Buffy the Vampire Slayer) =

- Buffy the Vampire Slayer episode
- Episode no.: Season 4 Episode 9
- Directed by: Nick Marck
- Written by: Tracey Forbes
- Production code: 4ABB09
- Original air date: November 30, 1999

Guest appearances
- Marc Blucas as Riley Finn; Emma Caulfield as Anya; Elizabeth Anne Allen as Amy Madison; Andy Umberger as D'Hoffryn

Episode chronology
← Previous "Pangs"	Next → "Hush"
- Buffy the Vampire Slayer season 4

"Something Blue" is the 9th episode of season 4 of the television show Buffy the Vampire Slayer. Written by Tracey Forbes and directed by Nick Marck, it originally aired on November 30, 1999 on The WB. In "Something Blue", a spell by Willow goes awry, blinding Giles, making Xander a literal demon magnet, and causing Buffy and Spike to fall in love and get engaged.

== Plot ==
Riley invites Buffy out on a picnic. Willow and Buffy discuss the consequences of a possible relationship with Riley, who seems "safe" and unlikely to hurt her. Buffy wonders if true passion requires pain and fighting. Later, Buffy interrogates Spike, who is chained up in Giles' bathtub, but he does not give much information. Willow suggests a truth spell to make Spike talk.

Going to Oz's place, Willow finds it emptied and realizes he has had his possessions forwarded to him without getting in touch with her, crushing her last hopes of his return. That night at The Bronze, she opts to drown her sorrows in alcohol. Later, in the dorm bathroom, Willow performs a spell to let her will be granted in order to make her pain go away. However, her commands do not seem to work. When Giles drops by and asks why she did not show to help him perform the truth spell as scheduled, she admits feeling pressured to live up to high standards so soon after her break-up with Oz. Angry, she says that he cannot see anything, and then Giles leaves in a daze. Giles tries to perform the spell on Spike alone, but has difficulty reading. After Giles accidentally drops the key to the chains keeping Spike captive, Spike is able to escape. After Giles calls, Buffy goes to find Spike and once she catches him after Willow makes a sarcastic comment, she brings him back to Giles's apartment.

While talking to Xander, Willow flippantly suggests that Buffy and Spike get married if Spike is so important. Meanwhile at Giles' place, Spike proposes to Buffy and she accepts. Xander continues to try to console Willow, but in an act of misdirected rage and grief, she calls him a "demon magnet". While Buffy and Spike cuddle and kiss and make plans for the wedding, Giles calls Willow for help, confessing that he is totally blind. Buffy runs into Riley outside of a bridal shop and happily tells him about the wedding, which confuses and upsets him. Xander and Anya's romantic time is interrupted by various demons that attack them. They rush to Giles' place where Xander realizes that the cause is Willow and everything she wills is coming true.

D'Hoffryn, the demon responsible for making Anya a vengeance demon, comes forth and takes Willow through a portal to his demon world to make the same offer. When the gang goes to look for her, Anya recognizes the remains of a portal left by D'Hoffryn. Buffy and the rest of the group go to a crypt where they hope to stop D'Hoffryn from turning Willow into a demon. En route to the crypt, several demons attack, still drawn to Xander because of Willow's spell. In the meantime, Willow politely turns down D'Hoffryn's offer and he sends her back; giving her a talisman she can use to summon him in case she ever changes her mind. Willow breaks the spell and tries to make up for her mistake with cookies.

The next day, Buffy finds Riley and manages to convince him she was only joking about getting married; making fun of his panic at finding her gazing into a wedding dress store.

== Continuity ==
Buffy's crinkly, crimped hair signals that the episode contains characters who are different than usual, a little "off" or under a spell. See, for example, "The Zeppo," "This Year's Girl," "Who Are You?," "Superstar," and "Where the Wild Things Are." The episode is also another occurrence of Willow using magic to solve a problem, refusing to go through the normal difficulty and process of her post-breakup pain; an allusion to her dependence on magic, that will become a major story arc in later seasons. Amy Madison, who has been living as a rat since season 3, is briefly transformed back into her human form by Willow (without her noticing); Willow will be able to transform her back into a human in season 6.

== Critical response ==
Vox, ranking it at #19 of all 144 episodes on their "Worst to Best" list, writes, "The hilarious 'Something Blue' takes Willow's misery over Oz leaving and turns it into some bonkers 'what if?' wish fulfillment. Willow's attempts to heal her broken heart with magic go horribly awry when her spell instead compels everyone to take her literally, making Xander an actual demon magnet and Buffy and Spike a happily engaged couple prone to sloppy public makeouts. But the sneak MVP of this episode (and most, if we're being honest) is Giles, who spends the episode going slowly blind and reaching peak ornery Brit. But everyone in the cast is aces in 'Something Blue,' one of the most purely fun episodes Buffy ever did."

Justine Larbalestier has suggested the episode pokes fun at fans "shipping" Buffy and Spike, that is inventing scenarios and writing fan fiction to allow the two characters, normally foes, to become romantically involved.

The A.V. Club called it "a well-balanced episode", mixing comedy with more serious reflection on the theme of how there's no easy solution to Willow's problems. Nikki Stafford found it funny, particularly Spike's actions, though she found Buffy's reactions less than believable.
