= Riley Finn =

Character in Buffy the Vampire Slayer

- Buffy the Vampire Slayer character
- Marc Blucas as Riley Finn.
- First appearance: "The Freshman" (1999)
- Last appearance: Ordinary People (2017)
- Created by: Joss Whedon
- Portrayed by: Marc Blucas

In-universe information
- Affiliation: The Initiative; Scooby Gang; Twilight Group; US Army
- Classification: Human
- Notable powers: Military training grants him knowledge of strategy, combat techniques, tracking, and handling of weapons.

Riley Finn is a fictional character created by Joss Whedon for the television series Buffy the Vampire Slayer. Portrayed by Marc Blucas, Riley was introduced in the 1999 season 4 premiere episode, "The Freshman", and Blucas was part of the series credited cast for the second part of season 4 and the first part of season 5. Most notably, Riley is one of three long-term romantic interests for series' heroine Buffy Summers (Sarah Michelle Gellar).

Whedon intended Riley to be the antithesis of Buffy's boyfriend of the past three seasons, Angel (David Boreanaz), who now headed his own spin-off show. In stark contrast to broody, often pensive Angel, Riley is optimistic, trustworthy and reliable, and in theory presents Buffy with her first opportunity for a "normal" romantic relationship. However, Riley also leads a double life: he is both teaching assistant at UC Sunnydale and a member of The Initiative, a government-sponsored special operations team which both researches and combats the demons which roam Sunnydale. This allows him to interact with Buffy both in her civilian life and assist her with her duties as a Slayer; while Buffy has supernatural powers associated with her role, Riley must rely instead on his extensive military training.

In the show's fifth season, writers experimented with making Riley a more complex character, and so depicted Riley beginning to "fray around the edges". This storyline culminated in Riley being written out of the series in 2000. In 2002, Blucas returned for a final televised appearance in the show's sixth season, where he is seen to have moved on from Buffy and married. Subsequently, the character appears in Expanded Universe material such as the canonical comic book continuation to the series, Buffy the Vampire Slayer Season Eight (2007–11). In Season Eight, the precise nature of Riley's role in the storyline is unclear for much of the story; writer Jane Espenson, however, wrote a Riley one-shot comic book focusing on Riley and his wife.

== Character history ==
A native of Huxley, Iowa, Riley is Buffy Summers' boyfriend for parts of seasons four and five. He is first introduced as Professor Walsh's TA in a psych class Buffy and Willow are in. Riley realizes his feelings for Buffy after punching Parker Abrahams for an inappropriate comment Parker makes regarding their night together. Even though he leads a double life as part of a secret government organization known as The Initiative, Buffy finds some normalcy in Riley as a regular college guy and someone to whom she could relate. Initially, each keeps the other from knowing their respective secret lives, but the truth comes out during the events in the Emmy-nominated episode "Hush".

Buffy and Riley fight demons together and continue saving each other's lives and the world, although Riley is never quite let into Buffy's inner circle. Initially, Riley automatically assumes that all demons are evil, but discovers that demons are capable of both good and evil just as humans are after assisting in saving Oz from the Initiative complex. Having been torn between the Scooby Gang and the Initiative for some time, Riley decides to leave the Initiative upon discovering the extent of its corruption, and spends the remainder of the season in hiding within the ruins of Sunnydale High.

The Initiative was destroyed at the end of season 4, and Riley is relieved of his military standing. He is left at loose ends, and his behavior becomes reckless. Over time, Riley begins to see himself as below Buffy in strength, and begins to push his body well past its limits. In "Out of My Mind", it is discovered that the drugs that Professor Walsh had secretly fed him are causing Riley's pain receptors to shut down and his heartbeat to spike, and could eventually have killed him. Even with this knowledge, Riley initially refuses to accept medical treatment from the government out of paranoia, though Buffy eventually convinces him to do so. Rendered a normal human by the procedure, Riley's insecurities and feelings of weakness only increase, and he becomes increasingly frustrated with Buffy's seeming inability to open up to and be honest with him.

Seeking thrills, and wondering what Buffy seems to find so appealing about vampires – Buffy having allowed both Angel and Dracula to drink from her – Riley begins to let vampires feed from him, which Buffy discovers in the episode "Into the Woods" when Spike reveals Riley at the vampire's nest. His behavior, as well as Spike's manipulations and a sense that Buffy would never truly love him, lead to their breakup. Riley leaves Sunnydale to join another black ops army unit fighting demons elsewhere.

Riley returns in the season 6 episode "As You Were", in which he shows up unexpectedly with his new wife, fellow demon hunter Sam (Ivana Miličević), tracking a demon about to hatch eggs that could wipe out Sunnydale. When Riley learns that Buffy has been sleeping with Spike, he consoles her on her struggles with her life, and forgives her after she apologizes for what happened between them. The battle done, Riley leaves Sunnydale, never to return again. He is, however, mentioned in the season 7 episode "The Killer in Me" where Buffy attempts to contact him for advice on the malfunctioning chip in Spike's head. Riley then contacts soldiers from the Initiative, who help diagnose Spike's condition and then discuss with Buffy that per Riley's instruction, it is her decision to remove or repair the chip in order to save Spike's life. Buffy has them remove the chip.

In canonical comic book continuation Season Eight issue "Time of Your Life, Part IV", it is revealed that Riley is one of villain Twilight's followers, as he is present in the laboratory with Warren Mears, Amy Madison, and Twilight, and bears his mark. Samantha Finn did not appear in Season Eight. Pretending to be Buffy's "inside man", he arranged for their rendezvous in New York City. Later, seen in "Retreat, Part II", Riley is with Twilight and his other followers as they try and track the Scooby Gang through their use of magic; Riley tries to convince Twilight that the results could be a mistake of the scanning technology. He is also intrigued by Twilight's remark that he "knows" Buffy. During a large battle between the Slayers and Twilight's forces, Buffy recovers an injured Riley, revealing to the other characters that Riley was a double agent for her in an attempt to figure out Twilight's plans and identity.

Riley also appears in the first issue of the follow-up series Season Nine (2011–2013); the structure of "Freefall, Part I" suggests that Riley—like Spike, Xander, Willow and others—could have been Buffy's possible one-night stand after the party she hosts at her apartment in San Francisco. Riley remains married to Sam. With the end of magic, Riley now uses his military resources to watch for ordinary terrorists. It is later revealed in "Apart (of Me)" that Buffy did not have sex with anyone. Riley does not appear for the rest of the season. Concurrent with Buffy the Vampire Slayer Season Ten, in Angel & Faith #4 (2014), Faith attempts to leave San Francisco but is contacted by her boss, the Slayer Kennedy, with a mission to find Riley, who has been reported missing in a South American jungle. In the next arc "Lost & Found" Faith finds both Sam and Riley. Riley is willing to forgive her after she saved his life from the tribal vampires in the jungle and says she should stop focusing on seeking forgiveness to make herself feel better and just be the kind of person who would not do those things anymore. He also suggests she talk over the past with Buffy.

== Writing and acting ==
Marc Blucas was asked how the character was described to him during the audition process, he replied that "They said that Riley is a nice, charming guy, and there's going to be some kind of dichotomy, some kind of double role going on. But that was never really specified." In contrast to both Angel and Spike, Riley held out the possibility of normality in Buffy's life. He is also notable in that he is the only boyfriend of Buffy who was accepted by and developed a friendship with Xander Harris, who usually displayed jealousy of the males in her life.

Whedon defended the character of Riley Finn, "The important thing for us was to find a character that was the anti-Angel and to have Buffy go through something very different, part of which was the question, 'How do I get over Angel?' That was the same thing the audience was going through. We knew it wasn't going to be easy and it was very hard trying to find somebody. But Marc [Blucas] has a quality that I love very much: he has sort of an un-David-like, firm, strong, trustworthy quality. I always think of him as Gary Cooper." During season 5, writer/co-executive producer, Marti Noxon, noted that they were making Riley a more tortured complex character, "He's starting to fray around the edges. That's very compelling to me – that this straight guy is starting to get a little strange."

Actor Christian Kane also auditioned for Riley Finn. Kane went on to play the role of Lindsey McDonald on the spin-off show Angel. Kane says he played his audition for Riley "perhaps a little less than wholesome", which he feels resulted in Joss Whedon later casting him as a darker character.

== Appearances ==
=== Canonical appearances ===
Riley has appeared in:

Buffy the Vampire Slayer
Riley was introduced in the show's fourth season as a recurring character and became a regular in the episode "Doomed" and continued on as a regular until season 5's "Into the Woods", and appeared once afterward. He appeared in 31 episodes. His guest appearances include:

- Season 4: "The Freshman", "Fear, Itself", "Beer Bad", "Wild at Heart", "The Initiative", "Pangs", "Something Blue", "Hush"
- Season 6: "As You Were"

Buffy the Vampire Slayer Season Eight
Riley has also appeared in the canonical comic book continuation. He has appeared in the issues:

- "Time of Your Life, Part IV", "Retreat, Part II", "Turbulence", "Riley: Commitment through Distance, Virtue through Sin"
