= Doug Petrie =

American film director

Douglas Petrie
- Citizenship: American
- Education: College of William & Mary (BA)
- Occupations: Screenwriter, producer, director

Douglas Petrie is an American screenwriter, director, and producer. Best known as a writer, director, and co-executive producer on Buffy the Vampire Slayer. He co-wrote the screenplays for the Fantastic Four film and Harriet the Spy. He has also written for the television shows Angel, The 4400, Tru Calling and American Horror Story: Coven. He served as a co-executive producer and writer for two seasons on CSI: Crime Scene Investigation and as a consulting producer and writer on the second season of Pushing Daisies. He made a cameo on Joss Whedon's web-based film, Dr. Horrible's Sing-Along Blog, as "Professor Normal". He served as co-executive producer on the first season of the Netflix show Daredevil, and took over as showrunner for its second season alongside Marco Ramirez. In April 2016 Petrie and Ramirez were announced as showrunners of The Defenders, a miniseries that crosses over Daredevil, Jessica Jones, Luke Cage, and Iron Fist.

== Early life ==
Petrie earned his Bachelor of Arts in English from William & Mary in 1985.

== Buffy the Vampire Slayer and Angel credits ==
Petrie joined the Buffy writing staff in season three as a story editor. He was promoted to executive story editor in season four, co-producer in season five, supervising producer in season six, and finally co-executive producer midway through season seven.

=== Buffy the Vampire Slayer ===
- "Revelations"
- "Bad Girls"
- "Enemies"
- "The Initiative"
- "This Year's Girl"
- "The Yoko Factor"
- "No Place Like Home"
- "Fool for Love"
- "Checkpoint" (co-written with Jane Espenson)
- "The Weight of the World"
- "Flooded" (also director; co-written with Jane Espenson)
- "As You Were" (also director)
- "Two to Go"
- "Beneath You"
- "Bring on the Night" (co-written with Marti Noxon)
- "Get It Done" (also director)
- "End of Days" (co-written with Jane Espenson)

=== Angel ===
- "In the Dark"
- "The Trial" (teleplay; co-written with Tim Minear from a story by David Greenwalt)

=== Comics ===
- Broken Bottle of Djinn, 1937
- Nikki Goes Down!
- Double Cross
- Bad Dog
- Living Doll
- Ring of Fire

== See also ==
- Mutant Enemy Productions
