= Maggie Walsh =

Fictional character from Buffy the Vampire Slayer

- Buffy the Vampire Slayer character
- First appearance: "The Freshman" (1999)
- Last appearance: "Primeval" (2000)
- Created by: Joss Whedon
- Portrayed by: Lindsay Crouse

In-universe information
- Affiliation: The Initiative; 314 Project
- Classification: Human
- Notable powers: Knowledge of psychology, behavior modification, anatomy, biology, and cybernetics

Professor Maggie Walsh is a fictional character in the television series Buffy the Vampire Slayer. The character is portrayed by Lindsay Crouse.

== History ==
Professor Maggie Walsh is introduced in season 4, as Buffy's psychology professor at the University of California, Sunnydale, but is later revealed as the leader of the government-controlled Initiative, a military project intent on capturing, studying, and modifying the behavior of various demons. Unknown to many in the Initiative, Walsh is also involved in Project 314, a secret program within the Initiative that is creating a hybrid demon-humanoid-mechanoid (demonoid) known as Adam. Various creatures captured by the Initiative were dissected to provide the parts for Adam.

Maggie maintains a close relationship with Riley Finn (Marc Blucas), who is her favorite soldier; she appears to think of him as a son. After Riley learns that Buffy is the Slayer, they inform Walsh of her role. Walsh initially thinks that Buffy can be a useful ally to the Initiative, but soon takes a dislike to her unpredictability and unwelcome curiosity, especially regarding the "314 Project". Cameras installed in Riley's room allow her to spy on Buffy and Riley while they have sex, and later to hear Buffy ask Riley about the 314 Project. Perceiving that Buffy poses a risk to the project, Walsh tries to kill Buffy by sending her on a mission on which she is ambushed by two demons released from the Initiative's holding cells. Buffy defeats the demons and appears on the monitors after Walsh has prematurely announced Buffy's death to Riley, who walks out. Walsh retreats to the labs of Project 314, where she plots how to use Adam to defeat Buffy. However, Adam awakens and impales Walsh, killing her, and escapes from the Initiative.

Walsh appears in the penultimate episode of season 4, "Primeval," as a zombie, working under Adam along with others Adam has killed. Attempting to finish off Project 314, begun by Walsh, Adam has his workers manufacturing more creatures like himself; part demon, human, and machine combined. Adam activates the chip Walsh had inserted into Riley's heart, making him biddable to Adam's command. Zombie Walsh attacks Buffy when she comes to Riley's rescue, but Buffy knocks her down and defeats her, and with some help from the Scooby-Gang of Willow, Xander, and Giles, she defeats Adam as well. The Initiative project is shut down permanently.

== Writing and acting ==
Crouse viewed her character "no nonsense, and she seems to be a real teacher. She's like a President. She really would like to fashion the world in her image. She's not a mean person, she's just a straight-out scientist."

In a gender studies text, Jowett includes a section on the character, and argues the character is "masculinized by her roles as professor, scientist and leader."

Crouse has explained how her character was initially explained to her, "Joss tried to explain to me who this character was. He said that she was a scientist, and that she was going to be doing research and eventually, she might hatch an evil plot, but her front was being a psychology teacher."

Crouse gave some insight into her view on her character, "She's such an extremist. She has a vision of what she wants to do. She feels like she's testing the boundaries of something, and any human being always feels important no matter who they are. I'm sure she admires Dr. Frankenstein - or Einstein. She's probably a mix of those two. I like her caustic nature, because she's not a mean person. I have always imagined that Maggie treats people like grown-ups. That she doesn't want to live in a world of babies. She doesn't have the time for it. The Initiative is her baby."

Crouse outlined her view of Maggie's relationships with Riley and Buffy, "Her teaching assistant Riley is really the child she never had, and there's probably confusion there that he's a potential something for her that's slightly out of her reach, but she's willing to prevent anyone else from being interested in him. I think she feels she's in direct competition with Buffy. The most complicated situation for her is having Riley fall in love with Buffy. Finding out that Buffy is the Slayer is a kind of a gas, and it's nervous-making and exciting to have good people on her team; she's like a president - she wants a great cabinet underneath her. I think she'd like to fashion the world in her image, but Buffy puts a wrench in the works".

Buffy writer David Fury said in an interview, "I don't think Joss had envisioned Maggie Walsh as being entirely villainous. As opposed to just sort of misguided."

== See also ==
- List of Buffyverse villains and supernatural beings
