= Leonard Roberts =

American actor

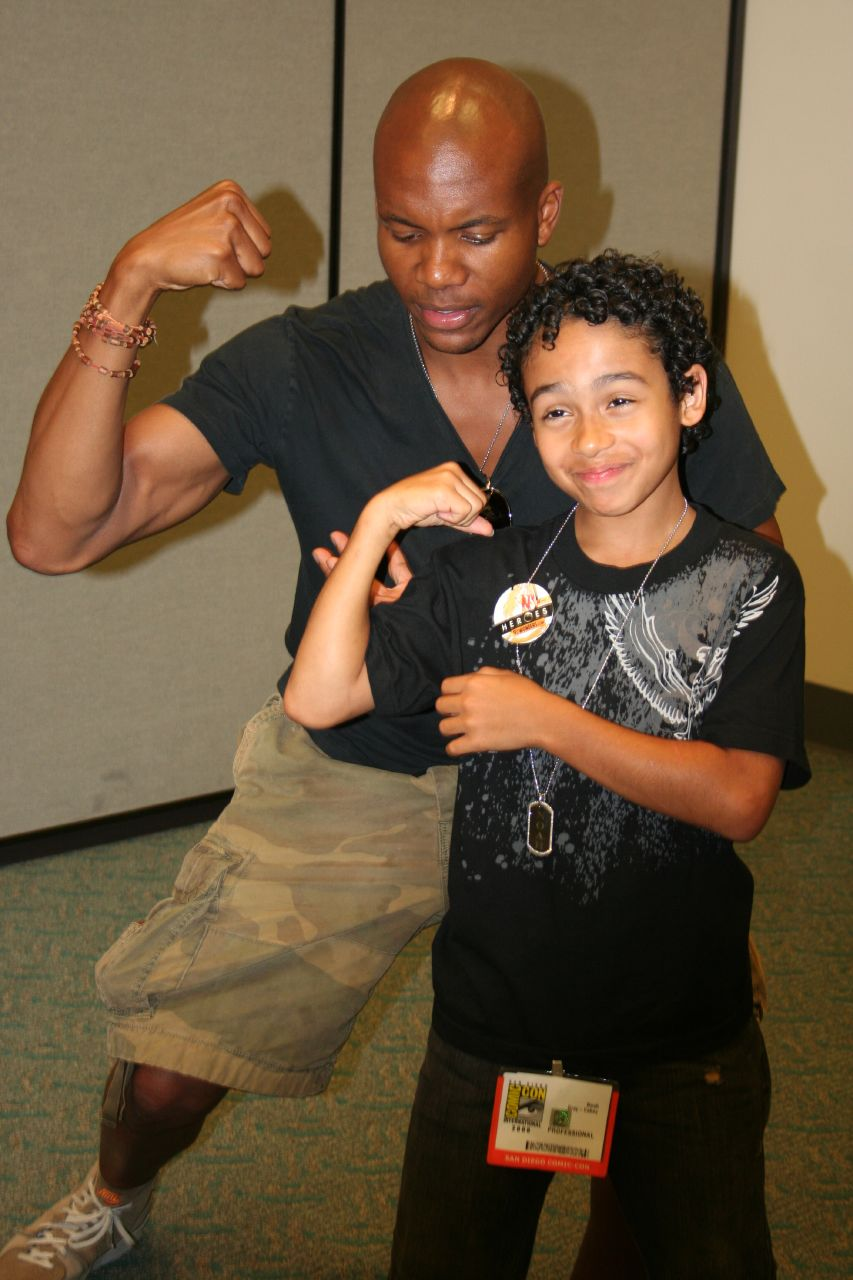
- Leonard Roberts (left) with Heroes co-star Noah Gray-Cabey (right) in 2006
- Born: November 17, 1972 (age 53); St. Louis, Missouri, U.S.
- Education: DePaul University (BFA)
- Occupation: Actor
- Years active: 1996–present

Leonard Roberts (born November 17, 1972) is an American actor. He portrayed Sean Taylor in Drumline, Forrest Gates on the fourth season of Buffy the Vampire Slayer and D. L. Hawkins on Heroes.

== Early life ==
Roberts was born in St. Louis, Missouri. He graduated from University City High School in 1991 and in 1995, Roberts graduated from The Theatre School at DePaul University with a Bachelor of Fine Arts in acting.

== Career ==
Roberts has played the roles of Sean Taylor in Drumline, Forrest Gates in the fourth season of Buffy the Vampire Slayer, D. L. Hawkins on the NBC science-fiction drama Heroes. and Nam-Ek in Smallville. Roberts is credited with the role of Leo in the 2011 film, Pizza Man. He played a small role in season 1 of NCIS as a member of a navy base.

On December 17, 2020, Roberts wrote a piece for Variety discussing his tension with his co-star Ali Larter that resulted in his firing from Heroes.

== Filmography ==
=== Films ===
| Year | Film | Role | Notes |
|---|---|---|---|
| 1997 | Love Jones | Eddie Coles | |
| 1997 | Hoodlum | Tyrone | |
| 1998 | He Got Game | D'Andre Mackey | |
| 2000 | Masquerade | Otis | TV movie |
| 2001 | Scam | Gordie | Short |
| 2002 | Joe and Max | Joe Louis | TV movie |
| 2002 | Drumline | Sean Taylor | |
| 2004 | Walking on Sunshine | Al | Short |
| 2006 | The Last Adam | Bobby Jackson | |
| 2007 | F*ck You Pay Me! | Darian Drake | Short |
| 2009 | Red Sands | Ryan | |
| 2010 | Blackstar Warrior | Lando Calrissian | TV Short |
| 2011 | Pizza Man | Leo | |
| 2012 | Savages | Frankie | |
| 2012 | California Winter | Larry Johnson | |
| 2014 | Blackstar Warrior | Tyson Roderick | TV Short |
| 2014 | Drumline: A New Beat | Sean Taylor | TV movie |
| 2014 | American Sniper | Instructor Rolle | |
| 2015 | My Favorite Five | Matthew | |
| 2015 | Any Day | Troy | |
| 2015 | Dancer and the Dame | Agent Shepherd | |
| 2016 | Love Is All You Need? | Coach Thompson | |
| 2017 | Fixed | Phil | |
| 2018 | Headgame | The Elder | |
| 2018 | Murder | ADA Malachi Sandel | TV movie |

=== Television ===
| Year | Title | Role | Notes |
|---|---|---|---|
| 1996 | Due South | Tyree Cameron | Episode: "White Men Can't Jump to Conclusions" |
| 1999 | Turks | Officer Tom May | Episode: "Pilot" & "Hearts of Fire" |
| 1999 | The '60's | Emmet Taylor | TV Mini Series |
| 1999 | Any Day Now | Wade Garver | Episode: "It's Not You, It's Me" |
| 1999–2000 | Buffy the Vampire Slayer | Forrest Gates | Recurring cast: Season 4 |
| 2001 | FreakyLinks | Boomer Truman | Episode: "Subject: Still I Rise" |
| 2001 | JAG | Lieutenant Crawford | Episode: "Dog Robber: Part 1 & 2" |
| 2002 | Providence | - | Recurring cast: season 5 |
| 2003 | Tru Calling | Blake | Episode: "Past Tense" |
| 2003 | 24 | Guard Buchanan | Episode: "Day 3: 5:00 p.m.-6:00 p.m." |
| 2004 | CSI: Miami | Brad Foster | Episode: "Complications" |
| 2004 | Threat Matrix | Tom Purdy /Ibrahim Kureshi | Episode: "Extremist Makeover" |
| 2004 | NCIS | P.O. Howard Carter | Episode: "The Truth Is Out There" |
| 2005 | Bones | D.A. Andrew Levitt | Episode: "The Girl in the Fridge" |
| 2005–06 | Smallville | Nam-Ek | Episode: 2 episodes |
| 2006–07 | Heroes | D. L. Hawkins | Recurring cast: season 1, guest: season 2 |
| 2009 | ER | Police Officer | Episode: "A Long, Strange Trip" |
| 2009 | Private Practice | Ryan | Episode: "Wait and See" |
| 2010 | Castle | Special Agent Jason Avery | Episode: "Tick, Tick, Tick..." & "Boom!" |
| 2010 | Criminal Minds | Kaman Scott | Episode: "Devil's Night" |
| 2010 | CSI: Crime Scene Investigation | Kyle Decker | Episode: "Wild Life" |
| 2011 | Franklin & Bash | Dante | Episode: "The Bangover" |
| 2012 | CSI: Miami | Matthew Stone | Episode: "Friendly Fire" |
| 2013 | The Client List | Detective Monroe | Recurring cast: season 2 |
| 2014 | The League | Tyree | Episode: "Breast Awareness Month" |
| 2014 | The Mentalist | Elon Bell | Episode: "Black Market" |
| 2015 | Agent Carter | Samuel "Happy Sam" Sawyer | Episode: "The Iron Ceiling" |
| 2016 | Second Chance | Lenny | Episode: "May Old Acquaintance Be Forgot" |
| 2016 | The People v. O. J. Simpson | Dennis Schatzman | Recurring cast |
| 2016 | Mary + Jane | Nate | Episode: "Neighborhood Watch" |
| 2017 | Doubt | ADA Vincent Todd | Episode: "The Return" |
| 2017–18 | Mom | Ray Stabler | Recurring cast: Season 4-5 |
| 2017–18 | Major Crimes | Assistant Chief Leo Mason | Recurring cast: season 5, Main cast: season 6 |
| 2017–18 | The Magicians | King Idri of Loria | Recurring cast: season 2, guest: season 3 |
| 2018 | Liza on Demand | Mark | Episode: "Valentine's Day" |
| 2019 | 9-1-1 | Captain Ronnie Cooper | Recurring cast: season 3 |
| 2020 | Hawaii Five-0 | Capt. Ingram | Episode: "A 'ohe ia e loa'a aku, he ulua kapapa no ka moana" |
| 2020 | Bob Hearts Abishola | Guy | Episode: "Randy's a Wrangler" |
| 2020 | Spider-Man | Baron Mordo | Voice, episode: "Amazing Friends" |
| 2020–22 | Charmed | Dexter Vaughn | Guest: season 2, recurring cast: season 4 |
| 2021 | Rebel | Randall Vokelberg | Recurring cast |
| 2021 | All American | President Zeke Allen | Episode: "All American: Homecoming" |
| 2021 | The Girl in the Woods | Alex | Recurring cast |
| 2022 | All American: Homecoming | President Zeke Allen | Recurring cast |
| 2023 | Goosebumps | Ben Howard | Recurring cast |

=== Web ===
| Year | Title | Role | Notes |
|---|---|---|---|
| 2018 | Liza on Demand | Marc | Episode "Valentine's Day" |

=== Video games ===
| Year | Title | Role | Notes |
|---|---|---|---|
| 2017 | Hidden Agenda | Tom Nelson | |
