= Buffy studies =

Academic study of the Buffyverse

Buffy studies, also called Buffyology, is the study of Joss Whedon's popular television series Buffy the Vampire Slayer and, to a lesser extent, its spin-off program Angel. It explores issues related to gender, family, ethics and other philosophical issues as expressed through the content of these shows in the fictional Buffyverse.

Neda Ulaby of NPR describes Buffy as having a "special following among academics, some of whom have staked a claim in what they call 'Buffy Studies'". Though not widely recognized as a distinct discipline, the term "Buffy studies" is commonly used amongst the academic Buffy-related writings.

== Development as academic field ==
Slayage logo

The original run of Buffy (1997–2003) eventually led to the publication of a number of books and hundreds of articles examining the themes of the show from a wide range of disciplinary perspectives including sociology, psychology, philosophy, theology, and women's studies. One of the first texts was written by David Graeber, who published the article Rebel Without a God in 1998. Since January 2001, Slayage: The Online Journal of Buffy Studies has published essays on the topic quarterly, and it continues to do so. Fighting the Forces: What's at Stake in Buffy the Vampire Slayer was published in 2002, and since then many more Buffy books have been published by academic book publishers. There have also been a number of international conferences on the topic. "College courses across the globe are devoted to the show, and secondary schools in Australia and New Zealand also provide Buffy classes." The topic can even be undertaken as part of a Master's degree in Cult Film & TV at Brunel University, London. Increasingly, Angel is being analyzed alongside its predecessor, e.g. in the 2005 publication, Reading Angel.

The creator of Buffy, Joss Whedon, has responded to the scholarly reaction to his series: "I think it's great that the academic community has taken an interest in the show. I think it's always important for academics to study popular culture, even if the thing they are studying is idiotic. If it's successful or made a dent in culture, then it is worthy of study to find out why. Buffy, on the other hand is, I hope, not idiotic. We think very carefully about what we're trying to say emotionally, politically, and even philosophically while we're writing it... it really is, apart from being a pop-culture phenomenon, something that is deeply layered textually episode by episode."

The response to this scholarly attention has had its critics. In 2005 Jes Battis, who authored Blood Relations in Buffy and Angel, has stated that study of the Buffyverse "invokes an uneasy combination of enthusiasm and ire", and meets "a certain amount of disdain from within the halls of the academy". Despite this, following the Third International Slayage Conference on the Whedonverses which was held June 5–8, 2008 at Henderson State University in Arkadelphia, Arkansas., and acknowledging "the extensive growth of Whedon scholarship" beyond Buffy itself, the Whedon Studies Association was officially formed as "a non-profit organization devoted to the study of the works of Joss Whedon and his associates."

Following multiple allegations made against Whedon in 2022, the organisation rebranded itself as the Association for the Study of Buffy+, with a new mission statement which clarified how they now "define Buffy+ Studies as the scholarly exploration of Buffy the Vampire Slayer and its related texts. This includes the work of the many contributors to the Buffyverse (i.e., the diegetic world of Buffy), transmedial or intertextual engagements with the Buffyverse, and texts influenced by or sharing thematic concerns or representational strategies with the Buffyverse writ large."

== Examples of explored themes ==
=== Gender studies ===
- Lorna Jowett, 2005: Sex and The Slayer: A Gender Studies Primer for the Buffy Fan.
  In this paper, published by Wesleyan University Press, Jowett, senior lecturer in American Studies at The University of Northampton and Buffy fan, states that ‘Buffy may be “Barbie with a kung-fu grip”, but she is still Barbie’ (p. 197). Jowett identifies the show as being “post-feminist”, while arguing that it fails to challenge gender stereotypes in meaningful ways. Jowetts book's first 3 chapters are entitled: Girl Power, Good Girls and Bad Girls, in which Jowett dissects the stereotypes within the female characters that, she argues, are reinforced by the show. The next three chapters are broken into the male stereotypes: Tough men, New Men and Dead Boys. Jowett states that reinforcement of stereotypes exists within the show for male characters as well.

=== Pop culture studies ===
- Dee Amy-Chinn and Milly Williamson, 2005: The Vampire Spike in text and fandom: Unsettling oppositions in Buffy the Vampire Slayer.
  Amy-Chinn, senior lecturer at Oxford Brookes University and Williamson, of Brunel University, focus on a specific character in this paper, Spike, who as argued by the authors, embodies “the simultaneous expression of erotic repulsion and attraction” and a “fear of and desire for the ‘other’”. The authors compare and contrast the character of Spike to the show’s general treatment of sexuality and self.
- Marcella Lins, 2020: Libertarianism in Pop Culture: Applying libertarian principles to Buffy the Vampire Slayer’s Season 4.
  Marcella Lins, researcher at Universidade Anhembi Morumbi, revisits Buffy’s Season 4 and analyzes it through a libertarian perspective. Over this season, a great number of relevant subjects are discussed, such as the form and function of the state, its relationship with society, the subversion of public authorities and the morality of law and punishment. It is expected that the successful adoption of libertarian ethics and principles to understand this TV show might bring out Libertarianism as a valuable philosophical alternative to be taken into account when looking for solutions to current issues.

=== Media studies ===
- Rhonda Wilcox, 2005: Why Buffy Matters: The Art of Buffy the Vampire Slayer.
  Why does Buffy Matter? In this paper Wilcox makes the attempt to bring this television show into perspective for us. Wilcox says, “It matters because it shows that television can be art, and deserves to be so studied…the depth of the characters, the truth of the stories, the profundity of the themes, and their precise incarnation in language, sound and image – all of these matter.” (Wilcox 419). While giving in depth details of all of these elements and also drawing on other academic articles about Buffy, Wilcox helps to bring this television series to the same page for all fans interested in Buffy; from those who are a bit unsure about the series all the way to those die hard fans.
- Wilcox, Rhonda & Lavery, David, 2002. “Fighting the Forces: What’s at Stake for Buffy The Vampire Slayer.”
  "Fighting the Forces” explores the struggle to create meaning in an impressive example of popular culture, the television series phenomenon “Buffy the Vampire Slayer”. These essays analyze the social and cultural issues implicit in the series and place it in its literary context. Editors Wilcox and Lavery have opened an intriguing doorway to fans of this show, “Issues of gender, generations, race, class, and violence are treated seriously, through an in-depth analysis of both main characters and sidekicks. Class and race are discussed through a study of Buffy’s and her friends’ relationship with the two "other" slayers, American white trash Faith and Jamaican Kendra.” Wilcox and Lavery analyze these many concepts while critiquing other scholarly essays such as “God, New Religious Movements, and Buffy the Vampire Slayer” and “Everything Philosophical About Buffy the Vampire Slayer.”

=== Family studies ===
- Burr, Vivien, and Jarvis, C., September 2007. “Imagining the Family Representations of Alternative Lifestyles in Buffy the Vampire Slayer.”
  This paper offers studies of the family and how media families affect the views of young people. Through the television show, Buffy the Vampire Slayer, Burr explores the dangers and advantages of non-normative family forms, especially the non-genetic or ‘chosen’ families. (Burr) There is also a focus that Buffy “endorses a non-hierarchical, ‘democratic vision’ of the family. (Giddens, 1992) Also, Buffy can generate ‘interactive social worlds’ that are a main focus of the spreading of new social, familial practices (Plummer, 1995). Family is viewed in a new and different way through Buffy that leads to such innovations as well in practice and research on the subject.

=== Aesthetics ===
- Kociemba, David, 2006: “Actually, it explains a lot": Reading the Opening Title Sequences in Buffy the Vampire Slayer.”
  This paper examines the opening title sequences of the television series in detail, looking at the use of imagery, color, editing, logo, credits, title, and scoring. The opening title sequences of Buffy the Vampire Slayer function as a microcosm of the series itself. They reveal the influence of the creators’ perception of their audience and their own work, the medium's narrative and artistic conventions, and the media industry's own practices. They construct the series’ past, shape the viewer's present experience of the episode, and prepare the way for future narratives. This article won the "Short Mr. Pointy" award for excellence in scholarship in Buffy Studies from the Whedon Studies Association.

== Additional works ==
Book title	Released	Description	Author(s)
The Afterlife of Genre: Remnants of the Trauerspiel in Buffy the Vampire Slayer	2014	An analysis, drawing on Walter Benjamin, of the hidden theology of Buffy the Vampire Slayer and the television series in general.	Anthony Curtis Adler
Buffy and Angel Conquer the Internet: Essays on Online Fandom	2009	A multidisciplinary examination of the two series' fandom.	Mary Kirby-Diaz (editor)
Buffy Goes Dark	2009	A look at the final two seasons of Buffy, aired on UPN.	Lynne Y. Edwards, Elizabeth L. Rambo, James B. South
Faith and Choice in the Works of Joss Whedon	2008–04	Exploration of the spiritual and ethical choices made in the Buffyverse by K. Dale Koontz.	K. Dale Koontz
The Existential Joss Whedon: Evil and Human Freedom in Buffy the Vampire Slayer, Angel, Firefly and Serenity	2006–04	This book examines Joss Whedon's work in an existential light, focusing on ethics, good vs evil, choice, and free will.	Michael Richardson, J. Douglas Rabb
The Aesthetics of Culture in Buffy the Vampire Slayer	2006–01	Matthew Pateman's examination of the cultural commentary contained in Buffy.	Matthew Pateman
Buffy the Vampire Slayer (BFI TV Classics)	2005–12	Extended overview of the history of Buffy.	Anne Billson
Why Buffy Matters: The Art of Buffy the Vampire Slayer	2005–10	Rhonda Wilcox, presents an argument for Buffy as an art form as worthy of respect and acknowledgment as film or literature.	Rhonda V. Wilcox
Reading Angel: The TV Spin-off With a Soul	2005–09	Collection covering many topics including the cinematic aesthetics of Angel, its music, shifting portrayals of masculinity, the noir Los Angeles setting, and the superhero.	Stacey Abbott (editor)
Blood Relations: Chosen Families in Buffy the Vampire Slayer and Angel	2005–06	Explores conceptions of family explored in Buffy and Angel.	Jes Battis
Sex and the Slayer: A Gender Studies Primer for the Buffy Fan	2005–04	Sex and the Slayer provides an introduction to feminism through Buffy.	Lorna Jowett
Five Seasons of Angel	2004–10	A science-fiction novelist and other writers contribute a collection of essays on Angel.	Glenn Yeffeth (editor)
Televised Morality: The Case of Buffy the Vampire Slayer	2004–04	Book arguing that TV helps shapes society's moral values, and in this case specifically Buffy.	Gregory Stevenson
What Would Buffy Do?: The Vampire Slayer as Spiritual Guide	2004–04	Look at the spiritual guidelines and religious themes on display in Buffy despite the atheism of the show's creator.	Jana Riess
Reading the Vampire Slayer	2004–03	The book gives in-depth analysis highlighting the many hidden metaphors held within Buffy and Angel.	Roz Kaveney
Seven Seasons of Buffy	2003–09	A science-fiction novelist and other writers contribute a collection of essays on Buffy.	Glenn Yeffeth (editor), David Brin (contributor), Justine Larbalestier (contributor)
Slayer Slang: A Buffy the Vampire Slayer Lexicon	2003–07	An in depth study on the post-modern youth language used in Buffy.	Michael Adams
Bite Me: Narrative Structures and Buffy the Vampire Slayer	2003–05	Relating narrative structures with: audience pleasure, mise en scène, and the use of symbolism and metaphor.	Sue Turnbull
Joss Whedon: The Genius Behind Buffy	2003–05	Short biography of the creator of Buffy, featuring interviews with various casts and crews he has worked with, and an analysis of his creative processes.	Candace Havens
Buffy the Vampire Slayer and Philosophy: Fear and Trembling in Sunnydale	2003–03	Links classical philosophy to the ethics in Buffy.	James B. South, William Irwin (editor)
Fighting the Forces: What's at Stake in Buffy the Vampire Slayer	2002–04	Looks at the struggle to examine meaning in Buffy.	Rhonda V. Wilcox (Editor), David Lavery (editor)
Music, Sound, and Silence in Buffy the Vampire Slayer	2010–05	This book describes the show's imaginative and widely varied use of music, sound and silence.	Paul Attinello, Janet K. Halfyard (editor), Vanessa Knights (editor)
Once Bitten: An Unofficial Guide to the World of Angel	2004–11	Features a history of the show; a section profiling the best websites; a look at Buffy and Angel's recognition in academic circles; a complete episode guide to all five series of Angel; and exclusive behind-the-scenes photos.	Nikki Stafford
Bite Me! Sarah Michelle Gellar and "Buffy the Vampire Slayer"	1998–12	Revised and updated to include information about all six seasons of Buffy, this ultimate guide to one of televisions hottest shows also includes capsule reviews of the full first three seasons of the spin-off Angel, with more emphasis put on the crossover episodes between the two shows.	Nikki Stafford
Bite Me! An Unofficial Guide to the World of Buffy the Vampire Slayer	2002–09	BITE ME! spotlights Sarah's role in the show and features entertaining commentary on each episode, as well as background information about the stories in them (Re-released in 2008).	Nikki Stafford
Undead TV: Essays on "Buffy the Vampire Slayer"	2008–01	In Undead TV, media studies scholars tackle the Buffy phenomenon and its many afterlives in popular culture, the television industry, the Internet, and academic criticism. Contributors engage with critical issues such as stardom, gender identity, spectatorship, fandom, and intertextuality.	Elana Levine (Editor), Lisa Parks (Editor)
Buffy the Vampire Slayer: The Monster Book	2000–08	This book delves into the folklore that inspired the show's bad guys - their mythology, science, cultural, literary and historical origins.	Christopher Golden, Thomas E. Sniegoski
Buffy Chronicles: The Unofficial Companion to Buffy the Vampire Slayer	1998–12	The Buffy Chronicles includes a retrospective of the film that started it all, a history of vampire legends, cast information, plot synopses, and behind-the-scenes trivia. A guide to the alternative music and bands that add so much atmosphere, this book has everything Buffy's fans could want.	Ngaire E. Genge.
Dusted: The Unauthorized Guide to Buffy the Vampire Slayer	2010–01	Dusted details and reviews all 144 episodes of Buffy the Vampire Slayerin exhaustive detail—with story summaries, quotes, notes on magic, character development, a rolling Slayer Kill-Count and more.	Lawrence Miles, Lars Pearson, Christa Dickson
The Q Guide to Buffy the Vampire Slayer	2008–03	Go behind the scenes of the smash hit television show that just won't die! From its origins as a reviled movie to its seven-year reign on the WB and UPN, Buffy spawned a new generation of vampire lovers.	Gregory L. Norris
The Complete Slayer: An unofficial and unauthorised guide to every episode of Buffy the Vampire Slayer	2004–11	Whether you're a seasoned Slayerette or a novice, this bumper guide to the complete seven series is your indispensable companion to Buffy's universe.	Keith Topping
Romance in Buffy the Vampire Slayer: Love at Stake	2014–07	Revisits the sometimes destructive and undeniably unforgettable relationships that make up the Buffyverse.	Carrie Sessarego
Blood, sex and education - teenage problems and fears as presented in 'Buffy the Vampire Slayer'	2007–07	The writer analyses how and to what extent teenager problems and highschool youth culture combined with the fantastic motif of vampirism manage to address especially a young audience.	David Gerlach
The Fool's Journey Through Sunnydale: A Look At The Archetypes of The Major Arcana through Buffy the Vampire Slayer	2010–02	Exploring the meanings of each Major Arcana card as depicted in lore, and in the hit television series, Buffy the Vampire Slayer.	Mary Caelsto
The Quotable Slayer (Buffy the Vampire Slayer)	2003–12	Collection of the funniest, most telling, and often poignant quotes from the Emmy-nominated television show.	Micol Ostow, Steve Brezenoff
Hollywood Vampire: A revised and updated unofficial and unauthorised guide to Angel	2004–01	This unofficial fan bible is updated to include every episode of seasons three and four, encompassing the highlights of the show in categories.	Keith Topping
Buffy in the Classroom: Essays on Teaching with the Vampire Slayer	2010–10	This book combines the academic and practical aspects of teaching by exploring the ways in which Buffy the Vampire Slayer is taught, internationally, through both interdisciplinary and discipline-based approaches. Essays describe how Buffy can be used to explain—and encourage further discussion of—television's narrative complexity, archetypal characters, morality, feminism, identity, ethics, non-verbal communication, film production, media and culture, censorship, and Shakespeare, among other topics.	Jodie A. Kreider (editor), Meghan K. Winchell (editor)
The Physics of the Buffyverse	2006–12	In the tradition of the bestselling The Physics of Star Trek, acclaimed science writer Jennifer Ouellette explains fundamental concepts in the physical sciences through examples culled from the hit TV shows Buffy the Vampire Slayer and its spin-off, Angel.	Jennifer Ouellette
Buffy, Ballads, and Bad Guys Who Sing: Music in the Worlds of Joss Whedon	2010–11	Buffy, Ballads, and Bad Guys Who Sing: Music in the Worlds of Joss Whedon studies the significant role that music plays in these works, from Buffy the Vampire Slayer to the internet musical Dr. Horrible's Sing-Along Blog.	Kendra Preston Leonard (editor)
The Truth of Buffy: Essays on Fiction Illuminating Reality	2008–06	In this collection of critical essays, 15 authors from several disciplines, including literature, the visual arts, theatre, philosophy, and political science, study ways in which Buffy illuminates viewers' real-life experiences.	Emily Dial-Driver (editor), Sally Emmons-Featherston (editor)
The Girl's Got Bite: The Original Unauthorized Guide to Buffy's World	1998	This companion guide covers all aspects of the Buffy phenomena-from the 1992 feature film starring Kristy Swanson and Luke Perry, to the development and production of the current hit TV series starring Sarah Michelle Gellar.	Kathleen Tracy
Redeemed: The Unauthorized Guide To Angel	2006–11	Redeemed critiques the entire show in berserk detail, with an eye toward reconciling the features of the "Angel"-verse against themselves, and dissecting the formidable vision of "Angel" producers Joss Whedon, Tim Minear, Jeffrey Bell and their Mutant Enemy colleagues.	Lars Pearson, Christa Dickson

== See also ==
- Buffy the Vampire Slayer in popular culture
- Donaldism
- List of female action heroes
- Women warriors in literature and culture
