= Anya Jenkins =

Character in Buffy the Vampire Slayer

- Buffy the Vampire Slayer character
- Emma Caulfield as Anya Jenkins
- First appearance: "The Wish" (1998)
- Last appearance: "Own It, Part V: It's on You" (2016)
- Portrayed by: Emma Caulfield

In-universe information
- Full name: Anya Christina Emmanuella Jenkins (Note: In "Checkpoint", Anya gives her full name as "Anya Christina Emmanuella Jenkins" while trying to convince the Watcher's Council she is an ordinary human. Later, in "Selfless", she calls it a "lame-ass made up maiden name". In the 1999 Sunnydale High Yearbook tie-in book, she is named "Anya Emerson".)
- Aliases: Anyanka; Aud
- Species: Vengeance demon (seasons 3, 6–7); Human (seasons 3–7)
- Occupation: Vengeance demon (seasons 3, 6–7); Cashier (seasons 5–6)
- Affiliation: Scooby Gang
- Significant other: Xander Harris (seasons 4–6)

Anya Jenkins (/ˈɑːnjə/ AHN-yə) is a fictional character who appears in the television series Buffy the Vampire Slayer. She is introduced in the third-season episode "The Wish" as Anyanka, a vengeance demon who wreaks havoc by granting the wishes of women wronged by men. After losing her abilities, she becomes trapped in human form. In the fourth season, she begins a romantic relationship with Buffy Summers's friend Xander Harris, which ends during the sixth season. She also joins the Scooby Gang, (Note: Buffy's core group of friends who help her battle the supernatural) helping battle the supernatural until her death in the series finale, "Chosen". Anya is unfamiliar with social conventions, and her blunt, tactless speech is often used for comic relief. Her character arc explores how she learns to be human and eventually develops a love for humankind.

Anya is portrayed by the American actress Emma Caulfield and was initially written to appear in one episode of Buffy's third season. Caulfield was asked to return for further appearances, and the character's role was expanded for the fourth season following the departure of Cordelia Chase. She became a part of the show's main cast in the fifth, sixth, and seventh seasons; in the latter two, the writers focused on exploring her relationship with Xander, especially their breakup and its aftermath. Anya is considered a fan-favorite character, owing to her comedy and Caulfield's performance. Journalists have praised both Anya's comedic and dramatic aspects; they also commented on her relationship with Xander and her death. Academics have analyzed Anya's character and relationships, with studies focusing on identity, symbolism, gender, and sexuality.

== Appearances ==
=== Seasons 3 and 4 ===
Anya is introduced in the third-season episode "The Wish", in which she poses as a student at Sunnydale High School. She is revealed to be the 1,120-year-old vengeance demon Anyanka, who grants the wishes of scorned women. She seeks to exact vengeance for the popular cheerleader Cordelia Chase, who is distraught after catching her boyfriend Xander Harris kissing his friend Willow Rosenberg. Anya prompts Cordelia to say that she wishes that Buffy Summers, who is the Slayer (Note: The Slayer is a young woman with supernatural abilities chosen by fate to battle against vampires, demons and other forces of darkness.) and Xander and Willow's friend, never came to Sunnydale. Anya grants her wish and creates an alternative reality where Buffy is absent and vampires have overtaken the town. After discerning what has happened, Rupert Giles, a Watcher, (Note: A Watcher is a member of a council that guides the Slayers' training and helps battle supernatural evil through tracking and studying.) summons Anyanka and destroys the necklace that contains her powers, returning the world to normal, and leaving Anya a mortal and powerless teenage girl.

Anya returns in "Doppelgangland", seeking to regain her powers as a vengeance demon but fails. In "The Prom", she attends the prom with Xander and develops feelings for him, leading her to ask him out again in "Graduation Day". When he tells her of the Mayor's planned ascension, she informs the Scooby Gang that the event involves a transformation into a pure demon. She decides to flee town and confesses her feelings to Xander before leaving. Anya returns to Sunnydale early in the fourth season, still infatuated with Xander. She has sex with him in an attempt to move on, but her feelings persist; the two begin dating, and Anya joins the Scooby Gang. Her straightforward, tactless remarks put her at odds with the other Scoobies, especially Willow, who distrusts her. Still, she helps the group battle many demons.

=== Seasons 5–7 ===
In the fifth season, while playing The Game of Life, she discovers her love for money and capitalism. Anya's budding retail skills encourage Giles to hire her as a cashier at his magic shop called The Magic Box. The Scooby Gang learn of the god Glory; she seeks to return to her hell dimension by using the blood of Buffy's younger sister, Dawn, to open a portal, which would cause dimensions to bleed into one another. Anya provides demonic knowledge and suggestions that help the Scoobies battle Glory. She also struggles to understand her newfound mortality, expressing confusion and shock over the death of Buffy's mother, Joyce. During the impending apocalypse at the end of season five, Xander proposes to Anya, and they are engaged for most of the sixth season. She is often frustrated with him, as he refuses to announce their engagement until Halloween. At their wedding, Xander leaves Anya at the altar, because he fears he will become abusive like his father. Grief-stricken, Anya accepts an offer to become a demon again and tries to exact vengeance on Xander. However, she cannot find anyone who wishes vengeance on Xander, so she takes comfort in sex with the vampire Spike, an act that puts her relationship with Xander in jeopardy. In the sixth-season finale, she assists the Scooby Gang in stopping Willow, who is grief-stricken by the murder of her girlfriend Tara Maclay, from destroying the world with witchcraft.

In the seventh season, Anya does not enjoy her return to being a vengeance demon—her experience as a human has led to empathy, which makes exacting vengeance too painful for her to manage. In flashbacks in the episode "Selfless", it is revealed that she was initially a human named Aud; her lover, Olaf, cheated on her, and she transformed him into a troll. Impressed, D'Hoffryn, the leader of vengeance demons, granted her wish-granting abilities and renamed her Anyanka. Over more than 1,000 years, she became obsessed with her work and defined herself through vengeance. In the present, after her demon friend Halfrek encourages her to return to her former level of work, Anya takes vengeance on a group of college boys by unleashing a spider-like demon that kills them. Buffy decides that she must kill Anya to prevent further harm, but their battle is interrupted by D'Hoffryn, who has been summoned by Willow. D'Hoffryn asks Anya what she wants, and she asks that her vengeance be reversed. D'Hoffryn tells her the price will be the life of a vengeance demon; Anya agrees, but D'Hoffryn kills Halfrek instead and strips her of her powers, making her mortal once again. Anya decides that she has been too dependent on others and resolves to find an independent purpose in life for herself.

Anya eventually rejoins the Scooby Gang as season seven focuses on the fight against the First Evil, an ancient primordial force, and reconciles with Xander. The two admit that they still love each other and have sex, but they never officially resume their relationship. In the series finale, "Chosen", Anya fights with the others in the battle against the First Evil at Sunnydale High School and is killed by a Bringer, a servant of the First Evil. Her body lies in the school's remains, although Xander attempts to locate her while fleeing the collapsing building.

=== Comic books ===
In the Buffy the Vampire Slayer Season Ten, beginning with "New Rules, Part I" (2014) and ending with "Own It, Part V: It's on You" (2016), Anya returns as a ghost and talks to Xander about their relationship, especially his guilt over abandoning her. It is revealed that she is a fake ghost created by D'Hoffryn to exact vengeance on Xander for "robbing" her from him. The fake version of Anya realizes that D'Hoffryn had manipulated and controlled her for much of her life, and she turns on him. Before departing, she assures Xander that he is a good man and that the original Anya would forgive him as well.

=== Other ===
Anya has appeared in various other Buffyverse media. In the video game Buffy the Vampire Slayer: Chaos Bleeds (2003), she must be rescued after being kidnapped by vampires and an alternate version appears as a boss. In 2019, Boom! Studios began publishing a comic-book reboot of Buffy. The comics modify certain elements; unlike the original show, in which she is a later-season addition, Anya is introduced at the beginning. Writer Casey Gilly incorporated Anya as Buffy's training partner in the Boom! Studios comic series Buffy the Last Vampire Slayer (2021–2022), because she liked the character and wanted to explore her further. In 2023, Audible released a narrative podcast titled Slayers: A Buffyverse Story, in which alternate-universe versions of Anya and Anyanka appear. The podcast's primary universe features Cordelia as the Slayer, while Anya is a witch and her best friend. Additionally, Anya has made appearances in several Buffy the Vampire Slayer novels, including Crossings (2002), The Wisdom of War (2002), and Big Bad (2022).

== Development and casting ==
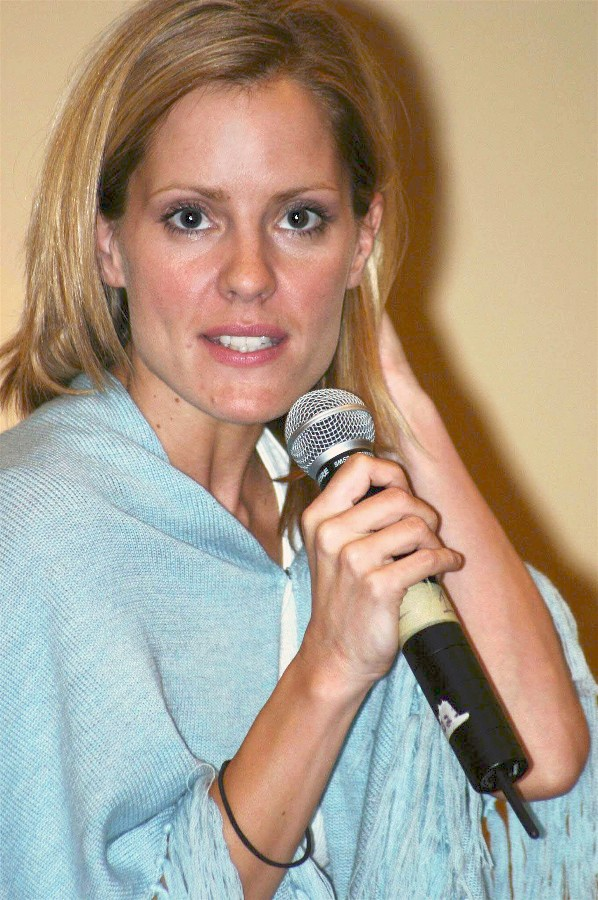
Actress Emma Caulfield (pictured 2004) portrayed Anya.

Anya was initially written to appear in one episode of the third season of the supernatural horror drama television series Buffy the Vampire Slayer. The American actress Emma Caulfield, who had worked with one of the show's casting directors, was chosen for the role after she met with the series' creator, Joss Whedon. When portraying Anya's demon form, she wore prosthetic makeup, including head, chest, and hair pieces. A month after her initial guest appearance, Caulfield was asked to return to the show. Following the completion of the third season, she was informally expected to appear in the fourth. After Cordelia (Charisma Carpenter) left the show at the end of the third season, Anya was incorporated to replace her frankness; Caulfield was asked to appear in an "indefinite amount of episodes" in July 1999. The consulting producer David Greenwalt highlighted Anya and Spike (Note: Spike, portrayed by James Marsters, became a part of the main cast in the fourth season after making recurring and guest appearances in the second and third seasons.) as key characters in replacing Cordelia because of their lack of tact and larger-than-life qualities.

Caulfield was promoted to a series regular in the fifth season. Whedon said it was a "delicate" decision and a matter of whether the character aligned with the group dynamic. Whedon chose to promote Caulfield so that Anya could assume Cordelia's "wiseacre" role. He stated that the decision made "perfect sense" due to the character's alienated, blunt nature and Caulfield's comedic timing, adding that one does not "usually get that much funny in a girl that pretty". Caulfield said that she was not promoted earlier due to being unable to "get into the head of ... Whedon".

Buffy's sixth season focuses on themes of disillusionment, responsibilities and the realities of life. Whedon wanted to explore the "frightening" idea that "monsters is one thing, marriage is another", especially for a young man such as Xander, leading to the events of the episode "Hell's Bells" where he leaves Anya at the altar. In 2001, Caulfield said her acting focused on Anya's "human" aspects in "the very broadest sense of the word", since she did not want to portray her as a "cartoon character". She found the process difficult due to Buffy's frequent tonal shifts. For the seventh season, the writers wanted to explore how Anya and Xander would continue with their lives and navigate being friends after their "intense" relationship, according to the co-executive producer David Fury. The team wrote the two as growing apart before bonding again to deepen their love, though they were no longer in a relationship. Whedon also wanted to kill a character off in a sudden, brutal manner in the series finale. He chose Anya, because Caulfield expressed disinterest in returning to the show, which he attributed to a poor relationship with 20th Century Fox Television in which she found herself "ill-used" and wanting to "move on". The death scene was the last that Caulfield shot.

== Character and analysis ==
=== Characterization ===
Anya often provides comic relief in Buffy the Vampire Slayer. Due to her time as a vengeance demon, she lacks social skills; she is naive, literal-minded, tactless, and, at times, unintentionally offensive. Like Xander, she takes a straightforward, unapologetic approach to sexuality, frequently and openly discussing her sexual desires. Her blunt remarks are often used for humor, with her being "the butt of jokes", according to author Lorna Jowett. Articles in /Film and Den of Geek interpreted Anya as an autistic and neurodivergent-coded character, respectively. Producer David Solomon described her character as "flighty", while Caulfield dubbed her "a renegade with her own philosophy". According to Valerie Estelle Frankel, Anya replaces Cordelia as the Scooby Gang's "acerbic truth-teller". Jana Riess, author of What Would Buffy Do?, described Anya as a mouthpiece for the negative feelings that other characters refuse to discuss. Additionally, Anya is afraid of bunnies, which becomes a running gag.

Anya's character arc explores how she learns to be human and eventually develops a love for humankind. In his book Televised Morality, the New Testament professor Gregory Stevenson wrote that her development shows how moral judgments are influenced by the extent to which one values human life: In the third season, she flees town, unlike Xander, who says he will stay for his friends. However, in the fifth season, she helps fight Glory because of her love for Xander, and in the seventh season, she battles the First Evil due to a professed appreciation for humanity. According to the sociologist Ananya Mukherjea, Anya's arc is Gothic, since her identity formation involves considerable pain and death, in contrast to her desire for love and security. As examples, she cited Anya's fear of death after becoming mortal; the ridicule she experiences for her speech and interests; and her dying shortly after developing an understanding of her identity.

=== Symbolism and identity ===
Academics have discussed symbolic readings of Anya's character. Gregory J. Thompson and Sally Emmons-Featherson regarded the Scooby Gang as an example of an "allegorical characterization", with Anya representing materialism, greed, and unadorned truth. On the other hand, Elizabeth L. Rambo, an associate professor of English, wrote that she could be perceived as "a reasonable facsimile" for a third culture kid due to her zealous reverence for perceived American values such as capitalism. She drew parallels to "hidden immigrants", who have similar physical appearances to those around them but have differing perspectives on life due to their experiences with other cultures.

Frankel and the Canadian scholar Jan Jagodzinski argued that Anya is a symbolic reflection of Buffy's other characters. Frankel interpreted Anya as a representation of "the simplistic innermost child Buffy left behind" in later seasons. She stated that she is "a force for seizing the pleasures of life", contrasting Buffy's depression and sense of duty. She also compared Anya to the Freudian concept of the id—the impulsive, pleasure-seeking part of the human mind—due to her directness, fear of death, and simplistic manner of expressing herself. Alternatively, Jagodzinski viewed Anya as Willow's abject self, saying that Willow's description of her as a "thousand-year-old capitalist ex-demon with rabbit phobia" symbolically represents "a reformed bad girl who is off drugs but into consumerism".

Caroline Ruddell wrote that Buffy frequently explores Gothic doubles, particularly through vampires, and that Anya is doubled by her identity as a vengeance demon. According to the English professor Emily Dial-Driver, Anya is the character who most frequently oscillates between "light and dark" in the show, with her "dark side" metaphorized by her demonic form. She contended that despite Anya's character being "immature and erratic", her request for her vengeance to be reversed in "Selfless" represents an eventual recognition and rejection of her "dark side". In Why Buffy Matters, the author Rhonda Wilcox argued that Anya's different identities are represented and contrasted through her names—she uses Anya when attempting to define herself as Xander's future wife; Anyanka (chosen by D'Hoffryn) when she is a vengeance demon; and Aud when she was a human. In "Selfless", Anya rejects her role as a vengeance demon and Xander's offer to help. Wilcox asserted that these rejections and her continued use of the self-chosen name "Anya" demonstrate her decision to define her identity herself rather than accepting what is imposed by others.

=== Gender, sexuality, and relationships ===
Jowett asserted that Anya's character alternates between embodying feminist and feminine ideals, with her heterosexual romances hampering her independence and identity formation. She claimed that heterosexuality and power are presented as "incompatible": Anya gains her supernatural abilities after a failed romantic relationship, enters another upon losing them, and regains them when that relationship ends. Elana Levine maintained that Anya rejects postfeminist ideas in favor of third-wave feminist ones, despite initially oscillating "between caricatured versions of femininity and feminism". She viewed the character as the epitome of conventional femininity during her relationships with Olaf and Xander, and as a caricature of a career-driven woman and radical feminist during her time as a vengeance demon. Levine argued that her decision to find an independent purpose in "Selfless" is a rejection of the postfeminist concept that a woman must choose between extremes of feminism and femininity.

Tamy Burnett and Lewis Call both highlighted Anya's romantic and sexual relationships. Burnett argued that Anya is the only sexually liberated female character in Buffy and "transgress[es] traditional forms of female sexuality", since she openly discusses and engages in sex without consequence. She cited the loss of Angel's soul after having sex with Buffy (Note: In "Surprise" and "Innocence", Buffy and her boyfriend, Angel, who is a 241-year-old vampire cursed with a soul, have sex for the first time. Because Angel achieves a moment of true happiness after having sex, the curse is broken, and he loses his soul.) and Tara's death (Note: Tara is killed in "Seeing Red". In the episode, she and Willow are portrayed in bed between sexual encounters, leading to critics accusing Whedon of implying that lesbian sex should be punishable by death, which is a trope in film and television.) among consequences faced by other female characters for their transgressions of traditional forms of gender performance. Similarly, Call maintained that Anya and Xander are the only couple in Buffy whose engagement in kink is presented in a positive light; he described their relationship as featuring "an astonishing amount of open, direct negotiation" and consensual BDSM-related practices, including spanking and bondage. He further contended that despite their romantic relationship ending in the sixth season, their interactions in the seventh season continue to reflect the structure and dynamics of a committed kinky relationship: "[S]exually, they are basically monogamous, though they do play with others." According to Burnett, Anya's acceptance within the Scooby Gang validates her views on sex, but her death positions her as "failing to achieve [her] ultimate narrative legitimacy".

The philosophy professor Carolyn Korsmeyer, writing in Buffy the Vampire Slayer and Philosophy, stated that Anya's love for Xander is mentioned but rarely felt by audiences. She argued that her limited human relations and emotional register lead to their "non-fungible" love lacking "a wider and more robust scope of affection somewhere in one's character and experience" to be credible. Contrastingly, Anthony Curtis Adler claimed that the directness in Anya's speech "give[s] voice to a human finitude, a fleshy, creaturely existence" and that her love "is purely sensual and yet absolutely faithful, and it is almost as if the human body itself, innocent of consciousness, was granted the gift of language".

== Reception ==
Several journalists praised Anya's third-season appearances. Vox's Emily St. James referred to her return in "Doppelgangland" as "endearing", and the BBC said that the episode positioned her as "a very promising character with an interesting history". In commentary on "The Prom", Mark Rabinowitz of Paste called her tactlessness "bizarre but endearing". Comments on later seasons were also positive. Several journalists singled out Anya's reaction to Joyce's death in "The Body", in which she tearfully refers to death as "mortal and stupid", as moving and poignant. (Note: Attributed to articles in TVLine, /Film, The A.V. Club, and The Baltimore Sun) The /Film writer Justin McDevitt opined that Anya's character development was "fascinating", commenting that her difficulties with understanding humans established her as one of the show's "most relatable" characters. Similarly, Emma McKenna, writing for ComicBook.com, said that her alienation from humanity was "sincere, complex, and surprisingly poignant" while highlighting it as the catalyst for some of Buffy's most humorous scenes.

Anya is a fan-favorite character from Buffy, which ComicBook.com's Shawn Lealos credited to her comedic aspects and Caulfield's "outstanding" performance. She has been ranked among the show's best characters by TVLine (7th) and ComicBook.com (9th). McDevitt listed her as its third-best main character, behind Spike and Buffy, and Rabinowitz described her character as "compelling[,] ... funny and lovable". Reviewing Caulfield's acting, The Guardian writer Lucy Mangan stated that her timing and pitch were "so perfect it seemed itself otherworldly". The BBC argued that her "always adorable" performance made her Buffy's "most watchable character", while Alan Sepinwall, writing for The Star-Ledger, said she was "one of the funniest evil creatures". David Odyssey of Nylon agreed, claiming that she offered Anya "fire and joie de vivre" that transformed her into "a layered, surprising character".

Journalists have commented on Anya's relationship with Xander. Lealos said she and Xander had "one of the best relationships" in the show, while BuzzFeed News's Alan White dubbed them the "greatest TV couple of all time". Articles in Nylon and Digital Spy ranked Anya and Xander as the 6th-best (of 12) and 11th-best (of 17) romantic relationship in the Buffyverse respectively. The former praised the couple's "sheer abundance of joy", whereas the latter disapprovingly opined that Xander fell for Anya accidentally and reluctantly. Sarah D. Bunting and Jack Francis, from Vulture and Rolling Stone respectively, criticized their breakup in "Hell's Bells", with the latter referring to the episode as the sixth season's "breaking point".

Anya's fate in the series finale drew mixed opinions. In commentary on "Selfless", Francis wrote that Anya's decision to establish her own identity and death contributed to her seventh-season development being "quietly one of the most compelling". McDevitt stated that her fate displayed her character growth, while McKenna said her death was "one of the most painful". Other writers, such as Kirsten Howard of Den of Geek, Morgan Jeffrey of Digital Spy, and Nick Caruso of TVLine, criticized her death as "unnecessary and mean-spirited", "ignoble", and "confounding", respectively. According to Mangan, her swift death scene "did a disservice to all that the characters had meant to us and each other". Caulfield referred to Anya's fate as "lame" and believed that it deserved a greater reaction from the other characters.
