= Pateman =

Pateman is an English surname. Notable people with the surname include:

- Carole Pateman (born 1940), English academic, political theorist and feminist
- Eric Pateman, Canadian chef
- George Pateman (1910–1973), English footballer
- John Arthur Joseph Pateman (1926–2011), English microbiologist and geneticist
- Matthew Pateman, English academic
- Matthew Pateman (singer), English singer and actor
- Robert Pateman (1856–?), Australian cricketer
- Steve Pateman, English banker
