= Olivier (comics) =

- Frank Costa (left) and Olivier (right) in The Punisher (vol. 4) #2 (December 1998); Art by Bernie Wrightson.

Publication information
- Publisher: Marvel Comics
- First appearance: Frank Costa: Marvel Super Action #1 (January 1976); Olivier: The Punisher (vol. 4) #1 (November 1998)
- Created by: Frank Costa: Tony DeZuniga; Archie Goodwin; Olivier: Bernie Wrightson; Christopher Golden; Thomas E. Sniegoski

In-story information
- Species: Demon
- Place of origin: Heaven
- Team affiliations: Hell-lords; Costa Family; Lucifer's Inner Circle
- Notable aliases: Frank Costa
- Abilities: Portal generation Hellfire projection Immunity to age, disease, and injuries Illusion creation and manipulation Ability to command lesser demons

Olivier is a supervillain appearing in American comic books published by Marvel Comics. The character is usually depicted as an enemy of the antihero the Punisher. Olivier was created by Bernie Wrightson, Christopher Golden and Thomas E. Sniegoski, and first appeared in The Punisher (vol. 4) #1 (November 1998) as a reimagined depiction of an already existing individual: Frank Costa was created by Tony DeZuniga and Archie Goodwin, and debuted in Marvel Super Action #1 (January 1976).

== Publication history ==
Frank Costa debuted in Marvel Super Action #1 as the head of the organized crime family responsible for the murder of Frank Castle's wife and children. The character was killed off-panel in that story, with his only appearance outside of it being in Issue #3 of the prequel miniseries The Punisher: Year One.

The Punisher (vol. 4) revealed the character was the human form of Olivier, a Hell-lord and the former prince of the Archangels. Olivier was present in all four issues of The Punisher (vol. 4) and went on to make cameo appearances in Nightcrawler (vol. 3) #1-3, and Journey into Mystery #627.

Olivier received profiles in Marvel Encyclopedia #5, All-New Official Handbook of the Marvel Universe #8, Marvel Zombies: The Book of Angels, Demons & Various Monstrosities #1 and Official Handbook of the Marvel Universe A-Z #8.

== Fictional character history ==
At some unspecified point in the past, there was a war in Heaven against God in which the demon Olivier sided with Lucifer and was cast out of paradise. Olivier eventually came to rule a portion of Hell but the other lords of Hell grew resentful of his ambition and they forced him into the body of a stillborn human infant. Olivier's spirit returned life to the infant, although he lost all memory of his life as a Hell-lord.

Olivier grew up as the human Frank Costa of the Costa crime family, an arm of the Maggia. As a petty criminal, he was working as a lookout one night when he shot and killed a mobster from a rival family. This act of taking a human life completely restored Costa's memory of his life as Olivier, and he started plotting his revenge on the other Lords of Hell that had placed him in his human body.

For decades, Olivier, still in his Costa identity, worked to become the Costa crime family's head. He used occultism and magic rituals to discover the existence of Frank Castle in the Vietnam War, deciding to use the American soldier as his instrument for revenge. When Castle returned to the United States, Olivier ordered his assassins to murder a mob banker in Central Park, knowing that Castle's wife and children would be caught in the crossfire and killed; what appeared to be a random act of violence was in fact deliberately planned. Their murders were the motivations for the Punisher whose victims would be forced into becoming undead servants of Olivier.

The Punisher then set about killing the assassins who had murdered the Castle family, one of whom was Bruno Costa, the brother of Olivier's host body and alter ego. The Punisher later discovered Frank dead of an icepick wound to the head, ostensibly administered by the prostitute Audrey whom the Punisher later killed. Unbeknownst to the Punisher, Audrey killing Costa released Olivier's soul which returned to his realm of Hell in its true form. Olivier claimed he had allowed Audrey to kill him as he hadn't wanted to wait to die of natural causes to return to Hell, and could not have committed suicide as that would have alerted the other Hell-lords to his return.

Olivier felt that the Punisher had gathered enough souls for him to launch an attack on the rest of Hell, and he caused the Punisher to despair over the lives taken by the Punisher. Castle was driven to suicide by Olivier's demonic servants, and he shot himself. Castle was then immediately resurrected by Gadriel, the guardian angel who had failed in Castle's defense. From his base in New York's Flatiron Building, Olivier sent his minions against Heaven's angels and the dominions of the other Lords of Hell, including Daimon Hellstrom, but was thwarted in his assassination attempt on Hellstrom by the Punisher and Gadriel. Olivier revealed to the Punisher that he was responsible for the deaths of the Punisher's family. The Punisher fought a reanimated Bruno Costa and the contact of the weapons of Heaven (the Punisher) and Hell (Bruno Costa) caused a dimensional portal to open through which the tentacles of Hell began to reach. The Punisher shot Olivier into the tentacles' embrace, and they immediately tore Olivier to pieces. The portal was sealed by Gadriel sacrificing his life.

Olivier later resurfaced allied to the demon Pazuzu and several other entities serving on the court of Lucifer that were trying to open a portal to Earth with the help of a coven of witches. They were thwarted by Nightcrawler, Seth Walker, and Magik.

The Egyptian deity Khonshu expressed interest in the Punisher, but was deterred from anointing him by the Punisher's connection to Olivier, remarking that the vigilante "belongs to another" and that he "flies his lord's banner" (the Punisher's skull insignia).

During the "Fear Itself" storyline, Olivier attended the Devil's Advocacy to discuss the Serpent's actions on Earth.

== Powers and abilities ==
As a demon and true fallen angel, Olivier is impervious to age, disease, and injuries that would kill an ordinary mortal. He also has the ability to create and manipulate illusions, shoot blasts of hellfire, and create portals to other dimensions. He also has the authority to command demons of a lesser degree. Olivier claims to be one of the most powerful lords of hell, approximately on the same level as Mephisto.

== In other media ==
=== Film ===
- "Costa" was the initial name of the crime family that massacred the Castle family in Punisher (2004) before it was later changed to "Saint".
- The Costa crime family makes a cameo appearance in Punisher: War Zone, led by Antonio Costa.

=== Video games ===
- The Costa crime family makes a cameo appearance in The Punisher (1990).
- The Costa crime family, led by Bruno, appears in The Punisher (1993).
- The Costa crime family, led by Don Costa, appears in Spider-Man via the "Turf Wars" DLC.
