= Joe Golem =

Novel and comic book series created by Mike Mignola and Christopher Golden

- The cover for St. Martin's Press release of the original novel
- Date: March 27, 2012 (novel); November 4, 2015 – October 2, 2019 (comics)
- Publisher: St. Martin's Press, Dark Horse Comics

Creative team
- Writers: Mike Mignola; Christopher Golden
- Artists: Mike Mignola (novel); Patric Reynolds (#1–10); Peter Bergting (#11–20)
- Letterer: Clem Robins
- Colorist: Dave Stewart (#1–10); Michelle Madsen (#11–20)
- Editor: Scott Allie; Katii O'Brien

Original publication
- Language: English

Joe Golem is a novel and comic book series created by Mike Mignola and Christopher Golden. It began with a promotional short story, Joe Golem and the Copper Girl, followed by an illustrated novel, Joe Golem and the Drowning City in 2012, both published by St. Martin's Press. The series was expanded as a comic book series published by Dark Horse Comics from 2015 to 2019. The series follows Joe, an occult detective in New York City during the 1960s and '70s. The Joe Golem series is set in The Outerverse, a shared universe with Baltimore (a 2007 novel by Mignola and Golden and its comic book continuation), and other series.

== Comics ==
In 2015 Dark Horse Comics began the comic series Joe Golem: Occult Detective. The first ten issues were set in the decade preceding the events of the original novel, while the next ten retell the novel. Joe Golem is a series of miniseries, with each miniseries having its own numbering, but each issue also has an ongoing overall numbering on the inside front cover.

=== Issues ===
Number in series	Issue	Release date	Arc	Story	Art	Colors	Cover
1	#1	November 4, 2015	The Rat Catcher	Mike Mignola and Christopher Golden	Patric Reynolds	Dave Stewart	Dave Palumbo
2	#2	December 2, 2015	The Rat Catcher	Mike Mignola and Christopher Golden	Patric Reynolds	Dave Stewart	Dave Palumbo
3	#3	January 6, 2016	The Rat Catcher	Mike Mignola and Christopher Golden	Patric Reynolds	Dave Stewart	Dave Palumbo
4	#1	February 3, 2016	The Sunken Dead	Mike Mignola and Christopher Golden	Patric Reynolds	Dave Stewart	Dave Palumbo
5	#2	March 2, 2016	The Sunken Dead	Mike Mignola and Christopher Golden	Patric Reynolds	Dave Stewart	Dave Palumbo
6	#1	May 31, 2017	The Outer Dark	Mike Mignola and Christopher Golden	Patric Reynolds	Dave Stewart	Dave Palumbo
7	#2	June 28, 2017	The Outer Dark	Mike Mignola and Christopher Golden	Patric Reynolds	Dave Stewart	Dave Palumbo
8	#3	July 26, 2017	The Outer Dark	Mike Mignola and Christopher Golden	Patric Reynolds	Dave Stewart	Dave Palumbo
9	#1	December 20, 2017	Flesh and Blood	Mike Mignola and Christopher Golden	Patric Reynolds	Dave Stewart	Dave Palumbo
10	#2	January 31, 2018	Flesh and Blood	Mike Mignola and Christopher Golden	Patric Reynolds	Dave Stewart	Dave Palumbo
11	#1	September 12, 2018	The Drowning City	Mike Mignola and Christopher Golden	Peter Bergting	Michelle Madsen	Dave Palumbo
12	#2	October 10, 2018	The Drowning City	Mike Mignola and Christopher Golden	Peter Bergting	Michelle Madsen	Dave Palumbo
13	#3	November 14, 2018	The Drowning City	Mike Mignola and Christopher Golden	Peter Bergting	Michelle Madsen	Dave Palumbo
14	#4	December 12, 2018	The Drowning City	Mike Mignola and Christopher Golden	Peter Bergting	Michelle Madsen	Dave Palumbo
15	#5	January 9, 2019	The Drowning City	Mike Mignola and Christopher Golden	Peter Bergting	Michelle Madsen	Dave Palumbo
16	#1	May 15, 2019	The Conjurors	Mike Mignola and Christopher Golden	Peter Bergting	Michelle Madsen	Dave Palumbo
17	#2	June 12, 2019	The Conjurors	Mike Mignola and Christopher Golden	Peter Bergting	Michelle Madsen	Dave Palumbo
18	#3	July 17, 2019	The Conjurors	Mike Mignola and Christopher Golden	Peter Bergting	Michelle Madsen	Dave Palumbo
19	#4	August 14, 2019	The Conjurors	Mike Mignola and Christopher Golden	Peter Bergting	Michelle Madsen	Dave Palumbo
20	#5	October 2, 2019	The Conjurors	Mike Mignola and Christopher Golden	Peter Bergting	Michelle Madsen	Dave Palumbo

=== Collected editions ===
The comic book series has been collected in hardcover volumes.

Volume	Title	Collects	Special features	Published	ISBN
1	The Rat Catcher and The Sunken Dead	The Rat Catcher; The Sunken Dead	10-page sketchbook	July 20, 2016	9781616559649
2	The Outer Dark	The Outer Dark; Flesh and Blood	10-page sketchbook	May 23, 2018	9781506703954
3	The Drowning City	The Drowning City	10-page sketchbook	June 19, 2019	9781506709451
4	The Conjurors	The Conjurors	10-page sketchbook	February 26, 2020	9781506714134

Furthermore, in October 2022 the whole series was collected in one hardcover book, the Joe Golem: Occult Detective Omnibus (ISBN 9781506729084) with 536 pages including the back matter with covers and a sketchbook.
