= Ben Stenbeck =

Comic book creator from New Zealand

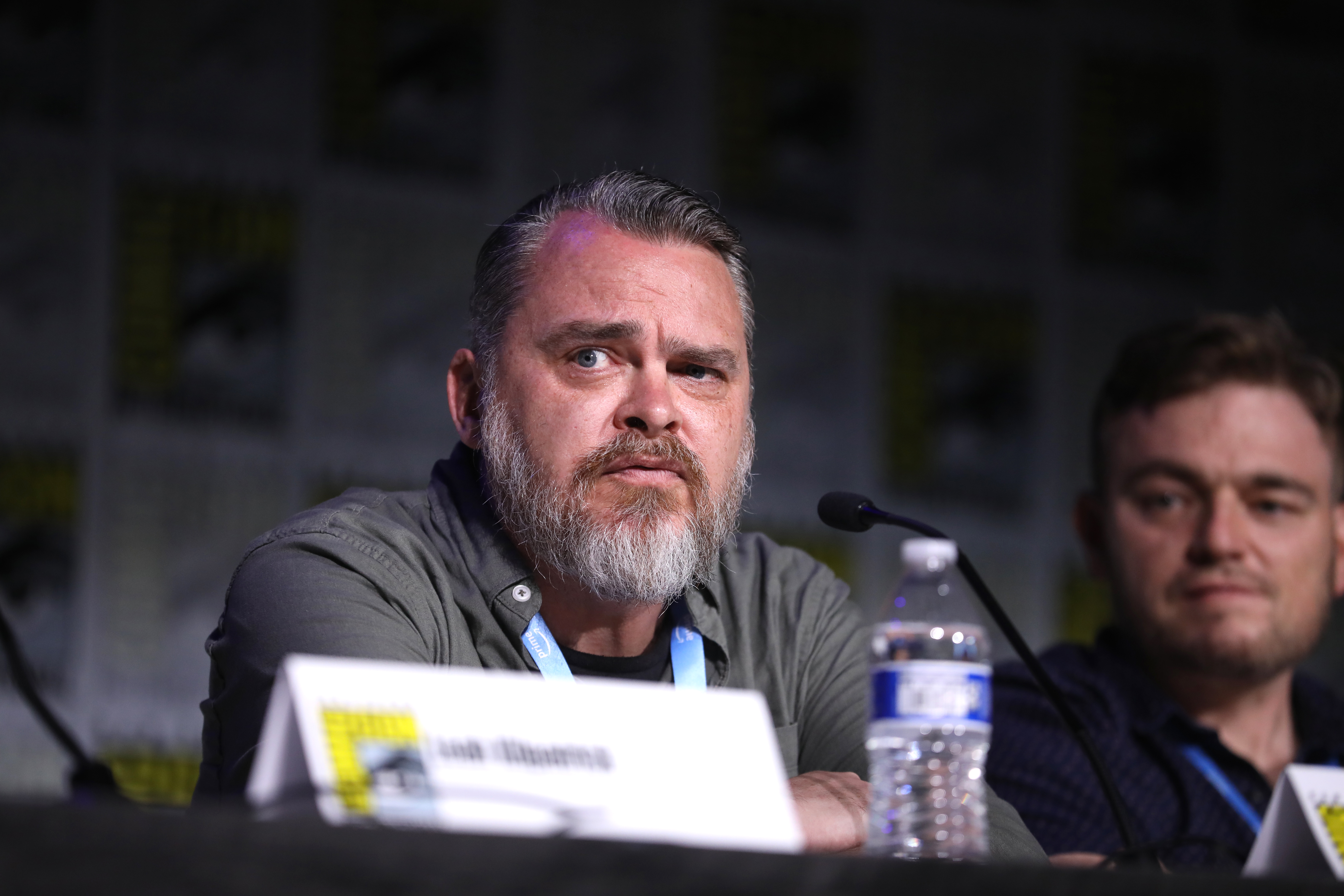
- Stenbeck in 2023
- Areas: Cartoonist, Artist
- Notable works: Baltimore; Sir Edward Grey: Witchfinder; Koshchei; Hellboy; Our Bones Dust

Ben Stenbeck is a New Zealand comic book creator, primarily an artist. He has frequently collaborated with Mike Mignola on stories for the Baltimore series and the Hellboy Universe, and co-created the Lands Unknown series with him.

== Career ==
He started his comic book career in 2003 when he illustrated a short Buffy the Vampire Slayer comic book story in the anthology Tales of the Vampires for Dark Horse Comics. In 2008, he made his Hellboy Universe debut when he illustrated a B.P.R.D. one-shot, The Ectoplasmic Man. Since then he has worked on several titles for the Hellboy Universe including Sir Edward Grey: Witchfinder, Frankenstein Underground, Koshchei, and Hellboy.

In 2010, Mike Mignola and writer Christopher Golden chose Stenbeck to illustrate the comic book adaptation of their novel, Baltimore, or, The Steadfast Tin Soldier and the Vampire. He continued working on Baltimore over the next five years with his final story, The Wolf and the Apostle, coming out in late 2014.

Image Comics published his first creator owned comic, Our Bones Dust in 2023. As a first-time writer, he focused on telling the story through the art with long stretches of silence. In January 2025, the Lands Unknown series he co-created with Mike Mignola will be debuting in Bowling with Corpses & Other Strange Tales from Lands Unknown from Dark Horse Comics.

He also worked as a concept artist on video games and films, being part of the design department of Peter Jackson's The Lord of the Rings movies. In 2005, he directed a short film called Zombie Movie.

== Bibliography ==
=== Art ===
- "Antique" (Dark Horse Comics, with Drew Goddard in Tales of the Vampires, 2003)
- Living With The Dead #1–3 (Dark Horse Comics, with Mike Richardson, 2007)
- Hellboy Universe (Dark Horse Comics):
  - Hellboy Animated: The Yearning (with Jim Pascoe, 2007)
  - B.P.R.D.: The Ectoplasmic Man (with John Arcudi and Mike Mignola, 2008)
  - Sir Edward Grey: Witchfinder:
    - "Murderous Intent" (with Mike Mignola in Dark Horse Presents #16, 2008)
    - In the Service of Angels #1–5 (with Mike Mignola, 2009)
    - "Beware the Ape" (with Mike Mignola in Dark Horse Presents #36, 2014)
    - City of the Dead #1–5 (with Chris Roberson and Mike Mignola, 2016)
  - Hellboy and the B.P.R.D.:
    - 1953: The Phantom Hand & The Kelpie (with Mike Mignola, 2015)
    - 1953: The Witch Tree & Rawhead and Bloody Bones (with Mike Mignola, 2015)
  - Frankenstein:
    - Frankenstein Underground #1–5 (with Mike Mignola, 2015)
    - Frankenstein Undone #1–2 (with Scott Allie and Mike Mignola, 2020)
  - Lobster Johnson: Mangekyō (with John Arcudi and Mike Mignola, 2017)
  - Koshchei:
    - Koshchei the Deathless #1–6 (with Mike Mignola, 2018)
    - Koshchei in Hell #1–4 (with Mike Mignola, 2023)
  - Hellboy:
    - "Return of the Lambton Worm" (with Mike Mignola, 2018, for Playboy magazine)
    - "Happy New Year, Ava Galluci" (with Mike Mignola in Hellboy Winter Special (2018), 2018)
    - The Silver Lantern Club #1–5 (with Christopher Mitten, Chris Roberson and Mike Mignola, 2021)
- Marvel Comics Presents Vol. 2, #12: Man-Thing—Dirty Work (Marvel Comics, with Jai Nitz, 2008)
- Baltimore (Dark Horse Comics):
  - The Plague Ships #1–5 (with Christopher Golden and Mike Mignola, 2010)
  - "A Passing Stranger" (with Christopher Golden and Mike Mignola for Free Comic Book Day, 2011)
  - The Curse Bells #1–5 (with Christopher Golden and Mike Mignola, 2011)
  - Dr. Leskovar's Remedy #1–2 (with Christopher Golden and Mike Mignola, 2012)
  - The Play (with Christopher Golden and Mike Mignola, 2012)
  - The Widow and the Tank (with Christopher Golden and Mike Mignola, 2013)
  - The Inquisitor #1–3 (with Christopher Golden and Mike Mignola, 2013)
  - The Infernal Train #1–2 (with Christopher Golden and Mike Mignola, 2013)
  - Chapel of Bones (with Christopher Golden and Mike Mignola, 2014)
  - The Wolf and the Apostle #1–2 (with Christopher Golden and Mike Mignola, 2014)
  - "Monstrous" (with Christopher Golden and Mike Mignola in Baltimore Omnibus Volume Two, 2020)

=== Writing and art ===
- Our Bones Dust #1–4 (Image Comics, 2023)

=== Writing ===
- "Feeder" (Dark Horse Comics, with Matt Smith in Headless Horseman Halloween Annual (2024))

== Awards ==
=== Nominations ===
- 2011 Eisner Award for Best Limited Series (for Baltimore: The Plague Ships)
