= The Punisher (1998 series) =

1998 Marvel Comics limited series

- The cover of The Punisher (1998), #3 (January 1999). Art by Joe Jusko and Bernie Wrightson.

Publication information
- Publisher: Marvel Comics; Marvel Knights
- Schedule: Monthly
- Format: Limited series
- Genre: Superhero; Dark fantasy
- Publication date: November 1998 - February 1999
- No. of issues: 4
- Main character(s): Olivier; Gadriel; Punisher

Creative team
- Written by: Christopher Golden; Thomas E. Sniegoski
- Penciller: Bernie Wrightson
- Inker: Jimmy Palmiotti
- Letterer: Richard Starkings
- Colorist(s): Brian Haberlin (Issues #1-2); Elizabeth Lewis (Issues #3-4)
- Editor(s): Joe Quesada; Jimmy Palmiotti

The Punisher, also known as The Punisher: Purgatory, is a four-issue comic book limited series written by Christopher Golden and Thomas E. Sniegoski, illustrated by Bernie Wrightson, and published by Marvel Comics (through the Marvel Knights imprint) from 1998 to 1999. The series was a departure from typical Punisher stories in that it dealt with supernatural themes.

== Plot ==
Following Frank Castle's suicide, the alley where he took his own life became a shrine for all the downtrodden victims of crime. Nevertheless, a figure with glowing eyes and an arcane symbol on his forehead has been performing deeds similar to those of the Punisher. Gradually, this phantom starts to recall his identity, eventually uncovering not only the compulsion that drives him but also the guardian angel who failed to save his family.

== Prints ==
=== Issues ===
1. "Purgatory, Part 1: The Harvest"
2. "Purgatory, Part 2: The Mark of Cain"
3. "Purgatory, Part 3: A Gathering of Angels"
4. "Purgatory, Part 4: The Hour of Judgment"

== Continuity ==
The angelic rendition of the Punisher reappears in the four-issue miniseries Wolverine/The Punisher: Revelation.

In The Punisher series following this one, the character has gone back to being a mortal vigilante combating mundane criminals; the return to the status quo is explained via the Punisher commenting that he had grown weary of doing Heaven's bidding (referring to the offer made to him at the end of the aforementioned Revelation) and had quit its employ after telling the angels "where to stick it".

The Egyptian deity Khonshu expressed interest in the Punisher, but was deterred from anointing him by the Punisher's connection to Olivier, remarking that the vigilante "belongs to another" and that he "flies his lord's banner" (the Punisher's skull insignia). Later, while a member of the Thunderbolts, the Punisher is healed by an angel's feather after being fatally wounded. When Deadpool asks why the feather was drawn to him, the Punisher snaps, "I don't want to talk about it".

The series retcons the events in Marvel Super Action #1, which had the Costa brothers die at the hands of an assassin named Audrey, not the Punisher. Additionally, Olivier insinuates that his own skull-like face inspired the Punisher's emblem, when it had earlier been implied in The 'Nam that the inspiration for the symbol came from a Viet Cong sniper called Monkey.

== Reception ==
The comic has been ridiculed for its revamping of the Punisher mythos, with Matt Duarte of The Weekly Crisis musing that it "alienated many readers and made the character toxic until Garth Ennis engineered his revival some years later". Nick Nadel of ComicsAlliance wrote, "Even horror legend Bernie Wrightson's artwork couldn't make Angel Punisher and his weird spiky guns not look completely silly and dated". Cracked.com's Maxwell Yezpitelok opined that the storyline "completely undermined the intent of the character who had the simplest goal of any superhero ever" and that it felt like "the sort of bullshit premise that could have only come from the mind of a coke-fueled TV executive pitching a toy-friendly Punisher animated series where they don't actually show him killing people". Ethan Kaye of Topless Robot succinctly stated in regards to the volume, "Thank God we have Garth Ennis to give us back the Punisher who liked guns and bombs again". 4thletter's Gavin Jasper said, "Purgatory still doesn't get as much hate as it deserves. Angel Punisher isn't a completely unusable idea. As a fan of Franken-Castle, I'd be a hypocrite for suggesting such a thing. If Ennis felt like it, I'm sure he could come up with a way to make it work. Remender and Ostrander (the last guy to write Punisher before this status quo) could make it work. Here, though, there's nothing that redeems such a bonehead concept."

Chuck Dixon, writer of various Punisher comics throughout the early 1990s, criticized the alterations made to the character's backstory, asserting, "I don't think origins like Batman's or Punisher's should be visited over and over again with everyone adding their two cents until the sum of all added details don't fit any more" and "Punisher's origin has been similarly screwed up, changing in the identities of his family's killers, making it a purposeful rather than random act".
