= The Wish (Buffy the Vampire Slayer) =

- Buffy the Vampire Slayer episode
- Episode no.: Season 3 Episode 9
- Directed by: David Greenwalt
- Written by: Marti Noxon
- Production code: 3ABB09
- Original air date: December 8, 1998

Guest appearances
- Mark Metcalf as The Master; Emma Caulfield as Anya/Anyanka; Larry Bagby III as Larry Blaisdell; Mercedes McNab as Harmony Kendall; Danny Strong as Jonathan Levinson; Nicole Bilderback as Cordette #1; Nathan Anderson as John Lee; Mariah O'Brien as Nancy; Gary Imhoff as Teacher; Robert Covarrubias as Caretaker

Episode chronology
← Previous "Lovers Walk"	Next → "Amends"
- Buffy the Vampire Slayer season 3

"The Wish" is the ninth episode of season three of Buffy the Vampire Slayer. It was written by Marti Noxon, directed by David Greenwalt, and first broadcast on The WB on December 8, 1998.

Although a standalone episode, "The Wish" is considered one of the best episodes of the show.

== Plot ==
Cordelia returns to school only to be rejected by Harmony and her former clique, who taunt her as "Xander's castoff". She goes to The Bronze where Buffy accidentally humiliates her further by knocking her into a pile of trash in front of her friends. Cordelia decides that Buffy is to blame for her predicament.

The next day, new girl Anya gives Cordelia an amulet while trying to goad her into wishing something bad would happen to Xander. Instead Cordelia wishes that Buffy had never come to Sunnydale. Anya immediately transforms into Anyanka, the vengeance demon of scorned and wronged women, and grants the wish.

Cordelia is once again popular in school, her Cordettes are at her beck and call, and handsome jock John Lee wants to date her. Her happiness is short lived when she realises that the town is overrun by vampires. The Master has risen and created a vast army of vampires, which terrorize the surviving humans. Most of the students are either dead or vampires and there is a nighttime curfew. Walking through the streets at night Cordelia encounters Xander and Willow, who are now aggressive, capricious vampires. She is saved by a group of vampire fighters led by Giles. Cordelia tries to explain to Giles what happened and asks to have Buffy back so that things could be the way they were; but, before she can elaborate, she is killed by Xander and Willow.

Giles calls Buffy's contacts in Cleveland but is able only to leave a message for the very busy Slayer. He learns that the amulet Cordelia was wearing is that of Anyanka, whose granted wishes can be undone only if her center of power is destroyed.

The Master has created machinery to industrialize harvesting of blood from captive humans. Giles, on his way home, is nearly captured by vampires who are rounding up humans for the plant; he is rescued by Buffy, the slayer, who in this reality is cold and cynical. She doubts that Giles can reverse Anya's spell, but does offer to kill the Master. Buffy finds Angel imprisoned; when she sees that he is a vampire, she initially rejects his help, but the marks of torture on his chest persuade her that he is no friend of the Master.

The Master starts up the plant with the first human victim before a cage of prisoners, including Oz and Larry. Buffy and Angel attack the vampires. During the battle, Xander kills Angel, Buffy kills Xander, Oz kills Willow, and the Master breaks Buffy's neck.

Meanwhile, Giles uses a spell to summon Anyanka to his house. He guesses that Anyanka's own amulet is the center of her powers and smashes it, restoring the original reality. Cordelia once again makes the wish and Anyanka tries to grant it, but without her amulet she is powerless.

== Cultural references ==
Mike Loschiavo notes, "Most good genre series play with the idea of a parallel timeline. Star Trek might be one of the earliest of the big franchises to do it with "Mirror, Mirror." Deep Space Nine, Enterprise and Discovery have all visited that same timeline all to varying degrees of success. Doctor Who gave us our first taste with "Inferno" and in the modern era, "The Rise of the Cybermen." Perhaps Doctor Who's most profound alternate timeline episode however is "Turn Left," where we see what happened to the world without the Doctor there to save us."

== Reception ==
Vox ranked it at #10 on their "Every Episode Ranked From Worst to Best" list, writing, "Plunging a show into a parallel universe is bold. Plunging a show into a parallel universe in which everyone we love dies by the end of the episode is some next-level trolling... It might be a bit hyperbolic, but everything from Vampire Willow playing with Angel as her 'puppy' to the episode's desperate showdown between Giles and Anya is just too gripping for us to care."

Paste Magazine, in a similar list, ranked it at #9 and said it "packs one of the strongest emotional wallops of the series. The alternate reality is predictably nightmarish and The Master's assembly line of bloodletting is horrific, but watching our heroes kill each other over and over again is brutal. The real genius in this episode is who kills whom and how it relates to the real world: Xander and Willow, the pair that essentially caused this brutal alternate reality in 'Lover's Walk,' drain Cordelia, one of the injured parties; Xander kills Angel, the vampire he never truly trusted; Buffy in turn avenges her alt.lover by staking Xander, while Oz kills Willow. Finally, The Master snaps Buffy's neck. The last five minutes are like watching all your friends die. It's exceedingly tough to watch, but no less marvelous as a work of art."

Rhonda Wilcox and David Lavery described "The Wish" as "one of the darkest of Buffy episodes. The moment Vamp Xander and Vamp Willow kill Cordelia—without remorse and with visible pleasure—the tone of the episode shifts, climaxing in the scene where the cast regulars are killed in slow motion and with haunting music underneath."

Matthew Pateman praised the performance of Mark Metcalf as the Master. He also points out the satire involved in the Master's plan to mechanize the draining of blood, its implicit criticism of progress through mass production, and the script's reference to Aldous Huxley's novel Brave New World where such themes are explored.

Lewis Call said the episode was a "multi-signifying masterpiece". In "Bewitched, Bothered and Bewildered", an earlier episode also written by Marti Noxon, a love-struck Willow responds to Xander's threat to use force with an enthusiastic "Force is OK!" Call writes that this indicates a character trait in Willow that is brought to the fore in "The Wish" where she is portrayed as polymorphously perverse and sadomasochistic.

Roger Pocock writes, "Sci-fi and fantasy are genres that are joined at the hip, so the idea easily translates to the Buffy universe, with a wish being granted so that history has followed a different course. By necessity we never quite get a punchline to this. ... Although it’s slightly frustrating that Cordelia never learns how much better life is with Buffy around, it’s doubly frustrating that Buffy never learns that either."

Jennifer Armstrong of Rolling Stone singled out The Wish as the 8th best episode of the show.
