= Korsmeyer =

Korsmeyer is a surname. Notable people with the surname include:

- Carolyn Korsmeyer (born 1950), author and professor of philosophy
- Stanley J. Korsmeyer (1950–2005), American oncologist
