= Talent (comics) =

- Cover to Talent #1 (May 2006). Art by Paul Azaceta.

Publication information
- Publisher: Boom! Studios
- Schedule: Monthly
- Format: Mini-series
- Publication date: May–October 2006
- No. of issues: 4

Creative team
- Written by: Christopher Golden; Tom Sniegoski
- Artist: Paul Azaceta
- Letterer: Marshall Dillon
- Colorist: Ron Riley
- Editor: Marshall Dillon

Collected editions
- Talent: ISBN 1-934506-05-2

Talent is a comic book series written by Christopher Golden and Tom Sniegoski, drawn by Paul Azaceta, published by Boom! Studios.

== Plot ==
A college professor, Nicholas Dane is the only survivor of flight 654, a plane that crashes into the sea and kills the crew and 148 other passengers. Unable to account for how he was able to survive underwater for 12 hours, he is suspected of involvement in the incident. Fleeing as a fugitive, Dane finds that he now possesses the talents of the other passengers and crew and must evade members of a shadowy conspiracy out to get him.

== Collected editions ==
The series has been collected as a trade paperback:

- Talent (128 pages, September 2007, Boom! Studios, ISBN 1-934506-05-2)

== Adaptation ==
On May 13, 2011, the film rights were optioned by Universal Studios via producers Marc E. Platt, Ross Richie and Andrew Crosby (the latter two being BOOM! Studios' cofounders) and Zack Whedon, brother to Joss Whedon, set to write the screenplay. On February 13, 2017, Neal H. Moritz’s company Original Film took over the film adaptation from Platt and won’t use Zack’s script. On February 6, 2019, Moritz moved the project to Sony Pictures Television, which got a straight-to-series order from Fox and Graham Yost set as the showrunner.
