= Baltimore (comics) =

Horror comic book series by Mike Mignola and Christopher Golden

- The cover for Dark Horse's release of the novel in paperback
- Date: August 28, 2007 – June 7, 2017
- Publisher: Bantam Spectra, Dark Horse Comics

Creative team
- Writers: Mike Mignola; Christopher Golden
- Artists: Mike Mignola (novel); Ben Stenbeck (#1–20, #24–25); Peter Bergting (#21–23, #26–41)
- Letterer: Clem Robins
- Colorist: Dave Stewart (#1–30); Michelle Madsen (#31–41)
- Editor: Scott Allie

Original publication
- Language: English

Baltimore is an American horror comic book series created by Mike Mignola and Christopher Golden. The series originally began with an illustrated novel, Baltimore, or, The Steadfast Tin Soldier and the Vampire in 2007. It followed the story of Lord Baltimore's hunt of the vampire Haigus as told by his three friends, Doctor Lemuel Rose, Thomas Childress Jr., and Demetrius Aischros. The series is a part of Mignola and Golden's Outerverse, a shared universe with Joe Golem and other titles such as Lady Baltimore.

== Comics ==
In 2010 Dark Horse Comics began the comic series Baltimore, following Lord Baltimore's hunt for Haigus during the years the original novel skipped over. From the fifth volume onward, the comic's story has moved beyond the events of the original novel.

Baltimore is a series of miniseries, with each miniseries having its own numbering, but each issue also has an ongoing overall numbering on the inside front cover.

=== Issues ===
Number in Series	Issue	Release date	Arc	Story	Art	Colors	Cover
1	#1	August 4, 2010	The Plague Ships	Mike Mignola and Christopher Golden	Ben Stenbeck	Dave Stewart	Mike Mignola
2	#2	September 1, 2010	The Plague Ships	Mike Mignola and Christopher Golden	Ben Stenbeck	Dave Stewart	Mike Mignola
3	#3	October 6, 2010	The Plague Ships	Mike Mignola and Christopher Golden	Ben Stenbeck	Dave Stewart	Mike Mignola
4	#4	November 3, 2010	The Plague Ships	Mike Mignola and Christopher Golden	Ben Stenbeck	Dave Stewart	Mike Mignola
5	#5	December 1, 2010	The Plague Ships	Mike Mignola and Christopher Golden	Ben Stenbeck	Dave Stewart	Mike Mignola
France, August, 1916: Lord Henry Baltimore follows the trail of his nemesis, the vampire Haigus, to a coastal village of Villefranche, where he is arrested by the suspicious local authorities, who summon an inquisitor to interrogate him. Baltimore is freed by a young woman, Vanessa, who insists that he take her with him when he escapes the town. Their ship is attacked at sea and they are stranded on an island filled with derelict ships. When the corpses of the ships' crews rise up to attack them, Baltimore locks Vanessa inside a wrecked U-boat and holds off the horde of revenants until dawn. Vanessa chooses to return home, not knowing that the inquisitor, Judge Duvic, has arrived and is torturing her grandmother to learn Baltimore's whereabouts. NB Includes several scenes from the novel Baltimore, or, The Steadfast Tin Soldier and the Vampire in flashback as Baltimore recounts parts of his story.
36	FCBD 2011	May 7, 2011	A Passing Stranger	Mike Mignola and Christopher Golden	Ben Stenbeck	Dave Stewart	Mike Mignola
Germany, October, 1916: When Baltimore passes through the village of Tülingart at night, unmolested, a young boy, Maxie, takes it as proof that the vampires are gone, and convinces his best friend, Rolf, to come outside and see for himself. Rolf is lured under a bridge and almost devoured by gigantic spiders, before Baltimore appears and saves him, killing the spiders and Maxie, who has turned into one of them. Baltimore confirms that the vampires are gone, but the plague has drawn all manner of evil creatures out of hiding. NOTE: Christopher Golden wanted to retroactively acknowledge the story in the numbering, so this 2011 FCBD issue is 36 in Number in Series.
6	#1	August 10, 2011	The Curse Bells	Mike Mignola and Christopher Golden	Ben Stenbeck	Dave Stewart	Mike Mignola; VARIANT: Francesco Francavilla
7	#2	September 14, 2011	The Curse Bells	Mike Mignola and Christopher Golden	Ben Stenbeck	Dave Stewart	Mike Mignola
8	#3	October 12, 2011	The Curse Bells	Mike Mignola and Christopher Golden	Ben Stenbeck	Dave Stewart	Mike Mignola
9	#4	November 9, 2011	The Curse Bells	Mike Mignola and Christopher Golden	Ben Stenbeck	Dave Stewart	Mike Mignola
10	#5	December 14, 2011	The Curse Bells	Mike Mignola and Christopher Golden	Ben Stenbeck	Dave Stewart	Mike Mignola
Lucerne, Switzerland, October, 1916: Baltimore meets American war correspondent Simon Hodge, who was fired from The Boston Globe after insisting that vampires were the cause of the plague. They go to a convent where Haigus is held prisoner by nuns (now vampires), in the service of an occultist (Adolf Hitler) who promised to cure them. The occultist uses Haigus's blood to resurrect Helena Blavatsky, who is "birthed" as a homunculus. In exchange for resurrecting her, the occultist demands that she place a curse on the convent's bells so that all who hear them will become his slaves. When Baltimore reveals to the nuns there is no cure for their vampirism, they turn on the occultist and tear him apart. The nuns kneel in the courtyard and wait for death by the rising sun. Meanwhile, Judge Duvic continues pursuing Baltimore, torturing and sometimes killing several of the people Baltimore has encountered.
11	#1	June 20, 2012	Dr. Leskovar's Remedy	Mike Mignola and Christopher Golden	Ben Stenbeck	Dave Stewart	Ben Stenbeck; VARIANT: Mike Mignola
12	#2	July 18, 2012	Dr. Leskovar's Remedy	Mike Mignola and Christopher Golden	Ben Stenbeck	Dave Stewart	Ben Stenbeck
Croatia, May, 1917: While fighting a monstrous creature in mid flight, Baltimore crashes near a makeshift fishing settlement. The locals have abandoned their village to escape Dr. Leskovar, who tried to develop a cure for vampirism, but only succeeded in creating mutated creatures, which he sent out to capture more "subjects" to perfect his cure. Baltimore needs to pass through the village to pick up Haigus's trail, but his conscience won't let him ignore the threat Dr. Leskovar poses. Leskovar drinks a formula that turns him into a monstrous creature so that he can hunt down and destroy all of his creations. Leskovar and Baltimore run back to the fishing camp, where crabs that ate the remains of the monster that crashed Baltimore's plane have mutated. They fight off the mutant crabs, but Leskovar is dragged underwater and drowns.
13	#1	November 21, 2012	The Play	Mike Mignola and Christopher Golden	Ben Stenbeck	Dave Stewart	Ben Stenbeck
Verona, Italy, January, 1917: Haigus is working on set paintings for play, La Morte Rossa Trionfante, by theatrical director named Gnecco with lyrics by the severed head of Edgar Allan Poe. All three men are in love with the play's star, Isabella. When Haigus realizes that Isabella is an immortal Muse, he breaks her hold over him, killing Gnecco and burning the theatre down. Meanwhile, Isabella escapes with Poe's head. A week later, Baltimore passes through, and the remaining members of the theatre troupe, now vampires, emerge from hiding to prey on the town.
14	#1	February 20, 2013	The Widow and the Tank	Mike Mignola and Christopher Golden	Ben Stenbeck	Dave Stewart	Ben Stenbeck
The Widow – England, June, 1916: Baltimore visits the wife of an old Army comrade in Lincolnshire, who insists her husband is dead. At night, the woman's husband, now a vampire, leaves the house to prey on the townspeople. After confirming that he does not know Haigus's whereabouts, Baltimore dispatches him, then confronts the widow. Seeing that she has been recently turned herself, Baltimore invites her to open the curtains and view the sunrise, which incinerates her. The Tank – France, July, 1916: Stopping for a meal in a small village in Aquitaine, Baltimore learns of a monster supposedly hiding in a derelict tank left in the middle of a field. Baltimore confronts the monster, a vampire hiding from worse monsters—goblin-like creatures that rise out of the earth and try to devour Baltimore. With the goblins distracted, the vampire attempts to escape, but is caught. Baltimore kills all the goblin creatures and the now half-eaten vampire.
15	#1	June 19, 2013	The Inquisitor	Mike Mignola and Christopher Golden	Ben Stenbeck	Dave Stewart	Ben Stenbeck
Austria-Hungary September, 1917: Inquisitor Judge Duvic arrives in Sarajevo town to interrogate Simon Hodge for Baltimore's whereabouts. Duvic relates how he was raised as a priest and trained to be an inquisitor by the Church, in response to the vampire plague. He believes Baltimore is tainted by the plague. The interrogation is interrupted when Vanessa (from The Plague Ships) appears in the cell and attacks Duvic, revenge for her grandmother's murder. After Duvic kills her, Hodge furiously challenges his righteousness when Duvic could have easily disarmed her. Shaken, Duvic allows Hodge to leave. Hodge tells him Baltimore will be in Budapest in three weeks' time, and afterward sends a letter to Baltimore, inviting him to deal with a true "monster."
16	#1	September 4, 2013	The Infernal Train	Mike Mignola and Christopher Golden	Ben Stenbeck	Dave Stewart	Ben Stenbeck
17	#2	October 16, 2013	The Infernal Train	Mike Mignola and Christopher Golden	Ben Stenbeck	Dave Stewart	Ben Stenbeck
18	#3	November 6, 2013	The Infernal Train	Mike Mignola and Christopher Golden	Ben Stenbeck	Dave Stewart	Ben Stenbeck
Budapest, Hungary, October, 1917: Baltimore arrives, intending to keep his rendezvous with Judge Duvic. By enforcing strict quarantine measures, the city authorities believe they have succeeded in creating a sanctuary from the plague. A mysterious woman, Signora Fulcanelli, claims to have invented a furnace hot enough to safely incinerate all of the plague's victims. Baltimore spies on her at night, but is distracted by the arrival of Judge Duvic and the two fight. They are interrupted by a swarm of newly created vampires, and Fulcanelli's men take Baltimore prisoner. Fulcanelli is housing a coven of elder vampires—the "high priests" of the Red King, the ancient deity that created the vampires—and collecting plague victims to burn as a beacon to hasten the King's reawakening. Haigus is the eldest of these high priests, but like all of their kind, he had grown savage and apathetic as humanity developed and forgot to worship the Red King, until Baltimore awoke his consciousness on the Ardennes battlefield. Baltimore breaks free and destroys the train's boiler, killing the vampire priests and causing the train to derail. Fulcanelli is trapped on the riverbank by a spike of metal impaled through her shoulder. She confesses to Baltimore that Haigus is headed to London, but he leaves her to die, unable to escape the rising river as it is swelled by a rainstorm. Duvic confronts Baltimore, who stabs him in the chest with a crucifix just as Duvic shoots him in the heart, seemingly without wounding him. After Baltimore leaves, a group of priests gather up Duvic's body and administer last rites, only for Duvic to re-animate as a werewolf and kill all of them.
19	#1	December 31, 2013	Chapel of Bones	Mike Mignola and Christopher Golden	Ben Stenbeck	Dave Stewart	Ben Stenbeck
20	#2	February 5, 2014	Chapel of Bones	Mike Mignola and Christopher Golden	Ben Stenbeck	Dave Stewart	Ben Stenbeck
London, England, November 30, 1919: Baltimore's three friends—Demetrius Aischros, Thomas Childress, Jr., and Dr. Lemuel Rose—meet in a pub in response to Baltimore's summons, but when he doesn't arrive, they accept the invitation of an artist, Bentley, to sleep in his upstairs studio. There, they find an enormous painting of the Red King, and the walls decorated with skeletons, which come alive to attack them. Baltimore's nemesis, Haigus, has become old and weary from all the years of pursuit, and lured them there to draw Baltimore out. Just as the three men are cornered and all seems lost, Baltimore arrives. Haigus gloats that it was Baltimore's own actions that "awoke" Haigus's consciousness, and humanity will never be rid of the vampires now. Baltimore kills Haigus, but is chilled to realize that he feels nothing. In anger and frustration, Baltimore slashes the painting, and the Red King fixes its eyes upon him. Baltimore realizes he had been fighting the symptom all this time, and the true enemy had barely been aware of him until that moment. Later, while recuperating downstairs, Baltimore reaches into his chest and removes his heart, now a lump of tin with his wife's wedding ring set into its side. In an epilogue, the three companions relate their story to Simon Hodge, with Rose carrying Baltimore's tin heart in a box for evidence. When Hodge asks where Baltimore is now, Rose replies that evil things are awakening all over the world and Baltimore is trying to wipe them out to prevent the Red King from reawakening. NB Chapel of Bones is an adaptation of the chapters Crescendo: Lux et Aeternum, Finale: Libera Me, and Coda from the novel Baltimore, or, The Steadfast Tin Soldier and the Vampire.
21	#1	July 30, 2014	The Witch of Harju	Mike Mignola and Christopher Golden	Peter Bergting	Dave Stewart	Ben Stenbeck
22	#2	August 27, 2014	The Witch of Harju	Mike Mignola and Christopher Golden	Peter Bergting	Dave Stewart	Ben Stenbeck
23	#3	September 24, 2014	The Witch of Harju	Mike Mignola and Christopher Golden	Peter Bergting	Dave Stewart	Ben Stenbeck
Harju, Estonia, February 2, 1920: A woman named Sofia Yalk escapes from the reanimated corpse of her abusive husband and runs into Baltimore, now accompanied by Childress, the Sikh soldier Harish, and a new companion named Quigley. While the corpse kills Quigley, the others manage to chase it off. While the others go to get a carriage for Quigley's body, Sofia recounts to Baltimore her story; After her husband died, a black cat with red eyes appeared over the body, and during the funeral the corpse reanimated and killed everyone it came across while chasing after her. The day after, while looking at coffins for Quigley, the corpse returns, but is finally put down when Sofia lights him on fire, and Baltimore kills a lizard-like creature that emerged from its body. The witch who reanimated him appears to gloat, before fleeing into the woods. The heroes are unable to pursue her, and go to bury Quigley instead. On the way, the undertaker tells them that the witch may have one of the grieving mothers who lost their children to plague, or summoned by them. At the graveyard, they are attacked by more of the lizard-creatures, which crawl out of the buried bodies. The witch appears again and causes it to rain blood before fleeing, but Baltimore pursues her and confronts her at an altar to the Red King. She tries to run again, but Baltimore catches up to her and kills her by the sea, causing the blood rain to stop. Back at the graveyard, the heroes finish burying Quigley, along with the undertaker who was killed in the fighting. After confronting the village women, who admit to being witches but that the witch Juta went too far even for them, Baltimore and his companions leave, joined by Sofia.
24	#1	October 29, 2014	The Wolf and the Apostle	Mike Mignola and Christopher Golden	Ben Stenbeck	Dave Stewart	Ben Stenbeck
25	#2	November 26, 2014	The Wolf and the Apostle	Mike Mignola and Christopher Golden	Ben Stenbeck	Dave Stewart	Ben Stenbeck
Yalta, Crimea, March 18, 1920: A young priest with clawmarks across his face awakens from a nightmare to find Baltimore standing by his bed. Baltimore asks the priest, a member of the Inquisition, to tell his story. The priest, Joaquim Rigo, was part of a mission to kill the werewolf Duvic, who has been killing innocents and particularly members of the clergy across Eastern Europe. They chased him to an old castle near Charax, but are killed easily by Duvic. Rigo fled in terror and ends up in the castle chapel, where he confesses the Inquisition's sins and repents. Duvic appears in human form, having twisted his faith to fit his bloodthirsty nature, seeing his curse as a blessing from God which he has attempted to spread to other men of faith, but found them all blasphemers and thus killed them. Turning to wolf form, he attacks Rigo who briefly manages to fight him off but is wounded across the face by his claws. Before Duvic can finish him off, the moonlight shines through a cross-shaped stained glass window, blinding Duvic and causing him to fall through a collapsing floor. Rico barely managed to escape the castle before it collapses entirely, leaving Duvic's fate uncertain. Back in the hospital, Rigo elects to join Baltimore in his quest, retaining his Inquisitor uniform as a reminder of the Inquisition's failings.
26	#1	May 6, 2015	The Cult of the Red King	Mike Mignola and Christopher Golden	Peter Bergting	Dave Stewart	Ben Stenbeck
27	#2	June 3, 2015	The Cult of the Red King	Mike Mignola and Christopher Golden	Peter Bergting	Dave Stewart	Ben Stenbeck
28	#3	July 1, 2015	The Cult of the Red King	Mike Mignola and Christopher Golden	Peter Bergting	Dave Stewart	Ben Stenbeck
29	#4	August 5, 2015	The Cult of the Red King	Mike Mignola and Christopher Golden	Peter Bergting	Dave Stewart	Ben Stenbeck
30	#5	September 2, 2015	The Cult of the Red King	Mike Mignola and Christopher Golden	Peter Bergting	Dave Stewart	Ben Stenbeck
31	#1	April 6, 2016	Empty Graves	Mike Mignola and Christopher Golden	Peter Bergting	Michelle Madsen	Ben Stenbeck
32	#2	May 4, 2016	Empty Graves	Mike Mignola and Christopher Golden	Peter Bergting	Michelle Madsen	Ben Stenbeck
33	#3	June 1, 2016	Empty Graves	Mike Mignola and Christopher Golden	Peter Bergting	Michelle Madsen	Ben Stenbeck
34	#4	July 6, 2016	Empty Graves	Mike Mignola and Christopher Golden	Peter Bergting	Michelle Madsen	Ben Stenbeck
35	#5	August 3, 2016	Empty Graves	Mike Mignola and Christopher Golden	Peter Bergting	Michelle Madsen	Ben Stenbeck
37	#1	February 1, 2017	The Red Kingdom	Mike Mignola and Christopher Golden	Peter Bergting	Michelle Madsen	Ben Stenbeck
38	#2	March 1, 2017	The Red Kingdom	Mike Mignola and Christopher Golden	Peter Bergting	Michelle Madsen	Ben Stenbeck
39	#3	April 5, 2017	The Red Kingdom	Mike Mignola and Christopher Golden	Peter Bergting	Michelle Madsen	Ben Stenbeck
40	#4	May 3, 2017	The Red Kingdom	Mike Mignola and Christopher Golden	Peter Bergting	Michelle Madsen	Ben Stenbeck
41	#5	June 7, 2017	The Red Kingdom	Mike Mignola and Christopher Golden	Peter Bergting	Michelle Madsen	Ben Stenbeck

=== Collected editions ===
The comic book series has been collected in hardcover volumes. Only the first volume has been published in paperback. The series will be collected in a pair of hardcover omnibuses, the second of includes a new story, Monstrous, written by Mike Mignola and Christopher Golden, art by Ben Stenbeck, colors by Dave Stewart, and lettering by Clem Robins.

Volume	Title	Collects	Special Features	Published	ISBN
1	The Plague Ships	The Plague Ships	Introduction: Back From the Dead by Joe Hill; 14-page sketchbook	June 8, 2011 (HC); December 21, 2011 (TPB)	9781595826732 (HC); 9781595826770 (TPB)
2	The Curse Bells	The Curse Bells	Introduction: A World of Chilled Shadows by Joe R. Lansdale; 17-page sketchbook	June 13, 2012	9781595826749
3	A Passing Stranger and Other Stories	The Widow and the Tank; A Passing Stranger; The Play; Dr. Leskovar's Remedy; The Inquisitor	Introduction: Spectres of the War by Kim Newman; 10-page sketchbook	November 20, 2013	9781616551827
4	Chapel of Bones	The Infernal Train; Chapel of Bones	Introduction by Stephen R. Bissette; 13-page sketchbook	June 11, 2014	9781616553289
5	The Apostle and the Witch of Harju	The Witch of Harju; The Wolf and the Apostle	18-page sketchbook	March 18, 2015	9781616556181
6	The Cult of the Red King	The Cult of the Red King	18-page sketchbook	January 6, 2016	9781616558215
7	Empty Graves	Empty Graves	18-page sketchbook	December 7, 2016	9781506700427
8	The Red Kingdom	The Red Kingdom	Afterword by Christopher Golden; 12-page sketchbook	October 25, 2017	9781506701974
Omnibus Editions
Volume		Collects	Special Features	Published	ISBN
Baltimore Omnibus – Volume 1		The Plague Ships; The Curse Bells; The Widow and the Tank; A Passing Stranger; The Play; Dr. Leskovar's Remedy; The Inquisitor; The Infernal Train; Chapel of Bones	Introduction by Mike Mignola; Sketchbook material from: The Plague Ships; The Curse Bells; A Passing Stranger and Other Stories; Chapel of Bones; Cover gallery	October 9, 2019	9781506712468
Baltimore Omnibus – Volume 2		The Witch of Harju; The Wolf and the Apostle; The Cult of the Red King; Empty Graves; The Red Kingdom; Monstrous	Introduction by Christopher Golden; Sketchbook material from: The Apostle and the Witch of Harju; The Cult of the Red King; Empty Graves; The Red Kingdom; Cover gallery	March 25, 2020	9781506712475

== Cancelled film adaptation ==
New Regency optioned the rights to adapt Baltimore as a film in September 2007. The novel's authors wrote a screenplay, while David S. Goyer was set to direct. After a leadership change at New Regency, the studio abandoned the project, and the rights have reverted to the authors.
