= Ararat (novel) =

2017 book by Christopher Golden

- Author: Christopher Golden
- Language: English
- Series: Ben Walker
- Genre: Horror, thriller
- Publisher: St. Martin's Press
- Publication date: April 18, 2017
- Pages: 320
- ISBN: 978-1-250-11705-2

Ararat is a 2017 horror novel by Christopher Golden.

== Synopsis ==
After an earthquake reopens a cave on Mount Ararat, revealing a ship that many researchers and treasure seekers identify as Noah's Ark. Inside, explorers uncover demonic opposition.

== Reception ==
Ararat was well received by critics for its suspense and well developed characters. Dave Simms of Cemetery Dance Publications wrote that "Golden's knack for intertwining sympathetic characters and the horrific with suspense begs for continued reading". The book received the Bram Stoker Award for Novel in 2017.

== Adaptation ==
In 2019, AGC Television purchased the rights to produce a television series based on Ararat and its sequels. The series was scheduled to begin production on a first season based on the book in late 2019.
