= Reading the Vampire Slayer =

Academic book about the fictional Buffyverse (2004)

- Editor: Roz Kaveney
- Author: Various
- Subject: Buffyverse
- Genre: academic publication, Media Study
- Publisher: Tauris Parke Paperbacks
- Publication date: March 18, 2004 (2nd updated ed.)
- Pages: 288
- ISBN: 1-86064-984-X
- OCLC: 54899596

Reading the Vampire Slayer is a 2004 academic publication relating to the fictional Buffyverse established by TV series, Buffy and Angel.

== Book description and contents ==
Covers both Buffy (up to its final season) and Angel (up to season 4). The book gives in depth analysis highlighting show titles, quotes, key comments that foreshadow something else. The book progresses season by season discussing character growth, and many hidden metaphors.

These are the contents for the first edition (published 2001):

Chapter	Title	Author
01	"She Saved the World. A Lot: An Introduction to the Themes and Structure of Buffy and Angel"	Roz Kaveney
02	"Entropy as Demon: Buffy in Southern California"	Boyd Tonkin
03	"Vampire Dialectics: Knowledge, Institutions and Labour"	Brian Wall & Michael Zryd
04	"Laugh, Spawn of Hell, Laugh"	Steve Wilson
05	"'It Wasn't Our World Anymore – A They Made It Theirs': Reading Space and Place"	Karen Sayer
06	"'What You Are, What's to Come': Feminism, citizenship, and the divine"	Zoe-Jane Playden
07	"'Just a Girl': Buffy as Icon"	Anne Millard Daugherty
08	"'Concentrate on the kicking movie': "Buffy" and East Asian Cinema"	Dave West
09	"Staking a Claim: The Series and Its Slash Fan-Fiction"	Esther Saxey
10	"'They always mistake me for the character I play!': Transformation, identity and role-playing in the Buffyverse (and a defence of fine acting)"	Ian Shuttleworth

== Critical reception ==
The book was reviewed by Pyramid, Nicholas Birns in Science Fiction Studies, Fiona Kelleghan in the Journal of the Fantastic in the Arts, Deborah Netburn in The New York Observer, David V. Barrett in The Independent, and David Beard in Popular Communication.
