= Zombie Movie =

- Directed by: Michael J. Asquith, Ben Stenbeck
- Written by: Michael J. Asquith, Ben Stenbeck
- Produced by: Michael J. Asquith, Ben Stenbeck
- Starring: Simon Niblett; Des Morgan; Ben Stenbeck; 1965 Holden EH Station Wagon
- Music by: Crumb
- Distributed by: Valve
- Release date: 14 October 2005
- Running time: 15:04
- Country: New Zealand
- Language: English

Zombie Movie is a short zombie film produced by 2Chums Moving Pictures in 2005. 2Chums Moving Pictures consisted mainly of Michael J. Asquith & Ben Stenbeck, both former employees at Weta Workshop and current employees at Valve. The movie was the first media distributed via Steam.

== Plot ==
Somewhere in New Zealand in 1986, three young men, Paul (Simon Niblett), Darryn (Des Morgan) and Sam (Stenbeck), find themselves trapped in a 1965 Holden EH Station Wagon without fuel and surrounded by zombies. The film focuses on the interaction between the three as their conversations turn from their lack of food to their musical tastes to plans of escape. Darryn finds a can of petrol in the boot, and the three drill a hole in what they think is the feed line, but they unwittingly pour the fuel out of the bottom of the car. As the days draw on Sam's mental state deteriorates and he expresses a wish to die, and the other two, seeing him as potential food, attempt to stab him with a Swiss Army knife, but this proves unsuccessful and they relent. Sam eventually dies of his injuries, and Paul turns into a zombie after succumbing to a bite he sustained before the film began, forcing Darryn to decapitate him. After throwing Paul's head out of the window, he notices that the car is on top of a sewer entrance. Darryn escapes through the bottom of the car into the sewers, where he lights a cigarette in triumph, unwittingly setting off an explosion as a result of the gasoline that was poured down there. The closing scene of the film shows all three of the men in a bright white version of the car, with Darryn in the back flanked by two angels (Sivannah Bassant and Micah Brown) implied to be Heaven.

== Awards ==
- Winner Best Horror Comedy Short Film, Screamfest LA 2005
- Best Short Film, New York City Horror Film Festival 2005 NYC Horror Film Festival
