= Buffy the Vampire Slayer and Philosophy =

2003 book edited by James B. South

BtVS and Philosophy
- Editor: James B. South
- Author: Various
- Subject: Buffyverse
- Genre: academic publication, media study
- Publisher: Open Court Publishing Company
- Publication date: March 2003
- Pages: 288
- ISBN: 0-8126-9531-3
- OCLC: 51481996
- Dewey Decimal: 791.45/72 21
- LC Class: PN1992.77.B84 B835 2003

Buffy the Vampire Slayer and Philosophy: Fear and Trembling in Sunnydale is a 2003 academic publication relating to the fictional Buffyverse established by two TV series, Buffy the Vampire Slayer and Angel.

The book was reviewed by Rebecca Housel in The Journal of Popular Culture, Maxine Phillips in Commonweal, Karen Bennett in Notre Dame Philosophical Reviews, and Margaret Weigel in The Women's Review of Books.

== Book description ==
Despite creator Joss Whedon's professed atheism, Buffy often dealt with religious and philosophical symbolism. The book is made up of a collection of essays that link classical philosophy to the Buffy show's ability to explore the underlying evil in everyday life through supernatural metaphor.

== Contents ==
Chapter	Title	Author
01	"Faith and Plato: 'You're Nothing! Disgusting, Murderous Bitch'"	Greg Forster
02	"Also Sprach Faith: The Problem of the Happy Rogue Vampire Slayer"	Karl Schudt
03	"'The I in Team': Buffy and Feminist Ethics"	Jessica Prater Miller
04	"BtVS as Feminist Noir"	Thomas Hibbs
05	"Feminism and the Ethics of Violence: Why Buffy Kicks Ass"	Mimi Marinucci
06	"Balderdash and Chicanery: Science and Beyond"	Andrew Aberdein
07	"Pluralism, Pragmatism, and Pals: The Slayer Subverts the Science Wars"	Madeline M. Muntersbjorn
08	"Between Heaven and Hells: Multidimensional Cosmology in Kant and Buffy the Vampire Slayer"	James Lawler
09	"Buffy Goes to College, Adam "Murder(s) to Dissect": Education and Knowledge in a Postmodern World"	Toby Daspit
10	""My God, it's like a Greek tragedy": Willow Rosenberg and Human Irrationality"	James B. South
11	"Should We Do What Buffy Would Do?"	Jason Kawal
12	"Passion and Action – In and Out of Control"	Carolyn Korsmeyer
13	"Buffy in the Buff: A Slayer's Solution to Aristotle's Love Paradox"	Sharon Kaye and Melissa Milavec
14	"A Kantian Analysis of Moral Judgment in Buffy the Vampire Slayer"	Scott R. Stroud
15	"Brown Skirts: Fascism, Christianity, and the Eternal Demon"	Neal King
16	"Prophecy Girl and the Powers That Be: The Philosophy of Religion in the Buffyverse"	Wendy Love Anderson
17	"Justifying the Means: Punishment in the Buffyverse"	Jacob Held
18	"No Big Win: Themes of Sacrifice, Salvation, and Redemption"	Gregory J. Sakal
19	"Old Familiar Vampires: The Politics of the Buffyverse"	Jeffrey L. Pasley
20	"Morality on Television: The Case of Buffy the Vampire Slayer"	Richard Greene and Wayne Yuen
21	"High School is Hell: Metaphor made Literal"	Tracy Little
22	"Feeling for Buffy – The Girl Next Door"	Michael Levine and Steven Jay Schneider
