= Slayer Slang =

2003 academic publication

- Author: Michael Adams
- Subject: Buffyverse
- Genre: academic publication, Media Study
- Publisher: Oxford University Press
- Publication date: July 1, 2003
- Pages: 320
- ISBN: 0-19-516033-9
- OCLC: 51769230
- Dewey Decimal: 791.45/72 21
- LC Class: PN1992.77.B84 A34 2003

Slayer Slang: A Buffy the Vampire Slayer Lexicon is a 2003 academic publication examining "Buffyspeak", the slang made popular by the television series Buffy the Vampire Slayer.

The book was reviewed by Stamford Advocate's David Podgurski, The Journal of Popular Culture's Susan Clerc, Journal of English Linguistics' Susan Tamasi, American Speech's Richard W. Bailey, and College & Research Libraries News' George M. Eberhart.

== Contents ==
Chapter	Title
Intro	"Introduction" (by Jane Espenson)
01	"Slayer Slang"
02	"Making Slayer Slang"
03	"Studying the Micro-Histories of Words"
04	"Ephemeral Language"
Glossary	"Slayer Slang: Glossary"
