= Jana Riess =

American writer and editor (born 1969)

- Born: Jana Kathryn Riess; December 13, 1969 (age 56); United States
- Education: Wellesley College (BA); Princeton Theological Seminary (MA); Columbia University (PhD)
- Occupation: Writer
- Spouse: Phil Smith
- Children: Jerusha (born c. 1999)
- Writing career
- Language: English
- Period: 1990s-present
- Genre: Religion

Jana Kathryn Riess (born December 13, 1969) is an American professor, writer, and editor. Riess' writings have focused on American religions, especially the Church of Jesus Christ of Latter-day Saints (LDS Church) of which she is a member, and other new religious movements.

== Early life and education ==
As she describes in her own autobiographical writings, Riess was born in the Midwestern United States, and has an older brother, John. She and her mother Phyllis were, per her description, abandoned by her father without warning in 1984, by which time her brother was on his own. Riess has described her father, who died at age 71 in Mobile, Alabama, in October 2010, as "an angry atheist" and her mother as "considerably more charitable but no more interested in organized religion."

Riess has a Bachelor's degree from Wellesley College, a Master's degree in theology from the Princeton Theological Seminary, and a PhD in American Religious history from Columbia University.

== Career ==
From 1999 to 2008 she was the religion book editor for Publishers Weekly.

A member of the LDS Church, Riess has spoken at Brigham Young University Women's Conference and other gatherings of the LDS Church, as well as professional conferences.

=== Writings ===
Riess' 2019 The Next Mormons: How Millennials Are Changing the LDS Church, received critical praise; Phil Zuckerman, a professor of sociology at Pitzer College in Claremont, California, describes the work as "[s]ociologically sound, extremely well-researched and well-written".

Riess and her colleague Benjamin Knoll published a landmark analysis which questioned the accuracy of reports that LDS membership was growing.

==== Tweeting the Bible ====
On October 4, 2009, Riess began a project to tweet the bible. Her "Twible" quest concluded in January 2013. Each tweet summarizes a chapter of the bible. Riess tweets the bible in order and plans to hit all 1,189 chapters in 140 characters. She later published it in book form as The Twible: All the Chapters of the Bible in 140 Characters or Less . . . Now with 68% More Humor!

=== Other work ===
In July 2001 Riess moderated a debate between Richard Abanes and Connie Neal at a convention of Christian retailers over the "real religious concern" over the Harry Potter books with regard to their presentation of witchcraft and aspects of the occult. Among the books by Riess are the 2004 What Would Buffy Do?, and an abridgment of The Book of Mormon with commentary.

As of 2017, she was conducting "The Next Mormons" survey project to look at how different generations of Mormons have interacted with the Church.

She is a senior columnist for Religion News Service.

Her research into Mormon retention rates helped provoke public debate around the topic.

== Personal life ==
Riess is a convert to the LDS Church. She is married to Phil Smith, and they reside in Cincinnati.

== Works ==
Books

- Riess, Jana (2002), The Spiritual Traveler: Boston and New England: A Guide to Sacred Sites and Peaceful Places, Mahwah, NJ: HiddenSpring, ISBN 978-1-58768-008-3
- —— (2004), What Would Buffy Do?: The Vampire Slayer as Spiritual Guide, San Francisco: Jossey-Bass, ISBN 978-0-7879-6922-6
- —— Bigelow, Christopher Kimball (2005), Mormonism for Dummies, Hoboken, NJ: John Wiley & Sons, ISBN 978-0-7645-7195-4
- —— (2005), The Book of Mormon: Selections Annotated and Explained, Woodstock, VT: SkyLight Paths, ISBN 1-59473-076-8
- —— (2011), fLunking sainthood: A Year of Breaking the Sabbath, Forgetting to Pray, and Still Loving My Neighbor, Brewster, MA: Paraclete Press, ISBN 978-1-55725-660-7
- Ogilbee, Mark; Riess, Jana (2006), American Pilgrimage: Eleven Sacred Journeys and Spiritual Destinations, Brewster, MA: Paraclete Press, ISBN 978-1-55725-447-4

Articles

- Riess, Jana (June 1999), "Stripling Warriors Choose the Right: The Cultural Engagements of Contemporary Mormon Kitsch" (PDF), Sunstone Magazine (114): 36–47
- —— (Spring 2000), "'Heathen in Our Fair Land': Presbyterian Women Missionaries in Utah, 1870–90", Journal of Mormon History, 26 (1): 165–195, archived from the original on August 8, 2011
- —— (August 21, 2000), "New Genres, Emerging Audiences", Publishers Weekly, 247 (34): S4
- —— (2001), "Mormon Fast and Testimony Meetings", in Colleen McDannell (ed.), Religions of the United States in Practice, vol. 2, Princeton, NJ: Princeton University Press, pp. 67–71, ISBN 0-691-01001-3
- —— (2001), "The Latter-day Saint Word of Wisdom", Religions of the United States in Practice, vol. 2, Princeton University Press, pp. 297–301, ISBN 0-691-01001-3
- —— (2002), "Introduction", Mary Baker Eddy, Speaking for Herself: Autobiographical Reflections, Boston: The Writings of Mary Baker Eddy, pp. xv–xlv, ISBN 0-87952-275-5
- —— (March 2003), "Strengthening the Part-Member Marriage?: We're Just Fine, Thank You" (PDF), Sunstone (126): 66–67
- —— (July 2003), "Seek Ye Out of the Best Flicks: R-Rated Movies That Have Helped Me Think About the Gospel" (PDF), Sunstone Magazine (128): 42–44
- —— (March 2005), "'More Fully Unspotted from the World': Thoughts on Sabbath Keeping" (PDF), Sunstone (135): 23–25
- —— (March 2005), "Sacred Envy: What I've Learned from Other Religions" (PDF), Sunstone (136): 52–54
- —— (September 2005), "For the Love of Reading" (PDF), Sunstone (138): 56–58
- —— (September 2006), "How to Give a Sacrament Meeting Talk: An Open Letter to Converts" (PDF), Sunstone (142): 55–57
- —— (June 2007), "Why the Heck Don't Mormons Swear?: Musings on the Sacred and the Profane" (PDF), Sunstone (146): 57–59
- —— (October 2, 2007), "We're Christians Too", Christian Century, 124 (20): 9–10, archived from the original on October 11, 2008
- —— (December 2007), "Tributaries of Faith" (PDF), Sunstone (148): 20–26
- —— (2009), "Book of Mormon Stories that Steph Meyer Tells to Me: LDS Themes in the Twilight Saga and the Host", BYU Studies, 48 (3): 141–47

Other

- Riess, Jana (1991), The Saints Go Marching In: Mormonism in American Politics, 1970–1990, [Honors thesis], Wellesley, MA: Department of Religion, Wellesley College
- —— (2000), Heathen in Our Fair Land: Anti-Polygamy and Protestant Women's Missions to Utah, 1869–1910, [PhD Thesis], New York: Columbia University
- Bigelow, Christopher Kimball (2007), Jana Riess (ed.), The Timechart History of Mormonism from Premortality to the Present, Bassingbourne, Hertfordshire, UK: Worth Press, ISBN 978-1-903025-40-6
