= Fighting the Forces =

2002 academic book relating to the fictional Buffyverse

Fighting The Forces
- Editor: Rhonda V. Wilcox; David Lavery
- Author: Various
- Subject: Buffyverse
- Genre: academic publication, Media Study
- Publisher: Rowman & Littlefield Publishers, Inc.
- Publication date: April 2002
- Pages: 320
- ISBN: 0-7425-1681-4
- OCLC: 47443883
- Dewey Decimal: 791.45/72 21
- LC Class: PN1992.77.B84 F54 2002

Fighting the Forces: What's at Stake in Buffy the Vampire Slayer is a 2002 academic publication relating to the fictional Buffyverse established by TV series, Buffy and Angel.

== Book description ==
The book looks at the struggle to examine meaning in the television series, Buffy the Vampire Slayer. The series is examined from a variety of viewpoints, and especially the social and cultural issues dealt with by the series and their place in a wider literary context.

== Contents ==
The chapters are grouped as follows:

- Part 1: Forces of Society and Culture: Gender, Generations, Violence, Class, Race and Religion (Chapters 1–10).
- Part 2: Forces of Art and Imagination (Past): Vampires, Magic, and Monsters (Chapters 11–16).
- Part 3: Forces of Art and Imagination (Present): Fan Relationships, Metaphoric and Real (Chapters 17–20).

Chapter	Title	Author
Foreword	The Color of Dark in Buffy the Vampire Slayer	Camille Bacon-Smith
Intro	Introduction	Rhonda V. Wilcox and David Lavery
01	"Who Died and Made Her the Boss?" Patterns of Mortality in Buffy	Rhonda V. Wilcox
02	"My Emotions Give Me Power": The Containment of Girls' Anger in Buffy	Elyce Rae Helford
03	"I'm Buffy and You're ... History": The Postmodern Politics of Buffy	Patricia Pender
04	Surpassing the Love of Vampires; or, Why (and How) a Queer Reading of the Buffy/Willow Relationship is Denied	Farah Mendlesohn
05	Choosing Your Own Mother: Mother-Daughter Conflicts in Buffy	J. P. Williams
06	Staking in Tongues: Speech Act as Weapon in Buffy	Karen Eileen Overbey and Lahney Preston-Matto
07	Slaying in Black and White: Kendra as Tragic Mulatta in Buffy	Lynne Edwards
08	The Undemonization of Supporting Characters in Buffy	Mary Alice Money
09	"Sometimes You Need a Story": American Christianity, Vampures, and Buffy	Gregory Erickson
10	Darkness Falls on the Endless Summer: Buffy as Gidget for the Fin de Siècle	Catherine Siemann
11	Of Creatures and Creators: Buffy Does Frankenstein	Anita Rose
12	Sex and the Single Vampire: The Evolution of the Vampire Lothario and Its Representation in Buffy	Diane DeKelb-Rittenhouse
13	"Digging the Undead": Death and Desire in Buffy	Elisabeth Krimmer and Shilpa Raval
14	Spirit Guides and Shadow Selves: From the Dream Life of Buffy (and Faith)	Donald Keller
15	Hubble-Bubble, Herbs and Grimoires: Magic, Manichaeanism, and Witchcraft in Buffy	Tanya Krzywinska
16	Whose Side Are You on, Anyway? Children, Adults, and the Use of Fairy Tales in Buffy	Sarah E. Skwire
17	Crossing the Final Taboo: Family, Sexuality, and Incest in Buffyverse Fan Fiction	Kristina Busse
18	"My Boyfriend's in the Band!" Buffy and the Rhetoric of Music	S. Renee Dechert
19	Buffy’s Mary Sue is Jonathan: Buffy Acknowledges the Fans	Justine Larbalestier
20	www.buffy.com: Cliques, Boundaries, and Hierarchies in an Internet Community	Amanda Zweerink and Sarah N. Gatson
Afterword	The Genius of Joss Whedon	David Lavery

== Critical reception ==
The book was reviewed by Dorothy Kuykendal in Extrapolation, Sabrina P. Ramet in The Journal of Popular Culture, Shannon Rupp in Ottawa Citizen, Nicholas Birns in Science Fiction Studies, Fiona Kelleghan in the Journal of the Fantastic in the Arts, and Deborah Netburn in The New York Observer.
