= Baltimore, or, The Steadfast Tin Soldier and the Vampire =

2007 illustrated novel written by Mike Mignola and Christopher Golden

- Illustrated novel cover
- Date: August 28, 2007
- Publisher: Bantam Spectra

Creative team
- Writers: Mike Mignola; Christopher Golden
- Artists: Mike Mignola; Christopher Golden

Original publication
- Language: English
- ISBN: 978-0553804713

Baltimore, or, The Steadfast Tin Soldier and the Vampire is a 2007 illustrated novel written by Mike Mignola and Christopher Golden, and illustrated by Mignola. It follows the quest of Lord Henry Baltimore, a British officer during World War I who inadvertently changes the course of the war, and his own life, by wounding a vampire on the battlefield.

The book was expanded into a comic book series, published by Dark Horse Comics, which also publishes Mignola's Hellboy series.

== Plot ==
Each chapter begins with a quote from Hans Christian Andersen's, "The Steadfast Tin Soldier". In the original book, years were stylized as "19__". When the series was expanded in comic form, the dates were specified.

=== Prelude: Requiem ===
November 1914: Captain Henry Baltimore leads a night attack across the No Man's Land of a battlefield in the Ardennes Forest. His entire battalion is killed by Hessian fire. Baltimore's leg is wounded, and he is left for dead. He awakes some hours later to see giant bat-like creatures feeding on his dead men. When one attempts to feed on him, he slashes at it with his bayonet, slicing its face. The giant creature in return wounds Baltimore, infesting his leg with unnatural gangrene. Baltimore is saved when the bat-like creatures flee the light of dawn.

=== Arrival: Kyrie ===
November 30, 1919: While a mysterious plague is sweeping all of Europe, three men – Sea captain Demetrius Aischros, English nobleman Thomas Childress, Jr., and surgeon Dr. Lemuel Rose – meet in a London pub, The Ugly Muse, each having received a summons from Lord Baltimore. While they are waiting, each man recounts his encounter with Baltimore, and also an experience from his own life which made him ready to accept Baltimore's supernatural explanation for the plague.

==== The Surgeon's Tale: Offertorio ====
December 1914: Dr. Rose amputates Baltimore's leg following the failed mission in the Ardennes. While recovering in hospital, Baltimore is visited by a man with a deep scar on his face and missing his right eye. Baltimore instinctively knew this man was the same creature he'd wounded. (In the novel, the vampire is never named, but in the comics he is called Haigus.) The vampire informs Baltimore that his kind were content to scavenge the corpses of the Great War, but by cutting his face, Baltimore has declared a war between them and humanity. The first victims of this war are the other soldiers from the field hospital, now infected with vampirism.

Dr. Rose recounts that, in the fall of 1914, before he met Lord Baltimore, he encountered a soldier who had been infected with some kind of malevolent spirit that caused him to shapeshift into a bear. Deciding he was a danger to his comrades, the soldier deliberately let himself be captured by the Germans, then shifted and began wreaking havoc behind their lines, leaving behind his human skin, still dressed in his uniform.

==== The Sailor's Tale: Sanctus ====
Summer, 1915: Aischros captains the boat that transports Baltimore to London. The two become friends on the journey and Aischros agrees to assist Baltimore on his way home to Trevelyan Island on the Cornish Coast. While in London, Baltimore has a masterfully crafted, hinged wooden leg made. He and Aischros noticed the plague spreading. When Baltimore arrives home, he learns that his entire family except his wife, Elowen, have been claimed by the plague, and falls into a delirious fever.

A few months later, Aischros returns to the island and meets a mysterious monk, who relates that when Baltimore finally recovered from his fever, the vampire visited the island and attacked Elowen, turning her into a vampire and forcing Baltimore to kill her. The monk visited Baltimore in his despair and described a vision he had experienced months before, of a towering red figure with a crown of flame, which the monk believes was a premonition of a greater evil that is coming. The monk told Baltimore that God used Baltimore's pain and suffering to forge him into a weapon against the evil.

Aischros recounts an encounter he had in his youth in Cicagne, an Italian town haunted by supernatural puppets carved from a tree that had grown in a cemetery for criminals and suicides.

==== The Soldier's Tale: Agnus Dei ====
December 1915: Childress, a childhood friend of Baltimore, last saw him in 1915. The Great War had come to an early end as the plague swept Europe. Childress returned home to Trevelyan Island and found Baltimore sitting outside the burning remains of his family home, admitting that he had killed all the remaining vampires on the island, including his entire family. Childress felt as though his friend's heart and soul had died, yet still he continued to live.

Childress recounts a story from a visit to Chile when he was twenty-one, about a village lake that had been haunted by a Minhocão-like demon.

=== The Savior's Tale: Benedictus ===
While Dr. Rose, Captain Aischros, and Mr. Childress wait for Baltimore, a courier delivers to them a journal written by Lord Baltimore, which details Baltimore's encounter with a vampire called Reveka in Korzha, Romania, in June 1919. The last entry in the journal leaves them uncertain whether Baltimore is still coming to meet them, or if he is even still alive.

=== Crescendo: Lux et Aeternum ===
The three men decide to stay the night, but there are no rooms left at The Ugly Muse, so an artist called Bentley offers them space in his studio. When they follow him there, they find it transformed into a chapel of bones, dominated by a macabre painting. Initially each of the three men perceives the painting differently, seeing his own personal horror – Dr. Rose sees the demonic bear, Captain Aischros a giant puppet, and Mr. Childress the lake monster in Chile. This lasts just for a moment, and for all three the painting quickly resolves into its true form – the towering red figure described by the monk, the Red King.

Baltimore's nemesis, Haigus, has become old and weary from all the years of being pursued by Baltimore. He plans to kill Baltimore's friends to draw him out and finish their feud once and for all. The three companions are attacked by skeletons; despite desperate fighting (including by Dr. Rose who sets the room on fire) it quickly becomes clear that the three are ill-equipped to fend off the supernatural forces arrayed against them. Just as they are cornered and all seems lost, Lord Baltimore arrives.

=== Finale: Libera Me ===
Lord Baltimore easily cuts down the skeleton-wraiths and confronts Haigus, demanding to know why vampires have returned to plague humanity. Haigus responds that it was not the vampires' choice; rather, he says it was the violence and death of the Great War that awoke them from their slumber, and humanity will never be rid of them now. Baltimore kills Haigus, but is chilled to realize that he feels nothing. He believed killing Haigus would grant him peace, but instead he feels numb. In anger and frustration, Baltimore slashes the painting of the Red King that had somehow remained untouched in the center of the room despite the intense fighting and roaring flames. Instantly, the room is filled with a preternatural cold, snuffing out the fire completely. Baltimore and his three companions suddenly feel as though an immense presence has filled the room, and the Red King in the painting fixes its eyes upon Baltimore. He realizes that all this time he had been fighting the symptom, and the true enemy had barely been aware of him until that very moment when he defaced its likeness. The moment then passes as quickly as it came; the presence leaves the room and the painting becomes just a painting again. The four men leave the studio, discovering on the way that the artist, Bentley, has cut his own throat with a shard of glass.

=== Coda ===
Baltimore and his three companions go downstairs to the bar to tend their wounds and drink. Baltimore explains bitterly that his fight is not over, that it will never be over, and that he understands what he has been made into. Then Baltimore reaches into his chest and pulls out his heart, which has become a lump of tin with his wife's wedding ring set in its side.

== Publication ==
Mike Mignola came up with the concept for Baltimore, or, The Steadfast Tin Soldier and the Vampire and conceived much of the plot, though Christopher Golden penned the novel based on their joint efforts.

== Comics ==
In 2010 Dark Horse Comics began a comic book series set in the middle of the novel in the years when Lord Baltimore was hunting Haigus. It is written by both Mike Mignola and Christopher Golden with Ben Stenbeck on art duties.

Portions of the Prelude were adapted into the story arc The Plague Ships, and the chapters Crescendo, Finale, and Coda were adapted into the story arc Chapel of Bones, in the comic book series.

== Reception ==
PopMatters called it "thoughtful (and) studied", and observed that Golden and Mignola "understand quite well (...) the simple thrill of a well-told spook story spun out in dramatic segments by shadowy characters in seedy settings." Publishers Weekly lauded it as a "haunting allegory on the nature of war".

== Film adaptation ==
New Regency optioned the rights to adapt Baltimore as a film in September 2007. The novel's authors wrote a screenplay, while David S. Goyer was set to direct. After a leadership change at New Regency, the studio abandoned the project, and the rights have reverted to the authors.
