= Robert Pateman =

Australian cricketer

Personal information
- Born: 28 August 1856; Magpie, Victoria, Australia

Domestic team information
- Years: Team
- 1880-1882: Victoria
- Source: Cricinfo, 22 July 2015

Robert Pateman (28 August 1856, date of death unknown) was an Australian cricketer. He played two first-class cricket matches for Victoria between 1880 and 1882.

== See also ==
- List of Victoria first-class cricketers
