= Steve Pateman =

British banking executive

Steve Pateman was the chief executive of Shawbrook Bank. He was previously an executive with Santander and Royal Bank of Scotland.
