= Seven Seasons of Buffy =

2003 book about the Buffyverse

- Editor: Glenn Yeffeth
- Author: Various.
- Subject: Buffyverse
- Genre: academic publication, Media Study
- Publisher: Benbella Books
- Publication date: September 3, 2003
- Pages: 240
- ISBN: 1-932100-08-3
- OCLC: 52721040
- Dewey Decimal: 791.45/72 22
- LC Class: PN1992.77.B84 S48 2003

Seven Seasons of Buffy: Science Fiction and Fantasy Writers Discuss Their Favorite Television Show is a 2003 academic publication relating to the fictional Buffyverse established by the television series Buffy the Vampire Slayer and Angel.

The book was reviewed by Kristine Huntley in Booklist, Rosalind Dayen in Library Journal, and Christine C. Menefee in School Library Journal.

== Book description and contents ==
A batch of essays from science-fiction and fantasy writers that examine the show's scope, the growth of its characters, and the effect it had on its fans.

Chapter	Title	Author
Foreword	"Taste Our Steel"	Drew Goddard
01	"Buffy vs. the Old-Fashioned 'Hero'"	Brin, David
02	"Is That Your Final Answer ...?"	Conrad, Roxanne Longstreet
03	"Sex and the Single Slayer"	Kilpatrick, Nancy
04	"The Search for Spike's Balls"	Kenyon, Sherrilyn
05	"Skin Pale as Apple Blossom"	Aloi, Peg
06	"Lions, Gazelles and Buffy"	Yarbro, Chelsea
07	"The Good, the Bad, and the Ambivalent"	Resnick, Laura
08	"For the Love of Riley"	West, Michelle
09	"A Buffy Confession"	Larbalestier, Justine
10	"Dating Death"	Cruise, Jennifer
11	"The Meaning of Buffy"	Krause, Marguerite
12	"When Did the Scoobies Become Insiders?"	Zettel, Sarah
13	"A Reflection on Ugliness"	Harris, Charlaine
14	"Power of Becoming"	Lichtenberg, Jacqueline
15	"Unseen Horrors & Shadowy Manipulations"	Murphy, Kevin Andrew
16	"Sex in the Suburbs"	Montgomery, Carla
17	"Where's the Religion in Willow's Wicca?"	Golden, Christie
18	"Love Saves the World"	Lorrah, Jean
19	"A World Without Shrimp"	Carter, Margaret L.
20	"Matchmaking on the Hellmouth"	Watt-Evans, Lawrence
21	"Slayers of the Last Arc"	Holder, Nancy
