= What Would Buffy Do? =

2004 book by Jana Riess

- Author: Jana Riess
- Subject: Buffyverse
- Genre: Media Study
- Publisher: Jossey-Bass
- Publication date: April 30, 2004
- Pages: 208
- ISBN: 0-7879-6922-2
- OCLC: 53879465
- Dewey Decimal: 791.45/72 22
- LC Class: BV4501.3 .R54 2004

What Would Buffy Do?: The Vampire Slayer as Spiritual Guide is a 2004 book by Jana Riess which examines the themes of spirituality and morality in the fictional Buffyverse, as established by the television series Buffy the Vampire Slayer and Angel.

The book was reviewed by Publishers Weekly, Kristine Huntley in Booklist, and Christian Graham in Library Journal.

== Book description ==
Jana Riess argues that despite the show being ostensibly secular in some ways, it takes on some very spiritual elements. Riess attempts to get to the heart of the show's values. She uses as a key example Buffy's gradual embrace of self-sacrifice for a greater good instead of "normal" teenage commitment to materialism. Such self-sacrifice is typical among many key religious figures.

The idea of redemption is also an important theme in the show, which is dealt with by characters such as Angel, who has to begin to make amends for his past misdeeds as a vampire; Faith, the rogue slayer driven by self-hatred and envy; and Spike, the vampire whose love for a slayer causes him to seek to regain his soul.

The book also includes an interview with Eliza Dushku.

== Contents ==
The book contains three main sections. The first deals with issues of "Personal Spirituality" (Chapters 1–5). The second section, "Companions on the Journey", expands to look at relationships with families, friends, and mentors (Chapters 6–8). The final section, "Saving the World", looks at socially engaged spirituality (Chapters 9–11).

Chapter	Title
01	"Be a Hero, Even When You'd Rather Go to the Mall: The Power of Self-Sacrifice"
02	"Changes Make Us Human: Embracing the River of Change"
03	"Death is Our Gift: What Death Can Teach Us About Living"
04	"'The Anger Gives You Fire': Can Negative Emotions Be Constructive?"
05	"The "Monster Sarcasm Rally": Humor as Power"
06	"'What Can't We Face If We're Together?': The Power of Friendship"
07	"Obey Your Teacher, Except When He's Wrong: Spiritual Mentors on the Path to Maturity"
08	"The Higher Way: Choosing Forgiveness over Revenge"
09	"What Goes Around Comes Around: Consequences"
10	"The Monster Inside: Taming the Darkness Within Ourselves"
11	"'Redemption Is Hard': Personal Deliverance in the Buffyverse"
