= Why Buffy Matters =

2005 academic publication

- Author: Rhonda Wilcox
- Subject: Buffyverse
- Genre: academic publication, Media Study
- Publisher: I. B. Tauris
- Publication date: October 13, 2005
- Pages: 256
- ISBN: 1-84511-029-3
- OCLC: 60513984

Why Buffy Matters: The Art of Buffy the Vampire Slayer is a 2005 academic publication relating to the fictional Buffyverse established by TV series, Buffy and Angel.

The book was reviewed by Angie Burns in Feminism & Psychology, Alan McKee in Media International Australia, Kristine Huntley in Booklist, and in Publishers Weekly.

== Book description ==
Rhonda Wilcox explores the artistic merits of the television series Buffy the Vampire Slayer. Highlighting its depth and symbolism, she argues that Buffy should be recognized as an art form deserving of respect, similar to film or literature.

The book begins by exploring various themes, including the symbolic importance of character names and connections drawn between Buffy and the Harry Potter series. The latter portion of the book highlights and examines seven Buffy episodes ("Surprise", "Innocence", "The Zeppo", "Hush", "Restless", "The Body", and "Once More, with Feeling").

== Contents ==
| Chapter | Title |
|---|---|
| 01 | "There Will Never Be a 'Very Special' Buffy: Symbol and Language" |
| 02 | "Pain as Bright as Steel: Mythic Striving and Light as Pain" |
| 03 | "I Think I Can Name Myself: Naming and Identity in BtVS" |
| 04 | "When Harry Met Buffy: Buffy Summers, Harry Potter, and Heroism" |
| 05 | "Every Night I Save You: Buffy, Spike, Sex and Redemption" |
| 06 | "Show Me Your World: Exiting the Text and the Globalization of Buffy" |
| 07 | "Love and Loss: It's Not Over - Time, Love, and Loss in 'Surprise'/'Innocence'" |
| 08 | "Laughter: Xander, Laughter, and 'The Zeppo'" |
| 09 | "Fear: Power, Silence and Fear in 'Hush'" |
| 10 | "Poetry: T.S. Eliot Comes to Television: 'Restless'" |
| 11 | "Death: Quality TV and the Supernatural in 'The Body'" |
| 12 | "Song: Once, More with Textual Feeling" |
