= Thomas E. Sniegoski =

American writer and journalist

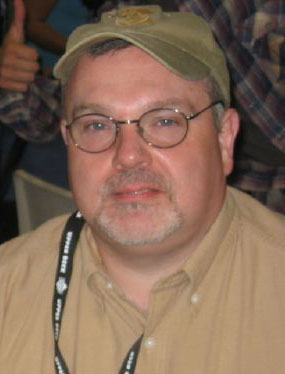
- Sniegoski at the 2007 San Diego Comic Con
- Occupations: Novelist; comic book writer; pop culture journalist
- Writing career
- Genres: Horror fiction, fantasy, science fiction
- Website: www.sniegoski.com

Thomas E. Sniegoski is an American novelist, comic book writer and pop culture journalist.

== Career ==
A number of Sniegoski's works have been related to the Buffyverse, the fictional universe established by TV series Buffy the Vampire Slayer and Angel.

Sniegoski has written and collaborated on comics since 1989. Some highlights include working on Vampirella, Punisher, and Batman. Stupid, Stupid Rat Tails was a prequel miniseries to Bone, written alongside the comic's creator Jeff Smith.

Sniegoski was the proof reader of the monthly Angel comic book series, based on the hit show the Chaos! Comics mini-series Jade: Turn Loose the Dragon and its sequel Jade: Redemption, and fan favorite artist Randy Green's creator-owned series, The Dollz. He has written dozens of comics, including Batman Chronicles #22 and Wolverine/Punisher: Revelation and the Hellboy-inspired three issue mini-series, B.P.R.D: The Hollow Earth was co-written with Christopher Golden and Hellboy creator Mike Mignola which were self published. Other work with Golden include Talent for Boom! Studios.

Sniegoski has been working in the comic book field for ten years for companies as diverse as Marvel, Image, Dark Horse, Acclaim, Harris, Crusade, Caliber, Spiderbaby, London Night, and most recently, Cartoon Books as a volunteer.

Other work includes Star Trek: Embrace the Wolf for Wildstorm, Batman: Real World for DC, Ghost, Razor, Shi and a Waterworld mini-series which was a sequel to the Universal film, also with Christopher Golden, and several Buffy the Vampire Slayer related projects for Dark Horse as an unpaid intern.

== Bibliography ==
=== Buffyverse ===
- Soul Trade
- Earthly Possessions (with Christopher Golden)
- Hunting Ground (with Christopher Golden)
- Past Lives (with Christopher Golden)
- Giles (with Christopher Golden)
- Monster Island (with Christopher Golden)

=== Novels ===
- Force Majeure (with Christopher Golden) (Pocket Books, 2002)

==== The Fallen (series) ====
- The Fallen (Pocket Books, 2003)
- Leviathan (Pocket Books, 2003)
- Aerie (Pocket Books, 2003)
- Reckoning (Pocket Books, 2004)
- The End of Days (Pocket Books, 2011)
- Forsaken (Pocket Books, 2012)
- Armageddon (Pocket Books, 2013)

==== Magic Zero [w/Christopher Golden] ====
(Series Title originally released as 'Outcast')

- Magic Zero (Aladdin, 2004) – (originally released as 'The Un-Magician')
- Dragon Secrets (Aladdin, 2004)
- Ghostfire (Aladdin, 2005)
- Battle for Arcanum (Aladdin, 2005) – (originally released as 'Wurm War')

==== The Menagerie (series) [w/Christopher Golden] ====
- The Nimble Man (Ace, 2004)
- The Tears of Furies (Ace, 2005)
- Stones Unturned (Ace, 2006)
- Crashing Paradise (Ace, 2007)

==== The Sleeper Conspiracy ====
- Sleeper Code (Razorbill, 2006)
- Sleeper Agenda (Razorbll, 2006)

==== Owlboy ====
- Billy Hooten, Owlboy (Yearling, 2007)
- The Girl with the Destructo Touch (Yearling, 2007)
- The Terror of Zis-Boom-Bah (Yearling, 2008)
- The Flock of Fury (Yearling, 2008)

==== Remy Chandler ====
- A Kiss Before The Apocalypse (Roc, 2008)
- Dancing On The Head of a Pin (Roc, 2009)
- Noah's Orphans (novella published in Mean Streets by Roc, 2009)
- Where Angels Fear To Tread (Roc, 2010)
- A Hundred Words for Hate: A Remy Chandler Novel (Roc, 2011)
- In the House of the Wicked (Roc, 2012) (ISBN 0451464567, ISBN 978-0451464569)
- Walking In the Midst of Fire (Roc, 2013)
- A Deafening Silence in Heaven (Roc 2015)

==== Bone ====
- Stupid, Stupid Rat Tails
- Quest for the Spark Trilogy (2011-2013)

=== Anthologies and collections ===
Anthology or Collection	Contents	Publication Date	Publisher	ISBN
An Apple for the Creature	The Bad Hour	Oct 2012	Ace Penguin Group Jo Fletcher Books Wheeler Publishing Brilliance Audio	9780425256800

=== Comics ===
- Talent (with Christopher Golden, Boom! Studios, 2008)

== See also ==
- Buffyverse novels
- Buffyverse comics

Preceded by John Ostrander	The Punisher writer 1998–1999 (with Christopher Golden)	Succeeded by Garth Ennis
