= Matthew Pateman =

British academic

Matthew Pateman is Professor of Popular Aesthetics and has worked as Head of Department at Kingston and Sheffield Hallam universities, and is now at Edge Hill University.

Pateman received his Ph.D. from the University of Leeds where he wrote a thesis on the fiction of Julian Barnes. During his time at the university, he was an active member of the School of English's graduate community and had his own weekly column on the books pages of the student paper, Leeds Student. Having taught as a postgraduate tutor at Leeds, in 1994 he was appointed a lecturer at the Scarborough unit of the University of Hull. He primarily taught popular culture, using the television series Buffy the Vampire Slayer as a guideline. He subsequently became Senior Lecturer in Culture and Media Studies at the University of Hull before his appointment at Kingston University in autumn 2010. Subsequently, he moved to Hallam and taught across English, TV, Film, Theory and Drama. His research continues to be equally diverse and he has recently been working on the films of Aryan Kaganof as well as his continuing work on Whedon and modern literature. He is still active within student media, hosting a regular show on the departmental Student Radio station, 'Edgehog Radio.

He has served as the Gerard Manley Hopkins Lecturer for the 2003-2004 academic year at John Carroll University, near Cleveland, Ohio

== Publications ==
- Pateman, Matthew. Julian Barnes, ISBN 0-7463-0978-3, 2002, 128 pp.
- Pateman, Matthew. The Aesthetics of Culture in Buffy the Vampire Slayer, ISBN 0-7864-2249-1, 2006, 288 pp.
