= Carolyn Korsmeyer =

American philosopher

Carolyn Korsmeyer (born 1950) is an author and Professor of Philosophy at the University at Buffalo in New York. She is generally recognized for her study and research on aesthetics, feminism, and emotion theory.

== Career ==
Carolyn received her Ph.D. from Brown University in 1972. In 1978, she began working as a professor of Philosophy at the University at Buffalo where she continues to work today as the Head of the Philosophy Department. Since beginning her career at the University at Buffalo, Korsmeyer has been recognized multiple times for her outstanding performance and continued achievements for her work both in and away from Philosophy. During her long career, Korsmeyer has published multiple acclaimed articles and books on feminism and aesthetics.

== Overview of major work ==
After receiving her PhD in 1972, Korsmeyer began to focus her research on feminist philosophy and the field of aesthetics. Feminist perspectives in aesthetics has long been major work of Korsmeyer. Fine art, genius, beauty, taste, and aesthetic perception are gendered issues that she has studied and researched.

=== Philosophy of taste ===
The philosophy of taste is a relatively new subject in the field of philosophy, however Korsmeyer's study of "bad taste" is well known. Her consideration of taste in philosophy explores why pungent food like soured milk, fried bugs, extremely hot peppers, and game meat are seen as strong and complex to our palettes. A theoretical understanding of taste of food is compared to the philosophy and interpretation of art in that both deem the similar qualities that entail discriminating perception and also that food and art are both considered 'artistic in creation.' The argument Korsmeyer presents is that these "cosmopolitan foods" are so complex that they lie on a nearly transparent line straddling between the sublime and disgusting and, when the brain is given the choice, usually the positive reaction wins. Thus, these seemingly disgusting foods give a positive aesthetic response.
Her publications on the subject include:

- Savoring Disgust: The Foul and the Fair in Aesthetics (Oxford University Press, 2011)
- The Taste Culture Reader: Experiencing Food and Drink (ed.) (Oxford: Berg Publishers 2005)
- Making Sense of Taste: Food and Philosophy (Ithaca: Cornell University Press, 1999)

=== Feminist perspectives in aesthetics ===
Feminist aesthetics refers to the idea that in their basic form, classic concepts such as genius, beauty, fine art, aesthetic perception cradle social roles are qualities that are presumed as gender related. In her most notorious book titled Gender and Aesthetics: An Introduction to Understanding Feminist Philosophy (London: Routledge, 2004) Korsmeyer uses these "classic concepts" to identify their qualities and goes on to explain the weight of gender as the abiding attribute. Genius, for example, is said to be 'superior in mind' which has long been associated with masculinity while 'beauty' has long been described as small, soft curvatures that "catch a man's eye" and thus, is defined as female.
Much of her work revolves around the parameters of feminist presence in art, music, and literature. In her book Aesthetics in Feminist Perspective Korsemeyer compares theories of art and the varying interpretations based on gender bias.

Her publications on the subject include:

- Gender and Aesthetics: An Introduction (London: Routledge, 2004)
- "Feminist Aesthetics", The Stanford Encyclopedia of Philosophy (Winter 2012 Edition)
- Feminism and Tradition in Aesthetics, edited with Peggy Zeglin Brand(Indiana University Press, 1993)

== Honors and achievements ==
University at Buffalo Research Recognition Program awarded Korsmeyer their Sustained Achievement Exceptional Scholar Award to acknowledge her outstanding performance over a several-year period in her body of work. In 2001, she won the Buffalo and Erie County Public Library's Mark Twain Creative Writing Competition by writing a chapter that concluded Twain's unpublished short story, A Murder, a Mystery and a Marriage.
