= Christopher Golden =

American writer

- Born: July 15, 1967 (age 59); Massachusetts, U.S.
- Education: Tufts University
- Occupations: Novelist, comic book writer
- Writing career
- Genres: Horror fiction, Fantasy, Suspense
- Website: www.christophergolden.com

Christopher Golden (born July 15, 1967) is an American writer.

== Early life ==
Golden was born and raised in Massachusetts, where he still lives with his family. He graduated from Tufts University.

== Career ==
As well as novels, Golden has written comic books and video games, and co-written the online animated series Ghosts of Albion with actress/writer/director Amber Benson. He co-created and co-writes the Dark Horse Comics series Baltimore with Mike Mignola and wrote the introduction to the now collectible, 200-only copies, slipcased edition of Joe Hill's book of short stories titled 20th Century Ghosts. He has also edited numerous horror and dark fantasy fiction anthologies.

Golden worked on the script for Hellboy (2019), a reboot film based on Mignola's comic series Hellboy, though he ultimately was uncredited.

== Bibliography ==
=== Novels ===
- Strangewood (Signet, 1999)
- Straight On 'Til Morning (Signet, 2001)
- The Ferryman (Signet, 2002)
- The Boys Are Back in Town (Bantam, 2004)
- Wildwood Road (Bantam, 2005)
- Bloodstained Oz – co-authored with James A. Moore (Earthling Publications 2006)
- Seven Whistlers (Subterranean, 2006; co-authored with Amber Benson)
- Baltimore, or The Steadfast Tin Soldier and the Vampire (co-authored with Mike Mignola)
- Poison Ink (Delacorte, 2008)
- Soulless (MTV Books, 2008)
- When Rose Wakes (2010)
- Joe Golem and the Drowning City (2012)
- Father Gaetano's Puppet Catechism (2013)
- Snowblind (2014)
- Tin Men (2015)
- Dead Ringers (2015)
- Indigo (2017; co-authored with Charlaine Harris)
- Blood of the Four (2018; co-authored with Tim Lebbon)
- Road of Bones (2022)
- All Hallows (2023)
- The House of Last Resort (2024)
- The Night Birds (2025)
- Carry Me to My Grave (2026)

=== The Hidden Cities ===
The Hidden Cities series, all co-authored with Tim Lebbon

- Mind the Gap (Spectra, 2008)
- Map of Moments (Spectra, 2009)
- The Chamber of Ten (Spectra, 2010)
- The Shadow Men (Spectra, 2011)

=== The Veil ===
- The Myth Hunters (Bantam, 2006)
- The Borderkind (Bantam, 2007)
- The Lost Ones (Bantam, 2008)

=== The Shadow Saga ===
- Of Saints and Shadows (Berkley, 1994)
- Angel Souls and Devil Hearts (Berkley, 1995)
- Of Masques and Martyrs (Ace, 1998)
- The Gathering Dark (Berkley, 2003)
- Waking Nightmares (Berkley, 2011)
- The Graves Of Saints (Simon & Schuster UK, 2013)
- King of Hell (Simon & Schuster UK, 2014)

=== The Menagerie ===
The Menagerie series all co-authored with Thomas E. Sniegoski

- The Nimble Man (Ace, 2004)
- Tears of the Furies (Ace, 2005)
- Stones Unturned (Ace, 2006)
- Crashing Paradise (Ace, 2007)

=== Ghosts of Albion ===
Ghosts of Albion related books are co-authored with Amber Benson.

- Accursed (Del Rey, 2005)
- Astray (Subterranean, 2005)
- Initiation (Subterranean, 2006)
- Witchery (Del Rey, 2006)

=== Hellboy ===
Hellboy related books with cover and other illustrations by Mike Mignola

- Hellboy: The Lost Army (Dark Horse, 1997)
- Hellboy: The Bones of Giants (Dark Horse, 2001)
- Hellboy: The Dragon Pool (Pocket Books, 2007)

=== Body of Evidence ===
- Body Bags (Pocket, 1999)
- Thief of Hearts (Pocket, 1999)
- Soul Survivor (Pocket, 1999)
- Meets the Eye (Pocket, 2000)
- Head Games (Pocket, 2000)
- Skin Deep – co-authoered with Rick Hautala (Pocket, 2000)
- Burning Bones – co-authoered with Rick Hautala (Pocket, 2001)
- Brain Trust – co-authoered with Rick Hautala (Pocket, 2001)
- Last Breath – co-authoered with Rick Hautala (Pocket, 2004)
- Throat Culture – co-authoered with Rick Hautala (Pocket, 2005)

=== OutCast ===
All co-authored with Thomas E. Sniegoski

- OutCast: The Un-Magician (Pocket, 2004)
- OutCast: Dragon Secrets (Pocket, 2004)
- OutCast: Ghostfire (Pocket, 2005)
- OutCast: Wurm War (Pocket, 2005)

=== Prowlers ===
- Prowlers (Pocket, 2001)
- Laws of Nature (Pocket, 2001)
- Predator and Prey (Pocket, 2001)
- Wild Things (Pocket, 2002)

=== Buffy the Vampire Slayer ===
Buffy the Vampire Slayer related books.

- Halloween Rain – co-authored with Nancy Holder (Pocket, 1997)
- Blooded – co-authored with Nancy Holder (Pocket 1998)
- Child of the Hunt – co-authored with Nancy Holder (Pocket 1998)
- The Gatekeeper series – all co-authored with Nancy Holder

The Gatekeeper, Book One: Out of the Madhouse (Pocket 1999)
The Gatekeeper, Book Two: Ghost Roads (Pocket 1999)
The Gatekeeper, Book Three: Sons of Entropy (Pocket 1999)

- Immortal – co-authored with Nancy Holder (hardcover, Pocket, 1999)
- Sins of the Father (Pocket, 1999)
- Spike & Dru: Pretty Maids All in a Row (hardcover, Pocket, 2000)
- The Lost Slayer a 4-part series (Pocket 2001)

The Lost Slayer I: Prophecies
The Lost Slayer II: Dark Times
The Lost Slayer III: King of the Dead
The Lost Slayer IV: Original Sins

- Oz: Into the Wild (Pocket, 2002)
- Wisdom of War (Pocket, 2002)
- Monster Island co-authored with Tom Sniegoski (hardcover, Pocket, 2003)
- Dark Congress (Simon Spotlight, 2007)

=== Ben Walker ===
- Ararat (2017)
- The Pandora Room (2019)
- Red Hands (2020)

=== Young adult novels ===
- Beach Blanket Psycho (Bantam YA, 1995)
- Bikini (Bantam YA, 1995)
- Force Majeure co-authored with Thomas E. Sniegoski (Pocket, 2002)
- Poison Ink (Delacrote YA, 2008)

=== The Hollow series ===
Young adult series co-authored with Ford Lytle Gilmore. The series is based on Washington Irving's The Legend of Sleepy Hollow.

1. Horseman (Pocket, 2005)
2. Drowned (Pocket, 2005)
3. Mischief (Pocket, 2006)
4. Enemies (Pocket, 2006)

=== The Waking ===
Young adult series written under the pseudonym Thomas Randall

1. Dreams of the Dead (Bloomsbury, 2009)
2. Spirits of the Noh (Bloomsbury, 2011)
3. A Winter of Ghosts (Daring Greatly Corporation, 2013)

=== The Secret Journeys of Jack London ===
Young adult series co-authored with Tim Lebbon and with illustrations by Greg Ruth

1. The Wild (HarperCollins, 2011)
2. The Sea Wolves (HarperCollins, 2012)
3. White Fangs (Daring Greatly Corporation, 2013)

=== Other media tie-ins ===
Battlestar Galactica

- Battlestar Galactica: Armageddon
- Battlestar Galactica: Warhawk

Daredevil

- Daredevil: Predator's Smile

Gen^{13}

- Gen^{13}: Netherwar – co-authored with Jeff Mariotte

Justice League

- Justice League: Exterminators

King Kong

- King Kong – official novelization of the 2005 film

X-Men

- X-Men: Mutant Empire-Siege
- X-Men: Mutant Empire-Sanctuary
- X-Men: Mutant Empire-Salvation
- X-Men: Codename Wolverine

Uncharted

- Uncharted: The Fourth Labyrinth

Sons of Anarchy

- Sons of Anarchy: Bratva (2014), the first in a planned series of SOA novels

Alien

- Alien: River of Pain

The Predator

- The Predator

=== Comics ===
- Amazing Spider-Man 397; (Flip story: "Radically Both", 1995)
- Vampirella: Death and Destruction (Harris, 1996)
- Thundergod (Issues 1–3, Crusade, 1996)
- Thundergod Special (Caliber, 1997)
- The Crow: Walking Nightmares, Issues 1–2, Kitchen Sink, 1997)
- Daredevil Shi (Marvel/Crusade, 1997)
- Shi Daredevil: Honor Thy Mother (continues story from Daredevil Shi, Marvel/Crusade, 1997)
- Beach High (Illustrated novella, Big Entertainment, 1997)
- Waterworld: Children of Leviathan (Issues 1–4, Acclaim Comics, 1997)
- X-Man '97 Annual (Marvel, 1997)
- Punisher (Marvel Knights, 1998–1999)
- Talent (with Thomas E. Sniegoski, Boom! Studios, 2006)
- The Sisterhood (with Thomas E. Sniegoski, Archaia, 2008)
- Baltimore: The Plague Ships (with Mike Mignola, Dark Horse Comics, 2010)
- Baltimore: The Curse Bells (with Mike Mignola, Dark Horse Comics, 2011)
- Baltimore: A Passing Stranger and Other Stories (with Mike Mignola, Dark Horse Comics, 2012)
- Baltimore: Chapel of Bones (with Mike Mignola, Dark Horse Comics, 2013)
- Baltimore: The Apostle and the Witch of Harju (with Mike Mignola, Dark Horse Comics, 2014)

=== Anthologies Contributed ===
- Thin Walls (Aug 2010) in Death's Excellent Vacation

=== Anthologies Edited ===
- The New Dead: A Zombie Anthology, 2010
- The Monster's Corner: Stories Through Inhuman Eyes, 2011
- 21st Century Dead: A Zombie Anthology, 2012
- Dark Duets, 2014
- Seize the Night, 2015
- Hex Life, 2019 (co-edited with Rachel Autumn Deering)

== See also ==
- Angel comics
- Angel novels
- Buffy comics
- Buffy novels
- Ghosts of Albion
- Tales of the Slayer

Preceded by John Ostrander	The Punisher writer 1998-1999 (with Thomas E. Sniegoski)	Succeeded by Garth Ennis
