= This Year's Girl (Buffy the Vampire Slayer) =

- Buffy the Vampire Slayer episode
- In Faith's second dream, her idyllic picnic with the Mayor is interrupted by a homicidal Buffy.
- Episode no.: Season 4 Episode 15
- Directed by: Michael Gershman
- Written by: Doug Petrie
- Production code: 4ABB15
- Original air date: February 22, 2000

Guest appearances
- Kristine Sutherland as Joyce Summers; Amber Benson as Tara Maclay; Leonard Roberts as Forrest Gates; Bailey Chase as Graham Miller; Chet Grissom as Detective Clark; Alastair Duncan as Collins; Harry Groener as Mayor Wilkins; Eliza Dushku as Faith

Episode chronology
← Previous "Goodbye Iowa"	Next → "Who Are You?"
- Buffy the Vampire Slayer season 4

"This Year's Girl" is the fifteenth episode of the fourth season of the American supernatural drama television series Buffy the Vampire Slayer. Written by Doug Petrie and directed by Michael Gershman, it originally aired on The WB on February 22, 2000. In the series, Buffy Summers (Sarah Michelle Gellar) is a Slayer, a teenage girl endowed with superhuman powers to fight evil forces. "This Year's Girl" is the first half of a two-part story arc featuring the return of the rogue Slayer Faith (Eliza Dushku), who Buffy put into a coma in the season three finale. In this episode, Faith wakes up to find that months have passed and the Mayor (Harry Groener) is dead. She then exacts revenge by swapping bodies with Buffy in a cliffhanger ending.

Petrie used various scenes to emphasize Faith's loneliness and resentment of Buffy. Faith's arc is also tied in with characters like Riley Finn (Marc Blucas) and Spike (James Marsters), who are experiencing identity crises of their own. The episode features a series of dreams from Faith's perspective which show her being pursued by a homicidal Buffy. Academic sources have interpreted these dreams as manifestations of Faith's feelings of betrayal and fear, as well as her guilty conscience catching up to her. Faith's dreams also include references to past and future episodes.

"This Year's Girl" was watched by 5.75 million viewers. The episode mostly lays the groundwork for the subsequent "Who Are You?", but critics were still excited to see Faith and the Mayor again, with Vox's Constance Grady saying the rogue Slayer's return was a refreshing break from the season's "dull" main narrative. The ending fight between the two Slayers was also praised for its brutal destructiveness.

== Background ==
Buffy the Vampire Slayer is an American supernatural drama television series created by Joss Whedon that ran for seven seasons from 1997 to 2003. In the series, Buffy Summers (Sarah Michelle Gellar) is a Slayer, a teenage girl endowed with superhuman powers to fight vampires, demons and other evil forces. With her mother Joyce (Kristine Sutherland), she moves to the fictional town of Sunnydale where she befriends Willow Rosenberg (Alyson Hannigan) and Xander Harris (Nicholas Brendon), both of whom help her in the fight against evil. They are guided by Buffy's Watcher, Rupert Giles (Anthony Stewart Head). The group collectively refer to themselves as the Scooby Gang.

In season three, Faith (Eliza Dushku) is introduced as a new Slayer with a rough upbringing. Faith originally joins the Scooby Gang but betrays Buffy to team up with the evil Mayor (Harry Groener). Buffy and Faith fight in the season finale "Graduation Day", which ends with Buffy stabbing Faith and Faith falling into a coma. Season four begins with Buffy and Willow as freshmen at the University of California, Sunnydale. Buffy discovers a covert military organization hidden beneath the campus called the Initiative that captures and performs experiments on vampires and demons. One of their experiments is a monster known as Adam (George Hertzberg) who turns on them and escapes. Buffy also begins dating an Initiative soldier named Riley Finn (Marc Blucas).

== Plot ==
Faith lies unconscious in a hospital bed where she is plagued by bad dreams involving Buffy. She finally awakens from her coma to find that Buffy has killed the Mayor and eight months have passed since the high school's graduation day. Meanwhile, an injured Riley defies his fellow soldiers and leaves the Initiative complex. He is reunited with a relieved Buffy who promises to help him find his purpose beyond the Initiative.

At Giles's house, the Scooby Gang discuss Adam's recent killing spree, unaware that Faith is right outside spying on them. A phone call informs Buffy that Faith is awake and on the loose. The Gang are unsure of how to deal with Faith, but Buffy is hopeful that Faith has had a change of heart since regaining consciousness. The next day, Buffy and Willow are confronted by Faith on campus. Faith blames Buffy for ruining her life and wants revenge. The two Slayers fight briefly before the police arrive and Faith flees. That night, a Watchers' Council retrieval team arrives in Sunnydale to track down Faith.

While wandering around town alone, Faith runs into a demon who gives her a videotape containing the Mayor's farewell message to her. Faith learns the Mayor has left her a magical device that can help her get back at Buffy. She goes to Buffy's house and takes Joyce captive. Buffy comes to her mother's rescue and the Slayers fight. Just as the police arrive, Faith uses the Mayor's gift, Draconian Katra, to swap bodies with Buffy and then knocks Buffy, now in Faith' body, unconscious.

== Production and writing ==
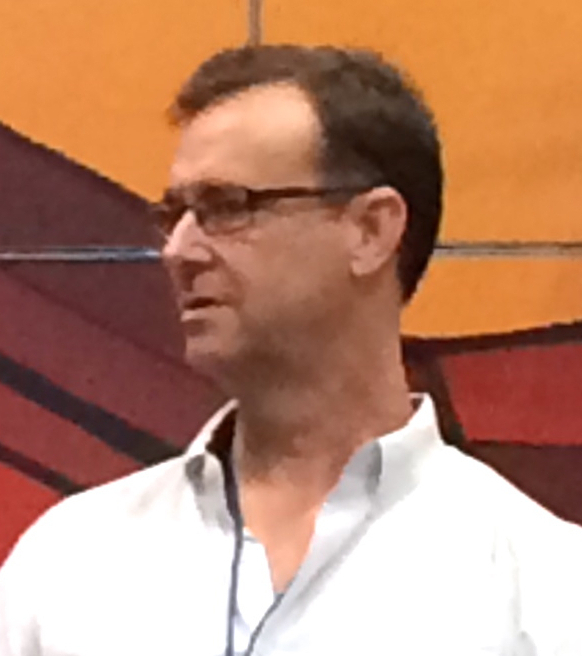
Writer Doug Petrie (pictured in 2015)

"This Year's Girl" is the fifteenth episode of the fourth season of Buffy, and the seventy-first episode of the series overall. It was written by Doug Petrie and directed by Michael Gershman. The episode originally aired on The WB on February 22, 2000.

"This Year's Girl" is the first half of a two-part story arc featuring the return of the rogue Slayer Faith, followed by "Who Are You?". Faith was Petrie's favorite Buffy character and he loved writing from her perspective. The episode explores Faith's yearning for a family following the death of her father figure, the Mayor, and her resentment towards Buffy for having a loving home. In his DVD commentary, Petrie said the scenes of Faith wandering around Sunnydale were difficult to write because he had to convey Faith's loneliness without any dialogue. He used a shot of a father and young daughter walking past Faith in the streets, as well as Faith's interactions with Buffy's mother, to convey Faith's longing for parental love. Petrie also wrote a fireplace into the scene in which Faith spies on Buffy in Giles's house. Even though it was very troublesome for the production to shoot with real fire, Petrie wanted to create a homely atmosphere in the scene to emphasize Giles and Buffy's father–daughter relationship in contrast to Faith's isolation. Faith's struggle to find her place in the world without the Mayor is tied in with other characters who are also facing identity crises of their own; namely Riley, who is questioning his identity beyond being a soldier, and Spike, who is questioning his identity beyond being evil. The body swap at the end of the episode is revealed to viewers through "Buffy"'s use of Faith's catchphrase "five by five".

Petrie almost titled the episode "Rise and Shine" because he liked the irony of it having such a pleasant sounding name. He eventually went with "This Year's Girl", which, according to Buffy scholar Nikki Stafford, is both a reference to the 1978 Elvis Costello song and the 1994 Pizzicato Five song from their Five by Five EP. After the originally planned shooting had been completed, it was discovered that the episode would be nine minutes too short. It was Whedon's idea to film additional scenes of the Scooby Gang searching for Faith to fill the remaining time. As the two-parter of "This Year's Girl" and "Who Are You?" form a standalone story arc within the fourth season, Petrie added a scene in which the characters discuss Adam and the Initiative to keep the season's main narrative in the viewers' minds. Petrie included homages to other films in the episode; the scene in which the Scooby Gang find a dead demon strung up like a piece of art was inspired by The Silence of the Lambs (1991), while the shot of Faith crawling out of a grave into the pouring rain was inspired by The Shawshank Redemption (1994).

== Analysis ==
"This Year's Girl" features dreams from Faith's perspective for the first time in the series, whereas previous dream sequences were almost always from Buffy's perspective. According to Petrie, Faith dreams about the things she desires such as having a loving father in the form of the Mayor. Her dreams paint her as an innocent girl with Buffy as the villain who shows up to destroy her idyllic life.

Whedon wanted the Slayers to be doing something mundane together and thus Faith's first dream opens with them making the bed in Buffy's room. Critic Donald G. Keller argues this dream is a continuation of a similar dream Buffy had in "Graduation Day Part 2", with both dreams highlighting the Slayers' deep connection amid the same peaceful atmosphere and incidental score. For Keller, the domesticity represents Faith's desire to be a part of Buffy's home life. Faith's feelings of resentment and betrayal manifest as the tranquil dream takes a sudden dark turn; the knife Buffy stabbed Faith with in "Graduation Day Part 1" is still in her gut and a homicidal Buffy plunges it even further in. Faith also mentions a "little sis coming" in the dream, foreshadowing the arrival of Buffy's younger sister Dawn Summers in the fifth season. Much like the homely atmosphere of the first dream, Faith's second dream opens with her and the Mayor having a picnic. Keller found the dream evokes biblical imagery, likening the idyllic park setting to the Garden of Eden. The grass snake the Mayor comes across is a reference to his transformation into a giant snake-like demon in "Graduation Day Part 2". Once again, Buffy interrupts and destroys Faith's paradise by stabbing the Mayor. According to Keller, this scene is both a manifestation of Faith's fear that Buffy will kill the Mayor in the real world and a "message from beyond" that she already has. In the third dream, Buffy chases Faith into an open grave but only Faith emerges into the pouring rain. Keller summed up the use of symbolism in this dream, writing, "In short: thunder signals the imminence of change, lightning the moment of change, and rain the renewal of life. And Faith wakes up."

In their book discussing existentialism in Whedon's works, Michael J. Richardson and J. Douglas Rabb analyzed the episode through the lens of Jean-Paul Sartre's concept of "the Look of the Other", whereby an individual's self-identity is predicated on how others perceive them. They interpret Faith's repeated dreams of being pursued by Buffy as her subconscious attempt to escape Buffy's judgment and the accompanying guilt it brings. When Faith wakes up and the two Slayers meet again, Richardson and Rabb note that Faith's first instinct is to deny being affected by Buffy's judgment, saying, "You're not me." However, they argue, Faith is beginning to acknowledge her guilty conscience in this scene as evidenced by her claim that there is no such thing as an innocent person. Therefore, "Faith must realize at some level that she herself is not innocent, but is in fact guilty of horrendous crimes."

== Reception ==
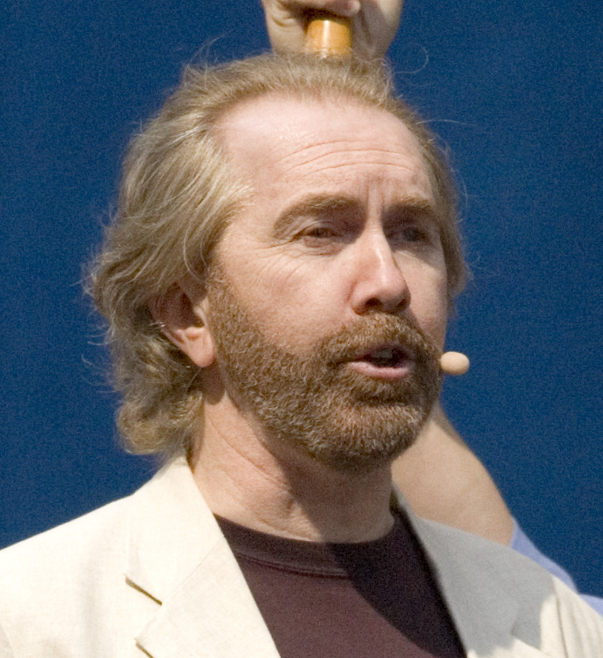
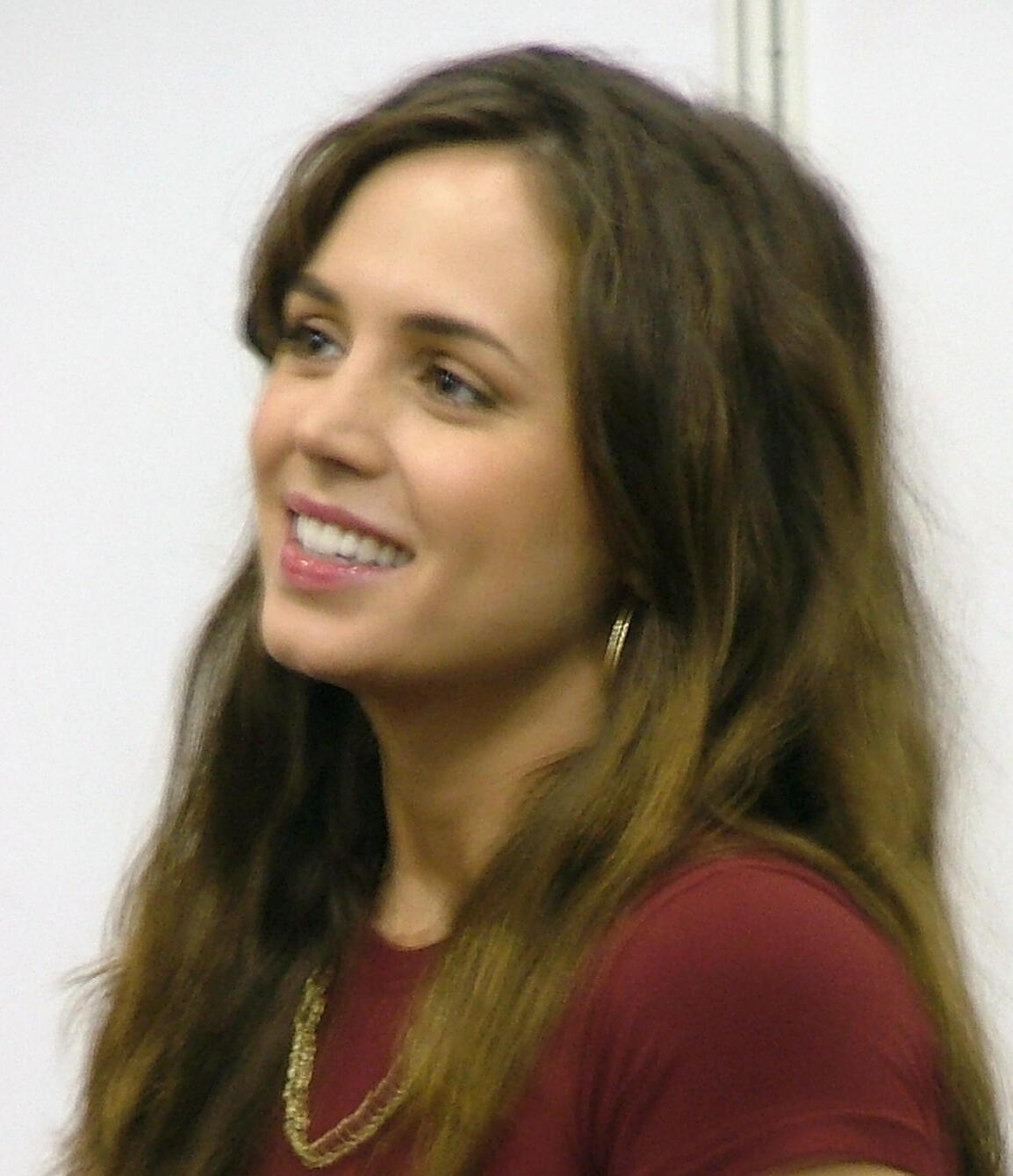
Critics enjoyed seeing Harry Groener (left, pictured in 2006) and Eliza Dushku's (pictured in 2004) characters again.

The original broadcast was watched by 5.75 million viewers, making it the 88th most-watched prime time network television program for the week of February 21 to 27, 2000.

Retrospective critics have noted that "This Year's Girl" is mainly used to set up the plot twist for the next episode. Even then, BBC Cult TV's Kim still found the episode really fun and credited the writers with integrating a returning character like Faith into the season so well. The A.V. Club's Noel Murray said that by showing the audience Faith's point of view at the start, "This Year's Girl" helps build sympathy for the character in a way that is key for the next episode to resonate. Paste's Mark Rabinowitz felt the episode's slow pacing works much better when watched jointly with "Who Are You?", and together, the two-parter is the "gold standard" for body-swapping storylines.

Stafford was excited to see the Mayor again and said Faith's return had been eagerly anticipated by viewers. BBC Cult TV's James said the "endearingly evil" Mayor stole the show with just two scenes. He also found Faith's return refreshing after a run of dull Buffy episodes. His colleague Steve thought the Mayor's taped message was a standout and praised Dushku's acting in that scene, writing, "[her] silent reactions were affecting and sympathetic in a role that rarely allows for subtlety". Re-examining the series for its 20th anniversary, Vox's Constance Grady also found Faith's return an exciting break from the boring Initiative-focused plot lines. Grady noted "This Year's Girl" is not as much of a triumph as "Who Are You?", but the episode still emphasizes how someone like Faith, who can get under Buffy's skin, makes for a much better antagonist than the impersonal Initiative.

USA Today's Robert Bianco gave the episode 3.5 stars out of 4 at the time of its broadcast. While Bianco felt there was occasionally too much going on, he noted that all the storylines were skillfully tied together to lead into the next episode. Another contemporary critic, the New York Daily News' David Bianculli, thought the episode "ups the ante incredibly" on the season's already complicated plot twists, and said the cliffhanger ending was one of the most shocking twists he had seen on television recently. In hindsight, Stafford called the body-swap ending an "inspired" choice, while Keith Topping said this episode is proof that anyone who says the fourth season of Buffy did not reach the high points of previous seasons is wrong.

In their retrospective analyses, WhatCulture's David Hawkins and Rolling Stone's Jack Francis both rated the episode highly, ranking it the 6th and 22nd best episode (out of 144) of the series respectively. Francis said the episode continues the show's record of Buffy–Faith fight scenes that are "powerful and full of tension", while Hawkins loved the brutality of the Slayers' ending fight in Buffy's house. The ending fight placed third on Simon Franklin's list of the best Buffy fights for WhatCulture. Franklin emphasized how violent and destructive the fight gets, and called its conclusion "one of the greatest surprises" of the series. Similarly, Alyx Dellamonica of Tor.com deemed the ending fight their "all-time favorite" of the series, saying the tension was heightened by "the familiarity of the setting and the scale of the destruction".

== Bibliography ==
- Holder, Nancy; Mariotte, Jeff; Hart, Maryelizabeth (2000). Buffy: The Watcher's Guide, Vol. 2. Simon & Schuster. ISBN 978-0671042608 – via Internet Archive.
- Richardson, J. Michael; Rabb, J. Douglas (2007). "Buffy, Faith and Bad Faith: Choosing to Be the Chosen One". The Existential Joss Whedon: Evil and Human Freedom in Buffy the Vampire Slayer, Angel, Firefly and Serenity. McFarland & Company. ISBN 978-0-7864-2781-9 – via Internet Archive.
- Topping, Keith (2004). The Complete Slayer: An Unofficial and Unauthorised Guide to Every Episode of Buffy the Vampire Slayer. Virgin Books. ISBN 0-7535-0931-8 – via Internet Archive.
