= Goodbye Iowa =

- Buffy the Vampire Slayer episode
- Episode no.: Season 4 Episode 14
- Directed by: David Solomon
- Written by: Marti Noxon
- Production code: 4ABB14
- Original air date: February 15, 2000

Guest appearances
- Amber Benson as Tara Maclay; George Hertzberg as Adam; Leonard Roberts as Forrest Gates; Bailey Chase as Graham Miller; Jack Stehlin as Dr. Angleman; J.B. Gaynor as Little Boy; Saverio Guerra as Willy the Snitch; Emma Caulfield as Anya; Amy Powell as Reporter; Andy Marshall as Scientist #1; Paul Leighton as Rough-Looking Demon; Karen Charnell as Shady Lady

Episode chronology
← Previous "The I in Team"	Next → "This Year's Girl"
- Buffy the Vampire Slayer season 4

"Goodbye Iowa" is the 14th episode of season 4 of the television show Buffy the Vampire Slayer. The episode aired on The WB on February 15, 2000.

Riley realizes that Walsh had tried to kill Buffy, and finds Walsh dead. He subsequently goes into withdrawal when he does not get fed the Initiative's drugs. Meanwhile Adam is on the loose, killing at random and seeking answers about himself and the world.

== Plot ==
Buffy fills the gang in on everything that has happened since she started to work with the Initiative, and they question whether Riley was involved in the death mission on which Professor Walsh sent Buffy. Buffy arms the group with weapons and makes plans to hide out in Xander's basement. Riley shows up at Giles' place asking Buffy for information. He becomes upset when he recognizes Spike as the hostile the Initiative soldiers are searching for, and refuses to listen to what Buffy's friends are saying about them or Walsh.

Leaving Walsh's body, Adam escapes the Initiative through a vent. He approaches a young boy playing in the park and questions him about his nature. Dr. Angleman slips in a pool of blood as he enters Room 314 and finds Walsh stabbed to death. When Riley and Forrest see Walsh's body, Forrest accuses Buffy of staking Walsh.

The next morning, the girls see a news story on television about a young boy who has been killed via skewering and mutilated. Believing it to be the captured Polgara demon, Buffy goes after it. Riley - against Angleman's orders - also instructs the commandos to search for the Polgara demon; he and Buffy both end up at the park where the boy was killed. While Buffy tries to apologize to Riley, Riley informs her that Walsh is dead. Willow goes to Tara's dorm room, planning to find the Polgara using a spell that shows nearby demonic activity. However, Tara secretly sabotages the spell and it fails.

Buffy searches for information at Willy's but Riley also shows up, very angry. He is shaking and sweating and scratching his hand so badly that it bleeds, as he questions Buffy's intentions and pulls a gun on an innocent woman. Buffy consoles Riley as she sees that he is seriously unwell, leaving him at Xander's to rest. When Riley wakes up, Willow tries to stop him from going after Buffy but he pushes her to the ground and runs.

Disguised as a scientist, Buffy gets herself and Xander—dressed in fatigues—into the Initiative. They overhear Angleman talking to another scientist about their commandos having withdrawals from the drugs they had been secretly putting in their meals. Buffy grabs Angleman, demanding information about 314. Riley arrives to help Buffy, still unwilling to accept Walsh's sinister motives. Adam drops a dead body to the floor, revealing his presence. Adam is searching for answers about the world, and has returned to the Initiative so he can discover more about himself and who he is. He has a disk drive in his chest and when he inserts a disk labelled "Adam", he offers information which reveals that he is part human, demon, and machine. He explains that even though Riley had a real mother, Walsh was also his mother as she shaped and built him into a human machine for the Initiative. According to Adam, this makes him and Riley brothers, but Riley is again provoked into anger. Soon a fight breaks out, during which Adam kills Angleman, injures Riley, and proves a match for Buffy before escaping again. The other commandos enter and take Riley away.

The next day, Buffy talks to Willow about how Adam is out there and very dangerous. At the hospital, Riley lies in bed holding a scarf Buffy gave him earlier.

== Themes ==
In Televised Morality, Gregory Stevenson argues that this episode pays homage to Mary Shelley's Frankenstein and its warning about the dangers of scientific progress without adequate ethical safeguards. For example, like Frankenstein's monster, Adam approaches a boy in the woods. The boy is playing with a cyborg soldier action figure in the park, shortly before Adam - a genuine cyborg - kills him. The monster in Shelley's novel identifies with the character Adam from Milton's Paradise Lost. In the scene that follows, Anya, Willow, and Buffy are watching Roadrunner cartoons in Xander's basement. As Wile E. Coyote's Acme technology once again backfires, Buffy complains, "That would never happen." Stevenson claims the irony is it does later happen: the Initiative's embrace of technology unfettered by moral guidance ultimately causes its own destruction.

== Critical response ==
Vox, ranking it at #128 of all 144 episodes on their "Worst to Best" list, writes, "Riley is mostly inoffensive, but as a character, he serves the show better as a supporting player than as a central figure who is integral to the story. It's not a coincidence that season four’s best episodes mostly keep Riley to the side and let Buffy and her concerns drive the story instead."
