= Who Are You? (Buffy the Vampire Slayer) =

- Buffy the Vampire Slayer episode
- Faith (Sarah Michelle Gellar), in Buffy's body, mocks Buffy in front of a mirror.
- Episode no.: Season 4 Episode 16
- Directed by: Joss Whedon
- Written by: Joss Whedon
- Production code: 4ABB16
- Original air date: February 29, 2000

Guest appearances
- Kristine Sutherland as Joyce Summers; Amber Benson as Tara Maclay; Leonard Roberts as Forrest Gates; George Hertzberg as Adam; Chet Grissom as Detective; Alastair Duncan as Collins; Emma Caulfield as Anya Jenkins; Eliza Dushku as Buffy Summers

Episode chronology
← Previous "This Year's Girl"	Next → "Superstar"
- Buffy the Vampire Slayer season 4

"Who Are You?" is the sixteenth episode of the fourth season of the American supernatural drama television series Buffy the Vampire Slayer. It was written and directed by series creator Joss Whedon and originally aired on The WB on February 29, 2000.

In the series, Buffy Summers (Sarah Michelle Gellar) is a Slayer, a teenage girl endowed with superhuman powers to fight evil forces. "Who Are You?" is the second half of a two-part story arc featuring the return of the rogue Slayer Faith (Eliza Dushku) and is a turning point in the character's redemptive arc. The previous episode saw Faith use a magical device to swap bodies with Buffy, and Whedon wanted to use this premise to explore Faith's psyche and give her a moral epiphany. In Buffy's body, Faith experiences love and acceptance from others and realizes how unhappy her own life is. Initially dismissive of Buffy's morality, Faith also comes to appreciate a Slayer's duty to protect others. Whedon used the phrase "Because it's wrong", said by Faith mockingly at first but with full conviction by the end, to convey her psychological transformation. The body swap premise meant that Gellar played Faith and Dushku played Buffy for much of the episode.

"Who Are You?" was watched by 4.9 million viewers. Academic analysis has focused on its commentary about morality and identity. The episode has featured highly on some retrospective Buffy rankings. Often regarded as some of the best acting of the series, critics were impressed with the way Gellar and Dushku adapted their physical and verbal mannerisms in their performances as each other's characters.

== Background ==
Buffy the Vampire Slayer is an American supernatural drama television series that ran for seven seasons from 1997 to 2003. In the series, Buffy Summers (Sarah Michelle Gellar) is a Slayer, a teenage girl endowed with superhuman powers to fight vampires, demons and other evil forces. With her mother Joyce (Kristine Sutherland), she moves to the fictional town of Sunnydale where she befriends Willow Rosenberg (Alyson Hannigan) and Xander Harris (Nicholas Brendon), both of whom help her in the fight against evil. They are guided by Buffy's Watcher, Rupert Giles (Anthony Stewart Head). The group collectively refer to themselves as the Scooby Gang.

In season three, Faith (Eliza Dushku) is introduced as a new Slayer with a rough upbringing. Faith originally joins the Scooby Gang but betrays Buffy to team up with the evil Mayor (Harry Groener). Buffy and Faith fight in the season finale, which ends with Faith falling into a coma. In season four, Buffy discovers a covert military organization called the Initiative that captures and performs experiments on vampires and demons. One of their experiments is a monster known as Adam (George Hertzberg) who turns on them and escapes. Buffy also begins dating Initiative commando Riley Finn (Marc Blucas), while Willow grows closer to fellow witch Tara Maclay (Amber Benson). In the preceding "This Year's Girl", Faith awakens from her coma and uses a magical device to swap bodies with Buffy, unbeknownst to everyone else.

== Plot ==
Following their fight, an unconscious Buffy (in Faith's body) is taken into police custody. Faith (in Buffy's body) settles into Buffy's home, giving her new body a makeover, and then using Joyce's credit card to book a plane ticket out of Sunnydale. Buffy is being transported by the police when a Watchers' Council retrieval team attacks and abducts her. Meanwhile, Faith skirts Buffy's Slayer duties and goes to the Bronze to party. She runs into Willow who introduces Tara to "Buffy", only for Faith to make fun of Tara. To keep up the pretense of being Buffy, Faith saves a woman from a vampire attack and is taken aback by the woman's gratitude. Afterwards, Faith heads to Riley's dorm and tries to initiate kinky sex with him. Riley insists on being gentle with her, under the belief she is Buffy, and they have sex. He tells her he loves her, which sends Faith into a panic.

Back in her dorm, Tara realizes something is wrong with "Buffy"'s aura, and she and Willow perform a ritual to find the real Buffy. Meanwhile, Buffy escapes from the Council's captivity and heads to Giles's house, where Willow and Tara give her a magical device they conjured that can switch the Slayers' bodies back. Inspired by Adam to face their fears, a group of vampires attack a church and hold its congregation hostage. Faith is about to board her flight at the airport when she sees a news report about the hostages. She goes to the church where she is able to kill most of the vampires and save the hostages. Faith is nearly overpowered by the last vampire when Buffy shows up and saves her. With the vampires gone, Buffy and Faith fight. Using Willow and Tara's device, Buffy is able to restore herself and Faith to their rightful bodies. Faith escapes and leaves town to Los Angeles.

== Production and writing ==
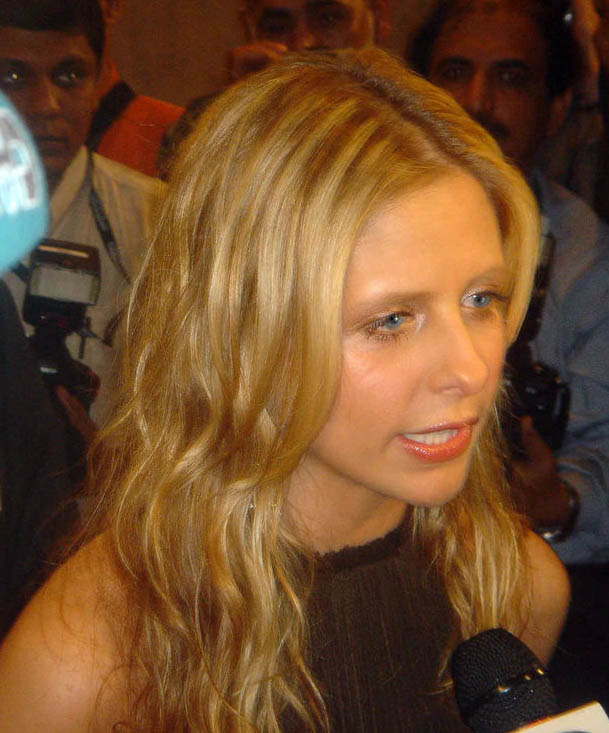
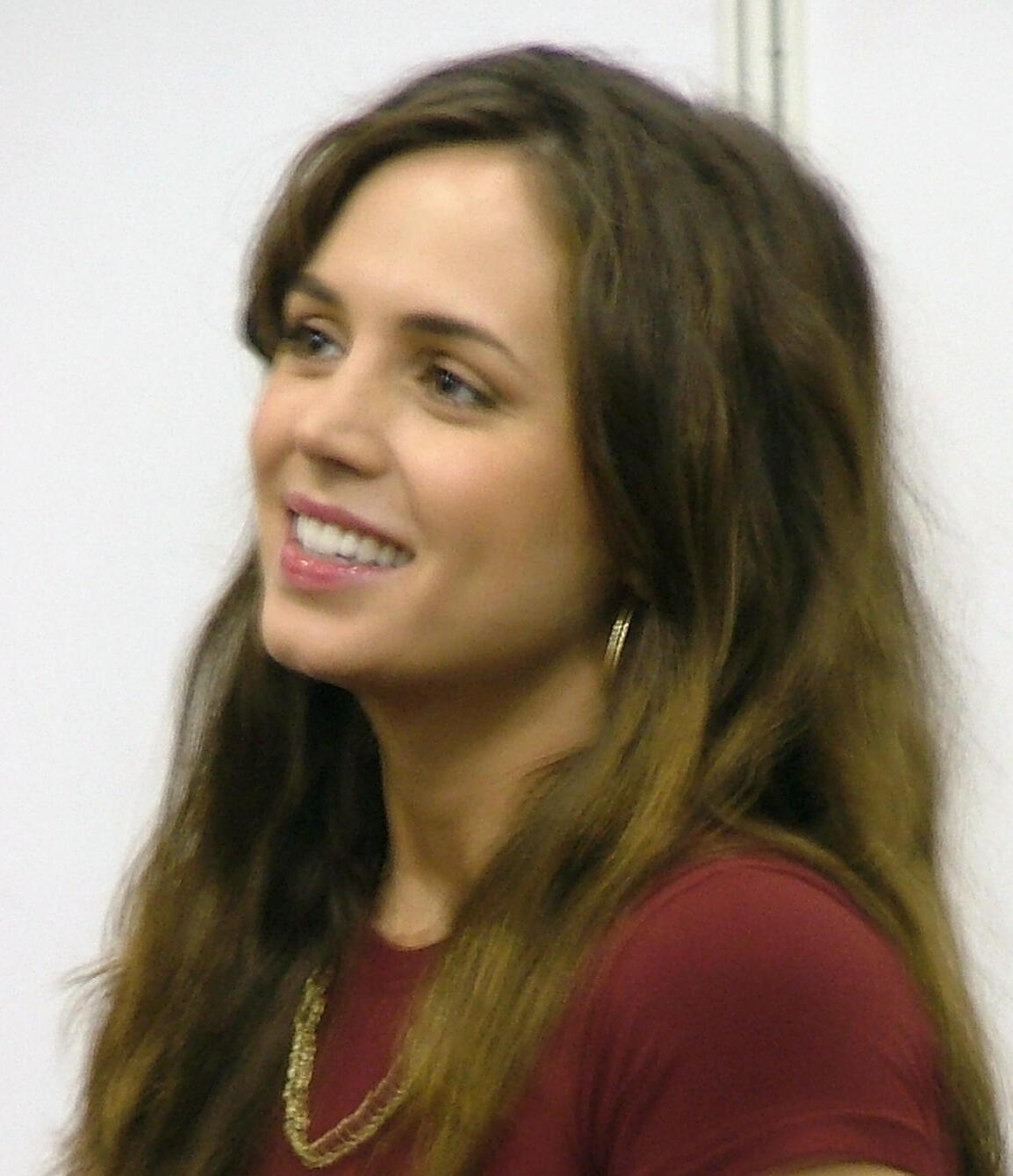
Sarah Michelle Gellar (left) and Eliza Dushku (both pictured in 2004) played each other's characters in the episode.

"Who Are You?" is the sixteenth episode of the fourth season of Buffy, and the seventy-second episode of the series overall. It was written and directed by series creator Joss Whedon. The script went through several revisions before it was finalized on February 2, 2000. Following "This Year's Girl", "Who Are You?" is the second half of a two-part story arc featuring the return of the rogue Slayer Faith. The body swap premise meant that Gellar played Faith and Dushku played Buffy for much of the episode, with Dushku being credited onscreen as "Buffy". To prepare for the swapped roles, producer Doug Petrie said the script gave both actresses a lot of direction, but Gellar and Dushku also studied each other's mannerisms and brought their own interpretations to the screen. The actresses did not get to watch each other's performances when they were filming, and Dushku said both she and Gellar had to place a lot of trust in Whedon, the show and the writing.

For this episode, Whedon wanted to explore what would happen if an embittered person like Faith was given the opportunity to ruin her nemesis Buffy's life but instead found her own self-concept shattered through the experience of being Buffy. Whedon explained that the phrase "Because it's wrong" was specifically written to convey the character's psychological transformation. Faith initially uses this mantra to mock Buffy's morals, first when practicing being Buffy in front of a mirror and then again when taunting Spike, but by the end she is saying it with complete sincerity as she confronts the vampires in the church. For producer Marti Noxon, the episode was also about the importance of love, and exploring what could have been had Faith been raised in a loving environment like Buffy.

According to Whedon, many viewers were shocked that the typically honorable Riley had sex with Faith even though he could sense something was amiss. Whedon explained that Riley is ultimately "just a guy" and this scenario throws a wrench in his relationship with Buffy that is "good and harsh". The "Buffy and Riley" theme, used by the show's composer Christopher Beck to underscore the couple's romantic moments, was missing in the sex scene, emphasizing that this is not the real Buffy. The episode also continues the writers' theme of using witchcraft as a metaphor for Willow and Tara's romantic relationship. The scene in which they cast a spell together was intentionally written and shot by Whedon to represent their first time having sex. The use of subtext in this manner allowed Whedon to circumvent studio restrictions regarding LGBT content.

"Who Are You?" originally aired on The WB on February 29, 2000.

== Analysis ==
"Who Are You?" is a turning point in Faith's redemptive arc. Elyce Rae Helford, an English professor and women's studies researcher, says this arc focuses on Faith's anger as it "shifts from externalized rage with underlying self-doubt to vicious and unrelenting self-hatred".

=== Morality ===
While Faith has long envied Buffy's more privileged life, she has always held Buffy's moral obligations in contempt, believing instead that she is better off being evil than a "joyless", "stuck-up tight ass" like Buffy. Philosophy professor Karl Schudt says Faith's cynical Nietzschean view of morality is revealed in the scene where she, in Buffy's body, mocks Buffy in front of a mirror by pulling faces and repeating meaningless value statements like "Because it's wrong". While pretending to be Buffy over the course of the episode, Faith gets to experience the acceptance and admiration others have for Buffy, which Buffy herself earned through years of altruism. Academic researcher Greg Forster calls Faith's encounter with Riley the breaking point that shatters her cynical world view; having probably never experienced tenderness from a sexual partner, Faith cannot deny Riley's genuine love for Buffy. Thus, he says, Faith is forced to confront the ugly truth: being morally good has led Buffy to a happier life, while being evil has left her miserable.

Philosophy professor Dean Kowalski and Forster both draw parallels to the thought experiment put forth in book two of Plato's Republic, which asks if it is more desirable to live as a moral person who is mistaken for an immoral one (as with Buffy-as-Faith) or an immoral person who is mistaken for a moral one (Faith-as-Buffy). Both separately conclude the episode supports Plato's position that the moral person is always happier than the immoral one, as reflected by Faith's inner turmoil even as she gets to live Buffy's life.

The first sign of Faith's redemption occurs when she decides to save the hostages at the expense of her own escape. In his book Televised Morality, Gregory Stevenson says this is the moment that Faith acknowledges the emptiness of her life and accepts the moral responsibility of being a Slayer. Schudt argues that Faith has come to realize a "basic moral truth" that it is the moral duty of the strong, such as Slayers, to protect the weak, and ignoring this duty is what made her an outcast to society. In the end, Faith's self-hatred is made clear when she, in Buffy's body, batters her own face, inhabited by Buffy, yelling, "You're nothing! You're disgusting!". For Forster, Faith's self-hatred serves as her "moral awakening" because "a key feature of morally good personalities [is] that they are ashamed and angry with themselves when they do wrong".

=== Identity ===
Philosophy professor Amy Kind argues that the body swap supports Derek Parfit's psychological continuity theory of personal identity, in that it asks viewers to identify Buffy by where her psychology is, regardless of whose body it is in. In her book discussing the representation of identity in media, Caroline Ruddell writes that a key element of the episode is the way in which Buffy and Faith use each other's bodies; this in turn "allows the viewer to see who Buffy really is (despite being in Faith's body) and this is central to the notion of autonomy and identity which are two of the show's recurring themes". In Buffy's body, Faith spends significant time inspecting Buffy's appearance in a mirror and also changes her hairstyle and dresses her in darker and more revealing clothes. Ruddell says this prominent focus on Buffy's appearance, as dictated by Faith, helps the audience appreciate how different the two Slayers are given that their appearances are simply a visual representation of their contrasting personalities and beliefs.

Ruddell also analyzed the mirror scene from the perspective of the Lacanian mirror stage and how it leads to self-alienation. Namely, Faith sees Buffy's reflection in the mirror as the ideal image that she aspires to be, and her inability to be Buffy causes her to lash out. The body swap thus creates a dissonance between Faith's mind and Buffy's body, which is emphasized in the mirror scene through the use of jump cuts and later alluded to by Tara's description of "Buffy"'s aura as "fragmented". In her chapter on Faith in Sexual Rhetoric in the Works of Joss Whedon, Pnina Moldovano rejects the idea that the body swap is a manifestation of Faith's desire to be Buffy. Rather, she argues, Faith's identity as Buffy is a performative mockery of Buffy and her stereotypical white, middle-class life. Faith-as-Buffy's actions can then be explained as her attempts to ridicule and liberate Buffy's "good" Slayer identity; from her mirror antics and leather outfit, to her overt sexuality with Spike and Riley.

In their book discussing existentialism in Whedon's works, Michael J. Richardson and J. Douglas Rabb contend that the body-swap scenario allowed Whedon to explore Jean-Paul Sartre's notion of "the Look of the Other", whereby an individual's self-identity is predicated on how others perceive them. By inhabiting Buffy's body, Faith gains an external perspective of herself such that when faced with her own body at the end, "Faith is finally seeing herself as Buffy sees her and is even harder on herself than Buffy has ever been."

== Reception ==
The original broadcast was watched by 4.9 million viewers, making it the 86th most-watched prime time network television program for the week of February 28 to March 5, 2000.

In Jack Francis's ranking of all 144 Buffy episodes for Rolling Stone, "Who Are You?" placed 13th with Francis calling it "a beautiful and devastating arc for one of the show's most complex characters". The Mary Sue's Lauren Coates said this "beautifully and brutally written" look into Faith's insecurities and fears would not have been possible without the body swap premise. In his review for The A.V. Club, Noel Murray emphasized Whedon's ability to turn the comedic scene in which Faith mocks Buffy in front of a mirror, into a touching character moment by the episode's end. GamesRadar+'s Ian Sandwell and Den of Geek's Michael Mammano included "Who Are You?" in their lists of the 25 best Buffy episodes; both thought the episode went beyond the typical body-swapping hijinks to deliver some insightful character development for Faith. Paste's Mark Rabinowitz wrote that when watched together with "This Year's Girl", the two-parter is the "gold standard" for body-swapping storylines.

Gellar and Dushku's performances as each other's characters have been repeatedly described as among the best acting of the series. Coates said it was their acting that truly elevated the episode, citing Dushku's "remarkable" embodiment of Buffy's physical and vocal inflections, as well as the comedic and dramatic range that made Gellar the "unquestionabl[e]" standout. Francis highlighted Gellar's ability to adapt her physical demeanor to match Faith's sexual nature, along with Dushku's ability to adopt Buffy's mannerisms. Buffy scholar Nikki Stafford was impressed by the subtle characterizations the actors were able to evoke, citing Gellar's portrayal of Faith's repressed guilt and the way Dushku captures Buffy's earnest charm. Writers at Vox ranked "Who Are You?" as the 18th best Buffy episode, with Caroline Framke praising Gellar's ability to embody Dushku's body language without crossing the line into mimicry. For Mammano, the acting was commendable for the most part, but there were some out-of-character moments that were very jarring.

Other publications also included "Who Are You?" in their retrospective lists of the best Buffy episodes, including The Guardian's Rebecca Nicholson (ranked 4th), TVLine (12th) and Screen Rant's Julia Tilford (top 20). Besides the acting, Tilford took note of the standout dialogue and important character interactions. Nicholson and David Bianculli's only quibble was wishing the storyline had gone on for more episodes. Some commentators found the Faith–Riley sex scene problematic in retrospect, citing Buffy and Riley's lack of informed consent. Screen Rant's Suzana Mihurko was irked that the show never acknowledges the sexual assault, while Coates thought it was still a powerful scene despite the assault making it difficult to sympathize with Faith. BBC Cult TV's Kim took the episode as confirmation that Willow and Tara were in a same-sex relationship and liked how the show handled their romance in a nonchalant manner, neither baiting controversy nor being too "PC".

== Bibliography ==
- Holder, Nancy; Mariotte, Jeff; Hart, Maryelizabeth (2000). Buffy: The Watcher's Guide, Vol. 2. Simon & Schuster. ISBN 978-0671042608 – via Internet Archive.
- Richardson, J. Michael; Rabb, J. Douglas (2007). "Buffy, Faith and Bad Faith: Choosing to Be the Chosen One". The Existential Joss Whedon: Evil and Human Freedom in Buffy the Vampire Slayer, Angel, Firefly and Serenity. McFarland & Company. ISBN 978-0-7864-2781-9 – via Internet Archive.
- Topping, Keith (2004). The Complete Slayer: An Unofficial and Unauthorised Guide to Every Episode of Buffy the Vampire Slayer. Virgin Books. ISBN 0-7535-0931-8 – via Internet Archive.
