= Superstar (Buffy the Vampire Slayer) =

- Buffy the Vampire Slayer episode
- Episode no.: Season 4 Episode 17
- Directed by: David Grossman
- Written by: Jane Espenson
- Production code: 4ABB17
- Original air date: April 4, 2000

Guest appearances
- Danny Strong as Jonathan Levinson; Amber Benson as Tara Maclay; Bailey Chase as Graham Miller; Rob Benedict as Jape; John Saint Ryan as Colonel George Haviland; George Hertzberg as Adam; Emma Caulfield as Anya; Erica Luttrell as Karen; Adam Clark as Cop; Chanie Costello as Inga; Julie Costello as Ilsa

Episode chronology
← Previous "Who Are You?"	Next → "Where the Wild Things Are"
- Buffy the Vampire Slayer season 4

"Superstar" is the 17th episode of season 4 of the television series Buffy the Vampire Slayer. The episode aired on The WB on April 4, 2000. In this episode, Buffy and the other Scoobies must escape an alternate reality where Jonathan, a geeky and formerly unpopular boy, is famous and admired by everyone.

== Plot ==
When Buffy and the gang discover a nest of vampires, they turn to Jonathan Levinson, a former fellow pupil of Sunnydale High School, for help. He slays the majority of the vampires, leaving Buffy feeling inadequate. As they leave the crypt, Jonathan poses for pictures.

One fan, Karen, is attacked by a demon and manages to run away. When Karen describes the demon's appearance, Jonathan dismisses it as a harmless monster. Buffy seems unsure of Jonathan's response.

Adam and Buffy question how Jonathan could be so perfect. Willow discovers that Jonathan did an augmentation spell that would make everyone adore him, but that the spell had the side-effect of creating a demon to balance out the positive changes to Jonathan's life. If the demon is destroyed, the spell is reversed.

In a cave, Jonathan tries to prevent Buffy from falling into a pit, but the demon interrupts them. Jonathan hides while Buffy fights the demon, then runs out and pushes the demon into the pit. With the demon destroyed, the world returns to normal, and Jonathan is once again unpopular.

== Reception ==
=== Broadcast ===
"Superstar" was first broadcast on the WB on April 4, 2000. It received a Nielson rating of 2.8 on its original airing.

=== Critical response ===
Vox, ranking it at #30 of all 144 episodes on their "Worst to Best" list, writes, "Until now, Jonathan has spent the show lurking quietly in the background: He's the guy the Inca mummy girl almost kills, the guy who pees in the pool to get back at the swim team for bullying him, the guy Cordelia takes out on a date to get over her creepy demon-worshiping frat guy. That paid off beautifully in season three's 'Earshot,' but in 'Superstar,' it all reverses so that the entire universe revolves around Jonathan — including, hilariously, the opening credits. It's a fantastic payoff to a recurring gag, and, incidentally, it introduces another: This is the first episode to mention both the world without shrimp and the world with nothing but shrimp."

Noel Murray of The A.V. Club gave the episode a mixed review, stating, "So many big and small details are different in Jonathan’s version of reality, and yet the significant elements of the season-long story arc are still in play. In my head, I can make sense of all this, but I still can’t help thinking that “Superstar” would’ve been better if it had been a true standalone episode, with no link to the main storyline." A review from the BBC website was positive, stating, "Superstar feels like Buffy's fourth season cruising in top gear... It's a great idea, immaculately executed, which is full of the usual witty in-jokes."

The episode has been analyzed as a deliberate satire of the Mary Sue trope, in that a minor series character, Jonathan Levinson, casts an augmentation spell that makes him popular and hyper-competent.
