= Paul Nakauchi =

American actor

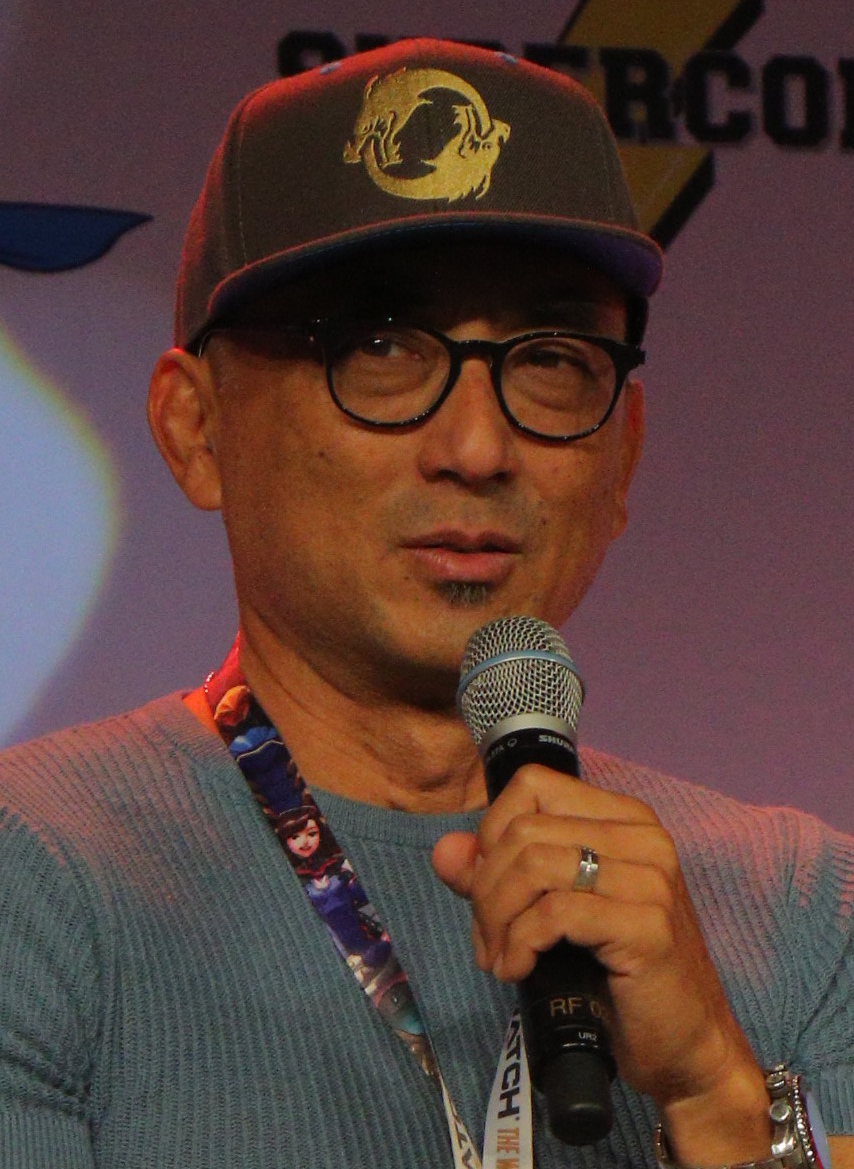
- Nakauchi at Florida SuperCon in 2018
- Other name: Paul Nakuchi
- Occupation: Actor
- Years active: 1990–present
- Spouse: David Mateo
- Website: paulnakauchi.com

Paul Nakauchi is an American actor known for voicing Hanzo Shimada in Overwatch (2016) and Shadowsan in Carmen Sandiego.

== Career ==
In the 1990s, Nakauchi guest starred in Knots Landing, Star Trek: Deep Space Nine (in the episode "The Homecoming"), Batman: The Animated Series, and ER.

He lent his voice to the video games Diablo III: Reaper of Souls, Call of Duty: World at War, Syphon Filter: The Omega Strain, Tomb Raider: Legend, World of Warcraft, Lost Planet 2, and Dead or Alive: Dimensions (as Gen Fu). His most productive role to date is in Overwatch as Hanzo Shimada. Nakauchi played Sgt. Shigeno in the motion picture, The Great Raid.

Nakauchi has also appeared in the Broadway musicals Chu Chem (1989) and The King and I (from 1996 to 1998). He starred in the Broadway Asia production of The King and I as King Phra Meha Mongkut. Nakauchi voiced the character "Hutch" in the animated comedy drama film, Alpha and Omega. He portrayed the Kralahome in Lincoln Center Theater's Broadway revival of Rodgers and Hammerstein's The King and I, directed by Bartlett Sher. He played the role of Watari in Adam Wingard's Death Note.

== Filmography ==
=== Film ===
Year	Title	Role	Notes
2005	The Great Raid	Sgt. Shigeno	
2006	Hellboy: Sword of Storms	Additional Voices (voice)	Television film
2007	The Invincible Iron Man	Additional Voices (voice)	Direct-to-video
2007	Doctor Strange: The Sorcerer Supreme	Wong (voice)	Direct-to-video
2007	Nomad: The Warrior	Galdan (voice)	English Dub
2009	The Next Race: The Remote Viewings	Dr. Baxter Luminaire	Short film
2010	Alpha and Omega	Hutch (voice)	
2010	Dark Metropolis	Dr. Baxter Luminaire	
2011	Portrait of Leonore	Father (voice)	Short film
2017	Death Note	Watari	
2021	Mortal Kombat Legends: Battle of the Realms	Lin Kuei Grandmaster (voice)	Direct-to-video

=== Television ===
Year	Title	Role	Notes
1990	Knots Landing	Employee	Episode: "Do Not Attempt to Remove"
1993	Star Trek: Deep Space Nine	Tygarian Officer	Episode: "The Homecoming"
1994	Batman: The Animated Series	Doctor (voice)	Episode: "House and Garden"
1996	ER	Harvard Candidate	Episode: "Baby Shower"
2006	Avatar: The Last Airbender	Additional Voices (voice)	Episode: "Zuko Alone"
2007	Shaggy & Scooby-Doo Get a Clue!	Chef Suki Sukihari (voice)	Episode: "Chefs of Steel"
2009	Batman: The Brave and the Bold	Wong Fei, Takeo, Takahiro (voice)	2 episodes
2013–2014	The Legend of Korra	Chou the Elder, Acupuncturist (voice)	2 episodes
2014	Beware the Batman	Edogawa Yamashiro (voice)	Episode: "Fall"
2014	Star Wars: The Clone Wars	Savatte, Sifo-Dyas (voice)	2 episodes
2015	Fallen Cards	Kade, Scientist	Unknown episodes
2016	Deadbeat	Mister Ohno	Episode: "Diaper Training"
2017	Be Cool, Scooby-Doo!	Aki's Dad, Salaryman (voice)	Episode: "The Curse of Kaniaku"
2019–2021	Carmen Sandiego	Shadow-san (voice)	Main role
2019	Mickey Mouse Mixed-Up Adventures	Gyoji (voice)	Main role
2021	Big City Greens	Japanese Cashier (voice)	Episode: "The Van"
2021	Star Wars: Visions	Yasaburo, Master (voice)	Episode: "Lop & Ochō"; English dub
2021	Gen:Lock	Morisuke (voice)	4 episodes
2021	Squid Game	Jang Deok-su (voice)	English dub
2021	Hellbound	Gong Hyeongjun, Professor (voice)	Unknown episodes; English dub
2022	Cyberpunk: Edgerunners	Tanaka (voice)	English dub
2023	Record of Ragnarok	Kisaburo Onogawa, Genpaku Sugita, Isami Kondo (voice)	English dub
2024	Shōgun	Yoshii Toranaga (voice)	English dub

=== Video games ===
Year	Title	Role	Notes
2004	Syphon Filter: The Omega Strain	Yakuza, Matsua	
2005	The Matrix: Path of Neo	Red Pill Herb Shop Owner	
2006	Tomb Raider: Legend	Toru Nishimura	
2006	Destroy All Humans! 2	Additional Voices	
2007	Spider-Man 3	Additional Voices	
2007	Pirates of the Caribbean: At World's End	Captain Sao Feng	
2007	No More Heroes	Thunder Ryu	
2008	Call of Duty: World at War	Japanese Announcer	
2010	Lost Planet 2	Additional Voices	
2011	Dead or Alive: Dimensions	Gen Fu	English dub
2011	Cars 2	Shu Todoroki	
2012	World of Warcraft: Mists of Pandaria	Shao-Tien Executioner, Qiang the Merciless, Hu'seng the Gatekeeper, Lei Shen	
2013	Lost Planet 3	Soichi Katsuragi, Crewman Dumont, Crewman Ed	
2014	Diablo III: Reaper of Souls	Malthael	
2014	Game of Thrones	Bloodsong	
2015	Battlefield Hardline	Additional Voices	
2015	Heroes of the Storm	Malthael, Hanzo	
2016	Overwatch	Hanzo	
2017	Dishonored: Death of the Outsider	Shan Yun	
2018	World of Warcraft: Battle for Azeroth		
2022	Guild Wars 2: End of Dragons	Saint Viktor	
2022	Overwatch 2	Hanzo	
2023	Starfield	Oktai Enbayar	
2023	Teenage Mutant Ninja Turtles: Splintered Fate	Splinter / Hamato Yoshi	
2024	Like a Dragon: Infinite Wealth	Additional voices	
2024	Rise of the Rōnin	Yasusuke Sawamura	
2025	Yakuza 0 Director's Cut	Shintaro Kazama	
2026	Yakuza Kiwami 3 & Dark Ties	Shintaro Kazama	
2026	Teenage Mutant Ninja Turtles: Empire City	Splinter / Hamato Yoshi	
