= The I in Team =

- Buffy the Vampire Slayer episode
- Episode no.: Season 4 Episode 13
- Directed by: James A. Contner
- Written by: David Fury
- Production code: 4ABB13
- Original air date: February 8, 2000

Guest appearances
- Amber Benson as Tara Maclay; George Hertzberg as Adam; Leonard Roberts as Forrest Gates; Bailey Chase as Graham Miller; Jack Stehlin as Dr. Angleman; Emma Caulfield as Anya; Lindsay Crouse as Maggie Walsh; Neil Daly as Mason

Episode chronology
← Previous "A New Man"	Next → "Goodbye Iowa"
- Buffy the Vampire Slayer season 4

"The I in Team" is the 13th episode of season 4 of the television show Buffy the Vampire Slayer. The episode aired on The WB on February 8, 2000.

Professor Maggie Walsh tries to kill Buffy; Willow and Tara grow closer. The Scooby Gang help Spike when he is pursued by the Initiative.

== Plot ==
Willow, Anya, and Xander are playing three-handed poker since Buffy is elsewhere. They wonder about the intentions of the ultra-secretive Initiative. In a field test against the commandos, Buffy impresses Professor Walsh with her physical prowess and innate martial instincts. The next day in the university cafeteria, Buffy gushes about her performance to Willow. Willow urges an exclusive meeting with the Scooby Gang at the Bronze that night to reinvigorate their core camaraderie.

Giles visits Spike at his new crypt to pay the $300 he owes Spike for undoing a spell that turned him into a demon. Spike makes it clear that he will not help them again and wants nothing more to do with the Scoobies. Riley takes Buffy into the Initiative, where Walsh gives her a tour of the impressive facility and makes her a member of the team. However, a slip from Buffy indicating her prior knowledge of the Initiative's behavior modification research (viz. Spike's chip) does not go unnoticed. Tara tries to give a powerful magical crystal to Willow, a family heirloom, but Willow thinks it is too large a gift. She suggests that they do try some spells with the crystal, though, and Tara suggests that night. Willow reluctantly declines due to her plans with the Scoobies. Walsh enters Room 314 in the secure lab area to check up on her special project: a part-demon, part-human, part-robot creature named Adam.

Buffy is an hour late meeting her friends at the Bronze, and when she does show, she brings Riley and the team. Willow questions how much trust Buffy should put in the Initiative. When Buffy interrupts the special party to rush off on assignment with the team, Willow, feeling abandoned, goes to Tara's dorm room after all. Professor Walsh instructs Buffy and the commandos to deploy in two teams in search of a Polgara demon. They are to keep the demon's arms, which contain vicious retracting spears, intact.

Forrest spots Spike and sends his team after the vampire. Spike escapes, but they shoot him with a tracking device to be able to locate him later. The Polgara demon attacks the Alpha team; Buffy and Riley, fighting together, capture it for the Initiative. Stimulated, they have sex for the first time in Riley's dorm room as Walsh watches them from a secret camera. In the morning, when Buffy asks about "314", Riley immediately receives a call from Walsh with the assignment to follow the tracer and retrieve Spike for their containment facility again. Walsh and Dr. Angleman decide to go ahead with their plan to get rid of Buffy.

Desperate and unable to shake off the commandos, Spike goes to a reluctant Giles for help, begrudgingly returning most of the money. Giles tries to remove the embedded tracer from Spike's shoulder, but it is in too deep. Riley reinforces Forrest's team. With the soldiers gone, Walsh summons Buffy for an easy mission and arms her with a stun rifle. Wearing a heart monitor and sound camera, Buffy goes out alone. The mission is a trap. The rifle shorts out, the exit is barred, and Buffy is set upon by two powerful demons armed with axes.

With Willow doing a spell to mask Spike's whereabouts and to buy them time, and with Spike drinking cognac in lieu of anesthesia, Giles finally removes the tracer from the vampire's shoulder. They flush it down the toilet just in time to misdirect Riley and his team. Buffy kills the demons, but in the fight the monitor falls off. With no reported heartbeat or movement Walsh assumes that she is dead and tells Riley this. In the middle of her "eulogy", Buffy picks up the camera and reveals, in full view of Riley, Walsh's trap, causing him to walk out on Walsh.

Back at Giles' apartment, Giles strongly urges Spike to leave Sunnydale for his own safety, reasoning that it is not safe for him to remain there while the Initiative is still active; Buffy arrives and tells everyone that it is not safe for any of them.

The Initiative has grafted an arm from the Polgara demon to Adam. Walsh, upset that she had to sacrifice Buffy and Riley's loyalty to safeguard her great project Adam, goes to Room 314 and speaks to the sleeping creature. Adam awakes and skewers Walsh with his new arm spear, killing her.

== Critical response ==
Vox, ranking it at #129 of all 144 episodes on their "Worst to Best" list, writes, "Season four contains some of the best standalone episodes of Buffy's run, but it has easily the weakest overall arc. And 'The I in Team' is an arc-heavy episode: It's the one where Buffy joins the Initiative but then Professor Walsh decides to kill her for vague, Oedipal complex–related reasons. As Whedon admits in his season four DVD interviews, the issue with the Initiative and Adam as Big Bads is that no one in the main cast has an emotional connection to them except for Riley. And as Whedon has not directly said, but most fans can agree, Riley is not a compelling enough character to drive a whole season's worth of plot on his own."
