= Lauren Holly =

American and Canadian actress (born 1963)

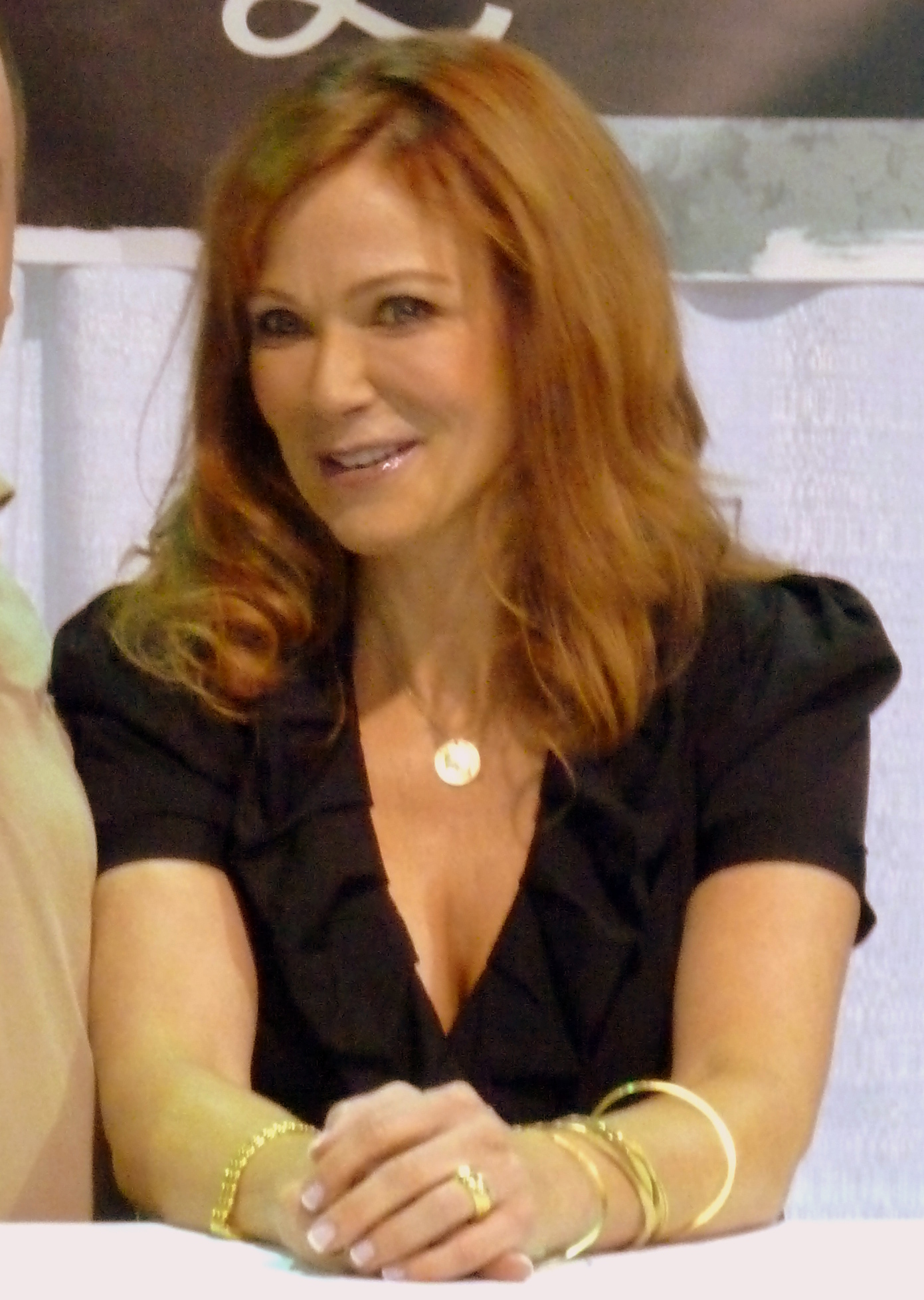
- Holly in 2012
- Born: Lauren Michael Holly; October 28, 1963 (age 62); Bristol, Pennsylvania, U.S.
- Citizenship: United States; Canada (from 2009)
- Education: Sarah Lawrence College
- Occupation: Actress
- Years active: 1984–present
- Spouses: Danny Quinn (m. 1991; div. 1993); Jim Carrey (m. 1996; div. 1997); Francis Greco (m. 2001; div. 2014)
- Children: 3
- Mother: Michael Ann Holly
- Website: laurenholly.com

Lauren Michael Holly (born October 28, 1963) is an American and Canadian actress. She has played the roles of Deputy Sheriff Maxine Stewart in the television series Picket Fences, NCIS Director Jenny Shepard in the series NCIS, and Dr. Betty Rogers on Motive. In film, she portrayed Mary Swanson in Dumb and Dumber (1994), Bruce Lee's wife Linda Lee in Dragon: The Bruce Lee Story (1993), Darian Smalls in Beautiful Girls (1996), and Gigi in What Women Want (2000).

== Early life ==
Holly was born in Bristol, Pennsylvania. Her mother, Michael Ann Holly, is an art historian. She was the Starr Director of Research and Academic Program at the Sterling and Francine Clark Art Institute, and a professor at Hobart and William Smith Colleges. Her father, Grant Holly, was a screenwriter and professor of literature at Hobart and William Smith Colleges. She had two younger brothers: Nick Holly and Alexander Innes Holly. Holly attended Sarah Lawrence College in New York.

== Career ==
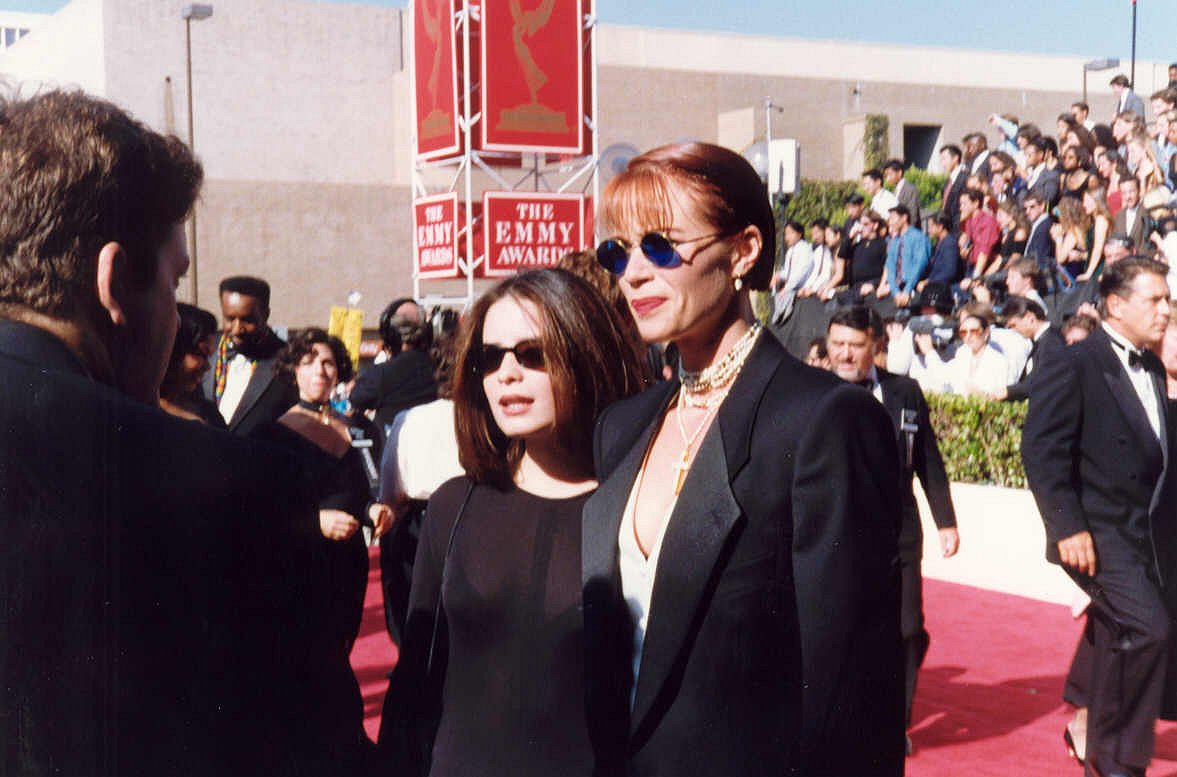
Holly with Holly Marie Combs (left) at the 1993 Emmy Awards

Holly's acting career began at the age of 20 when she appeared as Carla Walicki in two episodes of Hill Street Blues. She was also in one episode of Spenser: For Hire. At age 23, she joined the cast of the ABC television soap opera All My Children as Julie Rand Chandler (1986–1989). She portrayed the comic book character Betty Cooper in the TV movie Archie: To Riverdale and Back Again in 1990.

In 1992, Holly's big break came when she was cast as small-town Deputy Sheriff Maxine Stewart opposite veteran movie actor Tom Skerritt on CBS's Picket Fences for four seasons, appearing in every episode except one. She portrayed Linda Lee Cadwell, the wife of martial artist and actor Bruce Lee, in 1993's Dragon: The Bruce Lee Story. She appeared as Mary Swanson, Lloyd Christmas's love interest, in the 1994 Jim Carrey comedy Dumb and Dumber; a doctor in Sydney Pollack's 1995 remake of Sabrina; and Lieutenant Emily Lake in the 1996 comedy Down Periscope with Kelsey Grammer. In 1999, she starred in the film Any Given Sunday as the wife of the Sharks quarterback, played by Dennis Quaid.

Holly appeared in the music video for Dixie Chicks' single "Goodbye Earl" (2000). She was a member of the cast of NCIS as Director Jenny Shepard from 2005 to 2008, reuniting with her former Chicago Hope co-stars Mark Harmon and Rocky Carroll. Holly portrayed the "worldly and stunning" lead medical examiner Dr. Betty Rogers, a regular character on the CTV series Motive. In 2014, she was reunited with her Picket Fences co-star, Tom Skerritt, in the film Field of Lost Shoes. In 2015, Holly starred in Oz Perkins' horror film The Blackcoat's Daughter.

In 2018, Holly was cast in a recurring role in the third season of Netflix's Designated Survivor as Lynn Harper.

== Personal life ==
Holly has been married three times. Her first marriage was to actor Danny Quinn. The two married in 1991, and divorced two years later in 1993. In 1993, she met Jim Carrey during auditions for Ace Ventura: Pet Detective. She did not get offered the part, but the two developed a relationship while working together during the filming of Dumb and Dumber. In 1996 they were married. The marriage lasted less than a year, and they divorced in 1997. In 2001, she married Francis Greco, a Canadian-born investment banker. The couple adopted three children, sons Henry, George, and Alexander Holly-Greco. In 2008, while married to Greco, Holly became a Canadian citizen. The couple divorced in 2014.

In 1992, Holly, her father Grant, and their families established the "A" Fund at Hobart and William Smith Colleges in memory of her brother, Alexander, about whom Holly said, "He was a boy filled with dreams, hopes, and plans. Although he was only 14 when he died, he had traveled extensively in Europe and Central America, lived in New York City and Los Angeles, and these experiences produced in him a fascination for architecture and archaeology."

== Filmography ==
=== Film ===
Year	Title	Role	Notes
1985	Seven Minutes in Heaven	Lisa	
1986	Band of the Hand	Nikki	
1990	The Adventures of Ford Fairlane	Jazz	
1992	Live Wire	Suzie Bryant	
1993	Dragon: The Bruce Lee Story	Linda Lee	
1994	Dumb and Dumber	Mary Swanson	MTV Movie Award for Best Kiss (with Jim Carrey)
1995	Sabrina	Elizabeth Tyson	
1996	Beautiful Girls	Darian Smalls	
1996	Down Periscope	Lt. Emily Lake	
1997	Turbulence	Teri Halloran	
1997	A Smile Like Yours	Jennifer Robertson	
1998	No Looking Back	Claudia	
1999	Entropy	Claire	
1999	Any Given Sunday	Cindy Rooney	
2000	The Last Producer	Frances Chadway	
2000	What Women Want	Gigi	
2002	Pavement	Detective Buckley Clark	
2002	Spirited Away	Yūko Ogino	Voice role (English dub)
2004	In Enemy Hands	Mrs. Rachel Travers	
2005	The Chumscrubber	Boutique Owner	
2005	Down and Derby	Kim Davis	
2005	The Godfather of Green Bay	Molly Mahoney	
2006	Fatwa	Maggie Davidson	
2006	The Pleasure Drivers	Daphne Widesecker	
2006	Raising Flagg	Rachel Purdy	
2009	The Least Among You	Kate Allison	
2009	Crank: High Voltage	Psychiatrist	Uncredited
2009	The Perfect Age of Rock 'n' Roll	Liza Genson	
2010	You're So Cupid!	Audrey Valentine	
2010	The Final Storm	Gillian Grady	
2010	Chasing 3000	Marilyn	
2013	Abducted	Suzanne Hollingsworth	
2013	Field of Lost Shoes	Mrs. Clinedinst	
2014	The Town That Came A-Courtin	Abby Houston	
2015	Marshall the Miracle Dog	Susan	
2015	Hoovey	Ruth	
2015	After the Ball	Elise Adams Kassell	
2015	The Blackcoat's Daughter	Linda	
2017	Dead Shack	Neighbor	
2018	My Perfect Romance	Adele	
2018	Ultra Low	Herself	
2019	Tammy's Always Dying	Ilana Wiseman	
2019	The Cuban	Nurse Baker	
2024	Hot Frosty	Jane Miller	
2025	Loathe Thy Neighbor	Wanda Bellarose	
2026	Broad Trip	Jeanie	

=== Television ===
Year	Title	Role	Notes
1984	Hill Street Blues	Carla Walicki	2 episodes
1985	Love Lives On	Tracy	Television film
1986	Spenser: For Hire	Emily Brown	Episode: "Home Is the Hero"
1986–1989	All My Children	Julie Chandler	Unknown episodes Nomination: Daytime Emmy Award for Outstanding Younger Actress in a Drama Series (1988)
1990	Archie: To Riverdale and Back Again	Betty Cooper	Television film
1990	My Two Dads	Allison Novack	2 episodes
1991	The Antagonists	Kate Ward	Episode: "Con Safos"
1992	Fugitive Among Us	Suzie Bryant	Television film
1992–1996	Picket Fences	Maxine Stewart	Main role; 88 episodes; Won – Viewers for Quality Television Award for Best Supporting Actress in a Quality Drama Series (1994); Nominated – Screen Actors Guild Award for Outstanding Performance by an Ensemble in a Drama Series (1995–1996)
1994	Dangerous Heart	Carol	Television film
1998	Vig	Marybeth	Television film
1999	Fantasy Island	Heather Finn	Episode: "The Real Thing"
1999–2000	Chicago Hope	Dr. Jeremy Hanlon	Main role; 23 episodes
2001	Destiny	Cast Member	Television film
2001	Jackie, Ethel, Joan: The Women of Camelot	Ethel Kennedy	Television film Nominated for Satellite Award for Best Supporting Actress – Series, Miniseries or Television Film
2001	Becker	Laura	Episode: "The Buddy System"
2002	Providence	Darla Rosario	Episode: "The Heart of the Matter"
2002	King of Texas	Mrs. Rebecca Lear Highsmith	Television film
2002	Living with the Dead	James' Wife	Television film
2002	Santa Jr.	Susan Flynn	Television film
2003	CSI: Miami	Hayley Wilson	Episode: "Grand Prix"
2004	Just Desserts	Grace Carpenter	Television film
2004	Caught in the Act	Jodie Colter	Television film
2005	Bounty Hunters	Tess	Television film
2005–2008	NCIS	NCIS Director Jenny Shepard	Main role; 67 episodes
2009	Leverage	Ms. Tobey Earnshaw	Episode: "The Juror #6 Job"
2009	Before You Say I Do	Mary Brown	Television film
2009	Too Late to Say Goodbye	Heather	Television film
2010	Covert Affairs	Madeline Jarvis	Episode: "Houses of the Holy"
2010	Flashpoint	Jill Hastings	Episode: "Acceptable Risk"
2010	The Town Christmas Forgot	Annie Benson	Television film
2010	Mrs. Miracle 2: Miracle In Manhattan	Lindy Lowe	Television film
2010–2012	The Adventures of Chuck and Friends	Haulie	Recurring voice role; 39 episodes
2011	Rookie Blue	Superintendent Elaine Peck	Episode: "In Plain View"
2011	Scream of the Banshee	Prof. Isla Whelan	Television film
2012	Lost Girl	Sadie	Episode: "Midnight Lamp"
2012	Alphas	Senator Charlotte Burton	3 episodes
2012	Layover	Suzanne Hollingsworth	Television film
2012	Do No Harm	Dr. Thorne	Television film
2013–2016	Motive	Dr. Betty Rogers	52 episodes
2015	A Country Wedding	Margaret	Television film
2016	My Summer Prince	Deidre Kelly	Television film
2017	Lucifer	Roxie Pagliani	Episode: "Vegas with Some Radish"
2018	Good Witch	Melanie Anderson	Episode: "How to Make a Middleton Quilt"
2018	My Perfect Romance	Adele	Television film
2018	Christmas Catch	Captain Bennett	Television film
2019	Designated Survivor	Lynn Harper	9 episodes
2020	Tiny Pretty Things	Monique Dubois	10 episodes
2021–2026	Family Law	Joanne Kowalski	40 episodes
2022	The Lake	Mimsy	8 episodes
2022	Country Roads Christmas	Skye's mother	Television film
2023	The Irrational	Mayor	Episode: "Pilot"
2024	Christmas Under the Northern Lights	Laura	Television film
