= Country Roads Christmas =

American-Canadian film

- Directed by: Marco Deufemia
- Written by: Luciano Casimiri
- Starring: Bailey Chase; Lanie McAuley; Lauren Holly
- Narrated by: Bailey Chase
- Release date: 2022
- Country: United States
- Language: English

Country Roads Christmas is an American holiday film, released in 2022. It was added to Fox Nation on November 27, 2022.

== Plot ==
Country Roads Christmas is set in Nashville during the holidays. It opens with the famous singer, Harris Anderson (played by Bailey Chase), narrating the film and explaining the Christmas changed his life. For the past couple of decades, he has chosen a lifestyle of fame, often neglecting his family as a result. Harris supposedly left her mother for another singer, which estranged him from his daughter for many years.

Ryan, the managing executive of Harris' label, takes on the responsibility of bringing the family back together. He offers Harris' now adult daughter a job at the label as road manager for her own father. During life on the road, Harris and Skye reconnect and she begins to warm to him. They spend their first Christmas together in years, with Harris admitting some unknown truths to Skye.

== Cast ==
- Lanie McAuley as Skye
- Bo Yokely as Ryan
- Bailey Chase as Harris
- Lanette Ware as Shelby
- Anita Yung as Tiffany
- Lauren Holly as Skye's mother
- Nola Martin as Kelly

== Release ==
Following its initial release on INSP, Country Roads Christmas was made available for streaming on Fox Nation from Number 27, 2022. It was then released on Blu-ray and DVD prior to Christmas 2022. It was also made available in the UK on Channel 5 for streaming.

== Reception ==
The Dove Foundation gave the film a positive review and stated it was suitable for all ages. Its review read, "For a path to 'finding the way home,' as Harris Anderson does after years of misunderstandings and hurt, Country Roads Christmas will surely get you there."
