= Michael Ann Holly =

American art historian

- Born: Michael Ann Mueller; July 19, 1944 (age 82); Alton, Illinois, U.S.
- Education: William Smith College; Cornell University
- Occupation: Art historian
- Children: 3, including Lauren Holly

Michael Ann Holly (née Mueller; July 19, 1944) is an American art historian who has worked on historiography and the theory of art history.

== Personal life ==
Born in 1944 in Alton, Illinois, the daughter of Peggy and George Mueller, Holly worked at the Wesleyan University Press from 1963 to 1966 and the Visual and Cultural Studies at the University of Rochester before beginning her academic career.

Her daughter is the actress Lauren Holly, and sons Nick and Alexander Innes Holly (1977–92).

== Education ==
Holly earned a B.A. summa cum laude from William Smith College in 1973. She completed her doctorate in art history from Cornell University in 1981 with a dissertation on Erwin Panofsky's theories of art.

== Career ==
Michael Ann Holly taught history and art history at Hobart and Williams Smith Colleges from 1978 to 1984, then joined the faculty of the University of Rochester, where she co-founded the Visual and Cultural Studies Graduate Program in 1986, and taught for 13 years. Holly served as the Starr Director of the Research and Academic Program at the Sterling and Francine Clark Art Institute in Williamstown, Massachusetts before retiring in 2016, and currently serves as the Starr Director Emerita. She now teaches critical theory, methodology, and historiography in the Williams Graduate Program in the History of Art. She is a past Fellow of the National Endowment for the Humanities and Guggenheim Foundation, Getty Foundation, and has received grants from the American Council of Learned Societies, National Endowment of the Humanities, Rockefeller Foundation, and the Mellon Foundation. Holly served as a trustee of the National Humanities Center in Research Triangle Park, North Carolina, and currently serves as trustee emerita.

== Bibliography ==
- Panofsky and the Foundations of Art History. (Cornell University Press, 1984).
- (Editor, with Norman Bryson and Keith Moxey) Visual Theory: Painting and Interpretation. (Harper Collins, 1991).
- (Editor, with Norman Bryson and Keith Moxey) Visual Culture: Images and Interpretation (University Press of New England for Wesleyan University Press, 1994).
- Past Looking: Historical Imagination and the Rhetoric of Images (Cornell University Press, 1996).
- (Editor, with others) The Subjects of Art History: Historical Objects in Contemporary Perspectives (Cambridge University Press, 1998).
- (Editor, with Keith Moxey) Art History, Aesthetics, Visual Studies. Clark Studies in the Visual Arts. (Sterling and Francine Clark Art Institute, 2002).
- (Editor, with Marquard Smith) What Is Research in the Visual Arts? Obsession, Archive, Encounter. Clark Studies in the Visual Arts. (Sterling and Francine Clark Art Institute, 2008).
- The Melancholy Art. (Princeton University Press, 2013).
