= Dark Metropolis =

- Directed by: Stewart St. John
- Written by: Stewart St. John
- Produced by: Todd Fisher; Cathy Fry; Stewart St. John
- Cinematography: Seamus Tierney
- Music by: Ludek Drizhal
- Production companies: Stewdiomedia Entertainment; St. John/Fisher Productions
- Distributed by: Indican Pictures
- Release date: December 14, 2010
- Running time: 97 minutes
- Country: United States
- Language: English

Dark Metropolis is a 2010 science fiction film with political and spiritual overtones, written and directed by Stewart St. John. It is the second part of the Creation Wars saga, following The Next Race: The Remote Viewings. Two more sequels are planned.

== Plot ==
Mankind has lost a 300-year war against a genetically enhanced race that man created, abused and finally tortured. Now the descendants of that race - known as the 'Ghen' control the planet Earth from advanced underground cities.

== Cast ==
- Bailey Chase as Aiden Pryme
- Pamela Clay as Hannalin Pryme
- Kristy Hulslander as the Channeler
- Matt O'Toole as Brother Wikstrom
- Arthur Roberts as Potentate XXXIV
- Eric Scott Woods as Crecilius Pryme
- Mercedes LeAnza as Young Hanalin Pryme

== See also ==
- List of dystopian films
