= Adam (Buffy the Vampire Slayer) =

Fictional character in the television series Buffy the Vampire Slayer

- Buffy the Vampire Slayer character
- George Hertzberg portrayed Adam
- First appearance: "The I in Team" (2000)
- Last appearance: "Lessons" (2002)
- Created by: Joss Whedon
- Portrayed by: George Hertzberg

In-universe information
- Affiliation: Initiative
- Classification: "Bio-mechanical demonoid"
- Notable powers: Superhuman strength, stamina, and durability. Skewer, collapsible minigun and grenade launcher housed within arms. Cybernetic abilities.

Adam is a fictional character in the fourth season of the television series Buffy the Vampire Slayer, serving as that season's primary antagonists (or "Big Bad"). Introduced in the episode "The I in Team," Adam is a cybernetic demonoid created from human, demon, and technological components by Dr. Maggie Walsh (Lindsay Crouse), head of The Initiative—a military organization studying demon behavior. After gaining consciousness, Adam kills Walsh and escapes containment. He then sets in motion plans to stage a demon and human massacre; Adam hopes that, in the aftermath of the battle, he will be able use the carnage to create an army of undead demonoids like himself. The character is ultimately defeated by Buffy (Sarah Michelle Gellar), a Slayer with superhuman strength, and her friends in the season's penultimate episode "Primeval".

Adam was played by George Hertzberg, who series creator Joss Whedon tasked with finding the character's "stillness". In terms of thematic resonance and characterization, the character draws heavily from Mary Shelley's Frankenstein, and the show uses the character to question the morality of scientific advancement, highlighting the tension between technology and humanity. As a monster that begins life by killing his creator, Adam also serves as a way for the show to question tradition and authority, specifically institutional authority. Critical reception to Adam has been largely mixed. Some commentators felt his subplot was confusing and unconvincing, whereas others enjoyed the concept and praised the make-up and special effects used to create the character.

== Character arc ==
=== Television appearances ===
Adam makes his first appearance on the thirteenth episode of season 4, "The I in Team". The first twelve episodes of the season establish the overarching themes, with increasing focus on the mysterious activities of the Initiative. Buffy and Willow begin attending college, an experience which overwhelms Buffy immediately as she finds herself far outside her comfort zone. In the season premiere, Buffy and Willow begin attending a challenging psychology class taught by Dr. Maggie Walsh (Lindsay Crouse). She also meets Dr. Walsh's teaching assistant Riley Finn (Marc Blucas) and they become attracted to each other. Riley is in charge of a military commando organization that hunts vampires and demons, and captures them for research. It is not revealed to audiences that Dr. Walsh is the head of the research branch of Riley's military organization, called the Initiative, until the seventh episode.

The Initiative's goals are gradually made clearer. A recurring character since the second season is Spike (James Marsters), a mercenary vampire who has fought both against and with Buffy in the past, depending on what suits his interests. Recently wanting to kill Buffy, Spike is captured by the Initiative before he can get to her and implanted with a chip in his brain that causes intense pain if he tries to attack humans to feed on them, or even to fight them. Buffy begins enthusiastically training with the Initiative, spending more time with Riley, and trying to impress Dr. Walsh. At different times, Willow, Xander, and Giles caution Buffy that she does not know the Initiative's true motives and there are questions about their mission that are unanswered. Buffy begins asking questions during "The I in Team". After being sent after a Polgara demon, a being with a skewer in its arm, she wants to know why the demon must be captured alive and unharmed as she is used to killing demons. Her questions at first confound Dr. Walsh—who answers to no one—then cement Dr. Walsh's decision to remove Buffy from the Initiative. After a botched attempt to kill Buffy, Dr. Walsh consoles herself by going into laboratory room 314, where she speaks to her pet project: Adam, who is laying on a table, apparently unconscious. Adam rises and impales Dr. Walsh with the skewer in his arm—the one taken off the Polgara demon. His first word is "Mommy", which he says as Dr. Walsh falls to the floor, dead.

Riley, meanwhile, learns of Dr. Walsh's death and his comrades Forrest (Leonard Roberts) and Graham (Bailey Chase) suspect Buffy to be her murderer. Extremely agitated and showing signs of drug withdrawal, he follows Buffy and demands to know the truth in "Goodbye Iowa". None of them are aware of Adam until he re-emerges in the underground laboratories of the Initiative, killing Dr. Walsh's assistant and another soldier. He tells Riley that he knows Dr. Walsh created them both, that she gave Riley chemicals to strengthen him, which makes them brothers. When Riley refuses to acknowledge their bond, Adam skewers Riley, and knocks Buffy across the room while Forrest and Graham are trying to enter the locked door. Adam leaves and the Initiative are tasked with hunting him down and killing him. When one of Sunnydale's residents, Jonathan Levinson (Danny Strong), casts a spell making him the center of everyone's attention in "Superstar", Adam is the only character in town who realizes it is an illusion. He explains his insight by saying he is "aware". His uniqueness has set him apart. Adam is interested in how the illusion will play out, however, and watches it unfold. During the illusion, Jonathan—temporarily a part of the Inititative—discovers Adam's only weakness: a uranium power core source which, effectively, will never allow him to die.

Spike simultaneously discovers Adam to be communicating with the town's demon underworld, asking for favors through a charisma he has over them. Adam promises if Spike can drive apart Buffy and Riley and their friends, he will remove Spike's microchip. The plan to drive Buffy, Willow, Xander, and Giles apart works for a while; at their lowest, the four refuse to speak to each other, but each of them realizes in "Primeval" that they were manipulated by Spike and return, apologetic. They realize that Adam has been orchestrating the capture of the town's vampires and demons so he can release them in the Initiative; the Initiative's holding cells are becoming overcrowded and the soldiers spread very thin and overworked. The soldiers and demons will then proceed to kill each other. Adam intends to use the resulting carnage to create an army of monsters much like himself.

Buffy, Willow, Xander, and Giles realize they must work as one unit to defeat Adam. They are captured sneaking into the Initiative, but Adam trips the power, releasing all the demons and a fight breaks out all over the facility. Buffy, Willow, Xander, and Giles get themselves into a room adjacent to 314 as Willow starts to cast the spell to join them all temporarily. Riley distracts Adam's demonoid minions while Buffy confronts Adam. However, Adam, after modulating his arm to dispense a minigun, is able to overpower her. Suddenly, the spell begins to work: to function as one unit, Willow becomes the spirit, Giles the mind, Xander the heart, and Buffy the hand, or strength, of their ensemble. They work through Buffy to neutralize Adam, telling him "You could never hope to grasp the source of our power". Adam, alone but intrigued, shoots at them to no avail. Adam then shoots a missile, which is changed into doves, and his gun is reverted into his arm. They are able, through Buffy, to punch inside Adam's chest, remove his uranium core, destroying him.

Adam's most significant influence following his death is in the next episode "Restless", where the cost of defeating Adam is made apparent. Buffy's fourth season was a first in the series in that the Scoobies' defeat of the Big Bad did not occur in a two-part grand season finale. "Primeval" is not the last episode of the season. Joss Whedon felt so strongly about the importance of the four core characters that he dedicated the finale to exploring their development. "Restless" opens with Buffy, Willow, Xander, and Giles arriving at Buffy's mother's house still brimming with the energy of the spell that bound them together in "Primeval". Each of them falls asleep quickly, however, and their dreams are a pastiche of enigmatic episodes that both reveal much about each character, but also foreshadow what will occur in seasons to come. Their dreams also mirror their roles in the spell they performed to kill Adam. The magic they used to defeat the influence of science creates an inverse crisis, violating the series' set of laws. Both Riley and Adam, now only in human form, appear in Buffy's dream. They are wearing business suits, sitting together at a glass conference table as Buffy walks into the room, telling her they are naming things—as Adam did in the Garden of Eden—and making plans to take over the world. Buffy asks Adam what his name was before he was a monster, but he cannot tell her. Adam appears once more in the series as one of the faces of the First Evil, the seventh season's Big Bad, in "Lessons".

=== Graphic novel appearance ===
According to the comic book series Haunted, Adam was once a human member of the Initiative tasked with protecting Professor Walsh. The ghost of Mayor Richard Wilkins, however, took over the body of a vampire, which was then captured by the Initiative. Desperate to escape, the Mayor moved to the body of a dead demon and killed Adam. Having been one of her favorite agents, Professor Walsh vowed to bring him back to life and placed his body in her 314 Project. However, due to the complex nature of the Buffyverse, this chain of events may not, in fact, be canonical.

== Development ==
=== Creation and casting ===
I think there is a boyish innocence to Adam, that coupled with his programming—which is basically to kill—makes him an evil demon being-man-machine-person. Is he evil or misunderstood? I don't think he's misunderstood. Can he be reprogrammed? I think it's possible, but if he was, I don't know how interesting that would be.

— George Hertzberg, outlining his character.

Series writer David Fury cited graphic novel author Alan Moore's Promethea—a story combining science fiction, mysticism, and a female superhero—as inspiration for the storyline, and another nod to Frankenstein as its original title was Frankenstein; or, the Modern Prometheus. In addition, series creator, Joss Whedon has long been interested in science fiction. He wrote the script for the film Alien Resurrection (1997), where an extraterrestrial creature is bred from a human and an alien in a laboratory, and went on to develop the space Western television series Firefly. Buffy uses both science and magic as narrative devices. According to author Andrew Aberdein, the series employs science in three ways: to demonstrate what contemporary science explains, to posit what science may be able to accomplish, and the dominance of supernatural forces over science. According to Aberdein, Adam, a "kinematically redundant, bio-mechanical demonoid", is the series' deepest exploration of scientific potential. Series writer Doug Petrie states that Adam is the embodiment of the invasion of science in a world where magic is the most powerful force. The series relied on its own form of magic to explain Buffy's superpowers and other supernatural occurrences up to the fourth season. Adam is "what happens when people who believe in science use demons for military gain", according to Petrie. The result is that science "gets its ass kicked" by magic.

Buffy the Vampire Slayer had been very successful in its first three seasons on television, but some of the characters left the series and storylines ended, creating a need for an entire shift in location and mission. Buffy and the core group of friends who fight with her graduate from high school, while the school itself was blown up in the third-season finale. The fourth season, therefore, presents viewers with Buffy, her best friends Willow (Alyson Hannigan), Xander (Nicholas Brendon), and mentor Giles (Anthony Head) at a crossroads. Series creator Joss Whedon called it a "strange, sort of schizophrenic season" with a "weird incoherence", but also stated that the episodes in the fourth season were among the series' best. The writers set out to explore the characters' trials as they discover more about themselves following the defining years of high school. Although they had been a cohesive group of friends in the first three seasons, situations arise in the fourth to separate them. The writers focused on each of the four core characters individually throughout the season to increase the impact of their finally coming back together in the penultimate episode, "Primeval", when they merge their essences to form a super-Buffy in order to defeat Adam.

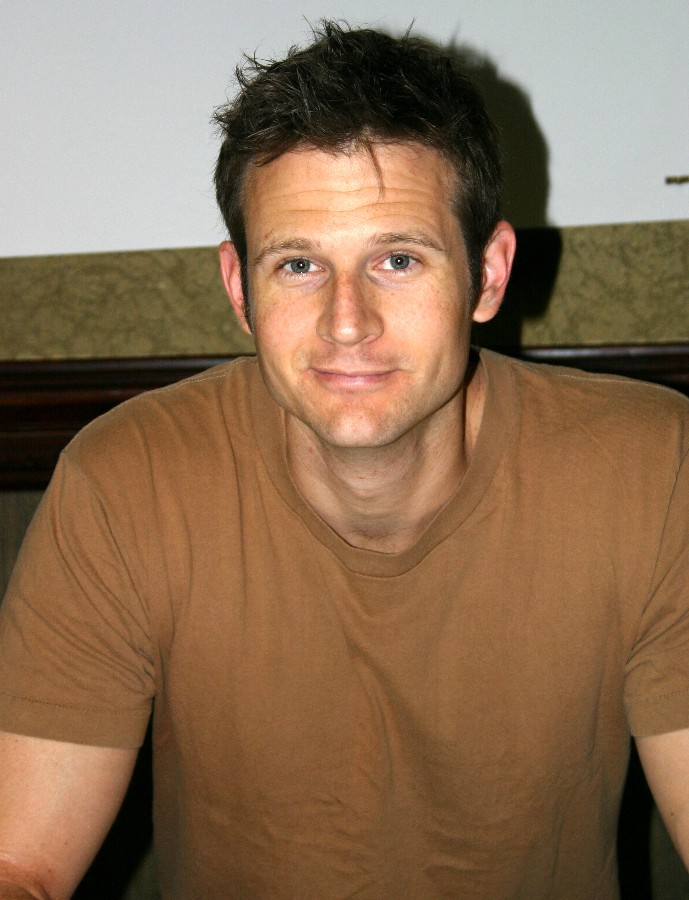
Actor George Hertzberg portrayed Adam in the series.

George Hertzberg, a University of Southern California graduate with experience in sitcoms and commercials, was chosen based on one of Adam's monologues he was given to read for the audition. Hertzberg counted luck and being in the right place at the right time in helping him get the role. Many recurring characters on Buffy start with one or two episodes, and when the writers or producers like their chemistry with other actors, they often make them a regular part of the cast. Hertzberg, however, understood at his reading that Adam was to be a major part of the fourth season. Casting Director Amy Britt needed someone physically imposing for the part, with the 6-foot-4-inch (1.93 m) Hertzberg fitting the bill. Britt stated, "this is a guy we're going to want eventually to have some affinity for. We can't just see him as an evil being. He is evil to the core [and] should scare us with his actions; but there's also innocence. Like the Frankenstein monster, you realize that they're only doing what they know. Or what they've been programmed to do. These aren't born creatures, these are creations."

=== Make-up ===
When he auditioned, Hertzberg had no idea what Adam would look like in full costume and make-up. Buffy used a company named Optic Nerve to build the materials to make Hertzberg look like a demonoid. Almost immediately after Hertzberg got the part, Optic Nerve sketched and sculpted Adam's appearance. They had Hertzberg come in to have molds made for prosthetic parts to fit his head and face, arms, chest, and legs, then he was fitted for contact lenses. They also created separate hands and a chest to film for close-up shots. Adam has a floppy disk drive mounted on his chest which, when used, had to be filmed without Hertzberg behind it. The entire construction of Adam's appearance took about two weeks. Hertzberg's voice was also modified post-production. When he saw the full Adam prosthetic and costume, his biggest concern was being able to show nuanced facial expressions under so much latex. It took hours to get Hertzberg into his full costume, but even after it was fully applied on set, often he would have to wait even longer before he went in front of the cameras. He spoke of the need to stay focused during all the waiting while sweating underneath everything he wore for the part.

== Themes ==
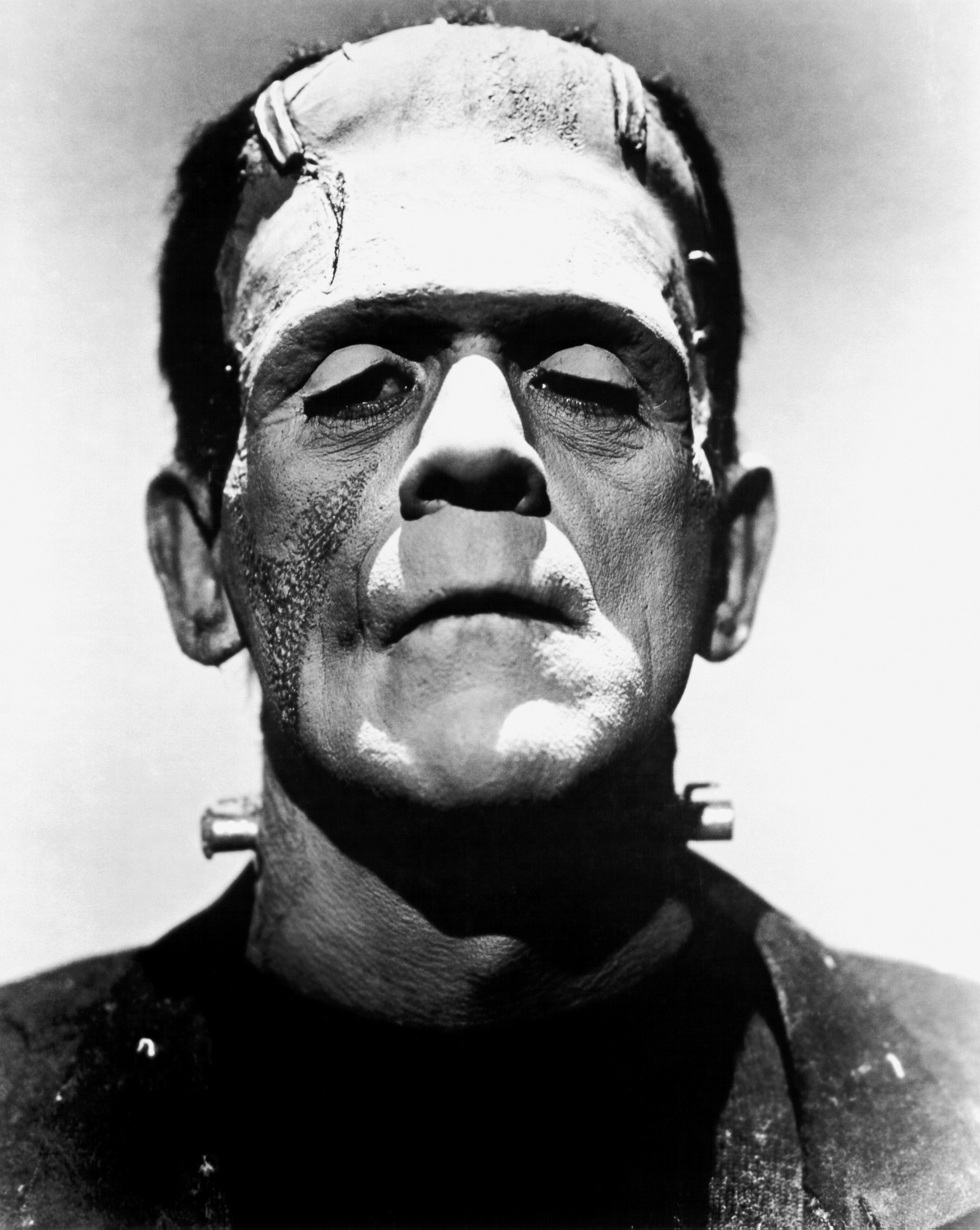
Adam serves as an allusion to Frankenstein's monster.

Buffy studies scholar Roz Kaveney states that estrangement from the self and others is the primary theme of the fourth season. To illustrate the absolute search for identity, the series writers created Adam, who is more truly alone than is anyone else. He is a creature assembled from a man, vampires, demons, and cutting edge cybernetic technology. Adam was not the first re-animated corpse to be presented in the series. "Some Assembly Required" in the second season also had a Frankenstein monster-like creation and "Beauty and the Beasts" in the third includes references to Strange Case of Dr Jekyll and Mr Hyde; both touch on the misuse or abuse of science. Adam is a clear reference to Frankenstein's monster, who in the novel Frankenstein (1818) tells his creator that he is the "Adam of your labours". Mary Shelley wrote the novel to highlight the problems progress, science, and industry create for humanity. Throughout the action, the monster constantly asks what he is and why he was created. Likewise, Adam escapes from 314 and makes his way out into the world, and much like Frankenstein's monster, he finds a little boy and asks the boy who and what he (Adam) is, then murders and dissects him. Adam is a curious character, seeking the truth and pontificating on what he has learned, even if he gained the knowledge through heartless violence. Whedon wanted Adam to be inquisitive and introspective, directing George Hertzberg to "find the stillness" in the character. Roz Kaveney notes that Hertzberg's "flawed but impressive performance" includes Adam's interesting idiosyncrasy of pausing each time he speaks, as if he is creating meaning with his own words and must consider the implications of what he is saying. Author Nikki Stafford connects Adam's need to learn about the world around him to Frankenstein's monster: Adam must understand why other people are here and why he has emotions, a peculiarity of his creation as Dr. Walsh never encouraged others to question her. One Buffy studies writer draws comparisons between Dr. Walsh and Victor Frankenstein, both of whom build monsters out of body parts "to compensate for human vulnerability". The moral of Shelley's novel is that what science can accomplish is not necessarily what it should.

Questioning tradition and authority, specifically institutional authority, is a repeated theme on the show. Buffy was created to subvert the media trope of a young, petite girl who easily falls prey to a male monster. Resisting patriarchy is exhibited in Buffy's opposing the first season's Master (Mark Metcalf), the leader of a cult determined to cause the apocalypse, and again in the third season where exploring the issues of power and its abuse is a primary theme. Buffy opposes Sunnydale's secretly evil Mayor (Harry Groener), who is planning to transform into a giant demon and feed on the graduating class of Sunnydale High School. The military-industrial complex is at the heart of the authority question in the show's fourth season, again drawing comparisons to Frankenstein. Where Frankenstein's monster had no parental love, Adam has a "design flaw". Unlike Frankenstein's monster, who needs his creator to make him a mate, Adam supplants Dr. Walsh's existence with technology, finding her unnecessary. Adam is the embodiment of the lack of moral guidance in pursuing scientific and technological advancement. He represents the cannibalistic nature of relentless and unchecked power, which always comes back to devour its source. Buffy, however, subverts Shelley's novel in the way Adam is defeated. Both Frankenstein and the monster must suffer alone. Frankenstein itself is an inversion of the Romantic era ideal of a solitary hero who must endure struggles, by portraying the monster and its creator as isolated and miserable. Buffy, as the embodiment of the postfeminist Romantic hero, further subverts this because the source of her success, according to Anita Rose, is that she fights with friends. Only then is she able to defeat Adam.

== Reception ==
Critical reception to Adam was largely mixed, with critics' opinions ranging from negative to positive. Nikki Stafford, in her book Bite Me!: The 10th Buffyversary Guide to the World of Buffy the Vampire Slayer, was critical of Adam as well as the series doing several Frankenstein-inspired episodes so close together, noting that "Some Assembly Required" was aired "just two seasons" prior. Stafford called the entire ending sequence of "Primeval", which featured the reanimated corpses of several minor characters as well as the death of Adam, "stupid and disgusting" and wrote that the scene was a main reason she was "happily bidding adieu" to the plot involving Adam and the Initiative. Jenna Busch, in her book Joss Whedon: The Complete Companion, called Adam "one of Buffy's least interesting Big Bads" and argued that his story-arc involving the Initiative was "rather unconvincing and somewhat off-putting".

Other reviews were more accepting of the character. Noel Murray from The A.V. Club was slightly more positive towards the concept of Adam. He wrote that he "love[d] the idea of Adam" but was having a hard time understanding the coherence of his application to the main plot. He cited inconsistencies in Adam's existence, noting, "Adam killed Professor Walsh weeks ago, and yet The Initiative is still fully operational, and no one seems overly bothered by the fact that one of their leaders was building a monster." Murray, however, did conclude that the show's writers and producers "did a decent job of bringing [the plot involving Adam] to a conclusion". Despite critiquing the larger plot, Murray was "always impressed with [Adam's] costume/make-up". Furthermore, he was positively surprised that it "took [him] a minute to recognize" Adam's appearance in "Restless" sans makeup.

== See also ==
- List of Buffyverse villains and supernatural beings
