= The Truth About Juliet =

- Directed by: Sean McGinly
- Produced by: Antony I. Ginnane (executive)
- Release date: 1997
- Running time: 72 minutes
- Countries: United States; Canada
- Language: English

The Truth About Juliet is a 1997 comedy film directed by Sean McGinly. The plot concerns four friends in Los Angeles.
