= Televised Morality =

Televised Morality: The Case of BtVS
- Author: Gregory Stevenson
- Subject: Buffyverse
- Genre: academic publication, Media Study
- Publisher: Hamilton Books
- Publication date: April 28, 2004
- Pages: 316
- ISBN: 0-7618-2833-8
- OCLC: 55673027

Televised Morality: The Case of Buffy the Vampire Slayer is a 2004 academic publication relating to the fictional Buffyverse established by television series, Buffy and Angel.

The book was reviewed by Tim Craig in the Journal of Religion and Popular Culture and Ken Cukrowski in Restoration Quarterly.

== Book description ==
Televised Morality analyzes the television series Buffy the Vampire Slayer from a moral philosophy perspective.

== Contents ==
Chapter	Title
01	"Taking Buffy Seriously"
02	"The Moral Battleground"
03	"Storytellers"
04	"Buffy's Story"
05	"Buffy's World"
06	"Human Nature"
07	"Identity and the Quest for Self"
08	"A Tale of Two Slayers: Identity, Sacrifice, and Salvation"
09	"Systems of Power: Technology, Magic, and Institutional Authority"
10	"Together or Alone? The Dynamics of Community and Family"
11	"The End as Moral Guidepost"
12	"Morals and Consequences"
13	"Sexuality"
14	"Violence and Vengeance"
15	"Guilt and Forgiveness"
16	"The Vampire, the Witch and the Warlock: Patterns of Redemption"
Conclu.	"Buffy and Moral Discourse"
