= George Hertzberg =

American actor

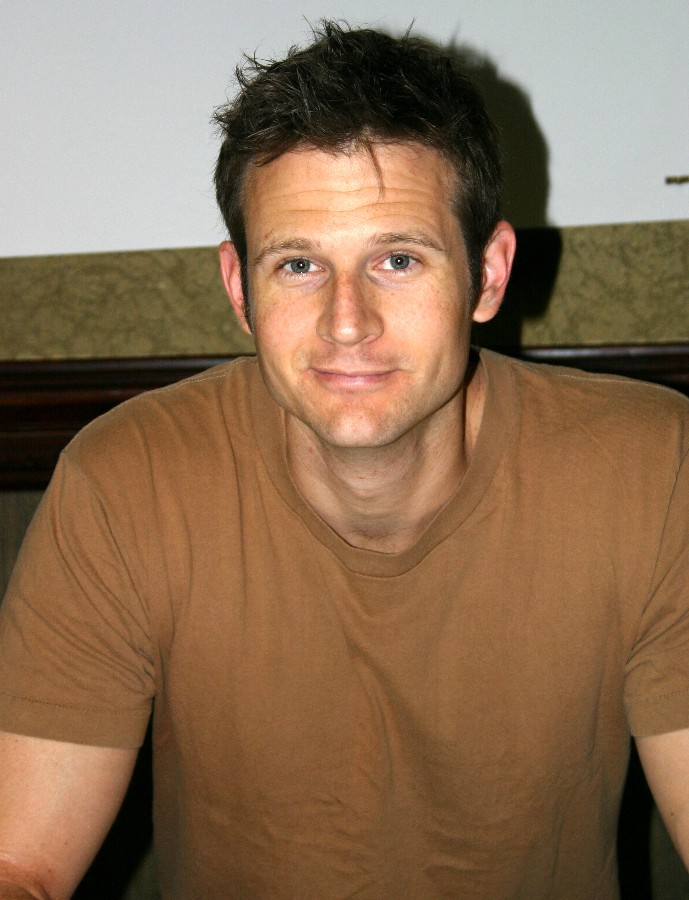
- Born: Glens Falls, New York, USA
- Years active: 1996-2008

George Hertzberg is an American actor best known for his portrayal of the cyber-demonic soldier Adam in the fourth season of the television series Buffy the Vampire Slayer. Hertzberg, who was born in Glens Falls, New York, has made appearances in several television shows, including 3rd Rock from the Sun and That's My Bush!, and wrote and produced the movie Too Much Magic.

== Filmography ==
- 3rd Rock from the Sun (1996, TV Series) as David
- Home Improvement (1998, TV Series) as Ed
- The Pornographer (1999, University of Southern California - Graduate Film Program) as Tom
- Too Much Magic (2000)
- 18 Wheels of Justice (2000, TV Series) as Police Officer
- Buffy the Vampire Slayer (2000–2002; recurring) as Adam
- Any Day Now (2001, TV Series) as Matthew Allen
- That's My Bush! (2001, TV Series) as Yuppie
- Providence (2002, TV Series)
- All of Us (2004, TV Series) as Judd
- Taken (2008) - Security Guard
- Friday Night Lights (2008, TV Series) as Scotty Simms (final television appearance)
