= Bailey Chase =

American actor (born 1972)

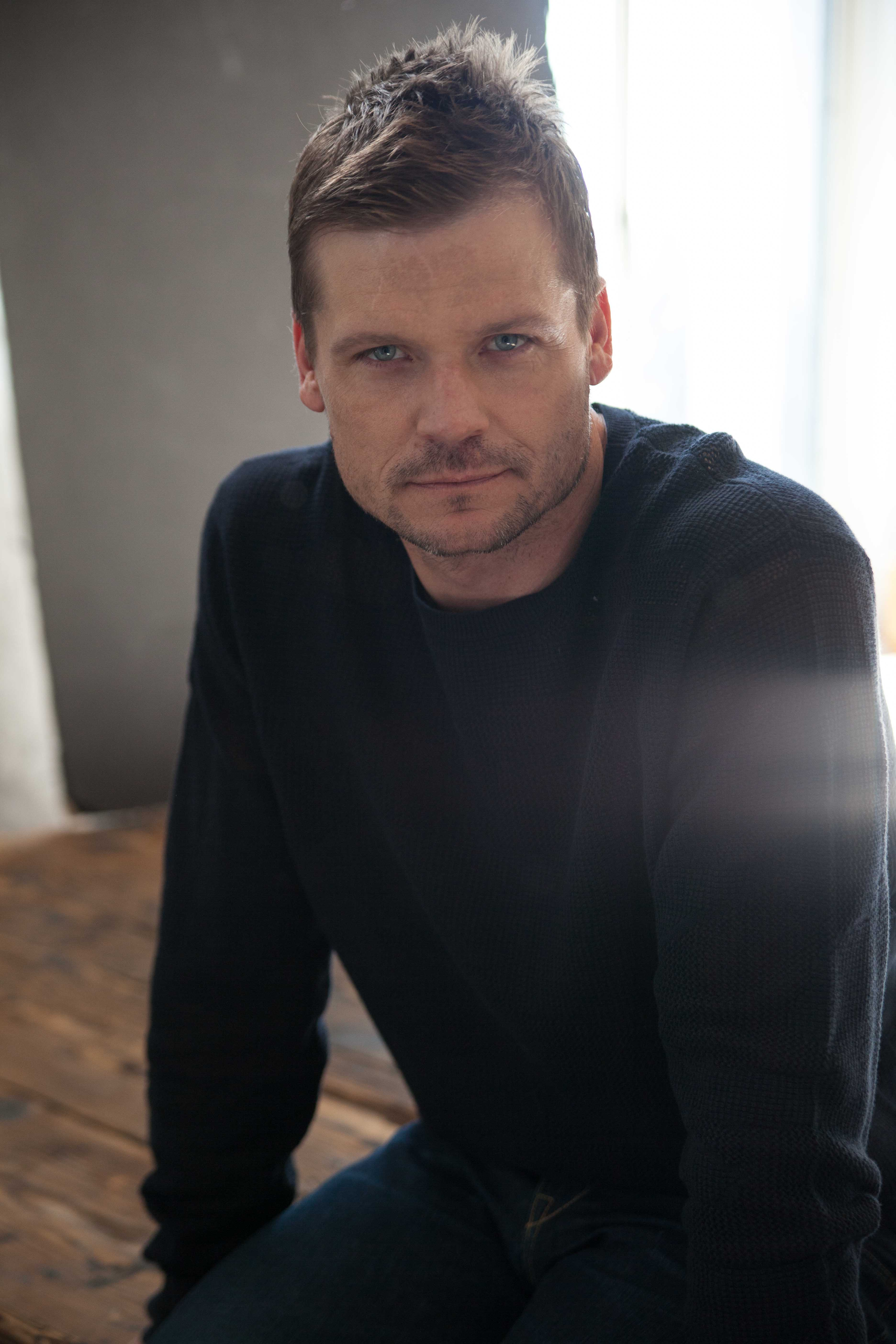
- Born: Bailey Chase Luetgert; May 1, 1972 (age 54); Chicago, Illinois, U.S.
- Education: Duke University; London Academy of Music and Dramatic Art
- Occupation: Actor
- Years active: 1996–present
- Spouse: Amy Wilson (m. 2012)
- Children: 3

Bailey Chase (born May 1, 1972) is an American film and television actor.

Chase is known for his role as Jeff Eriksson in Homestead, as Butch Ada in the television series Saving Grace, as Graham Miller in Buffy the Vampire Slayer, as Christopher "Chris" Hughes (from 2003 to 2005) in As the World Turns, and as Deputy Branch Connally in the A&E/Netflix crime thriller, Longmire.

== Early life and education ==
Chase was born in Chicago, Illinois. He spent time growing up between Barrington, Illinois and Naples, Florida, and went to the Bolles School in Jacksonville. He attended Duke University on a full football athletic scholarship and graduated in 1995 with a degree in psychology.

Taking up acting as a career, he trained at the London Academy of Music and Dramatic Art. He then moved to Los Angeles to study with various teachers including the improv group, The Groundlings.

== Career ==
Earlier in his career, he was sometimes credited as Bailey Luetgert. He was a series regular on TNT's drama, Saving Grace, in the role of Detective Butch Ada. Additional credits include Charmed, Billboard Dad, The Truth About Juliet, Undressed, Pacific Blue, Buffy the Vampire Slayer, CSI: Crime Scene Investigation, Ugly Betty, Criminal Minds, Law & Order: Special Victims Unit, and Awake, among others.

In 2012, he was cast as Deputy Branch Connally, a foil to the lead, on the A&E western mystery series Longmire. Following his departure from Longmire, he appeared in 2016 on the NBC fantasy-drama Grimm as Lucien Petrovich, leader of the Wesen uprising. He appeared in the fifth-season episodes "Eve of Destruction", "Key Move," and "Into The Schwarzwald".

In September 2016, Deadline Hollywood announced that Chase had joined the cast of the Fox TV series 24: Legacy as Thomas Locke, agent and head of field operations at CTU. The show aired on February 5, 2017, following the Super Bowl, prior to moving to a Monday-evening time slot. He joined the cast of CBS series S.W.A.T. in 2019.

== Filmography ==
=== Film ===
Year	Title	Role	Notes
1998	Billboard Dad	Brad Thomas	Video
1998	The Truth About Juliet	Willie / Dirk	
1998	Cosmo's Tale	Flicker	
2000	The Stray	Keith	
2003	Rats	Johnny Falls	
2003	Clark, the Canadian Hockey Goalie		Short
2009	The Chronicles of Hollow Earth: The Next Race	Aiden Pryme	Short
2009	Crossing Over	Border Patrol Agent Farrell	
2010	Dark Metropolis	Aiden Pryme	
2015	The Boy Next Door	Benny	
2015	Sex, Death and Bowling	Rick McAllister	
2016	The Chaplain	Ryan Davis	Short
2016	No Beast So Fierce	Charlie Sundstrom	
2016	Kadence	Joel Kaul	Short
2016	Batman v Superman: Dawn of Justice	Python Team Leader	
2018	Silver Lake	Dan	
2019	Walk. Ride. Rodeo.	Cory Snyder	
2023	Left Behind: Rise of the Antichrist	Nicolae Carpathia	
2023	Far Haven	Hunter Braddock	
2024	Homestead	Jeff Eriksson	
2025	Sod & Stubble	Henry Ise	
TBA	Tao of Surfing	Lance	Post-production

=== Television ===
Year	Title	Role	Notes
1996	Hot Line	Jake	"The Brunch Club"
1996	Baywatch	Dave	"Shark Fever"
1996	Saved by the Bell: The New Class	Zach Newton	"Wrestling with Failure"
1997	Step by Step	Scott	"Future Shock"
1997	USA High	Hunky Delivery Guy	"For Whom the Bell Tolls"
1997	Sweet Valley High	Christian Gorman	"West Coast Story: Parts 1 & 2", "Rumble in the Valley"
1998	The Drew Carey Show	Mark	"Drew's Cousin"
1998	Charmed	Alec	"I've Got You Under My Skin"
1999	Undressed	Steve	"They Call It Puppet Love Parts 1 & 2"
1999	Pacific Blue	Zach	"Just a Gigolo"
1999–2000	Buffy the Vampire Slayer	Graham Miller	Recurring role (season 4 & 5)
2000	JAG	PO James Elling	"The Princess and the Petty Officer"
2002	V.I.P.	James Gilroy	"The K Files"
2003–2005	As the World Turns	Chris Hughes	Recurring role
2005	Las Vegas	Jake Porter	Guest role
2005	CSI: Crime Scene Investigation	Marty 'The Meat Machine' Mayron	"Dog Eat Dog"
2006–2007	Watch Over Me	Steve	Main role
2007	Ugly Betty	Becks Scott	Guest role
2007	Criminal Minds	James Colby Baylor / Jason Clark Battle	"Lucky", "Penelope"
2007–2010	Saving Grace	Butch Ada	Main role
2008	Law & Order: Special Victims Unit	Lincoln Haver	"Closet"
2009	Cold Case	Roy W. Dunn	"The Brush Man"
2009	Castle	Will Sorenson	"Little Girl Lost", "A Death in the Family"
2010	Miami Medical	Rick Deleo	"Time of Death", "Medicine Man"
2011	Damages	Sean Everett	Guest role
2012	White Collar	Bryan McKenzie	"Pulling Strings"
2012	Awake	David Walker	"Guilty"
2012–2014	Longmire	Branch Connally	Main role (seasons 1–3)
2013	Summoned	Det. Michael Lyons	Television film
2014–2015	Chicago P.D.	David Lang	3 episodes
2015	Lucifer	Grey Cooper	"Pilot"
2016	Grimm	Lucien Petrovitch	"Eve of Destruction", "Key Move", "Into the Schwarzwald"
2017	24: Legacy	Thomas Locke	Recurring role
2017	Twin Peaks	Det. Don Harrison	"Part 1", "Part 5"
2018	Six	Vince Delano	"2.1", "2.2"
2019	Queen of the South	Eddie Brucks	Recurring role (season 4)
2020	S.W.A.T.	Owen Bennett	"Bad Cop", "Knockout", "Stigma"
2020	The Rookie	Michael Banks	"Control"
2020	Seal Team	Eddie Guzman	"God of War"
2022	Country Roads Christmas	Harris	Television film
2024–present	Homestead: The Series	Jeff Eriksson	Main cast

== Stage ==
- The Comedy of Errors (as Antipholus of Syracuse)
- Death of a Salesman
- Picnic
