= FilmOut San Diego =

Film festival

- Location: San Diego, California, U.S.
- Started: 1998
- Directors: Kaleb Gabriel, Michael McQuiggan
- Artistic director: Michael Mance
- Festival date: August 20, 2026 - August 23, 2026
- Website: filmoutsandiego.com

FilmOut San Diego, also known as the San Diego LGBTQ Film Festival, is an annual film festival in San Diego, California.

== History ==
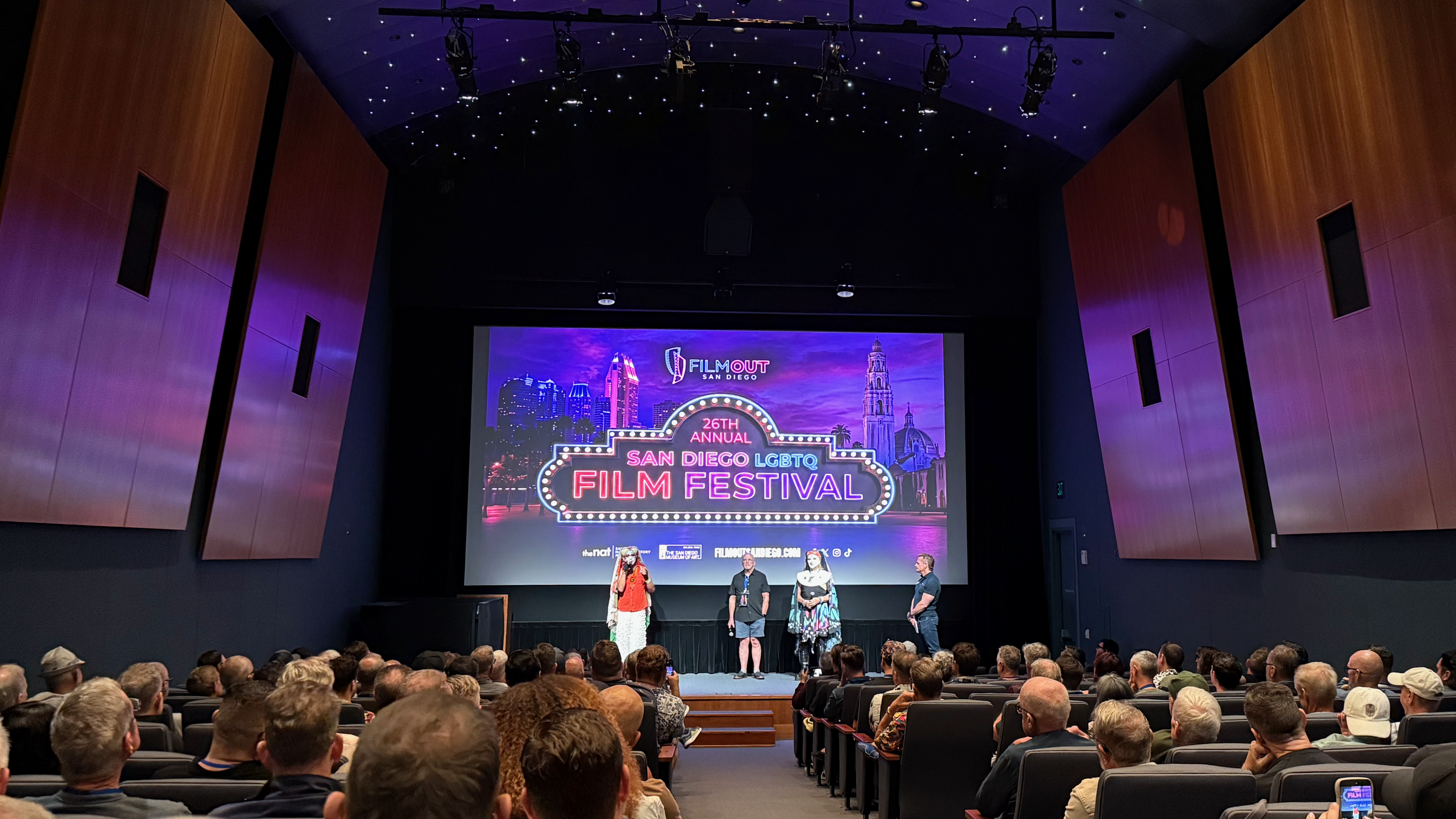
Sisters of Perpetual Indulgence at the event in 2026

Michael McQuiggan has been the festival programmer since 2003 and the venue locations include the Birch North Park Theatre, San Diego Natural History Museum and Museum of Photographic Arts.

=== Notable films ===
- Big Boys
- Fireflies in the Dusk
- Golden Delicious
- High Tide
- The Mattachine Family
- Riley
- Silver Haze
- Swallowed
- Three Nights a Week
- We All Die Alone

== FilmOut Programming Award ==
=== Freedom Award ===
- 2008: Mark Schoen and Betty Dodson
- 2009: Ensemble cast for Pedro
- 2010: Ensemble cast for Oy Vey! My Son Is Gay!!
- 2011: Harmony Santana for Gun Hill Road
- 2012: Caner Alper & Mehmet Binay for Zenne Dancer
- 2013: Robert L. Camina for Raid of the Rainbow Lounge
- 2014: Mike Skiff for Folsom Forever
- 2015: Erica Tremblay for In the Turn
- 2016: Robert L. Camina for Upstairs Inferno
- 2017: Josh Howard for The Lavender Scare
- 2018: Terrence McNally for Every Act of Life
- 2021: Stephanie Sellars and Benjamin Feuer for Lust Life Love
- 2022: Travis Fine for Two Eyes
- 2023: Marc Saltarelli for Studio One Forever
- 2024: Jules Rosskam for Desire Lines
- 2025: Chase Joynt for State of Firsts

=== Outstanding Emerging Talent ===
- 2008: James Vasquez for Ready? OK!
- 2009: Alex Loynaz for Pedro
- 2010: David Kittredge for Pornography: A Thriller
- 2011: Ben Bonenfant for Strapped and Sarah Stouffer for Bloomington
- 2012: Nathan Adloff for Nate & Margaret
- 2013: Dave Scala for Grotto
- 2014: Michelle Hendley for Boy Meets Girl
- 2015: Michiel Thomas for Game Face
- 2016: Connor Jessup for Closet Monster and Reef Ireland for Downriver
- 2017: McGhee Monteith for He Could've Gone Pro
- 2018: Jamal Douglas for The Quiet Room
- 2021: Wes Hurley for Potato Dreams of America
- 2022: Christopher Matias Aguila for Hotter Up Close
- 2023: Alex Diaz and Alan Cammish for Glitter & Doom
- 2024: Lou Goossens for Young Hearts
- 2025: Mathias Broe for Sauna

=== Outstanding Artistic Achievement ===
- 2008: Jamie Babbit for Itty Bitty Titty Committee
- 2009: Nick Oceano for Pedro
- 2010: Nancy Kissam for Drool
- 2011: Jesús Garay for Eloïse's Lover
- 2012: Rolla Selbak for Three Veils
- 2013: Kai Stänicke for Cold Star & It's Consuming Me
- 2014: Zachary Halley for Grind
- 2015: Dean Francis for Drown
- 2016: Laurent Boileau for Lady of the Night
- 2017: Eli Mak for Devil Wears a Suit
- 2018: Drew Lint for M/M
- 2021: Jonathan Butterell for Everybody's Talking About Jamie
- 2022: Roman Němec for Where Butterflies Don't Fly
- 2023: Tom CJ Brown for Christopher at Sea
- 2024: Marwan Mokbel for The Judgement
- 2025: Felipe Sholl for Streets of Gloria

=== Filmmaker Career Achievement (Lifetime) ===
- 2011: Randal Kleiser
- 2012: Del Shores
- 2013: Divine
- 2015: Tab Hunter
