= Metropolitan Community Church of New Orleans =

Coordinates: 29.9484°N 90.1280°W

- Metropolitan Community Church of New Orleans
- Metropolitan Community Church of New Orleans
- Location: 5401 S. Claiborne Ave. New Orleans, Louisiana 70125
- Country: United States
- Denomination: Universal Fellowship of Metropolitan Community Churches
- Website: www.mccneworleans.com

History
- Former names: Vieux Carre Metropolitan Community Church, Big Easy Metropolitan Community Church ( -2012)
- Founded: Early 1970s
- Founder: Reverend William "Bill" Larson
- Events: 1973 UpStairs Lounge arson attack 2005 Hurricane Katrina 2016 Relocated to 5401 S. Claiborne Ave.

Metropolitan Community Church of New Orleans (formerly known as Vieux Carre Metropolitan Community Church. Metropolitan Community Church of Greater New Orleans and Big Easy Metropolitan Community Church ) is an LGBT-affirmative church in New Orleans. It is a member of the Metropolitan Community Church denomination, and has not held a dedicated edifice for the majority of its history.

The 1998 memorial for the 1973 UpStairs Lounge arson attack and fire proved to be a turning point for the modern LGBTQ modern rights movement in New Orleans when mourners refused to avoid TV cameras and media awaiting outside the service. Instead of using the side exit and leaving through an alley the 300-strong crowd sang "United We Stand", a theme song of the gay bar, as they left the memorial service through the front doors. Previous to this the LGBTQ community was closeted and underground. The fire was called the "first gay tragedy of the modern rights movement" and "the last major national news event in the gay community to go almost completely unreported by the national media."

== History ==
The Metropolitan Community Church has a long history in the city of New Orleans, dating back to the 1970s. A small congregation, led by Reverend William "Bill" Larson, formed in 1971 and first started holding Sunday afternoon services at St. George's Episcopal Church run by Father Bill P. Richardson, a minister who had employed gays as assistant ministers and had just recently returned from a summer Union Theological Seminary seminar entitled "Homosexuality, Women's Liberation, and Communal Living." The Gay Liberation Front had recently collapsed and Richardson was determined to assist the LGBTQ community to "accept themselves." St. George's even opened an alternative bookstore which stocked feminist and gay liberation titles. MCC New Orleans met at St. George's for the first six months of its existence. They then met at the Up Stairs Lounge before moving to Larson's apartment in 1973 until June 24, 1973, when the UpStairs Lounge arson attack took the lives of Larson and other members of the congregation. It was one of two dozen attacks on MCC churches over the years, but it was the deadliest eventually taking thirty-two lives including both the pastor and associate pastor, the casualties included one third of the local MCC chapter. The New Orleans church was one of 36 MCC's in the country, MCC was emerging and remains one of the largest membership LGBT organizations in the world. According to Out For Good authors Dudley Clendinen and Adam Nagourney, it was "the first gay tragedy of the modern gay rights movement," and possibly "the last major national news event in the gay community to go almost completely unreported by the national media." The lounge was crowded with members of the congregation and revelers celebrating the final night of their Gay pride weekend. The fire had been set on the stairs to the upstairs bar between the street door and the "solid fire door" at the second-floor entrance. The "canvas awning over the street door was untouched." From the night of the fire the New Orleans Police Department, the State Fire Marshall's Office and the Fire Prevention Bureau treated the blaze as an arson and repeatedly spoke of it in that light. The police department's chief of detectives, Major Henry Morris, said there was hints of firebombing, but no evidence to prove it. No lighter or trace of gasoline was found. It was the deadliest fire in the city for nearly two hundred years and No one was ever convicted of the crimes.

The gay community had several violent fire attacks in the same period, The Advocate noted that since the 1969 Stonewall Riots there had been several terrorist attacks in 1973 against the gay community with two San Francisco bars "going up in flames," a Boston bar being bombed, and the worst being the gay club fire in New Orleans. In the same year fires also targeted MCC churches, two in January and April destroyed the "mother church" of the MCC in Los Angeles, and in July the San Francisco MCC was destroyed by arson. MCC church founder Troy Perry flew in to oversee a memorial service for the victims of the New Orleans fire. Perry, in searching for a church to hold the service was turned down by every church but one, St. Marks United Methodist Church. Years earlier the congregation's representative to the board of the Greater New Orleans Federation of Churches had resigned because the federation refused admission to the New Orleans MCC. Attending the service was the only religious official to publicly show any support, he was from a small Methodist church, a married minister Finis Crutchfield. It was later revealed Crutchfield was a closeted gay man but rose within the Methodist Church to become a bishop in the Texas conference. As part of the now annual Gay Rights Parade Day at the end of June (to mark the anniversary of the 1969 Stonewall Riots) the Miami celebration of 200 marchers later held a memorial service for the gays killed in the fire. Perry had also telegrammed the Roman Catholic Governor, Edwin Edwards, to declare a day of mourning for the fire victims but after first denying the telegram had been delivered, declined to respond, then stated that the governor was away. Because the victims were all patrons at a gay bar several families refused to claim their sons. Perry and MCC associates made arrangements for services and created a national appeal for funds to aid the victims. It was the first national fundraising in the gay community and brought in $13,000 ($94,284 in present-day terms). Within a week of the fire a Gay People's Coalition formed "offering counseling, a VD clinic and a 'gay switchboard' number."

In 1977 Anita Bryant's Christian fundamentalists Save Our Children campaign, the first organized opposition to the gay rights movement defeating an ordinance banning discrimination in areas of housing, employment, and public accommodation based on sexual orientation, became the first formalized opposition to the modern LGBT movement which traces its originals to the 1969 Stonewall Riots. Then-pastor Ron Pannell, like many LGBT activists, spoke out against her and organized a protest in the city's French Quarter to protest a concert by the singer. In 1979, the Universal Fellowship of MCC, the organizing body of leadership of the MCC churches, applied for membership in the National Council of the Churches of Christ in the USA (NCC), several Jewish and Muslim groups have had observer status for years. The effort was to eliminate religious abuse of LGBT people. In 1979 the NCC held their annual convention of the board in New Orleans where the local MCC coordinated activities designed to keep pressure on the issue rather than formal protests. The main activity, that NCC surprisingly helped promote to its board members, was a forum on the Christian right that had called for spiritual violence against LGBT people.

From 1994 to 2006, the church was led by Dexter Brecht, who renamed the church from Vieux Carre MCC to MCC of Greater New Orleans. In 2001 the 25th anniversary of the church's fire was marked including a jazz funeral procession from the Royal Sonesta to the site of the fire, a memorial plaque was planned for the location. The church has named a day/activity center for HIV positive adults "The Living Room" in honor of the fire victims, the annual Gay Appreciation Awards gala was a benefit for the project.

In mid-2005 the congregation signed a one-year lease with the Roman Catholic Archdiocese of New Orleans while it looked for a more permanent home. The Roman Catholic Archdiocese later kicked out the group after three months because, according to their spokesman, "The Catholic Church teaches that gay sex is 'intrinsically disordered' [and] "continuing the lease might give the wrong impression about Catholic teaching." The congregation was strategizing how to respond and where to relocate when deadly and destructive Hurricane Katrina, hit the city. It was the costliest natural disaster, as well as one of the five deadliest hurricanes, in the history of the United States.

Immediately after Hurricane Katrina in August 2005 the congregation met at the Lesbian and Gay Community Center, itself in jeopardy from the storm. Then relocated to meet at St. Matthew United Church of Christ west of the Garden District. The group was about half of what it was pre-hurricane. The storm also galvanized the group to not only coordinate donations, reconstruction, and providing services to victims but also to be "political, calling for a 'spiritual response' [...] to the government's lack of help. To mark the one-year anniversary of Katrina the congregation "teamed with four other MCC churches along the Gulf Coast to host a "Rainbow Revival.""

During the Hurricane Rita-disaster, the church held services at the MCC of Baton Rouge. From 2007 to 2011, the church was headed by British-born Clinton Crawshaw, who renamed it to Big Easy MCC. In January 2012 the congregation renamed it to the Metropolitan Community Church of New Orleans.

On December 1, 2013, the MCC of New Orleans moved to a new location. They moved to 6200 St. Charles Ave. New Orleans, LA 70118. Service time also changed to 10am.

On December 4, 2016 MCC New Orleans moved to a new location to share space with the First Presbyterian Church of New Orleans at 5401 S. Claiborne Ave. New Orleans, LA 70125. Service time will continue to be at 10am.
