= Allison McAtee =

American actress

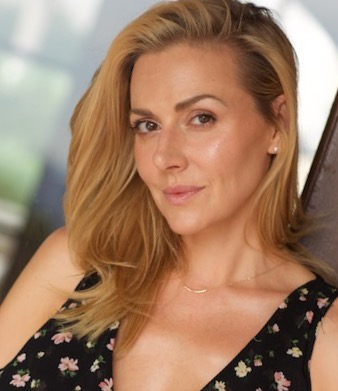
- Occupations: Actress, model
- Years active: 1999–present
- Modeling information
- Hair color: Blonde
- Eye color: Brown eyes
- Website: allisonmcatee.com

Allison McAtee is an American actress and producer. She played Catherine Stark in the independent film Bloomington (2010) and Maggie Day in the primetime series drama The Haves and the Have Nots.

== Early life and education ==
Allison McAtee grew up in Edinboro, Pennsylvania. She began modeling in New York City as a teen, and after graduating from General McLane High School in 1997, she studied theatre at the University of Pittsburgh's Dietrich School of Arts and Sciences, Imperial College London, and Carnegie Mellon University's College of Fine Arts. She holds a BA degree in theater arts from the University of Pittsburgh.

== Career ==
=== Television ===
McAtee began her career appearing in stage productions Off-Broadway in New York City. She made her television debut on Rescue Me followed by Hope and Faith in 2005. She later guest-starred on Ugly Betty, Law & Order: Criminal Intent, CSI: Crime Scene Investigation, its spin-offs CSI: Miami and CSI: NY, and Castle, The Mentalist, NCIS, and Revenge. McAtee was also a recurring guest star for two seasons on Showtime's Californication.

In 2014, McAtee joined the cast of the Oprah Winfrey Network primetime drama, The Haves and the Have Nots. She plays Maggie Day, campaign manager to Jim Cryer (John Schneider) and David Harrington (Peter Parros). She was promoted to regular cast member as of third season.

In June 2021, McAtee was reunited with Bloomington co-star Sarah Stouffer when she guest starred in two episodes of the web series Grey Area. The pair's shared scenes made tongue-in-cheek references to Bloomington.

=== Films ===
In film, McAtee has appeared in The Killing Floor (2007), Hell Ride (2008) and Iron Man (2008) before landing the leading role in the independent drama Bloomington (2010).

== Filmography ==
=== Film ===
Year	Title	Role	Notes
2003	Why We Had to Kill Bitch	Heather	
2007	The Killing Floor	Kathy Mahoni	
2008	Hell Ride	The Swede	
2008	Iron Man	Dubai Beauty	
2008	Distrust	Valerie	Short
2010	Elevator Girl	Cynthia	TV movie
2010	Bloomington	Catherine	
2013	5 Souls	Sara	
2014	Just Be Yourself	Lola	TV movie
2014	Share	Kate	Short
2016	The Wrong House	Kathleen	TV movie
2017	All About the Money	Bethany Vanderbilt	
2019	We Summon the Darkness	Susan Butler	
2020	Deadly Daughter Switch	Viv	
2020	Deadly Mile High Club	Tanya	TV movie
2020	Unearth	Christina Dolan	
2021	Mommune	Dianne	
2021	An Organized Killer	Grace	TV movie
2021	Why?	Blake	
2021	Deceived by My Mother-In-Law	Kristen	TV movie
2021	Cheer for Your Life	Meg Braverman	TV movie
2023	A Nurse to Die For	Victoria	TV movie
2023	Lonesome Soldier	Teresa	
2024	The Wrong Life Coach	Liz Kimble	TV movie

=== Television ===
Year	Title	Role	Notes
2002	One Life to Live	Jett	Episode: "Episode #1.8954" & "#1.8955"
2005	Hope & Faith	Candy	Episode: "Another Car Commercial"
2005	Stella	Hipster Model	Episodes: "Coffee Shop"
2006	Rescue Me	Bartender	Episodes: "Satisfaction" & "Karate"
2006	Ugly Betty	Friday Night	Episode: "The Lyin', the Watch and the Wardrobe"
2006	Law & Order: Criminal Intent	Carrie	Episode: "Country Crossover"
2007	Ghost Whisperer	Martina Rose	Episode: "The Collector"
2008	CSI: Miami	Shannon Higgins	Episode: "Going Ballistic"
2009	Nip/Tuck	Bartender	Episode: "Ronnie Chase"
2009	Life	Claudia	Episode: "Hit Me Baby"
2009	CSI: Crime Scene Investigation	Jena Mackin	Episode: "Kill Me if You Can"
2009	Trust Me	Woman in Movie Trailer	Episode: "The More Things Change"
2010	Castle	Andrea Fisher	Episode: "A Deadly Game"
2011	Californication	Roberta Greenblatt	Episode: "The Recused"
2011	CSI: NY	Jackie Thompson	Episode: "Exit Strategy"
2011	The Mentalist	Jocelyn Chapin	Episode: "Little Red Book"
2012	NCIS	Spandaxia	Episode: "Secrets"
2012	Jan	Carla	Episode: "Dunce"
2013	Californication	Ali Andrews	Episode: "Hell Bent for Leather"
2014	Revenge	Jennifer Foley	Episode: "Renaissance"
2014–16	The Haves and the Have Nots	Margaret "Maggie" Day	Recurring Cast: Season 1-2, Main Cast: Season 3
2017	Over Easy	Aurora	Main Cast
2019	The Affair	Laine	Episode: "Episode #5.2"
2021	Lucifer	Elizabeth Newman	Episode: "Nothing Lasts Forever"
2021	Keeping Up with the Joneses	Jess	Episode: "The Wrong Family"
2021	Truth Be Told	Taffy Carr	Episode: "Ghosts At The Feast"
2023	As Luck Would Have It	Jill	Episode: "Old Flames, New Fires"

=== Stage ===
Year	Title	Role	Notes
1999	Midsummer Night's Dream	Helena	Studio Theatre
2000	Fefu and her friends	Paula	University of Pittsburgh Repertory Theatre
2001	For Whom the Southern Belle Tolls	Amanda	University of Pittsburgh Repertory Theatre
2002	In the Colony	Rasa	Pittsburgh Civic Light Opera
2003	Why we had to kill Bitch JP Nickle	Heather Film (LB)	Five Cent Productions
2003–04	Confessions of a Wonderbabe	Wonderbabe Theatre	The Project
2005	Julianne Caesar	Megan/Brutus Theatre	Overdrive Productions

== Philanthropy ==
Allison McAtee supports Art of Elysium, Young Storytellers and Love146.
