= Studio One Forever =

- Directed by: Marc Saltarelli
- Production companies: Studio One Productions; Line 9 Productions
- Release date: July 18, 2023 (Outfest LA Film Festival)
- Country: United States
- Language: English

Studio One Forever is a 2023 documentary film by Marc Saltarelli about Studio One, an LGBT nightclub in West Hollywood, California. The film was initially scheduled to release in the United States in 2020, but it faced production delays and funding shortages due to the COVID-19 pandemic.

It premiered at the Outfest LA Film Festival on July 18, 2023.

== Awards and nominations ==
Sources: IMDB Database

Year	Award	Category	Recipient(s)	Result
2024	Palm Springs International Film Festival	Best of the Fest – Audience Vote (Feature Documentary)	Marc Saltarelli; Stephen Israel; Michael Alden	Won
2024	Hollywood Reel Independent Film Festival	Best LGBTQ Film	Marc Saltarelli	Won
2024	Chita Rivera Awards	Best Direction of a Documentary	Marc Saltarelli	Nominated
2023	Austin Film Festival	Jury Award – Documentary Feature	Marc Saltarelli (director); Stephen Israel (producer); Michael Alden (producer)	Nominated
2023	FilmOut San Diego	FilmOut Programming Award – Freedom Award	Marc Saltarelli	Won
2023	North Carolina Gay and Lesbian Film Festival	Audience Award – Best Documentary Feature	Marc Saltarelli	Won
2023	Long Beach QFilm Festival	Best Documentary Feature – Jury Award	Marc Saltarelli	Won
2023	OUTshine Film Festival	Audience Award – Special Mention	Marc Saltarelli	Nominated
2023	OUT at the Movies International LGBT Film Festival	Jury Award – Best Documentary Feature	Marc Saltarelli; Stephen Israel	Won
2023	OutReels Cincinnati	Audience Choice Award – Favorite Documentary	Marc Saltarelli; Stephen Israel	Won
