= Finis Alonzo Crutchfield Jr. =

American Methodist bishop

Finis Alonzo Crutchfield
- Born: August 22, 1916; Henrietta, Texas
- Died: May 21, 1987 (aged 70); Houston, Texas
- Occupations: Methodist minister and bishop
- Years active: 1940–1984

Finis Alonzo Crutchfield Jr. (August 22, 1916 – May 21, 1987) was a noted American clergyman and a bishop in the United Methodist Church. He began his pastoral career after graduating from Duke University Divinity School in 1940. His first assignment was First United Methodist Church in Oklahoma City, Oklahoma. He remained there until he was sent to Norman, Oklahoma, in 1950. Ten years later he became senior pastor at Boston Avenue Methodist Church in Tulsa. He was credited with bringing Oral Roberts into the Methodist Church (although Roberts later left) and served as a negotiator in the 1968 merger of the Methodist Church with the Evangelical United Brethren Church.

In 1972, he was elected as a bishop and sent to New Orleans. In 1976, he was sent to Texas as bishop of the Texas Conference, headquartered in Houston. He retired in 1984, and died of AIDS in 1987.

== Early life ==
Crutchfield was born in Henrietta, Texas, on August 22, 1916. His father, Finis Crutchfield Sr., was a Methodist minister, as was his paternal grandfather. The father was sent by the church to many different towns while his son was growing up. These included Denton, Wichita Falls, Denison and Dallas. (Note: Finis Jr. was five years old when his father was posted to the Tyler Street Methodist Church. There, he first met Benja Lee Bell, who would marry him twenty years later.) His older sister, Artha, was the wife of Alsie Carlson, who was also a Methodist minister and later a bishop.

== Career as pastor ==
Crutchfield attended Southern Methodist University, where he was elected president of the student council in 1934. It was there where he demonstrated a gifted speaking ability. He then enrolled in Duke University where he earned a degree from the Duke Divinity School in 1940; his thesis was entitled "Christian principles in the teachings of Epictetus". Shortly after graduation, he married Benja Lee Bell. The Methodist Church then assigned him to First United Methodist Church in Oklahoma City, Oklahoma. During that assignment, Benja Lee bore their only child, a son named Charles. Finis stayed in that position until he was assigned to the McFarlin Memorial United Methodist Church in Norman, Oklahoma, in 1950. He was only 34 years old, relatively young for such a high position in such an important church. He proved that he could fill the sanctuary with his exceptional oratory ability, persuade people to make monetary gifts to the church and inspire many younger people to join the ministry. He was elected to the General Conference in 1956. He was the delegation's leader for the next four conferences because he was the top vote-getter. In 1960, he was sent to the Boston Avenue Methodist Church in Tulsa. The Boston Avenue church was often regarded as a stepping stone on the path to becoming a bishop in the Methodist Church. The church is one of (if not the) largest and wealthiest of its denomination in Oklahoma. Five of its senior pastors have been elevated to that high position. Crutchfield was focused on growing the church's membership, so he started televising his Sunday services. He even dared controversy by inviting the well-known televangelist, Oral Roberts to become a member of the Methodist church.

Crutchfield was noted for his zeal in revitalizing and expanding the membership of the Methodist Church. He would even generate controversy by his ways of doing so. One of his most controversial (and successful) efforts might be called the Oral Roberts Affair. Oral Roberts, best known as a Pentecostal evangelist, shocked many when he formally joined Boston Avenue Methodist Church on March 17, 1968. Initially, the act appeared to be a hasty occurrence, but it was later revealed to have resulted from discussions over a period of time between Roberts and Crutchfield. Crutchfield then arranged a meeting between Roberts and Angie W. Smith, then the Methodist bishop over the Oklahoma Conference and who was Crutchfield's superior. Crutchfield reassured Roberts by saying, "I have fine men in my church who are from your university. (Note: The statement refers to Oral Roberts University (ORU), which the evangelist founded and which continues to have ties to the Pentecostal Church.) ... They are the most effective Christians in my church." Roberts said, "do you know they all speak in tongues ... (and) in healing?" Crutchfield replied that he was very aware of that, adding, "They're not carrying this around as a badge of superiority. They're interested in helping people and building the kingdom."

Both Smith and Roberts saw advantages from such a move. For Roberts, it represented moving into the mainstream of American Protestantism. For Smith, Roberts' dynamism and creativity was like a magnet for attracting new members. Although there were theological differences between Methodist and Pentecostal doctrines and practices, those could be overlooked by compromise. (Note: Examples of such differences include faith healing and speaking in tongues, both practiced by Pentecostals, but not by Methodists.) Bishop Smith agreed that Roberts could continue his evangelistic mission unfettered by rules of the Methodist Church. After several discussions, Smith reportedly told Roberts, "We need you, but we need the Holy Spirit more than we need you, and we've got to have the Holy Spirit in the Methodist Church."

After joining the Boston Avenue church, Roberts completed a course about Methodist doctrine that would qualify him as a minister. Church officials agreed to accept his Pentecostal ordination, allowing him to become a Methodist minister. Roberts explained afterward that there would be "no change in my standard of the Full Gospel message or of my life, my ministry, or of ORU." Crutchfield followed up by saying to Roberts' followers, "The Methodist Church ... does not seek to impose conformity on its members and it encourages every sincere approach to God."

== Service as bishop ==
Finis Crutchfield was elected a bishop of the Methodist Church by the annual conference in 1972. After serving the church in Oklahoma for 32 years, he was posted to lead the Louisiana Conference, headquartered in New Orleans. In 1976, he was made bishop of the Texas Conference, headquartered in Houston. He was then elected to a one-year term as president of the Council of Bishops in 1982.

As bishop, Crutchfield had a strong desire to revitalize the churches in his diocese. Their congregations had been declining in size and influence for several years, like many other mainstream churches. He began requiring the ministers in his diocese to report monthly how many members they had gained or lost, how many people came to Sunday school and how many came to the regular Sunday services. He rewarded ministers who made passing grades with congratulatory letters or phone calls. He rewarded those with appointments to more prestigious churches, when the time came.

On June 24, 1973, the UpStairs Lounge, a gay bar in New Orleans' French Quarter caught fire and burned. (Note: Time magazine wrote that: "all signs pointed to arson, but the police investigation ran cold. No one was ever prosecuted.") Thirty two people died in the fire, including Reverend Bill Larson, the local minister of the Universal Fellowship of Metropolitan Community Churches (UFMCC). The lounge had recently served as a temporary home for the UFMCC in New Orleans, and although that function had recently moved to another site, this was the third fire in the first half of 1973 at a UFMCC church facility (Note: The UFMCC is a church founded in 1968 by Reverend Troy Perry to minister to gay people, who were often unwelcome in other churches.) Troy Perry, founder of the UFMCC, flew to New Orleans from Los Angeles to organize a funeral service for the victims. Every church he asked to let him use its sanctuary for the service rejected his request. Bishop Crutchfield authorized a small Methodist church in the French Quarter to provide its space. The service was held there on July 1, 1973. Bishop Crutchfield was among the 200 people who attended. (Note: Other sources reported that St. George's Episcopal Church held an unauthorized commemorative service in New Orleans on the night after the fire. Father William Richardson, then rector of the church had volunteered the use of his church. He said that Bishop Crutchfield offered the use of Rampart Street Methodist Church for another service on the following Sunday.) Huffington Post later reported the attendance at the July 1 service was 250.

Crutchfield retired from his church career in 1984. One of his last official acts was to attend and speak at the Methodist General Conference in that year, where he made a speech supporting the church's opposition to homosexuality. He and his wife then moved back to Houston, where, in 1985, he began to work with people suffering from AIDS.

== Death ==
The bishop had always enjoyed robust health until 1986. While preaching at St. Paul's United Methodist Church in Houston, he became so hoarse from coughing that he could not continue speaking. He saw a specialist, but the doctor could not diagnose the real cause. Then he began to have digestive problems and difficulty sleeping. A case of influenza developed into pneumonia around Thanksgiving, and he was admitted to Houston Methodist Hospital for treatment. Early in January 1987, the doctors informed his family that he had acquired immune deficiency syndrome (AIDS).

His death became an object of controversy due to speculation over the manner in which he contracted AIDS. He insisted to the end of his life that he was heterosexual and he did not admit to any high-risk activities. This resulted in some measure of popular panic that AIDS was communicable through casual contact, later disproven.

Finis Crutchfield was hospitalized in late 1986, where he remained for 162 days. He died on May 21, 1987. The death certificate listed the cause of death as AIDS. (Note: However, Yoffe said that the records of the Houston Health Department stated that the cause of the infection was, "Undetermined at this time.") Exactly how he contracted this disease was never discovered. There was no indication of intravenous drug use and the bishop denied any homosexual activity even as he was dying. (Note: Charles Crutchfield, the bishop's son, said that he and his father had an extremely candid discussion just before the father died, and that the father had solemnly said that he had never had a homosexual contact. Charles accepted his father's statements, adding that, "It is not in my father's character to have lied to me.") After his death, claims were made by acquaintances and some fellow clergy that Bishop Crutchfield had lived for decades as a closeted homosexual, which, if true, might indicate the vector for contraction of the disease. Belief that such a prominent public and religious figure had been gay had an effect on the perception of gays both within the public and within the gay community.

== Secret life ==
Rumors that Finis Crutchfield had a secret life as a non-celibate gay man began to surface soon after he moved to Tulsa. After Crutchfield died, a gay Methodist minister claimed that he had first learned of this secret from a gay partner while he was studying in seminary during the early 1960s. A former minister in Nashville claimed he had heard about Crutchfield's homosexuality also in the 1960s.

The Texas Monthly expose said that rumors were heard by some people in the Methodist ministry, who usually chose to ignore them because of lack of proof. However, a group of members at Boston Avenue church were sufficiently alarmed about the rumors that they hired a private investigator to check them out. When Crutchfield learned of this action, he responded through his own sources that he would sue the individuals involved for harassment, unless the surveillance ceased. His strategy was successful, and church authorities took no action.

Until 2024, The United Methodist Book of Discipline instructed, "The practice of homosexuality is incompatible with Christian teaching. Therefore self-avowed practicing homosexuals are not to be certified as candidates, ordained as ministers, or appointed to serve in The United Methodist Church." "'Self-avowed practicing homosexual' means that a person openly acknowledges to a bishop, district superintendent, district committee of ordained ministry, board of ordained ministry, or clergy session that the person is a practicing homosexual."

== See also ==
- Homosexuality and Methodism
- List of bishops of the United Methodist Church
- UpStairs Lounge arson attack
