= Stephanie Sellars =

American actor, musician and writer

Stephanie Sellars is an American writer, actor, singer, film director and producer. She is known for her feature film Lust Life Love, released by 1091 Pictures. She released a vocal jazz album Girl Who Loves in 2020. She wrote the Lust Life column for the New York Press from February 2006 to October 2007.

== Early life ==
She grew up in Northern New Jersey where she was active in the arts. She graduated from Gettysburg College with a BA in English and French (magna cum laude). She also attended St. Catherine's College (Oxford University) and the Institute for American Universities in Avignon, France.

== Career ==
After graduating from college, Sellars moved to New York City where she worked as an art model and acted in off-off Broadway plays and short films. She also wrote poetry, studied singing and explored various musical styles as she performed at open mics around the city.

She wrote a one-act play, Twenty Minutes of Immortality, about art modeling and the love affair between Man Ray and Lee Miller, which was produced by a small theatre company. She later adapted the play into a short screenplay which she produced and acted in with the same title. The short film caught the attention of the Independent Film Channel (IFC), which licensed the film for three years and broadcast it several times, from 2003 through 2006.

During the early to mid aughts, Sellars performed as a jazz and cabaret singer at several New York venues including The Duplex. Later, she did shows at Laurie Beechman Theater and The Triad.

Sellars wrote a regular column about sex and relationships from the perspective of a bisexual polyamorist for New York Press. She began writing the column in February 2006. Her final article appeared in October 2007. As a freelance writer, Sellars's articles have appeared in publications such as Moviemaker and Go Magazine as well as New York Press.

Sellars established her film production company, Immortality Productions, LLC in 2006, and has made several award-winning short films since then, which screened at festivals including Outfest, Frameline, Big Apple Film Festival, Cinekink, DC Shorts, Newport Beach Film Festival and Mexico International Film Festival.

Sellars received a Master of Fine Arts degree in Film at Columbia University School of the Arts.

Her debut feature film, Lust Life Love, which Sellars wrote, produced, co-directed, and acted in, is loosely based on her experience with polyamory and the column she wrote for the New York Press. The film co-stars Jake Choi (ABC’s Single Parents & American Housewife) and features Rolando Chusan (ABC's Promised Land), Makeda Declet (Awkwafina Is Nora from Queens, House Of Payne, Being Mary Jane) Bill Irwin (Tony Award Winner), and Jeanna Han (Scream Queens). Sellars began writing the screenplay as a graduate film student at Columbia University, where she met co-director Benjamin Feuer. The creative team includes Director of Photography Ari Rothschild, editor Ayelet Gil-Efrat and composers Jay Lifton and Simon Taufique. Along with Sellars, the film was produced by Alena Svyatova, and co-producers Sola Fasehun and Simon Taufique.

Following the virtual premiere in February 2021 at the Berlin Independent Film Festival, where it won Best Romance Feature, Lust Life Love was acquired by 1091, a global distribution partner and platform for film and television creators and content providers, and went on to be awarded Most Watched Film at the New Renaissance Film Festival, Best LGBTQ Feature at Queens World Film Festival, and the Freedom Award at FilmOut San Diego. On October 12, 2021, Lust Life Love was released by 1091 on Digital HD and Cable VOD.

Sellars was awarded writing and film residencies at Vermont Studio Center and Yaddo.

In 2020, she released a jazz vocal album Girl Who Loves, featuring musicians Tadataka Uno, James Cammack, Brian Fishler, and Vinny Raniolo. The album includes two duets with veteran vocalist Tony Middleton. Reviewer Susan Harriot of A&R Factory says, "Stephanie puts her own unique interpretation on each cover song, vocally reimagining these vintage songs whilst remaining true to the original message. Her vocal arrangements are subtle, artful and respectful at the same time as showing off her quirky and playful personality." And Jazz Corner: "Sellars has a sultry voice that sets the bar higher in terms of feel and dynamics, and she knows how to make the most out of her remarkable talent. If you enjoy jazz with a retro feel, you should definitely give this album a go."

Sellars received her second M.F.A. in creative non-fiction from Bennington Writing Seminars in June 2022.
