= Sarah Stouffer =

American actress (born 1986)

- Born: Sarah Stouffer; July 26, 1986 (age 39); Vacaville, California, U.S
- Occupation: Actress
- Years active: 2009–present

Sarah Stouffer (born July 26, 1986) is an American actress best known for her lead role in the independent coming-of-age 2010 film Bloomington and guest appearances in television shows like Bones and NCIS.

== Early life and education ==
Stouffer is originally from Vacaville, California, where she performed in musical theatre growing up. She moved to Los Angeles at the age of 19, working in a fondue restaurant until her acting career took off. Stouffer was home schooled. She studied and performed with the Solano Youth Theatre.

== Career ==
With largely theatre work under her belt, and no film experience, Stouffer was cast in the lead role of Jackie Kirk in the 2010 film Bloomington, written and directed by Fernanda Cardoso, in which she played the undergraduate Jackie Kirk who becomes romantically involved with psychology professor Catherine Stark (Allison McAtee). She later joked that being booked for the role was "beginner's luck". Producer Jason Shumway admitted that he initially had doubts about her playing the role as she looked so young to be dating a lecturer. "It does make it a little more controversial, I think," he added. Bloomington toured the lesbian and gay film festival circuit and Stouffer won the Outstanding Emerging Talent Award in the 2011 FilmOut Programming Awards.

Guest roles on established television series, including Bones and Criminal Minds, followed. She also landed more film roles, including the comedy-horror Chastity Bites and the television movie A Cinderella Christmas. In 2015, she played a recurring role, as Tess Ritter, in the ABC series Switched at Birth. Four years later, she had a lead role in the 2019 short Suicide Date, directed by Doug Hurley, which won Audience Award Overall Fest and Audience Award Fusion Shorts at Dances With Films in Los Angeles.

In 2018, Stouffer began creating her own content and has a series of comedy sketches on Sarah Stouffer's channel on YouTube. Three years later, she co-created the mockumentary-style web series Grey Area with Asaad Salleh, directed by Evan Moore, which is hosted on Last Second Sea's channel on YouTube. Stouffer is a co-writer and producer of Grey Area and plays the part of Kate. In June 2021 she was reunited with Bloomington co-star Allison McAtee who guest starred in two episodes of Grey Area. The pair's shared scenes made tongue-in-cheek references to Bloomington.

In 2021 she wrote, directed and starred in the short What About Us?.

Stouffer also works with video production company Who Shoots Your Films? as a producer and director.

== Personal life ==
Stouffer lives in Los Angeles with the rapper, actor, writer and director, Asaad Salleh, also known as Emerson Kennedy.

== Filmography ==
=== Films ===
Year	Title	Role	Notes
2010	Bloomington	Jackie Kirk	
2012	A Day Away	Girl	Short
2013	Chastity Bites	Britney	
2013	Stay in the Car	Megan	Short
2013	Spanners	Phoe	
2013	Mourning Glory	Jessica (Best Friend 2)	Short
2014	Devil Dog	Party Girl	Short
2016	A Cinderella Christmas	Candace Karilla	Television movie
2017	Afterburn / Aftershock	Stacy Williams	
2017	Consent	Erin Rodocker	Short
2019	Suicide Date	Andrea	Short
2021	What About Us?	Sarah	Short

=== Television ===
Year	Title	Role	Notes
2009	Slacker PI	Amanda	Episode: The Race Card
2012	Workaholics	Kim	Episode: Flashback in a Day
2012	LadyPantz Presents	Rain	
2013	The New Normal	Sienna	Episode: Stay at Home Dad
2013	Betas	Melissa	Pilot
2013	Bones	Alison Taylor / Anna Samuels	Episode: The Secret in the Siege
2014	Criminal Minds	Tabitha Ryerson	Episode: Angels
2015	Switched at Birth	Tess Ritter	Recurring role
2021	NCIS	Hanna Devereaux	Episode: Misconduct

=== Other work ===
Year	Title	Role	Notes
2021–22	Grey Area	Kate	Web series
