= Marc Blucas =

American actor

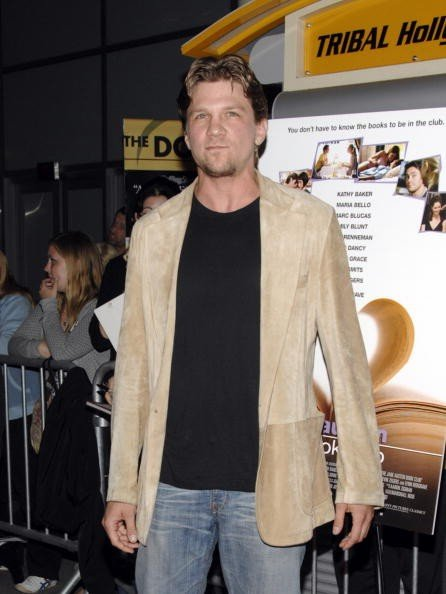
- Blucas in 2007
- Born: Marcus Paul Blucas; January 11, 1972 (age 54); Girard, Pennsylvania, U.S.
- Education: Wake Forest University (BA)
- Occupation: Actor
- Years active: 1995–present
- Spouse: Ryan Haddon (m. 2009)
- Children: 2
- Relatives: Dayle Haddon (mother-in-law)

Marcus Paul Blucas (/ˈbluːkəs/; born January 11, 1972) is an American actor. Prior to his acting career, he played college basketball with the Wake Forest Demon Deacons. He had his first starring role as soldier and love interest Riley Finn on the WB supernatural drama series Buffy the Vampire Slayer from 1999 to 2000, and later starred as football team manager Matthew Donnelly on the USA drama series Necessary Roughness from 2011 to 2013.

Blucas starred alongside Katie Holmes in the romantic comedy film First Daughter (2004) and also had lead roles in the thriller films Three (2006) and The Killing Floor (2007). He had supporting roles in the romance films I Capture the Castle (2003), After Sex (2007), and The Jane Austen Book Club (2007); the horror films They (2002), Deadline (2009), and Unearth (2020); the thriller films Brawl in Cell Block 99 (2017) and Looking Glass (2018); and the drama films Prey for Rock & Roll (2004) and Touchback (2011).

== Early life ==
Marcus Paul Blucas was born on January 11, 1972, in Butler, Pennsylvania, two years after his sister, Kristen. His parents, Walter Joseph Blucas and Mary Catherine (née Gordon), married on January 10, 1970, shortly before both graduated from Indiana University of Pennsylvania (IUP). They are divorced.

A self-confessed "square who earned good grades," Blucas was, like his father, a skilled sportsman. Wally was the quarterback on the undefeated 1968 IUP Big Indians team, competed in the Boardwalk Bowl, and in 1999 was inducted into the IUP Athletics Hall of Fame.

The family moved to Girard in Erie County, Pennsylvania, in 1974, where Blucas' father rose from teacher to school principal and ultimately to Superintendent of Schools for the District. He attended Girard High School in Erie where he graduated in 1990. Blucas became the star player on the Girard High School basketball team, leading them to the Pennsylvania Boys AA State Championship, in the process earning all-state honors and a sports scholarship to Wake Forest University. He played on the Wake Forest Demon Deacons men's basketball team and graduated in 1994 after one season playing on the same court as Tim Duncan. He was also a member of the Sigma Phi Epsilon fraternity.

After Blucas failed to make it into the NBA, he moved to England, where he played professional basketball for a year with British Basketball League's Manchester Giants (1975–2001). He later decided to become a lawyer, but changed his mind and went into acting instead.

== Career ==
Blucas's first television role was in the television movie Inflammable, made in 1995. From there, he found roles in both television and film. He starred as the Basketball Hero in Gary Ross's Pleasantville (1998). However, Blucas landed his first major role in 1999 as Agent Riley Finn in Buffy the Vampire Slayer. Initially, Blucas was certain that he had blown his audition and had left apologizing for having wasted creator Joss Whedon's time. Whedon asked him to audition again, and he received the part two weeks later. He played Buffy's love interest until 2000.

After Blucas' departure from the series, he went on to act in such films as Summer Catch (2001), We Were Soldiers (2002), alongside Mel Gibson and Chris Klein, and First Daughter (2004), with Katie Holmes. His character in Summer Catch was based on real life Cape League baseball player Michael Macone.

In 2007, Blucas began to land leading roles in films such as Thr3e and The Killing Floor.

In February 2010, Blucas joined the cast of the ABC television drama pilot True Blue.

Blucas was part of the regular cast of the USA Network show Necessary Roughness for the first two seasons, playing Matthew Donnelly. The series premiered on June 29, 2011.

== Personal life ==
On July 25, 2009, Blucas married journalist Ryan Haddon, daughter of Dayle Haddon. They have two daughters together and Blucas is the stepfather to Haddon's two children from her previous marriage to Christian Slater. Since 2012, Blucas has lived on a 15-acre farm in rural Pennsylvania.

== Filmography ==
=== Film ===
Year	Film	Role	Notes
1996	Eddie	Bench Knicks	
1998	Pleasantville	Basketball Hero	
1999	The Mating Habits of the Earthbound Human	The Female's Ex-Boyfriend	
1999	House on Haunted Hill	Period Film Actor	Scenes Deleted
2001	Jay and Silent Bob Strike Back	The Guy	Fred Jones look-alike
2001	Summer Catch	Miles Dalrymple	
2002	We Were Soldiers	2nd Lt. Henry Herrick	
2002	Sunshine State	Scotty Duval	
2002	They	Paul	
2003	I Capture the Castle	Neil Cotton	
2003	Prey for Rock & Roll	Animal	
2003	View from the Top	Tommy Boulay	
2003	One Flight Stand	Ben	Short film
2004	The Alamo	James Bonham	
2004	First Daughter	James Lamson	
2006	Thr3e	Kevin Parson	
2007	After Sex	Christopher	
2007	The Killing Floor	David Lamont	
2007	The Jane Austen Book Club	Dean Drummond	
2008	Meet Dave	Mark Rhodes	
2008	Animals	Jarrett	
2009	Deadline	David	
2009	Stay Cool	Brad Nelson	
2009	Stuntmen	Eligh Supreme	
2009	Mother and Child	Steven	
2010	Knight and Day	Rodney	
2011	Red State	ATF Sniper	
2012	Touchback	Hall	
2015	Sleeping with Other People	Chris Smith	
2016	The Red Maple Leaf	Derek Sampson	
2017	Brawl in Cell Block 99	Gil	
2018	Looking Glass	Howard	
2020	Unearth	George Lomack	
2022	Hunting Ava Bravo	Buddy King	

=== Television ===
Year	Title	Role	Notes
1995	Inflammable	Evans	Television film (CBS)
1998	Arliss	Carl McNamara	Episode: The Legacy
1999	The '60s	Buddy Wells	Television film (NBC)
1999	Clueless	Doug Sampson	Episode: "Popularity"
1999	Undressed	Bill	Episode: "If Words Could Kill #2"
1999–2000, 2002	Buffy the Vampire Slayer	Riley Finn	Main role; 31 episodes
2007	Judy's Got a Gun	Richard Palm	Television pilot
2007	House	John Kelley	Episode: "Top Secret"
2008	Eleventh Hour	Detective McNeil	Episode: "Resurrection"
2009	Lie to Me	Jack Rader	Episode: Control Factor
2009	Castle	Jeremy Preswick	Episode: "The Fifth Bullet"
2010	True Blue	JD Conlin	Television pilot
2010	Law & Order: LA	Chip Jarrow	Episode: "Playa Vista"
2011	Revenge	David Clarke	Unaired pilot
2011	Body of Proof	Dr. Mark Chandler	Episode: "Dead Man Walking"
2011–2013	Necessary Roughness	Matthew Donnally	Main role; 29 episodes
2013	Blue Bloods	Russell Burke	Episode: "The City That Never Sleeps"
2014	Killer Women	Dan Winston	Series regular
2014	Stalker	Mark Richards	Episode: "Skin"
2014	CSI: Crime Scene Investigation	Adam King	Episode: "Road to Recovery"
2015	Limitless	Nick Tanner	Episode: "This Is Your Brian on Drugs"
2016	Notorious	Eric Jessup	2 episodes
2016	Operation Christmas	Scott McGuigan	Television film (Hallmark)
2016	The Irresistible Blueberry Farm	Roy Cumberfield	Television film (Hallmark Movies & Mysteries)
2016–2017	Underground	John Hawke	Recurring role; 9 episodes
2017	Miss Christmas	Sam McNary	Television film (Hallmark)
2018	Dietland	Bobby	2 episodes
2018	Season for Love	Corey Turner	Television film (Hallmark)
2019	The Fix	Riv	10 episodes
2019	Holiday For Heroes	Matt Evans	Television film (Hallmark Movies and Mysteries)
2020	Narcos: Mexico	Rick Sacks	Episode: "Se Cayó El Sistema"
2020	Good Morning Christmas!	Brian	Television film (Hallmark Channel)
2021	Swagger	Coach Bobby	6 episodes
2022	A Christmas... Present		Television film (Great American Family)
2023–present	My Life with the Walter Boys	George Walter	Main role; 30 episodes
2026	Reacher	John Sampson	Recurring role
