= Chastity Bites =

- Promotional poster
- Directed by: John V. Knowles
- Written by: Lotti Pharriss Knowles
- Produced by: Lotti Pharriss Knowles
- Starring: Allison Scagliotti; Francia Raisa; Eddy Rioseco; Greer Grammer; Amy Okuda; Louise Griffiths
- Cinematography: Justin Thomas Ostensen
- Edited by: Phillip J. Bartell
- Music by: Voodoo Highway
- Production company: Weirdsmobile Productions
- Distributed by: Grand Entertainment Group; Gravitas Ventures
- Release date: June 1, 2013 (Dances With Films)
- Running time: 93 minutes
- Country: United States
- Language: English

Chastity Bites is a 2013 comedy-horror film written by Lotti Pharriss Knowles and directed by John V. Knowles.

== Plot ==
A feminist blogger and reporter for a school newspaper tries to stop Countess Elizabeth Báthory, who poses as an abstinence counselor in a high school, from killing the school's virgins to stay young and beautiful.

== Cast ==
- Allison Scagliotti as Leah
- Francia Raisa as Katharine
- Eddy Rioseco as Paul
- Chloë Crampton as Kelly
- Greer Grammer as Nicole
- Sarah Stouffer as Britney
- Lindsey Morgan as Noemi
- Amy Okuda as Ashley
- Louise Griffiths as Liz Batho / Elizabeth Báthory

Director Stuart Gordon appears in a cameo.

== Release ==
Chastity Bites premiered on June 1, 2013, at the Dances With Films film festival. It was released on video on demand on November 1, 2013, and on DVD on February 11, 2014.

== Reception ==
Scott Hallam of Dread Central rated it 2/5 stars and wrote that despite "some fun moments", the film fails to live up to its potential. Patrick Cooper of Bloody Disgusting rated it 3/5 stars and called it "a solid horror-comedy" that comes across as a TV show episode. Elias Savada of Film Threat rated it 3/5 stars and called it a "delightfully cheesy horror comedy". Gordon Sullivan of DVD Verdict called it a feminist film that favors comedy over horror.
