= Lonesome Soldier =

2023 film by Nino Aldi

- Directed by: Nino Aldi
- Written by: Alexander Randazzo; Lionel Chetwynd; Linda Lee
- Produced by: C. Charles Pappas; John W. Bosher; Al Capitanini; Chris Charles; Michael Davenport; Jason Kanjiro Howard; Catherine Kyritsi; Michael Laundon; Linda Lee; Steve Monroe; Jessica Olas; Alexander Randazzo; G.R. Seppala; Mary Jo Marino Stemp; Mark Wallace; Rocky Whatule
- Starring: Alexander Randazzo; John Ashton; Allison McAtee; Mohamed Karim
- Cinematography: Saulius Lukosevicius
- Edited by: Eric Dow
- Music by: Samu Csernak
- Production company: Military Movies
- Release date: November 3, 2023 (United States)
- Running time: 109 minutes
- Country: United States
- Language: English
- Box office: $51,228

Lonesome Soldier is a 2023 American war drama film directed by Nino Aldi and written by Alexander Randazzo, Lionel Chetwynd, and Linda Lee. It stars Alexander Randazzo, John Ashton, and Allison McAtee, and Mohamed Karim. Based on a true story, Lonesome Soldier follows the life of Jackson Harlow, from young dreamer to haunted war veteran in this harrowing portrayal of PTSD and the effects it has, not only on soldiers, but also their loved ones.

== Plot ==
After serving in the Iraq war, Jackson Harlow returns to Tennessee and learns that his fight is far from over. Veterans and their loved ones face many challenges while battling PTSD.

== Cast ==
- Alexander Randazzo as Jackson Harlow
- John Ashton as Mac Roberts
- Allison McAtee as Teresa
- Mohamed Karim as Dr. Rodgers
- Steve Monroe as John
- Jamie Bernadette as Doctor Chambers
- Jesse James as Lawler
- Michael Southworth as Bobby
- Zane Stephens as Marvin
- Patrick Y. Malone as Sgt. Winnfield

== Production ==
The film was independently produced and directed by Nino Aldi. The screenplay was written by Alexander Randazzo and Lionel Chetwynd.
