= The Killing Floor (2007 film) =

- Promotional film poster
- Directed by: Gideon Raff
- Written by: Gideon Raff; Ryan Swanson
- Produced by: Executive Producers: Avi Arad; Doug Liman; Producers: Gideon Raff; Eden Wurmfeld
- Starring: Marc Blucas; Shiri Appleby; Reiko Aylesworth
- Cinematography: Martina Radwan
- Edited by: Annie L. Amie
- Music by: Michael Wandmacher
- Distributed by: Lightning Entertainment
- Release date: May 21, 2007
- Running time: 94 minutes
- Country: United States
- Language: English

The Killing Floor is a 2007 American psychological horror film directed by Gideon Raff. It stars Marc Blucas, Shiri Appleby, and Reiko Aylesworth.

== Plot ==
David Lamont, a successful literary agent in New York City who is known to be ruthless toward friends, foes, and clients alike, moves into his new penthouse apartment. There he meets his mysterious and beautiful neighbor, Audrey Lavine, who lives on the third floor.

Shortly thereafter, he receives a visit from an investigator and a man who claims that the penthouse belongs to his father who never sold it. David tells them the apartment is his, everything is in legal order, and if they have a problem to talk with his lawyer.

Soon after he starts receiving mysterious and increasingly disturbing packages. The first package contains photographs of violent crimes, seemingly taken within his new apartment. As the days progress, the packages become more ominous, including DVDs that show David's every move, indicating he is being watched constantly.

David’s sense of security erodes as he realizes that someone has access to his apartment. He enlists the help of his friend and colleague, Rebecca Fay, and hires a private investigator, Detective Martin Soll, to uncover who might be behind the surveillance and the threatening messages.

As the investigation deepens, David learns about the apartment's dark history, which includes a series of brutal murders. The sense of paranoia grows as he becomes suspicious of everyone around him.

The tension reaches a climax when David discovers hidden cameras and evidence suggesting that someone has been living in the apartment with him unnoticed. His mental state deteriorates as the lines between reality and paranoia blur. The film builds up to a dramatic and unexpected conclusion where the true identity and motives of the stalker are revealed.

== Cast ==
- Marc Blucas as David Lamont
- Shiri Appleby as Rebecca Fay
- Reiko Aylesworth as Audrey Levine
- John Bedford Lloyd as Detective Soll
- Allison McAtee as Kathy Mahoni
- Derek Cecil as Garret Rankin
- Roberta Maxwell as Ms. Alimet
- Jeffrey Carlson as Jared Thurber
- Joel Leffert as Goodman
- Andrew Weems as Bobby

== Release ==
The World Premiere for The Killing Floor was at 9:30 P.M., April 14, 2007 at the Malibu Film Festival. The Region 1 DVD rights have been acquired by THINKFilm with a direct-to-DVD release of January 8, 2008.

The film was released on DVD in Sweden by Noble Entertainment on March 14, 2007. The release date for the UK was May 21, 2007.
