= Unearth (film) =

2020 American horror film

- Promotional release poster
- Directed by: John C. Lyons; Dorota Swies
- Written by: Kelsey Goldberg; John C. Lyons
- Starring: Adrienne Barbeau; P. J. Marshall; Allison McAtee; Rachel McKeon; Monica Wyche; Brooke Sorenson; Marc Blucas
- Cinematography: Eun-ah Lee
- Edited by: John C. Lyons; Dorota Swies
- Music by: Jane Saunders
- Production company: Lyons Den Productions
- Release dates: August 2020 (Fantasia International Film Festival); April 22, 2021 (United States)
- Running time: 94 minutes
- Country: United States
- Language: English

Unearth is a 2020 American horror film directed and edited by John C. Lyons and Dorota Swies, from a screenplay by Lyons and Kelsey Goldberg. It stars Adrienne Barbeau and Marc Blucas as the respective heads of two neighboring farm families in the rural United States. When one of the families leases their land to a natural gas company, the resulting fracking releases a force that threatens the lives of both families. Alongside Barbeau and Blucas, the film's cast includes P. J. Marshall, Allison McAtee, Rachel McKeon, Monica Wyche, and Brooke Sorenson.

Unearth premiered at the Fantasia International Film Festival in August 2020. It received a theatrical release on Earth Day, April 22, 2021.

== Plot ==
In rural Pennsylvania, two farming families - the Lomacks (father George, daughters, Heather and Kim and grandson Reese, Kim's infant son), and the Dolans (Kathryn, Tom, Aubrey and daughter Christina) - maintain a long-running feud. Both families have fallen on desperate times financially, exacerbating the situation. George Lomack, a single father operating a failing auto repair business, is approached by representatives of Patriot Exploration, a natural gas fracking company with an interest in acquiring drilling rights on his land. Needing to earn money for his two daughters, George accepts the offer. This is to the horror of Dolan matriarch Kathryn, and the tension between the two families escalates further.

Patriot Exploration brings in their equipment and begins operations on the Lomack property, greatly disrupting the lives of the two families. Strange events begin soon thereafter; the members of both families gradually suffer the effects of a strange illness, initially compelling them to obsessively scratch their skin. As their sanity degrades from the illness, George's infant grandson Reese senses something wrong with the tap water and refuses to drink it, but the others do. Other strange events occur, such as the conspicuous absence of wildlife sounds outside the families' homes.

The illness is the result of a fungus unearthed by the fracking, poisoning the air and water. Kathryn goes missing after working in the barn and suffering from a coughing fit, crawling through the woods. Christina and Tom Dolan go looking for her and Tom finds her corpse kneeling at a tree, attached to it by fungal tendrils that emerged from her body. While Tom looks at her in horror, a sac on one of the tendrils explodes, covering Tom in a substance. Kim finds Reese dead in his crib, his body reduced to a gelatinous mass after his skin was digested by the fungus. Kim is shot by Tom's wife Aubrey under the influence of the fungus. Heather kills Aubrey with a baseball bat as she is attacking George. George drives Kim to a neighbor's house for help; Heather stays behind to check on the Lomacks. George attacks and presumably kills the neighbor while hallucinating and seeing his own face.

While Christina and Heather are in the Lomacks' kitchen, Tom returns and Christina, hallucinating that he has the same tendrils as Kathryn growing from his body, shoots and kills him. Heather and Christina leave and go to the tree house in the woods and pass out. Christina, still hallucinating, thinks Heather has changed and sees blood running down her legs. She makes her way to her truck and finds a rifle, firing it into the empty woods. She then drives into the corn fields before getting the truck stuck and passes out. The sounds of wildlife suddenly return, seemingly implying the crisis has ended.

Some time later, Christina has taken over the farm, as Kathryn had hoped she would. As she works, she scratches her arm, suggesting she may still be infected by the fungus. During the credits, the farm's corn is shipped to a bayside city, while it is indicated that the farm's drainage basin flows into the ocean.

== Cast ==
- Adrienne Barbeau as Kathryn Dolan
- Marc Blucas as George Lomack
- Brooke Sorenson as Kim Lomack
- Allison McAtee as Christina Dolan
- Rachel McKeon as Heather Lomack
- P.J. Marshall as Tom Dolan
- Monica Wyche as Aubrey Dolan

== Production ==
Unearth was filmed in northwestern Pennsylvania.

== Themes ==
Co-director Dorota Swies stated that the film is "not just about fracking but how, in general, we take the goods of nature for granted. Greed and ignorance have already destroyed our water supplies with chemicals, biological or radiological waste." Co-director John C. Lyons added:

American farmers have been squeezed harder by our trade wars, and now the [COVID-19] pandemic, with crops left rotting in the field when already, over the past decade, their income was down and suicides up. No one is safe from the wrecking ball that is corporate greed. When we destroy our precious water resources, it will eventually affect us in our food and drink. That's the point that I hope comes across in the film. You may think this is a fictional story about a couple of remote farm families, but environmental injustice eventually affects us all.

Adrienne Barbeau said that the larger issues in the film were her attraction to the material.

It's not just your everyday slasher film where six people get killed in the first three minutes of the film and you don't have any idea who they are and why you should even care if they're dead. I was attracted to the social statement it's making about several things. Not just if you come down on the side of fracking or anti-fracking. It presents a very balanced picture of people making choices because they have to in order to survive. Unearth really explains the reasons behind the choices.

== Release ==
Unearth premiered at the Fantasia International Film Festival in August 2020. The film's international distribution rights were acquired by Reel Suspects that year. Cinedigm acquired the rights for the film in the U.S. and Canada, and released the film at Laemmle Theatres in North Hollywood, Los Angeles, California, on April 20, 2021. It received a wider theatrical release on Earth Day, April 22, 2021. It also screened at the Sunset Drive-in in Waterford, Pennsylvania on April 29, 2021.

On August 22, 2022, the film screened as part of the "Messaging the Monstrous: Eco Horror" program at the Museum of Modern Art (MoMA) in New York, followed by a Q&A with Barbeau, Lyons and Swies.

=== Home media ===
The film was released on Blu-ray on April 19, 2022.

== Reception ==
=== Critical response ===
On Rotten Tomatoes, Unearth has an approval rating of 71% based on 17 reviews, with an average rating of 6.1/10.

Rachel Reeves of Rue Morgue wrote "Fueled by timely societal and economic anxieties, strong performances and a convincingly genuine understanding of the subject matter, Unearth is a worthy slow-burn look at real-world terrors through a unique horror-tinted lens." Jenn Adams, writer for Consequence, said "Unearth is a timely metaphor in the midst of a pandemic which has crippled the US economy." Jim Hemphill, profiled the film's directors, John C. Lyons and Dorota Swies, for Filmmaker Magazine and praised their efforts stating "together they've crafted one of the best films of 2020 in any genre." In her four out of five star review, Zofia Wijaszka, for FirstShowing.net said "Next to powerful storytelling that relates directly to our modern world of damaging technology and bloody outcomes, there's well-crafted characters that we want to believe in. If you want to see a horror story that talks about the power of nature and showcases human relationships, this film delivers exactly that."

Nick Allen, writing for RogerEbert.com, though praising the film's make-up effects, wrote that it "turns into a gnarly soap opera, and moments of shocking violence are met with an eye-roll instead of the shock that comes from winding up an audience." He added: "it bungles even its thesis statement [...] That the movie can't even make its argument effectively is a death knell, and indicative of how misconceived it is with such a compelling concept." Drew Tinnin of Dread Central gave the film a score of three out of five stars, commending the performances of Barbeau and Blucas as "the two posts in the ground that humanize this story even when the fantastical elements start to sprout", but writing that the film's "directors may have had two different visions that may have conflicted with each other."

=== Accolades ===
Unearth writers, John C. Lyons and Kelsey Goldberg, were awarded Best Screenplay at the Isla Calavera Festival de Cine Fantástico "for transmitting a brilliant mixture between an ecological message in deep America and a desperate economic situation." Unearth was awarded the ReFrame Project's stamp of distinction for being a gender-balanced production.

== See also ==
- List of eco-horror films
