= Studio One (nightclub) =

LGBTQ nightclub in West Hollywood, California

Coordinates: 34.082671°N 118.385907°W

Studio One, formerly known as The Factory, was a LGBT nightclub in West Hollywood, California.

== History ==
The Studio One building was originally owned by William Fox and housed the Mitchell Camera Company. Mitchell manufactured Hollywood's early film cameras used by Charlie Chaplin, and for filming The Wizard of Oz (1939). Later, it was used as the Norden bombsight facility during World War II. In 1968, the building was bought and transformed into The Factory nightclub, named after the furniture manufacturing business in the lower floor of the building. The Factory became a popular 1960s-style discothèque that was frequented by Hollywood celebrities, but it only lasted a few years. Studio One was founded on the same site in 1974 by part-owner Scott Forbes, a Boston optometrist. In the 1990s, it was bought by Sandy Sachs and renamed to Axis. The space is currently called The Robertson.

Throughout its history, the club has been associated with the gay rights movement. Many celebrities graced the club either as guests or performers, especially during the late 1970s and most of the 1980s. Photos of those people were displayed in the hallway between the disco and cabaret. The club also had entertainers Sammy Davis Jr., Peter Lawford and Paul Newman on its board of directors.

== Notable performers ==
- Wayland Flowers
- Madeline Kahn
- Bernadette Peters
- Chita Rivera
- Joan Rivers
- Ike & Tina Turner

== See also ==
- Studio One Forever, documentary film
