= UpStairs Lounge arson attack =

1973 arson attack on a gay bar in New Orleans

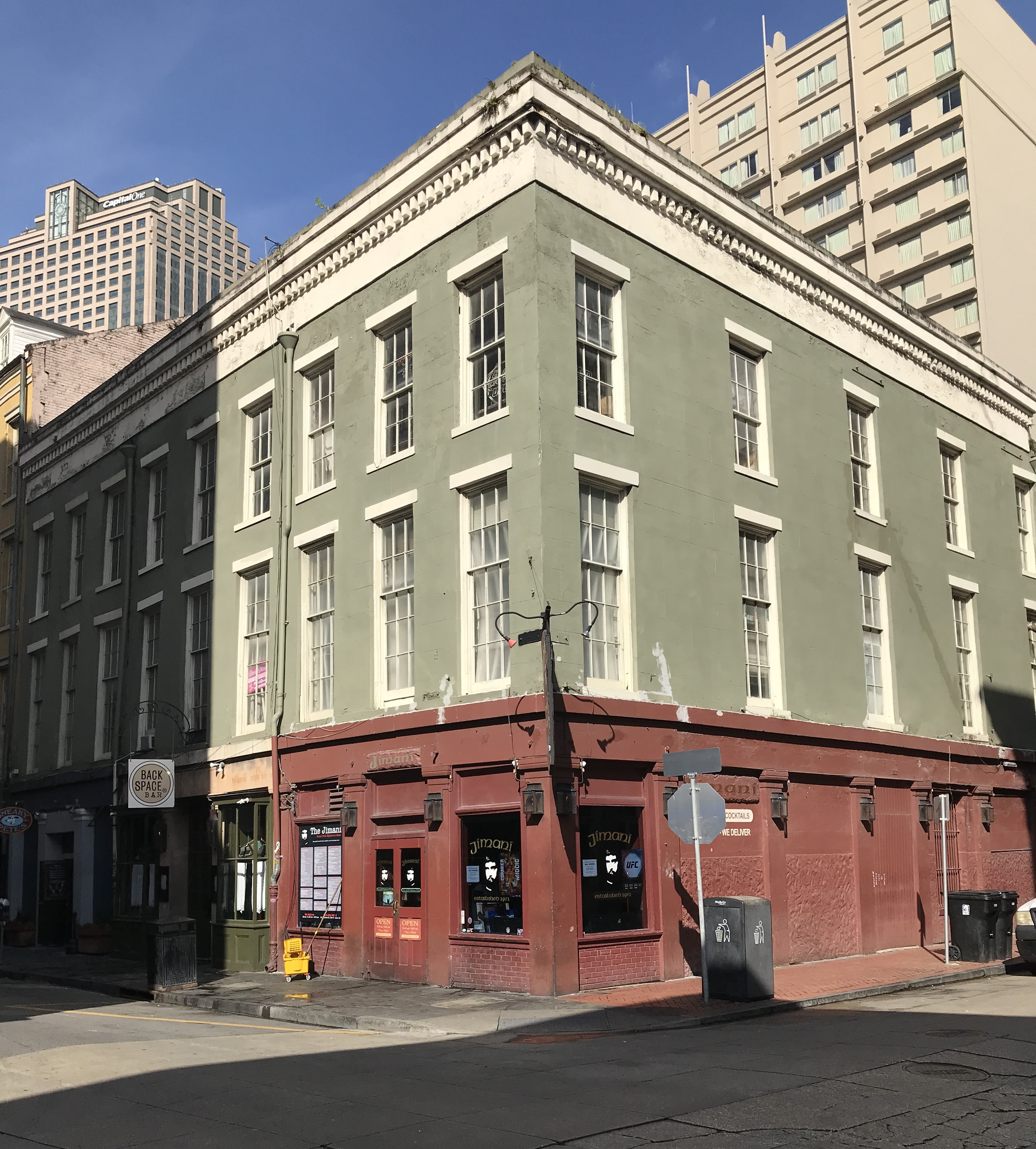
- Site of the UpStairs Lounge, 2019
- Location: 29.9535°N 90.0675°W; 604 Iberville Street, New Orleans, Louisiana, U.S.
- Date: June 24, 1973; 7:56 – 8:12 p.m. (CDT)
- Attack type: Arson, mass murder, violence against LGBT people
- Deaths: 32
- Injuries: 15
- Motive: Unknown
- Accused: Roger Dale Nunez

On June 24, 1973, an arson attack occurred at the UpStairs (or Up Stairs) Lounge, a gay bar on the 2nd floor of 604 Iberville Street in New Orleans, Louisiana, United States. 32 people died and 15 were injured as a result of fire or smoke inhalation. The official cause is still listed as "undetermined origin". The primary suspect, a gay man with a history of psychiatric impairment named Roger Dale Nunez who had been ejected from the bar earlier in the day, was never charged and died by suicide in November 1974.

Until the 2016 Pulse nightclub shooting, in which 49 people were killed, the UpStairs Lounge arson attack was the deadliest attack against LGBTQ people in US history.

== Background ==
The club was located on the 2nd floor of a 3-story building at the corner of Chartres and Iberville Streets. Members of the Metropolitan Community Church, a pro-LGBT Protestant denomination, were there after service. The MCC was the United States' first national gay Christian fellowship, founded in Los Angeles in 1968; the local congregation had held services in the UpStairs Lounge's theatre for a while.

The fire was the third arson attack to affect the MCC, following a January 27, 1973, arson at the church's headquarters in Los Angeles (resulting in the destruction and collapse of the building with no injuries) and another 1973 arson at an MCC church in Nashville, Tennessee (also with complete destruction of the church and its furnishings but no injuries).

== Incident ==
On June 24, 1973, the regular "beer bust" drink special attracted its usual blue-collar gay crowd to the UpStairs Lounge. That night's beer bust, from 5 to 7 pm, attracted approximately 110 patrons. After the drink special ended, about 60 to 90 patrons remained; they listened to pianist George Steven "Bud" Matyi perform and discussed an upcoming MCC fundraiser for the local Crippled Children's Hospital.

At 7:56 pm, a buzzer from downstairs sounded, and bartender Buddy Rasmussen asked Luther Boggs to answer the door, anticipating a taxi cab driver. Boggs opened the door to find the front staircase engulfed in flames, along with the smell of lighter fluid. Rasmussen immediately led some twenty patrons out of the back exit to the roof, where the group could access a neighboring building's roof and climb down to the ground floor. The others were accidentally locked inside the second-floor club, some attempting to escape by squeezing through barred windows. One man managed to squeeze through the 14-inch gap, only to fall to his death while burning. Reverend Bill Larson of the MCC clung to the bars of one window until he died, and his charred remains were visible to onlookers for hours afterwards. Boggs died 16 days later on July 10, from 3rd-degree burns to 50% of his body.

Firefighters stationed two blocks away found themselves blocked by cars and pedestrian traffic. One fire truck tried to maneuver on the sidewalk but crashed into a taxi. They arrived to find bar patrons struggling against the security bars and quickly brought the fire under control.

== Victims ==
List of fatalities

- Joseph Henry Adams
- Reginald E. Adams
- Guy D. Andersen
- Joe William Bailey
- Luther Boggs
- Louis Horace Broussard
- Herbert Dean Cooley
- Donald Walter Dunbar
- Adam Roland Fontenot
- Larry Norman Frost
- David Stuart Gary
- Horace "Skip" Getchell
- John Thomas Golding, Sr.
- Gerald Hoyt Gordon
- Glenn Richard "Dick" Green
- James Wall Hambrick
- Kenneth Paul Harrington
- Rev. William R. Larson
- Ferris LeBlanc
- Robert "Bob" Lumpkin
- Leon Richard Maples
- George Steven "Bud" Matyi
- Clarence Joseph McCloskey, Jr.
- Duane George "Mitch" Mitchell
- Larry Stratton
- Eddie Hosea Warren
- James Curtis Warren
- Willie Inez Warren
- Dr. Perry Lane Waters, Jr.
- Douglas Maxwell Williams
- Unidentified White Male
- Unidentified White Male

— Source:

Twenty-eight people died at the scene of the 16-minute fire, and one died en route to the hospital. Another 18 suffered injuries, of whom three, including Boggs, died.

=== Funerals and memorial services ===
Many churches refused to hold funerals for the dead. Reverend William P. Richardson of St. George's Episcopal Church agreed to hold a small prayer service for the victims on June 25. Approximately 80 people attended the event. The next day, Iveson B. Noland, the Episcopal bishop of the Diocese of Louisiana, rebuked Richardson for hosting the service. Noland received more than 100 complaints from parishioners concerning the service, and Richardson's mailbox filled with hate mail.

Soon after two additional memorial services were held on July 1 at a Unitarian church and St. Mark's United Methodist Church, headed by Louisiana's Methodist bishop Finis Crutchfield and led by MCC founder Reverend Troy Perry, who came from Los Angeles to participate. Mourners exited through the church's main door rather than an available side exit, a demonstration of a new willingness to be identified on camera. Several families did not step forward to claim the bodies of the deceased. A few anonymous individuals stepped forward and paid for the three unknown men's burials, and they were buried with another victim identified as Ferris LeBlanc in a mass grave. LeBlanc's family would not learn of his death in the arson attack until January 2015. It was initially believed that LeBlanc and the unknown victims were buried at Holt Cemetery, but this proved to be false. LeBlanc's family eventually discovered that they were all buried at Resthaven Cemetery. In 2018, Robert L. Camina, director of the UpStairs Inferno documentary, announced in The Advocate that, after extensive research, one of the three unknown victims could finally be identified as 32-year-old Larry Norman Frost. This announcement and its underlying research received a negative peer review in The Advocate from fellow UpStairs Lounge scholars Clayton Delery and Robert Fieseler. These scholars pointed to a lack of forensic evidence, the omission of historic materials contradicting Camina's case and the absence of comment from the coroner as reason for Frost to remain "a possible Up Stairs Lounge victim or even a probable one with an asterisk."

In June 1998, the 25th anniversary of the fire, as part of Gay Pride celebrations, a memorial service was organized by Rev. Dexter Brecht of Big Easy Metropolitan Community Church (also known as Vieux Carre MCC) and Toni J. P. Pizanie. It was held at the Royal Sonesta Hotel Grand Ball Room and attended by New Orleans Councilman Troy Carter, Rev. Carole Cotton Winn, Senior Rabbi Edward Paul Cohn of Temple Sinai, Rev. Kay Thomas from Grace Fellowship in Christ Jesus, Rev. Perry, and 32 members of the New Orleans community representing the victims. Carter then led a jazz funeral procession to the building on the corner of Chartres and Iberville Streets, the site of the club, and members of the local MCC laid a memorial plaque and wreaths at the grave. Among the attendees was the niece of victim Clarence McCloskey.

== Investigation ==
The official investigation failed to yield any convictions. The only suspect in the attack was Roger Dale Nunez, who had been ejected from the bar earlier in the evening after fighting with another customer. Police attempted to question Nunez shortly after, but he was hospitalized with a broken jaw and could not respond. When questioned later, police records show, he did not appear nervous. Nunez had a witness who claimed that he had been in and out of the bar during the 10–20 minutes before the fire, and that he had seen nobody enter or leave the building. Because police observed that the witness was stressed, they dismissed the witness as a liar.

Nunez was diagnosed with "conversion hysteria" in 1970 and visited numerous psychiatric clinics. He was released from a treatment facility in the year before the fire. After his arrest, Nunez escaped from psychiatric custody and was never picked up again by police, despite frequent appearances in the French Quarter. A friend later told investigators that Nunez confessed on at least four occasions to starting the fire. He told the friend he squirted the bottom steps with Ronsonol lighter fluid, bought at a local Walgreens, and tossed a match. He did not realize, he claimed, that the whole place would go up in flames. Nunez died by suicide in November 1974.

In 1980, the state fire marshal's office, lacking leads, closed the case.

== Aftermath ==
The space on the second floor formerly known as the UpStairs Lounge now contains business offices and a kitchen for the Jimani Lounge (established 1971), which is located on the first floor. The current owner, Jimmy Massacci, and his father, the former owner, personally witnessed the fire and its aftermath. The third floor, then owned by the UpStairs Lounge, remains unused and partially damaged. The building itself dates back to at least 1848, when the earliest-known sale of the building is documented.

== Legacy ==
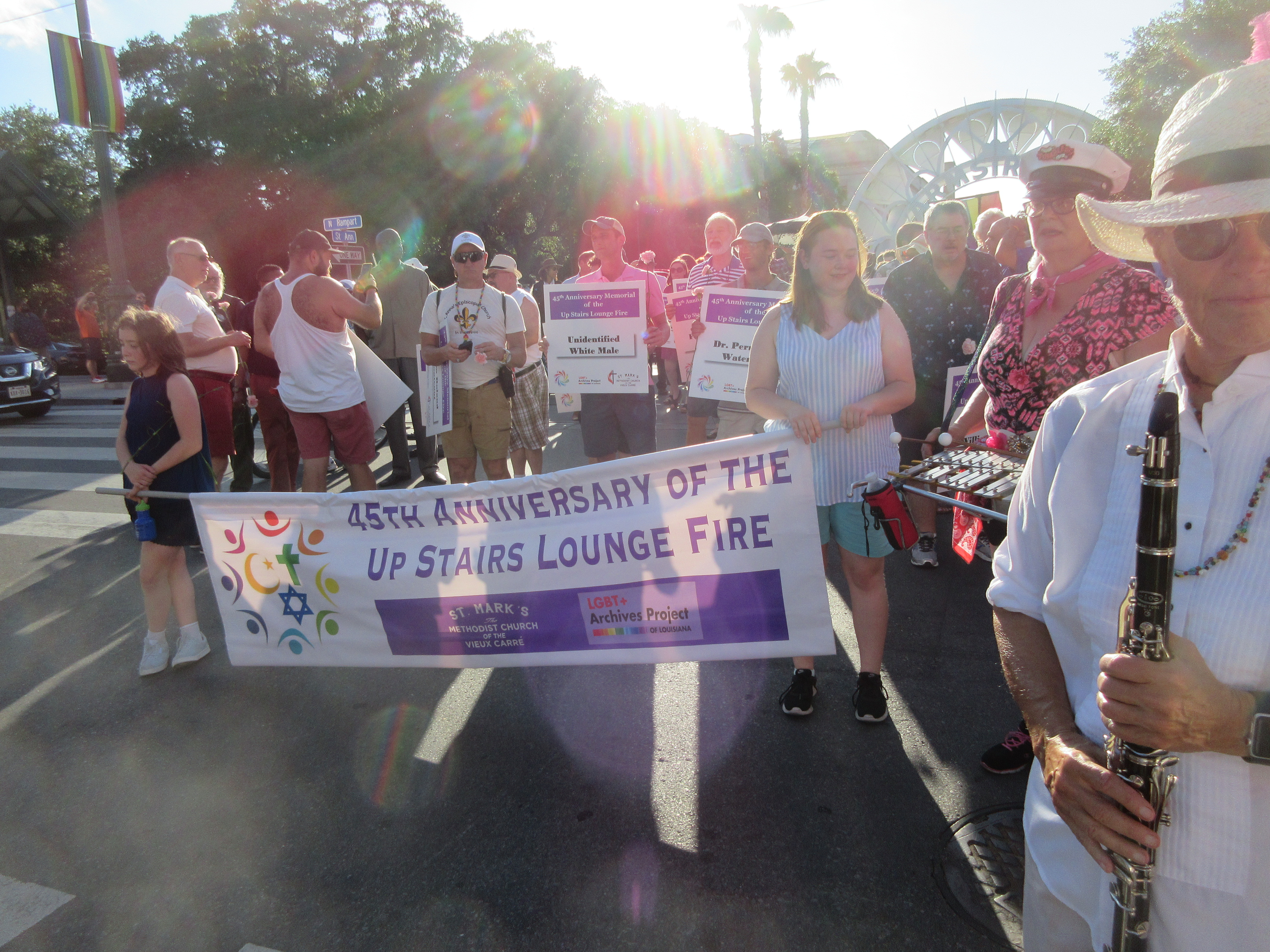
The 45th Anniversary Memorial Procession in New Orleans

In 1998, the reconstituted MCC congregation in New Orleans (Big Easy Metropolitan Community Church, since renamed again to MCC of New Orleans) held a 25th anniversary service to commemorate the arson and its 32 deaths. This event is significant because, unlike the one it memorialized, the 300 members of the congregation refused to hide their faces and instead insisted on entering and leaving the event through the church's front doors.

In 2003, a memorial plaque was placed in the sidewalk on the site of the fire; in 2019 it was refurbished. In April 2024, the plaque was stolen. In June 2025, on the eve of the 52nd anniversary of the fire, the plaque was replaced.

In 2008, The North American Convocation of Pro-LGBT Christians planned to hold its "Many Stories, One Voice" event in New Orleans to commemorate the 25th anniversary of the conference (and the 35th anniversary of the tragedy), but eventually canceled the conference for the year due to Hurricane Gustav. In 2008, local artist Skylar Fein constructed an art installation titled Remember the Upstairs Lounge. The New Orleans Museum of Art has since acquired Fein's art exhibit, which includes a reproduction of the bar.

In 2013, noting the 40th anniversary of the fire, the Archbishop of New Orleans, Gregory Michael Aymond, issued a statement of regret that his predecessor, Archbishop Philip Hannan, and the local church leadership ignored the arson attack. Aymond wrote to Time magazine that "In retrospect, if we did not release a statement we should have to be in solidarity with the victims and their families ... The church does not condone violence and hatred. If we did not extend our care and condolences, I deeply apologize."

== Depiction in media ==
Coverage of the fire by news outlets minimized the fact that LGBT patrons constituted the majority of the victims, while editorials and talk radio hosts made light of the event. No government officials or major religious figures made mention of the fire for several days, if not weeks. After returning from a trip in Europe, New Orleans Mayor Moon Landrieu held a routine press conference on July 11, 1973, where a gay reporter questioned him about the "homosexual angle" to the tragedy affecting community response. Landrieu stated that he was "not aware of any lack of concern in the community." New Orleans Archbishop Philip Hannan, silent for weeks, offered brief remarks at the end of a column about human rights in the archdiocesan newspaper The Clarion Herald in mid-July 1973. As Robert L. Camina, writer/director of a documentary about the fire (Upstairs Inferno), said in 2013, "I was shocked at the disproportionate reaction by the city government. The city declared days of mourning for victims of other mass tragedies in the city. It shocked me that despite the magnitude of the fire, it was largely ignored."

=== Film and television ===
In 2013, Royd Anderson wrote, directed, and produced the first film (a documentary) about the tragedy titled The UpStairs Lounge Fire.

In 2015, Upstairs Inferno, a feature-length documentary written, directed, and produced by Robert L. Camina, had its World Premiere in New Orleans at the historic Prytania Theatre. The film's narration was provided by best selling author Christopher Rice (son of novelist Anne Rice). Upstairs Inferno was invited to screen at the Library of Congress on February 16, 2017.

In 2018, the national ABC News investigative unit released a documentary entitled Prejudice & Pride: Fire at the UpStairs Lounge. The documentary won the Al Neuharth Award for Innovation in Investigative Journalism from the National Lesbian and Gay Journalists Association (NLGJA) and was a finalist for the Mosaic Award from The Deadline Club.

A TAPS group in episode 15, Season 8 of Ghost Hunters visited the lounge to encounter alleged ghosts of the fire's casualties. The episode identified the event as the "Jimani Lounge Massacre."

=== Theater ===
Also in 2013, Wayne Self (a playwright and composer from Natchitoches, Louisiana), first presented a musical called Upstairs about the tragedy. In 2014, Melange Dance Company of New Orleans performed a tribute show as part of the New Orleans Fringe Festival. 'The UpStairs Lounge' show aimed to uplift with a combination of dance and film that celebrate the Lounge, its patrons, and the strides taken towards Human Rights since the incident. In 2015, Melange Dance Company of New Orleans presented an extended performance of 'The UpStairs Lounge' show originally performed as part of the 2014 New Orleans Fringe Festival. In 2017, an Off-Broadway musical called The View UpStairs about The UpStairs Lounge opened at The Lynn Redgrave Theater in New York City.

=== Books ===
In 2014, McFarland & Company released Clayton Delery-Edwards' account of the arson, The Up Stairs Lounge Arson: Thirty-Two Deaths in a New Orleans Gay Bar, June 24, 1973. The book was selected as one of the Louisiana Endowment for the Humanities 2015 Books of the Year. In 2018, Liveright Publishing released historian Robert W. Fieseler's debut book Tinderbox: The Untold Story of the Up Stairs Lounge Fire and the Rise of Gay Liberation, which received multiple prizes including the Edgar Award from the Mystery Writers of America and the Louisiana Literary Award from the Louisiana Library Association. For his research, Fieseler was named the 2019 National Lesbian and Gay Journalists Association (NLGJA) "Journalist of the Year.” In 2019, The New York Times featured Bill Larson, a victim of the UpStairs Lounge arson attack, in their obituary feature Overlooked. On June 14, 2021, the book The Mayor of Oak Street, written by Vincent Traughber Meis, was published by NineStar Press. It is dedicated to the victims of the UpStairs Lounge arson attack. In 2021, Casey McQuiston published One Last Stop, which features the UpStairs Lounge arson attack. Elizabeth Dias and Jim Downs published an article, "The Horror Upstairs", in Time magazine, July 1, 2013.

== See also ==
- Colorado Springs nightclub shooting (2022), a similar attack which targeted a LGBTQ nightclub
- Killing of Fernando Rios, a 1958 gay bashing incident in New Orleans
- Otherside Lounge bombing
- Pulse nightclub shooting
