= Bloomington (film) =

- DVD cover
- Directed by: Fernanda Cardoso
- Written by: Fernanda Cardoso
- Produced by: Jason Shumway
- Starring: Allison McAtee; Sarah Stouffer; Katherine Ann McGregor; Erika Heidewald; Ray Zupp
- Music by: Jermaine Stegall
- Release date: June 23, 2010 (Frameline)
- Running time: 83 minutes
- Country: United States
- Language: English

Bloomington is a 2010 independent coming-of-age drama film about a former child actress (Sarah Stouffer) attending college in search of independence. She becomes romantically involved with a professor, played by Allison McAtee. A chance for the younger woman to return to acting confronts them with major decisions.

Bloomington was written and directed by Fernanda Cardoso and filmed in Indianapolis, Indiana and Los Angeles, California. The film received mixed reviews.

== Plot summary ==
Jackie Kirk, a former child actress, catches the eye of Lesbian teacher Catherine Stark (McAtee), while attending college in Bloomington, Indiana. Jackie attempts to fit in with her fellow students, who are in awe of her acting background.

After meeting at an on-campus mixer, Catherine and Jackie begin a secret and necessarily scandalous affair that draws Jackie away from college social life. Catherine and Jackie grow closer as they help each other discover more about themselves. When suddenly Jackie gets the chance to return to acting, Catherine becomes uncomfortable with their situation; she believes they would always have to hide the truth of their relationship.

Catherine tries to distance herself from Jackie, saying they were never in a formal relationship. She tries to discount Jackie as worth the risk, while Jackie claims Catherine is worth it.

At odds with her friends, Jackie gets into a fight with Sandy (Erika Heidewald), who is resentful of Jackie competing for a scholarship she doesn't need and believes that Jackie's affair with a teacher is getting her preferential treatment. Jackie slaps Sandy, who punches her in the face.

The next day Jackie shows up at Catherine's doorstep with a black eye. Catherine sees paparazzi taking pictures and quickly brings the younger woman into the house. She notices Catherine is wearing a dress and questions her. Catherine says she is going to a party but won't reveal her date. Jackie offends Catherine, by saying that she can't support herself.

Jackie stays on the couch at Catherine's house. When Catherine returns from the party, she takes her male date into her bedroom, and Jackie leaves.

She goes to a party where she can hang with her own friends and also flirts with a male friend, Zach (Ray Zupp). After Jackie leaves for L.A. to film an updated movie based on her former series, her relationship with Catherine is partially revealed. The teacher loses her job.

Months later, Jackie and Catherine are shown sleeping together one last time. They say goodbye as a formal end to their romance, and Jackie returns the next day to California and her new role.

== Cast ==
- Allison McAtee as Catherine Stark
- Sarah Stouffer as Jacqueline "Jackie" Kirk
- Katherine Ann McGregor as Lillian
- Erika Heidewald as Sandy
- Ray Zupp as Zach
- J. Blakemore as Wade
- Chelsea Marie Rogers as Rachel
- Patrick Mullen as Phil
- Don Becker as Professor S. Hecht
- John Dreher as Tommy
- Jim Dougherty as Professor Newberry
- Ana Liza Platt as Resident Assistant
- Roger Ortman as Bill Whitten
- Nicky Warner as Laura
- Seth Cheek as Teaching Assistant
- Joshua Ramsey as Catherine's Date
- Jason Smither as Interviewing Reporter
- Kayla Gill as Female Reporter
- Steven Gray as Step-father
- Jeff Angel as Uncle Keith
- Karen Shumway as Aunt
- Kamden Roberts as Pete
- Beverly Ann Roche as Female Relative
- Beck Engle as Cousin
- Derek W. Tow as Math Teacher
- Jason Shumway as Director at Audition
- Maggie Shumway as Ethan
- Gary Shumway as Photographer
- Megan Martz as Library Attendant
- Craig Dukate as English Teacher
- Jonny Dumser as TJ

== Reception ==
Lesbian media site After Ellen called Bloomington a "sexy and offbeat" and "fantastic little drama." The review notes that "Compared to other teacher-student romances that we’ve seen on the lesbian screen, including Mädchen in Uniform and the more recent Loving Annabelle, this is far more above-board," meaning that Jackie is a legal adult.

Queer website Autostraddle complains that by the end of the movie "nothing’s resolved and the Pandora’s box of issues that was opened in this relationship hasn’t been acknowledged by either party", adding that the action takes place "in a world where subtlety is not a concept that exists".

== Awards ==
- Best Women's Feature—North Carolina Gay & Lesbian Film Festival
- Director's Spotlight—Vancouver Queer Film Festival
- Best Director—Indianapolis LGBT Film Festival
- Opening Night Feature—Barcelona Gay & Lesbian Film Festival
- Centerpiece Gala Selection—Reelout Queer Film + Video Festival

== See also ==
- Loving Annabelle (2006)
- List of LGBT films directed by women
