= St. Paul's United Methodist Church (Houston) =

Church in Houston, Texas, United States

Coordinates: 29.7261°N 95.3886°W

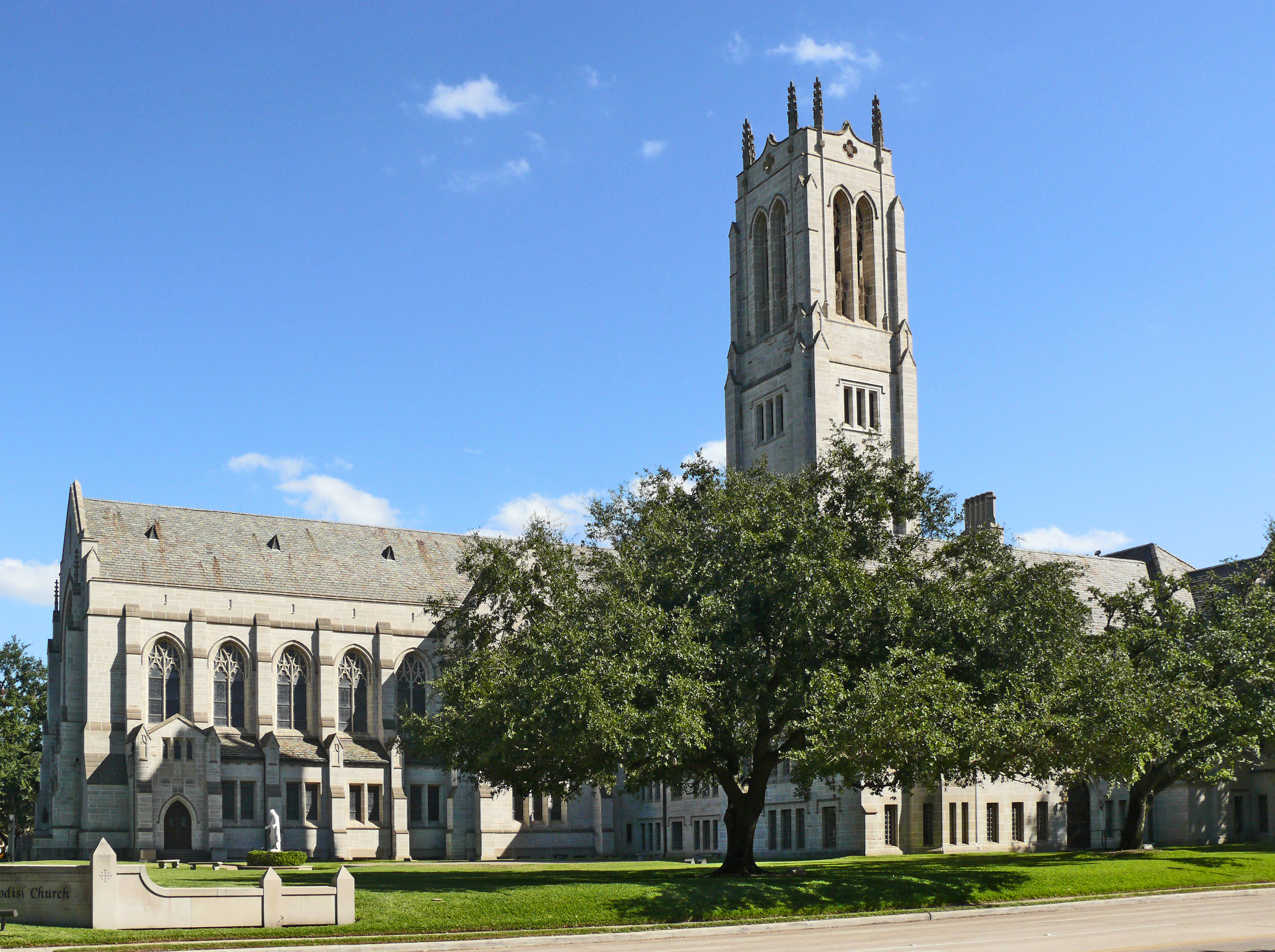
St. Paul's United Methodist Church from the corner of Binz and Main

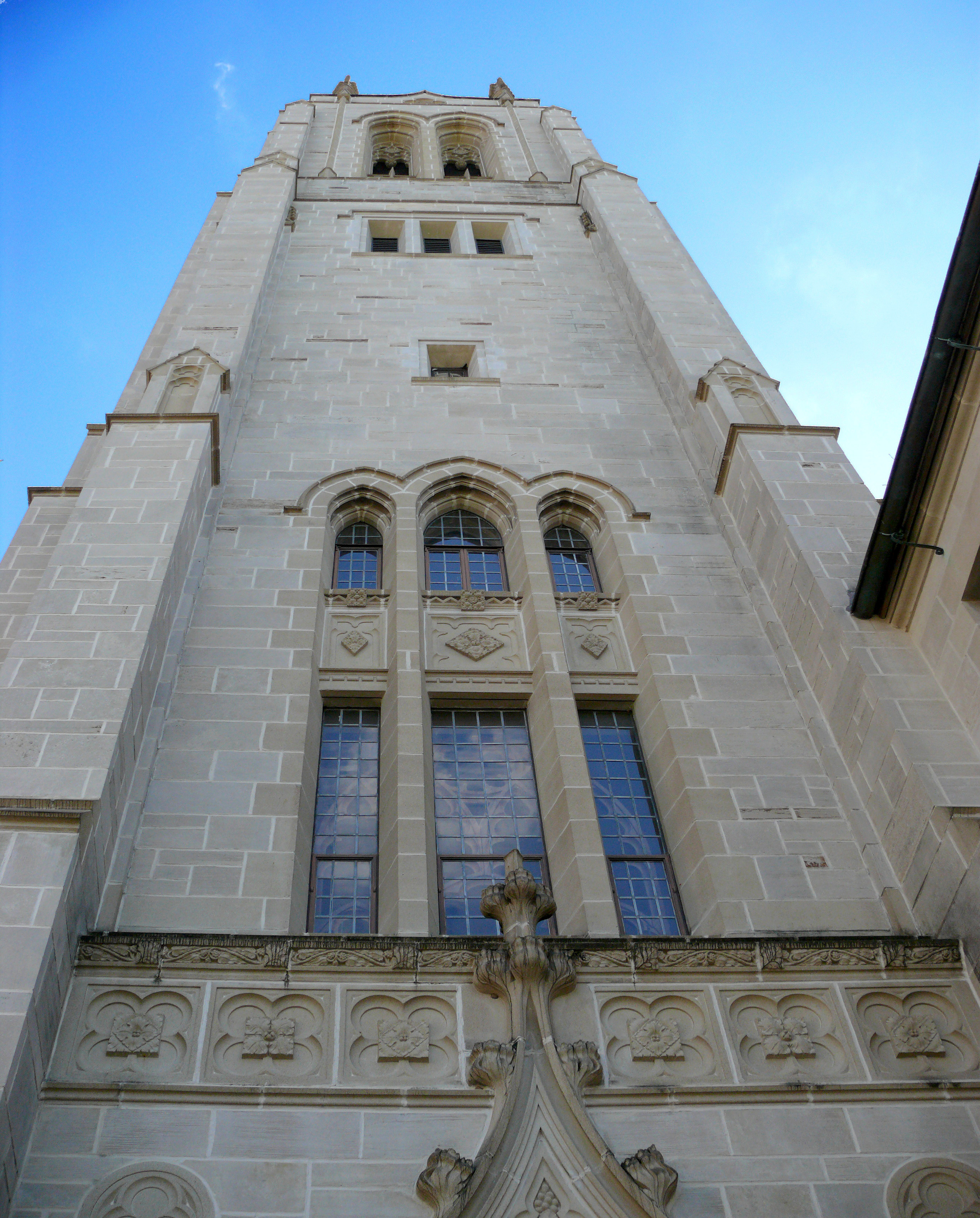
St Paul's United Methodist Church Tower

St. Paul's United Methodist Church is a congregation of the United Methodist Church, founded in 1906 and located in Houston, Texas, in the city's Museum District. St. Paul's is known for its traditional style of worship as embodied by its choir.

== History ==
At the beginning of the 20th century, members of Houston’s Methodist community worked toward organizing a new congregation on what was then the burgeoning south end of town. In December 1905, individuals met at the J.O. Ross family home and held Christmas Eve services at the city auditorium. The congregation officially organized on January 14, 1906, with 153 charter members. Bishop Joseph Key preached the first sermon and suggested the congregation adopt St. Paul’s as its name. The Ross family gave lots at the corner of Milam and McGowen streets for a new building. The church building was designed by R.D. Steele and consecrated in January 1909. The structure reflected a Grecian design with a dome reminiscent of Byzantine architecture.

The church grew along with the city of Houston, and in the late 1920s, members launched a campaign to raise money for new and larger facilities. Jesse H. Jones, Walter Fondren Sr., and James Marion West Sr. each contributed $150,000, and the church hired noted architect Alfred C. Finn to design a new building at the corner of Main and Binz streets. The Neo-Gothic styling features a cruciform plan on a steel-frame structure with limestone cladding. Stained glass windows are from the original structure, and the tower houses bells also brought from the church’s original sanctuary. It has been described as "one of Houston's grandest houses of worship."

In 1954, the church started a Mothers' Day Out program serving very young children up to age 3. St. Paul's School was launched in 1973 to serve 3 and 4 year olds and a kindergarten program was added in 1982. St. Paul's School is currently accredited by the National Association for the Education of Young Children (NAEYC) and was the first in the city to be accredited by NAEYC. In 2024, St. Paul's School celebrated its 70th anniversary and held a gala in its honor.

The Bankston Green, dedicated in September 2014 in honor of retired pastor Jim Bankston and his wife Sandy, is a plaza on church property adjoining the city's Museum Walk. It includes wider sidewalks, green areas, enhanced seating and lighting, and a pavement labyrinth. The project has been given the Landmark Award by the Mayor’s Proud Partners program of Keep Houston Beautiful.

== Beliefs ==
=== Marriage ===
The church has an inclusive vision and celebrates both opposite-sex marriages and same-sex marriages.

== Programs ==
St. Paul's is known for a strong emphasis on social justice issues and radical hospitality. For example, an advocacy group called Texas Health Care For All advocates for the creation of a single payer health care system in the United States. The Rev. Dr. Jim Bankston, who served as pastor from 1995 until his retirement in June 2013, was an outspoken advocate for immigration reform.

== Clergy ==
The current senior minister of St. Paul's is The Rev. Dr. Jeff McDonald.
