= Upstairs Inferno =

2015 American documentary film

- Directed by: Robert L. Camina
- Produced by: John C. Pafford; Robert L. Camina
- Narrated by: Christopher Rice
- Cinematography: Nick Morr
- Edited by: Robert L. Camina
- Music by: Michael Austin; Stoyan Ganev
- Production company: Camina Entertainment
- Release dates: August 22, 2015 (North Carolina Gay & Lesbian Film Festival); February 27, 2018 (Blu-ray)
- Running time: 96 minutes
- Country: United States
- Language: English

Upstairs Inferno is a 2015 American documentary film written, produced, and directed by Robert L. Camina. It chronicles the events surrounding the UpStairs Lounge arson attack on June 24, 1973, in New Orleans, Louisiana and the city's response to the tragedy.

It had its festival premiere as the closing night film at the North Carolina Gay & Lesbian Film Festival on August 22, 2015.

== Synopsis ==
The film takes an investigative approach to unpacking and retelling the unsolved crime of the UpStairs Lounge arson attack which was, until the Pulse nightclub shooting on June 12, 2016, the largest mass murder of LGBTQ people in the history of the United States. The story is told through a mix of archival footage and interviews with survivors, eyewitnesses, and city officials past and present. It emphasizes the lack of media response to the attack at the time and the district attorney's failure to investigate despite a recommendation from the Louisiana state fire marshal to do so. The film is narrated by author Christopher Rice.

== Impact ==
At the time of production, there were several victims of the 32 killed that remained unidentified or their whereabouts unknown. In 2015, the film's production and publicity led the family of Ferris LeBlanc to finally learn the tragic fate of their kin through a simple Google search of his name. A niece of a previously unnamed victim, Larry Norman Frost, came forward to claim her uncle as one of the unidentified, reaching-out to the filmmakers who altered the final cut to include a tribute to Frost after cross-referencing the claim.

Upstairs Inferno was invited to screen at the Library of Congress on February 16, 2017.

== Critical reception ==
The film won multiple awards in its festival run and was met with mixed but generally positive reviews from critics.

The Arkansas Times called it "a heartbreaking portrait of sustained grief". While The Texas Observer was more tepid in proclaiming "Upstairs Inferno is not stylistically innovative" but "a worthy effort".

== Awards ==
Year	Award	Category	Nominee	Result
2017	Manhattan Film Festival	Film Heals Award	Robert L. Camina	Won
2016	Kansas International Film Festival	Best Documentary Film	Robert L. Camina	Nominated
2015	Seattle Queer Film Festival	Best Documentary Film	Robert L. Camina	Won
2015	Long Beach QFilm Festival	Best Documentary Feature	Robert L. Camina	Won
2015	North Carolina Gay & Lesbian Film Festival	Best Men's Feature	Robert L. Camina	Won
2015	North Carolina Gay & Lesbian Film Festival	Best Men's Documentary	Robert L. Camina	Won
