= List of awards and nominations received by Buffy the Vampire Slayer and Angel =

List of awards and nominations for Buffy the Vampire Slayer
Awards and nominations
Award	Wins	Nominations
AFI Awards	0	1
Bram Stoker Awards	0	1
Cinema Audio Society Awards	1	1
GLAAD Media Awards	0	2
Golden Globe Awards	0	1
Golden Reel Awards	1	9
Hugo Awards	1	3
International Horror Guild Awards	1	4
Kids' Choice Awards	1	7
Make-Up Artists and Hair Stylists Guild Awards	2	8
Nebula Awards	0	2
Primetime Emmy Awards	2	14
Rondo Hatton Classic Horror Awards	1	2
Satellite Awards	1	10
Saturn Awards	9	33
TCA Awards	1	6
Teen Choice Awards	5	21
TV Guide Awards	0	3
Q Awards	1	2
Visual Effects Society Awards	1	1
Young Artist Awards	1	3

Totals (Note: Certain award groups do not simply award one winner. They acknowledge several different recipients, have runners-up, and have third place. Since this is a specific recognition and is different from losing an award, runner-up mentions are considered wins in this award tally. For simplification and to avoid errors, each award in this list has been presumed to have had a prior nomination.)
- Wins: 29
- Nominations: 134

This article lists awards and nominations received by the American supernatural drama television series Buffy the Vampire Slayer and its spinoff, Angel.

== Awards and nominations for Buffy the Vampire Slayer ==
Accolades received by Buffy the Vampire Slayer
Award	Year (Note: The listed year refers to the date of the ceremony, not necessarily the year in which the corresponding season or episode aired.)	Category	Nominee(s)	Result	Ref.
AFI Awards	2002	Drama Series of the Year	Buffy the Vampire Slayer	Nominated	
Bram Stoker Awards	2000	Best Screenplay	Joss Whedon (for "Hush")	Nominated	
Cinema Audio Society Awards	1999	Outstanding Achievement in Sound Mixing for Television – Series	Kevin Patrick Burns, Todd Orr, Ron Evans, David Yaffe (for "Lovers Walk")	Won	
GLAAD Media Awards	2001	Outstanding Drama Series	Buffy the Vampire Slayer	Nominated	
GLAAD Media Awards	2002	Outstanding Drama Series	Buffy the Vampire Slayer	Nominated	
Golden Globe Awards	2001	Best Performance by an Actress in a Television Series – Drama	Sarah Michelle Gellar	Nominated	
Golden Reel Awards	1998	Best Sound Editing – Television Episodic – Music	Fernand Bos, Celia Weiner	Nominated	
Golden Reel Awards	1999	Best Sound Editing – Television Episodic – Dialogue & ADR		Nominated	
Golden Reel Awards	1999	Best Sound Editing – Television Episodic – Music	Fernand Bos	Nominated	
Golden Reel Awards	2000	Best Sound Editing – Television Episodic – Dialogue & ADR	Cindy Rabideau, Daniel Tripoli, Anna MacKenzie, Raymond E. Spiess III, Mike Marchain, Mark Cleary, Robert Guastini (for "Beer Bad")	Nominated	
Golden Reel Awards	2000	Best Sound Editing – Television Episodic – Music	Fernand Bos (for "The Prom")	Nominated	
Golden Reel Awards	2001	Best Sound Editing - Television Episodic - Effects & Foley	Cindy Rabideau, Mike Marchain, Mark Cleary, Daniel Tripoli, Raymond E. Spiess III (for "Fool for Love")	Nominated	
Golden Reel Awards	2001	Best Sound Editing – Television Episodic – Music	Fernand Bos (for "Superstar")	Nominated	
Golden Reel Awards	2002	Best Sound Editing in Television - Effects & Foley, Episodic	Cindy Rabideau, Mark Cleary, Raymond E. Spiess III, Robert Guastini, Daniel Tripoli (for "The Gift")	Nominated	
Golden Reel Awards	2002	Best Sound Editing in Television – Music, Episodic Live Action	Fernand Bos, Tim Isle (for "Once More, With Feeling")	Won	
Hugo Awards	2002	Best Dramatic Presentation	Joss Whedon (for "Once More, With Feeling")	Nominated	
Hugo Awards	2003	Best Dramatic Presentation – Short Form	Nick Marck, Jane Espenson, Drew Goddard (for "Conversations with Dead People")	Won	
Hugo Awards	2004	Best Dramatic Presentation – Short Form	Joss Whedon (for "Chosen")	Nominated	
International Horror Guild Awards	1999	Best Television	Buffy the Vampire Slayer	Won	
International Horror Guild Awards	2000	Best Television	Buffy the Vampire Slayer	Nominated	
International Horror Guild Awards	2001	Best Television	Buffy the Vampire Slayer	Nominated	
International Horror Guild Awards	2003	Best Television	Buffy the Vampire Slayer	Nominated	
Kids' Choice Awards	1999	Favorite TV Show	Buffy the Vampire Slayer	Nominated	
Kids' Choice Awards	1999	Favorite TV Actress	Sarah Michelle Gellar	Nominated	
Kids' Choice Awards	2000	Favorite TV Friends	Sarah Michelle Gellar, David Boreanaz	Nominated	
Kids' Choice Awards	2001	Favorite TV Actress	Sarah Michelle Gellar	Nominated	
Kids' Choice Awards	2002	Favorite TV Show	Buffy the Vampire Slayer	Nominated	
Kids' Choice Awards	2002	Favorite Female Butt Kicker	Sarah Michelle Gellar	Won	
Kids' Choice Awards	2003	Favorite Female Butt Kicker	Sarah Michelle Gellar	Nominated	
Make-Up Artists and Hair Stylists Guild Awards	1999	Best Special Effects Makeup – Television (for a Single Episode of a Regular Series – Sitcom, Drama or Daytime)	Todd McIntosh, Robin Beauchesne, Douglas Noe, Kenny Myers, Brigette A. Myre (for "Living Conditions")	Won	
Make-Up Artists and Hair Stylists Guild Awards	2000	Best Contemporary Makeup – Television (for a Single Episode of a Regular Series – Sitcom, Drama or Daytime)	Todd McIntosh, Brigette A. Myre, Robin Beauchesne, David DeLeon, Kate Biscoe (for "Restless")	Nominated	
Make-Up Artists and Hair Stylists Guild Awards	2000	Best Contemporary Hair Styling – Television (for a Single Episode of a Regular Series – Sitcom, Drama or Daytime)	Michael Moore, Lisa Marie Alpert, Gloria Pasqua-Casny (for "Restless")	Nominated	
Make-Up Artists and Hair Stylists Guild Awards	2000	Best Period Hair Styling – Television (for a Single Episode of a Regular Series – Sitcom, Drama or Daytime)	Michael Moore, Lisa Marie Alpert, Gloria Pasqua-Casny (for "Fool for Love")	Nominated	
Make-Up Artists and Hair Stylists Guild Awards	2000	Best Special Effects Makeup – Television (for a Single Episode of a Regular Series – Sitcom, Drama or Daytime)	Todd McIntosh, Robin Beauchesne, Douglas Noe, Brigette A. Myre, Jay Wejebe (for "New Moon Rising")	Nominated	
Make-Up Artists and Hair Stylists Guild Awards	2002	Best Special Effects Makeup – Television (for a Single Episode of a Regular Series – Sitcom, Drama or Daytime)	Todd McIntosh, Jay Wejebe, Veronica Lorenz, Brigette A. Myre (for "Bargaining")	Nominated	
Make-Up Artists and Hair Stylists Guild Awards	2003	Best Period Hair Styling – Television Series	Sean Flanigan, Francine Shermaine, Lisa Marie Alpert	Nominated	
Make-Up Artists and Hair Stylists Guild Awards	2003	Best Special Makeup Effects – Television Series	Peter Montagna, Brigette A. Myre, Carol Schwartz	Won	
Nebula Awards	2002	Best Script	Joss Whedon (for "The Body")	Nominated	
Nebula Awards	2003	Best Script	Joss Whedon (for "Once More, With Feeling")	Nominated	
Primetime Emmy Awards	2000	Outstanding Writing for a Drama Series	Joss Whedon (for "Hush")	Nominated	
Primetime Creative Arts Emmy Awards	1997	Outstanding Makeup for a Series	Todd McIntosh, John Vulich, John Maldonado, John Wheaton (for "Welcome to the Hellmouth")	Nominated	
Primetime Creative Arts Emmy Awards	1998	Outstanding Hairstyling for a Series	Jeri Baker, Francine Shermaine, Suzan Bagdadi, Susan Carol Schwary, Dugg Kirkpatrick (for "Becoming")	Nominated	
Primetime Creative Arts Emmy Awards	1998	Outstanding Makeup for a Series	Todd McIntosh, John Vulich, John Maldonado, John Wheaton, Gerald Quist, Margie Kaklamanos, Dayne Johnson, Alan Friedman, Craig Reardon, Michael F. Blake, Robin Beauchesne, Brigette A. Myre, Mark Shostrom (for "Surprise" and "Innocence")	Won	
Primetime Creative Arts Emmy Awards	1998	Outstanding Music Composition for a Series (Dramatic Underscore)	Christophe Beck (for "Becoming")	Won	
Primetime Creative Arts Emmy Awards	1999	Outstanding Makeup for a Series	Todd McIntosh, John Wheaton, Robin Beauchesne, Douglas Noe, Jamie Kelman, Craig Reardon, John Vulich, John Maldonado, Brigette A. Myre, Ed French, Blake Shepard, Erwin H. Kupitz (for "The Zeppo")	Nominated	
Primetime Creative Arts Emmy Awards	1999	Outstanding Sound Editing for a Series	Cindy Rabideau, Robert Guastini, Mark Cleary, Mike Marchain, Anna MacKenzie, William H. Angarola, Rick Hinson, Ray Spiess, Fernand Bos, Zane D. Bruce, Joseph T. Sabella (for "Lovers Walk")	Nominated	
Primetime Creative Arts Emmy Awards	2000	Outstanding Cinematography for a Single-Camera Series	Michael Gershman (for "Hush")	Nominated	
Primetime Creative Arts Emmy Awards	2000	Outstanding Hairstyling for a Series	Michael Moore, Lisa Marie Alpert, Gloria Pasqua-Casny, Loretta Jody Miller (for "Beer Bad")	Nominated	
Primetime Creative Arts Emmy Awards	2002	Outstanding Hairstyling for a Series	Sean Flanigan, Lisa Marie Alpert, Francine Shermaine, Thomas Real, Linda Arnold (for Hell's Bells)	Nominated	
Primetime Creative Arts Emmy Awards	2002	Outstanding Makeup for a Series (Non-Prosthetic)	Todd McIntosh, Jay Wejebe, Carol Schwartz, Brigette A. Myre (for "Hell's Bells")	Nominated	
Primetime Creative Arts Emmy Awards	2002	Outstanding Makeup for a Series (Prosthetic)	Todd McIntosh, Jay Wejebe, Carol Schwartz, Brigette A. Myre, Joel Harlow, John Vulich (for "Hell's Bells")	Nominated	
Primetime Creative Arts Emmy Awards	2002	Outstanding Music Direction	Christophe Beck, Jesse Tobias (for "Once More, With Feeling")	Nominated	
Primetime Creative Arts Emmy Awards	2003	Outstanding Special Visual Effects for a Series	Loni Peristere, Patricia Gannon, Ron Thornton, Chris Zapara, Rick Baumgartner, Chris John Jones, Michael D. Leone, David Funston, Kevin Quattro (for "Chosen")	Nominated	
Q Awards	2000	Best Actress in a Quality Drama Series	Sarah Michelle Gellar	Nominated	
Q Awards	2001	Founder's Award		Won	
Rondo Hatton Classic Horror Awards	2002	TV Presentation of the Year	Buffy the Vampire Slayer	Won	
Rondo Hatton Classic Horror Awards	2003	TV Presentation of the Year	Buffy the Vampire Slayer	Nominated	
Satellite Awards	2002	Outstanding Television Ensemble	Buffy the Vampire Slayer	Won	
Satellite Awards	2003	Best Television Series, Drama	Buffy the Vampire Slayer	Nominated	
Satellite Awards	2003	Best Actress in a Series, Drama	Sarah Michelle Gellar	Nominated	
Satellite Awards	2003	Best Actor in a Supporting Role in a Series, Drama	James Marsters	Nominated	
Satellite Awards	2003	Best Actress in a Supporting Role in a Series, Drama	Alyson Hannigan	Nominated	
Satellite Awards	2003	Best Actress in a Supporting Role in a Series, Drama	Emma Caulfield	Nominated	
Satellite Awards	2003	Best Overall DVD	Buffy the Vampire Slayer: The Complete Second Season	Nominated	
Satellite Awards	2005	Best Overall DVD	Buffy the Vampire Slayer: The Complete Sixth Season	Nominated	
Satellite Awards	2005	Best DVD Release of TV Shows	Buffy the Vampire Slayer: The Complete Sixth Season	Nominated	
Satellite Awards	2005	Best DVD Extras	Buffy the Vampire Slayer: The Complete Sixth Season (for the commentary)	Nominated	
Saturn Awards	1998	Best Genre Television Series	Buffy the Vampire Slayer	Won	
Saturn Awards	1998	Best Genre Television Actress	Sarah Michelle Gellar	Nominated	
Saturn Awards	1998	Best Genre Television Actor	Nicholas Brendon	Nominated	
Saturn Awards	1999	Best Genre Television Series	Buffy the Vampire Slayer	Nominated	
Saturn Awards	1999	Best Genre Television Actress	Sarah Michelle Gellar	Won	
Saturn Awards	1999	Best Genre Television Actor	Nicholas Brendon	Nominated	
Saturn Awards	2000	Best Network Television Series	Buffy the Vampire Slayer	Nominated	
Saturn Awards	2000	Best Actress on Television	Sarah Michelle Gellar	Nominated	
Saturn Awards	2000	Best Supporting Actor on Television	Nicholas Brendon	Nominated	
Saturn Awards	2000	Best Supporting Actor on Television	James Marsters	Nominated	
Saturn Awards	2001	Best Network Television Series	Buffy the Vampire Slayer	Won	
Saturn Awards	2001	Best Actress on Television	Sarah Michelle Gellar	Nominated	
Saturn Awards	2001	Best Supporting Actor on Television	James Marsters	Won	
Saturn Awards	2001	Best Supporting Actor on Television	Anthony Stewart Head	Nominated	
Saturn Awards	2001	Best Supporting Actress on Television	Alyson Hannigan	Nominated	
Saturn Awards	2001	Best Supporting Actress on Television	Michelle Trachtenberg	Nominated	
Saturn Awards	2002	Best Network Television Series	Buffy the Vampire Slayer	Won	
Saturn Awards	2002	Best Actress on Television	Sarah Michelle Gellar	Nominated	
Saturn Awards	2002	Best Supporting Actor on Television	James Marsters	Nominated	
Saturn Awards	2002	Best Supporting Actress on Television	Alyson Hannigan	Nominated	
Saturn Awards	2002	Best Supporting Actress on Television	Michelle Trachtenberg	Nominated	
Saturn Awards	2002	Cinescape Genre Face of the Future Award – Male	James Marsters	Won	
Saturn Awards	2003	Best Network Television Series	Buffy the Vampire Slayer	Nominated	
Saturn Awards	2003	Best Actress on Television	Sarah Michelle Gellar	Nominated	
Saturn Awards	2003	Best Supporting Actor on Television	James Marsters	Nominated	
Saturn Awards	2003	Best Supporting Actress on Television	Alyson Hannigan	Won	
Saturn Awards	2003	Best Supporting Actress on Television	Michelle Trachtenberg	Nominated	
Saturn Awards	2003	Cinescape Genre Face of the Future Award – Female	Emma Caulfield (Note: Shared with Darkness Falls)	Won	
Saturn Awards	2003	Best DVD TV Programming Release	Buffy the Vampire Slayer (for Seasons 1–2)	Nominated	
Saturn Awards	2004	Best Network Television Series	Buffy the Vampire Slayer	Nominated	
Saturn Awards	2004	Best Actress on Television	Sarah Michelle Gellar	Nominated	
Saturn Awards	2004	Best Supporting Actor on Television	James Marsters (Note: Shared with Angel)	Won	
Saturn Awards	2005	Best DVD TV Programming Release	Buffy the Vampire Slayer (for Seasons 2–3)	Nominated	
TCA Awards	2000	Program of the Year	Buffy the Vampire Slayer	Nominated	
TCA Awards	2000	Outstanding Achievement in Drama	Buffy the Vampire Slayer	Nominated	
TCA Awards	2001	Program of the Year	Buffy the Vampire Slayer	Nominated	
TCA Awards	2001	Outstanding Achievement in Drama	Buffy the Vampire Slayer	Nominated	
TCA Awards	2001	Individual Achievement in Drama	Sarah Michelle Gellar	Nominated	
TCA Awards	2003	Heritage Award		Won	
Teen Choice Awards	1999	TV – Choice Drama	Buffy the Vampire Slayer	Nominated	
Teen Choice Awards	1999	TV – Choice Actress	Sarah Michelle Gellar	Won	
Teen Choice Awards	1999	TV – Choice Actor	David Boreanaz	Nominated	
Teen Choice Awards	2000	TV – Choice Drama	Buffy the Vampire Slayer	Nominated	
Teen Choice Awards	2000	TV – Choice Actress	Sarah Michelle Gellar	Won	
Teen Choice Awards	2000	TV – Choice Actor	Seth Green	Nominated	
Teen Choice Awards	2000	TV – Choice Sidekick	Alyson Hannigan	Nominated	
Teen Choice Awards	2000	TV – Choice Sidekick	James Marsters	Nominated	
Teen Choice Awards	2001	TV – Choice Drama	Buffy the Vampire Slayer	Nominated	
Teen Choice Awards	2001	TV – Choice Actress	Sarah Michelle Gellar	Nominated	
Teen Choice Awards	2001	TV – Choice Sidekick	Alyson Hannigan	Nominated	
Teen Choice Awards	2001	TV – Choice Sidekick	Michelle Trachtenberg	Nominated	
Teen Choice Awards	2002	TV – Choice Drama/Action Adventure	Buffy the Vampire Slayer	Nominated	
Teen Choice Awards	2002	TV – Choice Actress, Drama/Action Adventure	Sarah Michelle Gellar	Won	
Teen Choice Awards	2002	TV – Choice Actor, Drama/Action Adventure	James Marsters	Nominated	
Teen Choice Awards	2002	TV – Choice Sidekick	Alyson Hannigan	Won	
Teen Choice Awards	2003	Choice TV – Drama/Action Adventure	Buffy the Vampire Slayer	Nominated	
Teen Choice Awards	2003	Choice TV Actress – Drama/Action Adventure	Sarah Michelle Gellar	Won	
Teen Choice Awards	2003	Choice TV Actor – Drama/Action Adventure	James Marsters	Nominated	
Teen Choice Awards	2003	Choice TV Sidekick	Alyson Hannigan	Nominated	
Teen Choice Awards	2017	Choice TV Show – Throwback	Buffy the Vampire Slayer	Nominated	
TV Guide Awards	2000	Favorite Sci-Fi/Fantasy Show	Buffy the Vampire Slayer	Nominated	
TV Guide Awards	2000	Favorite Teen Show	Buffy the Vampire Slayer	Nominated	
TV Guide Awards	2001	Supporting Actress of the Year in a Drama Series	Alyson Hannigan	Nominated	
Visual Effects Society Awards	2004	Outstanding Visual Effects in a Television Series	Loni Peristere, Patricia Gannon, Ron Thornton, Chris Zapara (for "Chosen")	Won	
Young Artist Awards	1998	Best Performance in a TV Drama Series – Guest Starring Young Actor	Jeremy Foley	Nominated	
Young Artist Awards	1999	Best Performance in a TV Drama or Comedy Series – Leading Young Actress	Sarah Michelle Gellar	Nominated	
Young Artist Awards	2001	Best Performance in a TV Drama Series – Supporting Young Actress	Michelle Trachtenberg	Won	

=== Notes ===
List of awards and nominations for Angel
Awards and nominations
Award	Wins	Nominations
American Choreography Awards	0	1
Golden Reel Awards	0	3
Hugo Awards	0	3
International Horror Guild Awards	1	3
Make-Up Artists and Hair Stylists Guild Awards	2	5
Primetime Emmy Awards	0	1
Satellite Awards	0	7
Saturn Awards	6	25
Teen Choice Awards	0	2
TV Guide Awards	0	1

Totals (Note: Certain award groups do not simply award one winner. They acknowledge several different recipients, have runners-up, and have third place. Since this is a specific recognition and is different from losing an award, runner-up mentions are considered wins in this award tally. For simplification and to avoid errors, each award in this list has been presumed to have had a prior nomination.)
- Wins: 9
- Nominations: 51

== Awards and nominations for Angel ==
Accolades received by Angel
Award	Year (Note: The listed year refers to the date of the ceremony, not necessarily the year in which the corresponding season or episode aired.)	Category	Nominee(s)	Result	Ref.
American Choreography Awards	2002	Outstanding Achievement in Fight Choreography	Mike Massa (for "A New World")	Nominated	
Golden Reel Awards	2000	Best Sound Editing – Television Episodic – Music	Fernand Bos, Tim Isle (for "I Will Remember You")	Nominated	
Golden Reel Awards	2002	Best Sound Editing in Television – Music, Episodic Live Action	Tim Isle (for "Carpe Noctem")	Nominated	
Golden Reel Awards	2003	Best Sound Editing in Television Episodic – Music	Tim Isle (for "Waiting in the Wings")	Nominated	
Hugo Awards	2003	Best Dramatic Presentation – Short Form	Joss Whedon (for "Waiting in the Wings")	Nominated	
Hugo Awards	2005	Best Dramatic Presentation – Short Form	Ben Edlund, Joss Whedon (for "Smile Time")	Nominated	
Hugo Awards	2005	Best Dramatic Presentation – Short Form	Jeffrey Jackson Bell, Joss Whedon (for "Not Fade Away")	Nominated	
International Horror Guild Awards	2001	Best Television	Angel	Won	
International Horror Guild Awards	2003	Best Television	Angel	Nominated	
International Horror Guild Awards	2004	Best Television	Angel	Nominated	
Make-Up Artists and Hair Stylists Guild Awards	2001	Best Period Hair Styling – Television (for a Single Episode of a Regular Series – Sitcom, Drama or Daytime)	Diana Acrey, Anthony Miner, Patricia Gundlach (for "Darla")	Nominated	
Make-Up Artists and Hair Stylists Guild Awards	2001	Best Period Makeup – Television (for a Single Episode of a Regular Series – Sitcom, Drama or Daytime)	Dayne Johnson, David DeLeon, Dalia Dokter (for "Darla")	Won	
Make-Up Artists and Hair Stylists Guild Awards	2001	Best Special Effects Makeup – Television (for a Single Episode of a Regular Series – Sitcom, Drama or Daytime)	Dayne Johnson, David DeLeon, Stephen Prouty (for "Shroud of Rahmon")	Nominated	
Make-Up Artists and Hair Stylists Guild Awards	2002	Best Period Hair Styling – Television (for a Single Episode of a Regular Series – Sitcom, Drama or Daytime)	Diana Acrey, Gary J. Perticone (for "The Quickening")	Won	
Make-Up Artists and Hair Stylists Guild Awards	2002	Best Period Makeup – Television (for a Single Episode of a Regular Series – Sitcom, Drama or Daytime)	Dayne Johnson, Veronica Lorenz, David DeLeon (for "Offspring")	Nominated	
Primetime Creative Arts Emmy Awards	2000	Outstanding Makeup for a Series	Dayne Johnson, David DeLeon, Louis Lazzara, Steve LaPorte, Rick Stratton, Jill Rockow, Toby Lamm, Jeremy Swan, Stephen Prouty, Earl Ellis, Dalia Dokter, Robert Maverick (for "The Ring")	Nominated	
Satellite Awards	2004	Best Actor in a Series, Drama	David Boreanaz	Nominated	
Satellite Awards	2004	Best Actor in a Supporting Role in a Series, Drama	Andy Hallett	Nominated	
Satellite Awards	2004	Best Actress in a Supporting Role in a Series, Drama	Amy Acker	Nominated	
Satellite Awards	2004	Best Actress in a Supporting Role in a Series, Drama	Gina Torres	Nominated	
Satellite Awards	2005	Best Overall DVD	Angel: The Complete Fourth Season	Nominated	
Satellite Awards	2005	Best DVD Release of TV Shows	Angel: The Complete Fourth Season	Nominated	
Satellite Awards	2005	Best DVD Extras	Angel: The Complete Fourth Season (for the commentary)	Nominated	
Saturn Awards	2000	Best Network Television Series	Angel	Nominated	
Saturn Awards	2000	Best Actor on Television	David Boreanaz	Won	
Saturn Awards	2000	Best Supporting Actress on Television	Charisma Carpenter	Nominated	
Saturn Awards	2001	Best Network Television Series	Angel	Nominated	
Saturn Awards	2001	Best Actor on Television	David Boreanaz	Nominated	
Saturn Awards	2001	Best Actress on Television	Charisma Carpenter	Nominated	
Saturn Awards	2001	Best Supporting Actor on Television	Alexis Denisof	Nominated	
Saturn Awards	2001	Best Supporting Actress on Television	Juliet Landau	Nominated	
Saturn Awards	2002	Best Network Television Series	Angel	Nominated	
Saturn Awards	2002	Best Actor on Television	David Boreanaz	Nominated	
Saturn Awards	2002	Cinescape Genre Face of the Future Award – Female	Amy Acker	Nominated	
Saturn Awards	2003	Best Network Television Series	Angel	Nominated	
Saturn Awards	2003	Best Actor on Television	David Boreanaz	Won	
Saturn Awards	2003	Best Actress on Television	Charisma Carpenter	Nominated	
Saturn Awards	2003	Best Supporting Actor on Television	Alexis Denisof	Nominated	
Saturn Awards	2003	Best Supporting Actress on Television	Amy Acker	Nominated	
Saturn Awards	2004	Best Network Television Series	Angel	Won (Note: Tied with CSI: Crime Scene Investigation)	
Saturn Awards	2004	Best Actor on Television	David Boreanaz	Won	
Saturn Awards	2004	Best Supporting Actor on Television	Alexis Denisof	Nominated	
Saturn Awards	2004	Best Supporting Actor on Television	James Marsters (Note: Shared with Buffy the Vampire Slayer)	Won	
Saturn Awards	2004	Best Supporting Actress on Television	Charisma Carpenter	Nominated	
Saturn Awards	2004	Best Supporting Actress on Television	Amy Acker	Won	
Saturn Awards	2005	Best Network Television Series	Angel	Nominated	
Saturn Awards	2005	Best Supporting Actor on Television	James Marsters	Nominated	
Saturn Awards	2005	Best Supporting Actress on Television	Amy Acker	Nominated	
Teen Choice Awards	2000	TV – Choice Breakout Show	Angel	Nominated	
Teen Choice Awards	2000	TV – Choice Actor	David Boreanaz	Nominated	
TV Guide Awards	2000	Favorite Actor in a New Series	David Boreanaz	Nominated	
