= Lie to Me (Buffy the Vampire Slayer) =

- Buffy the Vampire Slayer episode
- Episode no.: Season 2 Episode 7
- Directed by: Joss Whedon
- Written by: Joss Whedon
- Production code: 5V07
- Original air date: November 3, 1997

Guest appearances
- Robia LaMorte as Jenny Calendar; James Marsters as Spike; Juliet Landau as Drusilla; Jason Behr as Billy "Ford" Fordham; Jarrad Paul as Diego; Julia Lee as Chanterelle; Will Rothhaar as James

Episode chronology
← Previous "Halloween"	Next → "The Dark Age"
- Buffy the Vampire Slayer season 2

"Lie to Me" is the seventh episode of the second season of Buffy the Vampire Slayer. It originally aired on The WB on November 3, 1997.

A classmate from Buffy's previous school in Los Angeles shows up in town with a mysterious desire to meet the town's vampires and their human wannabe groupies.

== Plot ==
In an empty playground at night, Drusilla attempts to coax a young boy into being sired as a vampire until Angel intervenes and sends the boy home. Angel then tries to persuade Drusilla to leave Sunnydale with Spike, warning that this will end badly for everyone; Drusilla refuses, saying it is "just the beginning". Buffy watches the encounter from a rooftop, clearly unsettled.

As Buffy talks with Willow and Xander in the school hallway about the incident the next day, her friend Ford (Billy Fordham), with whom she attended school in Los Angeles, surprises her, explaining that he has transferred to Sunnydale High to finish his senior year. At the Bronze, Ford entertains Willow and Xander with embarrassing stories about Buffy. Buffy introduces Angel to Ford, whom Angel becomes suspicious of. In the alley behind the Bronze, Ford sees Buffy stake a vampire; he reveals that he already knows that she is the Slayer, having found out shortly before she was expelled from their previous school. Angel shows up at Willow's bedroom to ask for help tracking down Ford on the internet. Willow quickly finds that Ford is not actually registered at Sunnydale High.

The next night, Buffy and Ford see two vampires running onto campus. Out of sight of Buffy, Ford holds a stake to a female blonde vampire's heart and threatens to kill her unless she does what he wants. When Buffy finds Ford again he claims to have killed the vampire. Meanwhile, Xander, Willow and Angel visit the Sunset Club, the only address Willow has found for Ford. The young people there, including Chanterelle, romanticize vampires, whom they refer to as "the Lonely Ones," which Angel dislikes.

Buffy goes back to the library and meets Giles and Jenny Calendar. Buffy sees a picture of Drusilla among Giles' research. Giles explains that she was Spike's lover, supposedly killed by an angry mob in Prague, but Buffy tells him that she is still alive and that she saw her with Angel. Soon, the blonde female vampire storms out of Giles' study with a book. Buffy recognizes her as the vampire Ford said he had killed. Ford approaches a reluctant Spike and asks to be made a vampire, offering to give them the Slayer in return.

Later that night, Angel comes to Buffy's house to tell her about Ford's club. As Buffy is upset that her friends went behind her back to find out about Ford, she professes her love for Angel but says she does not know if she can trust him, and asks him to tell her the truth about Drusilla. Angel admits to a stunned Buffy that he had been obsessed with Drusilla, once a sweet young woman, and tortured her and killed her family until he sired her; turning her into an insane demon.

Buffy goes to the Sunset Club where Ford explains that he was counting on Buffy figuring out his plan. Buffy pleads with him to let the other club members go. Ford tells her that he has brain cancer with only six months to live; becoming a vampire is the only way he can avoid death. He then admits to her that the other people will not be changed. Though Buffy is sympathetic to his plight, she points out that it still does not justify his actions.

Within minutes of sunset, the vampires arrive and immediately begin feeding. Ford attacks Buffy, but she knocks him out. Buffy overpowers Drusilla and threatens to stake her. Spike immediately orders the vampires to stop feeding. Buffy demands that they let everyone go, which Spike agrees to. The former vampire worshippers flee and Buffy follows. Ford is still unconscious on the floor as Buffy closes the door, locking all the vampires inside with him. Ford awakens and, since he held up his end of the bargain by luring the Slayer, demands that Spike holds up his end of the bargain and sire him. Shrugging off this latest defeat, Spike does so.

A few nights later, Buffy and Giles watch over Ford's grave. Ford's vampire self emerges and Buffy stakes her former friend, before wondering sadly if life for her as a Slayer will ever get easier; she implores Giles, "Lie to me."

== Continuity ==
=== Arc significance ===
The book that Ford helps the vampires steal, by allowing one of them to escape in exchange for a meeting with Spike, is the encrypted manuscript associated with the "du Lac Cross," the key to the code, which plays an important role in "What's My Line."

== Themes ==
Billie Doux disentangles the episode's title: "It isn't just Ford lying to Buffy; Angel also lies to Buffy about Drusilla, and he talks Willow into lying to Buffy about researching Ford." Similarly, Mark Oshiro notes that "there’s not a single character in 'Lie To Me' that doesn’t tell a lie, and it’s one of the more clever attributes of this episode. They range from smaller lies (Giles’s opinion on monster truck racing) to the whoppers that threaten lives (Ford’s plan for his vampire-devotee friends)."

Myles McNutt writes that the episode demonstrates that "the show will not shy away from some dark conclusions for the sake of trying to force this series into definitions of good and evil which fail to take into account the show's inherent liminality":

[I]n an episode that’s all about playing with expectations (Buffy seeing Angel’s meeting with Drusilla as him being unfaithful, the Lonely Ones discovering that pop culture has not exactly depicted vampire culture accurately), Whedon pulls the rug out from under us: Ford isn’t evil so much as he is misguided, driven to his reckless path by terminal brain cancer rather than some sort of evil spirit. It’s a starkly human image of corruption, and that scene with Ford and Buffy in the club discussing the ethics of it all is just really well handled. Ford mapped out his entire story as if it were a movie, from the cheesy lines he shares with Spike (in another great scene) or in his expectation that Buffy will completely understand and perhaps even accept his plan once she learns of his condition. ... The truth could set you free, certainly, but chances are that it's just going to confirm how complicated life really is, especially on a Hellmouth."

Roger Pocock writes, "The saddest example of the 'sheep' who follow Ford is Chanterelle, who is a very naïve girl and comes across as somebody who is desperately searching for something. If she is a sheep, then she is a lost one. She's an example of a vulnerable person turning to some kind of organised spiritualism for help, and being betrayed and exploited. The real world might not have vampires, but there's still a lot of truth in this representation of a cult, with its perversion of religious language. I need them to bless me."

== Reception ==
"Lie to Me" had an audience of 3.4 million households on its original airing.

Vox, ranking it at #28 of all 144 episodes on their "Worst to Best" list, writes, "In this episode, Buffy proves that it can be fantastic even when it's not working to advance the major season-long plots. 'Lie to Me' is the first of the great one-offs, beginning the tradition that would eventually lead to formal experiments like 'Hush' and 'Once More With Feeling.' Of course, this early on in the show, nothing quite so avant-garde is happening. Instead, 'Lie to Me' is just a beautifully executed version of a standard episode of Buffy the Vampire Slayer, with Roswell's Jason Behr offering a nuanced performance as Ford, Buffy's morally ambiguous old friend. And the last scene, with Giles sweetly lying to Buffy about the simplicity of life, is a lovely, poignant moment that captures one of the themes of season two: Growing up is about realizing the bad guys are sometimes people you love."

Paste Magazine, in a similar list, ranked it at #52, saying it "has one of the more ominous cold opens of the series" and "speaks to mortality and the age-old wisdom of 'Be careful what you wish for.' It's also a sharp look into friendship..." Rolling Stone ranked it at #14 on their own list.

== Notes ==
1.Xander: "We usually call them the nasty pointy bitey ones." Chanterelle: "So many people have that misconception. But they who walk with the night are not interested in harming anyone. They're separate from humanity, and must carry the burden of immortality. They are creatures above us. Exalted." Angel: "You're a fool."
2.Ford says, "I've got something to offer you. I'm pretty sure this is the part where you take out a watch and say I've got thirty seconds to convince you not to kill me? It's traditional." Spike snarls, "Well, I don't go much for tradition." Ford says, "It's no fun if you don't say it." Spike rolls his eyes: "You've got thirty seconds to convince me not to kill you." When Ford says he wants to be a vampire, Spike answers, "I've known you for two minutes and I can't stand you. I don't really feature you living forever."
