= Buffy the Vampire Slayer (Boom! Studios) =

US comic book series

Publication information
- Publisher: Boom! Studios
- Schedule: Monthly
- Format: Limited series
- Genre: Horror
- Publication date: January 2019
- No. of issues: 27
- Main character: Scooby Gang

Creative team
- Created by: Joss Whedon
- Written by: Jordie Bellaire
- Penciller: Dan Mora

Buffy the Vampire Slayer is a comic book series published by Boom! Studios. It is a reboot of the television series Buffy the Vampire Slayer created by Joss Whedon, and thus sets in a different canon from the television series and film. The series is written by Jordie Bellaire and primarily illustrated by Dan Mora.

== Plot ==
High school student Buffy Summers has recently moved to the small town of Sunnydale, California with her mother Joyce and Joyce's doctor boyfriend Eric. Secretly, Buffy is in fact a Vampire Slayer, chosen to battle supernatural forces of evil, and undergoes training by her Watcher and school librarian Rupert Giles. Three weeks after arriving in Sunnydale, Buffy accidentally blows her cover saving Willow Rosenberg and Xander Harris from a vampire outside Tunaverse, the fast food restaurant where she works part-time. Giles is disappointed in her lack of discretion, but Willow and Xander prove to be reliable allies when they aid Buffy in battle against the new vampires in town, Spike and his Mistress Drusilla.

In their own time, Willow runs for school president with support from her girlfriend Rose and Xander blogs about his loneliness and insecurities under the pseudonym @theXeppo. Their classmates at Sunnydale High include Cordelia Chase, Willow's excessively friendly competition for school president who meets Spike when he helps recover her campaign balloons, and the athletic Robin Wood, who strikes up a flirtatious relationship with Buffy. Meanwhile, the centuries-old Anya runs a local occult shop, remaining neutral in the battle between good and evil but attracting attention from Drusilla.

== Development ==
Instead of continuing the narrative from where Dark Horse left off, Boom! Studios reboots the series entirely. Executive editor Jeanine Schaefer explained that this decision was made because the existing Buffyverse was such a "richly developed" narrative already. According to Schaefer, "Dark Horse did such a great job with the book [...] and they were really able to not only explore every corner of the Buffy universe, but also took her so far as a person and took her relationships so far. So as we were thinking about it, it feels really closed. It feels like they brought her to such a great point." Instead, Boom! Studios intended to reimagine Buffy for modern day readers, believing that the themes and character arcs of the original series were still relevant to young people in 2019. Schaefer elaborated, "The world right now is scarier than it's ever been; placing these characters firmly in 2019, we can use the themes that were so integral to the show -- identity, agency, and empathy -- to examine our world and the heroes and monsters that lurk inside all of us...and punch those monsters right in the face."

The series has drawn comparison to the Ultimate Marvel comic book imprint, which reimagined decades-old Marvel Comics superheroes for modern audiences in the 21st century.

== Publication ==
=== Single issues ===
Title	Issue #	Release date
"Welcome Back to the Hellmouth, Part One"	1	January 23, 2019
Writer: Jordie Bellaire		Penciller: Dan Mora
Buffy is a teenage Vampire Slayer who has recently moved to Sunnydale with her mother Joyce. She becomes friends with Xander and Willow after saving them from a vampire, earning disapproval from her Watcher Giles. Meanwhile, the vampire Drusilla arrives at Anya's occult shop.
"Welcome Back to the Hellmouth, Part Two"	2	February 27, 2019
Writer: Jordie Bellaire		Penciller: Dan Mora
Buffy meets her classmates Cordelia and Robin for the first time. Cordelia encounters Spike lurking outside the high school and Anya tricks Drusilla into releasing the bat-like creature Camazotz.
"Welcome Back to the Hellmouth, Part Three"	3	March 13, 2019
Writer: Jordie Bellaire		Penciller: Dan Mora
Camazotz flies across Sunnydale causing havoc; Spike and Cordelia work together to subdue him and Buffy learns that the creature is in fact a protector of the Slayer. Spike and Drusilla attack Buffy but are repelled with help from Willow, Xander, and Giles.
"Welcome Back to the Hellmouth, Part Four"	4	April 17, 2019
Writer: Jordie Bellaire		Penciller: Dan Mora
Buffy bonds with her mother's boyfriend Eric and Willow organizes a date between Buffy and Robin. Having stolen Buffy's phone, Spike and Drusilla catfish a lonely Xander into meeting them alone. Preying on his feelings of rejection and isolation, Drusilla bites Xander while Angel looks on.

== Hellmouth ==
"Hellmouth" is a 2019–2020 comic book event published by Boom! Studios. The event is a crossover between Buffy the Vampire Slayer and Angel.

As the Hellmouth threatens Sunnydale to the brink of extinction, Buffy Summers must join forces with the vampire Angel to save the city, as long as they do not kill each other.

=== Checklist ===
Title / Issues	Writer(s)	Artist	Colorist
Buffy the Vampire Slayer: Hellmouth #1–5	Jordie Bellaire, Jeremy Lambert	Eleonora Carlini	Chris Peter
Buffy the Vampire Slayer #8–12	Jordie Bellaire	David López	Raúl Angulo
Angel #5–8	Bryan Edward Hill	Gleb Melnikov	Roman Titov
