= Buffy the Vampire Slayer season 2 =

Buffy the Vampire Slayer
- Season 2
- Region 1 Season 2 DVD cover
- Showrunner: Joss Whedon
- Starring: Sarah Michelle Gellar; Nicholas Brendon; Alyson Hannigan; Charisma Carpenter; David Boreanaz; Anthony Stewart Head
- No. of episodes: 22

Release
- Original network: The WB
- Original release: September 15, 1997 – May 19, 1998

Season chronology
- ← Previous; Season 1 Next → Season 3

The second season of the television series Buffy the Vampire Slayer premiered on September 15, 1997, on The WB and concluded its 22-episode season on May 19, 1998. The first 13 episodes aired on Mondays at 9:00 pm ET, beginning with episode 14 the series moved to Tuesdays at 8:00 pm ET, a timeslot the series would occupy for the rest of its run.

New vampires Spike and Drusilla come to town along with the new slayer, Kendra Young, who was activated as a result of Buffy's brief death in the season one finale. Xander becomes involved with Cordelia, while Willow becomes involved with witchcraft and Daniel "Oz" Osbourne, who becomes a werewolf after being bitten by a young cousin who (he later learns) has the same condition. Buffy and the vampire Angel develop a relationship over the course of the season, but Angel's dark past as the evil and sadistic Angelus threatens to destroy Buffy and the world.

== Plot ==
Buffy Summers (Sarah Michelle Gellar) returns from a summer in Los Angeles after her death at the end of the first season. After distancing herself from her friends and loved ones with her new, self-centered attitude that almost gets them killed, Buffy comes to terms with the traumatic events that transpired and crushes the bones of the Master (Mark Metcalf) once and for all, much to the annoyance of The Anointed One (Andrew J. Ferchland). A few weeks later two new vampires come to town—Spike (James Marsters) and a weakened Drusilla (Juliet Landau)—who intend to use the blood of Drusilla's sire, Buffy's new boyfriend and ensouled vampire Angel (David Boreanaz), to restore her to full health when the time is right. Impatient with the ritualistic attitude of the Order of Aurelius, Spike kills the Anointed One and becomes the more informal leader of Sunnydale's vampire society.

Meanwhile, love is in the air for the members of the Scooby Gang as Buffy and Angel fall deeply in love, Xander Harris (Nicholas Brendon) and Cordelia Chase (Charisma Carpenter) begin an unlikely relationship, Willow Rosenberg (Alyson Hannigan) finds romance in the form of guitarist Daniel "Oz" Osbourne (Seth Green) and even Rupert Giles (Anthony Stewart Head) begins to further his relationship with computer science teacher turned techno-pagan Jenny Calendar (Robia LaMorte). Although after a visit by Giles' long lost friend Ethan Rayne (Robin Sachs) and the return of a powerful demon they used to worship in their youth, Jenny distances herself from Giles because she fears the dangerous life he leads. In "What's My Line" the time has come for Drusilla's ritual. Angel is captured by Spike after he summons a horde of bounty hunters called the Order of Taraka to attempt to eliminate Buffy. Meanwhile, a new Slayer shows up in town, Kendra (Bianca Lawson), who appears to be of Caribbean origin, sent to Sunnydale by her Watcher under the pretense of a very dark power rising up at the Hellmouth. Buffy and Kendra are forced to work together in order to rescue Angel and stop Spike's plan. Although they do save Angel's life and stop the Order, Drusilla is still returned to full strength while Spike is seriously injured by Buffy's assault. Kendra returns to her home as Buffy reaches a new appreciation for her destiny as a slayer.

During Buffy's 17th birthday, Drusilla and Spike resurrect a powerful demon called "The Judge" (Brian Thompson) who can burn the humanity out of people and who claims to be invincible. After Buffy and Angel escape from his attack, the two finally consummate their relationship which brings Angel "a moment of perfect happiness" and ends up costing him his soul. Buffy wakes up in Angel's bed the following morning alone and frets about his disappearance. Later she returns to his apartment where he torments her about giving up her virginity to him. Buffy is left emotionally devastated and suffers further betrayal after she learns that Jenny Calendar is of Romani origin and was sent to Sunnydale in order to prevent Angel from losing his soul, a mission in which she failed. Angel, now Angelus, joins forces with Spike and Drusilla as they intend to use the Judge to wipe humanity off the Earth. The Scooby Gang show up to stop them and Buffy uses a rocket launcher to kill the Judge and halt the vampire's plan. She then fights one on one with Angelus for the first time but cannot kill him. Instead she forcibly kicks him in the testicles and leaves. Meanwhile, Willow finds out about Xander and Cordelia's relationship and falls out with Xander as a result, while Giles' relationship with Jenny is shattered due to her betrayal.

Over the next few months, Buffy readies herself for the day when she will finally have to slay Angelus and Jenny mends her relationship with Giles. She figures out the incantation needed to restore Angel's soul, but Drusilla notices and alerts Angelus, who chases down and murders Jenny, leaving her body as a gift to Giles. Furious and heartbroken, Giles attempts to take his revenge on Angelus but is saved by Buffy who claims she can't fight her mission on her own. Meanwhile, Xander and Cordelia, and Willow and Oz, now a werewolf after being bitten by his young cousin, officially begin dating and both Cordy and Oz become genuine members of the Scooby Gang. Willow also begins teaching Ms. Calendar's computer science class due to her extremely high aptitude and subsequently becomes interested in Jenny's notes and websites devoted to magic. Spike becomes increasingly jealous over Angelus and Drusilla's apparently sexual relationship while he is left unable to walk. In "I Only Have Eyes For You" it turns out that Spike is in fact ambulatory and that he is hatching a plan of his own to take his revenge on Angelus and win Drusilla back.

During the season finale, Buffy and Willow come across the spell Jenny was working on just prior to her death. While they deliberate on what is to be done, Kendra returns to Sunnydale by word of her Watcher, who claims that a dark power is once again rising at the Hellmouth. This power turns out to be the stone statue of the powerful demon Acathla who, once upon a time, attempted to swallow the world into Hell. Angelus hatches a plan to awaken Acathla once again and destroy the world. After he fails to awaken the demon, however, Angelus sends a team led by Drusilla to kidnap Giles while he calls Buffy out to distract her. As Giles is taken away, Willow is left comatose, Xander's arm is broken, and Drusilla kills Kendra. Buffy returns to the library to find the police waiting for her. She flees their attack and makes it to the hospital to find her friends. When no one can find Giles, she goes to his house and finds a demon named Whistler (Max Perlich). He tells her that what happened with Acathla wasn't meant to go the way it did — Angel is in fact the key that will re-open Acathla but the Powers that Be thought that Angel's destiny was to stop him. Drusilla uses her psychic powers to trick Giles into giving Angelus this information after Angelus sadistically tortures the Watcher. Meanwhile, Willow awakens from her coma after a proclamation of love from best friend Xander and adamantly decides to try to perform the ritual of restoration to return Angel's soul. Spike joins forces with Buffy to help take down Angelus while Buffy's mom, Joyce Summers (Kristine Sutherland), finally figures out the truth about her destined daughter. As Buffy leaves to retrieve a mystical sword brought to Sunnydale by Kendra, Joyce tells Buffy never to come back. Sunnydale High School Principal Snyder (Armin Shimerman) expels Buffy from Sunnydale High. With nothing left, Buffy storms Angelus' mansion while Xander aids a weakened Giles. Buffy is too late, even with Spike's help (who takes Drusilla out of the fray). Angelus uses his blood to reawaken Acathla. As Buffy and Angelus compete in an epic sword fight, Acathla begins to swallow the earth. Meanwhile, Willow successfully performs the powerful spell after she is overcome by an unknown mystical energy. As Angel's soul is returned, Buffy has one chance to save the world and, after kissing him and proclaiming that she loves him, runs the magical sword through Angel's chest; he is swallowed by the portal, closing it for good. Left utterly devastated, Buffy flees Sunnydale.

== Cast and characters ==
=== Main cast ===
- Sarah Michelle Gellar as Buffy Summers
- Nicholas Brendon as Xander Harris
- Alyson Hannigan as Willow Rosenberg
- Charisma Carpenter as Cordelia Chase
- David Boreanaz as Angel
- Anthony Stewart Head as Rupert Giles

=== Recurring cast ===
- Juliet Landau as Drusilla
- James Marsters as Spike
- Kristine Sutherland as Joyce Summers
- Robia LaMorte as Jenny Calendar
- Seth Green as Daniel "Oz" Osbourne
- Armin Shimerman as Principal Snyder
- Danny Strong as Jonathan Levinson
- Bianca Lawson as Kendra Young
- Larry Bagby as Larry Blaisdell
- Dean Butler as Hank Summers
- Andrew J. Ferchland as The Anointed One
- Saverio Guerra as Willy the Snitch
- Jason Hall as Devon MacLeish
- Mercedes McNab as Harmony Kendall
- Max Perlich as Whistler
- Robin Sachs as Ethan Rayne
- Eric Saiet as Dalton
- Vincent Schiavelli as Uncle Enios
- Brian Thompson as The Judge

=== Guest cast ===
- Elizabeth Anne Allen as Amy Madison
- Julie Benz as Darla
- Julia Lee as Chanterelle
- Mark Metcalf as the Master
- John Ritter as Ted Buchanan
- Ara Celi as Inca Princess/Ampata Gutierez
- Jason Behr as Billy "Ford" Fordham

== Production and crew ==
Series creator Joss Whedon served as executive producer and showrunner. Besides Whedon, only David Greenwalt and Rob Des Hotel & Dean Batali, now executive story editors, returned. Whedon wrote the most episodes, writing five by himself and co-writing one with co-executive producer David Greenwalt, and doing another story with Greenwalt, totaling seven episodes. Marti Noxon joined as a staff writer (promoted to story editor midseason) and wrote the next highest number of episodes, writing five on her own and co-writing one with Howard Gordon, who joined as consulting producer for the first half of the season. Greenwalt devised the story for "School Hard" with Whedon, but wrote the teleplay solo. The season was shot through 1997. Greenwalt wrote and directed "Ted" with Whedon as well. Rob Des Hotel and Dean Batali (returning from the first season) wrote three episodes together. Freelance writer Carl Ellsworth was fired following his first episode "Halloween". David Tyron King wrote two freelance episodes (as Ty King), King was previously an executive producer on the previous series Whedon worked on, Parenthood (1990). Former story editors Matt Kiene and Joe Reinkemeyer returned and wrote one freelance episode. The other freelanced script of the season was "Go Fish", written by husband and wife team David Fury and Elin Hampton, Fury would continue to write freelance in the following season before joining the show full-time.

Both Joss Whedon and Bruce Seth Green directed the highest number of episodes in the second season, directing five episodes each. Later regular directors on the series, David Solomon (also co-producer) and James A. Contner directed their first episodes in the second season.

== Episodes ==
No. overall	No. in season	Title	Directed by	Written by	Original release date	Prod. code	U.S. viewers (millions)
13	1	"When She Was Bad"	Joss Whedon	Joss Whedon	September 15, 1997	5V01	4.37
After a quiet summer, Xander and Willow are attacked by a vampire, but saved by Buffy, who has returned from Los Angeles. Buffy has a dream where the Master, whom she had killed earlier, (Note: As depicted in the Season 1 finale "Prophecy Girl".) attacks her again. Angel appears in Buffy's room and warns her that The Anointed One is gathering vampires to him. At The Bronze, Buffy flirts with Xander in front of Angel and Willow. Cordelia confronts Buffy about her behavior, but Buffy rejects the advice and leaves. Soon after Buffy's back is turned, Cordelia is attacked and kidnapped. Buffy discovers that The Master's skeleton has disappeared from the grave, and Giles suggests that The Anointed One will attempt to use the skeleton to revive him. Someone delivers a message to the library, summoning Buffy to The Bronze. On the way, she runs into Angel, and challenges him to a fight, but they go to the Bronze together. Once there, they find only a single vampire. At the library, several vampires capture Giles and Willow, taking them, along with Cordelia and Jenny Calendar, to The Master's skeleton. Buffy finds them and attacks the vampires, overpowering them and smashing the skeleton, while Angel and Xander rescue the prisoners.
14	2	"Some Assembly Required"	Bruce Seth Green	Ty King	September 22, 1997	5V02	4.42
After killing some vampires, Buffy and Angel find an open grave, from which the body has been stolen. Later, Cordelia and Angel come across body parts belonging to three girls who died in a car crash. Buffy and her friends suspect that two science students, Chris and Eric, have been using the body parts to create a new body, with the intention of resurrecting it to build a bride for Chris's brother Daryl, who had died several months earlier and has already been reanimated. Chris and Eric decide that they need a fresh head, as the process of adding formaldehyde to the corpses has caused the brains to decay too quickly. They attempt to kidnap Cordelia, but Buffy arrives in time to rescue her. Buffy persuades Chris to abandon the plan, but Eric and Daryl kidnap Cordelia at a football game. Chris leads Buffy to the lab, where she fights Daryl. During the fight, Buffy accidentally sets the lab on fire. Daryl stays with the unfinished body and burns along with it. Separately, Giles and Jenny enjoy a first date and make plans for a second, while Angel and Buffy walk to his home, holding hands.
15	3	"School Hard"	John T. Kretchmer	Story by : Joss Whedon & David Greenwalt; Teleplay by : David Greenwalt	September 29, 1997	5V03	4.86
Buffy and a fellow student, Sheila, are tasked with helping out on the upcoming parent-teacher evening. Two vampires, Spike and Drusilla, who is currently ill, arrive in Sunnydale, and meet The Anointed One. Spike offers to deal with Buffy. At The Bronze, Spike introduces himself to Buffy and promises to kill her. Spike takes Sheila to Drusilla, who turns Sheila into a vampire. Angel reveals that he knows Spike from his past life as Angelus, and Giles learns that Spike has previously killed two Slayers. At the parent-teacher evening, Spike, Sheila, and several other vampires attack the attendees, including Buffy's mother Joyce and Principal Snyder. Buffy locks the adults in a room for safety before facing the vampires. Angel arrives, pretending to be Angelus, but Spike sees through the ruse. Angel and Xander retreat. Sheila joins Buffy, and attempts to attack her, but Giles warns Buffy in time. Spike defeats Buffy, but before he can kill her, Joyce attacks him, and he leaves. Snyder covers up the incident as gang-related. The Anointed One attempts to extract penance from Spike, but Spike forces him into sunlight, killing him. Spike declares that there should be "more fun" around Sunnydale from now on.
16	4	"Inca Mummy Girl"	Ellen S. Pressman	Matt Kiene & Joe Reinkemeyer	October 6, 1997	5V04	4.70
At a museum, a mummified Incan princess is revived after sucking the life force from a student who broke her seal of protection. Buffy and her friends notice that the student is missing, and go to the museum, finding his corpse in place of the mummy's. The mummy kills an exchange student who was due to meet Buffy, and takes his place, calling herself Ampata. Xander is smitten with Ampata, and the two start a relationship. Ampata asks Giles to destroy the seal. A man later revealed to be the princess's bodyguard attacks Ampata on several occasions, but she eventually kills him. Ampata tells Buffy the story of how the Incan girl was sacrificed to save her people, a story Buffy sympathizes with as the Slayer. Xander and Ampata go to a dance together. At the dance, the guitarist, Oz, notices Willow. Buffy and Giles find the real exchange student's body, and realize that Ampata is the mummy. Ampata kisses Xander, but pushes him away before sucking his life force. Giles tries to repair the seal, but Ampata stops him. In the ensuing fight, Ampata tries to restore herself fully by kissing Xander, but wastes away.
17	5	"Reptile Boy"	David Greenwalt	David Greenwalt	October 13, 1997	5V05	4.77
A girl attempts to escape a frat party, but is recaptured. Buffy and Giles are pleased at the apparent lack of activity around the Hellmouth. Giles hopes to use the time to train, but Buffy is reluctant. Buffy meets Angel, and they discuss dating, but Angel is reluctant and Buffy leaves angrily. Buffy chooses to go with Cordelia to a frat party. Xander also attends the party, but is recognized as a gate crasher and forced to dress as a girl. After the party was over, the pair are drugged and chained up in the basement along with the girl captured earlier. The frat boys are in fact the Delta Zeta Keppas who are members of a cult group worshiping Machida, a reptile demon, to whom virgin girls are offered as sacrifices. Willow mentions that Brittany Oswald vanished along with Kelly Percell last year, and she, Angel and Giles realize the danger Buffy is in and Xander, dressed in a frat boys' robe, arrives to help. Cordelia is chosen as the first victim of the sacrifice, but Buffy distracts Machida, breaks free of her chains, takes down three frat boys and kills the demon while Giles, Willow, Xander and Angel arrive at the house and subdue the rest of the party. Battered and bruised, the frat boys are all sent to jail after they get arrested and the cult collapses as a result. Giles promises to push Buffy less hard in the future. Angel asks to have coffee with Buffy.
18	6	"Halloween"	Bruce Seth Green	Carl Ellsworth	October 27, 1997	5V06	5.88
Buffy slays a vampire while another vampire records the fight. Spike studies the footage. Later, Buffy goes to The Bronze to meet Angel, but leaves after seeing him with Cordelia. Eager to learn more about Angel's past, Willow and Buffy sneak into Giles' office and retrieve a diary. In preparation for Halloween, Buffy buys a dress from a man, Ethan Rayne, who performs an incantation turning everybody who bought their costume from him into a real version of their costume. Willow becomes a ghost, Xander a soldier, and Buffy becomes an 18th century noblewoman. Xander and Buffy forget who they are while Willow retains her memories and reluctantly takes leadership. The three retreat to Buffy's house along with Cordelia. In the chaos, Spike and several vampires emerge. Willow leaves to get Giles, while Angel arrives to help. Angel repels a vampire, but Buffy, scared, runs outside. Willow and Giles visit Ethan's shop, and Giles and Ethan recognize each other. Spike finds Buffy and attacks her. Giles breaks the spell in time for Buffy to remember her true self and defeat Spike, who retreats. Angel and Buffy meet afterwards, and, after a short conversation, they kiss. Giles finds a note from Ethan, who promises to return.
19	7	"Lie to Me"	Joss Whedon	Joss Whedon	November 3, 1997	5V07	4.98
Angel runs into Drusilla and warns her to leave town. Buffy sees the two together. Billy "Ford" Fordham, a student who knew Buffy at LA, arrives, claiming to have transferred to Sunnydale, and joins Buffy and her friends. Buffy asks Angel about the previous night, but he lies about it, prompting Buffy to leave. Ford reveals that he knows Buffy is the Slayer. Angel and Willow discover that Ford has not in fact transferred to Sunnydale, and that Ford and his friends admire vampires. Buffy and Ford meet two vampires. Buffy kills one, but Ford lets the other go, telling Buffy that he killed it. Later, Buffy sees the same vampire fleeing the library, and realizes that Ford lied to her. Ford meets with Spike and offers to deliver Buffy to him in exchange for becoming a vampire. Buffy confronts Angel, who reveals that he turned Drusilla into a vampire. Buffy visits Ford and his friends, who lock her in with them. Ford reveals he wants to become a vampire because he is terminally ill. Spike and several vampires attack. Buffy captures Drusilla, forcing Spike to call off the attack. She locks them in with Ford, who is transformed into a vampire. Buffy kills Ford shortly after he rises from his grave.
20	8	"The Dark Age"	Bruce Seth Green	Dean Batali & Rob Des Hotel	November 10, 1997	5V08	5.59
A man looking for Giles is strangled to death by a woman, Dierdre, who melts and dies. Police, linking the deaths to Giles, take him to the morgue. He recognizes the man as Philip, whom he knew in London, along with a tattoo that Giles also has. Buffy and Angel fight vampires at the hospital. Buffy, who expected Giles there, visits him afterwards, finding him disheveled. Giles learns that another old friend from the same group is also dead. Buffy, investigating, finds Ethan and learns that he knows Giles. Philip, still dead, arrives and attacks. Buffy traps Philip, who melts away. Some of the liquid touches Jenny. Willow discovers that the tattoo is the Mark of Eyghon, a demon who can pass between bodies. A possessed Jenny attacks Giles, but Buffy stops her, although Jenny escapes. Giles reveals that he and some friends used Eyghon like a drug, but lost control of the demon. Ethan, who also has the mark, captures Buffy and tattoos her, erasing his own. Jenny arrives, fully possessed, and attacks Buffy and Giles. Angel arrives and attacks Jenny. Eyghon passes to Angel, but Angel's vampire form defeats Eyghon and expels the demon.
21	9	"What's My Line? (Part 1)"	David Solomon	Howard Gordon & Marti Noxon	November 17, 1997	5V09	5.04
Seeking a cure for Drusilla's illness, Spike tries to read a book stolen from Giles, but learns that it is in code. Angel visits Buffy, warning her of impending danger and arranging a date. A vampire, seen by Buffy, steals the code key from a mausoleum and escapes. Seeking to kill Buffy before she can interfere, Spike calls on an order of assassins. Willow and Oz are recruited by a software company, meeting for the first time. Buffy goes to meet Angel, but is attacked. She and Angel kill the assassin. Angel recognizes the assassin's symbol and asks Buffy to hide. As they kiss goodbye, Kendra, another Slayer, watches from a distance. Giles also warns Buffy that there may be more assassins after her, including shapeshifters, making Buffy paranoid. She retreats to Angel's house. Angel learns from Willy, a bar owner, that Spike is behind the assassins, but Kendra captures and imprisons him. Cordelia and Xander search for Buffy at her house, and are visited by an assassin made from hundreds of worm-like creatures. Kendra finds Buffy and they fight, before Kendra introduces herself as a Slayer.
22	10	"What's My Line? (Part 2)"	David Semel	Marti Noxon	November 24, 1997	5V10	5.41
Buffy and Kendra, who became a Slayer after Buffy's death the previous year, break off their fight and agree to work together. Willy finds Angel and takes him to Spike, who in turn presents him to Drusilla. At Buffy's house, the worm assassin attacks Xander and Cordelia; they hide in the basement. Xander and Cordelia, still trapped, argue and insult each other, but then suddenly kiss, before attempting to escape. At the careers fair, an assassin posing as a policewoman shoots at Buffy, hitting Oz after he jumps in front of Willow. Buffy and Kendra fight her off. Giles discovers that Drusilla can use Angel in a ritual to cure her. While preparing to rescue Angel, Kendra and Buffy talk about their different approaches to the life of a Slayer. After interrogating Willy, Buffy rushes to Angel's aid against Kendra's advice, and is immediately captured. Spike begins the ritual, and the assassins bring Buffy to Spike. Kendra arrives, joined by Willow, Xander, Giles, and Cordelia, and the group fight the vampires and assassins, killing several and rescuing Angel. Xander and Cordelia begin a relationship. Drusilla, now restored to full health, pulls an injured Spike from the wreckage.
23	11	"Ted"	Bruce Seth Green	David Greenwalt & Joss Whedon	December 8, 1997	5V11	6.09
Buffy returns home to find Joyce kissing a man, Ted. Buffy is perturbed at the thought of her mother dating, but Angel persuades her to give Ted a chance. At a minigolf outing, Ted gets angry at Buffy and threatens her, before reverting to normal upon seeing Joyce. Joyce does not believe Buffy's account of the incident. After another argument, Buffy comes home to find Ted in her bedroom. Ted confronts her about being a Slayer, and takes her diary. Buffy tries to stop him, but Ted hits her, and the two fight. Buffy kicks Ted down the stairs, and he dies. Buffy is horrified, although police treat the death as accidental. Xander, Willow, and Cordelia investigate Ted and discover that he has had several previous marriages. Buffy, in her room and distraught, is surprised by Ted, who attacks her. Buffy damages him, revealing that he is an android. At Ted's house, Xander finds the bodies of his four previous wives. Ted meets Joyce, lying that he was only unconscious, but some damage causes Ted to malfunction and act aggressively towards Joyce. Buffy destroys Ted soon afterwards.
24	12	"Bad Eggs"	David Greenwalt	Marti Noxon	January 12, 1998	5V12	6.48
Buffy rescues a woman from a vampire, Lyle, who escapes. At health class, the teacher, Mr. Whitmore, assigns everybody an egg to look after. Buffy's egg hatches at night, inserting a tendril into Buffy's ear while she is asleep. Buffy wakes up, ill, but the egg is back to normal. The following night, Mr. Whitmore attacks a security guard who has found a large hole in the basement. Buffy's egg hatches soon after, revealing a creature that attempts to attach itself to Buffy. Buffy kills the creature and takes it to school to study. Willow and Cordelia, under the creatures' control, knock Buffy and Xander unconscious and go the basement, joined by several students. Giles places a creature on Joyce's back and they too go to the basement, digging up the floor to reveal the mother creature. Buffy and Xander follow another possessed student to the basement. Lyle and his brother Tector attack Buffy, and all three fight the possessed students. The mother creature swallows Tector and Buffy, but, while inside the creature, she kills it, freeing everybody from possession. Lyle flees. The incident is covered up as a gas leak.
25	13	"Surprise"	Michael Lange	Marti Noxon	January 19, 1998	5V13	7.59
Buffy has a nightmare in which Drusilla kills Angel in front of her. Fearing for Angel, she visits his apartment, but Angel assures her that everything is fine. Oz and Willow arrange their first date at Buffy's surprise birthday party the following night. Jenny's Romani uncle visits and warns her that Angel is becoming happy due to his relationship with Buffy, and the curse placed on him is in danger of lifting. Jenny takes Buffy to the Bronze for the party, but Buffy fights two vampires just outside. Jenny finds an arm, and the group realize that Drusilla and Spike are attempting to reassemble an ancient demon, Judge, who cannot be killed by a "forged" weapon. Jenny asks Angel to take the arm far away. Vampires attack Angel and Buffy at the dock and recover the arm. Buffy and Angel sneak into Drusilla's party, discover that Judge has been restored, and are captured. They fight their way out and retreat to Angel's apartment. After recovering, they confess their love for each other and have sex, and then fall asleep together. Angel wakes up later, in pain and screaming Buffy's name.
26	14	"Innocence"	Joss Whedon	Joss Whedon	January 20, 1998	5V14	7.94
Buffy wakes to find Angel gone. Outside, Angel reverts to his soulless form, Angelus, after the curse restoring his soul is lifted, and he immediately kills a woman. Angelus joins Spike and Drusilla and plots Buffy's death. Willow comes across Xander and Cordelia kissing, and she leaves angrily. Buffy visits Angelus's apartment, and without disclosing that his soul is gone, he mocks her. Angelus visits the School and attacks Willow, leaving after Buffy and Jenny ward him off. Buffy leaves, heartbroken, but has a dream featuring Angel and Jenny and realizes that Jenny has information about Angel. Confronting Jenny, she reveals her Romani heritage and her knowledge of Angelus's curse. Xander and Cordelia visit a nearby army base to steal a rocket launcher. Angelus kills Jenny's uncle and takes the Judge to the mall, where he attacks everybody present. Armed with the rocket launcher, a modern weapon that wasn't forged, Buffy shoots and kills Judge. The gang recover the pieces of his body, planning to keep them separate, while Angelus and Buffy fight outside. Buffy overpowers Angelus, but cannot bring herself to kill him. Giles tries to console Buffy afterwards.
27	15	"Phases"	Bruce Seth Green	Rob Des Hotel & Dean Batali	January 27, 1998	5V15	7.31
A werewolf attacks Xander and Cordelia at night, while they are making out. They drive away and tell the others, including Oz. Giles warns that the werewolf will be active for three nights. Buffy investigates the following night and is caught in a trap set by Cain, a werewolf hunter, looking to sell the werewolf's pelt. Later, Buffy tracks the werewolf to The Bronze, but it escapes. The werewolf stumbles upon Angelus, who retreats, leaving his latest victim, Theresa. The following morning, the werewolf, in fact Oz, reverts to his human form. Xander accuses another student, Larry, of being the werewolf, but he reveals instead that he is gay. Theresa, now a vampire, attacks Buffy on Angelus' orders, but Xander kills her. Willow visits Oz's home and learns that he is the werewolf. She tells Buffy and Giles, and they track Oz down, as does Cain, who uses bait to lure Oz. Buffy stops Cain from shooting Oz, and Willow shoots him with a tranquilizer. Buffy threatens Cain out of town. Willow and Oz agree to continue seeing each other despite his nature.
28	16	"Bewitched, Bothered and Bewildered"	James A. Contner	Marti Noxon	February 10, 1998	5V16	6.77
On Valentine's Day, Cordelia breaks up with Xander after being shunned by her friends. Buffy receives a "gift" of roses from Angelus, along with a warning that he has more planned. Xander asks Amy, whose mother was a witch, to cast a love spell on Cordelia. However, the spell ends up affecting every woman in Sunnydale apart from Cordelia, including Buffy, Amy, and Willow, who hit on Xander in turn. Giles seeks a solution, while Amy and Buffy fight over Xander, Amy turning Buffy into a rat. Xander saves Cordelia from an attack by several girls, angry at her for breaking up with Xander. They retreat to Buffy's house, where Joyce also flirts with Xander, before Angelus attacks. However, Drusilla, also affected by the spell, stops Angelus's attack. Xander and Cordelia escape them and the growing mob. Amy and Giles reverse the spells affecting Buffy and the rest of the town. Xander and Cordelia reconcile after she decides not to bow to her friends' wishes.
29	17	"Passion"	Michael Gershman	Ty King	February 24, 1998	5V17	6.14
Angelus visits Buffy's room at night, leaving a picture of her sleeping. Angelus later visits Willow's house and kills her pet fish. Buffy fears that Angelus will target Joyce next, and seeks advice from Giles on how to stop Angelus from being able to enter their homes. Angelus meets Joyce and reveals that he and Buffy had sex. Buffy and Willow cast the spell to keep Angelus out of Buffy's house before he can break in again. Jenny seeks to restore the curse that had given Angelus back his soul, and translates the ancient ritual. However, Drusilla senses her plan, and warns Angelus, who breaks into the school and destroys Jenny's computer, before killing her. Giles returns home to find a rose left by Angelus. Thinking it was left by Jenny, he goes upstairs to find her dead body. Angelus watches through the window when Buffy and Willow receive the news of Jenny's death. Enraged, Giles attacks Angelus's and Spike's lair, setting it on fire. Angelus overpowers Giles, but Buffy arrives and fights Angelus. Angelus escapes when Buffy is forced to rescue Giles from the fire.
30	18	"Killed by Death"	Deran Sarafian	Rob Des Hotel & Dean Batali	March 3, 1998	5V18	6.08
Buffy falls ill from flu, collapsing during a fight with Angelus, and is taken to hospital. In an apparent dream, she sees a boy outside her room, followed by a demonic figure. When Buffy wakes, she overhears a conversation about experimental treatments, and finds the boy, Ryan, who warns her that "Death" visits the hospital regularly. She enlists the help of her friends to investigate. They learn that Dr. Backer, who works at the hospital, has a history of controversial experimentation on children. Later, Buffy watches Dr. Backer attacked and killed by the demon, although she can no longer see it. Cordelia and Giles learn that the demon is called Kindestod (German for "the child's death"), while Buffy and Willow learn that Dr. Backer's treatment was working on the children. Realizing that Kindestod is only visible to the sick, Buffy re-infects herself. She finds all the children gone, and sees Kindestod heading to the basement. Kindestod attacks Ryan there, but Buffy intervenes while Xander rescues the children. After a fight, Buffy breaks Kindestod's neck.
31	19	"I Only Have Eyes for You"	James Whitmore, Jr.	Marti Noxon	April 28, 1998	5V19	5.06
Buffy intervenes to stop a male student from shooting a female student, but immediately afterwards the gun disappears and the two have no memory of their argument. Later in class, Buffy has a daydream about a relationship between a teacher, Grace, and her student James. Later, Giles overhears a janitor argue with and shoot another teacher. Willow learns that James shot Grace, before killing himself, after she tried to end their affair. In the cafeteria later, all the food turns into snakes. Snyder and the police chief discuss the incident, revealing that they both know about the Hellmouth. Willow, Buffy, Xander, and Cordelia attempt an exorcism, but their attempt is foiled and a swarm of wasps invades the school, forcing the group out. Buffy returns to the school, now possessed by James' spirit. Angelus arrives, but is soon also possessed by Grace's spirit, and they re-enact the last night of James' and Grace's life. Buffy shoots Angelus, and goes to the music room. About to shoot herself, she is joined by Angelus, and Grace's and James' spirits reconcile. Later, Angelus and Drusilla go out to feed, and Spike gets up from his wheelchair.
32	20	"Go Fish"	David Semel	David Fury & Elin Hampton	May 5, 1998	5V20	5.13
A member of the school's swim team is found dead. Soon after, Xander hears another member screaming from the cafeteria, and finds his skin along with a fish-like monster. Buffy tails Gage, a third member of the team, fearing that he is the next target. Gage later runs into Angelus, who attacks him. Buffy intervenes, noticing that Angelus spat out Gage's blood rather than drinking it. Xander joins the swim team in order to investigate, learning that the team are being given steroids in the sauna. In the changing rooms, the monster attacks Gage. Buffy again intervenes, before watching Gage turning into an identical monster. Swim Coach Marin and Nurse Greenliegh discuss the crisis, revealing that they worked together to infuse the team with fish DNA. Greenliegh attempts to end the experiment, but Marin pushes her into the sewers, where she is killed by the monsters. Buffy talk with Marin about the experiments, but he tries to make his creatures eat her. She fights off the monsters and Marin ends up getting eaten by them. Giles rounds up Xander and the remaining team members and manages to cure them.
33	21	"Becoming (Part 1)"	Joss Whedon	Joss Whedon	May 12, 1998	5V21	5.30
Giles investigates an ancient stone block found at the museum. Willow and Buffy find a floppy disk belonging to Jenny, and learn that it has a copy of the curse that can restore Angelus's soul. Drusilla and Angelus break into the museum to steal the block, which holds the demon Acathla, who has the ability to suck the entire world into hell. Kendra arrives, having been warned by her Watcher about Acathla's impending resurrection, bringing with her an enchanted sword that can help defeat the demon. Angelus attempts, but fails, to awaken Acathla. Angelus sends a messenger to summon Buffy to the cemetery. Kendra stays behind to protect the others, while Buffy meets and fights with Angelus. Willow and Giles attempt to perform the curse to restore Angelus's soul, but are interrupted by several vampires, including Drusilla, who hypnotizes then kills Kendra and kidnaps Giles. Buffy, realizing the fight was a distraction, rushes back to the school, finding Kendra's body and a comatose Willow. Flashbacks through the episode show Angelus becoming a vampire in 1750s Ireland, tormenting Drusilla in London in 1860, being cursed by Roma in 1898, meeting a benevolent demon called Whistler in 1996, and seeing Buffy for the first time.
34	22	"Becoming (Part 2)"	Joss Whedon	Joss Whedon	May 19, 1998	5V22	6.37
Police find Buffy with Kendra's dead body and attempt to arrest her, but she escapes. Returning home, she finds Whistler, who says that Angelus was supposed to defeat Acathla. Buffy later meets Spike, who offers to help stop Angelus, as he has no desire to see the world end. Buffy and Spike return to her home, meeting Joyce, and Buffy reveals to Joyce her role as Slayer. At Willow's bedside, Xander confesses his love for her. Willow wakes up soon after, calling for Oz. She decides to try again to perform the curse to restore Angelus's soul. Buffy meets Snyder, who expels her. Drusilla hypnotizes Giles, appearing to him as Jenny. He reveals that Angelus's blood is the key to awakening Acathla. Whistler tells Buffy that only Angel's blood can defeat Acathla. Buffy and Spike team up to stop Angelus before he can complete the ritual. Drusilla joins Angelus's side in the ensuing fight. Willow taps into newfound magical awareness to complete the curse, restoring Angelus's soul. Acathla begins to awake, and Buffy is forced to stab Angel, sending him and the demon to hell. Spike takes Drusilla away from Sunnydale, while Buffy also leaves.

== Reception ==
Rotten Tomatoes reported an approval rating of 92% with an average score of 7.5/10, based on 13 reviews. The website's critics consensus reads, "Buffy finds its footing in season two, crafting a season that balances supernatural hauntings and high school happenings with ease."

The two-part episode "Surprise"/"Innocence" won an Emmy Award for Outstanding Makeup for a Series. Christophe Beck won a Primetime Emmy Award for Outstanding Music Composition for a Series for "Becoming (Part 1)". The season finale, "Becoming (Parts 1 & 2)", was also nominated for a Primetime Emmy Award for Outstanding Hairstyling for a Series.

Included on Pajiba.com's 2008 list of the best 20 seasons of the past 20 years, it is ranked as the best season of the series by some publications.

== Home media ==
Buffy the Vampire Slayer: The Complete Second Season was released on DVD in region 1 on June 11, 2002 and in region 2 on May 21, 2001. The DVD includes all 22 episodes on 6 discs presented in full frame 1.33:1 aspect ratio. Special features on the DVD include four commentary tracks—"Reptile Boy" by writer and director David Greenwalt, "What's My Line" (Parts 1 & 2) by co-writer Marti Noxon and "Innocence" by writer and director Joss Whedon. Whedon also discusses the episodes "Surprise", "Innocence", "Passion", "I Only Have Eyes For You" and "Becoming" (Parts 1 & 2) in interviews. Scripts for "Reptile Boy", "What's My Line" (Parts 1 & 2) and "Innocence" are included. Featurettes include "Designing Buffy", a 15-minute featurette which details the set designs; "A Buffy Bestiary", a 30-minute featurette detailing the monsters featured in the season; and "Beauty and Beasts", a 20-minute featurette showcasing the make-up process. Also included are cast biographies, photo galleries, and series trailers.
