= The Dark Age (Buffy the Vampire Slayer) =

- Buffy the Vampire Slayer episode
- Episode no.: Season 2 Episode 8
- Directed by: Bruce Seth Green
- Written by: Dean Batali; Rob Des Hotel
- Production code: 5V08
- Original air date: November 10, 1997

Guest appearances
- Robia LaMorte as Jenny Calendar; Robin Sachs as Ethan Rayne; Stuart McLean as Philip Henry; Wendy Way as Dierdre Page; Michael Earl Reid as Custodian; Daniel Henry Murray as Creepy Cult Guy; Carlease Burke as Detective Winslow; Tony Sears as Morgue Attendant; John Bellucci as Man

Episode chronology
← Previous "Lie to Me"	Next → "What's My Line"
- Buffy the Vampire Slayer season 2

"The Dark Age" is episode eight of season two of Buffy the Vampire Slayer. The episode aired on The WB on November 10, 1997. It was written by executive story editors Rob Des Hotel and Dean Batali and was directed by Bruce Seth Green. The narrative follows Giles, whose friend has died, prompting the Scooby Gang to unravel his mysterious past; meanwhile, Buffy crashes into Ethan Rayne again.

== Plot ==
A man is hurriedly making his way through the school grounds trying to find Giles, when he is approached by a decomposing woman, "Dierdre". As Giles is distracted by Buffy playing loud music in the library while doing calisthenics, he does not hear the man's cries for help at the door as the corpse strangles him, before falling to the ground and dissolving.

The next day, Giles tells Buffy to meet him later at the hospital where there will be a blood delivery, which attracts vampires. When Giles gets back to the library, a detective is waiting for him who informs Giles that there was a homicide on campus and the dead man had Giles' address on him. Giles identifies the body as an old friend from London, Philip Henry. The body has a tattoo, which Giles claims he does not recognize.

Shaken, Giles begins drinking in his grief and does not meet Buffy at the hospital, and she battles the doctor-dressed vampires alone until Angel shows up. She goes to check on Giles, but he shuts the door on her and calls another friend in London and finds out that his other friend Dierdre Page is dead too. Out of sight, he rolls up his sleeves, revealing that he has the same tattoo as Philip. Meanwhile, Philip comes back to life in the morgue, his eyes flashing, and escapes.

On Saturday, Cordelia finally tells Buffy about the homicide detective's visit. In the library, Buffy finds Giles' former friend Ethan Rayne, the costume shop owner who had caused chaos on Halloween. As she calls Giles, Ethan mentions the "Mark of Eyghon". Giles says she is in danger, and the dead Philip enters.

A panicked Giles shows up and, after a scuffle which leaves Jenny unconscious, Philip dissolves. When Jenny comes to, she seems normal but her eyes flash. Willow discovers the "Mark of Eyghon" in a book: the demon Eyghon has the ability to possess the body of a dead or unconscious host. They figure out that the demon has jumped from Philip's body to Jenny's. Possessed, Jenny tries to seduce Giles at his apartment. When Buffy comes to the rescue, Jenny jumps out the window. Giles explains to Buffy that he ran with a bad crowd when he was young, and they used the demon Eyghon as a temporary high – directing him in and out of each other's bodies. But one friend died, then Dierdre, and now it seems the rest of the group is being killed.

Buffy goes to the deserted costume shop to try to defend Ethan against Eyghon. Ethan knocks her out, ties her up and puts the mark of Eyghon on her. He then uses acid to remove his own tattoo so that Eyghon will take Buffy instead of him. Jenny enters, completely demonic, and Buffy breaks free. Angel arrives and chokes Jenny until she loses consciousness, whereupon Eyghon moves to the nearest dead body: that of Angel. The two demons, the vampire within and Eyghon, fight for control in Angel's body, and Eyghon is destroyed. Jenny returns to normal, but Ethan escapes. Traumatized by her actions in the incident, Jenny tells Giles that she needs to take a break from their relationship in order to heal, leaving him unsure if she will ever forgive him.

== Continuity ==
=== Arc significance ===
Myles McNutt writes,

One of the things that is really interesting about this season is that there's some stealth seriality going on. If you were to read basic loglines for ("Lie To Me") and "The Dark Age," the connection wouldn't be overly clear, and you'd presume that the episode is more or less just a continuation of the Ethan Rayne story from "Halloween." However, the final scene of "Lie to Me" sets up questions between Buffy and Giles as it relates to maturity and challenges of the future; Giles' lie, that good and evil are always clear, plays as a broad statement about the series as a whole in that moment, but viewed in the context of "The Dark Age" we realize that Giles was talking about his own past, and his own present."

Xander refers to his Uncle Rory being a taxidermist. This is corroborated in episode 16 of season 6 ("Hell's Bells") by Rory pointing out a poorly stuffed animal head at Xander and Anya's wedding.

== Reception ==
"The Dark Age" had an audience of 3.7 million households on its original airing.

Vox ranked it at #81 of all 144 episodes on their "Every Episode Ranked From Worst to Best" list (to mark the 20th anniversary of the show), writing, "This is one of the episodes that most toys with the idea of Giles having a super-cool, super-dark hidden backstory, and its conclusion neatly foreshadows the rest of Angel’s arc in season two."

According to The A.V. Club, "The Dark Age" formed a good companion to the episode "Lie To Me", further exploring themes of good and evil and how light and dark can exist in the same character. It also provides insight into the character of Giles, who is central to the episode, and illustrates a common theme of Buffy, that "stains spread", that bad deeds can have long-running consequences. Critically Touched found it interesting thematically but poor on the technical level with "far too many scenes that feel very awkwardly stitched together".
