= Drusilla (Buffy the Vampire Slayer) =

Fictional character from TV series Buffy the Vampire Slayer and Angel

- Buffy the Vampire Slayer / Angel character
- Juliet Landau as Drusilla.
- First appearance: "School Hard" (1997)
- Last appearance: Finale (2018)
- Created by: Joss Whedon; David Greenwalt
- Portrayed by: Juliet Landau

In-universe information
- Affiliation: Wolfram & Hart; The Whirlwind
- Classification: Vampire
- Notable powers: Supernatural strength, speed and durability Enhanced healing Immortality; Psychic abilities include precognition and hypnosis

Drusilla, or Dru for short, is a fictional character on the television series Buffy the Vampire Slayer and Angel, portrayed by Juliet Landau. Created by Joss Whedon and David Greenwalt, she is introduced as a main antagonist alongside her lover Spike in the second season of Buffy. In addition to returning in subsequent seasons, the character is featured as a villain on the spin-off show Angel as well.

Flashbacks in both series reveal Drusilla's past as a young psychic in Victorian London who was driven insane by Angel before he ultimately turned her into a vampire. Spike and Dru are notably more subversive compared to other "Big Bads" that have opposed Buffy Summers. The duo was conceived as a Sid and Nancy-inspired vampiric pair so Landau chose to portray Drusilla with a Cockney accent, while the character's physical appearance drew from sources such as supermodel Kate Moss and the 1990s heroin chic aesthetic.

Following the conclusion of both series, Drusilla continued to appear in Expanded Universe materials in other media. Landau went on to co-write a two-issue Drusilla story arc for IDW Publishing's Angel comic book series in 2009, which continued her character's storyline.

== Character history ==
Drusilla's history unfolds in flashbacks scattered among numerous episodes of both Buffy the Vampire Slayer and Angel; they are not presented in chronological order. In "Lie to Me", Angel explains that, in 1860 when he was still Angelus, he became obsessed with Drusilla, a beautiful young Catholic woman who lived with her parents and two sisters in London. Angelus's sire Darla first discovered Drusilla, and presented her to Angelus as a new possible victim to torment. At first, Angelus suspected Drusilla of being a burgeoning saint, but he learned that she instead had psychic abilities (an uncommon but confirmed power of random humans in the Buffyverse), and was capable of occasionally foretelling the future, especially tragic situations. However, she believed this to be an evil affliction and wished to enter a nunnery to cleanse herself. Angelus sensed her purity and became obsessed with destroying her, as Drusilla had the potential for sainthood. Angelus first made contact with her by murdering Drusilla's priest, and impersonating him when she went to confession. When she confessed that she believed her abilities were evil, Angelus toyed with her by suggesting she embrace the evil instead of rejecting it. At some later point Angelus tortured and killed Drusilla's entire family, causing her to flee to a convent in Prague. On the day she was to take her holy vows, Angelus made her watch as he killed every person in the convent and engaged in sexual relations with Darla. The trauma of Angelus's atrocities drove Drusilla insane, and Angelus chose to turn her into a vampire, as he considered her a masterpiece, a testament to his talent. Believing death to be a mercy to her at this point, he chose to sire her to make her pain eternal as an immortal.

After being sired, Drusilla, now a predator, joined Angelus and Darla on their murderous travels. In 1880, Drusilla sired the young poet William, (first mentioned in “School Hard”). William the Bloody joined Drusilla and Angelus. Drusilla and William, later known as "Spike", shared an intimate relationship, though Angelus continued to engage in sexual relations with Dru as well.

Shortly after Angelus is cursed with a soul, Spike and Drusilla (unaware of the ensoulment) go their separate ways from Darla and Angel. At some point before their arrival in Sunnydale in late 1997, Drusilla is attacked and severely injured by an angry mob in Prague, leaving her in a weakened and frail condition. Spike cares for her, and the couple decide to travel to the Hellmouth in hopes that its energy will help to restore Drusilla's strength and health.

They arrive in Sunnydale in the episode "School Hard", and Spike plots the downfall of the current Slayer, Buffy Summers. When he discovers that Drusilla can be cured by the blood of her sire, Spike captures Angel and allows Drusilla to torture him until it is time to perform the ritual. Although Buffy and her friends save Angel, the ritual is successful. Drusilla, fully restored, now takes care of Spike, who has been temporarily paralyzed by Buffy's attack. When Angel reverts to Angelus, he re-joins the couple. Drusilla soon kills Kendra, another Slayer, by hypnotizing her and cutting her throat with a fingernail (which impresses Spike when he learns of it).

Drusilla is delighted by Angelus's determination to destroy the world and encourages his ongoing sexual attention; both dynamics strongly disturb Spike, who wants Drusilla to himself again and does not particularly want the world to end. Spike decides to help Buffy save the world in exchange for his and Drusilla's safe passage from Sunnydale. Drusilla resists Spike's betrayal of Angelus, and he attacks her, ultimately carrying her unconscious body from the fray.

Drusilla and Spike flee to Brazil, where Drusilla becomes disillusioned with their relationship. Spike's alliance with the Slayer, combined with Dru's skills of foresight and perception, prove to her that Spike is now tainted (not "demon enough" for her) and that he is developing feelings for Buffy. Drusilla breaks up with Spike, and he rejects her offer to remain friends.

Drusilla reappears on Angel in 2000, when Wolfram & Hart brings her to Los Angeles to re-sire Darla, who had been resurrected as a human dying of syphilis. Drusilla, who loves Darla like a "grandmum", and also more than that, over their 150-year-old complicated relationship, genuinely believes she is doing Darla a favor by siring her and is puzzled by Darla's brief rage before her renewed vampire nature kicks in. Reconciled, the two wreak havoc in the city until Angel sets them on fire. The two go underground to heal, but Drusilla leaves Darla, who is then protected by Lindsey McDonald.

Drusilla returns to Sunnydale in the episode "Crush" to persuade Spike to join Darla and herself in reforming their "family" unit, but instead, Spike seizes the opportunity to try to prove his love for Buffy by offering to stake Drusilla. Heartbroken by the actions of her former lover, Drusilla departs Sunnydale and remains at large. However, in season 7 of Buffy, the First Evil impersonates Drusilla in an unsuccessful attempt to break Spike's spirit. Spike claims that the First Evil's impersonation is not crazy enough to be Drusilla.

In Angel comics by IDW Publishing set after the television series ended, Drusilla reappears, breaking out of a psychiatric institution, in the story arc Drusilla (2009). Still mentally ill, her whereabouts since her last appearance in Angel remain unexplained. After assault by a crowd, she awakens, still pallid-skinned, in what appears to be Georgian London, in broad daylight and enters what seems to be her parents’ home. She encounters a doll (which may or may not be "Miss Edith") and is called by a third party, possibly her parents. It is uncertain whether this is an elaborate hallucination, time travel to her personal past or an alternate universe where she was never turned by Angelus. It is strongly implied, however, that the story actually takes place before Drusilla is sired, and the parts of it set in the modern day are actually a premonition in the human, 19th-century Drusilla's mind. She later reappears in the Spike mini-series (2010–11) by IDW, where she encounters Spike in Las Vegas, having allied herself with a human who believes Spike stole his soul. Spike has Buffy's friend Willow magically transfer his soul to Drusilla to give her a shot at redemption, but they are forced to reverse the spell when it drives her even madder than she already is.

The character next appears in Angel & Faith by Dark Horse Comics in the story arc "Daddy Issues" (2012), in which Drusilla has become sane thanks to the Lorophage demon, popularly referred to as the Highgate vampire, which ate her trauma and pain. In her new role as "Mother Superior", she sought to perform similar treatments on the citizens of London, which Angel likened to lobotomies. When Angel killed the Lorophage, Drusilla becomes insane once more, and is free. Dark Horse intended to release the 5-issue miniseries Drusilla: Run and Catch, examining what happened next for her, but it was delayed until the conclusion of Season Nine. Later in the Angel & Faith series, it transpires she went on to kill one of the London Slayers affiliated with Faith. She returns in the second series, in which she helps the demon Archaeus (the Master's sire) build an army of vampires to take over Magic Town. However she flees in the finale when Angel, Faith and their allies defeat Archaeus and his army in a battle.

In the Buffy the Vampire Slayer comic book by Boom! Studios, an alternate Drusilla appears as the villain "The Mistress".

== Powers and abilities ==
Drusilla has all the standard powers and vulnerabilities of a vampire, plus minor psychic abilities. She is immortal, regenerates damage, drains human blood to survive, and is stronger than most humans. Drusilla's technique in combat, although awkward-looking, has allowed her to briefly hold her own in a fight against Angel (in "Reunion") and Spike (in "Becoming, Part Two"), along with besting Kendra the Vampire Slayer (in "Becoming, Part One") before using the hypnosis technique and then killing her. It was also in this fight with Kendra that Drusilla showed that her fingernails are sharper than one would normally expect, as she uses them to slit Kendra's throat. Darla had demonstrated a similar technique when she sired Angel; whether this is due to vampiric abilities or physical manipulation of nails is unclear.

Drusilla is also a seer with minor psychic abilities. However, since she had these before becoming a vampire their source and cause are unknown. She receives vivid visions that contain possible glimpses of the future, and can also see into people's minds and project false imagery into them (e.g. in "Becoming, Part Two", when she convinces Giles that she is really Jenny Calendar). She is also capable of hypnotizing people, which she does by catching their gazes, pointing her fingers towards her victim's eyes and then to her own, whispering to them ("Be in my eyes, Be in me"). Drusilla uses this technique to murder Kendra in the episode "Becoming, Part One". The Master uses a similar skill to paralyze Buffy in "Prophecy Girl".

Like all vampires, she is vulnerable to holy items and sunlight, can be killed by decapitation or a stake to the heart, and cannot enter the home of a living human without first being invited by someone who lives there.

== Personality and appearance ==
Actress Juliet Landau said that when she first received the script, it indicated that Drusilla's accent could be British or American. Landau felt Drusilla "should really be Cockney, especially with the whole Sid and Nancy analogy." Though she never considered portraying Drusilla with a Southern American accent, as James Marsters had considered for Spike, she notes that invited comparisons with Blanche DuBois would also have been interesting.

Drusilla's madness is exhibited in her often-strange dialogue, which is peppered with non sequiturs like "Spike, do you love my insides? The parts you can't see?" Her behavior is girlish, accompanied by a dark, ironic twist. For instance, when she is happy, she will squeal and laugh like a young child, but she is happiest when committing torture, hunting humans, or witnessing mass destruction. She has a fondness for china dolls but keeps them blindfolded or gagged. She also loves flowers and cute animals, but is not sane enough to care for them; as she says, "Do you like daisies? I plant them but they always die. Everything I put in the ground withers and dies." She even goes so far as to own a Pekingese puppy. She speaks in a soft, mellow voice which contrasts with her dialogue.

Drusilla's costumes were initially intended to be a "cross between a Victorian period look and the Kate Moss heroin chic fashion look," says Landau.

== Appearances ==
Drusilla had 49 canonical Buffyverse appearances.

Buffy the Vampire Slayer

Drusilla appeared in 17 episodes.

- Season 2 (1997–98): "School Hard", "Halloween", "Lie to Me", "What's My Line, Part One", "What's My Line, Part Two", "Surprise", "Innocence", "Bewitched, Bothered and Bewildered", "Passion", "I Only Have Eyes For You", "Becoming, Part One", "Becoming, Part Two"
- Season 5 (2000–01): "Fool for Love", "Crush"
- Season 7 (2002–03): "Lessons", "Bring on the Night", "Lies My Parents Told Me"

Drusilla appeared in 3 canonical issues.

- Tales (2003): "The Problem with Vampires"
- Season Ten (2015): "Relationship Status: Complicated, Part 1"
- Season Twelve (2018): "Finale"

Angel

Drusilla appeared in 7 episodes.

- Season 2 (2000–01): "Dear Boy", "Darla", "The Trial", "Reunion", "Redefinition"
- Season 5 (2003–04): "Destiny", "The Girl in Question"

Drusilla appeared in 22 canonical issues.

- Spike (2010–11): "Alone Together Now", "Everybody Loves Spike", "You Haven't Changed a Bit", "Bedknobs and Boomsticks", "Something Borrowed", "Give and Take", "Stranger Things"
- Angel & Faith (2012): "Daddy Issues, Parts 1–4", "A Dark Place, Part 3", "Death and Consequences, Part 1"
- Angel & Faith: Season Ten (2015–16): "Those Who Can't Teach, Teach Gym, Parts 2 & 3", "A Little More than Kin, Parts 1 & 2", "A Tale of Two Families, Parts 1–5"

Drusilla appears in a number of non-canonical comics and novels, notably in her own mini-series: Spike & Dru.
