= Bad Eggs (Buffy the Vampire Slayer) =

- Buffy the Vampire Slayer episode
- Episode no.: Season 2 Episode 12
- Directed by: David Greenwalt
- Written by: Marti Noxon
- Production code: 5V12
- Original air date: January 12, 1998

Guest appearances
- Kristine Sutherland as Joyce Summers; Jeremy Ratchford as Lyle Gorch; James Parks as Tector Gorch; Rick Zieff as Mr. Whitmore; Danny Strong as Jonathan Levinson; Brie McCaddin as Cute Girl; Eric Whitmore as Night Watchman

Episode chronology
← Previous "Ted"	Next → "Surprise"
- Buffy the Vampire Slayer season 2

"Bad Eggs" is the twelfth episode of the second season of Buffy the Vampire Slayer. It was written by Marti Noxon and originally aired on The WB on January 12, 1998. Buffy must contend with the Bezoar (a prehistoric parasite) and a pair of vampire cowboys.

== Plot ==
Buffy and her mother Joyce are shopping at a mall when Buffy notices a vampire leading a girl into a closed arcade. Buffy fights off the vampire, who is later found to be a semi-notorious vampire named Lyle Gorch who travels with his brother Tector.

At school the next day, Cordelia and Xander make out in a closet, despite the fact they both continue to bicker and agree they do not want a relationship. In health class, the teacher, Mr. Whitmore asks the students to pair off to take care of an egg. That night, Buffy's egg breaks open and a tentacle emerges, attaching itself to her face and inserting a tendril into her ear.

The next morning when Buffy wakes up, the egg is back to normal, but she is feeling ill. Back at the library, Giles comments on how both Buffy and Willow appear to be very tired and sluggish, but both pass it off as a bad night's sleep. That night, a security guard enters the school basement and finds a large hole in the wall, only to be knocked unconscious by Mr. Whitmore.

Arriving home, Buffy sees her egg hatching. Suddenly a creature emerges and attempts to attach itself to her body. Buffy finally manages to stab it with a pair of scissors, before phoning Willow to warn her. Willow assures Buffy that she is fine, but her egg is seen to be already hatched. The next day, a creature is seen to have attached itself to Willow's back. Xander, who has hard-boiled his egg, decides to eat it, only to find a dead creature inside. The Scooby Gang proceed to the science lab to dissect the creature. However, Cordelia's egg hatches and the creature attaches to her, instructing her to knock Buffy unconscious, while Willow hits Xander over the head with a microscope. They drag Buffy and Xander to a closet, before joining a large group of students and teachers who pick up tools and head into the basement.

Joyce arrives at the library to pick up Buffy, but instead encounters Giles, who places a creature on her back. They both then go into the basement. Buffy and Xander regain consciousness and find two unhatched eggs in the closet. Buffy smashes them, before they go to the library. Buffy finds a book describing the creatures who attach themselves to and then control a host, under the instructions of 'the mother Bezoar', an ancient, subterranean parasite. They follow a student into the basement and through the hole, where they find the host group digging up the mother Bezoar. Buffy decides to kill the mother Bezoar. However, Lyle and Tector arrive and attack Buffy. The fight eventually ends up in the working pit, where Willow orders the others to kill them. While fending off the hosts, Tector is grabbed by a tentacle and eaten by the mother Bezoar. Buffy is also seized by a tentacle, but she manages to grab a pick-axe which she uses to kill the mother Bezoar from the inside out, thus killing the creatures and freeing the hosts, and scaring Lyle away. Joyce expresses disappointment in Buffy and tries to ground her, but Buffy later meets with Angel and they make out.

== Cultural references ==
The website Women at Warp briefly compares the parasites in "Bad Eggs" with the Star Trek: The Next Generation episode "Conspiracy" - "In both, insect-like creatures invade human hosts in service to a 'mother' parasite. Not only do each show's creatures look alike (six legs, pincers up front, tail in the back), they even attach to their victims in similar fashion, burrowing into their necks."

A scene in Buffy's bedroom in which the creature seeks to enslave her is shot as a tribute to the laboratory scene in the film “Aliens” in which the Facehugger Alien attacks Ellen Ripley and Newt.

== Critical reception ==
"Bad Eggs" received mixed reviews.

Vox ranked it at #136 of all 144 episodes on their "Every Episode Ranked From Worst to Best" list (to mark the 20th anniversary of the show), calling it "straightforward and serviceable-enough horror... But it’s also an interesting prelude to what's to come... Here, as Buffy and Angel make out in graveyards and Xander and Cordelia snark between kisses in utility closets, sex is silly and campy, but very much on the horizon."

The A.V. Club said it offered a take on the same material as the episode "Ted", with its themes about good parenting. However, they found it lighter in tone and more action-packed. It also advances the theme that sex has consequences, which relates to events later in the season when Buffy and Angel consummate their relationship.

Theresa Basile remarks that "Buffy and Xander have a moment where they're the only two people not possessed and realize they have no clue how to proceed, since the people on their team who are actually good at research and book-learning are working for the Bezoar," and that the episode subverts the conventions of the very special episode: "Any other TV show has their characters Learn Important Lessons about parenting and themselves and responsibility and all that garbage, or else pairs two antagonistic characters together and have them Find A New Appreciation for each other. But no, Buffy avoids all of those Very Important Lessons and turns the 'pretend the egg is your baby' episode into a parody of Invasion of the Body Snatchers."

Billie Doux asked, "What can you say about a sex education episode that alludes to Aliens, Invasion of the Body Snatchers, and The Wild Bunch? Answer: This should have been a much better episode." Roger Pocock called it "unimportant" and "a little too safe": "In the world of Buffy, desire is dangerous, and that has been a theme right from the start, but the dots are never quite joined with the egg-sitting thing, which is a sex-education technique that relates to the possible consequence of ending up caring for a child. But let's be realistic, here. Having children isn't the threat Buffy, Angel, Xander and Cordelia face."
