= Surprise (Buffy the Vampire Slayer) =

- Buffy the Vampire Slayer episode
- Episode no.: Season 2 Episode 13
- Directed by: Michael Lange
- Written by: Marti Noxon
- Production code: 5V13
- Original air date: January 19, 1998

Guest appearances
- Seth Green as Oz; Kristine Sutherland as Joyce Summers; Robia LaMorte as Jenny Calendar; James Marsters as Spike; Juliet Landau as Drusilla; Brian Thompson as The Judge; Eric Saiet as Dalton; Vincent Schiavelli as Uncle Enyos

Episode chronology
← Previous "Bad Eggs"	Next → "Innocence"
- Buffy the Vampire Slayer season 2

"Surprise" is episode 13 of season two of the television series Buffy the Vampire Slayer. It was written by Marti Noxon and first broadcast on The WB on January 19, 1998. "Surprise" is part one of a two-part story. Part two, "Innocence," was broadcast the next day.

== Plot ==
Buffy has a vivid dream where a very "alive" Drusilla dusts Angel, which she fears is prophetic and realizes that Spike and Drusilla may still be alive. Oz finally asks Willow out on a date. She accepts, but remembers the Scoobies are planning a surprise party for Buffy's 17th birthday and instead invites him to the party.

Elsewhere, Drusilla, strong as Buffy dreamed, arranges her own gala event, while Spike, using a wheelchair but quite "alive" as well, directs his gang to collect scattered pieces of the demon The Judge, a hoped-for ally who has the ability to burn humanity from people, to reassemble for her present.

Jenny Calendar gets a visit from her mysterious Uncle Enyos, who reveals her Gypsy past; they discuss her responsibilities ensuring that Angel continues to suffer. Enyos orders Jenny to separate Angel from the Slayer. On their way to Buffy's surprise party, Buffy and Jenny intercept a piece of the Judge and bring it to the party, deducing Drusilla's plot. Following her Gypsy orders, Jenny encourages Angel on a mission to prevent the dire consequences of reassembling the Judge – he must take the Judge's arm by cargo ship to "the remotest region possible." While Angel gives Buffy a Claddagh ring for her birthday during their tearful parting at the dock, Spike's vamps manage to steal the arm back, scrubbing the mission.

Later at the library, Buffy has another informative dream, and takes Angel to investigate Spike and Drusilla's lair at the factory. They discover the Judge is fully assembled and activated, and Spike and Drusilla capture and taunt the two, debating who will die first. They narrowly escape into the sewer system, then return to Angel's apartment exhausted and drenched from the rain. Still suffering from successive threats of losing one another, Angel and Buffy confess feelings each has been trying to suppress. They have sex for the first time and fall asleep in each other's arms. Suddenly, in a flash of lightning and a crash of thunder, Angel bolts awake and runs out into the storm, calling Buffy's name in anguish.

== Production ==
=== Filming ===
According to Buffy, the Vampire Slayer: The Watcher's Guide by Christopher Golden and Nancy Holder, filming at the docks occurred in San Pedro, California. The water was warmer than expected because of a warm El Niño current.

Sarah Michelle Gellar discussed love scenes in an interview with British newspaper The Independent in 2002:

Love scenes are never the most comfortable things in the world. The best thing about it is I have been with the same crew for six years, so they are like my family. It is a lot easier doing things you feel silly or uncomfortable about if you are around people who are that close to you - although you wouldn't want your real family to see you doing things like that! To be honest, it is truly the unsexiest thing in the world. David Boreanaz, who was one of my first boyfriends on the show, and I were the worst. We would do horrible things to each other. Like eat tuna fish and pickle before we kissed. If he had to unbutton my shirt or trousers I would pin them or sew them together to make it as hard as I could. Once I even dropped ice cream on him.

== Continuity ==
In Buffy's dream at the beginning of the episode, Willow is sitting at a table with a cappuccino and an organ grinder's monkey. She says to the monkey, "L'hippo a pique ses pantalons" ("The hippo stole his pants"). This is a back reference to Oz's jokes about animal crackers at the end of "What's My Line, Part 2." Willow must have told Buffy about the amusing incident. Also, Willow helps Buffy study for a French class in "School Hard."

Oz and Willow have their first date, commencing one of the longest relationships on the show.

Angel is transformed into Angelus, becoming the Big Bad of season 2.

Spike and Drusilla are established as worthy adversaries, allowing for Spike's eventual return appearances in seasons 3 and 4; and for his permanent placement as a regular cast member for seasons 5, 6, and 7.

Buffy's birthday gift from Angel, her Claddagh ring, not only comes to signify her lost love for the rest of season 2, but also plays an important part in the beginning of season 3: First as a resonant antecedent to Scott Hope's impromptu gift, and then as a mystical focus for Angel's return from Acathla's hell dimension.

== Broadcast ==
"Surprise" drew a viewing audience of 2.3 million households.

It was the last episode to air on a Monday in the United States. It aired on Tuesdays from the next episode onward, so the second part ("Innocence") was shown the next day. Myles McNutt explains,

"Surprise" and "Innocence" aired on back-to-back nights in January 1998, an event designed to transition the show to its new Tuesday night timeslot from its original Monday home. It's a neat sort of paratextual narrative at play here: there are often circumstances where scheduling intersects with story, like when Lost's third season was considered a creative failure based on what was largely a scheduling decision, but this is one instance where the narrative function of the episodes (to transition from one sort of dynamic to quite a different dynamic) was reinforced and even enhanced by the scheduling. It's also important to note that "Surprise" and "Innocence" don't really operate within a traditional two-part structure: while there is a cliffhanger between the two episodes, complete with a "To Be Continued..." chyron to confirm that we will be seeing the resolution of that story, the two episodes function as separate narratives.

== Reception ==
Vox ranked it at #16 out of the 144 episodes, saying that it "is the last episode of Buffy before it becomes a different show. Up until this point, it's been a smart, charming, and sharply written but also goofy and campy take on adolescence and its demons. After "Innocence," it's an immortal piece of television. "Surprise" is the episode that gets it there, and it does so with aplomb. There's an almost palpable sense of foreboding hanging over everything... It's an episode that promises everything is about to change, and while a lot of TV makes that promise, Buffy actually delivers."

Myles McNutt writes that "by merging romance with tragedy, and by turning its central character into an unwitting agent of terrifying change, Buffy moves beyond the limitations of teenage drama to something that strikes deeper into the limitations of the human condition. ... [T]he show isn't interested in drawing out the mystery of how things are going to change, but rather focused on demonstrating what has been changed, how it's been changed, and what the ramifications of this are to the series' future."

Billie Doux writes that the "symbolic dream sequences work incredibly well with the plot. Broken plates, white nightgowns, rings dropping to the floor, wonderful symbols of lost virginity."

== Notes ==
1.In "What's My Line, Part 2," Oz says to Willow, "The monkey is the only cookie animal that gets to wear clothes... Like, is the hippo going - man, where are my pants? I have my hippo dignity. And you know the monkey's just [in a French accent], 'I mock you with my monkey pants!'" He adds, "All monkeys are French."
