= Becoming (Buffy the Vampire Slayer) =

- Buffy the Vampire Slayer episodes
- Episode nos.: Season 2 Episodes 21 & 22
- Directed by: Joss Whedon
- Written by: Joss Whedon
- Production codes: 5V21; 5V22
- Original air dates: May 12, 1998 (Part 1); May 19, 1998 (Part 2)

Guest appearances
- Seth Green as Oz; Kristine Sutherland as Joyce Summers; Julie Benz as Darla (Part 1 only); Bianca Lawson as Kendra Young (Part 1 only); Jack McGee as Doug Perren; Richard Riehle as Merrick; James Marsters as Spike; Juliet Landau as Drusilla; Armin Shimerman as Principal Snyder; Max Perlich as Whistler; Robia LaMorte as Jenny Calendar (Part 2 only); James G. MacDonald as Detective Stein (Part 2 only); Shannon Welles as Gypsy Woman (Part 1 only); Zito Kazann as Gypsy Man (Part 1 only); Ginger Williams as Girl (Part 1 only); Nina Gervitz as Teacher (Part 1 only); Susan Leslie as First Cop (Part 2 only); Thomas G. Waites as Second Cop (Part 2 only)

Episode chronology
← Previous "Go Fish"	Next → "Anne"
- Buffy the Vampire Slayer season 2

"Becoming" is the two-part season finale of the second season of the drama television series Buffy the Vampire Slayer, consisting of episodes twenty-one and twenty-two. The episode aired on The WB was split into two parts, which were broadcast separately: "Part 1" first aired on May 12, 1998, and "Part 2" first aired on May 19, 1998. Both episodes were written and directed by series creator Joss Whedon.

The two episodes feature vampire slayers Buffy Summers (Sarah Michelle Gellar) and Kendra working to prevent Angelus (David Boreanaz) and fellow vampires Drusilla (Juliet Landau) and Spike (James Marsters) from awakening the demon Acathla.

== Plot ==
=== Part 1 ===
Giles visits a museum to examine a big stone block that it has just acquired; he finds an opening in the rock.

Buffy and Willow find the floppy disk containing Jenny Calendar's reconstruction of the curse that gave Angelus his soul. They are eager to attempt it so they can get Angel back. Giles warns that it will be difficult. Xander prefers to see Angelus killed rather than risk leaving him alive merely so that Buffy can have a chance to get her boyfriend back.

Drusilla kills the museum curator while Angelus and his minions steal the stone block, which contains the demon Acathla, who came to suck the world into Hell. A virtuous knight had stabbed him in the heart before he could draw a breath, but someone worthy can remove the sword to awaken Acathla. Angelus wants to use Acathla to destroy the world.

Kendra, the new Slayer, returns to Sunnydale bringing a sword blessed by the same knight who stopped Acathla.

Angelus kills a human and uses his blood in an attempt to awaken Acathla, which fails. He then lures Buffy to a battle in the cemetery. In the library, Willow is attempting to cast the curse when vampires attack. During the ensuing fight, Xander is injured, and Willow is knocked unconscious under a bookcase. Meanwhile, Drusilla hypnotizes and kills Kendra, after which she and her fellow vampires kidnap Giles. Buffy arrives too late, and a policeman finds her with Kendra's body.

==== Flashbacks ====
- Galway, Ireland, 1753: Liam, drunk as usual, is sired by Darla, becoming the sadistic vampire known as Angelus.
- London, 1860: Drusilla, a pious young woman who has unwanted visions, is psychologically tormented before being sired by Angelus.
- Romanian woods, 1898: In revenge for killing an unnamed Kalderash girl, Angelus is cursed with his human soul and becomes Angel.
- Manhattan, New York, 1996: Angel, now a derelict, meets a benevolent demon named Whistler who invites him to become a hero.
- Los Angeles, 1996: As Buffy becomes the Slayer, Whistler points her out to Angel, who is inspired "to be somebody."

=== Part 2 ===
Angelus tortures Giles for information and entertainment. Buffy finds Whistler in Giles' apartment, and they discuss Angel's reversion to Angelus. He reveals that Angel was destined to stop Acathla, not awaken him.

Buffy is nearly arrested, but Spike attacks the policeman and offers a temporary alliance. He has no wish to see the world destroyed, and is jealous of Angelus' attentions to Drusilla; he will help Buffy stop Angelus if she allows him and Drusilla to leave town. Buffy and Spike go to her house to talk, but meet Joyce. Buffy is forced to tell her about her role as a vampire slayer. Joyce tells her daughter not to come back if she leaves the house. Buffy leaves anyway.

Xander sits by the comatose Willow and confesses his love for her. She wakes up, but the first person she asks for is Oz. Willow is determined to try the curse again. She sends Xander to inform Buffy of her plans, hoping she can stall until the curse is complete.

Buffy goes to the library to retrieve Kendra's sword. She encounters Snyder, who gleefully announces that she is expelled. Spike returns to the mansion, concealing that he is well enough to walk. To keep Angelus from killing Giles, Spike suggests that Drusilla use hypnosis. She appears to Giles as Jenny, and he tells her that Angelus is the key. He must use his own blood, not someone else's, to awaken Acathla.

Buffy returns to Whistler, who tells her that if Angelus has awoken Acathla, only Angelus' blood can again defeat him, in the process sending both evil beings to hell. On her way to the mansion, she meets Xander, who decides not to pass on Willow's message.

In the mansion, Buffy announces her arrival by decapitating a minion. Spike surprises Angelus from behind, knocking him unconscious and proceeding to beat him brutally. To his dismay, Drusilla sides with her sire, defending Angelus and attacking Spike. Xander frees the injured Giles, and they escape as Spike and Buffy fight against Drusilla and the remaining minions. Angelus regains his senses and removes the sword from Acathla; he and Buffy engage in a swordfight. Spike knocks Drusilla unconscious and escapes with her in his car, leaving Sunnydale. Angelus overpowers Buffy and continues to torment her.

At the hospital, just as Willow appears close to fainting, she suddenly regains strength and begins incanting in Romanian. She succeeds in restoring Angel's soul just as Buffy is about to kill Angelus. Buffy realizes that Angel is back and embraces him. She then sees that Acathla is awake as it opens its mouth and creates an expanding vortex. When Angel, oblivious to the vortex opening behind him, questions what happened and where he is, Buffy kisses him, professes her love and then drives her sword through him into the vortex. Angel is sucked into the closing hellish vortex and the world is saved. Distraught at losing her lover, being kicked out of her home and expelled from school, and now becoming a wanted fugitive in Kendra's death, Buffy departs from Sunnydale on a bus, while her friends regroup at school, unsure if or when she will return.

== Reception ==
The score to "Becoming" won Christophe Beck a Primetime Emmy Award for Outstanding Music Composition for a Series.

Vox ranked Part 1 at #14 and Part 2 at #4 of all 144 episodes on their "Every Episode Ranked From Worst to Best" list, writing, "It's all firmly rooted in character, which is what makes each moment lead to the next with such terrible inevitability — and yet it's still difficult to believe that it will happen, that Buffy isn't going to pull some brilliant idea out of her back pocket just in the nick of time, that she is going to kill her boyfriend. When it does happen, it's devastating." Rolling Stone ranked Part 2 as the fifth-best episode of the entire series.

The Cultural Catchup Project writes that the season finale offers "a non-linear, unpredictable sort of character development which offers a nice conclusion to a non-linear, unpredictable sort of season. ... The single best thing in these episodes? Spike in Buffy's living room."

Reviewing for The A.V. Club in 2008, Noel Murray wrote that the two episodes are "a marvel, weaving together all of the season's major threads...into a concluding chapter as assured and well-realized as any in TV history."

Sarah Michelle Gellar, talking to Entertainment Weekly about her personal favorite Buffy episodes, cited this one, along with "The Body," "The Prom," and "Who Are You?" (Entertainment Weekly, "Buffy Quits," 7 March 2003). Joss Whedon listed "Becoming, Part 2" as his seventh favorite episode of the series.
