= What's My Line (Buffy the Vampire Slayer) =

- Buffy the Vampire Slayer episodes
- Episode nos.: Season 2 Episodes 9 & 10
- Directed by: David Solomon (Part 1); David Semel (Part 2)
- Written by: Marti Noxon (Part 1 and 2); Howard Gordon (Part 1)
- Production codes: 5V09 & 5V10
- Original air dates: November 17, 1997 (Part 1); November 24, 1997 (Part 2)

Guest appearances
- Seth Green as Oz; James Marsters as Spike; Juliet Landau as Drusilla; Armin Shimerman as Principal Snyder; Bianca Lawson as Kendra Young; Saverio Guerra as Willy the Snitch; Kelly Connell as Norman Pfister; Eric Saiet as Dalton; Michael Rothhaar as Suitman; P.B. Hutton as Mrs. Kalish; Danny Strong as Jonathan Levinson; Spice Williams-Crosby as Patrice

Episode chronology
← Previous "The Dark Age"	Next → "Ted"
- Buffy the Vampire Slayer season 2

"What's My Line?" is a two-episode story arc in season two of the television series Buffy the Vampire Slayer. The episode was broadcast separately and aired on The WB. Part one aired on November 17, 1997 and part two aired on November 24, 1997.

In part one, Buffy endures Career Week at school while Spike hires assassins to kill her; a fierce fighter who identifies herself as "Kendra the Vampire Slayer" shows up in Sunnydale. In part two, Angel is kidnapped by Spike for a ritual in which Drusilla is restored to health.

== Plot ==
=== Part one ===
Spike works on a cure for Drusilla. Dalton, a vampire transcriber, is unable to decipher the book stolen from the library that contains a cure. Drusilla informs Spike that they need a decryption key because the book is in code.

Buffy witnesses Dalton stealing an object from a mausoleum, but he escapes when she is distracted by another vampire. She enters her bedroom and finds Angel waiting to warn her of grave danger. Buffy reports to Giles, and he is concerned when she tells him about the theft from the mausoleum.

Spike and Drusilla examine the key stolen by Dalton, a gold cross. Spike decides to call in the Order of Taraka, an ancient guild of assassins, to rid himself of Buffy once and for all. Back at school, Willow is taken into a secluded lounge area to be recruited by a leading software company, along with Oz, the young man who has been watching her for weeks. (He also plays guitar in the band Dingoes Ate My Baby, which often performs at The Bronze.) At the mausoleum, Giles realizes that Josephus du Lac, the author of the book stolen from the library, is buried there and that the book's key was taken from the mausoleum.

A young Caribbean woman sneaks out of an airplane's cargo hold and begins to search Sunnydale for vampires and for Giles.

Giles tells Buffy, Xander, and Willow about the "du Lac Cross" which can be used as the key, and he enlists their help with further research. Buffy arrives at the ice skating stadium for a date with Angel. She is attacked, but Angel arrives in time to help her fight off the assassin, whom she kills with the blade of her skate. Angel, recognizing the assassin's ring as the symbol of the Order of Taraka, warns Buffy that she should leave Sunnydale and hide. The woman from the plane watches from the shadows.

One of Spike's hired assassins, a door-to-door beauty salesman, attacks Buffy's next-door neighbor. He feeds on the neighbor's body by disintegrating into hundreds of writhing mealworms, which can reshape themselves into limbs at will. Buffy is paranoid and jittery, suspicious of each person who passes by in the hallways at school. She arrives at Angel's empty home and falls asleep in his bed. Angel goes to Willy's bar for information, and Willy finally confirms Angel's suspicions that Spike is behind the assassins. Before Angel can leave, he is attacked by the mysterious female. She locks him in a metal cage in front of an eastern window with only a few hours until sunrise.

Giles reveals that the missing manuscript contains a ritual to restore a weakened vampire back to health. Xander and Cordelia enter Buffy's house, and Xander searches for her while Cordelia waits downstairs. She hears a knock at the door and finds a door-to-door makeup salesman. He offers free samples, and Cordelia lets him in, but it is revealed he is the mealworm assassin. In Angel's bedroom, Buffy is attacked by the mysterious woman. They fight, and the woman tells Buffy that her name is Kendra the Vampire Slayer.

=== Part two ===
Buffy and Kendra realize that they are both slayers, and they go to Giles for assistance in explaining the situation. They learn that Kendra was called when Buffy temporarily died in her fight with The Master in "Prophecy Girl". Meanwhile, Willy has saved Angel from certain death, but sold him out to Spike. Spike takes Angel back to the warehouse, where he will be held until he can be sacrificed to restore Drusilla to full strength.

Xander and Cordelia run and hide in the basement, although before long they are arguing with each other. After an unexpected kiss, they rush to escape, running past the attacking mealworm assassin. At school, Buffy, whose test results recommend a career in law enforcement, attends a career seminar. The police officer leading the seminar tries to shoot Buffy. Oz is shot and slightly injured as he pushes Willow out of harm's way. Kendra comes to Buffy's rescue, and they fight off the attacker. The Scoobies then gather in the library, where Giles announces that Spike intends for Angel to die in the ritual to restore Drusilla.

Angel is tortured by Drusilla, both emotionally and physically; she pours holy water on him as she reminds him of how he killed her whole family. Angel taunts Spike with insinuations that Spike is unable to satisfy Drusilla, in the hope that Spike will kill him before he can be used to cure Drusilla. Meanwhile, Kendra gains a newfound respect for Buffy's qualities as a slayer. Later, the slayers go after Willy to learn what happened to Angel; they force Willy to take them to the location of Spike and Angel. However, Willy leads them to the assassins, and the ritual has already begun. Buffy attacks Spike to save Angel, and Kendra and the Scooby Gang arrive to back her up. Xander and Cordelia lure the mealworm assassin underneath a door into a liquid glue trap. Willow and Giles stake a vampire while Buffy and Kendra fight several of their own. Spike starts a fire and rushes to rescue the unconscious Drusilla, hoping that the ritual has had time to cure her. Buffy prevents their exit, crushing them in falling rubble. She helps the weakened Angel exit the building.

With the danger over, it is time for Kendra to leave. Buffy and Kendra discuss their position as Slayers. Kendra remarks that Buffy considers slaying to be a job when it is actually a part of who she is. The two, now friends, say their goodbyes, and Buffy is left with a new outlook on her position as the Slayer, as well as the knowledge that she is no longer alone in her calling.

At the remains of the church, Spike lies seriously injured under the rubble. Drusilla rises, the ritual having worked and restored her to full power. She carries her partner out of the debris, promising to return the favor and make him as powerful as she.

== Continuity ==
Vox observed that the "dutiful and studious Kendra is an illuminating foil for Buffy and her more anarchic slaying style. Season three will discard Kendra to make way for Faith as a more lasting foil for Buffy, but "What’s My Line" establishes the pattern that leads to Faith, which means it's the source of one of Buffy's richest recurring plot lines."

At school, Willow joins Oz as he is opening a box of animal crackers, and he jokes about how the monkey and hippo regard each other. He tells her that the monkey is the only cookie animal that gets to wear clothes, and that all monkeys are French. They will have their first date a few episodes later, in "Surprise," during which Buffy dreams about Willow speaking French to a monkey. Willow helps Buffy study for a French class in "School Hard."

== Reception ==
Part one pulled in 3.5 million households on its original airing, while part two had an audience of 3.9 million households.

Vox rated the two parts as #54 and #55 on their "Every Episode Ranked From Worst to Best" list of the 144 episodes (to mark the 20th anniversary of the show), calling them "pleasantly goofy and charming action-filled mini movies ... not transcendent, but it's fun."

Myles McNutt writes, "By giving the villains clear motivating factors that we can understand, and that in some ways mirror Buffy's motivations in stopping them, Marti Noxon and Howard Gordon really heighten the narrative overall." Reviewer Billie Doux rates the episodes at four out of four stakes and writes, "This is the episode where the Angel/Drusilla/Spike triangle really takes off. ... Buffy sees Kendra's advent as her chance at a normal life, but later, Buffy realizes that Kendra has much less of a life than Buffy does. Perhaps this is why Buffy is more accepting of her "job" at the end of this episode."

== Notes ==
1.Oz says, "Look. Monkey. And he has a little hat. And pants. The monkey is the only cookie animal that gets to wear clothes, you know that? ... So I'm wondering, do the other cookie animals feel sort of ripped? Like, is the hippo going - man, where are my pants? I have my hippo dignity. And you know the monkey's just [in a French accent], "I mock you with my monkey pants!" And then there's a big coup in the zoo." Willow asks, "The monkey is French?" Oz replies, "All monkeys are French." Seth Green said in an Ultimate TV chat that the line "I mock you with my monkey pants" was Alyson Hannigan's idea. She had dreamed that Seth said that, and Joss Whedon decided to include it in the episode. In a DVD commentary, Marti Noxon claimed that much of the dialogue was ad-libbed by Seth and Alyson.
