= Innocence (Buffy the Vampire Slayer) =

- Buffy the Vampire Slayer episode
- Episode no.: Season 2 Episode 14
- Directed by: Joss Whedon
- Written by: Joss Whedon
- Production code: 5V14
- Original air date: January 20, 1998

Guest appearances
- Seth Green as Oz; Kristine Sutherland as Joyce Summers; Robia LaMorte as Jenny Calendar; James Marsters as Spike; Juliet Landau as Drusilla; Brian Thompson as The Judge; Ryan Francis as Soldier; Vincent Schiavelli as Uncle Enyos; James Lurie as Mr. Miller; Carla Madden as Woman; Parry Shen as Student

Episode chronology
← Previous "Surprise"	Next → "Phases"
- Buffy the Vampire Slayer season 2

"Innocence" is episode 14 of season two of Buffy the Vampire Slayer. It was written and directed by Joss Whedon and first broadcast on The WB on January 20, 1998. It is part two of a two-part story. Part 1, "Surprise," was broadcast the day before.

"Innocence" is one of the most critically acclaimed and highest rated episodes in the series, attracting 8.2 million viewers as the series moved from its Monday timeslot to Tuesday.

== Plot ==
After making love with Buffy, Angel is racked with pain as his soul is ripped from him. In the street, he kills a passer-by when she offers to help him. He goes to the factory to join Spike and Drusilla, but the Judge attacks him. It is unable to burn him because Angel has fully reverted to the evil Angelus. Spike, Drusilla, and Angelus are clearly pleased to be reunited. Angelus vows to destroy Buffy for how she made him feel when he was Angel.

While researching a way to defeat the Judge, a demon with the power to destroy the world whom "no weapon forged" can harm, Xander and Cordelia are caught kissing in the library by a jealous Willow. Buffy finds Angel in his apartment, not knowing that he is now Angelus, and he blows her off, laughing at her as she weeps. Jenny is castigated by her uncle Enyos, who tells her that if Angel has one moment of true happiness, the curse placed on him will be broken and his new soul taken from him. Angelus terrorizes Willow and the Gang at school, emotionally tormenting Buffy. Later, as they discuss Angel's transformation in the library, Buffy realises that having sex with Angel is what caused him to turn evil.

Buffy has a dream in which Angel indicates that Jenny knows more than she is letting on. The next morning, Buffy confronts Jenny, who tells her that Angelus was cursed with a soul in vengeance for what he did to her people, and that Enyos had tasked her with keeping Buffy and Angel apart. When Buffy, Jenny, and Giles arrive at Enyos' home, they find that Angelus has brutally killed him, leaving Buffy a message written in blood on the wall. Buffy begins to accept that she has to kill Angelus.

Xander, using memories from being a soldier on Halloween, hatches a plan to kill the Judge. He and Cordelia break into an army base and steal a shoulder-launched rocket. Oz declines Willow's offer to make out, as he suspects that she only wants to make Xander jealous.

Tracking down the Judge, who is slaughtering people at a crowded mall, Buffy blows him to bits with the anti-tank weapon. Buffy stalks Angelus through the fleeing crowd and, when he ambushes her, they battle ferociously. Reaching a stand-off, Buffy is still unwilling to kill Angelus and settles for kicking him in the crotch.

Buffy blames herself for everything that has happened, but Giles reassures her that although she acted rashly, she and Angel loved each other and that Giles still supports and respects her. Later, Joyce lights the candle on Buffy's birthday cake and tells her to make a wish, but Buffy decides to let it burn, while they watch the classic movie Stowaway.

== Themes ==
Myles McNutt writes that the episode depicts "a harsh reality which breaks down the show's romantic depiction of love perhaps once and for all":

This isn't entirely new, as Xander and Cordelia's relationship is a twisted sort of love driven by hate, and Giles and Jenny have gone through various hiccups where love is interrupted by near-death experiences (or, in this case, by Jenny's subterfuge regarding her family connection). But the episode is a direct hit to the series' romantic core: Willow's fantasies about Xander are shattered by walking in on the two making out in the stacks, a sort of less extreme equivalent to Angel's (or Angelus') cruelty as he takes advantage of a fragile Buffy by suggesting that he simply ran off because she wasn't good enough, or because he wasn't satisfied, or because their connection wasn't real. The latter case is obviously more traumatic, but the former is just as earth-shattering for Willow.

== Broadcast ==
"Innocence" was the highest-rated episode ever for Buffy the Vampire Slayer, scoring a 5.2 Nielsen rating and a 6.7 overnight rating, with each ratings point representing 980,000 households. It was watched by 8.2 million viewers.

== Reception ==
The two-part story won an Emmy Award for Outstanding Makeup for a Series, one of only two Emmys the series would win.

In Entertainment Weekly's list of the 25 best Whedonverse episodes — including episodes from Buffy, as well as Angel, Firefly and Dollhouse — "Innocence" placed at No. 2, with the magazine saying, "It's as primal a metaphor for the terrors of sex as one could imagine, and it showed the audience, the cast, and Whedon himself just how high his little show about dusting vampires could climb." Joss Whedon listed "Innocence" as his favorite episode of the series; the interviewer wrote, "Every girl's nightmare, and one of the show's most sly yet most powerful uses of metaphor... Though devastated, Buffy realizes that her mission is more important than her feelings."

Vox ranked it at #16 of all 144 episodes on their "Every Episode Ranked From Worst to Best" list (to mark the 20th anniversary of the show), writing, "Up until this point, it’s been a smart, charming, and sharply written but also goofy and campy take on adolescence and its demons. After "Innocence," it’s an immortal piece of television."

Reviewer Billie Doux writes that the two episodes "together are outstanding, and mark a major turning point in the series," adding, "David Boreanaz is much more impressive as Angelus than as Angel. I noticed mostly how he goes for a much lighter, more whimsical tone; good Angel is usually grim and haunted, but Angelus is playful, enthusiastic, and smiles all the time. Okay, smirks." Myles McNutt notes that "what 'Innocence' does so well is give us a clear indication of what the show will be like now that Angel has moved to the dark side. It doesn't just turn Angel into Angelus without giving us a sense of how the character will act or what his dynamic will be with Spike and Drusilla; instead, David Boreanaz is given a great deal of time to flesh out just what Angel is like without a soul..." He adds that it's "clever how the Judge was an unquestionably dominant threat but was not actually a dominant character: because it took him time to regain his power, it allowed for ... Spike, the newly returned Angelus and Drusilla to remain the clear villains of the piece. The Judge remains simply a weapon at their disposal, which fit the episode quite nicely."

Screen Rant named it an episode including some of "The Best 60 Seconds From All 7 Seasons." "The best 60 seconds of the season occur when the Judge arrives at a shopping mall and starts killing people. Buffy turns up, and he announces that no weapon can kill him. Buffy replies, "That was then, this is now," and pulls out the rocket launcher. The Judge asks what it does, and Buffy blows him into thousands of pieces."

Greta Christina wrote it like the episode "breaks with gender stereotypes by having Willow be the one who’s generally more eager for kissing and sex, and Oz being the one who wants to take things slow", also highlighting the importance of sexual consent, as Willow accepted Oz's rejection.
