= Oz (Buffy the Vampire Slayer) =

Fictional character in the supernatural fantasy television series

Daniel "Oz" Osbourne
- Oz playing at the Bronze.
- First appearance: "Inca Mummy Girl" (1997)
- Last appearance: Turbulence (2010)
- Created by: Matt Kiene; Joe Reinkemeyer
- Portrayed by: Seth Green

In-universe information
- Affiliation: Scooby Gang; Angel Investigations (ally)
- Classification: Werewolf
- Notable powers: Superhuman strength, agility and speed in werewolf form, and acute sensory perception in both states.

Daniel "Oz" Osbourne is a fictional character created by Joss Whedon for the television series Buffy the Vampire Slayer. The character is portrayed by Seth Green. Green also portrays the character in one episode of the spin-off series Angel.

In Buffy, Oz is a taciturn, guitar-playing teen who becomes Willow's (Alyson Hannigan) boyfriend. He is a recurring character in the second season who first appears in the episode "Inca Mummy Girl". He discovers he is a werewolf in the episode "Phases". Green gets elevated to main cast for the third season, and departs from the series in season 4. Green portrays the character for a final time in the season 4 finale "Restless" as part of a dream sequence. The character made a canonical return in the 2007 Buffy the Vampire Slayer Season Eight storyline "Retreat".

== Appearances ==
=== Television ===
Oz's most outstanding trait is his detached, ironic approach to life, masking a deeply philosophical interior and a very calm, devoted, gentle nature. He is also the lead guitarist for the band Dingoes Ate My Baby (a reference to the death of Azaria Chamberlain), which performs frequently at The Bronze. A high school senior, one year above Willow and the rest of the group, he is highly intelligent and "tests well", but his only real ambition lies in music.

He notices Willow in her Eskimo costume at a dance at The Bronze, and seems to be interested in her at first sight; but does not meet her directly until several episodes later. They have several dates, on one of which he witnesses a vampire being dusted by Buffy for the first time, and is unsurprised upon learning vampires exist and merely remarks that "it explains a lot". After this he becomes a member of the Scooby Gang, helping with research and fighting.

In the episode "Phases" Oz learns he has become a werewolf, turning into a monster on the three nights around a full moon, having been bitten on his finger by his cousin Jordy. On his third night as a wolf, Oz is nearly killed by werewolf hunter Gib Cain for his pelt, but is saved by Buffy and the Scooby Gang, with whose help he quickly finds a way to minimize the danger posed by the wolf: he locks himself into a cage for the appropriate nights, watched over by the Scoobies in shifts. The revelation that Oz is a werewolf does not dissuade Willow from dating him, and they become a couple.

Even though he is intelligent, several incompletes in his senior year require that he repeat it, putting him in the same graduating year as the rest of the gang. During this year, his relationship with Willow goes through rough water as he and Cordelia catch Xander and Willow kissing. They break up, but get back together again after Oz confesses he misses her ("Amends"). In the episode "Graduation Day, Part One," Oz and Willow make love before the impending confrontation with the evil Mayor Wilkins.

After graduation, he attends UC Sunnydale together with Buffy and Willow, and is seen taking 'Introduction to Psychology' by Professor Walsh along with them. Unlike the other two, he does not have a dorm room, but stays in a house off campus along with the rest of the band, and now locks himself up into a cage in a crypt at a local cemetery. Oz makes one appearance on Angel to deliver the Ring of Amarra, and plays a crucial role in the plot of that episode ("In the Dark"). He was rumored to be a recurring character in the unproduced sixth season before the show's cancellation at the end of season 5.

While appearing to the outside world to have come to terms with his lycanthropy rather easily, evidence arises he indeed is fearful of his werewolf side ("Fear, Itself"), and especially of hurting others with it. Moreover, he starts to see that he and his wolf side may not be as separate as he'd like to think. When he meets a female werewolf, Veruca, a seductive UC Sunnydale student who sings in a band, they are immediately drawn to each other, and unbeknownst to him, they meet as wolves in the woods and have sex on the first night of the full moon. Veruca, who, unlike Oz, is conscious of her state and believes they are "the wolf all the time," tries to convince Oz that they belong together. Unlike Oz, Veruca sees nothing wrong with killing humans when she is a werewolf; she feels that that is her true identity. Instead of telling the others about Veruca, he convinces her to join him in his cage on the next night they are due to turn into werewolves. They have sex again and are found the next morning lying together naked by Willow, who is devastated. Willow considers using magic to hurt Veruca, but changes her mind at the last minute. Veruca, who watched Willow, then attacks her. During the attack, Veruca transforms into a werewolf and tries to kill Willow, but Oz, also in werewolf form, protects Willow and kills Veruca. After he kills Veruca, he nearly attacks Willow, but Buffy stops him in time. Oz realizes that Veruca was correct, and tells Willow that he is, indeed, "the wolf all the time" and needs to leave in order to try to better understand his own nature.

Some months later, Oz returns to Sunnydale, having made progress with his lycanthropy through techniques learned in Tibet. He no longer uncontrollably changes into a werewolf during a full moon, and can now control his transformations, and shows Willow this when he takes her outside and shows her that the moon is full and he has not changed. However, when experiencing the powerful negative emotion of jealousy evoked by the discovery that Tara Maclay has replaced him in Willow's affections, he does change, and is seized by The Initiative and locked in their cells until Buffy, helped by Riley Finn, sets him free.

The knowledge that Willow now loves Tara makes Oz leave Sunnydale for good, though he and Willow each affirm the depth and permanence of their connection. He is last seen in Willow's dream in the episode "Restless."

=== Literature ===
In 2007, Joss Whedon launched a canonical Buffy continuation in comic format, Buffy the Vampire Slayer Season Eight. The series follows Buffy and her allies some time after the events of the television series finale. Oz initially features in a minor dream sequence in Whedon's premiere story arc, "The Long Way Home" arc amid a collage of friends and family, but is not featured in any principal role until the 2009 story arc "Retreat", written by Jane Espenson. The story sees Buffy and her army of Slayers magically transport themselves to Oz's sanctuary in Tibet to escape the pursuit of her masked enemy, the mysterious "Twilight". There, they hope to learn from Oz how to suppress their magical abilities, as he did, and therefore to avoid Twilight's detection. Oz introduces Buffy, Willow and friends to his wife Bayarmaa, who is also a werewolf, and his young son, Kelden. Oz and a number of other werewolves assist the rendered-powerless Slayers when Twilight's armed forces attack, though Oz subsequently remains with his family when Buffy and her company depart once again.

Oz also appears in Buffy Expanded Universe materials; the details offered in these appearances would later be contradicted by canonical stories, such as Espenson's arc for Season Eight. In addition to supporting roles in a number of novels and comic books, Oz is central to the comic book trade paperback Oz (2001) and the novel Oz: Into the Wild (2002). Both of these appearances are written by Christopher Golden. Into the Wild is set during Oz's quest to control his wolf-side, set after the television episode "Wild at Heart". Golden's frequent writing partner Nancy Holder also wrote the 2005 novel Queen of the Slayers, set after the events of the season 7 finale. In Queen of the Slayers, forces conspire to kill Buffy for destroying the Hellmouth in Sunnydale. When Buffy encounters Oz, he is the leader of a pack of werewolves who can completely control their wolf forms; Oz assists in the final battle of the book, set during a full moon.

== Dingoes Ate My Baby ==
Oz plays guitar in a rock band named Dingoes Ate My Baby. The name alludes to the widespread news coverage of the death of nine-week-old Azaria Chamberlain in Australia in 1980.

The only band member mentioned by name, other than Oz, is lead singer Devon MacLeish (played by Jason Hall). Devon is a friend of Oz and he also briefly dated both Cordelia Chase and Harmony Kendall.

Willow has the band's poster on her dorm room wall beginning in season 4 episode 2.

=== Buffyverse appearances ===
The band is first mentioned in the unaired Buffy pilot with a title card date of 05/03/96. Xander says, "They don’t know any actual chords yet, but they have really big amps." They did not appear on the show until the second season, in "Inca Mummy Girl," October 6, 1997. Dingoes continued to appear throughout Seasons 3 and 4 until Oz left Sunnydale. A poster of theirs is seen once afterward, in the episode Superstar. Most of their performances took place at The Bronze, Sunnydale's local nightclub.

Episode	Location	Songs
"Inca Mummy Girl"	The Bronze	"Fate" & "Shadows"
"Bewitched, Bothered and Bewildered"	The Bronze	"Pain"
"Dead Man's Party"	Buffy's House	"Never mind", "Pain" & "Sway"
"Homecoming"	The Bronze	"She knows"
"Band Candy"	The Bronze	"Violent"
"Revelations"	The Bronze	"Run"
"Living Conditions"	Buffy's dorm room	"Pain" (on stereo)
"The Harsh Light of Day"	The Bronze	"Dilate"
"The Initiative"	Frat House	"Fate" (on stereo)

=== Music ===
The music of Dingoes Ate My Baby was actually composed and performed by Four Star Mary. Most of the songs that were used on the show featured on their 1998 album, Thrown to the Wolves. The band is featured on Buffy the Vampire Slayer: The Album. They also made a one-time appearance as themselves in "Restless". They provided the music along with Christophe Beck to the Joss Whedon-written song, "Giles' Epiphany".

== Concept and creation ==
Oz originated as a temporary cast member for the show. He was based on a student with whom Buffy-creator Joss Whedon attended college, as Whedon mentions in his commentary on "Innocence" in the Season Two DVD boxed set. In the writers' original plans Oz was to be killed early in season 2 by a vampire, presumably Angelus, before this dubious honor went to Jenny Calendar. The plan changed, as shown in "Phases" when Oz's plot is expanded as he becomes a werewolf. On the season 4 featurette: Oz Revelations: A Full Moon, the writers related Oz's inner werewolf to the dark urges every person encompasses. Even Oz, being a stoic and calm persona, still had a strong and violent force inside, which became increasingly harder to control.

In several episodes during season 4, Oz can be seen wearing a sheepskin jacket, alluding to the Aesopian fable, origin of the well-known phrase "a wolf in sheep's clothing".
