= Sunnydale =

Fictional city from the TV series Buffy the Vampire Slayer

- Buffy the Vampire Slayer location
- The "Welcome to Sunnydale" sign
- Created by: Joss Whedon

In-universe information
- Type: Fictional city
- Locations: Sunnydale High School; The Bronze; The Magic Box; UC Sunnydale
- Characters: Buffy Summers; Rupert Giles; Xander Harris; Willow Rosenberg; Cordelia Chase; Angel; Daniel "Oz" Osbourne; Spike; Riley Finn; Anya Jenkins; Dawn Summers; Tara Maclay

Sunnydale is the fictional setting for the American television drama Buffy the Vampire Slayer (1997–2003). The series creator Joss Whedon conceived the town as a representation of a generic Californian city, as well as a narrative parody of the all-too-serene towns typical in traditional horror films.

Sunnydale is located on a "Hellmouth"; a portal "between this reality and the next", and convergence point of mystical energies.

== Environment ==
=== Sunnydale itself ===
Sunnydale's size and surroundings are implausible but justified given its origins — to sustain a human population for supernatural evils to prey upon. The town's founder spared no expense to attract a populace, and Sunnydale thus contains many elements of a large city — which the show's writers utilized fully for comic effect and narrative convenience. During the first three seasons, Sunnydale is shown to have 38,500 inhabitants, very few high schools, forty-three churches, a small private college, a zoo, a museum, and one modest main street. Even so, it has twelve gothic cemeteries. These cemeteries are so heavily used that services are sometimes held at night. Sunnydale is divided into five neighborhoods. The first is the entertainment district which contains the Bronze, Sunnydale's nightclub, which attracts some well-known artists despite a clientele consisting mainly of high-school kids. The second consists of the alleys directly behind Bronze, housing the town's surplus supply of pallets and cardboard. The high school makes up the third neighborhood. The fourth neighborhood is entirely occupied by a large graveyard, and finally, the suburban residential sprawl forms the last neighborhood. The prevalence of very nice homes is made possible by low property values resulting from frequent murders.

In later seasons it is revealed that Sunnydale contains a campus of the University of California system, as well as a profitable magic supply shop. The town is also seen to include a large park containing a creek and a lake, and one of its cemeteries is shown to be adjacent to a lake. Sunnydale has a number of parks: Weatherly Park, Glebe Park, Radcliff Park and Nelson Park are just some of the examples.

Sunnydale has a train station, a bus station, a small airport, and a small military base. There is also a seaport with a harbor deep enough to allow the docking of coastal freighters.

Directly beneath Sunnydale High School is a Hellmouth, a subterranean, mystical portal that attracts evil forces. This functions as a major plot device in Buffy the Vampire Slayer, as it explains why vampires and other demons are so prevalent in Sunnydale. Also beneath the school is a small pool of sea water with an outlet to the Pacific Ocean.

Sunnydale exhibits many common horror-movie characteristics, including an abundance of dark alleyways, abandoned mansions, and factories. The adult population is either clueless or perpetually in denial, in stark contrast to the demon-fighting, supernaturally aware teens.

By the show's seventh season, set in 2002–03, the city's population had fallen to 32,900. In the spring, the town was almost completely evacuated.

=== Sunnydale's surroundings ===
Sunnydale is somewhat isolated.

The town is situated near several acres of woods and forest, including Miller's Woods. Breaker's Woods is a 45-minute drive from town.

Sunnydale is located on or near the Pacific Ocean. An ocean port with several docked ships is nearby. Kingman's Bluff stands on a tall cliff overlooking the sea. There is a beach not too far away.

Close to or in Sunnydale is an old quarry house built beside a deep lake, located a few feet from a cliff edge. In addition, there is a hydroelectric dam in the vicinity of Sunnydale.

Within a day's drive of Sunnydale is a desert. It is stated several times that Sunnydale is approximately two hours' drive north of Los Angeles.

In the final episode of Buffy the Vampire Slayer ("Chosen"), and also in the first issue of the Buffy: Season Eight comic book, Sunnydale is depicted being surrounded by desert terrain.

The episode "Pangs" reveals that Sunnydale is in the former homeland of the Chumash people, which is the area northwest of Los Angeles, centered on Santa Barbara County. The episode references a lost Spanish mission, which might be a reference to a historical mission originally located near Point Conception which was destroyed by an earthquake and relocated inland.

The episode "Shadow" (5.08) contains a telephone directory ad for the Magic Box, which uses an 805 area code. This would indicate that Sunnydale is located in Santa Barbara County, or possibly Ventura County or San Luis Obispo County (all are along the coast north of Los Angeles but south of Monterey).

=== Maps of Sunnydale ===
Maps of Sunnydale have appeared at various times during the show:

- A large map of "Sunnydale County" hangs on the wall of Principal Snyder's office and also on the wall of Mayor Wilkins' office. This is actually a map of Santa Barbara County, California with the words "Sunnydale County" superimposed on it. According to this map, Sunnydale is located at a bend on the California coast. To the south and west of Sunnydale is the Pacific Ocean. Joss Whedon stated in November 1998 that "Sunnydale is in fact near Santa Barbara."
- Giles uses a street map of Santa Barbara as a map of Sunnydale when he is plotting sightings of the Initiative commandos in the series' fourth season.
- A street map of central Sunnydale is used by the Scooby Gang twice in the seventh season.
- In the seventh season, Andrew draws a map of Sunnydale to track the First's activities. The general shape of the coastline matches the map used in season three. According to Andrew's map, there are woods between Sunnydale and the ocean to the west and to the south, and directly southeast of the town, at the location where the coast bends, there is a dark forest. There are also woods to the east of Sunnydale, as well as railroad tracks.

=== Filming locations ===
Various southern California locations are used as stand-ins for Sunnydale:

- The exterior shots, as well as some interior shots, of Buffy's home are of an actual residence located in Torrance.
- The exterior shots of Sunnydale High School (seasons 1–3) are of Torrance High School in Torrance, California.
- The exterior shots of The Crawford Street Mansion (seasons 2–3) are of Frank Lloyd Wright's Ennis House in Los Feliz near Griffith Park.
- Most of the University of California, Sunnydale scenes (season 4) were filmed at the University of California, Los Angeles, and in a closed sound stage designed to match the UCLA architecture. Some of the later scenes were filmed at a private business park.
- The exterior shots of Sunnydale City Hall is the Iowa Courthouse Building, an office building in Torrance.
- The exterior shots of New Sunnydale High School (season 7) were filmed at California State University, Northridge in Northridge, California.

== History ==
=== Prior to Buffy's arrival ===
Long before humans settled the area, a Hellmouth existed at the site of the future town of Sunnydale.

In ancient times, a magic scythe was used at the site of the Hellmouth "to kill the last pure demon that walked upon the Earth." After this, the scythe was hidden, and its last guardian remained, waiting in a pagan temple that would somehow remain unnoticed for centuries.

Centuries later, the Navajo and Chumash peoples lived in this area along with one or more groups of monks and friars who also settled there. As in general Californian history, these friars are assumed to have been Spanish Franciscans, who arrived in California in the late 18th century. In 1812, there was an earthquake in the Sunnydale region that caused a cave-in during which an entire mission was lost; the very existence of the mission was soon forgotten. (The Mission La Purísima Concepción, originally sited near Point Conception and relocated to Lompoc would fit this description.)

Richard Wilkins arrived in California in the late 19th century, looking for gold. He founded Sunnydale (after considering the alternate names "Happydale" and "Sunny Acres") in a demon infested valley after a Navajo Slayer died there in 1899. He made a pact with the demons to found a town atop the Hellmouth for them "to feed on", in return for the promise of immortality by becoming a pure demon himself. Wilkins became Mayor of Sunnydale.

In the 1930s, there was at least one more major earthquake in Sunnydale. This caused a cave-in that swallowed up the Master and his lair, as well as the Satanist temple on Kingman's Bluff. (The date of this earthquake is given as either 1932 or 1937, although it is possible these were two distinct quakes.)

Sometime in the 1980s or 1990s, Richard Wilkins was again elected mayor, now under the name of "Richard Wilkins III", and served more than one term.

By the 1990s, Sunnydale appeared to have become a typical town on the California coast, with a popular mayor, a police force that Principal Snyder describes as "deeply stupid," and a local newspaper (the Sunnydale Press). However, Mayor Wilkins had instructed the police to cover up any supernatural or mysterious violence occurring in the city and had directed Principal Snyder to conceal supernatural violence occurring at Sunnydale High.

==== Mystic artifacts ====
At some point in Sunnydale's history, the following mystic artifacts were hidden throughout the town's cemeteries and perhaps elsewhere:

- the du Lac Cross (found in "What's My Line, Part One")
- some, but not all, of the scattered remnants of the Judge (found and reassembled in "Surprise"); other pieces were found elsewhere and shipped to Sunnydale
- the Glove of Myhnegon (found in "Revelations")
- the Amulet of Balthazar (found in "Bad Girls")
- the Gem of Amara (found in "The Harsh Light of Day")

=== During the series ===
The series begins when Buffy Summers, the current vampire slayer, moves to 1630 Revello Drive, and begins attending Sunnydale High School. There she meets new friends, including Willow Rosenberg, Xander Harris, and her new watcher, Rupert Giles. This "Scooby Gang", eventually including popular cheerleader Cordelia Chase and Willow's boyfriend Oz, often hangs out at the Bronze, the Espresso Pump (a local coffee house with a retro gas station motif) and the Sun Cinema. Buffy's mother, Joyce, works in an art gallery in Sunnydale. (It is not clear whether or not she owns the gallery.)

During their time in high school, Buffy and her friends fight a number of vampires, most notably the Master, Angel, a vampire with a soul, who fell in love with Buffy; Spike, Drusilla, and Angelus (when Angel had lost his soul). Another slayer, Faith, arrives in their senior year of high school (season 3) and lives at the Downtowner Motel until she joins forces with Mayor Wilkins.

In the third season episode "The Wish", Cordelia angrily wishes that Buffy Summers had never arrived in Sunnydale, and her wish is granted by vengeance demon Anyanka. Cordelia finds herself in an alternate universe where The Master has risen to the surface and completely taken over the town, with the surviving human population living in terror of the vampires. The school is sparsely populated; curfews are strict; humans wear crosses and drab colors to avoid attracting vampires; and almost all of the people she knew are either dead or have been turned into vampires.

At the end of the third season (June 1999), Sunnydale High School is destroyed in a great conflict that kills Mayor Wilkins and Principal Snyder. After this point, there is no mention in the television show of the political leaders of the city. The police occasionally appear, but the police chief does not. There is no further discussion of the police covering up supernatural evidence, although one newspaper headline suggests this may have continued.

As the fourth season begins (fall 1999), Buffy and Willow begin attending the University of California, Sunnydale. There they discover that the United States government was operating a "black" (secret) military unit, The Initiative, and has a laboratory and demon confinement complex in a cavern beneath the UC Sunnydale campus. The Initiative is closed down at the end of the season (spring 2000) after a climactic battle with the cyborg Adam. By this time, Tara Maclay and Anya have been added to the Scooby Gang. Later this same year, Giles purchases a magic shop named The Magic Box.

Sometime between the fourth and fifth seasons (during the summer of 2000), the mysterious "Key" is transformed into Buffy's younger "sister", Dawn Summers and the evil goddess Glory arrives in the town, leading to an increase in the number of mentally ill patients due to her ability to suck the sanity from their brains to maintain her own. The next year brings the deaths of Joyce Summers and Buffy herself (although Buffy is returned from the grave by a magic spell cast by Willow). After this point, Buffy and Dawn become co-owners of the family house.

Before Season 5's end, a scene in the city would be shown at least once in the second season of Buffy's spinoff, Angel. In the episode "Disharmony", Cordelia Chase calls Willow from Los Angeles when her high school friend Harmony Kendall turns up. We see Willow's side of this call in a rare Sunnydale scene for this series. Angel himself returns to Sunnydale at least four times in Buffy seasons 4, 5 and 7.

At the end of the sixth season (spring 2002), the Magic Box is demolished in a battle between Willow and Buffy. At the beginning of the seventh season (fall 2002), Sunnydale High School was rebuilt on the same location as before — directly over the Hellmouth.

By this time, knowledge of supernatural phenomena seems to be slowly growing in the town. Sunnydale's population is also revealed to have dropped to 32,900.

In the second half of the seventh season (early 2003), supernatural manifestations at Sunnydale High reach unprecedented levels. Within less than a month, virtually the entire population of the town flees in a mass evacuation. Soon thereafter, the cataclysmic showdown between the Scooby Gang, the Potential Slayers Buffy has gathered together, and the First Evil results in the complete obliteration of the town. Sunnydale collapses into a giant pit, closing the entrance to the Hellmouth.

During the weeks between the series finale of Buffy and the Season 5 premiere of Angel, Lindsey McDonald makes an off-screen trip to the crater and digs up the amulet worn by Spike in the final battle. He sends it to Angel at Wolfram & Hart where it releases an incorporeal Spike. The destruction of the city is mentioned several times during Angel's final season, mainly tying into Spike's brief ghostly status. It is seen one more time when a military general oversees the crater in Season 8. The destruction of the town has also led the U.S. government to brand the Scooby Gang and their Slayers an international terrorist group.

In the final arc of Season 8, the Scooby Gang return to the ruins of Sunnydale to secure the Seed of Wonder, an artifact that is the source of all magic on Earth, and serves as a battleground between themselves and a massive legion of extra-dimensional demons.
