= Spiral (Buffy the Vampire Slayer) =

- Buffy the Vampire Slayer episode
- Episode no.: Season 5 Episode 20
- Directed by: James A. Contner
- Written by: Steven S. DeKnight
- Production code: 5ABB20
- Original air date: May 8, 2001

Guest appearances
- Amber Benson as Tara Maclay; Clare Kramer as Glory; Charlie Weber as Ben; Wade Andrew Williams as General Gregor; Karim Prince as Dante; Justin Gorence as Orlando; Lily Knight as Gronx; Jack Donner as Cleric #1; Bob Morrisey as Crazy #1; Paul Bates as Crazy #2; Carl J. Johnson as Crazy #3; Mary Sheldon as Nurse

Episode chronology
← Previous "Tough Love"	Next → "The Weight of the World"
- Buffy the Vampire Slayer season 5

"Spiral" is the 20th episode of season 5 of the television series Buffy the Vampire Slayer. The episode aired on The WB on May 8, 2001.

The premise of Buffy the Vampire Slayer is that an adolescent girl, Buffy Summers, is chosen by mystical forces and given superhuman powers to kill vampires, demons, and other evil creatures in the fictional town of Sunnydale.

== Plot ==
With the god Glory now possessing knowledge that Dawn is the Key, Buffy and Dawn narrowly escape and gather with the rest of their friends in Xander's apartment to discuss possible plans of action, where Buffy surprises everyone by declaring that they will never be able to defeat Glory and the only way to stay alive is to leave Sunnydale, to which the group reluctantly agrees. Spike provides a sun-protected Winnebago for their transportation and Buffy allows him to accompany them. Though Giles and Xander are displeased by this, Buffy informs them that she and Spike are now the only ones who stand a chance at protecting Dawn in the event that Glory catches up to them.

Ben talks to one of Glory's minions, who reminds him that he is just a human body encasing Glory's god form and that upon her full rejuvenation, he will die; Ben states that he will do anything with his power to keep himself alive, even destroying the Key (whom he knows to be Dawn). The Knights of Byzantium retrieve their insane member from the hospital, who babbles that the Key is the Slayer's sister; their General, Gregor, orders the Knights to assemble for battle.

Giles, driving the RV, talks with Xander about Buffy's state of mind. Depressed and worried about their plans, Buffy is comforted by Dawn until the Knights attack, surprising everyone but Buffy, who had never told the Scoobies about her earlier encounter with the Knights. A sword through the roof nearly kills Buffy, but Spike stops it with his bare hands. While Buffy battles the Knights from the top of the RV, one knight impales Giles with a thrown spear, causing the RV to crash onto its side. The Scoobies rush to an abandoned gas station, where Buffy fends off a siege by the Knights until Willow erects a barrier spell; Gregor, having fallen during the siege, is also contained in Willow's force field with the others, making him an unanticipated prisoner of war. Meanwhile, at the hospital, all those left unstable by Glory repeatedly mutter, "It's time." Spike suggests to Xander that they run, with some (notably himself) sacrificing their lives so the others can escape, but Buffy refuses to let anyone die.

Buffy interrogates Gregor, and he gives them new information about Glory: One of Glory's fellow hell gods that ruled over one of the more horrific demon dimensions attacked first, fearing her lust for power would drive her to seize the dimension for her own. After emerging victorious from the bloody war that ensued, but unable to destroy her, the other gods banished Glory to Earth. The magic which would allow Glory to return to her dimension was embodied in the Key, which the Knights sought to destroy but which a sect of monks instead concealed from both Glory and the Knights, hoping to eventually use the Key's power for good. In the intervening years, both Glory and the Knights have hunted for the monks and the Key, but Glory ultimately found the monks first. Before their deaths, the monks converted the Key into the form of Dawn, confident Buffy would protect her. The Knights, arriving too late to prevent the monks' deaths, remained in Sunnydale, where they, like Glory, sought to wrest the Key from Buffy's control. Glory's goal is to use Dawn's blood in a ritual to open a portal, allowing her to return to her home dimension and reclaim power.

Gregor further explains that the portal will dissolve the boundaries between dimensions, causing the collapse of reality; Glory is aware of these facts, Gregor adds, but she will allow such chaos so long as she can return home. The Knights are acting to prevent this by killing Dawn and preventing the portal from opening. Gregor also informs Buffy that, upon Glory's banishment, she was bound to a now-adult human male, who has served as her host body ever since and whose identity is unknown; if that man is killed while in mortal form, then Glory will also perish and, without the threat of Glory's ritual, Dawn herself will pose no further danger to the dimensional boundaries. Although shaken by these revelations, Buffy remains dedicated to protecting Dawn's life and defeating Glory before she can use Dawn in her ritual.

Buffy allows Ben into the gas station so he can provide needed medical care to Giles. Gregor tries to tempt Ben into killing Dawn. Glory takes over Ben's body. Exuberant that Ben has "finally [done] something right," she kills Gregor, fights off the Scooby Gang to take Dawn, and bursts through the forcefield. Glory disposes of all the Knights and disappears with Dawn. Everyone heads for Ben's car to chase after Glory. Unable to process these events, Buffy suffers a nervous breakdown and collapses into a state of shock.
