= The Weight of the World (Buffy the Vampire Slayer) =

- Buffy the Vampire Slayer episode
- Episode no.: Season 5 Episode 21
- Directed by: David Solomon
- Written by: Doug Petrie
- Production code: 5ABB21
- Original air date: May 15, 2001

Guest appearances
- Clare Kramer as Glory; Charlie Weber as Ben; Dean Butler as Hank Summers; Lily Knight as Gronx; Bob Morrisey as Crazy #1; Amber Benson as Tara Maclay; Joel Grey as Doc; Kristine Sutherland as Joyce Summers; Todd Duffey as Murk; Alexandra Lee as Young Buffy; Paul Bates as Crazy #2; Carl J. Johnson as Crazy #3; Matthew Lang as High Priest Minion

Episode chronology
← Previous "Spiral"	Next → "The Gift"
- Buffy the Vampire Slayer season 5

"The Weight of the World" is episode 21 of season 5 of the television series Buffy the Vampire Slayer. The episode aired on May 15, 2001 on The WB.

In this episode, Willow tries to reach the Slayer, who has been rendered catatonic by Dawn's abduction. Meanwhile, the boundaries separating Ben and Glory begin to dissolve, and Glory is forced to deal with human emotion.

The premise of Buffy the Vampire Slayer is that an adolescent girl, Buffy Summers, is chosen by mystical forces and given superhuman powers to kill vampires, demons, and other evil creatures in the fictional town of Sunnydale.

== Plot ==
Glory prepares for the ritual to open the portal, talking to her minions and Dawn, who is tied up and gagged on a chair. Spike reports that he cannot see Glory anywhere, but the gang has a new problem as Buffy has been reduced to a state of catatonia. Spike tries to violently shake Buffy back to normal, which only leads to a fight with Xander, and Willow forces them apart with magic. Willow takes command and quickly formulates a plan with both Buffy and Giles incapacitated: the Scoobies are to return to Sunnydale, with Xander taking Giles to the hospital, Anya looking after Tara, and Spike tracking down Glory while Willow helps Buffy. After mentioning that Ben and Glory share a body, Spike realizes that Glory's magic makes the humans forget that bit of information every time it is revealed to them.

Glory first attempts to comfort a frightened Dawn, but starts to lose her cool as she realizes she is feeling guilty. Dawn reveals to Glory that she remembers the transformation from Ben; this really worries Glory, as it implies Ben is closer to the surface than before. She asks to have Ben taken out of her body, but it is the punishment she must face for her crime.

With Anya looking after Tara, Willow performs a spell to enter the mind of the Slayer, where she finds herself talking to Buffy as a child. Willow witnesses Buffy's memory of baby Dawn being brought home by their parents Joyce and Hank. In Buffy's mind, Willow watches a now adult Buffy shelve a book at the magic shop, followed by Buffy's memory of the First Slayer telling her that "death is [her] gift". At her house, Buffy calmly acknowledges that death is her gift, before going to Dawn's room and smothering the young girl with a pillow, much to Willow's horror. In Buffy's mind, the remembered scenes repeat endlessly.

At the hospital where Giles is getting care, Xander fills him in on Willow's plans. Spike reports that Glory has left her apartment. Spike and Xander visit Doc for information on Glory but, noticing his shifty attempts to hide a small carved box, quickly find that he is playing for the other team. With his super speed and long tongue, Doc throws the box into the fireplace and attacks the men. Spike is able to recover the box while Xander stabs the reptilian creature with a sword. Thinking that the creature is dead, the two leave with the box, but after they have gone, Doc awakens.

Glory becomes Ben, who flees with Dawn. A good distance away from Glory's hideout, Dawn breaks away from Ben and knocks him out with a chain; but this only allows Glory to re-emerge. Ben and Glory battle for control of the body until Glory strikes up a deal: if Ben cooperates in sacrificing Dawn, Glory will grant him immortality and an independent existence from her. Out of self-preservation, Ben agrees, and hands Dawn over to Glory's minions.

In Buffy's mind, before Buffy can go to kill Dawn again, Willow stops her and asks her about the significance of the seemingly mundane scene of placing a book on a shelf. Buffy explains that was the exact moment when, in her heart, she gave up hope of defeating Glory. Buffy blames herself because she thinks that she is the reason Glory has Dawn and Dawn will soon die. Willow tells her that it is not over yet and she can still do something to stop it. Buffy then returns to reality, crying and collapsing into Willow's arms.

As they return to the magic shop, Xander tells Buffy that Ben and Glory are one and the same. After reviewing the information Spike stole from Doc, Giles reveals that a bloodletting ceremony will occur to open the portal, and once it begins there is only one way to stop it: Dawn must be killed.
