= Tough Love (Buffy the Vampire Slayer) =

- Buffy the Vampire Slayer episode
- Episode no.: Season 5 Episode 19
- Directed by: David Grossman
- Written by: Rebecca Rand Kirshner
- Production code: 5ABB19
- Original air date: May 1, 2001

Guest appearances
- Clare Kramer as Glory; Charlie Weber as Ben; Troy T. Blendell as Jinx; Anne Betancourt as Principal Stevens; Leland Crooke as Professor Lillian; Amber Benson as Tara Maclay; Todd Duffey as Murk; Alan Heitz as Slook

Episode chronology
← Previous "Intervention"	Next → "Spiral"
- Buffy the Vampire Slayer season 5

"Tough Love" is episode 19 of season 5 of the television series Buffy the Vampire Slayer. The episode aired on The WB on May 1, 2001. Buffy withdraws from school in order to better look after Dawn, who has been skipping school and shirking her responsibilities since her mother's death. Buffy assumes a new role as head of household. Willow and Tara quarrel, and while they are separated Glory "feeds" on Tara's mind, rendering her mentally unstable. In a vengeful rage, Willow storms after Glory, but fails to defeat her.

The premise of Buffy the Vampire Slayer is that an adolescent girl, Buffy Summers, is chosen by mystical forces and given superhuman powers to kill vampires, demons, and other evil creatures in the fictional town of Sunnydale. She is supported by a close circle of family and friends, nicknamed the Scooby Gang.

== Plot ==
Buffy notifies her poetry professor that she is dropping out of college so that she may take care of Dawn. Dawn and Buffy are called into Dawn's principal's office where Buffy is informed that Dawn has been skipping school. Buffy seeks Giles's advice about being Dawn's mother figure and then takes her sister home, warning Dawn that her behavior in school needs to improve or Buffy could possibly lose guardianship of her.

Ben is fired from his job at the hospital, as Glory has been monopolizing the human form they share and he has not shown up for work in two weeks. Glory takes a bath while she demands that her blindfolded minions tell her everything they know about the Key. Glory's minions provide her with enough information to conclude who the Key is and Glory leads the way to gather it.

Meanwhile, Tara and Willow discuss their relationship and Willow's powers as a witch, but the discussion ends up angering Willow when Tara expresses her concerns about Willow's "frightening" powers. Depressed over her first major fight with Willow, Tara goes to a cultural fair, but finds herself sitting next to Glory on a park bench. Giles finds one of Glory's minions at the shop and questions him about Glory's plans. Willow goes after Tara who is in Glory's grasp, but cannot reach her in time. Glory discovers that Tara is not the Key, and offers to let her go if she reveals the key's identity. Protecting Dawn, Tara refuses, and Glory drains Tara's mind of sanity.

At the hospital, doctors look after Tara while Willow plans her vengeance against Glory. Buffy arranges for Dawn to be kept safe by Spike in some caves while she takes care of the issues involving Tara. Blaming herself for all of the harm that Glory has caused the people of Sunnydale, particularly Spike and Tara, Dawn tearfully expresses a belief that she is evil and a "lightning rod for pain", while Spike comforts her and tries to convince her otherwise. Willow rages, going to the magic shop to gather dangerous magic supplies in preparation for her attack on Glory. Buffy thinks she has talked Willow out of any attempts to go after Glory, but Spike convinces her that one cannot be talked out of something like that.

At Glory's place, Willow makes an unexpected, but grand appearance, casting spells wildly, all in attempts to attack and destroy Glory. Although she manages to use a lightning strike to cause Glory some pain (something no one else, not even Buffy, was able to do), subsequent assaults have no effect; the goddess is far more powerful than the witch, and Willow is almost seriously wounded once her strength fades. Luckily, Buffy shows up in time to stop her from getting hurt. Buffy and Glory battle ferociously, until one of Willow's force fields allows Willow and Buffy to escape. The next day, Willow, Tara, Buffy, and Dawn sit down to eat. Willow spoon-feeds applesauce to Tara, who is still unstable after Glory's attack, while discussing the responsibilities she has to undertake in order to take care of Tara. When all seems peaceful, Glory makes a surprise appearance, tearing out an entire wall. Tara, distressed, describes Dawn as having "pure" energy, revealing that Dawn is the key.
