= The Gift (Buffy the Vampire Slayer) =

- Buffy the Vampire Slayer episode
- Episode no.: Season 5 Episode 22
- Directed by: Joss Whedon
- Written by: Joss Whedon
- Production code: 5ABB22
- Original air date: May 22, 2001

Guest appearances
- Clare Kramer as Glory; Charlie Weber as Ben; Amber Benson as Tara Maclay; Joel Grey as Doc; Todd Duffey as Murk; Craig Zimmerman as Minion #1; Josh Jacobson as Teen; Tom Kiesche as Vampire

Episode chronology
| ← Previous "The Weight of the World" | Next → "Bargaining" |
- Buffy the Vampire Slayer season 5

"The Gift" is the season 5 finale, and the 100th episode, of the fantasy-horror television series Buffy the Vampire Slayer (1997–2003). The episode aired on The WB on May 22, 2001. The episode serves as the "WB Finale" of the series, as it moved to the UPN network for the remainder of the series.

In "The Gift", Buffy refuses to accept that her sister Dawn's death is the only way to defeat the hell-god Glory and prepares to do battle. In the end, she discovers the meaning of her "gift".

== Plot ==
The Scooby Gang considers plans to foil Glory, but can only suggest killing Buffy's sister Dawn before Glory uses her in the ritual, which Buffy refuses to consider. Anya suggests using the Dagon Sphere, which repels and confuses Glory, and the hammer of Olaf the Troll. They hope to delay Glory until her deadline for completing the ritual has passed, preventing an apocalypse and making Dawn useless to her.

As Buffy trains with Giles, she reveals to him that the First Slayer told her, on her vision quest (in "Intervention"), that death was her gift, an idea she rejects. Buffy also notes that while she survived killing Angel despite loving him, after the loss of her mother she knows losing Dawn will destroy her.

Meanwhile, Xander proposes to Anya. At first, she is upset, believing that he is doing it just because the world will end, but after he reassures her that he wants to see the world safe because he truly wants to spend the rest of his life with her, she agrees to accept if they survive. As Buffy and Spike gather weapons, she asks him to protect Dawn. Spike tells Buffy he knows she will never love him, but is grateful that she treats him like a man rather than a monster.

Glory's minions build a tower for the ritual to open the gates between dimensions. Buffy and her allies confront Glory just as the ritual is to begin. Willow launches a magic attack, confusing and dazing Glory, while restoring Tara's sanity. Buffy attacks Glory with the Dagon Sphere, but Glory manages to destroy it. As they fight, Glory punches off her head, revealing she has been actually fighting Buffy's robot double. Buffy surprises Glory by attacking her with Olaf's hammer, and then races to save Dawn, but Glory slows her down as they battle on the tower. The two of them fall to the ground below, where Xander uses a crane to hit Glory with a wrecking ball, making Glory bleed. Buffy beats Glory with the hammer until she reverts to Ben, but spares his life, telling him that Glory must never return or they will both die. With the others' attention diverted, Giles dispassionately kills Ben by suffocating him, to prevent Glory's re-emergence.

With the window of time to stop the ritual about to close, the Scoobies spot someone up on the scaffolding with Dawn. Willow telepathically tells Spike to go up to Dawn, and she and Tara magically clear a path for him by throwing aside Glory's minions and guards. Spike finds the demon Doc threatening to start the ritual. A fight ensues, but Doc tosses Spike off the scaffolding and then cuts Dawn with shallow slashes that bleed steadily, starting the apocalyptic ritual. Buffy reaches the top, pushes Doc off and frees the captive Dawn just as the portal between dimensions opens. Dawn is willing to sacrifice herself to seal the portal, but Buffy, comprehending the true meaning of the First Slayer's revelation, stops her. Realizing that since Dawn has her blood and that her own death can stop the ritual, Buffy decides to sacrifice herself instead, and says goodbye to Dawn, urging her to be brave and live her own life. Buffy throws herself into the portal, which closes when she dies, leaving her friends devastated. She is buried with the epitaph, "She saved the world. A lot."

== Development ==
Written by Joss Whedon, the episode was originally conceived as the series finale. After its airing, the series was left "in limbo" before its network changed to UPN for its final two seasons.

== Themes ==
The episode's title encapsulates its central theme. Buffy's ultimate sacrifice to close a hellish portal highlights the loss of her support system, including her mother and her mentor, Giles. This act thrusts her into a world where the weight of her unique role as the Slayer becomes overwhelming. The episode signifies the end of the comparatively lighter tone in the series, as Buffy grapples with the ramifications of her destiny.

One of the significant developments in the episode is the evolution of the character Spike. He transitions from a tolerated danger to a multifaceted ally. Spike's love for Buffy and his commitment to protecting Dawn marks a substantial shift in his character arc, and this growth continues over the subsequent seasons, leading to a profound exploration of humanity and redemption.

The episode also foreshadows the darkness within Willow, a character known for her endearing qualities. Willow harnesses powerful dark magic and telepathy to protect her friends, signaling her capacity for wielding darker forces. This transformation sets the stage for her eventual descent in the next season, a contentious plotline that explores the consequences of unchecked magical power.

Giles, typically portrayed as a mild-mannered librarian and Buffy's guardian, reveals a darker side in the episode when he kills Ben, as he believes it is his duty as a Watcher. His complex identity, somewhere between a friend and a father figure, adds depth to his character. In an essay on the ownership of evil, Erma Petrova argues that Giles murdering Ben is comparable to Willow murdering Warren (in "Villains"): both victims are human, but their deaths are necessary to prevent further suffering. Although the moral ambiguity of killing Ben is discussed earlier in the episode, as well as Ben's innocence ("I know he's an innocent, but ... not like 'Dawn' innocent"), Giles is never shown to have feelings of guilt afterwards, because he did what needed to be done. Contrast this with Willow's guilt over murdering Warren in a spirit of revenge, a theme that persists until the end of the series. Petrova feels the difference for Giles is that killing Ben is his only option - the police wouldn't understand the danger, Buffy is morally unable to take a human life, and leaving him alive is too great a risk. In contrast, Willow had other options available, yet chose to murder Warren anyway. Giles recognizes that Buffy, as a hero, lives by a more demanding moral code than most people. Her unique role and abilities confer special responsibilities, including moral rules by which Giles is not bound. When Ben marvels, "She could have killed me", Giles disagrees: "No, she couldn’t. Never... She’s a hero, you see. She’s not like us." However, in an essay on the ethics in this episode, C. W. Marshall claims that Giles actually exhibits heroism, as his murder of Ben serves a greater good and protects those he loves.

== Reception ==
Rachel Simon of Vulture thought the episode marked a pivotal moment in the series, concluding the lauded season on an "indisputable high note" that explored character arcs and themes, and serving as a launching point for significant changes for the last two seasons, including a darker and more complex storytelling approach. She also praised Sarah Michelle Gellar's performance as Buffy, which is "so exquisitely nuanced that her lack of an Emmy nomination, at the very least, feels like an affront".
