= Out of My Mind (Buffy the Vampire Slayer) =

- Buffy the Vampire Slayer episode
- Episode no.: Season 5 Episode 4
- Directed by: David Grossman
- Written by: Rebecca Rand Kirshner
- Production code: 5ABB04
- Original air date: October 17, 2000

Guest appearances
- Mercedes McNab as Harmony Kendall; Bailey Chase as Graham Miller; Charlie Weber as Ben; Time Winters as Dr. Overheiser; Amber Benson as Tara Maclay; Kristine Sutherland as Joyce Summers; Dierdre Holder as Hospital Doctor

Episode chronology
← Previous "The Replacement"	Next → "No Place Like Home"
- Buffy the Vampire Slayer season 5

"Out of My Mind" is episode 4 of season 5 of the television show Buffy the Vampire Slayer. The episode aired on October 17, 2000, on The WB.

== Plot ==
At a cemetery, Buffy stalks her vampire prey, killing several new vampires with a little unwanted help from both Riley and Spike. Riley demonstrates quite a bit of enthusiasm and new strength while fighting, while Buffy simply orders Spike to stay out of her way.

Buffy arrives at The Magic Box to train and is pleasantly surprised to see that the backroom has been transformed into an amazing training room. Harmony seeks Spike and his help because she is frightened that Buffy is out to destroy her. The two conspire to kill the Slayer. Joyce is chatting while making breakfast for Dawn, and, in the midst of a sentence, suddenly asks, "Who are you?" before collapsing onto the floor.

At the hospital, an intern, Ben, informs Buffy and Riley that Joyce will be fine, but that doctors are not sure what caused her to collapse. Dawn is playing with a stethoscope and when she listens to Riley's heart, she finds that it is racing much faster than normal. After listening to Riley's heart, a doctor recommends that he stay in the hospital, as tachycardia puts him at high risk of a heart attack, but Riley disregards their concerns. Buffy tries to think of a way to help Riley and finally resolves to go to Riley's place and contacts the Initiative via the bugs in his room. Still part of the government, Graham tries to force Riley to see a doctor, but Riley is stronger than Graham and the other agents and gets away. After speaking with Graham later that day, Buffy takes it upon herself to get Riley to a doctor before he dies. Buffy gives Spike information about the doctor that can help Riley hoping that the vampire could help find Riley and bring him there. Instead, Spike and Harmony kidnap the doctor in order to force him to remove Spike's chip.

Searching for Riley in the ruins of the high school, Willow uses a "Fiat Lux" ("Let there be light") spell to create light rather than use a flashlight. Tara is concerned by this.

Buffy finds Riley in the Initiative caves, punching into rock because he cannot feel any pain. He tells her that he is afraid he will not be enough for her once he lets the doctors operate on him. After convincing Riley to get medical attention, Buffy brings him to the hospital and finds Dr. Overheiser gone. Just after Overheiser finishes sewing up Spike's skull, Buffy arrives with Riley and a fight ensues. As he tries to bite the Slayer, Spike finds that the doctor only pretended to remove the chip from his head. When Riley suffers a heart attack and collapses while fighting Harmony, Buffy and the doctor immediately turn their attention to him. With the humans distracted, an enraged Spike escapes with Harmony, ranting about his disgust with Buffy and his weariness with how she is seemingly the source of everything wrong with his life. The doctor is able to operate successfully on Riley. Later, Graham talks with Riley and releases him from the Initiative.

Afterwards, Buffy goes to Spike's crypt with the intention of staking him; however, when she confronts him, he angrily tells her to kill him. Spike angrily berates Buffy as the source of his torment and yells that he would rather die and be free of her. However, Buffy cannot bring herself to do it and the pair kiss. Suddenly Spike wakes up beside a still sleeping Harmony; he has merely suffered a nightmare, but Spike is mortified at the thought of having feelings for Buffy.
