= Rupert Giles =

Character in Buffy the Vampire Slayer

- Buffy the Vampire Slayer character
- First appearance: "Welcome to the Hellmouth" (1997)
- Last appearance: Finale (2018)
- Created by: Joss Whedon
- Portrayed by: Anthony Head
- Voiced by: Anthony Head

In-universe information
- Affiliation: Watchers' Council; Scooby Gang
- Classification: Watcher
- Notable powers: Superior knowledge of demonology, mystical artifacts, and the black arts. Genius level intellect. Fluency in several languages. Experience in hand-to-hand combat. Trained in library and information science.

Rupert Giles (/ˈdʒaɪəlz/) is a fictional character created by Joss Whedon for the television series Buffy the Vampire Slayer. The character was portrayed by Anthony Head. He serves as Buffy Summers' mentor and surrogate father figure. The character proved popular with viewers, and Head's performance in the role was well received. Following Buffy's run, Whedon intended to launch a television spin-off focused on the character, but rights issues prevented the project from developing. Outside of the television series, the character has appeared substantially in Expanded Universe material such as novels, comic books, and short stories.

Giles' primary role in the series is Watcher to Buffy (Sarah Michelle Gellar) in her capacity as vampire Slayer; he is in the employ of the Watchers' Council, a British organisation that attempts to oversee the actions of the Slayer. From youth, Giles was expected to follow the family tradition and become a Watcher, though as a teenager and young adult he rebelled, dropping out of Oxford University to experiment in dark magic and the rock music scene, until a bereavement brought him to his senses. In adulthood, his loyalty to Buffy and her group of friends costs him his job for a time. As the series progresses, Giles increasingly becomes a father figure to Buffy and her friends Willow (Alyson Hannigan) and Xander (Nicholas Brendon). His encyclopedic knowledge, affinity for magic, moderate fighting skills and willingness to kill when necessary make him an asset to Buffy in her fight against the supernatural evils that plague Sunnydale, California.

Following Buffy's conclusion in 2003, Whedon intended to continue Giles' story as a spin-off series, Ripper, which he intended to produce with the BBC. The series was to depict Giles in ghost stories set in present-day England, coping with loneliness as well as figurative ghosts from his own chequered past. Over several years Whedon restated his commitment to the project, though announced it would take the form of a one-off TV movie. Despite Head's availability and the BBC's willingness to fund the project, rights issues concerning the character ultimately led to it not developing further. Canonically, the character's story is continued in the comic book Buffy the Vampire Slayer Season Eight (2007–2011) and subsequent stories. The Season Eight sequel Angel & Faith (2011–) heavily features Giles and utilizes ideas and characters from the proposed Ripper spin-off.

== Biography ==
=== Character history ===
Rupert Edmund Giles (most frequently called Giles) was born circa 1955 in England. His family has worked within the Council of Watchers for at least three generations; both his father and grandmother, Edna Giles (née Fairweather), were also Watchers. As a child, Giles dreamt of being either "a fighter pilot or possibly a grocer", but he soon learned that being a Watcher is a calling, much as being a Slayer is, and Rupert's father explained his destiny to him when he was ten years old (revealed in "Never Kill a Boy on the First Date").

Although the Scooby Gang later joked that he wore tweed nappies as a child, Giles was in fact a rebellious youth, rejecting his responsibility as a Watcher and dropping out of Oxford University, where he was studying history, when he was twenty-one. During this time, Giles claimed to be a founding member of Pink Floyd in order to impress girls (although since Pink Floyd was founded in 1965, when Giles would have been around ten years old, it was not a particularly credible claim), and may have delved into criminal activity (he remarks that hot-wiring a car is "like riding a bloody bicycle", and a psychologically younger Giles has no qualms about breaking into a clothing store and attacking a police officer). He is a talented singer and guitar player (as Head was in real life) which the gang discovered, to their astonishment, when they saw him singing "Behind Blue Eyes" by The Who in "Where the Wild Things Are". Spike also saw him singing "Free Bird" by Lynyrd Skynyrd in "The Yoko Factor".

He began to explore dark magic and befriended a group of young people who delved into the dark arts for fun or money: Ethan Rayne, Philip Henry, Dierdre Page, Thomas Sutcliff, and Randall. Giles gained the nickname "Ripper" during this time. Together, the group summoned a demon called Eyghon, who would possess and eventually destroy Randall. Following Randall's death, Ethan and the others failed to exorcise Eyghon, and Giles accepted his destiny of becoming a Watcher. Before becoming a fully-fledged Watcher, he also worked as "the curator of a British museum, maybe the British Museum" as Willow says ("Welcome to the Hellmouth"), although, given the context, she may well have been repeating a rumor that was going around the school.

=== Sunnydale ===
At the behest of the Watchers' Council, Giles travels to Sunnydale, California, and works as the librarian at the local secondary school. There he meets the current Slayer, Buffy Summers, whom he begins training. The library, a quasi-command centre for Buffy's demon-hunting gang, sits right above the Hellmouth.

As the Watcher, librarian, and general authority figure, Giles often delivers exposition. He is a father figure to Buffy and her friends Xander Harris and Willow Rosenberg, together forming the "core four" of the Scooby Gang. Giles is often portrayed as something of a "straight man" and his "stuffy" Oxford sensibility serves as counterpoint to the stereotypical Southern Californian characters and setting. He makes a "weird cluck-cluck sound with his tongue" when he is angry but is "too English to say anything" ("Faith, Hope & Trick"). He admits to being technophobic, a fact which often brings him into conflict with technopagan and computer science teacher, Jenny Calendar. However, after Jenny aids him in casting the demon Moloch out of the Internet, the pair reach an understanding and begin a romantic relationship. Despite his obvious fear with modern technology, Giles is quite adept with computers, which is required in his occupation as a librarian (season 3 episode "Gingerbread") and likely had received this training while earning his master's degree in library and information science. It was never revealed of which library school Giles attended or whether he had pursued his PhD in this field.

In season 2, Giles' dark side is revealed and his relationship with Jenny deepens. In "The Dark Age", Ethan Rayne comes to Sunnydale to flee the demon Eyghon. Giles ashamedly admits to Buffy that he was responsible for summoning the demon in his youth, and is horrified when Jenny becomes possessed by Eyghon. Although Eyghon is defeated, Jenny takes time to cope with her ordeal, remaining distant from Giles in the meantime. When new Slayer Kendra Young arrives in Sunnydale, Giles shares with her an appreciation for obscure texts, resulting in Buffy nicknaming her the "She-Giles." Giles feels betrayed when Jenny reveals she is actually a member of the Kalderash gypsy clan, sent to keep an eye on Buffy's relationship with the vampire Angel. When Angel loses his soul he reverts to his evil, sadistic alter ego Angelus. Angelus murders Jenny, leaving her corpse for Giles to find in a romantic setting in his apartment ("Passion"), Giles seeks revenge by burning down Angelus' base. Angelus later kidnaps and tortures him, and Drusilla hypnotizes him into thinking she is Jenny so he will reveal how to awake Acathla. Buffy is forced to kill Angel to save the world, despite Willow's restoring his soul, and subsequently leaves Sunnydale.

In season 3, Giles's paternal feelings for Buffy strengthen significantly. He spends the summer desperately following up every clue as to Buffy's whereabouts, and is overjoyed when she finally returns months later. Giles briefly serves as Watcher for Kendra's replacement Slayer, Faith Lehane. The Scoobies are given another disturbing glimpse in Giles' past when, along with every other adult in Sunnydale, he reverts to being a teenager by enchanted band candy supplied by Ethan Rayne. He indulges in theft and vandalism, and makes out with and has sex with Buffy's mother, Joyce Summers. When Buffy keeps Angel's return from hell a secret from the other Scoobies, Giles feels betrayed by her love for the man who tortured him and murdered Jenny, but later agrees to help Angel in "Amends".

As Buffy's Cruciamentum approaches (a brutal tradition of the Watchers' Council in which a depowered Slayer is forced to battle a particularly dangerous vampire using only her wits), Giles struggles to cope with the guilt of betraying Buffy's trust. Despite describing the test as "an archaic exercise in cruelty", he secretly injects Buffy with muscle relaxants and adrenaline suppressors, which weaken her significantly, before finally coming clean when the vampire she is meant to fight escapes. Buffy is disgusted, but is later moved when Giles interferes to save her life and is subsequently dismissed for having a father's love for her. Giles is fired, and replaced with Wesley Wyndam-Pryce, but continues to act as Buffy's unofficial Watcher, proving especially helpful when Wesley turns out to be an incompetent coward. When Buffy briefly finds herself endowed with telepathic powers, she 'hears' her mother remembering that Giles was "like a stevedore" during sex. In a battle with the demonic Mayor of Sunnydale, Giles presses the trigger which destroys the Mayor and Sunnydale High, putting himself out of a job.

In season 4, Giles must cope with unemployment and a growing awareness that Buffy no longer needs him. He continues a sexual relationship with his old friend Olivia. Lacking a sense of purpose, he spends most of his time lounging around his apartment, watching Passions with Spike. He gets depressed, especially when the Scoobies fail to keep him in the loop regarding Buffy's new boyfriend Riley Finn and his membership in the Initiative. In the episode "Something Blue", Giles becomes blind as a result of a faulty spell cast by Willow Rosenberg. When Ethan Rayne casts a spell on Giles which turns him into a Fyarl demon ("A New Man"), he must enlist Spike's help to escape the Initiative and Buffy, which believes him to be a demon who murdered Giles. Buffy, about to kill him, at the last moment recognizes his eyes and "annoyed" expression, and Ethan is taken into custody by the Initiative. In order to defeat the cyber-demonoid Adam, Buffy, Willow, Xander and Giles cast a spell to combine their strength. Giles provides the "mind," and Buffy is able to defeat Adam.

At the beginning of season 5, Giles no longer sees his place in Sunnydale and decides to go back to England, telling no one except Willow, whom he needs to organize the research documents for the Scoobies. He quickly abandons this decision when Buffy asks him to be her Watcher again, confessing that she needs him, both emotionally and in order to discover more about what being a Slayer means.

When the owner of The Magic Box is killed by vampires, Giles is convinced by the shop's high profit margins to buy it, hiring Anya as his overly enthusiastic assistant. Buffy learns that her sister, Dawn Summers, is actually the Key: mystical energy disguised in human form to conceal it from the hell-god Glory. Buffy initially confides only in Giles about Dawn's true nature, and he decides to contact the Watchers' Council for more information about Glory. In "Checkpoint", Quentin Travers tries to coerce Buffy to obey the Council's demands, by threatening to have Giles deported. Buffy stands up to the Council, pointing out that without her there is no need for a Council, and tells them to give her all information concerning Glory and to reinstate Giles as her official Watcher. Travers reluctantly agrees, and leaves.

As the Scoobies labor to find a way to defeat Glory, Giles brings up the difficult idea of killing Dawn to end Glory's plans to take over the world. Buffy vows to protect Dawn at all costs. Glory shares her body with an innocent human named Ben, and can be killed if Ben dies. In the final battle against Glory, Buffy abandons the fight when Glory turns back into a wounded Ben, so that she can save Dawn. Giles is less merciful. Explaining that Buffy is a hero and therefore different from the rest of humanity, he suffocates Ben with his bare hands ("The Gift").

Season 6 sees Giles reluctantly stepping back to allow Buffy to gain independence. One hundred and forty-seven days after her death, Giles decides to return to England. On the very day he leaves, Willow, Xander, Anya and Tara resurrect Buffy, and he comes back as soon as he hears of this. Despite being overjoyed to have Buffy back, he is furious at Willow for invoking such dark magic, and angrily dismisses her as "a rank, arrogant amateur." While the other Scoobies believe Buffy was in Hell, Giles is not convinced, and his suspicions prove true when a demon's musical spell causes Buffy to reveal to them all that she was indeed in Heaven. As Buffy begins to rely excessively on Giles for financial and emotional support, he decides his presence is preventing her assuming responsibility for her life. He leaves again for his native England, moving to a place near Bath, where he works with a powerful local coven.

A few months later, Tara is killed by a stray bullet as Warren Mears attacks Buffy. Willow, still recovering from an addiction to magic, suffers a relapse, kills Warren and attempts to kill his former partners in crime, before resolving to end humanity's pain (and her own) by destroying the world. Hearing of a dark power rising in Sunnydale, Giles teleports back there, wielding great magical power borrowed from the Devon Coven. As Dark Willow boasts of her indestructibility, Giles knocks her to the floor with a blast of magic energy, saying "I'd like to test that theory" ("Two to Go"). After being filled in on everything that has happened to the Scoobies in his absence, Giles apologizes to Buffy, insisting that he never should have left them, but Buffy assures him that he did the right thing. Knowing that Willow is too strong to defeat, he tricks her into draining him of his white magics, which brings him near death. It also allows Xander to reason with Willow as the good magic brings out her natural love and compassion, eating away at the evil within her. Giles returns to England with Willow for her rehabilitation. A few months later, he brings Potential Slayers to Sunnydale to protect them from the First Evil and its Bringers. Giles had removed a few volumes from the headquarters of the Watchers' Council, which is soon afterward destroyed by Caleb, an agent of the First. An injured Watcher named Robson witnessed Giles about to be decapitated by a Bringer before blacking out. When the Scoobies hear about this, they worry that Giles may have been killed and the First is merely impersonating him. They are relieved when Anya, Dawn, Xander and Andrew tackle him to the ground, proving he is corporeal and therefore not the First. Giles later loses Buffy's trust somewhat when he takes part in a scheme with Robin Wood to kill Spike ("Lies My Parents Told Me"). Buffy tells him, "I think you've taught me everything I need to know." Giles believes that Buffy kept Spike around for personal reasons rather than tactical ones; this is confirmed when she talks to Spike the night before the final battle under the Hellmouth. In the series finale, Giles participates in the battle of the Hellmouth, and survives.

Shortly after Buffy ended its seven-year televised run, there was talk of a Giles-based spin-off series for the BBC entitled Ripper. At Comicon in 2007, Joss Whedon stated that Ripper was still planned and in the pipeline, but as of 2026 and with Head's death, nothing is expected to ever come of the project.

In season 5 of Angel, Angel contacts Giles via phone twice. It is established that, after the events of "Chosen", Giles travels to Europe with Buffy to train new Slayers. He also takes Andrew Wells under his wing, training him to be a Watcher. In "Damage", Andrew claims to be "faster, stronger and 82% more manly" as a result of Giles' mentoring. Later in "A Hole in the World", after Fred dies, Angel phones Giles, desperate to get in contact with Willow, who cannot be located. After Angel confirms that he still works for Wolfram & Hart, Giles coldly hangs up on him. Originally, Giles was to appear in "A Hole in the World" as the one whom Angel and Spike approached in an attempt to save Fred, because Whedon needed a character who would be instantly believed (by the characters and by the audience) when he said there was no way to save Fred. As it was too expensive for Anthony Stewart Head to fly out to Los Angeles to guest-star, Whedon created Drogyn the Battlebrand, who was mystically compelled to tell the truth.

=== Literature ===
A main character from the beginning of the series, Giles has appeared in most of the spin-off books published based on the series. He plays a particularly key role in The Lost Slayer series, where a chain of events lead to Buffy (from a point early in the fourth season) being projected into the body of her twenty-four-year-old self in a timeline where Giles was turned into a vampire by the followers of an Aztec bat god, forcing Buffy to face a foe who knows her every technique before she manages to find a way to return to the past and prevent Giles being captured and turned.

In the canonical comic book continuation of the series, Buffy the Vampire Slayer Season Eight, the Scooby Gang has expanded into a global organization, training approximately five hundred Slayers spread over ten squads. Giles is head of the Slayer operations in England, parallel with Andrew's operations in Italy and Buffy and Xander's in Scotland, and he keeps in close contact with Xander and Andrew, discussing issues. In the Season Eight arc, "No Future For You", he comes to Faith to request her assistance assassinating another Slayer, who will bring about the Apocalypse if left unchecked. After they are both forced to make the difficult decisions to kill the rogue Slayer Gigi and her mentor Roden, they decide to work together in the future as equal partners, keeping Slayers from turning down the dark path that both Faith and Gigi walked. As a result of their covert operation, Buffy and Giles are no longer on speaking terms.

In the story "Safe," Giles and Faith hear of a "Slayer Sanctuary" in a town called Hanselstadt from a young Slayer named Courtney. There, Giles encounters Duncan Fillworthe, a former Watcher, who claims vampires do not dare to enter the town because they know the town contains an army of Slayers. Later, as Giles argues that a stalemate is not a solution to the vampire problem, Duncan reveals that in fact the town is feeding the Slayers who come seeking sanctuary to an ancient demon. The fear of the demon is what really keeps the vampires from entering. Giles goes to warn Faith as Duncan states this is the fate that Slayers deserve for rejecting the Watchers Council, especially Buffy, reminding Giles that Buffy's relationship with Angel resulted in Jenny Calendar's death. Giles finds Faith already in combat with the demon, which feeds on beings who feel regret and fear. While trying to free Courtney from the demon, Duncan intercepts Giles. During their skirmish, the demon devours Duncan and Giles saves Courtney while Faith kills the demon. The stalemate ended, Giles and Faith rally the reluctant townspeople against the coming vampires, telling them if they want to live, they'll have to fight. After Harmony Kendall's reality show establishes a new pro-vampire, anti-Slayer world order, Faith and Giles are in hiding in the Führerbunker in the "Retreat" storyline. Once their underground hideout is compromised by demons, they retreat to Scotland to reunite with Buffy. Giles and Buffy are driven to reconcile by Twilight's attacks. The entire group are later transported to Oz in Tibet to learn how to suppress magic to stop Twilight tracking them.

In the penultimate issue of Season Eight, Angel is possessed by a powerful mystical entity known as Twilight, and while under its influence, murders Giles, after Giles deliberately put himself in harm's way to provoke Buffy to action. Angel does so by snapping Giles' neck, homaging Angelus' murder of Jenny Calendar. While Angelus killed Jenny in vampiric face—a result of Joss not wanting the audience to truly hate Angel's face—Giles is murdered while Angel's face is in human form. Afterwards, it is revealed that Giles has left to Faith his entire estate in his will (with the exception of the 'Vampyr' book from the first episode of the series, which he leaves to Buffy), and Faith assures Buffy this doesn't mean Giles cared about her less but rather felt Faith needed it more.

In a 2011 interview, Whedon stated that his decision to kill off Giles could not be discussed in detail "because ripples from that event" will also be a large part of both Buffy Season Nine and Angel and Faith. However, he was able to explain other motivations; he felt that from a writing perspective, Giles did not work in the comic book medium where he had flourished on the television show. His primary roles - provider of narrative exposition, and paternal figure - didn't work well in the comic book format. Whedon killed off Giles where he did so that it might have a greater effect on the coming season, "because [he] wanted to make all this matter".

In the follow-up comic series Angel & Faith, Angel makes it his personal mission to bring Giles back to life. Over the course of several arcs Giles' life before Sunnydale is shown in flashbacks as Angel and Faith gather pieces of Giles' soul from demons or magical objects that were significant in Giles' life. These parts of his soul are absorbed into Angel's body using the mystical Tooth of Ammuk. They are joined by Rupert's great-aunts Lavinia and Sophronia Fairweather, two depowered witches who used magic to remain young, and an old friend of Giles named Alasdair Coames who is a depowered magical archmage and collector of magical artifacts. In the "Death and Consequences" arc Angel and Faith discover Giles is not buried in his grave. It has been possessed by the demon Eyghon who had survived "The Dark Age". Because Giles had sold his soul to Eyghon in his youth, he did not move on even though he died a natural death, and the core of his soul went to Eyghon, while smaller parts broke off and attached themselves to the things Angel & Faith had found. Thus, it is possible for Giles to be resurrected from a natural death in a world with no current source of magic. Angel recruits Spike to help him kill Eyghon and a group of British Slayers reluctantly agree to work with them to save their friends who are still alive from Eyghon's control. The presence of three beings inside Angel's body (himself, Angelus and Giles) prevent Eyghon from controlling Angel, and Giles speaks through him as Angel kills Eyghon and therefore has all of Giles' soul. It is later transferred out of Angel to a mystical vessel. Using a mystical item to restore Giles' corpse to full health and Coames' collection of artifacts to provide magic for a resurrection spell, Angel, Faith, Coames and the Fairweathers try to bring him back to life. The group is shocked when Giles comes back to life with all his memories intact, but in the body of a 12-year-old boy due to his Aunts thinking of him as a child during the ritual. Giles is grateful to be free of Eyghon but furious at the age of his body and they have been trying to bring him back and not stopping a plot by villains Whistler (Buffyverse), Pearl and Nash to mutate humans into a magical species at the cost of a few billion lives. Before confronting them, Giles says to Faith she has grown into a fine woman and they may have wanted him back, but none of the group needs him like they used to. The villains plan to unleash their plague by releasing an orb of pure magic into the upper atmosphere. Giles is able to use ambient magic to attack Nash with a fireball causing him to drop the orb but it also mutates a nearby crowd. Nash is killed causing Pearl to flee. Whistler sees the error of his ways and sacrifices his life to destroy the orb. In the aftermath of the battle, Giles wants Faith to keep his money. He decides to return to America because he was at his best with Buffy, not noticing he has hurt Faith's feelings. He parts on good terms with Angel who is staying in London's new Magic Town suburb.

While resenting the challenges of his youthful body compared to his adult mind, Giles adapts to his new situation, particularly with the discovery that his command of magic is more potent in his youthful body; his aunts speculate that he is tapping into the full potential that he repressed to focus on his studies as a Watcher.

== Powers and abilities ==
Giles has extensive knowledge of demonology and Slayer combat (including at least a theoretical knowledge of jujutsu and aikido, but excelling at the art of fencing), mainly due to his training as a Watcher. His youthful interest in witchcraft and sorcery has endured into his adult life; though his natural aptitude for it is only moderate (much less than that of Willow), he does have a high amount of magical knowledge. Giles is proficient in several languages, including Latin, ancient Greek, Sumerian ("Primeval"), Japanese ("Checkpoint"), and possibly Gaelic ("Fear, Itself"), but weak in German ("Gingerbread"), Mandarin and Cantonese ("First Date"). While he has no prominent supernatural powers of his own, his extensive experience with dealing with vampires, demons, and other creatures makes him capable of handling them effectively.

Giles has moderate skill in hand-to-hand combat, as well as various melee weapons. While his demeanor is typically mild and polite, Giles is not above using raw violence to solve a problem, such as physically threatening Principal Snyder into readmitting Buffy to school after her expulsion ("Dead Man's Party"), pummeling Angelus senseless with a flaming baseball bat and burning down his hideout upon discovering that he had killed Jenny Calendar ("Passion"), manhandling Spike while ordering him to get over his feelings for Buffy ("I Was Made to Love You"), forcing Glory's minion Slook to talk by inflicting a painful-sounding injury offscreen ("Tough Love"), severely beating up Ethan Rayne for information ("Halloween"), and suffocating a critically injured Ben with his bare hands to keep Glory from awakening in his body. ("The Gift"). Typically, however, Giles' calm demeanor and professionalism offer him a detached state of authority even in the face of fearsome monsters, as demonstrated during his confrontation with a violent demon in "The Long Way Home". He is also shown to be able to quickly hotwire a car in the episode "Dead Man's Party".

In the season 6 finale, Giles was temporarily endowed with powers of the Devon Coven in an attempt to stop Willow. During this time, he demonstrated powers such as teleportation, telekinesis, and energy projection. He lost all of these powers when Willow drained him and left him on the brink of death, but he recovered immediately after Xander calmed her down from her rampage. His moderate proficiency in magic combined with his natural acumen and intelligence still make him quite formidable; in Season Eight's "No Future for You", he kills the warlock Roden, who could fly and conjure easily, through using a spell inventively. After being resurrected in the form of an adolescent, Giles displays much more magical aptitude, which is briefly lost when Willow temporarily ages him back into an adult form. Sophronia and Lavinia theorised that if Giles had been tutored in magic by them rather than being trained as a Watcher at the wishes of his father and grandmother, he would have become an extremely powerful magician, and could achieve this potential in his new life.

Despite his vast intelligence, Giles is not what one would call technology-savvy and is, by his own admission, somewhat technophobic. However, being a librarian, his occupation requires the use of up-to-date technology and skills to further a library service's goals to serve its patrons efficiently, and in one episode ("Gingerbread"), shows that Giles is proficient with computers at least on a basic level. However, he is dependent on Willow for tasks that are beyond his computer skill set. It's important to mention his taste in capable transportation.

Despite his lack of tech savviness, his choice in transportation is very wise. He drives a 1963 Citroen DS 21, a notably resilient and reliable car, even for its age. It won several grueling and hazardous motorsports events, including the Monte Carlo Rally in France and 1000 Lakes Rally. It even protected a French President against an assassination attempt without any armor.

== Reception ==
Head's portrayal of Giles was largely well received by television critics. An article for The Wrap summarized, "For more than five seasons, the British actor added depth and charm to Joss Whedon's groundbreaking 1997-2003 series as mild-mannered librarian Rupert Giles." Head was nominated in for the 2001 Saturn Award for Best Supporting Actor, but lost out to co-star James Marsters.
