= Beauty and the Beasts =

- Buffy the Vampire Slayer episode
- Episode no.: Season 3 Episode 4
- Directed by: James Whitmore, Jr.
- Written by: Marti Noxon
- Production code: 3ABB04
- Original air date: October 20, 1998

Guest appearances
- Fab Filippo as Scott Hope; John Patrick White as Pete Clarner; Danielle Weeks as Debbie; Phill Lewis as Mr. Platt; Eliza Dushku as Faith Lehane

Episode chronology
← Previous "Faith, Hope & Trick"	Next → "Homecoming"
- Buffy the Vampire Slayer season 3

"Beauty and the Beasts" is the fourth episode of season three of the horror-drama television show Buffy the Vampire Slayer. It was written by Marti Noxon, directed by James Whitmore, Jr., and first broadcast on The WB on October 20, 1998.

When a boy is found mauled to death on the nights surrounding the full moon, Oz is suspected. Buffy has to deal with the fact that Angel is back from a hellish demon dimension, broken and animalistic.

== Plot ==
The day of a full moon, Xander and Giles learn about a brutal murder in the woods the night before. They discover that Xander had slept through his watch of the werewolf Oz, and that the window in the library rare book pen, where Oz cages himself, is open.

Buffy begins to open up about her life to Mr. Platt, the school psychologist. On patrol that night, Angel attacks her in the woods. Animalistic, he is no match for Buffy, who chains him up in the mansion. She sees the spot on the floor where she left his ring; it was scorched by Angel's body on his return. Willow, Xander and Cordelia enter the morgue to collect hair samples from the body of the mauled boy.

Buffy tells Giles that she had a vivid dream of Angel coming back. Giles explains that time passes differently in demonic dimensions, so any being who manages to return would most likely have been turned into a monster. Buffy wonders if Angel was responsible for the murder; the hair samples were inconclusive. She returns to Platt's office to pour her heart out, then realizes that he has been mauled to death.

When school classmates Pete and Debbie sneak into a room to make out, Pete discovers that one of his chemistry jars has been emptied and accuses Debbie of drinking its contents. Pete yells at Debbie, then transforms into a monster. He tells her that he used to need the substance to turn into the monster, but now only needs to get mad. He begins beating Debbie, blaming her for making him mad. As he transforms back into his human form, she forgives him.

Oz is no longer suspected, as Platt was killed during the day. He meets up with Debbie and notices her black eye. Buffy and Willow seek out Debbie, and try in vain to talk sense into her. Meanwhile, Angel breaks free from his shackles, and Pete finds Oz in the library. Pete turns into a monster and starts to beat up Oz for talking to Debbie. The sun sets and the tables are turned when Oz transforms into his werewolf form, Oz becoming evenly matched in strength, and begins fighting Pete. Buffy tries to tranquilize Oz, but Debbie pushes the gun away and Buffy ends up shooting Giles. Buffy chases after Pete while Willow and Faith pursue Oz.

After a struggle, Faith sedates Oz with a dart. Buffy follows Pete's blood trail, but he finds Debbie first and despite her pleas and attempts to appease him, he kills her. Buffy finds Pete, but he knocks her to the ground and advances threateningly on her. Angel arrives and he and Pete begin fighting; Angel uses the chains that still bind his wrists to kill Pete. Afterwards, he reverts to his human face and calls out Buffy's name before falling to his knees and embracing her in tears. Buffy begins to cry as well, finally accepting that Angel is back.

== Themes ==
According to Erin Waggoner, "Beauty and the Beasts" is an example of a Buffy episode that condemns aggressive masculinity. It shows a male student hoping to appear more virile by using a potion, resulting in a Jekyll and Hyde-style change of character and the physical and verbal abuse of his girlfriend.

Reviewer Billie Doux rated the episode at three out of four stakes with the observation, "Someone's monster boyfriend is killing people — but which one? ... Here we have a fairly typical abusive relationship: the abuser, Pete, blaming the abused, Debbie, for his behavior ("You know you shouldn't make me mad, you know what happens"), Debbie making excuses for Pete ("It's me — I make him crazy") but then we have that extra added touch, because Pete has been drinking something fluorescent that has made him Mr. Hyde."

While watching over Oz while he is a werewolf in the cage, Buffy and Willow take turns reading passages from Jack London's 1903 novel The Call of the Wild, which is about a domestic dog who survives abuse and eventually joins a wolf pack.

== Reception ==
Reaction to the episode was mixed.

Vox ranked it at #119 of all 144 episodes on their "Every Episode Ranked From Worst to Best" list, writing, "Sure, the monster of the week here is a little bit ham-fisted: it's a Jekyll and Hyde metaphor about how abusive relationships are bad... But the rest of the episode does a fantastic job of balancing the episodic stuff with the Willow/Oz and Buffy/Angel stuff, and continuing to explore Buffy's grief and guilt over having killed Angel last season." Paste Magazine, in a similar list, ranked it at #115 and wrote, "I love it when Oz gets off the sidelines for more than comic relief and Seth Green does a great job portraying one of the most tragic characters in the Slayerverse, but man, this one has way too much jammed into it." However, it is "a perfectly serviceable (albeit a bit too on-the-nose) MoTW/Oz-centered episode about domestic violence."

Roger Pocock writes, "This week it is Faith's turn to supply the metaphor: 'all men are beasts'," but he argues that the metaphor "doesn't ideally translate to the specific issue Buffy is facing." Still, "The traumatic aspects of the episode are nicely balanced with a little bit of humour, and a lot of fantasy mash-ups." With pleasure, he lists the "line-up of battles: Mr Hyde vs the Wolfman, Wolfman vs Slayer, Slayer vs Mr Hyde, Mr Hyde vs Vampire." Mike Loschiavo also enjoyed the call-outs to classic Universal Pictures films and said, "Season Three of Buffy continues taking us on the emotional journey with the cast following the story through the characters, but it manages to still give us episodes that are very clearly defined. It's a very unusual approach but one that I feel is paying off in spades."

Justin Carreiro of TVFanatic.com argues that Scott, Pete, Debbie, and Mr. Platt should have been introduced in earlier episodes, so that the audience would have some emotional investment in them. "The debate over Oz's transformation and the murder could've been answered with simple logic." Besides, "A lot of exposition was included in one scene to answer all the questions that weren't shared beforehand... The glowing green liquid was the be-all-end-all answer for this Dr. Jekyll and Mr. Hyde curse." However, he did like the "amazing comedic chemistry" of Cordelia, Xander and Willow.

Mark Oshiro commented that "this show really knows how to capture the awkwardness of high school," and with the issue of domestic violence, "Marti Nixon did a fine job." Noel Murray of The A.V. Club criticized the episode: "The pacing is too slack; the jokes too sparse; the tone too preachy. The cast is ill-used... though I appreciate the idea of a Buffy episode exploring how male aggression affects the women in their lives, I thought the theme was handled pretty ham-fistedly here. The episode turned into a PSA against abusive boyfriends, when there were so many more subtle ways to have tackled this topic."
