= Buffy the Vampire Slayer season 5 =

2000–2001 season of Buffy the Vampire Slayer

Buffy the Vampire Slayer
- Season 5
- Region 1 Season 5 DVD cover
- Showrunner: Joss Whedon
- Starring: Sarah Michelle Gellar; Nicholas Brendon; Alyson Hannigan; Marc Blucas; Emma Caulfield; Michelle Trachtenberg; James Marsters; Anthony Stewart Head
- No. of episodes: 22

Release
- Original network: The WB
- Original release: September 26, 2000 – May 22, 2001

Season chronology
- ← Previous; Season 4 Next → Season 6

The fifth season of the television series Buffy the Vampire Slayer premiered on September 26, 2000, on The WB and concluded its 22-episode season on May 22, 2001. It maintained its previous timeslot, airing Tuesdays at 8:00 pm ET. This was the final season to air on The WB before it moved to UPN; The WB billed the season five finale as "The WB series finale".

== Plot ==
In the season premiere, the famous vampire Count Dracula makes an appearance in Sunnydale in search of Buffy. He then bites Buffy in the same place where she was bitten by The Master and Angel ("Prophecy Girl" and "Graduation Day"). Buffy breaks free from his will and Dracula is defeated and staked, but not killed because of Dracula's extraordinary powers.

Season five introduces Buffy's younger "sister", Dawn, who suddenly appears in Buffy's life. Although she is new to the series, to the characters it is as if she has always been there; but Buffy remains somewhat suspicious and jealous of Dawn's bond with their mother. Xander's girlfriend Anya Jenkins begins to experience deeper human emotions, both negative and positive, such as a love for money. Anya is hired by Giles and works alongside him at a magic shop called The Magic Box.

Meanwhile, Glorificus, or Glory, a hell-goddess who was exiled from her dimension after a war, has come to Earth. She can only remain there by being connected to her human form; a medical intern called Ben. Glory takes the form of a beautiful young woman, with some of her powers still intact as long as she maintains her strength through draining people of their sanity. She begins searching for a "Key" that will allow her to return to her Hell dimension by blurring the lines between dimensions, and in the process unleashing Hell on Earth. At the beginning of the season Glory and Ben are vying for control, alternating who possesses the body they share; later the line between them begins to blur and they experience each other's emotions and memories.

When Joyce suffers from unexplained headaches, Buffy suspects Dawn may be harming her, but they discover that they were caused by a brain tumor. Buffy soon discovers that the Key's protectors had turned the Key into a human biologically related to the Summers — her new sister Dawn. At the same time, they implanted in her family and friends lifelong memories of her. As a result, Buffy, and especially Joyce, begin to accept Dawn as a true part of the family. Upon learning of Joyce's tumor, Buffy leaves her dorm to take care of her mother. Spike, still implanted with the Initiative chip, realizes he is in love with Buffy and begins fighting alongside the Scoobies after learning of Joyce's tumor and supports Dawn when she learns of her true origins. Riley leaves Buffy in the middle of the season after concluding that she does not love him, joining a military demon-hunting operation. The Watchers' Council, with which Buffy had previously cut ties, aids in Buffy's research of Glory, and the Council reinstates both her and Giles. When she learns of Spike's feelings for her while he tortures her, Buffy continually refuses his advances and alienates him from the group.

Near the end of the season, Joyce dies of an aneurysm, devastating Dawn and Buffy; Buffy drops out of college to take care of Dawn, who starts skipping school in her grief. Spike commissions Warren Mears to build a robot version of Buffy, later known as the Buffybot. This greatly angers Buffy, but she soon softens after Spike is tortured by Glory yet refuses to reveal that Dawn is the Key. After this ordeal, Buffy warms up to Spike, promising she will not forget what he has done for her and inviting him back into her life. Glory attacks Willow's girlfriend Tara Maclay, draining her of her sanity. In a rage, Willow turns to dark magic in order to gain powers to match Glory's. She vengefully attacks the hell goddess futilely and is nearly killed, but Buffy intervenes. Despite the defeat, this event results in Willow becoming significantly more powerful, but her dependency on magic increases and her personality starts to change in a sinister way.

Glory discovers that Dawn is the Key and kidnaps her. In a moment alone, Xander proposes to Anya. Buffy and her friends track Glory and Dawn to a tower built by Glory's minions. At the time of the ritual, Glory uses Dawn's blood to open the portal between dimensions, but she is distracted by the Scoobies' intervention. Willow takes Tara's sanity from Glory and gives it back, severely weakening Glory. After overpowering Glory, Buffy tells her to leave Sunnydale or die. When Glory reverts to Ben, Giles kills Ben to prevent her return. Dawn wants to sacrifice herself to save the world, but Buffy realizes that because she is related to Dawn, her own blood can also close the portal. She realizes the meaning of the First Slayer's message — "Death is your gift" — and sacrifices her own life to save Dawn's and close the portal. Buffy's friends mourn her death and praise her with the inscription on her headstone, "She saved the world a lot."

== Cast and characters ==
=== Main cast ===
- Sarah Michelle Gellar as Buffy Summers
- Nicholas Brendon as Xander Harris
- Alyson Hannigan as Willow Rosenberg
- Marc Blucas as Riley Finn
- Emma Caulfield as Anya Jenkins
- Michelle Trachtenberg as Dawn Summers
- James Marsters as Spike
- Anthony Stewart Head as Rupert Giles

=== Recurring cast ===
- Amber Benson as Tara Maclay
- Kristine Sutherland as Joyce Summers
- Charlie Weber as Benjamin "Ben" Wilkinson
- Clare Kramer as Glory
- Troy Blendell as Jinx
- Todd Duffey as Murk
- Mercedes McNab as Harmony Kendall
- Bailey Chase as Graham Miller
- Justin Gorence as Orlando
- Joel Grey as Doc
- Kevin Weisman as Dreg
- David Boreanaz as Angel
- Adam Busch as Warren Mears
- Juliet Landau as Drusilla

=== Guest cast ===
- Julie Benz as Darla
- Dean Butler as Hank Summers
- Amelinda Embry as Katrina Silber
- Sharon Ferguson as First Slayer
- Kali Rocha as Cecily Addams/Halfrek
- Harris Yulin as Quentin Travers
- Amy Adams as Beth Maclay

== Crew ==
Series creator Joss Whedon served as executive producer and showrunner, and wrote and directed three episodes including the season finale. Marti Noxon was promoted to co-executive producer and wrote three episodes, including directing two of them. Jane Espenson was promoted to producer and wrote or co-wrote five episodes. David Fury was promoted to supervising producer and wrote three episodes. Douglas Petrie was promoted to co-producer and wrote or co-wrote four episodes. New additions in the fifth season included Rebecca Rand Kirshner, who wrote three episodes and Steven S. DeKnight, who wrote two episodes.

David Solomon directed the highest number of episodes in the fifth season, directing four episodes and was promoted to producer. Joss Whedon, James A. Contner (also co-producer), and David Grossman each directed three.

== Episodes ==
No. overall	No. in season	Title	Directed by	Written by	Original release date	Prod. code	U.S. viewers (millions)
79	1	"Buffy vs. Dracula"	David Solomon	Marti Noxon	September 26, 2000	5ABB01	5.83
Buffy faces Count Dracula who has come to Sunnydale to make her one of his concubines. Dracula turns Xander into a Renfield of sorts, before being defeated but not killed.
80	2	"Real Me"	David Grossman	David Fury	October 3, 2000	5ABB02	6.17
Buffy is having trouble getting along with her sister Dawn, who is kidnapped by Harmony's gang. Harmony makes two inept attempts on Buffy's life, but fails each time and Dawn is saved.
81	3	"The Replacement"	James A. Contner	Jane Espenson	October 10, 2000	5ABB03	5.34
Xander is split into two people by a demon, one strong, the other weak. The lame Xander is unhappy that the cool Xander lives his life better than he can, getting an apartment and generally impressing Anya.
82	4	"Out of My Mind"	David Grossman	Rebecca Rand Kirshner	October 17, 2000	5ABB04	5.10
Riley is risking his health to be able to fight with Buffy. His super soldier enhancement is destroying his heart. Buffy enlists Spike to take Riley to the doctor, but instead Spike kidnaps the doctor to remove his chip.
83	5	"No Place Like Home"	David Solomon	Douglas Petrie	October 24, 2000	5ABB05	6.41
Glory, the new Big Bad, is looking for "The Key". After being beaten by Glory, Buffy meets a monk who reveals to her that she doesn't really have a sister — Dawn is The Key, sent to Buffy for protection.
84	6	"Family"	Joss Whedon	Joss Whedon	November 7, 2000	5ABB06	6.19
Tara is about to celebrate her 20th birthday, and her family comes to abduct her before she becomes a demon. Glory sends demons after the Slayer, and Tara accidentally helps them.
85	7	"Fool for Love"	Nick Marck	Douglas Petrie	November 14, 2000	5ABB07	5.66
After a close call, Buffy asks Spike about the slayers he's killed. Spike tells Buffy the story of his unlife, and reveals a dark secret about Slayers that not even Buffy knew to be true.
86	8	"Shadow"	Dan Attias	David Fury	November 21, 2000	5ABB08	4.83
Joyce Summers has a brain tumor, and Buffy worries about how Dawn will take it. In addition, Buffy must keep her sister safe from Glory and her magic snake.
87	9	"Listening to Fear"	David Solomon	Rebecca Rand Kirshner	November 28, 2000	5ABB09	5.48
As Buffy and Dawn help their mother prepare for surgery, an extraterrestrial preys on Sunnydale's mental patients and follows Joyce home. The alien was summoned by Ben to clean up Glory's mess, and Buffy kills it.
88	10	"Into the Woods"	Marti Noxon	Marti Noxon	December 19, 2000	5ABB10	4.85
Buffy learns Riley has been going to a vampire brothel to have his blood sucked for pleasure. She confronts him, and he says he's going away with the military if she doesn't give him a reason to stay. She wants him to stay, but doesn't tell him in time.
89	11	"Triangle"	Christopher Hibler	Jane Espenson	January 9, 2001	5ABB11	4.85
Emotions between Willow and Anya come to a boil over Xander, and they summon a troll (Olaf). The troll was Anya's ex-boyfriend whom she called vengeance upon. He tries to make Xander choose between the women, but Buffy sends him packing.
90	12	"Checkpoint"	Nick Marck	Douglas Petrie & Jane Espenson	January 23, 2001	5ABB12	5.01
The Watcher's Council withholds information about Glory from Buffy and make her go through a series of tests. Glory and the Knights of Byzantium target Buffy, and she realizes it's because she has power over them. She confronts Quentin Travers and the Council members he brought with him, and makes it clear they work for her, not the other way around. Buffy orders Quentin to give her the scoop on Glory, and learns she is not a demon - she's a god.
91	13	"Blood Ties"	Michael Gershman	Steven S. DeKnight	February 6, 2001	5ABB13	4.89
Dawn discovers that she is the Key, becomes depressed, and runs away. She tells her tale to Ben, who morphs into Glory. Glory, not remembering Ben's thoughts, decides Dawn doesn't know the Key's location, and Willow and Tara teleport Glory elsewhere.
92	14	"Crush"	Dan Attias	David Fury	February 13, 2001	5ABB14	4.90
Spike's profession of love for Buffy is spurned when Drusilla returns. He offers to kill Drusilla for her, but Buffy is unimpressed. After Harmony returns to the scene and attacks Spike for revenge, Drusilla tries to kill Buffy. He saves Buffy from Drusilla, but has his invitation to the Summers' home revoked.
93	15	"I Was Made to Love You"	James A. Contner	Jane Espenson	February 20, 2001	5ABB15	5.11
A robot girlfriend, April, is abandoned by her creator, Warren. When April tries to kill Warren's current girlfriend, Buffy intervenes. Spike secretly coerces Warren into making him a robot of Buffy.
94	16	"The Body"	Joss Whedon	Joss Whedon	February 27, 2001	5ABB16	5.97
Buffy and the gang are crushed by the death of Joyce. Dawn goes to the morgue to see the body and is attacked by a vampire. Buffy saves her and watches as Dawn reaches to touch Joyce.
95	17	"Forever"	Marti Noxon	Marti Noxon	April 17, 2001	5ABB17	4.29
Buffy is comforted by Angel following her mother's death, although he can't stay. Dawn attempts to resurrect Joyce with the help of Spike and Doc, but stops part way through the ceremony after Buffy convinces her.
96	18	"Intervention"	Michael Gershman	Jane Espenson	April 24, 2001	5ABB18	4.73
The Scoobies discover Spike's new robot toy; Glory's minions kidnap Spike, thinking he is the Key, and when they realize he isn't they torture him for information. Buffy and Giles go on a discovery quest about the origin of the Slayer. Buffy is told ominously that "Death is your gift".
97	19	"Tough Love"	David Grossman	Rebecca Rand Kirshner	May 1, 2001	5ABB19	4.59
Willow and Tara get into an argument, leaving Tara vulnerable to be attacked by Glory, who thinks she is the Key. After discovering her error, Tara's mind is partially sucked out and Willow swears revenge.
98	20	"Spiral"	James A. Contner	Steven S. DeKnight	May 8, 2001	5ABB20	5.11
Glory discovers the real Key, and Buffy and company must flee from her, and the Knights of Byzantium who are trying to destroy the Key. The gang race from Sunnydale in a caravan.
99	21	"The Weight of the World"	David Solomon	Douglas Petrie	May 15, 2001	5ABB21	4.76
Willow tries to reach the Slayer, who has been rendered catatonic by Dawn's abduction.
100	22	"The Gift"	Joss Whedon	Joss Whedon	May 22, 2001	5ABB22	5.22
Buffy and the gang set out to rescue Dawn and fight Glory as the ritual commences. Also, Buffy finally realizes the meaning of "Death Is Your Gift."

=== Crossovers with Angel ===
The fifth season of Buffy the Vampire Slayer aired along with the second season of Angel. Both shows retained their timeslots on The WB Television Network, airing on Tuesdays at 8:00 PM ET and 9:00 PM ET respectively.

The Buffy episode "Fool for Love" is a companion to the Angel episode "Darla". Both episodes feature multiple flashbacks to the history of Spike (James Marsters) and Darla (Julie Benz), shown from their respective viewpoints. Angel (David Boreanaz) and Drusilla (Juliet Landau) also appear in both episodes. Both episodes feature a same scene – one from the point of view of Spike and the other from Angelus, Darla, and Drusilla.

Buffy recurring character Drusilla makes her first present-tense appearance on Angel in the episode "The Trial". She returns to Sunnydale in her final present-tense appearance in the episode "Crush".

Angel visits Buffy in the episode "Forever" to comfort her after he learns that her mother died.

Buffy recurring character Harmony Kendall (Mercedes McNab) visits L.A. in the Angel episode "Disharmony". Harmony would later appear in the fifth season of Angel and become a main character. Willow (Alyson Hannigan) also appears in the episode in a conversation with Cordelia (Charisma Carpenter) over the phone.

Willow comes to L.A. in the Angel season two finale, "There's No Place Like Plrtz Glrb" to deliver the news to Angel that Buffy had died.

== Reception ==
The series was included in the American Film Institute's list for the best drama series of the year. Joss Whedon was nominated for a Nebula Award for Best Script for "The Body". The series was nominated for three Television Critics Association Awards, for Individual Achievement in Drama (Sarah Michelle Gellar), Outstanding Achievement in Drama, and Program of the Year.

The episodes "The Body" and "The Gift" were particularly praised by critics. Rolling Stone ranked both episodes as the best episodes of the whole series. Similarly, Vox listed them in the top five of all episodes. David Bianculli in the New York Daily News commended the performances of Gellar, Trachtenberg, Hannigan, and Benson. "The Body", according to Bianculli is "Emmy-worthy ... It also will haunt you—but not in the normal way associated with this still-evolving, still-achieving series." Television critic Alesia Redding and editor Joe Vince of the South Bend Tribune wrote, "I was riveted by this show ... This isn't just one of the best Buffy episodes of all time. It's one of the best episodes of TV of all time." Redding added, "If you watch this incredible episode and don't recognize it as great TV, you're hopeless ... A 'fantasy' show delivers the most stark and realistic take on death I've ever seen, deftly depicting how a loved one who dies suddenly becomes 'the body'." Gareth McLean in The Guardian rejected the notion that Buffy is similar to other "schmaltzy American teen show(s)" like Dawson's Creek: "This episode was a brave, honest and wrenching portrayal of death and loss. The way this was handled by Joss Whedon ... was ingenious. Time slowed down and the feeling of numbness was palpable as Buffy and her gang tried to come to terms with Joyce's death." McLean especially appreciated the small details of Buffy protecting Joyce's dignity and the confusion shown by the characters. He concludes, "Joyce may be dead but long live Buffy the Vampire Slayer." At Salon.com, Joyce Millman wrote, "there hasn't been a finer hour of drama on TV this year than ... 'The Body' ... You have to hand it to the writers; Joyce's demise came as a complete surprise. In that instant, Buffy's childhood officially ends. Even if Buffy gets stiffed in every other Emmy category this year, 'The Body' should convince the nominating committee that Gellar is for real ... I can't remember the last time I saw a more wrenching portrayal of the shock of loss." Andrew Gilstrap at PopMatters declares it "possibly the finest hour of television I've seen, bar none ... It is an incredibly moving episode, one that finally admits that you don't walk away from death unscathed. It also shows that, for all the group's slaying experience, they really weren't prepared for death when it stole a loved one." The Futon Critic named "The Body" the best episode of 2001. Entertainment Weekly named "The Gift" one of TV's best season finales ever.

The fifth season averaged 4.5 million viewers. Rotten Tomatoes gave season five a score of 83% with an average rating of 7.5 out of 10 based on 12 reviews with a critics consensus stating, "Brilliant, risky and beautiful, Buffy reaches past the missteps of season four to deliver a fresh, unpredictable season that ends with a bang." Paste and MovieWeb ranked it the best season of the series.

== Home media ==
Buffy the Vampire Slayer: The Complete Fifth Season was released on DVD in region 1 on December 9, 2003 and in region 2 on October 28, 2002. The DVD includes all 22 episodes on 6 discs presented in full frame 1.33:1 aspect ratio (region 1) and in anamorphic widescreen 1.78:1 aspect ratio (region 2 and 4). Special features on the DVD include four commentary tracks—"Real Me" by writer David Fury and director David Grossman; "Fool for Love" by writer Doug Petrie; "I Was Made to Love You" by writer Jane Espenson; and "The Body" by writer and director Joss Whedon. Scripts for "The Replacement", "Fool for Love", "Into the Woods", and "Checkpoint" are included. Featurettes include, "Buffy Abroad", which details the international popularity of the show; "Demonology: A Slayer's Guide", a featurette presented by Danny Strong showcasing the various demons on the show; "Casting Buffy", which details the casting process of all the main actors; "Action Heroes!: The Stunts of Buffy" details the stunts and features behind-the-scenes footage with the stunt actors; "Natural Causes", a featurette on the episode "The Body"; "Spotlight on Dawn" details the introduction of the character and interview with actress Michelle Trachtenberg; and "The Story of Season 5", a 30-minute featurette where cast and crew members discuss the season. Also included are series outtakes, Buffy video game trailer, photo galleries, and DVD-ROM content.
