= Faith, Hope & Trick =

- Buffy the Vampire Slayer episode
- Episode no.: Season 3 Episode 3
- Directed by: James A. Contner
- Written by: David Greenwalt
- Production code: 3ABB03
- Original air date: October 13, 1998

Guest appearances
- Kristine Sutherland as Joyce Summers; K. Todd Freeman as Mr. Trick; Fab Filippo as Scott Hope; Jeremy Roberts as Kakistos; Eliza Dushku as Faith Lehane; Armin Shimerman as Principal Snyder; John Ennis as Manager

Episode chronology
← Previous "Dead Man's Party"	Next → "Beauty and the Beasts"
- Buffy the Vampire Slayer season 3

"Faith, Hope & Trick" is the third episode of season three of the television show Buffy the Vampire Slayer. This episode introduces the character Faith, another vampire slayer, who will become a key player in Sunnydale. While the rest of the gang gets to know Faith, Giles suspects that Faith and Buffy aren't being entirely honest about recent events in their lives. Some new vampires arrive in Sunnydale with their own agendas and a familiar face returns. It was written by David Greenwalt, directed by James A. Contner, and first broadcast on The WB on October 13, 1998.

== Plot ==
Kakistos and his colleague Mr. Trick arrive in town, discussing how they will kill the slayer. Having been overruled by the school board, Principal Snyder reluctantly allows Buffy to return to the school on the condition that she make up for the classes she missed. Buffy and Willow go to the library, where Giles questions Buffy about what happened the night she killed Angel and defeated Acathla, ostensibly to help him with a binding spell to prevent the demon from being resurrected.

That night at the Bronze, fellow student Scott Hope attempts to talk to Buffy, but she becomes distracted by a suspected vampire leading a girl outside. Buffy and the rest of the group watch as the girl kills the vampire. The girl introduces herself as Faith, a new vampire slayer. Cordelia realizes that the death of Kendra, a previous slayer, must have activated Faith. The group and Buffy's mother Joyce take a liking to Faith, but Buffy remains skeptical. Kakistos and Trick plot revenge on Faith for mutilating Kakistos' face.

That night, while the slayers are patrolling together, they are attacked by vampires. While Buffy struggles with several vampires, Faith focuses only on one, beating the vampire repeatedly instead of helping Buffy. Giles tells Buffy the vampires were working for Kakistos, an ancient vampire with cloven hands and feet. After leaving the library, Buffy runs into Scott, who tries to ask her out on a date. Buffy accepts, but she runs away very disturbed when Scott hands her a Claddagh ring like the one Angel gave her. Giles tells Buffy that Faith's watcher is dead, not at a retreat center as Faith had said.

Buffy goes to see Faith at her motel room and tells her Kakistos is in town. Faith tells Buffy that Kakistos murdered her watcher some weeks earlier in Boston and he swore revenge on her for mutilating him with an axe. As Faith tries to leave, Kakistos and a group of vampires break into the room. Buffy and Faith escape through a window, but are driven into Kakistos' lair. Buffy fights and slays many of the vampires while Kakistos attacks Faith. Eventually, Faith impales Kakistos with a large beam, killing him. Trick flees with another vampire.

Inspired by Faith standing up to her fears and conquering them, Buffy finally reveals to Giles and Willow that Angel was cured when she killed him. Although she is skeptical that the information will help with a binding spell, Buffy feels better for having told them. After Buffy leaves, Willow approaches Giles to offer her help with the spell, but Giles tells her that there is no spell; he wanted Buffy to open up about what happened between her and Angel.

Buffy talks to Scott and, after explaining her reaction to the ring, they make plans to go out. She returns to the mansion where she killed Angel. Buffy places her Claddagh ring on the ground and says goodbye. After she leaves, the ring starts to vibrate and Angel returns from hell.

== Writing ==
"Faith, Hope, & Trick" introduces the minor character Mr. Trick. After Principal Robin Wood and Kendra, he is the longest-running character of color in the series, with 5 appearances. According to Elyce Rae Helford, in an unusually long speech for such a minor character, he "overtly clarifies the racial metaphor underlying the show's narrative by comparing African Americans in Washington, D.C., with vampires in Sunnydale and by conceiving both as equivalent examples of 'darkness'".

== Cultural references ==
Buffy complains to Joyce, "I’m the one getting Single White Femaled here." This is a reference to the 1992 movie Single White Female, which starred Jennifer Jason Leigh and Bridget Fonda as roommates. Leigh’s character, who is obsessive and manipulative, exhibiting borderline personality disorder, begins to copy every aspect of Fonda's life and take over her persona.

== Reception ==
Vox ranked it at #50 of all 144 episodes on their "Every Episode Ranked From Worst to Best" list, writing, "Now Faith is here, and things can really get started."

Noel Murray of The A.V. Club enjoyed the characterizations: "If the first two episodes of Season Three showed anything, it's that our core ensemble has become nicely rounded-out since the end of Season Two. With Oz in the picture, Joyce in the know, and Cordelia much less dim, there's more functional members of the slaying circle, which leads to a more complicated and entertaining rhythm to the interplay. ... Everyone is at their sharpest, wittiest, and friendliest. They're a pleasure to be around. So, naturally, Joss Whedon and company decide to shake things up." He praises how the Buffy team keeps "the season's master-plot moving swiftly ... They're ratcheting up the intensity awfully quick here."

Billie Doux, giving a rating of 3 stakes out of 4, calls the episode "well balanced and a lot of fun." She discusses Faith as a "threatening" and "darker version of Buffy" who invades every facet of Buffy's life. She admires the second new character, writing, "Mr. Trick is a hoot, especially in the drive-through scene and the pizza delivery scene. He's a modern, practical vampire with computer skills. No vengeance gigs for him." Above all, "The best part of this episode is the way Giles subtly maneuvers Buffy into talking about what happened with Angel." She also notes some new details, among them:

- Joyce learns that Buffy died in "Prophecy Girl."
- It is established that vamps do not need an invitation to enter motel rooms.
- Angel tends to be wearing white whenever he bleeds.
- "There is a Watcher's retreat every year in the Cotswolds, and Giles is not invited," although he should now be "the most important Watcher in the world."

Mark Oshiro examines at some length how the introduction of Faith "piggybacks on the emotions of "Dead Man's Party." Buffy had already dealt with feelings of inadequacy, and suddenly someone arrives in her life who can seemingly do everything she can do better, and all her friends and family are excited about this."
