= Glory (Buffy the Vampire Slayer) =

- Buffy the Vampire Slayer character
- Clare Kramer as Glory
- First appearance: "No Place Like Home" (2000)
- Last appearance: "Lessons" (2002)
- Created by: Joss Whedon; Douglas Petrie
- Portrayed by: Clare Kramer

In-universe information
- Classification: Goddess
- Notable powers: Superhuman strength, speed, near-invulnerability, and immortality

Glory is a fictional character in the television series Buffy the Vampire Slayer portrayed by Clare Kramer. Glory was a god from a hell dimension and was the major antagonist of the fifth season. She appeared first in episode 5 and made appearances in 12 other episodes throughout the season. She made a further brief appearance in the first episode of season 7. Clare's performance has had a long-lasting impact on Buffy culture that she often hosts events and engages in guest speaking appearances all over the world to this day.

== Character biography ==
=== History ===
Glorificus (also known as "Glory") is a god from a hell dimension ruled by three hell gods. Fearful that Glorificus would seize total control of the dimension for herself, the two other gods aligned and banished her into the earthly dimension, where her essence is imprisoned in a human child named Ben, portrayed by Charlie Weber.

Glory's strength is greater than that of any Slayer, vampire, or antagonist previously shown as a season villain of Buffy, but her powers are weak when compared to those she had in her home dimension. Dark magicks prevent humans in the Buffy universe from learning that Glory and Ben are the same; even if she transforms right in front of someone, they have no memory of the incident. The spell does not affect supernatural characters like vampires and demons. This flaw becomes a recurring joke in the penultimate episode of season 5, where Spike finds himself repeatedly having to explain that Ben and Glory are the same person, only for people to either misunderstand him or forget about it instantly. As Ben and Glory's personalities begin to merge more, the magic weakens until, in the finale, the whole gang sees through it. This human form is Glory's only weakness; if the human vessel containing her is killed, then Glory perishes with him.

Glory's goal through her time onscreen is to find the Key, a "mystical energy nexus," which is the only way for her to return to her original dimension. Using the Key will break down the barriers between all dimensions, causing all worlds to bleed into each other and allowing "Hell to reign on Earth". The Key was safeguarded by an ancient group of monks known as The Order of Dagon. When they discovered that "The Beast" (Glory) was searching for the Key, they chose to hide it by transforming the Key into a human girl. They placed her under the protection of the Slayer Buffy, altering the memories of the Slayer and anyone connected to her into believing the girl was Buffy's younger sister Dawn. Glory eventually destroys the Order of Dagon and interrogates the last monk until he reveals to Glory (under torture) that the Key has been transformed, but not what the Key has become. After being rescued by Buffy, the monk reveals to Buffy that Dawn is the Key, something she already suspected.

Glory is also opposed by a military order known as the "Knights of Byzantium," composed of knights and clerics, who appear in episode 12 of season 5. They swear to prevent Glory from using the Key, and they attempt to kill Dawn before she can be found by Glory. In the 20th episode of the season, "Spiral," a large group of knights besieges Buffy and Dawn, but Glory arrives and slaughters nearly all of them, taking the Key with her. This episode marks the last appearance of the Knights of Byzantium.

=== The Key ===
The Key is an ancient power, described as "an ancient green mystical energy" that, according to Glory, "is almost as old as she is." Who or what created the Key or how is unknown; even its true purpose is never fully revealed. The Key seems to work by destroying the barriers that separate one dimension from another. The longer the Key is in use, the more the walls of reality begin to break down. When the Key is activated in the last episode of season 5, a small portal opens and begins to grow, in which demons, creatures, and entire dimensions begin to immediately bleed through.

Buffy's first confrontation with Glory comes shortly after she discovers there is something not right about Dawn. Glory beats Buffy severely, destroying an entire building in the process. Buffy manages to escape during an outburst by Glory, which caused the building to collapse. She escapes with the last surviving monk who quickly reveals the truth about Dawn being the Key and Buffy her protector.

=== Sunnydale ===
Although Glory enters early on in season 5, the Scooby Gang knows very little about her, only discovering her name from one of Glory's minions. Glory's god-like status, extreme power level, origins, and the Key's true nature and history are not known until later episodes. Glory comes to Sunnydale looking for "The Key," which will allow her to return to her own dimension.

She begins the quest to locate the Key, aided by a race of pale, black-eyed demons who are loyal to her almost to a fault, though she does not care for them and viciously abuses them. Glory quickly establishes herself as one of Buffy's most dangerous and determined enemies. At one point, she confronts Buffy in her own home, openly threatening to kill Buffy's friends and family and force Buffy to watch her do so.

Glory is a god in a human body; the human mind can not control such power, which gradually turns Glory insane. To maintain her sanity and power, Glory feeds off humans' mental energies through a process that Buffy and her friends refer to as "brain-sucking". She inserts her fingers into the victim's head, absorbing the energies that bind the victim's mind. The humans that she "devours" in this way become incoherent and mentally unstable and can also see Dawn in her true form. One of her unfortunate victims is Willow's girlfriend, Tara, who later inadvertently betrays Dawn to Glory. The Scoobies (Buffy and her friends) try to run, but Glory still manages to kidnap Dawn shortly afterward.

The Key can only be used at a certain time, and as that time draws near, the power that separates Glory from Ben dissolves. Both characters still inhabit Ben's body separately, but their memories and personalities begin to blur together.

After recovering from a mental breakdown caused by Glory's kidnapping of Dawn, Buffy decides to attack Glory with everything she has: Willow's magic spell to restore Tara's sanity, at the same time weakening Glory's mind; the Dagon Sphere (a weapon created by the monks that cause physical pain to Glory); Buffy's robot double (the "Buffybot"), originally Spike's sex toy; Olaf, The Troll God's Hammer (with which Buffy can beat Glory in battle and severely weaken her albeit temporarily, due to the hammer being a weapon of the gods); and eventually a wrecking ball, commandeered by Xander. Glory is left defeated and significantly weakened, losing her hold on this reality and returning to the form and mind of Ben. Buffy then tells Ben to tell Glory to leave Sunnydale and never return. As Buffy walks off, Giles knows that Glory will eventually regain her power and return to get her revenge on Buffy unless Ben is killed, so he smothers Ben to death with his bare hands, ensuring that Glory can never return.

After Glory's defeat, her final appearance in the series is at the end of the episode "Lessons," as an avatar of the First Evil along with most of the other major villains from the series.

== Name ==
"That Which Cannot Be Named" came into existence before written word, and therefore (as its title implies) has no name. When the hell-god came to this dimension, she was dubbed "Glorificus" or sometimes "Glorifius" by her demon minions and in most textual references, is shortened to "Glory." She was also known by her minions as "the Glorious One" (among many other amusing, groveling titles such as "Her Splendiferousness," "Her Sparkling Luminescence" and "Oh Sweaty-Naughty-Feelings-Causing One"), and as "the Beast" or "the Abomination" by the human priesthood and the Knights of Byzantium. (She has nothing to do with The Beast who appeared in Angel, the spin-off series of Buffy the Vampire Slayer). The Scooby Gang and Ben often refer to her by the insulting name of "Hell-Bitch."

According to Buffy writer Jane Espenson, Glory was originally named Cherry.

== Powers and abilities ==
In season 5, episode 13, "Blood Ties," the gang begins discussing the Watcher Council's research on Glory. Buffy asks whether or not Glory, as a god, can summon elements like lightning. Giles responds, "Normally, yes, but since she is in human form, her powers are severely limited." During season 5 the following were demonstrated:

- Near-invulnerability: Only a Troll God's hammer was able to do any lasting damage to Glory when used repeatedly. In "Tough Love," Willow's lightning bolts caused her pain, but caused no visible damage, though she comments that Willow's assault "slowed her down". By the time of the season finale, Buffy mentions that Willow was the only one ever successful in actually hurting Glory up to that point. When a building collapses on top of her (see below), she was slowed down but was unharmed. Similarly, she was unharmed after being hit by a truck.
- Superhuman strength: Glory possesses enormous physical strength far beyond that of most, if not all, vampires, demons, or Slayers. She is considered to be the most physically powerful Big Bad in the series, shown to be able to inflict massive damage on her opponents through pure brute force and physical strength alone. In "Intervention", she kicked Spike clear across her living room, through a solid wooden door, and to the other end of the room after losing her patience with him. In "Tough Love", she squeezes Tara's hand to the point where it oozes blood, right before Glory feeds off of her brain. In "Spiral", she punches a hole through the barrier that Willow generated. Even Buffy, with her slayer strength, could barely stand toe-to-toe in a fight of brawn.
- Superspeed: Glory's super-speed is depicted as a fast-moving blur that is apparently invisible to the naked eye in the Buffy universe. This is seen when she pursues Buffy and Dawn immediately after Tara, in her insane state, accidentally reveals that Dawn is the Key.
- Brain sucking: The ability to drain the mental energy of humans. This is primarily to maintain her own mental strength, but would also prevent Ben's form from resuming control. Not only does the drain draw out all energy leaving the victims in an insane state, they are also able to visually see the Key's true energy and ultimately become psychically linked to Glory and the Key.
- Shroud of illusion: A mystical shroud cast to prevent people from learning that she and Ben are the same person, the origins of which are unclear. It only works on humans; vampires, demons, and other non-humans characters are immune. She loses this capability in the penultimate episode of season 5.
- Creature identification: The ability to differentiate between vampires, humans and any other creature from the Key, as seen in "Intervention", when her minions capture Spike under the mistaken impression that he is the Key.
- Omnilingualism: The ability to speak and understand any human or demon language. This power is shown when humans and demons talk to her in other languages and she understands.
- Magic: In "Shadow", Glory casts an ancient spell that causes an ordinary snake to grow to a massive size and grants it the ability to see the true form of the Key, in addition to making it completely loyal to her. According to Giles, a spell such as that would need enormous levels of magic to perform, and Glory cast it easily.

The extent of Glory's true powers as a hell-god were never revealed or used, though according to Gregor in "Spiral", they were beyond what even her compatriot hell-gods could conceive. She later secures Ben's aid in recapturing Dawn by promising him immortality.

== Personality ==
Clare Kramer, the actress who played Glory, said the character's best strength was her lack of self-doubt: "She was completely secure in herself, focused on what she wanted and dedicated to her cause." Her strength was also her downfall; Kramer notes that Glory was unable "to look at more than just herself."

According to Doug Petrie, "Joss very much wanted someone who was like the Joker to Batman. Someone who was just dynamic, charismatic and psychotic and we have all that. And Glory looks a lot better in a hot little red dress than the Joker ever did! We've got it all in Glory."

== Servants ==
- Dreg
- Jinx
- Murk
- Slook
- Gronx
- The High Priest Minion
- Doc

== Art and legacy ==
The picture in the living room of Glory's mansion is a copy of Tamara de Lempicka's Group of Four Nudes. The Polish art déco/futurist artist is renowned for being strongly feminist and openly bisexual/lesbian.

In the Buffy & Angel: Official Yearbook 2006, Glory was voted number one by fans as "Best Buffyverse Villain", followed by Angelus and the Mayor respectively.

== Appearances ==
=== Canonical appearances ===
Glory appeared in 13 canonical episodes:

- Season 5: "No Place Like Home" (first appearance); "Family"; "Shadow"; "Checkpoint"; "Blood Ties"; "I Was Made to Love You"; "Forever"; "Intervention"; "Tough Love"; "Spiral; "The Weight of the World"; "The Gift" (killed)
- Season 7: "Lessons" (as an incarnation of The First Evil)

== Merchandise ==
The character's popularity prompted Diamond Select Toys to release two unique Glory action figures in 2006 and 2007: one figure is modeled on the character wearing her trademark red dress, and the other features the character dressed in black, as seen in "The Gift." The latter action figure was released as part of a set, with the other figure being Dawn from the same episode.

A maquette of Glory was released as part of Electric Tiki's "Tooned-Up Television" line.

== See also ==
- List of Buffyverse Villains and Supernatural Beings
- Women warriors in literature and culture
- List of women warriors in folklore
