= Dead Man's Party (Buffy the Vampire Slayer) =

- Buffy the Vampire Slayer episode
- Episode no.: Season 3 Episode 2
- Directed by: James Whitmore, Jr.
- Written by: Marti Noxon
- Production code: 3ABB02
- Original air date: October 6, 1998

Guest appearances
- Kristine Sutherland as Joyce Summers; Nancy Lenehan as Pat; Armin Shimerman as Principal Snyder; Danny Strong as Jonathan Levinson; Jason Hall as Devon MacLeish; Paul Morgan Stetler as Young Doctor; Chris Garnant as Stoner #1

Episode chronology
← Previous "Anne"	Next → "Faith, Hope & Trick"
- Buffy the Vampire Slayer season 3

"Dead Man's Party" is the second episode of the third season of the television show Buffy the Vampire Slayer. It was written by Marti Noxon, directed by James Whitmore, Jr., and first broadcast on The WB on October 6, 1998.

Buffy struggles with life back in Sunnydale. Her problems with Angel, combined with the anger and distance of her friends and mother, only make things more difficult. However, everyone is eventually brought back together when a Nigerian mask that Joyce has acquired causes an army of zombies to rise up all over Sunnydale.

== Plot ==
Having returned home, Buffy and Joyce find things awkward between them as Joyce hangs up a Nigerian mask given by a gallery friend. At Giles' apartment, Buffy avoids most questions from her friends about her summer, while Giles hides his relief at her return.

The next day, Joyce takes Buffy to see Principal Snyder, who takes vindictive pleasure in refusing to lift her expulsion. Buffy meets the annoying Pat, a member of Joyce's book club, who comments on Buffy's recent behavior and its impact on Joyce. Buffy finds a dead cat in the basement and buries it in the garden. That night, the Nigerian mask's eyes glow red and the reanimated cat crawls out of the earth.

The return of the cat shocks Buffy and Joyce; Giles arrives to collect it for study. He notices the mask before having to remind Buffy that she is not allowed on school grounds. At school, Buffy's friends decide to throw her a party. The discussion distracts Giles from a page showing the Nigerian mask.

Overwhelmed by the noisy party, Buffy tries in vain to talk to Willow. She overhears Joyce telling Pat how tough Buffy's return has been on her. Combined with the coldness of her friends and the problems with school, Buffy decides it was a mistake to have come home and starts packing.

At the library, Giles is horrified by what he learns about the mask. He tries to call Buffy, but party-goers fail to relay the message. Driving to Buffy's house, Giles hits a man in the road, gets out of the car and finds the man to be a reanimated zombie. Giles barely escapes as bodies rise all over Sunnydale and are inexorably drawn to Joyce's mask.

Willow finds Buffy packing to leave and starts berating her for all the pain and worry she caused, explaining that she and the rest of the Scoobies had tough things to deal with as well. Buffy and Joyce argue in the midst of the party, and Xander sides with Joyce against Buffy, while Oz tries to break it up. As the argument grows heated, the revenants crash through the windows and doors, causing the Scoobies — even Joyce, who grabs a weapon — to quit arguing and band together to combat the threat. Several guests are killed. In the bedroom, Willow checks Pat's pulse and finds she is dead.

Giles tells Oz and Cordelia about the mask containing the powers of the zombie demon Ovu Mobani, which means "Evil Eye". Pat reanimates as a zombie and puts the mask on and becomes the demon incarnate. Buffy plunges a garden fork into Pat's eyes, causing her to vanish along with all the other zombies. The anger that Joyce and the other Scoobies felt towards Buffy dissipates.

The next day, Giles tries to convince Snyder to let Buffy return. When he refuses, Giles applies a little intimidation. In the coffee shop, Willow tells Buffy about her experiences dabbling in witchcraft. Buffy apologizes for not being there to support her, and Willow forgives her.

== Themes ==
Essayist Emily (last name not given) of the site InsectReflection.com discusses friendship, friendship done wrongly, and blame. First, she singles out "Anthony Steward Head's microexpressions. He cements his status as one of the show's truly elite actors as he is able to convey such depth of emotion with no words," then adds that he is the only sympathetic and sympathizing character here. "The central purpose of Dead Man's Party," she writes, "is to bring the main cast back together and tie up any emotional loose threads from the previous season."

[The Scoobies] are avoidant from the offset... They plan a party in her house that anyone who has spent five minutes with Buffy would know she does not want. Willow stands her friend up when they arrange to go for coffee, and later, when Buffy considers leaving again, rats her out to Joyce. Joyce embarrasses her daughter publicly, guilt-trips her for making the 'bad choice' of running away, and offers no regrets for being the one who actually kicked her out. Xander bitches about Buffy behind her back, sides with her mother, and scolds her as she is on the verge of tears. ... There is some amount of typical-Buffy-Summers emotional avoidance – her insistence that nobody could understand her pain while she stubbornly refuses to share that pain for example – but this only really comes out after the dogpiling in the living room begins – a dogpiling so overwhelming and severe that it would require saintliness to not become defensive in response to it.

She concludes, wryly, that "it is difficult to sympathise with the Scoobies' point of view when the episode itself has no interest in it."

== Reception ==
Rhonda Wilcox and David Lavery described "Dead Man's Party", in which Buffy attempts to reconnect with her mother and friends, as "one of the most uncomfortable episodes of the series". They wrote that the zombies represent the group's "failed attempts to bury their anger" at Buffy, and that they only achieve a partial catharsis by fighting alongside her. They quote Xander who says "you can't just bury stuff, Buffy, it will come right back to get you".

Vox ranked it at #47 of all 144 episodes on their "Every Episode Ranked From Worst to Best" list, writing, "It always hurts when the Scoobies fight, but it’s also always fantastic television: The characters are so well-defined that you can see each point of view clearly, and you get why each character firmly believes themselves to be correct." Similarly, Myles McNutt writes that it is "the sort of episode which is meant to be unpleasant, as characters hide their emotions from one another and it leads to a charged confrontation at episode’s end. I like the darkness inherent to this concept, as it places Buffy’s friends as the antagonists as she struggles to return to life in Sunnydale, but I would have much rather not been dealing with a silly Nigerian Zombie mask at the same time."

Reviewer Billie Doux gives a rating of 3 out of 4 stakes and points out, "The zombies and the Ovu Mobani Evil Eye demon/mask thing are a transparent metaphor for Buffy's situation that is even pointed out by Xander. Buried stuff is coming up, and masks hide what we feel." Roger Pocock writes, "As is so often the case with Buffy, the fantasy element is by far the least interesting aspect of the episode. A zombie attack is nothing new... But it’s the emotional conflict that is the really interesting aspect of the episode."

Mike Loschiavo suggests that the episode is rather slow, like its zombies, but beneficially: "While the show has been busy investigating real life teen troubles (and branching out into social woes this season), we needed an episode that showed us an oft-overlooked issue: consequences."

== Notes ==
1. Giles: "Buffy Summers is a minor, and is entitled to a public education. Your personal dislike of the girl does not legally entitle you to—" Snyder: "Why don't you take it up with the City Council?" Giles: "I thought I'd start with the State Supreme Court. You're powerful in local circles, but I believe I can make life very difficult for you, professionally speaking. And Buffy will be allowed back in." Snyder: "Sorry. I'm not convinced." [Giles shoves him back into his filing cabinet.] "Would you like me to convince you?"
