= Tara Maclay =

- Buffy the Vampire Slayer character
- Amber Benson as Tara Maclay in 2001
- First appearance: "Hush" (1999)
- Last appearance: "Villains" (2002)
- Created by: Joss Whedon
- Portrayed by: Amber Benson
- Voiced by: Amber Benson

In-universe information
- Affiliation: Scooby Gang
- Family: Donald Maclay (brother)
- Classification: Witch
- Notable powers: Magic

Tara Maclay is a fictional character created for the action-horror/fantasy television series Buffy the Vampire Slayer (1997–2003). She was developed by Joss Whedon and portrayed by Amber Benson. Tara is a shy young woman with magical talents who falls in love with Willow Rosenberg, one of the core characters. Together, they help Buffy Summers, who has been given superhuman powers, to defeat evil forces in the fictional town of Sunnydale.

Willow was a popular character when Tara was introduced, and the onset of their relationship was met with some resistance from fans. Tara grows from a reserved girl who is unsure of herself to being the moral center of Buffy's circle of friends, named the Scooby Gang. Her relationship with Willow is consistently positive, and the first recurring depiction of a lesbian couple on prime time network series television in the United States. Tara is killed by a stray gunshot toward the end of the sixth season, causing Willow to go on a rampage. Series writers and producers received angry protests from some fans when Tara was killed. Whedon upheld that it was the necessary course to take to propel Willow's story arc further; both the show's producers and Amber Benson deny that there was any malicious intent behind the decision. Tara was included in AfterEllen.com's Top 50 Lesbian and Bisexual Characters, ranking at No. 15.

The book The Bewitching Hour by Ashley Poston is a Tara prequel novel that fleshes out her character more and explains how she ended up at UC Sunnydale.

== Creation and casting ==
Tara is introduced in the fourth season episode "Hush" as a college student who attends a Wicca meeting where Willow Rosenberg (Alyson Hannigan) goes to find some like-minded people. Tara is hesitant to speak out during the meeting and has a pronounced stammer that returns throughout the series when she is upset. She reacts positively during the meeting to Willow's suggestion that the Wiccan group discuss spellcasting, but the rest of the group scoff at the suggestion and silence Tara and Willow. Tara was created to appear in only a few episodes as a friend with whom Willow could learn magic and develop her skills. Amber Benson had known Hannigan previously but did not tell her she was up for the part. Benson almost missed a callback audition because she left town, but the casting department postponed the session so she could return and read. When she did, Hannigan found her on set and upon learning she was up for the role, told Whedon to hire Benson at the same moment Benson got the call from her agent that she had won the part. Benson and Hannigan had such chemistry that the relationship was written to be more intimate. In "Hush", Tara and Willow each individually attempt to use magic to move a heavy object, without success. They then join hands and easily fling the object across the room. Whedon and the producers found the scene to be very sensual. Network executives also noticed the chemistry between the actresses. After some discussion, Whedon informed Benson and Hannigan that the characters would become lovers.

Willow was featured from the beginning of the series and already had a strong fanbase. Earlier in the fourth season, she had a boyfriend named Oz (Seth Green), who abruptly left town. Oz returns in the episode "New Moon Rising", determined to win Willow back. That episode marked the first time Tara is introduced to the Scooby Gang as a whole, and Willow is faced with choosing between Tara and Oz. She favors Tara in the end, causing some of the show's fans to react angrily on the fansite message boards, with some leaving homophobic remarks and characterizing Benson as overweight and unattractive. Benson, who was referred to as "astoundingly non-Hollywood" by a Scottish journalist, frequented the boards and read the comments, finding them hurtful and taking some of them personally. She responded, protesting that she was, at 5 feet 4 inches (1.63 m) and 118 pounds (54 kg), quite slender, although she appears larger than her more petite costars. She went on to write:

You can judge me and Tara for being "fat", "gay", and "shy". I suppose that my being on TV gives you that right. But I DO NOT have to read what you say. I have enjoyed being a lurker. But my feelings just can't take the criticism. Those of you (you know who you are) with sensitivity will understand. Thank you for sticking up for us. Tara and I both appreciate it. I think that being a beautiful, heavy, lesbian witch rocks! No matters what happens, I'm glad I get the chance to walk in Tara's shoes.

Network executives encouraged the lesbian element in the relationship, but put strict guidelines on what could be shown. Buffy scholar Jeffrey L. Pasley summarizes the planning behind the relationship:

Whedon chose to sidestep the "statement" opportunity presented by Willow's turn to homosexuality, even as Buffy the Vampire Slayer was celebrated in the gay and lesbian community for providing the first committed same-sex relationship in the history of series television. Well aware that they were breaking new ground and being closely watched, the Buffy braintrust elected to depict the relationship honestly but unsensationally, avoiding the prurient ballyhoo that had accompanied fleeting homosexual encounters in other series like Ally McBeal and Party of Five. "It would start to get coy and, quite frankly, a little offensive, for two people that much in love to not have any physicality," Whedon explained [to The A.V. Club (5 Sept. 2001)]. "But the whole mission statement was, 'We'll put it where nobody expects it, and we'll never talk about it.'" Sex between Willow and her lover Tara was implied now and then from "New Moon Rising" on, and Willow's best friends Buffy and Xander were allowed to feel briefly uncomfortable with her switch in sexual preference (The Yoko Factor). Yet by design the relationship was treated matter-of-factly, with little comment made on its lesbian nature and little overt change in the characters' behavior. Love was love, whatever the partners' gender, and indeed for a long period from the end of season 4 to the middle of season 6, Willow and Tara were the Buffyverse's happiest and most stable couple.

For several episodes in the fourth season, Tara and Willow's friendship grows as they practice magic. To work within the censorship imposed on their relationship, writers used allusions to spells and witchcraft to symbolize their affection and growing sexuality. Willow does not tell her friends about Tara for several episodes, instead just expressing the wish to spend time with Tara, where she can have something just for herself. Tara is unwaveringly supportive and committed to Willow.

== Seasons ==
=== 4 and 5 ===
When Tara and Willow meet, their proficiency at magic is about the same, but Tara's knowledge of the craft far exceeds Willow's. Tara reveals that she has been practicing magic for most of her life, as her deceased mother had also been a powerful witch. Throughout season 4, Tara acts as a partner and guide in Willow's witchcraft, teaching Willow spells and performing magic together. Willow, however, is inherently talented, despite being new to the craft, and begins to progress much faster than Tara in the fifth season, including experimentations in dark magic. Tara struggles with understanding her place among the Scoobies with Buffy (Sarah Michelle Gellar), the leader, with whom she has a very friendly relationship; Xander Harris (Nicholas Brendon), Willow's friend since childhood; and Rupert Giles (Anthony Stewart Head), their mentor. Tara's primary role throughout the series is that of Willow's partner. She feels somewhat useless until the fifth-season episode "Family" when the Scooby Gang makes it clear that she is unquestionably a part of them. The episode introduces some of Tara's blood family: a cold, authoritarian father who has lied to her all her life (telling her that her magical powers are a result of her being part-demon on her mother's side); an overbearing brother; and a judgmental, repressed and repressive cousin; all of whom Tara dismisses at the end of the episode. Tara later reveals in "The Body" that her mother had died when she was 17. In the following episode, when Dawn is acting out, Tara confides to Buffy that she had to deal with her brother after her mother's death. No more of her backstory is revealed in the series.

As Willow's character grows more self-assured and powerful through the seasons, Tara takes over some of the role of being placed in peril and needing to be rescued. The fifth season's primary villain, or Big Bad, is Glory, a goddess too powerful for Buffy to fight alone. Glory tortures Tara in order to gain information on the Key, but Tara asserts willpower and resists Glory, resulting in Glory stealing her sanity, and prompting Willow to go searching for retribution. Glory states she feels "buzzed" after feeding on Tara's mind, indicating Tara's powerful intellect (and possibly suggesting her power as a witch).

Buffy scholar Ian Shuttleworth writes that Benson was able to "admirably" portray the same range of emotions inherent in Tara although the character loses her identity. Willow's powers are significant enough that she is able to battle Glory more effectively than Buffy, if not completely successfully. In the final episode of season 5, Willow uses her magic to restore Tara's sanity, significantly weakening Glory in the process.

Tara also becomes a guide of sorts, and a maternal figure. She appears to Buffy in a dream in the fourth season finale "Restless" to tell her about the arrival of Buffy's sister Dawn (Michelle Trachtenberg) and act as a translator for the voiceless First Slayer. Following the death of Joyce Summers and Buffy's sacrifice to save the world at the end of the fifth season, Tara and Willow move into the Summers house, taking Joyce's bedroom and becoming Dawn's surrogate parents.

=== 6 and comics ===
Tara becomes more outspoken during the sixth season about the ethics of Willow's use of magic, cautioning Willow that she depends too much on it. The dynamics of their relationship suddenly turn during "Once More, with Feeling". Willow had cast a spell on Tara to alter her memory in the preceding episode and Tara finds out about it during "Once More, with Feeling", the musical episode of the series. Tara was given a prominent role in the musical due to the skill of Benson's voice: she sings a love ballad to Willow, a duet with Giles, and backup in two other songs. The musical nature of the episode compelled the characters to express what they had been feeling secretly, or had refused to admit to themselves. Tara's song is a fervent and explicit expression of love for Willow which she had not made clear to the audience until this point. Tara later sings with Giles that she will leave Willow if she does not change. Self-conscious about her singing abilities, Hannigan requested not to be given a song and sings only a few lines in the episode. Critics saw this as Tara's personality becoming more forceful as Willow begins to show signs of weakness as she is overtaken by her addiction. Tara challenges Willow to go for a week without using any magic. Willow almost immediately breaks her promise, however, and Tara leaves her at the end of "Tabula Rasa". Tara remains a part of the group, spending time with Dawn, and non-judgmentally acting as Buffy's confessor when Buffy divulges she has a painful and compulsive sexual relationship with Spike, a vampire whom she loathes.

Despite their separation, Tara remains devoted to Willow's recovery and supports her in her decision to abstain from using magic. She is, according to author Lorna Jowett, one of the few characters who is never seduced by evil. Shuttleworth notes that most Buffy characters go through a rite of transformation except for Tara. Among female characters she is the most virtuous. Like the other Buffy characters in the series whose names have symbolic interpretations, Tara's name resembles the Latin terra, meaning "earth." She is solidly grounded, with Willow attached to her, and Benson's body more naturally representative of women. Tara is wholly feminine both in dress and demeanor, as opposed to Buffy and (less) Willow mostly dressed with trousers and jackets, but never seeks male approval. She is clad in earthy, natural colors, long flowing skirts and clinging blouses, with an intent to comfort instead of arouse as other women on the show are dressed. Her admonishments to other characters are always made with love, with their best interests at heart. Even Tara's last words, commenting that Willow's shirt is stained (with Tara's own blood), indicate her preoccupation with the welfare of others.

Tara has also appeared in The Long Way Home, Always Darkest, Retreat, and the one-off Willow.

== Death and response ==
After tentatively courting each other in "Entropy", Tara returns to Willow, and they reconcile through the next episode, "Seeing Red". Throughout the season, Buffy is dogged by three techno-nerds calling themselves The Trio, who envision themselves to be supervillains, with Buffy their nemesis. She continues to foil their plans, and during "Seeing Red", Warren Mears, one of the Trio, arrives at Buffy's house with a gun. He shoots several rounds, hitting Buffy, and the last stray shot hits Tara through the heart, killing her as Willow looks on. Willow is taken over by a dark alter ego, going on a rampage, torturing Warren and skinning him alive. She then attempts to murder the other two members of the Trio, but is unsuccessful. To end her pain, she attempts to end the world. Xander stops her by forcing her to deal with her grief in a healthy, non-violent way.

During the fifth season, Whedon informed Benson that Tara would be killed off. He saw it as necessary to further Willow's character; she had to deal with her dark powers, but nothing short of Tara's death would allow them to come out so forcefully. Tara had become popular among fans, and Whedon and series writer David Fury decided that her death would elicit a strong response, something that Whedon felt sure was the correct course to take. He was unprepared, however, for how forcefully viewers reacted to Tara's death. Fans were so upset that some stopped watching. Because the death came at the end of an episode where Willow and Tara were portrayed in bed between sexual encounters, critics accused Whedon of implying that lesbian sex should be punishable by death, a familiar trope in film. Producers were inundated with mail from people—women especially—who expressed their anger, sadness, and frustration with the writing team. Series writer and producer Marti Noxon was unable to read some of the mail because it was so distressing, but she counted the response as a natural indication that television simply had few strong female role models, and no lesbian representation.

Benson defended Whedon in 2007, saying he "is 100 percent behind the LGBT community. I know this for a fact." Author Rhonda Wilcox writes that Tara's death is made more poignant by her earthy naturalness representing the "fragility of the physical". Roz Kaveney comments that Tara's murder is "one of the most upsetting moments of the show's seven seasons", and Nikki Stafford states that the episode in which Tara dies is possibly the most controversial of the series, causing divisions about whether it was necessary, or assertions that Tara was created only to be killed. In response to fans and critics who accused the writers of being motivated by homophobia, Stafford comments, "they seem to forget that it was those same writers who created such an amazing, gentle, and realistic portrait in the first place; that Tara is certainly not the first character to be killed off on the show; and Tara was a lot more than just 'the lesbian', and her character deserves better than that." Kaveney concurs with the opinion that the series avoided playing a cliché, "proving that it is possible for a queer character to die in popular culture without that death being the surrogate vengeance of the straight world".

While other deaths of main characters in the Buffy universe have been reversed in some form (as has been the case with Buffy herself, Cordelia, Giles, Angel, Spike, Anya, Connor, Gunn, Fred, Illyria and Wesley), Tara remains dead as of the season 10 comic series. She remains one of only three main characters not to have been resurrected in any way, the others being Doyle and Lorne (whose actors have died).

== Cultural impact ==
=== Viewer response ===
Although lesbianism had been addressed on U.S. television before Tara was introduced to Buffy, her relationship with Willow was heralded as a milestone. Previously depicted lesbian relationships had not shown characters as sexual beings, or even touching each other. Despite this, Tara and Willow's relationship was not heralded with any specific fanfare on the show; they are treated as other couples. Their relationship was frequently the subject of storylines, but no specific focus was on their identity as lesbians or the coming out process. Limited to what could be shown by the network, Tara and Willow are shown as consistently affectionate but not overly sexual. Manda Scott in The Herald wrote in 2002 that the lack of realistic displays of touching or kissing between Willow and Tara made their relationship implausible, but because no other portrayals of lesbian relationships were on television, its importance is undeniable. Tara and Willow did not kiss until the fifth-season episode "The Body", which focused on the death of Joyce Summers. Not until Buffy moved from The WB to UPN in 2001 were Tara and Willow shown in sexual situations. Benson later recalled the issues of working with censors:

There was a big kerfuffle—they didn’t want us kissing on the show, and Alyson and I were both like, “Hey, this is bull[shit]. We should be able to kiss." And it was only after one of the crew members, who was gay, took us aside and said, "Hey, just the fact that the characters are having this positive relationship and they're being portrayed as normal human beings—who just happen to be two women in love—that what's important, not the physical stuff." So, it was really just about saying hey we are two people and we are in this relationship and we are functioning like normal people. Just having a normal relationship, I think, that's the biggest thing that we did.

Like Whedon, Benson was surprised at the strength of the reaction to Tara's death. It indicated to her what kind of impact the characters had:

I thought I was on some science fiction show. I had no clue I was going to have some sort of impact on a whole group of people... Alyson and I would get letters, and you don't realize the impact you're making until you really start thinking about it. When kids come up and say, "I didn't kill myself because of Buffy and your relationship," it blows your mind. It wasn't about two women making out. It was about two women who fell in love with each other and happened, just happened, to have the same genitalia.

The Big Bad of the seventh season is the First Evil, who taunts Buffy and her friends by appearing as loved ones who previously died. Whedon asked Benson to appear as Tara to Willow in "Conversations with Dead People", but Benson turned down the role, concerned about what fans of the show would think about an evil Tara. Instead, the producers used Cassie, a character who dies early in the seventh season and speaks for Tara, telling Willow to kill herself. Whedon also considered bringing Tara back in a storyline where Buffy would be given one wish to be granted, but the possibility did not come to fruition.

Writer Peg Aloi calls the backlash at Whedon "staggering", and summarizes Tara's effect with Willow, stating that they were a single unit the moment they met: "Willow's need for approval and Tara's need for unconditional love allowed their supernova trajectory its singular, incendiary thrust toward its triumphant but tragic end; like all witches who burn, martyred by flames, they move on to a place where their gods are the right ones."

=== Political aspects ===
As a show with an obvious feminist agenda, Buffy and its female characters at times represent, or provoke questions and conversation about, such political and economic themes as gender roles, implicit stereotypes, in-groups and out-groups, and, with Tara's appearance on the show, sexuality and gender identity-based cultures. Politics is, to paraphrase Buffy's comment to Quentin Travers in "Checkpoint," about power: who has it and who does not. Tara frequently does not; before she meets Willow, that is, and during her suffering from Glory's assault. It can be argued, as by the writers here, that simply by virtue of her attachment to Willow she is endangered by characters including Glory and by powers external to the Buffyverse including Mutant Enemy.

Pasley, the Buffy scholar, writes of the cultural climate coexistent with the show's original run and its later, lasting fandom,

Joss Whedon's basically apolitical intentions showed in his obvious surprise at the bitter, politically charged reaction to Tara's death... Though rooted primarily in the anguish viewers felt over the death of a beloved character, the criticism converged on the idea that Whedon had lapsed into the "Dead/Evil Lesbian Cliché," a subset of the broader pop culture cliché in which a minority character is introduced only to be killed or turned into a villain.

The term "Dead/Evil Lesbian Cliché" was ideated and popularized by members of a forum, "The Kitten, The Witches and the Bad Wardrobe," following the events of "Seeing Red". Their arguments and conclusions led to an online FAQ page, "The Death of Tara, the Fall of Willow and The Dead/Evil Lesbian Cliché FAQ." Among other topics, the FAQ analyzes the forensics and metaphors of Tara's death and Willow's descent into vengeance. Among their statements: "Tara attracted many fans who are marginalized in society because they are shy or gay or stuttered or all three," and the Cliché is "likely to increase the incidence of homophobia in society, and make gays and lesbians of all ages feel unwelcome and disliked."

In his piece "The Tara Controversy," Pasley wrote,

Recognition of the cliché was quite widespread by the spring of 2002 thanks to a highly entertaining documentary called The Celluloid Closet (1995) that happened to be showing frequently on cable television. Full of alternately hilarious and chilling clips from old movies that few Buffy viewers were likely to have encountered, the documentary gave the impression that every third film made in the 50s and 60s featured a predatory lesbian villain or a tortured young woman, often trying to "go straight" after falling inadvertently into lesbianism, who dies tragically in the last reel. ... [But] Tara had been on the show for almost three years, so she could hardly be seen as mere cannon fodder. The elements of self-loathing and violence that the Celluloid Closet films associated with homosexuality were never shown to be part of Willow and Tara's relationship. The two characters' story arc showed the women becoming more confident and powerful as an acknowledged couple than they had been before. The Evil/Dead Lesbian Cliché generally involves a partner killing herself or her lover, but Willow's murderous rage was directed outward at her lover's murderer.

Pasley considers the liability held by Mutant Enemy, too:

Perhaps the worst mistake that Whedon and his writers made was waiting until Tara's last episode to actually picture her naked in bed with Willow and then having the murder occur immediately after, thus apparently linking death with a homosexual act. That put it close enough to the Celluloid Closet paradigm to bring many politically minded critics and fans down hard on Buffy the Vampire Slayer and destroy much of the political cachet it had acquired since Tara came on the show. Suddenly denounced in many quarters where he had previously been a darling (liberal-leaning pop culture journals, Buffy fan websites, the gay press), Joss Whedon expressed dismay that his reluctantly made decision to kill off Tara "made people I actually like angry... it didn't anger a bunch of morons." His response to the criticism was to spell out more clearly than ever that his shows have no intentional political messages to deliver. "I never court controversy," Whedon told E! Online. "I don't really care about issues. I didn't care about the one I introduced with Tara, and I didn't care about the one when I killed her. I cared about narrative and what I needed to do to Willow." What he needed to do at that point was turn an enraged, recolored, magically supercharged Willow into the show's primary villain for the last few episodes ("Villains," "Two to Go," and "Grave")...

== General and cited references ==
- Holder, Nancy; Mariotte, Jeff; Hart, Maryelizabeth (2000). Buffy the Vampire Slayer: The Watcher's Guide, Volume 2, Pocket Books. ISBN 0-671-04260-2
- Jowett, Lorna (2005). Sex and the Slayer: A Gender Studies Primer for the Buffy Fan, Wesleyan University Press. ISBN 978-0-8195-6758-1
- Kaveney, Roz (ed.) (2004). Reading the Vampire Slayer: The New, Updated, Unofficial Guide to Buffy and Angel, Tauris Parke Paperbacks. ISBN 1-4175-2192-9
- Mitchell, Claudia; Reid-Walsh, Jacqueline (2008). Girl Culture: Studying Girl Culture — A Readers' Guide, ABC-CLIO. ISBN 0-313-33909-0
- Ruditis, Paul (2004). Buffy the Vampire Slayer: The Watcher's Guide, Volume 3, Simon & Schuster. ISBN 0-689-86984-3
- Stafford, Nikki (2007). Bite Me! The Unofficial Guide to Buffy the Vampire Slayer, ECW Press. ISBN 978-1-55022-807-6
- Tropiano, Stephen (2002). Prime Time Closet: A History of Gays and Lesbians on TV, Applause Theater and Cinema Books. ISBN 1-55783-557-8
- Wilcox, Rhonda (2005). Why Buffy Matters: The Art of Buffy the Vampire Slayer, I. B. Tauris. ISBN 1-84511-029-3
- Yeffeth, Glenn (ed.) (2003). Seven Seasons of Buffy: Science Fiction and Fantasy Authors Discuss Their Favorite Television Show, Benbella Books. ISBN 1-932100-08-3
