= Dawn Summers =

Buffy the Vampire Slayer character

- Buffy the Vampire Slayer character
- Michelle Trachtenberg as Dawn Summers in 2002
- First appearance: "Buffy vs. Dracula" (2000)
- Last appearance: Finale (2003)
- Created by: Joss Whedon
- Portrayed by: Michelle Trachtenberg

In-universe information
- Affiliation: Scooby Gang
- Classification: Human (formerly: non-sentient magical energy)

Dawn Summers is a fictional character created by Joss Whedon and introduced by Marti Noxon and David Fury on the television series Buffy the Vampire Slayer, portrayed by Michelle Trachtenberg. She made her debut in the premiere episode of the show's fifth season and subsequently appeared in every episode of its remaining three seasons. Within the series, Dawn is the younger sister of main character Buffy Summers (Sarah Michelle Gellar), a girl chosen by fate to be a vampire Slayer. Whedon introduced Dawn to the series because he wanted to introduce a character with whom Buffy could have an intensely emotional non-romantic relationship.

After years of foreshadowing, Dawn was introduced at the start of the fifth season as part of a large in-story retcon: Characters accepted Dawn's presence as if she had always been there, and as if Buffy always had a sister, with only the audience aware that this was not the case. As the series went on, the significance of Dawn's arrival is revealed to the series's other characters, and they come to understand that she has not always been Buffy's sister, or indeed a sentient being; Dawn had originally been the mystical "key" to unlocking dimensions and was made into Buffy's sister so the Slayer would protect her. Dawn is, however, a real girl, Buffy's biological sister, and has real memories of her fictional childhood. She struggles in a very human way when she discovers the truth about her origins and later endures problems with self-harm and kleptomania. The show's sixth and seventh seasons, as well as its canonical comic book continuation, follow Dawn's journey toward adulthood.

== Appearances ==
=== Television ===
Dawn Summers is first introduced as Buffy's (Sarah Michelle Gellar) younger sister at the end of Buffy season 5 premiere "Buffy vs. Dracula", though Buffy had been previously established as an only child. Initially, the mystery of Dawn's sudden existence is not acknowledged in the series, with the other characters accepting her as a part of the status quo. Four episodes later, Buffy discovers Dawn is, in fact, a mystical object known as The Key; a group of monks transformed The Key into human form and sent it to the Slayer for protection from the villainous Glory (Clare Kramer). The memories of Buffy and her associates were altered, along with relevant records, so that they believed her to have always existed as Buffy's sister. She is shown to look up greatly to Willow and Tara and has a crush on Xander. She also is friendly with Spike, who is as protective of her as Buffy herself. When Dawn learns of her origin, she suffers existential crisis that causes her self-harm and runs away from home, until Buffy assures her, they are real sisters no matter what, securing it with a blood oath. Her relationship with Buffy, having been portrayed with a typical sister dynamic in the first half of the season, changes when she discovers what she is. The two become closer as Dawn becomes Buffy's sole focus once she drops out from college to protect her, going as far as to warn her friends she is prepared to kill anyone who attempts to go near Dawn in the finale.

Dawn suffers more pain when her mother (Kristine Sutherland) dies unexpectedly from a brain aneurysm, which leads to Dawn resorting to black magic to try to bring her back from the grave, an action she immediately reverses upon realizing the consequences of her actions. It is eventually revealed that Dawn's purpose as The Key is to open portals to alternate dimensions — a power the hell-god Glory wishes to exploit to return home. When Glory successfully uses Dawn's blood to break down the dimensional barriers, Buffy sacrifices her own life (realizing that their blood is now the same) to end the apocalypse and save Dawn; Buffy's sacrifice also neutralizes the power of The Key, giving Dawn the opportunity of a normal life. Seeking a purpose for her existence, Dawn chooses to join Buffy's friends to protect the world against evil.

The following season opening sees Dawn struggle with abandonment issues, as well as her escalating kleptomania. Having been devastated by her sister's death, Dawn is overjoyed when Willow (Alyson Hannigan) casts a spell to bring her back to life. However, with Buffy spiraling into a deep depression, Dawn feels highly neglected and is often seen alone and seeking attention from her sister, as well as other members of the group. She later experiences her first kiss with a vampire named Justin, whom she is reluctantly forced to stake (her first vampire kill) when he tries to turn her. Dawn's isolation from the other characters reaches its apex in "Older and Far Away," when she inadvertently makes a wish to the vengeance demon Halfrek (Kali Rocha), which results in trapping everyone who enters the Summers house. Halfrek herself is inadvertently trapped, and undoes the curse to free herself; meanwhile, Dawn's kleptomania and feelings of neglect by her friends and family are exposed. Buffy vows to mend their relationship and starts spending more time with her sister, whilst still trying to shield her from her life as a Slayer, much to Dawn's disappointment, as she is eager to help Buffy in her duties. While helping Buffy battle demons in the season finale, Dawn proves herself to be capable in a fight, finally earning her sister's respect and a promise to train her.

In the final season, Dawn becomes more grown-up and a full-fledged member of the "Scooby Gang" — as witnessed in the first few episodes when she aids Buffy and Xander during Willow's absence, and is trained by Buffy in combat. When Buffy expresses her doubts about her first day as a guidance counselor at the newly rebuilt Sunnydale High in the episode "Help", Dawn assures her that she'll be fine and that she'll be a great counselor. Falling victim to a love spell in the episode "Him", Dawn displays dangerous behavior such as attacking people and trying to commit suicide to prove her "love" for classmate RJ Brooks. While home alone one night, Dawn is forced to perform a solo exorcism to protect what she believes to be her mother from a demon, though it is revealed to be The First Evil attempting to cause Dawn to doubt her bond with Buffy, which she does for several episodes following this. Dawn's feelings of neglect begin to resurface as Buffy spends time training the potentials now living in their home. After wrongly believing herself to be a Potential Slayer, Xander (Nicholas Brendon) explains to Dawn that being normal is perhaps the hardest burden of all, as nobody understands the pain of being overlooked — as he has been in Dawn's shoes. Dawn then falls into a watcher-esque role offering the group answers from research, such as ways to communicate with The Bringers and translating texts given to Buffy in a 'slayer keepsake'. When Buffy tricks her into leaving town before the impending apocalypse, Dawn adamantly returns to fight against the First, during which she battles alongside Xander, and once again proves her value as a fighter by killing several Ubervamps and survives.

Dawn was intended to appear in the Angel episode "The Girl in Question", but Michelle Trachtenberg was unavailable for filming, so Andrew Wells (played by Tom Lenk) replaced her.

=== Literature ===
In the comic book Buffy Season Eight, Dawn goes through a series of bizarre physical changes.

In the canonical comic book continuation to the television series Buffy the Vampire Slayer Season Eight (2007–2011), it is revealed that Buffy and Dawn's relationship has been strained and conflicted since the events of "Chosen." Dawn is revealed to have been cursed, apparently as a result of sleeping with a "thricewise demon" named Kenny while a college student, and is a giant. Throughout her affliction she spends a lot of time with Xander, to whom she reveals she was cursed as a result of cheating on Kenny with his roommate. While her personal issues are made to take a backseat with Buffy, in battles, her gigantism shows some utility; she is able to assist fighting Amy in "The Long Way Home", and rampages through Tokyo to distract their enemies in "Wolves at the Gate". In "Time of Your Life, Part One" she shrinks to normal size again, but then turns into a centaur. Xander surmises she will likely experience a third such transformation before she can return to normal. In "Living Doll", the twenty-fifth issue of the series, Dawn undergoes a transformation into a living doll and is kidnapped by a disturbed dollmaker for her 'protection'. After her sister, Andrew and Willow track down Kenny, he later appears to undo the curse, and the two have a heart-to-heart, where Dawn apologises for her infidelity and explains she had been unprepared for the seriousness of her feelings for Kenny. She subsequently spends some time bonding with Buffy. Dawn and Xander's growing friendship leads to them kissing, where they are discovered by Buffy, in "Retreat". In the series' final arc, Buffy brings about the end of magic, following which Xander and Dawn decide to settle down in San Francisco. They allow Buffy to live with them until she finds her own place.

Season Nine (2012–13) begins with Dawn and Xander living an ordinary domestic life, with much less contact with Buffy than before since she has moved out. They intend to capitalize on a world without magic and embark upon a life of normalcy. Their relationship is seen to be going through some difficulties, such as when Xander forgets Dawn's birthday. Buffy also reflects that Dawn is not on her mind much of late. In "Welcome to the Team," Dawn becomes sick with what appears to be a very serious flu. Buffy also forgets about one of Dawn's allergies. In the concurrent second issue of spin-off series Willow: Wonderland, Willow sees a worrying omen about Dawn while in an alternate dimension. Later in the Buffy arc, Dawn begins to die and the gang recognise it is due to magic leaving her body. Buffy contacts Faith for help, but (as seen in Angel & Faith) neither she nor Angel can remember Dawn. Spike, however, heads straight from Faith's apartment in London to be by Dawn's side, and Willow returns to California with her powers restored and attempts to prolong Dawn's life. In final arc "The Core", Buffy, Willow and Xander head to the Deeper Well in England in hopes of finding enough magic to restore Dawn. Fearing for his memories, Spike tries to record himself talking about Dawn but the tapes all become static, indicating that everything Dawn affected is also fading. Dawn continues to rapidly fade until she disappears altogether. After the gang restart magic, they return to San Francisco where Willow is able to bring back Dawn using Buffy's blood in conjunction with the spell which created her. Willow expresses that something feels different as she brings Dawn back, and Xander is suspicious of Dawn's knowledge of very recent events. Buffy tries to tell Xander that he is being paranoid.

In Season Ten (2014–2016), Xander continues to be suspicious of Dawn, and insecure concerning their relationship. Buffy compares their behavior to that of her parents prior to their divorce. It is revealed that when Dawn was brought back she was reset emotionally. While she still remembers her relationship with Xander she does not feel love for him anymore and recently re-experienced her grief for her mother's death, among other traumas.

== Concept and creation ==
The arrival of Dawn Summers is foreshadowed in cryptic dream sequences in both the season 3 finale "Graduation Day, Part Two" and the season 4 episode "This Year's Girl", in which a still-comatose Faith says, while making a bed with Buffy in her bedroom, "Little sis coming, I know." Buffy replies, "So much to do before she gets here." (The first appearance of Dawn is in Buffy's room.) In the season 4 finale, "Restless", Tara warns Buffy to "be back before Dawn."

According to Buffy creator Joss Whedon, the introduction of Dawn in season 5 was partly so protagonist Buffy Summers could experience a "really important, intense emotional relationship" with someone other than a boyfriend. "She's as intense as she was in season 2 with Angelus, but it's about her sister," Whedon says. "To me that was really beautiful." Trachtenberg says she was thrust into the role without knowing much about Dawn's personality; she describes her initial meeting with Joss Whedon as "Alright, welcome to the cast, you're a teenager, you're a Key, have fun."

== Characterization ==
In the beginning of season 5 Dawn is portrayed as less mature than her age of fourteen. She is seen to be immature, sulky, and klutzy, often breaking objects, and she keeps a diary. Buffy and Joyce also infantilise her to some degree; they are shown finding someone to babysit her, although they later become more relaxed about this as seen in "No Place Like Home".

Responding to fan complaints of Dawn being whiny throughout season 6, Joss Whedon says, "I scratched my head. I was like, 'Excuse me, she's been abandoned by about six parental figures. The girl has huge issues.'" However, he acknowledges that he and the writers hit "the same note for a while... We needed to make some changes." Whedon has expressed regret over not being able to go further with Dawn's character in season 7, but, as he says, "You get into a situation that you do like to stand alone [but] 'Dawn Goes on a Date' is not something that people would really sit for."

Author Nikki Stafford saw the season 7 episode "Potential" as an example of Dawn's growing maturity. She praises the character for taking charge and accepting the possibility she might be a Potential Slayer, and for quietly stepping back when she turns out to be wrong, without revealing how disappointed she really is. Stafford states, "Dawn has come a long way from the annoying adolescent she was in season 5, and the screechy, difficult teen she was in season 6 ('get out, Get Out, GET OUT!'). She is a mature young woman, the same age as Buffy was in season 1, but she is handling her problems with even more grace and acceptance than her older sister did."
