= Clare Kramer =

American actress

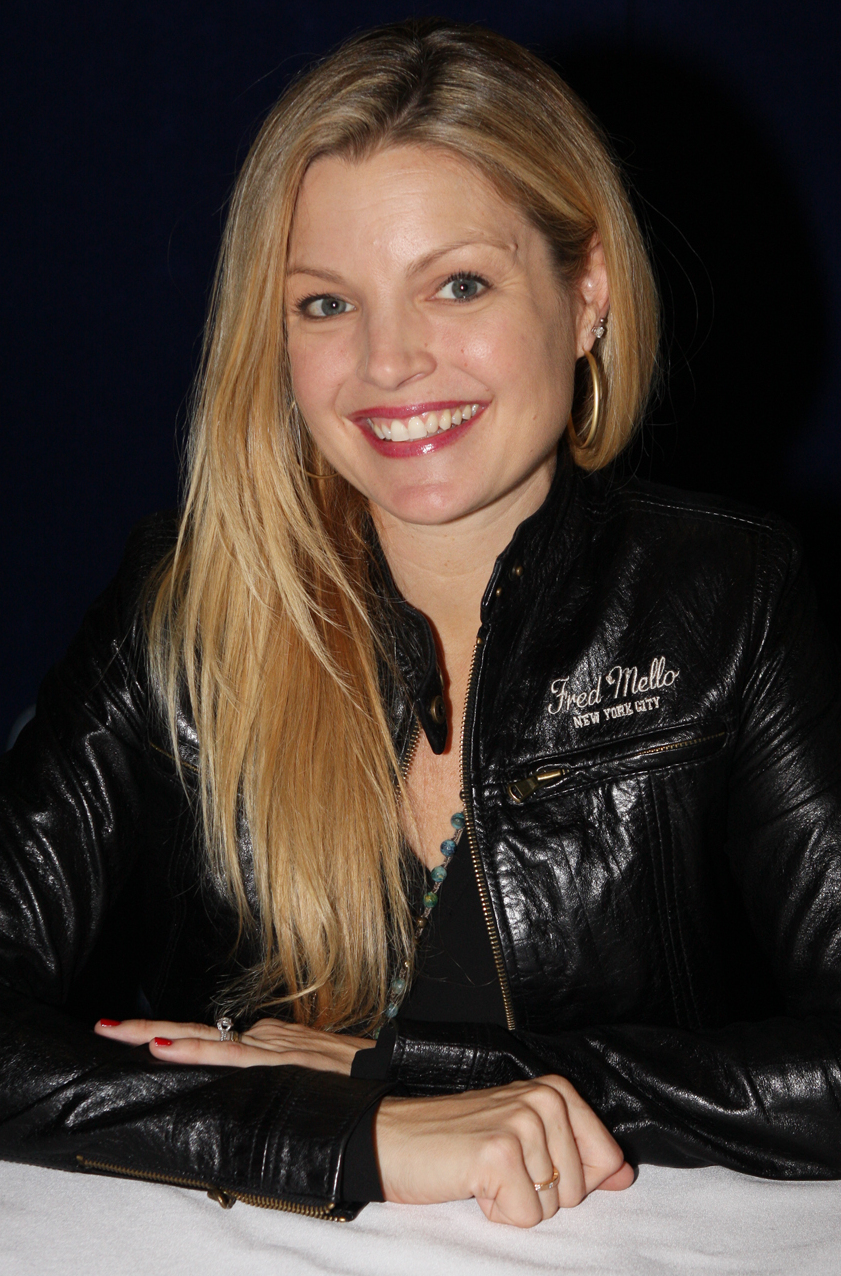
- Kramer in Sydney, 2013
- Born: Atlanta, Georgia, U.S.
- Education: Tisch School of the Arts
- Occupation: Actress
- Years active: 1997–present
- Spouse: Brian Keathley (m. 2005)
- Children: 4

Clare Kramer is an American actress. Her credits include Bring It On (2000), The Rules of Attraction (2002), D.E.B.S. (2003), Tru Calling (2004), The Thirst (2006), House (2006), Road to Hell (2008), and Goodnight Burbank (2011). Among her most notable roles is Glory in Buffy the Vampire Slayer (2000–2002).

She was awarded best actress at the PollyGrind Film Festival 2012 for her portrayal of spree killer Caitlin Shattuck in Road to Hell (2008).

== Personal life ==
Kramer was born in Atlanta, Georgia. She spent most of her childhood in Delaware, Ohio, and is of British and German descent. She has a younger sister named Callie; their parents are Terry and Sandy. After graduating from high school, she attended New York University and received a BFA from NYU's Tisch School of the Arts.

Kramer married producer Brian Keathley on October 29, 2005. They have daughters Gavin and River Marie, and sons Hart and Sky Lynlee.

== Career ==
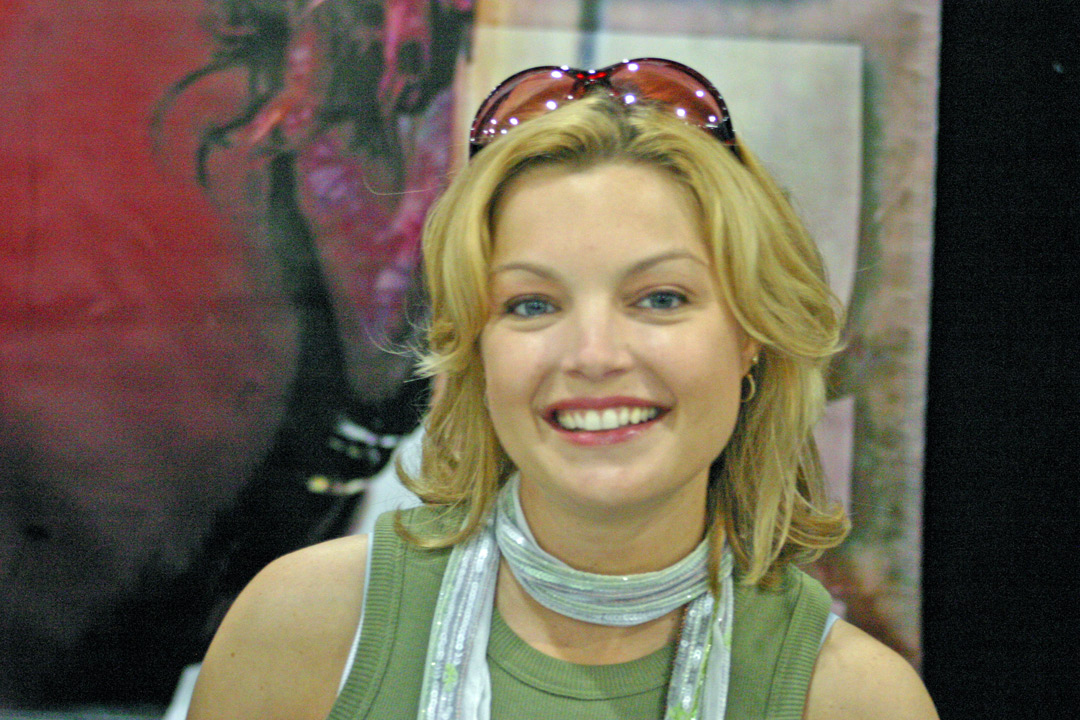
Kramer in 2005

As a child, she was a spokeswoman and mascot for Wendy's, donning the trademark pigtails accentuated in the company logo.

Kramer's film roles include: The Thirst (2006), as a vampire, this time a former drug-addict; The Skulls III (2004), as a competitive swimmer who follows in her brother's footsteps by joining the title organization; Roger Avary's adaptation of the Bret Easton Ellis novel The Rules of Attraction (2002); and Jessica Bendinger's cheerleading comedy Bring It On (2000).

Kramer appeared in Tru Calling (2004), alongside Eliza Dushku, and portrayed fictional movie star and shoplifter Babette Storm in Sabrina, the Teenage Witch (2002). She secured a recurring role as Glory, goddess of a hell dimension, in 13 episodes of Buffy the Vampire Slayer, between 2000 and 2002.

In 2012, Kramer won the PollyGrind Film Festival Best Actress award 2012 for her portrayal of spree killer, Caitlin Shattuck, in the rock fantasy feature, Road to Hell.

She hosts the podcast Take Five with Clare Kramer, and is a co-founder of the online platform Geek Nation.

== Filmography ==
=== Film ===
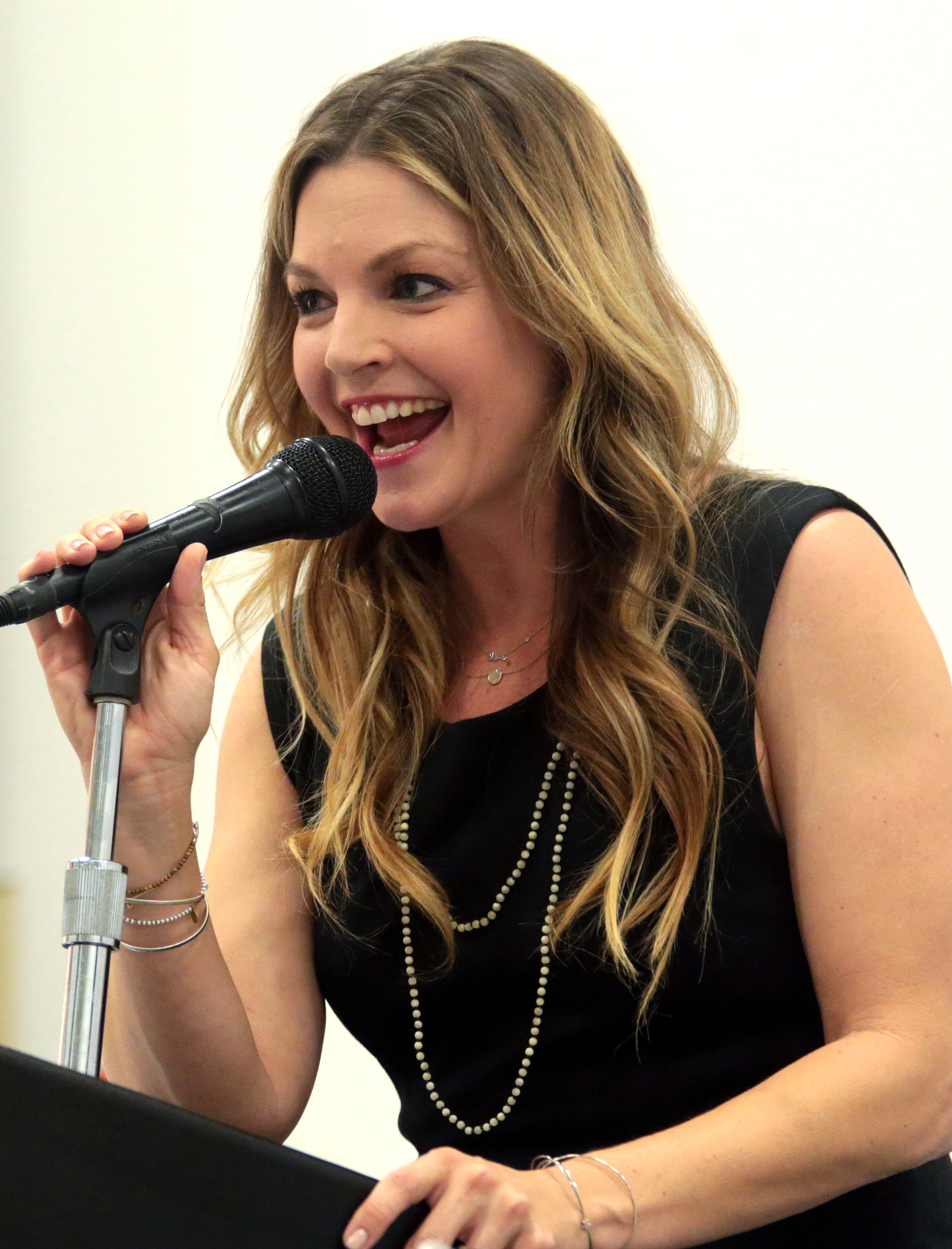
Kramer speaking at WonderCon 2017

Year	Title	Role	Notes
1997	In & Out	Student	
2000	Ropewalk	Liza	
2000	Bring It On	Courtney	
2002	The Mallory Effect	Robin	
2002	The Rules of Attraction	Candice	
2003	D.E.B.S.	Lucy in the Sky / Lucinda Reynolds	Short film
2004	The Scare Hole	Sarah	
2004	The Skulls III	Taylor Brooks	Video
2004	L.A. D.J.	Flyer Girl	
2005	Guy in Row Five	Rose	
2006	The Gravedancers	Allison Mitchell	
2006	The Thirst	Lisa	
2008	The Grift	Grace Armstrong	
2008	Road to Hell	Caitlin	
2010	Endure	Daphne Mayton	
2011	The Dead Ones	Ms. Persephone	
2011	Hard Love	Kelly	
2013	Big Ass Spider!	Lt. Karly Brant	
2015	Tales of Halloween	Lt. Brandt-Mathis	Segment: "Sweet Tooth"
2015	The Lost Tree	Emma	
2017	Zer0-Tolerance	Patrica Spencer	
2018	The Griddle House	Francis	

=== Television ===
Year	Title	Role	Notes
1998	Vig	Heather	TV film
1999	Outreach	Casey Shaw	TV series
1999	Dodge's City	Witch	TV film
2000–2002	Buffy the Vampire Slayer	Glory	Recurring role, 13 episodes
2002	The Random Years	Melissa	"Don't Make Me Have Sex in the Hamptons"
2002	Sabrina, the Teenage Witch	Babette Storm	"Free Sabrina"
2004	Tru Calling	Alex Reynolds	"Drop Dead Gorgeous"
2006	House	Caren Krause	"Meaning"
2011	Goodnight Burbank	Terri Blake	Recurring role
2012–2015	Film Pigs	Herself/Various	Recurring role
2014	Monster School Animation	Clare Kramer	TV series
2016	The Wrong House	Rebecca Lassiter	TV film
2018	Strange Ones	Det. Karen Barnes	TV series, post-production
2018	Dark/Web	Sam	TV series, post-production
2019	Seduced by a Killer	Jessica	TV film

=== Web ===
Year	Title	Role	Notes
2015	Wrestling Isn't Wrestling	D-X Army Member	Short film
2016	Star Trek Continues	Commander Diana Garrett	Web series
