= Phases (Buffy the Vampire Slayer) =

- Buffy the Vampire Slayer episode
- Episode no.: Season 2 Episode 15
- Directed by: Bruce Seth Green
- Written by: Rob Des Hotel; Dean Batali
- Production code: 5V15
- Original air date: January 27, 1998

Guest appearances
- Seth Green as Oz; Camila Griggs as Gym Teacher; Jack Conley as Gib Cain; Larry Bagby as Larry Blaisdell; Megahn Perry as Theresa Klusmeyer; Keith Campbell as Werewolf

Episode chronology
← Previous "Innocence"	Next → "Bewitched, Bothered and Bewildered"
- Buffy the Vampire Slayer season 2

"Phases" is episode 15 of season two of Buffy the Vampire Slayer. It was written by series story editors Rob Des Hotel and Dean Batali, and first broadcast on The WB on January 27, 1998. In the episode, Oz learns that he is a werewolf, while Buffy endures the emotional trauma of dealing with Angelus.

== Plot ==
Cordelia and Xander are attacked by a werewolf that rips a hole in her car's roof. Giles points out that there have been several other attacks, though so far only animals have been killed. During high school gym class, it is revealed that at least two students have been bitten lately: Oz by a cousin, and school macho Larry by a dog.

After some research, Giles tells the Scoobies that a werewolf is a wolf for the three nights of the full moon — the coming night would be the second. Since the werewolf is human the rest of the month, it would be wrong to kill it. This, however, is not the view of misogynist werewolf hunter Gib Cain, who is out for his twelfth pelt and who condescendingly jeers at Buffy for trying to do a man's job.

Buffy and Giles rush to The Bronze, where the werewolf crashes the party. Buffy tries to catch it with a chain but fails. Cain joins them and sneers that it will be Buffy's fault if the werewolf kills anybody. A body does turn up the next morning: Theresa, one of the students. Buffy is not the only one to have feelings of guilt. Oz wakes up in the forest, naked and confused after changing back from his wolf state. Recalling the bite he got, he calls his Aunt Maureen, and bluntly asks if his cousin is a werewolf.

Xander figures that Larry is the most obvious suspect because of the dog bite. When he confronts Larry alone in the gym locker room, he learns that Larry's macho bluster has been a cover-up for the fact that he is secretly gay. Larry leaves with the mistaken impression that Xander is gay, too, but still in the closet. Back in the library, Buffy suggests to Willow that she might have to make the first move if she wants to speed things up with Oz.

Buffy realizes that the reports of Theresa's body did not mention any mauling. She and Xander get to the funeral home in time to watch her rise as a vampire. Theresa passes along greetings from Angelus before Xander stakes her. Buffy is left shaken by this and Xander comforts her. Meanwhile, Angelus and the werewolf confront each other, Angelus in his game face and the werewolf baring its fangs, but Angelus backs away and leaves.

Cain busies himself casting silver bullets for the hunt. Willow visits Oz right before sundown. Oz is about to chain himself up, but lets Willow in the house. Her rant about the mixed signals he is sending is interrupted by him changing into a werewolf. She flees the house screaming, Oz in pursuit. Cain hears the wolf's cry and joins the hunt. The werewolf is distracted by a scent which Cain set as a trap, and Willow escapes and then finds Giles and Buffy, who are about to start the hunt for Oz with a tranquilizer gun. All parties meet in a clearing in the forest, and in the scuffle, it is Willow who shoots Oz, saving everybody. Buffy bends Cain's shotgun with her bare hands using Slayer strength, and tells him to leave Sunnydale.

At school the next morning, Oz and Willow share their first kiss.

== Production ==
=== Writing ===
Buffy writer Rob Des Hotel was quoted in The Monster Book: "'Phases' is probably my favorite episode of the five we [Des Hotel and Dean Batali] wrote. Oz just has an ability to pinpoint what’s going on and make it sound absurd. I think there’s a sweetness to him. In 'Phases,' Willow comes up to him and says 'Hi,' and Oz says, 'That's what I was gonna say.'"

=== Casting ===
After being given the episode's script by Joss Whedon, Seth Green was persuaded to continue working on the show in a larger role. Green said, “It had all this metaphorical stuff and gave strong shades to the character. I said, 'Yeah, I wanna be a part of this!'"

== Themes ==
In the earlier episode "Some Assembly Required," Xander says, "People don’t fall in love with what’s right in front on them. People want the dream. What they can't have. The more unattainable, the more attractive." In "Phases," Willow complains to Cordelia about Xander: "He's so busy looking around at everything he doesn't have, he doesn't even realize what he does have."

In an essay exploring the feminist ethics of Buffy, Shannon Craigo-Snell uses this episode as an example of how the series examines the threat of sexual violence facing women and girls as a "problematic background against which women attempt to have satisfying relationships with men." Craigo-Snell points out that this threat is embodied by the character of Larry, who sexually harasses Buffy (and other girls) during a gym class focused on self-defense, and the werewolf-hunter Cain, who says Buffy's failure to capture the werewolf is "what happens when a woman tries to do a man's job." The theme is made explicit when Giles describes werewolves as "potent, extreme representation of our inborn, animalistic traits," predatory and aggressive with no conscience, and Buffy responds, "In other words, your typical male."

Reviewer Billie Doux, giving a rating of three and a half stakes out of four, observes that "there was a lot of opposite-sex bashing in this episode. We have Cordelia and Willow at the Bronze commiserating about guy-related idiocy ("they grow body hair and they lose all ability to say what they really want"); and we have "mein furrier" insulting women right and left and saying how Buffy can't catch a werewolf because she's a girl. And we have gender-role bashing, too: gay Larry pretending to be a wolf (the other kind of wolf) and functioning as a perfect werewolf decoy, and Buffy throwing him in gym class, even though she's supposed to be pretending that she's a girly-girl."

Roger Pocock writes, "Werewolves might be used here as a metaphor for toxic male-dominated relationships, but if that's the case Oz breaks that mould. By the end of the episode we instead have something akin to an allegory for mental health issues within a relationship, with Willow undeterred by her boyfriend's split personality, and they can finally share their first kiss in the knowledge of who they are, without that kiss being stolen under false pretences. It's the reverse of the Angel/Buffy relationship." Mike Loschiavo notes that "the fact that Oz is neither defeated nor cured is also a nice twist."

Myles McNutt, reviewing the post-"Innocence" episodes, observes that "the changes are for the most part subtle rather than substantial. ... While you could argue there is now more darkness in Buffy's world, that doesn't really change the tone of the series, nor does it dramatically alter the kinds of stories the show decides to tell. Rather, the changes during this period come in the form of the supernatural becoming personal, with supernatural phenomenon presenting itself (primarily) in ways that tap into something inherent to these characters rather than inherent to the Hellmouth or some sort of demonic power."

== Continuity ==
In the opening scene, Oz remarks on the moving eyes of the cheerleader trophy, a reference to schoolmate Amy Madison's evil mother, who was a former cheerleader and whose soul was trapped in the statuette in episode 3 of season 1, "Witch".

Xander says to Oz, "I know what it's like to crave the taste of freshly killed meat, to be taken over by these uncontrollable urges..." Thus, he inadvertently admits that he remembers being possessed by a hyena spirit in episode 6 of season 1, "The Pack". Buffy calls him on it, and he admits, "I said I didn't remember anything about that," but Buffy fails to pursue it.

Oz becomes a werewolf, a defining characteristic of his character for the remainder of the series.

== Reception ==
Vox ranked it at #87 of all 144 episodes on their "Every Episode Ranked From Worst to Best" list (to mark the 20th anniversary of the show), writing, "After the horror and pain of “Surprise”/“Innocence,” “Phases” is a lighter, sweeter variation on the “my boyfriend’s a hellbeast, what do I do” story. It helps that it’s a showcase for Oz, the chillest werewolf ever to were."

Noel Murray of The A.V. Club writes that Oz's werewolf revelation "mirrors what's going on in Season Two's master-plot, and serves as a metaphor for the wild beast lurking within even the sweetest of young men. Angel's turn to the dark side is only an episode old, and it's already having repercussions; the women of Sunnydale are learning that boys are no damn good."

Reviewer Justin Carreiro remarks that "the scene of Cordelia and Xander making out in the parked car reminded me so much of retro urban legends and horror movies" and it "suited the horror side of the series." Meanwhile, he says, "Oz turning into the werewolf felt very Teen Wolf ... a painful transformation ... heavily mixed with teen couple drama."

== Notes ==
1. Christopher Golden, Stephen R. Bissette, and Thomas E. Sniegoski. The Monster Book. Simon & Schuster, 2000.
