= Satsu (Buffy the Vampire Slayer) =

Comic book character

- Satsu as seen on the cover of "Swell" (February 2009). Art by Jo Chen.

Publication information
- Publisher: Dark Horse Comics
- First appearance: Buffy the Vampire Slayer Season Eight #1 (March 2007)
- Created by: Joss Whedon (writer); Georges Jeanty (artist)
- Voiced by: Michanne Quinney (Note: Michanne Quinney voices the character for the motion comic adaptation of Buffy the Vampire Slayer Season Eight.)

In-story information
- Team affiliations: Slayers; United States Army
- Partnerships: Buffy Summers; Willow Rosenberg; Kennedy
- Abilities: Supernatural strength, speed, stamina, and agility; Accelerated healing; Prophetic dreams

Satsu is a fictional character in the Buffy the Vampire Slayer comics published by Dark Horse Comics. She first appears in Buffy the Vampire Slayer Season Eight #1 (2007), a canonical continuation of the television series of the same name. The television series follows Buffy Summers, a Slayer destined to fight supernatural foes, and ends with her sharing this power with others. After being activated as a Slayer, Satsu is trained by Buffy, becoming her strongest fighter, and falls in love with her. They have sex twice before Satsu becomes the leader of a squad of Slayers in Tokyo. In her later storylines, Satsu struggles to move on from Buffy, fights demonically-possessed stuffed animals, and briefly reappears in Buffy the Vampire Slayer Season Ten.

Satsu was developed by Buffy's creator Joss Whedon and artist Georges Jeanty; Jeanty was the primary artist for Satsu and took inspiration for her appearance from Japanese street fashion. Whedon considered Satsu's sexual relationship with Buffy a natural progression of their storylines and a way to further explore both characters. In response to criticism, editor Scott Allie and writer Drew Goddard denied that it was a publicity stunt or a political statement. Acknowledging past criticism of his treatment of LGBT characters, Whedon confirmed that Satsu would continue to appear after the end of her relationship with Buffy.

Satsu's relationship with Buffy received mixed reactions from fans, some of which Dark Horse Comics published in the letter columns of several issues. Reviewers discussed Season Eight's treatment of its lesbian characters, with some praising Satsu's storyline. Critics, fans, and industry insiders had a more mixed response to Satsu's sexual relationship with Buffy; some reviewers found it a positive representation of sexuality, while others deemed it gratuitous. Several scholarly articles focused on this aspect of the character. Academics have analyzed the unequal power dynamic between Satsu and Buffy and have compared the representations of their sexuality. To a lesser extent, scholars have also discussed the depiction of Satsu's race and ethnicity.

== Storylines ==
Buffy the Vampire Slayer is a television series about Buffy Summers, who attempts to balance her responsibilities as the Slayer—a young woman destined to fight the "forces of darkness"—with the rest of her life. A Slayer possesses supernatural strength, speed, stamina, and agility, as well as accelerated healing and prophetic dreams, and usually only one is active at a time. Buffy changes this in the series finale by having her best friend, the witch Willow Rosenberg, make every woman who could potentially be a Slayer into one. As revealed in the comics, Satsu was one of the potential Slayers activated. (Note: Introduced in the story arc, "The Long Way Home", Satsu is only referenced by her first name. In a Dark Horse Comics article, comics editor Scott Allie said that the character did not have a last name as "we do not know yet".)

Satsu was raised by a traditional Japanese family, who disapproved of her being a lesbian. After joining a squad of Slayers based in Scotland, she is mentored by Buffy, becoming her most skilled fighter. In battle, Satsu uses martial arts and a katana. According to scholar Lisa Gomez, she is characterized as "strong, accountable, and well put-together". Buffy views Satsu as her potential successor, saying that she is capable of leading the squad. When the witch Amy Madison places Buffy in a deep sleep, Satsu breaks the curse by giving her true love's kiss. She participates in missions, including rescuing Willow, who Amy had kidnapped, and battling a demon and his army. Buffy later reveals that she knew Satsu had kissed her, recognizing the taste of her cinnamon lip gloss. She warns Satsu against pursuing a relationship with her, saying that her previous partners ended up either dying or leaving.

The two later have sex and are discovered in bed together by Buffy's friends. The same night, the Japanese vampire Toru steals Buffy's scythe as part of a plan to disempower all the Slayers. Buffy recruits the entire Scotland squad, including Satsu, to recover the scythe from Tokyo. Satsu disagrees with these plans, but Buffy instructs her to follow orders. Willow comforts Satsu, reminding her that since Buffy is heterosexual and the general, a romantic relationship is unlikely. After Toru's scheme is stopped, Satsu decides to distance herself from Buffy by remaining in Japan to lead its squad of Slayers. Before separating, the two have sex one last time. Throughout this storyline, Satsu is shown as rebellious when she questions Buffy's commands and as emotionally vulnerable when she is saddened by the relationship ending.

Satsu receives a performance review from fellow Slayer Kennedy, who volunteered for the role to encourage Satsu to move on from Buffy and find someone new. She resists this advice, describing her relationship with Buffy as true love. They discover a stuffed animal known as Vampy Cat, which possesses Satsu and makes her wear a furisode and behave in a misogynistic and homophobic manner. After Kennedy saves her, they find out that demons known as the Swell are controlling the Vampy Cats. Satsu destroys a shipment of them with a Korean submarine that she had previously hijacked from vampires. In a video call, Buffy advises Satsu that since the vampire Harmony Kendall is leading an anti-Slayer campaign, they should be more low-profile and more human. Satsu agrees, and decides to throw out her cinnamon lip gloss in favor of finding a "new flavor".

Satsu, along with the rest of the Slayers, retreats to Tibet after the masked villain Twilight tracks their use of magic to lead direct attacks against them. Although the Slayers disable their powers to avoid detection, Twilight finds them and confronts them with his army. Following the battle, Buffy is separated from the Slayers and discovers Twilight is her ex-boyfriend, the vampire Angel. Satsu uses a tablet computer to locate Buffy and is upset when she finds her having sex with Angel. As a result of their union, Buffy and Angel create a sentient dimension. Rejecting it, Buffy destroys the Seed of Wonder—the source of all magic on Earth—to prevent an apocalypse; following these events, the Slayers disband. Satsu goes on to work for the United States Army and begins a new relationship. She later convinces Buffy to work with vampires to stop an ongoing series of demonic invasions from other dimensions.

== Development ==
=== Creation and design ===
Sketch of Satsu from Buffy the Vampire Slayer Season 8 Library Edition (2012); art by Georges Jeanty

After Buffy the Vampire Slayer ended with its seventh season, creator Joss Whedon developed a canonical continuation of the television series with Buffy the Vampire Slayer Season Eight, a comic book series published by Dark Horse Comics. (Note: Joss Whedon defined canon as a "demarcation between the creation and ancillary creations by different people". Most of the prior Buffy the Vampire Slayer comics were not considered canon, except for Fray and The Origin. While promoting Season Eight, Whedon discussed how they "could do something and for once make it canon".) Satsu is introduced in the first story arc, "The Long Way Home" (2007), which was written by Whedon and penciled by Georges Jeanty. In his notes for that story arc, Jeanty referred to Satsu as one of the "main Slayers" in the comics.

Whedon wanted each of the new Slayers to have a unique and identifiable appearance. He encouraged Jeanty to use Fruits—a Japanese street fashion magazine—as inspiration for Satsu's character design, envisioning her as "one of those eccentric anime-looking girls" who are often photographed for the publication. Jeanty spent hours researching different outfits for Satsu to wear, describing her as the "genki girl who always changed her look".

Jeanty was the primary artist for Satsu, describing the character as "all mine", and said that she was challenging to draw as her style varied so often. He provided references for comic book artist Jo Chen, who included Satsu on her cover for issue #22, "Swell" (2009). According to Whedon, Buffy was attracted to Satsu's style, which inspired Jeanty to draw her with Satsu's hairstyle in Buffy the Vampire Slayer Season Nine #1 (2011). Buffy had complimented Satsu's hair in "The Long Way Home", saying that she wanted to get tips on it. For Satsu's later appearance in Buffy the Vampire Slayer Season Ten #21 (2015), she was drawn by comic book artist Rebekah Isaacs.

=== Relationship with Buffy ===
Whedon considered Satsu's sexual relationship with Buffy in the "Wolves at the Gate" story arc (2008) a natural progression of their storyline because Season Eight had already established Buffy as lonely and Satsu as in love with her. Wanting to avoid a will-they-won't-they dynamic, he chose to play up "the romance, the sexiness, a little pain, and as much French farce as [he and writer Drew Goddard] possibly could". Goddard, who also wrote for Buffy the Vampire Slayer, believed that the transition from television to comics allowed for greater creative freedom. He did not view the storyline as a "grand political statement", instead seeing it as grounded in the characters and their development.

Comics editor Scott Allie believed the decision to have Buffy experiment sexually with a woman came from how Whedon "sees the world", explaining that "the way Joss experiences the world, this happens with people." Allie viewed Buffy's relationship with Satsu as an example of how Whedon often incorporates "ill-conceived romance" and LGBTQ representation in his stories. He acknowledged that Buffy had previously used people to cope with loneliness, like Spike in the show's sixth season, and considered her relationship with Satsu as inappropriate given their roles as general and soldier. Although Jeanty was uncertain about Buffy having sex with a woman, he felt that Whedon best understood her as a character. Sarah Michelle Gellar, who portrays Buffy in the television series, approved of the relationship, commenting: "Buffy's getting some action! Good for her!"

Whedon said that after "Wolves at the Gate", Satsu would appear again. While jokingly suggesting that Satsu may be killed, he acknowledged past criticism that he contributed to the "bury your gays" trope with the death of lesbian character Tara Maclay. He explained: "You do have to be careful about the message you're sending out. It's a double-edged sword. You have to be responsible, but you also have to be irresponsible or you're not telling the best stories."

== Themes and analysis ==
=== Power dynamic and sexuality ===
Scholarly articles about Satsu primarily focused on her relationship with Buffy. Academics had varying interpretations of the power dynamic between the two characters, with author Tamy Burnett specifying—in an analysis of "Wolves at the Gate"—that Buffy has "to some degree, taken advantage of Satsu's feelings for her to explore her own sexuality". Sociologist Hélène Frohard-Dourlent believed Satsu has less authority than Buffy. Frohard-Dourlent interpreted this power imbalance as represented through Buffy being the heterosexual, emotionally-uninvolved partner, a military leader, and the one establishing the terms of the relationship rather than Satsu.

According to Frohard-Dourlent and academic Lewis Call, Satsu does express some agency, sometimes more so than Buffy. Frohard-Dourlent noted that Satsu is asked by Buffy to assess her sexual performance and is the one who initiates their second encounter. Call wrote that when Buffy has sex with Satsu again, she uncharacteristically takes on a more submissive role. Despite these moments, Frohard-Dourlent argued that the comics do not fully address the power imbalance between the two characters, since the heterosexual Buffy has more dominance while Satsu is placed in a "more vulnerable position in every respect".

Burnett and author Alex Liddell compared and contrasted how the comics portray Satsu's sexuality with Buffy's. Liddell described Satsu as having a "fixed lesbianism", which is in contrast with Buffy's more "ambiguous sexual attraction" that is shown only with a single character. Burnett argued that Satsu repeats similar behavioral patterns as Buffy did in the television series, writing that both tried to deepen a sexual relationship despite their partner being uninterested in doing so. (Note: Burnett makes this comparison as part of an analysis of Buffy's sexual partners in the television series: vampires Angel and Spike, one-night stand Parker Abrams, and commander Riley Finn.)

=== Race and ethnicity ===
Satsu's sexuality received more scholarly attention than her race and ethnicity. Academic Jessica Hautsch reported that a majority of discussions on Satsu's relationship with Buffy are about heteronormativity and the depiction of gender and sexuality rather than examining its "interracial and international dynamic". According to Frohard-Dourlent, readers did not talk about Satsu being Japanese, noting that her ethnicity was not brought up in connection with Buffy being White or their sexual relationship. Frohard-Dourlent reasoned that readers "saw no reason to" address this point, and she did not think this stemmed from a discomfort with discussing race and ethnicity.

Political scholar Carolyn Cocca cited Satsu as an example of the comics including a diverse range of races and ethnicities with the Slayers, but clarified that several of them are background characters. Cocca wrote that by Buffy the Vampire Slayer Season Ten, most of this representation was removed to focus on the main characters from the television series.

Hautsch argued that the comics portray Satsu as Japanese only through her appearance and use of a katana, downplaying her heritage with her use of slang and American English. She wrote that while "Wolves at the Gate" avoids presenting Satsu through the common East Asian stereotypes of the geisha or the Dragon Lady, "Swell" does so through the art and the dialogue. In Hautsch's view, Satsu's negative response to wearing a furisode and her preference for "more Westernized demon hunting garb" signal that the character identifies more with Western culture rather than her own heritage. She noted that the comics present Satsu's ethnicity as incompatible with her "subjectivity as a woman, a lesbian, and a Slayer".

== Reception ==
While "Wolves at the Gate" was being published, critics, fans, and industry insiders criticized Buffy's sexual relationship with Satsu as a publicity stunt, which Scott Allie denied. Fan response was mixed; while some felt the relationship had developed organically and positively portrayed different sexualities, others believed that Buffy was acting out of character. Dark Horse Comics included positive and negative feedback from fans as part of the letter columns for Season Eight #24–29 (2009); in issue #24, 47 responses were printed. (Note: Companies typically printed four or five letters in a comic book letter column.) Allie viewed the range of these reactions as a "microcosm of the [United States]", but clarified that since Whedon's fan base was more left-leaning, the responses would be more skewed in that direction.

Satsu's relationship with Buffy was praised as one of Season Eight's highlights by Curve's Lisa Gunther and Jef Rouner of the Houston Press. In Nerdist, Jessica Marie MacFarlane wrote that although the characters are only briefly together, they had "genuine emotion tacked onto mutual slayer attraction". Reviewers expressed more varied reactions to Buffy having sex with Satsu, describing it as a positive representation of sexuality or as gratuitous. Lewis Call wrote that through this pairing, the comics present a "positive image of a caring, consensual bisexual relationship". Emily Friedman from ABC News was more critical, likening a panel of Buffy and Satsu in bed together to softcore pornography. The Mary Sue's Teresa Jusino thought these moments were done for "momentary shock value and reader titillation".

Season Eight's treatment of its lesbian characters, including Satsu, was a topic of critical commentary. Call criticized the comics for relying on "clichéd terms" to depict lesbians, and questioned how Satsu and Kennedy could be the only lesbian Slayers in an army of thousands. Lisa Gomez argued that Satsu is "degraded into being nothing but a lesbian Slayer who sleeps with Buffy", emphasizing how their sexual relationship remains the focus in "Swell" despite being set several issues after "Wolves at the Gate". Jessica Hautsch wrote that although the comics characterize Satsu as a "nuanced character and complex queer woman", she is not represented as a "complex queer Asian Slayer". In a more positive review, Sarah Warn from AfterEllen praised "Swell" for its focus on lesbians of color, with Satsu and Kennedy, and enjoyed their connection and character development.
