= Buffy the Vampire Slayer: Radio Sunnydale – Music from the TV Series =

Buffy the Vampire Slayer: Radio Sunnydale - Music from the TV Series
- US cover

Soundtrack album by Various Artists
- Released: September 30, 2003
- Genre: Television Soundtrack
- Length: 40:17 (US); 74:11 (UK)
- Label: Virgin Records
- Producer: John C. King

Alternative cover
- UK cover

Buffy the Vampire Slayer: Radio Sunnydale – Music from the TV Series is the second Buffy the Vampire Slayer soundtrack album after Buffy the Vampire Slayer: The Album.

Radio Sunnydale concentrates on Buffy's fifth to seventh seasons, though a few tracks from earlier seasons, such as Christophe Beck's score from "The Zeppo" on the UK version, are also included. It was released to coincide with the end of the show, in autumn 2003.

Two different versions of the album were produced, one for the US and one for the UK. The US version featured only twelve tracks, while the UK version removed the tracks by Joey Ramone, Sarah McLachlan and Blur but added twelve more, making a total of 21 tracks. Both versions of the album use different cover art. The Australia and Latin America releases are identical to the UK version. The soundtrack is now out of print in both the US and the UK.

== Track listing (US version) ==
1. The Breeders – "Buffy Main Title Theme"
2. Joey Ramone – "Stop Thinking About It" (from "Beneath You")
3. The Dandy Warhols – "Bohemian Like You" (from "Triangle")
4. Nikka Costa – "Everybody Got Their Something" (from "All the Way")
5. dēvics – "Key" (from "Crush")
6. Lunatic Calm – "Sound of the Revolution" (from "As You Were")
7. Dashboard Prophets – "Ballad for Dead Friends" (from "The Harvest")
8. Angie Hart – "Blue" (from "Conversations with Dead People")
9. Aimee Mann – "Pavlov's Bell" (from "Sleeper")
10. Blur – "There's No Other Way" (from "Triangle")
11. Sarah McLachlan – "Prayer of Saint Francis" (from "Grave")
12. Robert Duncan – "The Final Fight" (original score) (from "Chosen")

== Track listing (UK and Latin American version) ==
1. The Breeders – "Buffy Main Title Theme"
2. The Dandy Warhols – "Bohemian Like You" (from "Triangle")
3. Nikka Costa – "Everybody Got Their Something" (from "All the Way")
4. Christophe Beck – "Dead Guys with Bombs" (from "The Zeppo")
5. dēvics – "Key" (from "Crush")
6. Lunatic Calm – "Sound of the Revolution" (from "As You Were")
7. Dashboard Prophets – "Ballad for Dead Friends" (from "The Harvest")
8. Angie Hart – "Blue" (from "Conversations with Dead People")
9. Aimee Mann – "Pavlov's Bell" (from "Sleeper")
10. Alison Krauss – "That Kind of Love" (from "Entropy")
11. Aberdeen – "Sink or Float" (from "The Killer in Me")
12. Patty Medina – "Still Life" (from "First Date")
13. Laika – "Black Cat Bone" (from "Wrecked")
14. Man of the Year – "Just as Nice" (from "All the Way")
15. Melanie Doane – "I Can't Take My Eyes off You" (from "Family")
16. Fonda – "The Sun Keeps Shining on Me" (from "All the Way")
17. Halo Friendlies – "Run Away" (from "Smashed")
18. Emiliana Torrini – "Summerbreeze" (from "Into the Woods")
19. Cibo Matto – "Sugar Water" (from "When She Was Bad")
20. Robert Duncan – "The Final Fight" (Original Score) (from "Chosen")
21. Nerf Herder – "Buffy the Vampire Slayer Theme" (from seasons 1 and 2)
