= Wrecked (Buffy the Vampire Slayer) =

- Buffy the Vampire Slayer episode
- Episode no.: Season 6 Episode 10
- Directed by: David Solomon
- Written by: Marti Noxon
- Production code: 6ABB10
- Original air date: November 27, 2001

Guest appearances
- Elizabeth Anne Allen as Amy Madison; Jeff Kober as Rack; Amber Benson as Tara Maclay; Fleming Brooks as Mandraz; Mageina Tovah as Jonesing Girl; Michael Giordani as Jonesing Guy; Colin Malone as Creepy Guy

Episode chronology
← Previous "Smashed"	Next → "Gone"
- Buffy the Vampire Slayer season 6

"Wrecked" is the 10th episode of season 6 of the television series Buffy the Vampire Slayer. The episode aired on November 27, 2001, on UPN.

== Plot ==
Tara and Dawn wake on the couch and find that neither Buffy nor Willow returned home the night before. Buffy wakes up naked with Spike to find that the building around them fell down as she remembers what they did. Spike tempts Buffy as she tries to leave and reminds her of everything they did the night before. Disgusted by their actions, Buffy leaves, threatening to kill Spike if he tells anyone about what happened.

Amy returns home with Willow and rambles about Willow's amazing magic—in front of Tara and Dawn. Tara leaves as Buffy returns, and after a chat, Amy leaves and Buffy and Willow go to bed after their long nights. Willow tries to shut the drapes of her room with magic, but she is too exhausted to manage it. Anya reads bridal magazines instead of researching the freezing demon. Xander gets frustrated, finding bridal magazines in every research book he checks. At the magic shop, Xander, Anya and Buffy discuss Willow's behavior and Buffy comes to Willow's defense.

Amy suggests that she and Willow visit a warlock, Rack, who can give them great spells that last without any recovery time. The house is cloaked and filled with the magically addicted, seeking a fix. Rack takes a "tour" of Willow's mind before giving her what she came for. Amy spins about the room wildly as Willow hangs out on the ceiling, seeing spots and weird images. The next morning, Willow wakes in her own room and cries in the shower. She manipulates some of Tara's clothes to form an invisible body and curls up against it.

When Buffy returns home to find Amy stealing some of Willow's magical supplies, she scolds her as Amy behaves obsessively about the supplies and tells Buffy about Willow's whereabouts. Willow and Dawn talk about food and Tara, then take a detour to Rack's place so Willow can get a fix. Dawn waits impatiently in the waiting room with a freaky man. Meanwhile, Willow floats in Rack's room and sees herself flying in space before a demon holding a limp body makes her scream.

Buffy wakes Spike and demands his help in finding Willow and Dawn. Dawn is mad that Willow left her for so long, and Willow's carefree attitude makes Dawn nervous and eager to return home. Buffy refuses to admit she likes Spike and he again reminds her how much she really wants and needs him. A demon confronts Willow, claiming that she summoned him with her magic. The demon cuts Dawn and the girls run. Willow uses magic to take over and drive a car, but it crashes and both she and Dawn are wounded, with Dawn breaking her arm. The demon catches up with their wrecked car and Dawn tries desperately to fight it off. Spike and Buffy, who heard Dawn scream, come to the rescue. Buffy fights the demon while Spike takes care of Dawn, who is wounded. Suddenly the demon explodes into flames as a result of a killing spell cast by Willow. Despite Willow's sincere apology and tearful regret, Buffy tells her to stay back and Dawn slaps her away in anger.

Spike takes Dawn to the hospital and Buffy confronts a devastated and remorseful Willow who is now finally able to ask for help. At the house, Buffy talks with Willow about her abuse of magic and the consequences. With Buffy's support, Willow decides to give up magic for good. Buffy also senses the similarities between Willow's magic use and her own situation with Spike. Later, Willow fights the symptoms of withdrawal in her bed while Buffy hugs a cross and surrounds her bedroom with garlic.

== Reception ==
In 2023, Rolling Stone, ranked this episode as #126 out of the 144 episodes in honor of 20th anniversary of the show ending.
