= Witch (Buffy the Vampire Slayer) =

- Buffy the Vampire Slayer episode
- Episode no.: Season 1 Episode 3
- Directed by: Stephen Cragg
- Written by: Dana Reston
- Production code: 4V03
- Original air date: 17 March 1997

Guest appearances
- Kristine Sutherland as Joyce Summers; Elizabeth Anne Allen as Amy Madison; Robin Riker as Catherine Madison; Jim Doughan as Mr. Pole; Nicole Prescott as Lishanne; Amanda Wilmshurst as Joy; William Monaghan as Dr. Gregory

Episode chronology
← Previous "The Harvest"	Next → "Teacher's Pet"
- Buffy the Vampire Slayer season 1

"Witch" is the third episode of the first season of the television series Buffy the Vampire Slayer. It serves as the show's first regular episode after the pilot and originally aired in the United States on 17 March 1997, on The WB. Sometimes billed as "The Witch", the episode was directed by Stephen Cragg and was the first episode not written by show creator Joss Whedon.

When students start dropping out of cheerleading tryouts by spontaneously combusting, going blind and losing the power of speech, Buffy and her posse suspect a powerful witch is in their midst. Buffy herself soon becomes the target of a deadly spell as they discover the witch's true identity. Meanwhile, Xander finally musters up the nerve to ask Buffy out on a date but in the throes of a witch's spell, Buffy's response isn't exactly as he'd hoped.

== Plot ==
Despite Giles' (Anthony Stewart Head) misgivings, Buffy (Sarah Michelle Gellar) decides to try out for the cheerleading squad in order to reclaim some of the happy, normal social life she enjoyed back in Los Angeles. Right before the tryouts begin, Xander gives Buffy a bracelet with "Yours Always" engraved on it. During her routine, the hands of a girl named Amber spontaneously combust. In the library, the gang discusses what happened, and Xander (Nicholas Brendon) and Willow (Alyson Hannigan) offer to help Buffy research Amber's past.

Cheerleading tryouts continue the next day, during which Amy (Elizabeth Anne Allen) falls into Cordelia (Charisma Carpenter), knocking her over. Amy is under intense pressure to compete from her domineering mother Catherine (Robin Riker), a star cheerleader in her day once nicknamed "Catherine the Great." Willow tells Buffy about Amy and their friendship during junior high, revealing that Catherine was emotionally abusive toward Amy. She then tells Buffy that her research on Amber has revealed the girl to be an average student with a normal record. In the locker room, Cordelia threatens Amy, declaring that she will "be sorry" if her clumsiness prevents Cordelia from making the squad.

Xander eagerly asks Willow if Buffy is wearing the bracelet he gave her before tryouts. Buffy finds out she is on the substitution list as the first alternate when the cheerleading tryout results are posted. Amy is devastated when she only makes it as the third alternate. Buffy tries to be sympathetic to Amy, who continues to compare herself to her mother. Meanwhile, an unknown woman is seen performing a magic ceremony over a cauldron with Barbie dolls dressed as cheerleaders, naming Cordelia as its victim.

The next morning before school, Buffy eats breakfast while her mom tries to tell her about her own high school experiences while on the yearbook staff. Buffy shuts her down, and an argument ensues about Buffy living her own life. At school, Xander continues to talk to Willow about his crush on Buffy and finally decides to ask her out. To his dismay, Buffy is distracted by a spellbound Cordelia. Under the spell, Cordelia is struck blind during her driver's education class, and Buffy saves her from being hit by a van after she wanders into traffic.

According to Giles, blinding enemies is a favorite spell among witches. Believing Amy to be a witch, Buffy collects some of Amy's hair during science class, and they perform a test that proves Amy cast the spells. Amy goes home and orders her mother to do her homework, while she goes upstairs with a bracelet that she stole from Buffy during class.

The next morning, an unusually manic Buffy loses her position on the cheerleading squad to Amy after throwing the squad captain across the gym. Giles discovers that a vengeance spell has destroyed Buffy's immune system, giving her around three hours to live. The only way to cure her and break the other spells is to get the witch's spell book and reverse the magic. The ailing Buffy and Giles confront Catherine and discover that she has switched bodies with her daughter, claiming Amy was wasting her youth and took it for herself. Giles finds the witch's book and takes Amy and Buffy back to the school to break the spells.

Catherine is cheering at the Sunnydale High basketball game when she starts getting visions of what Giles is attempting to do. Xander and Willow are unable to stop her from storming into the science lab with an axe, but they give Giles enough time to break the spells. Amy and her mother switch back into their own bodies, and Buffy regains the strength to fight. Catherine begins to cast a powerful curse, but Buffy kicks down a mirror that reflects her attack, causing Catherine to vanish.

After her mother's disappearance, Amy's father is delighted to have her live with him. She tells Buffy that she is happy to finally have a normal parent-child relationship. The two girls pass by a trophy case where the cheerleading trophy of "Catherine the Great" stands. While both girls wonder where Amy's mother is, the camera pulls close to the statue's face, revealing Catherine's terrified eyes and a muffled voice pleading for help.

== Cultural references ==
When Buffy discovers that Amy is a witch, she says, "She's our Sabrina," referring to Sabrina, the Teenage Witch.

Xander references the Human Torch when speculating on Amber's combustion.

Buffy and Joyce reference actress Farrah Fawcett and Sally Field's portrayal of Gidget while discussing hairstyles.

While talking about Amy's mother, Buffy references the book and later movie Mommie Dearest by Joan Crawford's daughter Christina, which claimed Joan was abusive.

== Broadcast and reception ==
"Witch" was first broadcast on The WB on 17 March 1997. It pulled in an audience of 3.2 million households.

Vox ranked it at #77 on their "Every Episode Ranked From Worst to Best" list (to mark the 20th anniversary of the show), writing that it "is the first genuine monster-of-the-week episode, and a bit of a proof of concept. It’s the episode that demonstrates Buffy's high school-era mission: to take the demons of adolescence – in this case, an abusive mother trying to live vicariously through her daughter – and literalize them into demons that can be killed. And while this episode doesn’t accomplish that mission with the nuance the show will later develop, it’s at least doing so with heart and charm."

Noel Murray of The A.V. Club gave the episode a grade of B, describing it as "an entertaining hour with a semi-clever twist". He liked the attention given to Joyce's role as Buffy's mother, but felt that more could have been done with the cheerleading storyline. A review from the BBC called it "predictable" and stated that the "script doesn't sparkle like Whedon's previous two episodes, and often lacks subtlety". However, the review praised the curses and Buffy under the spell. DVD Talk's Phillip Duncan described "Witch" as "[an] interesting look [at] peer pressure" and wrote, "Whedon and his crew easily take what could have been a simple monster-of-the-week plot and ground it firmly in the here and now."

Rolling Stone ranked "The Witch" at #84 on their "Every Episode Ranked From Worst to Best" list, calling it "a cracker." Though it is "a surprisingly dark story, focused on power dynamics and abusive parenting," season one is "a pretty whacky affair overall," and this episode "stands out as being just that shade bleaker."

"The Witch" was ranked at #48 on Paste Magazine's "Every Episode Ranked" list and #25 on BuzzFeed's "Ranking Every Episode" list.
