= Timemaster (film) =

- VHS Artwork
- Directed by: James Glickenhaus
- Written by: James Glickenhaus
- Produced by: Jefferson Richard
- Starring: Jesse Cameron-Glickenhaus; Pat Morita; Joanna Pacula; Duncan Regehr; Michael Dorn; Michelle Williams
- Cinematography: Stephen M. Katz
- Edited by: David Kern
- Music by: Harry Manfredini
- Production companies: Digital Magic; Shapiro-Glickenhaus Entertainment
- Distributed by: MCA/Universal Home Video
- Release dates: July 21, 1995 (Spain); December 27, 1995 (US)
- Running time: 100 minutes
- Country: United States
- Language: English

Timemaster is a 1995 American science-fiction adventure film written and directed by James Glickenhaus and starring Jesse Cameron-Glickenhaus, Pat Morita, Joanna Pacula, Duncan Regehr, Michael Dorn and Michelle Williams in one of her first film roles.

This was the last film released by Shapiro-Glickenhaus Entertainment, before they disbanded in 1995. It is also director Glickenhaus's last feature film before he retired from the industry.

== Plot ==
Young Jesse Adams is the Earth's last line of defense and travels through time trying to stop an alien threat.

== Cast ==
- Jesse Cameron-Glickenhaus as Jesse Adams
- Pat Morita as Isaiah
- Joanna Pacula as Evelyn Adams
- Duncan Regehr as Jonathan Adams
- Michael Dorn as The Chairman
- Michelle Williams as Annie
- Scott Colomby as The Gambler
- Zelda Rubinstein as Betting Clerk
- George Pilgrim as Billy the Kid
- Drew Pillsbury as Doc Holliday
- Nils Allen Stewart as Mordor
- Chris Durand as Bobby Barker
- Bobby Joe McFadden as Pa Barker
- Dave Adams as Deacon Jones
- Gene Okerlund as Bob
- Bobby Heenan as Howard
- Janet Carroll as Ms. Spinell
- Veronica Cameron-Glickenhaus as Veronica
  - Elizabeth Anne Allen as Veronica (16-years-old)
- Lindsey Ginter as Commando Leader

== Production ==
Timemaster was written and directed by James Glickenhaus and stars his own son, Jesse Cameron-Glickenhaus. James also wrote some songs for the movie's soundtrack. The film was shot in Arizona and Death Valley, CA.

== Release ==
=== Home media ===
A LD version was released in 1996.

== Reception ==
The film received overwhelmingly negative reviews. In the TV Guide, the reviewer said that "the utterly disintegrated plot line gives one the feeling that the narrative merely went wherever sets became available, from a smoky biker bar to a mockup of the White House kitchen to a magnificent chalet platform in the mountains, suddenly invaded by commandos for a 007-style chase/gun battle on skis".

The film has been described as a "scrap-heap of pasted-together and semi-coherent genre clichés".

A short review on the German site TV Today stated however, "The time jumps are a bit confusing, but the 'family production' (author and director Glickenhaus filmed with his own children) has a lot of charm and is as dazzling as a comic."

=== Awards and nominations ===
Timemaster was nominated for "Best Genre Video Release" in the 22nd Saturn Awards.
