= Bewitched, Bothered and Bewildered (Buffy the Vampire Slayer) =

- Buffy the Vampire Slayer episode
- Episode no.: Season 2 Episode 16
- Directed by: James A. Contner
- Written by: Marti Noxon
- Production code: 5V16
- Original air date: February 10, 1998

Guest appearances
- Seth Green as Oz; Kristine Sutherland as Joyce Summers; Robia LaMorte as Jenny Calendar; Elizabeth Anne Allen as Amy Madison; Mercedes McNab as Harmony Kendall; Lorna Scott as Miss Beakman; James Marsters as Spike; Juliet Landau as Drusilla; Jason Hall as Devon MacLeish; Jennie Chester as Kate; Kristen Winnicki as Cordette; Tamara Braun as Frenzied Girl; Scott Hamm as Jock

Episode chronology
← Previous "Phases"	Next → "Passion"
- Buffy the Vampire Slayer season 2

"Bewitched, Bothered and Bewildered" is episode 16 of season two of Buffy the Vampire Slayer. It was written by Marti Noxon and first broadcast on The WB on February 10, 1998.

In this episode, Cordelia breaks up with Xander after her friends mock her. Xander retaliates by attempting a love spell to "put her through the same hell", and he gets a little more than he had bargained for.

== Plot ==
During a patrol through the cemetery, Xander shows Buffy a silver necklace he intends to give to Cordelia the following night for Valentine's Day. The next day at school, Xander witnesses Amy Madison use magic to avoid a homework assignment. Soon after, Giles runs into Jenny Calendar; however, their relationship remains frosty, with Giles deciding talking to Buffy is more important than making amends with Jenny. Giles warns Buffy that Angelus becomes particularly vicious around Valentine's Day, and suggests she stays indoors for the following nights. Meanwhile, Cordelia is insulted by Harmony and the Cordettes, revealing to Cordelia that her relationship with Xander is not as secret as she once thought.

Angel competes with Spike for Drusilla's affection. Spike, who is still in a wheelchair after the events of "What's My Line," gives her a gold necklace, whereas Angel gives her a human heart, fresh and bloody, saying, "I knew you'd like it. I found it in a quaint little shop girl."

Xander gives the necklace to Cordelia, but she breaks up with him under pressure from her friends. Xander is heartbroken, and blackmails Amy into casting a love spell upon Cordelia so he can take revenge by breaking up with her. However, as he intended to use the spell for revenge rather than its true purpose, the magic goes wrong, with Cordelia becoming the only woman not to be affected by the spell (protected by her necklace).

The following day, Xander is shocked to find Cordelia repels his advances, and retreats to the library. Buffy makes it clear that she is attracted to Xander, but Amy interrupts them and tells Xander she believes the spell went wrong. She begins to act similarly to Buffy, so Xander rushes home and finds Willow in his bed, where she attempts to seduce him.

The following day, all of the girls of Sunnydale High obsessively start following Xander around the corridors and Harmony criticises a shocked Cordelia for breaking up with Xander. Xander seeks help from Giles, who is appalled by Xander's foolishness. Giles goes looking for Amy, so that she can reverse the spell, while Xander barricades himself in the library. However, Buffy gets in and attempts to seduce a reluctant Xander. Amy also arrives, and becomes jealous of Buffy, ultimately casting a spell that changes Buffy into a rat. An angry Giles orders Xander to go home, while he attempts to make Amy reverse the spells. Oz looks for the Buffy-rat to ensure that she is not hurt.

As Xander is leaving the school, he finds the spell is becoming stronger and more uncontrollable. He saves Cordelia from an attack by Harmony and a group of girls. Xander and Cordelia seek shelter in Buffy's home, locking Joyce out when she too falls under the spell. While in Buffy's room, Xander is pulled out of the window by Angelus, who intends to kill him to upset Buffy. Xander is saved by an infatuated Drusilla. Just as Drusilla is about to turn Xander into a vampire, a group of girls from the school arrive to save him, then Cordelia saves him from the girls. Xander barricades himself in the basement with Cordelia, who is touched to learn that Xander performed the spell for her. The love-crazed mob breaks through the door and attacks Xander and Cordelia just as Giles and Amy manage to lift the spell. Buffy regains human form and the mob disperse, uncertain of why they were there in the first place. The next day Buffy and Xander talk about events and decide it could be worse. Cordelia comes by with her friends and they make fun of Xander when Cordelia suddenly snaps, tells her friends she is way cooler than any of them because she makes up her own mind about what she wants, and she will date who she wants to. She then catches up with Xander and they walk away together holding hands.

== Themes ==
Essayist Theresa Basile compares the episode's complex treatment of the dangerous nature of love spells with the classic Shakespeare comedy A Midsummer Night's Dream. "Giles states that the reason the spell backfired is because Amy performed it improperly. Two other explanations are heavily implied in the episode, though. One potential reason is that Cordelia didn't respond to the spell because she already loved Xander. The other reason is that Xander's intentions behind the spell weren't 'pure'" - Amy tells him, "Intent has to be pure with love spells." Basile says, "Cordelia doesn't really want to break up with Xander, but feels pressured to end the relationship because she doesn't want to lose favor with her popular friends. ... Xander, meanwhile, receives confirmation that even his most sincere, gentle efforts will end in rejection, that even if a girl likes him and he likes her back, she won’t like him enough to stand up to her friends. No wonder his feelings are hurt. At the end of the episode, though, after he does something damaging and colossally stupid, then Cordelia decides to get back together with him. ."

== Reception ==
Vox ranked this episode at #68 out of the 144 Buffy episodes, calling it "a marvel of tonal balancing: The Xander A-plot is slapstick and funny with a core of heartbreak, and the subplot of Angel musing on the perfect Valentine's Day gift for Buffy keeps the menace and subtle horror of the season's central plot running through the background."

Noel Murray of The A.V. Club praised the acting of "Nicholas Brendon, who gets to do slow-burns, double-takes and head-palms — all the classic business of the comic actor — throughout the episode, while also getting to display how deeply wounding this whole Cordelia situation is." He admired the subplot with Angel, "who lurks around the edges of the episode like a malicious presence, reminding Buffy and the audience at home that he could strike at any time."

Reviewer Billie Doux called the episode "a delight from beginning to end. None of that wussy lovey dovey Valentine's Day stuff... It's topical, funny, silly, romantic, clever, horrifying, and has a great moral for all of us: being yourself is more important than pleasing the masses." Mark Oshiro observes that Xander had been "written with one note" and been "running with that for twenty-seven straight episodes. And now, this long character arc has come to fruition in a terrifying and hilarious way," though the episode is difficult, being "inherently about one man violating the consent of EVERY single woman in the entirety of Sunnydale, possibly the world... [T]he show takes what was awful about Xander in the past (his creepy opinions of attractive women) and then actively uses that against him."
