= The Harvest (Buffy the Vampire Slayer) =

- Buffy the Vampire Slayer episode
- Episode no.: Season 1 Episode 2
- Directed by: John T. Kretchmer
- Written by: Joss Whedon
- Cinematography by: Michael Gershman
- Editing by: Skip Schoolnik
- Production code: 4V02
- Original air date: March 10, 1997
- Running time: 46 minutes

Guest appearances
- Mark Metcalf as The Master; David Boreanaz as Angel; Brian Thompson as Luke; Ken Lerner as Principal Bob Flutie; Kristine Sutherland as Joyce Summers; Julie Benz as Darla; Eric Balfour as Jesse McNally; Mercedes McNab as Harmony Kendall; Persia White as Aura

Episode chronology
← Previous "Welcome to the Hellmouth"	Next → "Witch"
- Buffy the Vampire Slayer season 1

The Harvest" is the second episode of the first season of the American supernatural drama television series Buffy the Vampire Slayer. It was written by series creator executive producer Joss Whedon and directed by John T. Kretchmer. The episode originally aired on The WB on March 10, 1997, forming a two-hour premiere with the previous episode, "Welcome to the Hellmouth", and attracted 3.4 million viewers.

Picking up where the feature film left off, Buffy Summers and her mom move to Sunnydale, California, for a fresh start, unaware of the evil lurking in this quiet suburb. Somewhat reluctant in her role as the slayer, Buffy quickly makes friends and enemies at her new school. While also meeting her new "Watcher," Giles, the mercurial school librarian, her newly assembled team encounters the ever-abundant unearthly creatures in Sunnydale.

Although the episode originally aired with "Welcome to the Hellmouth", in subsequent reruns and home media releases, the two episodes are typically presented separately.

== Plot ==
Luke (Brian Thompson) attempts to bite Buffy (Sarah Michelle Gellar), who is trapped in a stone coffin, but Buffy manages to fend him off.

Buffy escapes the mausoleum and rescues Xander (Nicholas Brendon) and Willow (Alyson Hannigan) from the vampires in the cemetery. Meanwhile, Darla (Julie Benz) has taken Jesse (Eric Balfour) underground. She and Luke inform the Master (Mark Metcalf) that the girl they fought is likely the Slayer. The Master decides to use Jesse as bait to lure Buffy to him.

In the library, Giles (Anthony Head) and Buffy give Xander and Willow a brief introduction to the world of vampires, demons, and Slayers. Willow uses a computer to access the city council's plans for Sunnydale's tunnel system. Recalling her encounter in the mausoleum, Buffy deduces that it connects to the underground tunnels. Although she declines Xander's offer to help, he follows her anyway.

While researching the Master in the computer lab, Willow overhears Cordelia (Charisma Carpenter) and Harmony (Mercedes McNab) speaking negatively about Buffy. When Willow defends Buffy, Cordelia insults her. In response, Willow suggests Cordelia press the "DEL" key to deliver her assignment, causing Cordelia to delete her work.

Buffy skips school to search for hidden tunnels in the cemetery. Inside the mausoleum, the mysterious stranger reappears and introduces himself as Angel. He gives Buffy directions to the Master's lair before wishing her luck once she is out of earshot.

Xander catches up with Buffy, determined to help rescue Jesse. They enter the tunnels and find Jesse, who leads them to a dead end before revealing he has been turned into a vampire. Buffy and Xander are ambushed but manage to escape through a manhole. Underground, the Master punishes the vampire Colin by gouging out his eye as punishment for failing to capture them.

Luke (Brian Thompson) drinks the Master's blood and has a symbol drawn on his brow, transforming him into the Vessel. Each soul Luke claims strengthens the Master's ability to break free from his imprisonment.

Buffy and Xander return to the school library, where Giles explains that the Master arrived 60 years earlier intending to open the Hellmouth, a portal to another dimension, but was trapped by an earthquake. The Master now seeks to escape using the Vessel during a once-in-a-century event known as the Harvest. To prevent this, they must kill the Vessel. Xander suggests that the vampires will gather at the Bronze.

On her way there, Buffy stops by her house to retrieve weapons but is promptly grounded by her mother, Joyce (Kristine Sutherland), who has been contacted by Principal Flutie (Ken Lerner) about Buffy skipping classes. Buffy retrieves her weapons from a hidden compartment in a chest and climbs out of her bedroom window. Giles, Xander, and Willow head to the Bronze to help her, with Giles warning Xander that the Jesse they knew is gone and all that remains is the creature that killed him.

Luke and other vampires burst into the Bronze, attacking those inside. Buffy arrives just in time to save Cordelia before Luke can bite her and notices the Vessel mark on his forehead. Xander kills Jesse after a fleeing woman accidentally pushes him into Xander's stake. Willow pours holy water on Darla as she attempts to bite Giles, forcing Darla to flee in pain.

After shattering a window, Buffy tricks Luke into believing a streetlight is sunlight, then stakes him in the back when he realizes it is still night. Luke’s death causes the Master's plan to fail and weakens him. The other vampires flee, and outside the Bronze, Angel recognizes that Buffy has stopped the Harvest.

The next morning, Cordelia reflects the denial common among Sunnydale residents following paranormal events as she recounts the previous night to a fellow student. Giles warns the group of more battles to come. Buffy, Willow, and Xander walk away, discussing how Buffy might get herself expelled. Giles watches them and mutters, "The Earth is doomed."

== Production ==
Whedon hoped to include actor Eric Balfour in the title credits to shock viewers when his character dies. Unfortunately, the show could not afford the extra set of title credits at the time.

Music included in this episode includes:

- "Right My Wrong" by Sprung Monkey features in this episode as Buffy attempts to leave Sunnydale High but is stopped by Principal Flutie.
- "Wearing Me Down" by Dashboard Prophets plays as Cordelia goes out on the dance floor at The Bronze.
- "Ballad for Dead Friends" by Dashboard Prophets plays as Jesse gets Cordelia to dance with him.

=== Writing ===
Although it is never revealed in the series, the Master's real name as listed in the script of this episode is Heinrich Joseph Nest.

Joss Whedon noted in the commentary for this episode that he felt horrible for giving Eric Balfour so many lines with "s" in them, which he had to recite while in "Vamp-face". He had such a difficult time getting the lines out around the prosthetics that new ones were designed for vampire characters who needed to speak frequently. The older-style prosthetics were given to vampire lackeys with few or no lines in subsequent episodes.

== Culture references ==
When storming the Bronze, Buffy references The Wild Bunch, a Western where all the remaining characters are killed in the final shootout.

== Novelization ==
- Richie Tankersley Cusick: Buffy the Vampire Slayer. The Harvest. Simon Pulse ISBN 9780671017125

== Broadcast and reception ==
"The Harvest" originally aired in feature-length format alongside part one, "Welcome to the Hellmouth", on March 10, 1997, on The WB. The broadcast attracted 3.4 million viewers.

Vox ranked it at #99 on their "Every Episode Ranked From Worst to Best" list (to mark the 20th anniversary of the show), remarking on Jesse's death, "not because Xander screwed up his courage and found his inner hero, but because someone accidentally pushed him while they ran by," and saying that the moment "goes a long way toward defining Buffy's tone from very early on."

Noel Murray of The A.V. Club gave "The Harvest" a grade of B+, writing that it helped set the precedent for the series. However, he criticized some of the action scenes for a "lapse into mano-a-mano action-horror clichés" and felt that the resolution was anticlimactic. A review from the BBC stated that the episode was allowed "more time to breathe" than "Welcome to the Hellmouth" and praised the fight choreography and the developing characters.

Rolling Stone ranked "The Harvest" at #116 on their "Every Episode Ranked From Worst to Best" list, writing that the show "took a little time to find its feet," but calling it a "fine episode with some great moments — Darla and her fellow vamps walking toward The Bronze as that very particular style of 90s grunge kicks in standing out as a particular highlight." The episode "establishes a core theme of the show at large. Buffy's greatest strength isn't just her power but the family she surrounds herself with, and they're instrumental in helping avert this disaster."

"The Harvest" was ranked at #51 on Paste Magazine's "Every Episode Ranked" list and #52 on BuzzFeed's "Ranking Every Episode" list.
