= The Long Way Home (Buffy comic) =

2007 comic arc

- Cover of Buffy the Vampire Slayer Season Eight: The Long Way Home trade paperback collector's edition Art by Jo Chen
- Publisher: Dark Horse Comics
- Publication date: March – June 2007
- Genre: Action/adventure, horror; Based on Buffy the Vampire Slayer; Vampire
- Title(s): Buffy the Vampire Slayer Season Eight #1-4
- Main character(s): Buffy Summers; Xander Harris; Willow Rosenberg; Dawn Summers; Rupert Giles; Andrew Wells; Amy Madison; Warren Mears

Creative team
- Writer: Joss Whedon
- Penciller: Georges Jeanty
- Inker: Andy Owens
- Colorist: Dave Stewart

With respect to the Buffy the Vampire Slayer franchise
- The material covered in this article is a continuity issue in the canon of Buffy the Vampire Slayer.

"The Long Way Home" is the first arc from the Buffy the Vampire Slayer Season Eight series of comic books, a direct continuation of the television series of the same name. It is written by creator Joss Whedon. It ran for four issues. The first issue was released on March 14, 2007, and the final issue of the arc was released on June 6, 2007. A collected edition of the arc was released on November 14, 2007.

== Plot ==
=== Part I (Issue #1) ===
Buffy is leading a squad of Slayers—including three named Leah, Rowena, and Satsu—in a raid on a large, dilapidated church protected by a forcefield. She reveals that there are at least 1800 Slayers now active, 500 of whom are working with the Scooby Gang spread over ten squads. There are two Slayers posing as decoys of her, lest she become an easy target; one literally underground and another in Rome publicly partying and dating the Immortal. Working with Xander, who is running things at Slayer headquarters in Scotland (Buffy refers to him as a Watcher despite his objections) with a team of computer workers, psychics and mystics, including a Slayer named Renee, Buffy and her squad find three monstrous demons. There are also three dead humans.

The demons are killed in battle. The humans have odd symbols carved in their chest and there are nearby automatic weapons. Buffy tells Xander to send a copy of the symbol to Giles, when another Slayer finds the machine that generated the force field, also presumably belonging to the victims. There is a shadowed spy nearby.

In Sunnydale, General Voll of the United States Army surveys the crater left after the collapse of the Hellmouth, calling the Slayers a threat to the United States government and likening their squads to terrorist cells. A government expedition is being led sixty feet under the Hellmouth, but is cut short when one of the exploratory members encounters something.

Buffy takes a break from studying the symbol to talk to Dawn. She is now giant-size; the others believe it was because her ex-boyfriend is a 'Thricewise' but Dawn remains quiet on the topic. The two have been feuding since the destruction of Sunnydale. It is revealed the government is working with Amy Madison who wants to destroy the Slayers. Amy has an ally that Voll has captured.

=== Part II (Issue #2) ===
Giles and Buffy, in different locations, are both disappointed in the fighting techniques of the Slayers they are training. They encourage the groups to use teamwork. Buffy compliments the Slayer Satsu on her skills and hair. In Southern Italy, Andrew is outside with a group of Slayers. He tries to go with a lecture on combat techniques but is distracted with talk of Lando Calrissian.

Xander wonders if Dawn has made herself giant sized to gain attention from her sister; Dawn splashes Xander in return. Elsewhere, General Voll and his assistant discuss possible plans to destroy Buffy and her Slayers, from Amy Madison to a nuclear bomb. It's revealed Voll has the same symbol as the victims Buffy found earlier.

Buffy has a sexual dream concerning Xander, which segues into a demon crucifying her. Amy Madison tries to kill Buffy but fails and is trapped inside the castle by magic. However, she succeeds in cursing her with a sleeping spell that can only be lifted by the kiss of true love; later established to be simply one who loves Buffy.

Renee and another Slayer discuss the attraction the former is developing for Xander. Then kilted zombies attack, summoned by Amy. As the Slayers fight the zombies, both sides taking casualties, Buffy is visited in her dreams by a mysterious figure. Willow Rosenberg appears to force Amy to stop the zombies.

=== Part III (Issue #3) ===
The figure in the duster and red shirt is revealed to be Ethan Rayne, a former friend of Giles and chaos-worshipping sorcerer. He reveals that they are trapped within Buffy's dream space, the conglomeration of all of a person's possible dreams. Ethan urges Buffy to escape so she can help the battle raging outside. He gives hints about 'Twilight'.

Amy Madison is defeated, but Buffy is still locked in a coma. Only a kiss from someone who loves her can free her. Willow commands all surrounding her to close their eyes. They do and someone kisses Buffy. She awakens with the cry of "Cinnamon Buns!".

Giles contacts a demon of the same breed as those killed in Part 1, asking for information about the symbol found on the bodies. The demon insists that the symbol is meaningless to his kind. Xander warns Andrew and comforts Renee.

Despite being subdued, Amy's magics transport Willow to an Army base; it is revealed Amy has allied herself with Warren Mears.

=== Part IV (Issue #4) ===
As he prepares to torture and mutilate Willow, Warren tells how Amy found and rescued him from death, she is now his 'skin'.

Buffy's mystical allies will only be able to transport two back to the Army base. Buffy chooses Satsu and borrows her cinnamon lip gloss.

When the portal is opened, Voll has already set up a high powered energy cannon to blast anyone on the other side of the wormhole. Fortunately for Buffy, Xander had already taken the necessary precautions by rigging a large mirror to reflect the energy blast through the portal, destroying the cannon and leaving Voll's squad badly damaged and uncoordinated. Buffy and Satsu then appear through the opening. Slayer Scythe in hand and Satsu at her side, Buffy takes on the entire squad, mortally wounding many. This gives her the perfect leverage for the location of her friend, as Willow will be able to heal them.

Willow is being lobotomized but mysterious elemental beings somehow manifest. They warn her that she cannot come back if she dies at Warren's hands. They inspire her to fight back. She goes 'dark' and frees herself. She slowly heals her injuries. Willow also channels magical energy into Buffy. This and an illusion of Catherine Madison (Amy's body-stealing mother) allows Buffy's group to win, at least temporarily.

Buffy learns they are two miles south of Sunnydale. She discovers Voll has slain Ethan Rayne and is a follower of the concept of 'Twilight', the recurring symbol supposedly means the end of the Slayer line. General Voll believes the Slayers will take power because their demonic origins will corrupt them.

== Production ==
Joss Whedon returns to the series four years after writing the television series finale. Throughout the issues, he slips references to past episodes in the dialogue. Willow's comment "I'd like to test that theory" was first uttered by Giles in season six. Amy's reference that Willow attempted to end the world occurred in "Grave." When Willow's hair turns black, Dawn questions her if she's evil again ("Villains.") Whedon also adds pop-culture references: Xander and Renee discuss Nick Fury, the fictional Marvel Comics character, who wears an eye patch similar to Xander's.

Like Whedon, Georges Jeanty references past episodes as well as pop culture in the artwork. In part 3, Buffy's inner psyche feature images of past characters and events. Such instances include The Master, her mother Joyce Summers, Angel, Faith, Caleb, Buffy's doodled notebook ("The Prom,") Joyce's corpse ("The Body,") and Buffy, Willow, Xander's high school graduation ("Graduation Day.") One image also features Joss Whedon himself. Finally, when Andrew is playing strip poker with the Slayers, one of the girls is reading Fray, the actual graphic miniseries by Joss Whedon comic about a future Slayer. Buffy later time travels to the future and meets Fray.

== Reception ==
The resurrection of the series was both a critical and commercial success. Entertainment Weekly was quoted praising that "creator Whedon effectively sucks devotees back into his Hellmouth."

Elizabeth Anne Allen, who portrayed Amy in the television series commented favourably on the story, describing it as "awesome" and commenting that "[Season Six/Seven] was fun.... but I really would have loved to play Amy in Season 8. She is much darker."

== Timing ==
- Intended to be set after BtVS's seventh season. The story takes place "at least a year and a half" after the events of "Chosen", placing it at its earliest in the latter half of 2004 and after the events of "Not Fade Away".

== Canonical issues ==
This series has been described as 'canon' by both Whedon and various commentators. As the creator of Buffy, Joss Whedon's association with Buffyverse story is often linked to how canonical the various stories are. Since Whedon is writing this arc, it will be seen as a continuation of the official continuity established by Buffy and Angel.

Season Eight contradicts and supersedes information given in the paperback novels set after Season 7, such as Queen of the Slayers and Dark Congress, which are described as being set in an unofficial "parallel" continuity.

Preceded by First Episode	Buffy the Vampire Slayer Season Eight storylines 2007	Succeeded by The Chain
