= The Killer in Me =

- Buffy the Vampire Slayer episode
- Episode no.: Season 7 Episode 13
- Directed by: David Solomon
- Written by: Drew Z. Greenberg
- Production code: 7ABB13
- Original air date: February 4, 2003

Guest appearances
- Anthony Stewart Head as Rupert Giles; Adam Busch as Warren Mears; Tom Lenk as Andrew Wells; Iyari Limon as Kennedy; Elizabeth Anne Allen as Amy Madison; Megalyn Echikunwoke as Vaughne; Rif Hutton as Initiative General; Terence Bernie Hines as Shop Keeper; Anna Maria Maccarrone as Waitress

Episode chronology
← Previous "Potential"	Next → "First Date"
- Buffy the Vampire Slayer season 7

"The Killer in Me" is the 13th episode of the seventh and final season of the television series Buffy the Vampire Slayer. The episode aired on February 4, 2003 on UPN.

== Plot ==
Giles prepares to take all of the Potentials – except Kennedy, who is sick with the flu – on a trip to the desert to meet the First Slayer. Buffy goes to check on Spike, who is determined to remain chained in the basement until they know the First Evil is through with him. Suddenly, Spike begins to writhe in pain as his chip begins firing randomly without provocation. As Buffy and Spike talk about the potential causes of the chip's glitches, Buffy realizes that she will have to contact the people who implanted the chip in the first place: the Initiative.

After failing to reach Riley Finn on the phone, Buffy and Spike go to the Initiative's abandoned base to look for the painkilling drugs that were used on Spike during his captivity there three years before, when the chip was implanted, and for documentation on the chip. Buffy and Spike wander through the remains of the Initiative, finding many dead soldiers and demons. Inside the Initiative's base, Buffy and Spike are attacked by a demon. During the fray, Buffy is wounded by the demon and when Spike tries to help, his chip fires and renders him ineffectual. As the demon grabs Spike and tries to drag him away, Buffy battles with and finally kills the demon. As she crouches down by Spike to see if he is okay, lights turn on, revealing a group of soldiers. Their leader explains that Riley received Buffy's message, and they are there to help Spike. An examination confirms that Spike's chip is killing him, and Buffy must decide whether to repair the chip or remove it.

When Willow goes upstairs to bring Kennedy some tea, she finds that Kennedy is not actually sick, and is instead dressed for a "mission" which she says requires Willow's assistance, involving drinks at The Bronze where they get to know each other. After leaving the bar and returning home, Kennedy gives Willow an end-of-date kiss, with a surprising effect: Willow takes on the appearance of Warren Mears. Panicking, Willow rushes downstairs; on seeing her, the others recoil, partly because they know that the First has appeared to Andrew as Warren. Buffy hits "Warren", showing that "he" cannot be the First, who is incorporeal. When Willow threatens to tell some embarrassing old stories about Xander, the gang provisionally accept her claim.

As Willow and Kennedy attempt to break the spell, Robson, a Watcher, calls Buffy's house from England and reports that Giles may have been killed by a Bringer who had attacked him in London several weeks before. The Scoobies become alarmed when none of them can remember seeing Giles touch or carry anything since his return; no one has hugged him, and he is not driving the car to the desert. Xander, Anya, Dawn, and Andrew all go to the desert to find Giles and, in the case of danger, stop him from hurting the Potentials. Giles is tackled to the ground by the others, who are all pleased to find that he has a solid living form and thus is not the First.

Willow and Kennedy meet with the Wiccan group at the UC Sunnydale, which now includes Amy. Willow runs away as she realizes she is starting to behave like Warren. Kennedy tries to follow, but Willow puts up a magical barrier to keep her away. After the meeting, Kennedy returns to the lecture hall to find Amy packing up as the rest of the group has left. Amy comments on Kennedy's concern for Willow, and draws Kennedy's suspicion when she mentions that Kennedy is a Potential, a fact that neither Kennedy or Willow had mentioned. Willow, increasingly dominated by the Warren persona, goes to buy a gun of the same model that killed Tara and wounded Buffy.

Kennedy confronts Amy, accusing her of causing the "Warren" problem. Amy reveals that she put a hex on Willow, whose effect is determined by the victim's subconscious. She did it because Willow murdered a man and remained beloved – crowning Amy's envy of Willow's relatively easy successes in magic. Amy then teleports Kennedy to the backyard of Buffy's house, where Willow starts to reenact Warren's attack on Buffy that resulted in Tara's death, but Kennedy talks her down. Willow tearfully explains that when Kennedy kissed her she let go of Tara's memory for a moment, making her truly dead. Kennedy kisses Willow again, breaking the spell and restoring Willow to normal.

== Production details ==
=== Writing ===
Each scene with Willow/Warren was filmed twice - once with Alyson Hannigan playing Willow and again with Adam Busch as Warren. Which actor performed the scene first depended upon how "Willow" Warren was supposed to be. That is, when Willow first changes into Warren she acts more or less like Willow; in these early scenes Hannigan would act first so that Busch could somewhat mimic her performance. In later scenes when Warren's personality is more prominent Busch would act first. Because of this decision to use both actors, filming the Willow scenes took much longer than usual. In an interview with the BBC, Elizabeth Anne Allen says, "everything had to be so exact." She explains that if Hannigan or Busch "gestured or moved their head differently from the other person, they had to do the take over again. So that one scene took us a day and a half to shoot."

Anthony Stewart Head was not allowed to touch anything while onscreen for several episodes prior to this one, in order to set up the suspicion that Giles might actually be the First. According to the DVD commentary for this episode, this was apparently quite a pain for all involved. When asked why he set up this misdirection, Joss Whedon says it was "to make people wonder. Just to have a little fun in the sense of pulling a mystery... an exercise, something to spice things up." Whedon wanted to play off the "creepy" idea that "we don't know where the bad guy is, we don't know where he's coming from. Our trusted mentor could be the bad guy."

In the DVD commentary, director David Solomon notes that Iyari Limon had to do a lot of kissing in this episode. He says she joked that her lips hurt after having to do long kisses with both Alyson Hannigan and Adam Busch.

== Cultural references ==
- When Kennedy is teleported into Buffy's backyard she says to herself, "that was a hell of a thing," a reference to Galaxy Quest, mimicking Tony Shalhoub's understated attitude to being teleported for the first time.
- When Buffy and Spike are discussing a solution to Spike's chip's malfunctions, Spike says "Who you gonna call?" making a knowing reference to Ghostbusters.

== Continuity ==
=== Arc significance ===
- What Willow says when she first enters Buffy's backyard with the gun is similar to, though not exactly what Warren says before he shoots Buffy in "Seeing Red". Willow says, "You think you could just do that to me? That I'd let you get away with it?" while Warren says, "You think you could just do that to me? You think I'd let you get away with that?"
- The largely unseen vision quest is implied to be the same as Buffy underwent in "Intervention."
- In this episode the issue of Willow grieving for Tara is directly addressed. It also helps progress the Kennedy/Willow relationship by featuring their first kiss.
- This episode marks the final appearance of The Initiative, and the removal of Spike's chip.
- This is the last episode where Tara is mentioned, however she is mentioned again in the comics.
- This episode marks the eighth and final appearance of Elizabeth Anne Allen as Amy.
- Later, in Buffy the Vampire Slayer Season Eight's "The Long Way Home, Part 4", it is revealed that Amy and Warren (who had survived through Amy) concocted this revenge plan together.

== Continuity issue ==
- In the penultimate episode of Season 4, "Primeval," the government overseers rule that the former Initiative base would be filled with cement to hide evidence of its existence, but in this episode Buffy and Spike find they had not done so.

== Critical reception ==
Vox, ranking it at #110 of all 144 episodes on their "Worst to Best" list, writes, "Many of season seven's most significant missteps involve one of two things: trying to find atonement for Willow in the wake of her dark choices at the end of season six, and her new girlfriend, Kennedy, who's not a terribly interesting character. Here's an episode where those two things collide, when Kennedy and Willow kiss — and Willow transforms into Warren, the man who killed her last girlfriend. There's something interesting here about living with guilt from past relationships, but it could have used another draft."
