= Amy Madison =

Fictional character from Buffy the Vampire Slayer

- Buffy the Vampire Slayer character
- Elizabeth Anne Allen as Amy Madison in 2003.
- First appearance: "Witch" (1997)
- Last appearance: Lost and Found (2015)
- Created by: Joss Whedon, Dana Reston
- Portrayed by: Elizabeth Anne Allen; uncredited rats

In-universe information
- Family: Catherine Madison (mother)
- Classification: Witch
- Notable powers: Powerful magical abilities

Amy Madison is a fictional character on the American television series Buffy the Vampire Slayer, portrayed by Elizabeth Anne Allen; the character is a witch, and is portrayed by unnamed rats for parts of three seasons, having transformed herself but inadvertently losing the human intelligence needed to cast a spell to revert herself. The character – human and rat – appears in every season of Buffy except the fifth.

Although initially a seemingly good-natured individual, Amy gradually begins misusing her magic, eventually becoming an enemy to Willow (Alyson Hannigan) and her friends. In the series' comic book continuation, the character is a villain.

== Appearances ==
=== Television ===
Amy is a classmate of Buffy Summers at Sunnydale High School. In junior high, she would often go over to Willow's house to escape her mother's abuse. The character first appears in the first season episode "Witch", when she and Buffy both try out for the cheerleading squad. At first, Amy performs poorly in the tryouts, but a series of strange injuries to other contestants move her up in the standings. Amy's mother Catherine, a very powerful witch, has switched bodies with Amy because she wants to relive her youth. Buffy and the Scooby Gang succeed in restoring Amy to her own body and (unknown to them) trapping her mother in the cheerleading trophy she won while a cheerleader for Sunnydale High. Afterward, Amy talks to Buffy and mentions that she is now living with her father and step-mother, and that she is much happier.

The character appears as a Sunnydale student in other episodes. In the second season episode "Bewitched, Bothered and Bewildered", Xander Harris discovers that Amy inherited her mother's power. Xander blackmails Amy into helping him perform a love spell on Cordelia Chase, however, the spell goes awry and causes the entire female population of Sunnydale, except Cordelia, to become infatuated with Xander. Under the influence of her own spell, a jealous Amy invokes the goddess Hecate and temporarily turns Buffy into a rat. Eventually, Rupert Giles forces Amy to undo both spells.

In season 3, the character has joined a coven with Willow (now a practicing witch) and warlock Michael Czajak. In the episode "Gingerbread", the parents of Sunnydale (under the influence of the demonic Hans and Greta) become paranoid about the supernatural's influence on their children, and prepare to burn Amy, Buffy, and Willow at the stake. To escape her bonds, Amy turns herself into a rat, but is then unable to remove her own spell. Willow captures Rat-Amy and keeps her in a cage. Willow makes several unsuccessful attempts to return Amy to human form over the next two seasons. In the season 4 episode "Something Blue", Willow accidentally turns Amy back into a human, but Willow does not notice, and accidentally changes the character back into a rat. Doug Petrie, a writer on the show, describes this series of events as "as cruel and funny as anything could be".

By the sixth season, Willow has become an extremely powerful witch and permanently "de-rats" Amy. The two become friends again, though Amy now seems to be drastically different. The character had been involved with the warlock Rack before becoming a rat. Amy gets Willow involved, leading her to become addicted to black magic. Later, when Willow decides to give up magic, Amy casts a spell on her, causing her to magically manipulate everything she touches for a while; Willow complains that Amy's actions are encumbering her attempts to quit magic. As a result, Willow cuts Amy out of her life entirely.

Amy's final appearance in the television series occurs in the season 7 episode "The Killer in Me." Elizabeth Anne Allen said, "I think after all the things that she went through, there were a lot of reasons why she was so angry."

Having physically transformed into Warren Mears, whom she tortured and flayed in a rage over the murder of her girlfriend Tara Maclay, Willow seeks help from the UC Sunnydale Wicca Group and discovers that Amy is a member. Amy explains that she had hit "rock bottom", and was doing better now. However, Amy is responsible for transforming Willow, apparently out of jealousy and spite. Allen says she would have liked to explore Amy's struggle to overcome her anger, so that she could "get a grip and come back to the fold with her friends."

=== Literature ===
Amy makes minor appearances in several ambiguously canon novels set before the season 3 finale, most notable The Gatekeeper (novel series), where she helps defend Sunnydale from a horde of magical threats while Buffy and her friends are busy elsewhere.

In the first issue of the Season Eight comic book story "The Long Way Home," Amy works together with the US Army to locate and attack Buffy.

Later, in "Time of Your Life," Amy and Warren are shown working under direct orders from Twilight. Together they construct a missile covered in mystical runes and candles and use it to destroy a Scottish citadel, killing seven of the many Slayers residing there. When Twilight betrays Amy and Warren, she attempts to switch sides and forms a truce with Buffy in "Twilight." In the final arc, "Last Gleaming," Amy and Warren have fled far from the final battle scene. At its conclusion, after Buffy destroys an ancient relic and effectively brings about the end of magic on Earth, the spell keeping Warren alive breaks, and Amy watches as he suddenly turns into a pile of blood and bones.

Amy also appears in the second volume of Angel & Faith, tying into Buffy the Vampire Slayer Season Ten, in issue four. In the story, magic was recently restored to the world at the conclusion of Buffy Season Nine, while London in Angel & Faith was the site of a failed attempt by Whistler to restore magic which resulted in the mass mutation of locals in one borough, creating the ghetto known as 'Magic Town.'

== Powers and abilities ==
In the television series, Amy possesses formidable witchcraft abilities that she has inherited from her maternal lineage, and these powers undergo significant augmentation over the course of the series. Initially, Amy's magical prowess surpasses that of Willow, as demonstrated when she casts a rat-transformation spell that initially stumps Willow's attempts at reversal. However, in season 7, Amy concedes that Willow has eclipsed her in magical proficiency. In the comic book, Season Eight, she is significantly stronger.

== Romantic interests ==
- Xander Harris - After a spell Amy casts which was supposed to make Cordelia love Xander goes wrong, she, along with every other woman in Sunnydale, falls in love with Xander ("Bewitched, Bothered and Bewildered"). This attraction ends after Rupert Giles gets Amy to reverse the spell.
- Larry Blaisdell - Amy stated that she thought Larry was considering asking her to the prom, apparently unaware he was gay and the fact that the graduation of her class occurred three years before, when Larry died.
- Warren Mears - Amy's skinless boyfriend in Season Eight. It is revealed in "The Long Way Home" that the two had been in a relationship since "Villains"; after Warren was flayed alive by Willow, Amy saved his life. Amy refers to Warren as "sweetie", while he claims that "her magic is my skin."

== Appearances ==
Amy has appeared in 32 canonical Buffyverse episodes and comics.

Buffy the Vampire Slayer
Amy appeared as a guest in eight episodes:

- Season 1 (1997) - "Witch"
- Season 2 (1998) - "Bewitched, Bothered and Bewildered"
- Season 3 (1999) - "Gingerbread"
- Season 4 (1999) - "Something Blue"
- Season 6 (2001–02) - "Smashed"; "Wrecked"; "Doublemeat Palace"
- Season 7 (2003) - "The Killer in Me"

Buffy the Vampire Slayer Classics

- "Bad Blood, Part Three: A Boy Named Sue"

Buffy the Vampire Slayer Season Eight

- "The Long Way Home, Parts 1-4"
- "Time of Your Life, Part 1 & 4"
- "Retreat, Part 2, 3 & 5"
- "Twilight, Part 1-4"
- "Last Gleaming, Part 1, 3 & 4"

Buffy the Vampire Slayer Season Ten

- "Where the River Meets the Sea, Part 1 & 4"
- "Lost and Found, Part 1-5"
