= Xander Harris =

Character in Buffy the Vampire Slayer

- Buffy the Vampire Slayer character
- Nicholas Brendon as Xander Harris in 2001.
- First appearance: "Welcome to the Hellmouth" (1997)
- Last appearance: Finale (2018)
- Created by: Joss Whedon
- Portrayed by: Nicholas Brendon; Kelly Donovan (Xander double)
- Voiced by: Nicholas Brendon

In-universe information
- Occupation: Construction worker and repairman
- Affiliation: Scooby Gang
- Family: Anthony Harris (father); Jessica Harris (mother)
- Significant other: Anya Jenkins (ex-fiancée)
- Relatives: Rory Harris (uncle); Carol Harris (cousin); Karen Harris (cousin)
- Classification: Human
- Notable powers: Vague knowledge of military training, tactics, and weapons handling Vampire hunting Melee combat

Alexander Lavelle Harris is a fictional character created for the action-horror/fantasy television series Buffy the Vampire Slayer (1997–2003). He was developed by Joss Whedon and portrayed throughout the television series by Nicholas Brendon and in two episodes by his twin brother, Kelly Donovan. He was conceived as an everyman and a male character for series heroine Buffy Summers (Sarah Michelle Gellar) to interact with, and to provide comic relief in the series. Xander is one of several friends of Buffy who assist her in saving the world against numerous supernatural events that plague Sunnydale, California, a town built over a doorway to hell.

Xander is based in part on Whedon himself, particularly in his high school years; as such, he is often the most geeky as well as witty and verbose of Buffy's characters. The character's overriding arc through the series has been his struggle towards maturity and earning the respect of others. In the canonical comic book continuation of the series, Buffy the Vampire Slayer Season Eight (2007–2011), Xander comes to achieve these goals in becoming the tactical leader of a global army of Vampire Slayers alongside Buffy.

Academic attention to the character has frequently come in the form of gender studies or with a focus on social class, reflecting Xander's working class home life and his fears of inadequacy. However, Xander's unique position as both outside and within the main group enhances his insight into the other characters, especially as the series continues; in Season Eight, he is Buffy's unofficial "Watcher", who watches over her and has a clear perspective. Critics have noted that although Xander frequently exhibits a struggle of masculinity, his storylines often focus on his romantic conquests. Following his unreciprocated love for Buffy, these include the tumultuous relationship with rich girl Cordelia Chase (Charisma Carpenter), brief fling with his best friend Willow (Alyson Hannigan) and his long-term relationship with ex-demon Anya (Emma Caulfield). In Season Eight, the character's older-brother relationship with Buffy's little sister Dawn (Michelle Trachtenberg) also develops along romantic lines, too late for Buffy to act on her recognition of her own compatibility with Xander.

The character of Xander Harris also appears in numerous items in the series Expanded Universe, such as comic books, tie-in novels and video games.

== Appearances ==
=== Television ===
Xander, as he appeared during the first season.

Xander Harris is introduced in season 1's (1997) two-part premiere "Welcome to the Hellmouth"/"The Harvest". Xander meets Buffy Summers (Gellar), the Slayer, on her first day at Sunnydale High, as well as her Watcher Rupert Giles (Anthony Head). While in the library, he secretly listens in on a conversation between Buffy and Giles in which she identifies herself as the Slayer. After his friend Jesse (Eric Balfour) is made a vampire, Xander accidentally kills him, resulting in him resenting vampires. Xander and his best friend Willow (Hannigan) become Buffy's reliable sidekicks. He pines for Buffy's romantic affection, oblivious to Willow's affections for him, and distrusts Buffy's boyfriend, the ensouled vampire Angel (David Boreanaz). Typically, Xander is a target for bullies at school, but one dangerous situation forces him to pummel a man for the first time and was surprised of knowing that he can throw a powerful punch, and later he finds that he can even stagger a lesser vampire. In the season finale, "Prophecy Girl", Xander saves Buffy's life by administering CPR after she is drowned by the Master (Mark Metcalf).

In season 2 (1997–1998), Xander begins a turbulent and ambiguous relationship with popular girl Cordelia Chase (Carpenter) after they are thrown together in several life-or-death situations. He tells Willow that she is his best friend but that he has no romantic feelings for her, to Willow's dismay. Xander is briefly turned into a soldier in the episode "Halloween", and retains extensive military knowledge and training thereafter; in "Innocence", this knowledge proves essential to helping Buffy defeat a demon known as The Judge who had been believed practically invincible. In times, Xander gradually honed his fighting capabilities after a chain of events against supernatural and human threats. When Cordelia decides she needs to break up to preserve her social status, Xander coerces witch Amy Madison (Elizabeth Anne Allen) to cast a love spell, which misfires; Cordelia is unaffected but, seeing how much Xander loves her, reunites with him in defiance of her former friends, in "Bewitched, Bothered and Bewildered". The episode "Go Fish" focuses on Xander, after he joins the swim team to investigate the disappearances of Sunnydale High swimmers. In the season finale "Becoming, Part Two", Xander decides not to tell Buffy about Willow's plan to re-ensoul Angel—who has lost his soul, reverted to his vampire persona Angelus, and is going to bring about the apocalypse— so that she will not hesitate to kill him in order to save the world. Buffy is surprised and grief-stricken when Angel regains his soul moments before she must kill him.

Season 3 (1998–1999) begins with Xander and his friends slaying demons since Buffy ran away to Los Angeles. Some time after Buffy's return, Xander sees Angel and Buffy together and rushes to tell Giles of Angel's return in "Revelations". Xander and the others confront Buffy, angry that she concealed Angel's return. While still angry, Xander tells Faith that Angel is alive. When Faith decides to slay Angel, Xander is eager to join her. When Cordelia catches Xander kissing Willow in "Lovers Walk", she dumps him. They ultimately part as friends, although only after an extended period of mutual antagonism. "The Zeppo" is a comedic episode focusing on Xander: the episode begins with Cordelia mocking him as a "loser", which upsets him. A solo adventure begins when the rest of the Scoobies insist he stay away from the dangerous fight with the Sisterhood of Jhe; he borrows his uncle's classic car, loses his virginity to mentally unstable rogue Slayer Faith (Eliza Dushku), and single-handedly stops a band of zombies from destroying Sunnydale High School. His calm handling of the incident significantly enhances his self-confidence and, when again mocked by Cordelia, is unperturbed. Xander takes Anya (Caulfield), formerly vengeance demon Anyanka, to his prom in "The Prom", and his retained military training proves useful in defeating the evil Mayor (Harry Groener) in season finale "Graduation Day".

In season 4 (1999–2000), Xander's feelings of inferiority and isolation increase, as he has not enrolled in college with his friends. Outside the core group, Xander strengthens his relationship with Anya and the two eventually fall in love. In the season 4 climax "Primeval", Xander becomes the "Heart" in the spell, which conjoins him with Buffy, Willow and Giles to defeat Adam (George Hertzberg), a part-demon, part-human cyborg monster. Finale episode "Restless" delves into the characters' psyches through dream sequences; Xander's dream involves his erotic attraction to Buffy's mom (Kristine Sutherland), Willow and her girlfriend Tara (Amber Benson), his fear of his abusive father, and features a re-enactment of 1979 film Apocalypse Now.

In season 5 (2000–2001), Xander matures. He becomes a carpenter and construction worker, and moves into his own apartment with Anya. He comes under the thrall of Dracula in premiere episode "Buffy vs. Dracula", becoming his Renfield. The episode "The Replacement" focuses on the two aspects of Xander: the emotionally sensible, driven man, and the comedic buffoon. Xander-centric episode "Triangle" sees him defend Willow and Anya equally from Anya's ex-boyfriend Olaf the Troll (Abraham Benrubi) when ordered to choose between them. In the season finale, he asks Anya to marry him, and in the final battle he uses a wrecking ball to assist Buffy in defeating the season's villain, hell-goddess Glory (Clare Kramer).

In season 6 (2001–2002), Xander and his friends resurrect Buffy, who had sacrificed herself to close the portal between dimensions opened by Glory, and whose soul they believed had been sent to a Hell dimension as a result. However, Buffy had ascended to a "Heaven" dimension instead, where she existed in bliss, and she sinks into depression after returning to the mortal world. Xander's doubts about his future with Anya are expressed when he summons the all-singing demon Sweet (Hinton Battle), in the musical episode "Once More, with Feeling". A demon exploits these fears in "Hell's Bells"; Xander leaves Anya heartbroken at the altar, and she resumes working as a vengeance demon. In the season finale, when a grief-stricken Willow tries to end the world, only Xander's compassion and love for her is able to stop that apocalypse.

In season 7 (2002–2003), when Buffy's little sister Dawn (Michelle Trachtenberg) mistakenly believes herself to be a Potential Slayer, Xander empathizes with her disappointment over not being the one in the spotlight, in "Potential". The season 7 episode "Conversations with Dead People" is the only Buffy episode in which Xander does not appear. In the episode "Dirty Girls", Xander's left eye is gouged out by the evil preacher Caleb (Nathan Fillion), and he begins wearing an eyepatch. Though he and Anya get back together, in the series finale, "Chosen", Anya is killed by a Bringer's sword. Andrew (Tom Lenk), the only witness to her death, tells him Anya died saving his life. Xander responds, "That's my girl. Always doing the stupid thing."

Though Brendon does not portray Xander again subsequent to "Chosen", the Angel episode "Damage" (2004) mentions that Xander is in Africa, recruiting newly activated Slayers for Buffy's team. Between 2001 and 2004, Joss Whedon and Jeph Loeb developed a 4-minute pilot episode for Buffy the Animated Series, which was set during the show's first season. Had the series been picked up by a network, it would have featured Xander (voiced by Nicholas Brendon) in more adventures set during Buffy's first season. Following a 2008 leak of the pilot to YouTube, Loeb expressed some hope that the series may be resurrected in some form.

=== Literature ===
Xander along with Buffy in the comic book continuation Buffy the Vampire Slayer Season Eight.

Concurrent with the television series, Xander appears in canonical tie-ins to the television series. Xander appears in most Buffy comics and novels (those set within Buffy's Sunnydale years), and is the featured character of several. The Xander Years, Vol 1. and Vol. 2 for instance are each novelization of three key Xander episodes from the show's first three seasons, spanning "Teacher's Pet" to "The Zeppo".

The 2004 comic "Antique" depicts Xander resuming his position as Dracula's loyal manservant at the vampire's Translyvanian castle for several months, before Buffy and two new Slayers rescue Xander. Subsequently, the character appears three years later in the Buffy the Vampire Slayer Season Eight series of comic books. Xander appears from the premiere issue, "The Long Way Home" (2007) by Joss Whedon. In Season Eight, Xander leads the Slayers and operates their central command in Scotland; Buffy describes him as her unwilling "Watcher". Xander invites comparison to Marvel Comics' character Nick Fury. Xander's new relationship with Slayer Renée is cut short when she is killed in "Wolves at the Gate" (2008) by Drew Goddard. Goddard's story is also a continuation to "Antique"; Xander ends his friendship with Dracula. In Jane Espenson's "Retreat" story arc (2009), as Buffy begins to realize she has developed a romantic attraction to Xander, she discovers his newfound romantic relationship with Dawn; Xander had previously been her confidante throughout Season Eight. Buffy tries to explain her feelings to Xander in Joss Whedon's "Turbulence" (2010), though he dismisses these feelings as her need for stability; Xander admits to Buffy, that he truly loves Dawn. In its final arc, "Last Gleaming" (2011), Xander witnesses a possessed Angel kill Giles in the ruins of Sunnydale, as well as Buffy's destruction of the source of all magic. Subsequently, he and Dawn settle down and move to San Francisco, where they allow Buffy to stay with them while she waitresses and hunts vampires by night.

In the follow-up comic book, Buffy the Vampire Slayer Season Nine (2011–14), Buffy has moved out of Xander and Dawn's home, and they have less contact with her than before. Following the events of Season Eight, Xander struggles to control his anger. In "Welcome to the Team" (2012–13), Dawn falls ill and begins to die as a result of magic's absence. What's more, the world, including Xander and Buffy, is slowly forgetting she ever existed. In "The Watcher" (2013), the season's villains, mystical 'Siphon' Severin and rogue Slayer Simone persuade Xander to assist them in their plot to turn back time and avert Twilight. In the final arc, "The Core," Xander supplies them with information from an ancient tome on vampires Buffy owns. Acting on the same information, Buffy and Willow decide that the Deeper Well in England—a prison for ancient demons—may contain enough magic to save Dawn, and Xander travels with them. While entering the Well, Xander confesses his betrayal to Buffy and informs her of Severin's plan to use the magic in the Well to turn back time, which could destroy the universe. He stands beside Buffy when they discover Simone's ulterior motive for entering the Well; she has allowed herself to be sired by the very demon which created the first vampire, transforming herself into a powerful vampire/Slayer hybrid. During battle in the Well Severin dies as he explodes with power. The energy is absorbed by the new Seed of Wonder Willow had created, restoring magic to the world. Buffy dusts Simone and Willow returns everyone to San Francisco and saves Dawn with magic and Buffy's blood. Xander thinks Dawn feels different and is guiltily convinced she somehow knows about his betrayal, despite Buffy forgiving him and telling him he is being too hard on himself.

In Buffy the Vampire Slayer Season Ten (2014–16), Xander has more of a starring role, and the first arc, "New Rules," is co-written by his former portrayer, Nicholas Brendon. Following Season Nine, Xander and Dawn's relationship is strained. Xander, wracked with guilt, is convinced something is odd about her, and has begun talking to possibly hallucinated visions of his ex-girlfriend Anya. He does not know, as Dawn later confesses to Buffy, that she is experiencing intense emotional anguish from reliving her entire life at the moment Willow brought her back. When Dracula rolls in to town to help the Slayer combat the threat of new, more powerful vampires with powers like his, Xander slips back into the manservant role and confesses to Dawn that he knows she does not really love him, which Dawn tearfully admits is true. After Xander is freed from Dracula's influence Dawn admits the truth of her emotional state to him and they agree to end their relationship. However, Xander pledges he will get Dawn to fall in love with him once again.

=== Video games ===
Xander appears in video games based on Buffy. Brendon lent his voice for Xander in the 2002 Buffy game for Xbox and the multi-console 2003 video game Buffy the Vampire Slayer: Chaos Bleeds, in which Xander is a playable character. In the 2002 game, Xander is not a playable character, but Buffy can acquire weapons from him over the course of the game. Chaos Bleeds is set in season 5 of the television series; in Xander's levels, he is sent to an alternate universe. After the level at Sunnydale High, he has to do battle with an alternate universe Anyanka, the level's boss; a magical tophat that releases rabbits evens their playing field slightly. Following the level at the zoo featured in "The Pack", Buffy battles against an evil alternate reality version of Giles, styled "Ripper". Chaos Bleeds prompted prequel comic books published by Dark Horse and a novelisation, which treats it as a "lost" episode of season 5.

== Casting ==
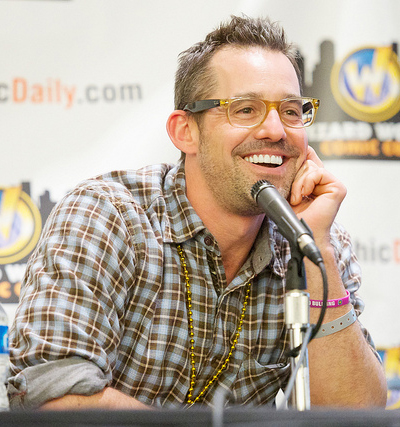
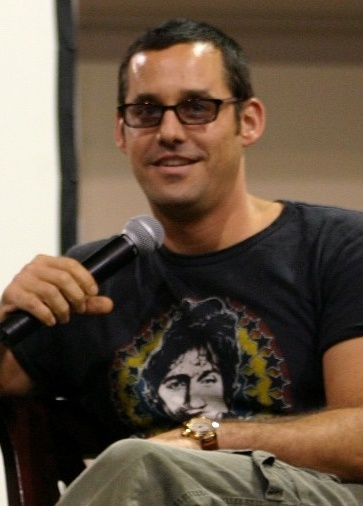
Kelly Donovan (left) would occasionally appear as a stunt double for Nicholas Brendon (right)

Nicholas Brendon's twin brother Kelly Donovan would often stunt double for Xander in the series, most notably in the episode "The Replacement", where dual Xanders appear on-screen at the same time. They both use stage names; their surname is Shultz; as children, they were inseparable. Before landing the role of Xander, Brendon had hit "rock bottom": his girlfriend had left him, he was working as a waiter and could barely afford his rent, and had almost given up on getting good work. After buying the wrong kind of Pop Tarts for his co-workers, his boss fired him and told him "You should be acting." Brendon was attracted to the pilot script for Buffy because of how much he had hated high school. Brendon recognised that Xander was based on Joss Whedon when he had attended high school, accounting for why Xander "gets all the good lines". Brendon did not get much acting work after Buffy finished, and went into an alcoholism rehabilitation centre in 2004. As of 2007, as Niki Stafford notes in her Unofficial Guide, the actor has had comparatively more work since with stage productions.

For the season 5 episode "The Replacement", where a demon splits Xander into two people along the lines of his immature and his more adult characteristics, Donovan is cast to play the "other" Xander in scenes where both appear onscreen together. Both actors found playing the character together to be a fun experience.

== Analysis ==
Cordelia: It must be really hard when all your friends have, like, superpowers; Slayer, werewolf, witches, vampires; and you're, like, this little nothing. You must feel like Jimmy Olsen.
Xander: I was just talking to... hey, mind your own business.
Cordelia: Ooo, I struck a nerve. The boy that had no cool.

— Cordelia mocks Xander for his lack of specialness in "The Zeppo".

One academic analysis of the series finds that Xander has much in common with the Harry Potter character Ron Weasley. The writer cites his proximity to the main character, his comparative working class status to best friend Willow (as with Weasley and Hermione), his status as an object of mockery in school. For both Xander and Ron, their comparative lack of special gifts "accentuates the loyalty and bravery... [each] offers as a friend" given that the characters often place themselves in mortal danger. Cordelia's statement to Xander in "The Zeppo," which compares him to Superman character Jimmy Olsen, is noted as another example qualifying Xander's everyman status.

Though Xander is often "the heart" of the Scooby Gang, in "The Zeppo" he is excluded from their battle against a hydra-like demon. Through the use of jump cuts between melodramatic scenes with Buffy, and for instance, informant Willy the Barkeeper (Saverio Guerra) to Xander and a gang of zombies in a drunken car journey, Xander is used as a vehicle to point out the ways in which Buffy ordinarily avoids being "over the top" by integrating Xander (as the show's source of humour) into the main narrative rather than separating the two. His loss of his virginity to Faith, for example, is musically cued as an anti-romantic parallel to the swelling, symphonic romance scene that Xander oversees between Buffy and Angel; on his departure from the carnal bed, the music is re-cued. The episode depicts Xander single-handedly saving the school, and potentially the world (given the Hellmouth beneath it) from an explosion in simultaneity against glimpses of the other Scoobies' struggles with the hydra demon. As the episode draws to a climax, the two settings begin to erode into one, as the demon breaks through walls in the basement and enters into the episode's Xander scenes. Stevenson notes that it is fitting for the character to have his most heroic moment in the school basement, given that in season 4 he will be reduced to living in his parents'; Xander's fears in "Restless" explore his feeling of being "trapped" in that basement. Wilcox argues that the basement is a representation of the subconscious, and that young carefree zombie Jack O'Toole (Channon Roe) represents Xander's id, his inner desires. The episode brings to light how the basis for heroism rests in the subconscious, and also how as the two battles increasingly merge, his friends cannot hope to save the world and save others unless Xander's battle with the Self is also won. In his confrontation with Jack, just as in his confrontation with Dark Willow in season 6's "Grave", Xander saves the world through his words. As the "warrior of words", Wilcox feels that this makes Xander the character who most clearly represents series creator Joss Whedon.

Throughout the series, Xander's family are seen to be highly dysfunctional and composed of alcoholics. In "Homecoming", he admits to swallowing his pride to borrow a tuxedo from his cousin Rigby, from a wealthier branch of the family, who, as Xander puts it "shun us... as they should". Xander relates in "Amends" that he sleeps outside at Christmas to avoid the family quarrels. This leads him to seek a surrogate family in his friendships with Buffy, Willow and Giles. Xander lacks Giles's and Willow's academic intelligence, and Buffy's physical prowess. Cordelia is initially ashamed to be Xander's girlfriend. Throughout the series, Xander struggles to contribute meaningfully to the group dynamic. His dissatisfaction reaches a nadir in season 4: Xander's physical dislocation from his friends, who are now in college, leads to a profound sense of being useless. In "Restless", his menial jobs and degrading habitat rise to the surface of his dream narrative. Before falling asleep, he begins to watch Apocalypse Now with Willow, Buffy and Giles, who comments, "Oh, I'm beginning to understand this now. It's all about the journey, isn't it." Xander's dream, in turn, is one of intense self-exploration. In his dream, Xander goes to use the bathroom, and is emasculated and infantilized by Buffy asking him if he needs any help: this scene shows Xander's "sense of insecurity and powerlessness". Nevertheless, he becomes lost and finds himself in his parents' basement. From there, he finds himself in his ice cream truck, where Anya asks if he knows what he is doing, underlining the aimlessness of his journey; he is in the basement once again. When suddenly he is in the army and Principal Snyder (as a character in Apocalypse Now) asks where he comes from, he says, "The basement, mostly." He fears that his military interrogator is correct in saying that he is "the whipping boy" and "set on a sacrificial stone". (This position of being less "chosen" for social inclusion and great things than his peers makes him uniquely able to comfort Dawn in season 7's "Potential".)

Although "The Replacement" sets up its narrative as an evil twin television narrative trope, its catch is that both Xanders are in fact the real Xander. In this episode, Xander uncovers that he has the power within himself to be the adult, suave and confident man whom he had spent the episode envying. "The dual Xanders", Stephens argues, "represents the duality in all of us." The episode demonstrates that Xander is not defined by his weaker personality traits but by the core personality that is a merger of his stronger and weaker traits. Xander's costume choices in various Halloween episodes show the audience his desire for macho credence: he comes, variously, as a cowboy, a soldier and as James Bond. As a soldier, he was in fact magically turned into his costume, and got to retain his macho status along with the useful military knowledge. Following this incident, his choice of costume represents explicitly whom he would like to actually become. Various episodes highlight Xander's intense bravery; for example, he faces down evil Angelus (Boreanaz) at Buffy's hospital door in the episode "Killed by Death", and he offers his life in place of Willow's in "Inca Mummy Girl". When Buffy prepares to face Angelus in the season 2 finale, he arrives with a rock in hand saying "Cavalry's here. Cavalry's a frightened guy with a rock, but it's here." Stephens argues that this makes up the essence of Xander's character; though powerless, he is always both loyal and brave. As his relationship with Dawn in "Potential" and his support of Buffy show, Xander finds that his real calling seems to be in his role as the "eternal supporter". One journalist describes the character as a modern-day Greek Chorus, always an outsider looking in, and a version of Joss Whedon himself. One author writes that the focus of Xander's character development has always been his quest for maturity.

While their characters were an item, Brendon was close friends with Charisma Carpenter, who portrays Cordelia. When they broke up on the show, and Cordelia transitioned to the spin-off Angel, he commented that they had hardly spoken due to being in different scenes all the time. This felt like a real-life breakup in many ways. When Xander got to become serious with Anya in season 5, the actor commented that it was nice to see Xander mature after four years of playing the "nerd". Lorna Jowett feels that Xander's romances throughout the season almost seem to "make up" for the character's shortcomings, which Stafford attributes to Xander's origin as Whedon's author surrogate in the show. Anya comments that Xander is "a Viking in the sack" in "The Yoko Factor", indicating not just masculinity but also virility. Within the show, gay character Larry mistakes Xander for being gay, and Xander's unguarded comments towards Spike have led some fans who write fan fiction to depict Xander as being gay. Jowett attributes this to Xander's internal struggles (which concern a crisis of masculinity and his role amongst his friends) do not contain a readily accessible solution for viewers to hold onto. She argues that some fans see this as a "stumbling block", perhaps unconsciously, to recognising the character's masculinity and at a wider level, in constructing a notion of contemporary masculinity.

In the DVD commentary for the episode "Dirty Girls", writer Drew Goddard mentions there was talk of killing off Xander towards the end of season 7 and having the First Evil assume Xander's appearance when conversing with Buffy for the remainder of the season. This was ultimately rejected since Xander was thought to be too important to the series, and his death occurring so late in the season would leave little time to deal with it correctly, and that throughout the series' run, Xander was the one character who never wavered, and to punish that characteristic with death would send a message the staff was not trying to convey. Instead of killing Xander, he was blinded in one eye.

== Reception ==
For his role as Xander, Brendon was nominated for Saturn Award in 1998 and 1999 for Best Genre TV Actor and in 2000 for the Supporting Actor. At least one later critique of Xander's character regarded him less sympathetically as a "Nice Guy™".

=== Impact ===
"The Zeppo" in season 3 was a Xander-centric episode, which only featured the other characters in humorous aside glimpses of their struggle to save the world. This episode has proved very influential on later television writers. In his "Production Notes: Doodles in the Margins of Time" in 2007, Doctor Who executive producer Russell T Davies cites "The Zeppo" along with Star Trek: The Next Generation episode "Lower Decks" as an influence on his 2006 Doctor Who episode "Love & Monsters". The episode provided a television format that came to be known as the "Doctor-lite episode", an annual tradition for Doctor Who from 2006 to 2008, often featuring a significant guest star carrying the bulk of the acting responsibilities as Doctor Who has a much smaller cast than Buffy.
