= Elizabeth Anne Allen =

American actress

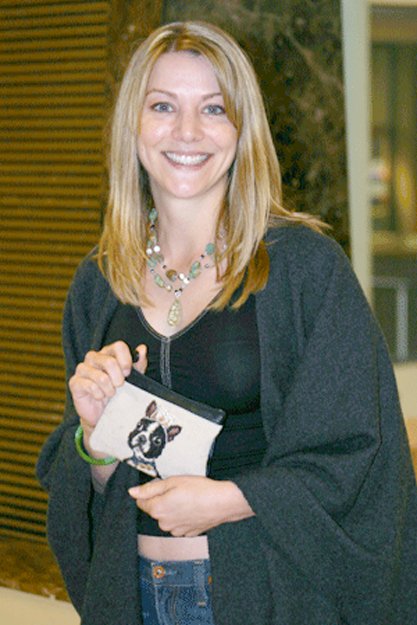
- Allen at the 2004 Flashback convention in Chicago
- Born: November 18, 1979 (age 46); New York, U.S.
- Education: Russell Sage College
- Occupation: Actress
- Years active: 1992–2007

Elizabeth Anne Allen (born November 18, 1979, in New York) is an American former actress. She is best known for her recurring role as the witch Amy Madison on the television series Buffy the Vampire Slayer.

== Career ==
Allen began working professionally as an actress in the early 1990s and has worked in guest and recurring roles on various television series, including Doogie Howser, M.D. and Silk Stalkings. She also had a recurring role in the T.V. series Bull, playing the character Pam Boyd. Her film credits have included roles in Timemaster (1995), Illegal in Blue (1995), and the controversial Silent Lies (1996).

=== Buffy the Vampire Slayer ===
Allen won the recurring role of Amy Madison on Buffy the Vampire Slayer for the season one episode "Witch". She returned in the second season's "Bewitched, Bothered and Bewildered", the season three episode "Gingerbread", and season four's "Something Blue", in a brief, non-speaking cameo. She returned for a three-episode guest arc in the season six episodes "Smashed", "Wrecked", and "Doublemeat Palace". She made her final appearance on Buffy in the season seven episode "The Killer in Me".

Her last credited acting role was in the 2007 episode Making Amends of the television series Close to Home.

== Filmography ==
=== Film ===
Year	Title	Role	Notes
1995	Timemaster	Veronica (age 16)	
1995	Illegal in Blue	Laurie	
1996	Silent Lies	Shelly	
2003	Bill the Intern	Kat	

=== Television ===
Year	Title	Role	Notes
1992	Saved by the Bell	Veronica	Episode: "Screech's Spaghetti Sauce"
1992	Doogie Howser, M.D.	Doogie's Date	Episode: "Nothing Compares 2 U"
1994 & 1996	Silk Stalkings	Danielle Coe / Edie Flynn	2 episodes
1996	Renegade	Becky Nottingham	Episode: "No Place Like Home"
1996	High Tide	Allison	Episode: "Sins of the Mother"
1997–2003	Buffy the Vampire Slayer	Amy Madison	Recurring role
2000	Then Came You	Roxanne	Episode: "Then Came the Immaculate Deception"
2000	Green Sails	Kerri	TV movie
2000–2001	Bull	Pam Boyd	Recurring role
2002	Family Law	Bride	Episode: "Alienation of Affection"
2004	JAG	Ann Sheehy	Episode: "Corporate Raiders"
2006	ER	Melanie	Episode: "Scoop and Run"
2007	Close to Home	Ellen Pinter	Episode: "Making Amends"

== Personal life ==
Allen has stated that her family later moved to Ireland, which she found difficult due to the distance. She mentioned missing her younger brother, who was three years old at the time of the interview. Allen studied psychology at Russell Sage College and has said it helped her understand characters better. She also mentioned enjoying charity work, especially organizing events for children, and expressed an interest in play therapy.
