= Index of articles related to Buffy the Vampire Slayer =

This is an alphabetical list of all articles relating to the fictional "Buffyverse", including Buffy the Vampire Slayer (film and television series), Angel, the comics, and other media. Names of actors and other personnel are bolded to distinguish them from characters and other in-universe articles.

== A ==
- "A Hole in the World" (Angel episode)
- "A New World" (Angel episode)
- Adam (Buffy the Vampire Slayer)
- "After Life" (Buffy the Vampire Slayer episode)
- "After These Messages... We'll Be Right Back!" (Buffy comic)
- **Alexis Denisof**
- "All the Way" (Buffy the Vampire Slayer episode)
- Allen Francis Doyle
- **Alyson Hannigan**
- **Amber Benson**
- "Amends" (Buffy the Vampire Slayer episode)
- **Amy Acker**
- Amy Madison
- **Andy Hallett**
- Andrew Wells
- Angel: After the Fall
- "Angel" (Buffy the Vampire Slayer episode)
- Angel (character)
- Angel season 1
- Angel season 2
- Angel season 3
- Angel season 4
- Angel season 5
- Angel (TV series)
- "Anne" (Buffy the Vampire Slayer episode)
- Anointed One (Buffyverse)
- **Anthony Stewart Head**
- Anya Jenkins
- "Anywhere but Here" (Buffy comic)
- "Are You Now or Have You Ever Been" (Angel episode)
- "As You Were" (Buffy the Vampire Slayer episode)

== B ==
- "Bad Eggs" (Buffy the Vampire Slayer episode)
- "Bad Girls" (Buffy the Vampire Slayer episode)
- "Band Candy" (Buffy the Vampire Slayer episode)
- "Bargaining" (Buffy the Vampire Slayer episodes) (two-part episode)
- "A Beautiful Sunset" (Buffy comic)
- "Beauty and the Beasts" (Buffy the Vampire Slayer episode)
- "Becoming" (Buffy the Vampire Slayer episodes) (two-part episode)
- "Beer Bad" (Buffy the Vampire Slayer episode)
- **Ben Edlund**
- "Beneath You" (Buffy the Vampire Slayer episode)
- "Benediction" (Angel episode)
- "Bewitched, Bothered and Bewildered" (Buffy the Vampire Slayer episode)
- Big Bad
- "Billy" (Angel episode)
- "Birthday" (Angel episode)
- "Blind Date" (Angel episode)
- "The Body" (Buffy the Vampire Slayer episode)
- "Bring on the Night" (Buffy the Vampire Slayer episode)
- Buffering the Vampire Slayer (podcast)
- Buffy studies
- Buffy Summers
- Buffy the Vampire Slayer
- Buffy the Animated Series (undeveloped)
- Buffy the Vampire Slayer (Boom! Studios)
- Buffy the Vampire Slayer: Chaos Bleeds
- Buffy the Vampire Slayer Collectible Card Game
- Buffy the Vampire Slayer (film)
- Buffy the Vampire Slayer (handheld game)
- Buffy the Vampire Slayer in popular culture
- Buffy the Vampire Slayer: Radio Sunnydale – Music from the TV Series
- Buffy the Vampire Slayer season 1
- Buffy the Vampire Slayer season 2
- Buffy the Vampire Slayer season 3
- Buffy the Vampire Slayer season 4
- Buffy the Vampire Slayer season 5
- Buffy the Vampire Slayer season 6
- Buffy the Vampire Slayer season 7
- Buffy the Vampire Slayer Season Eight
- Buffy the Vampire Slayer Season Nine
- Buffy the Vampire Slayer Season Ten
- Buffy the Vampire Slayer Season Eleven
- Buffy the Vampire Slayer Season Twelve
- Buffy the Vampire Slayer: The Album
- Buffy the Vampire Slayer: Wrath of the Darkhul King
- Buffy the Vampire Slayer (Xbox)
- "Buffy vs. Dracula" (Buffy the Vampire Slayer episode)
- Buffyverse
- Buffyverse canon
- Buffyverse role-playing games

== C ==
- Caleb (Buffy the Vampire Slayer)
- "Carpe Noctem" (Angel episode)
- "The Cautionary Tale of Numero Cinco" (Angel episode)
- "The Chain" (Buffy comic)
- **Charisma Carpenter**
- Charles Gunn (Angel)
- "Checkpoint" (Buffy the Vampire Slayer episode)
- "Choices" (Buffy the Vampire Slayer episode)
- "Chosen" (Buffy the Vampire Slayer episode)
- **Christian Kane**
- **Christopher Golden**
- "City Of" (Angel episode)
- Connor (Angel)
- "Consequences" (Buffy the Vampire Slayer episode)
- "Conversations with Dead People" (Buffy the Vampire Slayer episode)
- "Conviction" (Angel episode)
- Cordelia Chase
- "Couplet" (Angel episode)

== D ==
- D'Hoffryn
- "Dad" (Angel episode)
- **Danny Strong**
- "The Dark Age" (Buffy the Vampire Slayer episode)
- "Darla" (Angel episode)
- Darla (Buffy the Vampire Slayer character)
- **David Boreanaz**
- **David Fury**
- Dawn Summers
- "Dead End" (Angel episode)
- "Dead Man's Party" (Buffy the Vampire Slayer episode)
- "Dead Things" (Buffy the Vampire Slayer episode)
- "Destiny" (Angel episode)
- "Dirty Girls" (Buffy the Vampire Slayer episode)
- "Doppelgängland" (Buffy the Vampire Slayer episode)
- **Doug Petrie**
- **Drew Goddard**
- **Drew Greenberg**
- Drusilla (Buffy the Vampire Slayer)

== E ==
- "Earshot" (Buffy the Vampire Slayer episode)
- **Eliza Dushku**
- **Emma Caulfield**
- "Empty Places" (Buffy the Vampire Slayer episode)
- "Entropy" (Buffy the Vampire Slayer episode)

== F ==
- "Faith, Hope & Trick" (Buffy the Vampire Slayer episode)
- Faith (Buffy the Vampire Slayer)
- "First Date" (Buffy the Vampire Slayer episode)
- First Evil
- "Flooded" (Buffy the Vampire Slayer episode)
- "Forgiving (Angel)" (Angel episode)
- Fray (comic)
- "Fredless" (Angel episode)

== G ==
- "Get It Done" (Buffy the Vampire Slayer episode)
- "The Gift" (Buffy the Vampire Slayer episode)
- "Gingerbread" (Buffy the Vampire Slayer episode)
- "The Girl in Question" (Angel episode)
- **Glenn Quinn**
- Glory (Buffy the Vampire Slayer)
- "Go Fish" (Buffy the Vampire Slayer episode)
- "Goodbye Iowa" (Buffy the Vampire Slayer episode)
- "Graduation Day" (Buffy the Vampire Slayer episodes) (two-part episode)
- "Grave" (Buffy the Vampire Slayer episode)
- "Ground State" (Angel episode)
- "Guise Will Be Guise" (Angel episode)

== H ==
- Halfrek
- "Happy Anniversary" (Angel episode)
- Harmony Kendall
- "The Harvest" (Buffy the Vampire Slayer episode)
- "Hell's Bells" (Buffy the Vampire Slayer episode)
- "Hell Bound" (Angel episode)
- "Help" (Buffy the Vampire Slayer episode)
- "Helpless" (Buffy the Vampire Slayer episode)
- "Hero" (Angel episode)
- "Him" (Buffy the Vampire Slayer episode)
- "Home" (Angel episode)
- "Homecoming" (Buffy the Vampire Slayer episode)
- "The House Always Wins" (Angel episode)
- "Hush" (Buffy the Vampire Slayer episode)

== I ==
- "The I in Team" (Buffy the Vampire Slayer episode)
- "I, Robot... You, Jane" (Buffy the Vampire Slayer episode)
- "I Only Have Eyes for You" (Buffy the Vampire Slayer episode)
- "I Will Remember You" (Angel episode)
- Illyria (Angel)
- "Inca Mummy Girl" (Buffy the Vampire Slayer episode)
- "The Initiative" (Buffy the Vampire Slayer episode)
- "Innocence" (Buffy the Vampire Slayer episode)
- "Inside Out" (Angel episode)

== J ==
- **J. August Richards**
- **James Marsters**
- **Jane Espenson**
- **Jeff Mariotte**
- **Jeffrey Bell**
- Jenny Calendar
- Jonathan Levenson
- **Joss Whedon**
- Joyce Summers
- **Julie Benz**
- **Juliet Landau**

== K ==
- Kate Lockley
- "Killed by Death" (Buffy the Vampire Slayer episode)
- "The Killer in Me" (Buffy the Vampire Slayer episode)
- **Kristine Sutherland**

== L ==
- "Lessons" (Buffy the Vampire Slayer episode)
- "Lie to Me" (Buffy the Vampire Slayer episode)
- "Lies My Parents Told Me" (Buffy the Vampire Slayer episode)
- "Life Serial" (Buffy the Vampire Slayer episode)
- "Lineage" (Angel episode)
- List of Angel characters
- List of Angel comics
- List of Angel episodes
- List of Angel novels
- List of awards and nominations received by Buffy the Vampire Slayer and Angel
- List of Buffy the Vampire Slayer characters
- List of Buffy the Vampire Slayer comics
- List of Buffy the Vampire Slayer episodes
- List of Buffy the Vampire Slayer home video releases
- List of Buffyverse comics
- List of Buffyverse guidebooks
- List of Buffyverse literature
- List of Buffyverse novels
- List of Buffyverse villains and supernatural beings
- List of minor Angel characters
- "Lonely Hearts" (Angel episode)
- The Long Way Home (Buffy comic)
- Love and Death (Angel novel)
- "Lovers Walk" (Buffy the Vampire Slayer episode)
- "Loyalty" (Angel episode)

== M ==
- Maggie Walsh
- **Marti Noxon**
- **Marc Blucas**
- The Master (Buffy the Vampire Slayer)
- Mayor (Buffy the Vampire Slayer)
- **Mere Smith**
- **Michelle Trachtenberg**
- Music in Buffy the Vampire Slayer and Angel
- Mutant Enemy Productions

== N ==
- **Nancy Holder**
- "Never Kill a Boy on the First Date" (Buffy the Vampire Slayer episode)
- "Never Leave Me" (Buffy the Vampire Slayer episode)
- **Nicholas Brendon**
- "Nightmares" (Buffy the Vampire Slayer episode)
- No Future for You (Buffy comic)
- "Normal Again" (Buffy the Vampire Slayer episode)
- "Not Fade Away" (Angel episode)

== O ==
- "Once More, with Feeling" (Buffy the Vampire Slayer episode)
- Once More, with Feeling (Buffy soundtrack)
- "Orpheus" (Angel episode)
- "Out of Mind, Out of Sight" (Buffy the Vampire Slayer episode)
- "Out of My Mind" (Buffy the Vampire Slayer episode)
- Oz (Buffy the Vampire Slayer)

== P ==
- "The Pack" (Buffy the Vampire Slayer episode)
- "Pangs" (Buffy the Vampire Slayer episode)
- "Parting Gifts" (Angel episode)
- "Passion" (Buffy the Vampire Slayer episode)
- "Phases" (Buffy the Vampire Slayer episode)
- "Players" (Angel episode)
- "Potential" (Buffy the Vampire Slayer episode)
- "Power Play" (Angel episode)
- Predators and Prey (Buffy comic)
- "The Price" (Angel episode)
- "Primeval" (Buffy the Vampire Slayer episode)
- Principal Snyder
- "Prophecy Girl" (Buffy the Vampire Slayer episode)
- "The Puppet Show" (Buffy the Vampire Slayer episode)

== Q ==
- "Quickening" (Angel episode)

== R ==
- "Real Me" (Buffy the Vampire Slayer episode)
- **Rebecca Rand Kirshner**
- "Release" (Angel episode)
- "The Replacement" (Buffy the Vampire Slayer episode)
- "Reprise" (Angel episode)
- "Restless" (Buffy the Vampire Slayer episode)
- Retreat (Buffy comic)
- "Reunion" (Angel episode)
- "Revelations" (Buffy the Vampire Slayer episode)
- Riley Finn
- "Rm w/a Vu" (Angel episode)
- Robin Wood (Buffy the Vampire Slayer)
- Rupert Giles

== S ==
- "Sacrifice" (Angel episode)
- "Salvage" (Angel episode)
- "Same Time, Same Place" (Buffy the Vampire Slayer episode)
- "Sanctuary" (Angel episode)
- **Sarah Michelle Gellar**
- "Seeing Red" (Buffy the Vampire Slayer episode)
- "Selfless" (Buffy the Vampire Slayer episode)
- "Sense & Sensitivity" (Angel episode)
- **Seth Green**
- "She" (Angel episode)
- "Shiny Happy People" (Angel episode)
- "The Shroud of Rahmon" (Angel episode)
- "Showtime" (Buffy the Vampire Slayer episode)
- Slayer (Buffy the Vampire Slayer)
- "Sleep Tight" (Angel episode)
- "Sleeper" (Buffy the Vampire Slayer episode)
- "Slouching Toward Bethlehem" (Angel episode)
- "Smashed" (Buffy the Vampire Slayer episode)
- "Smile Time" (Angel episode)
- "Some Assembly Required" (Buffy the Vampire Slayer episode)
- "Something Blue" (Buffy the Vampire Slayer episode)
- "Somnambulist" (Angel episode)
- "Soul Purpose" (Angel episode)
- "Soulless" (Angel episode)
- Spike (Buffy the Vampire Slayer)
- "Spin the Bottle" (Angel episode)
- "Spiral" (Buffy the Vampire Slayer episode)
- **Steven S. DeKnight**
- **Stephanie Romanov**
- "Storyteller" (Buffy the Vampire Slayer episode)
- Sunnydale High Yearbook
- "Superstar" (Buffy the Vampire Slayer episode)
- "Supersymmetry" (Angel episode)
- "Surrogate" (Buffy the Vampire Slayer episode)

== T ==
- "Tabula Rasa" (Buffy the Vampire Slayer episode)
- Tara Maclay
- "Teacher's Pet" (Buffy the Vampire Slayer episode)
- "That Vision Thing" (Angel episode)
- "The Thin Dead Line" (Angel episode)
- "This Year's Girl" (Buffy episode)
- **Thomas Lenk**
- "Through the Looking Glass" (Angel episode)
- **Tim Minear**
- "Time Bomb" (Angel episode)
- Time of Your Life (Buffy comic)
- "To Shanshu in L.A." (Angel episode)
- "Tomorrow" (Angel episode)
- "Touched" (Buffy the Vampire Slayer episode)
- "Tough Love" (Buffy the Vampire Slayer episode)
- "The Trial" (Angel episode)
- Twilight (Buffy comic)
- "Two to Go" (Buffy the Vampire Slayer episode)

== U ==
- Unaired Buffy the Vampire Slayer pilot
- "Underneath" (Angel episode)
- Undeveloped Buffy the Vampire Slayer spinoffs
- Unofficial Buffy the Vampire Slayer productions

== V ==
- Vampire (Buffy the Vampire Slayer)
- "Villains" (Buffy the Vampire Slayer episode)
- **Vincent Kartheiser**

== W ==
- "Waiting in the Wings" (Angel episode)
- "War Zone" (Angel episode)
- Warren Mears
- Watcher (Buffy the Vampire Slayer)
- "The Weight of the World" (Buffy the Vampire Slayer episode)
- "Welcome to the Hellmouth" (Buffy the Vampire Slayer episode)
- Wesley Wyndam-Pryce
- "What's My Line" (Buffy the Vampire Slayer episodes) (two-part episode)
- Whedonesque.com
- "When She Was Bad" (Buffy the Vampire Slayer episode)
- "Who Are You" (Buffy the Vampire Slayer episode)
- Willow Rosenberg
- Winifred Burkle
- "The Wish" (Buffy the Vampire Slayer episode)
- "Witch" (Buffy the Vampire Slayer episode)
- Wolves at the Gate (Buffy comic)
- "Wrecked" (Buffy the Vampire Slayer episode)

== X ==
- Xander Harris

== Y ==
- "The Yoko Factor" (Buffy the Vampire Slayer episode)
- "You're Welcome" (Angel episode)

== Z ==
- "The Zeppo" (Buffy the Vampire Slayer episode)
