= List of Buffy the Vampire Slayer episodes =

Buffy the Vampire Slayer is an American television series created by Joss Whedon that premiered on March 10, 1997. It concluded on May 20, 2003, after seven seasons with 144 episodes in total, plus an unaired pilot episode.

The first five seasons aired on The WB, and in 2001, it transferred to UPN for its final two seasons. In the United Kingdom, the entire series aired on Sky1 and BBC Two, and on TV3 in Ireland. The story line is continued in comic book form in Season 8, Season 9, Season 10, Season 11, and concluded with Season 12.

All seven seasons of the series are available on individual DVD box sets for Regions 1, 2 and 4. Two complete series collections (The Chosen Collection and The Complete DVD Collection) have been released separately for these regions.

== Series overview ==
Season	Episodes	Originally released		
Season	Episodes	First released	Last released	Network
1	12	March 10, 1997	June 2, 1997	The WB
2	22	September 15, 1997	May 19, 1998	The WB
3	22	September 29, 1998	September 21, 1999	The WB
4	22	October 5, 1999	May 23, 2000	The WB
5	22	September 26, 2000	May 22, 2001	The WB
6	22	October 2, 2001	May 21, 2002	UPN
7	22	September 24, 2002	May 20, 2003	UPN

== Episodes ==
=== Season 1 (1997) ===
No. overall	No. in season	Title	Directed by	Written by	Original release date	Prod. code	U.S. viewers (millions)
1	1	"Welcome to the Hellmouth"	Charles Martin Smith	Joss Whedon	March 10, 1997	4V01	4.59
2	2	"The Harvest"	John T. Kretchmer	Joss Whedon	March 10, 1997	4V02	4.59
3	3	"Witch"	Stephen Cragg	Dana Reston	March 17, 1997	4V03	4.63
4	4	"Teacher's Pet"	Bruce Seth Green	David Greenwalt	March 24, 1997	4V04	2.98
5	5	"Never Kill a Boy on the First Date"	David Semel	Rob Des Hotel & Dean Batali	March 31, 1997	4V05	4.09
6	6	"The Pack"	Bruce Seth Green	Matt Kiene & Joe Reinkemeyer	April 7, 1997	4V06	3.42
7	7	"Angel"	Scott Brazil	David Greenwalt	April 14, 1997	4V07	3.39
8	8	"I, Robot... You, Jane"	Stephen Posey	Ashley Gable & Thomas A. Swyden	April 28, 1997	4V08	2.47
9	9	"The Puppet Show"	Ellen S. Pressman	Rob Des Hotel & Dean Batali	May 5, 1997	4V09	2.56
10	10	"Nightmares"	Bruce Seth Green	Story by : Joss Whedon; Teleplay by : David Greenwalt	May 12, 1997	4V10	3.47
11	11	"Out of Mind, Out of Sight"	Reza Badiyi	Story by : Joss Whedon; Teleplay by : Ashley Gable & Thomas A. Swyden	May 19, 1997	4V11	3.36
12	12	"Prophecy Girl"	Joss Whedon	Joss Whedon	June 2, 1997	4V12	3.97

=== Season 2 (1997–98) ===
No. overall	No. in season	Title	Directed by	Written by	Original release date	Prod. code	U.S. viewers (millions)
13	1	"When She Was Bad"	Joss Whedon	Joss Whedon	September 15, 1997	5V01	4.37
14	2	"Some Assembly Required"	Bruce Seth Green	Ty King	September 22, 1997	5V02	4.42
15	3	"School Hard"	John T. Kretchmer	Story by : Joss Whedon & David Greenwalt; Teleplay by : David Greenwalt	September 29, 1997	5V03	4.86
16	4	"Inca Mummy Girl"	Ellen S. Pressman	Matt Kiene & Joe Reinkemeyer	October 6, 1997	5V04	4.70
17	5	"Reptile Boy"	David Greenwalt	David Greenwalt	October 13, 1997	5V05	4.77
18	6	"Halloween"	Bruce Seth Green	Carl Ellsworth	October 27, 1997	5V06	5.88
19	7	"Lie to Me"	Joss Whedon	Joss Whedon	November 3, 1997	5V07	4.98
20	8	"The Dark Age"	Bruce Seth Green	Dean Batali & Rob Des Hotel	November 10, 1997	5V08	5.59
21	9	"What's My Line? (Part 1)"	David Solomon	Howard Gordon & Marti Noxon	November 17, 1997	5V09	5.04
22	10	"What's My Line? (Part 2)"	David Semel	Marti Noxon	November 24, 1997	5V10	5.41
23	11	"Ted"	Bruce Seth Green	David Greenwalt & Joss Whedon	December 8, 1997	5V11	6.09
24	12	"Bad Eggs"	David Greenwalt	Marti Noxon	January 12, 1998	5V12	6.48
25	13	"Surprise"	Michael Lange	Marti Noxon	January 19, 1998	5V13	7.59
26	14	"Innocence"	Joss Whedon	Joss Whedon	January 20, 1998	5V14	7.94
27	15	"Phases"	Bruce Seth Green	Rob Des Hotel & Dean Batali	January 27, 1998	5V15	7.31
28	16	"Bewitched, Bothered and Bewildered"	James A. Contner	Marti Noxon	February 10, 1998	5V16	6.77
29	17	"Passion"	Michael Gershman	Ty King	February 24, 1998	5V17	6.14
30	18	"Killed by Death"	Deran Sarafian	Rob Des Hotel & Dean Batali	March 3, 1998	5V18	6.08
31	19	"I Only Have Eyes for You"	James Whitmore, Jr.	Marti Noxon	April 28, 1998	5V19	5.06
32	20	"Go Fish"	David Semel	David Fury & Elin Hampton	May 5, 1998	5V20	5.13
33	21	"Becoming (Part 1)"	Joss Whedon	Joss Whedon	May 12, 1998	5V21	5.30
34	22	"Becoming (Part 2)"	Joss Whedon	Joss Whedon	May 19, 1998	5V22	6.37

=== Season 3 (1998–99) ===
No. overall	No. in season	Title	Directed by	Written by	Original release date	Prod. code	U.S. viewers (millions)
35	1	"Anne"	Joss Whedon	Joss Whedon	September 29, 1998	3ABB01	7.06
36	2	"Dead Man's Party"	James Whitmore, Jr.	Marti Noxon	October 6, 1998	3ABB02	6.20
37	3	"Faith, Hope & Trick"	James A. Contner	David Greenwalt	October 13, 1998	3ABB03	5.46
38	4	"Beauty and the Beasts"	James Whitmore, Jr.	Marti Noxon	October 20, 1998	3ABB04	6.20
39	5	"Homecoming"	David Greenwalt	David Greenwalt	November 3, 1998	3ABB05	6.53
40	6	"Band Candy"	Michael Lange	Jane Espenson	November 10, 1998	3ABB06	6.35
41	7	"Revelations"	James A. Contner	Douglas Petrie	November 17, 1998	3ABB07	6.46
42	8	"Lovers Walk"	David Semel	Dan Vebber	November 24, 1998	3ABB08	6.00
43	9	"The Wish"	David Greenwalt	Marti Noxon	December 8, 1998	3ABB09	6.32
44	10	"Amends"	Joss Whedon	Joss Whedon	December 15, 1998	3ABB10	6.85
45	11	"Gingerbread"	James Whitmore, Jr.	Story by : Thania St. John & Jane Espenson; Teleplay by : Jane Espenson	January 12, 1999	3ABB11	6.42
46	12	"Helpless"	James A. Contner	David Fury	January 19, 1999	3ABB12	7.00
47	13	"The Zeppo"	James Whitmore, Jr.	Dan Vebber	January 26, 1999	3ABB13	5.93
48	14	"Bad Girls"	Michael Lange	Douglas Petrie	February 9, 1999	3ABB14	6.09
49	15	"Consequences"	Michael Gershman	Marti Noxon	February 16, 1999	3ABB15	5.93
50	16	"Doppelgangland"	Joss Whedon	Joss Whedon	February 23, 1999	3ABB16	6.50
51	17	"Enemies"	David Grossman	Douglas Petrie	March 16, 1999	3ABB17	5.94
52	18	"Earshot"	Regis Kimble	Jane Espenson	September 21, 1999	3ABB18	5.08
53	19	"Choices"	James A. Contner	David Fury	May 4, 1999	3ABB19	5.04
54	20	"The Prom"	David Solomon	Marti Noxon	May 11, 1999	3ABB20	5.22
55	21	"Graduation Day (Part 1)"	Joss Whedon	Joss Whedon	May 18, 1999	3ABB21	5.13
56	22	"Graduation Day (Part 2)"	Joss Whedon	Joss Whedon	July 13, 1999	3ABB22	6.53

=== Season 4 (1999–2000) ===
No. overall	No. in season	Title	Directed by	Written by	Original release date	Prod. code	U.S. viewers (millions)
57	1	"The Freshman"	Joss Whedon	Joss Whedon	October 5, 1999	4ABB01	6.79
58	2	"Living Conditions"	David Grossman	Marti Noxon	October 12, 1999	4ABB02	5.64
59	3	"The Harsh Light of Day"	James A. Contner	Jane Espenson	October 19, 1999	4ABB03	5.09
60	4	"Fear, Itself"	Tucker Gates	David Fury	October 26, 1999	4ABB04	5.98
61	5	"Beer Bad"	David Solomon	Tracey Forbes	November 2, 1999	4ABB05	5.11
62	6	"Wild at Heart"	David Grossman	Marti Noxon	November 9, 1999	4ABB06	6.51
63	7	"The Initiative"	James A. Contner	Douglas Petrie	November 16, 1999	4ABB07	5.65
64	8	"Pangs"	Michael Lange	Jane Espenson	November 23, 1999	4ABB08	5.90
65	9	"Something Blue"	Nick Marck	Tracey Forbes	November 30, 1999	4ABB09	5.42
66	10	"Hush"	Joss Whedon	Joss Whedon	December 14, 1999	4ABB10	5.97
67	11	"Doomed"	James A. Contner	Marti Noxon & David Fury & Jane Espenson	January 18, 2000	4ABB11	5.35
68	12	"A New Man"	Michael Gershman	Jane Espenson	January 25, 2000	4ABB12	6.02
69	13	"The I in Team"	James A. Contner	David Fury	February 8, 2000	4ABB13	4.83
70	14	"Goodbye Iowa"	David Solomon	Marti Noxon	February 15, 2000	4ABB14	4.85
71	15	"This Year's Girl"	Michael Gershman	Douglas Petrie	February 22, 2000	4ABB15	5.75
72	16	"Who Are You?"	Joss Whedon	Joss Whedon	February 29, 2000	4ABB16	4.90
73	17	"Superstar"	David Grossman	Jane Espenson	April 4, 2000	4ABB17	4.11
74	18	"Where the Wild Things Are"	David Solomon	Tracey Forbes	April 25, 2000	4ABB18	3.85
75	19	"New Moon Rising"	James A. Contner	Marti Noxon	May 2, 2000	4ABB19	4.02
76	20	"The Yoko Factor"	David Grossman	Douglas Petrie	May 9, 2000	4ABB20	4.55
77	21	"Primeval"	James A. Contner	David Fury	May 16, 2000	4ABB21	4.85
78	22	"Restless"	Joss Whedon	Joss Whedon	May 23, 2000	4ABB22	4.50

=== Season 5 (2000–01) ===
No. overall	No. in season	Title	Directed by	Written by	Original release date	Prod. code	U.S. viewers (millions)
79	1	"Buffy vs. Dracula"	David Solomon	Marti Noxon	September 26, 2000	5ABB01	5.83
80	2	"Real Me"	David Grossman	David Fury	October 3, 2000	5ABB02	6.17
81	3	"The Replacement"	James A. Contner	Jane Espenson	October 10, 2000	5ABB03	5.34
82	4	"Out of My Mind"	David Grossman	Rebecca Rand Kirshner	October 17, 2000	5ABB04	5.10
83	5	"No Place Like Home"	David Solomon	Douglas Petrie	October 24, 2000	5ABB05	6.41
84	6	"Family"	Joss Whedon	Joss Whedon	November 7, 2000	5ABB06	6.19
85	7	"Fool for Love"	Nick Marck	Douglas Petrie	November 14, 2000	5ABB07	5.66
86	8	"Shadow"	Dan Attias	David Fury	November 21, 2000	5ABB08	4.83
87	9	"Listening to Fear"	David Solomon	Rebecca Rand Kirshner	November 28, 2000	5ABB09	5.48
88	10	"Into the Woods"	Marti Noxon	Marti Noxon	December 19, 2000	5ABB10	4.85
89	11	"Triangle"	Christopher Hibler	Jane Espenson	January 9, 2001	5ABB11	4.85
90	12	"Checkpoint"	Nick Marck	Douglas Petrie & Jane Espenson	January 23, 2001	5ABB12	5.01
91	13	"Blood Ties"	Michael Gershman	Steven S. DeKnight	February 6, 2001	5ABB13	4.89
92	14	"Crush"	Dan Attias	David Fury	February 13, 2001	5ABB14	4.90
93	15	"I Was Made to Love You"	James A. Contner	Jane Espenson	February 20, 2001	5ABB15	5.11
94	16	"The Body"	Joss Whedon	Joss Whedon	February 27, 2001	5ABB16	5.97
95	17	"Forever"	Marti Noxon	Marti Noxon	April 17, 2001	5ABB17	4.29
96	18	"Intervention"	Michael Gershman	Jane Espenson	April 24, 2001	5ABB18	4.73
97	19	"Tough Love"	David Grossman	Rebecca Rand Kirshner	May 1, 2001	5ABB19	4.59
98	20	"Spiral"	James A. Contner	Steven S. DeKnight	May 8, 2001	5ABB20	5.11
99	21	"The Weight of the World"	David Solomon	Douglas Petrie	May 15, 2001	5ABB21	4.76
100	22	"The Gift"	Joss Whedon	Joss Whedon	May 22, 2001	5ABB22	5.22

=== Season 6 (2001–02) ===
No. overall	No. in season	Title	Directed by	Written by	Original release date	Prod. code	U.S. viewers (millions)
101	1	"Bargaining (Part 1)"	David Grossman	Marti Noxon	October 2, 2001	6ABB01	7.65
102	2	"Bargaining (Part 2)"	David Grossman	David Fury	October 2, 2001	6ABB02	7.65
103	3	"After Life"	David Solomon	Jane Espenson	October 9, 2001	6ABB03	5.58
104	4	"Flooded"	Douglas Petrie	Jane Espenson & Douglas Petrie	October 16, 2001	6ABB04	6.03
105	5	"Life Serial"	Nick Marck	David Fury & Jane Espenson	October 23, 2001	6ABB05	5.68
106	6	"All the Way"	David Solomon	Steven S. DeKnight	October 30, 2001	6ABB06	5.23
107	7	"Once More, with Feeling"	Joss Whedon	Joss Whedon	November 6, 2001	6ABB07	5.44
108	8	"Tabula Rasa"	David Grossman	Rebecca Rand Kirshner	November 13, 2001	6ABB08	5.40
109	9	"Smashed"	Turi Meyer	Drew Z. Greenberg	November 20, 2001	6ABB09	5.00
110	10	"Wrecked"	David Solomon	Marti Noxon	November 27, 2001	6ABB10	5.57
111	11	"Gone"	David Fury	David Fury	January 8, 2002	6ABB11	5.16
112	12	"Doublemeat Palace"	Nick Marck	Jane Espenson	January 29, 2002	6ABB12	5.57
113	13	"Dead Things"	James A. Contner	Steven S. DeKnight	February 5, 2002	6ABB13	5.21
114	14	"Older and Far Away"	Michael Gershman	Drew Z. Greenberg	February 12, 2002	6ABB14	5.01
115	15	"As You Were"	Douglas Petrie	Douglas Petrie	February 26, 2002	6ABB15	4.70
116	16	"Hell's Bells"	David Solomon	Rebecca Rand Kirshner	March 5, 2002	6ABB16	5.61
117	17	"Normal Again"	Rick Rosenthal	Diego Gutierrez	March 12, 2002	6ABB17	5.01
118	18	"Entropy"	James A. Contner	Drew Z. Greenberg	April 30, 2002	6ABB18	4.53
119	19	"Seeing Red"	Michael Gershman	Steven S. DeKnight	May 7, 2002	6ABB19	4.06
120	20	"Villains"	David Solomon	Marti Noxon	May 14, 2002	6ABB20	4.96
121	21	"Two to Go"	Bill L. Norton	Douglas Petrie	May 21, 2002	6ABB21	5.31
122	22	"Grave"	James A. Contner	David Fury	May 21, 2002	6ABB22	5.31

=== Season 7 (2002–03) ===
No. overall	No. in season	Title	Directed by	Written by	Original release date	Prod. code	U.S. viewers (millions)
123	1	"Lessons"	David Solomon	Joss Whedon	September 24, 2002	7ABB01	4.99
124	2	"Beneath You"	Nick Marck	Douglas Petrie	October 1, 2002	7ABB02	4.97
125	3	"Same Time, Same Place"	James A. Contner	Jane Espenson	October 8, 2002	7ABB03	4.90
126	4	"Help"	Rick Rosenthal	Rebecca Rand Kirshner	October 15, 2002	7ABB04	5.04
127	5	"Selfless"	David Solomon	Drew Goddard	October 22, 2002	7ABB05	5.02
128	6	"Him"	Michael Gershman	Drew Z. Greenberg	November 5, 2002	7ABB06	4.65
129	7	"Conversations with Dead People"	Nick Marck	Jane Espenson & Drew Goddard	November 12, 2002	7ABB07	4.83
130	8	"Sleeper"	Alan J. Levi	David Fury & Jane Espenson	November 19, 2002	7ABB08	5.03
131	9	"Never Leave Me"	David Solomon	Drew Goddard	November 26, 2002	7ABB09	4.83
132	10	"Bring on the Night"	David Grossman	Marti Noxon & Douglas Petrie	December 17, 2002	7ABB10	4.79
133	11	"Showtime"	Michael Grossman	David Fury	January 7, 2003	7ABB11	4.08
134	12	"Potential"	James A. Contner	Rebecca Rand Kirshner	January 21, 2003	7ABB12	3.61
135	13	"The Killer in Me"	David Solomon	Drew Z. Greenberg	February 4, 2003	7ABB13	3.46
136	14	"First Date"	David Grossman	Jane Espenson	February 11, 2003	7ABB14	4.24
137	15	"Get It Done"	Douglas Petrie	Douglas Petrie	February 18, 2003	7ABB15	3.43
138	16	"Storyteller"	Marita Grabiak	Jane Espenson	February 25, 2003	7ABB16	3.63
139	17	"Lies My Parents Told Me"	David Fury	David Fury & Drew Goddard	March 25, 2003	7ABB17	3.44
140	18	"Dirty Girls"	Michael Gershman	Drew Goddard	April 15, 2003	7ABB18	3.31
141	19	"Empty Places"	James A. Contner	Drew Z. Greenberg	April 29, 2003	7ABB19	3.60
142	20	"Touched"	David Solomon	Rebecca Rand Kirshner	May 6, 2003	7ABB20	4.02
143	21	"End of Days"	Marita Grabiak	Douglas Petrie & Jane Espenson	May 13, 2003	7ABB21	4.06
144	22	"Chosen"	Joss Whedon	Joss Whedon	May 20, 2003	7ABB22	4.87

== Ratings ==
Buffy the Vampire Slayer : U.S. viewers per episode (millions)

Season	Episode number																						Average
Season	1	2	3	4	5	6	7	8	9	10	11	12	13	14	15	16	17	18	19	20	21	22	Average
1	4.59	4.59	4.63	2.68	4.09	3.42	3.39	2.47	2.56	3.47	3.36	3.97	–										3.60
2	4.37	4.42	4.86	4.70	4.77	5.88	4.98	5.59	5.04	5.41	6.09	6.48	7.59	7.94	7.31	6.77	6.14	6.08	5.06	5.13	5.30	6.37	5.74
3	7.06	6.20	5.46	6.20	6.53	6.35	6.46	6.00	6.32	6.85	6.42	7.00	5.93	6.09	5.93	6.50	5.94	5.08	5.04	5.22	5.13	6.53	6.10
4	6.79	5.64	5.09	5.98	5.11	6.51	5.65	5.90	5.42	5.97	5.35	6.02	4.83	4.85	5.75	4.90	4.11	3.85	4.02	4.55	4.85	4.50	5.26
5	5.83	6.17	5.34	5.10	6.41	6.19	5.66	4.83	5.48	4.85	4.85	5.01	4.89	4.90	5.11	5.97	4.29	4.73	4.59	5.11	4.76	5.22	5.24
6	7.65	7.65	5.58	6.03	5.68	5.23	5.44	5.40	5.00	5.57	5.16	5.57	5.21	5.01	4.70	5.61	5.01	4.53	4.06	4.96	5.31	5.31	5.43
7	4.99	4.97	4.90	5.04	5.02	4.65	4.83	5.03	4.83	4.79	4.08	3.61	3.46	4.24	3.43	3.63	3.44	3.31	3.60	4.02	4.06	4.87	4.31

Audience measurement performed by Nielsen Media Research

== See also ==
- Buffy the Vampire Slayer (film)
- List of Buffy the Vampire Slayer home video releases
- Buffy the Vampire Slayer Season Eight
- List of Angel episodes
