= The Body (Buffy the Vampire Slayer) =

- Buffy the Vampire Slayer episode
- Episode no.: Season 5 Episode 16
- Directed by: Joss Whedon
- Written by: Joss Whedon
- Production code: 5ABB16
- Original air date: February 27, 2001
- Running time: 44 minutes

Guest appearances
- Kristine Sutherland as Joyce Summers; Amber Benson as Tara Maclay; Randy Thompson as Dr. Kriegel

Episode chronology
← Previous "I Was Made to Love You"	Next → "Forever"
- Buffy the Vampire Slayer season 5

"The Body" is the sixteenth episode of the fifth season of the supernatural drama television series Buffy the Vampire Slayer. The episode was written and directed by series creator Joss Whedon and originally aired on The WB in the United States on February 27, 2001. In the series, Buffy Summers is a teenager chosen by mystical forces and endowed with superhuman powers to defeat vampires, demons, and other evils in the fictional town of Sunnydale. She is supported in her struggles by a close circle of friends and family, nicknamed the "Scooby Gang". In "The Body", Buffy is powerless as she comes upon her lifeless mother, who has died of a brain aneurysm.

Although Buffy and her friends deal with death every week, often in very gruesome and fantastic ways, in this episode they are bewildered by the natural death of Joyce Summers, the divorced mother of Buffy and her sister Dawn and occasionally a mother figure to their friends. They struggle to comprehend what the loss means to each of them and the group. Buffy must begin to face her life and her duties as the Slayer without parental support and comfort. The episode was stripped of all music, and disorienting effects were included to convey the sense of displacement and loss associated with the death of a close family member.

"The Body" aired to wide acclaim, and has since been ranked by several critics as one of the greatest television episodes ever broadcast.

== Background ==
Buffy (Sarah Michelle Gellar) is assisted from season one by her close friends, who collectively refer to themselves as the Scooby Gang: Xander Harris (Nicholas Brendon), whose primary strength is his devotion to Buffy, and Willow Rosenberg (Alyson Hannigan), who begins dabbling in witchcraft and grows progressively more powerful. They are mentored by Rupert Giles (Anthony Stewart Head), Buffy's "Watcher", and joined by Xander's girlfriend Anya Jenkins (Emma Caulfield), who was a vengeance demon until her powers were taken away. Anya is often at a loss to know how to communicate with humans, and her speech is frequently abrupt. In the fourth season, Willow became romantically involved with Tara Maclay (Amber Benson), also a witch.

Each season of Buffy the Vampire Slayer (often simplified as Buffy) presents an overall theme episodes tie into. Roz Kaveney identifies family and belonging as the overall theme of the fifth season. Buffy's mother Joyce (Kristine Sutherland) begins experiencing headaches at the beginning of the season, once collapsing and requiring hospitalization. She subsequently has a brain tumor removed. She has been recovering well. In the previous episode, "I Was Made to Love You", she receives flowers from a male suitor, which Buffy finds at the end of that episode. The fifth season also introduces Dawn (Michelle Trachtenberg), Buffy's 14-year-old sister. Each season has a primary antagonist called the Big Bad; in the fifth season this takes the form of a powerful goddess named Glory (Clare Kramer).

== Plot ==
Buffy arrives home and sees flowers sent by Joyce's suitor. She calls out to her mother but hears no answer. Buffy sees Joyce lying lifeless on the sofa, staring at the ceiling.

There is a flashback to a Christmas dinner where Joyce and all the Scoobies are present, having a typical lighthearted conversation. The scene snaps back to a hysterical Buffy in the living room, shaking Joyce and screaming at her. She calls for an ambulance and attempts CPR, but to no avail. As the paramedics arrive, Buffy briefly fantasizes about Joyce reviving and recovering in the hospital, only to return to reality where the paramedics are unable to revive Joyce and pronounce her dead. Giles arrives and Buffy tells him not to move the body, shocking herself by using that word. At school, Buffy pulls Dawn out of class into the hall. Through the windows of the art room, the class watches Buffy tell her that Joyce has died. Dawn collapses, wailing.

Xander and Anya arrive at Willow's dormitory room where Tara tries to help a panicked Willow find a shirt to wear, as Willow does not know how to appear for Buffy and Dawn. Anya asks Xander what she is supposed to do; he cannot answer. Xander expresses his desire to find Glory and exact justice, then complains about Joyce's negligent doctors. Anya asks if they will see the body, then if the body will be cut open, and Willow responds angrily. Anya tearfully says she does not understand how to behave, or why Joyce cannot go back into her own body, unable to understand human death. The group then leaves to visit Buffy, Dawn and Giles at the hospital.

In the waiting room outside the morgue, the doctor tells Buffy that Joyce died of an aneurysm suddenly and painlessly. Dawn goes alone to see Joyce's body. While she is there, one of the bodies, now a vampire, gets up. After noticing Dawn has not come back, Buffy goes to look for her. As Buffy kills the vampire, the sheet falls from Joyce's face. Looking at her mother's body, Dawn asks where she went, as she reaches out to touch her cheek.

== Production and writing ==
My experience with death is that apart from a lot of people hugging at funerals, it seldom brings people together. It actually tears them apart. And I had always learned from TV that death made everybody stronger and better and learn about themselves. And my experience was that an important piece had been taken out of the puzzle ... and there is no glorious payoff.

— Joss Whedon, 2008

From the start of writing the Buffy series, Joss Whedon asserted that it would never have a "very special episode" as in contemporary series Beverly Hills, 90210, The Wonder Years, or Party of Five, where the core cast of characters addresses a single issue (AIDS, drug abuse, or alcoholism, for example) and resolve all the problems at the end. Whedon was not interested in finding a life-affirming lesson for "The Body". Rather, he wanted to capture the isolation and boredom involved in the minutes and hours after finding a loved one has died, what he termed "the black ashes in your mouth numbness of death". He did not intend to resolve any religious or existential questions about the end of life, but wanted to examine the process in which a person becomes a mere body. Whedon's mother, a teacher, also died of a cerebral aneurysm, and he drew on his own experiences, and those of friends and other writers, in constructing the episode. He tried to achieve an "unlovely physicality" in "The Body" to portray the upsetting minutiae involved in attempting to comprehend what is incomprehensible.

Small details became significant: to protect her dignity, Buffy pulls the hem of Joyce's skirt down after it rode up when she attempted CPR; the camera focuses on a breeze through wind chimes while Buffy vomits; to emphasize Buffy's isolation, the scene has no exterior establishing shots of the house.

The opening sequence of "The Body" was also the closing scene of the previous episode, "I Was Made to Love You"; this is the only episode in the series that was first aired without a "Previously on Buffy" lead-in. The Christmas dinner scene was used both to contrast the stark reality of the rest of the episode and to avoid having the credits appear over the beginning scenes where Buffy is trying to revive her mother.

The episode is presented in four acts, each beginning in total silence and with a close-up shot of Joyce's pale, staring face. Shooting the first act was difficult for Gellar (Buffy). Whedon shot the scene where she finds her mother as one long take, showing her move through the house and calling the paramedics, about seven times. The rest of the scenes in the act were shot in sequence. At the end, Giles arrives and also attempts to revive Joyce, but Buffy blurts, "We're not supposed to move the body!" Both Gellar and Trachtenberg (Dawn) were raised by single women, and Gellar later spoke about the experience of acting something that was very real and close to her, stating, "you try to separate it as best you can and at the same time it adds that extra layer". As soon as the scene was finished with Gellar "at a fever pitch", they restarted it where she comes in the door happily, which Whedon regretted for the emotional range Gellar was required to endure.

Kristine Sutherland (Joyce) was informed during the third season that her character would be killed off, which she accepted because she intended to spend time in Europe. She is absent from most of the fourth season because she was traveling. She reported that the atmosphere on the set of "The Body" was strange and tense because she had been a regular character throughout the series and she was suddenly playing a corpse. She found the part difficult to play, not only for the stillness, but getting into the make-up, and lying on the morgue table with other bodies.

The most difficult scene for Whedon to film was Willow panicking in her dormitory room. Her obsession about what to wear to visit Buffy was inspired by Whedon's own experiences when he was at a loss for what tie to wear for a friend's funeral. He praised Alyson Hannigan's acting, saying that she was able to be consistently emotional in every take and make him and the crew cry every time. Whedon acknowledged his difficulty speaking on the DVD commentary while watching Hannigan in the scene.

Whedon's rejection of the "very special episode" format impelled him to address the physicality of Willow and Tara's relationship within "The Body". Before this episode, they had held hands and danced on screen, but they had not kissed. A genre of television specials dealing with female homosexuality developed as the "lesbian kiss episode" in the 1990s, where a female character kissed another female but no relationship is further explored. Whedon set out to acknowledge Willow's and Tara's affection without making it the primary focus of the show. For attempting this, he received resistance from the airing network, the WB. Whedon informed them that the kiss between Willow and Tara was "not negotiable". According to Whedon, the conversation about the kiss was approached by the network executives, who were concerned with the number of gay relationships on the network. Whedon countered that the kiss was "true to character" and said he would quit the show if the network forbade it. It was the only time during the series he threatened to do so.

When Willow and Tara first met in the fourth season, the writers did not intend the relationship to be romantic but the actors had such chemistry that, two episodes later, Whedon and the writing team took Alyson Hannigan and Amber Benson aside to inform them where it would go. For the rest of the season, the sexual relationship between Willow and Tara was represented metaphorically by witchcraft, and none of the WB executives realized it. In the end, Whedon praised the way the WB handled the display of affection in "The Body", saying "They raised an eyebrow, but they've been great. I give the WB props when it came to the [characters' first] kiss. What I want to show is real affection, and 'The Body' turned out to be the perfect place to put it in. To the network's credit, they not only aired it, but they did not advertise it. I thought that was pretty classy." Stephen Tropiano in Prime Time Closet: A History of Gays and Lesbians on TV writes that this approach was "truly groundbreaking"; no long speech, no huge discovery: "Like Willow, we're made to feel as if her love for Tara is the most natural thing in the world". Tropiano calls it "A simple kiss. A quiet, simple moment. Two lovers kissing. Just like lovers do." Shortly before the end of the scene, while Xander is talking, Willow can be seen silently mouthing "I love you" to Tara.

Audiences reacted more emotionally than Whedon expected to Emma Caulfield's performance. Anya's blunt innocence was similar to a plot twist, as viewers did not expect the depth of sensitivity that she portrayed in her monologue, which Whedon considers "the heart of the experience" and critic Noel Murray reiterates as the "whole point of the episode in bolded, capital letters". Xander's punching the wall and hurting his hand served to give the four in this scene something to concentrate on, to redirect their helplessness, which was another facet of the physicality of dealing with the crisis. Whedon used another long tracking shot from Joyce's face in the morgue following the doctor down the hall to speak with Buffy and the Scoobies to cement the reality of their being so close in proximity, as opposed to cutting shots to give the possibility that it was part of another set located somewhere else. The vampire that attacks Dawn in the morgue was a touch many viewers took to be out of place for the episode. This scene contrasts the more fantasy-related deaths common in the series with Joyce's realistic death. Furthermore, similar to Xander's parking ticket and the sounds of life outside Buffy's house, in Sunnydale vampires are a normal experience, and it was intended to show that life for Buffy continues.

== Themes ==
=== Grief ===
But I don't understand! I don't understand how this all happens. How we go through this. I knew her, and then she's—there's just a body, and I don't understand why she just can't get back in it and not be dead ... anymore! It's stupid! It's mortal and stupid! And ... and Xander's crying and not talking, and ... and I was having fruit punch, and I thought, well, Joyce will never have any more fruit punch, ever, and she'll never have eggs, or yawn, or brush her hair, not ever, and no one will explain to me why!

— Anya, "The Body"

In Nikki Stafford's analysis, the reactions of Buffy, Dawn, Xander, Willow, Anya, and Tara represent stages of Elisabeth Kübler-Ross' five stages of grief in different parts. Joss Whedon stated on the DVD commentary how surprised he was at the response from viewers who wrote to say that the episode allowed them to accept the death of a close family member, even if they had not acknowledged it for months or years. Joyce's death was the first by natural causes in the series.

In The Psychology of Joss Whedon, two academic psychologists identify the source of Buffy's strength as her mother, paired with Giles' mentorship. Joyce did not know all along that Buffy was a Slayer and had difficulty accepting what her daughter was called to do. She was nonetheless always attentive and available when Buffy's confidence was shaken, and both Joyce's and Giles' devotion to her "gave her the self-assurance to wield her power to its full potential". Joyce served as a parent figure to all of Buffy's friends, whose home lives were often unstable or unloving, thus making her death more poignant to all of them. Willow mentions her parents several times throughout the series, but her father is never seen. Her mother is portrayed only once in "Gingerbread", at first as an academic so preoccupied with her career that she is unable to communicate with Willow, and then—with Joyce—under the spell of a demon and in the throes of moral panic, attempting to burn her own daughter at the stake for being involved in witchcraft. Xander's parents are described by him and those who have been to his house as alcoholic and verbally abusive. Even Anya, severely wanting in social graces, has lost someone she admires and trusts. Giles also grieves for the loss of a friend and—in one episode when the adults fall under a spell making them retreat into an adolescent state—a lover. Lorna Jowett in Sex and the Slayer writes that Joyce represents stability and normality. For the Scoobies, her death destroys the illusion that normal life is trouble-free; it is just as challenging as encountering supernatural forces.

Finding her mother's body, Buffy at first denies what she sees, to the point of imagining alternate realities. Whedon stated that these mini dream sequences were like documentaries; people who find their loved ones dead are desperate to imagine a different, better outcome, and they create fantasies that cause much more pain when they are forced to return to the harshness of reality. Later in the hospital, Buffy imagines what she might have been able to do to save Joyce, although the doctor tells her there was nothing to be done. Willow and Xander express anger and helplessness. Anya, new to mortality and human connections, is childlike in her innocence and questions. Xander's anger and Anya's confusion allow them to be mothered somewhat by Willow, who needs to take care of someone. Dawn is deeply in denial, unable to understand that the woman she thought she had known all her life was gone. Tara, who has gone through the ordeal before, represents the acceptance phase, soothing and helping the others to work through what they are experiencing. Buffy toward the end also begins to see acceptance when she tells Dawn that the body in the morgue is not their mother; Joyce is gone.

The episode also emphasizes another theme of the season: Buffy's response to forces that she cannot fight. Throughout the season she encounters the much more powerful goddess Glory, but Joyce's death leaves her feeling the most helpless. In Joyce's death there is no evil force to combat; she simply dies, and Buffy, with all her power, is ill-equipped to grasp the enormity of her situation. In her shock, Buffy retreats to a childlike state of confusion, calling to her mother when she does not answer: "Mom? ... Mom? ... Mommy?" Emma Caulfield was also given the direction for her voice to rise to a childlike pitch at the end of her speech to give the same effect. According to Buffy scholar Rhonda Wilcox, the themes of maturation and facing adult responsibilities begin with the departure of Buffy's boyfriend Riley Finn six episodes before, and crystallize in the preceding episode in which Buffy realizes she does not need a boyfriend to be fulfilled. At the end of that episode she is confronted with Joyce's death, which is fully explored in "The Body". Facing responsibilities became the major theme of the sixth season. One critic writes, "Drastic as it was, killing off Joyce was the logical way to bring Buffy and Dawn closer together, sever Buffy's last ties to girlhood and emphasize Buffy's inability to accept the limits of her power, a recurring theme this season."

=== Reality ===
Whedon uses several disorienting effects to heighten the reality of the situations in the episode to the point that they seem surreal. The long opening shot of Buffy coming home and finding Joyce was filmed with one hand-held camera in constant movement as she walks through the house to the phone and back to her mother again. The buttons on Buffy's phone are abnormally large, an effect that Whedon added because he experienced it when his mother died. Buffy is so bewildered by the paramedic telling her that Joyce is dead that she can only focus on his mouth in an attempt to understand what he is saying. The camera uses her perspective and only the bottom part of the paramedic's face is in view. Instead of a normal "over-the-shoulder" view, Buffy is shot at the same height as the paramedic's shoulder, barely squeezed into the frame as if to portray her, according to Whedon, as trapped by reality. Kristine Sutherland stated that the script was "amazing", specifically at capturing the detachment: "It's not something you can process. I mean mortality is just not part of your vocabulary when you're that age."

In the hospital, as Buffy listens to the doctor confirm how Joyce died, the doctor says something, but the words "I have to lie to you to make you feel better" are spoken discordantly, as though, according to cinema scholar Katy Stevens, Buffy "constructs what she believes to be an unmentionable truth—her culpability in her mother's death". In the same scene, Dawn is shot with a hand-held camera that drifts, giving her a slightly unreal moment as she struggles to believe, unlike what Buffy already knows, that her mother's body is down the hall on a steel table. The scene with Buffy and Tara sitting in the waiting room was noted by Rhonda Wilcox for its reality in showing Gellar as ragged and distinctly unglamorous, particularly because she had been presented in a specific way to attract male viewers and was a spokeswoman for Maybelline while Buffy aired. Buffy sits with circles under her eyes, unflattering hair, and slumped posture next to Tara, who had been criticized for being too heavy, despite her body type being more typical of women her age.

Small details in sounds are made significant in this scene as Buffy, after being told that her mother is dead, vomits on the floor and stands at her back door where life in her neighborhood carries on.

Foremost of the disorienting effects, to critics and scholars, is Whedon's use of sound and silence. While Buffy performs CPR, she cracks one of Joyce's ribs with a startling snap. After Buffy vomits on the floor, she stands in the back doorway listening to life carrying on: children playing, someone practicing a trumpet, and birds singing. Long pauses between dialogue create gaps that turn awkward as the characters try to think of what to say, made especially notable in a series famous for its rapid banter. The transition between the Christmas dinner scene and the living room scene is abrupt, and the sound of Buffy and Joyce shouting because they dropped a pie on the floor carries over into the silence of Joyce's lifeless face and Buffy standing alone in the living room. This effect is also used when shifting between Buffy's alternate version of her mother being "good as new" in the hospital and the paramedics trying to revive her. In the car on the way to Willow's dormitory, Anya is shot by a camera mounted on the front bumper, separated from the audience by the windshield. Xander, driving, faces the other way; neither of them speak and only the sound of the car can be heard. Joyce Millman at Salon.com writes of the sound issues, "The effect was almost Bergmanesque in its starkness. The spooky stillness and the long, spacey pauses in conversation as characters struggled to articulate their feelings exaggerated the sense of time elongating and standing still."

Katy Stevens notes that the dialogue in "The Body" was recorded with microphones very close to the actors, making variations in their voices—cracks, rises, and whispers—more prominent to the audience, to close the distance between the actors and the viewer. Conversely, the scene in which Dawn is told of Joyce's death was shot through a large classroom window, muffling Dawn's emotional reaction, to isolate Buffy and Dawn from the class and the audience. Several moments of silence follow this scene. Whedon shot the conversation up close several times, filming over-the-shoulder and reaction shots, but eventually went with a more distanced point of view. Michelle Trachtenberg later said of this effect, "obviously you know in the end result there was no sound and I thought that was actually one of the most brilliant ideas [he's] ever had because it allows everyone to sort of attach their own emotional plug into whatever might have happened in your life. I think it allowed the audience to really connect with Dawn for the first time."

Presenting the episode without any non-diegetic music was Whedon's way of denying the audience any comfort, forcing them to discern their own meanings from the characters' actions and words. As two musicologists write about this absence, "Without music's acoustic balm, all our empathetic attention is on the characters and their state of bewilderment ... Music would provide a conceptualization and a catharsis ... but a catharsis at this point would in some measure trivialize the loss." Television critic Gareth McLean writes that this decision is "a move that makes it more courageous than, for instance, ER. There were no soaring strings or plaintive piano to trigger an emotional response. Instead the soundtrack took in the ambient noises of wind chimes, doors squeaking, footsteps on carpets. Conversations were stilted and awkward, but the spaces in between always mattered."

== Reception ==
Any sneerer of Buffy in particular or genre work should simply be sat down in front of a television and told to shut up for three-quarters of an hour while they are shown "The Body"; their awestruck silence afterwards may be taken as recantation or apology.

— Ian Shuttleworth, 2004

Critics praised the episode, and have continued to count it as one of the finest episodes of television ever broadcast. David Bianculli in the New York Daily News commends the acting abilities of Sarah Michelle Gellar, Michelle Trachtenberg, Alyson Hannigan, and Amber Benson. "The Body", according to Bianculli is "Emmy-worthy ... It also will haunt you—but not in the normal way associated with this still-evolving, still-achieving series." Television critic Alesia Redding and editor Joe Vince of the South Bend Tribune write, "I was riveted by this show ... This isn't just one of the best Buffy episodes of all time. It's one of the best episodes of TV of all time." Redding adds, "If you watch this incredible episode and don't recognize it as great TV, you're hopeless ... A 'fantasy' show delivers the most stark and realistic take on death I've ever seen, deftly depicting how a loved one who dies suddenly becomes 'the body'."

Gareth McLean in The Guardian rejects the notion that Buffy is similar to other "schmaltzy American teen show(s)" like Dawson's Creek: "This episode was a brave, honest and wrenching portrayal of death and loss. The way this was handled by Joss Whedon ... was ingenious. Time slowed down and the feeling of numbness was palpable as Buffy and her gang tried to come to terms with Joyce's death." McLean especially appreciated the small details of Buffy protecting Joyce's dignity and the confusion shown by the characters. He concludes, "Joyce may be dead but long live Buffy the Vampire Slayer." Joe Gross in the Austin American-Statesman calls the episode "devastatingly calm" and states that "the entire cast and crew should have received some sort of Emmy for 'The Body'".

At Salon.com, Joyce Millman writes, "there hasn't been a finer hour of drama on TV this year than ... 'The Body' ... You have to hand it to the writers; Joyce's demise came as a complete surprise. In that instant, Buffy's childhood officially ends. Even if Buffy gets stiffed in every other Emmy category this year, 'The Body' should convince the nominating committee that Gellar is for real ... I can't remember the last time I saw a more wrenching portrayal of the shock of loss." Andrew Gilstrap at PopMatters declares it "possibly the finest hour of television I've seen, bar none ... It is an incredibly moving episode, one that finally admits that you don't walk away from death unscathed. It also shows that, for all the group's slaying experience, they really weren't prepared for death when it stole a loved one." Gilstrap went on to say the series did not again address death and grief of this magnitude until, in another shocking turn of events, Tara dies of a stray gunshot in the sixth season. Jerry McCormick in The San Diego Union-Tribune agrees, rating Joyce's death as having the same emotional impact as Tara's in "Seeing Red", both of which he listed as the saddest in the series.

Kira Schlechter in The Patriot-News declares "The Body" "one of the finest episodes of any series ever", stating that the silence and novel cinematography are "remarkable and the writing is brilliant". Buffy and Dawn's conversation at her school, Schlechter says, is "positively wrenching". When the series ended in 2003, Amy Antangelo in the Boston Herald and Siona LaFrance of the New Orleans Times-Picayune both rated the best Buffy episodes giving "The Body" equal billing at the top with "Hush" and "Once More, with Feeling", LaFrance designating the episode an "instant classic". Jonathan Last in The Weekly Standard lists "The Body" eighth out of the ten best Buffy episodes, writing that it is "the series' most difficult episode because it's real—and not real in the way ER or The Practice or Law & Order, all hyper-versions of reality, are real. At some point, most of us will experience a day like Buffy has in 'The Body' and we sense that the writers have gotten nearly every detail of that day—right down to the absence of a musical score—right." In the A.V. Club, Noel Murray also finds small details compelling, such as the camera's focus on the paper towel Buffy uses to cover the vomit on the carpet. He does, however, write that some of the shots "come off a little gimmicky, but the ones that work are so effective that it seems petty to complain that Whedon overdoes it at times. (Besides, different moments are likely to move different people.)"

In addition to praising Gellar's acting, Buffy scholar Ian Shuttleworth comments on the cast and the nuanced numbness and confusion of the characters, paired with the moments of silence in the episode: "It is simply one of the finest pieces of television drama, and the single finest depiction of bereavement in any medium, that I have ever seen." Nikki Stafford, author of Bite Me! The Unofficial Guide to Buffy the Vampire Slayer, calls "The Body" "an absolute masterpiece", explaining that it is "hands down the single most terrifying, heart-breaking, painful, and amazing hour of television I have ever seen". She praises the entire cast equally, but highlights Gellar, Alyson Hannigan, and Emma Caulfield. Stafford also praised Kristine Sutherland—as did Whedon—for having to lie motionless with her eyes open for hours upon hours over eight days of filming.

In 2015, Gavin Hetherington of SpoilerTV looked back at the episode fourteen years later. Upon reviewing the episode, he called it "one of the best hours of television" he had ever seen and went on to say "I don't think any other supernatural show has ever had a more beautiful episode than The Body".

When the episode was originally broadcast in the United States on the WB network on February 27, 2001, it received a Nielsen rating of 3.5 and a share of 5, and was watched by 6 million viewers. The episode placed fifth in its timeslot, and 82nd among broadcast television for the week of February 26 – March 4, 2001. It was the most watched program on the WB that night, and the second most watched program that week, trailing 7th Heaven. This was a slight increase from a 3.4 rating and 87th position achieved by the previous episode. The episode was released on DVD on October 28, 2002 in Region 2, and December 9, 2003 in Region 1. Although the episode received positive reviews, it was not nominated for any Emmy awards. Rhonda Wilcox attributes this to the Emmys being a "bastion of conservative popular taste", automatically rejecting television shows in the fantasy/science fiction genres. The script was nominated for a Nebula Award, given for excellence in science fiction/fantasy writing.

== Bibliography ==
- Attinello, Paul; Halfyard, Janet; Knights, Vanessa (eds.) (2010). Music, Sound, and Silence in Buffy the Vampire Slayer, Ashgate Publishing, Ltd. ISBN 978-0-7546-6042-2
- Davidson, Joy (ed.) (2007). The Psychology of Joss Whedon: An Unauthorized Exploration of Buffy, Angel, and Firefly, Benbella Books. ISBN 978-1-933771-25-0
- Jowett, Lorna (2005). Sex and the Slayer: A Gender Studies Primer for the Buffy Fan, Wesleyan University Press. ISBN 978-0-8195-6758-1
- Kaveney, Roz (ed.) (2004). Reading the Vampire Slayer: The New, Updated, Unofficial Guide to Buffy and Angel, Tauris Parke Paperbacks. ISBN 1-4175-2192-9
- Ruditis, Paul (2004). Buffy the Vampire Slayer: The Watcher's Guide, Volume 3, Simon & Schuster. ISBN 0-689-86984-3
- Stafford, Nikki (2007). Bite Me! The Unofficial Guide to Buffy the Vampire Slayer, ECW Press. ISBN 978-1-55022-807-6
- Stevenson, Gregory (2004). Televised Morality; The Case of Buffy the Vampire Slayer, Hamilton Books. ISBN 0-7618-2833-8
- Tropiano, Stephen (2002). Prime Time Closet: A History of Gays and Lesbians on TV, Applause Theater and Cinema Books. ISBN 1-55783-557-8
- Wilcox, Rhonda (2005). Why Buffy Matters: The Art of Buffy the Vampire Slayer, I. B. Tauris. ISBN 1-84511-029-3
