= Amends =

- Buffy the Vampire Slayer episode
- Episode no.: Season 3 Episode 10
- Directed by: Joss Whedon
- Written by: Joss Whedon
- Production code: 3ABB10
- Original air date: December 15, 1998

Guest appearances
- Kristine Sutherland as Joyce Summers; Saverio Guerra as Willy the Snitch; Shane Barach as Daniel; Edward Edwards as Travis; Cornelia Hayes O'Herlihy as Margaret; Eliza Dushku as Faith Lehane; Robia LaMorte as The First/Jenny Calendar; Mark Kriski as Weatherman; Tom Michael Bailey Smith as Tree Seller Guy

Episode chronology
← Previous "The Wish"	Next → "Gingerbread"
- Buffy the Vampire Slayer season 3

"Amends" is episode ten of season three of the television show Buffy the Vampire Slayer. It was written and directed by series creator Joss Whedon. Advertised as a Christmas episode, it was first broadcast on The WB on December 15, 1998.

Angel is so remorseful over his past and more recent deeds, and is so tormented by ghosts, that he wishes to make amends, even if it means dying. Willow makes (seductive) amends to Oz, and they get back together; Buffy makes amends to Faith for their mutual antagonism by inviting her to Christmas Eve dinner.

== Plot ==
It is Christmas in Sunnydale and Angel is haunted with dreams of the people he murdered over the years as Angelus. Visions of his past victims, including Jenny Calendar, appear to him. When Buffy starts getting dragged into his memory-nightmares, experiencing Angel's dreams also, they realize something unnatural is happening. Angel's visions develop and try to get him to kill Buffy, saying that he will be released from the pain if he does so. Angel cannot bring himself to do this, so instead he opts to kill himself by standing on a hill and waiting for the sun to come up.

Buffy and Giles figure out that the First Evil has been driving Angel insane. Buffy finds the Bringers of Death and pummels them. After the First appears to her, informing her that she cannot possibly fight it, and that Angel is about to be destroyed by the dawn's light, she runs to his mansion to stop him. Buffy, who invited Faith to Christmas Eve dinner and then asked her to guard Joyce, consults Giles and then realizes she knows where to find the Bringers in their underground lair.

Meanwhile, Oz tells Willow that he is willing to give their relationship another chance, while Cordelia is not as forgiving and resumes her previously hostile ways towards the Scooby gang. Oz goes to Willow's house to watch videos, only to find her dressed seductively and playing Barry White's music, intending to sleep with him. Oz appreciates the gesture, but explains to Willow that he wants their first time to be special and that she has nothing to prove.

Buffy finds Angel atop the hill behind the mansion, awaiting sunrise. The heatwave from which Sunnydale has been suffering abruptly ends and the first flakes of snow start to fall, which Angel takes as a sign he was brought back for a purpose. With the weather report saying the sun should not be expected to be seen at all that day, Buffy and Angel take a walk through the town.

== Interpretation ==
=== Humans' sinful nature ===
According to Susannah Clements, the episode "provides a rich perceptive exploration of humanity's sinful nature. Humans are not only "not strong enough to fight evil in general", but are also not able to "fight their own sinful nature". The good that can be done is not enough and it can not be done all the time. The First Evil sends Angel back from hell to kill Buffy. As Angel has a soul he is struggling with his evil nature. The First Evil is something that Buffy isn't able to fight off or kill. Angel is convinced by the First Evil, that he has to either kill Buffy or himself. There is no way for humans to fight this purest form of evil. Angel realizes that, even though Buffy tries to save him. She tells him that there is a weakness in everyone, but everyone has "the power to do real good" and to "make amends". Angel replies, that it is not the demon in him that needs to be killed, but the man. The evil is too strong and it can not be fought alone. So within the series "salvation comes without of humanity", the sun in which Angel tries to kill himself, can not be seen for the whole day. Angel is saved.

=== Snow ===
When Angel tried to kill himself awaiting the sunrise, it suddenly snows and the sun can not be seen there. When Joss Whedon was asked if it was God who made it snow, he answered that he is an atheist, but that he can also not ignore "the idea of a Christmas miracle". He says that the Christian mythology is fascinating for him and also finds its way into his stories. Redemption, hope, and purpose are important to him. He doesn't mind "a strictly Christian interpretation being placed on this episode" by everyone believing in it. He just hopes it is not limited to it.

== Continuity ==
Oz asks Willow, "You ever have that dream where you're in a play, and it's the middle of the play and you really don't know your lines, and you kinda don't know the plot?" This will happen to Willow in "Restless."

== Reception ==
Vox ranked it at #100 on their "Every Episode Ranked From Worst to Best" list (to mark the 20th anniversary of the show), writing, "Angel-centric episodes tend toward melodrama — something it took Angel the series a little while to figure out how to deal with — and 'Amends,' with its tearful clifftop climax, definitely leans toward the overwrought end of the spectrum. But as a way of dealing with the trauma of season two, it’s cathartic, and it remains one of the most effective uses of the First Evil, way before it became a major Big Bad."

Myles McNutt writes that it "isn’t really an episode about Angel, but rather about how everyone else views Angel... 'Amends' is an episode which isn't important narratively so much as it is important emotionally... Boreanaz is really tremendous as he captures the character's inner pain without chewing the scenery in the process."

A reviewer for the BBC praised the writing, acting, and directing of Buffy's rescue of Angel. "The idea that the arrival of snow would somehow prevent the sun rising is somewhat odd, but - hey! – this is Sunnydale, right?"
