= Anne (Buffy the Vampire Slayer) =

- Buffy the Vampire Slayer episode
- Episode no.: Season 3 Episode 1
- Directed by: Joss Whedon
- Written by: Joss Whedon
- Production code: 3ABB01
- Original air date: September 29, 1998

Guest appearances
- Kristine Sutherland as Joyce Summers; Julia Lee as Lily; Carlos Jacott as Ken; Mary-Pat Green as Blood Bank Doctor; Chad Todhunter as Rickie; Larry Bagby as Larry Blaisdell; James Lurie as Mr. Miller; Michael Leopard as Roughneck; Harley Zumbrum as Demon Guard; Barbara Pilavin as Old Woman; Harrison Young as Old Man; Alex Toma as Aaron; Dell Yount as Truck Guy

Episode chronology
← Previous "Becoming"	Next → "Dead Man's Party"
- Buffy the Vampire Slayer season 3

"Anne" is the third season premiere of the drama television series Buffy the Vampire Slayer. It was written and directed by series creator Joss Whedon, and first broadcast on The WB on September 29, 1998.

The episode marks a significant emotional journey for Buffy as she has cast off her slayer identity along with her friends in Sunnydale. In the episode, Buffy - living a secluded life in a different city from her previous life - helps some unknown strangers find their lost loved ones. Meanwhile, Buffy has to decide whether she is ready to find herself again. This episode forms part of a larger study of personal and alternate identities which characterises all seven seasons of the show.

== Plot ==
Due to her expulsion from school, the deaths of her lover Angel and friend and fellow Slayer Kendra Young, being accused of murder in the latter's death, and being kicked out by her mother, Joyce, Buffy has left Sunnydale and moved to Los Angeles where she works as a diner waitress under her middle name, "Anne". In the diner, Buffy serves Lily and Rickie, a young couple living on the streets, who have just gotten a complementary set of distinctive tattoos. As Buffy walks the street a homeless woman is muttering she is "no one." Later that evening, Lily approaches Buffy and reveals that she remembers her from Sunnydale and a time when Lily was known as "Chanterelle". As they talk, a man bumps through and mutters that he is no one as he walks out into traffic and is nearly hit by a car, saved only by Buffy's quick response. Buffy encounters a man named Ken, who comments on her "lost" state and offers to befriend her.

The next day Lily tells Buffy that Rickie has disappeared. Buffy reluctantly agrees to help find him. In her search, she finds the corpse of an elderly homeless man with Rickie's tattoo. Buffy reports her findings to Lily, who does not believe that the body could be Rickie's. On the street Lily meets Ken, who claims to know Rickie, so she eagerly goes with him. Buffy interrogates a blood bank worker who has been acting suspiciously, and learns that the woman has been giving Ken the names of healthy homeless people who come in to donate blood.

Back in Sunnydale, Willow, Xander and Oz struggle to cover for Buffy in her Slayer duties, and reluctantly resort to using Cordelia as bait in their next stakeout mission. After returning from an unsuccessful lead on Buffy's location in Oakland, Giles visits Joyce, who is now suffering from agoraphobia after learning of Buffy's Slayer life. Joyce blames Giles for taking her daughter away from her.

Meanwhile, Ken has prepared a hesitant Lily for a "cleansing", which entails stepping into a bath of black oil in the floor. At the door, Buffy attempts to pass herself off as a sinner wanting a new chance, but ends up kicking her way into the building in time to see Lily dragged into the pool. Buffy and Ken wrestle and they both fall in, coming out below in a huge factory. Ken's human mask falls off, revealing him to be a demon. Buffy and Lily are now amongst many other slave laborers of varying ages. Ken tells Buffy and Lily that they are in a hell dimension where time passes very quickly: a hundred years there equals only one day in Los Angeles. Since he only picks people who no one will miss, they will have worked themselves to a used-up death of old age without anyone noticing their absence. He tells Lily that Rickie remembered her, even after he had forgotten his own name. Lily resigns herself to ending up in hell, and accepts her fate passively.

Ken lines the captives up and each one is asked, "Who are you?" and then bludgeoned unless they deny their existence. When it is Buffy's turn, she says her name with pride and a battle ensues until Ken threatens Lily at knifepoint. Ken delivers a speech, but Lily pushes him off the ledge onto a concrete floor. Lily then leads the captives back up through the pool as Buffy dispatches Ken. Once all of the humans are out of the demonic dimension, the pool gateway closes.

Back in her apartment, Buffy packs her bag, ready to return to Sunnydale. She gives Lily her "Anne" identity. On her arrival back at the family home, Buffy is embraced by her relieved mother.

== Themes ==
Essayist Emily (last name not given) of the site InsectReflection.com analyzes the issues of self-blame and living in hell ("Anne even works in a diner called 'Helen's Kitchen'"), shows how Willow is stepping up to be a natural leader (while Cordelia, heretofore clique leader, flounders a bit), and discusses Lily through a queer reading.

The website Pop Matters examines Lily (later calling herself Anne Steele):

Anne is an intriguing character because, although she is tangentially touched by the supernatural occurrences that are regular events on both programs, she maintains her identity as a "regular" individual throughout. This ability to live a normal life (despite her first-hand knowledge of the existence of vampires, demons, and zombies) demonstrates her strength of character and also allows the writers to explore the elements of an important psychological concept outside the supernatural realm that permeates the series, the concept of identity formation. Naturally, all of the characters on both programs have strong identities that form as the shows progress, but Anne is different in that, while many of the other characters develop identities that are very much determined by their experiences with the supernatural, Anne’s identity develops outside the supernatural realm (the way the identities of those young people watching the show develop).

Roger Pocock, regarding Joyce as "a monster of a mother," argues, "Buffy has a wonderful support network she can turn to, and the episode could have ended much more credibly with Buffy turning up at the door of Giles or Willow. Either could have provided her with a roof over her head, and a fresh start among friends. Instead, she goes back to the woman who not so long ago rejected her daughter when she confided in her that she was in physical danger from the man whom Joyce had invited into their home ["Ted"]; she goes back to the woman who couldn’t deal with not being the protector of her daughter, and couldn’t deal with the truth of her daughter’s real life, having turned a blind eye to the blood on her clothes because she didn’t want to acknowledge what was happening; she goes back to the woman who told her never to return."

== Continuity ==
Julia Lee, who plays Chanterelle/Lily/Anne, first showed up as a vampire wanna-be in "Lie to Me" and later appears, still using the name Anne, in Angel in the episodes "The Thin Dead Line," "Blood Money," and "Not Fade Away."

Both Oz and Larry Bagby (who trumpets, "If we can focus, keep disciplined, and not have quite so many mysterious deaths, Sunnydale is gonna rule!") appear to be repeating their senior year of high school.

Cordelia, anxious about seeing Xander again after the summer, snipes that "he probably met up with some hot little Inca Mummy Girl."

The episode shows the working of a demon dimension with a variable space-time characteristic. This will feature in many future episodes, chiefly when Angel reappears from a hell dimension, but also in his own spin-off, Angel.

== Reception ==
Vox ranked it at #56 on their "Every Episode Ranked From Worst to Best" list, calling it "mostly a functional season premiere that cleans up some of the horror of season two," but also "a smooth, well-oiled machine: The story beats are well-balanced, the tone is assured, and the central cast knows exactly how to do what it’s doing."

Noel Murray of The A.V. Club describes "Anne" as "a very clever meditation on adolescent identity". Mike Loschiavo writes that "while we’re back with a serious episode, Whedon takes a few minutes to remind me that we are here to have fun. Then he kicks us in the gut with his focus on homelessness. Whedon is a master when it comes to demonizing social plights and I mean that literally."

Entertainment Weekly calls it an "anemic" episode, lacking "the show's usual tongue-in-cheek spark."

The scene in which Anne asserts her identity as Buffy was frequently used as a promotional clip for reruns of the series on the FX channel.
