= Joyce Summers =

- Buffy the Vampire Slayer character
- First appearance: "Welcome to the Hellmouth" (1997)
- Last appearance: "Buffy the Vampire Slayer Season Ten" (2014)
- Created by: Joss Whedon
- Portrayed by: Kristine Sutherland; Candy Clark (non-canon)

In-universe information
- Affiliation: Scooby Gang
- Family: Arlene (sister)
- Spouse: Hank Summers (divorced)
- Children: Buffy Summers; Dawn Summers
- Classification: Human

Joyce Summers is a fictional character in the action-horror television series Buffy the Vampire Slayer (1997–2003). Played by Kristine Sutherland, Joyce is the mother of the main character, Buffy Summers, and appears in 58 of the 144 episodes.

The premise of the series is that Buffy is the latest Slayer, a young woman endowed by mystical forces with superhuman powers to fight and defeat vampires, demons, and other evil forces in the fictional town of Sunnydale. Like every Slayer before her, she was chosen and informed of her destiny when she was 15 years old. Her mother is unaware of her daughter's powers and responsibilities until Buffy is forced to tell her at the end of the second season of the television series. Although Joyce is shocked at this revelation, she recovers quickly and remains a source of stability for Buffy and Buffy's small circle of friends who assist her, dubbed the Scooby Gang. Eventually Joyce is able to take Buffy's dangerous demon-fighting in stride and even become proud and respectful of her daughter's abilities. Her natural death from an illness in the fifth season forces Buffy to face becoming an adult.

== Creation and casting ==
The television series Buffy the Vampire Slayer (often simplified as Buffy) was created by Joss Whedon, who originally used the concept of a teenage girl who is given superhuman powers to fight evil, in a screenplay that became a film in 1992. Unhappy with the outcome of the film, Whedon created the series, which picks up shortly after the events of the film and is loosely based on its ending. At the end of the film, which was set in Los Angeles, Buffy fights and defeats a gang of vampires in her school's gymnasium. At the start of the television series Buffy and her mother Joyce, who has divorced Buffy's father, move to a new town named Sunnydale where Buffy is to attend Sunnydale High School, which, unknown to her, is situated on a portal to hell, called a Hellmouth. The series explains that she has relocated from Los Angeles after burning down the gymnasium, marking her as a trouble-making student and a worrisome daughter. The series regularly employs the elements of dark fantasy and horror to represent the real problems regularly encountered by adolescents, with many situations also reflecting adult fears and anxieties.

Buffy's parents are barely seen in the film, but her mother Joyce (Kristine Sutherland) plays a prominent role in the series. Sutherland, a fantasy fiction fan who dislikes the horror genre, had recently moved to Hollywood from New York City in 1996 and was not actively looking for acting jobs when her agent called her with the opportunity to play Joyce. Sutherland auditioned the same day as David Boreanaz, Buffy's romantic interest Angel, and was impressed with how naturally she felt at ease with the material in the readings with the writers and casting agents. Sutherland said in an interview that she felt she identified strongly with adolescents. Her empathy for them made her protective not only of the actors, but of their characters as well. A storyline with the premise that Joyce be possessed as the mother from hell was one of Sutherland's favorite possible scripts, but it was cut.

== Progression ==
=== Seasons 1 and 2 ===
Buffy is introduced to her new school as a student who is both emotionally and academically troubled. With the move to Sunnydale, she believes she is starting fresh, a notion her mother also believes and encourages. As Buffy establishes herself in school in early episodes, Joyce, who is recently divorced, is preoccupied with setting up their home and running an art gallery. Initially unwilling to become involved again with her role as the Slayer, Buffy is nevertheless confronted by the school librarian Giles (Anthony Head), her new Watcher, the mentor and teacher assigned to instruct her how to fight vampires and other demons she is destined to face. Buffy does not tell her mother about this development, and Joyce remains ignorant of Buffy's role as the Slayer and of Giles' influence in her life, something she later resents when he seems to be closer to Buffy in ways Joyce is not.

Joyce's initial role in the series is, according to scholar J. P. Williams, very similar to the Superman character Lois Lane, who is unable to discern the likeness between Clark Kent with his glasses on and Superman with his glasses off. Buffy is frequently referred to as a superhero by authors, and Joyce's initial ignorance of Buffy's abilities and responsibilities creates skepticism among both characters in the series and viewers about Joyce's intelligence and motivations. For example, Joyce sees the extremely attentive Giles merely as a teacher concerned about Buffy as a student who has experienced academic problems in the past.

This willful ignorance of Buffy's vocation has been well-analyzed by Buffy studies scholars. A persistent theme in Buffy is the nearly unbreachable generation gap between adolescents and adults. Throughout the series, adults are either unable or unwilling to see the genuine horrors teenagers face. As Buffy's mother, Joyce is repeatedly confronted with evidence of her daughter's role as the Slayer; Sutherland saw this as a form of denial on Joyce's part. The resulting conflict between Joyce and Buffy is both tragic and humorous. When Buffy skips class or stays out late to attend to her Slayer duties, Joyce is left trying to punish her by restricting her to the house. Joyce responds to the dire situations Buffy must face by placing regular and inconvenient restrictions on her, such as grounding her at a time when Buffy must confront and try to kill the Master (the head of a vampire cult who is attempting to fulfill a prophecy that he will kill the Slayer and open the Hellmouth in Sunnydale), saying sarcastically to Buffy, "I know—if you don't go out it'll be the end of the world", when in fact, it just may be, or telling Buffy that she is free to make her own life choices, when Buffy knows exactly what her destiny is, and that it may include dying young. This duality of language reinforces the generation gap between the characters.

That the way I as Joyce see Buffy as the Slayer is sort of symbolic, when you look at your child and realize they are a totally different person than you are and that they have different gifts and a different calling. It's a separation thing. In this case it's just more extreme and because it isn't just that she's an incredible pianist. It's something that has a moral cause behind it and so it brings dual feelings. 'I'm your mother and I'm older and I'm wiser but yet you're my daughter and you're this really spectacular person who's going places and wrestling with things that are beyond what I'll ever have to do in my lifetime.'

— Kristine Sutherland

Joyce is, according to author Lorna Jowett, a typical "teen-horror parent": loving and supporting, but not really facing or knowing the true extent of reality, therefore ineffective at helping her child. She embodies the expectation that mothers should intuitively understand their children. Buffy confronts her mother's denial in "Becoming", the second-season finale, forcing Joyce to see the reality of what Buffy is and does. As a result of their confrontation, Joyce gives Buffy an ultimatum that she either stay at home or never come back. As Buffy is compelled to thwart the apocalypse, she accepts her mother's decision, leaves the house and, ultimately, Sunnydale. Sutherland read the script for the second-season finale in her car, unable to stop reading until the resolution, where she sat sobbing when it is revealed Buffy leaves. In their heated encounter Buffy says to her mother, "Open your eyes, Mom. What do you think has been going on for the past two years? The fights? The weird occurrences. How many times have you washed blood out of my clothing and you still haven't figured it out?" Joyce responds by trying to restrict Buffy again, then attempting to physically restrain her, at which point Buffy ends Joyce's ideas of parental authority by easily overpowering her and walking out the door.

Despite her difficulty with understanding Buffy, Joyce frequently expresses her love for her daughter and supports her when other adults do not. The love Joyce expresses is interpreted by scholars as an attempt to compensate for having failed to understand intuitively that something was going on with her daughter before the revelation that Buffy is the Slayer. Following that revelation, Joyce makes many attempts to understand what a Slayer does. Many scenes showing Joyce giving love and support to Buffy take place in their home, establishing it as center of motherly devotion, stability, and safety. Shots are usually composed so that the two are not seen in the same frame, or are separated by objects such as tables, or placed in opposite sides of rooms, a visual representation of Joyce's inability to understand her daughter's responsibilities and powers.

=== Seasons 3 and 4 ===
The third season opens with Buffy returning home from Los Angeles at the end of "Anne". Joyce and Buffy are at first very ill at ease with each other during the next episode, "Dead Man's Party", while Buffy starts to understand how difficult Joyce's time has been without her. Sutherland welcomed the change; she felt the relationship between Joyce and Buffy "became so much richer" after Joyce finally knew of and faced Buffy's role as the Slayer. The overt conflict of "Dead Man's Party" has Joyce bringing home a cursed mask that calls zombies to the house while a party is occurring, killing several people. Author Nikki Stafford sees the zombies at the party as symbolism for the utter confusion of dealing with Buffy's return. During the party, Buffy feels so uncomfortable around her family and friends she considers leaving again. Joyce and Buffy's best friend Willow Rosenberg (Alyson Hannigan) both angrily confront Buffy; Joyce admits that she does not know all the answers and that giving Buffy an ultimatum was a mistake. The episode marks Joyce's return as a parent; her recognition of her own shortcomings in the error of pushing Buffy away is a measure of nobility common among Joss Whedon's characters.

Following her realization that Buffy is the Slayer, Joyce begins to express concern for Buffy's well-being and long-term plans. The third season showcases two episodes in which Joyce is a major character. Both of them posit Buffy as a parent figure over Joyce. With "Band Candy" the episode begins with Buffy being petulant and Joyce working with Giles to create a schedule for studying and slaying, but these roles quickly dissolve in the ensuing chaos. In an attempt to offer a sacrifice to a demon, Sunnydale's shadowy mayor intoxicates the adults of the town with drugged chocolate bars, making them devolve into adolescents. Joyce descends into the behavior of a 16-year-old, a prospect Kristine Sutherland found not only fun, but painful as it brought back memories she had not faced in years. Giles is also affected, turning into his adolescent miscreant self, which Joyce finds irresistible (the two have sex on a police car in the middle of downtown Sunnydale). Giles has become Buffy's father figure following her parents' divorce, and Buffy finds Joyce's attraction to Giles disquieting. Joyce had dated before ("Ted") but Buffy, and consequently the audience, do not see Joyce as a sexual character; she is foremost a mother. According to Lorna Jowett, Joyce is rare among the characters on the series: "Joyce is always and only Buffy's mother, never just another person or a member of the team."

The second instance of role-reversal is in the episode "Gingerbread", where again children demonstrate more wisdom than the adults. The episode is noted as highlighting this motif specifically, as the divide between parents and children is exaggerated and symbolized by Joyce's confusion. In an attempt to learn more about her daughter's Slayer duties, Joyce follows Buffy on patrol at night, bringing snacks and saying she wants to observe Buffy work. Joyce finds two dead children in a playground and is deeply disturbed. After Buffy comforts her mother, the Scoobies discover that the children are the manifestation of a demon whose sole purpose is to tear communities apart by sparking moral panics. Joyce, meanwhile, becomes entirely consumed with finding the culprit of the apparent murders. She starts a parents' activist organization named "Mothers Opposed to the Occult" (or "M.O.O." to Buffy's mortification) with Willow's mother, an academic and parenting expert so self-involved that she virtually ignores her daughter. Both Buffy and Willow—whose skills in witchcraft are growing—are seized by M.O.O., who attempt to burn them at the stake. Joyce takes a leadership role, giving a speech to concerned parents about the unnatural evils in the town, citing the "slayers and witches" among other monsters. Her compulsion to become involved in Buffy's dark world, with its disastrous results, represents her feeling of helplessness in relation to Buffy's calling. She is unable to protect or comprehend what Buffy must endure—another expression of teenage-parent alienation.

In the fourth season, as Buffy and Willow attend college, Joyce's role is scaled back considerably. Kristine Sutherland and her family moved to Italy to live, so she starred in only five episodes in the season, including the first one, "The Freshman," when Buffy comes home during her bewildering first week at college to discover that Joyce has filled her room with packing crates from the art gallery. This sign of her mother's life going on without her increases Buffy's disorientation and underscores Joyce's independent life. Consequent to her mother's distance, Buffy must begin to face some of her problems alone, the least of which is cooking Thanksgiving dinner for Giles and the Scooby Gang in "Pangs". Buffy encounters a female psychology professor at college who challenges and frustrates her, but also validates her intellect, something Buffy has not been well known for. Professor Maggie Walsh becomes, for the first part of the season, a substitute mother for Buffy. The last episode of the season,"Restless", explores the dreams of Willow, Xander Harris (Nicholas Brendon), Giles, and Buffy. Joyce appears as a seductress to Xander (in a red silk nightgown), and appears again in Buffy's dream as Buffy wanders the halls of college. Joyce is stuck inside a wall, saying that she is content making lemonade and learning to play mahjong. The enigmatic nature of "Restless" allows analysts to explain the depth of the characters and their relationships, as well as the foreshadowing of events to come in subsequent seasons. Joyce's confinement in a tight space in Buffy's dream indicates that Buffy considers her mother's life to be very limited. The hole in the wall through which Joyce and Buffy speak briefly shows only Joyce's head and shoulders, which, according to Nikki Stafford, is the prevailing image in the fifth-season episode "The Body", an episode which explores Joyce's death and its immediate aftermath.

=== Season 5: Joyce's death ===
As noted by author Roz Kaveney, Joyce becomes central to the fifth season's themes of family and Buffy facing forces she is unable to fight or control. A new character is introduced to the Summers family: Buffy gets a 14-year-old sister named Dawn (Michelle Trachtenberg), who is the mystical embodiment of a "key" which opens portals to all dimensions. Before Dawn's arrival, Joyce had been experiencing loneliness as Buffy's increasing responsibilities took over, at one point remarking that her house gets very quiet without Buffy present. She inadvertently invites the Romanian vampire mystic Count Dracula as a result. Although Dawn is unaware of what she is, Buffy discovers her true identity after becoming suspicious that Dawn is attempting to harm Joyce. After experiencing debilitating headaches, collapsing, and then requiring hospitalization, Joyce learns that she has a brain tumor. A side-effect of the tumor is that Joyce remembers that she had never given birth to Dawn and glimpses her as a bright, beautiful, mystical energy. Buffy later admits the truth and tells Joyce why Dawn is in their lives and that she is protecting her from a powerful hell-god Glory (Clare Kramer).

Despite knowing Dawn's true origins, Joyce still loves her, accepting Dawn as her daughter, and collaborates with Buffy and Giles to protect her. Buffy believes that Dawn was based on her, and they later discover that they share blood, thereby proving that Dawn is truly a member of Joyce's bloodline, whose human body was created from her birth daughter's.

To protect Dawn as well as tend to Joyce after she has brain surgery, Buffy moves out of her dorm and returns to the family home. Riley Finn (Marc Blucas), Buffy's boyfriend for the past year, leaves in the episode "Into the Woods". Following his departure, and in the course of the episode "I Was Made to Love You", Buffy comes to feel that she does not need a boyfriend. Her confidence in this decision is immediately shaken at the end of the episode when she comes home to find her mother's lifeless body on the sofa. Joyce's death is fully explored in "The Body" as the entire cast of characters struggles to understand how the once-vibrant Joyce has become a body in the morgue. Scholar Jes Battis writes that in contrast to the way family members are portrayed throughout the series as absent (Willow's), chaotic (Xander's), or highly disruptive (Anya's), Joyce straddles these extremes. The ease of her success at mothering a violent superhero and a mystical key while appearing to enjoy a normal life is eroded by a brain tumor, and only then do she and the other characters come to understand what a complex job she has. To scholars the tumor represents the physical manifestation of not being able to take care of Buffy, or a form of mortality that Buffy will not soon face.

To Joss Whedon, the tumor represented nothing more than cancer. He planned to kill Joyce as early as the third season, and he wrote the episode to reflect what he experienced when he lost his own mother to a brain aneurysm. In 2001, Whedon told an interviewer, "I knew I was going to kill Joyce, and I knew that what I wanted to capture — because I had lost my own mother — was that weird dumb grief and the various reactions that people have to death." "The Body" begins with a Christmas dinner scene presided over by Joyce as the head of her chosen family. At the table are Buffy, Dawn, Giles, Willow, her girlfriend Tara (Amber Benson), Xander, and his ex-demon girlfriend Anya (Emma Caulfield). Pragmatically, the scene was included so the credits would not roll over the dramatic moments of Buffy finding her dead mother and trying to revive her. Whedon did not want to include any element that broke the illusion presented in the episode. In a realm where the main adolescent characters, who are becoming adults, must regularly face horrors and evils, Joyce represents a stable and predictable life. Her death crushes the illusion that real or normal life — which Buffy frequently says she wants but cannot have — is trouble-free. Joyce is mourned by all of the characters in the series. Even the amoral vampire Spike (James Marsters) expresses his condolences. In an earlier episode he had confided in a very sympathetic Joyce about his equally amoral and insane lover Drusilla (Juliet Landau) leaving him. Likewise, Anya, who has very little experience with human emotions and frailties, is confused and unexpectedly saddened by Joyce's death.

== Other appearances ==
Joyce appears in four episodes after her death in "The Body", first as a young woman in season 5's "The Weight of the World": Buffy has a recurring but false memory of her parents bringing Dawn home as a newborn. The episode deals with Buffy's inability to cope with her mother's death and her inadequacy at protecting Dawn, and explores Buffy's obsession with her failure and guilt. The sixth-season episode "Normal Again" posits Buffy's world of Sunnydale as a manifestation of psychopathology: after being stabbed by a demon, Buffy becomes convinced that the world in which she is a hero is an illusion. Her parents, who have remained happily married, visit her in a mental institution and encourage her to fight the seductive world she has imagined and return home with them. Joyce appears twice in the seventh season: she haunts Dawn as a face of the First Evil in "Conversations with Dead People", and makes her final appearance again as an incarnation of the First Evil in Buffy's dream in "Bring on the Night".

== Influence ==
Throughout the series, Buffy frequently expresses anxiety about being wanted and accepted. One of the most overt expressions of her concern is in the first-season episode "Nightmares", where characters' nightmares come true. In Buffy's nightmare, her father cruelly tells her he no longer wants to spend any time with her because of her defects as a daughter. She further worries that her ostensible troubled behavior at school and disobedience at home may have been a significant reason for the ending of her parents' marriage. She pushes away her friends and family to protect them from what she must face, while simultaneously depending on their assistance. Psychologists writing about Buffy state that she is a candidate for an anxiety disorder, as most often people diagnosed with anxiety disorders worry and fixate on problems, behaviors which studies suggest are inherited. In this light, they analyze Joyce's actions as overprotective of Buffy in early seasons: her vigilance causes Buffy to need to sneak in and out of the house through her bedroom window. Joyce is also continually encouraging her to avoid badly-behaved classmates. Regardless of this, Joyce's nurturing of Buffy is cited as being one of the reasons Buffy has been able to live as long as she has — much longer than other Slayers, who historically have usually died very young — and is a source of Buffy's strength. Joyce and Giles often work in similar ways to guide Buffy morally and emotionally. Buffy's tragic love affair with Angel, a relationship that could bring neither of them any happiness, was broken off, in part, after Joyce's request that Angel be the one to end it.

According to Lorna Jowett, Joyce is a vehicle through which older viewers can judge the actions of the younger characters. Jowett sees Joyce as a "post-feminist matriarch": she is the head of a household that rarely requires the presence of men. Buffy, according to Jowett, descends from two female lines: the Slayer line and the Summers line. In opposition to Buffy, Joyce never expresses that she has been abandoned by men, and she retains feminine characteristics: she runs an art gallery, has other friends, and dates. Jes Battis argues that Joyce's role as Buffy's mother goes mostly unnoticed because of societal expectations audiences are expected to make about single mothers — at least until her death. Buffy's grief must coincide with Buffy becoming who Joyce was. In this process, Buffy struggles to fill Joyce's role, finding it more difficult than being a Slayer.

== Appearances ==
Buffy the Vampire Slayer

Joyce appeared in 60 episodes of television, with Kristine Sutherland appearing as the character in 58 of them:

- Season 1 (1997): "Welcome to the Hellmouth", "The Harvest","Witch", "Angel", "The Puppet Show", "Nightmares", "Prophecy Girl"

- Season 2 (1997–98): "When She Was Bad", "School Hard", "Inca Mummy Girl", "Ted", "Bad Eggs", "Surprise", "Innocence", "Bewitched, Bothered, and Bewildered", "Passion", "Killed by Death", "Becoming (Part 1 and 2)"

- Season 3 (1998–99): "Anne", "Dead Man's Party", "Faith, Hope & Trick", "Band Candy", "Lovers Walk", "Amends", "Gingerbread", "Helpless", "Bad Girls", "Consequences", "Enemies", "Earshot", "Choices", "The Prom", "Graduation Day, Part 1"

- Season 4 (1999–2000): "The Freshman", "Fear, Itself", "This Year's Girl", "Who Are You", "Restless"

- Season 5 (2000–01): "Buffy vs. Dracula", "Real Me", "The Replacement", "Out of My Mind", "No Place Like Home", "Fool for Love", "Shadow", "Listening to Fear", "Into the Woods", "Triangle", "Checkpoint", "Blood Ties", "Crush", "I Was Made to Love You", "The Body", "Forever" (uncredited extra), "The Weight of the World" (vision)

- Season 6 (2001–02): "Normal Again" (vision)

- Season 7 (2002–03): "Him" (archive footage), "Conversations with Dead People" (vision), "Bring on the Night" (vision)

Joyce has also appeared in 5 canonical issues of the Buffy the Vampire Slayer comics.

- The Origin (1999): "The Origin, Part 1"

- Season 8 (2007–08): "The Long Way Home, Part 3" (vision), "After These Messages... We'll Be Right Back!" (vision)

- Season 9 (2013): "The Watcher" (vision)

- Season 10 (2014): "I Wish, Part 1" (vision)

== Bibliography ==
- Battis, Jes (2005). Blood Relations: Chosen Families in Buffy the Vampire Slayer and Angel, McFarland & Company, Inc., Publishers. ISBN 0-7864-2172-X
- Davidson, Joy (ed.) (2007). The Psychology of Joss Whedon: An Unauthorized Exploration of Buffy, Angel, and Firefly, Benbella Books. ISBN 978-1-933771-25-0
- Golden, Christopher; Holder, Nancy (1998). Buffy the Vampire Slayer: The Watcher's Guide, Volume 1, Pocket Books. ISBN 0-671-02433-7
- Holder, Nancy; Mariotte, Jeff; Hart, Maryelizabeth (2000). Buffy the Vampire Slayer: The Watcher's Guide, Volume 2, Pocket Books. ISBN 0-671-04260-2
- Jowett, Lorna (2005). Sex and the Slayer: A Gender Studies Primer for the Buffy Fan, Wesleyan University Press. ISBN 978-0-8195-6758-1
- Kaveney, Roz (ed.) (2004). Reading the Vampire Slayer: The New, Updated, Unofficial Guide to Buffy and Angel, Tauris Parke Paperbacks. ISBN 1-86064-984-X
- Ruditis, Paul (2004). Buffy the Vampire Slayer: The Watcher's Guide, Volume 3, Simon & Schuster. ISBN 0-689-86984-3
- South, James (ed.) (2003). Buffy the Vampire Slayer and Philosophy: Fear and Trembling in Sunnydale, Open Court Books. ISBN 0-8126-9531-3
- Stafford, Nikki (2007). Bite Me! The Unofficial Guide to Buffy the Vampire Slayer, ECW Press. ISBN 978-1-55022-807-6
- Tracy, Kathleen (1998). The Girl's Got Bite: The Unofficial Guide to Buffy's World, Renaissance Books. ISBN 1-58063-035-9
- Wilcox, Rhonda (2005). Why Buffy Matters: The Art of Buffy the Vampire Slayer, I. B. Tauris. ISBN 1-84511-029-3
- Wilcox, Rhonda and Lavery, David (eds.) (2002). Fighting the Forces: What's at Stake in Buffy the Vampire Slayer, Rowman and Littlefield Publishers. ISBN 0-7425-1681-4
