= Real Me (Buffy the Vampire Slayer) =

- Buffy the Vampire Slayer episode
- Episode no.: Season 5 Episode 2
- Directed by: David Grossman
- Written by: David Fury
- Production code: 5ABB02
- Original air date: October 3, 2000

Guest appearances
- Mercedes McNab as Harmony Kendall; Bob Morrisey as Crazy Guy #1; Amber Benson as Tara Maclay; Kristine Sutherland as Joyce Summers; Brian Turk as Mort; Chaney Kley (credited under his full name of Chaney Kley Minnis) as Brad Connick; Faith S. Abrahams as Peaches; Tom Lenk as Cyrus

Episode chronology
← Previous "Buffy vs. Dracula"	Next → "The Replacement"
- Buffy the Vampire Slayer season 5

"Real Me" is episode 2 of season 5 of the television show Buffy the Vampire Slayer. The episode aired on The WB on October 3, 2000.

== Plot ==
Buffy is annoyed when her sister Dawn continuously disrupts her training sessions with Giles as well as breakfast at home. Joyce asks Buffy to take Dawn shopping for school supplies, but Riley reminds her they had already made plans. Buffy has to cancel so she can go work with Giles, who has to drive the sisters on their errands in his new BMW convertible. The three spot Willow and Tara heading for the magic shop, and Buffy tells Willow that she is dropping Drama in favor of more Slayer training. At the shop, the gang finds the owner dead, killed by vampires. Buffy sends Dawn outside where she encounters a deranged man. He seems to recognize her, telling her that she does not belong there. She is upset until Tara comforts her. The gang realizes that a pack of vampires raided the shop for books on how to defeat the Slayer, under Harmony's leadership. Giles admires the shop and its potential for a future business.

That night, Xander and Anya arrive at the Summers house to babysit Dawn. Harmony arrives to challenge Buffy but is disappointed when she is not there. Xander taunts Harmony and her minions from the safety of the house until Dawn mistakenly invites Harmony inside. After Harmony puts up a fight, Anya intervenes and Xander kicks the vampire out of the house. Harmony later encounters Spike in the graveyard, and the two talk about Harmony's plans to kill the Slayer. While unpacking in their new place, Tara and Willow discuss how Dawn is having a hard time as the outsider of the Scooby Gang. Tara reveals that she has similar feelings as an outsider.

On patrol, Buffy is fuming about the lecture she received from her mother about allowing Dawn to see a dead body. Riley tries to talk some sense into her, pointing out she and Dawn resent each other for similar reasons. When they return home, Xander tells Buffy about Harmony and - after the Slayer stops laughing - she gets angry that Dawn invited Harmony inside. Buffy complains to Riley and Xander about the trouble Dawn causes and how she cannot always be there to protect her; Dawn listens from the hall and runs outside in tears. Before Anya can bring Dawn back inside, Harmony's vampire minions capture Dawn and attack Anya causing her to be hospitalized. Buffy then runs out to find her sister leaving Xander and Riley to take care of Anya.

Harmony explains to her minions that Dawn is bait, meaning they cannot eat her. Harmony complains to Dawn about her problems until her mutinous minions attempt to kill them both. Buffy – who had threatened Spike until he revealed Harmony's location – arrives and easily kills most of the minions as Harmony escapes. The Slayer frees her sister and, when they get home, they agree not to tell their mother. The next day, Buffy and Giles talk about his decision to take over the magic shop, while Dawn writes in her journal that Buffy still thinks she is a nobody, but she will be in for a surprise.

== Production details ==
When casting the role of Dawn, Sarah Michelle Gellar suggested they take a look at Michelle Trachtenberg. Dawn was originally conceived to be 12 years old, but after casting Trachtenberg, the writers raised the character's age to 14. However, the first few scripts were still written in the voice of a 12-year-old. Before being cast, Trachtenberg, a fan of the show, had written a letter to Joss Whedon that suggested how she could become a character on Buffy.

Michelle Trachtenberg was listed as a guest star in the previous episode. With effect from this episode she has been added to the title credits after Emma Caulfield.

Mark Rabinowitz of Paste Magazine argues that, at this point of the series, "the ensemble was so large that Dawn's "Zeppo" moment never materialized. It was planned for Season Seven, but once the First Evil storyline got big, Dawn's life had to take a backseat. That said, by the last 15 or 20 episodes of the show, Dawn had become...a valued member of the Scoobies. But not in this episode: Here, she's just a brat."

== Critical reception ==
Vox, ranking it at #101 of all 144 episodes on their "Worst to Best" list, and calling her "the Scrappy Doo of Buffy," writes, "Dawn comes off as a little more bratty and hard to deal with than she might have been otherwise. But her presence will anchor season five’s major arcs. And season five — which unites season two’s operatic story arcs with season three’s consistency — is one of Buffy's three unimpeachable seasons."
