= Checkpoint (Buffy the Vampire Slayer) =

- Buffy the Vampire Slayer episode
- Episode no.: Season 5 Episode 12
- Directed by: Nick Marck
- Written by: Doug Petrie; Jane Espenson
- Production code: 5ABB12
- Original air date: January 23, 2001

Guest appearances
- Clare Kramer as Glory; Charlie Weber as Ben; Cynthia LaMontagne as Lydia; Oliver Muirhead as Phillip; Kris Iyer as Nigel; Kevin Weisman as Dreg; Troy T. Blendell as Jinx; Amber Benson as Tara Maclay; Harris Yulin as Quentin Travers; Kristine Sutherland as Joyce Summers; Wesley Mask as Professor Roberts; Justin Gorence as Orlando; Peter Husmann as Mailman; Jack Thomas as Council Member #4; John O'Leary as Council Member #5

Episode chronology
← Previous "Triangle"	Next → "Blood Ties"
- Buffy the Vampire Slayer season 5

"Checkpoint" is episode 12 of season 5 of the television show Buffy the Vampire Slayer. The episode aired on January 23, 2001 on The WB. The episode shows the Council testing Buffy's skills, while Glory plans to go through Buffy to get the Key. At the end of the episode, it is revealed that Glory is a god, not a demon.

== Plot ==
The Scooby Gang discusses the Watchers' Council's impending visit to Sunnydale. Buffy recalls that her previous experiences with the Council put her life in danger, and wishes they would give her the information she needs.

Glory is at her place, in obvious pain. Dreg and another demon bring her a mailman, whom she drains of sanity to restore herself. The demons warn her that she is running out of time to use the key, but Glory assures them she will eliminate Buffy and get the Key. Jinx tells Ben that Glory wants information from him about Buffy. Ben beats up the demon.

Quentin Travers and a large team of Watchers arrive at the Magic Box and shut it down. Quentin announces that the Council plans to review Buffy's methods, skills, and abilities. The Watchers have information on Glory but will not reveal it until Buffy passes their tests; if she fails, they'll close the shop permanently and deport Giles. Buffy and Giles realize that they have to cooperate with the Council, but if Buffy fails, she will put everyone in even greater danger.

Council members interview the rest of the Scooby Gang for information about Buffy. They try not to incriminate her, and each tries to justify their usefulness without making it sound like Buffy needs their help. In the training room, Buffy is blindfolded, and her fighting skills are tested. She breaks a rib of her opponent, and Quentin abandons that test.

Upon returning home, Buffy finds Glory in her living room. Glory threatens to kill Buffy's friends and family while she watches. Visibly disturbed by this, Buffy takes Dawn and Joyce to Spike for protection.

On her way to the shop to meet with the council, three Knights Templar of the Order of Byzantium attack Buffy. Buffy overpowers the knights and learns from a captive that they are her enemies because she protects the Key, which they came to steal and destroy before Glory can claim it.

At the shop, Buffy tells Travers that she is no longer cooperating with the review. She points out that Glory and the Council both need something from her: the location of the Key, and a purpose for their jobs, respectively. She demands that Giles be reinstated as her Watcher and that the Council give her the information. Quentin reluctantly agrees, then informs Buffy that Glory is not a demon – she is a god.

== Reception ==
Noel Murray of The A.V. Club wrote that Checkpoint was a "highly entertaining episode" with "narrative and thematic significance," adding, "The real fight that Buffy has been staging for five years now may not be between good and evil, but between hidebound traditionalism and ingenious innovation, and between elitism and democratization... What better symbol for the degraded state of The Old Ways than a mad god in stylish clothes, sucking the brains of postmen and walking right into the Summers house and staring straight at Dawn — the object she seeks — while remaining completely ignorant."

Reviewer Mikelangelo Marinaro wrote for the Critically Touched Reviews website that this "wonderfully pleasant episode" is "Buffy's first serious take on the subject of power, which of course is a major theme of S7." Marinaro discusses how "Checkpoint stays focused on Buffy and how she takes another fine step into adulthood while discovering more about her power as a Slayer which, of course, is a big theme of the season." The reviewer gave the episode grades of 90/100 and A−.

A. M. Dellamonica, writing a recap for the Tor Books website, concludes, "Though [this is] not a primarily comic episode, the Scooby interviews are chucklesome. And even though, in dramatic terms, this confrontation has superficial similarities to the one between the Scoobies and the Maclays in Family, I can't help but love that sense of a bill coming due. The Watchers have been needing comeuppance. That they get it direct from the sacrificial teen they've been happy to think of as 'their instrument' only makes it sweeter."
