= Helpless (Buffy the Vampire Slayer) =

- Buffy the Vampire Slayer episode
- Episode no.: Season 3 Episode 12
- Directed by: James A. Contner
- Written by: David Fury
- Production code: 3ABB12
- Original air date: January 19, 1999

Guest appearances
- Kristine Sutherland as Joyce Summers; Jeff Kober as Zachary Kralik; Harris Yulin as Quentin Travers; Dominic Keating as Blair; David Haydn-Jones as Hobson; Nick Cornish as Guy; Don Dowe as Construction Worker

Episode chronology
← Previous "Gingerbread"	Next → "The Zeppo"
- Buffy the Vampire Slayer season 3

"Helpless" is the twelfth episode of season three of the television show Buffy the Vampire Slayer. It was written by David Fury, directed by James A. Contner, and first broadcast on The WB on January 19, 1999. Giles and the Watcher's Council administer a test which drains Buffy of her Slayer powers.

== Plot ==
In the library, Giles shows Buffy a variety of crystals, ostensibly to teach her how to identify them. Later, on patrol, Buffy's strength suddenly deserts her and she is nearly killed by a vampire. Buffy reports the problem to Giles and demonstrates her poor performance when throwing knives at a target. At home, Buffy is disappointed to find that her father is too busy to take her to the ice show for her 18th birthday; she suggests to Giles that he could take her instead. Giles has Buffy stare at a crystal until she falls into a trance, then injects her with a mysterious substance. Meanwhile, Quentin Travers, the head watcher, sets up an extreme test for the slayer, assisted by two men named Hobson and Blair.

Buffy tries to intervene when Cordelia's argument with an aggressive suitor becomes physical, but she is casually knocked aside. Buffy enlists the help of her friends to figure out what is wrong. She visits Angel who gives her a book for her birthday. He tells her about how he saw her before she was the slayer and how he loved her from the second he first saw her. Kralik, the captive vampire intended for Buffy's test, breaks out of his straitjacket while Blair is giving him his pills. He turns Blair into a vampire.

Giles goes to find Quentin at the Sunnydale Arms building, but discovers that Kralik is missing and Hobson is dead. Buffy, walking home alone, is confronted by Kralik. Blair chases her until Giles drives by and picks her up. At the Summers' home, Joyce hears a noise out front where she finds Kralik wrapped up in Buffy's jacket. Giles tells Buffy that she has lost her strength due to the injections of muscle relaxant and adrenaline suppressors he had given her, and about the test. Furious, Buffy returns home where she finds a photograph of her mother, bound to a chair and gagged by Kralik.

Buffy goes to the Sunnydale Arms building, beats Blair unconscious and then is chased by Kralik until his need for pills becomes unbearable. Buffy steals them away, and slides down a laundry chute where she finds her mother. Kralik breaks through the door and grabs his pills back, washing them down with a nearby glass of water. Buffy had filled the glass with holy water, causing Kralik to burn from within. Buffy frees her mother as Giles arrives and stakes Blair.

Back at the library, Quentin congratulates Buffy on her accomplishment, but Buffy is also angry with him. Because of Giles' fatherly relationship with the slayer, Quentin fires him from the Watchers' Council and prepares to assign a new watcher to Buffy, warning them not to interfere before leaving. However, Giles is still the school librarian and offers to help Buffy as a freelancer.

== Reception ==
A reviewer for the BBC wrote that the slayer test made no sense and that "Helpless" would have been better if Faith, the second slayer, were also present. The review said the betrayal of Buffy by Giles, and the strains on their growing father-daughter relationship, was "heart-wrenching". Noel Murray of The A.V. Club described the episode as "one of the most overtly horrific, with creepy dark houses and blood-spattered rooms".

Myles McNutt notes that "our central characters really are alone in this fight. This doesn't mean they are helpless, of course, but it does mean that they don't have an army behind them," and that "Kralik is dangerous but has no plans to take over the world, which means that all of the consequences are about character rather than the end of the world."

Vox ranked this episode at #71 out of the 144 Buffy episodes, in honor of the 20th anniversary of the show, saying, "Add in a whole mess of subplots involving Buffy pining after her dad and Angel doing some of his most self-indulgent moping, and 'Helpless' loses some of the spark it could've had by making Buffy fend for herself without her powers for the first time since before the show began. But the episode ends on a touching note when Giles gets fired from the Council for being too much like a father to Buffy, a charge he can't — and doesn't want to — deny."
