= Choices (Buffy the Vampire Slayer) =

- Buffy the Vampire Slayer episode
- Episode no.: Season 3 Episode 19
- Directed by: James A. Contner
- Written by: David Fury
- Production code: 3ABB19
- Original air date: May 4, 1999

Guest appearances
- Kristine Sutherland as Joyce Summers; Harry Groener as Mayor Richard Wilkins; Alexis Denisof as Wesley Wyndam-Pryce; Eliza Dushku as Faith Lehane; Armin Shimerman as Principal Snyder; Keith Brunsman as Vamp-Lackey; Jimmie F. Skaggs as Courier; Jason Reed as Vamp-Guard; Bonita Friedericy as Manager; Michael Schoenfeld as Security Guard #1; Seth Coltan as Security Guard #2; Brett Moses as Student

Episode chronology
← Previous "Earshot"	Next → "The Prom"
- Buffy the Vampire Slayer season 3

"Choices" is the nineteenth episode of season 3 of the television show Buffy the Vampire Slayer. It was written by David Fury, directed by James A. Contner, and first broadcast on May 4, 1999 on The WB.

The Mayor of Sunnydale continues magical rituals to prepare his Ascension to become a mighty demon, and the Scoobies do what they can to prevent it. Meanwhile, they plan for life after high school.

== Plot ==
The Box of Gavrok is due to arrive by courier at the airport; the Mayor offers Faith a knife in return for intercepting it.

Buffy continues to fret about her future with Angel, while struggling to decide between going to college at Northwestern University in Illinois or studying closer to home at UC Sunnydale. Knowing that Wesley and Giles will not let her leave easily with the Ascension still looming, she offers a deal: if she takes the offensive against the Mayor, defeats him, and stops the Ascension, they will accept her resignation as a Slayer so she can attend college in Illinois.

That night, Faith kills the courier, and separates him from the box by taking off his hand. Watching from the bushes, Buffy sees Faith deliver the box to the Mayor. After the coast is clear, Buffy forces the driver to disclose information about the box before staking him.

The gang plan an attack on City Hall to steal the Box of Gavrok. First, Willow will remove the magic protecting the box so Buffy and Angel can take it. Then, Xander and Oz will prepare the ritual Willow will use to destroy the box. Wesley and Giles drop off Buffy, Willow and Angel at City Hall. Everything goes fine until Buffy is being lowered through a skylight to the Box and her rope sticks, and an alarm goes off. As two vampires enter, Angel drops to Buffy's rescue. After a fight, they escape with the Box. The Mayor's anger and the gang's relief reverse when it is discovered that Faith has captured Willow.

In the library, a heated discussion ensues on whether Willow's life is worth many thousands who could be saved if the box is destroyed. Oz settles the matter by smashing the pot containing the potion needed for the ritual. Buffy tells Giles to set up a meeting to exchange Willow for the Box of Gavrok. At City Hall, Willow escapes from the room she is imprisoned in and examines the Mayor's office. She is reading the Books of Ascension when Faith finds her. Giles's call comes in time to stop Faith from killing her.

During their meeting in the school cafeteria, the Mayor warns Buffy and Angel that they have no future together due to Angel's immortality as a vampire; this after the Mayor watched his own wife age and come to resent him for his own immortality. They make the trade, but are disrupted by Principal Snyder and his security guards, bent on drug-busting. One of the guards opens the box and a large beetle-like creature jumps out and kills him. Another beetle breaks free and the two attack the Mayor and Buffy. Buffy squashes one and Faith kills the other by throwing her knife and pinning the creature to the wall. Despite Willow being rescued and taking a few important pages she tore from the Books of Ascension, Wesley points out that the gang are still no closer to knowing how to stop the Ascension.

At school the next day, Buffy and Willow talk again about their future. Buffy ultimately cannot bring herself to leave her home of Sunnydale knowing that she will always have something to battle, so decides to attend UC Sunnydale. Despite being accepted into multiple prestigious out-of-state colleges, Willow decides to attend college with Buffy instead, having realized that fighting evil and studying Wicca are what she wants to do. Late at night, Buffy and Angel try to reassure each other that they could have a future together despite the Mayor's warnings, but both secretly remain unconvinced.

Xander spots Cordelia taking a long time to browse in a dress store. When he confronts her and suggests she may have been rejected from college because she refused to tell the others where she plans on studying, she shows him acceptance letters from multiple colleges, but does not tell him that she is actually working at the dress store.

== Reception ==
Vox, rating it at #98 in a list of all 144 episodes, writes, "As this hour comes in the middle of what might be the most consistent stretch of Buffy episodes ever, it's perhaps a bit underrated. But still: Putting a lot of emphasis on the characters' college choices is a bit of false drama, simply because we know that if the show is to continue, they'll all end up at the same school."

Billie Doux, giving the episode 3 out of 4 stakes, writes, "The spiders in a box subplot was just that — subordinate to the real action, which appears to be moving toward a big climax, a big split, and almost incidentally, commencement." She adds, "Joss Whedon just spent three years satirizing high school. I'm ready to see what he can do with college."

Noel Murray of The A.V. Club described "Choices" as "an exciting episode, marked by an especially rousing score and some of the best fight scenes I've yet seen on the show". He went on to praise Willow's character development, and the way the episode "reinforced its theme in nearly every plot point, line of dialogue and set dressing". A review for the BBC criticised the plot, particularly Willow being kidnapped and staying to read the Books of Ascension rather than escaping, but praised the character interactions and Alyson Hannigan's performance.
