= Big Bad =

Major recurring adversary

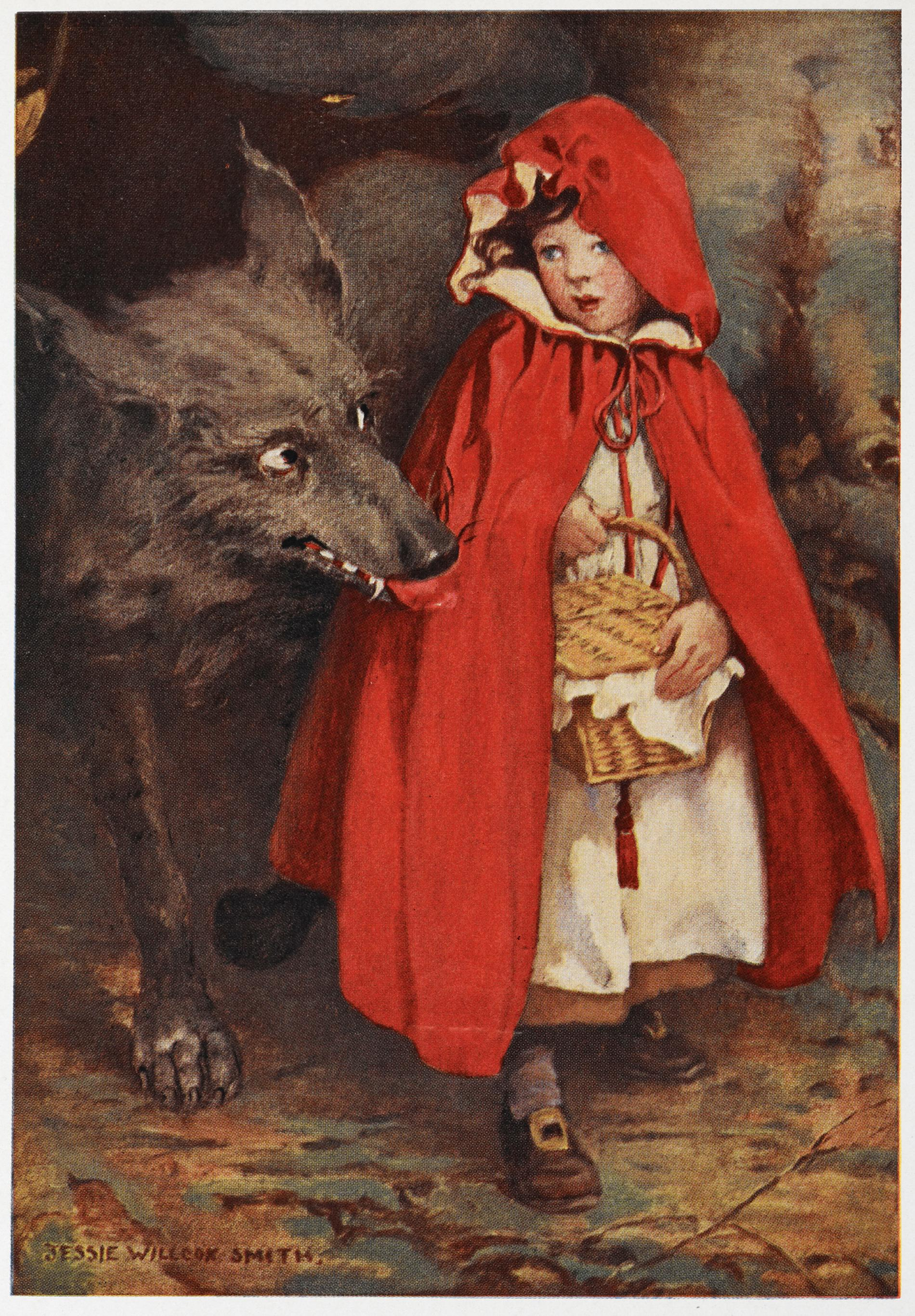
In a 2014 book, Kimberley McMahon-Coleman and Roslyn Weaver speculated that the Big Bad Wolf of fairy tales such as Little Red Riding Hood may be the origin of the phrase in Buffy the Vampire Slayer

Big Bad is a term to describe a major recurring adversary, usually the chief villain or antagonist in a television series or a particular broadcast season of a series, originally used by the series Buffy the Vampire Slayer. It has since been used to describe annual villains in other television series, and has also been used in scholarly work discussing Buffy the Vampire Slayer.

In gaming, this term is often abbreviated BBEG, which stands for "Big Bad Evil Guy/Gal," a tradition that began on message boards for the tabletop role-playing game Dungeons & Dragons.

== On Buffy the Vampire Slayer ==
The term "Big Bad" was originally used on American television program Buffy the Vampire Slayer (which aired 1997–2003). According to author Kevin Durand (2009), "While Buffy confronts various forms of evil during each episode, each season of Buffy the Vampire Slayer had its own 'big bad' villain who dominates throughout the season. The power of the 'big bad' always threatens to end the world, but Buffy ultimately overcomes him or her in the season finale." The series balanced its episodic stories with advancing that season's big bad story arc.

The term was originally used in the episode "Bewitched, Bothered and Bewildered", in which Buffy Summers describes the newly soulless Angel as "the big, bad thing in the dark". The prior episode, "Phases", has Xander Harris "being" the werewolf and saying, "I'm the big, bad wolf." The phrase may originate in various fairy tales (particularly "Three Little Pigs" and the related song) about the "Big Bad Wolf". The phrase "big bad" by itself as a noun was first used on screen in Season 3, in the episode "Gingerbread" where Buffy says that an occult symbol is harmless, "not a big bad". Slang generation was encouraged in the writers' room. Marti Noxon, writer and eventually showrunner, said that "Big Bad" was used "long before the characters themselves started using the phrase". Using "big bad" as a noun instead of using as an adjective is a functional shift, which was done often on the show.

The first "Big Bad" villain on the program was The Master, played by Mark Metcalf. According to author Jan Jagodzinski, the battle between Buffy and the evil Master is "the central issue of season one"; The Master, like all the "big bads", is a "symptom of postmodernity".

David Sims of The Atlantic wrote that Joss Whedon, creator of the series, made the model for the Golden Age of television:

Years before streaming TV existed, Whedon helped create the bingeable serial drama—one that endeavored to make every episode a special event, without taking the audience's eyes off the larger story being woven. In basic terms, he did this by making sure every season had a "big bad": a villain or antihero with larger machinations developing in the background of every episode, twinned to our hero Buffy and her resolute band of friends in some magical way. Every season would build to an action-packed climax with sacrifices made and lessons learned, but along the way, Buffy would face off against minions of the "big bad", problems of her own making, and various other monsters of the week amid whirlwinds of teen angst. It was a heady formula, but a surprisingly unusual one for 1997.

== On other television and film series ==
The use of Big Bads has become common in TV science fiction and fantasy series, especially with more binge-watching of serialized shows.

In the Arrowverse, after 8 years and 20 collective seasons, the series Arrow, The Flash, Supergirl and Legends of Tomorrow had 22 Big Bads, which TVLine ranked based on "Compelling Backstory, Fearsome Appearance, Powers/Skills, Utter Ruthlessness, Eeeevilness of Agenda, Despicable Damage Done". But Den of Geek's Dave Golder questioned the continued use of the "season-long baddie" plot device.

The Doctor Who revival has occasionally used Big Bads. Jef Rouner of the Houston Press wrote how Doctor Who series 6 succeed with the "proper format," beginning with a new villain to the series, the Silence. He also wrote that for series 11, "The main villain is regular old human cruelty and apathy to suffering", adding this had some similarity to Buffy the Vampire Slayer season 6's Big Bad, “life.” But Lacy Baugher wrote on Syfy Wire that the show can have the smaller personal, emotional stories, and doesn't need the "big, sweeping arcs and grand monsters". "Each Big Bad the Doctor faced had to be the most dangerous in the universe."

Dexter and its spin-offs have always used Big Bads in each season. Greg MacArthur of Screen Rant thinks the best Big Bad of all is Arthur Mitchell, villain of the fourth season, for being "Dexter's greatest foe who left the most devastating effect on Dexter in the entire series." Unanimously agreed by almost all critics and fans, along with Arthur Mitchell, others great Big Bads are Brian Moser, villain of the first season and Dexter's brother, James Doakes, Dexter's archenemy and antagonist of the second season, and Travis Marshall, villain of the sixth season, being praised his relationship with Professor Gellard and the subsequent plot twist revealing that Gellard is his Dark Passenger.

In the Marvel Cinematic Universe, the Big Bad for "The Infinity Saga" was Thanos. In "The Multiverse Saga", the current one, the new big bad is Victor von Doom / Doctor Doom.

== See also ==
- Boss (video gaming)
