= The Zeppo =

- Buffy the Vampire Slayer episode
- Episode no.: Season 3 Episode 13
- Directed by: James Whitmore, Jr.
- Written by: Dan Vebber
- Production code: 3ABB13
- Original air date: January 26, 1999

Guest appearances
- Saverio Guerra as Willy the Snitch; Channon Roe as Jack O'Toole; Michael Cudlitz as Bob; Eliza Dushku as Faith Lehane; Darin Heames as Parker; Scott Torrence as Dickie; Whitney Dylan as Lysette; Vaughn Armstrong as Cop

Episode chronology
← Previous "Helpless"	Next → "Bad Girls"
- Buffy the Vampire Slayer season 3

"The Zeppo" is episode thirteen of season three of Buffy the Vampire Slayer. It was written by Dan Vebber, directed by James Whitmore, Jr., and first broadcast on The WB on January 26, 1999. Feeling left out by the gang, Xander ends up accompanying a student named Jack O'Toole, who raises some friends from the dead and decides to blow up the high school. Meanwhile, the rest of the gang are trying to stop an apocalypse.

== Plot ==
Xander helps out the gang with another demon vanquishing, but Buffy worries about his safety and asks him to stay "fray-adjacent", upsetting him.

When a student throws him a football, Xander drops it onto Jack O'Toole's lunch, resulting in Jack threatening to beat him up. Cordelia, having witnessed the event, tells Xander, since all of his friends are slayers, werewolves, witches, and watchers, while he is nothing, he is useless and expendable like Zeppo Marx (least popular member of the Marx Brothers, who quit performing with the group). Meanwhile, Giles informs Buffy that the end of the world is near. The Sisterhood of Jhe, a group of fierce demons, is planning to reopen the Hellmouth.

Xander gets himself a car in the hope it will make him useful and cool, but finds the only girl who is interested has nothing in common with him and only likes the car. He accidentally rear-ends Jack, who is sitting in a parked car. Jack threatens Xander with a knife, but when a cop shows up, Xander covers for Jack and gains his respect. They go to get the rest of Jack's friends who, being dead, need to be raised from their graves.

Buffy, Willow and Giles are researching in the library. Giles leaves to contact some "spirit guides" and hopefully get their help with stopping the sisterhood.

Xander takes Jack and his group of friends to steal supplies to build a bomb. He spots Willow leaving the magic shop and tries to talk to her; she tells him that she loves him before hurrying off to help Buffy. Jack and his friends try to initiate Xander into their group – by killing him, because it turns out Jack is dead as well. Xander flees. He rescues Faith from a member of the sisterhood by hitting it with his car, then they go to Faith's motel room where she seduces him. Afterwards, she kicks him out, clothes in hand.

Meanwhile, back at the library, Willow and Giles struggle to get Oz (in werewolf form) away from the Hellmouth. They sedate him and lock him in the basement.

Xander realizes that Jack and his group have built a bomb. He seeks help from Buffy, but she is too busy having an emotional encounter with Angel. On his way to see Giles to warn him, Xander sees Jack's zombie group and drags one of them with his car until he confesses the location of the bomb. Xander finds the bomb in the school basement and vanquishes three of Jack's zombie minions, but Jack shows up and they fight. Xander positions himself between Jack and the exit door so that Jack has no hope of escaping before the bomb explodes. Jack defuses the bomb with seconds to spare and turns to leave, swearing revenge. He opens the door, releasing Oz, who immediately attacks and eats him. Meanwhile, at the library, Buffy, Angel, Faith, Giles and Willow fight off a giant multi-headed monster and the members of the Sisterhood of Jhe before successfully closing the Hellmouth.

The next day, the bruised Buffy, Willow, Giles, and Oz sit at a table discussing how they saved the world from destruction. Oz finds himself strangely not hungry after waking up. Xander, not knowing anything of their battle and vice versa, comes by to chat with them. After a few seconds of talk, Xander decides to keep his harrowing night-long adventure to himself (aware that his friends will never believe such a story, no matter how he tells it). As he walks away, Cordelia once again taunts him over being left out of the group, but Xander merely smiles and walks by, quietly secure and confident in his place in the world and realizing that, with or without Buffy, he can survive on his own.

== Production details ==
Dan Vebber wrote two scripts for the show: "Lovers Walk" and "The Zeppo". Although there are earlier episodes where Xander is central to the plot (e.g. "The Pack"), this episode is unusual in that the story is largely told from Xander's point of view. The world-saving activities of the main cast are portrayed as secondary until the plot lines eventually converge.

== Themes ==
Essayist Emily (last name not given) of the site InsectReflection.com compares Jack O'Toole and Xander and their respective views of masculinity:

Even undead, he's still more schoolyard bully than horrific monster, but that makes him a more direct danger to Xander, as he can impose emasculation directly onto him. This emasculation is coded homo-erotically, in an Ancient-Greece sense. O'Toole threatens to "take" Xander, grabs him from behind, holds up a penetrative object and asks him where he "wants it". Xander's immediate insistence that he and Jack were "rasslin', but not in a gay way" stems from his intertwined fear of emasculation and homosexuality. ... This whole episode is an exercise in "be careful what you wish for", in which Xander achieves successful masculinity, and has a terrible time because of it.

Theresa Basile compares him with the brave hobbit Sam in The Lord of the Rings and writes, "He’s a would-be 'man's man' – obsessed with being manly – whose only close friends are women. He's both a perpetrator and victim of sexual assault and/or violation of consent. He's both attracted to and intimidated by strong women. He jokes about objectifying women and viewing sex as some sort of game, but in more intimate moments, seems to value romance and real connection. He's a willing participant in the patriarchy and also a victim of it."

== Cultural references ==
InsectReflection.com notes that the earlier episode "'Helpless' directly compared Buffy to Superman – a comparison that has been made before since 'Never Kill a Boy on the First Date' – and 'The Zeppo' follows up on that by comparing Xander to Jimmy Olsen, Superman's sidekick. He has accepted Buffy's role as Hero, but is struggling to find his own role within the same genre structure."

== Reception and influence ==
Vox ranked it at #34 of the 144 Buffy episodes, writing that "this episode, which sees him sidelined by his friends as they try to stop yet another impending apocalypse, is truly Xander-centric: Isolated from the gang, he falls in with a bad (read: dead) crowd, has a, uh, romantic encounter with Faith, and eventually averts an apocalypse of his own. ... But the episode reminds us that he charges into battle beside his friends time and again not because he's gifted, or tasked by some higher power, but because he chooses to. Which is, in some ways, even more noble."

Noel Murray of The A.V. Club wrote that "The Zeppo" had become a favorite episode of his, saying, "What I loved about 'The Zeppo' is how Xander's feelings of abandonment pervade the structure of the episode, which is filled with moments that are (intentionally) dramatically unsatisfying." In Entertainment Weekly's list of the 25 best Whedonverse episodes—including episodes from Buffy, as well as Angel, Firefly and Dollhouse—"The Zeppo" placed at No. 23. TV Squad's Keith McDuffee listed "The Zeppo" as the fifth best episode of the series. The episode was nominated for an Emmy Award for Outstanding Makeup in a Series.

Theresa Basile calls it an overrated episode, saying, "This is the boy who brought Buffy back to life in 'Prophecy Girl', helped her save Willow/Cordelia/Giles/Jenny in 'When She Was Bad', constantly patrolled with her throughout season two, pulled Cordelia out of a fire, and rescued Giles in 'Becoming Part 2', all without the aid of supernatural powers – and all of a sudden, he’s a useless drain on the Scooby gang whom they need to protect? They sacrifice character for the sake of a fairly weak parody that doesn’t actually become funny until the final act." On the other hand, she liked "the zombie frat boys who enjoy Walker, Texas Ranger, because that is some inspired silliness right there."

InsectReflection.com notes, "This episode is quietly a turning point for Xander's character. More than that, it’s quietly one of the best and most unique episodes in the series. ... This is, in fact, an episode of Xander the Zombie Fighter, inside which occurs an episode of Buffy the Vampire Slayer."

The episode has proved influential on later television writers. In his "Production Notes: Doodles in the Margins of Time", Doctor Who executive producer Russell T Davies said that he was inspired by "The Zeppo", along with the Star Trek: The Next Generation episode "Lower Decks", when writing the 2006 "Doctor-lite" episode "Love & Monsters", which started an annual tradition for an episode with little involvement of the lead cast. Joss Whedon himself cites it as influential to his later series Agents of S.H.I.E.L.D.
