= Gingerbread (Buffy the Vampire Slayer) =

- Buffy the Vampire Slayer episode
- Episode no.: Season 3 Episode 11
- Directed by: James Whitmore, Jr.
- Story by: Jane Espenson; Thania St. John
- Teleplay by: Jane Espenson
- Production code: 3ABB11
- Original air date: January 12, 1999

Guest appearances
- Kristine Sutherland as Joyce Summers; Elizabeth Anne Allen as Amy Madison; Harry Groener as Mayor Richard Wilkins; Jordan Baker as Sheila Rosenberg; Armin Shimerman as Principal Snyder; Lindsay Taylor as Little Girl; Shawn Pyfrom as Little Boy; Blake Swendson as Michael; Grant Garrison as Roy; Roger Morrissey as Demon; Daniel Tamm as Mooster

Episode chronology
← Previous "Amends"	Next → "Helpless"
- Buffy the Vampire Slayer season 3

"Gingerbread" is episode eleven of season three of the television show Buffy the Vampire Slayer. It was written by Thania St. John and Jane Espenson, directed by James Whitmore, Jr., and first broadcast on The WB on January 12, 1999. The whole town of Sunnydale vengefully investigates the death of two children, blind to the fairy tale aspects of the situation.

== Plot ==
While waiting in the park for Buffy, her mother Joyce discovers the bodies of two dead children. At school the next day, Buffy shows Giles a symbol which was visible on the hands of the two children. He tells her that demons do not use symbols, and that it is no doubt occult-related. This angers Buffy, as Slayers are forbidden to harm humans, even dark witches.

At lunch, Buffy tells the Scooby Gang about the murders. Joyce shows up and announces that there will be a vigil at City Hall that night, as she has founded a group called MOO (Mothers Opposed to the Occult). Many concerned parents attend the vigil, including Willow's mother. Mayor Wilkins says a few words before Joyce gives a speech about how the people of Sunnydale must take back their city from the monsters, witches, and slayers.

Later, Michael, Amy, and Willow perform a spell in a circle that surrounds the symbol Buffy saw on the children's hands. Buffy finds the symbol in one of Willow's notebooks. Willow explains that the symbol is part of a protection spell for Buffy's upcoming birthday.

Meanwhile, all the school lockers are searched for witch-related material, and Giles's occult books are seized by police. Amy and Willow are taken to Principal Snyder's office for questioning.

At Buffy's home, Joyce forbids Buffy to see Willow anymore, takes credit for the locker searches and states that Buffy's slaying does Sunnydale no good. The ghosts of two children appear to Joyce and tell her that she has to hurt the "bad girls".

At the park, Buffy talks with Angel, who convinces her not to give up fighting. When he makes a passing remark about the children and their parents, Buffy is struck by the thought that the children's parents were never seen or mentioned, and the fact that no one knows the children's names. After using the Internet to contact Willow, the Scooby Gang learns that every fifty years throughout history, the murdered bodies of two nameless children have been found, resulting in peaceful communities being torn apart by vigilante chaos. The earliest record dates from Germany during 1649, where a cleric from the Black Forest discovered the corpses of "Hans and Greta Strauss", inspiring the fairy tale of Hansel and Gretel. Giles explains that certain demons thrive on watching humans destroy each other through persecution and ignorance. According to Giles, this is what set off the Salem Witch Trials.

Buffy and Giles are knocked out with chloroform by Joyce and her friends, at the behest of the two children. Amy, Willow, and Buffy are taken to City Hall where they are tied to wooden posts surrounded by books. Cordelia finds Giles unconscious and wakes him, and they rush to City Hall. Just as Buffy wakes up, her mother lights books on fire, sentencing the three girls to death by burning at the stake. Amy escapes by transforming herself into a rat.

At City Hall, Cordelia uses a fire hose to put the burning stakes out. The two children transform into a large demon which charges at Buffy. She breaks her wooden post and uses it to impale the demon.

Buffy and Willow play with Amy the rat and are looking for a way to restore her to human form. Buffy's and Willow's mothers have forgotten about what happened but Willow's mom remembers Willow said she is dating Oz, and he has been invited to dinner.

== Cultural references ==
Snyder says, "I love the smell of desperate librarian in the morning," mockingly misquoting the famous line from the movie Apocalypse Now, "I love the smell of napalm in the morning."

Willow tells her mom, "The last time we had a conversation over three minutes, it was about the patriarchal bias of the Mr. Rogers Show!" Sheila makes finger quotes: "Well, with King Friday lording it over all the lesser puppets..." A reference to Mister Rogers' Neighborhood, a children's show created by Fred Rogers.

Xander teases the MOO supporters who are guarding tied-up Buffy, Willow and Amy, "What's with the grim?" The Brothers Grimm wrote "Hansel and Gretel."

Buffy complains, "The bad keeps coming back and getting stronger. Like that kid in the story, the boy that stuck his finger in the duck." Angel clarifies, "Dike. It's another word for dam." Buffy: "Oh. Okay, that story makes a lot more sense now." The story about the Little Dutch Boy who saves Holland by plugging a hole in a leaking dam, and stays there all night until the villagers find him, appears in the novel Hans Brinker, or The Silver Skates by Mary Mapes Dodge.

== Reception ==
The episode received mixed reviews. Vox ranked it at #86 of all 144 episodes on their "Every Episode Ranked From Worst to Best" list (to mark the 20th anniversary of the show), calling it "another Jane Espenson episode, one that shows off both her strengths and her weaknesses. ... But no other writer can make comedic dialogue sparkle quite like Espenson can. 'We need to save Buffy from Hansel and Gretel' could only come from her."

Reviewer Billie Doux writes, "Buffy, with her usual wit and candor, went right to the heart of the wrongness of book burning with 'What if the anti-hell-sucking book isn't on the approved reading list?' ... And it was nice to see Buffy striking fear in the hearts of a gang of (male) high school bullies, as well she should." Mark Oshiro says, "There’s a powerful metaphor here for how a mob mentality approaches something or someone they don’t understand, and how that sort of behavior is inherently destructive. ... [T]hese people care only about being offended. ... Their delicate sensibilities are more important than actual social ills."

Noel Murray of The A.V. Club praised "Gingerbread" for its humorous dialogue and the way it progressed the story arc, but criticized the action as slow and repetitive.
