= Kristine Sutherland =

American actress (born 1955)

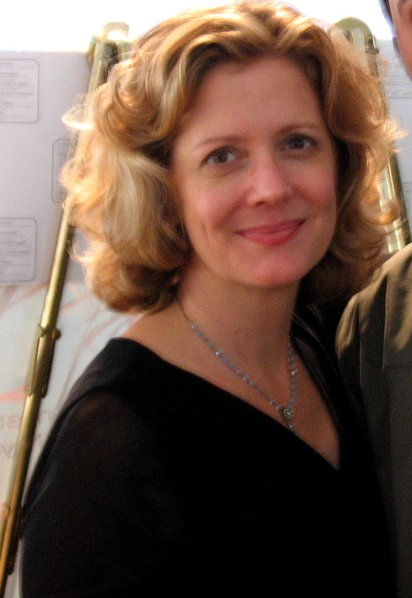
- Sutherland in 2005
- Born: Kristine Young; April 17, 1955 (age 71); Boise, Idaho
- Occupation: Actress
- Years active: 1984–present
- Spouse: John Pankow (m. 1986)
- Children: 1

Kristine Sutherland (born Kristine Young; April 17, 1955) is an American actress best known for her starring role as Buffy Summers' mother Joyce Summers on the television series Buffy the Vampire Slayer, where she appeared in every season (1997–2003), and her role as Mae Thompson in Honey, I Shrunk the Kids (1989).

== Early life ==
She was born Kristine Young in Boise, Idaho, and changed her name because she was often confused with another similarly named actress. The last name "Sutherland" was after her cat, whom she named "Donald" after Donald Sutherland, who, coincidentally, had a role in the original Buffy the Vampire Slayer film, Joss Whedon's first attempt to bring Buffy to audiences. She is not related to the Sutherland acting family.

She attended high school in Lexington, Kentucky, where she participated in the Tates Creek Drama program. After graduating, she enrolled in the University of Kentucky.

== Career ==
Sutherland's first film role was as a secretary in Legal Eagles (1986). She appeared as Mae Thompson in the 1989 film Honey, I Shrunk the Kids. Her career received a big boost when she played Buffy's mother in the action-horror television series Buffy the Vampire Slayer, from 1997 to 2002. Creator Joss Whedon later stated that one of the reasons he chose Sutherland for the role was that she exuded a warm demeanor, as well as what he believed to be a close resemblance to actress Sarah Michelle Gellar, who was to portray her daughter in the series. Sutherland appeared regularly on the show for the first five seasons, with only one appearance in season 6 and two in season 7.

After leaving Buffy, Sutherland attended a photography course at the Santa Monica College and subsequently set up a studio specializing in portraits. In 2008, she appeared in the television miniseries Comanche Moon and had a guest role in an episode of New Amsterdam.

She voiced Haru's Mother in the English dub of The Cat Returns.

== Personal life ==
Sutherland is married to actor John Pankow. They have one daughter.

== Filmography ==
=== Film ===
Year	Title	Role	Notes
1986	Legal Eagles	Secretary #2	
1989	Honey, I Shrunk the Kids	Mae Thompson	
2005	The Cat Returns	Naoko Yoshioka (voice)	English version
2012	The Perfect Wedding	Meryl Fowler	
2016	Russian Doll	Marjorie Ames	
2016	Are You Afraid of the '90s?	Jane	Short film

=== Television ===
Year	Title	Role	Notes
1984	Hot Pursuit		Episode: "Portrait of a Lady Killer"
1984	Remington Steele	Pamela Jones	Episode: "Let's Steel a Plot"
1986–1987	Easy Street	Martha	2 episodes
1987	The Art of Being Nick	Marlene Moore	Television pilot
1994	California Dreams	Ariel Lange	Episode: "Daddy's Girl"
1997–2002	Buffy the Vampire Slayer	Joyce Summers	58 episodes
2002	Providence	Joyce Moore	Episode: "Things Have Changed"
2008	Comanche Moon	Elmira Forsythe	2 episodes
2008	New Amsterdam	Didi Gleason	Episode: "Reclassified"
2010–2011	One Life to Live	Dean McKenzie	4 episodes
2013	The Following	Parker's Mother	Episode: "The Fall"

=== Video games ===
Year	Title	Role	Notes
2013	Grand Theft Auto V	The Local Population	
