= Potential (Buffy the Vampire Slayer) =

- Buffy the Vampire Slayer episode
- Episode no.: Season 7 Episode 12
- Directed by: James A. Contner
- Written by: Rebecca Rand Kirshner
- Production code: 7ABB12
- Original air date: January 21, 2003

Guest appearances
- Tom Lenk as Andrew Wells; Iyari Limon as Kennedy; Clara Bryant as Molly; Indigo as Rona; Sarah Hagan as Amanda; James C. Leary as Clem; Felicia Day as Vi; Derek Anthony as Imposing Demon

Episode chronology
← Previous "Showtime"	Next → "The Killer in Me"
- Buffy the Vampire Slayer season 7

"Potential" is the twelfth episode of the seventh and final season of the television show Buffy the Vampire Slayer. The episode aired on January 21, 2003 on UPN.

It appears Dawn is a Potential vampire Slayer; Buffy leaves four Potentials alone with a vampire for them to fight; Dawn confronts a vampire with her classmate Amanda.

== Plot ==
Buffy and Spike bring the Potential Slayers to the cemetery to train for vampire attacks. Buffy and Spike show signs of reawakening their feelings for each other.

At the high school, student Amanda comes to Buffy for counseling. At home, Buffy learns from Willow that another Potential Slayer has been found, already in Sunnydale.

Willow performs a spell that will locate the Potential Slayer and it indicates Dawn. Overhearing a conversation between Willow and Xander, feeling the weight of their concerns and her potential fate of death, she sneaks out the window.

Buffy and Spike take the girls to a demon bar to explain the art of getting information out of the demonic patrons there. They run into the friendly demon Clem. Buffy and Spike show the girls a crypt, find a vampire, and leave them alone to fight it.

While walking alone outside, Dawn runs into Amanda, who says she was attacked by a vampire in a classroom. Having heard rumors about Buffy, Amanda was going to ask for her help, but Dawn volunteers to take care of the problem. They break into the school and are trapped by the vampire. Dawn acts resourcefully and enheartens Amanda to fight. Willow, Xander, and Anya find that Dawn has gone, and Willow rushes to do a spell to find her.

Bringers of the First Evil appear on the scene to snatch the Potential Slayer, and Dawn realizes it is Amanda. Xander arrives at the school with Buffy and Spike as the Bringers attack. Amanda stakes the vampire while Buffy and Spike finish off the Bringers.

While Buffy takes the other girls down to the basement for training, Xander catches on to Dawn's disappointment about not being a Potential. Xander confides in her how hard it is for him to be the powerless member of the gang. He reminds her that she does not need to be special with powers as she is "extraordinary" just the way she is. In return, Dawn suggests that he does have a power – his ability to notice what is really going on with the people he loves, despite the barriers.

== Reception ==
Vox, ranking it at #65 of all 144 episodes on their "Worst to Best" list, writes, "Dawn was always a tough character for Buffy to deal with. Yes, season five was built entirely around her, but the show's final two seasons could never figure out how to balance her teenage self against the increasingly adult stories swirling around the other characters. This is perhaps the finest post-season five Dawn hour, as she hopes, deeply, that she might be a Slayer, only to slowly realize that's not the case. There were some stories — like living up to an impressive older sibling — Buffy could only tell via Dawn, and it’s a pity it didn’t get to more of them."

In 2023, Rolling Stone, ranked this episode as #96 out of the 144 episodes in honor of the 20th anniversary of the show's ending.
