= Buffy the Vampire Slayer season 7 =

2002-2003 season of Buffy the Vampire Slayer

Buffy the Vampire Slayer
- Season 7
- Region 1 Season 7 DVD cover
- Showrunner: Marti Noxon
- Starring: Sarah Michelle Gellar; Nicholas Brendon; Emma Caulfield; Michelle Trachtenberg; James Marsters; Alyson Hannigan
- No. of episodes: 22

Release
- Original network: UPN
- Original release: September 24, 2002 – May 20, 2003

Season chronology
- ← Previous; Season 6

The seventh and final season of the television series Buffy the Vampire Slayer premiered on September 24, 2002 on UPN and concluded its 22-episode run on May 20, 2003. It maintained its previous timeslot, airing Tuesdays at 8:00 pm ET.

== Plot ==
Season seven deals with the Potential Slayers, normal girls around the world who are candidates to succeed the Slayer upon her death.

It is revealed that Buffy's resurrection caused an instability which allows the First Evil, a spiritual entity that Buffy encountered in the third season, to begin tipping the balance between good and evil. It has inactive Potential Slayers hunted and killed by Caleb, a sinister and misogynistic preacher turned serial killer, who heads a cult called Bringers who worship the First. Inside the Hellmouth it raises an army of Turok-Han, an ancient and powerful sub species of vampire. Caleb later destroys the Watchers' Council's headquarters in London, killing many Watchers, including Quentin Travers.

Dawn begins her sophomore year at high school. Buffy gets a job at the rebuilt Sunnydale High, where she meets the new principal, Robin Wood, a vampire hunter and the son of deceased Slayer, Nikki Wood, who was killed by Spike in New York City many years ago. Buffy also reunites with Willow, who still is working through her emotional rampage in the previous season, and Spike, who earned his soul back but is temporarily driven mad by guilt and regret.

Willow begins to heal emotionally from Tara's death and finds solace with a Potential Slayer named Kennedy. They immediately start dating before Kennedy can fully understand Willow. Their relationship is strained when Willow drains a significant portion of her life force to reopen a portal for Buffy, but they soon reconcile.

Andrew Wells and Jonathan Levinson leave Mexico and return to Sunnydale after the First convinces Andrew to help open the Seal of Danzalthar, which results in the death of Jonathan. Andrew is captured by the Scoobies, who show resentment toward him, but he becomes a committed ally after the First takes Jonathan's form and tries to convince him to kill all the Potentials in the house. Andrew refuses, insisting he's good now, later admitting his guilt about how cruel his betrayal of Jonathan was and disclosing that he does not believe he will survive the forthcoming battle.

Anya and Xander break up for good after a demon named Halfrek gets her to kill a group of frat boys. Buffy and Anya fight while Willow summons D'Hoffryn, who questions Anya. Anya requests that her latest vengeance be reversed. Halfrek is killed and Anya is turned human once more.

Spike is driven mad by the First, and soon it also gains control of him for a time. The First also reveals that Spike killed Robin Wood's mother, sparking a vendetta. Robin makes an attempt on Spike's life. Ironically, this attack frees Spike from his insanity and, regaining his clarity, Spike beats Robin. Buffy finds the injured Robin in his garage and angrily shuns him for attacking Spike. Buffy finds out that Giles was part of the scheme, and becomes angry at him.

Willow helps track the Potentials in Sunnydale and a number of them, brought by Giles, take refuge in Buffy's house. Dawn at first believes herself to be a Potential, but becomes disappointed when she finds that is not the case. Xander cheers her up saying she's anything but ordinary. The now human Anya also returns to the Scooby Gang, and while she and Xander still love each other, they don't get back together.

Later, a fully reformed Faith, having been broken out of prison by Wesley to save Angel, returns to Sunnydale to help fight the First. During Faith's return, the Scoobies and the Potentials begin to question Buffy's leadership skills. Everything goes seemingly well, but when Buffy leads the Potentials to attack Caleb and the Bringers, several girls are killed and Xander loses an eye during the fight. The Scoobies and the Potentials eventually mutiny against her, electing a reluctant Faith as their new leader. Spike, however, stays loyal to Buffy and informs her that he has learned of an ancient weapon, known as the Scythe, that was designed only for the Slayer. They spend the night holding each other, allowing Buffy to finally rest. While Buffy fights Caleb and finds the Scythe, Faith leads the Potentials on a mission in the sewers, only to find they've been tricked as a time bomb explodes. Following the explosion, several Turok-Han attack the survivors. Buffy saves the lives of the remaining Potentials, reconciles with her friends and finally makes peace with Faith.

As the Hellmouth becomes more active, nearly all humans and supernatural creatures flee Sunnydale, turning the town into a ghost town. Buffy and her friends stay behind in an effort to defeat the First. Meanwhile, Xander, at Buffy's request, takes Dawn out of Sunnydale to safety. Also, Principal Wood returns to join the cause and finally accepts Spike.

In the series finale, Dawn adamantly returns to help fight against the First. As she does so, Angel returns to Sunnydale to assist Buffy and ultimately watches while she defeats Caleb. Buffy finally kills Caleb by cutting him with the scythe. Angel brings an amulet (given to him by Wolfram & Hart) to give to Buffy. Angel offers to wear the amulet as it is intended for a champion, but Buffy refuses this, arguing that she will need Angel to form a second line of defense if Sunnydale falls. Angel confronts Buffy about her relationship with Spike, and Buffy admits that he is in her heart. She tells him that she needs some time to grow on her own, and denies Angel's advances. Referencing his immortality, Angel comments that he “isn’t getting any older”, before bidding her farewell.

Buffy returns with the amulet and decides to give it to Spike, naming him her champion. They spend their remaining night together. While Caleb is dead, they make their move to thwart the First's plans once and for all. The Potentials descend into the Hellmouth to fight an army of Turok-Han, while the other Scoobies hold off the few Turok-Han that escape into the halls of Sunnydale High. Willow uses a spell that activates all the Potential Slayers, granting them some Slayer powers. Anya is killed in the fight, along with some of the new Slayers. Fearing she is done for, the First returns to taunt Buffy, saying her fight is in vain. Refusing to let the world be destroyed, Buffy and her allies dig deep and begin to gain the upper hand. Spike's amulet channels the power of the sun and kills all of the Turok-Han in the Hellmouth, but Spike himself is also consumed and he sacrifices himself to defeat the enemy. In their final moments, Buffy begs Spike to come with her. Their joined hands symbolically catch fire. Buffy confesses to Spike that she loves him; he replies “No you don’t, but thanks for saying it.” Spike tells her to run. The Hellmouth collapses due to the force of the amulet and the resulting crater swallows all of Sunnydale, but Buffy is able to make it out. Buffy catches up with the survivors of the battle, who have escaped on a yellow school bus.

In the last scene of the series, the survivors gather on the rim of Sunnydale's crater. The Scoobies and new Potential Slayers tend to the wounded. Xander mourns Anya's death and is consoled by Andrew. Dawn asks what their next move is and Buffy smiles with a hopeful expression.

== Cast and characters ==
=== Main cast ===
- Sarah Michelle Gellar as Buffy Summers / the First Evil
- Nicholas Brendon as Xander Harris
- Emma Caulfield as Anya Jenkins
- Michelle Trachtenberg as Dawn Summers
- James Marsters as Spike / the First Evil
- Alyson Hannigan as Willow Rosenberg

=== Recurring cast ===
- Tom Lenk as Andrew Wells
- D. B. Woodside as Robin Wood
- Anthony Stewart Head as Rupert Giles
- Iyari Limon as Kennedy
- Sarah Hagan as Amanda
- Felicia Day as Vi
- Indigo as Rona
- Clara Bryant as Molly
- Adam Busch as the First Evil / Warren Mears
- Eliza Dushku as Faith
- Nathan Fillion as Caleb / the First Evil
- Danny Strong as Jonathan Levinson / the First Evil
- Camden Toy as Turok-Han
- Kristy Wu as Chao-Ahn
- Juliet Landau as the First Evil / Drusilla
- Mary Wilcher as Shannon
- Dania Ramirez as Caridad
- David Boreanaz as Angel
- Harry Groener as the First Evil / Mayor Richard Wilkins III
- Lalaine as Chloe / the First Evil
- James C. Leary as Clem
- Kali Rocha as Halfrek
- Azura Skye as Cassie Newton / the First Evil
- Kristine Sutherland as the First Evil / Joyce Summers

=== Guest cast ===
- Elizabeth Anne Allen as Amy Madison
- Sharon Ferguson as First Slayer
- George Hertzberg as the First Evil / Adam
- Clare Kramer as the First Evil / Glory
- Mark Metcalf as the First Evil / the Master
- Andy Umberger as D'Hoffryn
- Harris Yulin as Quentin Travers

== Crew ==
Series creator Joss Whedon served as executive producer, and wrote two episodes – the season premiere and finale – and directed the finale as well. Marti Noxon also served as executive producer and was the showrunner, but only co-wrote one episode. Noxon was originally due to write the penultimate episode of the series, but she was already busy writing a new pilot for Fox. Jane Espenson was promoted to co-executive producer and wrote or co-wrote six episodes. Co-executive producer David Fury wrote three episodes, including directing one of them. Supervising producer Douglas Petrie was promoted to co-executive producer midseason and wrote or co-wrote four episodes, including directing one of them. Rebecca Rand Kirshner was promoted to executive story editor and wrote three episodes. Drew Z. Greenberg was promoted to story editor and wrote three episodes. The only new addition was Drew Goddard, who wrote or co-wrote five episodes.

David Solomon directed the most episodes in the seventh season, directing five episodes and was promoted to co-executive producer. James A. Contner (also co-producer) directed three.

== Episodes ==
No. overall	No. in season	Title	Directed by	Written by	Original release date	Prod. code	U.S. viewers (millions)
123	1	"Lessons"	David Solomon	Joss Whedon	September 24, 2002	7ABB01	4.99
In Sunnydale, Buffy trains Dawn to fight and tells her that slaying is about power. Sunnydale High has just reopened (with Xander working construction and noting the principal's office sits over the Hellmouth), and Dawn starts attending. Buffy finds a talisman in the school and is confronted by a vengeful ghost who warns she failed to protect the girl and will fail Dawn too. Dawn and two other students, Kit Holburn and Carlos Trejo, fall into the school basement and are menaced by three dead students, who claim everyone in Sunnydale dies. Descending to help, Buffy is blocked by the same spirits and instead finds a frail, deranged Spike, who reveals the ghosts are corporeal manifestations tied to the talisman rather than true ghosts or zombies. Guided by this, Buffy arms Dawn, fights off the spirits, and has Xander destroy the talisman, ending the attack. Afterwards, principal Robin Wood, impressed that Buffy got the two troubled students to socialise and go to class, offers her a job as the school's outreach counsellor. Left alone in the basement, Spike speaks to a hallucinated Warren Mears, who morphs in turn into Glory, Adam, Mayor Wilkins, Drusilla, and the Master, the show's past villains, before finally becoming Buffy herself and echoing her earlier line that it is not about right or wrong but about power. In a parallel storyline in Westbury, England, Willow studies magic and meditation under Giles and a coven of Wiccans, still shaken by having killed people and nearly destroyed the world. She has a vision of "the Earth's teeth", the Hellmouth, prompting Giles to remind her that although everything is connected, not every connection is good.
124	2	"Beneath You"	Nick Marck	Douglas Petrie	October 1, 2002	7ABB02	4.97
The gang deals with a giant underground demon; Willow prepares to return home. Spike reveals to Buffy that he has regained his soul.
125	3	"Same Time, Same Place"	James A. Contner	Jane Espenson	October 8, 2002	7ABB03	4.90
A weak and vulnerable Willow returns home but cannot find her friends in Sunnydale. At the same time, they cannot find her, but bodies are being found without skin, and the resemblance to Willow's murder of Warren alarms Buffy and Xander.
126	4	"Help"	Rick Rosenthal	Rebecca Rand Kirshner	October 15, 2002	7ABB04	5.04
Buffy becomes a counselor at Sunnydale High and meets a girl who predicts her own death. Buffy learns that sometimes, whatever you do, you can't always stop bad things from happening. In 2023, Rolling Stone ranked this episode as #73 out of the 144 episodes in honor of the 20th anniversary of the show's ending. It has a higher rating than the similar "Reptile Boy," which ranked #139. The author of the list commented, "An episode centered around a high school student, a wacky cult of demon worshippers wanting to get rich, and Buffy swooping in to save the day. Color me Season One. The difference being that this isn't Season One anymore, and the show has evolved drastically, with Buffy thwarting the cult but losing Cassie afterward. The Scoobies are adults now, and they know the good guys don't always win." In their own list, Vox ranked this episode at #90 out of the 144, calling it "one of the most solid of season seven's high school–themed episodes... a nice, moody revisiting of the themes that early Buffy explored so well."
127	5	"Selfless"	David Solomon	Drew Goddard	October 22, 2002	7ABB05	5.02
Buffy deals with Anyanka after she grants a lethal wish; Anya's background story is also revealed. The two end up fighting, with Xander unsure of where his loyalties lie.
128	6	"Him"	Michael Gershman	Drew Z. Greenberg	November 5, 2002	7ABB06	4.65
Dawn, Buffy, Willow and Anya fall in love with a high school quarterback as a result of a 'magic' jacket. Xander and Spike become reluctant roommates, but try to sort out the confusion. In 2023, Vox ranked it at #107 out of the 144 episodes on their "Worst to Best" list, saying it "isn't all that great on character exploration, since half the main cast spends the episode under a mind-altering love spell, but it is enormously fun." Rolling Stone ranked the episode at #87 out of the 144 episodes in honor of the 20th anniversary of the show's ending: "It's not consequential in the final season, but it's much-needed levity in an otherwise heavy Season Seven." Billie Doux, in a mixed review, called it very "funny, frothy, and well written. ... Michelle Trachtenberg showed some serious range." Reviewer Noel Murray called it "fairly inconsequential" but added, "The staging of the last act of 'Him' is pretty crackerjack, with the four ladies' schemes taking place first in split-screen and then in a series of boffo gags." Dan Owen, awarding it 3 out of 5 stars, thought it "an enjoyable hour of BtVS, which got better once the fundamental issue started to grow in complexity. ... I think this episode wasn't as funny as it thought it was," but its "silly, charming moments... held this amusing episode together." Entertainment Weekly praises Trachtenberg's "dramatic and comedic potential" and the "tongue-in-cheek storytelling" — "with split-screen action backed by a '70s soundtrack and the pairing of reluctant partners Spike and Xander," all in all voting it a hilarious episode.
129	7	"Conversations with Dead People"	Nick Marck	Jane Espenson & Drew Goddard	November 12, 2002	7ABB07	4.83
Buffy, Dawn, and Willow face individual encounters with familiar faces from their past. Also, Jonathan and Andrew return to Sunnydale to unearth a mysterious symbol.
130	8	"Sleeper"	Alan J. Levi	David Fury & Jane Espenson	November 19, 2002	7ABB08	5.03
Buffy probes a series of grisly murders that may be the work of Spike. In 2023, Rolling Stone, ranked this episode as #93 out of the 144 episodes in honor of 20th anniversary of the show ending.
131	9	"Never Leave Me"	David Solomon	Drew Goddard	November 26, 2002	7ABB09	4.83
The Summers' home gains two captives: Spike and Andrew. The Watchers Council is attacked directly by an agent of the First.
132	10	"Bring on the Night"	David Grossman	Marti Noxon & Douglas Petrie	December 17, 2002	7ABB10	4.79
Giles arrives with three apprentice Slayers; the Scoobies research the First; Buffy fights an ancient vampire named Turok-Han.
133	11	"Showtime"	Michael Grossman	David Fury	January 7, 2003	7ABB11	4.08
Buffy must win the confidence of Potential Slayers and kill the Turok-Han. Vox, ranking it at #76 of all 144 episodes on their "Worst to Best" list, writes, "'Showtime' features one of Buffy's strongest inspirational speeches, delivered mid-Thunderdome-style beatdown on a Turok-Han. It's a solid action set piece that goes a long way toward relieving the monotony of mid-season seven, and Buffy's telepathic conversation with Willow and Xander helps recenter the show's focus on their friendship in the middle of a season of growing distance." In 2023, Rolling Stone, ranked this episode as #76 out of the 144 episodes in honor of 20th anniversary of the show ending.
134	12	"Potential"	James A. Contner	Rebecca Rand Kirshner	January 21, 2003	7ABB12	3.61
Buffy and Spike establish a boot camp to prepare the Potential Slayers for combat, while a spell from Willow reveals another Potential in Sunnydale. Dawn thinks it may be her for a short while, but then the true Potential is revealed.
135	13	"The Killer in Me"	David Solomon	Drew Z. Greenberg	February 4, 2003	7ABB13	3.46
After sharing a lingering kiss with would-be Slayer Kennedy, Willow bafflingly transforms into Warren and must confront the loss of Tara. When Spike's chip begins to malfunction, he and Buffy take a trip to the Initiative stomping grounds, where they meet up with a few remaining soldiers who give her a choice of how to deal with the problem. Meanwhile, when Giles takes the Potentials on a self discovery quest, the rest of the gang find clues that lead them to believe Giles may be the First Evil.
136	14	"First Date"	David Grossman	Jane Espenson	February 11, 2003	7ABB14	4.24
Buffy accepts a dinner invitation from Principal Wood; Anya is jealous when Xander has a date, but it turns out to not be so innocent. Actress and stunt double April Weeden-Washington, who played the original "Subway Slayer" Nikki Wood, told an interviewer, didn't get the part for this character; K.D. Aubert replaced her. Vox, ranking it at #123 of all 144 episodes on their "Worst to Best" list, noting that this quiet episode has its charms. It brings back a little of the Scooby camaraderie that made the early seasons so fun. In 2023, Rolling Stone, ranked this episode as #99 out of the 144 episodes in honor of the 20th anniversary of the show's ending. Mark Oshiro wrote a mixed review, finding some of the jokes cheap, and the character of Chao-Ahn, "an awful, gross stereotype taken to extremely racist/xenophobic ends." While he liked the appearance of Ashanti as Lissa, he asks whether "this episode sort of criticizes itself?"
137	15	"Get It Done"	Douglas Petrie	Douglas Petrie	February 18, 2003	7ABB15	3.43
Buffy learns more about the First Slayer and the source of power.
138	16	"Storyteller"	Marita Grabiak	Jane Espenson	February 25, 2003	7ABB16	3.63
Andrew records his own melodramatic documentary of Buffy's fight against evil, interviewing the household and quietly distorting events to flatter himself. At school, Buffy finds chaos, including a fight, a girl turning invisible from unpopularity, and Principal Wood injured by a thrown rock; while bandaging him, she connects the disturbances to the newly uncovered Seal of Danzalthar in the basement, and when Wood gets close to it he is briefly possessed, taunting her over Spike before being pulled free with no memory of it. Back home, Andrew's interviews push Xander and Anya to confront their feelings for each other, before Wood and Buffy recruit him to help close the seal. A forced memory reveals the knife the First had wanted him to use on Jonathan, and the group heads to the rioting school, where Spike and Wood hold the stairs while Buffy and Andrew fight through to the basement. There, Buffy kills the newly self-blinded Bringers, then tells Andrew that his blood is needed to close the seal since he was the one who opened it; as he breaks down confessing his guilt over killing Jonathan, she reveals that it was actually his tears, not blood, that closed the seal, and that she never meant to kill him, leaving his question about whether she would have unanswered. Alone in the bathroom again, a chastened Andrew tells the camera he probably deserves to die, then switches it off.
139	17	"Lies My Parents Told Me"	David Fury	David Fury & Drew Goddard	March 25, 2003	7ABB17	3.44
The gang investigates Spike's trigger; Principal Wood and Giles decide to eliminate Spike without Buffy's knowledge or approval, but fail. Buffy confronts them.
140	18	"Dirty Girls"	Michael Gershman	Drew Goddard	April 15, 2003	7ABB18	3.31
Faith returns to Sunnydale; a new powerful evil face appears, Caleb, a former priest who is unstoppable and works for the First; Buffy leads the troops into battle. Xander loses his eye to Caleb and some of the Potentials are killed by him.
141	19	"Empty Places"	James A. Contner	Drew Z. Greenberg	April 29, 2003	7ABB19	3.60
As the residents of Sunnydale evacuate, and the Potentials suffer many casualties, Buffy loses the trust of the group and is forced out of the house. Faith becomes the leader.
142	20	"Touched"	David Solomon	Rebecca Rand Kirshner	May 6, 2003	7ABB20	4.02
A depressed Buffy is comforted by Spike; Willow and Kennedy become intimate, as do Faith and Principal Wood. Anya and Xander rekindle their spark. The Scoobies capture and interrogate a Bringer; Faith decides on a plan, but it doesn't go smoothly.
143	21	"End of Days"	Marita Grabiak	Douglas Petrie & Jane Espenson	May 13, 2003	7ABB21	4.06
Buffy finds an ancient battleaxe called the Scythe in the cave and faces off with Caleb; an old ally Angel returns to Sunnydale to help.
144	22	"Chosen"	Joss Whedon	Joss Whedon	May 20, 2003	7ABB22	4.87
Buffy talks to Angel about the future. Buffy and the Scooby Gang devise a plan to launch an all-out assault against the First. They all descend on the Hellmouth, as Willow uses a spell on the Scythe to turn the Potential Slayers into actual Slayers and they engage in a vicious battle against thousands of Ubervamps. Spike uses the amulet Angel brought from L.A. and brings about the end of Sunnydale, and the Hellmouth. Buffy is able to escape the crumbling Hellmouth and reunites with the gang.

=== Crossovers with Angel ===
The seventh and final season of Buffy the Vampire Slayer coincided with the fourth season of Angel. This was the final year in which both shows were on television together.

In "Lies My Parents Told Me", Willow (Alyson Hannigan) receives a call from Fred. She leaves immediately and goes to L.A. without telling why. Willow appears in the Angel episode "Orpheus" to re-ensoul Angel (David Boreanaz) as she previously did before in "Becoming". After successfully re-ensouling Angel, she brings Faith (Eliza Dushku) back with her to Sunnydale to help in the fight against the First Evil.

In the Angel season four finale, "Home", Angel receives an amulet from Wolfram & Hart which is important to the final battle in Sunnydale. Angel goes to Sunnydale in the penultimate episode "End of Days" and also appears in the series finale "Chosen". Angel gives Buffy the amulet (which is later worn by Spike in the final battle) and offers his help, but Buffy declines as she needs him to be the second front if they fail. Buffy and Angel share one final moment in a graveyard where they discuss a possible future.

In the fifth and final season of Angel, Spike is resurrected (after his death in "Chosen") by the magical amulet. Spike becomes a main character in the fifth season. Harmony Kendall (Mercedes McNab) also becomes a main character in the fifth season. Buffy recurring character Andrew Wells (Tom Lenk) appears in two episodes ("Damage" and "The Girl in Question") in the final season of Angel, revealed to be a Watcher-in-training. Andrew states in "Damage" that Xander is in Africa, Willow and Kennedy are in Brazil, Buffy and Dawn are in Rome, and everyone else is in England.

== Reception ==
The series received a Primetime Emmy Award nomination for Outstanding Special Visual Effects for a Series for "Chosen". While, "Chosen" won for Outstanding Visual Effects in a Television Series at the Visual Effects Society Awards.

"Conversations with Dead People" won a Hugo Award for Best Dramatic Presentation – Short Form, while "Chosen" was nominated in the same category.

The series received the Television Critics Association Heritage Award.

The Futon Critic named "Conversations with Dead People" the 42nd best episode of 2002 and "Chosen" the 50th best episode of 2003.

The seventh season averaged 4.1 million viewers. Rotten Tomatoes gave season seven a score of 82% with an average rating of 8.30 out of 10 based on 22 reviews with a critics consensus stating, "Seldom subtle, always subversive, Buffy ends the way it began: a funny, weird show that packs a punch and a whole lot of feeling."

== Canonical comic book continuation ==
In late 2006, series creator Joss Whedon announced that a canonical comic book continuation of the series would be written. The comic book, titled Buffy the Vampire Slayer Season Eight, is published by Dark Horse Comics; and the first issue (written by Whedon), titled "The Long Way Home" was released on March 14, 2007.

The storyline picks up after the end of the final episode with the Scooby Gang in Europe and Buffy in charge of all the new Slayers. Most of the characters from the television series appear in the comic book series.

Out of the 40 issues of Season Eight, Whedon wrote 17 issues and oversaw all other issues as "executive producer". Other Buffy television writers that have written issues include Jane Espenson (6 issues), Drew Goddard (4 issues), Steven S. DeKnight (1 issue), Drew Z. Greenberg (1 issue) and Doug Petrie (1 issue).

The comic book series continued with Buffy the Vampire Slayer Season Nine in September 2011, Buffy the Vampire Slayer Season Ten in March 2014, Buffy the Vampire Slayer Season Eleven in November 2016, and concluded with Buffy the Vampire Slayer Season Twelve in June 2018.

A graphic novel (canon status not certain) set during the seventh season of the show, Spike: Into the Light, written by James Marsters, was released by Dark Horse Comics on July 16, 2014.

== Home media ==
Buffy the Vampire Slayer: The Complete Seventh Season was released on DVD in region 1 on November 16, 2004 and in region 2 on April 5, 2004. The DVD includes all 22 episodes on 6 discs presented in full frame 1.33:1 aspect ratio (region 1) and in anamorphic widescreen 1.78:1 aspect ratio (region 2 and 4). Special features on the DVD include seven commentary tracks—"Lessons" by writer Joss Whedon and director David Solomon; "Conversations with Dead People" by writers Jane Espenson and Drew Goddard, director Nick Marck, and actors Danny Strong and Tom Lenk; "Selfless" by writer Drew Goddard and director David Solomon; "The Killer in Me" by writer Drew Z. Greenberg and director David Solomon; "Lies My Parents Told Me" by co-writer/director David Fury, co-writer Drew Goddard, and actors James Marsters and D. B. Woodside; "Dirty Girls" by writer Drew Goddard and actor Nicholas Brendon; and "Chosen" by writer and director Joss Whedon. Featurettes include, "Buffy: It's Always Been About the Fans", which details the fandom of the series; "Buffy 101: Studying the Slayer" showcases interviews with television critics and scholars discussing the themes of the show; "Generation S" showcases interviews with the "Slayerettes" introduced in the season; "The Last Sundown" has Joss Whedon list his favorite episodes and comments on the show; "Buffy wraps" features interviews with cast and crew at the series wrap party; and "Season 7 Overview – Buffy: Full Circle", a 36-minute featurette where cast and crew members discuss the season. Also included are series outtakes and DVD-ROM content.
