= Dirty Girls =

- Buffy the Vampire Slayer episode
- Episode no.: Season 7 Episode 18
- Directed by: Michael Gershman
- Written by: Drew Goddard
- Production code: 7ABB18
- Original air date: April 15, 2003

Guest appearances
- Anthony Stewart Head as Rupert Giles; Eliza Dushku as Faith; Nathan Fillion as Caleb; Tom Lenk as Andrew Wells; Iyari Limon as Kennedy; Indigo as Rona; Clara Bryant as Molly; Sarah Hagan as Amanda; Kristy Wu as Chao-Ahn; D. B. Woodside as Principal Robin Wood; Mary Wilcher as Shannon; Dania Ramirez as Caridad; Rachel Bilson as Colleen; Carrie Southworth as Betty; Christie Abbott as Helpless Girl

Episode chronology
| ← Previous "Lies My Parents Told Me" | Next → "Empty Places" |
- Buffy the Vampire Slayer season 7

"Dirty Girls" is the 18th episode of the seventh and final season of the television series Buffy the Vampire Slayer. The episode aired on April 15, 2003, on UPN.

== Plot ==
A young Potential Slayer, Shannon, is chased through the woods by Bringers. She accepts the assistance of a stranger wearing a priest's collar and driving a truck but is horrified to discover that she has fallen into a trap. The man, who introduces himself as Caleb, terrifies her and burns his mark into her neck. He gives her a message for the Slayer (which the viewer does not hear at this time), stabs her in the stomach, and forces her out of the car. Minutes later, Faith and Willow find the girl on their way back to Sunnydale after re-ensouling Angel in Los Angeles and take her to the hospital, where Faith asks Willow why the Scooby Gang failed to warn her about the threat of the Bringers. Faith subsequently encounters Spike chasing a young woman and mistakenly believes Spike is evil again. The young woman, now in her vampire form, attacks Faith who, borrowing a stake from Buffy, quickly slays her.

Back at the house, Faith encounters a cold reception from both Dawn and Giles, and Spike explains that the tension is not all because of her. Meanwhile, the First Evil reveals Buffy's form to Caleb who is residing in the basement of a winery. The next day, while Faith is training in the backyard, Andrew brings the Potentials up to speed on her history, and they are fascinated by the fact that there are two active Slayers. At Sunnydale High School, Principal Wood calls Buffy into his office where he fires her from her school job, emphasizing the need for her to focus on the mission.

Alarmed by the obsession over her at the Summers' home, Faith sneaks down into the basement for a cigarette break, where Spike joins her. The two talk and bond over their respective periods of being dangerous. Faith reveals they met once before years ago when Faith was in Buffy's body, and Spike reveals that he and Buffy had been more than just friends at one point. Buffy, having arrived home after leaving the school, comes down and seems a bit unnerved at seeing the two of them together. Dawn calls down that Willow has reported from the hospital: Shannon is awake. Buffy goes to the hospital, where Shannon tells Buffy of Caleb's message: he has something of Buffy's.

Later at the house, Buffy tries to motivate the terrified Potentials to accompany her when she attacks Caleb (who, meanwhile, is re-enacting scenes of his past murders with the First Evil). Buffy alone is confident in her plan; Giles, Spike, her friends, and the Potentials all question her decision. Buffy and Faith, on a recon mission, follow a Bringer through the woods. They discuss Faith's intentions and her recent experiences with Angel before locating Caleb's stronghold in an old winery.

At the Summers' home, Xander directs the Potentials on the methods of attacking in battle. When Rona criticizes Buffy's intentions, Xander strongly defends his friend. Leaving Willow and Giles to stay behind to protect the more inexperienced girls, Buffy leads Spike, Faith, Xander, and the more experienced Potentials (including Kennedy, Molly, Rona, Chao-Ahn, Amanda, Diane, and several others) to the vineyard; they divide into two groups: an assault team and a back-up team. After an initial clash with the Bringers, Caleb appears. Possessing super-strength, he quickly knocks Buffy and Spike aside, and breaks Rona's arm. Xander and Faith arrive with the back-up team, but Faith is soon knocked unconscious. Caleb kills Diane and Molly, and Buffy orders a retreat after managing to knock Caleb down. Xander starts to yell that everyone needs to get out, but he himself is soon attacked by Caleb, who proceeds to stab his thumb into Xander's eye. Spike tackles Caleb, giving them enough time to get Xander and leave the vineyard.

Alone and distraught, Buffy leaves the injured girls and walks through the empty streets as Caleb tells the First, in Buffy's form, that their victory is imminent.

== Reception ==
In 2023, Rolling Stone, ranked this episode as #50 out of the 144 episodes in honor of the 20th anniversary of the show's ending.
