= Chosen (Buffy the Vampire Slayer) =

- Buffy the Vampire Slayer episode
- Episode no.: Season 7 Episode 22
- Directed by: Joss Whedon
- Written by: Joss Whedon
- Production code: 7ABB22
- Original air date: May 20, 2003

Guest appearances
- Anthony Stewart Head as Rupert Giles; Eliza Dushku as Faith Lehane; Nathan Fillion as Caleb/The First; David Boreanaz as Angel; Tom Lenk as Andrew Wells; Iyari Limon as Kennedy; Sarah Hagan as Amanda; Indigo as Rona; D. B. Woodside as Principal Robin Wood; Felicia Day as Vi; Mary Wilcher as Shannon; Demetra Raven as Girl at Bat; Katie Gray as Indian Girl; Lisa Ann Cabasa as Injured Girl; Ally Matsumura as Japanese Girl; Kelly Wheeler as School Girl; Jenna Edwards as Trailer Girl; Julia Ling as Potential with Power #2

Episode chronology
← Previous "End of Days"	Next → "Buffy the Vampire Slayer Season Eight"
- Buffy the Vampire Slayer season 7

"Chosen" is the series finale of the American television series Buffy the Vampire Slayer. It is the 22nd episode of the seventh season and the 144th episode of the series overall. It was both written and directed by series creator Joss Whedon, and originally aired on UPN on May 20, 2003. The Buffy story would not be continued beyond this point until "The Long Way Home", a comic book, in 2007 and the Buffy and Angel saga would end in the Season Twelve series in late 2018.

== Plot ==
A bloody Caleb rises and Buffy finally kills him with the scythe by slicing him in two from the crotch up. Angel has brought an amulet intended to be worn by someone ensouled, yet more than human. He offers to fight alongside her, but she declines, asking him to instead organize a second front in case she loses to the First Evil. They discuss Spike, his soul, and Buffy's feelings for him, with Angel clearly unsettled and jealous. When Angel asks whether or not he has a place in her future, Buffy explains that she still needs to grow up; a future for them will be a long time coming, if ever. Accepting this, Angel walks into the shadows, just like on the night they first met. As all this occurs, Spike watches unseen, with the First in Buffy's form by his side.

Back at the house, Dawn angrily kicks Buffy in the shin for having Xander try to take her away from Sunnydale. Spike is in the basement, working out his anger on a punching bag with a crude drawing of Angel's face on it. He asks for the amulet, and she explains that it is very powerful and meant only for a champion. She then hands it to him. When Buffy tells Spike coyly that Faith is still sleeping in her room, he is reluctant to have her stay downstairs with him since she kissed Angel, but gives in. Late at night, as Buffy and Spike are sleeping in each other's arms, the First appears to taunt Buffy in the form of Caleb, and then in the form of Buffy herself. Its words give Buffy a plan; when Spike wakes up, Buffy tells him that she now knows that they will win.

The next morning, Buffy unveils her plan to the Potential Slayers off-camera. Afterward, Willow expresses to Kennedy her concerns about using magic again. She says this is the most powerful magic she will have attempted and asks Kennedy to kill her if it turns bad. Faith and Principal Wood also have a discussion while preparing the school for the battle. Wood demonstrates that he understands her defensiveness over getting emotionally involved with men and asks her to give him a chance after the battle. During the night, Buffy goes to the basement, where she apparently spends her last night with Spike.

The next morning, everyone arrives at Sunnydale High in a yellow school bus. The Slayers and the Potentials head to the seal in the basement while Kennedy helps Willow set up her spell in Wood's office, Andrew is paired with Anya, Dawn leaves to set up her post with Xander, and Wood leaves to wait at his post for Giles. The core four share a moment talking about going to the mall after saving the world which leads Giles to say, "The earth is definitely doomed." Xander and Willow walk down the hallway with Buffy before each one peels off, leaving Buffy walking alone to the seal. The Potentials, Faith and Spike are waiting, and the Potentials cut their hands to open the seal with their blood. They climb down the hole in the ground and come face to face with the army of Turok-Han, who launch an attack.

Willow sits in the school principal's office directly above the Seal, the scythe before her. While chanting a spell, she places her hands on the scythe, and both she and the weapon light up in an ethereal glow and her hair turns white, the opposite of Dark Willow. A flashback to Buffy's final speech to the Potentials reveals that Willow is channeling the essence of the scythe in order to activate Potentials all over the world. Defying the tradition of only one slayer per generation, Willow's spell will raise an army strong enough to do battle with The First. After Willow performs the magic, Kennedy takes the scythe to Buffy, who is deep in the fight with Faith and Spike against the army of the Turok-Han, numbering in the thousands.

As she pauses to give orders, Buffy is stabbed through her abdomen from behind by a Turok-Han and falls to the ground. She passes the scythe to Faith and asks her to hold the line. As she lies on the ground, she sees several Slayers fall, including Amanda. In the halls of the school, a few Turok-Han make it to the surface and attack the group guarding the entrances. A small group of Bringers also appear and attack. During the battle, Anya is bisected by a Bringer, Andrew fights until he is overwhelmed, Wood is stabbed by a Bringer who is then killed by Giles, and Xander and Dawn take on some Turok-Han who are disintegrated by sunlight when Dawn throws open a skylight window, but more follow. In the Hellmouth, the First then appears to Buffy as a mortally wounded Buffy herself, taunting her. Ordering The First to, "get out of my face." Buffy arises with renewed determination and knocks several Turok-Han off the ledge. Other Slayers are reinvigorated as well.

Just then, Spike's amulet consumes him in blue light and blasts a hole upward into the sky. The sunlight is channeled through his soul to the amulet and in powerful rays that begin dusting the Ubervamps. The ground begins to shake and rocks tumble. The few surviving Slayers start to flee. Buffy tells Spike to do so as well, but he insists on finishing it. They share a quiet moment as the world crumbles around them. With tears in her eyes, Buffy tells Spike she loves him (as predicted by Cassie months earlier); Spike dismisses her declaration but thanks her for it. He orders her to leave as he has to stay and finish the job. While Buffy flees, Spike laughs in triumph and burns to dust as the Hellmouth collapses.

On the way out of the school, Xander yells for Anya, whose body lies nearby unseen as Dawn pulls him out. The survivors board a school bus and flee. Buffy runs across rooftops to catch up, and leaps onto the top of the bus. The entire town of Sunnydale collapses into the Hellmouth cavern, leaving a large crater. With the bus having stopped nearby, Andrew comforts Xander by telling him that Anya died saving his life. While a few of the new Slayers tend to the wounded, the other survivors look back at the crater's rim. As Willow and Dawn ponder what to do next, Buffy slowly begins to smile, knowing that she is no longer alone in the world and that the burden of being the one chosen Slayer is no longer on her shoulders.

== Production details ==
Originally the series finale was planned as a two-hour event. However, UPN only ordered 22 episodes instead of the required 23. This was why stories were so rushed at the end, according to Gellar.

=== Writing ===
- Season seven explores the fundamental separation between the Slayer and other people, which the series finale turns upside down. As J. Lichtenberg points out in her essay on heroism in the Buffyverse, Buffy is a hero because she makes her own rules. "Finally an adult, Buffy rejects the fate laid out for her by the Council of Watchers and a couple of old men millennia ago," Lichtenberg writes. "She finally achieves her goal of normality - not by changing her own nature, but by making others like her."
- In a BBC interview before this episode aired, writer/director Joss Whedon said, "If nobody cries... then I've definitely failed. It's really emotional - you're supposed to laugh, cry and gasp with excitement - as well as take away a beautiful feminist message." He acknowledges that the magic unleashed from the scythe in this episode is "somewhat convenient" and that the Turok-Han vampires are far easier to kill in this episode than in previous episodes (in which Anya noted their tough chest bones make staking them extremely difficult), but as a writer, it was more important for him to get to the show's message of empowerment by showing what Willow's magic and Buffy's status as the Slayer means to each of them.
- As opposed to Spike's "perfect, noble" death, Whedon wanted another character to die in a "real middle-of-the-battle death" and to have it done "brutally and suddenly and never really pay it off". Emma Caulfield stated at the beginning of season 7 that this would be her last season on Buffy, even if the show was renewed for another season, and so Caulfield was fine with having Anya be the character who was killed.
- In the DVD commentary, Whedon says that he wanted Angel to exit the show exactly like he entered, backing out into the darkness behind him.

== Reception ==
"Chosen" attracted 4.9 million viewers on its original run. SFX, a British sci-fi magazine, listed "Chosen" the 8th best episode of Buffy (number one was "Hush").

The episode was nominated for both a 2003 Emmy Award in the Category of Special Visual Effects for a Series, and for the 2004 Hugo Award for Best Dramatic Presentation, Short Form.

The Futon Critic named it the 50th best episode of 2003, saying "the final Buffy from Joss Whedon's pen was a reason to celebrate in 2003: back was the snappy dialogue we've come to expect from the show over the years. In essence the show came to life just as its run drew to a close. Not a bad way to go out."

In May 2013, Entertainment Weekly named "Chosen" as number nine on their list of 20 Best TV Series Finales Ever. The L.A. Times also named the episode number 13 as their most memorable TV series finales.

Screen Rant named it an episode including some of "The Best 60 Seconds From All 7 Seasons," saying the show's "most rousing and goosebump-inducing 60-second sequence ever plays out, as powerful music plays over Buffy's inspiring words. Potentials worldwide, including Buffy's army, become slayers, turning the tables in the fight against the First Evil."
