= Lies My Parents Told Me =

- Buffy the Vampire Slayer episode
- Episode no.: Season 7 Episode 17
- Directed by: David Fury
- Written by: David Fury; Drew Goddard
- Production code: 7ABB17
- Original air date: March 25, 2003

Guest appearances
- Anthony Stewart Head as Rupert Giles; Tom Lenk as Andrew Wells; Iyari Limon as Kennedy; Indigo as Rona; Caroline Lagerfelt as Anne; K. D. Aubert as Nikki Wood; D. B. Woodside as Principal Robin Wood; Damani Roberts as Young Robin; Ira Steck as New Vamp

Episode chronology
| ← Previous "Storyteller" | Next → "Dirty Girls" |
- Buffy the Vampire Slayer season 7

"Lies My Parents Told Me" is the 17th episode in the seventh and final season of the television show Buffy the Vampire Slayer. It was originally intended to air on March 18, 2003, a day before the Angel episode "Orpheus", but was postponed due to the start of the Iraq War. The episode aired on March 25, 2003 on UPN. The gang investigates Spike's trigger; Principal Wood and Giles team up without Buffy.

== Plot ==
In New York in 1977, Spike fights Nikki Wood, a Slayer whom he will eventually kill, in a park at night in pouring rain while her son Robin watches from his hiding place behind a bench. Spike has the opportunity to kill her but Robin distracts him and he lets her go, vowing that they will meet again. When he leaves, a clearly troubled Nikki finds her son and calms his fears by telling him, "The mission is what matters."

In present-day Sunnydale, Buffy, Principal Robin Wood, and Spike are fighting a bunch of vampires in an alley. Buffy and Spike manage to kill their quarry, but a vampire knocks Wood to the ground, and is about to kill him. Spike saves Wood by killing the vampire from behind, then helps him up, telling him not to hold back with using the stake. Wood thanks him, but he grips onto the stake so hard his hand starts dripping blood.

Previously, the First Evil had programmed Spike with a post-hypnotic suggestion in his mind that allows it to turn Spike violent using an old song, "Early One Morning", as a trigger. This way the First was able to command him to kill again. Buffy wants to find out how to turn it off so that she can fully trust Spike against the First, but Giles opposes Buffy, believing that Spike is still dangerous and must be contained or disposed of.

At the same time, the Scoobies go to Buffy's basement, where Willow makes a spell with the Prokaryote stone, a magical artifact that penetrates Spike's mind and makes him more conscious of how the trigger works. During this process information about Spike's human past is revealed, including how he turned his sick mother into a vampire only to be rejected by her newly vampiric self. The song that his mother used to sing makes him relive the whole episode and switch into his evil, soulless self. He unwittingly hurts Dawn in the process and scares them all, except Buffy. Meanwhile, Willow receives a phone call from a girl named Fred and quickly leaves for Los Angeles, promising Buffy she will be back as soon as she can.

After the previous incident, Wood and Giles privately conspire to get Spike killed. When Giles learns that Spike had killed Wood's mother, the two plan for Giles to distract Buffy while Wood takes care of Spike. Giles takes Buffy on patrol and begins asking her indirect questions and making obscure references to her role against the First. In the meantime, Wood takes Spike to his hideout where he reveals that he knows Spike murdered his mother and that he is going to kill the monster inside him. Spike says he has no remorse over killing Wood's mother. Wood then plays "Early One Morning", which triggers Spike's violent, monstrous self and the two fight. As the fight progresses, Spike continues to relive the events that transpired between him and his mother, due to the Prokaryote Stone. Wood takes advantage of Spike's flashbacks, and using weapons, knocks Spike around until he cannot stand and he then attempts to stake him.

At this point, Spike regains control of his own mind, having faced his own anger and regret on turning his mother into a vampire and then being forced to kill her. Wood is now almost helpless against the much stronger Spike, who gives him a violent beating, demonstrates that the song has no more power over him and points out the difference between their own mothers – Spike's mother actually loved him back, but Nikki only cared about the mission. While Giles and Buffy are talking in the cemetery, they are ambushed by another vampire. Buffy realizes that Giles has been trying to distract her while Wood kills Spike. She kills the vampire and rushes to Wood's place, where she finds Spike and a badly injured but alive Wood. Spike tells her that he stopped himself from killing Wood, but only because he had already killed Wood's mother. Buffy tells Wood that she needs Spike alive and that she has no time for personal vendettas, and vows to let Spike kill him if he tries anything like this again. As she walks away, she says she has a mission to win this war - "The mission is what matters" - echoing Wood's mother's words when he was a child. Once at home, Buffy tells Giles that his and Wood's plan failed, and disowns him as her mentor.

== Reception ==
In 2023, Rolling Stone, ranked this episode as #37 out of the 144 episodes in honor of 20th anniversary of the show ending.
