= Empty Places =

- Buffy the Vampire Slayer episode
- Episode no.: Season 7 Episode 19
- Directed by: James A. Contner
- Written by: Drew Z. Greenberg
- Production code: 7ABB19
- Original air date: April 29, 2003

Guest appearances
- Anthony Stewart Head as Rupert Giles; Eliza Dushku as Faith; Nathan Fillion as Caleb; Tom Lenk as Andrew Wells; Iyari Limon as Kennedy; Indigo as Rona; Sarah Hagan as Amanda; Kristy Wu as Chao-Ahn; D. B. Woodside as Principal Robin Wood; Dorian Missick as Police Officer; Larry Clarke as The Monk; Mary Wilcher as Shannon; James C. Leary as Clem; Justin Shilton as Munroe; Nathan Brooks Burgess as Duncan; David Grammar as Crazy Citizen

Episode chronology
← Previous "Dirty Girls"	Next → "Touched"
- Buffy the Vampire Slayer season 7

"Empty Places" is the 19th episode of the seventh and final season of the television series Buffy the Vampire Slayer. The episode aired on April 29, 2003 on UPN.

== Plot ==
The citizens of Sunnydale flee en masse to escape the Hellmouth and Sunnydale becomes a ghost town. Buffy spots Clem in his car on his way out; he urges her to leave town for this particular apocalypse.

Giles and Willow go to get information from the police on Caleb, with Willow using mind control to convince the officer that they are with Interpol. Spike and Andrew leave to pursue a lead. They discover an engraving on a plaque that states that the power they are searching for is to be wielded by "her" alone. At the deserted school, Buffy is confronted by Caleb, who grabs her by the neck and throws her through a window into a wall, rendering her unconscious. After she awakens, Buffy returns home to discover that Faith has taken Dawn and the Potentials to The Bronze for a night of relaxation.

At The Bronze, the girls run into trouble with the police, who threaten to kill or injure Faith, and briefly hold Dawn and the Potentials hostage. Buffy confronts the group, saving the girls, and demands that they make better choices, before revealing her plans for another attack. At this point, the Potentials, as well as Dawn, Willow, Xander, Anya, Giles, and Principal Wood, tell Buffy that they no longer trust her leadership. At Dawn's request, Buffy leaves the house and Faith reluctantly becomes the new leader.

== Continuity ==
This episode is the final appearance of the night club "The Bronze", which had appeared regularly since the first episode. The band playing there is Nerf Herder, who wrote and performed the show's theme music throughout: their connection to the series was further acknowledged by this dialogue:

Kennedy: "What kind of band plays during an apocalypse?"
Dawn: "I think this band might actually be one of the signs."

== Reception ==
When it first aired, Nielson Ratings reported that "Empty Places" attracted an audience of 2.3 million.

In 2023, Rolling Stone ranked every episode of the series, in honor of the 20th anniversary of the show ending. This episode was ranked as number 136 out of the 144 episodes, described as "a real low point in Season Seven".
