= Touched (Buffy the Vampire Slayer) =

- Buffy the Vampire Slayer episode
- Episode no.: Season 7 Episode 20
- Directed by: David Solomon
- Written by: Rebecca Rand Kirshner
- Production code: 7ABB20
- Original air date: May 6, 2003

Guest appearances
- Anthony Stewart Head as Rupert Giles; Eliza Dushku as Faith; Nathan Fillion as Caleb; Tom Lenk as Andrew Wells; Iyari Limon as Kennedy; Sarah Hagan as Amanda; Harry Groener as The First/Mayor Richard Wilkins; D. B. Woodside as Principal Robin Wood; Felicia Day as Vi; Dania Ramirez as Caridad; Lisa Ann Cabasa as Injured Girl; Lance E. Nichols as Middle-Aged Man

Episode chronology
← Previous "Empty Places"	Next → "End of Days"
- Buffy the Vampire Slayer season 7

"Touched" is the 20th episode of the seventh and final season of the television series Buffy the Vampire Slayer. The episode aired on May 6, 2003 on UPN.

== Plot ==
As the Scoobies and the Potential Slayers argue over what to do next after Buffy's departure, their reluctant newly-elected leader Faith tries to get everyone to agree to go to sleep and reconvene in the morning, when the power goes out due to the utility company workers leaving Sunnydale like most of the townspeople. The group continues to argue, and Faith suggests the Bringers are the weakest link among their enemies, so they should capture one and interrogate him. When Spike returns from his mission with Andrew, he is enraged to find that the Scooby Gang have lost faith in Buffy's leadership and evicted her from her home during his absence. He denounces them all as traitors, then storms out in disgust.

The Scoobies capture a Bringer and magically interrogate him. Eyeless and tongueless, he speaks through Andrew, who tells them that Bringers are busy forging weapons for the coming apocalypse and do not see Buffy's army as a threat. Later, after saying goodnight to Giles, Faith is approached by the First Evil in the form of the deceased Mayor, who leads her to believe that Buffy only sees her as a killer and will take the first chance she gets to kill her.

That evening, four couples engage in intimacy. Spike finds a depressed Buffy in an abandoned house, where she confesses her self-doubt and inability to let anyone become close to her. Spike tries to rally her spirits by describing that he has seen all of her, the good and the bad, but he still stands by her. Buffy asks Spike to spend the night holding her. In the first lesbian sex scene ever on American network TV, Willow and Kennedy have sex for the first time, Faith and Wood engage in a one-night stand, and Xander and Anya rekindle their sexual relationship.

The next morning, Faith gives out her orders. She sends Dawn, Xander, Willow and Anya to go and find Buffy, while she and the Potentials launch a preemptive strike on the First's armory, which turns out to be a trap. Buffy regains her will to fight and brawls with Caleb, evading nearly all of his offensive moves; in the end, she dives into a floor panel in the winery and finds a powerful battle axe that appears to have been hidden there. The episode ends with Kennedy finding a box, which Faith opens and discovers a bomb ready to detonate with only 8 seconds left. Faith yells for everyone to get down as the screen goes black.
