= Same Time, Same Place =

- Buffy the Vampire Slayer episode
- Episode no.: Season 7 Episode 3
- Directed by: James A. Contner
- Written by: Jane Espenson
- Production code: 7ABB03
- Original air date: October 8, 2002

Guest appearances
- Camden Toy as Gnarl; Anthony S. Johnson as Father; Matt Koruba as Teen Boy; Nicholette Dixon as Sister; Marshe Daniel as Brother

Episode chronology
← Previous "Beneath You"	Next → "Help"
- Buffy the Vampire Slayer season 7

"Same Time, Same Place" is the third episode of the seventh and final season of the television show Buffy the Vampire Slayer. The episode aired on October 8, 2002 on UPN.

== Plot ==
At the airport, Buffy, Dawn, and Xander wait for Willow to get off her plane from England and talk about how uncomfortable they feel about the situation. The plane clears, but the three do not see Willow. The scene repeats as Willow gets off the plane, but she does not see her friends waiting for her.

A young man spray-paints a wall of a construction site as a demon taunts him from the shadows and then attacks the frightened man.

Willow lets herself into the Summers house, which appears to be empty. Going up to what used to be her room, but now has been claimed by Buffy, Willow remembers the last time she was in the room. A door closes and Willow begins to investigate, but still her friends are nowhere to be seen. Alone, Willow curls up on the couch. Buffy, Xander, and Dawn return home and talk about how Willow did leave England and wonder where she may have ended up. They hear a noise upstairs and check it out, but find nothing.

The next morning, Willow visits the damaged Magic Box shop and finds Anya cleaning up. Anya is very cold to her and Willow feels guilty about everything. They talk a bit and Anya fills Willow in on everyone's activities since she has been gone. Willow checks out Xander's construction site and instead of Xander, she finds a skinned body. At the same time, Xander and Buffy are looking at the body and the familiar sight makes them wonder if Willow is back after all. Unbeknownst to them, a disgusted Willow climbs a ladder to exit the site.

Willow walks the halls of Sunnydale High and proceeds down to the basement where she finds Spike acting insanely. He talks to Willow about the dead body, but also carries on a conversation with someone else in the room Willow cannot see. Buffy and Xander maneuver through the basement and find Spike seemingly talking to himself. Buffy and Xander try to get information from him, but Spike is simultaneously conversing with Willow, so his words make little sense. Spike suspects they cannot see each other and that Willow is responsible for it. Buffy and Xander interpret some of Spike's comments to mean that he knows about Willow and they suspect she might have something to do with Spike's unstable condition.

Willow goes to Anya at her apartment for help in finding the demon that skinned the man at the construction site. Anya helps Willow cast a spell to locate demons all over Sunnydale, but is unable to teleport Willow to one particular location to a cave just outside the town, due to punishment for her recently undoing a spell; she also admits to Willow that she is feeling pressured and traumatized by her newfound vengeance work. Willow then decides to take the long way and walk to the cave herself, but when Anya suggests trying another spell to find Buffy, Xander and Dawn, Willow admits she has tried to do so, only to have it backfire on her. At the Summers house, Dawn researches demons that skin people via the computer and finds a demon that meets their specifications named Gnarl. The demon paralyzes his victims with his nails, and then eats strips of skin from the body and drinks the blood.

Realizing they need to search for a trail of blood, Buffy decides to recruit Spike to smell the way. He leads them to a cave where the demon can be found. Willow is already there investigating the cave and Gnarl spots her. The rest of the gang enters the cave as well, but they do not see Willow. The demon scratches Dawn's stomach and paralyzes her. Buffy and Xander take Dawn out of the cave and cover up the entrance, unintentionally trapping Willow with Gnarl. Stuck in the cave, Willow listens to the demon taunt her from the shadows. He slices her abdomen with a nail and, thus paralyzed, Willow is helpless against him as he sucks at the wound and starts to slice away slivers of her skin to eat.

Buffy and Xander carry a completely paralyzed Dawn into the living room while Buffy researches Gnarl and the way to save Dawn. Anya is called to stay with Dawn while they prepare to return to the cave to kill the demon and save Dawn. Anya talks about seeing Willow and reveals that Willow may be at the cave and that she knows about Gnarl. Panicked that Willow is trapped in the cave with Gnarl, Buffy grabs Anya to join them at the cave. Gnarl continues to eat Willow's skin as he tells her that her friends have abandoned her and she is all alone for him to eat. Buffy arrives and attacks Gnarl while Anya tends to a badly injured Willow who still cannot see her friends. While Buffy fights Gnarl, Anya informs Willow that her friends did not leave her alone.

Buffy gouges out the demon's eyes with her thumbs, successfully killing him and ending the paralysis of both Willow and Dawn, as well as the spell making Willow and her friends invisible to each other. Willow is relieved to see her friends and glad that they did not abandon her.

In the morning, Willow meditates and uses magic from the earth to re-grow the skin she lost. Buffy stops by and talks with Willow. Willow reveals that her fear of seeing her friends and their judgment of her led to the invisibility problem from which they all were suffering. Buffy confesses that she briefly suspected Willow of the grotesque killing, but Willow does not blame her for that. Willow struggles to start meditating again, so Buffy offers her Slayer strength to her friend and joins in the meditation.

== Cultural references ==
The website Women at Warp compares the mutual-invisibility situation with the Star Trek: The Next Generation episode "The Next Phase." "When LaForge and Ro end up out of phase with their timeline, they walk around witnessing normal life happening all around them, no one able to see or hear their cries for help. Following her stint in "magic rehab," Willow returns to Sunnydale out of phase with everyone else around her. In this scenario, however, it's not just that Willow's friends don't see her—she can't see them either. While the mechanics may differ, the internal struggle is the same as each character grapples with what it's like to be forgotten."

== Continuity ==
=== Arc significance ===
Anya's advice to Buffy when she's fighting Gnarl, "Get him in the eyes," is a flashforward to "Dirty Girls," when Caleb gouges out Xander's eye.

== Reception ==
A.V. Club said the episode, "does a fine job of doubling back when necessary to show how all the characters are sharing spaces without realizing it."
