= Buffy the Vampire Slayer: Chaos Bleeds =

2003 video game

- Developer: Eurocom Entertainment Software
- Publisher: Vivendi Universal Games (Note: Released in PAL regions under the Sierra Entertainment brand name.)
- Writers: Christopher Golden; Thomas Sniegoski
- Composer: Ian Livingstone
- Platforms: GameCube, PlayStation 2, Xbox
- Release: NA: August 26, 2003; EU: October 24, 2003; AU: October 29, 2003
- Genres: Action, beat 'em up
- Modes: Single-player, multiplayer

Buffy the Vampire Slayer: Chaos Bleeds is a 2003 beat 'em up video game developed by Eurocom and published by Vivendi Universal Games for GameCube, PlayStation 2 and Xbox. It is the fourth game in the Buffy the Vampire Slayer franchise and the only multiplatform game. It was the first to allow players to control characters other than Buffy Summers and feature a fully developed multiplayer mode. (Note: Additional players had a limited ability to interact in a hidden debugging mode in the previous game, Buffy the Vampire Slayer.)

== Plot ==
In this game Buffy discovers that Ethan Rayne is at the center of a great struggle with the First, literally the first incarnation of evil the world has ever known. She and the gang must face an undead army of vampires, zombies, and demons to keep these nefarious villains from casting the world into permanent darkness. The plot involves different alternate realities bleeding into Buffy's own reality, leading to the reappearance of deceased enemies and the appearance of evil versions of allies. With the help of Sid the Dummy and Ethan's ancestor Cassandra Rayne, Buffy and her friends defeat the First in its own dimension and, though it can never be killed, they disperse it across multiple realities for centuries.

=== Setting ===
The story is set during the television series' fifth season. Due to certain plot points mentioned and character styles, the game takes place some time after Forever (since Joyce's grave is seen), but before Tough Love (since Tara has not been driven insane by Glory), presumably in between Intervention and Tough Love (since Spike is on more-or-less friendly terms with the Scooby Gang). Oddly, Dawn Summers is nowhere to be seen and is not even mentioned. The game also includes many references to previous episodes of both Buffy the Vampire Slayer and Angel, including Faith being in jail and Giles' days as Ripper. The game extends an idea from a previous game: that of bringing back dead characters (the Master returned in a previous game), by bringing back Sid the Dummy, Kakistos, Adam, and Anya's former demon self, Anyanka.

== Gameplay ==
As well as the single-player story mode, the game features several different multiplayer games. These are:

- "Survival" – player-on-player combat;
- "Bunny Catcher" – players compete to collect rabbits;
- "Slayer Challenge" – a single player must defeat as many enemies as possible (additional players can take control of the enemies);
- "Domination" – players must compete to control magical pentagrams for as long as possible.

At first, only one map (Zoo) and four characters (Buffy, Spike, Willow, Xander) are available. More maps (Cemetery, Initiative Hanger, Quarry) and characters (Male Vampire, Female Vampire, Zombie Skeleton, Tara, Zombie Demon, Zombie Devil, Bat Beast, Materani, Sid, Psycho Patient, S&M Slave, S&M Mistress, Faith, Kakistos, Zombie Soldier, Chainz, Abominator, Zombie Gorilla, Chris (Mutant Enemy), Joss Whedon) become unlocked as one plays through the main, single-player game and finds secret areas.

"DVD-style" extras can be unlocked by finding certain secret areas during the single-player game. These include interviews, behind-the-scenes footage and also the Chaos Bleeds tie-in comic book.

== Tie-ins ==
Chaos Bleeds tie-ins

A comic book prequel was published by Dark Horse. Its story, centering on Buffy, Willow, Xander, and Spike dealing with alternate reality versions of deceased Gorch family members, was set just before the game (the comic's blurb confirms that it is set in season five) and established the idea that the walls between realities were dissolving and the realities were 'bleeding' into each other. The comic was also available in the game itself as an unlockable special feature. Additionally, the comic was reprinted as part of the Buffy the Vampire Slayer 2005 Annual in Britain.

Like the game, the comic was written by Christopher Golden and Tom Sniegoski and featured art by veteran Buffy the Vampire Slayer comic book artist Cliff Richards as well as cover art by J. Scott Campbell.

There was also a novelization published by Pocket Books. The author, James A. Moore, used the storyline originally developed by Christopher Golden for the game.

== Reception ==
Reception

Aggregate score
Aggregator	Score		
Aggregator	GameCube	PS2	Xbox
Metacritic	75/100	72/100	73/100

Review scores
Publication	Score		
Publication	GameCube	PS2	Xbox
AllGame	N/A	N/A	3/5
Electronic Gaming Monthly	6.17/10	6.17/10	6.17/10
Eurogamer	N/A	5/10	N/A
Famitsu	N/A	N/A	24/40
Game Informer	N/A	8.25/10	8/10
GamePro	4/5	N/A	N/A
GameRevolution	C	C	C
GameSpot	8.2/10	8.2/10	8.2/10
GameSpy	4/5	3/5	4/5
GameZone	7.4/10	8.2/10	N/A
IGN	7.7/10	7.7/10	7.7/10
Nintendo Power	4.1/5	N/A	N/A
Official U.S. PlayStation Magazine	N/A	3/5	N/A
Official Xbox Magazine (US)	N/A	N/A	8.8/10
Maxim	8/10	8/10	8/10

The GameCube version received "generally favorable reviews", while the PlayStation 2 and Xbox versions received "average" reviews, according to the review aggregation website Metacritic. In Japan, where the Xbox version was ported on December 25, 2003, Famitsu gave it a score of one seven, two sixes, and one five for a total of 24 out of 40.

In a positive review, GameSpot reviewer Alex Navarro praised the music, atmosphere, story, and realistic combat of the game, although he criticized the "dated" visuals, repetitive puzzles, and described the multi-player mode as "not executed well". In a final statement, Navarro said that "Chaos Bleeds is an excellent, well-put-together action adventure game that most fans of the genre should be able to enjoy and any Buffy the Vampire Slayer fan will love."

Chaos Bleeds is generally regarded as an inferior sequel to the 2002 Xbox-exclusive game, with GameCell UK stating that "There are other games out there that do what this does better; one ironic thing is that the first Buffy game is one of them. The Xbox Buffy seemed to play much more smoothly and faster, had 5.1 sounds and did not have so many combat glitches and iffy collision detections." Xbox World Australia mentioned that "It manages to improve slightly on most aspects of the original game and makes for a more accessible and less frustrating experience, barring some minor bungles in the graphical department and the over-simplistic combat. Even if the multiplayer mode is disappointingly shallow, the great single-player portion that allows you to play as no less than six different characters makes up for it in a big way."
