= Caleb (Buffy the Vampire Slayer) =

- Buffy the Vampire Slayer character
- First appearance: "Dirty Girls" (2003)
- Last appearance: "Chosen"
- Created by: Joss Whedon, Drew Goddard
- Portrayed by: Nathan Fillion

In-universe information
- Affiliation: The First Evil
- Notable powers: Superhuman strength, stamina, and durability superior to that of vampires and vampire Slayers.

Caleb is a fictional character played by Nathan Fillion in the television series Buffy the Vampire Slayer created by Joss Whedon. The character is a sadistic sociopath with a pathological hatred of women.

According to Whedon, the character was introduced because the mutable, non-corporeal nature of the First Evil "meant that we didn't have anything to push against. We needed... a sidekick. Somebody physical that we can see from episode to episode." Whedon describes him as "the creepiest priest", adding, "he is the most bald-faced misogynist we've had since, well, since last year, with Warren."

== Character biography ==
As revealed through his conversations with the First Evil, Caleb was a defrocked priest and serial killer responsible for the deaths of at least two girls, whom he lured with his sermons and charms. By the time of his appearance in the show, he is acting as a lieutenant to the First.

Despite not appearing until the last five episodes of the series, the character is revealed to be one of the prime movers for the events of the seventh season. In an effort to eliminate all threats to the First Evil's resurgence, he directed hordes of Bringers to systematically kill Potential Slayers around the world. He also ordered the bombing of the Watchers' Council Headquarters in London, causing the deaths of Quentin Travers and all current Watchers and Council Operatives present, and arranged for a prisoner to attack Faith in a Los Angeles prison.

In the episode "Dirty Girls," Caleb attacks the Scooby Gang in person. He murders two potential Slayers, Molly and Dianne. He also breaks the arm of another (Rona), and effortlessly defeats Buffy, Faith, and Spike. Before the Gang retreats, he also violently blinds Xander in one eye by forcing his thumb into his left eye socket.

The character later dies in the last two episodes of the series, "End of Days" and "Chosen".

== Powers and abilities ==
The character Caleb provided a villain with a physical threat, in contrast to the non-corporeal First Evil, and a recognizable counterweight to Buffy and her allies.

The character's body serves as a vessel for the superhuman power of the non-corporeal First Evil. The First makes him the commander of its campaign of carnage and mayhem. Caleb likes to re-enact his killings by asking The First to take on the form of the girls he's killed so he may "kill them again". With the exception of Glory, Caleb's strength dwarfs Buffy's previous adversaries. When channeling the power of the First Evil, he possesses immense physical strength and durability, greatly exceeding that of most other demons, slayers and vampires. He effortlessly defeats the combined might of Buffy, Faith and Spike in their first encounter. In order to maintain this power, Caleb must merge with the First to recharge after extended periods. Power transfusions from the First also allow Caleb the ability to return from death, as long as his body is still intact.

== Beliefs ==
The character periodically delivers quasi-biblical quotes, even frequently making allusions to his belief that the First Evil is actually God, or even superior to God. When The First, in the guise of Buffy, asks him if he thinks it is God, Caleb replies he believes The First is beyond such definition. He states plainly in his debut episode, "I don't truck with Satan, that was just me havin' fun. Satan is a little man". Caleb also comments further on his admiration of the First, when it, under the guise of Buffy, vocalizes its envy of humans' ability to feel lust and engage in primal sexual acts. At the same time, several members of the Scooby Gang engage in such activity elsewhere. He dismisses them all as "sinners", commenting enthusiastically that The First is miles beyond that, for it is "sin" itself. The character quotes the Old Testament more often than the New Testament. For example, the character's misogynistic views are expressed through the story of Adam, Eve, and the forbidden fruit. When asked about the character's religious connections, Whedon said, "I'm not coming down against priests. This guy clearly is not one".

== Writing and acting ==
- Caleb was referred to by Buffy writers as the "Second", a reference to his boss' nickname, the "First",

== Appearances ==
Caleb appears in:

Buffy the Vampire Slayer

Caleb appeared as a guest in 5 episodes:

- Season 7 – "Dirty Girls," "Empty Places," "Touched," "End of Days," "Chosen"

Buffy the Vampire Slayer Season Eight

Caleb appeared in a dream in the e-comic "Always Darkest."

== See also ==
- List of Buffyverse villains and supernatural beings
