= First Evil =

Buffy the Vampire Slayer villain

The First Evil
- Buffy the Vampire Slayer character
- First appearance: "Amends" (1998)
- Last appearance: "Chosen" (2003)
- Created by: Joss Whedon
- Portrayed by: Robia LaMorte; Cornelia Hayes O'Herlihy; Edward Edwards; Shane Barach; Adam Busch; Clare Kramer; George Hertzberg; Harry Groener; Juliet Landau; Mark Metcalf; Sarah Michelle Gellar; Azura Skye; Kristine Sutherland; James Marsters; Danny Strong; Amanda Fuller; K. D. Aubert; Lalaine; Carrie Southworth; Nathan Fillion

In-universe information
- Classification: Higher deity, The Devil
- Notable powers: Assumes form of anyone that has died Can bestow superhuman strength and durability Limited reality warping Beyond life and death, thus truly immortal.

The First Evil (usually called The First) is a fictional character created by Joss Whedon for the TV series Buffy the Vampire Slayer. The First Evil first appeared in the third season episode "Amends", and became the main antagonist of the seventh and final season.

A being manifested from all evil in existence, the First is an incorporeal entity that can assume the appearance of any person who has died (however briefly) – including vampires and humans who have been resurrected. Over the course of the series, and depending upon its audience, it takes various guises as a method of deception and manipulation – for example, the First usually appears as Buffy Summers (Sarah Michelle Gellar) to the Slayer and her allies, but it also assumes the forms of Warren Mears, Spike, Drusilla and Jonathan Levinson on multiple occasions, among a variety of other forms taken less frequently.

Its only real weakness is that it is non-corporeal, and therefore cannot cause any real physical damage. It is expert at psychological manipulation, and can act through its servants, such as the Bringers, Turok-Han, Caleb or whatever person it can manage to influence.

== Biography ==
=== Character history ===
The First Evil claims to be the source and embodiment of all that is evil. For technical purposes, the First Evil is neither male, female, demon, nor god; it is a "power". The First is older than demons, even the Old Ones, who themselves existed long before the first humans; it is older than the written word, the Big Bang, and transcends all realities and dimensions; it is older than any other evil being and may even be the very first entity ever to have existed. It is said that the First lurked in the darkness long before the universe was even created and shall remain long after the universe ends. Few have heard of The First Evil, and fewer still believe it exists, yet it commands a small collective of worshippers; furthermore, because all sentient beings with an inherent capacity for malice—including humans, demons, and deities like the Mayor—serve as its structural miniatures, The First can manifest in the physical forms of deceased 'Big Bads' who were ultimately extensions of its primordial essence. Consequently, it can assume the likeness of anyone who has died—as well as manifest as an enormous, phantasmic, horned creature with elongated, talon-shaped fingers—while retaining the ability to selectively make itself visible and audible to a single individual or to multiple people simultaneously. Despite its absolute nature, The First faces strategic opposition from rival factions, including the centuries-old, interdimensional occult law firm Wolfram & Hart; though fully aware of the entity and actively working against it to safeguard their own malicious agendas, the Senior Partners and their syndicate remain, by definition, structural parts of the overarching primordial evil. The entity cannot affect the world on a physical level; rather, its power lies in its ability to deceive, torment, and manipulate others. The First has a deep understanding of human nature, and it uses this knowledge to drive others to madness, murder, and/or suicide.

The First makes its initial appearance in the series as a monster of the week that Angel must face in the episode "Amends". It tries to drive the vampire to kill Buffy by reminding him of his "true" nature (Angelus), and it sets about accomplishing this by appearing to him as some of his victims: Daniel, Margaret, Travis and Jenny Calendar. It claims that it is responsible for Angel's return from Hell, and suggests that Angel can end his sufferings by turning evil again and killing Buffy, but instead he chooses to kill himself using the sunrise. His suicide is only averted by a freak snowstorm unheard of in Southern California. Episodes of the spin-off series Angel later suggest that Angel was returned from hell and his life saved by divine intervention from the heavenly Powers That Be.

Later, the First makes its presence known again in the seventh season by tormenting the vampire Spike, who like Angel has come into possession of a soul; tricking the former villain Andrew Wells into awakening the Hellmouth beneath Sunnydale High; and dispatching its agents, the Bringers, to kill young women around the world with the potential to succeed Faith as the current Slayer. When Buffy's allies Giles and Anya query the First's sudden rise in activity with a mystical third party, they learn that the First is able to act in this way because of an anomaly in the Slayer line caused by Buffy's recent resurrection, providing an outlet for the First to wipe out all the Slayers. Though incorporeal, the First is effective in prompting suicides, deceiving various members of Buffy's gang, and releasing evil monsters from the Hellmouth. Later in season 7, the audience is introduced to the First's right-hand-man, the supernaturally strong misogynistic ex-priest Caleb, as well as its army of primordial Turok-Han vampires living beneath the Hellmouth. In the series finale, Buffy and her allies take the fight to the First by opening the Hellmouth and using magic to activate every potential Slayer in Buffy's army. With additional help from a magical amulet, the gang destroy the First's army, the Sunnydale Hellmouth, and the surrounding town.

=== Powers and abilities ===
Neither male or female, living or dead, the First is pure power. It is the darkness inside the hearts and souls of all living creatures. While the First has no physical body and is impossible to kill, it also cannot truly interact with the physical world. Certain people are able to interact and even become one with the First, such as Caleb.

The First appears in the physical world as dead people, including vampires, humans who have died, and dead people who have been resurrected. This allows the First to impersonate people for the purpose of manipulating others. For instance, the First appears as Warren to get Andrew to kill Jonathan during "Lessons," as Eve to more easily attack the Potentials during "Showtime," and as Buffy to amplify Spike's torture throughout season 7. The First seems also to know mannerisms, information and details of the life of whoever it imitates. This is best shown in "Conversations with Dead People" as the First appears to Dawn as her mother Joyce, appears to Andrew as Warren and appears to Willow as Cassie Newton, in an attempt to manipulate them all into serving its purpose.

As essentially the source of all evil, the First has knowledge of every monster and dark ritual in existence. This was exemplified by the runes the Bringers carved into Spike's chest to summon the Turok-Han.

As the First is said to be eternal, existing before time and believed to be the only thing remaining after the end of time, it is infinitely patient. A defeat it suffers is nothing more than a minor setback.

In Chaos Bleeds, the First displayed the ability to possess people, open portals, teleport beings across dimensions and, according to Sid, conjure a duplicate dummy body for him and trap his soul inside.

== Appearances ==
The First Evil has appeared in 16 canonical Buffyverse episodes:

Buffy the Vampire Slayer

- Season 3 (1998)
  - "Amends" (as Daniel, Margaret, Jenny Calendar, and Travis–name revealed in the shooting scripts).
- Season 7 (2002–2003)
  - "Lessons" (as Warren Mears, Glory, Adam, The Mayor, Drusilla, The Master, and Buffy Summers)
  - "Selfless" (as Buffy Summers)
  - "Conversations with Dead People" (as Warren Mears, Cassie Newton, and Joyce Summers)
  - "Sleeper" (as Buffy Summers and Spike)
  - "Never Leave Me" (as Buffy Summers, Spike, Warren Mears, and Jonathan Levinson)
  - "Bring on the Night" (as Spike and Drusilla)
  - "Showtime" (as Buffy Summers and Eve)
  - "First Date" (as Jonathan Levinson and Nikki Wood)
  - "Get It Done" (as Chloe)
  - "Storyteller" (as Warren Mears)
  - "Dirty Girls" (as Buffy Summers and Betty)
  - "Empty Places" (as Buffy Summers)
  - "Touched" (as Richard Wilkins and Buffy Summers)
  - "End of Days" (as Buffy Summers)
  - "Chosen" (as Buffy Summers and Caleb).

The First appears in the non-canonical video game Buffy the Vampire Slayer: Chaos Bleeds as the main antagonist, having helped occultist magician Ethan Rayne escape military confinement to enact a plan for world domination. Buffy and her friends pursue the First over multiple realities and across the centuries, eventually "dispersing it across dimensions" to stop its plans to consume the universe with evil.

== Bringers of the First Evil ==
The Bringers of the First Evil, or Harbingers of Death, are the acolytes of the First Evil. They are humans who have been corrupted by the First and undergone rituals that include self-mutilation: their eyes and tongues are removed, and their eyelids covered by rune-like scars; yet they are perfectly aware of their surroundings.

It is implied that the First's high priest, Caleb, has played an important role in indoctrinating the Bringers. He possesses extensive knowledge of their habits (such as knowing that they pant instead of sweating) and refers to them as "my boys". Indeed, The Harbingers of Death themselves refer to him as their "teacher".

The Bringers also have a poisonous aura which is capable of rendering earth and living beings sterile:

For they are the harbingers of death, nothing shall grow above or below them, no seed shall flower, neither in Man nor...

Despite their apparent disabilities, Bringers are swift assassins capable of highly organized attacks thanks to their collective consciousness, which is under the control of the First. Besides their deadly fighting skills, Bringers are also capable of summoning manifestations of the First to haunt people, and create psychic links between dreamers through their dark rituals.

In season 7, The First declared war on the Slayer line. The Bringers became assassins of Potential Slayers around the world. When the First set up camp in Sunnydale, Bringers begin to swarm the town to hunt down arriving Potentials and to unearth the Scythe, a mystic weapon created by Guardians: ancient, powerful women who cared for the Slayer.

== Analysis ==
Picart and Browning describe the First Evil as "evil by definition". According to Gregory Stevenson Whedon's creation of the First Evil shows that evil is persistent. It can never stop nor be fully defeated. There is always a balance between good and evil and the characters get from one fight, that is won to the next. As the evil is an entity that can not be fully defeated, Buffy and their friends have to keep it up with an army of this entity within the last season, which can be defeated by them, while the entity continues to exist.

According to J'annine Jobling the First Evil seems to be "a radical reversal of the Christian mythos". "An original graced state gave way to a fallen one" because of "humans' disobedience and misuse of free will". According to Augustine of Hippo, a god who is perfect is not able to be the "source of evil", just as the "First Evil" does not seem to be able to be the source of any good.

According to James B. South, Buffy Summers is not interested in the theological implications of this entity. She merely states: "Alright, I get it, you're evil." He adds that the First Evil seems to precede good. It is omnipresent and very powerful. With it, Joss Whedon was aiming to create an enemy that was neither human nor demon. It could either appear in a human form or in a demonic form.

== See also ==
- Harbingers of Death
