= Rebecca Rand Kirshner =

American writer and producer

Rebecca Kirshner
- Born: Rebecca Rand Kirshner; 1974 (age 50–51); United States
- Occupation: Writer, Showrunner

Rebecca Kirshner is a writer and producer for American television. Her writing credits include Freaks and Geeks, Buffy the Vampire Slayer, and Gilmore Girls. She was the executive producer and showrunner of 90210 for the second and third season. According to a CBS rep, Kirshner was a saving force for the CW drama. She left the show in 2011 to pursue other creative interests.

== Life and career ==
Kirshner has written for television under several names including Rebecca Kirshner, Rebecca Rand Kirshner, Rebecca Rand Kirshner Sinclair, R.R.K. Sinclair and Rebecca Sinclair. In 2022, she asked an interviewer to call her Rebecca X, having "dropped her patriarchal last name." She is currently writing as Rebecca Kirshner. She has written both hour long and half-hour long pilots.

In addition to her work in television, Kirshner writes children's stories and is a visual artist. In 2016, her art show "How to Make Love to a Cactus" was exhibited in Los Angeles and Yucca Valley.

She attended Harvard University where she was on the Harvard Lampoon as an editor and artist. She is the daughter of astrophysics professor Robert Kirshner, the great-granddaughter of Olympic hurdler William Rand and the descendant of Rebecca Nurse who was executed as a witch in Salem in 1692.

She married writer Josh Lieb in 2001. They divorced in 2003. She married New Zealand filmmaker and musician Harry Sinclair in December 2008. They were divorced in April 2016. In January 2018, she married French author Thibaut Mosneron Dupin. She has two children. In 2019, she co-created the children's animated series Kiri and Lou with Sinclair.

== Television work ==
=== Freaks and Geeks ===
- "The Diary" (First Aired: Monday January 31, 2000)

=== Buffy the Vampire Slayer ===
- "Out of My Mind" (First Aired: Tuesday October 17, 2000)
- "Listening to Fear" (First Aired: Tuesday November 28, 2000)
- "Tough Love" (First Aired: Tuesday May 1, 2001)
- "Tabula Rasa" (First Aired: Tuesday November 13, 2001)
- "Hell's Bells" (First Aired: Tuesday March 5, 2002)
- "Help" (First Aired: Tuesday October 15, 2002)
- "Potential" (First Aired: Tuesday January 21, 2003)
- "Touched" (First Aired: Tuesday May 6, 2003)

=== Gilmore Girls ===
Co- Executive Producer (S7)

- "Emily Says Hello" (First Aired: Tuesday November 16, 2004)
- "How Many Kropogs to Cape Cod?" (First Aired: Tuesday May 3, 2005)
- "Always a Godmother, Never a God" (First Aired: Tuesday October 4, 2005)
- "Bridesmaid Revisited" (First Aired: Tuesday February 28, 2006)
- "That's What You Get, Folks, For Makin' Whoopee" (First Aired: Tuesday October 3, 2006)
- "Go, Bulldogs!" (First Aired: Tuesday November 7, 2006)
- "Santa's Secret Stuff" (First Aired: Tuesday January 23, 2007)
- "I'd Rather Be in Philadelphia" (First Aired: Tuesday February 6, 2007)
- "I'm a Kayak, Hear Me Roar" (First Aired: Tuesday February 20, 2007)
- "Hay Bale Maze" (First Aired: Tuesday April 17, 2007)

=== 90210 ===
Showrunner (Seasons 2 & 3), Executive Producer (from episode "Secrets and Lies")

Writer:

- "Okaeri, Donna!" (First Aired: Tuesday April 14, 2009)
- "Between a Sign and a Hard Place" (First Aired: Tuesday April 21, 2009)
- "One Party Can Ruin Your Whole Summer" (First Aired: Tuesday May 19, 2009)
- "To New Beginnings" (First Aired: Tuesday September 8, 2009)
- "Women's Intuition" (First Aired: Tuesday November 3, 2009)
- "And Away They Go" (First Aired: Tuesday December 1, 2009)
- "Girl Fight" (First Aired: Tuesday March 16, 2010)
- "Confessions" (First Aired: Tuesday May 18, 2010)
- "Holiday Madness" (First Aired: Monday December 6, 2010)
- "The Enchanted Donkey" (First Aired: Monday April 18, 2011)
- "To the Future!" (First Aired: Monday May 16, 2011)

== Print work ==
- "Sonnenblume," Tales of the Slayers (2002)
- "The War Between the States," Tales of the Slayer, Vol. 2 (2003)
- "How to Make Love to a Cactus" (2016)
