= Buffy the Vampire Slayer Season Twelve =

2018 comic book series

Publication information
- Publisher: Dark Horse Comics
- Schedule: Monthly
- Format: Limited series
- Genre: Horror
- Publication date: June – September 2018
- No. of issues: 4
- Main character: Scooby Gang

Creative team
- Created by: Joss Whedon
- Written by: Joss Whedon; Christos Gage
- Penciller: Georges Jeanty

Buffy the Vampire Slayer Season Twelve: The Reckoning is the sequel to the Season Eleven comic book series, a canonical continuation of the television series Buffy the Vampire Slayer. The series was published by Dark Horse Comics and began on June 20, 2018. The series consists of four issues, co-written by creator Joss Whedon and Christos Gage, and illustrated by Georges Jeanty. It is the final season of the Buffy the Vampire Slayer canonical comic book series.

A reboot of the comics set in the present day is currently being published by BOOM! Studios. The series began on January 23, 2019.

== Publication ==
=== Single issues ===
Title	Issue #	Release date
"The Reckoning, Part I: One Year Later"	1	June 20, 2018
Writer: Christos Gage & Joss Whedon		Penciller: Georges Jeanty
"The Reckoning, Part II: Future Shock"	2	July 18, 2018
Writer: Christos Gage & Joss Whedon		Penciller: Georges Jeanty
"The Reckoning, Part III: The Reckoning"	3	August 22, 2018
Writer: Christos Gage & Joss Whedon		Penciller: Georges Jeanty
"The Reckoning, Part IV: Finale"	4	September 19, 2018
Writer: Christos Gage & Joss Whedon		Penciller: Georges Jeanty

=== Trade paperbacks ===
Volume	Title	Issues collected	Release date	ISBN
1	"The Reckoning"	The Reckoning (1–4)	December, 2018	978-1506709154
