= Clara Bryant =

American actress lawyer and corporate counsel

- Born: February 7, 1985 (age 41)
- Occupations: Actress, lawyer, corporate counsel
- Years active: 1991–2007

Clara Elise Bryant (February 7, 1985) is an American actress, lawyer, and corporate counsel. She is best known for her roles as Amy in Under Wraps and Tru Walker in Tru Confessions. She is an alumna of University of Georgia School of Law. Bone Eater was Clara Bryant's final acting project before she retired from acting.

After retiring from acting in 2007, she went on to law school. Today Bryant is a lawyer in Atlanta, Georgia. Bryant is married to Todd Hollett. They have a son and a daughter. She works as a corporate counsel for Swisslog.

== Filmography ==
=== Film ===
Year	Title	Role	Notes
1994	Once in a Lifetime	The Little Girl	
1994	Leslie's Folly	Unknown	
1997	Under Wraps	Amy	
1999	L'Amante perduto	Dafi	
2002	Tru Confessions	Trudy Elizabeth "Tru" Walker	
2002	Due East	Mary Faith Rapple	
2007	Bone Eater	Kelly Evans	

=== Television ===
- 1991 Gabriel's Fire as Rachel Goldstein
  - "A Prayer for the Goldsteins" (season 1, episode 18), March 7, 1991
- 1992 Billy as Annie MacGregor
- 1992 Roseanne as Lisa Healy
  - "It's No Place Like Home for the Holidays" (season 5, episode 12), December 15, 1992
- 1993 Star Trek: Deep Space Nine as Chandra
  - "Move Along Home" (season 1, episode 10), March 14, 1993
- 2002–2003 Buffy the Vampire Slayer as Molly
  - "Bring on the Night" (season 7, episode 10), December 17, 2002
  - "Showtime" (season 7, episode 11), January 7, 2003
  - "Potential" (season 7, episode 12), January 21, 2003
  - "Get It Done" (season 7, episode 15), February 18, 2003
  - "Storyteller" (season 7, episode 16), February 25, 2003
  - "Lies My Parents Told Me" (season 7, episode 17), March 25, 2003
  - "Dirty Girls" (season 7, episode 18), April 15, 2003
- 2003 Fastlane as Muffy
  - "Simone Says" (season 1, episode 17), March 14, 2003
- 2003 Hack as Jessica
  - "To Have and Have Not" (season 2, episode 9), November 22, 2003
- 2006 Numb3rs as Karen
  - "Double Down" (season 2, episode 13), January 13, 2006

== Awards and nominations ==
=== Awards ===
- 2003 – Young Artist Award – Best Performance in a TV Movie, Miniseries, or Special, Leading Young Actress for Tru Confessions

=== Nominations ===
- 1998 – Young Artist Award – Best Performance in a TV Movie or Feature Film, Young Ensemble for Under Wraps (shared with Mario Yedidia and Adam Wylie)
- 2001 – Young Artist Award – Best Performance in a Feature Film, Supporting Young Actress for L' Amante Perduto
