= List of Buffy the Vampire Slayer characters =

Major and recurring characters created by Joss Whedon for the television series Buffy the Vampire Slayer are as follows:

== Cast ==
=== Main cast ===
The following characters were featured in the opening credits of the program.

Actor	Character	Count	Seasons						
Actor	Character	Count	1	2	3	4	5	6	7
Sarah Michelle Gellar	Buffy Summers	144	Main	Main	Main	Main	Main	Main	Main
Nicholas Brendon	Xander Harris	143	Main	Main	Main	Main	Main	Main	Main
Alyson Hannigan	Willow Rosenberg	144	Main	Main	Main	Main	Main	Main	Main
Charisma Carpenter	Cordelia Chase	54	Main	Main	Main				
Anthony Stewart Head	Rupert Giles	121	Main	Main	Main	Main	Main	Recurring	Recurring
David Boreanaz	Angel	56	Recurring	Main	Main	Guest	Guest		Guest
Seth Green	Daniel "Oz" Osbourne	39		Recurring	Main (Note: Seth Green is in the main cast of the first six episodes of Season Four, departing in "Wild at Heart" before making two guest appearances later in the season.)	Main			
James Marsters	Spike	96		Recurring	Guest	Main (Note: James Marsters makes two guest appearances in the fourth season before joining the main cast in episode 7, "The Initiative".)	Main	Main	Main
Marc Blucas	Riley Finn	31				Main (Note: Marc Blucas appears in eight episodes before joining the main cast in "Doomed", episode 11 of the fourth season. He departs in "Into the Woods", episode 10 of the fifth season.)	Main	Guest	
Emma Caulfield	Anya Jenkins	81			Recurring	Recurring	Main	Main	Main
Michelle Trachtenberg	Dawn Summers	66					Main (Note: Michelle Trachtenberg makes a guest appearance in episode 1, "Buffy vs. Dracula" of Season Five before immediately being upgraded to a regular in episode 2, "Real Me".)	Main	Main
Amber Benson	Tara Maclay	47				Recurring	Recurring	Main (Note: Amber Benson is recurring until "Seeing Red", episode 19 of season 6, the only episode for which she is credited in the main cast. She reverts to guest star status in "Villains", episode 20 of season 6.)	

=== Recurring cast ===
Actor	Character	Count	Seasons						
Actor	Character	Count	1	2	3	4	5	6	7
Mark Metcalf	The Master	8	Recurring		Guest				Guest
Kristine Sutherland	Joyce Summers	58	Recurring	Recurring	Recurring	Recurring	Recurring	Guest	Guest
Julie Benz	Darla	5	Recurring	Guest			Guest		
Andrew J. Ferchland	The Anointed One	6	Recurring	Guest					
Robia LaMorte	Jenny Calendar	14	Guest	Recurring	Guest				
Armin Shimerman	Principal Snyder	19	Guest	Recurring	Recurring	Guest			
Juliet Landau	Drusilla	17		Recurring			Guest		Recurring
Danny Strong	Jonathan Levinson	29		Recurring	Recurring	Guest		Recurring	Recurring
Bianca Lawson	Kendra	3		Recurring					
Larry Bagby	Larry Blaisdell	7		Guest	Recurring				
Jason Hall	Devon MacLeish	8		Guest	Recurring	Guest			
K. Todd Freeman	Mr. Trick	5			Recurring				
Fab Filippo	Scott Hope	3			Recurring				
Eliza Dushku	Faith Lehane	20			Recurring	Guest			Recurring
Harry Groener	Mayor	14			Recurring	Guest			Guest
Mercedes McNab	Harmony Kendall	15	Guest	Guest	Recurring	Recurring	Recurring		
Alexis Denisof	Wesley Wyndam-Pryce	9			Recurring				
Lindsay Crouse	Maggie Walsh	9				Recurring			
Phina Oruche	Olivia	3				Recurring			
Adam Kaufman	Parker Abrams	5				Recurring			
Paige Moss	Veruca	3				Recurring			
Bailey Chase	Graham Miller	13				Recurring	Recurring		
Leonard Roberts	Forrest Gates	12				Recurring			
George Hertzberg	Adam	10				Recurring			Guest
Charlie Weber	Benjamin "Ben" Wilkinson	14					Recurring		
Clare Kramer	Glory	13					Recurring		Guest
Troy T. Blendell	Jinx	6					Recurring		
Joel Grey	Doc	3					Recurring		
Todd Duffey	Murk	6					Recurring		
Adam Busch	Warren Mears	16					Guest	Recurring	Recurring
Tom Lenk	Andrew Wells	27						Recurring	Recurring
James Charles Leary	Clem	8						Recurring	Guest
Elizabeth Anne Allen	Amy Madison	8	Guest	Guest	Guest	Guest		Recurring	Guest
Kali Rocha	Halfrek	7					Guest	Recurring	Guest
D. B. Woodside	Robin Wood	14							Recurring
Sarah Hagan	Amanda	10							Recurring
Camden Toy	Ubervamp	4							Recurring
Iyari Limon	Kennedy	13							Recurring
Clara Bryant	Molly	5							Recurring
Indigo	Rona	8							Recurring
Felicia Day	Vi	8							Recurring
Kristy Wu	Chao-Ahn	6							Recurring
Nathan Fillion	Caleb	5							Recurring
Mary Wilcher	Shannon	3							Recurring
Dania Ramirez	Caridad	3							Recurring

=== Notable guest cast ===
Actor	Character	Count	Seasons						
Actor	Character	Count	1	2	3	4	5	6	7
Eric Balfour	Jesse McNally	2	Guest						
Dean Butler	Hank Summers	4	Guest	Guest			Guest	Guest	
Robin Sachs	Ethan Rayne	4		Guest	Guest	Guest			
Julia Lee	Anne Steele	2		Guest	Guest				
Saverio Guerra	Willy the Snitch	5		Guest	Guest	Guest			
Harris Yulin	Quentin Travers	3			Guest		Guest		Guest
Andy Umberger	D'Hoffryn	4			Guest	Guest		Guest	Guest
Sharon Ferguson	First Slayer	4				Guest	Guest		Guest
K. D. Aubert	Nikki Wood	3					Guest (Note: The role was played by April Weeden-Washington in Season 5.)		Guest
Amelinda Embry	Katrina Silber	3					Guest	Guest	
Azura Skye	Cassie Newton	2							Guest
Lalaine	Chloe	2							Guest

== Main characters ==
=== Buffy Summers ===
- Portrayed by Sarah Michelle Gellar

The show's titular protagonist, Buffy, is "The Slayer", one in a long line of young girls chosen by fate to battle evil forces in the form of vampires and demons. The Slayer has no jurisdiction over human crime. Slaying vampires and other paranormal beings is her specialty and she has a personal rule against killing humans. This calling mystically endows her with a limited degree of clairvoyance, usually in the form of prophetic dreams, as well as dramatically increased physical strength, endurance, agility, intuition, and speed and ease of healing. Traditionally, there has been only one Slayer alive at any given moment, with a new one called upon the event of her death.

=== Xander Harris ===
- Portrayed by Nicholas Brendon

Xander is a close friend of Buffy. Possessing no supernatural skills, Xander provides comic relief as well as a grounded, everyman perspective in the supernatural Buffyverse. In another departure from the usual conventions of television, Xander is notable for being an insecure and subordinate male in a world dominated by powerful females.

=== Willow Rosenberg ===
- Portrayed by Alyson Hannigan

Willow was originally a nerdy girl who contrasted Buffy's cheerleader personality but also shared the social isolation Buffy suffered after becoming a Slayer. As the series progressed, Willow became a more assertive and even sensual character; in particular, she realized that she was a lesbian and became a powerful Wiccan. Willow is Buffy's best friend through everything that happens and maintains her humanity and kindness to others throughout.

=== Cordelia Chase ===
- Portrayed by Charisma Carpenter (seasons 1–3)

Cordelia is originally an archetypal popular, shallow, mean-spirited cheerleader. She is tactless, but direct and honest, and she becomes a reluctant ally of the Scooby Gang, even after her relationship with Xander disintegrates. After season 3, she joins Angel in L.A., where she abandons her attempts at acting to fight evil at his side.

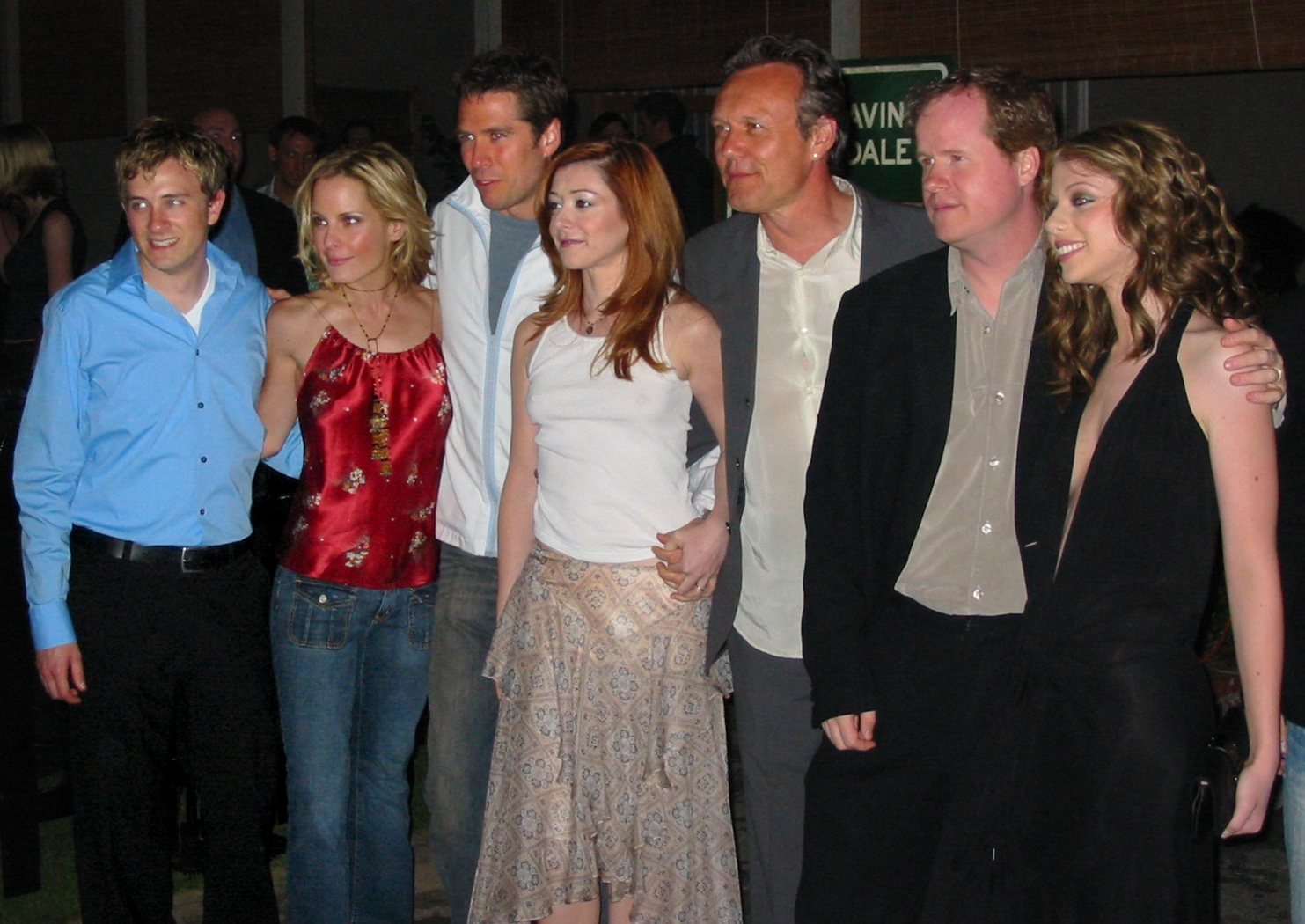
Tom Lenk, Emma Caulfield, Alexis Denisof, Alyson Hannigan, Anthony Stewart Head, Joss Whedon, Michelle Trachtenberg

=== Rupert Giles ===
- Portrayed by Anthony Stewart Head

Giles, rarely referred to by his first name, is a Watcher and a member of the Watchers' Council, whose job is to train Slayers. In the earlier seasons, Giles researched the supernatural creatures that Buffy must face, offered insights into their origins and advice on how to kill them. Throughout the series, he became a father-figure to Buffy, Willow, Xander, and the others, giving them advice not only on the supernatural world, but on life issues as well.

=== Angel ===
- Portrayed by David Boreanaz (seasons 1–5, 7)

Angel, a vampire, formerly known as Angelus, was a cruel killer until he was re-ensouled by a Romani curse. After decades of guilt over his past atrocities, he allies himself with Buffy and they fall in love. The consummation of their relationship brings him a moment of true happiness, breaking the curse and releasing Angelus upon Sunnydale. Buffy is forced to send him to a hell dimension to save the world. After his release from hell, Buffy and Angel continue to struggle with their ongoing love. Angel breaks off their relationship and moves to L.A. (after season 3) to give her a chance at a more normal life. There, he gathers new allies in his own fight against evil in the five-season spin-off, Angel.

=== Oz ===
- Portrayed by Seth Green (seasons 2–4)

Daniel "Oz" Osbourne is a brilliant yet generally unmotivated student and part-time rock guitarist. He is Willow's first and only boyfriend and an active member of Buffy's inner circle, despite the fact that he has recently become a werewolf. Portrayed as taciturn and unflappable, the contrast between his outward coolness and his violent animal episodes is an example of the show's efforts to subvert usual character expectations, as well as to display double-personalities (like Angel/Angelus). As an unusual side-note, the actor Seth Green went on to co-design and supervise the creation of the acclaimed line of Buffy the Vampire Slayer action figures.

=== Spike ===
- Portrayed by James Marsters (seasons 2–7)

William "Spike" Pratt is a vampire character whose role varies dramatically through the course of the series, ranging from a major villain to "love's bitch", to the sarcastic comic relief, to Buffy's romantic interest in a relationship that grows from miserable lust to a friendship, and eventually to a self-sacrificing hero, dying as a Champion at the Hellmouth. His path to redemption subsequently resumes in L.A. (in season five of Angel), where his resurrected character continues to develop into a selfless hero and reconciles with his former nemesis and love rival, Angel, and occasionally works with him. Spike is known for his Billy Idol platinum hair (Buffy mentions in one episode that Spike doesn't style his hair like Idol's, but the other way around), his catch-phrase "bloody hell", and his black leather duster, which he acquired after killing his second Slayer. In Season 4, he was captured by the Initiative and had a chip implanted in his brain to prevent him from hurting humans. In Season 6, he underwent a trial in order to remove the chip, instead he had his soul restored. After accidentally killing a human in Season 7, the chip nearly killed him and he had it medically removed.

=== Anya Jenkins ===
- Portrayed by Emma Caulfield (seasons 3–7)

Anya is a 1,120-year-old former vengeance demon (Anyanka) who specialized in avenging scorned women. After being forcibly stripped of her demonic powers by Giles, the character is forced to re-learn how to be an ordinary human, a journey which is portrayed as both comical (e.g., her fear of rabbits and her love of money) and poignant (e.g. her grief over Joyce's death). Her story is largely focused on her romantic relationship with Xander, and like many characters on the show, she is portrayed as morally ambivalent.

=== Riley Finn ===
- Portrayed by Marc Blucas (seasons 4–6)

Riley is Buffy's first serious boyfriend after Angel. He is initially an operative in a military organization called "The Initiative" that uses science and military technology to hunt down HSTs or "hostile sub-terrestrials" (demons). Riley is Angel's opposite, an Iowa-born-and-raised man whose strength lies in his military secret identity. Buffy's superior physical strength causes him insecurity, particularly after his medically enhanced powers were removed. This, combined with Buffy's inability to truly emotionally connect with him, eventually causes him to leave in the middle of Season 5.

=== Dawn Summers ===
- Portrayed by Michelle Trachtenberg (seasons 5–7)

Dawn is introduced in Season 5 as Buffy's fourteen-year-old younger sister, sent to Buffy in human form as a disguise for the Key, a dangerous magical artifact sought by a hellgod. Although Dawn's genesis is magical, she functions as a complete and normal teenage girl, and, after her true nature has been revealed, she is accepted and loved as a sister, daughter, and friend. Although Buffy initially tries to shelter Dawn from her work as Slayer, Dawn later becomes a useful member of the Scooby Gang.

=== Tara Maclay ===
- Portrayed by Amber Benson (seasons 4–6)

Tara is introduced first as a fellow member of a Wicca group during Willow's first year of college. Their close friendship evolves into an ongoing romantic relationship; their relationship attracted significant attention as one of few featured same-sex relationships on television at that time. Tara uses her magical skills to assist the Scooby Gang in their fight against evil, and she struggles with how to deal with Willow's growing addiction to magic. Tara is killed by a bullet intended for Buffy, her death triggering Willow's transformation into "Dark Willow".

== Supporting characters ==
=== Introduced in season one (1997) ===
- The Master, portrayed by Mark Metcalf (seasons 1, 2, 3, 7): The Master is one of the oldest living vampires, and the first Big Bad that Buffy faces in Sunnydale. The Master was trapped in a church which collapsed in an earthquake and he became trapped in the Hellmouth when he tried to open it. Prophecy foretells that he will kill Buffy; he bites her and she drowns, but is revived by Xander. She kills him, and he turns to dust, leaving only his bones. When she is faced with the threat of his resurrection, Buffy later smashes them with a sledgehammer. The Master appears again in the season 3 episode "The Wish", which is set in an alternative reality where Buffy never came to Sunnydale. He is resurrected in season 8 by the Seed of Wonder to protect it.
- Joyce Summers, portrayed by Kristine Sutherland: Buffy's mother is an anchor of normality in the Scoobies' lives, even after she learns of Buffy's role in the supernatural world ("Becoming, Part Two"). In "Lovers Walk", she lends a sympathetic ear to Spike's heartbreak, a gesture that he never forgot. In season 5, she dies of an aneurysm after a tumor is removed from her brain in "I Was Made to Love You". (In the first episode of season 4, Buffy jokes "Can't wait till mom gets the bill for these books; I hope it's a funny aneurysm.") Joyce is one of the only two Buffyverse deaths from natural (neither magical nor violent) causes. She returns for one Season 6 episode, "Normal Again", as a hallucination (or possibly as herself in an alternate reality). She also returns in some Season 7 episodes, either as a manifestation of The First Evil or as a ghost.
- Darla, portrayed by Julie Benz (seasons 1–2, 5)
- The Anointed One/Collin, portrayed by Andrew J. Ferchland (seasons 1–2)
- Jenny Calendar, portrayed by Robia LaMorte (seasons 1–3): High school computer teacher, whose real name is Janna Kalderash. She becomes Giles' love interest and a mentor to Willow. In the episodes "Surprise" and "Innocence", it is revealed that she is a descendant of the Romani tribe who cursed Angelus by restoring his soul, and is in Sunnydale to watch and try to prevent the development of the relationship between Angel and Buffy so that Angel continues to suffer. After Angel loses his soul, she tries to find a way to restore it, but is killed by Angelus in "Passion" just as she's figured out how to do it. Jenny Calendar was the first prominent character to be killed in the series (although the recurring character Principal Flutie had been killed in Season 1), and Joss Whedon noted the significance of this as a sign of his seriousness about emphasizing the genuine danger his characters are in. She returns in season 3, but as the First Evil, who has assumed her form.
- Principal Bob Flutie, portrayed by Ken Lerner (season 1): the principal of Sunnydale High at the start of the series. He allowed Buffy to attend his school despite learning of the arson that got her expelled from her last school. He kept tabs on her to prevent any mischief. He was killed and devoured by a group of hyena-like beings.
- Principal R. Snyder, portrayed by Armin Shimerman (seasons 1–4): He was made principal after Flutie was killed. He was far more stern and strict compared to Flutie and was shown to be narcissistic. He was killed by the Mayor who was in Giant Snake form in Season 3.
- Harmony Kendall, portrayed by Mercedes McNab (seasons 1–5): A vapid high school companion to Cordelia Chase, who becomes a humorously inept vampire in later seasons, and goes on to be a regular character on Angel. Harmony is the only character other than Angel to appear in both the first episode of Buffy and the final episode of Angel. Additionally, she appears in the unaired Buffy pilot. She returns again in Season 8, where she informs everyone that vampires exist on her reality show.
- Amy Madison, portrayed by Elizabeth Anne Allen (seasons 1–4, 6–7): A student at Sunnydale High and witch who encounters the gang. Later Amy turns herself into a rat to save herself from being burned at the stake and is stuck in this form for a few seasons until season six (with the exception of a few seconds in season four when Willow unknowingly turns Amy from rat to human then back to rat). She ultimately resents the Scoobies for how they treat and handle Willow after she goes "bad", yet cannot seem to have the same sympathy for her. She ultimately betrays Willow in Season 7. In the Dark Horse comic book series "Season 8", she takes on the role as a big bad in the first arc, partnered up with her "boyfriend" (Warren Mears) to seek revenge on Willow and Buffy.
- Jesse McNally, portrayed by Eric Balfour (season 1) is Xander Harris' best friend and has a crush on Cordelia Chase. He is turned into a vampire to lure Buffy to the Master, but is later staked by Xander.
- Hank Summers, portrayed by Dean Butler (seasons 1–2, 5–6): Buffy's father.

=== Introduced in season two (1997–1998) ===
- Drusilla, portrayed by Juliet Landau (seasons 2, 5, 7): Drusilla is a beautiful young seer who was driven insane by Angelus, her sire and later her lover. Her insanity continued after she became a vampire, and she wreaked havoc on Europe and Asia for years. After a debilitating beating from an angry mob in Prague, Drusilla is healed in a ritual that nearly sacrifices Angel; when he reverts to Angelus, she embraces his plot to destroy the world. Drusilla is the long-time paramour and sire of Spike, although she becomes disillusioned with him after their year in Sunnydale (Season 2). She has clairvoyance and hypnotic powers in addition to her vampire abilities. She frequently speaks in riddles (relating what the pixies in her head tell her) and watches the stars through the ceiling. She reappears in various guises throughout the series. She is still at large.
- Jonathan Levinson, portrayed by Danny Strong (seasons 2–4, 6–7): A hapless high school nobody, introduced in the second season and frequently included in brief comic appearances in seasons 2–3; featured heavily in the noteworthy episodes "Earshot" and "Superstar". In Season 4 after his High School years, he discovered he had Warlock powers. He becomes major character and antagonist in season 6, when he teams up with Warren Mears and Andrew Wells using his Wiccan gift to take over Sunnydale and defeat Buffy. He is killed by Andrew early in season seven as a sacrifice to open the Hellmouth.
- Kendra Young, portrayed by Bianca Lawson (season 2): A slayer that was called, after Buffy's short-termed death in the season one finale. She ends up getting killed by Drusilla. She appears in both two-part episodes, "What's My Line?" and "Becoming". She is succeeded by Faith Lehane.
- Larry Blaisdell, portrayed by Larry Bagby (seasons 2–3) first appears as a stereotypical sexist high school bully. When Buffy and her friends search for a werewolf in Sunnydale, they realize that Larry is hiding something. Xander finds out that Larry hides that he is gay, which leads to Larry's coming out. Later, Larry tells Xander he is comfortable with his sexual identity and that his grandmother tries to find a boyfriend for him. Larry turns out to be a good guy fighting for the good. He is killed by the Mayor in the season three finale. Larry is the first openly gay character in the tv shows created by Joss Whedon.
- Devon MacLeish, portrayed by Jason Hall (seasons 2–4)
- Ethan Rayne, portrayed by Robin Sachs (seasons 2–4)
- Chantarelle/Lily/Anne Steele, portrayed by Julia Lee (seasons 2–3) first appears as Chantarelle, a woman who wants to become a vampire. She is saved from the vampires by Buffy (Buffy S2E7 "Lie to Me"). Later she calls herself Lily and lives in L.A. with her boyfriend Rickie. There she also meets Buffy, who has left Sunnydale and works there as the waitress Anne. Buffy saves Lily from monsters once again. Then Lily takes over Buffy's second name, Anne (Buffy S3E1 "Anne"), following which she works in a shelter for teen runaways and calls herself Anne Steele. (Angel S2E12 "Blood Money", S2E14 "The Thin Dead Line" & S5E22 "Not Fade Away"). In her part of growing up, Anne changes her identity and name several times until she finally feels comfortable to remain in her chosen role. The script of the Buffy episode "Lie to Me" reveals her original name to be Joan Appleby.
- Willy the Snitch, portrayed by Saverio Guerra (seasons 2–4)
- Merrick portrayed by Donald Sutherland (movie) and Richard Riehle (series) is Buffy's first watcher. He first appeared in the Buffy the Vampire Slayer movie where he is helping Buffy killing the first vampires. The vampire Lothos kills him, to turn Merrick into a vampire. Merrick stakes himself, so that he doesn't become a danger to Buffy. In the series he appears in a flashback, in the season two finale, where he tells Buffy about vampires. Joss Whedon announced that he didn't like the film Merrick who was portrayed by Donald Sutherland, he preferred the Merrick from the series portrayed by Richard Riehle. Later Merrick reappeared in the Buffy comic book The Origin where the character was based on Richard Riehle's appearance and performance. In the comic book, Merrick's character resembles Giles and becomes a fatherly figure to Buffy. In the Buffy novels Slayer and Chosen by Kiersten White, Merrick is the father of the slayer and main character Nina as well as her twin sister, Artemis.

=== Introduced in season three (1998–1999) ===
- Mr. Trick, portrayed by K. Todd Freeman (season 3)
- Scott Hope, portrayed by Fab Filippo (season 3)
- Faith Lehane, portrayed by Eliza Dushku (seasons 3–4, 7): Faith, a Slayer, is called when Kendra is killed by the vampire Drusilla. When she arrives in Sunnydale, she fights alongside Buffy and the Scooby Gang. After accidentally committing murder, she indulges her violent tendencies and joins forces with the Mayor. Buffy stabs Faith, who falls into a coma; eight months later she wakes up and swaps bodies with Buffy. After being defeated, she flees to Los Angeles and accepts a contract to kill Angel. Angel is able to rehabilitate her, and she confesses to her crimes and goes to prison. Three years later, she breaks out to capture Angelus when Wesley Wyndam-Pryce informs her that he has been released. After Angel is re-ensouled, Faith reluctantly returns to Sunnydale to stand with Buffy against the First Evil. She temporarily leads both the Scoobies and the Potentials when the general faith in Buffy dissolves. Throughout the series, Faith displays a much darker, dangerously fun-seeking approach to both slaying and murder; she is the dark side of a Slayer's personality.
- Mayor Richard Wilkins III, portrayed by Harry Groener (seasons 3–4, 7): The affable yet sinister Mayor Wilkins founded the city of Sunnydale on the Hellmouth as a haven for demons to feed. He sold his soul in the 19th century so that he could eventually ascend to pure demon form. Buffy and the Scoobies face the threat of his impending Ascension in Season 3.
- Wesley Wyndam-Pryce, portrayed by Alexis Denisof (season 3): A second Watcher originally sent to replace Giles. Fired as a watcher, he appears in Los Angeles on Angel as a "rogue demon hunter", and becomes Angel Investigations' expert in occult lore.
- Quentin Travers, portrayed by Harris Yulin (seasons 3, 5, 7)
- D'Hoffryn, portrayed by Andy Umberger (season 3–4, 6–7)
- The First Evil, portrayed by various actors (seasons 3, 7): The source and embodiment of all that is evil. It can appear in the form of anyone who has died (including Buffy or any vampire). In the final season, it attempted to eliminate not only Buffy and Faith, but every Potential Slayer on Earth, with the help of Caleb and an army of Turok-Han "ubervamps".

=== Introduced in season four (1999–2000) ===
- Professor Maggie Walsh, portrayed by Lindsay Crouse (season 4): Walsh is Buffy's psychology professor and the leader of The Initiative. She deceives Riley and tries to kill Buffy when Buffy asks too many questions about her secret project. She is stabbed and killed by her own creation, Adam, and her body is later re-animated.
- Olivia Williams, portrayed by Phina Oruche (season 4)
- Parker Abrams, portrayed by Adam Kaufman (season 4)
- Veruca, portrayed by Paige Moss (season 4)
- Graham Miller, portrayed by Bailey Chase (seasons 4–5): One of Riley's peers in the Initiative.
- Forrest Gates, portrayed by Leonard Roberts (season 4): One of Riley's peers in the Initiative.
- Adam, portrayed by George Hertzberg (seasons 4, 7): Adam is a part-cyborg, part-demon, part-human creation of The Initiative (under Maggie Walsh). He has no conscience, and he is violently curious in how things work, killing in order to study his victims' bodies. He is nearly unstoppable, and he plans to create a supreme race of Human/Demon/Android hybrids. Buffy eventually defeats him by ripping out the uranium core that powers him.
- First Slayer, portrayed by Sharon Ferguson (seasons 4–5, 7)

=== Introduced in season five (2000–2001) ===
- Ben (also Benjamin Wilkinson), portrayed by Charlie Weber (season 5)
- Glory, portrayed by Clare Kramer (seasons 5, 7): Glory, also known as "the great and wonderful Glorificus", is an evil hellgod who has been exiled from her dimension by other hellgods. She is forced to occupy the body of a human named Ben, which reduces her powers. She regularly becomes disoriented and unstable and must drain the minds of humans in order to maintain her cognitive processes, leaving her human victims insane. She seeks the Key to return to her home dimension, not caring that her actions threaten to destroy the fabric of reality separating all dimensions.
- Jinx, portrayed by Troy Blendell (season 5)
- Doc, portrayed by Joel Grey (season 5)
- Murk, portrayed by Todd Duffey (season 5)
- Warren Mears, portrayed by Adam Busch (seasons 5–7): The leader of "the Trio", the main villains in the 6th season before Dark Willow becomes the actual "Big Bad". He first appears to be a fairly normal nerd, but becomes a violent, power-driven timebomb who tries to gain respect by instilling fear in others. He commits evil deeds such as killing his girlfriend Katrina after his unsuccessful rape attempt. He also shoots Buffy and (accidentally) kills Tara in Buffy's own backyard. Warren is tortured, skinned alive and killed by Dark Willow ("Villains"). He later appears in Season 8, resurrected by Amy Madison (though still skinless), and seeks revenge on Buffy and Willow.
- Halfrek/Cecily Addams/Cecily Underwood, portrayed by Kali Rocha (seasons 5–7)
- Katrina Silber, portrayed by Amelinda Embry (seasons 5–6)
- Dracula, portrayed by Rudolf Martin (season 5) is a vampire, that Buffy meets in season five. When Buffy questions her identity, Dracula shows her her own darkness, claiming that "darkness" is her "gift". He envisions her as a vampire. Originally Dracula was planned to be just another "cool" vampire "who rode a horse". But then script writer Marti Noxon and Joss Whedon realized, that this vampire could also be Dracula.
- Nikki Wood, portrayed by April Weeden (season 5) and K. D. Aubert (season 7) is a Slayer in the 1970s. She is the mother of Robin Wood and is killed by the vampire Spike. Joss Whedon mentioned that he has based Nikki Wood's first appearance in the subway on the fictional character Blade by Marvel Comics.

=== Introduced in season six (2001–2002) ===
- Andrew Wells, portrayed by Tom Lenk (seasons 6–7): A nerd who becomes a foe of Buffy, mainly through peer pressure, bad judgment, and a secret love for Warren Mears. After he's captured and held by the Scooby Gang, he eventually starts helping. He does try to redeem himself throughout season seven. There are several humorous hints that he is gay. His character continues to grow and develop after the end of the seventh season of Buffy, as evidenced by his guest appearances on Angel. During Season 8, he resides in Italy being the Watcher of many vampire slayers. Buffy calls Andrew part of the family in Predators and Prey, Part 3.
- Clem, portrayed by James Charles Leary (seasons 6–7)

=== Introduced in season seven (2002–2003) ===
- Principal Robin Wood, portrayed by D. B. Woodside (season 7): The son of a past Slayer, Nikki Wood (killed by Spike), who becomes a Buffy ally in the final season. He becomes the love interest of Faith. Robin is the only principal of the newly rebuilt Sunnydale High School when Buffy's sister Dawn begins her sophomore year. Buffy wonders if he may be evil, but accepts his job offer. Hints are dropped that Robin is aware of the mystical situation in Sunnydale — he finds and buries Jonathan Levinson's body, for example. Robin's easygoing attitude and confidence are in contrast to previous principals depicted as nervous (Principal Flutie) and excessively disciplinarian (Principal Snyder). However, in "Him", troubled student RJ Brooks develops a resentment towards Robin, leading to Buffy, under RJ's family's love spell, trying to kill him with a rocket launcher, though he is saved by Xander, Willow and Spike. In "First Date", it is revealed that Robin's mother, Nikki Wood (first seen in "Fool for Love"), was a Slayer in New York, and that he is a "freelance" demon fighter. His mother was killed by a vampire; he learns from the First Evil that this is Spike. Robin conspires with Giles to kill Spike, but the plan fails, temporarily alienating Robin from the group. After Faith's return, Robin becomes interested in Faith; the two become physically intimate in "Touched". Robin did not inherit any powers from his mother. He was, however, trained in the martial arts and various vampire-killing tactics by his mother's former Watcher. Robin appears in "No Future for You", the second arc of the canonical comic series Buffy the Vampire Slayer Season Eight. Robin is in charge of a squad of slayers working at the Hellmouth in Cleveland.
- Amanda, portrayed by Sarah Hagan (season 7)
- Ubervamp, portrayed by Camden Toy (season 7)
- Kennedy, portrayed by Iyari Limon (season 7): One of the Potential Slayers who comes to Sunnydale during the last season. She comes from a rich background, freely describing herself as a brat, and is openly gay, becoming Willow's second girlfriend. As a result of this and being the oldest and most well-trained, she sometimes takes on a leadership role among the Potentials and consults with the Scooby Gang apart from them. She is among those activated as a Slayer in the series finale.
- Molly, portrayed by Clara Bryant (season 7)
- Rona, portrayed by Indigo (season 7)
- Vi, portrayed by Felicia Day (season 7)
- Chao-Ahn, portrayed by Kristy Wu (season 7)
- Caleb, portrayed by Nathan Fillion (season 7): An arrogant, misogynistic preacher who served as a vessel and agent of the First Evil. He is emasculated and sliced in two by Buffy in the series' finale "Chosen".
- Shannon, portrayed by Mary Wilcher (season 7)
- Caridad, portrayed by Dania Ramirez (season 7)
- Cassandra "Cassie" Newton, portrayed by Azura Skye (season 7) is a student at Sunnydale High School, that Buffy meets during her work as a school counselor. Cassie tells Buffy that she foresees her own death. Buffy tries to prevent it, but just when it seems like Buffy has saved Cassie, the girl dies. Her death makes Buffy realize that she cannot save everyone, no matter how hard she tries, because she is human, regardless of her powers and destiny against life-and-death threats. Cassie's death also made a big impression on the audience, being remembered as one of the most brutal deaths in Buffy the Vampire Slayer. Cassie's website, which included her poetry and was shown in the series, existed in real life. The poetry was written by Rebecca Rand Kirshner.
- Chloe, portrayed by Lalaine (season 7)

=== Introduced in seasons eight to twelve (2011–2018) ===
- Renee (Season 8)
- Simone Doffler (Season 8)
- Satsu (Season 8)
- Severin the Siphon (Season 8) first shows up in season eight's final storyarc as an evil looking "guy in John Lennon glasses". He becomes a main villain in season 9. Artist Georges Jeanty had modelled him after the young Professor X in X-Men: First Class.
- Maloker (Season 9)
- Joanna Wise (Season 11)
- Melaka Fray (Fray)
- Harth Fray (Fray)

== Notable villains ==
The following characters are commonly referred to within the show as Big Bads, usually the principal antagonist for a season, though some seasons have multiple Big Bads.

The sixth season documentaries often refer not only to Dark Willow as the season's Big Bad, but life itself.

- Season 1: The Master
- Season 2: Spike, Drusilla, Angelus
- Season 3: Mayor Wilkins, Mr. Trick, Faith
- Season 4: Professor Maggie Walsh, Adam
- Season 5: Glory
- Season 6: The Trio (Warren Mears, Jonathan Levinson, Andrew Wells), Dark Willow
- Season 7: The First Evil, Caleb

== See also ==
- List of Buffyverse villains and supernatural beings
