= Kennedy (Buffy the Vampire Slayer) =

Fictional character from Buffy the Vampire Slayer

- Buffy the Vampire Slayer character
- Iyari Limon as Kennedy
- First appearance: "Bring On the Night" (2002)
- Last appearance: New Rules, Part Two (2014)
- Created by: Joss Whedon
- Portrayed by: Iyari Limon

In-universe information
- Classification: Potential Slayer (season 7); Slayer ("Chosen", comic books)

Kennedy is a fictional character from the television series Buffy the Vampire Slayer introduced during its seventh and final season. She later appears in the Buffy the Vampire Slayer comic book series, which continues the story of the television series. Portrayed by Iyari Limon, Kennedy is depicted as a confident Potential Slayer, (Note: Potential Slayers are girls who might become endowed with supernatural abilities, destined to battle evil creatures such as vampires and demons. They are activated after a Slayer, such as protagonist Buffy Summers, dies.) She begins a relationship with Willow; their sex scene became the first lesbian sex scene shown on broadcast television. In the comics, Kennedy and Willow struggle with their relationship, eventually ending it. Afterwards, Kennedy starts a private security firm that employs Slayers. Buffy the Vampire Slayer's creator, Joss Whedon, conceived Kennedy to contrast Willow's deceased girlfriend, Tara, and explore her character arc of moving on following her grief. Kennedy has been negatively received by fans and critics, who disliked her abrasive, bratty personality; her relationship with Willow has been referred to as one of the worst in television history by journalists.

== Appearances ==
=== Television ===
In the seventh season of Buffy the Vampire Slayer, Kennedy, a Potential Slayer, arrives in Sunnydale after her Watcher is murdered by Bringers, lackeys of the First Evil. Kennedy comes from a wealthy family in New York City. She is immediately interested in having a romantic relationship with Willow when the two meet, and later tricks Willow into going on a date with her. After they kiss, Willow takes the appearance of and begins behaving like Warren, who she killed in the previous season as vengeance for his murder of her girlfriend, Tara. It is later revealed that Amy, a witch, put a hex on Willow. Willow starts to reenact the attack that resulted in Tara's death, but Kennedy talks her down. Willow tearfully explains that when Kennedy kissed her she let go of Tara's memory for a moment, making her truly dead. Kennedy kisses Willow again, breaking the spell. Later, Kennedy oversees the Potentials' training to battle the First Evil. She gains first-hand understanding of Willow's magical abilities when she drains a significant portion of her life force to reopen a portal that Buffy entered. This puts a strain on their relationship until they talk and reconcile. Before the battle against the First Evil, the two have sex. In the series finale, she supports Willow in magically activating all Potential Slayers. Afterwards, she joins Buffy and the other Potentials in the final battle as a fully activated Slayer.

=== Literature ===
Anti-clockwise from top left: Vi, Kennedy, Willow and Buffy in the variant cover of "Time of Your Life" part 1

In the story titled "The Long Way Home, Part III" of Buffy the Vampire Slayer Season Eight (2007–2011), an in-canon comic book series, Willow reveals to Buffy that Kennedy suffered a short-lived mystical death that impeded their relationship. In a flashback in "Anywhere but Here", Kennedy expressed worry that Willow kept her away from Buffy's inner circle because she was ashamed of her. Willow explained that she blames herself for Tara's death because she kept her close to Buffy, and that she would not let that happen to Kennedy. They reunite in "Time of Your Life", in which Buffy is accidentally sent to the future and Kennedy helps Willow bring her back. Willow remains distant, partly because of her sexual relationship with her magical mentor, the demon Aluwyn. Kennedy antagonizes Buffy when she learns of her affair with the Slayer Satsu, fearful that she will pursue Willow romantically, and later helps Satsu get over Buffy. In "Retreat", Kennedy fights alongside Buffy against the Big Bad, Twilight. In its aftermath, after Buffy's actions have brought about the end of magic, Willow, who is in turmoil as a result of the loss of her powers and her connection to Aluwyn, breaks up with Kennedy.

In the comic book series Buffy the Vampire Slayer Season Nine (2011–2013), Buffy joins Kennedy's private security firm that employs Slayers, and it becomes apparent that their client is on the run from the demonic law firm Wolfram & Hart. Buffy and Kennedy defeat the threat, and though Buffy quits the job, Kennedy pays her a significant amount. Later, now a millionaire, she sends Buffy a private jet so that she, Xander, and Willow are able to fly to save Dawn's life. Kennedy recurs in the second volume of Angel & Faith (2014–2016), as well as in crossover scenes in the first two issues of Buffy the Vampire Slayer Season Ten. In "Where the River Meets the Sea," she recruits Faith as bodyguard. However, the younger Slayers resent Faith, who has difficulties with the business taking on demons as clients. As Faith is about to quit, however, Kennedy offers her a mission to find Riley Finn, who has gone missing in South America. Following the successful mission, Faith leaves the company.

== Development ==
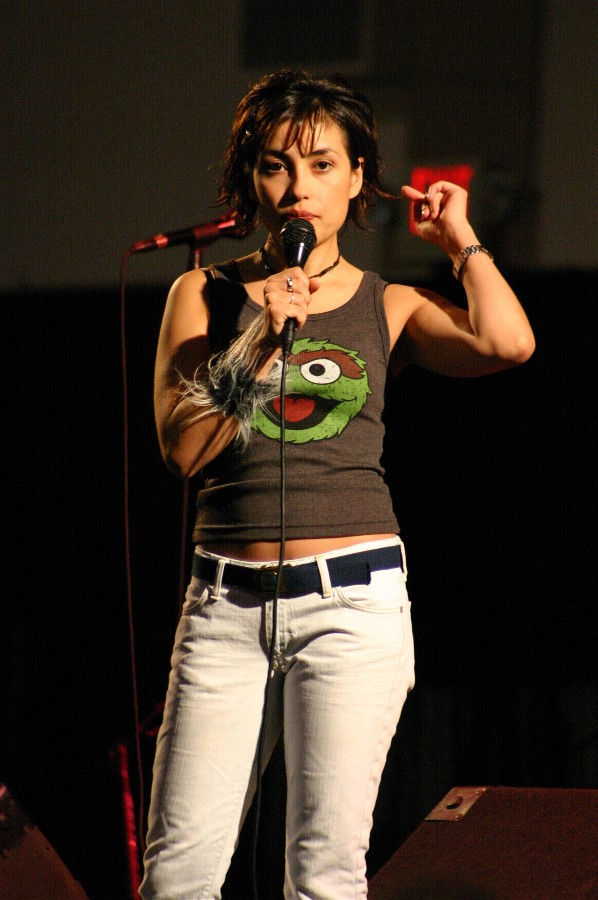
Actress Iyari Limon (pictured in 2004) portrays Kennedy.

Kennedy was portrayed by Iyari Limon; she appears as a recurring guest star in 13 episodes of Buffy the Vampire Slayer. The Potentials' arc was intended to mirror Buffy's in the first two seasons, with them being trained and readied for their destinies. They were written to allow the show's main characters to reflect on their pasts and how they had evolved. Initially, series creator Joss Whedon planned for the seventh season to feature Tara in flashbacks before having her return at the end of the show, establishing her as the Willow's "one true love". However, her actress, Amber Benson, had other commitments and declined to return. As a result, Whedon pivoted to a character arc about moving on for Willow, which he referred to as the "only option"; he did not want her to be "stuck in typical gay celibacy on TV". The writing team wanted to explore where one's life would go following significant grief through Willow's character. Thus, they introduced Kennedy to symbolize that moving on is essential and that one's life must continue. Whedon created Kennedy as "an anti-Tara" whose personality was as dissimilar as possible. While Tara was "very reticent", Kennedy was written as far more experienced in dealing with her sexuality than Willow and "totally confident". Director David Solomon asserted that it would have been "insulting" and "weird" for Willow and Kennedy's relationship to replicate prior arcs. According to Whedon, Kennedy was used to explore Willow's emotional matters, such as her fear of power. Willow and Kennedy's sex scene was the first lesbian sex scene shown on broadcast television.

== Reception ==
Fans found Kennedy's personality abrasive and bratty. Entertainment Weekly named her one of the "Most Annoying TV Characters Ever", while BuzzFeed listed her as one of the "10 Most Hated Lesbian and Bi Characters". TVLine found fault with her "bratty tendencies", arrogance, "grating sense of entitlement, and "inability to keep her mouth shut", while The A.V. Club asserted that her character is depicted as "so aggressive and un-nuanced" that Willow's attraction to her becomes implausible. Similarly, Salon.com called Kennedy a "loudmouth" and described her admiration of Willow's power, rather than her intelligence, as "obnoxious". According to Digital Spy, Kennedy "seems deliberately written as unlikeable – she's spoiled, arrogant and more interested in throwing her weight around than actually learning from Buffy". Vulture panned the seventh season for introducing many characters "in whom we have no investment in (except perhaps in hoping they get killed off, Kennedy)".

Kennedy's relationship with Willow has also received criticism, with many journalists referring to it as "forced". Willow and Kennedy have been deemed one of the worst couples in television history by TVLine, Screen Rant, and E! News. Digital Spy ranked their relationship as the Buffyverse's worst romance, panning Kennedy's aggressive advances as "uncomfortable" due to Willow's vulnerability. The Guardian said that, as a girlfriend, Kennedy is "so much lesser" compared with Tara. Paste defended their relationship as a representation of "a kind of hopefulness unique to Buffy the Vampire Slayer", since other instances of hope often have undercurrents of grief, pain, or sadness. The magazine described them as "a fundamental part of the history of lesbianism on TV" due to the significance of their sex scene.

== See also ==
- List of minor Buffy the Vampire Slayer characters
- List of women warriors in folklore
- Women warriors in literature and culture
