= Indigo (actress) =

American actress and DJ (born 1984)

- Born: Alyssa Ashley Nichols; June 25, 1984 (age 42); Los Angeles, California, United States
- Occupations: Actress, voice actress
- Years active: 1989–present
- Spouse: Jneiro Jarel (m. 2013)

Indigo (born Alyssa Ashley Nichols, June 25, 1984, Los Angeles) is an American actress and DJ. She is best known for her roles as Rona, one of the vampire slayer potentials, in the final season of the TV series Buffy the Vampire Slayer, and Vaneeta on the Showtime series Weeds, in which she was nominated for the 13th Annual Screen Actors Guild Awards, for Outstanding Ensemble in a Comedy Series.

== Personal life ==
Indigo is married to Jneiro Jarel.

== Filmography ==
Film
Year	Title	Role	Notes
1997	The Good Bad Guy	Girl	Credited as Alyssa A. Nichols
2000	Nelly's Bodega	Fatima	Credited as Alyssa Ashley Nichols
2013	Fractured	Holly	Credited as Indigo Nichols
2014	Black or White	Young Nurse	Credited as Indigo
2015	Mississippi Grind	Dora	Credited as Indigo
2015	Madea's Tough Love	Dang Dang	Credited as Indigo
Television
Year	Title	Role	Notes
1995	Zooman	Jackie	TV movie; Credited as Alyssa A. Nichols
1995–1996	Minor Adjustments	Julie	5 episodes; Credited as Alyssa A. Nichols
1996	Sister, Sister	Agnes	Episode: "Summer Bummer"; Credited as Alyssa A. Nichols
1998	Chicago Hope	Cherise Martin	Episode: "McNeil and Pray"; Credited as Alyssa Ashley Nichols
2000	Any Day Now	April Gregory	6 episodes; Credited as Alyssa Ashley Nichols
2001	NYPD Blue	Sylvia Dobkin	Episode: "Everyone Into the Poole"; Credited as Alyssa Ashley Nichols
2001	Judging Amy	Girl at Sanctuary House	Episode: "The Right Thing to Do"; Uncredited
2002	Crossing Jordan	Keisha	Episode: "Someone to Count On"
2002–2003	Boston Public	Cheyenne Webb	6 episodes
2003	Girlfriends	Red Beans	Episode: "Take This Poem and Call Me in the Morning"
2003	Buffy the Vampire Slayer	Rona	8 episodes
2003	10-8: Officers on Duty	Tisha Graves	Episode: "Brothers in Arms"
2004	Strong Medicine	Mikela Johnson	Episode: "Bleeding Heart"
2004	Cold Case	Tyra	Episode: "The Badlands"
2005–2007	Weeds	Vaneeta	24 episodes
2005–2006	Family Guy	Esther/Gloria the Hippo	Episodes: "Don't Make Me Over" Esther (voice) "Petarded" Esther (voice) "Hell Comes to Quahog" Gloria the Hippo (voice)
2006	CSI: Crime Scene Investigation	Cha Cha Romero	Episode: "Fannysmackin'"
2007	State of Mind	Charisma	Episode: "Lost & Found"
2007	Journeyman	Emily	Episode: "Emily"
2009	Curious George	Vinny	Episodes: "Ski Monkey/George the Grocer", "Curious George, Personal Trainer/Sprout Outing"
2011	Memphis Beat	Devon	Episode: "Body of Evidence"
2011	Burn Notice	Dolly	Episode: "Breaking Point"
2011	Weather Wars	Chloe	TV movie
2011–2012	Treme	A.D.A. Brigitte Baron	6 episodes
2012	Common Law	Rozelle	12 episodes
2014	Star-Crossed	Miss Jacobs	Pilot
2015	Bloodline	Gwen Girard	4 Episodes
