= Sarah Hagan =

American actress

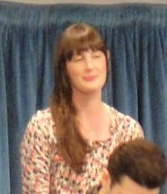
- Hagan at 2011 PaleyFest
- Born: Austin, Texas, U.S.
- Occupation: Actress
- Years active: 1997–present
- Known for: Buffy the Vampire Slayer; Freaks and Geeks
- Website: www.sarahhagan.com

Sarah Hagan is an American television and film actress. She is known for playing Millie Kentner in the show, Freaks and Geeks.

== Life and career ==
Hagan has been acting since the age of six, when her mother first signed her up for musical theater.

Hagan was first involved with theater companies such as Houston's Playhouse 1960, the Houston Grand Opera (where she sang in the children's chorus), the Crighton Playhouse, the Houston Music Hall and the Bitter Truth Theater. From there, she made her screen debut in the 1997 feature film Faith, where she played the title character at age 13; her TV debut came on an episode of the Calista Flockhart series Ally McBeal in 1999.

Hagan's first major break came when she was cast in a recurring role as Millie Kentner on the short-lived NBC cult TV series Freaks and Geeks (1999–2000). Following that show's cancellation, she was cast on the David Alan Grier NBC sitcom DAG, where she was originally slated to play Camilla Whitman, daughter of the US President; however, the role of Camilla was recast when the pilot episode was revamped before airing.

Following the lead of several fellow Freaks and Geeks cast members, Hagan then appeared in an episode of the short-lived Fox sitcom Undeclared in 2001. Her next roles were a bit part in the Jack Black movie Orange County and a guest role as Melissa in Boston Public in 2002. After that, she was cast as Amanda in the seventh and final season of the hit cult series Buffy the Vampire Slayer.

In later TV roles, Hagan appeared on the ABC medical drama Grey's Anatomy as Devo, a teenage girl whose religious beliefs conflict with getting treatment for a heart condition she was diagnosed with; she appeared on the NBC drama Medium, playing a character named Suzannah, a friend of Allison's (Patricia Arquette) who appeared in two dreams flashing back to Allison's teen years; and she played the role of Patricia on an episode of the CBS legal drama Close to Home. She made her first venture into animation in 2007 when she played the voices of Lola Llama and Jungle Girl on two episodes of the Cartoon Network series My Gym Partner's a Monkey.

Hagan next appeared in the direct-to-DVD Warner Bros. comedy feature Spring Breakdown. She appeared in the role of Sandy in the NCIS episode "Seek".

== Filmography ==
=== Film ===
Year	Title	Role	Notes	Ref.
1997	Faith	Faith at 13	Debut film	
2000	Architecture of Reassurance	Susan	Short film	
2002	Orange County	Sarah		
2009	Someday We Will Get Married	Jenny	Short film	
2009	Spring Breakdown	Truvy		
2010	Starter Home	Claire	Short film	
2011	The Bride of Frank	The Bride / Emma	Short film	
2011	Jess + Moss	Jess		
2012	The Most Fun I've Ever Had with My Pants On	Liv		
2013	OJ: The Musical	Dietrich		
2015	Sun Choke	Janie	Lead role	
2019	The False Mirror	Julie	Short film	
2020	Como Se Dice	Diane	Short film	
2021	Arlo the Alligator Boy	Barn Folk, Bully Kid (voices)	Animated film	
2023	Donkey	Ally	Short film	

=== Television ===
Year	Title	Role	Notes
1999	Ally McBeal	Girlfriend #3	Episode: "Love's Illusions"
1999-2000	Freaks and Geeks	Millie Kentner	Recurring role (12 episodes)
2000	DAG	Camilla Whitman	Episode: "Pilot"
2001	Undeclared	Jordanna	Episode: "Eric Visits Again"
2002	Boston Public	Melissa	Episode: "Chapter 35"
2002-2003	Buffy the Vampire Slayer	Amanda	Recurring role (10 episodes)
2004	Judging Amy	Maggie Parsons	Episode: "Christenings"
2005	Grey's Anatomy	Devo Friedman	Episode: "Save Me"
2005	Medium	Young Suzannah	Episode: "Sweet Dreams"
2007	Close to Home	Patricia	Episode: "Drink the Cup"
2007	My Gym Partner's a Monkey	Lola Llama (voice)	Episode: "Save the Drama for Your Llama"
2008	My Gym Partner's a Monkey	Jungle Girl (voice)	1 episode
2010	Private Practice	Kim	Episode: "In the Name of Love"
2011	90210	Alana	Episodes: "Greek Tragedy", "Let the Games Begin", "Party Politics", "A Thousand Words"
2012	Friend Me	Lucy	Episode: "Evan Is Now Friends with Lucy"
2013	NCIS	Sandy	Episode: "Seek"
2013–2014	Breaking Fat	Barbie	Recurring role (15 episodes)
2017	The Night Shift	Althea	Episode: "Land of the Free"
