= Iyari Limon =

Mexican and American actress

Iyari Limón
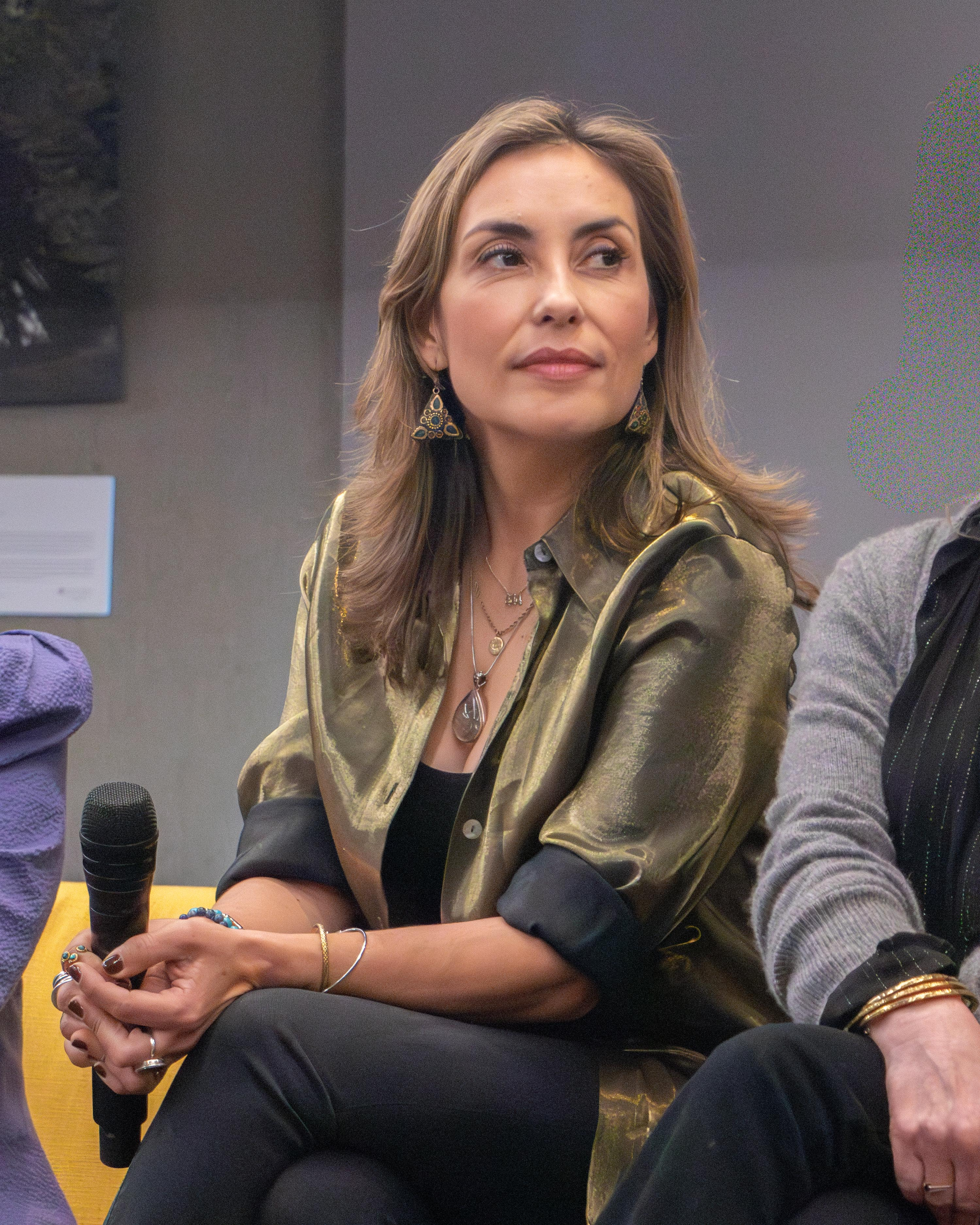
- Iyari Limon at the Whispers from the Hellmouth, April 2024 (Paris), organized by Geek'N Cheese Conventions.
- Born: Iyari Pérez Limón; Guadalajara, Jalisco, Mexico
- Spouse(s): Efren Ramirez (m. 1998; ann. 1999) Alejandro Thais (m. 2007)
- Children: 1

Iyari Pérez Limón is a Mexican and American actress, best known for her supporting role as Potential Slayer Kennedy in the 7th and final season of the television series Buffy the Vampire Slayer.

== Early life ==
Limón was born in Guadalajara, Jalisco, Mexico. She moved to Los Angeles, California, where she began her acting career.

== Career ==
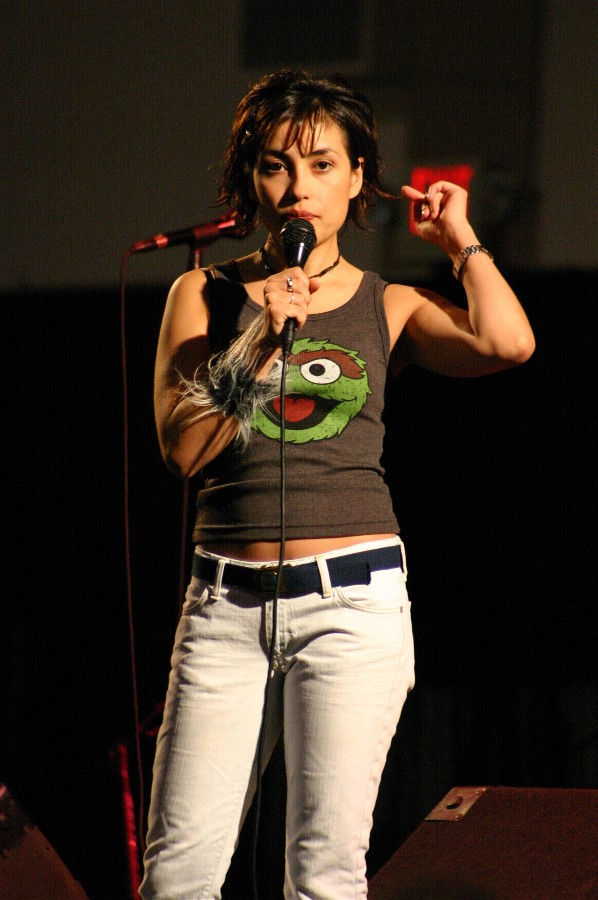
Limon at the 2004 Moonlight Rising Slayercon.

Limón has appeared in numerous TV commercials, both in Spanish and English. Among her credits are commercials for Toyota, Dr Pepper, and Always.

During her screen test for the part of Carmen Morales in The L Word, Limón ad libbed a Spanish phrase into Kate Moennig's ear ("Quiero lamerte hasta que te vengas en mi boca mil veces" - "I want to lick you until you come in my mouth a thousand times"); the phrase was written into the show and used in the series by Sarah Shahi's portrayal of the character.

Limón played Clovis Galletta in the 2011 video game L.A. Noire.

== Personal life ==
Limón came out as bisexual in an interview with the website AfterEllen.com in April 2006, in which she stated that she was once married to Napoleon Dynamite actor Efren Ramirez and was, at the time of the interview, dating DJ Sandra Edge. In September 2007, AfterEllen.com further reported that Limon and Edge had ended their relationship, and that Limon was pregnant by her boyfriend Alejandro Soltero. Limon married Alejandro Soltero and their daughter was born on August 24, 2007.

== Filmography ==
=== Film ===
Year	Title	Role	Notes
1999	King Cobra	Teen Girl	Video
2000	The Egg Plant Lady	Jamie Vecino	
2005	Death by Engagement	Erica	
2007	Maquillaje	Monica	
2008	Turok: Son of Stone	Young Catori (voice)	Video
2019	VHYes	Detective Jules	

=== Television ===
Year	Title	Role	Notes
1995	ER	Brenda	"Love Among the Ruins"
1997	On the Line	Esperanza Gomez	TV film
1998	Reyes y Rey	Lisa	"La Logica De LA Sangre"
1999–2001	Humphrey	Herself	Host for the Spanish language broadcasts
2000	Cover Me	Iris	"Beauty Marks"
2000	Undressed	Cindy	"3.13", "3.14", "3.15"
2002	Double Teamed	Zoe Gold	TV film
2002	Strong Medicine	Flaca	"Discharged"
2002	The Mind of the Married Man	Stephanie	"The Perfect Babysitter"
2002–2003	Buffy the Vampire Slayer	Kennedy	Recurring role (season 7, 13 Episodes)
2002–2003	The Brothers García	Jennifer	"Don't Judge a Book by Its Cover", "New Man on Campus... Sorta"
2004	The Drew Carey Show	Carmelita	"Girlfriend, Interrupted"
2004	Without a Trace	Louisa Cruz	"In the Dark"
2005	Quintuplets	Wendy	"The Coconut Kapow"
2017	My Crazy Sex		"Planes, Strains and Automobiles"
2018	Jane the Virgin	Allison	"Chapter 77"
2020	How to Get Away with Murder	Actress	"We're Not Getting Away with It"

=== Video games ===
Year	Title	Role
2008	Dead Space	Nicole Brennan
2009	Dead Space: Extraction	Nicole Brennan
2011	L.A. Noire	Clovis Galletta
