= Trio (Buffy the Vampire Slayer) =

The Trio
- Buffy the Vampire Slayer character
- First appearance: "Flooded" (assembled)
- Last appearance: "Villains" (disbanded) (2002)
- Created by: Joss Whedon
- Portrayed by: Adam Busch; Danny Strong; Tom Lenk

In-universe information
- Classification: Human
- Notable powers: See members

The Trio are a group of three fictional characters in the sixth season of Buffy the Vampire Slayer, who serve as the villains of the season. They continually strive to neutralize Buffy, the Slayer, and thus the primary obstacle to their ultimate goal of taking over Sunnydale. Though initially comic relief and little more than a nuisance to the Scooby Gang, they take a darker turn by the episode "Dead Things". Most of their schemes combine science and mysticism, and they are able to avoid detection by the Scoobies (who merely assume their activities to be the doings of demons) until halfway through the season.

The Trio was formed by Warren Mears, technology expert; Andrew Wells, summoner of demons; and Jonathan Levinson, caster of spells. Jonathan was a longtime recurring character, having first appeared in season 2, and was a friendly acquaintance of the Scooby Gang. Warren had appeared twice in season 5. While Andrew had never been seen on the show before, his brother was in the episode "The Prom".

The three of them begin season 6 as good friends. Tired of being pushed around, they resolve to combine their expertise and "take over Sunnydale" as equal partners. As the stakes rise, the power shifts and Warren gradually dominates the group. Though Jonathan and Andrew lack the malice and hatred of true villains, Warren eventually reveals his true colors as a violent misogynist capable of murder. The Trio is continually thwarted by Buffy, and none of their actions make any name for themselves in Sunnydale's mystical underground, as revealed in "Villains". The group is ultimately disbanded when, after a face-off with Buffy, Warren flees and leaves Andrew and Jonathan to take the fall with the police.

== Members ==
Warren Mears first appeared in season 5 when he made two gynoid robots (one for himself and one for Spike). He makes all of the mad science devices used by the Trio. He has the strongest will of the three and quickly assumes the leadership position. After accidentally killing his ex-girlfriend in a fit of rage, he leads The Trio down a dark path. Warren is established early on as the one most willing to take real risks and do real harm to the Sunnydale citizens. He is finally killed by Willow, when she became Dark Willow, after Warren accidentally killed Tara.

Jonathan Levinson is a sorcerer of considerable skill and ingenuity but only moderate power. Most reluctant member of the group, he consistently prefers the least violent solutions to their problems, especially having a soft spot for Buffy, who had saved his life on several occasions. Warren and Andrew eventually conspire against Jonathan and attempt to leave him to take the entire blame of their last heist, but Andrew fails to get away in time. He is finally killed by Andrew manipulated by The First Evil.

Andrew Wells is an expert summoner of demons. Andrew has the weakest will of the group and easily allows Warren, whom he worships, to manipulate him against Jonathan, though Warren ultimately sacrifices Andrew for his own escape. Numerous hints imply that Andrew is gay and that he is deeply infatuated with Warren, but he is generally too immature and insecure to even realize the situation.

== Group biography ==
The Trio first appear in "Flooded", where they hire a demon to rob a bank and attack Buffy. In "Life Serial" they compete with each other to disorient Buffy by magical and technological means. In "Smashed" they steal a large diamond from a museum, immobilizing the sole guard with a "freeze ray". Also in "Smashed", Spike (who met Warren in "I Was Made to Love You") turns to the Trio to learn what has gone wrong with his inhibitor chip, forcing them to comply by threatening to break their rare Boba Fett action figure.

In "Gone", Warren incorporates the diamond into his invisibility ray. Jonathan and Andrew, quarreling over who will get to use the ray first, accidentally cause it to overload and turn Buffy invisible. They arrange to meet Buffy and restore her, but Warren secretly sets the device to kill her instead. A scuffle allows Willow to grab the ray, change the setting, and restore Buffy and the Trio to visibility, revealing their identities to the gang.

Warren increasingly treats the others as his lackeys, reserving to himself the use of whatever devices they make or steal. In "Dead Things" Warren hypnotizes his former girlfriend Katrina to be his sex slave, and kills her when she shakes off his control. Though Andrew and Jonathan are horrified by Katrina's murder, Warren coerces them into helping him frame Buffy for the crime. The Trio then use time-distorting demons to convince Buffy that she killed Katrina. Though the plan nearly succeeds, Buffy immediately realizes the truth when she hears the police identify Katrina's body.

In "Normal Again", Andrew summons a demon which injects Buffy with a psychoactive poison, almost convincing her that her life as a Slayer is imaginary and she can cure herself by killing her friends. It is subsequently discovered in "Entropy" that the Trio has planted numerous spy cameras and bugs in the Bronze, the Magic Box, and the Summers household, through which both the Trio and the Scoobies witness Spike and Anya having drunken sex, leading to the revelation of Buffy's secret affair with Spike.

In "Seeing Red", Warren invades the lair of the Nezzla demons to steal the Orbs of Nezzla'Khan, mystical artifacts that grant the bearer superhuman strength and physical invulnerability, with which they plan to commit a massive amount of bank robberies, starting with an armored car at an amusement park. When Buffy arrives to thwart them, the mystically-enhanced Warren easily outmatches her until Jonathan, fed up with Warren's lack of conscience and domineering attitude, surreptitiously tells Buffy how to defeat Warren. Just as Warren, ecstatic that he has defeated the Slayer when numerous demons and vampires have failed, has Buffy at his mercy, Buffy steals the belt pouch containing the orbs and destroys them before kicking Warren across the parking lot. As a furious Buffy advances, an outraged and humiliated Warren vows to take Buffy down before escaping with a jet pack, leaving Andrew and Jonathan to take the fall with the police, leaving the Trio officially disbanded.

The next morning, while Jonathan and Andrew languish in Sunnydale jail, Warren returns to Buffy's house with a gun and shoots Buffy in revenge. Though Buffy is only injured, Warren also unintentionally kills Tara, sending her girlfriend Willow into a magical rage. After saving Buffy, Willow hunts down her girlfriend's killer, easily dismissing most of his technological diversions and deceptions ("Villains"). Insane with rage and grief, Willow tortures Warren before flaying and incinerating him with her magic.

With Warren dead, Willow then heads after the remaining members of the Trio ("Two to Go"). Buffy and friends rescue Andrew and Jonathan before Willow can reach them, but Willow comes after them again. Eventually Andrew and Jonathan agree to run away to Mexico together, leaving Buffy to handle Willow.

The pair are seen again in "Conversations with Dead People," in which they return to Sunnydale on a quest to find an artefact hidden within Sunnydale High School. While they split up to search for it, the First Evil appears to Andrew in Warren's form to help in the search. As Andrew and Jonathan find the Seal of Danzalthar, Andrew stabs Jonathan to death on "Warren"'s urging, using Jonathan's blood to activate the Seal, leaving Andrew the only one of the original Trio still alive.

Andrew later runs into Willow purely by accident ("Never Leave Me"), and she drags him back to Buffy where, terrified of Willow and desperate for a new "gang" to belong to, he admits what he did. From this point on, Andrew grows closer to the Scoobies, helping to take care of the house for the Potential Slayers, even while the First Evil continues to use the images of Warren and Jonathan to taunt him. It is not until Buffy forces him to face the fact that he was not simply tricked into killing Jonathan by the First, but also carries responsibility for his friend's murder, that he is able to begin working towards redemption for his actions ("Storyteller").

Andrew goes into battle against the First Evil and its army of Turok-Han, not expecting to survive ("Chosen"). Instead he is denied a redemptive death when Anya saves his life at the cost of her own.

Andrew later appears in two episodes of the Buffy spin-off series Angel. In "Damage", a criminally insane Slayer is discovered in Los Angeles, and Buffy and Giles send their "best man" to handle it, which turns out to be Andrew. While Andrew has grown up considerably in the meantime, he is still largely ineffectual until he finally asserts himself by bringing out an army of Slayers to face down Angel's team and take the damaged Slayer away. Angel and Spike both remain quite amazed that Andrew outwitted them.

In "The Girl in Question", Spike and Angel rush to Rome in an attempt to save Buffy, who they think is in mortal danger. Instead they find Andrew functioning as chaperone to some more local Slayers, and Andrew again confounds them by explaining that Buffy can handle herself and they are the ones who now have to grow up.

Andrew appears as a member of the Scooby Gang in the "Season 8" comic books, where he continues to assist with training the Slayers. Warren also appears to have survived (casting confusion on the First Evil's use of his form in season 7), and is working with Amy Madison, who uses magic to keep Warren functioning despite his having been flayed.
