= Bring On the Night (Buffy the Vampire Slayer) =

- Buffy the Vampire Slayer episode
- Episode no.: Season 7 Episode 10
- Directed by: David Grossman
- Written by: Marti Noxon; Doug Petrie
- Production code: 7ABB10
- Original air date: December 17, 2002

Guest appearances
- Anthony Stewart Head as Rupert Giles; Kristine Sutherland as Joyce Summers; Tom Lenk as Andrew Wells; Iyari Limon as Kennedy; Clara Bryant as Molly; Courtnee Draper as Annabelle; Juliet Landau as The First/Drusilla; D.B. Woodside as Principal Robin Wood; Camden Toy as Ubervamp; Chris Wiley as Roger

Episode chronology
| ← Previous "Never Leave Me" | Next → "Showtime" |
- Buffy the Vampire Slayer season 7

"Bring on the Night" is the tenth episode of the seventh and final season of the television series Buffy the Vampire Slayer. The episode aired on December 17, 2002 on UPN.

Potential Slayers begin to arrive at Buffy's home, Spike is held prisoner by the First Evil, and Buffy finds the high school principal acting in a suspicious and spooky way.

== Plot ==
Whilst the gang research the First Evil, Buffy experiences a vision in which her mother gives her a book and warns her that she needs to rest; then Xander wakes her. The Ubervamp drags Spike into a cave where the First has taken on Drusilla's form to watch Spike get tortured. Throughout the episode, the Ubervamp tortures Spike by dunking his head under water and beating him while "Drusilla" threatens him. Spike angers the First by saying that Buffy believes in him.

At the Summers house, Buffy, Dawn and Anya force Andrew to go to the school basement where the mystical Seal of Danzalthar is, but although they do not know what the Seal does, they cover it with dirt again. On the way out, Buffy and Dawn run into Principal Wood, also carrying a shovel. (Only the viewers realize that he has been burying Andrew's murdered friend Jonathan, whom Wood did not know.) Wood asks Buffy to return to work soon.

At the house, Willow begins a spell to find the First, but it backfires and she is briefly possessed by it. Xander helps and Willow begs Buffy not to let her hurt anyone with magic. To their surprise and delight, Giles appears at the front door. With him are three young women – Kennedy, Molly and Annabelle – who are Potential Slayers.

Giles explains about the First's plans to destroy all Slayers-in-training, their Watchers and eventually the two active Slayers, Buffy and Faith. The Watchers' Council has been destroyed along with most of their records, except for the few books and references on the First he stole while there was still time. The First can only take on the appearance of the dead, but it is incapable of solid form. He informs Buffy that unfortunately, she is the only one strong enough to actually stand a chance of winning against the First and is solely responsible for the Potentials' lives. Kennedy, a lesbian, helps Willow make the sleeping arrangements around the house and decides to stay in Willow's room.

Buffy and Giles search for the cave Buffy remembers from the first time she encountered the First and its minions, the Bringers. Buffy is viciously attacked by the Ubervamp. She stakes but does not kill him and he beats her badly. Buffy narrowly manages to escape and the vampire is kept at bay by the rising sun. Giles and Buffy return to the house to report on the vampire Buffy fought, a Turok-Han. Giles explains that it is one of a prehistoric race of vampires that is far stronger than the everyday vampires Buffy is used to.

At work, Buffy researches "evil" on the internet (receiving 900,517 hits) as Wood stops to check on her. She experiences another vision of the First as her mother. While Buffy watches for the sun to set, Annabelle runs off into the streets of Sunnydale until she is captured by the Ubervamp and quickly killed. Buffy finds them both and is badly injured in a fight with the monster.

Buffy sits alone at home as she listens to Giles and Willow talk in another room, worrying about her wounded condition and their ability to fight what seems undefeatable. Buffy delivers an inspirational speech about the huge challenge before them. She tells the group that she has a new plan: they are declaring war on the evil instead of waiting for it to make a move.

== Production ==
According to The Watcher's Guide, Volume 3, by Paul Ruditis (Pocket Books, 2004), a stage direction in the script was "NOTE: It is VERY important that Giles does not touch or be touched by anything. He can walk and talk - but he can't fiddle or cuddle or caress. Got it?" Anthony Stewart Head (Giles) was told not to touch anything on set - such as, in a running joke, his eyeglasses - to perpetuate the idea that he might be the First. Head told an interviewer,

I was constantly asking, 'Can I do this or not?' What was patently clear was that I couldn't touch any props, to everyone's great joy, because I have a tendency to use props a lot. Part of the way I work is to try to bring some of the outside world in to the scene, rather than just play the scene off the page. You have a life and the scene happens to be part of that, and so, quite often, I'd involve something, so everyone thought it was very funny that I was stuck not being able to use props. It proved a challenge because I had to make sense of it - why would Giles come in and not touch anybody, not hug anybody, not involve himself like the usual thing? ... I internalised it all and was in my own little world of seriousness, trying to deal with everything, and had shut down and wasn't allowing myself to be friendly.

== Cultural references ==
Xander suggests trapping the Ubervamp in the pantry, then, "Are you saying M. Night Shyamalan lied to us?" He refers to the 2002 movie Signs, in which an alien is locked in a pantry.

Andrew says:

- "My spider-sense is tingling."
- "You think I'm a super-villain like Dr. Doom or Apocalypse or The Riddler."
- "An evil name should be something like Lex or Voldemort" (as opposed to "The First").
- "I'm like Darth Vader in the last five minutes of Jedi with redemptive powers minus a redemptive struggle of epic redemption."

When Wood catches Buffy searching for "evil" on the internet, she says, "I just love those evil, evil movies. Like Exorcist, you know, Blair Witch."

In the school basement, Andrew complains, "Man, this place gives me the creeps. It's like in Wonder Woman, issue 297/299—" and Xander agrees, "Catacombs—yeah, with the skeletons."

== Continuity ==
In the episode "Life Serial," Buffy was temporarily trapped in a time loop by the Trio of Andrew, Warren Mears and Jonathan Levinson. She was confounded by having to deal with an undead Mummy's hand, which she had to fight over and over again, at the Magic Box shop. In the following episode, "All the Way," Buffy says, "Don't blame me if we keep having this conversation over and over..." In "Bring on the Night," Xander tells the Scoobies, "It's a loop, like the Mummy hand. I'm doomed to replace these windows for all eternity."

== Reception ==
Vox, ranking it at #130 of all 144 episodes on their "Worst to Best" list, writes, "You know how when you think of any given episode of season seven, you can be pretty sure Buffy made an inspiring speech and Spike sat sadly in the basement and the Potentials were irritating, but you're not really sure if anything else happened from week to week? Here's where that starts. (The first third of season seven is actually pretty solid, which is easy to forget given what a slog the middle section is.) Not coincidentally, the interminable sameness begins with the introduction of the Potentials, who are an interesting thematic addition to the show in theory, but in practice take up a whole lot of dramatic space without adding much."

Paste Magazine, in a similar list, ranked it at #89, saying it "is most notable for Giles' return with the first three Potentials and Buffy's attempt at a Henry V-style St. Crispins Day speech. It's not quite as rousing and it's significantly shorter, but it's exactly what the Scoobies needed. This episode also serves as perhaps Buffy's worst beating of the series. It's brutal and so very hard to watch, but combined with her speech, it can't help but rally the troops." In 2023, Rolling Stone, ranked this episode as #119 on its own list, in honor of the 20th anniversary of the show's ending.

== Notes ==
1.Viewers of the show often ask why Spike is tortured by having his head held under water, when vampires don't need oxygen (although they do breathe) and cannot be forced to inhale. Some have answered that the torture is psychological, or that the sensation of drowning would be miserable for any creature.
2.Giles says, "As Neanderthals are to human beings, the Turok-Han are to vampires. Primordial, ferociously powerful killing machines, as single-minded as animals. They are the vampires that vampires fear. An ancient and entirely different race and, until this morning, I thought they were a myth." A BBC trivia page for the episode notes, "But the Neanderthals are usually held to have been wiped out by the ancestors of modern humanity, the Cro-Magnons. So Giles' analogy is seriously flawed."
