= Flooded (Buffy the Vampire Slayer) =

- Buffy the Vampire Slayer episode
- Episode no.: Season 6 Episode 4
- Directed by: Doug Petrie
- Written by: Jane Espenson; Doug Petrie
- Production code: 6ABB04
- Original air date: October 16, 2001

Guest appearances
- Anthony Stewart Head as Rupert Giles; Danny Strong as Jonathan Levinson; Adam Busch as Warren Mears; Tom Lenk as Andrew Wells; Todd Stashwick as M'Fashnik Demon; Amber Benson as Tara Maclay; Michael Merton as Mr. Savitsky; John Jabaley as Tito; Brian Kolb as Bank Guard

Episode chronology
← Previous "After Life"	Next → "Life Serial"
- Buffy the Vampire Slayer season 6

"Flooded" is the fourth episode of season 6 of the television series Buffy the Vampire Slayer.

== Plot ==
Buffy attempts to repair a leaky pipe in her basement only to have it burst and flood the basement. At breakfast, the gang discusses the damage while Xander and a plumber examine the damage caused by the pipes. The plumber advises Buffy that a full re-piping is necessary and hands her a very large bill. The size of the cost leads to Buffy finding that, with hospital bills and funeral costs, the Summers girls are broke. Needing a way to pay for the expenses, Buffy goes to a bank to consult with a loan director. Buffy finds that, without a job and with no real collateral, she cannot get a loan. A demon breaks through the office window, interrupting the meeting, and Buffy fights him despite her conservative clothing. The demon escapes and the director refuses to give Buffy the loan for saving his life.

Later that night, Willow tries to upset Buffy purposely in order to get her to express some real anger, but Buffy does not fall for it. Dawn wants to help with research, but Tara thinks she is too young and that fact is proven when Dawn looks at a picture in one of the books. Buffy is not pleased that Dawn is researching with the gang, but Dawn is able to identify the bank-robbing demon that Buffy encountered earlier. Giles returns to have a happy reunion and intense discussion with Buffy before meeting up with the rest of the gang.

The bank robbing demon, an M'Fashnik, throws a fit in front of his "controllers", Jonathan, Warren, and Andrew (brother of Tucker from "The Prom") complaining that the Slayer still lives even though they got the money from the bank. After a brief internal argument, Jonathan, Warren, and Andrew think up a way to accommodate the demon without killing Buffy. Giles takes the couch at the Summers home and talks with Buffy, offering to help her take care of the financial problems in the morning. The three guys discuss their mission - taking over Sunnydale - and somewhat agree unanimously that none of them wants to kill Buffy, but Warren secretly provides Buffy's address to the M'Fashnik demon so he can kill her.

Later that night, Giles asks Willow for specifics regarding the spell she cast to bring Buffy back to life. Willow, seeking Giles' praise, begins to boast about how scary the spell was, but Giles harshly reminds her why such spells are not practiced, including the possible consequences. He notes that he left her in charge of the group because he thought she was the most responsible, which he now sees is clearly not the case, ultimately calling her a "rank, arrogant amateur". Failing to see that Giles' anger is at least partially motivated by his deep affection for her, Willow stands up for herself, even threatening Giles, however he reminds her that the gang still has no idea where Buffy has been or what she has been through. Spike finds Buffy – who overheard Giles and Willow's conversation – on the back porch and the two exchange small talk about life and money. Giles and Dawn both have trouble sleeping and go for a snack. The M'Fashnik crashes their late night cereal party, but Buffy catches him. A fight ensues with Buffy and Spike working together against the M'Fashnik.

The fight ends up in the basement where the demon latches on to one of the pipes and Buffy immediately attacks as the expensive pipes are threatened. The "supervillain" guys plot to hypnotize Buffy and make her their willing love slave. The Scooby Gang regroups after the demon is taken care of and hopelessly attempts to save the furniture that was destroyed in battle. A phone call off-camera reveals that Angel (currently in Los Angeles) needs to meet with Buffy and she needs the same so she leaves to meet him at an intermediate location.

== Reception ==
In 2023, Rolling Stone, raked this episode as #115 out of the 144 episodes in honor of 20th anniversary of the show ending.
