= Life Serial =

- Buffy the Vampire Slayer episode
- Episode no.: Season 6 Episode 5
- Directed by: Nick Marck
- Written by: David Fury; Jane Espenson
- Production code: 6ABB05
- Original air date: October 23, 2001

Guest appearances
- Anthony Stewart Head as Rupert Giles; Danny Strong as Jonathan Levinson; Adam Busch as Warren Mears; Tom Lenk as Andrew Wells; Amber Benson as Tara Maclay; Paul Gutrecht as Tony; Noel Albert Guglielmi as Vince; Enrique Almeida as Marco; Jonathan Goldstein as Mike; Winsome Brown as Woman Customer; Christopher May as Male Customer; David J. Miller as Rat-Faced Demon; Andrew Cooper Wasser as Slime-Cover Demon; Richard Beatty as Small Demon; James C. Leary as Clem; Jennifer Shon as Rachel; Jabari Hearn as Steve; Derrick McMillon as Ron; Clint Culp as Bartender; Mark Ginther as Horned Demon; Alice Dinnean Vernon as Mummy Hand

Episode chronology
← Previous "Flooded"	Next → "All the Way"
- Buffy the Vampire Slayer season 6

"Life Serial" is the fifth episode in the 6th season of the television series Buffy the Vampire Slayer. The episode aired on October 23, 2001 on UPN. The episode was praised for its innovation and surreal humour.

== Plot ==
Buffy returns from her offscreen visit with Angel but refuses to talk about it. The Scoobies discuss Buffy's future. Buffy agrees to audit the classes Willow and Tara are taking until the next semester starts. Meanwhile, the Trio (an alliance of Warren, Andrew, and Jonathan) prepare for their competition to test Buffy, setting up their van with high-tech monitoring equipment.

At school, Buffy finds herself overwhelmed by a class she takes with Willow, being baffled by the postmodern jargon. Buffy later meets up with Tara for Art History, but before class begins Warren tags her with a tiny device that causes time to fast-forward. Buffy is dazed as the world whizzes around her; when she finally notices the device Warren planted on her, it self-destructs and puts Buffy back in normal time.

Buffy works with Xander at his construction job, telling him about the time situation at school before she is introduced to Tony, the boss. Andrew summons demons from the van, which trash the construction site before Buffy kills them. Unfortunately, Buffy knocks Tony unconscious and the construction men she saves refuse to admit they were saved by a girl. Xander gets mad at Buffy for bringing slaying to his workplace, though he realizes that something unusual is happening. However, he is still forced to fire her.

Buffy learns about working at The Magic Box from Giles and Anya as Jonathan begins a spell to loop time until Buffy satisfies a customer. Buffy assists a man with a candle sale and then goes downstairs to fetch a live Mummy's hand for a customer, but the hand attacks her and she is forced to kill it, which also kills the sale. Events start to repeat as Buffy must help the customers and fight the mummy hand over and over again, being reduced to tears out of frustration. She is stuck in an unsolved dilemma, but soon Buffy is able to end the spell by telling the woman she will order the hand instead of going downstairs to fight with the one they already have. Stressed out by the repeating time and the job itself, Buffy walks out. All the while, the three villains keep scores on their Buffy attacks.

Later that night, Buffy gets drunk with Spike at a bar where he plays poker (in a visual pun, they use kittens as currency for the kitty) and searches for information. After the poker game ends badly, Buffy rants to Spike about the new low her life has reached with her inability to understand school or get a decent job. Buffy and Spike notice a black van; the Trio notices Buffy approaching with alarm.

Jonathan, disguised as a demon, appears from behind the van and threatens Buffy, but she beats him down while the van drives away. With the use of smoke to confuse the slayer and vampire, Jonathan runs away and complains to Warren and Andrew, who realize they now have much information on Buffy's fighting style that can be used against her. Buffy begins to recover from her drunken state and complains to Giles about her life. He consoles her and offers her a cheque to help pay for all the expenses. Buffy says she is happy that Giles will always be there, but the look on Giles's face suggests that he might not always be.

== Production ==
The wriggling and murderous Mummy hand was portrayed by the hand of Alice Dinnean Vernon, who had worked on Sesame Street and The Muppet Show. Vernon was also one of the puppeteers in the Buffy spin-off Angel episode "Smile Time."

== Themes ==
Reviewer Ingrid Grace Russmann contends that it is one of the show's "most meta episodes, a commentary on the series as a whole":

Time loops are not exactly a convention of the vampire subgenre, but "Life Serial" used the device so effectively that it became a viable construct for future magic-based shows to emulate. The sixth season of Buffy is probably the series' darkest, between Buffy's post-death identity crisis and Willow's magic addiction—not to mention the multiple embodiments of toxicity that antagonize Buffy from all sides. When Spike is not attempting to seduce Buffy into embracing the possibility that she is no longer human, the Trio is waging a campaign to make her life a living hell (dimension), for their own amusement. It is hard to say which of these storylines is more sinister: Spike's actions bear all of the classic characteristics of an abusive boyfriend, but the Trio's war on the Slayer is as relentlessly cruel as online harassment. ... Buffy begins the episode with optimism; at her construction site, she delivers a monologue that effervesces positivity, breaking the viewer's heart with its irony. She ends the episode very near despair, held back from the brink only by the tenuous grasp of her Watcher.

== Cultural references ==
The website Women at Warp compares the time-loop situation with the Star Trek: The Next Generation episode "Cause and Effect." "One of TNG's most iconic episodes, "Cause and Effect" sees the Enterprise repeatedly exploding, as the crew tries to learn how to stop it. In Sunnydale, a trio of nerds test Buffy by setting a series of puzzles for her to solve, including a time loop where Buffy attempts to sell a mummy hand to a Magic Box patron over and over again. The Buffyverse drops a self-aware reference though, as Andrew says, "I just hope she solves it faster than Data did on the episode of TNG where the Enterprise kept blowing up." Bonus points: later on, Buffy accompanies Spike to a poker game, a subtle nod to the Enterprise crew's favorite game."

== Continuity ==
In the next episode, "All the Way," Buffy refers to the Mummy's hand again: "Don't blame me if we keep having this conversation over and over..." In "Bring on the Night," Xander tells the Scoobies, "It's a loop, like the Mummy hand. I'm doomed to replace these windows for all eternity."

== Reception ==
Vox ranked it as #84 in their list of "Worst to Best" episodes, with the view that it "is maybe more clever than genuinely good, but boy, is it clever! Buffy has her abilities tested both by a drooping bank account and three feisty nerds who want to see just what she's capable of, mostly because they can. A rare funny episode in a dour season."

In 2023, Rolling Stone ranked this episode as #100 out of the 144 episodes in honor of 20th anniversary of the show's ending, calling it "one of the lighter episodes... A very Bond-villain inspired move which fits their characters, and most of the episode plays for some good laughs."

In their recap, TV Tropes notes that some of the episode's humor derives from visual puns; for example, that "in card games the betting pool is often referred to as the kitty" and that the genre-savvy Trio naturally have a Big Red Button for their Destruct Mechanism. Meanwhile, some of the creepy effects include the Trio's sousveillance of Buffy by way of hidden cameras in their black van, as well as an "Unnaturally Looping Location": "In an effort to escape the time loop, Buffy tries to walk out the Magic Shop's front door only to find herself entering the shop from the back, much to Giles and Anya's puzzlement."

Reviewer Mark Oshiro writes of the characterization, "This episode is funny, but I think the writers don't ignore how disturbing some of this is or how taxing the tests the Trio give Buffy are for her. ... The true brilliance of their characterization is the sheer accuracy of the portrayal of bored, white middle class nerds. It's perfect. Each one of the three is geeky about a particular thing, and yet they still manage to find a million things to bicker over in that condescending, know-it-all tone... [O]f course they wouldn't namedrop Groundhog Day during Jonathan's task. It's not obscure enough; instead, they make reference to a Star Trek episode and one of my favorite episodes of The X-Files. ... The Trio are so engaged with banal minutia and this endless list of facts about fictional worlds that they don't ever truly think about what they're doing. To them, Buffy Summers is merely an object, an obstacle they study and gather data on by tormenting her for an entire day. ... It's this combination of misogyny and carelessness that makes the Trio frightening."
