= Conversations with Dead People =

- Buffy the Vampire Slayer episode
- Episode no.: Season 7 Episode 7
- Directed by: Nick Marck
- Written by: Jane Espenson; Drew Goddard
- Production code: 7ABB07
- Original air date: November 12, 2002

Guest appearances
- Danny Strong as Jonathan Levinson; Tom Lenk as Andrew Wells; Adam Busch as The First/Warren Mears; Jonathan M. Woodward as Holden Webster; Azura Skye as The First/Cassie Newton; Kristine Sutherland as The First/Joyce Summers; Stacey Scowley as Young Woman

Episode chronology
← Previous "Him"	Next → "Sleeper"
- Buffy the Vampire Slayer season 7

"Conversations with Dead People" is the seventh episode of the seventh and final season of the television series Buffy the Vampire Slayer. The episode aired on November 12, 2002 on UPN. It is the only episode other than "Once More, with Feeling" where the title appears on screen.

== Plot ==
Several encounters take place around Sunnydale on one night, which are told in real time. Uniquely among Buffy episodes, the main characters do not interact with one another. According to the staff writers, this was intended to enforce the idea of "being alone."

On patrol in the Sunnydale cemetery, Buffy encounters a newly-risen vampire. After a brief struggle, he abruptly stops, having recognized her as an old high school classmate. Buffy is surprised to discover that the vampire is Holden "Webs" Webster, a classmate that she barely remembers until he casually begins reminiscing. Webs, a psychology major in life, proceeds to psychoanalyze Buffy, and she opens up to him about her innermost conflicts and feelings of isolation. Webs offers several insights, including that Buffy's problems with commitment and frequent targeting of unavailable men stems from her damaged relationship with her father, and that her emotional distance to her friends results from the isolation she feels as the Slayer. While the two sporadically interrupt their discussion with fighting, Buffy ultimately concludes that her only regret in opening up to Webs is that she will have to kill him in their battle. She slays him in the end, but not before he identifies Spike as the vampire who recently sired him, leaving her standing in shock.

Meanwhile, Dawn prepares for a night alone at home. An unnaturally loud banging sets her nerves on edge, the electronics begin to malfunction and the house suffers from heavy wind and earthquakes. Eventually, Dawn comes to believe that her mother is trying to contact her, and the malevolent force is working to prevent her. Dawn manages to exorcise the malevolent force and a vision of Joyce appears to warn her that she cannot trust Buffy.

In a story entirely devoid of dialogue, Spike picks up a woman at a bar, walks her home, and feeds on her, leaving her dead on her own doorstep.

Jonathan and Andrew return from Mexico after several months in hiding. Both are plagued by nightmares and hope to share discoveries about an artifact hidden near the Hellmouth to win favor with Buffy. However, Andrew is secretly in contact with what appears to be the ghost of Warren, while Jonathan is having a personal revelation that he misses high school and still cares for his old friends. After they dig up the artifact, Andrew, on Warren's instructions, insults and kills Jonathan, causing his blood to spill all over a mystical portal, the Seal of Danzalthar, in the school basement.

In the library, Willow is visited by the ghost of Cassie, a girl Buffy once helped, who claims to have been sent by the dead Tara. The ghost relays Tara's message that Willow will end up killing everyone if she ever uses magic again, and recommends suicide as a solution. This tips Willow off that she has not been talking to Cassie, and she demands to know who the being really is. The being reveals itself as the First Evil and threatens Willow and all her friends before vanishing.

== Production ==
The writing of this episode is credited to Jane Espenson and Drew Goddard. However, according to the commentary by Espenson and Goddard on the DVD, this episode actually had four distinct writers: Espenson wrote the Dawn scenes, Goddard wrote the Geek Trio scenes, Joss Whedon wrote the Buffy-Holden scenes, and Marti Noxon wrote the Willow-Cassie scenes. Since Whedon and Noxon were the executive producers of the show, they would often forgo formal credit for their contributions to various scripts. Whedon wanted Amber Benson to appear as Tara, taunting Willow instead of Cassie, but Benson chose not to appear, partly because she did not want Tara to appear as an evil character after her death.

Other storylines considered were for Eric Balfour, who played Jesse McNally in the pilot episode, "Welcome to the Hellmouth", to have conversed with Xander; and, according to Drew Goddard on the "Selfless" DVD commentary, for Kali Rocha (Halfrek) to return and haunt Anya, but she was unavailable. As a result of the omitted storylines, this is the only episode of the series in which Xander does not appear. On the DVD commentary for the show, Jane Espenson revealed that the image of Joyce is the First. In the original draft of the script, Dawn was going to try to raise her mother. When Joyce appeared, she was to say, "They said I couldn't bring someone back." To which The First/Joyce would reply: "Maybe I'm the First."

== Reception ==
This episode was awarded the 2003 Hugo Award for Best Dramatic Presentation, Short Form. The Futon Critic named it the 42nd best episode of 2002, saying it was "Heartbreaking and deliciously evil at the same time—that's Buffy at its best for sure."
