= Two to Go =

- Buffy the Vampire Slayer episode
- Episode no.: Season 6 Episode 21
- Directed by: Bill L. Norton
- Written by: Doug Petrie
- Production code: 6ABB21
- Original air date: May 21, 2002

Guest appearances
- Danny Strong as Jonathan Levinson; Tom Lenk as Andrew Wells; Jeff Kober as Rack; Anthony Stewart Head as Rupert Giles; James C. Leary as Clem; Steven W. Bailey as Cave Demon; Jeff McCredie as Officer; Damian Mooney as Patrol Cop; Michael Younger as Truck Driver

Episode chronology
← Previous "Villains"	Next → "Grave"
- Buffy the Vampire Slayer season 6

"Two to Go" is the 21st episode of season 6 of the television show Buffy the Vampire Slayer. The episode aired on May 21, 2002 on UPN. The name of the episode is a reference to the previous one, which ends with Willow saying "One down" after killing Warren. Despite having died, Tara Maclay remains in brief scenes that are part of the opening credits.

This episode, and its second part, "Grave", were shown, back-to-back, as a two-hour feature on its original airing in both the United States and United Kingdom – consequently, the presentation of this episode on DVD includes credits such as "Grave" Written by...

Joss Whedon wanted to keep Anthony Stewart Head's appearance in this episode a surprise, and thus left him off of the main cast list; Head is listed as a 'special guest' in the closing credits. Whedon also does this in Angel for Julie Benz in "To Shanshu in L.A.", Eliza Dushku in "Judgment", Juliet Landau in "The Trial" and Alyson Hannigan in "There's No Place Like Plrtz Glrb".

== Plot ==
While Spike continues to pass trials in his quest in Africa, Buffy, Xander, and Anya try to pursue Willow, who has killed Warren to avenge his murder of Tara and now plans to execute his two jailed accomplices. They discover that Willow has damaged Xander's car to prevent them from catching her. Buffy continues her pursuit on foot.

Anya teleports into Jonathan and Andrew's cell shortly before Willow arrives. Anya and Buffy manage to evade Willow's attack and slip away with the two men. As Xander drives them away in a stolen police cruiser, Willow attacks them with a truck she is wielding magically; but her overuse of magic has drained her power, and they escape.

Dawn and Clem decide to go to the dark magician Rack's lair, expecting Willow to try to deal with him to recharge her powers. Buffy, Xander and Anya regroup at the Magic Box and debate their course of action. Buffy believes she can convince Willow to relent, but the others disagree; Buffy heads for Rack's, alone. Xander admits to Anya that he might have been able to stop Warren before he fired on Buffy and Tara, but was afraid to intervene, unarmed.

Willow meets with Rack, who attempts to seduce her. She rejects his advances, drains his power and kills him, just as Dawn arrives. Dawn's effort to calm the much more powerful Willow prove futile and serve only to annoy her, but Buffy arrives before she acts against Dawn. Buffy tries to talk with Willow, who replies that nothing in the world matters anymore since Tara's death. Willow teleports the group back to the Magic Shop, where Buffy and Dawn collapse. As Willow attacks, Anya fires up a protection spell to shield Jonathan and Andrew. As Willow intensifies her attack, Buffy tries a physical attack, allowing all but Anya to escape.

Willow subdues Buffy, then disables Anya and negates her protection spells. As she declares her victory, she is struck down by a bolt of energy from an arriving Giles.

== Reception ==
In 2023, Rolling Stone, ranked this episode as #114 out of the 144 episodes in honor of the 20th anniversary of the show's ending.

Screen Rant named it an episode including some of "The Best 60 Seconds From All 7 Seasons." "A minute at the end of the episode depicts Willow's beating down of Buffy and her cockiness at how powerful she's become. She suggests there's nobody in the world with the power to stop her rampage just before a bolt of mystical energy smashes her to the ground. It's revealed to be Giles, absent for most of the season, returning with the power to subdue Willow. The minute ends with Giles challenging Willow's suggestion, saying, "I'd like to test that theory."
