= Never Leave Me =

- Buffy the Vampire Slayer episode
- Episode no.: Season 7 Episode 9
- Directed by: David Solomon
- Written by: Drew Goddard
- Production code: 7ABB09
- Original air date: November 26, 2002

Guest appearances
- Danny Strong as The First/Jonathan Levinson; Adam Busch as The First/Warren Mears; Tom Lenk as Andrew Wells; Cynthia Lamontagne as Lydia; Oliver Muirhead as Phillip; Kris Iyer as Nigel; Harris Yulin as Quentin Travers; D.B. Woodside as Principal Robin Wood; Donald Bishop as Butcher; Camden Toy as Übervamp; Bobby Brewer as Hoffman; Roberto Santos as Grimes

Episode chronology
← Previous "Sleeper"	Next → "Bring On the Night"
- Buffy the Vampire Slayer season 7

"Never Leave Me" is the ninth episode of the seventh and final season of the television series Buffy the Vampire Slayer, in which the Scooby Gang begins to realize the magnitude of their peril. The episode aired on November 26, 2002 on UPN.

== Plot ==
Xander works to repair the living room window while Dawn, Willow and Anya help clean up and discuss the potential danger that is Spike. Wearing a trench coat like Spike's, Andrew is coached by Warren to continue playing his part in the game. Warren explains that because he cannot take corporeal form, Andrew is now a crucial player. Buffy tries to offer comforting words to Spike while she ties him down to a chair. He instructs her to tie the rope tighter so he cannot get free.

Dawn drops by Principal Wood's office and informs him that Buffy is sick and unable to attend work. Buffy calls Quentin Travers and asks about Giles, but he is just as clueless as she is. He is with a group of Watchers and informs them that they need to find Giles quickly. Buffy checks on Spike, who is struggling to control his blood lust after tasting so much human blood. He vamps and snaps at her, but remains tied to the chair. Buffy and Willow talk about Spike outside the room and Willow volunteers to get him some animal blood to help ease his cravings.

Warren coaches Andrew on killing a pig, but Andrew fails miserably and resorts to going to the butcher shop to get the blood they need. At the butcher shop, Andrew orders an array of meats and pig's blood, but as he is leaving, he runs into Willow and spills his purchases on the ground. Andrew runs from her, but she catches up with him and uses his assumption that she is evil to frighten him. She takes him back to the house with her, pointing out his suspicious behavior and purchase of animal blood to the rest of the group. Xander and Anya interrogate Andrew while he is tied to a chair, but he does not say anything. Anya snaps and slaps Andrew before Xander pulls her out of the room. Upstairs, Buffy feeds Spike some of the animal blood as Anya and Xander meet in the bathroom to discuss their tactics with Andrew. Spike is calmed and talks to Buffy about how little he remembers about his killing. She asks about how he got his soul and he tells her about the demon trials.

Xander returns to Andrew and changes tactic to politeness. He unties Andrew and offers him water while using Anya's ability to hurt men as a threat. Anya comes charging in and attacks Andrew, intending to beat his knowledge out of him. Buffy leaves Spike momentarily to investigate Andrew's cries for help, but leaves as soon as Anya and Xander assure her they have things under control. When she leaves, the morphing version of Spike appears and starts to talk to the real Spike. Buffy hears Spike singing through the door to her room and when she goes back inside, she finds him acting differently. He claims to be hungry and asks for blood, but as soon as he gets it he breaks free from his chair and knocks Buffy down, leaving her stunned. While Andrew leans against a wall and starts to talk to Anya about what he knows in the next room over, Spike punches through the wall, grabs Andrew from behind, and viciously bites him.

Buffy recovers and pulls Spike off Andrew; she knocks Spike out with a powerful kick. Buffy discusses Spike's strange behavior with the gang and Xander concludes that Spike is being manipulated by a posthypnotic trigger, in military style. Buffy instructs the gang to begin researching so they can figure out what they are dealing with. At the high school, Wood leaves his office, but detours through the basement where he finds Jonathan's dead body on top of the symbol. He then buries Jonathan in a deserted location.

Buffy goes down to the basement to clean up Spike's wounds while he lies chained up to a brick wall. He wakes up and does not understand why he has no memory of his actions. Buffy tells him of Xander's trigger theory. Spike orders Buffy to kill him because she and the Scoobies are not prepared to handle the "real" Spike. She denies his request and Spike responds with a theory of his own: that Buffy likes men who hurt her and that is why she has never been able to kill him. She tells him that his theory no longer describes her; and that she is not going to kill him because something is controlling him, and because he can be, and now is, a good man. She tells Spike she believes in him.

Suddenly, the windows and doors break all over the house as robed figures attack the Scooby Gang. The gang fights a vicious battle with the robed figures attacking them. Dawn defends herself from two of the robed figures while Buffy chases one upstairs and protects Andrew from being killed. Most of the robed figures are disabled or killed, but they did not come for Buffy and the gang; they came for Spike. Down in the basement, Buffy and Xander find that Spike's chains are empty and he is nowhere to be seen. Buffy recognizes the faces of the robed figures as harbingers representing the First Evil (first encountered four years ago) and realizes that is who they are dealing with. The ghosts haunting them, the games being played on them and the impending danger that will come from beneath are all connected to the First.

Watchers report to Quentin about the numerous attacks on the Council around the world. Quentin confirms that the First is responsible and orders the Watchers to prepare for their greatest challenge. Seconds later, the Watcher's Council headquarters explodes. In the Sunnydale High School basement, Spike is strapped to circular contraption and the robed figures cut designs into Spike's skin. The First chastises Spike in his form before morphing into Buffy's form and watches as the Bringers raise the contraption and Spike up to the ceiling and turn him face-first over the seal. Spike's blood falls onto the seal and opens it. As the First explains, an older kind of vampire called a Turok-Han emerges.

== Reception ==
In 2023, Rolling Stone, raked this episode as #109 out of the 144 episodes in honor of 20th anniversary of the show ending.
