= Smashed (Buffy the Vampire Slayer) =

- Buffy the Vampire Slayer episode
- Episode no.: Season 6 Episode 9
- Directed by: Turi Meyer
- Written by: Drew Z. Greenberg
- Production code: 6ABB09
- Original air date: November 20, 2001

Guest appearances
- Danny Strong as Jonathan Levinson; Adam Busch as Warren Mears; Tom Lenk as Andrew Wells; Elizabeth Anne Allen as Amy Madison; Amber Benson as Tara Maclay; Patrice Walters as Woman; John Patrick Clerkin as Man; Jack Jozefson as Rusty; Rick Garcia as Reporter; Kelly Smith as Innocent Girl; Jordan Belfi as Ryan; Adam Weiner as Simon; Melanie Sirmons as Brie; Lauren Nissi as Girlfriend

Episode chronology
← Previous "Tabula Rasa"	Next → "Wrecked"
- Buffy the Vampire Slayer season 6

"Smashed" is the 9th episode of season 6 of the television series Buffy the Vampire Slayer. The episode aired on November 20, 2001, on UPN.

== Plot ==
Whilst trying to help Buffy defend a couple from two muggers, Spike confronts Buffy on their previous two kisses; she refuses to discuss the matter and he gets frustrated, telling her she is still not admitting her feelings towards him.

In a comical scene resembling a famous sequence from the Mission: Impossible films, Warren, Jonathan and Andrew steal a large diamond from a museum, leaving its sole guard frozen by their freeze-ray. As Buffy rushes to the scene, Spike again asks her about the last kiss; she says she was on edge due to Giles' decision to leave and apologizes for leading him on. Spike remains unconvinced and tries to coax her until she punches him; he punches her back and discovers that the chip in his head gives him no pain when he hits her. After verifying, with Warren's help, that the chip appears undamaged and still causes him agony when he harms humans, Spike tells Buffy that she "came back wrong" and that she has a "little demon" in her. In furious disbelief, Buffy assaults Spike and they battle until Buffy unleashes her desire and kisses him, initiating such passionate sex that the abandoned house in which they were fighting collapses around them.

Willow, sad and lonely without Tara, figures out a way to turn the metamorphosed Amy from a rat back into human. Feeling newly liberated, they decide to go out and have some fun. At The Bronze, a couple of guys try to intimidate them. They perform a spell on the boys to make fun of them, but soon they begin to perform more and more complex spells, filling the Bronze with strangely dressed people, sheep, mutations and so on. Willow is beginning to have a taste of her real power and she likes it. Meanwhile, Tara meets with a depressed Dawn and assures her that she was not to blame for her moving out or her break-up with Willow. Tara admits that she still loves Willow but is uncertain of their future and still concerned about Willow's overuse of magic. She reluctantly agrees to have a sleepover with Dawn to keep her company.
