= Dead Things =

- Buffy the Vampire Slayer episode
- Episode no.: Season 6 Episode 13
- Directed by: James A. Contner
- Written by: Steven S. DeKnight
- Production code: 6ABB13
- Original air date: February 5, 2002

Guest appearances
- Danny Strong as Jonathan Levinson; Adam Busch as Warren Mears; Tom Lenk as Andrew Wells; Amelinda Embry as Katrina Silber; Amber Benson as Tara Maclay; Marion Calvert as Gina; Rock Reiser as Desk Sergeant; Bernard K Addison as Cop #1; Eric Prescott as Cop #2

Episode chronology
← Previous "Doublemeat Palace"	Next → "Older and Far Away"
- Buffy the Vampire Slayer season 6

"Dead Things" is the 13th episode of season 6 of the television series Buffy the Vampire Slayer. It originally appeared on February 5, 2002. The episode was directed by James A. Contner and written by Steven S. DeKnight.

== Plot ==
After having sex on the floor of Spike's crypt, Buffy and Spike discuss her feelings for him; she acknowledges "sometimes" liking him at best, but "never" fully trusting him. Later, Buffy talks privately with Tara about the fact that Spike can now hurt her despite his chip continuing to function; she fears Willow's spell brought her back "wrong", and Tara agrees to research the possibility. That evening, Xander and Anya teach Dawn to waltz, in preparation for the wedding. Dawn leaves to stay with her friend Janice, not having anticipated Buffy's uncharacteristic desire to spend the evening with her, so Buffy joins the others at the Bronze. There, Buffy and Willow discuss the latter's recovery after having not used magic in a month. Willow then joins Xander and Anya on the dance floor, while Buffy wanders to the balcony. Spike joins her there and they have sex while he forces her to watch her friends dance; he encourages her to think of her life with him as separate from theirs.

Meanwhile, the Trio create a "cerebral dampener", which can turn any woman into their sex slave. Warren browses a bar for attractive women while Andrew and Jonathan watch through a camera in Warren's tie, pointing out various women they would like to have as slaves. Irritated by the suggestions, Warren removes his earpiece and approaches someone familiar: his ex-girlfriend, Katrina. Katrina rejects Warren, but he uses the dampener on her and she addresses him as "Master". The trio bring her to the house they have rented since fleeing their lair, and dress her as a French maid. After she serves them champagne, Warren brings her to a bedroom for sex, but the dampener's control fades. Enraged, she accuses the Trio of planning to rape her, shocking Jonathan and Andrew, who are also disturbed to learn that she is Warren's ex-girlfriend. Katrina declares she will go to the police; to stop her from leaving, Warren hits her in the head with the champagne bottle, accidentally killing her.

That night, Buffy goes to Spike's crypt, but leaves before he comes to the door. On patrol, she follows a woman's screams and is attacked by demons. The timeline of the fight seemingly flows out of order. Spike attacks the demons, while a disoriented Buffy accidentally strikes the female victim, apparently causing her to fall to her death; the woman was actually Jonathan magically disguised as Katrina, whom Buffy did not recognize, and the Trio then planted Katrina's real corpse at the scene. Spike pulls a distraught Buffy away from the scene and tries to dispose of the body. After experiencing a disturbing dream about Spike and Katrina, Buffy tells Dawn that she has to go the police for her involvement in a woman's death; assuming Buffy will be taken away from her as a result, Dawn accuses Buffy of being emotionally absent and actively looking for a way to be separated from her.

Outside the police station, Spike tries to prevent Buffy from turning herself in, only for them to overhear that the body washed up by the river. Spike tells Buffy that, having saved thousands of lives, she should not have to pay for accidentally taking one. As Spike attempts to physically restrain her, Buffy takes out her frustration and anger on Spike; he stops defending himself and encourages her to attack him. She beats him senseless, calling him evil and soulless. Appalled by what she has just done, Buffy walks dazedly away from Spike. She enters the police station and overhears that the girl in the woods was Katrina Silber, whom she now recognizes as Warren's ex-girlfriend. Immediately guessing the truth, Buffy leaves without discussing the incident with the police. The Scooby Gang research and find that the Rwasundi Demons whom Buffy encountered in the woods caused the time-shifting, concluding that Katrina was dead before Buffy even encountered her. Buffy is certain of Warren's involvement and wants The Trio found and dealt with. The Sunnydale Police rule Katrina's death to be suicide or accidental drowning; Andrew, who was initially horrified and devastated by Katrina's death, is enthused by Warren's pronouncement that they got away with murder, while Jonathan seems disturbed.

After researching the resurrection spell, Tara tells Buffy that the spell changed Buffy on a molecular level, just enough to confuse Spike's chip, but did not make her in any way "wrong". Buffy is distraught, because she felt this was the only way to explain her recent behavior, and admits that she and Spike are having sex. Though surprised, Tara is supportive and says that it is okay if Buffy loves Spike, since Spike loves her. Buffy says that her not loving Spike, but only "using" him, disgusts her as much as actually loving him. Buffy breaks down crying with her head in Tara's lap, begging to know what is "wrong" with her.

== Themes and interpretations ==
Mark Oshiro, pining for the regular presence of Giles and Tara, argues that Season 6 explores how the "Scoobies just aren't the same anymore. ... What happens when these people have no support system? How will they cope if their self-formed family falls apart?"

Most commenters on the episode discuss sexual ethics, as well as the issues of immorality and amorality as depicted by the members of the Trio. For example, the Snark Squad essayists call Warren a "full-fledged sociopath," with Jonathan and Andrew "the junior misogynists," in an "episode that is extra rapey, even by S6's low standard for proper consent;" in their review, they refer to the Trio's new secret lair as "the Basement of Misogyny & Failure," their transportation as the "Pedo Van," and the cerebral dampener as "the rape ball." The boys know that superhero Buffy is "the real law in Sunnydale," and the police merely "the less fearsome of the two options." TV Tropes notes that the title has a multivalent meaning: Katrina winds up dead; Buffy feels dead inside; and Spike is undead; the site also discusses the memes "Sex for Solace," "I Have You Now, My Pretty," "Destructive Romance," "Evil Feels Good," and to a lesser extent "Applied Phlebotinum" for the dampener (a term coined by David Greenwalt).

Theresa Basile, in a series about consent issues in Buffy, looks back to Season 5's episode "I Was Made to Love You", in which Warren "was ditching the sex-bot he created and finding love with a real live woman because she was more interesting than a sex-bot. In this episode, he tries to turn the real live woman into the sex-bot and punishes her when she doesn't capitulate."

Basile regards Andrew and Jonathan as "less malicious" but "equally culpable," with both owning frustrations and immaturity that they need to overcome (two of the three will never have the chance to do so).

This episode is also a criticism of geek culture and its sense of entitlement and victimization. Warren, Jonathan, and Andrew all have built-up anger from being ignored and treated badly in childhood and in high school. They believe that they're entitled to sex from whatever woman they want. Sex with a hot woman of their choice is their reward for having been bullied and ostracized in their youth. They don't see that their objectification of women is denying women their humanity, much like others denied their humanity when they were younger. Jonathan and Andrew are upset when Katrina calls them rapists, not because they feel remorse for taking advantage of a woman, but because they don’t want to see themselves as rapists.

As regards Buffy and Spike's relationship, she sees it as in keeping with the Trio's practice of sexual misconduct in this episode, and of mutual abusive power and control throughout the series.

It's easy to say that Spike is taking advantage of a woman who is clinically depressed, that while the scene on the balcony is not technically rape, he's taking advantage of her insecurities and pushing her buttons. He doesn't care how unhappy she is, as long as she ends up with him. That's gross, and that's textbook abusive behavior. ... [Yet] even though Spike is completely selfish in many aspects of his relationship with Buffy, he's not wrong to want to stop her from going to the police. There, his instincts are correct, even if his actions are not. He knows that Buffy's not going to the cops because she's trying to do the responsible thing; she's doing an act of self-destruction. ... Then Buffy is beating Spike's face bloody, taking out her self-hatred on another person, and is also exhibiting textbook abusive behavior – not the behavior of a narcissistic, sadistic abuser, but an abuser who vents insecurities on another person.

== Reception ==
In 2023, Rolling Stone ranked this episode at #92 out of the 144 episodes, commenting that the "slapstick mask of The Trio drops here and the raging misogyny of Warren takes over, giving us the bleakest episode of Buffy. ... It's a powerful episode, but it's relentless in its despair." Vox ranked it at #60 with similar wording, but added, "thank god for Tara, the one consistent source of warmth" in the season.

Reviewer Billie Doux focuses chiefly on the central affair, writing, "This was the strongest Buffy/Spike episode yet, because this time we got past the sex-capades and into the raw emotion that is motivating their affair."
