= Villains (Buffy the Vampire Slayer) =

- Buffy the Vampire Slayer episode
- Episode no.: Season 6 Episode 20
- Directed by: David Solomon
- Written by: Marti Noxon
- Production code: 6ABB20
- Original air date: May 14, 2002

Guest appearances
- Danny Strong as Jonathan Levinson; Adam Busch as Warren Mears; Tom Lenk as Andrew Wells; Jeff Kober as Rack; Amelinda Embry as Katrina Silber; Amber Benson as Tara Maclay; James C. Leary as Clem; Steven W. Bailey as Cave Demon; Tim Hodgin as Coroner; Michael Matthys as Paramedic; Julie Hermelin as Clerk; Alan Henry Brown as Demon Bartender; Mueen J. Ahmad as Doctor; Jane Cho as Nurse #1; Meredith Cross as Nurse #2; David Adefeso as Paramedic #2; Jeffrey Nicholas Brown as Vampire; Nelson Frederick as Villager

Episode chronology
| ← Previous "Seeing Red" | Next → "Two to Go" |
- Buffy the Vampire Slayer season 6

"Villains" is the 20th episode of season 6 of the television series Buffy the Vampire Slayer. The episode aired on May 14, 2002 on UPN.

== Plot ==
An ambulance arrives at the Summers' house to treat Buffy, who has been wounded by Warren Mears's gun. Upstairs, a distraught Willow invokes Osiris to bring the murdered Tara back to life, but this is not possible, because the death did not involve magic. She leaves, learning from Xander that Warren had shot Buffy, but does not tell him that Warren had also killed Tara.

Warren celebrates at Willie's bar, bragging about killing the Slayer, until the TV news reports Buffy is still alive, with a vampire patron opining she will almost certainly come for revenge. Warren visits black magician Rack, seeking protection from Buffy, but Rack tells him Willow is who he should be worried about; terrified, Warren pays for Rack's help, but Rack warns him that the enraged Willow will likely overwhelm his defenses.

Willow goes to the magic shop. Despite Anya's attempt to stop her, she absorbs great power and transforms herself into a dark magician. She appears at the hospital, magically healing Buffy to help her capture Warren. Dawn returns home and finds Tara's body.

Xander and Buffy accompany Willow in her pursuit; Buffy tries to dissuade Willow from using magic, but Willow argues that Buffy's life was preserved only through her sorcery. They catch up to a bus on which Warren is apparently fleeing; Willow attempts to kill him, but finds "he" is only a robotic duplicate. She finally reveals Tara's death to Buffy and Xander. When they refuse to cooperate in Warren's execution, warning that the magic might corrupt her beyond redemption, she lashes out at them and vanishes.

Buffy and Xander return to the house and find Dawn with Tara's body. After the body is removed, they debate Warren's fate, with only Buffy unconvinced that he should be killed; but all agree Willow's intended vengeance will end up destroying her as well. Over Xander's objections, Buffy seeks Spike's aid, but learns he has left Sunnydale without explanation and Clem is house-sitting his crypt until he returns. Buffy then asks Clem to look after a reluctant Dawn while she tries to find Willow.

In Africa, Spike approaches a cave-living demon, seeking to undergo an ordeal to win his greatest desire: to be restored to what he once was. He feels that things have not been right since he had his chip inserted. The demon agrees, although he questions how Spike's feelings concerning the Slayer have led him to this.

Buffy and Xander ask Anya for help, and learn she has once again become a vengeance demon and is able to sense Willow's thirst for vengeance. Willow uses magic to locate Warren. She pursues him through a forest; he ambushes her and plunges an axe through her back. She recovers immediately, negates his magical defenses, and immobilizes him. As he taunts her, she realizes Warren has killed a woman before, and becomes more determined to execute him. She magically inflicts the pain of Tara's death on him by forcing a bullet through his chest. While Buffy and her companions approach, Warren begs for mercy. Willow kills him by flaying him, then disappears, vowing to kill his jailed partners.

== Themes ==
In Televised Morality, Gregory Stevenson uses this episode to support his claim that Buffy surrenders to authority, provided it does not conflict with her moral responsibility as the Slayer. Warren is human, and killed Tara with a human weapon; therefore from Buffy's perspective he should be punished by the human legal system. When Xander argues that they cannot rely on the legal system because it is inefficient and flawed, Buffy says "We can't control the universe."
