= Grave (Buffy the Vampire Slayer) =

- Buffy the Vampire Slayer episode
- Episode no.: Season 6 Episode 22
- Directed by: James A. Contner
- Written by: David Fury
- Production code: 6ABB22
- Original air date: May 21, 2002

Guest appearances
- Anthony Stewart Head as Rupert Giles; Danny Strong as Jonathan Levinson; Tom Lenk as Andrew Wells; Steven W. Bailey as Cave Demon

Episode chronology
← Previous "Two to Go"	Next → "Lessons"
- Buffy the Vampire Slayer season 6

"Grave" is the sixth-season finale of the television series Buffy the Vampire Slayer. The episode aired on May 21, 2002, on UPN. This episode is the second-highest-rated Buffy episode ever to air in the United Kingdom. Sky One aired the episode, which reached 1.22 million viewers on its original airing.

This is the only Buffy season finale not written and directed by Joss Whedon.

== Plot ==
Dark Willow tries to resist Giles's attack, rebuffing his attempts to help her. He is forced to bind her physically and magically. He informs Buffy and Anya that he has been endowed with magic from a powerful coven in England, which sent him to combat Willow. Privately, Buffy tells Giles about the difficulties she has endured the past year: Xander left Anya at the altar leading to her becoming a vengeance demon again, she has been working at the Doublemeat Palace to support Dawn amid financial problems, and she has been sleeping with Spike. Giles bursts into laughter, with Buffy following, but he then apologizes for leaving her when she needed help. She assures him he was right to do so: she had to face up to her responsibilities as an adult. She also confesses her insecurities to Giles on her reaction to being resurrected. As they talk, Willow subordinates Anya telepathically so that Anya breaks Giles's binding spells. Willow throws down Buffy and resumes her magical duel with Giles.

Xander and Dawn continue to protect Jonathan and Andrew, Xander feeling overwhelmed by guilt over his failure to act when Warren shot Buffy and murdered Tara. As Willow begins to overpower Giles, she also directs a magical attack at Xander, Dawn, and the others; forcing Buffy to leave to protect them. Willow then defeats Giles and drains his magical strength; the power breaks down her emotional barriers. Overwhelmed by her pain and all the pain that she senses, she announces that she will end it by ending the world. Buffy manages to partially block Willow's attack, but she and Dawn are thrown underground; while Xander is knocked unconscious. Andrew and Jonathan flee, planning an escape to Mexico.

At the Magic Box, Anya comes to and finds a critically wounded Giles on the ground. He can feel Dark Willow's presence and knows that she will end the world. Buffy tries to escape the hole by pulling coffins out of the surrounding dirt-walls to stack and try to climb out on. After Xander comes to, Buffy sends him to find some rope to help them get out. When Buffy and Dawn quarrel over Buffy's protective behavior, Anya briefly appears; telling them that Willow is raising Proserpexa - a satanic temple steeped in dark magic - from underground, and intends to use its artefacts to end the world by draining its life energies. Anya also relays Giles's message that Willow cannot be stopped by any magical or supernatural powers. Overhearing this, Xander leaves to confront Willow. Willow speaks to Buffy telepathically, telling her she deserves the right to die as a warrior; and raises earth-creatures to battle her and Dawn.

As Willow begins her final ritual of destruction, Xander confronts her and physically tries to stop her from completing it. She repels him with magic force, but - wounded - he renews his efforts. He reminds Willow of their friendship and that he loves her no matter what. He tells her that if she destroys the world, she kills him as well and that he will stay with her until she does. Willow's emotional barriers collapse, her dark powers drain away, and her physical transformation is undone. She collapses in tears. Giles revives and tells Anya that the magic Willow stole from him overpowered her emotional barriers and gave Xander the chance to reach her. Anya is shocked to learn that Xander saved the world. Buffy and Dawn reconcile, with Buffy apologizing for being blinded by her depression and vowing to be a better sister, and they clamber out of the pit.

In Africa, a severely bruised and bloodied Spike successfully completes his trials and demands his promised reward; his greatest desire. Accordingly, his soul is returned to him.

== Cultural references ==
The website Women at Warp compares the "sidekick-turned-supervillain" situation with the Star Trek: The Next Generation episode "The Nth Degree." "While Barclay's run as a supergenius in "The Nth Degree" is short-lived and Willow's progression into a black-magic-wielding ultra-witch spans multiple episodes, their arcs are strikingly similar. Both Barclay and Willow (particularly in the first 4 seasons) are depicted as meek and shy, cast in their own minds as the 'sidekick' to their more competent and powerful peers, respectively. When each is suddenly imbued with a terrifying amount of power, their friends fear how far they will go. Ultimately both must cope with returning to their former, less-powerful states, as well as living with the knowledge of the terror that they inflicted on the people they care about."
