= Jonathan M. Woodward =

American actor (born 1973)

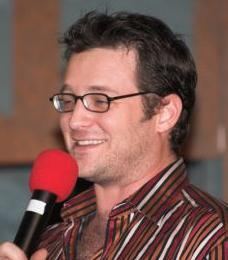
- Woodward in 2008
- Education: New York University (BA)

Jonathan M. Woodward is an American actor known for his roles in Buffy the Vampire Slayer, Angel, and Firefly.

== Early life and education ==
Woodward is the younger of two sons of an architect and a literacy teacher.

== Career ==
Woodward performed with Big Dance Company at Dance Theater Workshop, HERE Arts Center and the Viewpoints Conference in New York as well as the Exit and Via Festivals in France and the Polverigi Festival in Italy.

Woodward also appeared as Dr. Jason Posner in the 2001 film Wit, which was based on the play of the same name written by Margaret Edson.

Woodward is one of several actors to have crossed over onto three series created by Joss Whedon: Buffy the Vampire Slayer, Angel, and Firefly. He appeared as Holden Webster in the Buffy the Vampire Slayer episode "Conversations with Dead People", as Knox in the fourth and fifth seasons of the series Angel, and as Tracey in the Firefly episode "The Message". In 2010, he starred in the film Drones directed by Buffy alums Amber Benson and Adam Busch.

== Filmography ==
=== Film ===
Year	Title	Role	Notes
2002	Pipe Dream	Boyd	
2002	The Year That Trembled	Charlie Kerrigan	
2005	The Notorious Bettie Page	Marvin	
2010	Drones	Brian	

=== Television ===
Year	Title	Role	Notes
2000	Third Watch	Ross	Episode: "History"
2001	Wit	Dr. Jason Posner	Television film
2002	Diagnosis Murder: Town Without Pity	Bobby Wayne	Television film
2002	Buffy the Vampire Slayer	Holden Webster	Episode: "Conversations with Dead People"
2003	Firefly	Tracey Smith	Episode: "The Message"
2003–2004	Angel	Knox	7 episodes
2006	NCIS	Andy Nelson	Episode: "Once a Hero"
2015	Deadline: Crime with Tamron Hall	Charles	Episode: " Never Stop Looking"
2016	Unforgettable	Professor Dawes	Episode: "Breathing Space"
2018	Blue Bloods	Detective Anthony Palmer	Episode: "Meet the New Boss"
