= Andrew Wells =

Fictional character from Buffy the Vampire Slayer

- Buffy the Vampire Slayer / Angel character
- First appearance: "Flooded" (2001)
- Last appearance: Finale (2018)
- Created by: Joss Whedon; Jane Espenson; Douglas Petrie
- Portrayed by: Tom Lenk

In-universe information
- Affiliation: The Trio; Scooby Gang; Watchers' Council
- Classification: Watcher
- Notable powers: Skilled demon summoner and animal controller. Moderate fighting techniques and knowledge in demonology and the dark arts. Talented geneticist.

Andrew Wells is a fictional character in the television series Buffy the Vampire Slayer and Angel, played by Tom Lenk. The character also appears in Buffy the Vampire Slayer Season Eight, the canonical continuation of the series.

== Character history ==
Andrew Wells is the younger brother of Tucker Wells, who summoned hellhounds to attack the Prom in the season 3 episode "The Prom". Andrew himself has skills in demon-summoning and animal control, although these were never used after season 6; in the Buffy finale "Chosen" he credits his brother with having given him the courage to develop this talent.

At some point during Buffy's senior year in high school, he summoned "flying demon monkeys" to attack Sunnydale High's production of Romeo and Juliet, apparently for no other reason than to amuse himself. Years after the fact, both Jonathan (Danny Strong) and Warren (Adam Busch) recall the incident with amusement. The Scooby Gang have no memory of this whatsoever; viewers are left with the impression that the attack ranks among any number of less-memorable supernatural incidents which plagued Sunnydale. They also have no recollection of who Andrew is, until he informs them of his relation to Tucker. This becomes a running joke, as from then on, he is often referred to as "the other guy," "Tucker's brother," and so on.

=== The Trio ===
Andrew is introduced in season 6 as part of The Trio, a group of nerds who thought of themselves as supervillains. This group includes Jonathan, an acquaintance of Buffy and her friends, and Warren, a misogynist with delusions of grandeur. The Trio attempts a number of crimes that are usually thwarted by Buffy. These crimes are mostly harmless until Warren kills his ex-girlfriend Katrina. Buffy defeats them one more time during a robbery attempt; Warren escapes but Andrew and Jonathan get caught. Warren takes his revenge on Buffy by shooting her, accidentally killing Willow's girlfriend, Tara, in the process. In her grief, Willow kills Warren and attempts kill Andrew and Jonathan. Buffy breaks Andrew and Jonathan out of jail to keep them out of Willow's grasp. The duo escapes to Mexico before they can be brought back to jail.

=== Andrew's Return ===
While in Mexico, Andrew is visited by what he believes to be Warren's ghost but is actually an ancient entity called the First Evil. Andrew kills Jonathan under the influence of the First Evil and is eventually captured by Buffy and her friends. He is initially resentful of them but eventually shows remorse for his actions, especially for killing Jonathan, and joins them in their fight against the First Evil. He survives the final battle.

== Sexuality ==
Andrew is occasionally hinted to be gay in the series. However, in the Angel episode "The Girl in Question", Andrew is shown leaving for the opera with two attractive women, commenting that "people change". In January 2008, gay men's website AfterElton.com awarded Andrew the status as the tenth best gay or bisexual character in modern science fiction, despite commenting upon the textual ambiguity of Andrew's sexual orientation. This prompted creator Joss Whedon to more formally comment on Andrew's sexuality, on Whedonesque.com.

"It has to be said: the Andrew scene in 'The Girl in Question' was a victim of me dropping the ball. I specifically said there should be a party of men AND women, all glamorous and Italian, waiting for Andrew. I wasn't there when it was shot, and didn't have the time/money/energy to change it after the fact, though it made me crazy. Andrew's sexuality is always on the cusp of self-awareness because Andrew is stunted emotionally and because it's hilarious." [...] "The 'people change' thing is a hold-over from the fact that the scene was originally written for Dawn (but Michelle turned us down). The idea was, there's little Dawn, then in the last scene there's hot grown-up Dawn going out on the town, a heavy visual support of people changing (since Spike and Angel always see her as older brothers do)."

In November 2008, Tom Lenk came out as gay in The Advocate magazine. Joss Whedon was interviewed for the article, and revealed that it was decided that the character of Andrew was to be gay when they decided to cast Lenk in the role.

"Tom has a bit of a fey thing going on in his persona that, you know, you can't really deny. When I first looked at his audition tape, I said 'OK, he, uh, he seems kinda gay. Do we want to make that decision [about the character]? There's no reason why he couldn't be, so, great, let's pick the funniest actor.' [...] The character became very charming in his complete lack of awareness about, among other things, his own sexuality."

== Appearances ==
Andrew has been in 86 canonical Buffyverse appearances.

Buffy the Vampire Slayer

Andrew appeared in 26 episodes:

- Season 6 (2001–02): "Flooded", "Life Serial", "Smashed", "Gone", "Dead Things", "Normal Again", "Entropy", "Seeing Red", "Villains", "Two to Go", "Grave"
- Season 7 (2002–03): "Conversations with Dead People", "Never Leave Me", "Bring on the Night", "Showtime", "Potential", "The Killer in Me", "First Date", "Get It Done", "Storyteller", "Lies My Parents Told Me", "Dirty Girls", "Empty Places", "Touched", "End of Days", "Chosen"

Andrew appeared in 58 issues of the canonical comic series:

- Season 8 (2007–11): "The Long Way Home, Parts 2 & 3", "The Chain", "Wolves at the Gate, Parts 1-4", "Harmonic Divergence", "Predators and Prey", "Living Doll", "Retreat, Parts 1-5", "Turbulence", "Twilight, Parts 1-4", "Last Gleaming, Part 1"
- Season 9 (2011–13): "Freefall, Parts 1 & 3", "Apart (of Me), Parts 1-3", "Welcome to the Team, Parts 2-4", "The Watcher", "The Core, Parts 1-5"
- Season 10 (2014–16): "New Rules, Parts 1-5", "I Wish, Part 1", "Return to Sunnydale, Parts 1 & 2", "Love Dares You, Parts 1-3", "Old Demons, Parts 2 & 3", "In Pieces on the Ground, Parts 1, 3 & 4", "Own It, Parts 2-5"
- Season 11 (2016): "In Time of Crisis"
- Season 12 (2018): "The Reckoning", "The Finale"

Angel

Andrew appeared as a guest in 2 episodes:

- Season 5 (2003–04): "Damage", "The Girl in Question"
