= All the Way (Buffy the Vampire Slayer) =

- Buffy the Vampire Slayer episode
- Episode no.: Season 6 Episode 6
- Directed by: David Solomon
- Written by: Steven S. DeKnight
- Production code: 6ABB06
- Original air date: October 30, 2001

Guest appearances
- Anthony Stewart Head as Rupert Giles; John O'Leary as 'Old Man' Kaltenbach; Kavan Reece as Justin; Amber Tamblyn as Janice Penshaw; Dave Power as Zack; Amber Benson as Tara Maclay; Charles Duckworth as Glenn; Dawn Worrall as Christy; Emily Kay as Maria; Adam Gordon as Carl; Steven Anthony Lawrence as Chunky Kid; Sabrina Speer as Girl; Chad Erikson as Guy; Dominic Rambaran as Paramedic #1; Anthony Sago as Paramedic #2; Lorin Becker as Witch Woman; Lily Jackson as Witchy Poo

Episode chronology
← Previous "Life Serial"	Next → "Once More, with Feeling"
- Buffy the Vampire Slayer season 6

"All the Way" is the sixth episode of season six of Buffy the Vampire Slayer. The episode aired on October 30, 2001, on UPN.

One of the Halloween-themed episodes, it shows Dawn getting in trouble when she lies to Buffy about sleeping over at a friend's house, and encounters both a spooky house and vampires.

== Plot ==
It is Halloween and Anya has set the gang to work in the magic shop. She sends Buffy to the basement, where she runs into Spike. At his suggestion, Buffy attempts to leave to go patrol with Spike, but Giles points out that Halloween is an inactive day for most evil creatures, and engages Buffy in helping with bagging products.

An elderly man, Kaltenbach, is seen walking down the street humming "Pop Goes the Weasel" while carrying a bag of what appears to be groceries. He enters his home, peers out of a window at the children in costumes walking by, and says he will give them something "special" this year. He then pulls a large knife out of his kitchen drawer.

The Magic Box has enjoyed its busiest day ever, to Anya's delight. Xander decides that the time is right to announce his engagement to Anya, and the group makes its way back to Buffy's house to celebrate. Back at the Summers home, Willow conjures up decorations for the party, but Tara now shares Giles's concerns about Willow's frivolous use of magic. Willow brushes off these concerns.

Dawn tells Buffy that she is going to her friend Janice Penshaw's house, but really meets Janice and two older boys: Justin and Zack. Dawn becomes attracted to Justin. When the foursome stops in front of "old man" Kaltenbach's house, Dawn, on a dare, walks up to the porch to smash a pumpkin. She is caught by Kaltenbach, who warns her not to mess with them, then laughs and invites them all inside for a "special treat". Inside, Justin volunteers to help Kaltenbach with his preparations in the kitchen. The old man is about to cut into a baked dish when Justin, now revealed as a vampire, bites and drains him. Justin then returns to the others and announces that they need to flee because he stole the man's wallet.

Meanwhile, at the Summers home, Xander, who was already nervous in response to Giles's serious talk with him about his and Anya's future plans, becomes even more nervous when Anya chatters with Giles, Buffy and Xander about the wedding and plans for children.

On patrol, Buffy runs across an accident scene with a corpse that was left behind by Zack while he was stealing a car. While she is tracking the culprit, she encounters Spike, who passes on a message from Giles: Dawn has misled the adults regarding her plans for the night. Now the whole gang is on the case. At The Bronze, Willow wants to use an extremely risky spell – shifting everyone that except Dawn into an alternate dimension for a split-second – to locate Dawn, but Tara stops her, and an angry argument ensues.

In the stolen car, Justin drives Dawn and the others out into the forest and stops. Zack and Janice depart, leaving Justin and Dawn alone in the car. Justin kisses Dawn – her first kiss – and then reveals his vampire face. Dawn attempts to escape from Justin, but he catches her. Giles is quickly on the scene to help, but vampires emerge from several cars, ready to fight. As they close in, Spike and Buffy show up to assist. Dawn runs away from the fight, but Justin finds her. He attempts to change her, but as he is leaning in to bite her neck, Dawn stakes him with a crossbow bolt, fired earlier in the melee.

The gang returns home, where Buffy is quick to leave the job of chastising Dawn to Giles, who is unhappy about how Buffy is relying on him so much. Meanwhile, Willow casts a spell on Tara to make her forget their quarrel.

== Reception ==
In 2023, Vox ranked it at #131 on their "Worst to Best" list of all 144 episodes, writing, "'All the Way' is easily the weakest of Buffy's semiannual Halloween episodes (there's one in every even-numbered season). It spends a lot of time on Dawn and her teen angst — which is certainly understandable under the circumstances but also one of the least-developed arcs of season six — and it wastes a pre–Joan of Arcadia Amber Tamblyn. But the scenes of the Magic Box celebrating Halloween are fun, and Xander’s spontaneous declaration that 'I'm gonna marry that girl' while he watches Anya do her dance of capitalist superiority is one of that relationship's most sweetly romantic moments."

Similarly, Rolling Stone, ranked this episode at #137 in honor of the 20th anniversary of the show's ending.
