= Drones (2010 film) =

- Directed by: Amber Benson; Adam Busch
- Written by: Ben Acker; Ben Blacker
- Produced by: Adam Busch; James T. Bruce IV; Todd Gilbert; Jordan Kessler
- Starring: Jonathan M. Woodward; Samm Levine; James Urbaniak
- Cinematography: Dave McFarland
- Edited by: Peter Lindo
- Music by: Jonathan Dinerstein
- Production companies: Finish Films; Louisiana Media Productions
- Distributed by: Phase 4 Films
- Release date: January 23, 2010 (Slamdance)
- Running time: 98 minutes
- Country: United States
- Language: English
- Budget: $500,000

Drones is a 2010 office comedy film directed by Amber Benson and Adam Busch, who describe it as "The Office meets Close Encounters".

== Cast ==
- Jonathan M. Woodward as Brian
- Samm Levine as Clark
- James Urbaniak as Pete
- Dave Allen as Cooperman
- Tangi Miller as Miryam
- Marc Evan Jackson as Ian
- Angela Bettis as Amy
- Paul F. Tompkins as Jafe

== Production ==
Drones was filmed in the Baton Rouge area.

== Release ==
Drones premiered at the 2010 Slamdance Film Festival in January 2010.
