= Tabula Rasa (Buffy the Vampire Slayer) =

- Buffy the Vampire Slayer episode
- Episode no.: Season 6 Episode 8
- Directed by: David Grossman
- Written by: Rebecca Rand Kirshner
- Production code: 6ABB08
- Original air date: November 13, 2001

Guest appearances
- Anthony Stewart Head as Rupert Giles; Raymond O'Connor as Teeth, the Loan Shark; Amber Benson as Tara Maclay; Geordie White as Vamp #1; Stephen Triplett as Vamp #2; David Franco as Vamp #3

Episode chronology
← Previous "Once More, with Feeling"	Next → "Smashed"
- Buffy the Vampire Slayer season 6

"Tabula Rasa" is the eighth episode of season 6 of the television series Buffy the Vampire Slayer. The episode aired on November 13, 2001 on UPN. It explores the characters not as they are, but as they could be, after they lose their memory to a spell gone awry.

== Plot ==
Spike confronts Buffy about their sudden passionate kiss the previous night and she tells him it will never happen again, then defends him from an attack by a demon loan shark (in a visual pun, he is a demon with a shark's head, named "Teeth"). Willow, Xander, Anya and Tara discuss their discovery that they called Buffy back from Heaven, not Hell. Willow suggests fixing the mess with a spell and Tara confronts her about her excessive use of magic. At the threat of losing Tara, a desperate Willow pledges to go a week without magic.

At the Magic Box, Giles tells Buffy he is leaving for England so she can learn to stand on her own and Buffy takes the news very badly. With the gang on the way to the Magic Box for a meeting with Giles, Willow hangs back and begins another spell in the fireplace, using a crystal and some Lethe's Bramble (the forgetting herb) that will make Tara and Buffy forget their troubles. Pocketing the crystal, in her rush, she accidentally leaves a full bag of the herb on the hearth.

At the shop, Giles informs the Scoobies, including a disguised Spike (in a tweedy suit) on the run from the loan shark, that he is leaving, and Buffy tearfully reveals that she feels deserted by everyone. Back at the Summers' house, a spark from the fireplace sets the entire bag of Lethe's Bramble on fire, causing the whole gang to fall unconscious. They wake up that evening with no knowledge of who they are. Spike suspects Giles is his father (because they are both British and Giles feels a gut-wrenching disappointment towards him), Anya assumes she is marrying Giles (because she is wearing an engagement ring and they jointly own the magic shop) and Willow and Xander think they are a couple (because they woke up next to each other and Willow is wearing his jacket). Giles, Anya, Xander, Willow and Tara figure out their names from their IDs and Dawn's from her necklace. Spike assumes his name is "Randy" because of the label inside his coat, and Buffy, with no evidence to her identity, names herself "Joan".

A pair of the loan shark's vampire henchmen attack the shop, looking for Spike, and frighten the gang. Buffy discovers she has super strength when she stakes one of the vampires and saves Spike. Anya and Giles remain at the magic shop to work on spells, while Buffy and Spike head outside to fight more vampires and the rest of the Scoobies retreat to the sewers in an attempt to get to a hospital. Unfortunately, they are menaced by a vampire, too. When attacked, Spike unknowingly assumes his vampire visage, which sends Buffy running away in fear. When he catches up with her, Buffy attacks him and informs him that he is a vampire. He is confused, but assumes he is a good vampire because he does not want to hurt her. The loan shark and his minions attack the two and a fight ensues.

Back in the shop, Anya tries spells from a book and conjures numerous bunnies, frightening her and exasperating Giles. Giles and Anya fight while hiding behind the counter and Giles reveals that he found a one-way plane ticket in his pocket for London, assuming he must be abandoning Anya. Anya begs him not to leave her and they kiss passionately. In the sewer, Xander fights with the vampire chasing them and finally stakes it, but then accidentally steps on Willow's crystal, which fell from her pocket during the commotion. The crystal shatters and the spell is broken, finding Giles and Anya kissing, Willow atop Tara after a fall, and Spike and Buffy deep in mid-action conversation. Tara and the others in the sewer realize that Willow broke her promise not to use magic. With the spell broken and her memories rushing back, Buffy is momentarily too stunned to duck a few painful hits. Spike finishes off the rest of the vampires and promises to make up his debt to the intimidated loan shark.

Back at the house, Tara packs her belongings and leaves as Willow cries in another room. Giles takes his plane back to England. Spike finds Buffy at The Bronze, but she turns her face away and he stalks off. Later, however, she follows him and they kiss passionately beneath the stairs.

== Themes ==
StrangeAssembly.com notes that "the heart of the episode is the breakdown of the relationship between Willow and Tara ... perhaps we all forgave Willow a little too easily for what is essentially an extreme form of emotional abuse and gaslighting." Theresa Basile, in a series about consent issues in Buffy, says,

Willow's used to Tara being a completely supportive girlfriend – a cheerleader, if you will – and is uncomfortable with this change in the status quo of Tara challenging her. She doesn't want to see that Tara is still supporting her and is criticizing her use of magic to help her. She's too afraid of losing Tara, and she sees one fight leading to several fights that will lead to Tara abandoning her. ... A memory wipe would be an act of betrayal to anyone, but it's especially hurtful for Tara, someone who already had her mind and sanity horribly violated by Glory in season five. ... There's something called "informed consent," and Willow violated it. ... These episodes show that, when it comes to consent, the intention of the perpetrator doesn't matter. If you take away a person's memory because you’re a controlling asshole or if you take away a person's memory because you want things to be nice between you, the person is still violated either way.

== Cultural references ==
- The website Women at Warp compares the group amnesia in "Tabula Rasa" with the Star Trek: The Next Generation episode "Conundrum." "The Enterprise crew awakens after being scanned by an alien ship to discover they have no idea who they are. They have, however, retained their unique knowledge and skill sets. In Sunnydale, the gang wakes up to the same situation. Buffy doesn't know her name, but she still knows how to fight. Hijinks ensue all around, particularly romantic ones. The main difference lies in what causes the amnesia. For the TNG crew, an outsider hijacks their memories. The Scoobies' was caused by one of their own: Willow casting a spell."

== Reception ==
Reviewer Mark Oshiro writes,

"This episode is bookended in a very specific way, and it's done to ground us. The writers refuse to let us forget what happened in "Once More, with Feeling," and after a hilarious journey, that dread, terror, and sadness is brought right back to the fore. ... These are real people who are hurting one another, and a blank slate isn't going to solve that. ... While the character pairings and interactions were certainly quite humorous and were largely played that way, it's impossible to ignore how each of them also exacerbate the current tensions in the group. ... [T]his episode finally has a scene where the Scoobies just talk about what they've done by bringing Buffy back from the dead."

Reviewer Billie Doux rates the episode four stakes out of four and calls it "wonderful, very clever, very funny."
