= Are You Scared? =

- Directed by: Andy Hurst
- Written by: Andy Hurst
- Produced by: Michael Feifer
- Starring: Alethea Kutscher; Carlee Avers; Brad Ashten; Erin Consalvi; Soren Bowie; Brent Fidler; Caia Coley
- Distributed by: Revolver Entertainment
- Release date: September 12, 2006
- Running time: 79 minutes
- Country: United States
- Language: English

Are You Scared? is a 2006 American horror film directed by Andy Hurst, and released by Revolver Entertainment. It stars Carlee Avers, Brad Ashten, and Soren Bowie.

An unrelated sequel, called Are You Scared 2, was released in 2009.

== Plot ==
Six young people wake up in an abandoned building, with no idea of what is going on or how they got there. A mysterious figure speaks to them over a PA system and tells them that they are on a game show called Are You Scared? They will have to face their deepest fears in order to win the contest. However, their challenges are real – and deadly. The show involves several "contests", each of which result in the grisly deaths of the contestants, including death by acid, explosion, shotgun, hungry rats, strangulation, power drill, and decapitation. In between these segments, a police officer and an FBI agent search for the villain.

At the climax of the film, we discover that the villain is the abusive father of the Final Girl, Kelly. He was burned in a fire by Kelly and her mother, and has been playing this 'game' over and over in order to seek revenge. Kelly seemingly defeats her father by setting him on fire (again), and she and her mother escape.

In the final scene, Kelly is watching a television newscast, when her father, mysteriously still alive, breaks into her apartment and comes up behind her.

== Cast ==
- Alethea Kutscher as Kelly
- Erin Consalvi as Cherie
- Carlee Avers as Laura
- Brad Ashten as Brandon
- Kariem Markbury as Jason
- Soren Bowie as Dylan
- Eric Francis as Det. Jay Bowman
- Jennifer Cozza as Christine Robinson
- Brent Fidler as Shadow Man / Kelly's Father
- Madison Petrich as Tara

== Reception ==
Professional critiques for Are You Scared? have been predominantly negative. Scott Foy called the film "Saw for Dummies" and a "shameless knock-off" of the more successful Saw series. He ended his review with the statement, "No, I was not scared." Slasherpool, however, was "surprised by how decent it turned out to be," citing it as "idiotic" but "mildly entertaining," "as far as rip-offs go." Steve Anderson of AcidLogic.com called it "a mixed bag of entertainment options" that adds a small amount of originality by including a reality show aspect with its influence from Saw.
