= Jonathan Levinson =

Character from Buffy the Vampire Slayer

- Buffy the Vampire Slayer character
- Danny Strong as Jonathan Levinson
- First appearance: "Inca Mummy Girl" (1997)
- Last appearance: "Storyteller" (2003)
- Created by: Joss Whedon; Matt Kiene; Joe Reinkemeyer
- Portrayed by: Danny Strong

In-universe information
- Affiliation: The Trio
- Classification: Sorcerer
- Notable powers: Powerful magical abilities

Jonathan Levinson is a fictional character created by Joss Whedon for the television series Buffy the Vampire Slayer. The character is portrayed by Danny Strong.

Jonathan was initially a student at Sunnydale High. A social outcast, the character would later turn to crime as a member of the Trio.

== Character development ==
Strong described the early development of his character in an interview with the U.K. Buffy the Vampire Slayer magazine. He described his character as the "Kenny of Buffy. Except that he never dies." Strong had initially auditioned for the role of Xander, but lost out to Nicholas Brendon. He first appeared in the unaired Buffy the Vampire Slayer pilot in a bit part simply named "Student", and subsequently appeared in a number of episodes. He said that often he appeared in scenes that could have been done by other characters but that "They'll have Jonathan do it, to keep the continuity of the world".

Writer/directors David Greenwalt and Marti Noxon both stated in the DVD commentaries for "Reptile Boy" and "What's My Line", respectively, that Danny Strong was the actor that they would call on whenever they needed a good victim, both citing his good "victim face". Eventually the character grew out of this frequent use.

Explaining the potential appeal of the character, he said, "I think everyone is sort of like Jonathan. Either they're like Jonathan or they're trying to cover up their Jonathan qualities. Either they're awkward and shy, or they're doing everything they can not to appear awkward and shy. I'm not really very shy, but I certainly can be awkward at times."

== Appearances ==
Jonathan made 34 canonical Buffyverse appearances.

Buffy the Vampire Slayer

Jonathan appeared as a guest in 28 episodes:

- Season 2 (1997–98): "Inca Mummy Girl", "Reptile Boy", "What's My Line, Part 2", "Bad Eggs", "Passion", "Go Fish"
- Season 3 (1998–99): "Dead Man's Party", "Homecoming", "The Wish", "Earshot", "The Prom", "Graduation Day, Part 2"
- Season 4 (2000): "Superstar"
- Season 6 (2001–02): "Flooded", "Life Serial", "Smashed", "Gone", "Dead Things", "Normal Again", "Entropy", "Seeing Red", "Villains", "Two to Go", "Grave"
- Season 7 (2002–03): "Conversations with Dead People", "Never Leave Me", "First Date", "Storyteller"

Jonathan appeared in 6 issues:

- Season 10 (2014, 2016): "Return to Sunnydale, Parts 1 & 2", "In Pieces on the Ground, Part 3", "Own It, Parts 2, 4 & 5"
