= Warren Mears =

Fictional character from Buffy the Vampire Slayer

- Buffy the Vampire Slayer character
- Adam Busch as Warren Mears
- First appearance: "I Was Made to Love You"
- Last appearance: Buffy the Vampire Slayer Season Eight
- Created by: Joss Whedon, Jane Espenson
- Portrayed by: Adam Busch

In-universe information
- Affiliation: Andrew Wells, Jonathan Levinson, Amy Madison
- Classification: Technology expert
- Notable powers: A genius-level intellect, especially in the fields of technology and robotics

Warren Mears is a fictional character that is portrayed by Adam Busch in the American television series Buffy the Vampire Slayer. The character also appears in canonical comic book series continuation of that series. He is the main antagonist in season 6, until Willow turns to her dark side and kills him for murdering her girlfriend, Tara.

== Characterization ==
Actor Adam Busch claims that he does not see Warren as simply a villain or purely evil person. He explains that the character has various flaws and positives, and is always given the chance to redeem himself. "He's always given that moment where he can do the right thing that he never ever does," says Busch. "Because he is flawed and he does have a lot of issues and an inability to communicate or talk to anyone or really explain what it is that he wants." Writer Jane Espenson draws a parallel between Warren and Buffy Summers: "When Buffy's talking with Warren about his break-up with April, she's actually identifying with him, because she did a lot of the same stuff with Riley that he did with April."

Warren forms alliances with Andrew Wells, summoner of demons; and Jonathan Levinson, caster of spells. Together, the three are known as "The Trio." The Trio strive to neutralize Buffy, the Slayer, and thus the primary obstacle to their ultimate goal of taking over Sunnydale. Though initially comic relief and little more than a nuisance to the Scooby Gang, they take a darker turn by the episode "Dead Things". Most of their schemes combine science and mysticism, and they are able to avoid detection by the Scoobies (who merely assume their activities to be the doings of demons) until halfway through the season.

== Appearances ==
Warren has made 31 canonical Buffyverse appearances.

=== Buffy the Vampire Slayer ===
Adam Busch appeared as Warren in 16 episodes:

- Season 5 (2001): "I Was Made to Love You", "Intervention"
- Season 6 (2001–02): "Flooded", "Life Serial", "Smashed", "Gone", "Dead Things", "Normal Again", "Entropy", "Seeing Red", "Villains"
- Season 7 (2002–03): "Lessons", "Conversations with Dead People", "Never Leave Me", "The Killer in Me", "Storyteller"

Warren appeared in 15 issues:

- Season 8 (2007–10): "The Long Way Home, Parts 3 & 4", "Time of Your Life, Parts 1 & 4", "Retreat, Parts 1, 2 & 5", "Twilight, Parts 1-4", "Last Gleaming, Parts 1, 3 & 4", "Always Darkest"

== See also ==
- List of Buffyverse villains and supernatural beings
