= Buffy Summers =

Lead character of Buffy the Vampire Slayer

- Buffy the Vampire Slayer / Angel character
- Sarah Michelle Gellar as Buffy Summers in the episode "Crush" (2001)
- First appearance: Buffy the Vampire Slayer (1992)
- Created by: Joss Whedon
- Portrayed by: Kristy Swanson (film); Sarah Michelle Gellar (TV series)
- Voiced by: Giselle Loren

In-universe information
- Title: The Slayer
- Family: Hank Summers (father); Joyce Summers (mother); Dawn Summers (sister)
- Relatives: Arlene (aunt); Celia (cousin)
- Nationality: American

Buffy Anne Summers is the title character of the Buffy the Vampire Slayer franchise. She first appeared in the 1992 film Buffy the Vampire Slayer before going on to appear in The WB/UPN 1997–2003 television series and subsequent 1998–2018 Dark Horse and 2019–present Boom! Studios comic series of the same name. The character has also appeared in the spin-off series Angel, as well as numerous expanded universe materials such as novels and video games. Buffy was portrayed by Kristy Swanson in the film and by Sarah Michelle Gellar in the television series. Giselle Loren has lent her voice to the character in both the Buffy video games and an unproduced animated series, while Kelly Albanese lent her voice to the character in the Buffy the Vampire Slayer Season Eight motion comics.

Buffy Summers is the protagonist of the series, which depicts her life and adventures as she grows up. In the film, she is a high school cheerleader who learns that she is the Slayer (a Chosen One gifted with the strength and skills to fight vampires and the forces of darkness, as a vampire hunter and demon hunter). The television series shows Buffy carrying out her destiny in the small town of Sunnydale, built atop a portal to hell (Hellmouth), surrounded by a group of friends and family who support her in her mission. In the comic book continuation, she is a young woman who has accepted her duties and is now responsible for training others like her.

Buffy was created by Joss Whedon to subvert the stereotypical female horror film victim—Whedon wanted to create a strong female cultural icon. In 2004, Buffy was ranked 13th on Bravo's list of The 100 Greatest TV Characters. In June 2010, Entertainment Weekly ranked her third in its list of the 100 Greatest Characters of the Last 20 Years. AOL named her the sixth Most Memorable Female TV Character. She was ranked at No. 5 in AfterEllen.com's Top 50 Favorite Female TV Characters. Buffy Summers is now viewed as one of the greatest and most iconic roles of all time.

== Appearances ==
=== Film ===
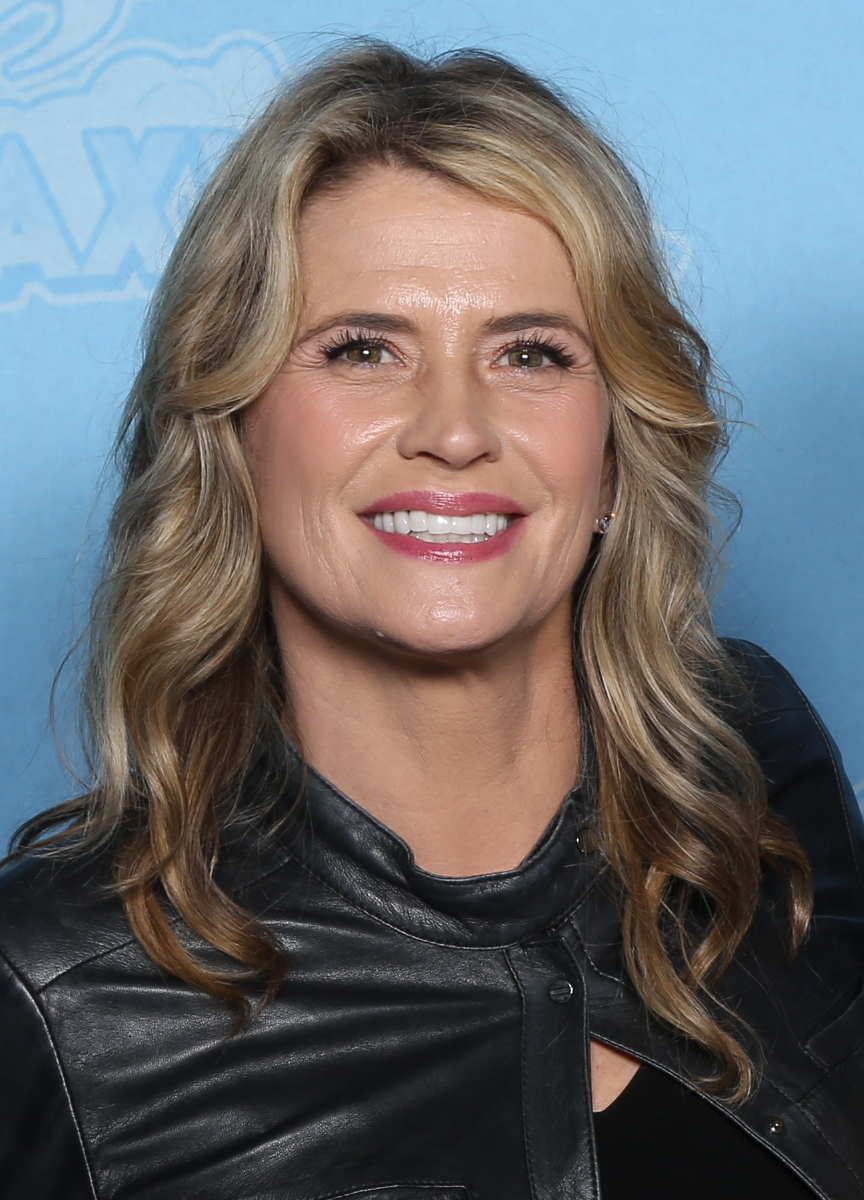
Kristy Swanson (pictured in 2019) first portrayed Buffy, in the 1992 film, Buffy the Vampire Slayer.

The character of Buffy first appears in the 1992 film, Buffy the Vampire Slayer, played by Kristy Swanson. The film, written by Joss Whedon, depicts Buffy as a shallow high school cheerleader who is informed by a man named Merrick (Donald Sutherland) that she has been chosen by fate to battle the undead. Buffy reluctantly undergoes training in her abilities by Merrick, and as her responsibility as the Slayer causes her to become alienated from her valley girl peers, she finds friendship and romance with fellow outcast Pike (Luke Perry). Merrick eventually comes to respect Buffy's rebellious nature, and she defeats vampire king Lothos (Rutger Hauer) by relying on her own contemporary style as opposed to traditional Slayer conventions. Although this film is not in continuity with the later television series, in 1999, author Christopher Golden adapted Joss Whedon's original script into a comic book entitled "The Origin", which Whedon later confirmed to be "pretty much" canonical.

On May 25, 2009, The Hollywood Reporter revealed Roy Lee and Doug Davison of Vertigo Entertainment would be working with Fran Rubel Kuzui and Kazi Kuzui on a relaunch of the Buffy series for the big screen. The series would not be a sequel or prequel to the existing movie or television franchise and Joss Whedon will have no involvement in the project. None of the cast or original characters from the television series will be featured. Television series executive producer Marti Noxon later reflected that this story might have been produced by the studio to frighten Joss into taking reins of the project. Studio interest in the project has continued, however. A script was rejected in 2011.

=== Television ===
Buffy returned in Joss Whedon's television series Buffy the Vampire Slayer, this time played by Sarah Michelle Gellar for all of the show's 144 episodes. In season 1 (1997), after her parents' divorce and being expelled from Hemery High School after burning a gymnasium full of vampires, Buffy begins to accept the responsibilities and dangers of her calling as the Slayer after moving to the small California town of Sunnydale. She becomes best friends with Xander Harris (Nicholas Brendon) and Willow Rosenberg (Alyson Hannigan), and meets her new Watcher, the school librarian, Rupert Giles (Anthony Stewart Head). Together they form the Scooby Gang, and work together to battle various supernatural occurrences which plague Sunnydale High. In the season finale, Buffy battles the vampiric villain known as the Master (Mark Metcalf), and is drowned in the process. She is resuscitated by Xander and rises to defeat the vampire lord.

In the show's second season (1997–1998), Buffy continues to come to terms with her destiny, finds forbidden love with benevolent vampire Angel (David Boreanaz), and clashes with new villains Spike (James Marsters) and Drusilla (Juliet Landau). She also meets her Slayer replacement, Kendra (Bianca Lawson), who was called when Buffy was killed by the Master. Kendra is later killed by Drusilla, and the next replacement is seen in season 3. In the episode "Surprise", Buffy loses her virginity to Angel, an event which triggers the loss of his soul and unleashes his sadistic alter-ego, Angelus. Angelus proceeds to subject the characters to mental and physical torture for the remainder of the season. In the final episode of season 2, Buffy is forced to reveal her identity as the Slayer to her mother (Kristine Sutherland), and send the newly good Angel to hell to save the world. She then leaves Sunnydale for Los Angeles in the hopes of escaping her life as the Slayer.

Season 3 (1998–1999) sees Buffy reconnect to her calling, her friends, and her family after her departure, as well as make difficult life decisions regarding her relationship with the resurrected Angel. She must also deal with the introduction of rebellious new Slayer Faith (Eliza Dushku), who becomes increasingly destructive and disloyal over the course of the season. In the season finale, Buffy stabs Faith in an attempt to save Angel's life, and leads her classmates into a climactic battle against the demonic Mayor of Sunnydale (Harry Groener). Angel then leaves Sunnydale in hopes that Buffy can have a more normal life without him.

In the fourth season (1999–2000), Buffy balances her Slayer duties with her new life as a college student at UC Sunnydale. She experiences some difficulty adjusting to college life, and becomes increasingly disconnected from her friends, who all seem to be moving in different directions. Buffy eventually finds a new love interest in the form of Riley Finn (Marc Blucas), a soldier in the demon-hunting government task force known as The Initiative. She briefly joins forces with Riley's team, until they discover one of the Initiative's experiments, Adam (George Hertzberg), is creating an army of demon-human hybrids. Buffy unites with her friends to defeat Adam in a spell which invokes the power of the First Slayer. During Buffy season 4, Buffy also appears in the first season of spin-off series Angel (1999–2000), guest starring in the episodes "I Will Remember You" and "Sanctuary".

In season 5 (2000–2001), Buffy battles the hell-goddess Glory (Clare Kramer), and fully embraces her destiny for the first time. A younger sister named Dawn (Michelle Trachtenberg) mysteriously appears in Buffy's household, her existence having been seamlessly integrated with memories of the other characters. Buffy suffers emotional turmoil throughout this season, including the realization Dawn is not actually her sister, the deterioration of her relationship with Riley, the discovery that Spike has fallen obsessively in love with her, and her mother's death from a brain aneurysm. She takes control of her destiny and duties, informing the Watchers' Council that they work for her, not the other way around; that their job is to supply her with whatever information she requires, immediately and fully. While on a quest to learn more about her nature as the Slayer, Buffy is told "death is her gift", a message she has difficulty understanding until the episode "The Gift", in which she sacrifices herself to save Dawn and the world by diving into Glory's interdimensional portal and closing it.

Season 6 (2001–2002) depicts Buffy's struggle with depression after her friends, believing she was trapped in a Hell dimension, performed a spell to bring her back from the dead; however, she was actually in Heaven, and feels great loss after being ripped out. Forced to take a mundane and degrading job slinging burgers at the Doublemeat Palace after realizing her family was in financial ruin, she sinks into a deep depression amid feelings of self-loathing and spends much of the season on a downward spiral alienating her friends and family and embarking on a violent sexual relationship with the vampire Spike which leaves neither satisfied and spawns dire consequences for the both of them. Aside from dealing with her emotional and psychological demons in this season, Buffy is continually targeted by a group calling themselves The Trio - Warren Mears (Adam Busch), Andrew Wells (Tom Lenk), and Jonathan Levinson (Danny Strong). Initially satisfied with only wreaking havoc for personal gain in Sunnydale, the Trio soon become bent on becoming powerful nemeses to the Slayer. At first, their activities are merely annoying to Buffy and the Scoobies, but Warren's intentions become darker as the season goes on, and by the end Buffy is forced to deal with the Trio as the Slayer, while Andrew and Jonathan must come to grips with Warren's betrayal against them. As the season draws to a close, Buffy is forced to battle her best friend when Willow becomes psychotic with dark magic after Warren shoots and kills Willow's girlfriend Tara (Amber Benson) and wounds Buffy in the process. Willow then tries to destroy the world to end all suffering, although Xander gets through to her in the end. Buffy then promises to change her self-destructive behavior to be there for her sister.

In the final season of the show (2002–2003), things start to come around for Buffy when Principal Robin Wood (D. B. Woodside) hires her as a school counselor for the newly rebuilt Sunnydale High School and she has repaired her relationships with Dawn and her friends. However, she is also confronted with the threat of the First Evil and becomes a reluctant leader to the Potential Slayers, who are initially respectful of her, but become increasingly more alienated by her tactics and decisions throughout the season. She unexpectedly becomes emotionally close with Spike, who has sought out his soul in an effort to prove himself to her. In the show's final episode "Chosen", Buffy shares her power with her fellow Slayers before leading them into an epic battle against an army of Turok-Han vampires. She also confesses her love to a disbelieving Spike before he sacrifices himself to save the world; as he dies, Buffy escapes Sunnydale's destruction with the surviving characters.

Following the end of Buffy the Vampire Slayer, the character maintains a presence in the fifth season of Angel (2003–2004), but does not appear onscreen. In the episode "The Girl in Question", Angel and a resurrected Spike travel to Rome to find her, where they learn she is apparently now dating the Immortal. Sarah Michelle Gellar was approached to appear as Buffy in Angel's one hundredth episode, but declined, so the character of Cordelia Chase (Charisma Carpenter) was used instead. She was asked to appear in the second to last episode of the series, "Power Play", but had to decline due to outside conflicts.

Between 2001 and 2004, Joss Whedon and Jeph Loeb developed a 4-minute pilot episode for Buffy the Animated Series, which was set during the show's first season. Had the series been picked up by a network, the series would have focused upon Buffy (voiced by Giselle Loren) in more high-school adventures. Following a 2008 leak of the pilot to YouTube, Loeb expressed some hope the series may be resurrected in some form.

=== Literature ===
As the main character of the franchise, Buffy appears in almost all Buffy the Vampire Slayer literature. This includes a Dark Horse ongoing comic book and a series of novels. Buffy's debut into literature came in the comic Dark Horse Presents 1998 Annual on August 26, 1998, while her first prose appearance was in Halloween Rain by Christopher Golden and Nancy Holder on October 5, 1998. Most of these stories occur between episodes and seasons of the television series, however, some are set outside the timeline of the show to explore in depth other areas of Buffy's history. Christopher Golden adapted the film into a comic entitled "The Origin" (1999) which more closely resembles Joss Whedon's original script. In 2003, Scott Lobdell and Fabian Nicieza wrote a Year One-style run on the Buffy comic book series which filled the gap between the film and the first season of the show. These stories explain how Buffy's relationship with Pike ended, as well as fleshing out events alluded to in the television series, such as the time she spent in a mental institution and her parents' divorce. The novel Queen of the Slayers (2005) by Nancy Holder offers a potential follow-up to the television series; set after season 7, it depicts Buffy living in Italy with the morally ambiguous Immortal.

Buffy also makes appearances in literature outside of her own titular series. In the Tales of the Slayers comic one-shot "Broken Bottle of Djinn" (2002) by Doug Petrie and Jane Espenson, Buffy battles a spirit in Sunnydale High, while the Tales of the Vampires comic book story "Antique" (2004) by Drew Goddard sees her breaking into Dracula's castle to rescue Xander from the infamous vampire. Volume II of the similar series of novels Tales of the Slayer (2003) features two stories about Buffy; the character battles a mummified spirit in Todd A. McIntosh's "All That You Do Comes Back Unto Thee", while Jane Espenson's "Again Sunnydale" sees a season 6-era Buffy sent back in time to high school, when her mother is still alive but Dawn does not exist.

==== Post-television "Season" continuations ====
In 2007, Buffy's story continued on from season 7 when Joss Whedon revived Buffy the Vampire Slayer as a comic book, again published by Dark Horse. Whedon differentiated these comics from previous Buffy literature, stating "We could do something and for once we could make it canon. We could make it officially what happened after the end of the show." The continuation series emulates the structure of a television series, with five "seasons" published between 2007 and 2018 and Whedon overseeing multiple writers in the role of "executive producer".

Buffy appears in literature such as the Buffy the Vampire Slayer Season Eight comic book series and various spin-offs. Art by Jo Chen.

In Season Eight (2007–2011), it is quickly established that Buffy is not living with the Immortal in Rome as previously suggested in Angel; this is simply a cover story to ensure her safety as she is now the leader of an army which recruits and trains Slayers to deal with demonic threats worldwide. However, a mysterious group led by the masked villain Twilight believe the Slayers themselves pose a danger to mankind and the natural order. In "Wolves at the Gate", a lonely Buffy shares a sexual encounter with a younger Slayer Satsu; the relationship ends soon after when Satsu accepts that Buffy does not return her romantic feelings. The time travel story "Time of Your Life" acts as a crossover with Buffy spin-off Fray; Buffy is kidnapped two centuries into the future and meets her eventual successor Melaka Fray and Fray's vampire twin brother Harth. These events have been orchestrated by a villainous future version of Willow, whom Buffy reluctantly kills to return home. The tensions between Buffy and Twilight's respective armies eventually erupts into a full-scale war in Tibet; Twilight is unmasked as Angel being manipulated by enigmatic cosmic forces trying to destroy the universe and usher in a new dimension where Buffy and Angel will live together in paradise. However, Buffy rejects Twilight's influence and saves her world by returning to the ruins of Sunnydale and smashing the Seed of Wonder, cutting Earth off from the source of all magic in the process. During these events, Buffy reunites with Spike, Giles is killed by a Twilight-controlled Angel, and the Slayer army is dissolved; Buffy moves to San Francisco with her friends to grieve their losses.

In contrast to the global scale of Season Eight, Season Nine (2011–2013) follows Buffy living a more grounded civilian life in San Francisco; she works in a local coffee shop and shares an apartment with roommates Anaheed and Tumble. Buffy is now a pariah in the supernatural community due to her destruction of magic and must deal with "zompires", a feral new breed of vampires which have emerged since demons can no longer access Earth and fully possess human bodies. After getting blackout drunk at her housewarming party, Buffy has a pregnancy scare and turns to Spike for support when she decides to have an abortion; the pregnancy turns out to be a misunderstanding caused by Andrew, who switched Buffy's body with a robot as part of a misguided plan to keep her safe. In "Guarded", Buffy explores new career opportunities by temporarily joining Kennedy's private security company Deepscan and shutting down TinCan, an interdimensional social media site run by long-term Angel villains Wolfram & Hart. With most of her existing relationships strained, Buffy makes new allies in SFPD homicide detective Dowling and teenage vampire hunter Billy, and joins a magical council alongside demons D’Hoffryn and Illyria to battle the evil Slayer Simone and magic-siphoning Severin. When Dawn starts fading from existence due to the absence of magic, Buffy reunites with Willow and Xander in "The Core" to save her, journeying deep within the Earth to create a new Seed of Wonder and battling Maloker, an Old One and progenitor of all vampires, in the process. During Season Nine, Buffy also makes minor appearances in the spin-off comics Spike: A Dark Place, Willow: Wonderland, and Angel & Faith.

Having restored magic to the world, Season Ten (2014–2016) picks up with Buffy and her friends reluctantly responsible for creating the laws governing it; Buffy must guard the ancient grimoire Vampyr in which the new laws of magic are formalized when recorded in the book. Some rules have already materialized without Buffy's input (zompires are extinct and vampires now possess heightened strength and shapeshifting powers) and new rules tend to have unforeseen Monkey's Paw-style consequences. Daunted and tempted by this new-found power, Buffy seeks the advice of D’Hoffryn and his magical council, as well as lobbyists from various mystical and demonic communities pursuing their own conflicting agendas. Meanwhile, Buffy and Spike's decision to pursue an official romantic relationship is complicated by the manipulations of the demon Archaeus and the subsequent assistance by Angel; in the one-shot issue "Triggers", Buffy expresses her repressed trauma over the sexual assault she experienced from soulless Spike back in the television episode "Seeing Red". Following his resurrection in the spin-off series Angel & Faith, Giles reunites with Buffy, and the paternal relationship they share is reaffirmed when Buffy's father Hank excludes her from his wedding. D’Hoffryn eventually turns on Buffy and murders the rest of the council to seize the power of Vampyr for himself; finally accepting the responsibility she has been avoiding, Buffy outsmarts D’Hoffryn, commits to her relationship with Spike, and organizes her own council with whom to codify the laws of magic.

Season Eleven (2016–17) opens in disaster when a huge Shenlong dragon attacks San Francisco, killing thousands. In response to public outrage, the US President Malloy introduces the Supernatural Crisis Act, a set of new policies claiming to "legalize and normalise" the supernatural; this begins with a census and quickly leads to the relocation of magical individuals to the "Safe Zone", an internment camp in the Grand Canyon. Buffy rejects an opportunity to join a Slayer peacekeeping force alongside the antagonistic Jordan, and instead opts to join Willow and Spike at the Safe Zone, where she does her best to maintain peace and protect innocent or harmless inmates. Buffy and Willow eventually agree to have their powers removed to leave the camp and further investigate the Pandora Project, a government conspiracy to drain and abuse magical energy; they expose White House Press Secretary Joanna Wise for summoning the Shenlong in the first place to put her plans in motion. Buffy briefly reabsorbs the power of all the Slayers in the world to battle the magic-infused Wise, but returns the power by the season's final issue, warning a repentant Jordan not to misuse it.

In 2018, it was announced that Dark Horse was losing the license to publish Buffy comics; Joss Whedon's intent for the final season was to "give the Dark Horse era some closure". The four-issue Buffy the Vampire Slayer Season Twelve: The Reckoning (2018) picks up one year after Season Eleven, with a thirty-year-old Buffy pondering her future; she is separated but on cordial terms with Spike, still working as a part-time police consultant, and a doting aunt to Dawn and Xander's baby daughter Joyce. Tying up story elements first alluded to in 2001's Fray, Buffy is warned about an apocalypse called "the Reckoning" led by time travelling vampire Harth, in which the Slayers are depowered and Buffy is banished to a hell dimension battling an army of demons. With help from her friends, and those of Angel and Fray, Buffy proactively takes the fight to Harth in an attempt to change her fate; Illyria sacrifices herself to banish the demons in Buffy's place, altering history. After the battle, Buffy becomes a fulltime member of the SFPD supernatural division alongside Faith, reconnects with Spike, and comforts a grieving Angel over Illyria. Meanwhile, unbeknownst to Buffy, Fray returns to the 23rd century to discover her world has been drastically improved by the continued presence of many Slayers.

==== Boom! Studios reboot ====
In 2019, Buffy was reinvented by Boom! Studios in their ongoing comic Buffy the Vampire Slayer. This series is a complete reboot and has no continuity with any previous stories; Buffy is depicted as a teenager in 2019 rather than the 1990s. She is already aware of her destiny as the Slayer and has been living in Sunnydale for only three weeks when the series begins. She befriends Willow and Xander after saving them from a vampire outside Tunaverse, the fast food restaurant where she works.

== Concept and creation ==
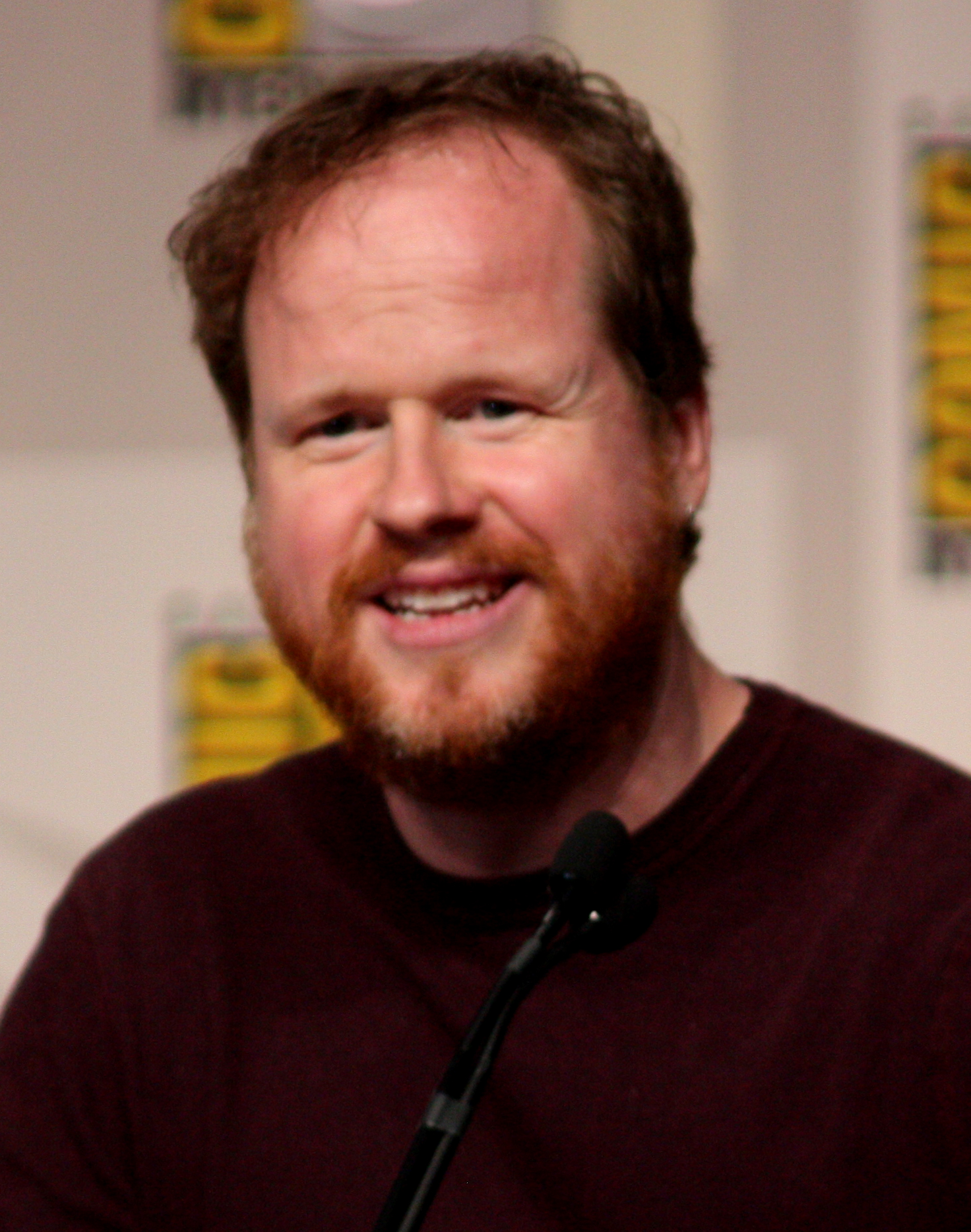
Buffy creator Joss Whedon in 2009

An early influence for Buffy was Kelli Maroney's character in the 1984 science-fiction horror film Night of the Comet. The character of Buffy was conceived by Joss Whedon as a way of subverting the cliché of "the little blonde girl who goes into a dark alley and gets killed in every horror film". Whedon stated "Rhonda the Immortal Waitress" was the first incarnation of Buffy in his head, "the idea of a seemingly insignificant female who in fact turns out to be extraordinary." When asked how he came up with the name of "Buffy," Whedon states "It was the name that I could think of that I could take the least seriously. There is no way you could hear the name Buffy and think, 'This is an important person.' To juxtapose that with Vampire Slayer, just felt like that kind of thing—a B movie. But a B movie that had something more going on. That was my dream." Whedon claims the title was criticized for being too silly, and the television network begged him to change it. He refused, insisting "You don't understand. It has to be this. This is what it is." Jason Middleton feels that Buffy avoids the "final girl" character trope seen in horror films, where the androgynous and celibate heroine gets to outlive her friends and exact revenge on their killer; in Middleton's words, "she... gets to have sex with boys and still kill the monster".

Whedon always intended for the character to become an icon, claiming "I wanted her to be a hero that existed in people's minds the way Wonder Woman or Spider-Man does, you know? I wanted her to be a doll or an action figure. I wanted Barbie with Kung Fu grip! I wanted her to enter the mass consciousness and the imaginations of growing kids because I think she's a cool character, and that was always the plan. I wanted Buffy to be a cultural phenomenon, period." In developing Buffy, Whedon was greatly inspired by Kitty Pryde, a character from the pages of the superhero comic X-Men. He admits, "If there's a bigger influence on Buffy than Kitty, I don't know what it was... She was an adolescent girl finding out she has great power and dealing with it." In a 2009 interview, Whedon revealed he only recently realised how much he saw of himself in Buffy. After years of relating more to Xander, he says, "Buffy was always the person that I was in that story because I'm not in every way." Whedon openly wonders why his identification figure is a woman, but describes it as "a real autobiographical kind of therapy for me" to be writing a strong female character like Buffy.

According to Whedon, Buffy "had been brewing in [him] for many years" before finally appearing in the Buffy the Vampire Slayer film played by Kristy Swanson. However, he was not satisfied with the character's treatment in the film, feeling "that's not quite her. It's a start, but it's not quite the girl." Although Whedon's vision of female empowerment was not as apparent as he would have liked in the 1992 film, he was given a second chance when Gail Berman approached him with the idea of re-creating it as a television series. Adapting the concept of the movie into a television series, Whedon decided to reinvent the character of Buffy slightly. The shallow cheerleader of the original film had grown more mature and open-minded, identifying with social outcasts such as Willow and Xander, and instead, the character of Cordelia was created to embody what Buffy once was. Early in the television series, make-up supervisor Todd McIntosh was instructed to make Buffy "a soft and sort of earthy character." He gave Gellar a soft, muted green make-up and kept her look very natural. However, it was later decided this was inappropriate for the character, and Buffy needed to look more like a valley girl. McIntosh switched her make-up around, giving her frosted eyeshadow and lip colors, bright turquoise and aqua marines, bubblegum colored nails, and bleach-blonde hair, causing the character to "blossom."

== Legacy and cultural impact ==
Thanks to her groundbreaking role as Buffy, Sarah Michelle Gellar, by the late 1990s, had become a household name, as well as one of Hollywood's "It Girls". In 1998, she appeared on Entertainment Weekly's Top 12 Entertainers of the Year and the "Most Beautiful" list by People magazine. In 1999, she signed on to be the face of Maybelline —becoming the company's first celebrity spokeswoman since Lynda Carter in the late 1970s— and was voted number one in FHM's "100 Sexiest Women" of the year. She was featured in the magazine's German, Dutch, South African, Danish and Romanian editions of the list since 1998. Topsocialite.com listed her as the 8th Sexiest woman of the 1990s.

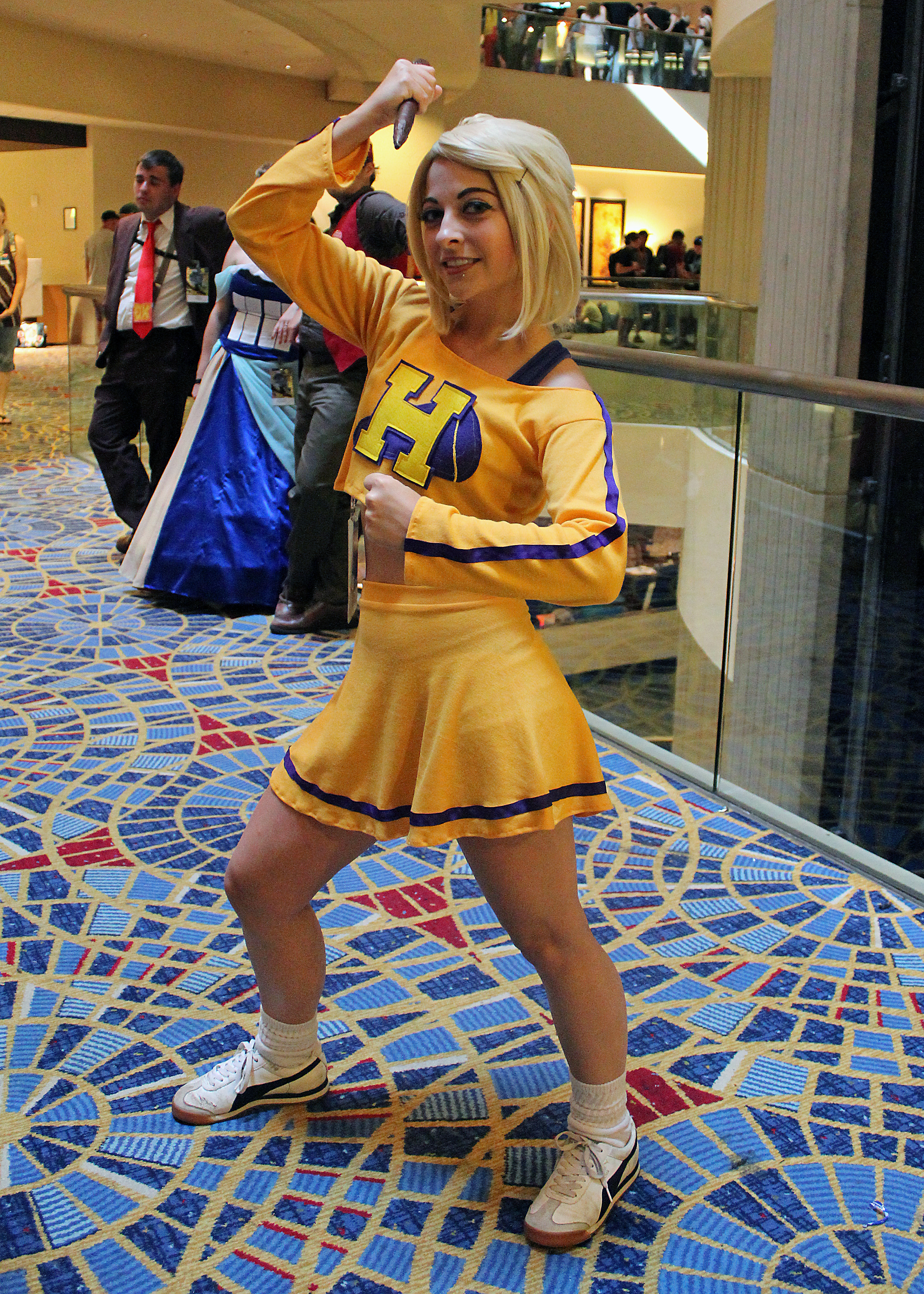
Fan cosplaying as Buffy Summers

The character of Buffy became a cultural icon, inspiring plenty of other female characters. Marie-Claire Chappet wrote, in an article for Harper's Bazaar, "Her witty comebacks, her high-kicks, her strength. Everything about her was mesmerising. I had seen female warriors before – in superhero cartoons or even Star Wars – but something about the way the show was otherwise grounded in a rather mundane high-school reality, made this startlingly affective," citing Buffy as a feminine icon. CBS News developed a theory called the "Buffy Effect", analyzing the impact of the character on strong woman on television. Lindsay Abrams wrote for The Atlantic, "The 'Buffy effect' posits that strong characters can combat the negative effects of sexual violence in media."

Buffy has been acclaimed by viewers and critics for being badass while still being "girly" and relatable. The Hollywood Reporter placed Buffy Summers at No.3 in "Hollywood's Favorite Female Characters"; the website Digital Spy put her at number one: "But Buffy Summers was the hero in her own story. And if she could be, then I could be too. Throughout its seven-season run, audiences grew along with Buffy and many of its most impactful moments can apply to all sorts of things that real life might throw at you – whatever your age, or your struggle." Vox stated that Buffy "subverts one of pop culture’s most famous tropes. … As comics and YA fans will be quick to attest, Buffy wasn’t pop culture’s first female superhero, not by a long shot. But she was the first to anchor her own TV series, and her success paved the way for others like her." X-Men: Evolution's producer/writer Boyd Kirkland admit that they replicated the dance scene from the episode "Bad Girls" for the episode 5 from season 1 of the show named "Speed and Spyke", letting know that "Buffy had become an influential figure in television in her own right -- even impacting the way characters like X-Men: Evolution's teenagers like Kitty Pryde were portrayed on screen." Julie Plec, co-creator of the show The Vampire Diaries, cited Buffy as an inspiration for the character of Damon Salvatore calling him "our Buffy".

Kadeen Griffiths of Bustle insists on how Gellar's Buffy Summers influenced quippy, strong female characters such as Veronica Mars from Veronica Mars, Rory Gilmore from Gilmore Girls, Elena Gilbert from The Vampire Diaries, Hope Mikaelson from The Originals and its spin-off Legacies etc. Kadeen Griffiths wrote : "And San Diego Comic-Con 2015 had an entire panel called 'The Buffy Effect: Teen Heroines Then and Now,' in which authors like Kiersten White (And I Darken) and Rae Carson (Walk The Earth a Stranger) cited the show as a key inspiration in how they wrote their female characters." Bob Schooley called Buffy Summers a huge influence on the creation of the character Kim Possible. Kristen Bell's work is often compared to Sarah Michelle Gellar's portrayal of the title character on the television series Buffy the Vampire Slayer, The Hollywood Reporter writing "arguably the television successor to Sarah Michelle Gellar's Buffy the Vampire Slayer when it comes to fighting bad guys." The Guardian wrote "Lately though, for teenage girls, we have had Twilight's mopey and passive Bella Swan. Buffy the Vampire Slayer is long gone, so to see Katniss (more akin to Neo in The Matrix) as resilient and smart and reluctantly becoming a symbol of a revolution is quite something," putting Katniss Everdeen as an descendant of the character Buffy.

Buffy's name became a synonym for strong women, as we can see in fiction when characters refer to women trying to fight or having a physical fight; for example, in Heroes episode "Strange Attractors" (2010), Becky tells Claire, "You don't have to go all 'Buffy' on us." The romance of the protagonist with the two vampires Angel and Spike redefined the supernatural romance, inspiring romances in Twilight, The Vampire Diaries, Teen Wolf, True Blood, etc.
