= Adam Busch =

American actor

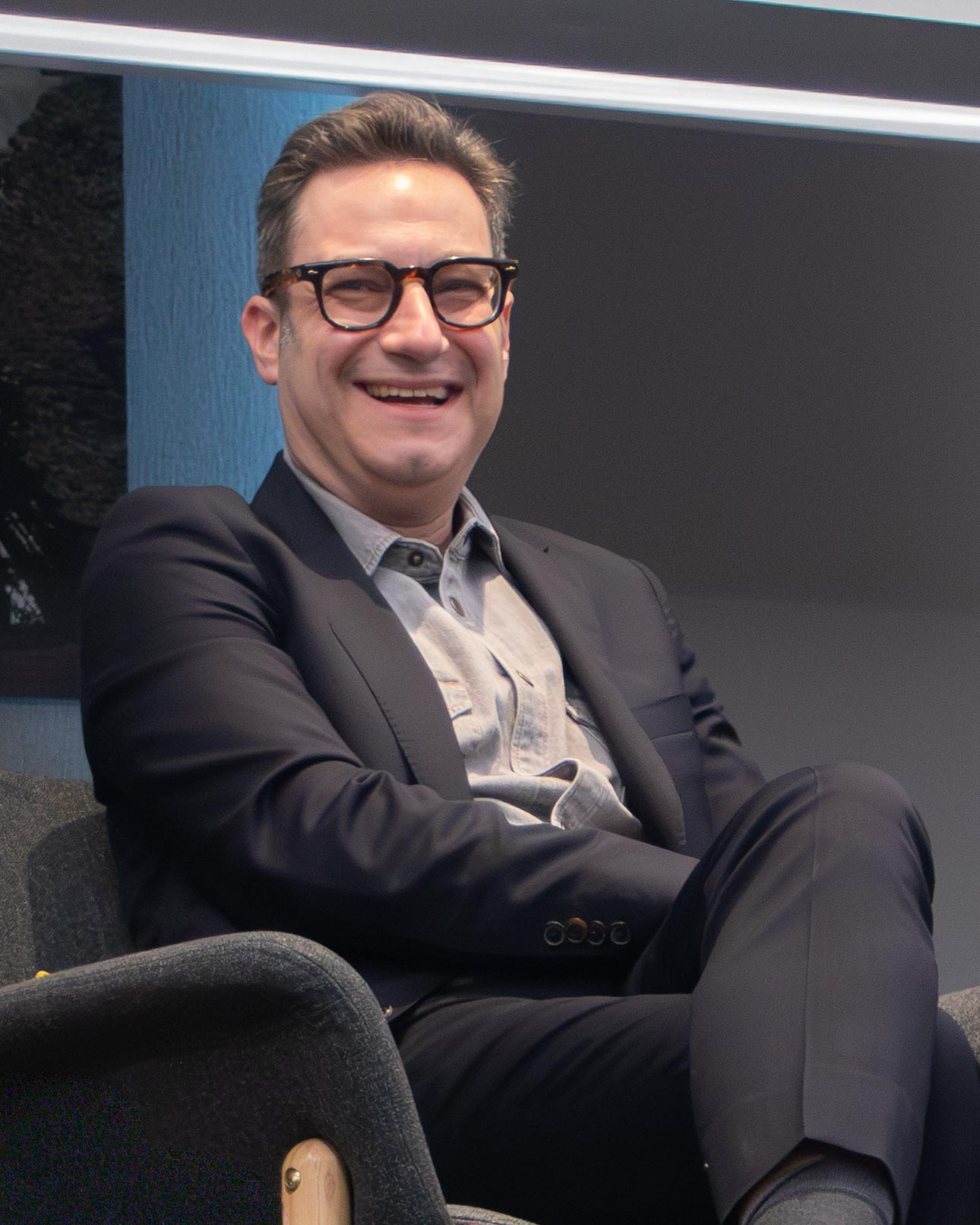
- Busch in 2024
- Born: East Meadow, New York, U.S.
- Occupation: Actor
- Years active: 1994–present

Adam Busch is an American actor best known for starring as Warren Mears on the television series Buffy the Vampire Slayer.

== Career ==
Busch was born in East Meadow, New York. He had his first film role in the movie Léon: The Professional. Early roles include Noah Allen from Nickelodeon's the Mystery Files of Shelby Woo, and an episode of Law & Order. He also had a small part as a nerdy AV geek in the bank-robbing cheerleader movie Sugar & Spice.

Busch appeared on Fox Network's brief series The Jury in Summer 2004, which ran for ten episodes, and has been seen in a character role on House. In 2006 he portrayed the Orthodox Jewish rap artist, Sholom Glickstein, in the Paul Weitz film, "American Dreamz". He had a recurring role in the Kelsey Grammer situation comedy, Back to You. He made a guest appearance on Terminator: The Sarah Connor Chronicles. He had a guest spot on Are You Scared 2. He is the singer in indie rock band Common Rotation. His dream role would be to portray former pop star Huey Lewis in a biopic. He played Neal in the TBS show Men at Work.

Busch is currently a cohost on the "Who Are These Podcasts?" podcast, appearing on the Wednesday shows.

== Personal life ==
In March 2009, Busch was dating Buffy co-star Amber Benson, who played Tara Maclay. The two have since broken up but have remained close friends.

Busch was raised Jewish.

== Filmography ==
Film
Year	Title	Role	Notes
1994	Léon: The Professional	Manolo	
2001	Magic Rock	Kyle	
2001	Sugar & Spice	Geeky guy	
2002	Book of Danny	Wrenstchler	
2006	American Dreamz	Sholem Glickstein	
2009	All American Orgy	Alan	
2010	Drones	Wendell (uncredited)	Co-director and producer Nominated – German Independence Award - Audience Award (shared w/Amber Benson)
2017	Dave Made a Maze	Gordon	
2017	Rebel in the Rye	Nigel Bench	
2022	Menorah in the Middle	Jacob	

Television
Year	Title	Role	Notes
1996–1997	The Mystery Files of Shelby Woo	Noah Allen	21 episodes
1998	Law & Order	Mark	Episode: "Expert"
2001	The Fugitive	Sean 'Fitz' Fitzgibbon	Episode: "Strapped"
2001–2003	Buffy the Vampire Slayer	Warren Mears	16 episodes (season 5-7, recurring)
2004	The Jury	Steve Dixon	10 episodes
2005	Point Pleasant	Wes	7 episodes
2006	House	Tony	Episode: "Sex Kills"
2008	Terminator: The Sarah Connor Chronicles	Charlie Fischer	Episode: "Complications"
2010	I'm in the Band	Shane Hackman	Episode: "Weasels vs. Robots"
2011	Grey's Anatomy	Fred Wilson	Episode: "Start Me Up"
2012–2014	Men at Work	Neal	Main cast
2013	CSI: Crime Scene Investigation	Max Dinello	Episode: "Dead of the Class"
2014	Major Crimes	Scott Ward	Episode: "Sweet Revenge"
2015	Empire	Chase One	2 episodes
2016	NCIS	Arthur Jankowski	Episode: "Home of the Brave"
2016–2017	Colony	Mr. Carson (credited as 'Teacher')	5 episodes
2017	Wisdom of the Crowd	Louis Hines	Episode: "Trade Secrets"
2018	Altered Carbon	Mickey	6 episodes
2019	Proven Innocent	Noah Weiss	4 episodes
2019	The Rookie	Mike Garvey	Episode: "Clean Cut"

Web
Year	Title	Role	Notes
2012–2014	MyMusic	Indie	Main cast
