= Tom Lenk =

American actor (born 1976)

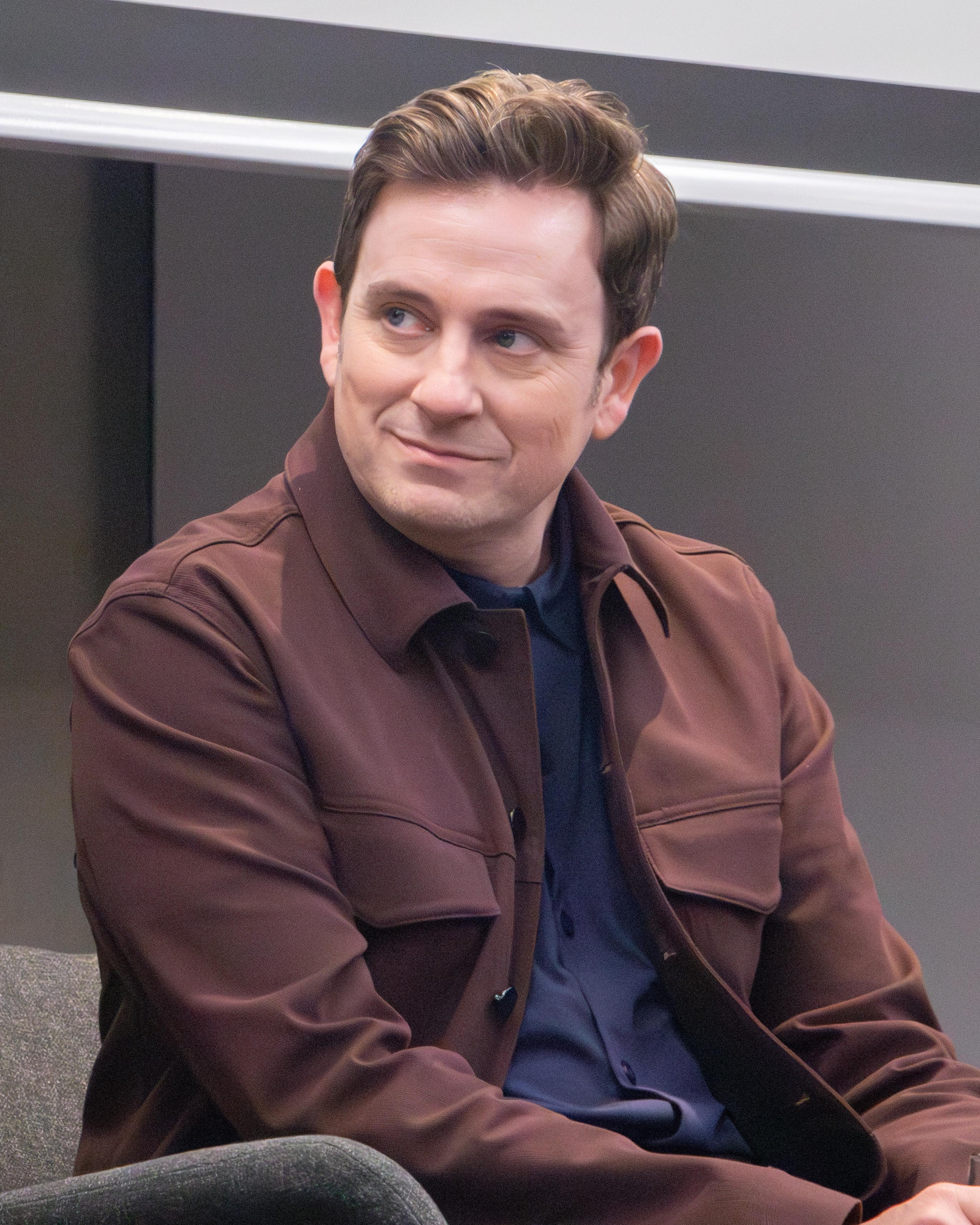
- Tom Lenk at Whispers from the Hellmouth Convention, April 2024 (Paris).
- Born: Thomas Loren Lenk; June 16, 1976 (age 50); Camarillo, California, U.S.
- Occupation: Actor
- Years active: 1997–present

Thomas Loren Lenk (born June 16, 1976) is an American film and television actor, best known for portraying the character of Andrew Wells in the television series Buffy the Vampire Slayer.

== Early life ==
Lenk was born in Camarillo, California, the son of Pamela Sherman, a teacher, and Fred Lenk, a tuba player, high school music teacher, and school district computer network administrator. He attended Adolfo Camarillo High School, and graduated from the University of California, Los Angeles, with a Bachelor of Arts.

== Career ==
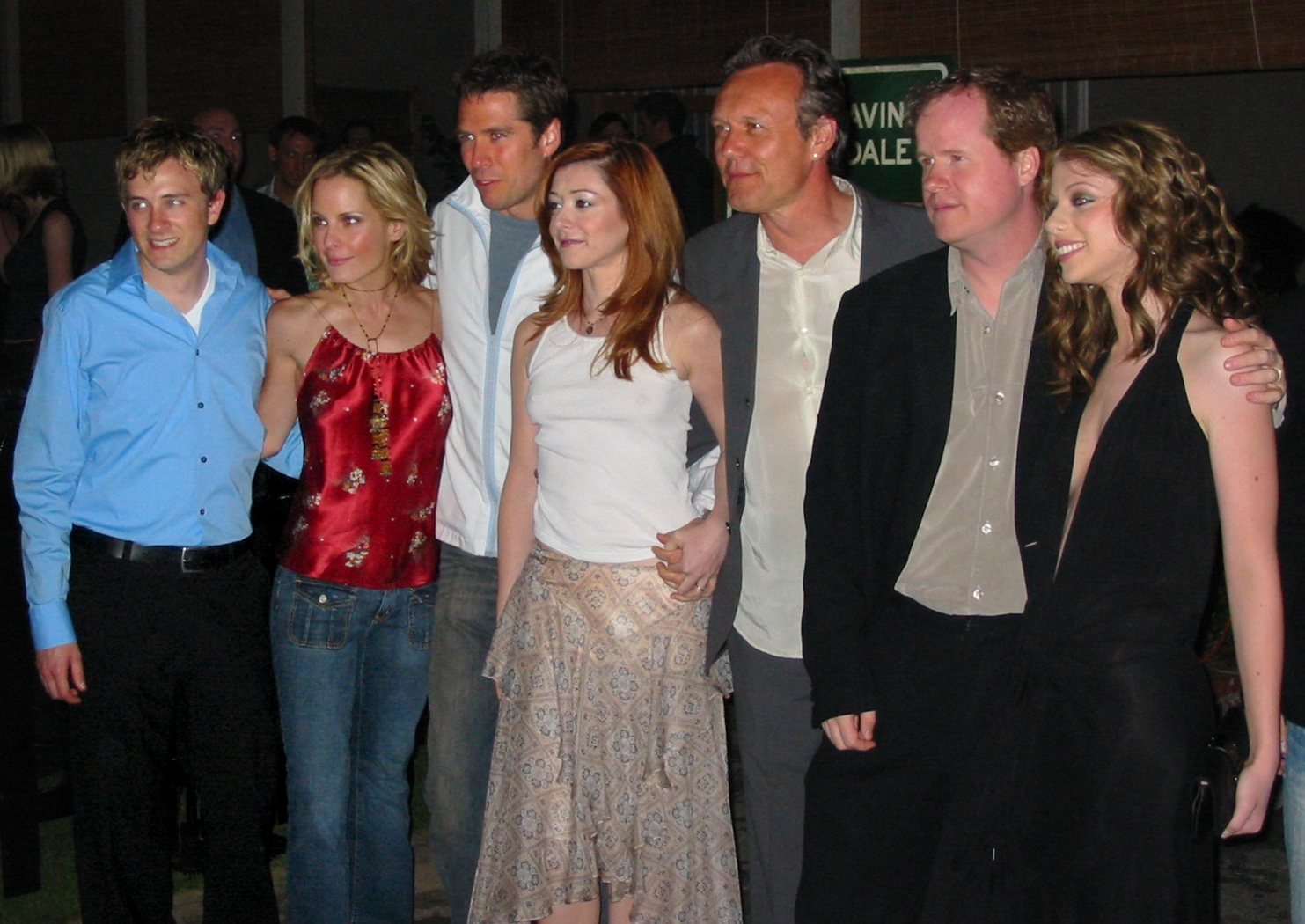
(From left to right) Lenk, Emma Caulfield, Alexis Denisof, Alyson Hannigan, Anthony Stewart Head, Joss Whedon, Michelle Trachtenberg at the Buffy cast party

After launching his career in 1997 with small parts in movies, Lenk won his breakthrough role in Buffy in 2000. He appeared in twenty-seven episodes of Joss Whedon's show altogether, and also played Andrew in two episodes of its spin off, Angel. Among the many television shows in which he appeared as a guest star were NBC's Joey, House, Six Feet Under, Eli Stone, How I Met Your Mother and Nip/Tuck. His film roles have included small parts in Date Movie, The Number 23, and Transformers. He also appeared in the web series Border Patrol, which premiered in June 2008 on Atom.com.

Besides acting, Lenk is a singer and playwright. He has toured with the European cast of Grease and has written three plays. He took over the role of Franz in the Broadway musical Rock of Ages as of September 14, 2009, having originated the role in the Las Vegas and Los Angeles productions in 2006. From 2009 to 2010, he posted video blogs on YouTube summing up his experiences on Broadway, usually under the title "Tom's Broadway Blogs". He also contributes video content to Felicia Day's YouTube channel, Geek and Sundry, and parodies fashion on Instagram.

Lenk appeared in an episode of Psych that poked fun at Buffy the Vampire Slayer; Kristy Swanson, who played Buffy in the movie that preceded the television show, took part in the episode as well. He also performed in the June 2012 edition of Don't Tell My Mother!, a monthly showcase in which authors, screenwriters, actors and comedians share embarrassing true stories.

In 2013, Lenk joined the Lifetime series Witches of East End as Hudson Rafferty. In 2016, he appeared in the third season finale of Transparent. In 2018 he starred in Tilda Swinton Answers an Ad on Craigslist which has played in LA, Edinburgh, and London.

== Personal life ==
Lenk is gay. Lenk hosts the Undressing Podcast with co-host Felicia Day.

== Filmography ==
=== Film ===
Year	Film	Role	Notes
1997	Boogie Nights	Uncle Floyd's Boy No. 2	
1999	Boy Next Door	Chris	
2000	And Then Came Summer	Drunk boy at party	
2004	Window Theory	Sean	
2004	Straight-Jacket	Teddy	
2004	Bandwagon	Tom Lenk	
2005	Loretta	Billy	Short film
2006	Date Movie	Frodo	
2006	The Thirst	Kronos	
2007	The Number 23	Bookstore Clerk	
2007	Equal Opportunity	Thomas the Tank Engine	
2007	Transformers	Analyst	
2007	Walking for the Stars: The Foley Artistry of Nancy Anne Cianci	Mike Rotch	Short film
2007	Boogeyman 2	Perry	
2010	My Girlfriend's Boyfriend	David Young	
2012	The Cabin in the Woods	Ronald The Intern	
2012	Much Ado About Nothing	Verges	
2012	Argo	Variety Reporter	
2014	Such Good People	Logan	
2021	Barb and Star Go to Vista Del Mar	Arnie	
2024	The Unreason	Alex	

=== Television ===
Year	Show	Role	Notes
2000	Judging Amy	Alan Higgins	Episode: "The God Thing"
2000–2003	Buffy the Vampire Slayer	Cyrus, Andrew Wells	Recurring, 27 episodes
2001	Popular	Chicken Delivery Guy	Episode: "The Brain Game"
2001	Ruling Class		Unsold TV pilot
2001	Cousin Skeeter		Episode: "Little Mr. Big Man on Campus"
2004	Mystery Girl		Unsold UPN TV pilot
2004	Angel	Andrew Wells	Episodes: "Damage", "The Girl in Question"
2004	Six Feet Under	Young Poet	Episode: "In Case of Rapture"
2004	Joey	Thomas	Episode "Joey and the Big Audition"
2005	House, M.D.	Allen	Episode: "Spin"
2006	How I Met Your Mother	Scott	Episode: "Swarley"
2007	Nurses	MRI Technician	FOX TV pilot
2008	G.I.L.F.	Tevor	Web series
2008	Eli Stone	WPK Assistant	Episode: "Heal the Pain"
2008	Samantha Who?	Coffee shop clerk	Episode: "The Girlfriend", "The Boss"
2008	Do Not Disturb	Victor	Episode: "Pilot"
2009	Trust Me	Anti Corporate Idealist	Episode: "Odd Man Out"
2009	Nip/Tuck	Corey	Episode: "Enigma"
2011	The Guild	Himself	Episode: "Social Traumas"
2011	Greek	Tour Guide Smith	Episode: "Legacy"
2011	Psych	Lucien	Episode: "This Episode Sucks"
2013–14	Witches of East End	Hudson Rafferty	Recurring role
2014	Episodes	Publicist	Episode: "Episode Five"
2015	Bones	Chris Winfelder	Episode: "The Carpals in the Coy-Wolves"
2016	Transparent	Trevor	Episode: "Exciting and New"
2016	Good Girls Revolt	Malcolm	Episode: "The Year-Ender"
2016	Princess Rap Battle	Flynn	Episode: "Rapunzel & Flynn vs. Anna & Kristoff"
2017	Fresh Off the Boat	Roger	Episode: "Pie vs. Cake"
2017	Hyperlinked	Wardrobe Stylist	Episode: "The Interview"
2018	Another Period	Husband	Episode: "Sex Nickelodeon"
2018	Workin' Moms	Demitre	Episode: "Cuck"
2018	American Housewife	Marshall Granville	Episode: "Mom Guilt"
2018	Room 104	Matty	Episode: "FOMO"
2019	Bajillion Dollar Propertie$	Brandoon	Episode: "Good Todd Hunting"
2019	EastSiders	Collin	4 episodes
2020	NCIS: New Orleans	Kevin McCable	Episode: "Predators"
2021	American Horror Stories	Tim Williams	Episode: "Game Over"
2021	Batwoman	Charlie Clark	Episode: "Antifreeze"
2021	NCIS: Hawai'i	Carter Dunlap	Episode: "Nightwatch"
2022	Dead End: Paranormal Park	Rancibalafloss El Hoxtrot "Hox"	

=== Stage ===
Year	Play	Role	Theater	Notes
2009	Rock of Ages	Franz	Brooks Atkinson Theatre	Replaced Wesley Taylor
2017	Tilda Swinton Answers an Ad on Craigslist	Tilda Swinton	Celebration Theatre	
