= Needham, Massachusetts =

Town in Massachusetts, United States

- Town
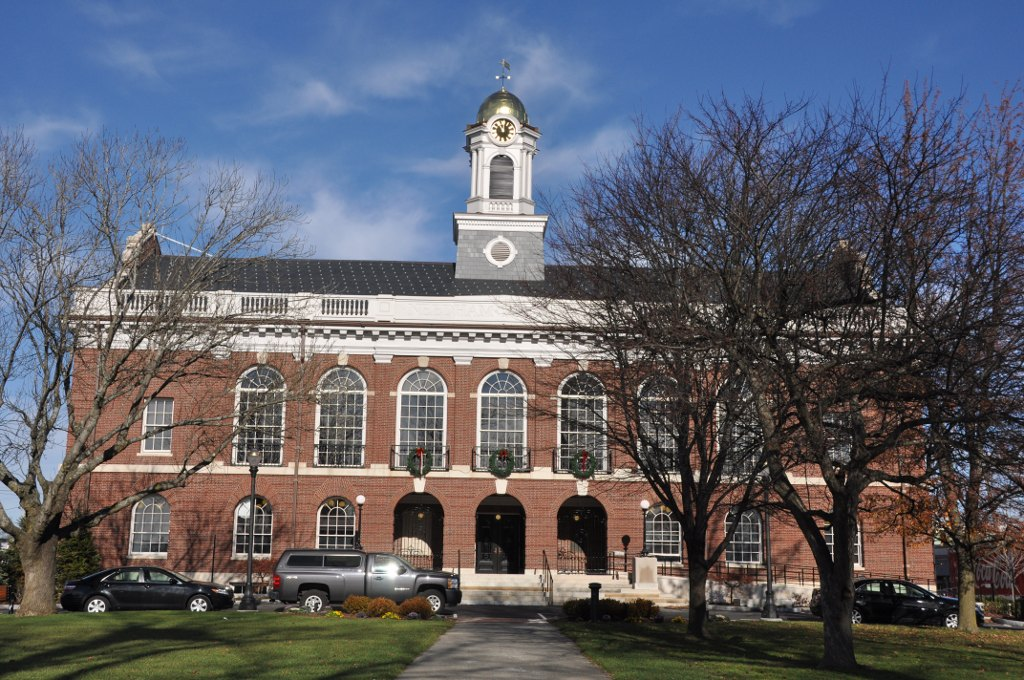
- Town Hall

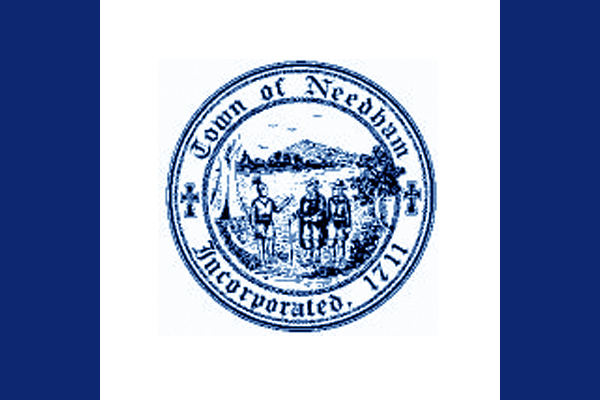
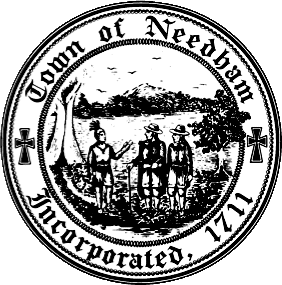
- Flag Seal

- Location in Norfolk County in Massachusetts

- Location within Greater Boston area Location within Massachusetts Location within the United States
- Coordinates: 42°17′00″N 71°14′00″W
- Country: United States
- State: Massachusetts
- County: Norfolk
- Settled: 1680
- Incorporated: 1711
- Named for: Needham Market

Government
  - Town Manager: Katie King

Area
  - Total: 12.7 sq mi (32.9 km^{2})
  - Land: 12.6 sq mi (32.7 km^{2})
  - Water: 0.077 sq mi (0.2 km^{2})
- Elevation: 161 ft (49 m)

Population (2020)
  - Total: 32,091
  - Density: 2,542/sq mi (981.4/km^{2})
- Time zone: UTC−5 (Eastern)
  - Summer (DST): UTC−4 (Eastern)
- ZIP Codes: 02492 (Needham); 02494 (Needham Heights)
- Area code: 781
- FIPS code: 25-44105
- GNIS feature ID: 0618325
- Website: needhamma.gov

Needham (/ˈniːdəm/ NEED-əm) is a town in Norfolk County, Massachusetts, United States. A suburb of Boston, its population was 32,091 in the 2020 U.S. Census. It is the home of Olin College of Engineering. It is also home to four commuter rail stations along the Needham Line.

== History ==
=== Early settlement ===
Needham was first settled in 1680 with the purchase of a tract of land measuring 4 miles (6.4 km) by 5 miles (8.0 km) from Chief Nehoiden for the sum of 10 pounds, 40 acres (160,000 m^{2}) of land, and 40 shillings worth of corn. It was officially incorporated in 1711. Originally part of the North Parish of Dedham, Needham split from Dedham and was named after the town of Needham Market in Suffolk, England.

Just 15 months after asking for their own church, 40 men living on the north side of the Charles River suddenly asked the General Court to separate them from Dedham. Their petition cited the inadequate services provided, namely schools and churches. They also said that, if they were simply to be made a precinct instead of a separate town, that they would suffer political reprisals.

Dedham agreed that the services were inadequate and did not oppose the separation, but did try to reduce the amount of land the separatists were seeking. Dedham also asked for a delay of one year. The General Court agreed with the petitioners, however, and created the new town of Needham with the original boundaries requested.

Those who remained in Dedham still held rights to the unallotted lands in Needham, however, and any decrease in taxes would be offset by a decrease in expenditures. There may have also been some satisfaction in separating themselves from those on the other side of the 1704 power struggle.

By the 1770s settlers in the western part of the town who had to travel a long distance to the meeting house on what is now Central Avenue sought to form a second parish in the town. Opposition to this desire created conflict, and in 1774 a mysterious fire destroyed the existent meeting house. Some time afterwards the West Parish was formed.

=== Growth and industry ===
In 1857, the City of Boston began a project to fill in the Back Bay with landfill by filling the tidewater flats of the Charles River. The fill to reclaim the bay from the water was obtained from Needham, Massachusetts from the area of present-day Route 128. The firm of Goss and Munson, railroad contractors, built 6 miles (9.7 km) of railroad from Needham and their 35-car trains made 16 trips a day to Back Bay. The filling of present-day Back Bay was completed by 1882; filling reached Kenmore Square in 1890, and finished in the Fens in 1900. The project was the largest of a number of land reclamation projects, beginning in 1820, which, over the course of time, more than doubled the size of the original Boston peninsula.

In 1865, William Carter established a knitting mill company in Needham Heights that would eventually become a major manufacturer and leading brand of children's apparel in the United States. The site of Mill #1 currently houses the Avery Manor assisted living center, while Mill #2 stood along the shores of Rosemary Lake. By the 1960s, the company owned seven mills in Massachusetts and the south. The Carter family sold the business in 1990, after which Carter's, Inc. moved its headquarters to Atlanta, Georgia.

In the late 1860s William Emerson Baker moved to Needham. A notably wealthy man due to his having improved the mechanical sewing machine, Baker assembled a parcel of land exceeding 800 acres (3.2 km^{2}) and named it Ridge Hill Farm. He built two man made lakes on his property, including Sabrina lake near present-day Locust Lane. Baker turned part of his property into an amusement park with exotic animals, tunnels, trick floors and mirrors. In 1888 he built a sizable hotel, near the intersection of present-day Whitman Road and Charles River Street, called the Hotel Wellesley which had a capacity of over 300 guests. The hotel burned to the ground on December 19, 1891.

In 1891, George Walker, Boston owner of a lithograph company, and Gustavos Gordon, scientist, formed Walker-Gordon Laboratories to develop processes for the prevention of contamination of milk and to answer the call by enlightened physicians for better babies' milk formulas. This plant was located in the Charles River Village section of Needham with another large facility in New Jersey. The scientific dairy production facilities of the Walker-Gordon Dairy Farm were widely advertised and utilized modern advancements in the handling of milk products.

=== Incorporation of Wellesley ===
In 1881, the West Parish was separately incorporated as the town of Wellesley. The following year, Needham and Wellesley high schools began playing an annual football game on Thanksgiving, now the second-longest running high school football rivalry in the United States (and longest such contest on Thanksgiving). Also the longest running public high school rivalry. In 2024, Needham defeated Wellesley 20–13, which leaves the series' all-time record at 66–62–9, Wellesley leading. This 2024 win capped off their undefeated season, which ultimately ended with a loss in the Division 1 Super Bowl.

With the loss of the West Parish to Wellesley, the town lost its town hall and plans to build a new one began in 1902 with the selection of a building committee. The cornerstone was laid by the Grand Lodge of Masons on September 2, 1902, and the building was dedicated on December 22, 1903. The total cost for the hall was $57,500 including furnishings. Because it was located on the town common, the cost did not include land as none was purchased. In 2011, the town hall was extensively refurbished and expanded. In the process, the second-floor meeting hall was restored to its original function and beauty.

=== Recent history ===
Needham's population grew by over 50 percent during the 1930s.

In 2005, Needham became the first jurisdiction in the world to raise the age to legally buy tobacco products to 21.

== Geography ==
According to the United States Census Bureau, the town has a total area of 12.7 square miles (32.9 km^{2}), of which 12.6 square miles (32.7 km^{2}) is land and 0.1 square mile (0.2 km^{2}) is water.

Needham's area is roughly in the shape of an acute, northward-pointing triangle. The Charles River forms nearly all of the southern and northeastern boundaries, the town line with Wellesley forming the third, northwestern one. In addition to Wellesley on the northwest, Needham borders Newton and the West Roxbury section of Boston on the northeast, and Dover, Westwood, and Dedham on the south. The majority of Cutler Park is in Needham and is located along the Charles River and the border with Newton and West Roxbury. Elevations in Needham range from 85 feet above sea level at Rosemary Meadows to 180 feet at Needham Square and 300 feet at Bird's Hill.

=== Climate ===
Needham has a warm-summer humid continental climate (Dfb under the Köppen climate classification system), with high humidity and precipitation year-round.

Climate data for Needham, Massachusetts
| Month | Jan | Feb | Mar | Apr | May | Jun | Jul | Aug | Sep | Oct | Nov | Dec | Year |
|---|---|---|---|---|---|---|---|---|---|---|---|---|---|
| Record high °F (°C) | 66 (19) | 67 (19) | 74 (23) | 82 (28) | 91 (33) | 95 (35) | 100 (38) | 97 (36) | 97 (36) | 87 (31) | 77 (25) | 66 (19) | 100 (38) |
| Mean daily maximum °F (°C) | 33.6 (0.9) | 34.7 (1.5) | 43.4 (6.3) | 54.9 (12.7) | 66.4 (19.1) | 74.7 (23.7) | 80 (27) | 78 (26) | 70.9 (21.6) | 60.5 (15.8) | 48.9 (9.4) | 37.4 (3.0) | 57.0 (13.9) |
| Daily mean °F (°C) | 26 (−3) | 26 (−3) | 33 (1) | 42 (6) | 53 (12) | 62 (17) | 68 (20) | 66 (19) | 60 (16) | 50 (10) | 39 (4) | 30 (−1) | 46 (8) |
| Mean daily minimum °F (°C) | 18.3 (−7.6) | 18.8 (−7.3) | 27 (−3) | 36.5 (2.5) | 46.4 (8.0) | 55.4 (13.0) | 61.5 (16.4) | 60.3 (15.7) | 53.4 (11.9) | 43.4 (6.3) | 33.7 (0.9) | 22.8 (−5.1) | 39.8 (4.3) |
| Record low °F (°C) | −14 (−26) | −21 (−29) | −5 (−21) | 6 (−14) | 27 (−3) | 31 (−1) | 44 (7) | 32 (0) | 28 (−2) | 20 (−7) | 5 (−15) | −19 (−28) | −21 (−29) |
| Average precipitation inches (mm) | 4.2 (110) | 3.9 (99) | 4.6 (120) | 4.1 (100) | 3.7 (94) | 3.6 (91) | 3.7 (94) | 4.1 (100) | 4 (100) | 4 (100) | 4.4 (110) | 4.4 (110) | 48.7 (1,228) |
| Average snowfall inches (cm) | 16.1 (41) | 16 (41) | 12 (30) | 3.1 (7.9) | 0.1 (0.25) | 0 (0) | 0 (0) | 0 (0) | 0 (0) | 0.3 (0.76) | 2.7 (6.9) | 11.7 (30) | 62 (157.81) |
| Average precipitation days | 12 | 11 | 13 | 12 | 12 | 12 | 11 | 10 | 9 | 10 | 11 | 12 | 135 |
Source 1: Climate Summary for Dedham, Massachusetts
Source 2: Monthly- All Data for Dedham, Massachusetts

== Demographics ==
Historical population
| Year | Pop. | ±% |
|---|---|---|
| 1790 | 1,130 | — |
| 1850 | 1,944 | +72.0% |
| 1860 | 2,658 | +36.7% |
| 1870 | 3,607 | +35.7% |
| 1880 | 5,252 | +45.6% |
| 1890 | 3,035 | −42.2% |
| 1900 | 4,016 | +32.3% |
| 1910 | 5,026 | +25.1% |
| 1920 | 7,012 | +39.5% |
| 1930 | 10,845 | +54.7% |
| 1940 | 12,445 | +14.8% |
| 1950 | 16,313 | +31.1% |
| 1960 | 25,793 | +58.1% |
| 1970 | 29,748 | +15.3% |
| 1980 | 27,901 | −6.2% |
| 1990 | 27,557 | −1.2% |
| 2000 | 28,911 | +4.9% |
| 2010 | 28,886 | −0.1% |
| 2020 | 32,091 | +11.1% |
| 2024* | 32,931 | +2.6% |
* = population estimate. Source: United States census records and Population Estimates Program data.

As of the 2020 census, there were 32,091 people, 10,801 households, and 8,480 families residing in the town. The population density was 2,546.9 inhabitants per square mile (983.4/km^{2}). The racial makeup of the town was 82.6% White, 2.9% Black or African American, 0.1% Native American, 8.9% Asian, 0.5% from other races, and 2.4% from two or more races. Hispanic or Latino of any race were 3.2% of the population.

There were 10,801 households, out of which 26.9% had children under the age of 18 living with them, 66.1% were married couples living together, 5.2% had a female householder with no husband present and 21.5% were non-families. Of all households 23.4% were made up of individuals, and 13.9% had someone living alone who was 65 years of age or older. The average household size was 2.63 and the average family size was 3.23.

In the town, the population was laid out with 26.2% under the age of 18, 5.3% from 18 to 24, 25.8% from 25 to 44, 24.7% from 45 to 64, and 18.0% who were 65 years of age or older. The median age was 43 years. For every 100 females, there were 92.2 males. For every 100 females age 18 and over, there were 87.3 males.

According to a 2007 estimate, the median income for a household in the town was $116,867, and the median income for a family was $144,042. Males had a median income of $76,459 versus $47,092 for females. The per capita income for the town was $56,776. About 1.6% of families and 2.5% of the population were below the poverty line, including 1.2% of those under age 18 and 4.2% of those age 65 or over.

== Government ==
Needham uses the old style town government, with a representative town meeting. Also, the populace of Needham elects a Select Board, which is essentially the executive branch of the town government. The town is part of the Massachusetts Senate's Norfolk, Bristol and Middlesex district.

== Economy ==
Needham is primarily a bedroom community and commuter suburban district located outside of Boston.

The northern side of town beyond the I-95/Route 128 beltway, however, was developed for light industry shortly after World War II. Many restaurants and food companies are based in Needham. More recently, Needham has begun to attract high technology and internet firms, such as PTC and TripAdvisor, to this part of town.

== Education ==
The Town of Needham operates one high school, Needham High School, which underwent a $62-million renovation that was completed in 2009; two middle schools: William F. Pollard Middle School, for seventh and eighth grade, and High Rock School, for sixth grade only; and five elementary schools for grades K–5: John Eliot Elementary School, Sunita L. Williams Elementary School, William Mitchell Elementary School, Newman Elementary School, and Broadmeadow Elementary School. Needham recently finished building the newest elementary school, Sunita L. Williams Elementary School, to replace the aging Hillside Elementary School. The newest school opened in the fall of 2019.

Needham is also home to Catholic schools such as St. Joseph School, which supports co-education for students from preschool to 8th grade, and St. Sebastian's School, a Catholic school for boys in grades 7–12. St. Sebastian's is part of the rigorous Independent School League.

Franklin W. Olin College of Engineering is also located in Needham.

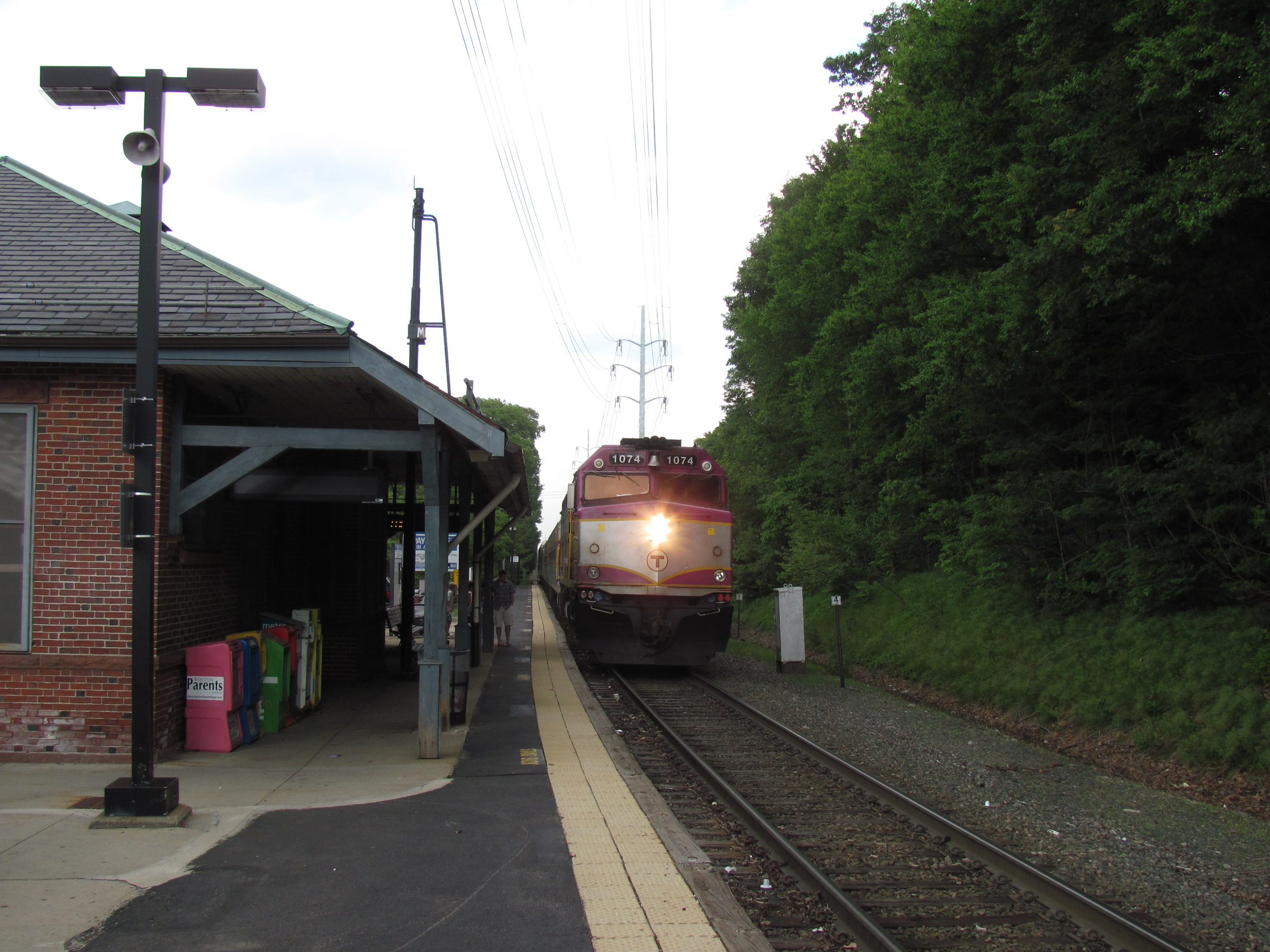
Needham Junction MBTA Station

== Transportation ==
The I-95/Route 128 circumferential highway that circles Boston passes through Needham, with three exits providing access to the town. Massachusetts Route 135 also passes through the town.

Commuter rail service from Boston's South Station is provided by the MBTA with four stops in Needham on its Needham Line: Needham Heights, Needham Center, Needham Junction and Hersey.

== Media ==
Needham is part of the Greater Boston media market and acts as an antenna farm that houses many of the transmitters for local media.

In addition to The Boston Globe (and its Your Town Needham website) and Boston Herald newspapers, there are two local weekly newspapers, the Needham Times (published by Gatehouse Media, Inc.) and Needham Hometown Weekly (published by Hometown Publications, LLC), and a website owned by AOL called Needham Patch.

The studios of television stations WCVB-TV (5 Boston, ABC), WBTS-CD (15 Nashua, New Hampshire, NBC), WUTF-TV (27 Worcester, UniMás), WNEU (60 Merrimack, New Hampshire, Telemundo), and WUNI (66 Marlborough, Univision) are located in Needham, as are the transmitters of WCVB-TV, WBZ-TV (4 Boston, CBS), WGBH-TV (2 Boston, PBS), WGBX-TV (44 Boston, PBS), WBTS-CD (15 Nashua, New Hampshire, NBC), WFXT (25 Boston, Fox), WSBK-TV (38 Boston, MyNetworkTV), WUTF-TV, WNEU (60 Merrimack, New Hampshire, Telemundo), and WFXZ-CD (24 Boston, Biz TV). The television towers are also the sites of FM radio stations WBUR-FM, WKLB-FM, and several backup facilities for other stations. NBC also opened up 160,000 square foot studio facility and operations center in Needham, in 2020. In addition to the stations listed above, the facility is also home to New England Cable News and NBC Sports Boston.

The Needham Channel provides public-access television to cable TV subscribers in Needham. Public, educational, and government access programming is produced and delivered through three channels—a community channel, a municipal channel and an educational channel. The three channels are available on the channel lineups of each of the three franchised cable TV providers provided—Comcast, RCN, and Verizon. Selected content is also available for streaming through The Needham Channel's web site.

Programming on The Needham Channel includes:

- Municipal meetings – Board of Selectmen, School Committee, Zoning Board of Appeals, Town Meeting
- News, Public Affairs and Education – The Needham Channel News (a weekly live local news program), Needham Schools Spotlight
- Sports – High school sporting events
- Locally produced programs – Inside Talk, Clelia's Cucina Italiana, The Language of Business, What's My House Worth, services from Needham houses of worship
- Programs from other Public Access Stations
- Community Bulletin Board

Boston radio station WEEI (850 AM) transmits from a three-tower site south of the town recycling transfer station. Needham has two radio station studio locations, that of Concord-licensed WBNW (1120 AM) located at 144 Gould Street, and Cambridge licensed WNTN (1550 AM) located at 31 Fremont Street, across I-95 from WCVB-TV.

Needham High School also releases several forms of media to its students and members of the town, including its student newspaper The Hilltopper, the student news video broadcast NHSN, and "NHS News from the Hill", which is released by members of the administration.

== Notable people ==
=== Academics ===
- Ananda Coomaraswamy, art historian, philosopher, and Indologist
- Nelson Goodman, philosopher
- Thomas Huckle Weller, a Nobel Prize-winning virologist
- Franklin Stahl, professor of biology, famous for Meselson-Stahl experiment
- Sam Bass Warner Jr., U.S. urban historian

=== Actors ===
- Edwin McDonough, actor
- Harold Russell, actor
- Sarah Saltzberg, actress/singer and star of Broadway's The 25th Annual Putnam County Spelling Bee
- Arnold Stang, actor
- Tom Virtue, actor
- William Converse-Roberts, actor

=== Artists ===
- Alvan Fisher, landscape artist
- Edmund H. Garrett, prolific 19th- and 20th-century book illustrator
- Pietro Pezzati, portrait artist
- Michael John Straub, artist
- Walter E. Ware, architect
- N.C. Wyeth, artist

=== Business ===
- John Akers, CEO/chairman of IBM
- Keith Barr, CEO of CarMax
- Jeff Taylor, founder of Monster.com

=== Music ===
- Niia Bertino, Columbia recording artist featured on Wyclef Jean's "Sweetest Girl" single
- John Boecklin, drummer/guitarist/songwriter for the metal band DevilDriver
- Robert Freeman, pianist, musicologist, and longtime director of the Eastman School of Music
- Mia Matsumiya, violinist of the avant-rock band Kayo Dot
- Joey McIntyre, singer-songwriter and actor
- Marissa Nadler, singer
- Tiger Okoshi, jazz trumpet player
- Richard Patrick, founder of industrial band Filter and former member of Nine Inch Nails

=== Politics ===
- Charlie Baker, former governor of Massachusetts and President of the NCAA
- Gary L. Daniels, member of the New Hampshire General Court
- Peter DeFazio, former United States congressman from Oregon
- Cheryl Jacques, first openly-lesbian member of the Massachusetts Senate and later president of the Human Rights Campaign
- Phil Murphy, governor of New Jersey

=== Sports ===
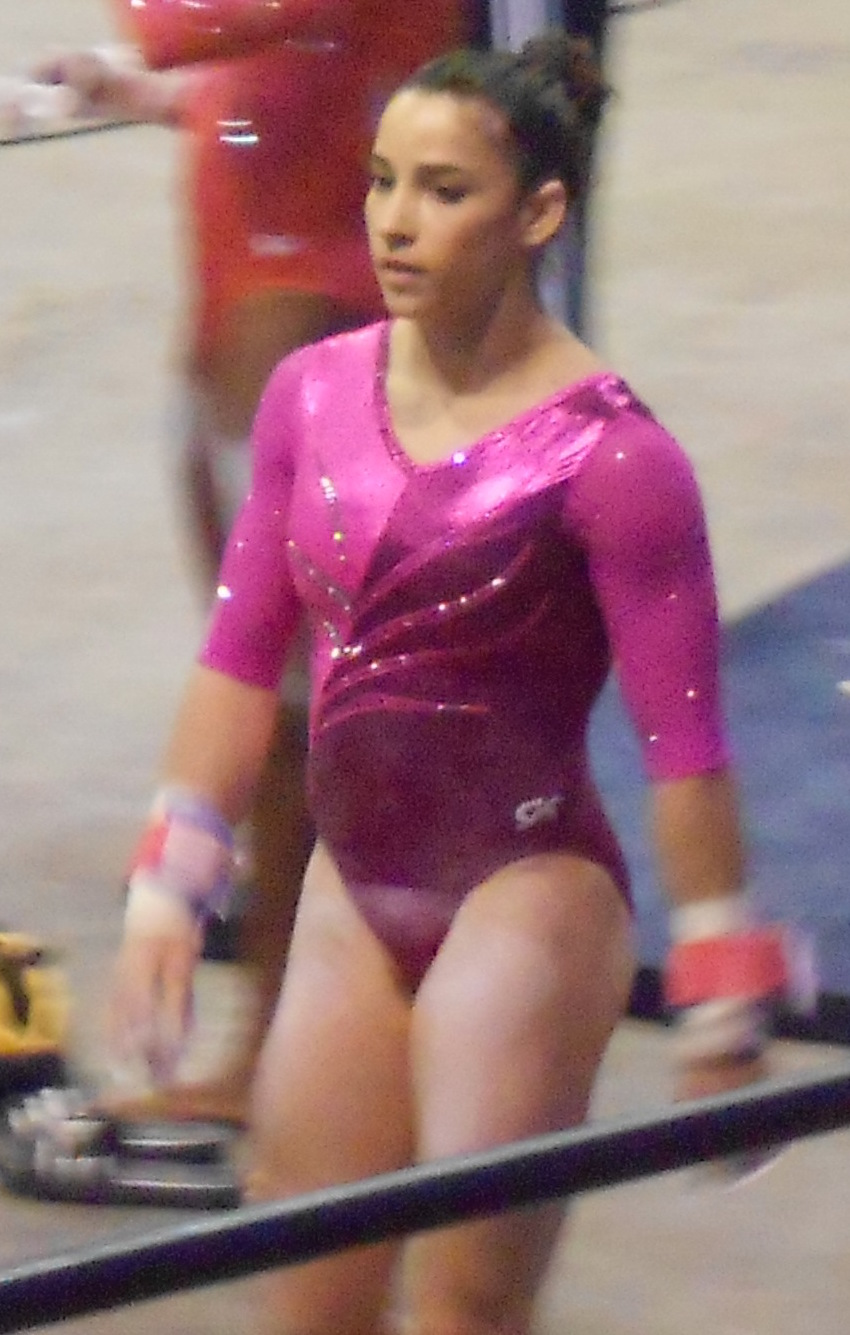
Aly Raisman

- Edward T. Barry, ice hockey player and coach
- Dave Cadigan, offensive lineman in the NFL
- Mike Condon, goaltender in the NHL, was born in Needham
- Mario 'Mike' DeFazio, Needham High wrestling coach 1934–1966, member of National Wrestling Hall of Fame
- Robbie Ftorek, NHL coach and star player in both the NHL and WHA
- Vic Gatto, captain, 1968 "Harvard Wins, 29-29" Harvard football team, college football head coach
- Pete Gaudet (born 1942), college basketball coach
- Mike Grier, retired player of the NHL
- Noah Hanifin, defenseman with the Calgary Flames and NHL All-Star
- Steven Hauschka, Buffalo Bills kicker
- Eric Johnson, New Orleans Saints tight end
- Mike Lalor, former defenseman and Stanley Cup winner with the Montreal Canadiens
- Kristine Lilly, former US women's soccer player
- Frank Malzone, former third baseman for the Boston Red Sox
- Rachel Mayer, US Olympic figure skater
- Mike Milbury, sportscaster and former member of the Boston Bruins
- Tom O'Regan, former forward for the Boston University Terriers and the Pittsburgh Penguins
- Aly Raisman, US women's artistic gymnast and six-time Olympic medalist
- Karl Ravech, ESPN Baseball Tonight anchor
- Derek Sanderson, former Boston Bruins player
- Cam Schlittler, baseball pitcher for the New York Yankees and son of chief of police for Needham
- Milt Schmidt, ice hockey player and manager for the Boston Bruins
- Paul Silas, former Boston Celtics player, three time NBA championship team member, NBA head coach
- Mac Steeves (born 1994), soccer player
- Harry Swartz (born 1996), soccer player

=== Television ===
- Marsha Bemko, executive producer of Antiques Roadshow
- Lee Eisenberg, writer for The Office
- Steve Hely, writer of American Dad!
- Allison Jones, who cast The Office and The Good Place
- Ben Karlin, executive producer of The Daily Show with Jon Stewart and The Colbert Report
- Scott Rosenberg, screenwriter

=== Literature ===
- Janet Tashjian, the author of The Gospel According to Larry and the My Life as a Book series

=== Other ===
- Khassan Baiev, a Chechen surgeon who treated Russian soldiers and Chechen rebels, most notably Shamil Basayev and Salman Raduyev
- Jared Freid, comedian
- James S. Gracey, commandant of the Coast Guard
- Fatemeh Haghighatjoo, a reformist member of the Iranian Parliament who teaches women's studies at the University of Massachusetts Boston
- Jen Kirkman, stand-up comedian, television writer, and actress
- Chester Nimitz, Jr., a retired United States Navy rear admiral and World War II submarine hero
- Sunita Williams, NASA astronaut
- William G. Young, United States District Court for the District of Massachusetts judge

== See also ==
- Beth Israel Deaconess Hospital – Needham

== Works cited ==
- Lockridge, Kenneth (1985). A New England Town. New York: W. W. Norton & Company. ISBN 978-0-393-95459-3.
- Hanson, Robert Brand (1976). Dedham, Massachusetts, 1635-1890. Dedham Historical Society.
