= True Confessions =

True Confessions may refer to:

- True Confessions (album), 1986, by Bananarama
- True Confessions (magazine)
  - True Confessions, a 1985 anthology television series inspired by the magazine, produced by Alan Landsburg
- True Confessions (novel), 1977, by John Gregory Dunne
  - True Confessions (film), 1981, based on the novel
- Tru Confessions, a 2002 Disney Channel film
- "True Confessions", a 1979 song by The Undertones from their eponymous debut album
- "True Confessions", a 1997 song by the Iron Sheiks (Tragedy Khadafi and Imam T.H.U.G.)
- True Confessions, a 2002 romance novel by Rachel Gibson
- Tru Confessions (novel), a novel by Janet Tashjian
- "True Confessions" (Falcon Crest), a 1989 television episode
- "True Confessions" (A Touch of Frost), a 1997 television episode
