= Paul Yost =

Paul Yost may refer to:

- Paul Edward Yost (1919–2007), American inventor and balloonist
- Paul A. Yost Jr. (1929–2022), U.S. Coast Guard admiral
