= James S. Gracey =

United States Coast Guard admiral (1927–2020)

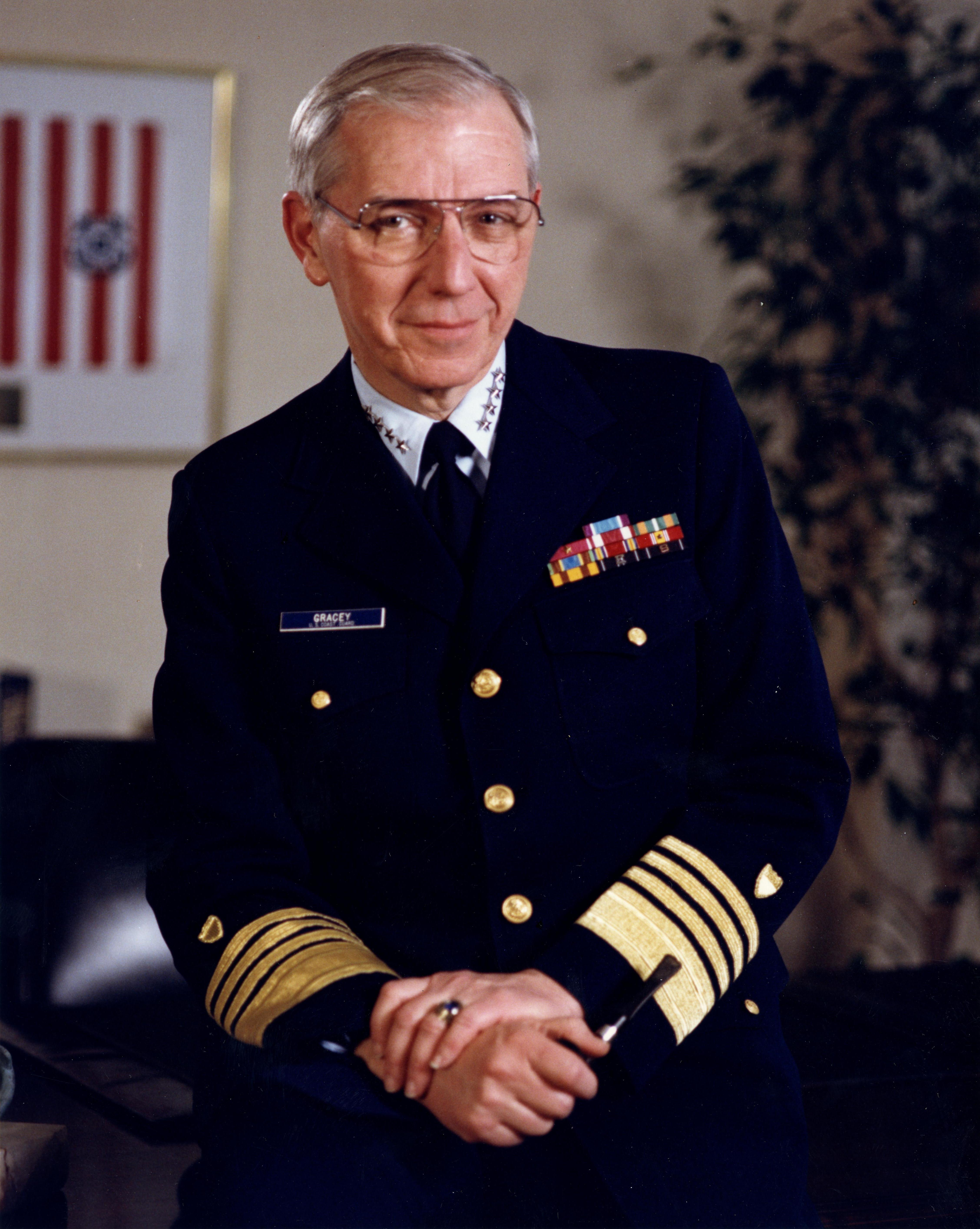
- Born: James Steele Gracey; August 24, 1927; Newton, Massachusetts, U.S.
- Died: April 5, 2020 (aged 92) Falls Church, Virginia, U.S.
- Branch: United States Coast Guard
- Service years: 1945–1986
- Rank: Admiral
- Commands: Commandant of the Coast Guard; Coast Guard Pacific Area; Ninth Coast Guard District; USCGC Mariposa

James Steele Gracey (August 24, 1927 – April 5, 2020) was an admiral of the United States Coast Guard who served as the 17th commandant from 1982 to 1986.

== Early life and education ==
Gracey was born in Newton, Massachusetts and was the son of Ernest J. Gracey and Edna S. Gracey. Following graduation from Needham High School in Needham, Massachusetts, he accepted an appointment to the United States Coast Guard Academy in New London, Connecticut. While a cadet at the Academy, he served as battalion commander and captain of the baseball team. He was also a member of the soccer and rifle teams.

== Coast Guard career ==
Following graduation in June 1949, he agreed to remain at the Academy until the following September as a tactical instructor. From 1951 to 1953, he was stationed at the Captain of the Port Office in Boston, Massachusetts. Between March and May 1953 he attended the LORAN Indoctrination School at Coast Guard Training Station, Groton, Connecticut. After completing the course he commanded the LORAN station, Ocean Cape, Yakutat, Alaska, for one year. He then returned to the Academy for a brief assignment as assistant tactics officer and baseball coach from June to September 1954. He entered the Graduate School of Business Administration at Harvard University in 1954, receiving a master of business administration in June 1956. As part of his work at Harvard, he spent the summer of 1955 in industry training at Norton Company in Worcester, Massachusetts. From July 1956 to July 1960, he served at Coast Guard Headquarters, Washington, DC, as a branch chief in the supply division. During the following two years he commanded the buoy tender USCGC Mariposa out of New London, Connecticut. The ship serviced aids to navigation along the seacoast of Connecticut and Long Island and broke ice on the Hudson River From September 1962 to April 1965, he served as Comptroller, of the St. Louis-based Second Coast Guard District with collateral duties that included cadet procurement in Kansas and Missouri. He then transferred to the Third Coast Guard District staff in New York to serve as assistant Project Officer for the conversion of Fort Jay, Governors Island from an Army post to a Coast Guard facility. His duties included developing the organization for the host command and planning all the island's "humanities." For that duty he was awarded the Secretary of Treasury Commendation for Achievement Ribbon. From March 1966 to June 1969, he was executive officer of the Coast Guard Base at Governors Island for which he received a Coast Guard Letter of Commendation. His special duties during that period included community relations with the large island population and labor relations, including negotiating contracts with several different unions.

Gracey served in a number of flag officer assignments prior to becoming commandant, including commander of the Cleveland-based Ninth Coast Guard District, with responsibility for the Great Lakes area; commander of San Francisco-based Twelfth Coast Guard District and Pacific Area, with responsibility for the Pacific Ocean area; and commander of the Governors Island, New York-based Third Coast Guard District and Atlantic Area, with responsibility for the U.S. Eastern seaboard and Gulf Coast.

Gracey died on April 5, 2020, in Falls Church, Virginia, at the age of 92.

== Dates of rank ==
Ensign	Lieutenant, Junior Grade	Lieutenant	Lieutenant Commander	Commander	Captain
O-1	O-2	O-3	O-4	O-5	O-6
June 3, 1949	~1951	~1954	~1959	~1965	July 1969

Commodore	Rear Admiral	Vice Admiral	Admiral
O-7	O-8	O-9	O-10
Never held	October 1, 1974	July 1, 1978	May 28, 1982

Military offices
Preceded by John B. Hayes	Commandant of the Coast Guard; 1982—1986	Succeeded by Paul A. Yost Jr.
