= USS Spruance (DD-963) =

Spruance-class destroyer

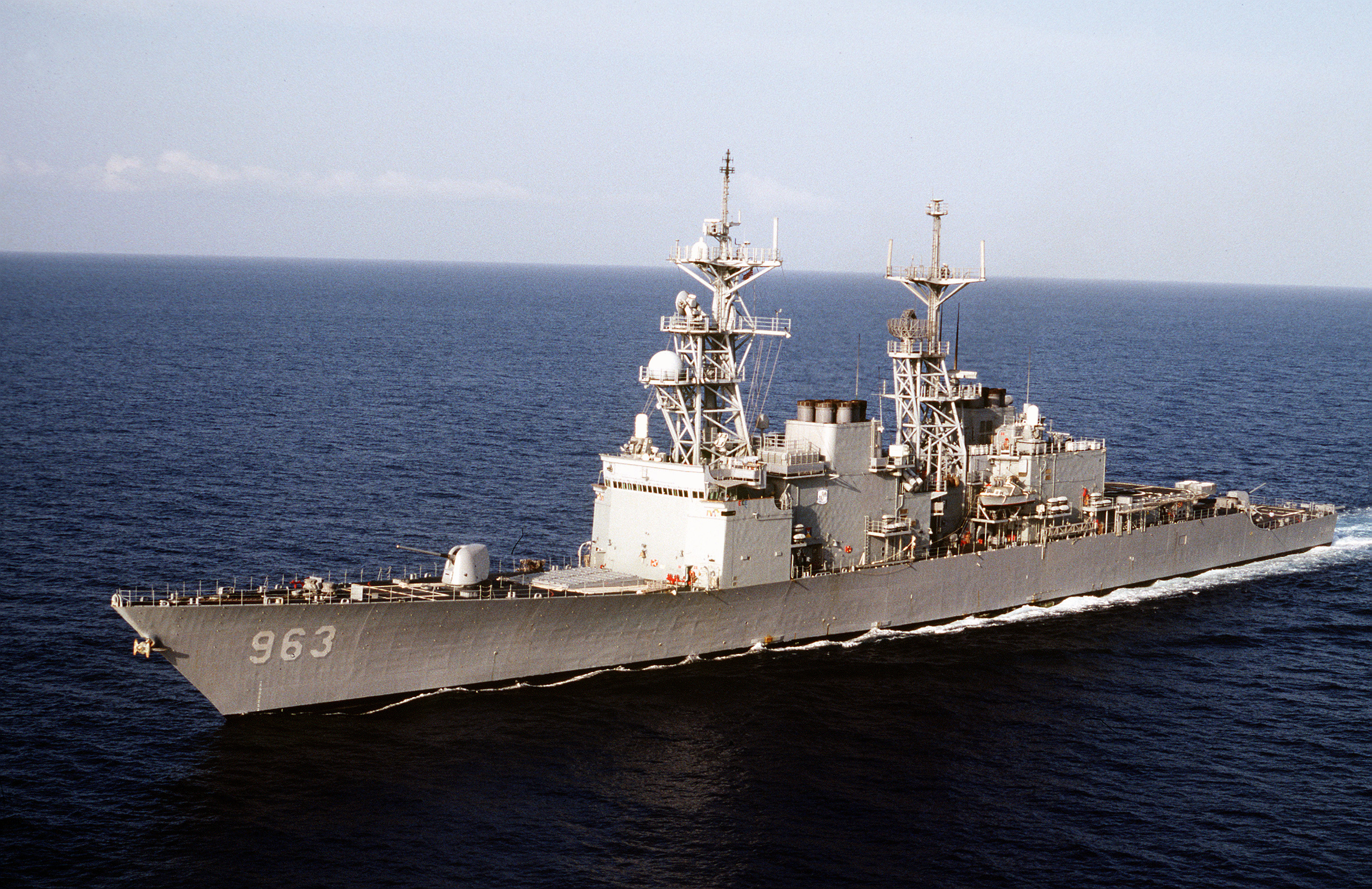
- USS Spruance in Mayport on 21 June 1994

History

United States
- Name: Spruance
- Namesake: Raymond A. Spruance
- Ordered: 23 June 1970
- Builder: Ingalls Shipbuilding
- Laid down: 27 November 1972
- Launched: 10 November 1973
- Acquired: 12 August 1975
- Commissioned: 20 September 1975
- Decommissioned: 23 March 2005
- Stricken: 18 March 2005
- Identification: Callsign: NDQV; Hull number: DD-963
- Motto: Wisdom, Fortitude, Reason
- Nickname(s): The Spru-Can; Spru
- Fate: Sunk as target, 8 December 2006
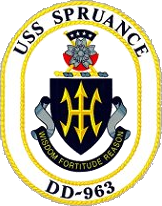
- Badge

General characteristics
- Class & type: Spruance-class destroyer
- Displacement: 8,040 long tons (8,170 t) full load
- Length: 529 ft (161 m) waterline; 563 ft (172 m) overall
- Beam: 55 ft (17 m)
- Draft: 29 ft (8.8 m)
- Installed power: 3 × 501-K17 generator sets (2,000 kW (2,700 hp) each)
- Propulsion: 4 × General Electric LM2500 gas turbines, 2 shafts, 80,000 shp (60 MW)
- Speed: 32.5 knots (60.2 km/h; 37.4 mph)
- Range: 6,000 nmi (11,000 km; 6,900 mi) at 20 knots (37 km/h; 23 mph)
- Complement: 19 officers, 315 enlisted
- Sensors & processing systems: AN/SPS-40 air search radar; AN/SPG-60 fire control radar; AN/SPS-55 surface search radar; AN/SPQ-9 gun fire control radar; Mark 23 TAS automatic detection and tracking radar; AN/SPS-65 missile fire control radar; AN/SQS-53 bow-mounted active sonar; AN/SQR-19 TACTAS towed array passive sonar; Naval Tactical Data System
- Electronic warfare & decoys: AN/SLQ-32 electronic warfare system; AN/SLQ-25 Nixie torpedo countermeasures; Mark 36 SRBOC decoy launching system; AN/SLQ-49 inflatable decoys
- Armament: 2 × 5 in (127 mm) 54 caliber Mark 45 dual purpose guns; 2 × 20 mm Phalanx CIWS Mark 15 guns; 1 × 8 cell ASROC launcher (removed); 1 × 8 cell NATO Sea Sparrow Mark 29 missile launcher; 2 × quadruple Harpoon missile canisters; 2 × Mark 32 triple 12.75 in (324 mm) torpedo tubes (Mk 46 torpedoes); 1 × 61 cell Mk 41 VLS launcher for Tomahawk missiles
- Aircraft carried: 2 × Sikorsky SH-60 Seahawk LAMPS III helicopters
- Aviation facilities: Flight deck and enclosed hangar for up to two medium-lift helicopters

USS Spruance (DD-963) was the lead ship of the United States Navy's Spruance class of destroyers and was named after Admiral Raymond A. Spruance. Spruance was built by the Ingalls Shipbuilding Division of Litton Industries at Pascagoula, Mississippi, and launched by Mrs. Raymond A. Spruance. Spruance served in the U.S. Atlantic Fleet, assigned to Destroyer Squadron 24 and operating out of Naval Station Mayport, Florida. Spruance was decommissioned on 23 March 2005 and then was sunk as a target on 8 December 2006.

== History ==
=== 1960s ===
Bath Iron Works, General Dynamics, and Litton Industries submitted proposals for production of DD-963 on 3 April 1969. Of the $30 million assigned, $28.5 million had been provided to three contractors. Eventually, Litton's bid won the competition.

=== 1970s ===
Spruance was the first of a highly successful class of antisubmarine and antiship destroyers, and was the first destroyer powered by gas turbines in the U.S. Navy. At first, she was armed with two 5-inch naval guns, an ASROC missile launcher, and an eight-cell NATO Sea Sparrow missile launcher. Spruance received one Mark 41 Vertical Launch System (VLS) during the late 1980s. This replaced the original Mark 16 ASROC launcher. Also added to Spruance after several years of service was an eight-cell launcher for Harpoon antiship missiles.

Spruance's first operational deployment was in October 1979 to the Mediterranean Sea, as a member of the USS Saratoga Carrier Battle Group. The other warships in this task force included USS Biddle, USS Conyngham, USS Milwaukee, and USS Mount Baker. During this deployment, Spruance made a transit into the Black Sea to conduct surveillance on the new Soviet helicopter carrier, Moskva, as she steamed from her building shipyard to the Soviet Red Banner Northern Fleet. Spruance suffered a malfunction in one of her LM2500 gas-turbine main engines and had to replace the engine while deployed. This was done successfully in port.

Spruance, being the first gas turbine-powered ship in the U.S. fleet, had an underway replenishment breakaway flag (flown while pulling away from receiving supplies and fuel from a logistics ship at sea) that was a replication of the large yellow warning seen on the side of aircraft carriers, with red block letters saying "BEWARE JET BLAST" on a large yellow background. Upon "breaking" (unfurling) the flag on the halyards, she would play the theme song from the 1976 film Rocky as she increased speed and sailed ahead of the logistics vessel.

=== 1980s ===
Spruance entered her first major overhaul in 1980 at the Norfolk Naval Shipyard. During a brief shipyard period in 1983, she received the Phalanx CIWS and the TAS Mk 23 radar system.

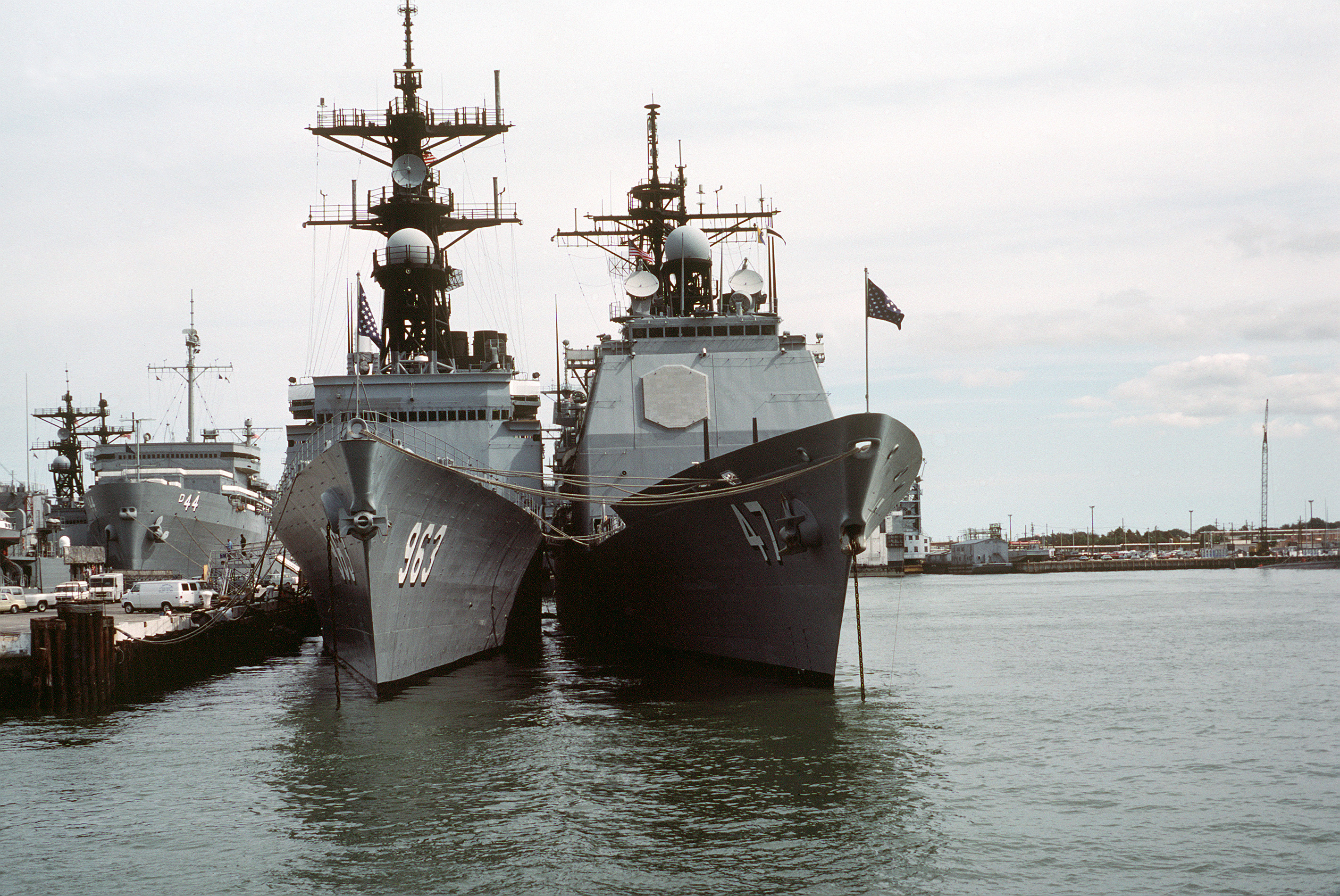
USS Spruance alongside USS Ticonderoga on 8 October 1983

Spruance steamed to the Arabian Sea in 1983, including a port visit to Mombasa, Kenya, in May 1983. She briefly took station off Beirut in June 1982, before being relieved. In 1982, she transited both the Suez Canal and the Panama Canal during the same summer.

Spruance deployed for a six-month period in January 1983 to the Persian Gulf, where she spent 4-1/2 months conducting observations in company with USS Oliver Hazard Perry during the Iraq-Iran War. She also conducted operations with Teamwork '84 in the northern Atlantic and in the Arctic Ocean in 1984. She deployed to the Mediterranean Sea in November 1984 and conducted her second Black Sea operations over Thanksgiving 1984. She returned from her deployment in May 1985 and shortly thereafter entered her second overhaul period, during which she received VLS, Towed Array, and the SH 60. She deployed for a six-month period on 26 May 1993 to the Red Sea where she spent over 3-1/2 months conducting visit-and-board and search operations in support of United Nations sanctions against Iraq. While attached to the U.S. Sixth Fleet, Spruance conducted a brief stop for fuel in Rota, Spain, followed by a liberty port visit in Palma, Spain. Her additional stops in the Mediterranean consisted of a brief stop in Augusta Bay, Sicily, then to Souda Bay, Crete, for a maintenance period (IMAV) with USS Shenandoah. Spruance passed through the Suez Canal on 29 June.

Admirals Vern Clark and Gary Roughead (who later went on to become the 27th and 29th chiefs of Naval Operations, respectively), were Spruance's commanding officer and executive officer, respectively, from 1984 to 1985.

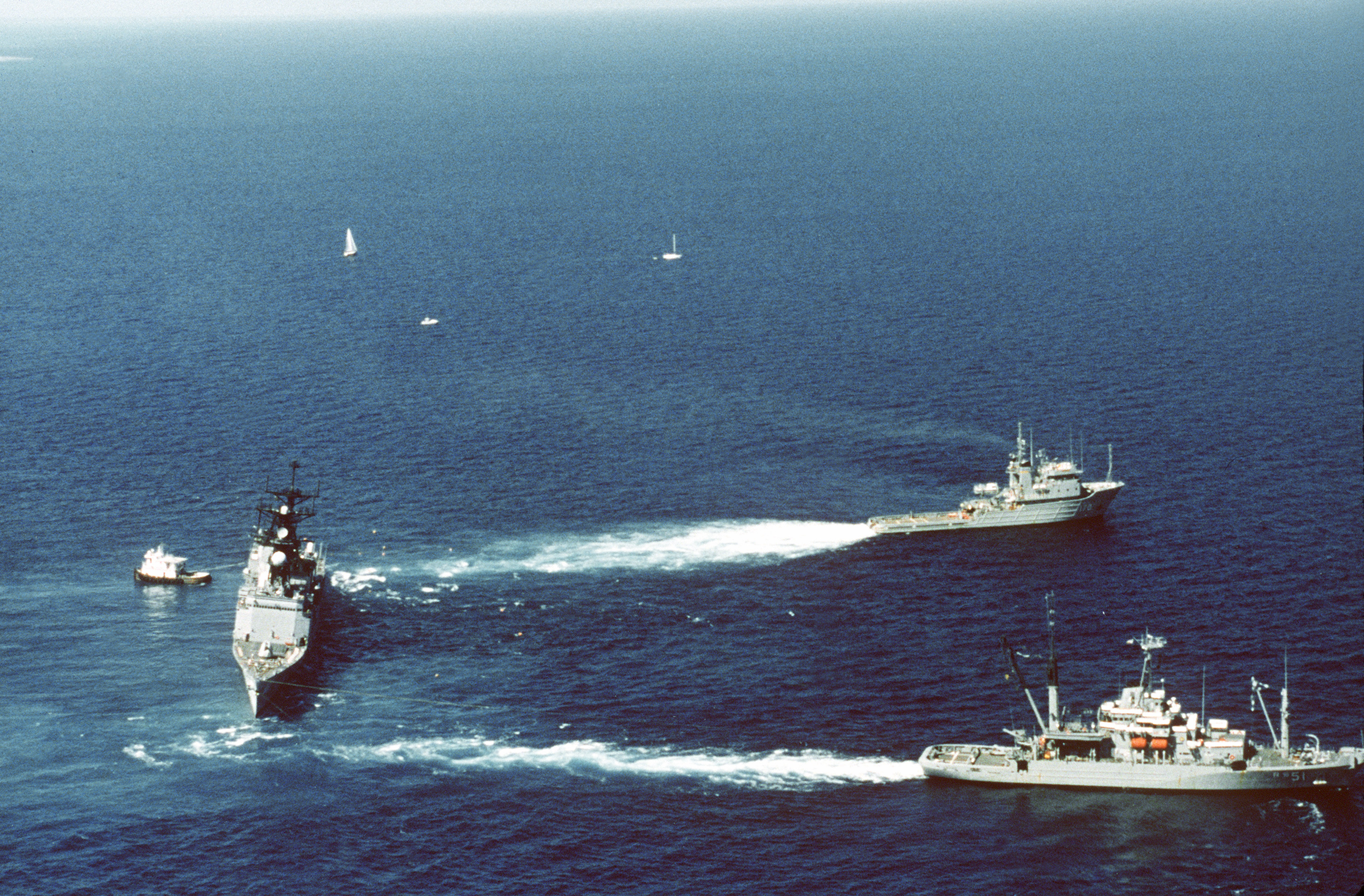
Spruance is pulled by USNS Mohawk and USNS Salvor off a coral reef, 25 January 1989

On 26 January 1989, Spruance ran aground on a reef while traveling at 3 knots (5.6 km/h; 3.5 mph) near Andros Island in the Bahamas. The incident occurred during antisubmarine training exercises in the deep-water trench east of the island. Navy tugs and the USS Boone refloated the ship, which suffered $1.8 million in damage to the hull, propellers, sonar dome, and forward mast. A Navy report faulted a junior officer who had conduct at the time of the incident, Lt. W.T. Hicks, finding that he ignored the advice of the quartermaster, who had advised against a course change that would take the ship closer to the reef. Hicks was discharged from the Navy following the grounding. Neither the ship's skipper, Commander Travis W. Parker Jr., nor the executive officer, Commander J.M. Braeckel, was on the bridge at the time of the maneuvers that led to the grounding.

=== 1990s ===
Upon arrival in the Red Sea, under command of CTG 152.1, Commander Maritime Interdiction Forces, Spruance assumed the duties of the flagship for the task force commander. While on station, Spruance was the flagship for three different task force commanders. While on station, Spruance conducted exercises with the Egyptian Navy and the Jordanian Navy. During Spruance's tenure in the Red Sea, she conducted several port visits to Hurghada, Egypt, for crew rest and relaxation. Other official port visits were conducted in Safaga, Egypt, and Aqaba, Jordan, where Spruance hosted receptions for top military and embassy officials. On 10 September 1993, Spruance intercepted the 18,000th ship since sanctions were put into place in August 1990, as part of the multinational maritime interception effort enforcing United Nations sanctions against Iraq. The ship's crew intercepted the Maltese-flagged bulk carrier "Early Star" in the North Red Sea during normal intercept operations. The merchant ship was sailing from Massaua, Eritrea, to Aqaba. As the ship was empty, it was allowed to proceed toward its destination.

Spruance was relieved as flagship by USS Hayler on 9 October after having completed more than 170 boardings, and then started her transit homeward through the Suez Canal on 11 October. Once back in the Mediterranean Sea, the ship made port calls in Toulon, France; Alicante, Spain; and Rota, Spain. She returned home on 14 November.

In July 1994, as part of Operation Restore Democracy, U.S. Navy ships were assigned to helping to enforce the United Nations embargo of Haiti. However, so many Haitians were picked up from the sea that U.S. Coast Guard ships needed assisance from U.S. Navy ships in the region to handle the volume. Among these was Spruance, which took onboard 900 Haitians for the transit to Guantanamo Naval Station.

Spruance transferred to Portsmouth, Virginia, and entered drydock after the deployment.

In mid-1996, Spruance took part in the 24th annual U.S. invitational maritime exercise in the Baltic Sea, the BALTOPS 96 exercise. Made up of air, surface, and subsurface operations, the exercise involved 47 ships and aircraft from 12 different squadrons sent by 13 NATO-member and Partnership for Peace nations: Belgium, Denmark, Estonia, Finland, Germany, Lithuania, Latvia, the Netherlands, Poland, Russia, Sweden, the United Kingdom, and the United States.

Spruance steamed in the Mediterranean from April through October 1997 with the carrier battle group supporting USS John F. Kennedy. Serving as the flagstaff of Destroyer Squadron 24, Spruance made significant contributions throughout the deployment, including visiting 13 foreign ports, participating in five multinational naval exercises in the Mediterranean and Black Seas, serving as Presidential Support Ship in Rotterdam, the Netherlands, representing the U.S. Navy in Thoule Sur Mer, France, in commemorating the 52nd anniversary of the Allied landings in southern France, and hosting Ukrainian military and diplomatic distinguished visitors during the 1997 Ukrainian Independence Day celebration. During that period, Spruance also took part in the Exercise Sea Breeze 97 in the Black Sea, which trained military forces on how to provide humanitarian relief for victims of a simulated earthquake in Southern Ukraine.

In the fall of 1999, Spruance detached from the John F. Kennedy carrier group to relieve USS Peterson as the U.S. representative to the Standing Naval Forces Mediterranean (STANAVFORMED). After dealing with the effects of Hurricane Floyd and Hurricane Gert off the east coast of Florida, Spruance crossed the Atlantic and entered the Mediterranean with other ships from the John F. Kennedy carrier group. STANAVFORMED is part of NATO's Reaction Force and as such was ready to respond to any crisis in NATO's area of interest, although its primary area of operations is the Mediterranean. Spruance was expected to remain assigned to STANAVFORMED through March 2000.

=== 2000s ===
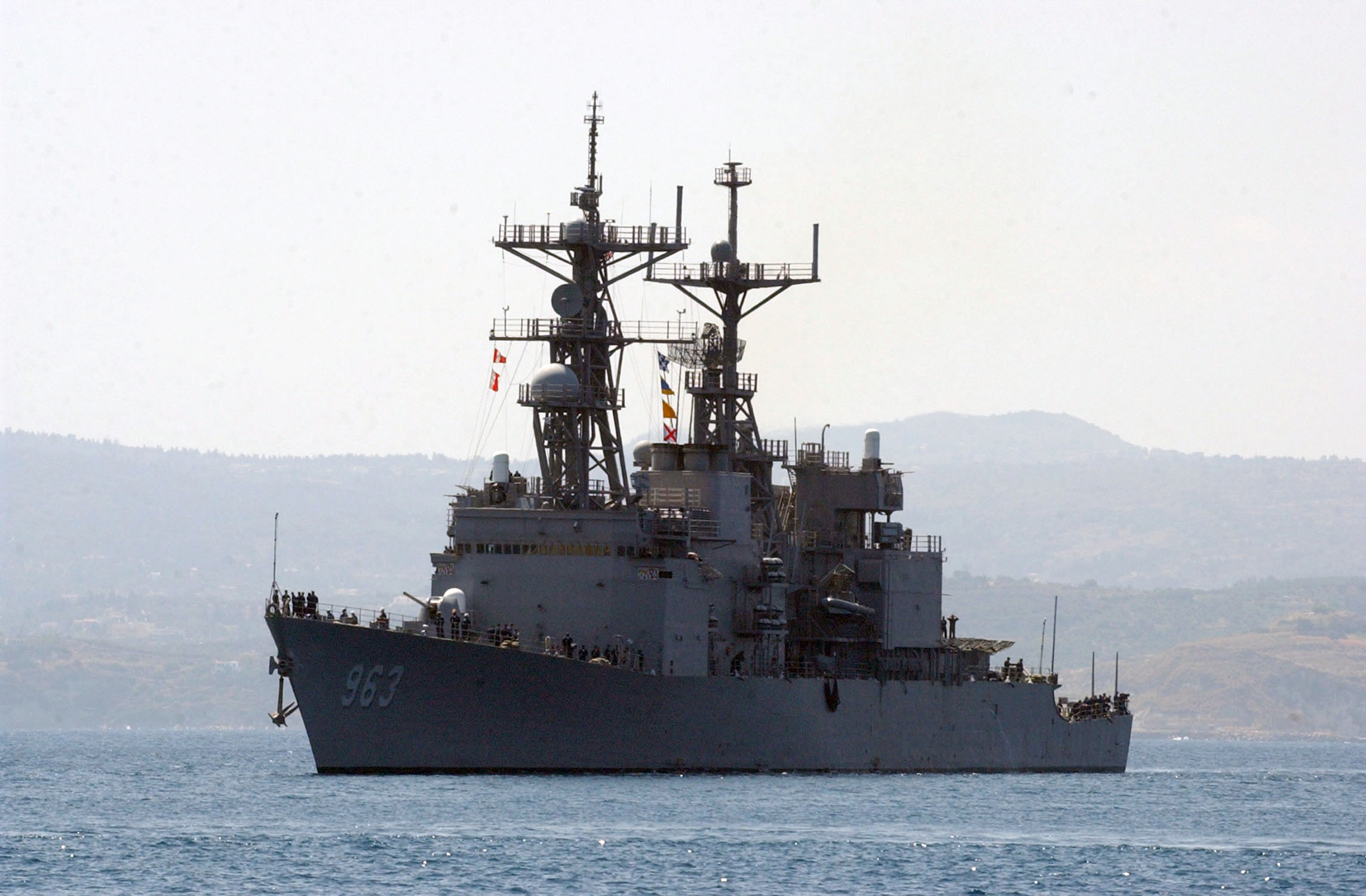
Spruance arrives for a port visit in Crete in 2004

On 1 June 2000, Spruance became the first U.S. Navy ship to use the drydock in Jacksonville, Florida, in over 10 years. She left Naval Station Mayport, Florida, early on 1 June, traveled up the St. John's River to the drydock facility, and remained there until early August. During the drydock, the ship was raised out of the water, her hull was cleaned and inspected, and corrective and preventive maintenance tasks were performed. On 24 September 2001, as part of the John F. Kennedy Carrier Battle Group, Spruance commenced use of the Vieques Island inner range in conjunction with their Composite Unit Training Exercises (COMPTUEX). The exercise, which began the week prior, also used the northern and southern Puerto Rican operating areas and involved complex battle-group training events, naval surface fire-support training, and air-to-ground bombing. COMPTUEX is an intermediate-level battle-group exercise designed to forge the battle group into a cohesive fighting team and is a critical step in the predeployment training cycle and prerequisite for the battle group's Joint Task Force Exercise scheduled for early the following year. Successful completion of the COMPTUEX also certifies the carrier and her embarked air wing as qualified for open-ocean operations.

Spruance, along with the John F. Kennedy carrier group, took part from 19 January through 26 January 2002 in Phase I of Joint Task Force Exercise (JTFEX) 02–1; and from 7 – 14 February in Phase II of Joint Task Force Exercise (JTFEX) 02–1. The JTFEX is designed to meet the requirement for quality, realistic training to prepare U.S. forces for joint and combined operations and also provides the opportunity to certify the CVBG for deployment. That particular JTFEX was scheduled for two phases to accommodate recent repairs to the carrier, which required her to be pierside during Phase I. The exercise took place in the waters off the East Coast, as well as on training ranges in North Carolina and Florida.

Deploying with the John F. Kennedy carrier group in June 2004, Spruance returned to Mayport on 7 December 2004. She decommissioned 23 March 2005. She was sunk as a target for aircraft-launched Harpoon missiles in the Atlantic Ocean off the Virginia Capes on 8 December 2006.

== Awards ==
- Joint Meritorious Unit Award – (Jun-Aug 1991, Feb-Mar 1992)
- Navy Unit Commendation – (Jan-Feb 1991, Aug 1990-Nov 1991)
- Navy Meritorious Unit Commendation – (Jan-Apr 1980, May-Jul 1996, Jan 1999-Sep 2001, Apr-Sep 2002)
- Navy E Ribbon – (1978, 1990, 1994, 1995, 1996, 1998)
- Southwest Asia Service Medal – (Feb-Mar 1991)

== See also ==
- List of ships sunk by missiles
- List of United States Navy destroyers
