= For What It's Worth (novel) =

2012 book by Janet Tashjian

- Author: Janet Tashjian
- Language: English
- Publisher: Henry Holt and Co.
- Publication date: 7/3/2012
- Pages: 288
- ISBN: 978-0805093650

For What It’s Worth is the tenth book for children by Janet Tashjian. It is a young adult novel published by Henry Holt and Company. The title is taken from the 1967 Buffalo Springfield song of the same name.

The novel's setting is Southern California in 1971. A teenaged band musician is facing sudden changes in his life. In need of guidance, he uses a Ouija board to contact the spirits of the deceased musicians Janis Joplin, Jimi Hendrix, and Jim Morrison and asks for their help. His would-be spirit guides actually give him bad advice.

== Plot ==
Quinn is a 14-year-old boy growing up in Laurel Canyon in 1971, the center of the Southern California music scene. He starts a band, finally gets a girlfriend, and continues to add to his record collection until he meets a draft dodger and his perfect world falls apart. Through his Ouija board, he contacts Club 27 – the spirits of Janis Joplin, Jimi Hendrix, and Jim Morrison. The rock icons give him bad advice Quinn struggles to understand.
