= Vote for Larry =

2004 novel by Janet Tashjian

- First edition
- Author: Janet Tashjian
- Language: English
- Series: Larry
- Genre: Realistic fiction, comedy, political fiction
- Publisher: Henry Holt and Co.
- Publication date: May 1, 2004
- Publication place: United States
- Media type: Print (Hardback & Paperback)
- Pages: 240 pp
- ISBN: 0-8050-7201-2
- OCLC: 52766070
- LC Class: PZ7.T211135 Vo 2004
- Preceded by: The Gospel According to Larry
- Followed by: Larry and the Meaning of Life

Vote for Larry is a political comedy young adult novel by Janet Tashjian. The novel is the sequel to The Gospel According to Larry, and stems around the 2004 United States presidential election. It follows Josh Swensen, who runs for U.S. President under his anti-consumerist persona as Internet celebrity "Larry".

== Plot ==
After faking the suicide of his online persona "Larry", Josh Swensen has hidden in Boulder, Colorado under the pseudonym of Mark and enrolled at the University of Colorado Boulder. He is kidnapped by his old friend Beth, who persuades him to return him to his "Larry" persona and run for office. She suggests he runs for Massachusetts state representative in the Congress, but he decides to run for U.S. President.

He has difficulty maintaining his austerity, problems with his girlfriend and ex-girlfriend, a threat from his nemesis betagold, self-identity problems, and the rather unusual problem of running for U.S. President. Among other problems is the problem of almost being killed by an opponent in the candidacy for president. In this book, the fictional Congress passes a constitutional amendment to lower the presidential age requirement to 18.

== Characters ==
- Josh Swensen: The main character who is the Peace Party candidate for United States president in 2004. He is also known as Larry online and Mark Paulson when hiding in Colorado.
- Janine: Josh's girlfriend in Colorado, who is originally from Seattle and enjoys shopping and her dog.
- Beth: Josh's old friend in Massachusetts who kidnaps Josh and convinces him to run for office.
- Simon: Beth's boyfriend who is a well-educated young man from England. His presence at many times makes Josh jealous of his relationship with Beth. He sings comical mondegreens of Christmas carols.
- betagold: The screen name of Tracy Hawthorne, a 60-year-old woman who was obsessed with and succeeded in discovering the true identity of "Larry" in The Gospel According To Larry.
- Peter: Larry's stepfather who was formerly an advertiser, but quit and became a house painter to become "more in touch with his life"

== Reception ==
In a starred review, Publishers Weekly referred to Vote for Larry as "clever" and "inspiring" while indicating that "the topical yet universal themes make this book even more compelling than the first".

Kirkus Reviews wrote, "Politics, romance, important social issues, and even a saboteur in the wings make this a fun, spirited romp through an election year." They further noted that "Tashjian’s lively, comic prose, coupled with her characters’ anger at politics as usual in this country, may just inspire young readers to become young voters."

Booklist also reviewed novel, as well as the audiobook narrated by Jesse Eisenberg.
