= Vern Clark =

United States Navy admiral

Vernon E. Clark
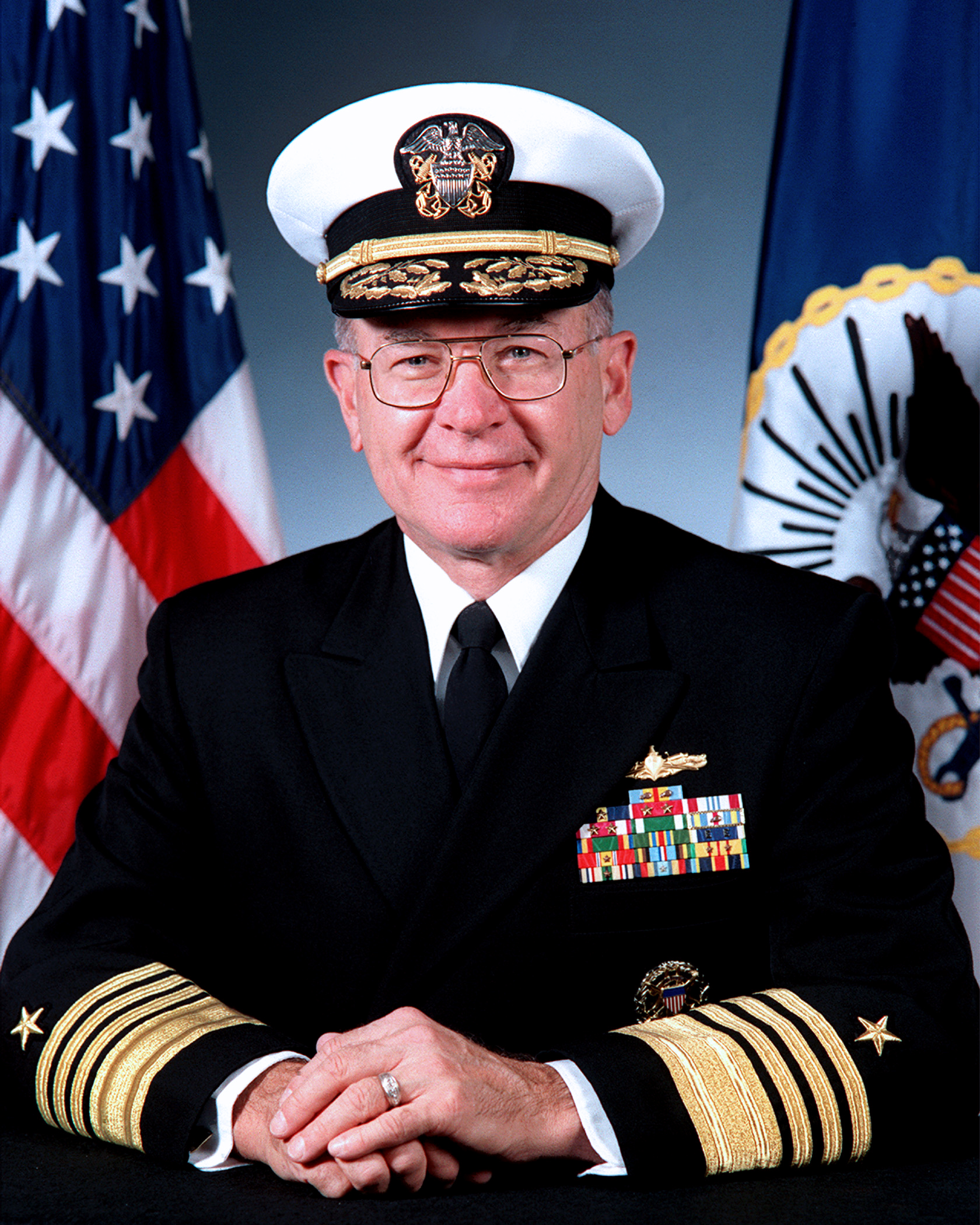
- Clark in 2000
- Born: September 7, 1944 (age 82); Sioux City, Iowa, U.S.
- Military career
- Allegiance: United States
- Branch: United States Navy
- Service years: 1968–2005
- Rank: Admiral
- Commands: Chief of Naval Operations; United States Atlantic Fleet; United States Second Fleet; Cruiser-Destroyer Group 3 Destroyer Squadron 17; Destroyer Squadron 5 USS Spruance (DD-963); USS Grand Rapids (PG-98)
- Conflicts: Vietnam War; Gulf War
- Awards: Defense Distinguished Service Medal (3); Navy Distinguished Service Medal (3); Army Distinguished Service Medal; Air Force Distinguished Service Medal; Coast Guard Distinguished Service Medal; Legion of Merit (3)
- Other work: Raytheon, Board of Directors; SRI International, Board of Directors

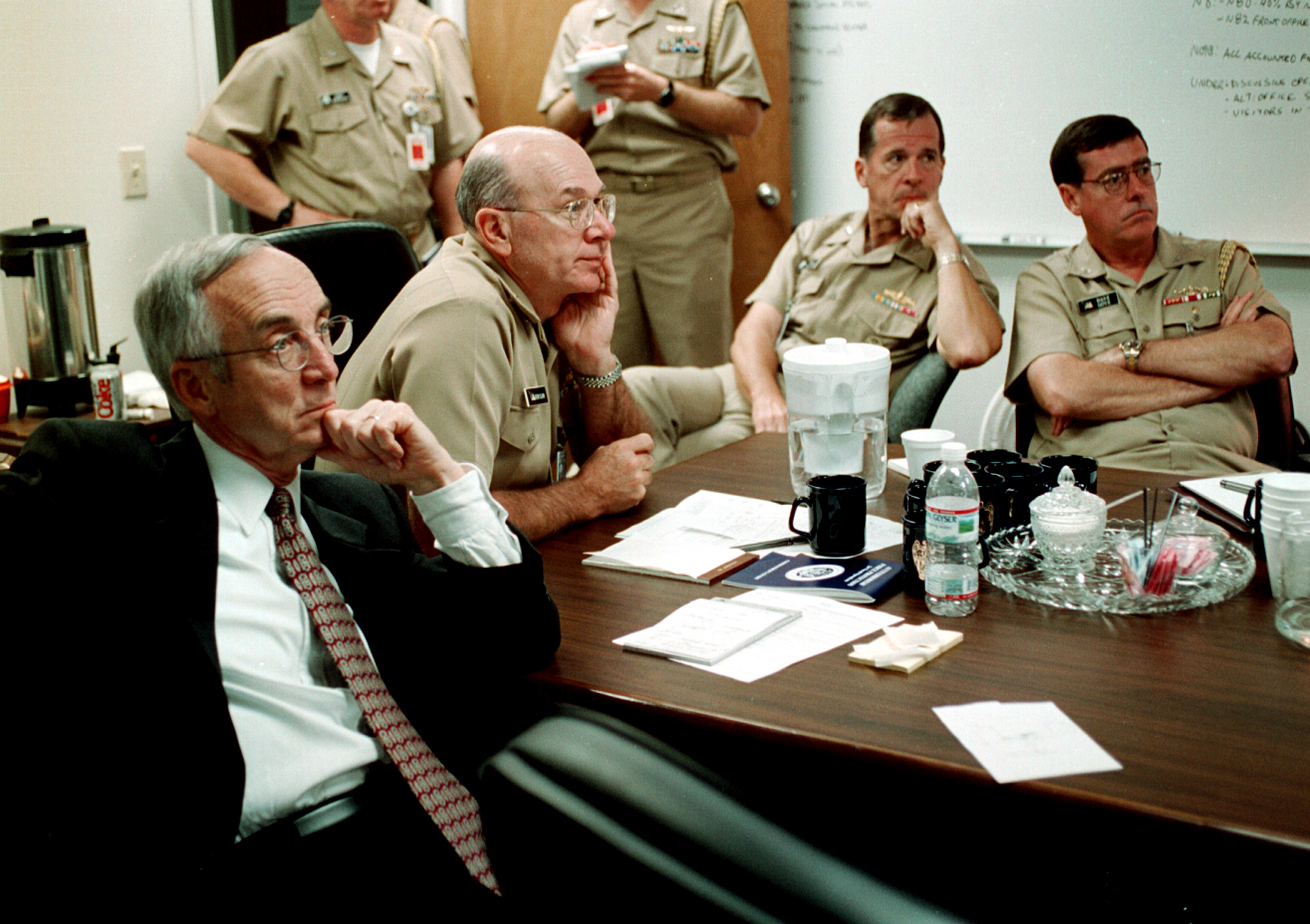
Clark at the Pentagon during the September 11 attacks in 2001.

Vernon Eugene Clark (born September 7, 1944) is a retired admiral who served as the Chief of Naval Operations (CNO) of the United States Navy. He retired on July 22, 2005, making his tenure of five years the second-longest serving CNO behind Arleigh Burke. He currently sits on the board of directors of Raytheon and SRI International. In November 2009, he was selected along with former Secretary of Veterans Affairs Togo West by Defense Secretary Robert Gates to lead the military investigation into the Fort Hood massacre.

== Early life and education ==
Clark was born in Sioux City, Iowa, and grew up in the states of Nebraska, Missouri and Illinois. Clark graduated from Evangel College and earned a Master of Business Administration degree from the University of Arkansas. He attended Officer Candidate School and received his commission in August 1968.

== Career ==
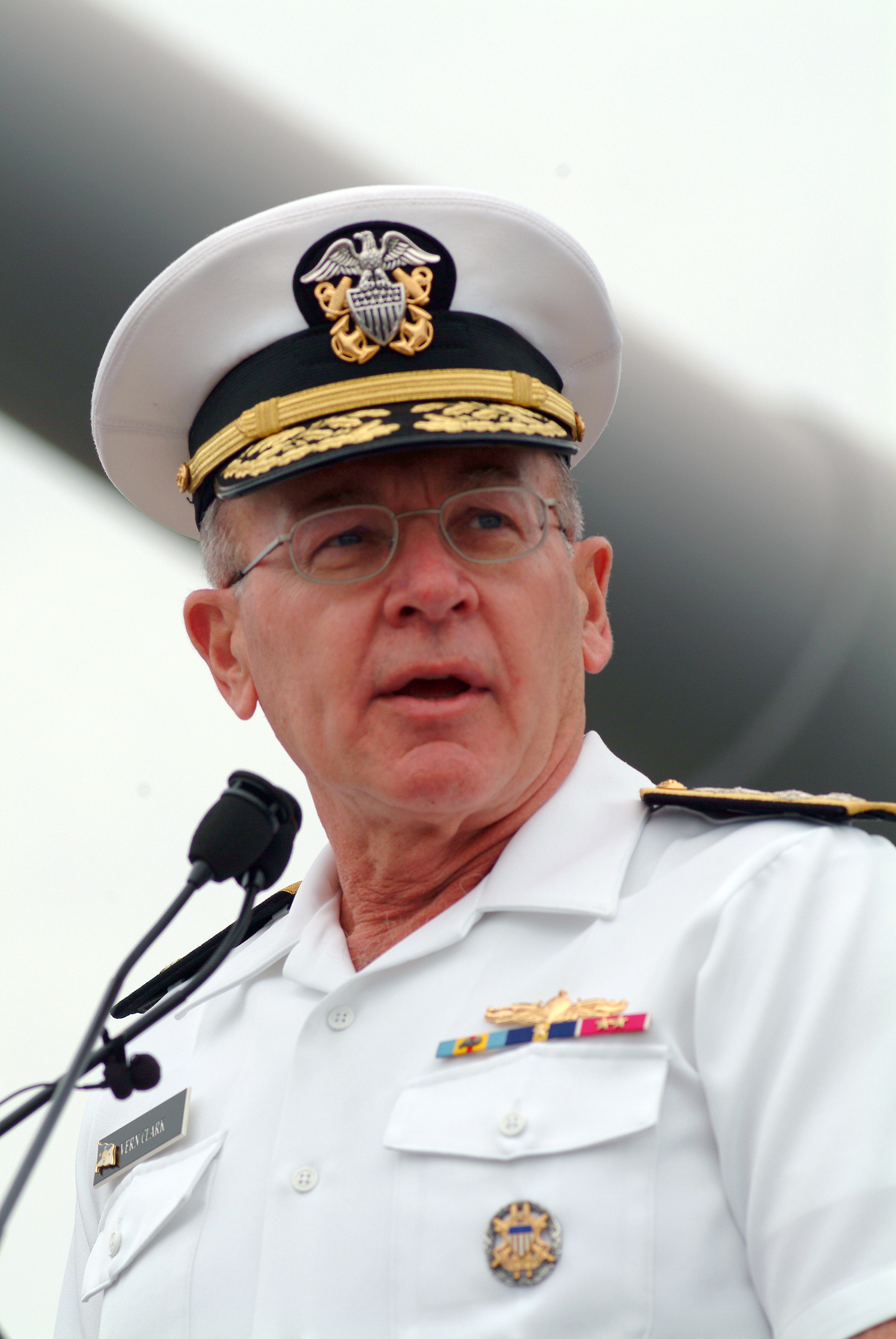
Clark speaking aboard USS Wisconsin (BB-64) in 2005.

Clark served aboard the destroyers USS John W. Weeks (DD-701) and USS Gearing (DD-710). As a lieutenant, he commanded USS Grand Rapids (PG-98). He subsequently commanded USS McCloy (FF-1038), USS Spruance (DD-963), the Atlantic Fleet's Anti-Submarine Warfare Training Center, Destroyer Squadron 17, and Destroyer Squadron 5. After being selected for flag rank, Clark commanded Carl Vinson Battle Group/Cruiser-Destroyer Group 3, Second Fleet, and United States Atlantic Fleet.

Ashore, Clark first served as special assistant to the director of the Systems Analysis Division in the Office of the Chief of Naval Operations. He later completed assignments as the administrative assistant to the Deputy Chief of Naval Operations (Surface Warfare) and as the administrative aide to the Vice Chief of Naval Operations. He served as head of the Cruiser-Destroyer Combat Systems Requirements Section and force anti-submarine warfare officer for the commander of Naval Surface Force, Atlantic Fleet, and he directed the Joint Staff's Crisis Action Team for Operation Desert Shield and Operation Desert Storm.

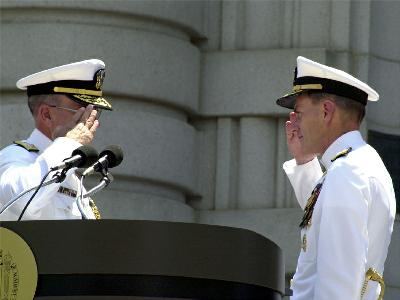
Clark (left) relieving Johnson as Chief of Naval Operations

Clark's first flag assignment was at the United States Transportation Command (TRANSCOM), where he was director of plans and policy (J5) and financial management and analysis (J8). While commanding the Carl Vinson Battle Group, he deployed to the Persian Gulf and later served as the Deputy Commander, Joint Task Force Southwest Asia. Clark has also served as the Deputy and Chief of Staff, United States Atlantic Fleet; the Director of Operations (J3) and subsequently Director, of the Joint Staff. Clark became the 27th Chief of Naval Operations on July 21, 2000, relieving Jay L. Johnson. Since his retirement, Clark has been honored with the Eisenhower Award from the Business Executives for National Security and the Distinguished Sea Service Award from the Naval Order of the United States.

Clark was elected to the board of directors of Raytheon in December 2005 and the board of directors of SRI International in March 2007.

Clark now serves on the board of directors of Raytheon Company, Rolls-Royce North America, SRI International, Horizon Lines, the Armed Forces YMCA, and is on the world board of governors of the USO. He serves as a senior advisor with Booz Allen Hamilton, the Defense Policy Board, the advisory boards of Fleishman-Hillard, Computer Science Corporation, the Comptroller General's advisory board of the GAO, and the executive committee of Military Ministry. In addition, he is currently a distinguished professor at Regent University in Virginia Beach, Virginia. Clark teaches in the Robertson School of Government and the School of Business & Leadership and is a member of the Regent's board of trustees. He was also a member of the Board of Visitors at Air University.

== Awards and decorations ==
Surface Warfare Officer badge
Defense Distinguished Service Medal with two oak leaf clusters
Navy Distinguished Service Medal with two Gold Award Stars
Army Distinguished Service Medal
Air Force Distinguished Service Medal
Coast Guard Distinguished Service Medal
Legion of Merit with two Gold Award Stars
Defense Meritorious Service Medal
Meritorious Service Medal with three Gold Award Stars
Navy and Marine Corps Commendation Medal
Joint Meritorious Unit Award
Navy Unit Commendation
Navy Meritorious Unit Commendation
Navy "E" Ribbon with two Battle E's
National Defense Service Medal with two bronze service stars
Armed Forces Expeditionary Medal
Vietnam Service Medal with two service stars
Southwest Asia Service Medal with one service star
Global War on Terrorism Service Medal
Navy Sea Service Deployment Ribbon with one silver service star
Navy & Marine Corps Overseas Service Ribbon
Order of May of Naval Merit (degree unknown)

Military offices
Preceded by Jay L. Johnson	Chief of Naval Operations; 2000–2005	Succeeded by Michael Mullen
