= Larry and the Meaning of Life =

Novel by Janet Tashjian

- First edition
- Author: Janet Tashjian
- Language: English
- Series: Larry
- Genre: Realistic fiction, comedy
- Publisher: Henry Holt and Co.
- Publication date: September 16, 2008
- Publication place: U.S.
- Pages: 224pp
- ISBN: 978-0-8050-7735-3
- OCLC: 190785890
- LC Class: PZ7.T211135 Lar 2008
- Preceded by: Vote for Larry

Larry and the Meaning of Life is the third installment in author Janet Tashjian's novel series about anti-consumerist Internet celebrity Josh "Larry" Swensen. It is the sequel to The Gospel According to Larry and Vote for Larry. It was released on September 16, 2008.

The novel centers on a revelation Josh experiences at Walden Pond. Tashjian has stated that this book will be more comedic in nature than the previous installments, calling it "a laugh-out-loud page-turner".
