= Archie R. Clemins =

United States Navy admiral (1943–2020)

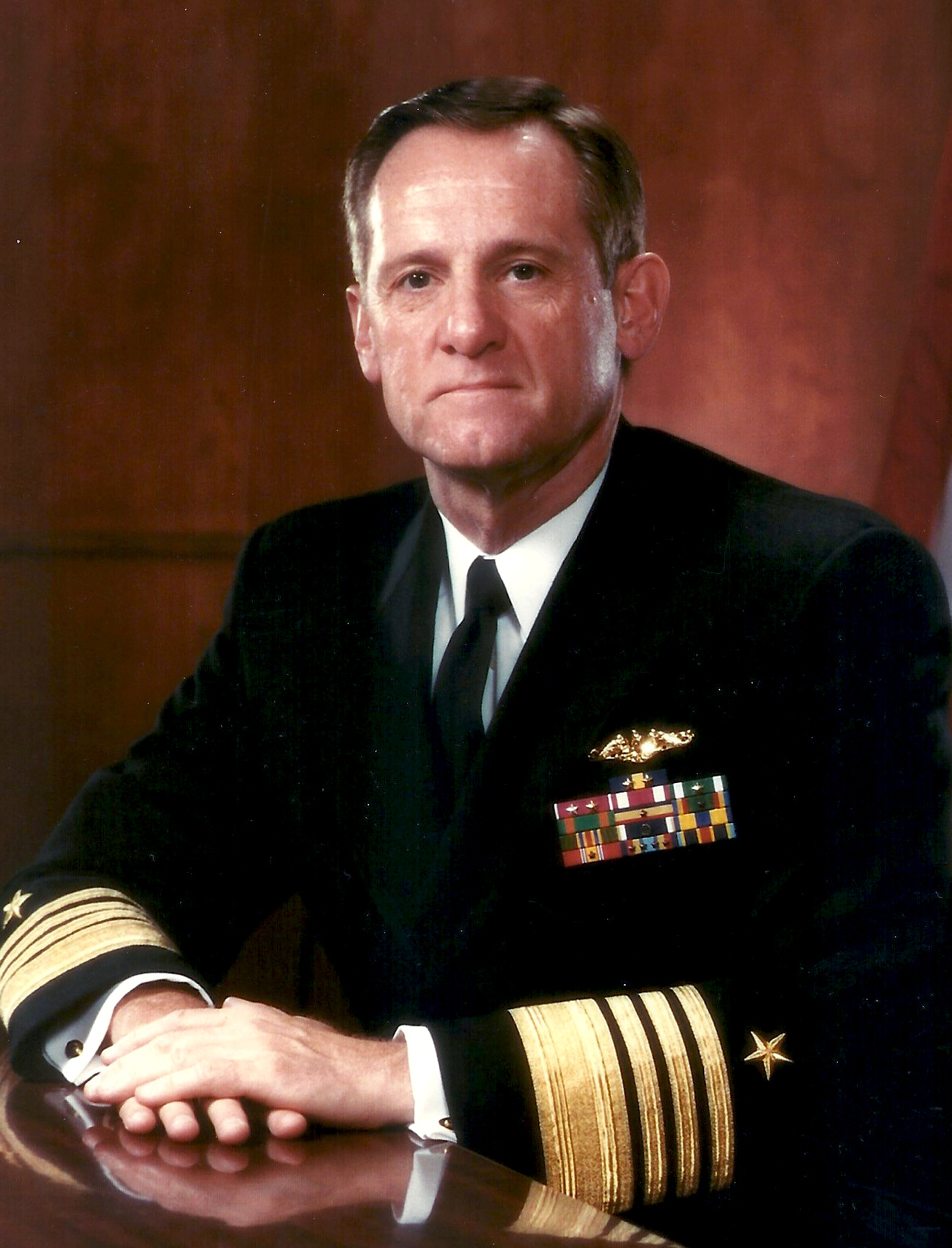
- Admiral Archie R. Clemins
- Born: November 18, 1943; Mount Vernon, Illinois, U.S.
- Died: March 14, 2020 (aged 76); Boise, Idaho, U.S.
- Military career
- Allegiance: United States
- Branch: United States Navy
- Service years: 1966–1999
- Rank: Admiral
- Commands: Pacific Fleet
- Awards: Navy Distinguished Service Medal; Legion of Merit

Archie Ray Clemins (November 18, 1943 – March 14, 2020) was a United States Navy four star admiral who served as Commander in Chief, United States Pacific Fleet (CINCPACFLT) from 1996 to 1999.

== Military career ==
Clemins was born in Mount Vernon, Illinois on November 18, 1943, and graduated from the University of Illinois at Urbana-Champaign with a Bachelor of Science degree in electrical engineering. He was commissioned upon graduation and entered the Naval Nuclear Power program, serving aboard ballistic missile submarines. He returned to the University of Illinois for a master's degree.

Before being promoted to flag rank in 1991, Clemins commanded the USS Pogy (SSN-647). As an admiral he commanded Pacific Fleet Training Command in San Diego, California, and the Seventh Fleet in Yokosuka, Japan. His final assignment was Commander in Chief of the United States Pacific Fleet. He retired from active duty on December 1, 1999, and settled with his wife, Marilyn, in Boise, Idaho.

== Awards and honors ==
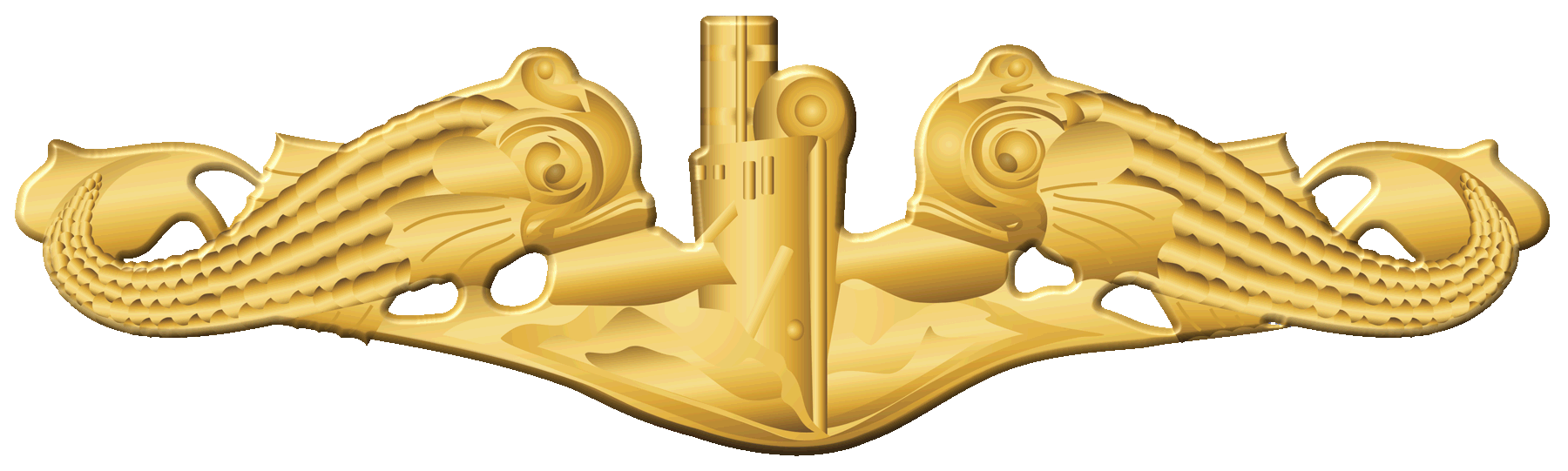
Submarine Warfare insignia (Officer)

Navy Distinguished Service Medal with two gold award stars
Legion of Merit with two award stars
Meritorious Service Medal
Navy Commendation Medal with award star
Navy Achievement Medal
Navy and Marine Corps Presidential Unit Citation with one bronze service star
Navy Unit Commendation with service star
Navy Meritorious Unit Commendation
Navy "E" Ribbon with one Battle E award
Navy Expeditionary Medal
National Defense Service Medal with service star
Navy Sea Service Deployment Ribbon with silver service star
Navy & Marine Corps Overseas Service Ribbon

== Post military career ==
After retiring from the navy, he established Caribou Technologies, Inc., and became co-owner of TableRock International LLC, both consulting firms for technology and business development. He was the 2002 recipient of the Naval Order of the United States Distinguished Sea Service Award.

Clemins recommended Australia as a location for new military testing sites to be used by both the Australian Defence Force and the US military as a result of disappearing sites in America. Speaking to The West Australian, he stated "You have to have places to drop bombs, you have to have places to shoot live weapons, places to fly planes over that make noise, places where you can actually test and exercise your capabilities. I think Australia in the future is going to be one of the places we'd like to exercise with the Australians, as well as with the US Navy. You now have some of the finest ranges in the Western Pacific which we cannot get anywhere else." Later the US military would indeed use Australia as a military exercising camp in the form of Exercise Talisman Sabre, which is held every 2 years since 2001 in about July.

He died at his home in Boise, Idaho, on March 14, 2020.
