= James Madison Memorial Fellowship Foundation =

Foundation established by United States Congress in 1986

- Type: Federal agency
- Established: 1986
- President: Julie E. Adams
- Location: 1613 Duke Street Alexandria, VA
- Nickname: James Madison Foundation
- Website: www.jamesmadison.gov

The James Madison Memorial Fellowship Foundation was established by the United States Congress in 1986 to encourage outstanding current and future secondary school teachers of American history, American government, and social studies in grades 7 through 12 to undertake graduate study of the roots, framing, principles, and development of the Constitution of the United States. The Foundation thus permanently commemorates the bicentennial of the Constitution and honors James Madison, fourth President of the United States and generally acknowledged "Father of the Constitution and the Bill of Rights."

== History ==
As part of the bicentennial celebration of the U.S. Constitution, the Education Committee of the Commission on the Bicentennial of the United States Constitution, chaired by Senator Edward M. Kennedy, proposed the creation of a fellowship program for the purpose of improving teaching about the Constitution in secondary schools. Senator Kennedy and several other Senate colleagues successfully passed the law which created the Foundation. Public Law 99-591 establishing the James Madison Memorial Fellowship Foundation was signed by President Ronald Reagan on October 30, 1986. The primary function of the Foundation is to administer a fellowship program encouraging graduate study of the U.S. Constitution. The Foundation is governed by a thirteen-member Board of trustees appointed to six year terms by the President. President Reagan appointed the first members of the board of trustees in 1988. In November of that same year, the Board of Trustees elected Senator Edward M. Kennedy as the first Chairman of the Board for the Foundation and Senator Orrin G. Hatch, Treasurer. In 1990, the Board of Trustees named retired Commandant of the U.S. Coast Guard, Admiral Paul A. Yost Jr. as the first president of the James Madison Memorial Foundation. The Foundation awarded its inaugural class of 48 James Madison Fellows in 1992. The James Madison Foundation continues to conduct yearly nationwide competitions for the award of James Madison Fellowships. Generally, one Fellowship per state is awarded each year as funding is available. Upon receiving their master's degree, James Madison Fellows complete a teaching obligation to fulfill the requirements of their fellowship. The Foundation operates from an endowment, initially funded by the federal government. The Foundation receives donations from private citizens, corporations, and foundations to expand the fellowship program throughout the nation.

== Governance ==
The Foundation has a Board of Trustees. Daily operations of the Foundation are directed by a president and a small staff. In 2024, Julie E. Adams was appointed President of the Foundation, replacing Lewis F. Larsen who retired as president after serving since 2010. Larsen had taken over from Paul A. Yost Jr., who had served since 1990. The Foundation's office is located in Alexandria, Virginia.

=== Board of trustees ===
The board of trustees is composed of 13 members, 6 of which are appointed by the president of the United States with the consent of the United States Senate. Of these, one is the chief executive officer of a state (i.e. Governor), two are members of the general public, and three are members of the academic community, appointed upon the recommendation of the Librarian of Congress. No more than three of the presidentially-appointed members may be affiliated with the same political party.

Four trustees are members of Congress, two members each from the Senate and the House of Representatives. These are appointed by the president. The members of the Senate are recommended by the President pro tempore of the Senate, in consultation with the majority and minority leaders of the Senate. The members of the House are recommended by the Speaker, in consultation with the minority leader of the House.

Two trustees are members of the Federal judiciary, and are appointed by the President upon the recommendation of the Chief Justice of the United States.

These members are appointed to terms of six years, but they may continue to serve on the board until a successor is confirmed, though limited to the end of the then session of Congress.

In addition, the U.S. Secretary of Education, or their designee, serve as an ex officio member of the board, though is ineligible to serve as chairman.

=== Current board members ===
The current board members as of April 26, 2026:

Position	Name	Party	Group	Confirmed	Term expiration
Member	Vacant		General public		
Member	Vacant		General public		
Member	Vacant		CEO of a state		
Member	Vacant		Academic community		
Member	Vacant		Academic community		
Member	Vacant		Academic community		
Member	Raymond M. Kethledge	Independent	Federal court	2024	—
Member	Vacant		Federal court		—
Member	Vacant		Senate		
Member	Vacant		Senate		
Member	Vacant		House of Representatives		
Member	Vacant		House of Representatives		
Member (ex officio)	Linda McMahon; Murray Bessette (Designee)	Republican	Secretary of Education	March 3, 2025	—

== James Madison Fellowships ==
Fellowship awards constitute the core of the Foundation's programs. The Foundation conducts an annual nationwide competition to select James Madison Fellows. Fellows are selected for their academic achievements and for their desire to be more knowledgeable secondary school teachers of social studies and American history and government. Fellows must have demonstrated an interest in pursuing a course of study which emphasizes the Constitution and Bill of Rights and a willingness to devote themselves to teaching and to civic responsibility. Applications are accepted online at the Foundation's website.

=== Selection ===
The Foundation selects at least one James Madison Fellow from each state, the District of Columbia, the U.S. Territories.

An independent review committee appointed by the Foundation evaluates all valid applications and recommends, to the Foundation for appointment as a James Madison Fellow, at least one outstanding applicant from each state. James Madison Fellowships are awarded to master's degree candidates as follows:

- Junior Fellowships to college seniors and graduates who wish to become secondary school teachers of American history, American government, or social studies for full-time graduate study toward a master's degree. Junior Fellows are eligible for up to two calendar years of support with a maximum stipend of $24,000 prorated over the period of study. In no case can the stipend exceed $12,000 for one year of study.
- Senior Fellowships to experienced secondary school teachers of American history, American government, or social studies for part-time graduate study during summers or in evening and weekend programs toward a master's degree. Senior Fellows are eligible for up to five calendar years of support with a maximum stipend of $24,000 prorated over the period of study.

=== Master's degree ===
Fellowship recipients may attend any accredited university in the United States with a master's degree program offering courses or training that emphasize the origins, principles, and development of the Constitution and its comparison with the constitutions and histories of other forms of government.

Fellows pursue a master's degree that permits a concentration of study in American history, American government, or social studies. The Foundation reviews each Fellow's proposed course of study for an appropriate balance of subject matter and other courses based on the Fellow's goals and background.

=== Teaching obligation ===
All James Madison Fellows must agree to teach full-time in secondary schools for at least one year for each year of assistance. If this requirement is not met, the recipient must reimburse the Foundation for all financial assistance plus interest. The Foundation strongly encourages Fellows to return to their home state to teach.

=== Summer Institute on the Constitution ===
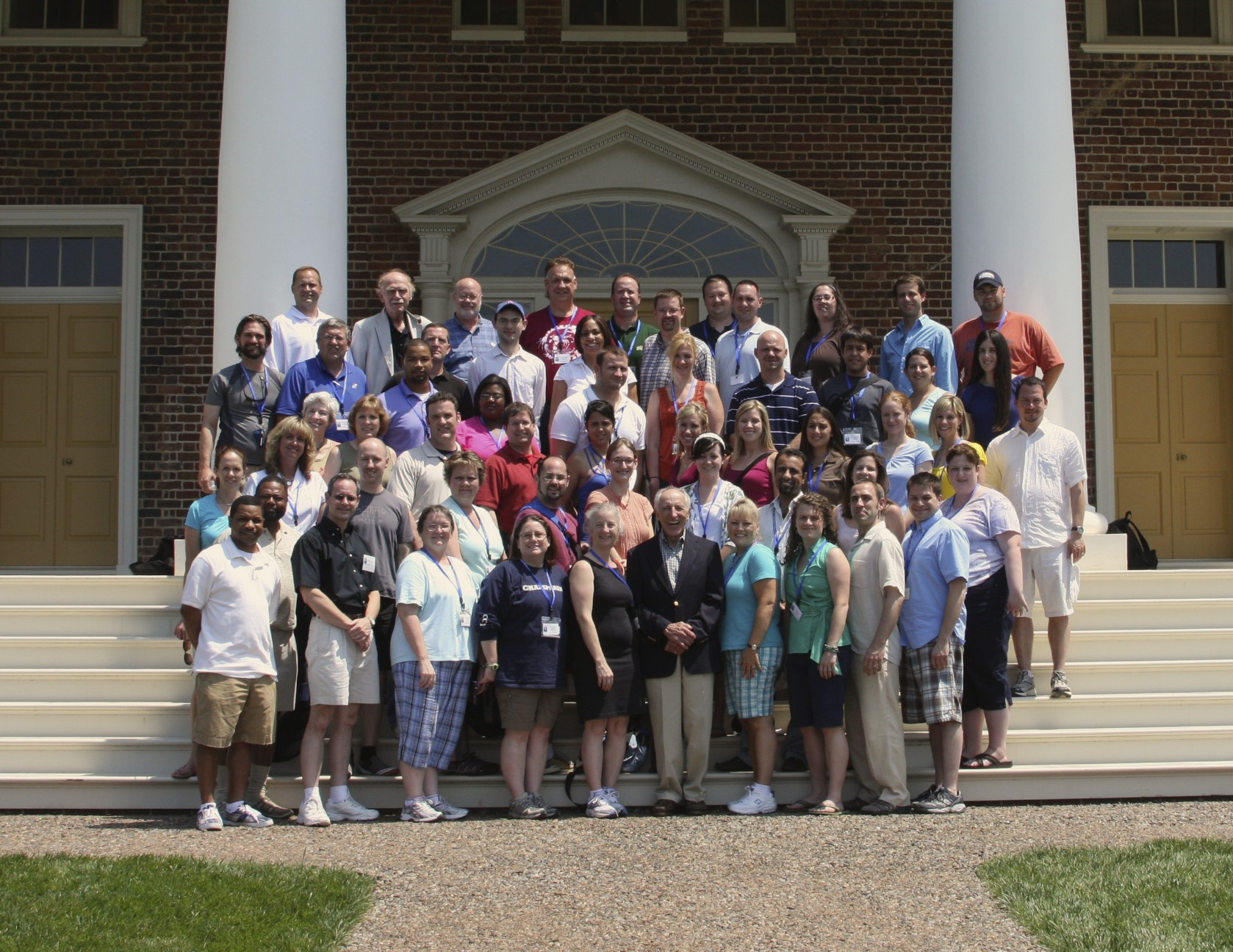
The Fellows take a variety of trips while in Washington, D.C.This is a group of James Madison Fellows on the steps of Montpelier.

James Madison Fellows as they tour Mt. Vernon.

James Madison Fellows are required to attend, at the Foundation's expense, a four-week institute in Washington, D.C., during the summer following their first academic year of study under a fellowship. The Institute provides an intensive educational experience focused on the Constitution. It offers the opportunity for both independent and directed study among the capital's unsurpassed resources in American history with some of the nation's leading scholars. In particular, the institute's program explores in depth the founding era of the Constitution, including those principles to which the framers were committed and upon which the Constitution is based, and the ratification process which produced The Federalist Papers, Anti-Federalist writings, and the Bill of Rights. The institute is held annually at Georgetown University, which awards six hours of graduate degree credit to each Fellow upon the successful completion of the institute.

== James Madison Education Fund, Inc. ==
The James Madison Memorial Fellowship Foundation is financially supported by the not-for-profit organization, "James Madison Education Fund, Inc."

== Sources ==
"Library of Congress". Archived from the original on April 16, 2001.

"Justia.com US Laws".

Public Law 99-591 Title VIII, Sect. 803 (PDF). October 30, 1986.
