= Distinguished Sea Service Award =

Annual award of the Naval Order of the US

The Distinguished Sea Service Award is an annual award of the Naval Order of the United States recognizing a recently retired flag or general office of the maritime services of the United States.

== History ==
In 1998, Captain John Brasel of the New York Commandery of the Naval Order of the United States proposed that the Order give an annual award "to recognize the exemplary service of a senior flag officer of one of the maritime services, who is finishing a continuous career of active service." The award is always made in a formal ceremony, preferably during the Naval Order's annual congress. Admiral William J. Crowe, Jr., was the first recipient in 1990.

== Recipients ==
- 1990 Admiral William J. Crowe, Jr., USN (Ret.)
- 1991 General Alfred M. Gray, Jr., USMC (Ret.)
- 1992 Admiral Paul A. Yost, Jr., USCG (Ret.)
- 1993 Admiral Carlisle A.H. Trost, USN (Ret.)
- 1994 Vice Admiral John H. Fetterman, Jr., USN (Ret.)
- 1995 Admiral David E. Jeremiah, USN (Ret.)
- 1996 General Walter E. Boomer, USMC (Ret.)
- 1997 Admiral Stanley R. Arthur, USN (Ret.)
- 1998 Admiral Leighton W. Smith, USN (Ret.)
- 1999 Admiral Robert E. Kramek, USCG (Ret.)
- 2000 Admiral Joseph W. Prueher, USN (Ret.)
- 2001 General Anthony C. Zinni, USMC (Ret.)
- 2002 Admiral Archie Clemins, USN (Ret.)
- 2003 Admiral James Loy, USCG (Ret.)
- 2004 Admiral Robert J. Natter, USN (Ret.)
- 2005 Admiral James O. Ellis, USN (Ret.)
- 2006 Admiral Vern Clark, USN (Ret.)
- 2007 Admiral Thomas Fargo, USN (Ret.)
- 2008 General James L. Jones, USMC (Ret.)
- 2009 Admiral William J. Fallon, USN (Ret.)
- 2010 General Peter Pace, USMC (Ret.)
- 2011 Admiral Thad W. Allen, USCG (Ret.)
- 2012 Admiral Michael Mullen, USN (Ret.)
- 2013 Admiral Timothy J. Keating, USN (Ret.)
- 2014 General James Mattis, USMC (Ret.)
- 2015 MCPON Rick West, USN (Ret.)
- 2015 Admiral James G. Stavridis, USN (Ret.)
- 2016 SMMC Micheal Barrett, USMC (Ret.)
- 2016 Admiral Robert J. Papp Jr., USCG (Ret.)
- 2017 MCPOCG Michael P. Leavitt, USCG (Ret.)
- 2017 Admiral Jonathan Greenert, USN (Ret.)
