= Tru Confessions (novel) =

1997 novel by Janet Tashjian

- First edition
- Author: Janet Tashjian
- Language: English
- Genre: Realistic fiction
- Publisher: Henry Holt and Co.
- Publication date: 1997
- Publication place: United States
- Media type: Print (hardback & paperback)
- Pages: 176
- ISBN: 9780590960472

Tru Confessions is the first novel by children’s book author Janet Tashjian. It was published by Henry Holt and Company; the paperback was published by Square Fish, an imprint of Macmillan. The novel is written in a format of a diary inputted on a computer, and uses lists and illustrations.

The novel has been translated into several languages, and was adapted into a 2002 Disney Channel Original Movie of the same name starring Clara Bryant and Shia LaBeouf.

== Plot ==
Trudy is a twelve-year-old girl who wants to have her own television show and "cure" her developmentally disabled brother Eddie.

== Reception and awards ==
The novel received positive reviews. Publishers Weekly in their starred review praises the truthful reflection of the experience of having a mentally-impaired sibling and unique digital diary format and states “Middle-graders will laugh their way through Tru’s poignant and clever take on everyday life”. Kirkus Reviews' review praised the characters and plot.

The novel was named a New York Public Library Book for the Teen Age, a Bank Street College of Education Best Children’s Book of the Year, and a Women's National Book Association Judy Lopez Memorial Honor Book. It won the Dolly Gray Children's Literature Award, and was nominated for the Massachusetts Children's Book Award on the Master List.
