= Tru Confessions =

- Film poster
- Based on: Tru Confessions by Janet Tashjian
- Written by: Stu Krieger
- Directed by: Paul Hoen
- Starring: Shia LaBeouf; Clara Bryant; William Francis McGuire; Mare Winningham
- Theme music composer: Mason Daring
- Country of origin: United States
- Original language: English

Production
- Producer: Kevin May
- Cinematography: Rudolf Blahacek
- Editor: Cindy Parisotto
- Running time: 81 minutes
- Production company: Chanticleer Films

Original release
- Network: Disney Channel
- Release: April 5, 2002

Tru Confessions is a 2002 American comedy drama film released as a Disney Channel Original Movie. It was directed by Paul Hoen and is based on the 1997 book by Janet Tashjian. Tru Walker (Clara Bryant) aspires to be a famous filmmaker. She has a twin brother Eddie (Shia LaBeouf), who is developmentally disabled due to oxygen deprivation at birth. Eddie becomes the subject of Tru's documentary for a film contest she enters.

== Plot ==
Trudy "Tru" Walker is a teenager who aspires to have her own TV show. Tru is somewhat unhappy with her life. Her twin brother, Eddie, has an unidentified learning disability caused from losing oxygen at birth and as a result, it causes him to act like a young child, which is often the source of chaos when in social situations. Although Eddie is affectionate, his behavior often frustrates Tru because she feels as if she is unable to reason with him. She is also angered by the harsh way her brother is treated by members of her peer group. Furthermore, she is often frustrated with her mother because it seems as if Eddie is the sibling who is favored. Although Tru feels sorry for Eddie, she is tired of being unable to pursue normal activities.

Tru is ecstatic when she hears about a video contest, the winner of which will get their own TV show. When Tru reveals this news to her mother, Tru is mildly disappointed at her mother's reaction because her mother does not appear to share her daughter's enthusiasm. Tru is at a loss in respect of what she should choose as the subject of her documentary. When her English teacher encourages her to select a topic which is meaningful to her, Tru decides to take her teacher's advice. With the documentary contest submission deadline looming, Tru is very anxious to come up with a suitable topic. When she screens her video, her friends find it boring and uninspiring. Tru then explores a subject which is personal to herself: she makes a video about her brother in which she highlights the positive influence that Eddie has had upon her life. She also reveals that living with a brother with a disability is often stressful and draining.

A sub-plot of the movie is Tru's relationship with her mother Judy. Another source of frustration in Tru's life is that she thinks her mother does not understand her. Thus, she seeks help on an online forum where she receives support from someone who refers to herself as Deedee. This on-line personality helps Tru through her tough times. Deedee convinces Tru that nothing great has ever been achieved without sacrifices and that she'll be rewarded for showing her true self. Later on in the film, after an argument between mother and daughter, Tru's mother repeats the advice that Deedee has given to Tru, leading Tru to reach the correct conclusion that Deedee is in fact Tru's mother. Once again, Tru becomes cross with her mother.

When the Walker family attends a street fair, Tru confronts her fears in respect of how cruel people can be towards people with disabilities. Tru notices that Eddie is wearing a new hat. When Tru asks him where he got the hat, Eddie points to a group of teenage boys. Tru reminds him that he should not accept anything from strangers. One of the group members is a boy from school that Tru likes by the name of Billy Meyer. It later transpires that the members of the group spat in the hat that Eddie was wearing. Tru is devastated and disgusted. When Billy tells her that she is a freak just like her brother, Tru pushes him off the bridge into a creek below. Tru decides not to reveal to her parents what happened, thinking that they won't understand (although she does tell her mother later on in vague detail).

Matters become more positive for Tru when she receives a letter telling her she won the contest, which means that her video will be broadcast on television. Tru worries that everyone at school will make fun of her because of the personal things about herself she revealed in the video. To make matters worse, Tru's father is caught up at work (he is a brain surgeon) and is not able to get home in time for her show. In the film, the relationship between father and son is strained because the former often lashes out verbally and is harsh towards the latter. Unknown to the family, Tru's father watches the show on a hospital television and is touched by what he sees. At school the next day, all of the students seem to have loved and appreciated Tru's show.

Later, Tru's father asks his daughter why he does not feature prominently in the film. She reluctantly shows him the footage of him she did have, which shows him in a bad light. Another theme of the film is the father's inability to relate properly to his son. Throughout the film, the father constantly snaps at Eddie and finds it difficult to be patient with him. Tru and Eddie understand that their father's job is stressful. Their father realizes he needs to be a better father to Eddie and that no one should live like that. So the video is a reminder to him of how to be better.

Tru comes to the saddening realization that as time passes she will live a normal life by going off to college, having a career, getting married and maybe having children of her own and Eddie will always be the same. Mr. Walker starts trying to make more time for the family and be more patient with Eddie. Tru and her mother endeavour to talk to each other and Tru insists that she will actually listen. Eddie and Tru sit down together to watch a soccer match they both played in. Eddie continuously rewinds to a play in which Tru passes the ball to Eddie and he makes a goal. Tru exclaims "Eddie, come on! We've watched this scene like ten times. Let's move on. It's not like it's going to change." Eddie replies "I like it. I don't want it to change. It's you and me. Being twins."

== Cast ==
- Shia LaBeouf as Eddie Walker
- Clara Bryant as Trudy Elizabeth "Tru" Walker
- William Francis McGuire as Dr. Bob Walker
- Mare Winningham as Ginny Walker
- Nicole Dicker as Denise Palumbo
- Kevin Duhaney as Jake
- Yani Gellman as Billy Meyer
- Craig Eldridge as Mr. Taylor
- Jennifer Foster as Judy "Deedee" Walker
- Rahnuma Panthaky as Ms. Hinchey
- Colm Magner as Coach Rice
- Arnold Pinnock as Dr. Dean Cutler

== Production ==
Most of the film was shot in Toronto, Ontario, Canada. In one of the scenes, when the children exit the ferry, the shot shows the CN Tower and other major buildings in Toronto. The school scenes were filmed at Danforth Collegiate and Technical Institute, which is located in Toronto.
