= Paul A. Yost Jr. =

Commandant of the United States Coast Guard (1929–2022)

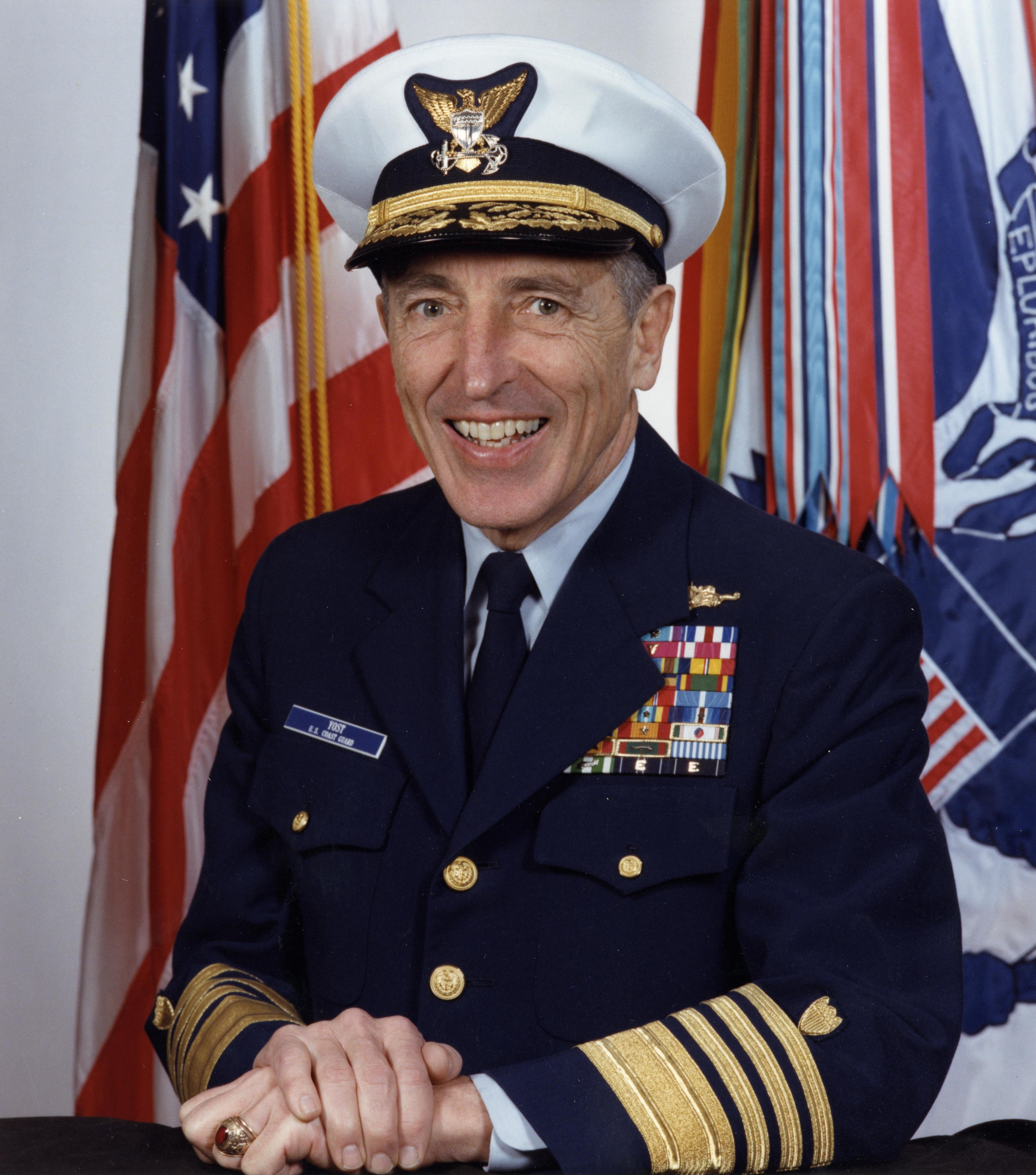
- Born: January 3, 1929; St. Petersburg, Florida, U.S.
- Died: February 9, 2022 (aged 93); Provo, Utah, U.S.
- Military career
- Branch: United States Coast Guard
- Rank: Admiral
- Commands: Commandant of the Coast Guard
- Conflicts: Vietnam War; Korean War
- Other work: President, James Madison Memorial Fellowship Foundation (1990-2010)

Paul Alexander Yost Jr. (January 3, 1929 – February 9, 2022) was an admiral of the United States Coast Guard who served as the 18th commandant from 1986 to 1990.

== Early life and career ==
Yost was a native of St. Petersburg, Florida. He graduated from the United States Coast Guard Academy at New London, Connecticut, in 1951, and earned graduate degrees from the University of Connecticut and The George Washington University. In 1966 Yost assumed command of USCGC Resolute which was home-ported at San Francisco, California. He was Commander, Task Group 115.3, a combat command in 1969 supporting Operation Market Time during the Vietnam War, He was promoted to flag rank in 1978 and served three years as Commander, Eighth Coast Guard District in New Orleans, Louisiana. He later served concurrently as Commander, Atlantic Area Maritime Defense Zone and as Commander, Third Coast Guard District, accepting those appointments in 1984. Prior to assuming those command posts, he served as Chief of Staff at Coast Guard Headquarters.

== Tenure as Commandant ==
Yost was responsible for eliminating the longstanding tradition of beards at sea. He was also known for driving the Coast Guard toward a robust coastal defense mission, and a parallel initiative to dramatically increase the armament aboard Coast Guard cutters. Prior to his tenure Coast Guard cutters were outfitted with weapons systems designed to fight the war on drugs, and other law enforcement related missions. He added naval warfare systems to larger cutters, which included the Harpoon missile system, close-in weapon systems (CIWS), and other similar upgrades. Following his retirement, the Harpoon missile systems were removed and the coastal defense mission was de-emphasised in favor of the more traditional missions of search and rescue, law enforcement, marine safety and aids to navigation. Yost's focus on the coastal defense mission was often derided by Coast Guardsmen and Congress alike who referred to his era as the "Yost-Guard."

== Retirement and death ==
Following his retirement from the Coast Guard in 1990, Yost served as President of the Alexandria, Virginia-based James Madison Memorial Fellowship Foundation until 2010. He was a member of the Church of Jesus Christ of Latter-day Saints, and had served on the church's Military Relations Committee.

Following his retirement from the Coast Guard, he received the Naval Order of the United States Distinguished Sea Service Award in 1992. Yost died February 9, 2022, in Provo, Utah.

Military offices
| Preceded by James S. Gracey | Commandant of the Coast Guard; 1986—1990 | Succeeded by J. William Kime |
