= My Life as a Book =

Children's novel by Janet Tashjian

- First edition
- Author: Janet Tashjian
- Illustrator: Jake Tashjian
- Language: English
- Series: My Life
- Genre: Realistic fiction, comedy
- Publisher: Henry Holt and Co (hardback); Square Fish (paperback)
- Publication date: July 6, 2010
- Publication place: United States
- Pages: 224
- ISBN: 9780805089035
- Followed by: My Life as a Stuntboy

My Life as a Book is a children's novel written by Janet Tashjian and illustrated by her teenage son, Jake Tashjian. It is the first book in the My Life series. It has been translated into ten languages including Spanish, Catalan, Hebrew, Turkish, Czech, and German. Its sequels-My Life as a Stuntboy and My Life as a Cartoonist - have also been translated into several languages.

The novel tells the story of Derek Fallon, a mischievous twelve-year-old boy who finds reading difficult because of his reading disability. As a way to learn his vocabulary words, he illustrates them in the margins of a book his mom got him. When he discovers a newspaper in the attic with the story of a girl who drowned on Martha's Vineyard, he spends his summer trying to uncover the mystery of what happened instead of completing his summer reading list.

== Background ==
Tashjian wanted to write a book for reluctant readers with the humor and visual support of a Calvin and Hobbes book, even dedicating the novel to its creator Bill Watterson. She incorporated the methods of several reading programs into the novels such as Lindamood Bell's ‘Visualizing and Verbalizing’ and Maryanne Wolf’s ‘Rave-O.’

== Books in the Series ==
The series has a total of 10 books.

1. My Life as a Book (2010)
2. My Life as a Stuntboy (2011)
3. My Life as a Cartoonist (2013)
4. My Life as a Joke (2014)
5. My Life as a Gamer (2015)
6. My Life as a Ninja (2017)
7. My Life as a Youtuber (2018)
8. My Life as a Meme (2019)
9. My Life as a Coder (2020)
10. My Life as a Billionaire (2021)
