= The Gospel According to Larry =

2001 novel by Janet Tashjian

- First edition
- Author: Janet Tashjian
- Cover artist: Liney Li
- Language: English
- Series: Larry
- Genre: Comedy, coming-of-age, social, romance
- Publisher: Henry Holt and Co.
- Publication date: October 1, 2001
- Publication place: United States
- Media type: Print (Hardback & Paperback)
- Pages: 227
- ISBN: 9780141318349
- Followed by: Vote for Larry

The Gospel According to Larry is a coming-of-age young adult novel by Janet Tashjian. The novel focuses on Josh Swenson, a teenager who preaches his anti-consumerism beliefs under his online pseudonym of "Larry" and must deal with the sudden popularity of his web presence.

The sequel Vote for Larry was published on May 1, 2004. The third book in the Larry series, Larry and the Meaning of Life, was published on September 16, 2008.

== Plot summary ==
Seventeen-year-old Josh Swenson, an articulate teen whose dream is to change the world, creates his own website which he calls "The Gospel According to Larry" because Larry was the most unbiblical name he could think of. He writes articles on this site preaching his feelings and ideas about making the world a better place.

He is unpopular until someone writes an article about him in a local newspaper and the number of hits begins to grow. He then decides to start photographing and posting his possessions. He was curious to see if it was possible to track down someone anywhere in the world simply by their possessions. He only has 75 possessions and has a list of guidelines to keep track of how many possessions he has, such as to sell or trade an old CD, book, or video whenever he wants a new one. The guidelines were inspired by his reading of a book about Native Americans who did not want to leave a "footprint" behind, which led him to believe every purchase is a major decision.

Not everyone is happy with his site. A poster of the screen name betagold despises that Josh has kept his identity online as a secret behind and threatens to find him, no matter what he does to hide. She even notices minor clues to his location that he speaks of that.

U2's lead singer Bono takes an interest in the site, causing even more publicity. He decides to host a giant rock festival called Larryfest where all of the bands would play for free and all companies would sell food and drink at cost.

After the festival, Josh is at home when an older woman knocks on his door, who reveals to be Tracy Hawthorne, the person behind betagold. She is surrounded by reporters wanting to get a photograph of "Larry." With his real identity exposed to the public eye, he is initially glad because then he can spread his anti-consumerism message to all those who do not have access to the Internet. He quickly realizes that reporters are not interested in his message, but in his life, family, and friends.

Josh likes to pretend to talk to his deceased mother at the makeup desk at Bloomingdale's. His mother would go there once a month to buy makeup and talk to the woman who worked there. To do so, Josh sits on a chair, says something, waits for the next voice he hears, and accepts whatever they say as his mother's answer.

Josh becomes really depressed that he cannot leave his house without being harassed by reporters and attempts to receive an answer from "his mother". He is very confused and does not know where to go from there. He hears a woman speak of suicidal statements and then considers suicide as the only way to escape his state.

He bikes to the Sagamore Bridge because he has heard stories of how people had jumped from there and then returns home pretty shaken up. The next day, while being bored and looking up Greek and Latin roots, he puts two roots together and comes up with the word "pseudocide" (pseudo-, "false" and -cide, "killing") to refer pretending to kill oneself. He starts planning his faked suicide. Although unsure of whether to go through the plan, he considers it his project and does everything necessary for it to occur.

On the day to execute the plan, he cuts and dyes his hair and rides his bike to the Sagamore Bridge. After seeing no one around, he throws his clothes over and tucks his pants into his bag so that he is wearing shorts. He waves to a passing car and tells them he was running past and saw a kid jump, describing his previous look. When they see his bike is registered, Josh freaks out to the point he throws up. He leaves and stays at a small motel where he watches the local news revealing the entirety of the incident. He does not want any doubt that it was a suicide.

== Reception and awards ==
- A BookSense Pick
- A Best Book for Young Adults
- A New York Public Library Best Book for the Teen Age
- A Notable Trade Book in the Field of Social Studies
- A Bank Street College of Education Best Children's Book
- Four starred reviews from Kirkus Reviews, School Library Journal, Booklist, and Horn Book.

"A thrilling read, fast-paced with much fast food for thought about our consumer-oriented culture...The voice is clear, the ending satisfying. Teenagers will eat this one up." Kirkus – Starred Review

"Tashjian's gift for portraying bright adolescents with insight and humor reaches near perfection here...A terrific read with a credible and lovable main character." School Library Journal – Starred Review

"Tashjian does something very fresh here, which will hit teens at a visceral level. She takes the natural idealism young people feel, personalizes it in the character of Josh/Larry, and shows that idealism transformed by unintended consequences. The book's frank discussion about topics paramount to kids--celebrity worship, consumerism, and the way multinational corporations shape our lives--is immediate, insightful, and made even more vivid because it's wrapped in the mystery of Larry." – Booklist – Starred Review
