= Janet Tashjian =

American writer (born 1956)

- Born: 1956 (age 69–70); Providence, Rhode Island, U.S.
- Occupation: Writer
- Writing career
- Genres: Children's literature, young adult literature
- Website: www.janettashjian.com

Janet Tashjian (born 1956) is an American writer living in Los Angeles. Her children's and young adult fiction is published by Henry Holt and Company. Her books often incorporate different formats and play with the line between fiction and nonfiction. She is the mother of Jake Tashjian, who illustrated her My Life and Einstein the Class Hamster series.

== Books ==
=== Stand-alone fiction ===
- 1997: Tru Confessions (which was adapted for a 2002 Disney Channel Original Movie: Tru Confessions)
- 1999: Multiple Choice
- 1999: Felicity: Summer
- 2003: Fault Line
- 2012: For What It's Worth

=== Larry series ===
- 2001: The Gospel According to Larry
- 2004: Vote for Larry
- 2008: Larry and the Meaning of Life

=== My Life series ===
- 2010: My Life as a Book
- 2011: My Life as a Stuntboy
- 2013: My Life as a Cartoonist
- 2014: My Life as a Joke
- 2015: My Life as a Gamer
- 2017: My Life as a Ninja
- 2018: My Life as a YouTuber
- 2019: My Life as a Meme
- 2020: My Life as a Coder
- 2021: My Life as a Billionaire

=== Einstein the Class Hamster series ===
- 2013: Einstein the Class Hamster
- 2014: Einstein the Class Hamster and the Very Real Game Show
- 2015: Einstein the Class Hamster Saves the Library

=== Sticker Girl series ===
- 2016: Sticker Girl
- 2017: Sticker Girl Rules the School
- 2018: Sticker Girl and the Cupcake Challenge

=== Marty Frye, Private Eye series ===
- 2017: Marty Frye, Private Eye
- 2017: Marty Frye, Private Eye: The Case of the Stolen Poodle
- 2018: Marty Frye, Private Eye: The Case of the Busted Video Games

== Adaptations ==
Tashjian's works have been translated into several languages. Her novel Tru Confessions was adapted into a 2002 Disney Channel Original Movie starring Clara Bryant and Shia LaBeouf.
