= USCGC Mariposa =

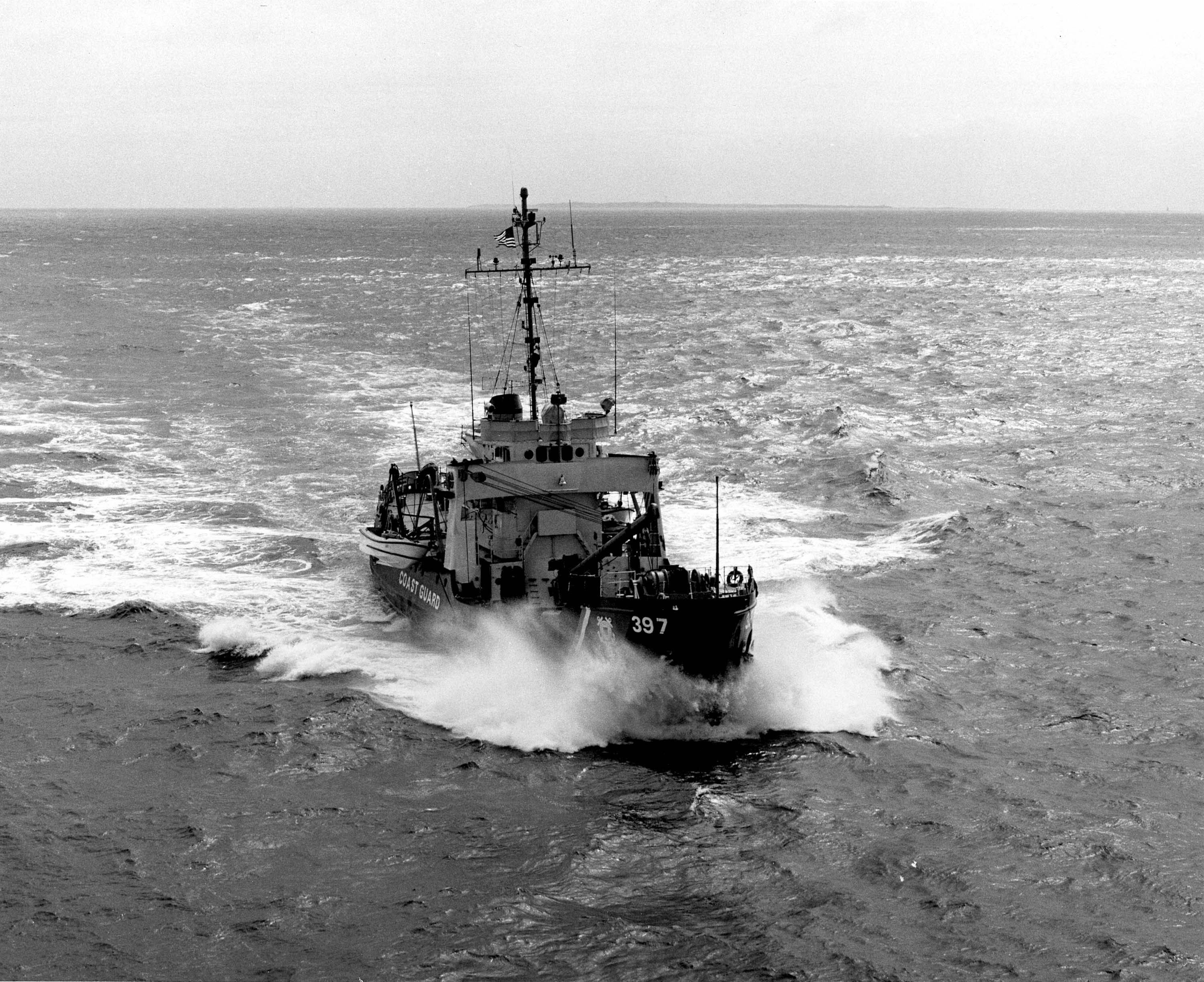
- USCGC Mariposa underway in 1971.

History

United States
- Name: Mariposa
- Namesake: Mariposa plant
- Builder: Zenith Dredge Corporation
- Laid down: 25 October 1943
- Launched: 14 January 1944
- Commissioned: 1 July 1944
- Decommissioned: 7 March 2000
- Fate: Transferred to U.S. Navy as training hulk, 17 April 2000

General characteristics
- Class & type: Iris-class buoy tender
- Displacement: 935 long tons (950 t)
- Length: 180 ft (55 m)
- Beam: 47 ft 1 in (14.35 m)
- Draft: 12 ft (3.7 m)
- Propulsion: 1 × electric motor connected to 2 Westinghouse generators driven by 2 Cooper Bessemer-type GND-8, 4-cycle diesels; single screw
- Speed: 8.3 kn (15.4 km/h; 9.6 mph) cruising; 13 kn (24 km/h; 15 mph) maximum
- Complement: 6 officers; 74 enlisted
- Armament: 1 × 3 inch gun; 2 × 20 mm/80; 2 × depth charge tracks; 2 × Mousetraps; 4 × Y-guns

USCGC Mariposa (WLB-397) was an Iris-class buoy tender belonging to the United States Coast Guard launched on 14 January 1944 and commissioned on 1 July 1944.

== Design ==
The Iris-class buoy tenders were constructed after the Mesquite class. Mariposa cost $926,446 to construct and had an overall length of 180 feet (55 m). She had a beam of 37 feet (11 m) and a draft of up to 12 feet (3.7 m) at the time of construction, although this was increased to 14 feet 7 inches (4.45 m) in 1966. She initially had a displacement of 935 long tons (950 t; 1,047 short tons); this was increased to 1,026 long tons (1,042 t; 1,149 short tons) in 1966. She was powered by one electric motor. This was connected up to two Westinghouse generators which were driven by two CooperBessemer GND-8 four-cycle diesel engines. She had a single screw.

The Iris-class buoy tenders had maximum sustained speeds of 13 knots (24 km/h; 15 mph), although this diminished to around 11.9 knots (22.0 km/h; 13.7 mph) in 1966. For economic and effective operation, they had to initially operate at 8.3 knots (15.4 km/h; 9.6 mph), although this increased to 8.5 knots (15.7 km/h; 9.8 mph) in 1966. The ships had a complement of six officers and seventy-four crew members in 1945; this decreased to two warrants, four officers, and forty-seven men in 1966. They were fitted with a SL1 radar system and QBE-3A sonar system in 1945. Their armament consisted of one 3-inch/50-caliber gun, two 20 mm/80 guns, two Mousetraps, two depth charge tracks, and four Y-guns in 1945; these were removed in 1966.

== Career ==
International radio call sign of USCGC Mariposa (WLB-397)
November	Oscar	Delta	Papa

Upon receiving her commission Mariposa was assigned to the 3rd Coast Guard District and homeported at Staten Island where she was used for general ATON until the end of World War II. After the end of the war, she stayed in Staten Island. In 1990, she underwent a major renovation and from June 1991, until being decommissioned, she was stationed at Seattle. In 2000, she was transferred to the U.S. Navy for use as a training hulk.

== See also ==
- List of United States Coast Guard cutters
