= Michael John Straub =

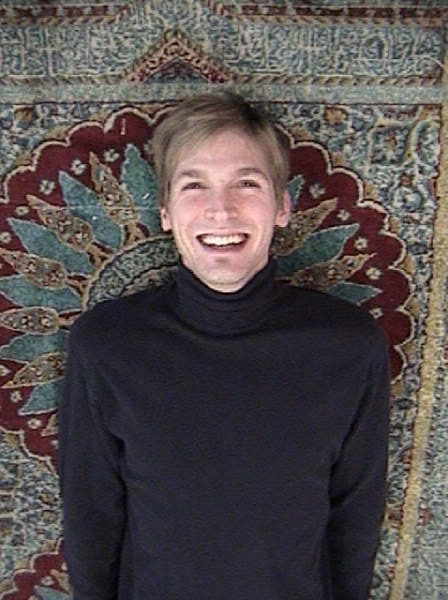
Michael J Straub

Michael John Straub (September 23, 1970 – February 23, 2004) was an artist and printmaker. Originally from Clifton Park, New York 1979–1989 and Amherst, New Hampshire 1971–1979, a 1989 graduate of Shenendehowa High School, he studied at and earned a bachelor's degree from Buffalo State College. He was born in Newton, Massachusetts. Straub created hundreds of unique paintings and thousands of prints and lithographs using a variety of techniques, including abstract and pop art, which he showed at various art museums and galleries in the upstate New York area, including the Albright Knox Art Gallery, as well as several art festivals each year, including Buffalo's Allentown and Elmwood art festivals. Working in the disciplines of woodcut, intaglio, monoprints and lithography, his images often draw comparisons with the semiautomatic techniques and hieroglyphs of Paul Klee, Adolph Gottlieb and Keith Haring. Straub's work reflects his concern with the "parodoxical relationship" inherent in creating spontaneous imagery derived from both the physical and spiritual planes. Straub was a resident artist at The Buffalo Arts Studio. Buffalo's bookstores, coffee shops, restaurants, and streets are still filled with his murals, sketches, and graffiti. Straub was also an avid skateboarder, photographer, musician, and poet. Straub's drumming, washboard and jaw harp can be heard on tracks 2 and 7 of Ould Pound's 1998 release "Sounds of the Elma Flatlands". He moved to San Diego, California in December 2002, where he spent the last year and a half of his life. Straub died unexpectedly of heart failure at the age of 33 brought on by an asthma attack on February 23, 2004, in Kaiser Permanente Medical Center located in the Los Feliz neighborhood of Los Angeles, California.
