= List of Buffy the Vampire Slayer home video releases =

The Chosen Collection (Seasons 1–7); Region 1, 2005 packaging

DVDs of the television show Buffy the Vampire Slayer were produced by 20th Century Fox and released beginning in 2000. As well as containing the episodes, the DVD sets have extra features such as: audio commentaries by the show's producers, documentary features, blooper reels, and shooting scripts.

== Release dates ==
DVD	Release date		
DVD	Region 1	Region 2	Region 4
The Complete First Season	January 15, 2002	November 27, 2000	November 20, 2000
The Complete Second Season	June 11, 2002	May 21, 2001	June 15, 2001
The Complete Third Season	January 7, 2003	October 29, 2001	November 22, 2001
The Complete Fourth Season	June 10, 2003	May 13, 2002	May 20, 2002
The Complete Fifth Season	December 9, 2003	October 28, 2002	November 29, 2002
The Complete Sixth Season	May 25, 2004	May 12, 2003	April 20, 2003
The Complete Seventh Season	November 16, 2004	April 5, 2004	May 15, 2004

== Differences between versions ==
The Buffy the Vampire Slayer DVD sets were released in at least three encoding formats:

- Region 1 (United States and Canada), in NTSC format
- Region 2 (Europe), in PAL format
- Region 4 (Australia and New Zealand), in PAL format

Aside from the region encoding (and the packaging), the Region 2 and Region 4 DVDs are identical. However, there are several content differences between the Region 1 DVDs and the Region 2 and 4 DVDs.

=== Scenes from previous episodes ===
The Region 2 and 4 DVDs include the scenes from previous episodes ("Previously on Buffy the Vampire Slayer") at the beginning of each episode (except season 2); the Region 1 DVDs do not.

This even applies to the final episode of season five, "The Gift", in which the "previously" scenes are a montage leading into the episode itself. This montage was deleted from "The Gift" on the Region 1 DVDs. This montage was later included as an easter egg on the Season 7 DVD set, even in Region 2 and 4.

=== Widescreen ===
The series aired in a 4:3 aspect ratio for all seven seasons in the United States, with the exception of "Once More, with Feeling" which was aired in widescreen. While the first three seasons were shot exclusively in 4:3, beginning with the fourth season the series was shot with a 16:9 safe area, though according to Joss Whedon the series was intended to be shown in a 4:3 ratio, stating "Adding space to the sides simply for the sake of trying to look more cinematic would betray the very exact mise-en-scene I was trying to create. I am a purist, and this is the purest way to watch Buffy. I have resisted the effort to letterbox Buffy from the start and always will, because that is not the show we shot." The extra material in the widescreen versions is never important for the plot, although it gives additional views of the sets and backgrounds.

Beginning in season four, the Region 2 and 4 DVDs include an open matte 16:9 version of the television show. The Region 1 DVDs include the standard format (4:3) version.

The reason for this difference is that the Region 2 and 4 DVDs were released before the Region 1 DVDs, with less involvement from Mutant Enemy Productions. When the Region 1 DVDs were released, Joss Whedon decided that they should not have the widescreen version.

In 2011 Netflix began streaming seasons 4–7 in the 16:9 ratio, but would ultimately revert to the 4:3 ratio. In Nordic Region 2 countries Netflix streams those seasons in 4:3 ratio, despite the local DVDs being in widescreen.

As of August 4, 2016, Netflix began streaming all seven seasons in an updated HD version, replacing the original broadcast version. This version of the series is a remaster of the series in HD produced by the studio 20th Century Fox against the wishes of original production team. Many of the original production team, including Whedon himself, and fans have criticized the HD remaster for poor transferring of standard definition to high definition, the poor transition from 4:3 aspect ratio to 16:9 aspect ratio, improper lighting, lack of lens filtering and poorly redone special effects that were either upscaled or redone in HD not true to the original. For season 1, each episode up to episode 8 had to be cropped, leaving everything in frame looking zoomed. Season 1, episode 7 has a few scenes fixed so they are using more of the frame. In other instances the 16:9 aspect ratio shows goofs in frame like crew members or filming equipment on screen. 20th Century Fox originally released the HD remaster as a syndicated broadcast on the network Pivot. Currently the HD remaster is not available for purchase on home media.

=== 4% speed difference ===
The Region 2 and 4 DVDs play the episodes at 4% faster than the Region 1 DVDs. This reduces the running time of each episode by about two minutes (not counting the "scenes from previous episodes"). It also causes the sound to be raised by two-thirds of a semitone. For example, a C note is raised to a note two-thirds of the way from C to C♯.

The speeds of the different region DVDs match the speeds used during the original television broadcasts in the respective countries. Thus the Region 1 DVD plays the video at the same speed as the American broadcasts (which is the speed at which the show was filmed), while the Region 2 and 4 DVDs plays the video at the slightly faster speed that was used during the original British broadcasts. This effect is not particular to the Buffy DVDs but affects all television shows, because film that uses 23.976 frames per second is sped up for PAL that uses 25 (in the 30fps NTSC standard it is subject to 3:2 pulldown and there is no speed variation). But since the signal from a DVD player is ultimately analog, the Region 2 and 4 DVDs will still play at the faster speed when played on an American television with a multi-region DVD.

In Brazil the standard color system is not PAL, but PAL-M which is also 24 frames per second. In addition to that, all DVD releases, despite being Region 4 are in NTSC, so the frame rate is also 24 frames per second.

=== Subtitles ===
In the Region 2 and 4 releases, episodes with commentaries include two English subtitles: the show itself, and the commentary. The Region 1 releases do not offer subtitles for the commentaries.

The Region 1 DVDs also offer a smaller choice of non-English languages subtitles than the Region 2 and 4 DVDs.

== Season 1 ==
=== Disc 1 ===
==== Episodes ====
- Episode 1: "Welcome to the Hellmouth"
- Episode 2: "The Harvest"
- Episode 3: "Witch"
- Episode 4: "Teacher's Pet"

==== Special features ====
- Interview with Joss Whedon and David Boreanaz
- Interview with Joss Whedon on "Welcome To The Hellmouth" & "The Harvest" (Region 1 Only)
- Commentary on "Welcome to the Hellmouth" and "The Harvest" by creator Joss Whedon
- Original pilot episode script "Welcome To The Hellmouth" & "The Harvest"
- Buffy trailer
- DVD-ROM content, screensavers and Buffy weblinks

=== Disc 2 ===
==== Episodes ====
- Episode 5: "Never Kill a Boy on the First Date"
- Episode 6: "The Pack"
- Episode 7: "Angel"
- Episode 8: "I, Robot... You, Jane"

==== Special features ====
- "I Quit" music video (absent in Region 1 release)
- Interview with Joss Whedon on "Witch" & "Never Kill A Boy on the First Date" (Region 1 only)
- Photo gallery

=== Disc 3 ===
==== Episodes ====
- Episode 9: "The Puppet Show"
- Episode 10: "Nightmares"
- Episode 11: "Out of Mind, Out of Sight"
- Episode 12: "Prophecy Girl"

==== Special features ====
- Interview with Joss Whedon on "Angel" & "The Puppet Show" (Region 1 only)
- Cast biographies

== Season 2 ==
=== Disc 1 ===
==== Episodes ====
- Episode 1: "When She Was Bad"
- Episode 2: "Some Assembly Required"
- Episode 3: "School Hard"
- Episode 4: "Inca Mummy Girl"

=== Disc 2 ===
==== Episodes ====
- Episode 5: "Reptile Boy"
- Episode 6: "Halloween"
- Episode 7: "Lie to Me"
- Episode 8: "The Dark Age"

==== Special features ====
- Commentary on "Reptile Boy" by writer/director David Greenwalt
- Script for "Reptile Boy"

=== Disc 3 ===
==== Episodes ====
- Episode 9: "What's My Line? - Part 1"
- Episode 10: "What's My Line? - Part 2"
- Episode 11: "Ted"
- Episode 12: "Bad Eggs"

==== Special features ====
- Commentary on "What's My Line, Parts One and Two" by co-writer Marti Noxon
- Script for "What's My Line, Parts One and Two"

=== Disc 4 ===
==== Episodes ====
- Episode 13: "Surprise"
- Episode 14: "Innocence"
- Episode 15: "Phases"
- Episode 16: "Bewitched, Bothered and Bewildered"

==== Special features ====
- Commentary on "Innocence" by writer/director Joss Whedon
- Script for "Innocence"
- Interview with creator Joss Whedon on "Surprise" and "Innocence" (Region 1 only)

=== Disc 5 ===
==== Episodes ====
- Episode 17: "Passion"
- Episode 18: "Killed by Death"
- Episode 19: "I Only Have Eyes for You"
- Episode 20: "Go Fish"

==== Special features ====
- Interview with creator Joss Whedon on "Passion" and "I Only Have Eyes for You" (Region 1 only)

=== Disc 6 ===
==== Episodes ====
- Episode 21: "Becoming - Part 1"
- Episode 22: "Becoming - Part 2"

==== Special features ====
- "Designing Buffy" featurette
- "A Buffy Bestiary" featurette
- "Beauty and the Beasts" featurette
- Interview with creator Joss Whedon on "Becoming, Parts One and Two" (Region 1 only)
- Trailers (UK TV spots, U.S. TV spots, Season 2 DVD trailers)
- Cast biographies
- Stills/photos (set designs, monsters, additional photos)

== Season 3 ==
=== Disc 1 ===
==== Episodes ====
- Episode 1: "Anne"
- Episode 2: "Dead Man's Party"
- Episode 3: "Faith, Hope & Trick"
- Episode 4: "Beauty and the Beasts"

==== Special features ====
- Script for "Faith, Hope & Trick"

=== Disc 2 ===
==== Episodes ====
- Episode 5: "Homecoming"
- Episode 6: "Band Candy"
- Episode 7: "Revelations"
- Episode 8: "Lovers Walk"

==== Special features ====
- Script for "Band Candy"
- Script for "Lovers Walk"

=== Disc 3 ===
==== Episodes ====
- Episode 9: "The Wish"
- Episode 10: "Amends"
- Episode 11: "Gingerbread"

==== Special features ====
- Script for "The Wish"
- "Season 3 Overview" featurette
- "Buffy Speak" featurette
- Photo stills gallery
- Cast biographies (non Region 1)

=== Disc 4 ===
==== Episodes ====
- Episode 12: "Helpless"
- Episode 13: "The Zeppo"
- Episode 14: "Bad Girls"
- Episode 15: "Consequences"

==== Special features ====
- Commentary on "Helpless" by writer David Fury
- Commentary on "Bad Girls" by writer Doug Petrie
- Commentary on "Consequences" by director Michael Gershman
- Interview with creator Joss Whedon on "Bad Girls" and "Consequences" (Region 1 only)

=== Disc 5 ===
==== Episodes ====
- Episode 16: "Doppelgangland"
- Episode 17: "Enemies"
- Episode 18: "Earshot"
- Episode 19: "Choices"

==== Special features ====
- Commentary on "Earshot" by writer Jane Espenson
- Interview with Joss Whedon, Jane Espenson, and Doug Petrie on "Enemies" and "Earshot" (Region 1 only)

=== Disc 6 ===
==== Episodes ====
- Episode 20: "The Prom"
- Episode 21: "Graduation Day - Part 1"
- Episode 22: "Graduation Day - Part 2"

==== Special features ====
- "Special Effects" featurette
- "Weapons" featurette
- "Wardrobe" featurette
- Interview with Joss Whedon on "Graduation Day" (Region 1 only)

== Season 4 ==
=== Disc 1 ===
==== Episodes ====
- Episode 1: "The Freshman"
- Episode 2: "Living Conditions"
- Episode 3: "The Harsh Light of Day"
- Episode 4: "Fear, Itself"

==== Special features ====
- Script for "Fear, Itself"

=== Disc 2 ===
==== Episodes ====
- Episode 5: "Beer Bad"
- Episode 6: "Wild at Heart"
- Episode 7: "The Initiative"
- Episode 8: "Pangs"

==== Special features ====
- Commentary on "Wild at Heart" by creator Joss Whedon, writer Marti Noxon and actor Seth Green (Region 1 only)
- Commentary on "The Initiative" by writer Doug Petrie

=== Disc 3 ===
==== Episodes ====
- Episode 9: "Something Blue"
- Episode 10: "Hush"
- Episode 11: "Doomed"

==== Special features ====
- Commentary on "Hush" by writer/director Joss Whedon
- Script for "Hush"
- "Spike Me" featurette
- "Oz Revelations: A Full Moon" featurette (Region 1 only)
- "Buffy, Inside Sets of Sunnydale" featurette
- "Buffy, Inside the Music" featurette
- "Hush" featurette
- Cast biographies

=== Disc 4 ===
==== Episodes ====
- Episode 12: "A New Man"
- Episode 13: "The I in Team"
- Episode 14: "Goodbye Iowa"
- Episode 15: "This Year's Girl"

==== Special features ====
- Commentary on "This Year's Girl" by writer Doug Petrie

=== Disc 5 ===
==== Episodes ====
- Episode 16: "Who Are You?"
- Episode 17: "Superstar"
- Episode 18: "Where the Wild Things Are"
- Episode 19: "New Moon Rising"

==== Special features ====
- Script for "Who Are You?"
- Commentary on "Superstar" by writer Jane Espenson

=== Disc 6 ===
==== Episodes ====
- Episode 20: "The Yoko Factor"
- Episode 21: "Primeval"
- Episode 22: "Restless"

==== Special features ====
- Commentary on "Primeval" by writer David Fury and director James A. Contner
- Commentary on "Restless" by writer/director Joss Whedon
- Script for "Restless"
- "Season 4 Overview" featurette
- Still gallery

== Season 5 ==
=== Disc 1 ===
==== Episodes ====
- Episode 1: "Buffy vs. Dracula"
- Episode 2: "Real Me"
- Episode 3: "The Replacement"
- Episode 4: "Out of My Mind"

==== Special features ====
- Commentary on "Real Me" by writer David Fury and director David Grossman
- Script for "The Replacement"

=== Disc 2 ===
==== Episodes ====
- Episode 5: "No Place Like Home"
- Episode 6: "Family"
- Episode 7: "Fool for Love"
- Episode 8: "Shadow"

==== Special features ====
- Commentary on "Fool for Love" by writer Doug Petrie
- Script for "Fool For Love"

=== Disc 3 ===
==== Episodes ====
- Episode 9: "Listening to Fear"
- Episode 10: "Into the Woods"
- Episode 11: "Triangle"

==== Special features ====
- Script for "Into the Woods"
- "Buffy Abroad" featurette
- "Demonology: A Slayer's Guide" featurette
- "Casting Buffy" featurette
- "Action Heroes!: The Stunts of Buffy" featurette
- Buffy series outtakes

=== Disc 4 ===
==== Episodes ====
- Episode 12: "Checkpoint"
- Episode 13: "Blood Ties"
- Episode 14: "Crush"
- Episode 15: "I Was Made to Love You"

==== Special features ====
- Script for "Checkpoint"
- Commentary on "I Was Made to Love You" by writer Jane Espenson

=== Disc 5 ===
==== Episodes ====
- Episode 16: "The Body"
- Episode 17: "Forever"
- Episode 18: "Intervention"
- Episode 19: "Tough Love"

==== Special features ====
- Commentary on "The Body" by writer/director Joss Whedon

=== Disc 6 ===
==== Episodes ====
- Episode 20: "Spiral"
- Episode 21: "The Weight of the World"
- Episode 22: "The Gift"

==== Special features ====
- "The Story of Season 5" featurette
- "Natural Causes" featurette
- "Spotlight on Dawn" featurette
- Still gallery
- Buffy videogame trailer
- DVD-ROM Buffy demon guide

== Season 6 ==
=== Disc 1 ===
==== Episodes ====
- Episodes 1 & 2: "Bargaining - Parts 1 & 2"
- Episode 3: "After Life"
- Episode 4: "Flooded"

==== Special features ====
- Commentary on "Bargaining, Parts One and Two" by writers Marti Noxon and David Fury

=== Disc 2 ===
==== Episodes ====
- Episode 5: "Life Serial"
- Episode 6: "All the Way"
- Episode 7: "Once More, with Feeling"
- Episode 8: "Tabula Rasa"

==== Special features ====
- Commentary on "Once More, with Feeling" by writer/director Joss Whedon
- Behind the scenes featurette on "Once More, with Feeling"
- "I've Got a Theory/Bunnies/If We're Together" karaoke music video
- "I'll Never Tell" karaoke music video
- "Walk Through the Fire" karaoke music video
- Easter egg

=== Disc 3 ===
==== Episodes ====
- Episode 9: "Smashed"
- Episode 10: "Wrecked"
- Episode 11: "Gone"

==== Special features ====
- Commentary on "Smashed" by writer Drew Greenberg
- Academy of Television Arts and Sciences Panel Discussion

=== Disc 4 ===
==== Episodes ====
- Episode 12: "Doublemeat Palace"
- Episode 13: "Dead Things"
- Episode 14: "Older and Far Away"
- Episode 15: "As You Were"

==== Special features ====
- "Buffy Gets a Job" featurette on "Doublemeat Palace"

=== Disc 5 ===
==== Episodes ====
- Episode 16: "Hell's Bells"
- Episode 17: "Normal Again"
- Episode 18: "Entropy"
- Episode 19: "Seeing Red"

==== Special features ====
- Commentary on "Hell's Bells" by director David Solomon and writer Rebecca Rand Kirshner
- Commentary on "Normal Again" by director Rick Rosenthal and writer Diego Gutierrez
- Easter egg

=== Disc 6 ===
==== Episodes ====
- Episode 20: "Villains"
- Episode 21: "Two to Go"
- Episode 22: "Grave"

==== Special features ====
- Commentary on "Grave" by director James A. Contner and writer David Fury
- "Life is the Big Bad – Season Six Overview"
- "Buffy the Vampire Slayer: Television with a Bite" documentary from A&E Network's Biography series
- Outtakes
- DVD-ROM Buffy Demon Guide

== Season 7 ==
=== Disc 1 ===
==== Episodes ====
- Episode 1: "Lessons"
- Episode 2: "Beneath You"
- Episode 3: "Same Time, Same Place"
- Episode 4: "Help"

==== Special features ====
- Commentary on "Lessons" by writer Joss Whedon and director David Solomon
- "Willow Demon Guide" DVD-ROM content

=== Disc 2 ===
==== Episodes ====
- Episode 5: "Selfless"
- Episode 6: "Him"
- Episode 7: "Conversations with Dead People"
- Episode 8: "Sleeper"

==== Special features ====
- Commentary on "Selfless" by director David Solomon and writer Drew Goddard
- Commentary on "Conversations with Dead People" by director Nick Marck, writers Jane Espenson and Drew Goddard, and actors Danny Strong and Tom Lenk

=== Disc 3 ===
==== Episodes ====
- Episode 9: "Never Leave Me"
- Episode 10: "Bring on the Night"
- Episode 11: "Showtime"

==== Special features ====
- "Buffy: It's Always Been About the Fans" featurette

=== Disc 4 ===
==== Episodes ====
- Episode 12: "Potential"
- Episode 13: "The Killer in Me"
- Episode 14: "First Date"
- Episode 15: "Get It Done"

==== Special features ====
- Commentary on "The Killer in Me" by director David Solomon and writer Drew Greenberg

=== Disc 5 ===
==== Episodes ====
- Episode 16: "Storyteller"
- Episode 17: "Lies My Parents Told Me"
- Episode 18: "Dirty Girls"
- Episode 19: "Empty Places"

==== Special features ====
- Commentary on "Lies My Parents Told Me" by co-writer/director David Fury, co-writer Drew Goddard, and actors James Marsters and D. B. Woodside
- Commentary on "Dirty Girls" by writer Drew Goddard and actor Nicholas Brendon

=== Disc 6 ===
==== Episodes ====
- Episode 20: "Touched"
- Episode 21: "End of Days"
- Episode 22: "Chosen"

==== Special features ====
- Commentary on "Chosen" by writer/director Joss Whedon
- "Season 7 Overview – Buffy: Full Circle" featurette
- "Buffy 101: Studying the Slayer" featurette
- "Generation S" featurette
- "The Last Sundown" featurette
- Outtakes reel
- Buffy wraps
- Easter egg

== Collections ==
DVD	Release date		
DVD	Region 1	Region 2	Region 4
The Chosen Collection (Seasons 1–7)	November 15, 2005		
The Complete DVD Collection (Seasons 1–7)		October 31, 2005	November 23, 2005

The Region 1 Buffy 40-disc boxed set includes a note from Joss Whedon as well as an extra disc (the 40th) with exclusive special features:

- Back to the Hellmouth: A Conversation with Creators and Cast – with Joss Whedon, Marti Noxon, David Fury, Drew Goddard, Jane Espenson, Nicholas Brendon, Charisma Carpenter, Emma Caulfield, and Danny Strong
- Breaking Barriers: It's Not a Chick Fight Thing
- Love Bites: Relationships in the Buffyverse
- Evil Fiends
- Buffy: An Unlikely Role Model
- Buffy Cast and Crew: Favorite Episodes

A repackaged 39-disc version was released on October 12, 2010, excluding the extra disc of bonus features.

=== Slimmer versions ===
The entire series was re-released on DVD in 2006, in a "slimmer" package with the same bonus materials that were featured in the original fold out versions. Even "slimmer" versions were issued in 2008.

=== Thematic releases ===
Two special Region 1 DVD releases contain assorted episodes from various seasons:

- Spike: Love is Hell (October 2005)

This single-disc release includes four Spike-related episodes: "School Hard", "Lie to Me", "Lovers Walk" and "Fool for Love", as well as a special feature on the character.

- The Curse of the Hellmouth (September 2006)

A two-disc set that contains eight Sunnydale-related episodes: "The Pack", "Halloween", "Passion", "The Wish", "Helpless", "Fear, Itself", "Hush" and "Same Time, Same Place", as well as a short supplemental featurette.

In Region 2, there have been several single-disc releases named after individual characters from the show, under the overarching title of "The Slayer Collection". Each contains four episodes and a character profile. The Spike-centric DVD contains the same episodes as the Region 1 "Love is Hell" collection. Other discs focus on Willow, Xander, Giles, Cordelia, Dawn, Angel, and Faith.

Two other single-disc Region 2 DVDs have been released. The first is titled "The Very Best of...". It contains these four episodes: "Becoming, Part One", "Graduation Day, Part Two", "Hush", and "The Gift". The second contains the episode "Once More, with Feeling" and a number of special features including a featurette on season 1 of Angel and a featurette titled "Buffy, Inside the Music".

In October 2008, a limited edition bonus DVD was made available exclusively to the retail chain Best Buy. The Region 1 85-minute DVD documents the 2008 Buffy Reunion at the Paley Festival, filmed on March 20, 2008. The DVD features interviews with Amber Benson, Nicholas Brendon, Charisma Carpenter, Emma Caulfield, Sarah Michelle Gellar, Seth Green, David Greenwalt, James Marsters, Michelle Trachtenberg & Joss Whedon. The DVD is available on Amazon and manufactured on-demand using DVD-R media.
