= Buffy the Vampire Slayer season 6 =

2001-2002 season of Buffy the Vampire Slayer

Buffy the Vampire Slayer
- Season 6
- Region 1 Season 6 DVD cover
- Showrunner: Marti Noxon
- Starring: Sarah Michelle Gellar; Nicholas Brendon; Emma Caulfield; Michelle Trachtenberg; Amber Benson; James Marsters; Alyson Hannigan
- No. of episodes: 22

Release
- Original network: UPN
- Original release: October 2, 2001 – May 21, 2002

Season chronology
- ← Previous; Season 5 Next → Season 7

The sixth season of the television series Buffy the Vampire Slayer premiered on October 2, 2001, with a two-hour premiere on UPN and concluded its 22-episode season with a two-hour finale on May 21, 2002. It maintained its previous timeslot, airing Tuesdays at 8:00 pm ET. This season marked the series' network change from The WB to UPN.

== Plot ==
After the gang struggle with using the Buffybot to patrol for vampires over the summer, Willow resurrects Buffy with a powerful spell. Although her friends believe that they have saved her from Hell, Buffy had actually been in Heaven since her death – a fact that she initially only divulges to Spike and later reveals to her friends. She is therefore traumatized by her resurrection and falls into a deep depression for most of the season. Dawn is happy to have her sister back, but Buffy's depression worsens Dawn's feelings of alienation to the point of kleptomania.

Giles returns to England after coming to believe that Buffy has become too reliant on him, while Buffy takes up a fast-food job for money and develops a sexually passionate, but eventually dysfunctional, affair with Spike, who discovers that his chip can no longer harm him when he hits her. For different reasons, Buffy and Spike are both emotionally tormented by the affair, and Buffy hides it from her friends, only confiding in a supportive Tara. Buffy later ends things with Spike, concluding that using him to deal with her depression is in fact killing her. Tara becomes concerned about Willow's addiction to magic and challenges her to go a week without it, but Willow gives in to her addiction, causing Tara to leave her. Despite their separation, Tara is still devoted to helping Willow with her addiction, leading to their reconciliation.

On the wedding day of Xander and Anya, a magician, seeking his own vengeance against Anya, deceives Xander into calling off the wedding by showing him a false future where they are both miserable. Anya becomes a vengeance demon once more, but when she cannot find anyone who wishes vengeance on Xander, and after Buffy has broken up with Spike, Anya and Spike seek solace in a one night stand, making both Buffy and Xander furious at Spike, especially for revealing his affair with Buffy.

The gang also begin to deal with The Trio, a group of nerds led by Warren Mears who use their technological and magical proficiency to attempt to kill or neutralize Buffy and take over Sunnydale, a goal they had in mind since the beginning of the season. The Trio often use monsters such as vampires and demons to assist them. Warren is shown to be the only competent villain of the group, and his capacity for evil is demonstrated by the attempted rape of his ex-girlfriend, which leads to her death. After Buffy thwarts his plans multiple times and the Trio break apart, Warren attacks Buffy with a gun but accidentally kills Tara with a stray bullet. Willow tries to resurrect Tara but fails.

Tara's death causes Willow to descend into darkness and unleash all of her dark magical powers. She hunts down and fatally flays Warren in revenge. Driven by grief, Willow fights and overpowers Buffy, who is forced to fight when she is unable to condone Willow's actions. Giles returns to help face Willow in battle and infuses her with light magic, tapping into her remaining humanity. This initially backfires when Willow feels the pain in everyone around the world and decides to destroy it in order to end everyone's suffering. At the climax of the season, Xander stops Willow by reminding her of their friendship and telling her that he loves her no matter what, the same way Tara did. She eventually breaks down crying in his arms, and the dark magic drains from her. Meanwhile, Buffy comes to terms with being alive again and promises to be there for her sister and friends.

At the end of the season, after attacking and attempting to rape Buffy, a remorseful and confused Spike leaves Sunnydale and travels to Africa to see a demon and ask him to "make him to what he used to be" so that he can "give Buffy what she deserves". The audience is led to believe that he was referring to the freedom to be evil (unrestrained by his punishment chip) and thus able to kill Buffy; however, after passing a series of tests, Spike is rewarded with the restoration of his soul.

== Cast and characters ==
=== Main cast ===
- Sarah Michelle Gellar as Buffy Summers
- Nicholas Brendon as Xander Harris
- Emma Caulfield as Anya Jenkins
- Michelle Trachtenberg as Dawn Summers
- Amber Benson as Tara Maclay (Note: Benson is only credited in the opening credits for one episode, and is credited as a guest star for all her other appearances.)
- James Marsters as Spike
- Alyson Hannigan as Willow Rosenberg

=== Recurring cast ===
- Tom Lenk as Andrew Wells
- Danny Strong as Jonathan Levinson
- Adam Busch as Warren Mears
- Anthony Stewart Head as Rupert Giles
- James C. Leary as Clem
- Kali Rocha as Halfrek
- Elizabeth Anne Allen as Amy Madison
- Jeff Kober as Rack
- Amelinda Embry as Katrina Silber

=== Guest cast ===
- Marc Blucas as Riley Finn
- Ivana Milicevic as Samantha Finn
- Dean Butler as Hank Summers
- Kristine Sutherland as Joyce Summers
- Andy Umberger as D'Hoffryn

== Crew ==
Series creator Joss Whedon served as executive producer, but his role was diminished as he took a hiatus to write the musical episode, and later Fox ordered a new pilot from him, Firefly. Whedon only ended up writing and directing one episode, the musical; this is also the only season where he didn't write and direct the season finale. Marti Noxon was promoted to executive producer and took over the duties of the showrunner and wrote three episodes. David Fury was promoted to co-executive producer and wrote four episodes, directing one of them, as well as writing the season finale. Jane Espenson was promoted to supervising producer and wrote or co-wrote four episodes. Douglas Petrie was promoted to producer, later to supervising producer midseason and wrote or co-wrote three episodes, including directing two of them. Steven S. DeKnight was promoted to story editor and wrote three episodes. Rebecca Rand Kirshner was promoted to story editor and wrote two episodes. New additions in the sixth season included Drew Z. Greenberg who wrote three episodes and Diego Gutierrez, who wrote a freelance episode after previously being an assistant to Whedon.

David Solomon (also producer) directed the highest number of episodes in the sixth season, directing five episodes. James A. Contner (also co-producer) and David Grossman each directed three.

== Episodes ==
No. overall	No. in season	Title	Directed by	Written by	Original release date	Prod. code	U.S. viewers (millions)
101	1	"Bargaining (Part 1)"	David Grossman	Marti Noxon	October 2, 2001	6ABB01	7.65
Giles leaves town after wondering whether he still has a place in Sunnydale without Buffy. A vampire discovers that the Slayer has been replaced by a robot. Meanwhile, The Scoobies attempt to raise Buffy from the dead with a powerful spell.
102	2	"Bargaining (Part 2)"	David Grossman	David Fury	October 2, 2001	6ABB02	7.65
Sunnydale is invaded by a gang of biker demons who, having learned that the Slayer is a robot, wreak havoc on the town. Meanwhile, the Scoobies attempt to flee from the demons while the real Buffy, having been resurrected from the dead, returns to the place of her death for an emotional confrontation with her younger sister.
103	3	"After Life"	David Solomon	Jane Espenson	October 9, 2001	6ABB03	5.58
Spike warns that the resurrection spell could have serious consequences, and his assessment proves to be correct as members of the gang are possessed by an unseen force.
104	4	"Flooded"	Douglas Petrie	Jane Espenson & Douglas Petrie	October 16, 2001	6ABB04	6.03
Buffy faces financial problems while Warren, Andrew, and Jonathan team up in order to take over Sunnydale. They send a M'Fashnik demon to kill Buffy, whom they believe to be their biggest threat.
105	5	"Life Serial"	Nick Marck	David Fury & Jane Espenson	October 23, 2001	6ABB05	5.68
Buffy is in serious need of money to support herself and Dawn, and she tries to focus on bringing in some money. However, her attempts fail as Jonathan, Warren, and Andrew create a number of obstacles to test her ability.
106	6	"All the Way"	David Solomon	Steven S. DeKnight	October 30, 2001	6ABB06	5.23
Xander finally announces his engagement to Anya, and the Scoobies go back to Buffy's house to celebrate. Dawn sneaks out on Halloween by lying to Buffy but finds the boy she is falling for is a vampire, despite the fact he shouldn't be out on Halloween. Willow and Tara argue about Willow's overactive use of magic.
107	7	"Once More, with Feeling"	Joss Whedon	Joss Whedon	November 6, 2001	6ABB07	5.44
A mysterious force compels Sunnydale residents to break out into song and dance numbers that reveal their true feelings, and a new demon in town, Sweet, seems to be responsible for it. Buffy and Spike share a kiss.
108	8	"Tabula Rasa"	David Grossman	Rebecca Rand Kirshner	November 13, 2001	6ABB08	5.40
Willow and Tara argue over an amnesia spell, and Tara insists that Willow is dependent on magic. Willow promises to go a week without using magic but breaches the promise, causing the gang to forget who they are. Buffy and Spike kiss again. Giles goes back to London. Tara and Willow break up.
109	9	"Smashed"	Turi Meyer	Drew Z. Greenberg	November 20, 2001	6ABB09	5.00
Willow finds herself alone without Tara and discovers she's now powerful enough to turn the metamorphosed Amy from a rat back into human. They go out partying while Spike discovers that he can hurt Buffy.
110	10	"Wrecked"	David Solomon	Marti Noxon	November 27, 2001	6ABB10	5.57
Buffy is shaken by her previous meeting with Spike the night before, where they slept together and caused the building around them to collapse. Amy takes Willow to a sorcerer called Rack whose power gets her hooked. However, it ends with devastating consequences.
111	11	"Gone"	David Fury	David Fury	January 8, 2002	6ABB11	5.16
A social services worker threatens to take Dawn away from Buffy. Jonathan, Warren, and Andrew attempt to make themselves invisible, but the beam accidentally hits Buffy.
112	12	"Doublemeat Palace"	Nick Marck	Jane Espenson	January 29, 2002	6ABB12	5.57
Buffy gets a job at the Doublemeat Palace, but soon becomes paranoid about the mysterious secret ingredient in the food. Anya is visited by her old friend, Halfrek, who questions her relationship with Xander.
113	13	"Dead Things"	James A. Contner	Steven S. DeKnight	February 5, 2002	6ABB13	5.21
Warren tries to make his ex-girlfriend Katrina his sex slave using magic, but when she fights back, he kills her. Afraid of getting caught, he convinces Jonathan and Andrew to help him use a curse to make Buffy think that she killed Katrina.
114	14	"Older and Far Away"	Michael Gershman	Drew Z. Greenberg	February 12, 2002	6ABB14	5.01
Dawn, feeling that nobody wants to spend time with her, makes a wish in front of a vengeance demon that everyone would stay with her. Fulfilling her wish, the demon causes everyone at Buffy's birthday party to be unable to leave.
115	15	"As You Were"	Douglas Petrie	Douglas Petrie	February 26, 2002	6ABB15	4.70
Riley returns to town – newly married – and enlists Buffy's help to track down a demon. Her encounter with Riley causes Buffy to end her relationship with Spike.
116	16	"Hell's Bells"	David Solomon	Rebecca Rand Kirshner	March 5, 2002	6ABB16	5.61
Before Xander and Anya's wedding, Xander's future self suddenly appears, and warns him that his marriage to Anya will be the beginning of a life of disgrace and pain. Xander is shown flashes of the future, convincing him to call it off, but later it is discovered it is only a demon taking revenge on Anyanka from her demon days. Nevertheless, the wedding doesn't go ahead and Anya and Xander break up.
117	17	"Normal Again"	Rick Rosenthal	Diego Gutierrez	March 12, 2002	6ABB17	5.01
Warren, Jonathan, and Andrew unleash a demon whose powers make Buffy believe that her friends are figments of her imagination. Buffy attempts to attack her friends, locks them in her basement and unleashes the same demon on them. Tara eventually finds the trio and Buffy recovers from the demon's poison by drinking an antidote. By the end of the episode however, it is unclear which world is reality.
118	18	"Entropy"	James A. Contner	Drew Z. Greenberg	April 30, 2002	6ABB18	4.53
Anya seeks vengeance on Xander and when looking for someone who wants the same, she finds comfort with Spike. Xander sees their impulsive behavior through a camera and tries to stake Spike. Willow and Tara arrange a date, which ends with the two of them kissing.
119	19	"Seeing Red"	Michael Gershman	Steven S. DeKnight	May 7, 2002	6ABB19	4.06
Willow and Tara reconcile, and Tara tells Willow that Spike and Buffy had been sleeping together. After his advances are rejected yet again by Buffy, Spike attempts to assault a bruised Buffy in her home, but she manages to stop him. Buffy stops The Trio when attempting a large-scale theft. Andrew and Jonathan are caught and imprisoned, but Warren escapes with a jetpack. Furious at being thwarted once again, Warren attempts to shoot Buffy, wounding her but also hitting Tara, who collapses and dies in Willow's arms.
120	20	"Villains"	David Solomon	Marti Noxon	May 14, 2002	6ABB20	4.96
Willow, after being told Tara cannot be resurrected, is pushed over the edge by her grief. After magically saving Buffy, a vengeful Willow hunts down Warren, who desperately tries to escape town. Though her friends try to stop her, Willow tracks down Warren and brutally murders him by flaying him and burning him alive with her magic.
121	21	"Two to Go"	Bill L. Norton	Douglas Petrie	May 21, 2002	6ABB21	5.31
After killing Warren, Willow plots to murder Andrew and Jonathan as well. Meanwhile, the rest of the Scoobies try to break the two nerds out of prison before Willow can get to them.
122	22	"Grave"	James A. Contner	David Fury	May 21, 2002	6ABB22	5.31
Giles returns armed with temporary magic, but Willow defeats him and decides to end her suffering and the world's by bringing on an apocalypse. Xander attempts to stop her. In Africa, Spike completes a set of challenges given to him by a demon who offers him his soul if he is successful.

=== Crossovers with Angel ===
The sixth season of Buffy the Vampire Slayer coincided with the third season of Angel. With this season, Buffy switched networks from The WB to UPN, while Angel still remained on The WB. Because they were on competing networks, there were no official crossovers. At the time, WB Entertainment President Jordan Levin stated "There will be no crossovers between Angel and Buffy. I think it's more important, in the long term, that Angel really establishes itself as a world that obviously comes from the same mythology, but operates with its own set of principles, guidelines and characters, and really establishes itself independently from Buffy." Although there are no distinct crossovers where characters appear on the other shows, there are moments where characters are mentioned or interactions between the two series' characters occur off screen.

At the end of the Angel episode "Carpe Noctem", Angel (David Boreanaz) receives a telephone call in which Willow tells him Buffy is alive. Buffy then receives a call from Angel at the end of "Flooded", and immediately leaves to meet with him. Although the phone call scenes happen on screen, neither Willow's side on Angel nor Angel's side on Buffy is shown. The scene between Buffy and Angel also happens off screen, but is described by them in the following episodes.

Due to the crossover embargo, this is the only season of Buffy in which Angel does not appear.

== Reception ==
The series received four Primetime Emmy Award nominations, for Outstanding Hairstyling for a Series, Outstanding Makeup for a Series (Non-Prosthetic), and Outstanding Makeup for a Series (Prosthetic) for "Hell's Bells"; and Outstanding Music Direction for "Once More, with Feeling".

Sarah Michelle Gellar, Alyson Hannigan, James Marsters, and Emma Caulfield were nominated for Satellite Awards for their performances.

The cast won a Special Achievement Award for Outstanding Television Ensemble at the Satellite Awards. The Futon Critic named "Life Serial" the 15th best episode of 2001, "Once More, with Feeling" the 3rd best episode of 2001 and "Normal Again" the 35th best episode of 2002.

The sixth season averaged 4.6 million viewers, slightly higher than the third season of Angel.

Based on 21 reviews, Rotten Tomatoes gave season six a score of 67% with an average rating of 8.30 out of 10. The website's critics consensus states, "Buffy gets an A for effort, but a bleaker tone and some jarring plot twists make this penultimate season a series low."

"Once More, with Feeling" earned nominations for a Hugo Award for Best Dramatic Presentation and a Nebula Award for Best Script. It was well-received by both the media and critics, gaining praise during its original broadcast, overseas syndication, and in retrospective discussions about the series. Critics thought that the episode worked beautifully, exhibited graceful pacing, and was clever and affecting, praising its songs and performances. Despite its risky concept of a musical episode within a supernatural series, critics and writers commended its execution. The episode was described as both a parody and homage to the musical genre, with some critics lauding its depth and storytelling and placing it among the best in television.

"Once More, with Feeling" and "Tabula Rasa" are ranked among the best episodes of the series by many publications. (Note: Attributed to multiple references:)

=== Criticism ===
Season six of Buffy the Vampire Slayer is the most controversial among its ardent fandom because it was dramatically darker in tone than previous seasons; it has been called the show's "most hated season". Syfy Wire stated that the show's sixth season "has always been a thorn in its fandom's side. It was a little darker, a little meaner, and a little too different from what came before for the entrenched base to accept."

Joanna Robinson of Vanity Fair wrote on the 20th anniversary of the show's premiere that season 6, "a dark, unpopular chapter in the show's seven-year run...once its most hated - has become its most important." Robinson praised the introduction of the Evil Trio, the much-maligned "Big Bad" villains for season 6, as presaging the later trend of "entitled, misogynistic rhetoric that rose to the surface during the Gamergate culture wars of 2014, and has seemingly infiltrated everything since—the 2016 presidential election included." She concluded, positively, that "It may lack some of the trademark zip of the show in its prime, and critics of the Dark Willow storyline, in particular, are not wrong in their concerns. But with the luxury of historical context, Season 6 of Buffy carries more powerful resonance than any other moment in the show's history."

About the season's criticism, Joss Whedon says: "I love season 6. It’s really important. But it was a very stark thing to do. It wasn’t just putting Buffy in a very bad, abusive, weird relationship, it was some sort of an end to magic. For me because childhood is so rich with metaphor, a lot of it had to do with leaving that behind. Instead of a bigger than life villain, we had the nerd troika. Instead of drinking blood and doing spells as a sexual metaphor, we had sex. Things became very literal and they lost some of their loveliness. I still think that a lot of the best episodes we ever did were in season 6. I don’t agree with the detractors, but I understand it."

Acting as showrunner for season 6, Marti Noxon received the brunt of fan criticism, eventually stating in 2018 that she felt parts of season 6 "went too far." She elaborated that "We pushed into some categories that almost felt sadistic and that Buffy was volunteering for things that were beyond just “bad choices” and were almost irresponsible for the character. That may have to do with my own history...And I think that killing Tara was — in retrospect, of all the people, did she have to die?" She explained her rationale for taking Buffy in a darker direction, stating that "...I was really vocal about wanting Buffy to make some bad mistakes. My argument was that, when we become young women, especially if we're troubled or haunted by something, that can lead us to make some bad choices, especially in the area of romance."

== Home media ==
Buffy the Vampire Slayer: The Complete Sixth Season was released on DVD in region 1 on May 25, 2004 on in region 2 on May 12, 2003. The DVD includes all 22 episodes on 6 discs presented in full frame 1.33:1 aspect ratio (region 1) and in anamorphic widescreen 1.78:1 aspect ratio (region 2 and 4); "Once More, with Feeling" is presented in letterbox widescreen on the region 1 release. Special features on the DVD include six commentary tracks—"Bargaining (Parts 1 & 2)" by writers Marti Noxon and David Fury; "Once More, with Feeling" by writer and director Joss Whedon; "Smashed" by writer Drew Z. Greenberg; "Hell's Bells" by writer Rebecca Rand Kirshner and director David Solomon; and "Grave" by writer David Fury and director James A. Contner. Episode-specific featurettes include a 30-minute documentary on the musical episode as well as karaoke music videos for several musical numbers. "Buffy Gets a Job" features several of the cast and crew members discussing their first jobs and dream jobs. Other featurettes include, the Academy of Television Arts & Sciences Panel Discussion with cast and crew members; "Buffy the Vampire Slayer: Television with a Bite", a 43-minute A&E Network documentary from their Biography series that details its popularity and critical reception with interviews with cast and crew members; and "Life is the Big Bad – Season Six Overview", a 30-minute featurette where cast and crew members discuss the season. Also included are series outtakes and DVD-ROM content.
