= Selfless (Buffy the Vampire Slayer) =

- Buffy the Vampire Slayer episode
- Episode no.: Season 7 Episode 5
- Directed by: David Solomon
- Written by: Drew Goddard
- Production code: 7ABB05
- Original air date: October 22, 2002

Guest appearances
- Abraham Benrubi as Olaf the Troll; Andy Umberger as D'Hoffryn; Kali Rocha as Halfrek; Joyce Guy as Professor Hawkins; Jennifer Shon as Rachel; Taylor Sutherland as Villager #1; Marybeth Scherr as Villager #2; Alessandro Mastrobuono as Villager #3; Daniel Spanton as Viking #1; John Timmons as Viking #2

Episode chronology
← Previous "Help"	Next → "Him"
- Buffy the Vampire Slayer season 7

"Selfless" (Note: Victoria Large notes that Anya's identity is never fully addressed until "Selfless," "which, as its punning title implies, dealt with Anya's lack of a self.") is the fifth episode of the seventh and final season of television series Buffy the Vampire Slayer. The episode aired on October 22, 2002, on UPN.

The story revolves around Anya and her sense of self. After she wreaks vengeance on several young men who wronged a college woman, Buffy determines to kill her and Xander is equally determined to save her.

== Plot ==
Anya returns to her old vengeance demon ways by helping a girl get revenge on an entire fraternity by having a spider demon tear their hearts out. Anya herself feels deep remorse about the event, even though her demon friend Halfrek encourages her to continue. Willow, returning to college, sees Anya, who lies to her, saying that she has a new boyfriend there. Willow discovers the frightened and crying girl and the remains of the fraternity brothers in the frat house, so she confronts Anya and offers her help in giving up her vengeance work; but Anya acts stubborn and defensive.

In a flashback, set in Sweden, 880 A.D., Anya, originally named Aud, loves a Viking warrior, Olaf. He is alternately romantic and teasing, and laughs when she says she will share their rabbits with their fellow villagers to demonstrate "selflessly" giving to others. She worries about his fidelity, and when she learns he cheated on her, she takes revenge on him by using a magic spell to turn him into a troll. (Note: Olaf the Troll first appeared in the Season 5 episode "Triangle," in which Olaf ordered Xander to choose his favorite between his girlfriend, Anya, and his best friend, Willow. Though Olaf was banished, his magic hammer (like Thor's Mjölnir) helped to defeat that season's Big Bad in the finale, "The Gift.") D'Hoffryn, master of a cabal of vengeance demons, endows upon her demonic status.

When Willow tells Buffy and Xander about the fraternity, all three fear the worst of Anya. Buffy is determined to kill her; Xander, who still loves her, cannot believe Buffy could do such a thing. He claims that Buffy is hypocritical since she is so quick to kill Anya but ignored what her vampire lovers have done - but Buffy reminds him that she killed Angel because it needed to be done and that Xander cheered her on.

In another flashback, Halfrek and Anyanka celebrate their successful push to create the Russian Revolution of 1905. Anyanka wants to look for more wronged women; Halfrek complains, "it's always work, work, work with you," and Anyanka responds, "What else is there? ... Vengeance is what I do, Halfrek. I don't need anything else. Vengeance is what I am."

Buffy and Xander track Anya back to the frat house, where the two women fight as Xander tries to stop them. Buffy stabs Anya, seemingly killing her, but Anya's demon side prevents her from dying.

In another flashback, apparently to the events of "Once More, with Feeling," Anya sings about her love for Xander and how she will be his missus: "I will be his Mrs. / Mrs. Anya lame-ass made-up maiden name (Note: In the episode "Checkpoint," Anya gives her name and backstory, apparently made up on the spot, to conceal her demon identity: "Anya Christina Emanuella Jenkins, twenty years old. Born on the Fourth of July, and don't think there weren't jokes about that my whole life, mister, 'cause there were. 'Who's our little patriot?' they'd say..." Before meeting her, Giles identifies her as the "Patron Saint of Scorned Women." In "Lessons", Halfrek gives her another name: "They're calling you 'Miss Softserve.'") Harris."

The story returns to the fight. Willow calls forth D'Hoffryn, using the talisman he gave her while trying to recruit her as Anya's replacement. When he interrupts the fight between her and Buffy, Anya begs him to reverse the fatal spell she worked – even though she knows the cost of reversing such a spell is the life and soul of a vengeance demon. Anya is ready to die, even if Xander does not want her to, but D'Hoffryn instead summons Halfrek and kills her as the price to bring back the fraternity boys, returning Anya to human status and wanting her to suffer through her guilt rather than die. A distraught Anya leaves and tells Xander not to follow her, wondering what her purpose is outside of their relationship now that she is mortal again.

== Production ==
=== Filming ===
Kali Rocha (Halfrek) was in New York performing in the play Noises Off during filming. According to the episode's DVD commentary, she was flown in for one day and filmed all of her Season 7 scenes that day, including those in "Lessons" and "Selfless". Rocha filmed her "death scene" in front of a green screen, and her actions were later superimposed onto the images featuring the other actors.

Sarah Michelle Gellar was available for only three days during filming, as she married Freddie Prinze Jr. in Mexico (Note: A reporter for Bustle wrote, "The pair were engaged in April 2001 and went on to marry a year later, holding their wedding ceremony on Sept. 1, 2002 in Mexico at the El Careyes resort.") for the Labor Day weekend in 2002. Scriptwriter Drew Goddard said in the DVD commentary that Sarah's braided hair in the episode was her "wedding hair" (photos here and here).

== Themes ==
Anya defines herself by her jobs, whether as a demon or as a worker who is subordinate to her boss, whether D'Hoffryn or Rupert Giles at the Magic Box; or, despite being a highly sexualized woman, by her relationships with lovers Olaf and Xander (or even the made-up fraternity guy).

In the article "Selfless: Buffy's Anya and the Problem of Identity," by Victoria Large, Anya is figured as "powerful, but problematic":

It could be argued that prior to this episode, the producers and writers of Buffy are guilty of characterizing Anya in a way that reinforces gender stereotypes. The early incarnation of the character as Anyanka... depicts the destructive power of a monstrous woman in a way that harks back to some of the oldest patriarchal myths and stories. When Anya becomes human she is mainly a source of comic relief, typically identified either with her status as Xander's girlfriend or her formerly demonic nature. ... Xander tells Buffy that while he is enjoying the single life as a "strong successful male," he worries about Anya because she "seems so sad." In this moment, Xander has inadvertently given voice to society's double standard for single men and women. ... Throughout the episode, Anya's willingness to accept the labels that the patriarchal society places on her are what prevent her from defining herself as an individual.

Throughout Buffy, Anya also allows other characters to define her. When she first meets D'Hoffryn in this episode, he tells her, "I'm afraid you don't see your true self. You are Anyanka." She was either Olaf's fiancée or his wife. Singing the "missus" song shows that she is willing to reject the name she gave herself to become Mrs. Xander Harris, and that she considers herself so far to have been merely "lame-ass" in society. Also showing that she used to support the rise of proletarian revolutions against monarchies, in recent seasons she is a money-obsessed capitalist, which is a socially constructed relationship to money, not self - "I have a place in the world now. I'm part of the system. I'm a workin' gal." - and she is heavily invested in her view of herself as a retailer, then shop-owner, to customers at the Magic Box.

At the climactic fight, she says, "Xander, you can't help me. I'm not even sure there's a me to help." Reviewer Billie Doux writes, "At the end, Anya said to Xander, 'What if I'm really nobody?' That's what this episode was about. Anya has been three different and distinct beings, but she still doesn't have a self to call her own." In the following episode, "Him," she tells Buffy, "I need to figure out who I am."

== Cultural references ==
Spike appears for only a few moments, being still crazy in the Sunnydale High School basement, but he makes an allusion ("Scream Montresor all you like, pet") to Edgar Allan Poe's short story "The Cask of Amontillado," in keeping with the themes of murder and revenge.

== Critical reception ==
Vox ranked this episode at #25 out of the 144 Buffy episodes, in honor of the 20th anniversary of the show, saying it "is the only episode of Buffy to focus on Anya, and it's such a terrific episode that it suggests the show should have gone back to her more often. ... [I]t also develops a thesis about who Anya is and what she needs: She's always based her identity on those around her, and she needs to figure out who she is on her own."

Noel Murray of The A.V. Club wrote that "the sometimes jarring shifts between the dark business in the present and Anya's lighter-toned backstory were superbly handled, giving both their due. The faux-scratchy images in the 880 scenes... the "Once More With Feeling" musical reprises in 2001 ("mustard on my shirt!")... it's all so fun that whenever the episode cuts back to blood-spattered, joyless Anya, we feel the lack." Mark Oshiro draws parallels between this episode and "Fool for Love," praises Drew Goddard's handling of the personality conflicts, and concludes, "'Selfless' really hinges on the emotional resolution to this dilemma. Truthfully, no one had asked Anya what she wanted. They all assumed they knew what was best for her."
