= Hell's Bells (Buffy the Vampire Slayer) =

- Buffy the Vampire Slayer episode
- Episode no.: Season 6 Episode 16
- Directed by: David Solomon
- Written by: Rebecca Rand Kirshner
- Production code: 6ABB16
- Original air date: March 5, 2002

Guest appearances
- Casey Sander as Tony Harris; Kali Rocha as Halfrek; Andy Umberger as D'Hoffryn; Lee Garlington as Jessica Harris; Jan Hoag as Cousin Carol; George D. Wallace as Old Xander Harris; Amber Benson as Tara Maclay; Steven Gilborn as Uncle Rory; James C. Leary as Clem; Daniel McFeeley as Warty Demon; Rebecca Jackson as Tarantula; Mel Fair as Tentacle Demon; Nick Kokich as Demon Teen; Robert Noble as Night Manager; Julian Franco as Young Bartender; Susannah L. Brown as Caterer Girl; Joey Hiott as Josh age 10; Abigail Mavity as Sara age 8; Chris Emerson as Josh age 21; Ashleigh Ann Wood as Sara age 18; Megan Vint as Karen

Episode chronology
← Previous "As You Were"	Next → "Normal Again"
- Buffy the Vampire Slayer season 6

"Hell's Bells" is the 16th episode of season 6 of the television series Buffy the Vampire Slayer. It aired on March 5, 2002 on UPN. In the episode, Anya and Xander are about to get married but things change due to the arrival of an old man.

== Plot ==
Buffy and Willow criticize their bright green dresses and discuss Anya and Xander's rehearsal dinner, noting that the Harris family surprisingly accepted Anya's demon friends as "circus people". Willow is the best man, while Buffy, Dawn, and Tara are bridesmaids. Xander struggles to get dressed amid his family and Anya's friends. His parents, Tony and Jessica, complain about the wedding arrangements. An old man appears mysteriously in Sunnydale.

Buffy helps Xander with his attire, while Tara and Willow assist Anya with her dress. Xander's uncle Rory shows off his date, who is actually a caterer. D'Hoffryn and Halfrek arrive, and Dawn greets them. D'Hoffryn gives Dawn a live wedding gift. Dawn mingles and encounters Spike with a date. Buffy and Xander discuss keeping his parents out of trouble. Xander is bombarded with complaints, and a drunken Tony insults Anya's demon friends, nearly causing a fight.

The old man, claiming to be future Xander, warns present Xander not to marry Anya, showing him a grim future. Shocked, Xander is advised to call off the wedding. Buffy and Spike discuss the wedding and Spike's attempt to make her jealous with his date, leading Spike to leave with his date. Willow gives Xander a final pep talk. Anya rehearses her vows, and Buffy stalls the guests with charades. Anya learns Xander is missing and panics. Xander walks away in the rain, while his parents return to the bar, blaming Anya for the ruined wedding.

A fight breaks out between the wedding guests, and Willow rescues Tara. Anya confronts a man in a trench coat, discovering he is a demon she created, seeking revenge. He showed Xander false future visions to ruin the wedding. Buffy and Xander defeat the demon. Xander, fearing he will become abusive like his father, refuses to marry Anya. They part ways, leaving both devastated. Anya is comforted by D'Hoffryn, who offers her job as a vengeance demon back.
