= Doppelgangland =

- Buffy the Vampire Slayer episode
- Episode no.: Season 3 Episode 16
- Directed by: Joss Whedon
- Written by: Joss Whedon
- Production code: 3ABB16
- Original air date: February 23, 1999

Guest appearances
- Harry Groener as Mayor Richard Wilkins; Alexis Denisof as Wesley Wyndam-Pryce; Emma Caulfield as Anya; Ethan Erickson as Percy West; Eliza Dushku as Faith Lehane; Armin Shimerman as Principal Snyder; Jason Hall as Devon MacLeish; Michael Nagy as Alfonse; Andy Umberger as D'Hoffryn; Megan Gray as Sandy; Norma Michaels as Older Woman; Corey Michael Blake as Waiter; Jennifer Nicole as Body-Double Willow

Episode chronology
← Previous "Consequences"	Next → "Enemies"
- Buffy the Vampire Slayer season 3

"Doppelgangland" is the sixteenth episode of the third season of the fantasy television series Buffy the Vampire Slayer (1997–2003). It was written and directed by the show's creator, Joss Whedon, and originally aired on The WB in the United States on February 23, 1999. The episode's title is derived from the term "Doppelgänger", a German word for a lookalike or double of a living person.

"Doppelgangland," a very popular episode, revisits the alternate reality portrayed in "The Wish", in which Buffy never arrived in Sunnydale and vampires ruled the city. Anya, a vengeance demon who previously granted the wish, attempts a spell to regain her amulet and with it her powers.

== Plot ==
Anya unsuccessfully entreats D'Hoffryn to restore her demonic powers.

Principal Snyder browbeats Willow into tutoring basketball star Percy West. At Giles's request, Willow hacks into Mayor Wilkins's files; when Faith finds out, she alerts him of the intrusion. The Mayor presents Faith with a fully furnished apartment and then tells her he plans to have Willow killed.

Percy makes it clear that his idea of tutoring is that Willow should do his homework, and Willow does not correct him. Frustrated and unhappy, Willow then quarrels with Buffy and Xander, telling them that she feels rebellious and may change her look and behavior, and storms off. Assisting Anya with a spell to retrieve a lost amulet, Willow's conjuration goes awry and instead summons an alternate Vampiric version of herself. (This alternate reality was created by Cordelia's wish that Buffy never came to Sunnydale in the episode The Wish). Neither Anya nor Willow realize the consequences of their spell.

Vampire Willow sees Sunnydale is a lot different. No one is afraid of her and there are more humans than vampires, which means the city is peaceful and corruption-free. Vampire Willow goes to the Bronze, where she fights with Percy and throws him across the pool table. Vampire Willow runs into her old lover Xander and realizes that he is alive. She also sees Buffy who is alive and despises her. She shows her vampire face to Xander and Buffy. Two vampires sent by the Mayor attack her, but she turns them to her side. Buffy and Xander tell Giles that Willow has been killed and turned vampire, but the genuine Willow arrives to demonstrate their error. None of them are aware of Vampire Willow's true origins.

Angel and Anya drop into the Bronze, where Oz is with the band onstage. Vampire Willow and her new minions arrive and capture the crowd. Angel escapes to find Buffy. Anya recognizes what has happened, offers to restore Vampire Willow to her own world in return for help in retrieving her amulet, and suggests capturing the other Willow to assist in the spell. Angel, Buffy and Xander head for the Bronze, but Willow turns back to get the tranquilizer gun and is grabbed by her doppelgänger. Willow manages to shoot the vampire with the tranquilizer gun. The others arrive back in the library after being alerted of Vamp Willow in the school and they lock the unconscious vampire in the library cage, then Willow exchanges clothes with her in an attempt to pass herself off as Doppel-Willow. They return to the Bronze.

Cordelia arrives at the library and unwittingly releases Vampire Willow, who immediately attacks her, but Wesley intervenes and drives the vampire away. At the Bronze, although Anya exposes Willow's disguise, Buffy defeats the other vampires, then captures the doppelgänger. Anya returns vampire Willow to her own timeline, where the alternate Oz immediately kills her before the reality erases. The next day, Percy, thoroughly intimidated by Willow's doppelgänger (and believing she was the real Willow), shows up for tutoring with all his work completed and makes it clear he intends to please her from now on.

== Reception ==
When the episode was originally broadcast in the United States on February 23, 1999, it received a Nielsen rating of 4.1. It was the second most watched program of the week on The WB Television Network.

"Doppelgangland" primarily focuses on the character Willow. Series creator Joss Whedon has placed it fifth in his list of favorite episodes from the show, stating "one Willow is certainly not enough." Malinda Lo from AfterEllen.com included the episode in her top ten as well. Alyson Hannigan, who portrays the character Willow, also considers the episode to be one of her favorites in the series.

Billie Doux, giving the episode 4 out of 4 stakes, writes, "Evil double plots are done to death, but they can be marvelous when they're done well. And this one was done exceptionally well. It was very clever and very funny, with one liners coming thick and fast and everyone wonderfully in character. Alyson Hannigan again did a superb job as Willow, vamp Willow, and Willow playing vamp Willow."

According to TV.com, the episode holds an average score of 9.5/10, based on 658 compiled ratings. Vox, rating it at #13 in a list of all 144 episodes, writes, "Watching Willow wrestle with an alternate-reality version of herself is even better when you know what’s to come in later seasons ("Hands! Hands!"), and it would be an understatement to say that Alyson Hannigan shines in both roles. We also get our first look at Anya since she lost her powers — impatient and frustrated and unable to even order a beer — which is endearing even though she nearly sabotages the gang’s plan to save the day."

Noel Murray from The A.V. Club commented that the episode "is terrific on myriad levels, from the dialogue to the plot twists to the multiple spot-on character moments. But mostly it's a top-drawer episode for the way it binds the Buffyverse together, by demonstrating how adept the writing staff is at remembering everything they've done on the show before, and re-using the elements that still have plenty of juice in them."

== Bibliography ==
- Kaveney, Roz (ed.) (2004). Reading the Vampire Slayer: The New, Updated, Unofficial Guide to Buffy and Angel, Tauris Parke Paperbacks. ISBN 1-4175-2192-9
