= Ripple Effect (film) =

- Directed by: Philippe Caland
- Written by: Philippe Caland
- Produced by: Philippe Caland
- Starring: Forest Whitaker; Virginia Madsen; Minnie Driver; Philippe Caland
- Cinematography: Daron Keet
- Edited by: Joseph Semense; Yvan Gauthier
- Music by: Anthony Marinelli
- Production company: YBG Prods.
- Distributed by: Monterey Media
- Release dates: June 21, 2007 (Avignon); September 26, 2008 (Manhattan)
- Running time: 83 minutes
- Country: United States
- Language: English

Ripple Effect is a 2007 American drama film written and directed by Philippe Caland and starring Forest Whitaker, Virginia Madsen, Minnie Driver and Caland. Whitaker, Madsen and Driver also served as executive producers of the film.

== Cast ==
- Forest Whitaker as Phillip
- Virginia Madsen as Sherry
- Minnie Driver as Kitty
- Philippe Caland as Amer
- John Billingsley
- Kip Pardue
- Kali Rocha
- Charley Mae Caland

== Reception ==
The film has a 29% rating on Rotten Tomatoes.

Neil Genzlinger of The New York Times gave the film a negative review and wrote, "But there’s only so much they can do with his script, which starts with a not-very-original insight and takes too many shortcuts delivering it."

Jeff Shannon of The Seattle Times gave the film a positive review and wrote, "After a bumpy start, Ripple Effect begins to show why Whitaker, Virginia Madsen and Minnie Driver signed on as executive producers and co-stars."
