= Teachers (2006 TV series) =

American sitcom television series

- Genre: Sitcom
- Created by: Matt Tarses
- Starring: Justin Bartha; Sarah Alexander; Phil Hendrie; Deon Richmond; Kali Rocha; Sarah Shahi; Matt Winston
- Composer: Jim Wheeler Rick Cowling
- Country of origin: United States
- Original language: English
- No. of seasons: 1
- No. of episodes: 6

Production
- Executive producers: Matt Tarses; Bill Wrubel; Andrew Zein; Jane Fallon
- Camera setup: Multi-camera
- Running time: 30 minutes
- Production companies: Two Soups Productions; NBC Universal Television Studio

Original release
- Network: NBC
- Release: March 28 – May 2, 2006

Teachers is an American sitcom television series that aired on NBC. The show ran for six episodes from March 28 until its cancellation on May 2, 2006. Loosely based upon a 2001 UK series of the same name, it was developed by Matt Tarses, co-executive producer of the medical comedy Scrubs.

== Overview ==
Set in New Jersey, Teachers stars Justin Bartha as Jeff Cahill, a skilled, irreverent young English teacher at the fictitious Filmore High School, whose apparent apathy toward his job masks his actual wisdom concerning teaching at an underfunded school. Sarah Alexander co-stars as idealistic British history teacher Alice Fletcher, his only kindred spirit on the faculty, for whom Jeff also has romantic feelings. Alice does not reciprocate these feelings, but she is becoming fonder of him. Radio personality Phil Hendrie plays Dick Green, an apathetic phys-ed and physics teacher, who spends his afternoons behind the gym. Deon Richmond plays Calvin Babbitt, the drama teacher whose attitude about teaching falls somewhere between Jeff's and Alice's. He often gets caught up in Jeff's schemes. Kali Rocha stars as the uncaring, rule-abiding Principal Emma Wiggins. Matt Winston stars as Mitch Lenk, a math teacher and lap dog to Principal Wiggins. It is implied that he is romantically interested in her. Sarah Shahi stars as Tina Torres, an attractive teacher from Mexico. She is Alice's possible rival for Jeff's affections, though it seems Jeff prefers Alice. It is revealed in Episode 05 ("Testing 1-2-3") that she does not have her teaching license, having gone to school, but taking jobs before she took her finals. However, she stated later in the episode that she will be taking them.

== Cast ==
- Justin Bartha as Jeffrey "Jeff" Cahill
- Sarah Alexander as Alice Fletcher
- Phil Hendrie as Richard "Dick" Green
- Deon Richmond as Calvin Babbitt
- Kali Rocha as Emma Wiggins
- Sarah Shahi as Tina Torres
- Matt Winston as Mitchell "Mitch" Lenk

== Production ==
Like many American sitcoms, Teachers was shot before a studio audience.

The series began development under the title Filmore Middle, which reflected its original middle school setting.

Though adapted for American television by Matt Tarses, a writer and producer of the critically lauded series Sports Night and Scrubs, Teachers was panned by many critics (including the San Francisco Chronicle's Tim Goodman) as unoriginal and clichéd. The show was quickly cancelled by NBC, the news coming on May 15.

== Episodes ==
No.	Title	Directed by	Written by	Original release date	Prod. code	U.S. viewers (millions)	U.S. ratings/ share (18–49)
1	"Substitute"	James Burrows	Matt Tarses	March 28, 2006	101	6.71	3.3/8
After 6 months of unrequited flirting Jeff hits on Tina, the substitute history teacher, in an attempt to make Alice jealous. Calvin and Dick concoct a scheme to ensure Alice does not get elected faculty chair. After rebuffing him most of the day Tina reciprocates and ultimately offers Jeff a one-night stand. Realising his feelings for Alice are serious Jeff makes up an excuse to end the date before things go too far. When Jeff understands that Alice doesn't want to date someone who treats teaching like a joke Jeff admits that he is embarrassed that he enjoys teaching and that is why he acts like he doesn't take his job seriously.
2	"Field Trip"	Gail Mancuso	Michael Lisbe & Nate Reger	April 4, 2006	102	5.61	2.5/6
3	"Schoolympics"	Gail Mancuso	Ben Dougan & Robin Shorr	April 11, 2006	104	5.19	2.4/6
4	"Golf"	Gil Junger	Matt Tarses	April 18, 2006	105	4.50	2.2/5
5	"Testing"	Gil Junger	Alison McDonald	April 25, 2006	106	4.70	2.3/5
6	"Prom"	Gail Mancuso	Story by : Wil Calhoun; Teleplay by : Sherry Bilsing-Graham & Ellen Plummer	May 2, 2006	103	4.49	2.0/5

== Ratings ==
Based on average total viewers per episode of Teachers on NBC:

Timeslot (EDT)	Series Premiere	Series Finale	TV Season	Viewers (millions)	Rank	18-49 Rating/Share	Rank
Tuesday 9:30 P.M. (March 28, 2006 - May 2, 2006)	March 28, 2006	May 2, 2006	2005-2006	5.29	#108	2.5/6	#86
