= Go Fish (Buffy the Vampire Slayer) =

- Buffy the Vampire Slayer episode
- Episode no.: Season 2 Episode 20
- Directed by: David Semel
- Written by: David Fury; Elin Hampton
- Production code: 5V20
- Original air date: May 5, 1998

Guest appearances
- Charles Cyphers as Coach Carl Marin; Jeremy Vincent Garrett as Cameron Walker; Wentworth Miller as Gage Petronzi; Conchata Ferrell as Nurse Ruthie Greenliegh; Armin Shimerman as Principal Snyder; Danny Strong as Jonathan Levinson; David Patellis as Dodd McAlvy; Shane West as Sean

Episode chronology
← Previous "I Only Have Eyes for You"	Next → "Becoming"
- Buffy the Vampire Slayer season 2

Go Fish" is episode 20 of season two of the television series Buffy the Vampire Slayer. It was written by David Fury and Elin Hampton, directed by David Semel, and first broadcast on The WB on May 5, 1998. The episode featured Wentworth Miller in his debut TV performance.

Xander joins Sunnydale High School's Razorbacks swim team to find out why their best team members are being killed by horn-headed, ridge-skinned "gill monsters" (humanoid sea-creatures which look like the Creature from the Black Lagoon).

== Plot ==
Buffy and her friends attend a night-time victory party, in honor of the high school swim team, at Sunnydale State Beach. One of the swimmers, Cameron Walker, approaches Buffy and suggests that they get to know each other. Meanwhile, another team member, Dodd McAlvy, is dunking Jonathan Levinson's head into a barrel of water. Buffy pushes Dodd off, but Jonathan snaps that she should mind her own business. Meanwhile, swim champion Gage Petronzi suggests that he and Dodd go for a swim in the sea, with Dodd saying that Buffy creeps him out. He lags behind while Gage continues on, but when Gage smells something foul, (Note: An oft-quoted line of the episode is Gage's "Dude, what is that foulness?") he turns to see that all that remains of Dodd are his clothes and skin, while a monster rises from the mess and departs into a storm drain.

Willow enjoys her role as substitute teacher for the computer class after the death of Jenny Calendar, but Principal Snyder rebukes her for assigning Gage a failing grade because he refuses to do any schoolwork. Snyder tells her that she must show school spirit, and that student athletes are under extra pressures and deserve preferential treatment. Willow complains later that she's under orders to falsify Gage's grade; Xander agrees that it's unfair, while Cordelia advises them that winners are entitled to special privileges.

Buffy arrives at school in a car with Cameron. He makes persistent and unwelcome sexual advances, so Buffy slams his head against the steering wheel. Principal Snyder witnesses this and threatens Buffy not to harm their chances of a victory in the state championship. She is escorted along with Cameron to the school infirmary, where Cameron, Snyder, and Swim Coach Marin blame Buffy — and the way she dresses — for Cameron's injured nose, while Nurse Greenliegh gives him a cold pack for it.

Giles and the Scooby Gang decide to determine what killed Dodd. Xander bumps into Cameron, who rubs his elite status in Xander's face. After Cameron goes to the cafeteria for a snack, Xander hears him scream. Investigating, Xander finds a ransacked cafeteria, Cameron's skin, and a gill monster. In the library, Cordelia sketches the creature that Xander describes. Buffy and Willow return to report that Cameron and Dodd were the Razorbacks' two best swimmers; Gage was third, but is now their best. Having little else to go on, Buffy shadows Gage as the potential next target.

At the Bronze that night, Gage confronts Buffy about her following him; she tells him that he may be in danger. He does not believe her and leaves, only to be attacked by Angelus in the parking lot. Buffy fights off the vampire, noting as she does that Angelus was spitting out Gage's blood rather than drinking it. Gage asks Buffy to walk him home to keep him safe.

The following day, Buffy and Willow and Cordelia sit in on swim practice. They discuss Angelus' behavior, and speculate that the swim team may be taking steroids—which repel vampires, but attract gill monsters. Xander joins the swim team in order to get information from places the girls would not have access to.

Buffy hears Gage cry out in pain; she finds him and a teammate in the boys' locker room, transforming into two more of the creatures. Both monsters attack Buffy but they go away after Marin enters and chases them off. Buffy and Giles tell Coach Marin that members of his team are not being killed by the creatures, but are transforming into them. Meanwhile, Xander tries to find out what drug his teammates are taking, and how to get it. He finds out that the "steroids" are being pumped in with the sauna-steam; Xander is inhaling it as they speak.

It is revealed that Nurse Greenliegh works with Marin to conduct experiments on the swim team with fish DNA, in order to enhance the Razorbacks' performance. When Greenliegh insists they end the experiments, Marin forces her into an open grate leading to the sewers. The creatures attack and kill her.

Buffy talks with Marin about the experiments, but he suddenly pulls out a gun and he is able to force her into the sewer because the room is too narrow to try to evade bullets so she prefers to not risk attempting it. She is fighting the gill monsters when Xander enters, disarms and knocks out Marin. Xander pull Buffy from the sewer before Marin revives and bashes Xander's head in with a large wrench. Marin swings at Buffy next but misses and falls into the sewer where Marin's own creatures rip him to pieces. Xander and the surviving Razorbacks are given treatments to undo the effects of the inhaled mutagen. Meanwhile, the fully-transformed gill monsters head off to the open ocean, never to be seen again.

== Themes ==
"Go Fish" is an example of a Buffy episode showing negative consequences for drug use. It also includes the recurrent theme of Buffy's prospective boyfriends turning out to be monsters.

Roger Pocock condemned the simplistic drugs-are-bad theme:

[D]rama needs to say something more than that, because if the message is just "drugs are bad", then the only two responses from the viewer can be "yes, they are", or "no, they're not". That's not exactly engaging the brain. Instead, a show like this needs to say, "drugs are bad, because...". That 'because' needs to be something a bit more nuanced than "you'll turn into a monster", and then show us the Creature from the Black Lagoon. Show us addiction; show us psychological damage; show us the impact on friends and family..."

Theresa Basile, in a series about sexual consent issues in Buffy, addresses as problematic the scene in which "Cameron claims that Buffy led him on and gestures to her outfit, commenting on the way she dresses. Coach Marin tells Buffy to dress more appropriately." To Marin, "women are disposable, and he gets angry with them when they fail to show the proper school spirit and don't enjoy being victimized." Basile points out some elements contributing to "the tone of this episode and how it addresses victim-blaming and slut-shaming."

Sure, Cameron does have a broken nose and Buffy doesn't appear to be injured, but his word is automatically taken over hers. ... And all of the adults [including Giles, Principal Snyder and Nurse Greenliegh] are complicit in this victim-blaming. ... Being a former Queen Bee, Cordelia thinks that popular boys and girls deserve more than the "common wuss." But the sense of entitlement still perpetuates a rape culture. ... The episode is critical of these two things, but the tone of the story is so lighthearted and silly that I'm not sure the message gets across. It's hard to take victim-blaming seriously in an episode about fish monsters."

Buffy reviewer Justin Carreiro remarks, "If social media were around in 1998 in Sunnydale when this happened, Sunnydale High would've been drowning in bad PR. Cameron, Principal Snyder and Coach Marin would've rued the day they ever crossed or blamed Buffy."

== Cultural references ==
The episode shows obvious parallels to Creature from the Black Lagoon, while Cordelia mistakenly refers to The Blue Lagoon, a 1980 movie starring Brooke Shields.

Xander says of a monster attack, "This was no boating accident," a line from Jaws.

Willow says Oreo cookies have "chocolately-goodness." This in-joke alludes to the fact that Alyson Hannigan once did a commercial for Oreos.

== Reception ==
Reviewers generally called the episode "silly." Theresa Basile lists it among her "10 Underrated Episodes of Buffy the Vampire Slayer," calling it a "silly one-off" which "has the misfortune of being placed between "I Only Have Eyes for You" and the epic "Becoming" two-parter, and it suffers in comparison to those transformative stories. On its own, Go Fish is very entertaining. Xander wears a Speedo, Cordelia gives Xander a touching speech about how much she'll still like him and take care of him even if he's a fish monster, and Buffy gets to flirt with Wentworth Miller."

Vox ranked it at #139 on their "Every Episode Ranked From Worst to Best" list of all 144 episodes (to mark the 20th anniversary of the show), calling it "some of that dumb-but-fun stuff... a silly little piece of nothing about how steroids are bad."

Billie Doux called it a "completely silly and ridiculous episode jammed sideways into a season of spectacular Angel heaviness," with an enjoyable "transparent, over-the-top condemnation of athletes using performance-enhancing drugs and sliding through school without having to study."

Mike Loschiavo addressed the "dated and, frankly, more than a little awkward" handling of the themes of drugs and sexual assault, while praising the season's "amazing job at addressing real life concerns." "Less impressive is the silliness of a high school coach, probably working for close-to-free, also being a geneticist."
