= Entropy (Buffy the Vampire Slayer) =

- Buffy the Vampire Slayer episode
- Episode no.: Season 6 Episode 18
- Directed by: James A. Contner
- Written by: Drew Z. Greenberg
- Production code: 6ABB18
- Original air date: April 30, 2002

Guest appearances
- Amber Benson as Tara Maclay; Danny Strong as Jonathan Levinson; Adam Busch as Warren Mears; Tom Lenk as Andrew Wells; Kali Rocha as Halfrek; Edie Caggiano as Mother

Episode chronology
← Previous "Normal Again"	Next → "Seeing Red"
- Buffy the Vampire Slayer season 6

"Entropy" is the 18th episode of season 6 of the television series Buffy the Vampire Slayer. The episode aired on April 30, 2002 on UPN.

== Plot ==
The Trio, riding ATVs, pursue two vampires through a cemetery; one of them throws a tree branch at Andrew, causing him to fall off and the others to crash. The vampires encounter Buffy and they fight. One vampire drops the mysterious disk that the Trio were after; Warren snatches it and the Trio escapes, unseen by the Slayer. As Buffy fights, Spike seizes one of the vampires and offers to stake him, provided that Buffy agrees to tell the Scooby Gang about their sex life. Buffy stakes both vampires without Spike's help and dares him to spill the beans himself; since her friends have forgiven her attempt to kill them, a little dalliance is unlikely to make them hate her.

The next day, Willow waits for Tara outside of her classroom and the two talk and plan a coffee date. Buffy and Dawn stroll downtown, but there are very few stores where Dawn can show her face: she has confessed to shoplifting at most of them. They chat about all of the things Dawn stole and how they are working to remedy the whole problem.

Jonathan works on a project involving the disk they stole as Warren watches over, eager for it to be complete. While Jonathan finishes his work alone, Warren and Andrew Wells talk about their inability to trust Jonathan and how soon they will not need him anymore.

That evening, Xander comes home from work and finds Anya at his apartment waiting for him, having hid behind the bushes as he left the building the previous day. Xander tries to apologize for walking away from their wedding. There is a glimmer of hope for them until Xander says he wanted to stop the wedding before it happened. Taken aback, Anya asks Xander what he meant by that remark and asks if he still wants to marry her. Xander admits to loving her dearly and wanting to be back with her, but he is still too afraid of himself to marry her. With her back turned to Xander, she reveals her vengeance demon face and angrily begins to wish him physical harm – but nothing happens. Anya morphs back into her human face and, upset that her powers did not work, she leaves while a confused Xander looks on. The next day, Anya has coffee with Halfrek and the two demons talk about Anya's attempts at vengeance. Halfrek reminds Anya that she cannot grant her own wishes and must get someone else to wish Xander harm.

At the Summers house, Buffy makes pancakes for Dawn. Dawn realizes she is trying too hard to make up for what happened when she was insane, and eventually Buffy catches on to that reality as well. Dawn proposes the idea of joining Buffy on patrol so the two can spend some time together, but Buffy is not interested.

On their coffee date, Willow fills Tara in on all of the supernatural activities that Tara has missed over the past months. Anya interrupts them and tries to maneuver them into wishing harm to Xander. She does the same with Dawn at the Magic Box and with Buffy at home; but no one takes the bait. Xander shows up at Buffy's house and Anya leaves in a huff. Buffy talks him out of following Anya and he takes his aggressions out by kicking a lawn gnome on Buffy's front lawn. When Buffy does not recognize the decoration as something she put there, Xander examines it and finds that it contains a small camera. They guess that it was placed by Spike, who has more than once been caught watching the house in the past. Buffy confronts Spike at his crypt with the mini-camera she found. Spike denies planting the mini-camera, and he further insists that he would never do anything like that to hurt Buffy, because he believes that the love between them is real. Buffy denies being in love with Spike, which hurts him.

At the Magic Box, Anya complains to Halfrek that all the women she knows still love Xander too much to wish him harm, despite what he did to her. Halfrek tells Anya that she needs to find someone who hates Xander to make the wish – and at that moment Spike appears, seeking something to ease his pain. Anya remembers that Giles left something appropriate: a partial bottle of Evan Williams bourbon. After Halfrek leaves, Anya and Spike drink the whiskey and complain to each other about their respective relationship problems. Spike reiterates how he despises Xander, but Anya cannot get him to make a wish. Spike also tells Anya that he likes her forthrightness.

At Buffy's house, Willow uses her computer to try to trace the camera's signal. Given that it was not Spike, they correctly assume that the Trio are behind it. Jonathan completes his work with the disk, and uses it to highlight a spot on a map of Sunnydale. The Trio are delighted, until the map catches fire. This distracts them from a red light, flashing to announce that their network has been penetrated as Willow finds more camera feeds: the Trio are watching her classrooms, the Bronze, Xander's and Buffy's workplaces.

Spike and Anya seek comfort in each other's arms. Anya feels guilty about what happened with Xander and Spike consoles her, which leads to them having sex on a table, where Willow stumbles upon the Magic Box feed. After Andrew belatedly sees the intrusion alarm, Warren directs him to shut down the surveillance network, but they are captivated by the action on the Magic Box camera. Willow fails to keep Buffy, Xander and Dawn from seeing the feed, which enrages Xander. As a stunned Buffy sits in the back yard, Dawn follows her and they begin to talk about Buffy's affair with Spike. Their bonding moment is cut short as Willow informs them both that Xander has left with an axe.

After Spike and Anya awkwardly get dressed, Spike leaves the shop where Xander attacks him. Xander is about to stake Spike when Anya comes outside, trying to stop him; she distracts him long enough for Buffy to knock him out of the way. Xander argues with Anya, disgusted that she slept with Spike, who quietly remarks that he was good enough for Buffy. Xander tells Spike to leave Buffy out of it – then he and Anya see Buffy's startled face and connect the dots. This is too much for Xander; he drops the stake and walks away stunned. Buffy also walks off, angry at Spike for revealing their secret. Spike finally starts to make a wish, but Anya stops him, realizing that she caused too much damage.

Willow is sitting in her bedroom when Tara appears, saying that repairing their love will be a long process – which she would rather skip. They kiss.

== Reception ==
In 2023, Rolling Stone, raked this episode as #135 out of the 144 episodes in honor of 20th anniversary of the show ending.
