= Halfrek =

Fictional character

- Buffy the Vampire Slayer character
- Kali Rocha as Halfrek
- First appearance: "Fool for Love" (as Cecily) "Doublemeat Palace" (as Halfrek)
- Last appearance: "Selfless" (2002)
- Created by: Joss Whedon; Douglas Petrie; Jane Espenson
- Portrayed by: Kali Rocha

In-universe information
- Classification: Vengeance demon
- Notable powers: Wish-granting. Superhuman physical attributes, teleportation, telekinesis, invulnerability.

Halfrek or Hallie is a recurring fictional character on the television series Buffy the Vampire Slayer.

Halfrek is a vengeance demon and long-time associate of Anya Jenkins. The character appeared in seasons 6 and 7, and previously appeared as Cecily in season 5. She is played by actress Kali Rocha.

== Halfrek ==
Halfrek is a long-time associate and sometime friend of Anya, who knew her from her days as a vengeance demon. The two had worked together in the past, notably during the Russian Revolution of 1905. However, Halfrek's raison d'etre differed from Anya's. Whereas Anya was an avenger of scorned women, Halfrek's "thing" (as Anya put it) is to perform vengeance for children who have been wronged by their parents or guardians. Anya attributes this to "daddy issues". Even after Anya ceases to be a vengeance demon, she continues her friendship with Halfrek. Like Anyanka used the name Anya when masquerading as human, Halfrek's mortal persona goes by the name Hallie.

In her second appearance in season 6, Halfrek poses as a guidance counselor and coaxes Dawn into making a wish. Feeling that no one wants to spend time with her, Dawn wishes that people would never leave; Halfrek therefore casts a spell that prevents anyone from leaving the Summers residence. The crisis ends when Halfrek herself is caught in the spell and has to break it. Halfrek also appears as a bridesmaid at the failed wedding of Anya and Xander.

Early in season 7, Halfrek attempts to coax Anya back into vengeance, but Anya has spent too long as a mortal to return to her old life; while she was initially successful in her return to demonhood, she subsequently regrets the deaths she has caused. D'Hoffryn asks Anya what she wants, and she says that she wants to reverse the vengeance she had done. D'Hoffryn grants her wish, telling her that it'll require the sacrifice of a vengeance demon's body and soul. Believing she is about to die, Anya is resigned to her fate—only to watch helplessly as D'Hoffryn summons her friend Halfrek and incinerates her in front of Anya.

== Cecily ==
In the season 5 episode "Fool For Love", Halfrek uses the persona of Cecily while on a job to kill all the guests at a party Spike is attending. Cecily, being the upper-class object of the then-human William's affections in Victorian England circa 1880 spurns William's advances, saying he is "beneath her", and upsetting him greatly. This sets in motion the events that lead William to accept comfort from Drusilla, and become a vampire. (Cecily's surname was implied to be Underwood in the episode "Lies My Parents Told Me", but stated to be Addams in the script and credits of "Fool for Love" and the non-canon tie-in novel These Our Actors.)

== Identity ==
In the season 6 episode "Older and Far Away", Halfrek recognizes Spike and calls him by his human name, William. Spike also recognizes Halfrek, but when asked to explain this they both sheepishly deny being acquainted. This implies that Halfrek had previously been Cecily. However, Halfrek and Anya witnessed the Crimean War (circa 1853) which is mentioned in "Lessons" and shown in "Selfless". The timing of this event would indicate that Halfrek existed as a demon at least three decades prior to the adoption of the youthful human form in Cecily. Joss Whedon and Kali Rocha have both stated that, in their minds at least, Halfrek and Cecily were indeed the same entity.

Halfrek later appeared in the comic Spike: Old Times, which established that she was 'on a job' at the time that William fell for Cecily. She seems to have had at least some pity for William in spite of her rejection of him, as the night he became a vampire, she caused the deaths of the rude party-goers who had laughed at his poetry.

Continuity-wise, the comic story takes place in Buffy season 6, and assumes that Spike briefly left Sunnydale and visited Los Angeles.

== Appearances ==
Buffy the Vampire Slayer
Halfrek/Cecily has appeared in 7 Buffy episodes as a guest.

- Season 5: "Fool for Love" (as Cecily)
- Season 6: "Doublemeat Palace"; "Older and Far Away"; "Hell's Bells"; "Entropy"
- Season 7: "Lessons"; "Selfless"

== Reception ==
Halfrek is included in lists of underrated Buffyverse side characters.
