= I Only Have Eyes for You (Buffy the Vampire Slayer) =

- Buffy the Vampire Slayer episode
- Episode no.: Season 2 Episode 19
- Directed by: James Whitmore Jr.
- Written by: Marti Noxon
- Production code: 5V19
- Original air date: April 28, 1998

Guest appearances
- Meredith Salenger as Grace Newman; Christopher Gorham as James Stanley; John Hawkes as George the Janitor; Miriam Flynn as Ms. Frank; Brian Reddy as Police Chief Bob Munroe; James Marsters as Spike; Juliet Landau as Drusilla; Armin Shimerman as Principal Snyder; Brian Poth as Fighting Boy; Sarah Bibb as Fighting Girl; James Lurie as Mr. Miller; Ryan Taszreak as Ben; Anna Coman-Hidy as 50's Girl #1; Vanessa Bednar as 50's Girl #2

Episode chronology
← Previous "Killed by Death"	Next → "Go Fish"
- Buffy the Vampire Slayer season 2

"I Only Have Eyes for You" is episode 19 of season two of the television series Buffy the Vampire Slayer. It was written by Marti Noxon, directed by James Whitmore Jr., and first broadcast on April 28, 1998, on The WB. In the episode, Sunnydale High is haunted by the ghosts of a teacher and a student who fell in love years ago, recreating their tragedy by possessing the bodies of students and staff preparing for the upcoming Sadie Hawkins dance.

Written as a ghost story dealing with the themes of second chance and regret, the episode received positive reviews from critics.

== Plot ==
Buffy stops a male student from shooting a female student. Afterwards, they have no recollection of why they were arguing and the gun disappears. Principal Snyder blames Buffy for the incident. While waiting in his office, a yearbook from 1955 falls off the shelf. In class later that day, Buffy starts daydreaming about a relationship that a student had with his teacher. As she comes back to the present, she finds that her teacher has unknowingly written "Don't walk away from me, bitch!" on the black board, a line the male student had shouted. Later, Xander is grabbed by a monster arm from inside his locker. Buffy helps him break away, but the arm then disappears.

Giles is intrigued by the possible presence of a poltergeist. Later that night, Giles sees the janitor shoot a teacher, though only moments earlier they were cordial. Giles is convinced that Jenny Calendar is haunting the school.

Willow finds information on her laptop about a killing in 1955, where student James Stanley killed his teacher Grace Newman after she tried to break off their affair. In the cafeteria, chaos erupts as the food turns into snakes. Outside, Snyder talks to the police chief about the incident and it is revealed that they know about the Hellmouth under the school and the possibility of Buffy being the Slayer. Drusilla gets a vision about Buffy meeting with death.

Willow devises a plan to contain the spirits, and they head off to the school where they prepare, though Giles has already arrived and is trying to summon Jenny's spirit. Buffy hears music coming from the music room and sees Grace and James dancing there. James' face suddenly changes to a gory mess, startling Buffy. On the stairwell, Willow begins to sink into the floor and Giles saves her. Willow finally convinces him that the spirit is not Jenny. A swarm of wasps arrives and surrounds the school.

Everyone recuperates at Buffy's while she continues to show her anger towards James. Buffy goes to the kitchen where she finds a sign for the 1955 Sadie Hawkins dance in her pocket as James' voice whispers, "I need you." She heads to the school where the wasps part for her to enter. Willow finds the ad and everyone rushes after Buffy, but they cannot enter the school.

Angelus appears in the halls as Buffy, now possessed by James, talks to him as if he were Grace. They repeat the ghosts' argument until, at the climax, Buffy pulls out a gun and shoots Angelus. He falls off of the balcony as though dead. Buffy, still possessed by James, goes to the music room where "James" plans to kill himself. The possessed Angelus, being a vampire and thus immune to bullets, arrives just in time to stop Buffy from pulling the trigger. They exchange apologies and kiss. The spirits leave their bodies and are finally finding peace. Buffy and Angelus break away from the kiss, and Angelus, disgusted at what he has been doing, pushes Buffy away and flees. Angelus and Drusilla leave Spike after Angelus taunts him and Spike breaks free from his wheelchair.

== Production details ==
Scriptwriter Marti Noxon said that prior to working on Buffy, she had written several times about ghosts, which for her are figurative expressions of the need for "repentance and second chances", drawing on her own family background. "I realize that I was constantly telling the story of my family and fears," she says. Noxon was influenced in her storytelling by the movies Poltergeist and Truly, Madly, Deeply, which featured a widow who was unable to move on after the loss of her husband.

== Cultural references ==
In the episode "Out of Mind, Out of Sight," their English class discussed William Shakespeare's The Merchant of Venice. Here, Xander alludes to the play by saying, "The quality of mercy is not Buffy."

When Willow suggests an exorcism of the ghosts, Cordelia replies, "Are you crazy? I saw that movie. Even the priest died!" She refers to The Exorcist.

The website Women at Warp compares the "past love affair gone bad plays out again and again" theme with the Star Trek: The Next Generation episode "Eye of the Beholder." "In both episodes, the spirit left behind by a man whose love affair turned tragic inhabits the minds of key female characters. When Troi investigates a crew member's suicide, she becomes entranced by the telepathic memory of Lt. Pierce, who killed his lover and then killed himself. Seeing through his eyes, she seems to live out his memories, killing Lt. Worf then attempting to kill herself. In the Buffyverse, the ghost of a young man who—that's right—killed his lover then himself, causes Buffy to attempt to act out the same events with her lover, Angel. Both are ultimately saved by the lovers they thought they murdered."

== Reception ==
Vox rated it #45 in a list of all 144 episodes, writing, "The smart, moving twist, as penned by Marti Noxon, is that when Buffy and Angel (excuse me, Angelus) end up possessed, the gender roles are reversed, with Buffy consumed by the guilt and self-loathing James feels for killing the person he loved. It's an unexpected, effective window into Buffy's psyche in the aftermath of Angel's transformation, and while James's spirit eventually makes peace with his actions, the episode shows Buffy still has a long way to go toward forgiving herself for her part in Angel losing his soul."

The A.V. Club described the episode as "a really beautiful episode that raises the subtext of the season to the surface in a surprising and emotionally powerful way" and "a story about obsession and repetition". BBC praised the direction and the script, and said that "it's impossible not to be charmed by the whole picture. The ending, where Buffy and Angel re-enact James and Grace's final moments, is such a compelling twist that it suddenly seems that the rest of the episode was written to explain the finale, rather than the other way around." The review opined that the final scene of the episode, in which Spike regained his health, was a "very welcome development" but also an "ill-judged addition" because it broke the "spell" of the screenplay, and because it teased the season finale, it should have been used in the next episode.
