= Killed by Death (Buffy the Vampire Slayer) =

- Buffy the Vampire Slayer episode
- Episode no.: Season 2 Episode 18
- Directed by: Deran Sarafian
- Written by: Rob Des Hotel; Dean Batali
- Production code: 5V18
- Original air date: March 3, 1998

Guest appearances
- Kristine Sutherland as Joyce Summers; Richard Herd as Dr. Stanley Backer; Willie Garson as Security Guard; Andrew Ducote as Ryan; Juanita Jennings as Dr. Wilkinson; Robert Munic as Intern; Mimi Paley as Little Buffy; Denise Johnson as Celia; James Jude Courtney as Der Kindestod

Episode chronology
← Previous "Passion"	Next → "I Only Have Eyes for You"
- Buffy the Vampire Slayer season 2

"Killed by Death" is episode 18 of season two of Buffy the Vampire Slayer. It was written by Rob Des Hotel and Dean Batali, directed by Deran Sarafian, and first broadcast on The WB on March 3, 1998.

After flu lands Buffy in the hospital, she rescues fevered children from Der Kindestod, a demon that turns out to have killed her cousin when she was younger and which gave her a phobia of hospitals.

== Plot ==
Weak with flu, Buffy collapses after a fight with Angelus. She is admitted to the hospital, much against her will. Her mother reveals that Buffy has hated hospitals ever since she saw her beloved cousin, Celia, die in one when she was eight years old.

That night, in what may be a dream, Buffy sees a young boy, Ryan, being followed by a strange-looking creature. She then starts having flashbacks of Celia's time in the hospital. Buffy awakens and takes a walk down the hall where she sees two men remove a dead child from the children's ward. At the door, she overhears an argument between Dr. Backer and Dr. Wilkinson about Backer's experimental treatments on the kids. She meets Ryan who tells her that "Death" comes at night.

The next morning, Buffy tells her friends about the overheard conversation. Since she is forced to stay at the hospital, she plans to find out what the doctor is up to and Xander volunteers everyone's help. Cordelia and Xander sneak into the hospital's record room and search for records on the girl who died in the night. Meanwhile, Giles and Willow search for information at the school library.

Buffy visits Ryan who is drawing a picture of the monster she saw the night before. Willow finds that Dr. Backer has a long history of controversial experimental treatments and investigations into his practices. Dr. Backer goes to the children's ward with his latest experimental treatment. Before he can do anything, an invisible creature kills him as Ryan watches in terror.

In the morning, Buffy informs everyone that Dr. Backer is not the suspect and shows them Ryan's drawing of the creature. At the library, Cordelia finds a picture of Ryan's monster on the cover of a book; they learn that it is called Kindestod (German: 'the child's death'), a demon that absorbs the life force of sickly children, making it seem that they died of their illness. They report to Buffy by telephone, and she realises that Backer was murdered because he was curing the children and depriving the monster of food. Buffy also recognizes, to her horror, that this monster is what killed Celia whilst Buffy watched helplessly.

Buffy and Willow go to Dr. Backer's office, where they find that he was giving the children injections of the virus they already have, to stimulate their immune response. Buffy realizes that only feverish people can see the demon, so she decides to re-infect herself with the virus.

Buffy stumbles to the children's ward but finds all the children are gone. She sees Kindestod in the room and watches as it heads down to the basement. The children hide quietly, but Kindestod finds them and attacks Ryan. It begins to suck his life out, growing two protuberances from its eyes and attaching them to his forehead. Buffy arrives and fights Kindestod. Just as it is about to suck her life out, she snaps its neck. Later that day, Buffy finishes recuperating at home and Xander and Willow decide to keep her company. Buffy receives a bloody drawing from Ryan picturing how she killed the monster.

== Continuity ==
Xander's unresolved romantic feelings for Buffy, which began in Season 1, are brought up, first by Angelus when he attempts to enter Buffy's hospital room; Angelus taunts Xander about his love for Buffy and how it must irk him that Angel took Buffy's virginity. An annoyed Cordelia later tells Xander that his loyalty to Buffy is not attractive (his later love interest, Anya, will make similar complaints) and how she knows that he took friendship with Buffy as a way of being close to her, since she didn't see him in a romantic way. This may explain Xander's anger and frustration over Buffy's romantic choices throughout the series, as from his perspective ordinary guys like him don't seem to "do it" for her.

== Reception ==
Vox ranked it at #134 of all 144 episodes on their "Every Episode Ranked From Worst to Best" list (to mark the 20th anniversary of the show), explaining, "There are a lot of season two episodes that feel like leftovers from season one, but 'Killed by Death' actually is a season one leftover. It was written for a goofy, campy point in the series’ run, and then lightly revised for the darker second half of season two through the addition (most likely by Whedon) of a few scenes of Xander and Angel facing off at the hospital where a feverish Buffy is recovering. That’s probably why those scenes feel exponentially stronger than the rest of the episode — but the rest of the episode is still perfectly fun TV. Plus, Der Kindestod and his extendable eyeball stalks are genuinely creepy."

== See also ==
- The Sandman (short story)
