= D'Hoffryn =

- Buffy the Vampire Slayer character
- Andy Umberger as D'Hoffryn
- First appearance: "Doppelgangland" (1999)
- Last appearance: Own It (2016)
- Created by: Joss Whedon
- Portrayed by: Andy Umberger

In-universe information
- Affiliation: Arashmahaar
- Classification: Vengeance demon
- Notable powers: Wish-granting. Superhuman physical attributes, teleportation, telekinesis, invulnerability.

D'Hoffryn is a fictional character on Buffy the Vampire Slayer, played by Andy Umberger. He is a powerful entity high in the demonic hierarchy. He is the master of the vengeance demons, a cabal which includes humans who are "elevated" to demonic status and endowed with mystical powers enabling them to invoke revenge at the behest of mortals who believe they have been wronged. D'Hoffryn rules over a hell dimension known as Arashmahaar.

D'Hoffryn also appears in the comic books during the ninth season of Buffy the Vampire Slayer and acts as the main antagonist of the tenth season.

== Character History ==
=== Television ===
During the Dark Ages in Sweden a young woman named Aud comes to the attention of D'Hoffryn. Aud has recently used magic to turn her cheating boyfriend into a troll. (The character Aud is recognizable as Anya; her name is pronounced "odd"—this is a play on the fact that people are always telling Anya she is odd.) Impressed by her imaginative revenge, D'Hoffryn offers her a position as a vengeance demon, and she becomes "Anyanka," an avenger of scorned women. When Anyanka, under the guise of Anya, is robbed of her powers by Giles while attempting to exact vengeance on behalf of Cordelia, D'Hoffryn refuses to help her, leaving Anya stuck in a teenage body. In season 4, D'Hoffryn attempts to convince Willow to become a vengeance demon after Oz leaves her and a spell she casts goes awry, resulting in a series of disasters for her friends which D'Hoffryn assumes she has done on purpose. She declines, but D'Hoffryn leaves his talisman (a tool to summon him) in case she changes her mind.

In season 6, D'Hoffryn is a guest at the failed wedding of Anya and Xander. After Xander leaves Anya at the altar, D'Hoffryn reinstates her powers and the grief-stricken Anya once again becomes a vengeance demon.

Anya's second stint as a vengeance demon in season 7 proves short-lived, and after wreaking a terrible vengeance on several college males using a spider-like Grimslaw demon, Buffy confronts and fights her. Willow uses the talisman D'Hoffryn had given her to summon him, asking him to help put a stop to the fighting. D'Hoffryn asks Anya what she wants, and she says that she wants to reverse the vengeance she had done. D'Hoffryn grants her wish, telling her that it'll require the sacrifice of a vengeance demon's body and soul. Believing she is about to die, Anya is resigned to her fate only to watch helplessly as D'Hoffryn summons her friend Halfrek - another vengeance demon whose specialty is granting the wishes of unhappy children - and incinerates her instead. D'Hoffryn then leaves, disgusted with Anya, and implies about the First Evil. Episodes later, D'Hoffryn sends at least two demons to kill Anya, but they are both thwarted.

=== Literature ===
D'Hoffryn returns in Buffy the Vampire Slayer Season Nine as a member of Illyria's magic council bent on protecting whatever remains of magic following the destruction of the Seed of Wonder last season.

D'Hoffryn returns in Season Ten as the season's Big Bad. He starts working alongside the Scoobies to help facilitate the new rules of magic only to double-cross them in favour of keeping the Slayer Handbook for himself. Empowered by the Slayer Handbook, D'Hoffryn annihilates the demon lords opposing Buffy in addition to other members of the magic council, removing his rivals for the conquest of the world. He is assisted by the resurrected Anya and Jonathan Levinson who he transformed into a Vengeance demon before leading an attack on the Scooby Gang. However, Anya betrays D'Hoffryn to save Xander, and is then killed by D'Hoffryn, at which point Jonathan and the other vengeance demons abandon him to be slain by Buffy.

== Appearances ==
=== Television ===
- Season 3: "Doppelgangland"
- Season 4: "Something Blue"
- Season 6: "Hell's Bells"
- Season 7: "Selfless"

=== Comic Books ===
- Season 9: "Welcome to the Team: Parts 1-2", "The Core: Parts 1-3,5"
- Season 10: "New Rules: Part 5", "I Wish: Parts 1-2", "Day Off (or Harmony In My Head)", "Old Demons: Part 3", "In Pieces on the Ground: Parts 2-5", "Own It, Parts 1-2,4-5"
