= Normal Again =

- Buffy the Vampire Slayer episode
- Episode no.: Season 6 Episode 17
- Directed by: Rick Rosenthal
- Written by: Diego Gutierrez
- Production code: 6ABB17
- Original air date: March 12, 2002

Guest appearances
- Danny Strong as Jonathan Levinson; Adam Busch as Warren Mears; Tom Lenk as Andrew Wells; Dean Butler as Hank Summers; Michael Warren as Doctor; Kirsten Nelson as Lorraine Ross; Amber Benson as Tara Maclay; Kristine Sutherland as Joyce Summers; Sarah Scivier as Nurse; Rodney Charles as Orderly; April Dion as Kissing Girl

Episode chronology
← Previous "Hell's Bells"	Next → "Entropy"
- Buffy the Vampire Slayer season 6

"Normal Again" is the 17th episode of season 6 of the television series Buffy the Vampire Slayer. The episode aired on March 12, 2002, on UPN. The Futon Critic named it the 35th best episode of 2002.

The Trio summon a demon whose hallucinogenic venom makes Buffy believe that her implausible and nightmarish life as vampire slayer has actually been her own elaborate hallucination as a mental patient, catatonic in a hospital for the past six years.

== Production details ==
According to Joss Whedon, this episode was the "ultimate postmodern look at the concept of a writer writing a show", as it questioned fantastical or inconsistent elements of the show "the way any normal person would". Whedon added that the episode is intentionally left open to interpretation; the actual cause of the delusions, either the poison or Buffy's return to "reality", is not made explicitly clear. "If the viewer wants," Whedon says, "the entire series takes place in the mind of a lunatic locked up somewhere in Los Angeles... and that crazy person is me." Although, "Personally, I think it really happened."

Producer/writer Marti Noxon commented, "It was a fake out; we were having some fun with the audience. I don't want to denigrate what the whole show has meant. If Buffy's not empowered then what are we saying? If Buffy's crazy, then there is no girl power; it's all fantasy. And really the whole show stands for the opposite of that, which is that it isn't just a fantasy. There should be girls that can kick ass. So I'd be really sad if we made that statement at the end. That's why it's just somewhere in the middle saying "Wouldn't this be funny if ...?" or "Wouldn't this be sad or tragic if...?" In my feeling, and I believe in Joss' as well that's not the reality of the show. It was just a tease and a trick".

== Cultural references ==
The website Women at Warp compares the "none of this is real" theme with the Star Trek: The Next Generation episode "Frame of Mind." "One of the series' most controversial episodes, "Normal Again" finds Buffy shifting between two worlds: one where her friends and monsters she's battled are real, and one where doctors in a mental health facility try to convince her that those same friends and monsters are actually figments of her imagination. It's a powerful episode, and it's also a plot we've seen before on TNG, when Riker is held captive during a reconnaissance mission, and his captors act as doctors to make him believe that his experiences aboard The Enterprise were all in his mind."
