= Revelations (Buffy the Vampire Slayer) =

- Buffy the Vampire Slayer episode
- Episode no.: Season 3 Episode 7
- Directed by: James A. Contner
- Written by: Doug Petrie
- Production code: 3ABB07
- Original air date: November 17, 1998

Guest appearances
- Serena Scott Thomas as Gwendolyn Post; Eliza Dushku as Faith Lehane; Jason Hall as Devon MacLeish; Kate Rodger as Paramedic

Episode chronology
← Previous "Band Candy"	Next → "Lovers Walk"
- Buffy the Vampire Slayer season 3

"Revelations" is the seventh episode of season three of the television show Buffy the Vampire Slayer. It was written by Doug Petrie, directed by James A. Contner, and first broadcast on The WB on November 17, 1998.

A new Watcher comes to town, looking for a device of great power. The Scoobies learn that Angel has returned from a hell dimension.

== Plot ==
Gwendolyn Post arrives unannounced as Faith's new Watcher. She is British, rude, confident, and looks down on all the Scoobies, especially Giles. She warns them that the demon Lagos is in Sunnydale looking for the Glove of Myhnegon, a powerful gauntlet.

While doing research, Xander and Willow kiss for a second time. At the Bronze, Cordelia and Oz notice that they seem unusually nervous, but Buffy and Faith appear at their sides for long enough to distract attention from their behavior. Xander goes looking for the Glove of Myhnegon, but sees Angel, of whose resurrection the Scoobies had been unaware. Xander follows Angel, hoping to stake him, but observes Angel and Buffy kissing. Angel shows Buffy that he has recovered the Glove. As Giles is meeting with Gwendolyn, Xander arrives to tell him about Angel. Gwendolyn does not overhear the conversation, but knows that they are keeping something from her.

The next morning, the gang stages an intervention with Buffy. Both Xander and Cordelia are openly hostile about Angel and see him as a serious threat, unable to separate him from the recent misdeeds of Angelus. Willow is less sure and advises caution, partly motivated by guilt about her secret romantic indiscretions with Xander. Buffy tells them that Angel has the Glove and that they are going to destroy it. Giles ultimately comes to Buffy's defense, but in private scolds her for not telling him about Angel's return.

Gwendolyn goes to visit Faith at the motel and mentions that Giles is having a secret meeting with Buffy and her friends. The angry Faith ends up at the Bronze with Xander, who tells her that Angel is alive and has the Glove, adding that Buffy knew about Angel's return and possession of the Glove but tried to keep it secret. The two nurse their grudges together; Faith decides to slay Angel and Xander eagerly volunteers to accompany her.

Giles tells Gwendolyn where the Glove is, and that "a friend of Buffy's" has it. He wants to discuss destroying it with her, but when he turns his back, Gwendolyn bludgeons him, knocking him out. In the cemetery, Willow is on the verge of telling Buffy about herself and Xander when the demon Lagos approaches the crypt, and Buffy kills him. Xander and Faith hurry to the library to get weapons, but they find Giles unconscious and gravely injured; Xander calls an ambulance. Faith assumes that Angel attacked Giles, but Xander thinks it unlikely as there are no bite marks. Faith leaves to hunt down Angel. Xander tells Buffy about Faith's goal. Gwendolyn shows up at the mansion first and tries to kill Angel, not knowing that he is a vampire. Faith arrives as Angel is fighting with Gwendolyn. She assumes Angel is after the Glove and attacks him. Buffy attempts to stop her, but Gwendolyn tells Faith to attack Buffy, and the two slayers fight.

Having successfully distracted the slayers and enlisted the help of Xander and Willow, Gwendolyn puts on the Glove and tests its power to manipulate lightning. The gang now realize who the real enemy is, and unite against her. Angel saves Willow from Gwendolyn's lightning bolt attack. Faith draws her fire, which allows Buffy to throw a piece of glass to sever her gloved arm, leading to Gwendolyn's death by electrocution when the next bolt of lightning strikes.

Buffy reconciles with her friends, who show willingness to forgive Angel. Giles finds out Gwendolyn was kicked out of the Watchers' Council 'for misuses of dark power' and went rogue. Buffy tries to reason with Faith, who is thrown and confused by Post's betrayal and unable to trust anyone.

== Production ==
=== Writing ===
According to The Monster Book, writer Doug Petrie originally envisioned the Glove of Myhnegon as a "demonic falconer's glove," which, "[w]hen you put it on and raised your arm, this huge, dark cloud would burst through the ceiling and take the form of a bird that spits fire." This was deemed unfilmable. Petrie also said that there was debate as to whether Gwendolyn Post would be human or demon.

== Reception ==
Vox ranked it at #75 of all 144 episodes on their "Every Episode Ranked From Worst to Best" list, writing, "Everyone cares about each other, everyone's extremely upset, and everyone's a little bit right. It's a lovely, graceful exploration of character dynamics in a way only Buffy can quite pull off. Plus, this episode features the first Faith/Buffy fight, and that's always a great well to draw from."

Valerie Frankel described the episode's villain, Gwendolyn Post, as "arguably the most powerful woman of the show". She said that while Post appears to be the strong female mentor that Buffy and Faith otherwise lack, it is significant that "innocent Willow", who represents Buffy's sensitive side, is threatened by her. Noel Murray of The A.V. Club said the final battle was predictable, but praised the scene where Post puts on the glove and has her arm severed by Buffy.

== Notes ==
1.Christopher Golden, Stephen R. Bissette, and Thomas E. Sniegoski. The Monster Book. Simon & Schuster, 2000.
