= Bargaining (Buffy the Vampire Slayer) =

- Buffy the Vampire Slayer episodes
- Episode nos.: Season 6 Episodes 1 & 2
- Directed by: David Grossman
- Written by: Marti Noxon (Part 1); David Fury (Part 2)
- Production code: 6ABB01 & 6ABB02
- Original air date: October 2, 2001

Guest appearances
- Anthony Stewart Head as Rupert Giles (Part 1 only); Franc Ross as Razor; Amber Benson as Tara Maclay; Geoff Meed as Mag; Mike Grief as Klyed; Paul Greenberg as Shempy Vamp (Part 1 only); Joy DeMichelle Moore as Ms. Lefcourt (Part 1 only); Bru Muller as Mr. Davis (Part 1 only); Robert Vito as Cute Boy (Part 1 only); Harry Johnson as Parent #1 (Part 1 only); Kelly Lynn Warren as Parent #2 (Part 1 only); Hila Levy as Pretty Girl (Part 1 only); Richard Wharton as Homeowner (Part 2 only)

Episode chronology
← Previous "The Gift"	Next → "After Life"
- Buffy the Vampire Slayer season 6

"Bargaining" is the two-part season premiere of season 6 of the television series Buffy the Vampire Slayer, consisting of the first and second episodes. They are also the 101st and 102nd episodes of the show overall. The two constituent episodes were both aired on October 2, 2001 on UPN. The episodes were written by Marti Noxon and David Fury and directed by David Grossman.

The Scooby Gang resurrects Buffy Summers (Sarah Michelle Gellar), after her death in the previous episode. Rupert Giles (Anthony Stewart Head) returns to England, and a group of biker demons wreak havoc on Sunnydale.

== Plot ==
=== Part 1 ===
With Buffy having been dead for five months, the Scooby Gang continue to patrol, led by Willow, whose power is progressing steadily. They use the often-imperfect Buffybot to conceal Buffy's death from any lurking enemies, as well as from social workers who believe Buffy to be Dawn's guardian. Meanwhile, at the magic shop, Giles is packing up his items in preparation for his return to England.

Willow announces plans to resurrect Buffy by magic with Anya having found the last mystical artifact Willow needs on eBay. She conceals her intentions, however, from Giles, Spike, and Dawn. A vampire survives his encounter with the Buffybot and realizes the real Slayer is gone. He tells a demon biker gang, which sets out to attack Sunnydale. Willow slaughters a baby deer in preparation for her ritual of resurrection. Giles leaves for England.

Willow, Xander, Anya, and Tara gather at Buffy's grave and Willow begins the ritual. As it progresses, the demon bikers wreak havoc in the town and damage the Buffybot when she intervenes. They trail the Buffybot as she tries to find Willow, interrupting the ritual at its conclusion. After the bikers destroy an essential artifact of the resurrection spell, the Scooby gang members flee in multiple directions from the attacking demons, convinced the ritual has failed. Unbeknownst to them, Buffy has been resurrected and has awakened, still buried in her coffin.

=== Part 2 ===
Xander carries Willow to the magic shop where Tara and Anya are to meet them. The demon bikers batter the Buffybot. The resurrected Buffy breaks out of her coffin and claws her way to the surface, confused and traumatized. Spike steals a motorcycle from a demon and rides off with Dawn, intent on escaping the demons still rampaging through Sunnydale.

The disoriented Buffy roams through the town, coming upon demon bikers - Hellions - as they complete the destruction of the Buffybot. As she flees them, she stumbles across Willow and her allies, but runs from them as well. As they pursue her, they are attacked by the demons, but Buffy turns and defeats them, then runs again. The biker leader wakes and attacks Xander and the others. Willow uses magic against him and, when he turns to attack Willow, it is Tara who kills him with an axe. Spike and Dawn find the head of the destroyed Buffybot. As Spike investigates her, the head suggests to Dawn the real Buffy has returned; distraught, she runs away.

Still in shock, Buffy returns alone to the site of her death, the top of Glory's tower. Dawn finds her there and climbs the unstable structure in pursuit. Buffy prepares to restage her death, but Dawn interrupts and tries to convince her to come down. Still confused, Buffy asks if she is in hell. As the tower collapses, Buffy's instinct to protect Dawn takes control, and she carries her sister down a rope to the ground.

== Reception ==
The two-hour season premiere of "Bargaining, Parts One and Two" on UPN attracted 7.7 million viewers, the 2nd highest viewership the show has ever received, behind only Season 2's "Innocence".
