= After Life (Buffy the Vampire Slayer) =

- Buffy the Vampire Slayer episode
- Episode no.: Season 6 Episode 3
- Directed by: David Solomon
- Written by: Jane Espenson
- Production code: 6ABB03
- Original air date: October 9, 2001

Guest appearances
- Amber Benson as Tara Maclay; Lisa Hoyle as Demon

Episode chronology
← Previous "Bargaining"	Next → "Flooded"
- Buffy the Vampire Slayer season 6

"After Life" is the third episode of season 6 of the television series Buffy the Vampire Slayer, and the 103rd episode of the series. It was written by Jane Espenson and directed by David Solomon, and aired on October 9, 2001, on UPN.

== Plot ==
The Scooby Gang rushes to find Buffy and figures she is at her house. The bikers are on the run now that Razor has been destroyed. At the house, Buffy is confused, and Dawn tells her Giles has left. Spike arrives, angry and looking for Dawn. When he realizes Buffy is back, he softens and helps clean her wounded hands. When the Scooby Gang arrives, Spike slips out.

Unable to stand all the concern, Buffy goes upstairs while Xander and Anya leave for food. Outside, the two find a hurt Spike who is furious that he was not told about the resurrection plans despite having helped the gang all summer. He warns Xander of the consequences they will have to face with magic.

After notifying Giles of Buffy's return, Willow and Tara go to bed and talk about the spell and changes in Buffy. In her room, Buffy looks at the pictures surrounding her and they briefly turn to pictures of skulls. During the night, Willow and Tara are visited in their room by a Buffy who yells at them and hints at Willow killing the deer for the ritual. When the girls get up to investigate, Buffy is asleep in her room and neither knows the source of the incident. A moving lump appears in the ceiling, motivating Willow to call Xander. While Xander talks, Anya enters the room with a knife and smoky eyes, slitting her cheek before collapsing.

The gang gather the next day at The Magic Box for brainstorming, but Buffy is still very closed off and leaves to patrol alone. With Buffy gone, the demon takes over Dawn, shouts at her friends and breathes fire before collapsing. Buffy finds Spike at his crypt and the two talk. Spike opens up to her, expressing his guilt for not being able to save her.

Led on by Spike's hint, Xander questions Willow and Tara. Willow reveals that this creature was created by the spell that brought Buffy back. The demon does not possess a body, which is why it has been possessing members of the gang. A reversal of the spell will cancel out the creation of the demon, but it cannot be done without reversing Buffy's resurrection. After Dawn panics at losing Buffy again, Willow discovers that the demon can only survive if Buffy is killed. The demon, which had been housed in Xander's body while Willow shared this information, heads for the Slayer. Buffy is attacked by the formless demon. Willow and Tara cast a spell to make the demon solid, and Buffy kills it with an axe.

Normality is somewhat resumed as Dawn heads to school the next day and Buffy sees her off. Buffy visits her friends and tells them she was in Hell during her death and appreciates that they brought her back. However, when Buffy goes outside and finds Spike hiding in a patch of shade, she admits to him that she was actually in Heaven and was happy. Spike is shocked as she relays that feeling the loss of Heaven, where she felt safe, loved, and complete, is Hell, and she stresses that her friends can never know the truth, that their efforts to rescue her cost her eternal bliss.
