= Lovers Walk =

- Buffy the Vampire Slayer episode
- Episode no.: Season 3 Episode 8
- Directed by: David Semel
- Written by: Dan Vebber
- Production code: 3ABB08
- Original air date: November 24, 1998

Guest appearances
- James Marsters as Spike; Kristine Sutherland as Joyce Summers; Harry Groener as Mayor Richard Wilkins; Jack Plotnick as Deputy Mayor Allan Finch; Marc Burnham as Lenny; Suzanne Krull as Clerk

Episode chronology
← Previous "Revelations"	Next → "The Wish"
- Buffy the Vampire Slayer season 3

"Lovers Walk" is episode eight of season three of the television show Buffy the Vampire Slayer. It was written by Dan Vebber, directed by David Semel, and first broadcast on The WB on November 24, 1998.

The vampire Spike returns to Sunnydale and kidnaps Willow to make her do a love spell, so that he can get back together with his lover Drusilla. Oz and Cordelia are very upset to see Xander and Willow kiss.

== Plot ==
Buffy's unexpectedly high SAT score makes her start to think about the college opportunities open to her. That night, Spike returns to Sunnydale.

At school the next day, Giles prepares to leave for a Watchers' retreat and urges Buffy go to an out-of-state college if she wants to. Besides, they have secondary Slayer Faith to fill in for her while she's away at college. He warns Buffy about seeing Angel and she promises that nothing will happen between them. Xander tells Willow that he wishes that they could just get rid of their mutual attraction.

Willow goes to a local magic shop looking for ingredients to an anti-love spell. Spike, who is hiding at the back of the shop, decides that a spell to make Drusilla love him again would be a good idea. He kills the shopkeeper.

At school Willow works on her anti-love spell while arguing with Xander. Spike knocks Xander unconscious, before taking them both back to the factory to help with his love spell. When Willow tells Spike that she does not have enough ingredients, he goes to collect what she needs.

At the library, Buffy is working out when her mom calls to discuss her college plans. Buffy hears Spike's voice in the background and immediately runs home, thinking her mom is in danger. Angel sees Joyce and Spike talking in the kitchen and attempts to attack Spike, but cannot enter the house because he is not invited. Joyce, thinking Angel is still evil, backs away while Angel begs her to invite him in. Buffy arrives, shoves Spike onto the table and invites Angel in. Spike tells them he has got her friends and the three of them leave to get the supplies that Willow needs.

As Oz and Cordelia are driving to find Giles, Oz's werewolf-enhanced sense of smell catches Willow's scent and can tell that she is afraid. Willow and Xander, believing themselves about to die, kiss just as Oz and Cordelia arrive to rescue them. Cordelia is horrified and runs up the stairs, but the stairs collapse and she is impaled on a piece of rebar.

As they leave with the supplies, Buffy, Angel and Spike are attacked by a welcoming committee of vampires sent by the Mayor. Spike, exhilarated by the thrill of the fight, realizes that the way to get Drusilla back is not via a love spell, but to become the demon he once was, whom she loved.

Willow tells Buffy that Cordelia survived the fall, but is in the hospital, having lost a lot of blood. When Xander takes her flowers, Cordelia tells him to stay away from her. Buffy tells Angel that the only way they can continue to see each other is if he tells her that he does not love her, something he cannot do. A happy and confident Spike is seen driving out of Sunnydale on his way to find Drusilla.

== Production details ==
=== Writing ===
"Lovers Walk" was screenwriter Dan Vebber's first script for the show. The title of the episode has been cited as "Lovers Walk", "Lover's Walk" and "Lovers' Walk", but according to Rhonda Wilcox, "the script apparently does not carry an apostrophe ... making for a short, sad, declarative sentence for a title".

The characters Spike and Drusilla were inspired by the Sex Pistols bass guitarist Sid Vicious, and his girlfriend Nancy Spungen.

=== Accompanying Sweepstakes ===
When "Lovers Walk" aired in the U.S., it was immediately followed by a 30-second advertisement for an "A Buffy Christmas: Win a Role on Buffy" sweepstakes produced by The WB. Fans who called 1-800-Collect were able to win a cameo appearance. The commercial, an ad for the Christmas episode "Amends," featured Sarah Michelle Gellar and David Boreanaz, playing their respective characters Buffy and Angel, and offering a prize of a walk-on part in the upcoming episode "The Prom." The winner of the competition was Jessica Johnson of Maryland, who won a three-day trip for two to participate. The commercial can be seen here.

== Continuity ==
Willow wears a fuzzy pink sweater. In the Season 4 episode "The Initiative", Spike tells Willow, "I'd bite you in a heartbeat. Thought about it. Remember last year, you had on that fuzzy pink number with the lilac underneath?"

Xander says to Willow, "Have you forgotten that I tend to have bad luck with these sorts of spells?" referring to the love spell cast by Amy Madison in "Bewitched, Bothered and Bewildered."

== Reception ==
"Lovers Walk" was nominated for an Emmy Award for Outstanding Sound Editing in a Series.

Vox ranked it at #24 of all 144 episodes on their "Every Episode Ranked From Worst to Best" list (to mark the 20th anniversary of the show), writing, "By episode’s end, in true Whedonesque fashion, everyone is utterly miserable... It dissolves all the core romantic relationships of the show — and sets up the eventual return of Spike, cured of his lovesickness through his yen for violence and back to his old, evil self." Paste Magazine, in a similar list, ranked it at #31 and called it "one of Season Three’s most emotionally resonant (read: tragic) episodes."

Roger Pocock writes, "Spike is back, and immediately the series hits a level of fun that it simply can’t achieve without him. ... There is something accidentally joyous about seeing Joyce becoming a kind of mother figure to Spike, listening to his troubles, feeding him little marshmallows and giving him advice, and then we can’t help but share Spike’s enjoyment at Angel not being able to get into the house. ... He also creates a situation that leads to the end of every relationship in the show."

Myles McNutt writes, "If you’re going to have Xander and Willow get to second base within a 'Monster of the Week' story, it needs to be one that doesn’t feel like they’ve been possessed or that it was entirely a heat of the moment decision. Here, because Spike is back in town in a self-destructive and depressive mood driven by the inherently human emotion of love, it allows the show to create some substantial threats while remaining grounded in something emotional rather than demonic."
