= Passion (Buffy the Vampire Slayer) =

- Buffy the Vampire Slayer episode
- Episode no.: Season 2 Episode 17
- Directed by: Michael Gershman
- Written by: Ty King
- Production code: 5V17
- Original air date: February 24, 1998

Guest appearances
- Kristine Sutherland as Joyce Summers; Robia LaMorte as Jenny Calendar; Richard Assad as Shopkeeper; James Marsters as Spike; Juliet Landau as Drusilla; Danny Strong as Jonathan Levinson; Richard Hoyt Miller as Policeman

Episode chronology
← Previous "Bewitched, Bothered and Bewildered"	Next → "Killed by Death"
- Buffy the Vampire Slayer season 2

"Passion" is the seventeenth episode of the second season of the fantasy-horror television series Buffy the Vampire Slayer (1997-2003). The episode was written by Ty King and directed by Michael Gershman, who served as the show's cinematographer. It originally aired on The WB in the United States on February 24, 1998.

The premise of Buffy the Vampire Slayer is that an adolescent girl, Buffy Summers, is chosen by mystical forces and given superhuman powers to kill vampires, demons, and other evil creatures in the fictional town of Sunnydale. She is supported by a close circle of friends, nicknamed the Scooby Gang. In "Passion", Buffy attempts to protect herself and her close ones from Angelus and his murderous intent as Jenny Calendar continues to search for a spell to restore his soul.

== Plot ==
Buffy wakes to find an envelope on her pillow containing a charcoal drawing of herself sleeping. Buffy asks Giles if there is a spell to reverse Angel's invitation into her house.

Buffy explains to her mother that she has been having problems with Angel, whom she describes as an abusive ex-boyfriend. Later that night, Willow discovers that Angelus has been in her room too, leaving behind a sick gift of her dead goldfish hanging from a fishing line. Drusilla has a vision showing someone attempting to break up the newly reunited vampire family. Jenny goes to a Gypsy novelty shop to buy an Orb of Thesulah.

Buffy confronts Jenny and explains that Giles misses her. Giles tells Buffy that he has found a ritual to revoke a vampire's invitation. Joyce finds Angelus waiting for her in the front yard. He starts to follow her into the house, but is unable to cross the threshold. Willow is shown reciting the ritual, and Buffy shuts the door in his face.

When Giles finds Jenny working late at the school, he invites her to call at his house when she has finished. Jenny completes her translation of a ritual's text that, along with the Orb of Thesulah, will restore Angelus' soul. She jumps when she notices Angelus sitting in the dark at the back of the room. He smashes the Orb of Thesulah and snaps Jenny's neck.

Giles returns home to find the place decorated in a romantic setting with candles, wine and rose petals. As Giles follows the trail he finds Jenny's lifeless body. Angelus lurks outside Buffy's house and watches with glee as a devastated Buffy and Willow are informed of Jenny's death over the phone. Giles returns to his apartment to arm for battle.

At the factory, there is an explosive crash as the long dining table erupts in flame. Angelus, Drusilla, and Spike recoil and move to escape. Giles attacks Angelus with a flaming baseball bat. Angelus grabs him by the throat and lifts him clear off the floor as Buffy enters the fray. She breaks Giles free of Angelus' grasp and fights Angelus, managing to get the upper hand before delivering a rage-fuelled beating. However Angelus turns her attention to the unconscious Giles, now completely surrounded by flames. As Angelus makes his escape, Buffy jumps down and half-carries Giles from the building. Outside, Giles angrily tells Buffy this wasn't her fight however she hits him before the two collapse in tears, as Buffy tells Giles she can't afford to lose him.

At Jenny's grave, Buffy apologizes for not being able to kill Angelus when she had the chance but now knows she is able to as the man she loved is gone. The next day at the school, as Willow sets her books on the desk, the backup disk containing the translated ritual slides and falls into the narrow space between the desk and a filing cabinet.

== Production ==
=== Writing ===
Alyson Hannigan said in an interview that the cast knew Angelus "had to kill somebody we loved - we were all warned about that. Actually, I think it was supposed to be Oz that was killed, then they decided they'd keep Oz around and they killed Ms. Calendar."

== Themes ==
According to Noel Murray from The A.V. Club, a recurring theme in "Passion" is "the common feeling of being left out".

== Continuity ==
The Orb Of Thesulah is the key to translating the Transliteration Annals for the Rituals of the Undead. These texts contain the spell to restore a soul to the undead, but were lost. The owner of the Occult shop tells Jenny that he sold an Orb to someone who was going to use it as a paperweight. In "Becoming Part 1," Giles says to Willow that he has an Orb Of Thesulah, which he uses as a paperweight.

After the lair at the factory burns down, Angelus lives in a mansion on Crawford Street when he returns from Hell in Season 3's "Faith, Hope & Trick," until he moves to L.A. in "Graduation Day (Part 2)."

== Reception ==
Vox ranked it at #12 on their "Every Episode Ranked From Worst to Best" list, calling it "the episode that makes it clear the transformation that occurred in "Innocence" is permanent: Angel really did go evil, and bad things really are going to happen on this show, and they won’t always be reversible. But they will lead to beautiful, heartbreaking moments of catharsis, like Buffy and Giles breaking down together in front of the burned-out factory while Buffy sobs, 'I can't do this without you.'"

Myles McNutt writes, "The episode is interested in what is to this point the most substantial death in the series, certainly, but it’s also interested in explaining how it is that Angel perceives this death, and how he sadistically uses it just to torment Buffy and to cause suffering. It’s a unique structure that make the episode something more than just another stop on the season’s arc, and really encapsulates how the demonic is colliding with humanity in a more substantial fashion at this stage in the season."
