= Michael Gershman (director) =

American cinematographer and television director

- Born: Michael Edward Gershman; June 17, 1944; St. Louis, Missouri
- Died: March 10, 2018 (aged 73); Malibu, California
- Occupations: Cinematographer, television director
- Years active: 1969–2003

Michael Edward Gershman (June 17, 1944 – March 10, 2018) was an American cinematographer and television director.

He was born on June 17, 1944, to Edward Gershman, a TV producer and his wife, Norine. He was raised in St. Louis. Soon after graduation from Ladue Horton Watkins High School, Gershman moved to Los Angeles.

He is best known for his work on the series Buffy the Vampire Slayer. Gershman made his directorial debut in the series with the episode "Passion". He was nominated for a Primetime Emmy Award in 2000 for "Outstanding Cinematography for a Single Camera Series" for his work on the episode "Hush". He also served as a director and cinematographer for the series Crossing Jordan.

Gershman spent more than forty years working as a cinematographer and camera operator in motion pictures. Among the films he worked on are Days of Heaven, The Deer Hunter, Heaven's Gate, Midnight Run and We Were Soldiers. He died in Malibu, California at the age of 73, on March 10, 2018.
