= Kali Rocha =

American actress (born 1971)

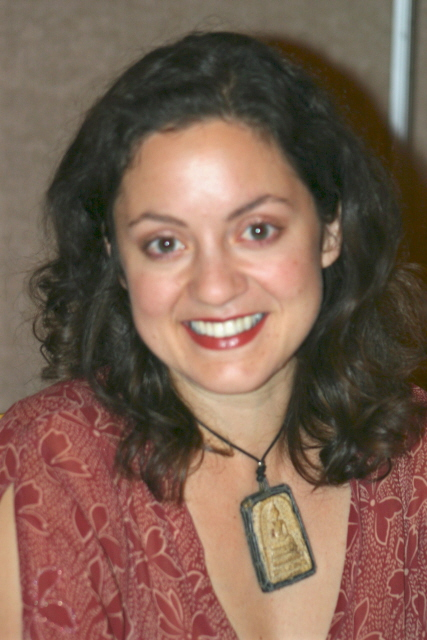
- Rocha in 2005
- Born: December 5, 1971 (age 54); Memphis, Tennessee, U.S.
- Education: Carnegie Mellon School of Drama
- Occupation: Actress
- Years active: 1996–present
- Spouse: Michael Krikorian (m. 2006)
- Children: 2

Kali Rocha (born December 5, 1971) is an American actress. She is known for portraying Karen Rooney, the mother of the four Rooney children and the school's vice principal, on the Disney Channel sitcom Liv and Maddie. She also co-wrote four episodes of the show.

== Early life ==
Rocha was born on December 5, 1971, in Memphis, Tennessee and grew up in Rhode Island, graduating from Carnegie Mellon School of Drama in 1993.

== Career ==
Rocha's career began on stage in the August 1993 revival of the Jane Bowles play In the Summer House at the Vivian Beaumont Theater. Since then she has been in multiple Broadway and Off-Broadway productions including Noises Off and Nicky Silver's comedy The Altruists where she created the role of Cybil.

Her on-screen debut was in the 1996 cinematic adaptation of Arthur Miller's The Crucible, as Mercy Lewis. She stood out when she played the Atlantic American flight attendant who argued with Ben Stiller's character at the airport in the 2000 comedy Meet the Parents, a role she reprised in the sequel Meet the Fockers. She also had a recurring role on Buffy the Vampire Slayer as Anya's vengeance demon friend, Halfrek, and appeared as William the Bloody's love interest, Cecily. Rocha played Stonewall Jackson's wife, Anna in Ron Maxwell's Gods and Generals, an epic drama about the first two years of the American Civil War. Other films include The Object of My Affection, Autumn in New York, White Oleander, When Billie Beat Bobby, and Ready? OK!.

She has appeared on the Will & Grace episode "Strangers With Candice", as a straight woman who flirts with Will. In spring 2006, Rocha began acting in the short-lived NBC sitcom Teachers. She guest-starred in an episode of Law & Order: Special Victims Unit as Cindy Marino, an aggressive TV reporter. Also, she appeared on an episode of Bones as a victim's mother. Rocha has also played the character of a fourth-year resident surgeon, Dr. Sydney Heron, at Seattle Grace Hospital in the ABC TV series Grey's Anatomy.

In 2009, Rocha appeared with fellow Buffy the Vampire Slayer alum Emma Caulfield in the film TiMER. Rocha starred in the first and only season of Sherri starring Sherri Shepherd from The View which was loosely based on Shepherd's life. She played Summer, Sherri's boss and eventual friend. It aired on the Lifetime Network.

In 2016, Rocha was cast as Marcy Burns, a recurring character on the CBS sitcom Man with a Plan. In 2018, she was upgraded to a series regular for the third season.

== Personal life ==
In January 2008, Rocha announced that she was pregnant. She gave birth to her son Barlow Aix Krikorian on August 4, 2008, and her daughter Savria Dune Krikorian on January 25, 2011.

== Filmography ==
=== Film ===
Year	Title	Role	Notes
1996	The Crucible	Mercy Lewis	
1998	The Object of My Affection	Melissa Marx	
2000	Autumn in New York	Shannon	
2000	Meet the Parents	Flight Attendant	
2002	White Oleander	Susan Valeris	
2003	Gods and Generals	Anna Morrison Jackson	
2004	Stuck	Sasha	Short film
2004	Meet the Fockers	Flight Attendant	
2005	Confessions of an Action Star	Beth	
2005	Bam Bam and Celeste	Angela	
2005	Seagull	Kali	
2006	Falling for Grace	Carla	
2006	Ira & Abby	Tracy	
2007	Dead Write	Samantha	
2007	Ripple Effect	Alex	
2008	Over Her Dead Body	Angel	
2008	Ready? OK!	Hallie Hinton	
2008	John's Hand	Terry	Short film
2009	TiMER	Patty	
2009	Stolen	Coral	
2010	Video Night	Kali	Video short
2011	Mr. Stache	Narrator	Short film
2011	Serenity House	Marnie	Short film
2012	Brake	911 Operator	
2014	Space Station 76	Donna	
2014	The Loft	Mimi Landry	
2016	Lend a Hand for Love	Ernestine	Short film
2016	Gary Got Involved!	Neighbor	Short film

=== Television ===
Year	Title	Role	Notes
1997	Liberty! The American Revolution	Eliza Wilkinson	TV miniseries
1998	The Love Letter	Flossy Whitcomb	TV film
2001	When Billie Beat Bobby	Connie	TV film
2001	Cursed (aka The Weber Show)	Sophie	Episode: "...And Then Jack Had Two Dates"
2001	Becker	Kayla	Episode: "Psycho Therapy"
2002	Family Law	Kelly Gilbert	Episode: "Alienation of Affection"
2002	Hack	Joyce	Episode: "All Night Long"
2000–2002	Buffy the Vampire Slayer	Cecily Addams/Halfrek	7 episodes
2003	Crossing Jordan	Felix Tate	Episode: "Sunset Division"
2003	Will & Grace	Stephanie	Episode: "Strangers with Candice"
2005	Family Plan	Stacy	TV film
2005	Without a Trace	Liz Murray	Episode: "Party Girl"
2006	Teachers	Principal Emma Wiggins	All 6 episodes
2006	Standoff	Leanne Benson	Episode: "Partners in Crime"
2006	Bones	Jackie Swanson	Episode: "The Girl with the Curl"
2006–2007, 2024	Grey's Anatomy	Dr. Sydney Heron	9 episodes
2007	Law & Order: Special Victims Unit	Cindy Marino	Episode: "Haystack"
2007	Boston Legal	Allison Lovejoy	Episode: "Duck and Cover"
2007	The Call	Wendy 'The Wolf' Wolfram	TV film
2008	Notes from the Underbelly	Paige Bartlett	Episode: "Friends and Neighbors"
2009	Monk	Maria Scheter	Episode: "Mr. Monk Fights City Hall"
2009	Sherri	Summer Dickie	All 13 episodes
2010	$#*! My Dad Says	Roberta	Episode: "You Can't Handle the Truce"
2011	Drop Dead Diva	Dr. Audrey Foley	Episode: "You Bet Your Life"
2011	The Exes	Deanna	Episode: "An Inconvenient Tooth"
2012	Modern Family	Party Planner	Episode: "Leap Day"
2012	CSI: Crime Scene Investigation	Ms. Fowler	Episode: "Altered Stakes"
2012	Puppy Love	Gail	TV film
2012	Bits and Pieces	Jodi	TV film (Liv and Maddie original pilot)
2013–2017	Liv and Maddie	Karen Rooney	Main role
2016–2020	Man with a Plan	Marcy Burns	Recurring: seasons 1–2; Main: seasons 3–4
2019	Harvey Street Kids	Marie Curie	Guest voice
2023	Waco: The Aftermath	Ruth Riddle	Main role
2024	That Girl Lay Lay	Dr. Hirt	Episode: Toothaches and CHOFMA Breaks"
