= Andy Umberger =

American actor

Andy Umberger is an American actor who spent the early part of his career in New York City, where he was primarily a stage actor and appeared in three Broadway shows: City of Angels, Passion and Company. Since moving to Los Angeles in the late 90s, he has had supporting roles in over 15 films and has guest starred on over 60 television shows, with recurring roles on 10 different series, including: Mad Men, Weeds, Boston Legal, The West Wing, Desperate Housewives, ER, and as D'Hoffryn on Buffy the Vampire Slayer. He is one of only five actors to appear in three series created by Joss Whedon (Buffy the Vampire Slayer, Angel and Firefly).

In 2011, he was named one of the "Ten Best Actor Cameos" in the video game L.A. Noire. In 2013, he received the LA Weekly Theatre Award for Best Musical Ensemble as part of the cast of Silence! The Musical. In 2014, he played Roy Disney in When You Wish: The Story of Walt Disney for which he was nominated for Best Featured Actor in a Musical Ovation Award.

== Filmography ==
Year	Title	Role	Notes
2000	The X-Files	Agent Chesty Short	Episode: "Requiem"
2000	Bounce	Pilot	Uncredited
2001	On the Edge	Angry Father	
2002	Dragonfly	Doctor	
2003	The Singing Detective	Mr. Dark	
2003	Doctor Benny	Mr. Lewis	
2003	S.W.A.T.	Deputy Chief	
2004	First Daughter	Secret Service Supervisor	
2005	Coach Carter	Bay Hill Athletic Director	
2005	Nine Lives	Second Male Guard	
2006	Déjà Vu	NTSB Investigator	
2008	AmericanEast	American Safety producer	
2010	Unstoppable	Janeway	
2011	L.A. Noire	Carruthers	
2011	The Rum Diary	Mr. Green	
2013	Dark Skies	Doctor Jonathan Kooper	
2014	One Day: A Musical	YouTuber #10	
2016	The Accountant	Ed Chilton	
2019	Burning Kentucky	Abe	
