= Firefly (franchise) =

Space western media franchise by Joss Whedon

- Created by: Joss Whedon
- Owner: 20th Century Studios (Note: Except the 2005 film Serenity which is owned by Universal Pictures.)

Print publications
- Books: Big Damn Hero; The Magnificent Nine; The Ghost Machine; Generations; Life Signs; Carnival; What Makes Us Mighty; Coup de Grâce; Aim to Misbehave
- Comics: Those Left Behind; Better Days; The Other Half; Float Out; The Shepherd's Tale; Downtime; It's Never Easy; Leaves on the Wind

Films and television
- Film: Serenity (2005)
- Television series: Firefly (2002–2003)

Firefly is an American space Western media franchise created by Joss Whedon and produced by Mutant Enemy Productions. The franchise includes the TV series Firefly, the film Serenity, and other media.

== Plot synopsis ==
The franchise is set in the year 2517, after humanity's arrival in a new star system, and follows the adventures of the renegade crew of Serenity, a "Firefly-class" spaceship. Whedon described the Serenity crew members as "nine people looking into the blackness of space and seeing nine different things".

The franchise explores the lives of people who fought on the losing side of a civil war and now make a living as part of the pioneer culture that exists on the fringes of their star system. In addition, it is set in a future where the only two surviving superpowers, the United States and China, fused to form the central federal government, called the Alliance, resulting in the fusion of the two cultures as well. According to Whedon's vision, "nothing will change in the future: technology will advance, but we will still have the same political, moral, and ethical problems as today."

=== Characters ===
The franchise stars the crew of the ship Serenity: Captain Malcolm "Mal" Reynolds, second-in-command Zoe Washburne, pilot Hoban "Wash" Washburne, Companion Inara Serra, mercenary Jayne Cobb, mechanic Kaywinnet Lee "Kaylee" Frye, Doctor Simon Tam, prodigy River Tam and preacher Shepherd Book.

== Video media ==
=== Firefly ===
Firefly was initially broadcast on Fox from September 20 to December 20, 2002. One season of 14 episodes was produced. Fox canceled the show after 11 episodes were aired, and the remaining 3 episodes debuted in 2003 on the Sci Fi Channel in the United Kingdom. Despite its relatively short lifespan, the series received strong sales when it was released on DVD and had large fan support campaigns. It won an Emmy Award in 2003 for "Outstanding Special Visual Effects for a Series."

=== Serenity ===
The film Serenity was released on September 30, 2005. The film acts as a sequel to Firefly and features much of the same cast and crew. The film was written and directed by Joss Whedon. It was released on DVD, VHS and UMD on December 20, 2005, on HD DVD on April 18, 2006, and Blu-ray on December 30, 2008.

It received generally positive reviews and opened at number two, taking in $10.1 million its first weekend, spending two weeks in the top ten, and totaling a domestic box office gross of $25.5 million and a foreign box office gross of $13.3 million. However, it did not make back its budget until its release on DVD. Serenity won film of the year awards from Film 2005 and FilmFocus. It also won IGN Film's Best Sci-Fi, Best Story and Best Trailer awards and was runner up for the Overall Best Movie. It also won the Nebula Award for Best Script for 2005, the 7th annual 'User Tomato Awards' for best Sci-Fi movie of 2005 at Rotten Tomatoes, the 2006 viewers choice Spacey Award for favorite movie, the 2006 Hugo Award for Best Dramatic Presentation, Long Form and the 2006 Prometheus Special Award.

=== R. Tam Sessions ===
The R. Tam Sessions is a series of five short videos released online in promotion of the Serenity film. They were also released on the Serenity Blu-ray.

Set before the events of Firefly, the R. Tam Sessions depict excerpts of counseling sessions with the character River Tam while she is held at an Alliance "learning facility" known only as "The Academy." The counselor in these sessions is played by Joss Whedon himself, while Summer Glau appears as River. The videos shed some light on the experiments and torture "The Academy" conducted on River. They "document" her change from a shy prodigy to the mentally unstable character of the television series.

== Print media ==
=== Comics ===
Between 2005 and 2017, Dark Horse Comics released several Serenity comic books. For legal reasons, the comics were called Serenity rather than Firefly. All of the Serenity comics were one-shots or miniseries, as creator Joss Whedon didn't believe the Firefly universe could work as an ongoing format without compromising the quality of the franchise. The first Serenity comic was Those Left Behind, a three-issue miniseries. It was published July through September 2005, and served as a bridge between the TV series and the Serenity film, the latter of which released later in September 2005. Another three-issue miniseries named Serenity: Better Days was released in 2008, and tells of the Serenity crew becoming rich after a successful job. All of the Serenity miniseries and one-shots have been collected as hardcover graphic novels.

In July 2018, Boom! Studios announced that they had acquired the comic book and graphic novel publishing license to Firefly with plans to release new monthly comic book series, limited series, original graphic novels and more. As part of the acquisition, Boom! Studios also bought the republication rights to the old Serenity comics. The monthly series ran 36 issues from November 2018 to January 2022; Boom! continues to publish new stories as of 2024.

=== Novels ===
A novelization of the film Serenity, written by Keith R. A. DeCandido, was published by Pocket Books in 2005. At the time that book was contracted, Pocket Books also contracted to publish two original novels, and solicited proposals from various authors. However, none of these proposals were approved by Joss Whedon, and after a year had elapsed, the contract was canceled.

In February 2018, it was announced that Titan Books would be releasing three new Firefly novels, beginning later that year, with Joss Whedon attached as executive editor. The novels would be within the main canon of the Firefly universe, which also includes Dark Horse's Serenity comics. Big Damn Hero (James Lovegrove from a story concept by Nancy Holder) was released in November 2018, The Magnificent Nine (James Lovegrove) was released in March 2019, and The Ghost Machine (James Lovegrove) was released in March 2020. The series has been well-received, with the first four books winning or being shortlisted for major awards for tie-in fiction: Big Damn Hero was nominated for the 2019 Dragon Award for Best Media Tie-In Novel, The Magnificent Nine was nominated for the 2020 Scribe Award for Best Original Novel - Speculative, The Ghost Machine won the 2020 Dragon Award for Best Media Tie-In Novel and was nominated for the 2021 Scribe Award for Best Original Novel - Speculative and Generations won the 2021 Dragon Award for Best Media Tie-In Novel.

Six additional novels have since been released: Generations (Tim Lebbon) was originally scheduled for October 2019 but delayed to November 2020, Life Signs (James Lovegrove) in March 2021, Carnival (Una McCormack) in January 2022, What Makes Us Mighty (M. K. England) in July 2022, Coup de Grâce (Una McCormack) in July 2023, and Aim to Misbehave (Rosiee Thor) in November 2024. All available books have audiobook editions narrated by James Anderson Foster.

Title	Author	Publication	Place in the timeline	Summary
"Big Damn Hero"	Nancy Holder (story concept) and James Lovegrove	November 2018	Between "The Message" and "Heart of Gold"	The crew's latest job becomes complicated when Mal is captured by a group of former Browncoats who believe him to have betrayed the cause during the War.
"The Magnificent Nine"	James Lovegrove	March 2019	Between "Objects in Space" and "Those Left Behind"	Jayne receives a call for help from a former lover, but the visit is complicated by the presence of a child that all evidence suggests is Jayne's.
"The Ghost Machine"	James Lovegrove	March 2020	Between "Those Left Behind" and "Life Signs"	Mal and the crew take receipt of a sealed crate which they are being paid to transport to Badger, no questions asked.
"Generations"	Tim Lebbon	November 2020	Between "Objects in Space" and "Those Left Behind"	Mal wins an old map that River translates as revealing the apparent location of one of the generation ships that evacuated humanity from Earth centuries ago.
"Life Signs"	James Lovegrove	March 2021	Between "The Ghost Machine" and "Serenity"	The crew learn that Inara left Serenity because she is terminally ill, leading them to seek out a disgraced scientist rumoured to have a cure for her condition on a frozen Alliance prison planet.
"Carnival"	Una McCormack	January 2022	Before "Heart of Gold"	When a job on one of the Rim worlds goes wrong, Zoe and Book are taken hostage by some very unsatisfied customers, and Mal is given three days to find 8,000 platinum to get them back. The crew are now in a race against time to save their friends – calling on contacts and calling in favours, and some revealing talents that have hitherto remained hidden. Meanwhile, the hostages have their own plans...
"What Makes Us Mighty"	M. K. England	July 2022	Before "Heart of Gold"	
"Coup de Grâce"	Una McCormack	July 2023	Between "Objects in Space" and "Those Left Behind"	
"Aim to Misbehave"	Rosiee Thor	November 2024	Between "War Stories" and "Trash"	After being fleeced on payment for a job on a backwater moon, Mal, Book and the rest of the crew are forced to mount a madcap heist to untangle themselves from a sinister web of lies involving a strange figure from Book's History.

=== Short stories ===
The 2010 book Still Flying includes four short stories by writers of the TV show Firefly. The next short story, "Haven and Hell", was released in 2020 in the Barnes & Noble and Forbidden Planet exclusive hardcover editions of The Ghost Machine.

Title	Author	Year	Volume
"What Holds Us Down"	Jane Espenson	2010	Still Flying
"Fun With Dick and Jayne"	Ben Edlund	2010	Still Flying
"Crystal"	Brett Matthews	2010	Still Flying
"Take The Sky"	Jose Molina	2010	Still Flying
"Haven and Hell"	James Lovegrove	2020	The Ghost Machine (some editions only)

=== Reference books ===
The first book about Firefly was the 2004 essay collection Finding Serenity: Anti-heroes, Lost Shepherds and Space Hookers in Joss Whedon's Firefly. Though an unauthorised volume produced as part of the SmartPop Books series, it was edited by Firefly writer Jane Espenson. A sequel, Serenity Found: More Unauthorised Essays on Joss Whedon's Firefly Universe, followed in 2007 which also covered Serenity

Titan Books began publishing authorised Firefly and Serenity reference material with a series of visual companions containing shooting scripts, interviews with the cast and crew, images and behind-the-scenes information:

- Serenity: The Official Visual Companion (2005)
- Firefly: The Official Companion: Volume One (2006)
- Firefly: The Official Companion: Volume Two (2007)
- Firefly: Still Flying (2010)
- Firefly: A Celebration (2012) (an omnibus edition of the three Firefly titles produced for the series' tenth anniversary)

Titan resumed regular publication of Firefly reference and related books in 2016:

- Firefly: The Gorramn Shiniest Language Guide and Dictionary in the 'Verse (Monica Valentinelli, 2016)
- Firefly: Back from the Black (Joey Spiotto, 2017)
- The Serenity Handbook: The Official Crewmember's Guide to the Firefly-Class Series 3 Ship (Mark Sumerak, 2018)
- Firefly Encyclopedia (Monica Valentinelli, 2018)
- Firefly - The Big Damn Cookbook (Chelsea Monroe-Cassel, 2019)
- Firefly Artbook: A Visual Celebration of Joss Whedon's Swashbuckling 'verse (2020)

Another reference title, Mark Sumerak's Hidden Universe Travel Guides: Firefly: A Traveller's Companion to the 'verse was published by Insight Editions in 2018.

== Games ==
=== Board games ===
Gale Force Nine have released two games based on Firefly and a number of expansions for both. In Firefly: The Game, released in 2013, players take on the roles of Firefly captains, hire a crew and compete by completing jobs for their clients to fulfil their mission conditions. Subsequent expansions have introduced a variety of new elements, including new cards, game boards and ship miniatures:

- Artful Dodger Game Booster (2013)
- Breakin' Atmo (2013)
- Pirates & Bounty Hunters (2014)
- Blue Sun (2014)
- Esmerelda Ship Expansion (2015)
- Jetwash Ship Expansion (2015)
- Kalidasa (2015)
- Big Money Currency Upgrade Pack (2017)
- Cargo Hold Shiny Token Set (2017)
- Crime and Punishment Game Booster (2017)
- Firefly: the Game 10th Anniversary Edition (2024) includes Still Flying and 10th Anniversary Expansion which doubled the available Story Cards and added a Solo Mode with 9 Solo story cards.

The other Gale Force Nine game, Firefly: Adventures is a cooperative skirmish game where players work together as members of the Firefly crew to carry out jobs. In the original 2018 game, Brigands and Browncoats, the available characters are Mal, Zoe, Wash, Kaylee and Jayne. The other four main characters followed in two expansions, Wanted Fugitives adding River and Simon as playable characters while the Respectable Folk contains Book and Inara.

In 2015 Toy Vault released a cooperative board game, Fistful of Credits, with three scenarios inspired by the episodes "The Train Job", "Bushwhacked" and "Ariel".

=== Card games ===
In 2014 Toy Vault issued a cooperative card game, Out to the Black. This was followed in 2015 by Firefly: Tall Card, based on the card game played by Simon, Jayne and Book in "Shindig".

Looney Labs released a Firefly version of their card game Fluxx in 2016. Upgrade packs are also available. Upper Deck Company also released a Firefly version of their Legendary Encounters game in the same year. Quantum Mechanix have printed a Firefly-themed deck of standard playing cards.

In 2022 Gale Force Nine released Firefly: Misbehavin', a 2-4 players deck-building game.

=== Dice games ===
There have been two Firefly dice games, USAopoly's Firefly Yahtzee (notable for using a detailed miniature model of Serenity as the dice cup) and Upper Deck's Shiny Dice Game from 2015.

=== Role-playing games ===
The Serenity Role Playing Game was produced by Margaret Weis Productions and released in 2005. Its mechanics use the Cortex Classic System. In 2013 Margaret Weis Productions announced they had the rights to produce the Firefly Role-Playing Game using the Cortex Plus system: the game was released in 2014.

== Other media ==
On October 4, 2007, Alan Tudyk said that sales of the then newly released Serenity: Special Edition DVD had led to "talk [of] doing another movie". Joss Whedon has since discounted that statement as being "wishful thinking" and added "I want to do more, but nobody's talking about doing more right now."

=== Music ===
The soundtrack to Firefly was mostly composed by Greg Edmonson. The theme song of the series, "The Ballad of Serenity," was written by Joss Whedon and performed by Sonny Rhodes. The soundtrack to the series was released on CD on November 8, 2005, by Varèse Sarabande, although a 40-minute soundtrack was released by Fox Music in September 2005 as a digital EP. The soundtrack to the Serenity film was composed by David Newman and released on September 27, 2005.

=== Video game ===
On December 8, 2006, The Multiverse Network announced that it had obtained the rights from Twentieth Century Fox to develop a massively multiplayer online game (MMO) based on the series. As of 2008, little progress had been made. On September 3, 2008, as part of a press release announcing the development of an MMO based on the Buffy the Vampire Slayer television series, Multiverse stated that work on the Firefly MMO had been delayed as there were "some issues that need to be worked through", although some gaming news sites have expressed doubts, based on the lack of progress with the Firefly MMO, about whether or not it will be completed or released.

On January 2, 2012, website Ten Ton Hammer uncovered documentation that Multiverse, the team behind both the Buffy the Vampire Slayer and Firefly MMO projects, had ceased operation on both games as of December 7, 2011, due to lack of funding. However, on January 5, 2012, former members of the Multiverse team announced that they had acquired the source code and were still working to develop a finished product.

==== Firefly Online ====
On July 18, 2013, it was announced at Comic-Con that a mobile game titled "Firefly Online" would be released in Q3 2014 for Android and iOS. While it was later stated that the leads of the series had signed on to voice their characters in the game and the release was pushed back to Q2 2015, no release has ever materialized, and the game's website has not been updated since 2015.
