= Firefly (comics) =

Firefly, in comics, may refer to:

- Firefly (DC Comics), a number of Batman villains, including Garfield Lynns and Ted Carson, as well as Bridgit Pike in the Gotham TV series
- Firefly (Archie Comics), a Golden Age superhero from MLJ Comics, who has become a character in the Archie comic book universe and DC's Impact Comics imprint
- Firefly (G.I. Joe), a villain in the G.I. Joe universe who has appeared in a number of the comic books based on the franchise
- Firefly (franchise) comics:
  - Serenity (comics), published by Dark Horse Comics from 2005 to 2017 including:
    - Serenity: Those Left Behind, a 2005 miniseries
    - Serenity: Better Days, a 2008 miniseries
    - Serenity: Leaves on the Wind, a 2014 miniseries
  - Firefly (Boom! Studios comics), published by Boom! Studios from 2018 to present.
- Firefly, a Marvel Comics character who has gone up against Nova

== See also ==
- Firefly (disambiguation)
