= Deleted scene =

Scene that is removed from a film before release

A deleted scene is footage that has been removed from the final version of a film or television show. There are various reasons why these scenes are deleted, which include time constraints, relevance, quality or a dropped story thread, and can also be due to budgetary concerns. A similar occurrence is offscreen, in which the events are unseen.

A related term is extended scene, the longer version of a scene that was shortened for the final version of the film. Often, extended scenes are included in collections of deleted scenes or are referred to as deleted scenes themselves, as is the case with, for instance, Harry Potter and the Chamber of Secrets and Serenity.

== Reasons for removal ==
Scenes are often removed from films and television shows at the request of a studio or network, or to reduce running time, to improve narrative flow, or to avoid causing offense.

=== Requests for alteration ===
The studio or network planning to air or distribute it may be uncomfortable with a certain scene. They may ask for it be altered, removed, or replaced.

This is most common in the production of television series since networks and channels often must be mindful of how viewers, critics, or censors will react to programming. There may be a fear of losing ratings, being punished by fines or otherwise, or having trouble finding advertisers.

- The 2002 Fox series Firefly's original pilot episode ("Serenity", parts 1 and 2) had such a change made, with the original, less action-packed scene being replaced in the final cut of the episode but featuring on the later DVD box set release of the series, as one of several bonus features.
- A scene in the pilot of 24 involved the destruction of a Boeing 747. Aired just a few months after the 9/11 attacks, the producers made edits to cut out shots of the plane visibly exploding.

=== Running time ===
Concerns about running time may also cause scenes to be removed or shortened.

In feature films, scenes may be cut to reduce the length of the film's final cut, sometimes in order to include more screenings of a film each day when released theatrically.

In television serials, however, running time becomes an even greater concern because of the strict timeslot limitations, especially on channels supported by advertisements, and there may be only 20 minutes of the actual show per half-hour timeslot. Depending on the station and the particular format of the show, that may or may not include opening credits or closing credits; many ad-supported stations now "squish" the closing credits or force them into a split-screen to show more advertising. Most programs are in either a half-hour or a one-hour timeslot, forcing producers to break up the acts in a manner that they hope will make the viewer want to continue watching after the ad break and to avoid exceeding the stricter run time limits.

=== Disruption of narrative flow ===
Though the quality of the initial and the final cuts of a film is subjective, a scene or version of a scene in a film may have an adverse effect on the film as a whole. It may slow the film down, provide unnecessary details or exposition, or even explain points that should be implied or said more subtly. It is common to remove such scenes at the editing level, though they may be released on the home video release as a bonus feature.

There are at least a few examples, including a number of the deleted scenes on the DVD release of Firefly's sequel film Serenity (in fact, the audio commentary on the DVD's deleted scenes collection quite often mentions the plot or the tension being disrupted or slowed by including a scene or too much expositional as the main reason for the scene's removal from the final theatrical cut). Another well known example is the cocoon sequence in the film Alien. The scene added a lot of information about the fate of several crew members and new information on the life cycle of the creature, but it was ultimately deleted, as it was thought to slow down and disrupt the tension of the end of the film.

=== Dropped story threads ===
Sometimes, a director may decide to cut parts of the story, which would necessitate the cutting of corresponding parts of the film. For example, if a character dies in the final battle of a film, the director may choose to cut it so that the character's fate becomes ambiguous. In some cases, there would be reshoots that show the character surviving. In others, the character's participation in the final battle might be cut entirely. All of these would make it possible for the character to appear in a sequel. In such cases, the deleted scene would be explicitly non-canon.

== Formats ==
Deleted or extended scenes may be in any of several different formats. They may or may not feature finished special effects (especially in science fiction and fantasy films in which visual effects are more expensive), and the film quality may or may not be the same as in the rest of the film, but that may depend only on how much post-production editing was done.

Additionally, deleted scenes of animated films may not be in the form of a fully animated scene, but instead be included in the form of an animatic or blooper, as is the case with the deleted scenes on the DVD releases of Pixar's Toy Story and Finding Nemo.

== "Cutting room floor" ==
The figure of speech "cutting room floor" and its derivatives (such as "left on the cutting room floor") refers to the process where content is removed and abandoned. The phrase originates from the era when footage was captured on photographic film. Editors would physically cut the film to remove any unwanted frames before stitching the film together as a final piece in an editing or "cutting" room, occasionally removing entire scenes. Cut footage film was then pushed off the editing table and onto the floor below, and was swept up and discarded into a garbage can at the end of the working day. While the term is often applied in the context of filming, it is also used to refer to any piece ultimately left out of a final product or the process necessary to remove it.

== Parody ==
The DVD release for The Hitchhiker's Guide to the Galaxy feature film featured not only a handful of regular deleted scenes but also two spoof "Really Deleted" scenes.

YTV's ZAPX sometimes makes "deleted scenes" that are not genuine deleted scenes but rather random scenes of the movie with footage of the program's host, Simon, inserted into the clip, for that purpose.

On the DVD for UHF, "Weird Al" Yankovic provides commentary for the deleted scenes and emphasizes that there are hours of film footage but that they were all removed for good reasons.

== See also ==
- Blooper
- Director's cut
- Film editing
- Film censorship
- Offscreen
- Outtake
- Alternate ending
