= Whedonverse (comics) =

American comic book series

Publication information
- Publisher: Boom! Studios; 20th Century Studios
- Publication date: 2018 – 2024
- Main characters: Angel; Buffy the Vampire Slayer; Firefly

Creative team
- Created by: Joss Whedon

Whedonverse is a collection of American comic books published by Boom! Studios and based on television series created by Joss Whedon.

== List of titles ==
=== Ongoing series ===
Title	Issues	Premiere date	Finale date	Writer(s)	Artist(s)	Note	Ref.
Firefly	1–36	November 19, 2018	February 1, 2022	Greg Pak	Dan McDaid	—N/a	
Buffy the Vampire Slayer	1–34	January 24, 2019	January 26, 2022	Jordie Bellaire	Dan Mora	—N/a	
Angel (vol. 2)	0–16	May 1, 2019	December 18, 2019	Bryan Edward Hill	Gleb Melkinov	Renamed to Angel + Spike since Issue #9.	
Angel (vol. 3)	1–8	January 19, 2022	August 17, 2022	Christopher Cantwell	Daniel Bayliss	—N/a	
All New Firefly	1–10	February 23, 2022	November 16, 2022	David M. Booher	Jordi Perez	Sequel to Firefly.	—N/a
The Vampire Slayer	1–16	April 20, 2022	June 19, 2023	Sarah Gailey	Irene Flores	Sequel to Buffy the Vampire Slayer.	—N/a

=== Limited series ===
Title	Issues	Premiere date	Finale date	Writer(s)	Artist(s)	Notes	Ref.
Buffy the Vampire Slayer/Angel: Hellmouth	1–5	October 9, 2019	February 12, 2020	Jordie Bellaire; Jeremy Lambert	Eleonora Carlini	Crossover event between Buffy the Vampire Slayer and Angel (vol. 2).	
Buffy the Vampire Slayer: Willow	1–5	July 8, 2020	November 18, 2020	Mariko Tamaki; Jeremy Lambert	Natacha Bustos	Featuring Willow Rosenberg.	
Firefly: Brand New 'Verse	1–6	March 24, 2021	August 20, 2021	Josh Lee Gordon	Fabiana Mascolo	Set twenty years after the events of Firefly.	—N/a
Buffy the Last Vampire Slayer (vol. 1)	1–4, plus 1 special	December 9, 2021	March 9, 2022	Casey Gilly	Joe Jaro	Set thirty years after the events of Buffy the Vampire Slayer.	
Buffy the Last Vampire Slayer (vol. 2)	1–5	August 2, 2023	December 6, 2023	Casey Gilly	Oriol Roig	Sequel to Buffy the Last Vampire Slayer.	
Firefly: The Fall Guys	1–6	September 6, 2023	March 13, 2024	Sam Humphries	Jordi Pérez	—N/a	

=== One-shot issues ===
Title	Publication date	Writer(s)	Artist(s)	Note	Ref.
Firefly: Bad Company	March 27, 2019	Josh Lee Gordon	Francesco Mortarino; Giuseppe Cafaro; Moy R.	—N/a	
Buffy the Vampire Slayer/Firefly: Welcome to the Whedonverse	May 17, 2019	Various		Published during Free Comic Book Day 2019.	
Buffy the Vampire Slayer: Chosen Ones	August 28, 2019	Various		—N/a	
Firefly: The Outlaw Ma Reynolds	January 8, 2020	Greg Pak	Davide Gianfelice	—N/a	
Buffy the Vampire Slayer: Every Generation	June 3, 2020	Various		—N/a	
Firefly: Blue Sun Rising	September 30, 2020	Greg Pak	Dan McDaid	Crossover event with Firefly #21–24.	—N/a
Buffy the Vampire Slayer: Faith	February 24, 2021	Jordie Bellaire; Jeremy Lambert	Eleonora Carlini	Featuring Faith.	—N/a
Buffy the Vampire Slayer: Tea Time	June 30, 2021	Mirka Andolfo	Siya Oum	Featuring Rupert Giles.	—N/a
Firefly: River Run	September 29, 2021	David M. Booher	Andres Genolet	Featuring Simon Tam.	—N/a
Firefly Holiday Special	December 15, 2021	Jeff Jensen	Vincenzo Federici; Fabiana Mascolo; Jordi Perez	—N/a	—N/a
Buffy the Vampire Slayer 25th Anniversary Special	March 30, 2022	Various		—N/a	—N/a
Buffy '97	June 29, 2022	Jeremy Lambert	Marianna Ignazzi	—N/a	—N/a
Firefly: 20th Anniversary Special	August 31, 2022	Jorge Corona; Josh Lee Gordon	Fabiana Mascolo; Jordi Perez	—N/a	—N/a
Firefly: Keep Flying	November 9, 2022	Jeff Jensen	Nicola Izzo	—N/a	—N/a
All New Firefly: Big Danm Finale	December 23, 2022	David M. Booher	Simona di Gianfelice	—N/a	—N/a
Buffy the Vampire Slayer: The Lost Summer	May 3, 2023	Casey Gilly	Lauren Knight	—N/a	
Firefly: Malcolm Reynolds, Year One	September 4, 2024	Sam Humphries	Giovanni Fabiano	—N/a	—N/a

=== Graphic novels ===
Title	Publication date	Writer(s)	Artist(s)	Note	Ref.
Firefly: The Sting	November 30, 2019	Delilah S. Dawson	Various	—N/a	
Firefly: Watch How I Soar	December 1, 2020	Various		—N/a	—N/a

== See also ==
- List of Buffyverse comics
  - Buffy the Vampire Slayer comics
  - List of Angel comics
- Serenity (comics)
