= Serenity: Better Days =

Comic book miniseries

- Cover of the trade paperback collecting the series. Art by Jo Chen.

Publication information
- Publisher: Dark Horse Comics
- Schedule: Monthly
- Format: Limited series
- Publication date: March 2008 - May 2008
- No. of issues: 3
- Main characters: Malcolm Reynolds; Zoe Washburne; Hoban "Wash" Washburne; Jayne Cobb; Kaylee Frye; Simon Tam; River Tam; Derrial Book; Drone Builder; Ephraim Sanda

Creative team
- Written by: Joss Whedon; Brett Matthews
- Artist(s): Will Conrad; Adam Hughes

Serenity: Better Days is a 2008 three-issue comic book miniseries published by Dark Horse Comics, based on the 2002 science fiction television series Firefly, and the 2005 feature film into which it was adapted, Serenity.

It is the second comic book to be based on Firefly after the 2005 miniseries, Serenity: Those Left Behind. Like Those Left Behind, it is written by Firefly creator Joss Whedon and Brett Matthews, illustrated by Will Conrad, and is set in between the end of the TV series and the feature film. Unlike the previous series, Adam Hughes illustrated all the covers, each of which depicts three of the nine cast members, and when placed side by side, form a triptych. The first issue was published March 12, 2008. Each issue is 40 pages long.

A trade paperback volume collecting the entire series was published in October 2008.

== Plot ==
A demonstration of an armed tactical drone is held before a large group of people by its Builder. Meanwhile, Captain Malcolm Reynolds and his crew are engaging in a heist of ancient artworks. As they attempt to flee with the art, their truck is confronted by the drone, which chases them across the busy highways of an unnamed planet, exchanging weapons fire with Reynolds' crew. As this is happening, the chase and firefight is monitored by the Builder. The thieves narrowly manage to escape the drone, which they manage to deactivate and steal as well. Meanwhile, Companion and Serenity resident Inara Serra is engaged with a customer named Ephraim Sanda, an Alliance special ops squad leader, though in her mind, she fantasizes that he is Captain Reynolds. Sanda hunts "Dust Devils", radicals within the former ranks of the Independents, who became terrorists after the Independents surrendered at the end of the war.

Reynolds' crew show the drone to a potential buyer, who is disappointed that it is missing its logic core. The buyer does not have the money for the drone, but says he knows where a large amount can be located, and will direct Reynolds to it if they agree to send him a logic core afterwards. The money is underneath a large Buddha statue in a temple. The crew journeys to the temple, and takes the money. In counting it, Reynolds realizes that it is far more than they were told, and is dumbstruck with the realization that they are now rich.

The crew heads off to Pelorum, a luxurious resort planet, where they rent out a suite that costs 1,000 credits a night. Each crew member regales the others with their personal fantasies of how they wish their lives would change if they each had limitless wealth. Meanwhile, Sanda prepares his men to take down Reynolds. At the same time, the Builder tortures Reynolds' buyer for his role in trafficking the drone, pulling out all of his teeth, a practice run of what he intends to do to Reynolds. Because the drone was designed to expel microscopic tracking beacons in the event of unexpected shutdown or failure, he is able to track Reynolds and his crew to Pelorum. Reynolds and Zoe detect the arrival of Sanda's ship, who is also on Pelorum, and identify Sanda, who is en route to Inara's shuttle. Reynolds journeys to the shuttle, and is surprised to see Dr. Simon Tam emerge from it. He is then knocked unconscious by Sanda, who ties him up and beats him, thinking him a Dust Devil.

Zoe later investigates Inara's shuttle, and notices the signs of the struggle nearby that alerts her to what has happened to Reynolds. She informs the rest of the crew that the Dust Devil that Sanda is looking for is her, as she was one of the soldiers who kept on fighting after the end of the war, thinking themselves "peacemakers". She broadcasts an open message for Sanda to hear, informing him of the location at which she will surrender to him, hoping to lure him into an ambush. Just after Sanda arrives with Malcolm and some men, Sanda's ship is blown up by the Builder, who has appeared to exact revenge on Reynolds. Reynolds' crew and Sanda's fight off the Builder together. After the Builder is defeated, Sanda allows Reynolds and his crew to depart, but Reynolds then learns that Sanda's men stole the money from Serenity. Later, Inara observes that Reynolds is neither surprised nor concerned about the loss of the money, and suggests that unlike the others, Reynolds is already living out the life he wants, and that it would be threatened if the rest of his crew suddenly became rich enough to go off in their own directions. Reynolds responds that he simply accepts where he is in life, preferring not to dwell in fantasy.

== Publication dates ==
- Issue #1: March 12, 2008
- Issue #2: April 9, 2008
- Issue #3: May 14, 2008
- Trade paperback: October 13, 2008 (ISBN 978-1-59582-162-1)

== Awards ==
The trade paperback won Diamond's 2008 Gem Award for "Licensed Trade Paperback of the Year".

Serenity: Better Days was nominated for the first Hugo Award for Best Graphic Story.

== See also ==
- List of comics based on television programs
- List of comics based on films
