= Finding Serenity =

Compilation of essays dealing with the television series Firefly

Finding Serenity: Anti-heroes, Lost Shepherds and Space Hookers in Joss Whedon's Firefly
- First edition
- Author: Jane Espenson
- Cover artist: Todd Michael Bushman
- Language: English
- Genre: Television/Science Fiction
- Publisher: BenBella Books
- Publication date: 2005
- Publication place: United States
- Media type: Print Paperback
- Pages: 238 pp
- ISBN: 1-932100-43-1
- OCLC: 57493843

Finding Serenity: Anti-heroes, Lost Shepherds and Space Hookers in Joss Whedon's Firefly is a set of 22 essays compiled by Jane Espenson. The book was released in April 2005 following the cancellation of the television show Firefly. Jane Espenson was a writer for the show and the book contains a series of essays that discuss the show from a variety of viewpoints, some scholarly, others with a comedic note. Most of the essays analyze what did and did not work in the show.

The compilation includes insight into the filming of each episode with actress Jewel Staite (who played the role of Kaylee Frye on the show) providing a commentary on each of the episodes produced, which was praised by multiple reviewers. Some essays speculate on the resolution of to resolve the unanswered questions brought up in the show, for example the origin of the Reavers, although that specifically was eventually answered by Serenity. One essays is existentialist. Others focus on feminist interpretations and gender roles, and some are easier to understand with prior knowledge of feminist interpretations of Buffy and Angel; one reviewer compared the level of analysis to what one might expect in a college class reading the book. However, prior understanding of academic criticism is not needed to understand the essays.

One reviewer lamented the lack of more serious political commentary in the book, while another described two of the essays as "more politically grounded than the others." A third praised the analysis and personal commentary from Staite while criticizing the pervasive comparisons between Firefly and Buffy throughout the work.

It was followed by Serenity Found: More Unauthorized Essays on Joss Whedon's Firefly Universe in September 2007 by the same editor, including contributions by actor Nathan Fillion (Malcolm Reynolds in the series) and science-fiction author Orson Scott Card.
