= Serenity (Firefly episode) =

- Firefly episode
- Introduction of Wash that gives a glimpse into his whimsical personality
- Episode no.: Season 1 Episode 1 (originally aired as episode 14)
- Directed by: Joss Whedon
- Written by: Joss Whedon
- Production code: 1AGE79
- Original air date: December 20, 2002
- Running time: 86 minutes

Guest appearances
- Carlos Jacott as Lawrence Dobson; Mark Sheppard as Badger; Andy Umberger as the captain of the Dortmunder; Philip Sternberg as Inara's client; Eddie Adams as Bendis; Colin Patrick Lynch as Radio Operator; Bonnie Bartlett as Patience

Episode chronology
← Previous —	Next → "The Train Job"

"Serenity" is the original intended pilot for the American science fiction television series Firefly created by Joss Whedon. It was the first episode produced for the series and premiered as the show's series finale on Friday, December 20, 2002 on Fox. With studio executives unsatisfied with the episode for the series premiere, the show's second episode, "The Train Job", was re-written and produced as a second pilot to be aired first. The episode shares its name with the 2005 feature film Serenity, which serves as a continuation to Firefly.

In the early 26th Century, Malcolm Reynolds (Nathan Fillion) and Zoe Washburne (Gina Torres) are survivors of their rebel unit in the Battle of Serenity Valley during the Unification War, in which their side lost. Six years later, they are eking out an existence on the edges of space in their Firefly-class spaceship Serenity, taking odd jobs even if they involve petty crime. They also take on passengers to supplement their income, including a man with a secret that will change the path of their lives forever.

In 2003, the episode won the award for "Best Visual Effects in a Television Series" from Visual Effects Society, and was nominated for a Hugo Award in 2003 for "Best Dramatic Presentation, Short Form".

== Plot ==
=== Part 1 ===
In 2511, a squad of "Independents", led by Sergeant Malcolm "Mal" Reynolds and Corporal Zoe Alleyne, fight in the Battle of Serenity Valley during the Unification War. Despite Mal's insistence that the battle can be won with air support, Zoe receives orders to surrender from the leaders of the rebellion. Mal is forced to watch in horror as Alliance ships sweep the battlefield unopposed, destroying the rest of the Independents.

Six years later, Mal is the captain of his own transport ship, an older-model Firefly-class vessel he named Serenity, with Zoe as his second-in-command. The rest of the ship's crew consists of Wash (Alan Tudyk), who is the pilot and Zoe's husband; Kaylee (Jewel Staite), the engineer; and Jayne Cobb (Adam Baldwin), an untrustworthy gun-for-hire. Inara (Morena Baccarin), a "Companion" (a very high-class courtesan) who rents one of Serenity's two shuttles, normally travels with them, but she is currently away on business.

While the crew are illegally salvaging some crates off a derelict Alliance spaceship, they are spotted by an Alliance cruiser. To escape capture, Mal has Wash deploy a fake distress beacon. The Alliance cruiser falls for the deception, but broadcasts a bulletin that a Firefly-class ship is carrying stolen Alliance goods.

The crew of Serenity travel to Persephone to deliver the stolen goods to Badger (Mark Sheppard), the small-time crime lord who hired them for the heist. However, Badger reneges on their deal after learning that the Alliance has put a bulletin on Mal's crew. He also does not like the way Mal looks down on him. Mal decides to try selling the cargo to Patience, an old business associate who lives on Whitefall. Zoe has misgivings, since Patience shot Mal the last time they met, but Mal is desperate to get rid of the hot cargo. The crew picks up passengers before leaving Persephone for extra income, and Inara rejoins the ship. The new passengers are a preacher named Shepherd Book (Ron Glass), a bumbling man named Dobson (Carlos Jacott), and a wealthy doctor named Simon Tam (Sean Maher) who brings aboard a mysterious large crate.

En route to Whitefall, Wash discovers that someone on board sent a message hailing the nearest Alliance cruiser. Suspecting that Simon is the mole, Mal confronts him, only to discover that Dobson is actually an undercover Alliance lawman. Dobson surprises Mal by telling them it's Simon he wants to arrest, not Mal. During the tense confrontation, a nervous Dobson accidentally shoots Kaylee in the stomach before being overpowered by Book, who manages to easily disarm and subdue him. When an Alliance cruiser orders them to dock for prisoner transfer, Simon threatens not to treat Kaylee if they do not flee. Mal reluctantly agrees (after being prodded by Inara to do so), but then has Jayne restrain Simon while he opens Simon's mysterious crate, only to be surprised to find a naked young woman inside in cryonic sleep.

=== Part 2 ===
The woman in the crate is River Tam (Summer Glau), Simon's younger sister. Simon explains that his sister was a brilliant child prodigy who was sent to an elite, but secretive Alliance academy when she was fourteen. After River sent him an encoded letter for help, he discovered that the Alliance was experimenting on the academy students. Simon abandoned his career as a successful trauma surgeon to rescue her and spent all of his money to get her smuggled out of the academy. The Alliance wants River back very badly. Mal decides to proceed to Whitefall as planned and drop off both the goods and the Tam siblings.

Mal tells Jayne to interrogate Dobson to find out what he told the Alliance about them. Once Jayne finds out that the Alliance knows nothing, Dobson tries to bribe him, offering him enough money to buy his own ship.

Soon after, they discover that a Reaver ship is approaching. Zoe explains to Simon that "If they take the ship, they'll rape us to death, eat our flesh and sew our skins into their clothing. And if we're very very lucky, they'll do it in that order." Luckily, the Reaver ship passes by without incident.

Serenity lands on Whitefall. Not trusting Patience, Mal sends Jayne to take out her hidden sniper while he and Zoe meet Patience and some of her henchmen in a barren valley. Mal gives Patience a sample of the cargo ("Genuine A grade foodstuffs... protein, vitamins... immunization supplements" that looks like a chocolate). As expected, Patience tries to kill them after learning where they have buried the rest, but Mal, Zoe and Jayne gun down Patience's men. Mal leaves Patience alive, but takes the money he was promised. Jayne is warned by Wash that the Reavers turned around and followed them to Whitefall.

Meanwhile, back on the ship Dobson escapes, knocking out Book and grabbing River. Mal returns and calmly shoots Dobson in the head, dumping his body off the ship as they start to lift off, the Reavers hot on their tail.

Mal orders Inara, Book, Simon and River to go to Inara's shuttle, just in case the ship is boarded. Jayne carries the still-convalescing Kaylee to the engine room, and Book offers to help her. With Jayne and Book carrying out Kaylee's instructions, Wash is able to pull off a "Crazy Ivan" (VIFF), and Serenity manages to shake the pursuing Reavers.

Jayne tells Mal that they should dump the siblings since Dobson had told him that the Alliance will keep coming after River. Mal asks Jayne why he did not turn against him. Jayne responds that the money Dobson offered was not enough. Mal suggests to Simon that he and River might be safer on the move, and points out that Serenity is always moving, and in need of a qualified ship's medic. Simon reluctantly accepts his offer.

== Deleted scenes ==
This episode has two deleted scenes.

- An alternate opening scene showing the aftermath of the Battle of Serenity Valley. Most of the Independent soldiers are dead. Mal and the survivors witness the long-awaited arrival of the medships; when Zoe says "Thank God" for the ships' arrival, Mal bitterly asks whose side God is on. This scene was deleted because the studio wanted a more action-packed opening scene. This scene would have explained why Mal, who is seen kissing a cross on his neck during the battle, lost his faith in God.
- A scene where Simon is taking care of the wounded Kaylee. Book asks why Simon chose to come aboard Serenity and Simon replies that it seemed disreputable. Book suggests that Simon lacks a knowledge of history. Simon researches the Battle of Serenity Valley on his encyclopedia and Zoe tells him about how many soldiers died during the battle and its aftermath. She tells Simon that Mal will not kill him unless he's got no other option. When Simon asks why Mal named the ship after such a horrible battle, Zoe replies that "once you've been in Serenity, you never leave."

== Arc significance ==
This episode introduces a major story arc of the short-lived series: that of River and Simon. It reveals Simon's deep, selfless love for his sister and that his life is now defined by her.

Despite the script stating that Dobson is killed by Mal, Joss Whedon had planned to bring the character back. Although the series was cancelled, Dobson coming back for revenge was a key part of the plot in Serenity: Those Left Behind, a three-issue comic book miniseries intended to bridge the television series and the movie Serenity.

== Themes ==
As Joss Whedon points out in the commentary for this episode, every show he does is "about creating family". To achieve the sense of family, he centers some action around a dinner scene at a table, and directs warm light into the faces of the characters. Strengthening this theme is the interaction between Simon and his sister River. Simon has done a selfless act in rescuing his sister, and his life is now defined by it. Whedon wanted to show a relationship like that was not a parent-child relationship.

Another theme is the fusion of Asian and frontier culture. As Brett Matthews said, you couldn't ask for a better mission statement for the show than the shot of Mal with a Western tin cup and chopsticks. He then contrasts this to the tall, vertical Alliance cruiser that detects them, as he wanted to show how inefficient the Alliance government was.

He also wanted to show a lifestyle that was very tactile and physical, and contrast it to the lifestyle of the contemporary audience where things "fall in your lap."

== Production ==
Production on the pilot episode began on March 20, 2002. The episode's beginning sequence was reshot before it aired, to provide more of the "action" that Fox wanted. The pilot reportedly cost more than $8 million.

Rebecca Gayheart initially played the role of Inara Serra, but was replaced by Baccarin early in the episode's filming. In anticipation of the role being recast, Whedon shot scenes of the character interacting with the crew in singles, so the only portions that would have to be reshot would be the shots of Inara.

After the Reavers are introduced, the screen goes to near black to end the act. Whedon wanted to give the audience time to "breathe" before the beginning of commercials, but a true black would automatically cue the ads, so he went with a color that was as close to black as possible without causing this.

== Guest cast ==
- Carlos Jacott as Lawrence Dobson, an Alliance "Fed." This is also one of Whedon's "hat tricks" for the episode: an actor that has appeared on Buffy the Vampire Slayer and Angel, as well as Firefly.
- Mark Sheppard as Badger, the crime boss located on Persephone.
- Andy Umberger as the captain of the Alliance cruiser Dortmunder. He is also a "hat trick." In Buffy, though, he wore the heavy makeup of an important recurring character, the demon D'Hoffryn, Anyanka's boss, so he's barely recognizable, as Fillion notes in the DVD commentary.
- Philip Sternberg as Inara's client.
- Eddie Adams as Bendis, one of the members of Mal and Zoe's unit in the Battle of Serenity Valley.
- Colin Patrick Lynch as Radio Operator.
- Bonnie Bartlett as Patience.
