= Templin Highway =

Templin Highway is the completed part of a two-lane road project in Los Angeles County, California. The road connects Interstate 5 and the old Golden State Highway with the north end of Castaic Lake. The name is commonly misapplied to the old Golden State Highway, which runs north into Piru Gorge.

== Proposal ==
Originally named Warm Springs Road, it was renamed in 1967 after county highway commissioner Newton H. Templin, who had promoted the road's construction. Until plans were canceled in 1980, the road was to continue east; a 1958 plan shows it extending to San Francisquito Canyon Road as an expressway, and by 1975 it was to connect with Spunky Canyon Road near the Bouquet Reservoir.

== Use in media ==
For the filming of "Mr. Monk Gets Stuck in Traffic", an episode of the TV series Monk, the crew turned Templin Highway into a freeway by constructing a median barrier out of cinder blocks.

The highway also appears in the movie Serenity (2005) as the setting for the skiff chase scene.

The highway also appears in Fast & Furious (2009) as the setting for the opening scene, and then again in Furious 7 (2015) as the setting for the final scene.
