= Fight for Tomorrow =

- Textless cover for issue #5, art by Jo Chen.

Publication information
- Publisher: Vertigo
- Schedule: Monthly
- Format: Limited series
- Genre: Martial arts
- Publication date: November 2002 – April 2003
- No. of issues: 6
- Main character(s): Cedric Zhang; Christy

Creative team
- Created by: Brian Wood; Denys Cowan
- Written by: Brian Wood
- Penciller: Denys Cowan
- Inker: Kent Williams
- Letterer: John Costanza
- Colorist: Lee Loughridge
- Editor: Heidi MacDonald

Collected editions
- Fight for Tomorrow: ISBN 978-1401215620

Fight for Tomorrow is an American comic book six-issue limited series by writer Brian Wood (best known for DMZ) and artist Denys Cowan, published from 2002 to 2003 by Vertigo. A trade paperback collecting the six issues was released in January 2008. The last issue featured the Vertigo X sub-imprint logo, in commemoration of Vertigo's tenth anniversary.

The story is not inserted into any ongoing DC continuity that it could draw connections from. It is however set in the modern day with more grounded elements to portray a movie in a comic medium.

The single issues were released digitally on ComiXology from February through April 2017. The magazine it was published in was also fully colored. This miniseries manages to blend the highlights of stories involving Hong Kong action in a Fight Club atmosphere.

== Publication history ==
The limited series of six issues was published monthly by DC Comics under its Vertigo imprint. Alongside Brian Wood and Denys Cowan inks were done by Kent Williams, colors by Lee Loughridge, and lettering by John Costanza. Heidi MacDonald was the editor overseeing the work of the creative team. Further down the line, the six issues were reprinted in a trade paperback release

The production also utilized a larger creative team that included inking, coloring, lettering and editing. The six-issue format allowed the story to be spread out over several installments before it was collected into one edition. The project is one of the earliest examples of Wood’s published comic-book work for Vertigo.

== Plot summary ==
Kidnapped as a boy, Cedric Zhang – raised to fight in competitions – formed a bond with Christy, a young nurse. When she disappears with no explanation, Cedric immerses himself in the violent NYC underworld in an effort to locate her, finding himself back in the horrible world he spent his life trying to escape. His shift into a kung fu street brawler is a stark contrast from his humble beginnings as a buddhist monk.

The story follows Cedric Zhang as he attempts to forge a new life and come to terms with the consequences of his violent past. His search for Christy slowly leads him to several communities in New York City, including a Buddhist temple that provides an alternative to the city's criminal environment. Cedric’s relationships with Master Sahn, Big Sister and Little Brother introduce him to people who are dealing with their own struggles with family, responsibility and criminal associations. These interactions broaden the story to go beyond underground fighting, as Cedric tries to find a sense of belonging and develop meaningful relationships while running from his troubled past.

== Temple of love ==
Throughout the story, Cedric becomes attached to a buddhist temple run by Master Sahn, a kind nun who is involved in local community services. Big Sister, a young Asian-American woman, helps keep the temple running while raising her younger brother, Little Brother, a teenager who has trouble with school, associates himself closely with youths from the triads. The siblings have a close relationship and are known by these titles in the story. Big Sister is a kind and charitable Buddhist who patiently looks after her brother who she considers to be her only family, though she has her own secrets revealed later in the series.

== Powers and abilities ==
Cedric is a Muay Thai fighter. He had Muay Thai training and conditioning from a young age. He has strength, athleticism, and advanced fighting skills, allowing him to take down multiple trained opponents. His skills include delivering kicks that can shatter solid objects. He was wounded many times in his life and posses first aid and bandaging skills. Veteran onlookers of New York's underground fighting scene acknowledge his formidable blend of power and technique, demonstrating his prowess.

== Characters and setting ==
The series is set primarily in New York City and centers on characters involved with the city's underground fighting scene. The main character is Cedric Zhang, and his past as a fighter shapes his relationships and attempts to forge a different kind of life. In the story, Cedric develops a close relationship with a young nurse, Christy, who becomes the catalyst for his search.

Other important characters include Master Sahn, a Buddhist nun who runs a local temple, and two siblings called Big Sister and Little Brother. The temple is a contrast to the criminal environment surrounding Cedric and provides a community in which characters find support and personal connections. Big Sister takes care of her little brother and runs the temple, even as his ties to other young people create connections between the temple community and the New York criminal underworld.

== Collected edition ==
Title	Material collected	Format	Publication date	Price	ISBN
Fight for Tomorrow	Fight for Tomorrow #1–6	Trade paperback	January 16, 2008	$14.99 USD, $17.99 CAD	978-1401215620

== Reception ==
Chad Nevett of Comic Book Resources stated "a very solid read, but a lesser Brian Wood work. There's a reason that it doesn't jump out at many when discussing his body of work".

He also reported the series being very palpable in the sense that a love interest would be attracted by a main antagonist in the main character's perspective.
