= Jo Chen =

American comic book artist and writer

Jo Chen 咎井淳
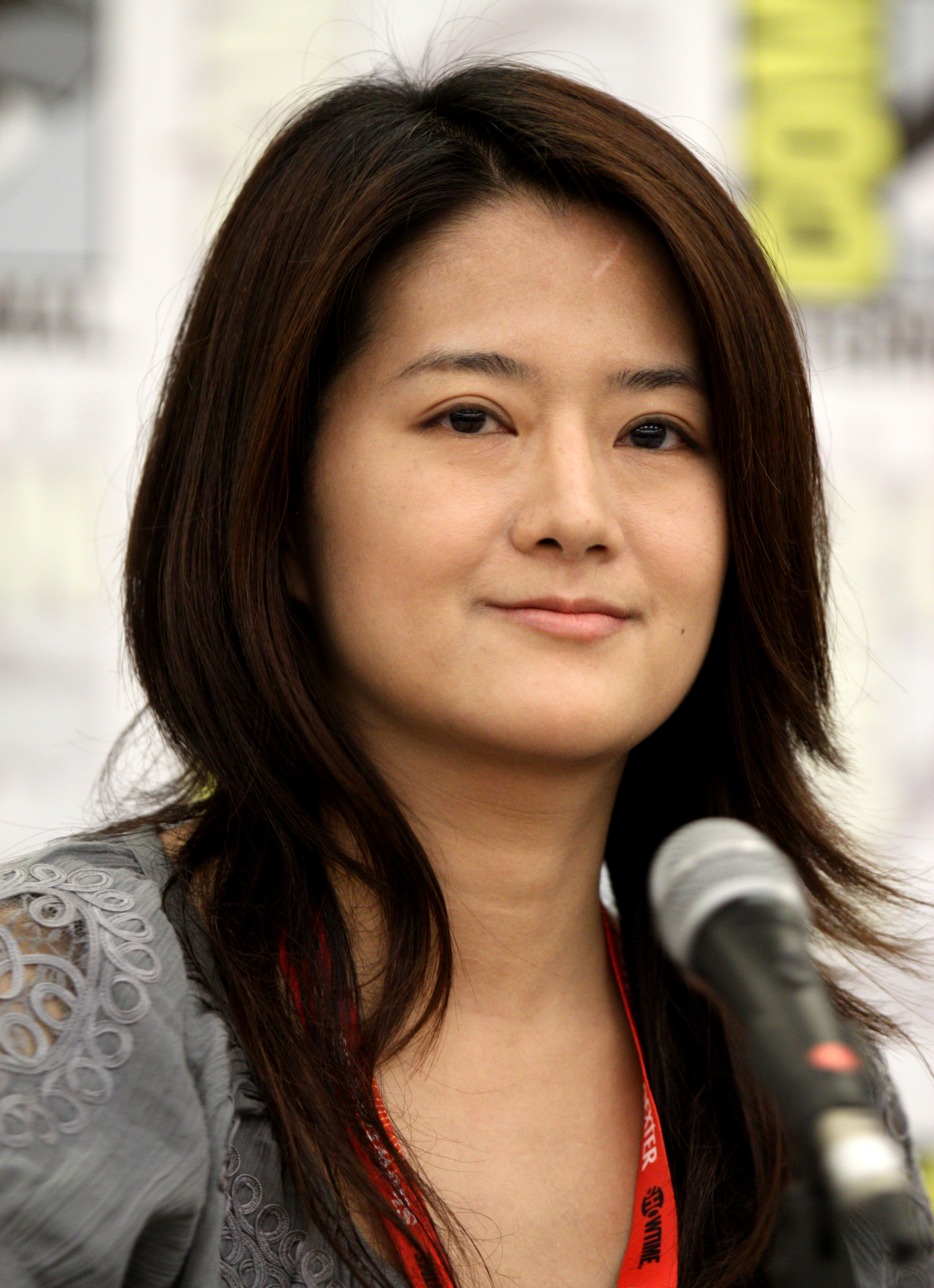
- Jo Chen at the 2011 Comic Con
- Born: July 4, 1976 (age 50) Taipei, Taiwan
- Areas: Writer, Penciller, Artist
- Pseudonyms: TogaQ, Jun Togai
- Notable works: Buffy the Vampire Slayer Season Eight; Runaways; The Other Side of the Mirror

Jo Chen (Chinese: 咎井淳; pinyin: Jiù Jǐngchún; born July 4, 1976) is an American comic book artist and writer best known for her highly detailed painted comic book covers. In the Japanese comic industry she is also known by the pen name TogaQ and is known as Jun Togai ("Togai Jun" 咎井淳).

== Early life ==
Chen was born in Taipei, Taiwan, and emigrated to the United States in late 1994.

== Career ==
Working professionally in the Asian comic book industry since age fourteen, she began her career in the U.S. comic book industry with her art work for the Racer X mini-series, part of the Speed Racer series published by Wildstorm/DC Comics in 2000.

She established herself producing interiors and covers for titles including Darkminds: Macropolis, Battle of the Planets, Robotech, Fight For Tomorrow, Taskmaster, The Demon, Thor, and (Batman &) Robin. Currently she is most well known to American comic readers as the cover artist of Runaways, and Joss Whedon's Buffy the Vampire Slayer Season 8 and Buffy the Vampire Slayer Season Nine comics published by Dark Horse Comics. She will also participate on the Whedon-Dark Horse Angel book.

In other media, Chen has also produced packaging artwork for Microsoft's popular Xbox Fable, Fable: The Lost Chapters, Fable II and Fable III RPGs, and done covers for PlayStation Magazine (a Final Fantasy cover for the January 2002 issue and a Tomb Raider cover for the February 2003 issue).

Under the pseudonym TogaQ, she and author Kichiku Neko (aka, Narcissus) created the yaoi doujinshi-turned manga series, In These Words. The title was eventually picked up by Japanese publisher, Libre Publishing and serialized in the yaoi comic anthology, Be x Boy Gold.

She is the younger sister of artist Christina Chen, and lives with her family outside of Washington, D.C.

== Bibliography ==
=== Interior work ===
- Racer X #1-3 (DC/Wildstorm, 2000). 3-issue miniseries.
- Darkminds: Macropolis #1-4 (Dreamwave, 2002). By Jo Chen and Christina Chen.
- Robotech: Love and War (DC/Wildstorm, 2003). Jo Chen drew "Little White Dragon", a back-up story included in every issue of the miniseries. Also drew a cover for the back-up story of #6.
- Battle of the Planets / Witchblade (Top Cow). Jo Chen assists her sister Christina Chen in the pencils of this one-shot crossover. Talking about the series in The Pulse in 2002, she said "Christina is the lead artist and I am only assisting with some minor peripheral characters that pop up in a panel crowd scene."
- The Other Side of the Mirror volumes 1 & 2 (TokyoPop (English version), JPOP (Italian version), 2007–2008)
- Speed Racer & Racer X: The Origins Collection trade paperback collection of DC/Wildstorm series (IDW Publishing, 2008)
- Buffy the Vampire Slayer Season Eight: Always Darkest (Dark Horse Presents, Dark Horse 2009)
- In These Words volumes 1 and 2 (Digital Media: 801 Media (English version), Libre Publishing (Japanese version), TokyoPop (German version), Taifu Comics (French version), ImageFrame (Korean version), Guilt Pleasure (Chinese version), HongSamut (Thai version) by Jo Chen (TogaQ) and Kichiku Neko.
- Cruel to be Kind Guilt Pleasure (Chinese and English versions) by Jo Chen (TogaQ) and Kichiku Neko 2010.
- Father Figure Guilt Pleasure (Chinese and English versions), Libre Publishing (Japanese version), ImageFrame (Korean version) by Jo Chen (TogaQ) and Kichiku Neko 2010 - 2014.
- Maybe Someday Guilt Pleasure (Chinese and English versions), Libre Publishing (Japanese version), ImageFrame (Korean version) by Jo Chen (TogaQ) and Kichiku Neko 2015.

=== Cover work ===
- Speed Racer Presents: Racer X: #1 (DC/Wildstorm, 2000).
- Darkminds Macropolis: #1-#5 (Image and Dreamwave Productions, 2001-2003).
- Warlands: The Age of Ice: #2 (Dreamwave Productions, 2001).
- Battle of the Planets: Battle Book: #1 (Top Cow, 2002).
- Darkminds Macropolis: trade paperback (Dreamwave Productions, 2003).
- The Demon: Driven out #1 (DC Comics, 2003). The cover of the #2 of this miniseries was drawn by her sister, Christina Chen.
- Fight for Tomorrow #5 (DC/Vertigo)
- Robin #115-117,119-120 (DC Comics)
- The Taskmaster #2 of mini-series (Marvel, 2002).
- Runaways Vol. 1 #1-6, 8-10, 13-18 (Marvel, 2003–2004) & Runaways Vol.2 #1-6, 9-10 & 19-30 (Marvel, 2005–2008).
- World Mythology: An Anthology of the Great Myths and Epics (third edition) (NTC Publishing Group, 2004)
- Thor: Son of Asgard #7-12 (Marvel, 2004–2005)
- Street Fighter. Jo Chen has done several covers for the "power foil" variant covers of the Street Fighter comic-book series produced by the UDON studios. Some of these covers were also used in some Street Fighter merchandising (at least in prints and control pads).
- Serenity: Those Left Behind #2 - Kaylee (Dark Horse, 2005).
- Eva: Daughter of the Dragon (Dynamite Entertainment, 2007).
- Buffy the Vampire Slayer Season Eight #1-10, 16-30 (Dark Horse, 2006-2010).
- Serenity: Better Days trade paperback edition (Dark Horse, 2008).
- Rex Mundi (Dark Horse Comics) #16 (Dark Horse, 2009).
- Incarnate #1-3 (Radical Publishing, 2009-2010).
- Darkstalkers Tribute hard and trade paperback covers (UDON Entertainment, 2009).
- Star Wars: Invasion #1-6 (Dark Horse, 2009-2010).
- Roaming Cadenza (A Bard's Folktale) Kindle edition (Aramis Barron, 2010).
- Serenity: Float Out one-shot (Dark Horse, 2010).
- Serenity: Better Days hard cover edition (Dark Horse, 2011).
- From the Pages of Hellboy: B.P.R.D. The Dead Remembered #1-4 (Dark Horse, 2011).
- Samurai's Blood #1-6 (Benaroya Publishing - Image, 2011).
- Kull: The Cat and the Skull #1-4 (Dark Horse, 2011).
- Buffy the Vampire Slayer Season Nine #1 (Dark Horse, 2011).
- Angel and Faith #1 (Dark Horse, 2011).
- Superman: Grounded Vol 1 #707 (DC Comics, 2011).
- Buffy the Vampire Slayer Season Nine Volume 1: Freefall TPB (Dark Horse, 2012).
- Buffy the Vampire Slayer Season Nine Volume 2: On Your Own TPB (Dark Horse, 2012).
- Buffy the Vampire Slayer Season Nine Volume 3: Guarded TPB (Dark Horse, 2013).
- Buffy the Vampire Slayer Season Nine Volume 4: Welcome to the Team TPB (Dark Horse, 2013).
- Buffy the Vampire Slayer Season Nine: Spike—A Dark Place TPB (Dark Horse, 2013).
- Buffy the Vampire Slayer Season Nine Volume 5: The Core TPB (Dark Horse, 2014).
