= Serenity (soundtrack) =

Film score by David Newman
- Released: September 27, 2005
- Recorded: Newman Scoring Stage, 2004-2005
- Genre: Classical, country
- Length: 49:53
- Label: Varèse Sarabande
- Producer: David Newman, Joss Whedon, Barry Mendel

Professional ratings
Review scores
| Source | Rating |
|---|---|
| Allmusic | 3.5/5 stars |
| Filmtracks.com | 2/5 stars |
| SoundtrackNet | 3.5/5 stars |

The soundtrack to the 2005 motion picture Serenity was released on September 27, 2005. The film's score was composed by David Newman, and performed by the Hollywood Studio Symphony under Newman's direction. According to director Joss Whedon's sleeve notes for the album, Newman was recommended by Universal's music executives when he requested a musician capable of "everything." It is of note that the acoustic guitar version of the Ballad of Serenity, which was used at the end of the film's credits, is absent from the soundtrack.

== Track listing ==
All music is composed by David Newman.

| No. | Title | Length |
|---|---|---|
| 1. | "Into the River" | 3:10 |
| 2. | "Escape" | 1:30 |
| 3. | "Serenity" | 0:50 |
| 4. | "Going for a Ride" | 2:24 |
| 5. | "Trading Station Robbery" | 3:07 |
| 6. | "River Goes Wild" | 1:28 |
| 7. | "River and Simon in Locker" | 0:55 |
| 8. | "Population Dead" | 3:55 |
| 9. | "Haven Destroyed" | 0:54 |
| 10. | "Shepherd Book's Last Words" | 1:00 |
| 11. | "You're Not a Reaver" | 0:56 |
| 12. | "Mal Decides" | 3:09 |
| 13. | "Truth / Mal's Speech" | 3:36 |
| 14. | "Space Battle" | 3:21 |
| 15. | "Crash Landing" | 1:59 |
| 16. | "Run to Black" | 2:55 |
| 17. | "Generator Room" | 3:06 |
| 18. | "Mal & Op Fight" | 2:11 |
| 19. | "Jayne & Zoe / Final Battle" | 2:44 |
| 20. | "Funeral / Rebuilding Serenity" | 2:19 |
| 21. | "Prep for Flight" | 1:33 |
| 22. | "Love" | 1:06 |
| 23. | "End Credits" | 1:38 |
| Total length: | | 49:53 |

== Reviews ==
- David Newman - Serenity Original Motion Picture Soundtrack, by Spence D. at IGN.com
- Music in the 'Verse: Firefly and Serenity by Steve Townsley at tracksounds.com
