= Lee Loughridge =

Colorist

- Areas: Inker, Colourist
- Notable works: Batman Adventures

Lee Loughridge is an artist who has worked as a colorist in the comics industry. He is known for his work on the various Batman Adventures titles.

== Bibliography ==
Loughridge's other work includes such titles as:

- Accelerate
- Angel
- Arkham Asylum: Living Hell
- The Batman Adventures
- The Final Night
- Just Imagine...
- 100% Marvel
- Marvel Zombies Return (Marvel Comics, 2009)
- Saucer Country
- Stumptown
- The Mask: I Pledge Allegiance to the Mask
- Fight for Tomorrow

== Awards ==
Loughridge was nominated for the International Horror Guild Award for best illustrated narrative in 2001 for his work on the comic edition of The House on the Borderland. He was also nominated for a Hugo Award for his work on Fables; War and Pieces.

He has been recognized for his work with a nomination for the Comics' Buyer's Guide Favorite Colorist Award in 2004.
