= Serenity: Those Left Behind =

Comic book

- Cover of the trade paperback, collecting the series. Art by Adam Hughes

Publication information
- Publisher: Dark Horse Comics
- Schedule: Monthly
- Format: Limited series
- Publication date: July 20, 2005 - September 9, 2005
- No. of issues: 3 (9 covers)
- Main character: Firefly main characters

Creative team
- Written by: Joss Whedon and Brett Matthews
- Artist: Will Conrad
- Colorist: Laura Martin

Serenity: Those Left Behind is a 2005 three-issue comic book limited series published by Dark Horse Comics. It was written by Brett Matthews with Joss Whedon credited for story, illustrated by Will Conrad, and colored by Laura Martin.

It is the first comic book series to be based on Whedon's short-lived 2002 television series Firefly and the 2005 feature film into which it was adapted, Serenity.

The story is set between the end of the series and the beginning of the film, and its plot includes the depiction of what happened to Lawrence Dobson, the Alliance covert operative who attempted to capture Simon and River Tam in the pilot episode of Firefly, also titled "Serenity".

== Synopsis ==
The story opens with Shepherd Book giving a sermon in a border-planet town, which is shortly revealed to be a diversion so Mal, Zoe, and Jayne can pull a heist and rob the town's bank.

The three soon get in a standoff with fellow outlaw Ott and his gang, who were tipped off to the job by an unknown party. Ott demands the loot, and Mal agrees, not wanting to risk the lives of his crew. Pushing his luck, Ott then asks Mal to give up his gun, as well. Mal threatens Ott to back down, but he persists. Mal briefly muses on how his gun was one of two things that got him through the war, and stuck with him afterwards (the other being Zoe). Mal drops his gun to the floor, but then kicks it into Ott's face, knocking out a few of his teeth. Ott orders his men to open fire, and a pitched firefight ensues. Ott's crew retreats with the loot, while Mal, Zoe, and Jayne pursue. They fail to stop Ott from escaping, and in an act of pure spite, he makes sure to announce their heist to the entire town first.

While the townspeople chase Mal and the others, thinking that they have the stolen money, Shepherd Book steals a transport shuttle and picks them up. With the townsfolk still in pursuit, Mal radios Wash, notifying him of the need to make their own hasty escape. Wash and Kaylee use Serenity to knock over a water tower, slowing down their pursuers long enough for the crew to reach safety.

Meanwhile, Lawrence Dobson, missing his right eye from his last encounter with Mal, is still on Whitefall. In the months since his "death", Dobson has carved out a new life for himself as a bandit leader, forming a gang and even building a hideout. He has made a deal with the Hands of Blue, who have been trying to recapture Simon and River Tam. Dobson, obsessed with killing Mal, claims he has the perfect plan, and needs only the support of the Alliance to make it easier.

After returning to Persephone, Badger approaches Serenity with a handful of goons, saying he only wants to pitch a new job to the crew. Not taking any chances, Zoe stuns Badger's hired muscle with fire-retardant gas as they attempt to board Serenity, and shoots them all dead. Serenity then takes off with Badger on board.

Badger explains to the crew that the Battle of Sturges (which he refers to as the bloodiest battle in the Unification War) was fought over a pile of money, which is supposedly still floating in the ruins of the battlefield, unclaimed, and that he recently came into possession of the exact coordinates. Mal says that he'll consider the job, telling Badger to get off his ship "before the stain sets". Badger is then left in the desert on Persephone to walk home.

Mal gathers the crew, telling them that he's decided to take Badger's job. Inara asks him to take her to her "duties" first, and Mal refuses. Mal insists that the job is more important, and Book pushes Mal to reconsider. When Book reminds Mal that he gave Inara his word that he would not interfere with her work, Mal states that the crew should understand that his word means nothing. Mal then provokes Book by saying that his word was no different from the Shepherd's preaching, and that when push came to shove, Book didn't pray, but stole a vehicle and did "what needs to be done to survive". Book loses his temper and strikes Mal in the face.

The crew travel to the coordinates given to them by Badger. Mal, Zoe, and Jayne board one of the wrecked ships to look for the money, but it soon becomes clear that there is no money and the whole thing was a set-up. Dobson and his henchmen ambush the three, demanding "an eye for an eye". Zoe and Jayne outdraw and kill all of Dobson's men, while Mal shoots out Dobson's other eye. Before leaving, Mal shoots him again, "just to be sure".

While Mal, Zoe, and Jayne are fighting Dobson, the Hands of Blue attempt to sneak aboard Serenity. Due in part to River's psychic abilities, Simon, Inara, and Kaylee are tipped off to the intrusion. After going to the cargo bay to investigate, Kaylee is attacked by one of the agents. Simon knocks the agent down with one of Jayne's exercise weights, causing him to fall back into his ship. Kaylee closes the airlock and continually jerry-rigs it to keep out the agents (who are continually trying to bypass the lock). Wash then flies Serenity through the remains of a derelict ship, knocking the agents' shuttle off Serenity. Mal orders Wash to "step on it", having safely re-entered the ship along with Zoe and Jayne. The Hands of Blue agents and their ship are subsequently incinerated by Serenity's engine flame.

Mal finally takes Inara to her original destination, where she leaves the ship for good, and he seems not to have given her the kind of goodbye he truly wanted to. Later, Shepherd Book stumbles upon Mal talking to himself, revealing his true feelings for Inara. Book tells Mal that he will also be leaving Serenity, fearing that his time on the ship has been corrupting him, without mentioning that he no longer trusts Mal.

The Alliance, having learned that Dobson's plan failed, passes the assignment to retrieve the Tams to the Operative. He accepts the mission without hesitation.

== Notable occurrences ==
- Lawrence Dobson, shot and left for dead at the end of the pilot episode of Firefly, is revealed to be alive.
- The Hands of Blue are killed, and are described as "independent contractors".
- It is revealed that the blue material that gives the Hands of Blue their name also extends to (and covers) their torso. The purpose of this material is never directly revealed.
- Inara Serra leaves Serenity. Derrial Book also states his intention of leaving, believing his time aboard has corrupted him.
- The Operative makes his first appearance in the comics, although he wears his sword at his side, rather than across his back as in Serenity. The sword itself is also depicted as some form of cavalry sabre, with an ornate hilt, rather than the Japanese-style blade he uses in the film.
- The twins, Fanty and Mingo, are first mentioned by Badger aboard Serenity. They are responsible for providing the crew with the payroll job pulled at the beginning of the film Serenity.

== Cover illustrations ==
Each of the three issues was released with three different covers, with each cover featuring one of the nine major characters, and each one illustrated by a different artist (total of 9 distinct UPC issue codes). The series was collected into a single volume, with a cover by Adam Hughes. All issue covers also appear within the compilation.

- Issue #1:
  - Captain Malcolm "Mal" Reynolds, illustrated by John Cassaday.
  - Jayne Cobb, illustrated by Bryan Hitch.
  - Inara Serra, illustrated by J. G. Jones.
- Issue #2:
  - Shepherd Book, illustrated by Tim Bradstreet.
  - Kaylee Frye, illustrated by Jo Chen.
  - Zoe Washburne, illustrated by Joe Quesada.
- Issue #3:
  - Hoban "Wash" Washburne, illustrated by Sean Phillips.
  - Simon Tam, illustrated by Leinil Francis Yu.
  - River Tam, illustrated by Joshua Middleton.
- Trade paperback:
  - Inara and Mal, illustrated by Adam Hughes.
- Hardcover Collection (Published October 24, 2007)
  - Mal, Zoe and Jayne, illustrated by Adam Hughes.

== Reaction ==
According to Dark Horse, the miniseries sold 85,000 copies.

On February 11, 2006, Dirk Wood of Dark Horse Comics confirmed at the WonderCon convention in San Francisco that Joss Whedon was writing another Serenity comic. The three-issue miniseries, Serenity: Better Days, began in March 2008. Details of the plot see the crew of Serenity pulling off a successful job which results in unexpected wealth.

== See also ==
- List of comics based on television programs
- List of comics based on films
