= Serenity (Firefly vessel) =

Fictional spacecraft from the television series Firefly

- First appearance: Firefly (2002)

Serenity is a fictional spacecraft that appears in Joss Whedon's Firefly television series and related works. Set in the 26th century, the series follows the nine-person crew of the Firefly-class vessel, a small transport ship, as they earn a living through various legal and illegal means. The ship is the main setting; it appears in all fourteen episodes, the film, and several comics.

The ship was designed by director Joss Whedon, production designer Carey Meyer, and visual effects supervisor Loni Peristere. Two contiguous sets were built, between them containing the entirety of the ship's interior. The digital model of the ship was created by Zoic Studios, who also developed methods to digitally replicate live-action filming techniques, a first for television. These allowed digital renderings of the ship to blend in with the documentary/found-footage filming style of the live-action scenes.

Serenity is described by Whedon as the "tenth character" of the series. Some reviews compare the ship to the Millennium Falcon in the Star Wars franchise.

== Fictional background ==
Serenity first appeared in the pilot episode of Joss Whedon's Firefly, which is set in the year 2517, in a star system to which humanity migrated after using up Earth's resources. She is the property of Malcolm "Mal" Reynolds (Nathan Fillion), a former sergeant who served on the losing side of a civil war that ended six years before the series began. Mal acquired Serenity from a used-spaceship dealer after the war (as depicted in flashbacks during "Out of Gas"), intending to hire a small crew and take various jobs to support himself and wartime comrade Corporal Zoe Alleyne, while keeping out of the way of the Alliance, the multi-planetary government they were fighting. Other flashbacks in "Out of Gas" show how the rest of the main crew came to join the ship; pilot Hoban "Wash" Washburne (Alan Tudyk), mechanic Kaylee Frye (Jewel Staite), and mercenary Jayne Cobb (Adam Baldwin), as well as Inara Serra (Morena Baccarin), a courtesan who rents one of Serenity's two shuttlecraft. At the start of the series, the episode "Serenity" depicts the arrival of the other three members of the ensemble cast as passengers aboard the ship: the preacher (or shepherd) Derrial Book (Ron Glass), the fugitive doctor Simon Tam (Sean Maher), and his psychic and psychotic sister River (Summer Glau).

In the original pilot episode, "Serenity", Serenity is described as a Firefly-class transport ship by an Alliance starship crew, while Shepherd Book identifies her as an "aught three" model, with both parties implying that the class is an old design. In the episode "The Train Job", which was created as a replacement pilot episode when Fox decided that the original pilot was not good enough to be aired, River identifies the ship as a "Midbulk transport, standard radion-accelerator core, classcode 03-K64, Firefly". The ship's name comes from the Battle of Serenity Valley, the final action of the civil war Mal and Zoe fought in. The revelation was made in a deleted scene from the episode "Serenity", where Zoe tells Simon, "Once you've been in Serenity [Valley], you never leave. You just learn to live there." The Serenity Valley connection is mentioned in the episode "Bushwhacked", although the reason behind the name is not given. The capabilities of the ship are not elaborated on in aired material, beyond the fact that she is small, unarmed, and defenseless except for her speed and "crybabies": decoy buoys used to mimic other ships (in the episode "Serenity") or Serenity herself (in the film Serenity). In 2007, Geoffrey Mandel, the graphic designer from the film, and Tim Earls, the series illustrator and film set designer, produced an official set of Serenity blueprints, which included technical data for the ship. According to the blueprints, Serenity was laid down in August 2459. The ship is 269 feet (82 m) long bow to stern, with a 170 feet (52 m) beam, and stands 79 feet (24 m) high when landed. Serenity has a curb weight of 282,500 pounds (128,100 kg), can carry 164,900 pounds (74,800 kg) of cargo and 18 passengers, can accelerate at 4.2 g, and has a range of 440 astronomical units when carrying minimal cargo.

Serenity and ships of her type are constantly talked down; in various episodes, Serenity is referred to as a "flying piece of go se (Mandarin Chinese for dog crap)", "luh-suh (garbage)", or "junk". However, in the episode "Our Mrs. Reynolds", a mechanic from a starship chop shop claims that while the ship is a load of worthless parts and isn't as attractive as other vessels, the value of a Firefly-class ship comes from its durability and ease of repair. Kaylee regularly defends the reputation of the ship, while Whedon regards Serenity as the tenth character of the series, as the relationships between the characters and the ship and how the audience reacts to the ship is as important as the relationships between and the reactions to the other main characters.

== Design and filming ==
The overall design of Serenity was conceived by Whedon, who handed it off to production designer Carey Meyer for fleshing out. The shape of the ship was conceived when Whedon was searching for a title for the show. While looking for something "that's got motion and strength", Whedon settled on 'firefly', which also conveyed the insignificance of the ship and crew in the grand scheme. Whedon also wanted to quickly establish how much space there was aboard the ship, and how its rooms sat in relation to each other, to avoid the impression that there were "1,400 decks and a holodeck and an all-you-can-eat buffet in the back." He wanted a ship that looked and felt like it was used and lived in, to the extent that he claims "One of the first things I thought was, 'I'm gonna have a ship with a toilet,'" which appeared as a pull-out drawer in Mal Reynolds' cabin in "Serenity".

The design that Whedon, Meyer, and Loni Peristere (the visual effects supervisor from Zoic Studios) fleshed out was based on Whedon's decision that the ship would have the qualities of a bird mixed with those of a firefly. The long neck was one of the bird-like features, while the enlarged abdomen reflected the bug. The insect metaphor also reflected the ship's position in relation to the Alliance, the all-powerful government in the series. The main method of propulsion was developed from the idea of using a fusion explosion behind the ship to propel it at greater speeds than normal. This justified causing the ship's tail to glow like a firefly before the explosion caused the ship to rocket away. For secondary propulsion, to allow such a large object to fly gracefully in atmosphere and perform controlled landings, the group added two engines, each on a stubby wing. The engines rotate, giving Serenity VTOL capability, and would fold down and in like a bird's wings when the ship was inactive. Because the director, production designer, and visual effects supervisor collaborated on the design, Serenity shows less inconsistency between the size of the interior and exterior than other science-fiction spaceships.

=== Interior ===
The interior of the ship has two levels or decks. The upper deck starts at the head of the ship, with the bridge area. This leads to the neck corridor, which contains ladders down the crew quarters, an airlock to Serenity's exterior in a small side corridor, and connects the bridge to the rest of the ship. Next along is the mess and galley, which is followed by another passageway leading to the engine room at the rear of the ship. The lower deck starts with the main airlock, which leads directly into the cargo bay. Behind the cargo bay is a common area and the ship's infirmary. At the back end of the lower deck is a number of passenger quarters, ranging in size from small rooms (used by the characters) to small tubes like those in capsule hotels (not seen in detail on screen). The two decks are linked by stairwells between the neck and the cargo bay, and between the aft passageway and the common area. A network of gantries around the walls of the cargo bay extend from the nearby stairwells, and also provide access to the ship's two short-range shuttlecraft, one of which is hired out to Inara as her place of residence and business.

Whedon came up with the idea of building each deck of Serenity as a contiguous set, so that he could establish the size of the spaceship, and film scenes where the actors could be followed as they moved around the ship. The two sets were built on separate sound stages, making second unit filming possible. The opening to the film highlights this: a 4 1/2 minute shot (technically two shots connected together) near the start of the movie follows Mal from the bridge as he walks along the entire upper deck set, down a set of stairs near the engine room (where the cut is hidden by a whip pan from Mal to Simon) and back along the lower deck set to the cargo bay. This shot (and similar shots in the early episodes) were intended to establish the space which made up the ship, and where locations were in relation to each other.

Having the sets constructed as contiguous decks had several advantages for the cast and crew: Joss Whedon would physically move around on the sets to help him in writing or blocking difficult scenes, Summer Glau (playing River Tam) would often walk around the set to get into character and prepare for filming, while other cast members would use the set as a green room or a place to relax. The sets were built with all walls and ceilings, but designed so that walls, ceilings, and large objects could be moved to facilitate filming. Director of photography David Boyd chose to use small hand-held cameras for interior filming, which in turn enhanced the 'documentary' feel Whedon wanted for the series. Lighting was provided by lights built into the ship, which were designed to appear practical and realistic.

Serenity's layout, as sketched by Joss Whedon and Carey Meyer. The positions of the various rooms, as well as the general color attributed to them, are depicted.

Carey Meyer developed a color scheme for the rooms, generally ranging from warm colors near the engine room to cool colors near the bridge. Each room or space was also intended to have its own character, which would reflect the characters that spent the most time in each room. For example, the warm, rusty brown color of the engine room reflected both the engine's attributes of heat and power, as well as the earthiness, warmth, sexuality, and optimism of Kaylee (Jewel Staite), while the clean, sterile, and white/blue infirmary was both a match to Simon Tam's role as a doctor and the character's personality and Alliance background.

The dining room consisted of yellow walls (which were intended to be warm but more diffuse when compared to the engine room) that were decorated with a floral pattern, which Whedon envisioned as being the work of Kaylee. A large wooden table was located in the centre of the dining room, which lent itself to communal scenes.

The bridge area was the 'home' of Wash (Alan Tudyk), the ship's pilot. It was designed to merge the ideas of a ship's bridge and an aircraft's cockpit: somewhere that resembled the packed-in command area of the space tug Nostromo from Alien, but had enough space to allow all nine characters to be present and interact. Originally, the area in front of the two control consoles was designed as a lounge area, but it was removed as Whedon wanted the bridge to be "about business". The pilot station was decorated with Wash's toy dinosaurs, and had the pilot's "magic three switches", which Alan Tudyk found himself always flicking first when instructed to do anything during scenes (from activating communications to taking off and running away) because they "made good 'chicky' sounds".

The crew quarters were built separately from the main sets. They were constructed with a curve to one wall, to reinforce the shape of the ship's neck and remind viewers that they were on a spaceship. Mal's cabin set had the hatch and immediately surrounding hallway constructed for a scene in the episode "Serenity". The cargo bay airlock was designed so it could be removed from the rest of the set and transported to other locations, allowing it to be 'docked' with sets representing other ships or placed on location, allowing for continuous filming from inside the airlock through to the other set or out onto the location, while avoiding the need to intercut between location and soundstage filming. This was used twice: first in "Bushwhacked" to 'connect' Serenity to a disused Power Rangers spaceship set adapted for the episode, then again in the film for the ship's second visit to Haven.

=== Exterior sets ===
The lower deck set incorporated the front of the ship, including the cargo bay door and surrounding hull, the forward landing gear, and the engine nacelles, as well as a small amount of soundstage area where scenery could be placed in front of the ship. Digital effects were used to add the rest of the ship in during post-production. The lower deck was built on Stage 16, which was modified during the filming of Alien Resurrection to include a 36-by-45-metre (118 by 148 ft) water tank under the floor for underwater scenes. The tank was located under Serenity's cargo bay door, which Whedon planned to use in a later episode: several characters would run through the cargo bay and jump off the ramp into the tank, which would be dressed as a lake or lagoon.

The section of outer hull from the base of the neck to the windows above the dining/common area was also constructed. Nicknamed the 'tortoiseshell', this set was used for scenes in "Bushwhacked", "Trash", and "Objects in Space".

=== Digital model ===
Loni Peristere from Zoic Studios was brought in early during the design process to co-ordinate the visual effects from the series, including those related to Serenity. Peristere was instructed by Whedon to depart from the standard 'filming' techniques for digital sequences, and instead replicate the documentary style of filming Whedon intended for the live-action sequences. As part of this process, Peristere developed rules for 'filming' the exterior of the ship; primarily that the digital sequences would be created as if filmed from a 'chase spaceship', with a camera operator trying to keep Serenity in frame, while reacting to the movements of both Serenity and his own ship. Zoic was the first company to use a realistic frame of reference for digitally created scenes for a television series, although Industrial Light and Magic was the first overall: similar effects were created for Star Wars: Episode II – Attack of the Clones, which was released four months before Firefly began airing. The visual effects created for the spaceship chase scene in the episode "Serenity" won Zoic the 2003 Emmy Award for Outstanding Special Visual Effects in a Series.

Most of the scenes involving the ship were rendered in LightWave 3D. Other software used included Maya and mental ray for rendering, Adobe Photoshop and Body Paint for texturing, and Combustion or Adobe After Effects for compositing.

Visual effects for Serenity's movie appearance were again created by Zoic, this time with Emile Edwin Smith in charge.

=== Filming model ===
A 15-foot (4.6 m) practical model was built by Grant McCune Design for the crash-landing sequence in the film (from 1.25:25 to 1.26:02), which was the only non-CGI exterior of the entire ship used in either the series or film. The scene was filmed as miniature effects, and was enhanced digitally by Illusion Arts, who added sparks, debris, and an exploding engine.

=== Differences between series and film ===
External image
- Animation showing the difference between the engine pod digital models used in the television series and movie

Among the changes made to Serenity between the series and the movie, the most significant were to the digital model. The digital model for the ship was re-used from the series, but as it was created for standard-definition television, the level of texture and detail had to be significantly increased to the 2K digital cinema definition standard. After Firefly, Zoic had upgraded their computing infrastructure to be capable of producing effects at the level required for high-definition television, primarily for work on the reimagined Battlestar Galactica. The re-detailing of Serenity took twelve weeks to complete, and went down to the level of showing individual rivets.

One of the main changes to the set was to redesign the interior of the cargo bay. The interior walls were changed from straight to slightly curved sides—designer Tim Earls had learned that rounded surfaces are better for containing pressure.

Most of the changes to the sets were minor, although the combined effect was described by Morena Baccarin, who played Inara Serra, as "like coming into your living room and your mom rearranged all the furniture and things aren't where they were but you're still home."

== Reaction ==
Many of the reviewers of the series and movie reflect the common in-universe opinion of the ship; describing Serenity as a "battered old jalopy of a space craft", "a rattletrap transport ship ... held together by 26th-century chewing gum and duct tape", or "a ship that seems to be held together with baling wire and paper clips", Some reviewers, while making comparisons between Firefly's Malcolm Reynolds and Han Solo from Star Wars, invoke the Millennium Falcon when talking about Serenity: "a scrap heap of a spaceship in the Millennium Falcon mold", or "a Millennium Falcon-style rust bucket".

=== Cameo appearances ===
The popularity of Serenity has resulted in several cameo appearances in other science fiction works.

In the 2003 Battlestar Galactica miniseries pilot, a ship resembling Serenity appears in the background of the scene where Laura Roslin (Mary McDonnell) is diagnosed with breast cancer. Serenity is one of several spaceships inserted as cameos into digital effects scenes by Zoic Studios, the company responsible for digital effects in both Firefly and Battlestar Galactica.

In Firefly, several ships from Star Wars were inserted as cameos (including a Lambda-class shuttle in "Serenity" and a Mobquet Transport from the Dark Empire comics in "Shindig" and "War Stories"). In reply, Thomas Hodges, the artist for 2006 Star Wars webcomic Evasive Action drew Serenity in one of the scenes.

In the musical film Dr. Horrible's Sing-Along Blog, a collection of pots and pans hanging in a window in Dr. Horrible's lab created a silhouette resembling Serenity. As Dr. Horrible was created by Joss Whedon and involved Nathan Fillion as one of the cast (both people associated with Firefly) it was assumed by fans that the silhouette was an actual Serenity model, or that the pans were deliberately hung to resemble the starship. According to Jed Whedon (Joss Whedon's brother and a member of the production team), the pan-silhouette was not set up for filming but already present in the house they used as the shooting location, and was likely unintentional.

The ship also makes a brief appearance in Steven Spielberg's film Ready Player One.

=== Recreations ===
Serenity has also been reproduced and detailed in various forms, primarily as merchandise such as keychains and printed t-shirts.

In August 2006, Dark Horse Comics released a 6-inch (15 cm) ornament of the ship. Following the success of the product, Dark Horse announced a limited edition ornament of Serenity in her Reavers 'camouflage' from the movie in December, with the production quantity determined by the number of pre-orders between then and March 2007.

Quantum Mechanix has released two sets of blueprints for the ship: first as a 10-page limited edition run of 750 sets in April 2007, then as a 33-page general release, which was smaller in size but contained additional information about both Serenity and the overall ship class. The blueprints were created by Geoffrey Mandel (the graphic designer from the film) and Tim Earls (the series illustrator and film set designer), with information contributed by those who worked on the sets and CGI models.

The creation of the blueprints was "a nice side effect" of research done by Quantum Mechanix and The FX Company as part of a project to produce an 18-inch (46 cm, approximately 1:180 scale), screen-accurate collectors model. The hand-built and -painted model, completed after three years work and titled Serenity: The Big Damn Replica, was unveiled online on 21 July 2009, then physically at San Diego Comic-Con a few days later. The replica model went into production at the end of October and was limited to 1,000 ships.
