= Malcolm Reynolds =

Character from "Firefly"

- Firefly character
- Nathan Fillion as Malcolm Reynolds
- First appearance: "Serenity" (2002)
- Last appearance: Serenity (2005)
- Created by: Joss Whedon
- Portrayed by: Nathan Fillion

In-universe information
- Nicknames: Mal, Captain, Captain Tight Pants (Kaylee)
- Gender: Male
- Occupation: Captain of Serenity
- Spouses: "Saffron"
- Relatives: Maude Reynolds (mother)
- Homeworld: Shadow
- Date of birth: 2486-09-20

Malcolm "Mal" Reynolds is a fictional character and the protagonist of the Firefly franchise. Mal is played by actor Nathan Fillion in the 2002 TV series Firefly and the 2005 film Serenity. In the series, Mal is a former Browncoat sergeant and the captain of the "Firefly-class" spaceship Serenity. The character was named at No. 18 in TV Guide's Greatest Sci-Fi Legends list in 2004.

== Production details ==
Conceived by Joss Whedon, the character Malcolm Reynolds was the only definite character he had in mind when formulating the ensemble cast. He wanted a hero, but not a hero in the classic sense; someone that is "everything that a hero is not."

In the proposed pilot, Mal was much darker and considerably more closed-off. Fox network executives objected, and asked that Mal be "lightened up". For the second episode ("The Train Job"), Whedon created a more "jolly" Mal Reynolds.

Fillion shares his view on the motivations of the character he portrayed. Mal has lost so much that each character in the crew he has gathered on Serenity represents an aspect of himself he no longer has. "In Wash, he has a lust for life and a sense of humor he's lost. In Jayne, he has selfishness. In Book, he has spirituality. In Kaylee, he has innocence. Everybody represents a facet of himself that he has lost and that's why he keeps them close and safe, and yet at arm's length."

=== Casting ===
The role was originally written for Buffy the Vampire Slayer co-star Nicholas Brendon (who played Xander Harris); however, the shooting schedule conflicted with his commitment to Buffy.

Whedon approached Nathan Fillion to play the lead, and after explaining the premise and showing Fillion the treatment for the pilot, Fillion was eager for the role. Fillion was called back several times to read for the part before he was cast. He noted that "It was really thrilling. It was my first lead and I was pretty nervous, but I really wanted that part and I wanted to tell those stories."

=== Costume design ===
Los Angeles prop shop Applied Effects was approached by Randy Erikson to create Mal's main gun, a "Moses Brothers Self-Defense Engine Frontier Model B", and gave them a week and a half. Erikson provided a foamcore conceptual mockup and the base guns, one of which was a five-shot .38 caliber Taurus Model 85 revolver. Erikson researched American Civil War-era revolvers for inspiration and the final mockup had a brass or bronze look, with the revolver a little elongated. The biggest challenge was masking the shape of the original revolver and still keeping it operable.

On the TV series Firefly, a cast bronze pistol was used, but for the film Serenity, a more detailed replica was created which had moving action and a blank pistol hidden inside, so that it could be fired in close-ups. Since this version was quite heavy, a resin replica was also constructed, which in addition to being less tiring for the actors to carry, could be thrown or dropped with less fear of injury. Nonfunctional replicas of the gun are commercially available for fans and collectors.

GBB Custom Gunleather was tasked with creating Mal's gun holster, which was made out of oak-tanned carving leather. The character's coat, a relic of his time as a Browncoat, was a collaboration between Firefly costume designer Shawna Trpcic and Jonathan A. Logan, a leather artist. Trpcic sketched her idea and a cloth mockup was created before the final was made with domestic-farmed deerskin. The cuffs are actually the sleeves folded back, evoking the style of Oriental robes with their silk linings. Two coats were made for the character, one called "Number 1" coat and another called "The Hero" coat. The Number 1 coat's bullet hole is drawn in, while The Hero version has a detailed cut and sewn repair. As with the gun, replicas of Malcolm Reynolds' coat have also been made available commercially for fans.

== Character biography ==
Malcolm's main mission is to keep his crew alive and to keep his ship flying. As Firefly writer Tim Minear stated in an interview: "It's just about getting by. That's always been the mission statement of what the show is — getting by." In Serenity, Mal says of himself: "[If the] Wind blows Northerly, I go North."

Mal was raised by his mother and "about 40 hands" on a ranch on the planet Shadow. Though Mal usually seems more practical than intellectual, he occasionally surprises his friends by displaying familiarity with disparate literature varying from the works of Xiang Yu to poems by Samuel Taylor Coleridge.

Mal volunteered for the Independents army during the Unification War against the Alliance, gaining the rank of sergeant during that time. His loyal second-in-command Zoe was by his side for most of the war, surviving many dangerous conflicts with him. The show mentions three such battles, including the Battle of Du-Khang in 2510 (shown in "The Message") and a long winter campaign in New Kashmir (as told by Zoe in "War Stories") where he commanded a platoon. Mal was also involved in the ground campaign during the Battle of Sturges (as seen in the comic book Serenity: Those Left Behind), which according to Badger was the "bloodiest and shortest battle in all the war", although Mal considers it a distant second. Mal fought in many more battles, but the turning point for him and the Independents came with their physical and emotional defeat at the Battle of Serenity Valley on the planet Hera. On-screen information in Serenity shows him to have been attached to the 57th Overlanders Brigade. In the series pilot, Badger calls it the "Balls and Bayonets Brigade". A deleted scene in Serenity indicates that this was a nickname given to the unit.

After the war, Mal acquired his own ship, a derelict 03-K64 Firefly-class transport. Mal named the ship Serenity after the Battle of Serenity Valley, the decisive battle of the Unification War.

== Reception ==
Fillion won the "Cinescape Genre Face of the Future Award — Male" award by the Academy of Science Fiction, Fantasy & Horror Films, USA for his role as Malcolm Reynolds. Fillion also won the SyFy Genre Awards in 2006 for Best Actor/Television and was runner-up for Best Actor/Movie.

The character was named #18 in TV Guide's "Greatest Sci-fi legends" list in 2004. In 2008, Empire ranked Mal as #34 on their list of the 100 Greatest Movie Characters. In 2011, SFX Magazine voted Mal Reynolds #1 on their Top 100 Sci-Fi icons of the century.

In her review of the film Serenity for The New York Times, Manohla Dargis had this to say about the character and Nathan Fillion: "Mal is no Neo redux; he's closer to Indiana Jones, if absent Harrison Ford's rakishly handsome looks and star magnetism. Like the rest of the cast, Mr. Fillion is a charming performer, but he borrows rather than owns the screen, which dovetails with Mr. Whedon's modest aspirations for this film."
