= River Tam =

Fictional character of the Firefly franchise

- Firefly character
- Summer Glau as River Tam
- First appearance: "Serenity" (2002)
- Last appearance: Serenity (2005)
- Created by: Joss Whedon
- Portrayed by: Summer Glau, Skylar Roberge (young), Hunter Ansley Wryn (young)

In-universe information
- Gender: Female
- Occupation: Crew member of Serenity
- Relatives: Gabriel Tam (father); Regan Tam (mother); Simon Tam (brother)
- Homeworld: Osiris

River Tam is a fictional character from the Firefly franchise.

River is portrayed by Summer Glau in the 2002 TV series Firefly and the 2005 film Serenity. In 2005, Glau won the SFX magazine award for Best Actress for her role in Serenity. Glau later won a Saturn Award for Best Supporting Actress, again for her role as River in Serenity in May 2006. Glau was also runner up for Best Actress/Movie in the SyFy Genre Awards for 2006.

== Production details ==
Joss Whedon selected Glau for the role after having previously worked with her on another of his shows, Angel. River Tam was Glau's first major role. Glau's inexperience assisted her in playing the character: she likened River's emotional withdrawal to her own initial apprehension on the set.

In many of the hand-to-hand combat scenes featuring the character, particularly those in Serenity, Glau's own experience in ballet dancing was incorporated into her fight choreography.

== Depiction ==
During River's early childhood, she grew up alongside her brother, Simon, part of the wealthy Tam family on the "core" planet of Osiris. She was graceful and intellectually gifted. She is described as having a strong thirst for knowledge and a love for and intuitive grasp of dance. By the time she was fourteen years old, she had grown "bored" with her studies and enrolled in a graduate program for physics.

It was at this point that she was sent to a government learning facility known as "The Academy". While her parents and Simon believed the Academy was a private school meant to nurture the gifts of talented children, it was in fact a cover for a government experiment in creating assassins. While in the hands of Alliance doctors and scientists, River was secretly experimented on, including surgery that damaged her amygdala. According to Simon, the Alliance attempted to isolate River from her family, though she managed to send a call for help by putting a coded message in a letter to her brother. Simon decoded the message and set out to rescue his then sixteen-year-old sister, despite his parents' insistence that he was being paranoid. In his quest to locate and free River, Simon enlisted the aid of anti-governmental groups, exhausting his personal fortune and sacrificing a promising medical career.

The R. Tam sessions depict her descent into insanity and portray hints of her psychic abilities. She references the "G-23 Paxilon Hydrochlorate", which would later be a plot point in the film Serenity, and mentions the Academy's first subject "dying on the table." The first session clip indicates she has strong "intuitive" abilities and can easily understand complex subjects.

== Reception ==
In 2005, Glau won the SFX Magazine award for Best Actress for her role as River in Serenity. Glau later won a Saturn Award for Best Supporting Actress, again for her role as River in Serenity in May 2006. Glau was also runner up for Best Actress/Movie in the SyFy Genre Awards for 2006.

The nature of the character and her role in the franchise has garnered praise from various reviewers. Some have positively likened the character's erratic behavior to autism. Dr. Karin Beeler of the University of Northern British Columbia compared and contrasted River to Buffy Summers, protagonist of the Buffy the Vampire Slayer franchise (also created by Joss Whedon), in her book Seers, "Witches" and Psychics on Screen: An Analysis of Women Visionary Characters in Recent Television and Film. Beeler labeled the character an anti-heroine, in comparison to the more heroic role of Buffy Summers. Film critic and horror author Michael Marano also compared the character to Buffy, citing the two characters' combat prowess as similarities and describing River as the apotheosis of Joss Whedon's strong female characters.
