= Brett Matthews =

American comics/television writer

- Education: Wesleyan University
- Writing career
- Genres: comics and television
- Notable work: Better Days

Brett Matthews is an American writer of comics and television. Matthews received Hugo Award nominations for his script for "Heart of Gold" and in the Graphic Story category for Serenity: Better Days.

== Education ==
Matthews graduated from Wesleyan University in 1999.

== Career ==
He was an assistant to Joss Whedon on television shows such as Buffy the Vampire Slayer, Angel, and Firefly. In addition, he scripted the Firefly episode Heart of Gold. In 2004, he wrote the screenplay for the Direct to DVD animated movie The Chronicles of Riddick: Dark Fury.

In comics, Matthews has co-written the Serenity comic book prequel mini-series Those Left Behind and Better Days with Joss Whedon. He is currently writing The Lone Ranger for Dynamite Entertainment. He has also written Daredevil, Spider-Man, and Wolverine comicbook specials for Marvel Comics.

He served as an executive story editor for Supernatural. In addition, he was credited as a supervising producer and co-executive producer for The Vampire Diaries.

On April 26, 2017, MTV announced that Matthews will be the main show runner for the third season of the slasher television series Scream. The show will undergo a reboot with a new cast and setting. Matthews, Queen Latifah, Shakim Compere, and Yaneley Arty will be credited as executive producers for the series under Flavor Unit Entertainment. On June 24, 2019, it was announced that the rebooted Scream series would be moving to VH1 ahead of the premiere of the third season. The third season, titled Scream: Resurrection, premiered on July 8, 2019.

Matthews was an executive producer and writer for the CW series, Legacies. Currently, Matthews serves as an executive producer and writer on the Prime series We Were Liars.
