= Serenity (2005 film) =

2005 film directed by Joss Whedon

- Theatrical release poster
- Directed by: Joss Whedon
- Written by: Joss Whedon
- Based on: Firefly by Joss Whedon
- Produced by: Barry Mendel
- Starring: Nathan Fillion; Alan Tudyk; Adam Baldwin; Summer Glau; Chiwetel Ejiofor
- Cinematography: Jack Green
- Edited by: Lisa Lassek
- Music by: David Newman
- Production companies: Universal Pictures; Barry Mendel Productions
- Distributed by: Universal Pictures (United States); United International Pictures (International)
- Release dates: August 22, 2005 (EIFF); September 30, 2005 (United States)
- Running time: 119 minutes
- Country: United States
- Language: English
- Budget: $39 million
- Box office: $40.4 million

Serenity is a 2005 American space Western film written and directed by Joss Whedon in his feature directorial debut. The film is a continuation of Whedon's short-lived 2002 Fox television series Firefly, taking place after the events of the final episode, with all of the main cast reprising their roles, including Nathan Fillion, Alan Tudyk, Adam Baldwin, and Summer Glau, while Chiwetel Ejiofor stars as a new character. Set in 2517, the story follows the crew of Serenity, a "Firefly-class" spaceship, whose captain and first mate are veterans of the Unification War, having fought on the losing Independent side against the Alliance. Their lives of smuggling and cargo-running are interrupted by a psychic passenger who harbors a dangerous secret.

Serenity was released in North America on September 30, 2005, by Universal Pictures to generally positive reviews and several accolades, including the Hugo Award for Best Dramatic Presentation, the Prometheus Special Award and the Nebula Award for Best Script, but underperformed at the box office.

== Plot ==
In the 26th century, humanity has colonized a new solar system. The central planets formed the Alliance and won a war against the outer planet Independents who resisted joining the Alliance. Child genius River Tam is conditioned by Alliance scientists into becoming a psychic and an assassin but is rescued as a teenager by her brother Dr. Simon Tam. During her training, River inadvertently read the minds of several top government officials and learned their secrets. Consequently, an Alliance agent known only as the Operative is tasked with recapturing her.

The siblings have found refuge aboard the transport spaceship Serenity with Captain Malcolm "Mal" Reynolds; first mate Zoe Washburne; her husband, pilot Hoban "Wash" Washburne; mercenary Jayne Cobb; and mechanic Kaylee Frye. Despite Simon's objections, Mal brings River on a bank robbery. River warns them that savage and cannibalistic Reavers are coming. They escape, but Simon decides he and River will leave Serenity at the next port. Once there, however, a subliminal message in a television commercial causes River to attack numerous bar patrons, and Mal takes the siblings back aboard the ship. The crew contacts reclusive hacker Mr. Universe, who discovers the message designed to trigger River's mental conditioning. He notes River whispered "Miranda" before attacking and warns that someone else has viewed the footage.

Mal receives an invitation from courtesan Inara Serra. Realising it is a trap, Mal goes to confront the Operative who promises to let him go free if he hands over River. Mal barely escapes. Miranda is discovered to be a planet located beyond a region of space swarming with Reavers. The crew flies to the planet Haven but find it devastated and their old friend Shepherd Book mortally wounded. They realize the Operative has killed anyone who gave them safe harbor and will continue until he gets River.

Mal has the crew disguise Serenity as a Reaver ship and they travel to Miranda undetected. They find its 30 million colonists dead, and a recording that explains an experimental chemical to suppress aggression had been added into Miranda's atmosphere. The population became so docile they stopped performing all activities of daily living and placidly died. A small proportion of them had the opposite reaction and became insanely aggressive and violent. The Alliance's actions created the Reavers and this was the secret in River's subconscious.

Mr. Universe agrees to broadcast the recording, but has secretly betrayed the crew to the Alliance. However, rather than pay him, the Operative kills him and prepares an ambush. Knowing this, the crew provoke the Reaver fleet into chasing them toward the Alliance armada. The Reavers and Alliance battle while Wash pilots Serenity through the crossfire. He crash lands near the broadcast tower before being fatally impaled by a Reaver spear.

The crew make a last stand against the Reavers to buy Mal time to broadcast the recording. The crew retreats behind a set of blast doors that fail to properly close. Simon is shot, and River dives through the doors to throw back Simon's medical kit and close the doors before the Reavers drag her away. At the transmitter, Mal fights the Operative, finally subduing him and forcing him to watch as the recording is broadcast. Mal returns to the crew. The blast doors open to reveal that River has killed all the Reavers. The Operative orders the Alliance troops to stand down.

The Operative provides medical aid and resources to repair Serenity. He tells Mal the broadcast has weakened the Alliance government, but while he will try to convince the Parliament that River and Simon are no longer threats, he warns that they may continue their pursuit in retribution for getting the word out. Serenity takes off, with River as Mal's new pilot.

== Cast ==
- Nathan Fillion as Captain Malcolm "Mal" Reynolds
- Gina Torres as Zoë Alleyne Washburne
- Alan Tudyk as Hoban "Wash" Washburne
- Morena Baccarin as Inara Serra
- Adam Baldwin as Jayne Cobb
- Jewel Staite as Kaywinnet Lee "Kaylee" Frye
- Sean Maher as Simon Tam
- Summer Glau as River Tam
- Ron Glass as Shepherd Book
- David Krumholtz as Mr. Universe
- Chiwetel Ejiofor as The Operative
- Michael Hitchcock as Dr. Mathias
- Sarah Paulson as Dr. Caron
- Yan Feldman as Mingo
- Rafael Feldman as Fanty

== Production ==
=== Development ===
The film is based on Firefly, a television series canceled by the Fox Broadcasting Company in December 2002, after 11 of its 14 produced episodes had aired. Attempts to have other networks acquire the series failed, and creator Joss Whedon started to sell it as a film. He had been working on a film script since the show's cancellation. Shortly after the cancellation, he contacted Barry Mendel, who was working with Universal Studios, and "flat-out asked him" for a way to continue the series as a film, including as a low-budget television film. Mendel introduced Whedon to then Universal executive Mary Parent. She had seen Firefly and immediately signed on to the project, even though Whedon had yet to create a story. Whedon remarked:

Universal came in where I thought nobody else would, and quite frankly, I'm not sure anybody else would've, with absolute faith and has maintained it. It's been the easiest process in terms of dealing with a studio that I've ever had. And they turned it into—not a blockbuster, which is not what I was trying to make, but not a low-budget movie either. They wanted to make a real movie out of it. They wanted to give us the scope that the show could never have had. So all I had to do was come up with a story that was worth that.

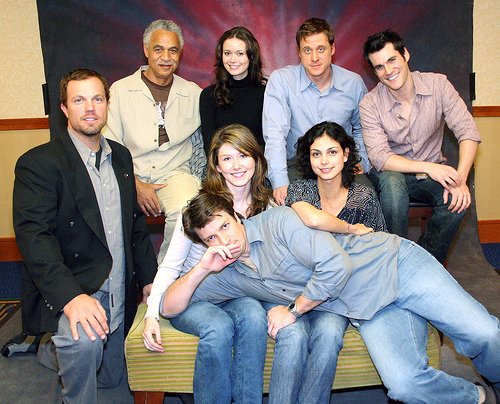
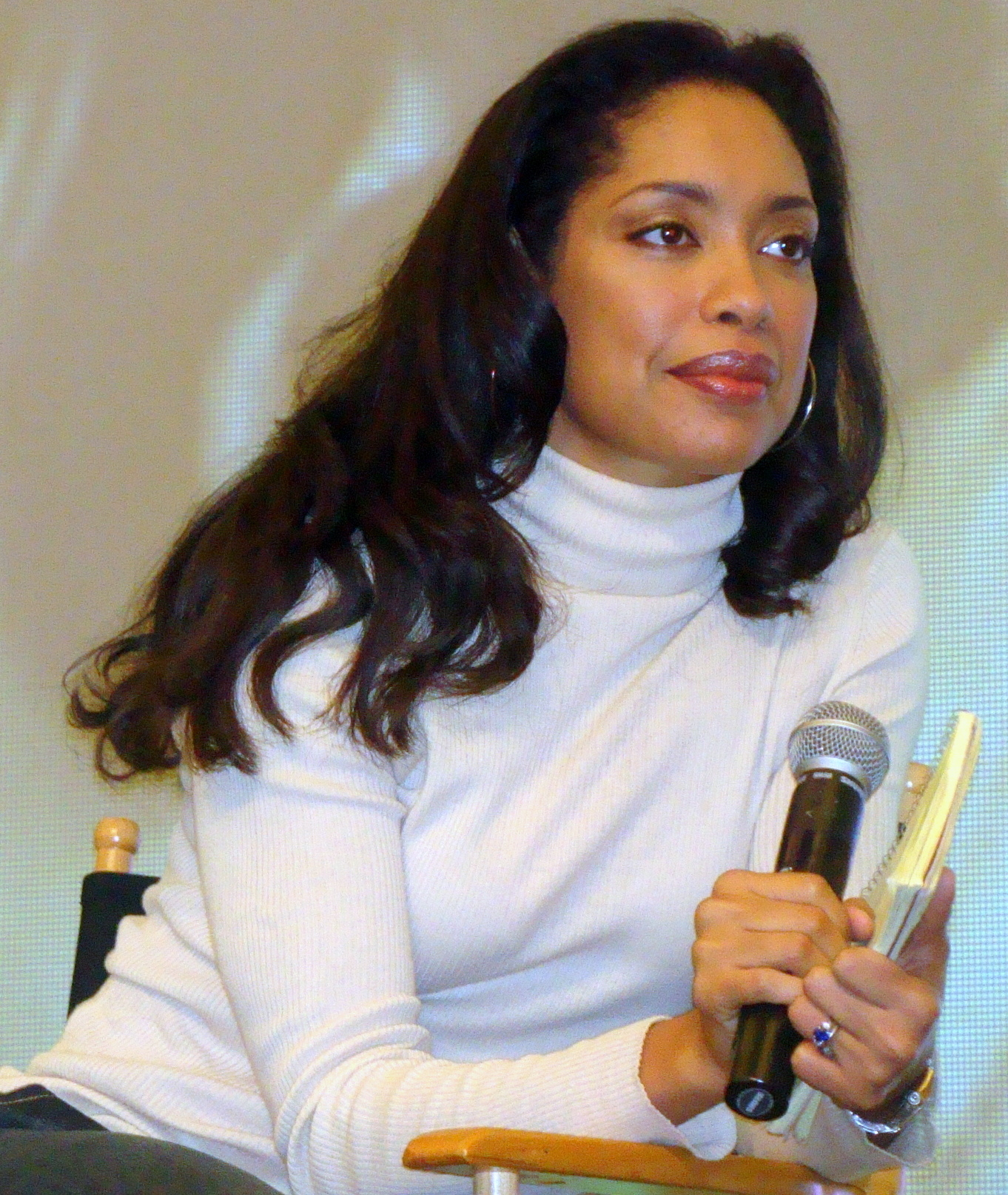
All nine actors of the Firefly main cast returned for Serenity. Left: from left to right, top to bottom: Ron Glass, Summer Glau, Alan Tudyk, Sean Maher, Adam Baldwin, Jewel Staite, Morena Baccarin and Nathan Fillion in 2005. Right: Gina Torres in 2008.

In July 2003, Whedon said that though there was interest in the project, "I won't know really until I finish a draft whether or not it's genuine." He felt that any film deal was contingent on keeping the show's original cast, though he later stated that retaining the cast was "never an issue" as Universal executives believed the cast suitable after watching every episode of the series.

In early September 2004, a film deal with Universal was publicly confirmed. Universal acquired the rights to Firefly shortly before the confirmation. Whedon felt that the strong sales of the Firefly DVD, which sold out in less than 24 hours after the pre-order announcement, "definitely helped light a fire and make them [Universal] go, 'Okay, we've really got something here.' It definitely helped them just be comfortable with the decisions they were making, but they really had been supporting us for quite some time already." Whedon felt it was "important people understand that the movie isn't the series", and so the project was titled Serenity.

=== Writing ===
After Universal acquired the film rights from Fox, Whedon began writing the screenplay. His task was to explain the premise of a television series that few had seen without boring new viewers or longtime fans. He based his story on original story ideas for Firefly's un-filmed second season. Whedon's original script was 190 pages, and attempted to address all major plot points introduced in the series. After presenting the script to Barry Mendel under the title "The Kitchen Sink", Whedon and Mendel collaborated on cutting down the script to a size film-able under his budget constraints. All nine principal cast members from the television series were scheduled to return for the movie, but Glass and Tudyk could not commit to sequels, leading to the death of their characters in the second draft of the script. The tightened script and a budget Mendel and Whedon prepared were submitted to Universal on a Friday and on the following Monday morning, Stacey Snider, then head of Universal, called Mendel to officially greenlight the movie.

Universal planned to begin shooting in October 2003, but delays in finishing the script postponed the start of shooting to June 2004.

=== Filming ===
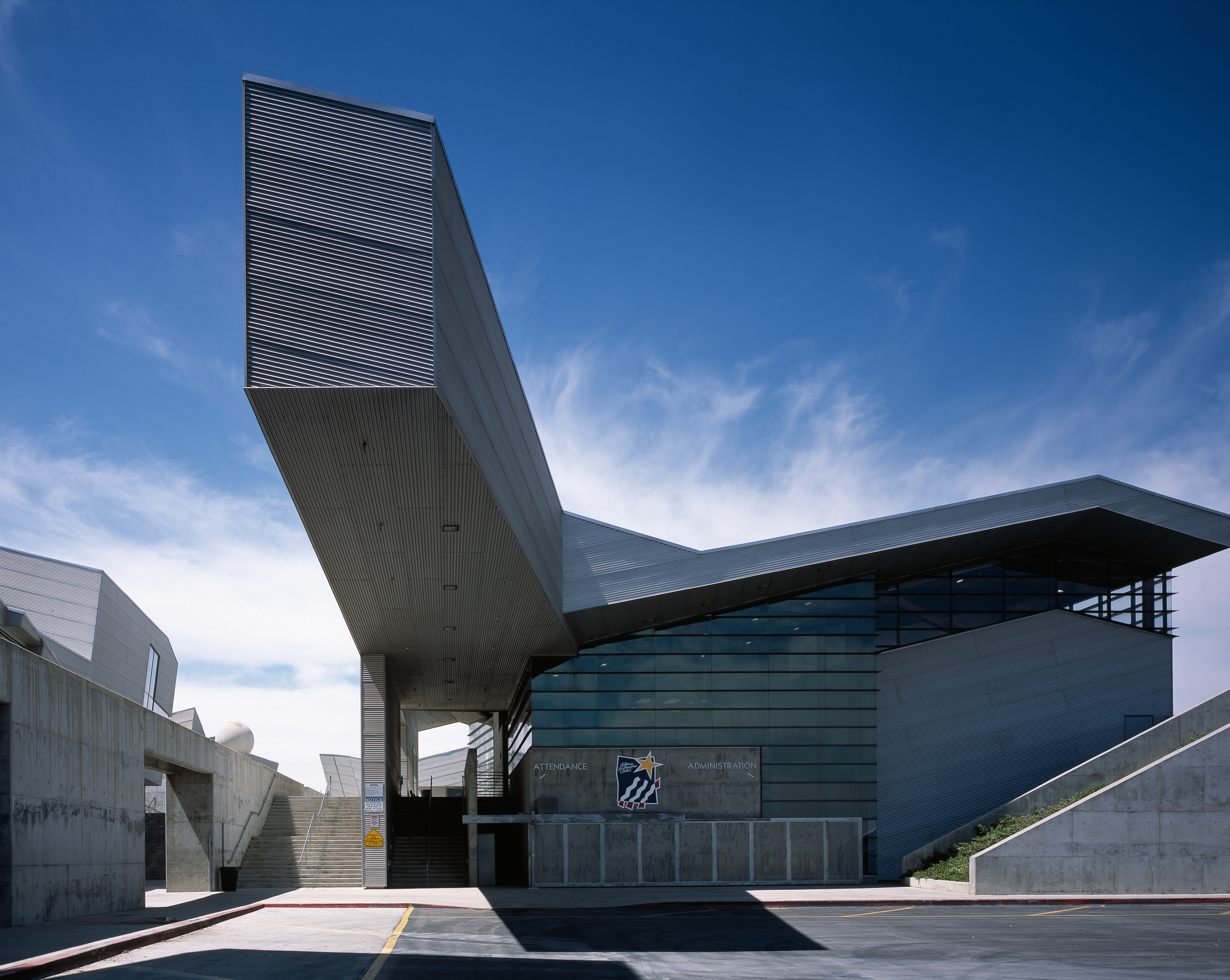
Diamond Ranch High School served as the location of the planet Miranda.

Principal photography for Serenity was originally estimated to require 80 days, lasting a typical 12 to 14 hours each, with a budget of over $100 million. Unwilling to approve of such a large budget, Universal Studios wished to shoot abroad to minimize production costs. However, Whedon, reluctant to uproot his family, insisted that filming take place locally and maintained that it was possible for a local production to cost fewer days and less than half the expected budget. On March 2, 2004, the film was greenlit for production with a budget of under $40 million. At the project's completion, the film spent $39 million, considered low for a science fiction action film featuring heavy special effects.

Serenity was filmed over a period of 50 ten-hour days, beginning June 3, 2004, and ending September 17, 2004. The film was primarily shot on Universal Studio sound stages with locations throughout Los Angeles. The sequence where the crew is pursued by Reavers after a bank robbery was filmed along the Templin Highway north of Santa Clarita. The shoot typically would have lasted 30 days, but the production completed filming the sequence in five days. Pyrotechnics were shot at Mystery Mesa, near Santa Clarita, over a period of three days rather than a typical two weeks. The scenes on the planet Miranda were filmed at Diamond Ranch High School in Pomona.

The production expected to save money by reusing the Serenity ship interior set from the Firefly television series, but the set was not available. Instead the ship was rebuilt, using DVD images of the television series as a guide. Construction was completed over 14 weeks on Universal Studios' Stage 12 by 23 supervised crews working independently but in coordination with one another. Universal was concerned about the extra cost but were satisfied when it was completed in just 14 weeks, according to executive producer David Lester.

=== Visual effects ===
As the budget for the film was considerably smaller than for the TV series, practical special effects were used as much as possible: if a computer-generated imagery (CGI) composite was required, as many tangible sets and props as possible were constructed to minimize the use of computer effects. The most technically challenging scene was the mule skiff chase. For budgetary reasons, a gimbal and CGI, much like those used in the pod race in Star Wars: Episode I – The Phantom Menace, were quickly ruled out. Instead, the crew fashioned a trailer with a cantilevered arm attached to the "hovercraft" and shot the scene while riding up Templin Highway north of Santa Clarita. Zoic Studios, the company that produced the graphics for the series, had to perform a complete overhaul of their computer model of Serenity, as the television model would not stand up to the high-definition scrutiny of cinema screens.

=== Musical score ===
In pre-production memos, Whedon described his vision for the score as "spare, intimate, mournful and indefatigable". Just as the landscape and speech drew from elements of the Western, he wished the same of the musical style and instrumentation. However, he did not want to step too far into Western clichés to "cause justified derision" and hoped the score would also draw from Chinese and other Asian musical elements. He wanted the musical elements "mixed up, hidden, or it's as much a cliché as the western feel. We don't want to be too specific about culture or time. We want to be comfortable enough with the sounds not to let them take us out of the story, but not so comfortable that we begin to be told where the story is." Music was to draw heavily on what could be carried, and he highlighted four instruments: voice, percussion, woodwind, strings particularly guitar. He cautioned against vocal orchestration, believing there to be only two voices in Hollywood and wishing to avoid both, and advised moderation in woodwind, feeling wind instruments to be "either too airy or too sophisticated".

Universal Studios wanted a composer with experience scoring films, ruling out Firefly's composer Greg Edmonson. Whedon first thought of Carter Burwell, of whom Whedon was a huge fan. However, Whedon later felt that Burwell was not the right choice because as the film changed, the needs of the score changed as well. Burwell found working on the project difficult as it required he work "opposite" to his usual approach. The production would have continued with Burwell, but his other obligations left him little time to compose an entirely new score for Serenity. Burwell was dropped from the project a few weeks before the scheduled February 2005 recording.

David Newman was recommended by Universal's music executives when Whedon requested a composer capable of "everything" and "quickly". Whedon's instructions to Newman for the ship Serenity's theme was something homemade and mournful, evoking the idea of pioneers who had only what they could carry. Whedon wished the theme to let viewers know they were now home. River Tam's theme was played on a uniquely shaped, square, antique piano that was slightly out of tune. The piano reminded Newman of River and composed a "haunting, haunted, vaguely eastern and achingly unresolved" theme that Whedon felt proved Newman's understanding of the film's musical needs.

The score was performed by the Hollywood Studio Symphony under Newman's direction. The official soundtrack was released September 27, 2005.

== Release ==
Serenity had its world premiere at the Edinburgh International Film Festival on August 22, 2005. The premiere sold out, and the festival arranged for two more screenings on August 24, which sold out in twenty-four hours, and in the "Best of the Fest" line-up on August 28. The film was theatrically released September 30, 2005.

Serenity was originally released on traditional film prints. Because the original 2K digital intermediate scans were readily available, the film was chosen by Universal Pictures to test conversion to a Digital Cinema Distribution Master of the film and to "test the workflow required to create a [Digital Cinema Package]." Serenity became the first film to fully conform to Digital Cinema Initiatives specifications, marking "a major milestone in the move toward all-digital projection".

=== Marketing ===
In April 2005, Universal launched a three-stage grassroots marketing campaign. A rough cut of the film was previewed in a total of thirty-five North American cities where the Firefly television series received the highest Nielsen ratings. The screenings did not bear the name of the film and relied on word-of-mouth within the fanbase for promotion. All screenings sold out in less than twenty-four hours, sometimes in as quickly as five minutes. The first screening was held May 5, 2005, in ten cities. The second screening on May 26 increased the number of cities to twenty. In the twenty-four hours following the announcement of the second screening, the Firefly fanbase launched trial and error efforts to uncover the theaters holding the screenings, leading the event to be sold out before the official listing was released. The third screening on June 23 was held in thirty-five cities. A final screening was held at San Diego Comic-Con, followed by a panel with Whedon and the cast.

==== Session 416 ====
Session 416, also known as the R. Tam Sessions, are a series of five short videos anonymously released by Whedon through various websites and message boards as viral marketing. The first video, bearing the title card "R. Tam, Session 416, Second Excerpt", was released on the iFilm website on August 16, 2005. By September 7, 2005, all five videos had been released.

The series grew out of Universal executives' request that Whedon supply content for an online viral marketing campaign (though a representative from Universal Studios denied knowledge of the videos' origin). He decided to explore events before the film and the television series. The clips were filmed with a "tiny" crew in a single day and are shot in grainy, low quality, black-and-white. They were later included on the Collector's Edition DVD.

The videos, sequenced out of chronological order, depict excerpts of counseling sessions between River Tam, played by Summer Glau, and her unnamed therapist, played by Whedon, while she is held at the Alliance Academy. They follow her change from shy and sweet child prodigy to the mentally unstable girl of the television series.

=== Home media ===
Serenity was released on Region 1 DVD, VHS and UMD on December 20, 2005. The DVD ranked #3 in sales for the week ending December 25, 2005. Bonus features on the DVD version include audio commentary from Whedon; deleted scenes and outtakes; a short introduction by Whedon for advance screenings; a hidden featurette on the creation of the Fruity Oaty Bar commercial; and three featurettes on the Firefly and Serenity universe, special effects, and the revival of the television series to film. Region 2 releases included an additional making-of featurette, and Region 4 releases included additional extended scenes, a tour of the set, a feature on cinematographer Jack Green, and a question-and-answer session with Whedon filmed after an advance screening in Australia.

Serenity was released on HD DVD on April 18, 2006, the first Universal Studios film released on the format. In January 2007, it became the first full-resolution rip of an HD DVD release uploaded to the BitTorrent network after its title key was ripped from a software player and released online.

A 2-disc Collector's Edition DVD was released for Region 1 on August 21, 2007. It included the special features on the Region 4 disc, except the question-and-answer session; Session 416, a documentary on the film; and a second commentary with Whedon and actors Nathan Fillion, Adam Baldwin, Summer Glau, and Ron Glass. The film was released on Blu-ray on December 30, 2008, adding to the special features a video version of the cast commentary, picture-in-picture visual commentary, two databases of in-universe material, and a digital tour of Serenity. Serenity was released on 4K UHD Blu-ray on October 17, 2017.

== Reception ==
=== Box office ===
Despite high anticipation, Serenity performed poorly at the box office. Although several pundits predicted a #1 opening, the film opened at #2 in the United States, taking in $10.1 million on its first weekend, spending two weeks in the top ten, and closed on November 17, 2005, with a domestic box office gross of $25.5 million. Movie industry analyst Brandon Gray described Serenity's box office performance as "like a below average genre picture".

Serenity's international box office results were mixed, with strong openings in the UK, Portugal and Russia, but poor results in Spain, Australia, France and Italy. United International Pictures canceled the film's theatrical release in at least seven countries, planning to release it directly to DVD instead. The box office income outside the United States was $14.9 million, with a worldwide total of $40.4 million.

=== Critical reception ===
On Rotten Tomatoes, the film has an approval rating of 82% based on 187 reviews, with an average rating of 7.15/10. The site's critical consensus states: "Snappy dialogue and goofy characters make this Wild Wild West soap opera in space fun and adventurous." On Metacritic the film has a weighted average score of 74 out of 100, based on reviews from 34 critics, indicating "generally favorable reviews". Audiences surveyed by CinemaScore gave the film an average grade of "A" on an A+ to F scale.

Ebert and Roeper gave the film a "Two Thumbs Up" rating. Roger Ebert, in his review for the Chicago Sun-Times, gave the film three out of four stars, commenting that it is "made of dubious but energetic special effects, breathless velocity, much imagination, some sly verbal wit and a little political satire". "The movie plays like a critique of contemporary society", he observed, also stating that in this way it was like Brave New World and Nineteen Eighty-Four. Peter Hartlaub in the San Francisco Chronicle called it "a triumph", comparing its writing to the best Star Trek episodes. Manohla Dargis of The New York Times described it as a modest but superior science fiction film. Science fiction author Orson Scott Card called Serenity "the best science fiction film ever", further stating "If Ender's Game can't be this kind of movie, and this good a movie, then I want it never to be made. I'd rather just watch Serenity again."

USA Today film critic Claudia Puig wrote that "the characters are generally uninteresting and one-dimensional, and the futuristic Western-style plot grows tedious". Derek Elley of Variety declared that the film "bounces around to sometimes memorable effect but rarely soars".

=== Awards ===
Serenity won several awards after its release. It won the Hugo Award for Best Dramatic Presentation—Long Form, the Nebula Award for Best Script, and the Prometheus Special Award. The film was also named film of the year by Film 2005 and FilmFocus, and it was determined by SFX magazine to be the best science fiction movie of all time in 2007. IGN Film awarded Serenity Best Sci-Fi, Best Story, and Best Trailer for the year, and it won second for Overall Best Movie after Batman Begins. The SyFy Genre Awards awarded it runner-up in the categories for Best Movie, Best Actor in a film (Nathan Fillion), and Best Actress in a film (Summer Glau), losing in all categories to Harry Potter and the Goblet of Fire. Serenity later ranked 383 on Empire magazine's 500 Greatest Films of All Time and 90 of the 301 Greatest Movies of All Time as voted by the magazine's readers.

=== Cultural impact ===
NASA astronaut Steven Swanson, an ardent fan of the series, took the Region 1 Firefly and Serenity DVDs with him on Space Shuttle Atlantis' STS-117 mission, which lifted off on Friday June 8, 2007, to be added to the ISS entertainment library.

On February 20, 2009, NASA announced an online poll to name Node 3 of the ISS; NASA-suggested options included Earthrise, Legacy, Serenity, and Venture. At the March 20, 2009 poll close, 'Serenity' led those four choices with 70% of the vote. In the end, the poll was discarded and the node was named 'Tranquility'.

==== Charity screenings ====
Beginning in January 2006, fans (with Universal's blessing) began organizing charity screenings of Serenity to benefit Equality Now, a human rights organization supported by Joss Whedon. By mid-June, 41 such screenings had been confirmed for cities in Australia, Canada, New Zealand, the United Kingdom and United States, and as of June 19, 2006, there were 47 scheduled screenings. The project was referred to as "Serenity Now/Equality Now" on the official website, but was often referred to in shortened form as "Serenity Now", and was coordinated through "Can't Stop The Serenity". The name officially changed in 2007 to Can't Stop The Serenity (CSTS)

This has become a multi-venue event held each calendar year in various countries and cities and on various dates throughout the year. Funds raised by the events go to Equality Now (and other charities).

== Related works and merchandise ==
=== Comics ===
Universal Studios wanted to do an animated prequel to the Serenity film, but after Whedon and Brett Matthews wrote a story, Universal scuttled the project. The story was rewritten into a three-issue comic book miniseries intended to bridge the gap between the television series and the film. Serenity: Those Left Behind was released from July through September 2005 by Dark Horse Comics.

After Those Left Behind, other comics of the series were also published.

=== Books ===
A novelization of the film was written by Keith DeCandido and published by Simon & Schuster under their Pocket Star imprint on August 30, 2005. Titan Publishing published Serenity: The Official Visual Companion on September 1, 2005, and Titan Magazines released a one-shot souvenir magazine. Margaret Weis Productions released the Serenity tabletop role-playing game based on the film on September 19, 2005.

=== Trading card set and action figures ===
Inkworks issued a 72-card trading card set, including autographed cards and cards with swatches of costumes used in the film, on September 21, 2005. The set won Diamond Comics' 2005 Non-Sports Card Product of the Year Gem Award. Diamond Select Toys released five six-inch action figures initially featuring Malcolm Reynolds, Jayne Cobb, and a Reaver, later adding River Tam, Inara Serra, and Zoe Washburne. The line was deemed to be "disappointing" with the figure of Malcolm Reynolds particularly singled out; both won MWCToys' silver award for Worst Line and Worst Male Figure under twelve inches for 2005.

== Themes and cultural allusions ==
While the film depicts the Alliance as an all-powerful, authoritarian regime, Whedon states it is not so simple. "The Alliance isn't some evil empire", he explains but rather a largely benevolent bureaucratic force. The Alliance's main problem is that it seeks to govern everyone, regardless of whether they desire to belong to the central government or not. What the crew of Serenity represent—specifically Mal and his lifestyle—is the idea that people should have the right to make their own decisions, even if those decisions are bad.

The Operative embodies the Alliance and is, as Whedon describes, the "perfect product of what's wrong with the Alliance". He is someone whose motives are to achieve a good end, a "world without sin". The Operative believes so strongly in this idea that he willingly compromises his humanity in furtherance of it—as he admits, he would have no place in this world. Mal is, at the movie's beginning, a man who has lost all faith. By the end, Mal has finally come to believe so strongly in something—individual liberty—that he becomes willing to lay down his life to preserve it.

Whedon has said that the most important line spoken in the film is when Mal forces the Operative to watch the Miranda footage at the climax of the film, promising him "I'm going to show you a world without sin". Whedon makes the point that a world without sin is a world without choice and that choice is ultimately what defines humanity. According to Whedon, the planet "Miranda" was named for William Shakespeare's Miranda in The Tempest, who in Act V, scene I says: "O brave new world, / That has such people in't!" A spaceship found on the planet Miranda carries the code name "C57D", a reference to the flying saucer in the 1956 film Forbidden Planet. The plot to Forbidden Planet is based on The Tempest and like Serenity features a character struggling with his subconscious. The Alliance had hoped that Miranda would be a new kind of world, filled with peaceful, happy people and represents the "inane optimism of the Alliance".

The Fruity Oaty Bar commercial shown in the Maidenhead spaceport bar, which carried the subliminal message that triggered River Tam, is partially inspired by Mr. Sparkle, the mascot of a fictional brand of dish-washing detergent, who was featured in The Simpsons episode "In Marge We Trust". Whedon mentions in a DVD feature that when the Fruity Oaty Bar commercial was being designed, he constantly asked the animators to redesign it and make it even more bizarre than the previous design, until it arrived at the version presented on screen.

== Canceled sequel ==
Fans had hoped that if Serenity had been successful, it might lead to either a sequel or a film trilogy.

The first major sequel rumor began on December 1, 2005, when IGN Filmforce reported that Universal had expressed an interest in making a Serenity television movie for broadcast on the Sci-Fi Channel. It was expected that commissioning of a television sequel would be contingent on strong DVD sales of Serenity. In a January 2006 interview, Whedon doubted the chances of a sequel. On October 1, 2006, Whedon posted a comment to the Whedonesque.com website, debunking a rumor that he was working on a sequel.

In an interview at the 2007 Comic-Con, Whedon stated that he believes hope for a sequel rests in the sales of the Collector's Edition DVD. In an August 2007 interview with Amazon.com prior to the Collector's Edition DVD release, Whedon stated, "It's still on my mind, I mean, but I don't know if mine is the only mind that it's on." He later said, "You know, whether or not anybody who's involved would be available at that point—everybody's working, I'm happy to say—is a question, but whether I would want to do another one is not a question."
