= Shindig (Firefly) =

- Firefly episode
- Episode no.: Season 1 Episode 4
- Directed by: Vern Gillum
- Written by: Jane Espenson
- Production code: 1AGE03
- Original air date: November 1, 2002

Guest appearances
- Mark Sheppard as Badger; Edward Atterton as Atherton Wing; Larry Drake as Sir Warwick Harrow; Larry Pennell as Murphy

Episode chronology
← Previous "Bushwhacked"	Next → "Safe"

"Shindig" is the fourth produced episode of the science fiction television series Firefly created by Joss Whedon. It premiered as the show's sixth episode on November 1, 2002 on Fox.

Inara attends a formal society dance, only to find Malcolm there as well, attempting to set up a smuggling job. Mal comes to blows with Inara's conceited date and finds himself facing a duel with a renowned swordsman, and only one night to learn how to fence.

== Synopsis ==
The crew lands on Persephone for a day of shore leave. In her shuttle quarters, Inara scans potential clients and chooses local aristocrat Atherton Wing, a regular customer. Mal and Jayne are accosted by Badger, who needs Mal's help to move an illegal cargo for aristocrat Sir Warrick Harrow, who shuns Badger and refuses to speak to him. He provides Mal and Kaylee with tickets to a fancy ball that Inara will be attending.

At the ball, Atherton asks Inara to be his personal Companion, remaining in a world more suited to her, but she diplomatically defers making a final decision. Suddenly, the arrival of "Miss Kaywinnet Lee Frye and escort" is announced — Kaylee, in a ruffled dress she had earlier coveted in a shop window, accompanied by Mal in a fine suit. Back on Serenity, Simon, Book, and Jayne play cards, using ship chores as currency. River, experiencing another of her manic outbursts, frantically shreds the Blue Sun labels of their canned food supplies before Simon and Book calm her. Meanwhile, Wash and Zoe have sex.

At the ball, Kaylee's friendly attempt to mix with the debutantes fails, but she is rescued by an older gentleman, then draws in a group of several mechanically minded men fascinated by her knowledge of ships. Meanwhile, Mal finds Warrick, who is cool to any proposal that Badger is behind, despite Mal's professionalism. Just then, Atherton Wing, with Inara in tow, interrupts their conversation. Mal escorts Inara onto the dance floor, but when Atherton cuts in and insists on his right to take Inara away because "money changed hands", Mal punches him in the face, unknowingly making a challenge that commits him to a duel by sword against Atherton, a renowned fencer. Warrick agrees to be his second and Mal is put up in an expensive room by Atherton for the evening to ensure he won't try to escape.

On Serenity, Badger and his henchman arrive uninvited to explain to the remaining crew that Mal will be fighting Atherton for his life, with Badger admitting that his only interest is making sure the crew uphold their end of the deal should Mal be killed. As Mal ineptly practices for the duel, Inara sneaks into his room to talk; she is confused by Mal's decision to punch Atherton because he insulted her, when Mal often does this himself. Mal replies that he merely insults her profession, whereas Wing insulted her.

In the meantime, the crew of Serenity sits in the cargo hold, attempting to plot an escape from the watchful eyes of Badger and his cronies. Jayne comes up with the idea that they need a diversion to get Badger separated from his men. River appears and, in a display of her as-yet unrevealed talents, converses with Badger in his own accent, reveals his criminal history, and tricks him into thinking she was born on his home planet. River departs, leaving behind a confounded but amused Badger.

In the course of the duel, Atherton wounds Mal several times through his knowledge of swordplay and Mal's own incompetence, and when he has Mal at his mercy, turns at a plea from Inara, who offers to stay with him if he will only spare Mal's life. Mal uses his distraction to disarm Atherton, deliver a punch to the face, and throw his own broken sword blade at him, stabbing him in the shoulder. Mal stands over the wounded Wing, wielding his own sword, and Warrick insists that he deliver the final blow, lest Atherton be humiliated for life. Mal, however, shows mercy (after getting in two more pokes), saying that he has to be the "better man". As Inara helps Mal off the field, Atherton calls out to her, saying he will ruin her for rejecting him. Inara responds by informing him that he is now persona non grata in the Companion registry, implicitly ruining him. Entertained by Mal's trouncing of the conceited Wing, and impressed by his tenacity, Warrick agrees to send his cargo with Mal.

The as-yet-unbegun escape plan plotted by the Serenity crew is aborted by the return of Inara and Mal, who chases a pleased Badger off his ship. Kaylee quietly sits in her room, listening to classical music, and gazing with pride at her ballgown. Inara and Mal share a moment on the cargo bay landing, watching over their cargo from Harrow — a bay full of cattle.

== Production ==
The writer of this episode, Jane Espenson, revealed how she enjoyed writing this episode, as it gave her a chance to invent a card game, as well as write dialog in "Jane Austen style". The sword fight took place near a Disney-owned production facility and so the shots had to be framed to exclude the "Country Bear Jamboree" barn located in the background.

According to DVD commentary, the role of Badger was originally written to be played by Joss Whedon. Instead the role was given to Mark Sheppard.

The ballgown that Inara wears at the ball was actually made out of costume designer Shawna Trpcic's wedding dress. The T-shirt that Jayne wears during the episode contains the Chinese word yong (勇), which means "soldier" or more commonly "brave". This shirt also appears in the episodes "The Train Job", "Ariel", and "War Stories".

Edward Atterton previously appeared as an army captain in Sharpe's Honour, advising the title character before a similar duel.

== Guest cast ==
- Mark Sheppard as Badger, the crime boss located on Persephone
- Edward Atterton as Atherton Wing, a young nobleman who attends the ball with Inara and offers her a different life.
- Larry Drake as Sir Warwick Harrow, the nobleman on Persephone who hires Mal to shift his property.
- Larry Pennell as Murphy
