= Serenity: Leaves on the Wind =

2014 six-issue comic book miniseries

- Cover of the hardcover edition, collecting the series. Art by Dan Dos Santos

Publication information
- Publisher: Dark Horse Comics
- Schedule: Monthly
- Format: Limited series
- Genre: Science fiction
- Publication date: January 2014 - June 2014
- No. of issues: 6
- Main characters: Malcolm Reynolds; Zoe Washburne; Jayne Cobb; Kaylee Frye; Inara Serra; Simon Tam; River Tam

Creative team
- Written by: Zack Whedon
- Penciller: Georges Jeanty
- Inker: Karl Story
- Colorist: Laura Martin

Serenity: Leaves on the Wind is a 2014 six-issue comic book miniseries published by Dark Horse Comics, based on the 2002 science fiction television series Firefly, and the 2005 feature film into which it was adapted, Serenity.

It is the third comic book miniseries to be based on Firefly after the 2005 miniseries, Serenity: Those Left Behind and the 2008 miniseries, Serenity: Better Days. It is the first miniseries not written by Firefly creator Joss Whedon. His brother Zack Whedon writes all six issues. Buffy the Vampire Slayer Season Eight and Season Nine penciller, Georges Jeanty, is the penciller. The miniseries continues the story roughly 39 weeks after the events of the film. The first issue was published January 29, 2014, and the last issue was published June 25, 2014. Each issue is 32 pages long.

A hardcover volume collecting the entire series was published in November 2014.

Leaves on the Wind #1 won Diamond Comics Distributors's 2014 Gem Award for Licensed Comic of the Year. Comic nominees for the award are chosen based on sales performance and quality, and the winners are selected by comic book specialty retailers.

== Plot ==
=== Chronology ===
The overall chronology of Serenity – Leaves on the Wind is not specified. However, the events portrayed appear to take place at an unspecified time after the events of the film Serenity, as well as after the events portrayed in the related graphic novelizations Float Out and It's Never Easy.

=== Part 1 ===
The storyline opens with a heated television debate between influential pro-Alliance and pro-Independence members. Following the very public revelation of the atrocities committed on the remote planet Miranda, the Alliance attempt to contain the resulting political fallout and to suppress Anti-Alliance riots and protests. The Alliance has been forced onto the political defensive: their public stance is that those responsible for the Miranda Transmission are terrorists who must be brought to justice. Aboard an Alliance battle cruiser, ranking officials including the apparent senior official, Kalista, are aware that the crew of Serenity were responsible for broadcasting the transmission, and conspire to capture them via a network of informers and undercover Alliance agents.

A resurgent group of anti-Alliance rebels calling themselves the ‘New Resistance’ , headed by a young woman named Bea, resolve to group together under the leadership of Captain Malcolm ‘Mal’ Reynolds, and they formulate a plan to find him. Shortly after, Bea is approached by a man claiming to be able to contact Reynolds.

Aboard the Serenity, most of the crew members who survived the events portrayed in the film Serenity have taken temporary refuge in a remote sector of space. River Tam has retained her assigned role as Serenity's helmsman. Inara Serra has resolved to stay aboard the ship. Zoe Washburne is unsettled by the imminent birth of her child, and the romantic relationship between Simon Tam and Kaylee Frye continues. It is also revealed that, at some point in the recent past, Mal and Inara have both acknowledged their mutual attraction, and consummated their relationship. However, Jayne Cobb has left the ship to settle with his mother, in parts unknown.

The remaining crew are hungry and partly demoralized, having been forced to abandon their normal sources of income out of fear of capture. Further, the Alliance has punished Inara for collaborating with Mal (now a sought-after fugitive) by voiding her registration as a companion, effectively rendering her a societal outcast. Knowing the urgent need to refuel and replenish their dwindling supplies, Inara tries to persuade Mal to bring them out of hiding in order to find a job. Mal and Inara retire to their quarters, and make love.

Shortly after, Zoe's daughter Emma is born aboard Serenity. Simon informs Mal that Zoe suffered a haemorrhage during the birth, and that she may die if she does not receive hospital treatment. River sets course for a nearby hospital satellite that is providing service to an asteroid mining operation.

Jubal Early, the bounty hunter whom Mal supposedly left for dead at the end of the ‘Firefly’ episode ‘Objects In Space’, infiltrates the Alliance cruiser and confronts Kalista, proposing to claim an Alliance bounty in return for capturing Mal. Bea locates Jayne, promising him payment in return for helping to locate Mal.

=== Part 2 ===
Jubal Early and Kalista formulate a plan to capture Serenity. Bea becomes impatient at the protracted delay in finding Mal, and with Jayne's crudity.

The crew of Serenity hurry to get Zoe aboard the hospital satellite, while Inara emphasizes to Mal their status as hunted fugitives. A doctor informs Simon that Zoe can be saved, but will be in recovery for at least five days. The conundrum forces Mal to a decision to temporarily abandon Zoe, and stage a later rescue – knowing she will be detained by the Alliance upon leaving surgery.

Back aboard Serenity, Mal chastises himself for leaving Zoe to be captured. River proposes that the contents of her own memory be extracted and used against the Alliance as potential leverage in exchange for Zoe, knowing that the only method of ‘extracting’ her memory is to be placed in an induced coma.

Bea and Jayne track down and board Serenity. Bea asks Mal to lead the New Resistance. Mal refuses, accusing Bea of compromising his crew's safety and ordering Bea and Jayne to leave immediately. Having stowed away on Bea's vessel, Early murders her crew, stealthily boards Serenity and destroys Bea's vessel, thus trapping Bea and Jayne on board Serenity. Zoe wakes in an Alliance infirmary and is confronted by an Alliance Lieutenant, Rodgers, who presents her with an ultimatum: if Zoe does not reveal the whereabouts of Serenity, she will be sentenced to a prison camp on a remote planet.

On Serenity, Mal chastises Jayne, telling him his mercenary nature and lust for money are what have resulted in their safety being jeopardized, and that Jayne will have to leave the ship as soon as possible.

=== Part 3 ===
River, still in an induced coma, dreams of leaving for the Alliance Academy, meeting her damaged compatriots, being an unwilling subject of human experimentation and being rescued by Simon. Jubal Early disables Simon, but his assault is secretly witnessed by Kaylee.

Inara professes her need of, and unconditional love for 'All of' Mal, and tells him the time has come to distribute Serenity's emergency rations. Collecting the rations, Mal is ambushed and disabled by Early.

Meditating on the present hopelessness of her situation, Bea laments coming aboard Serenity. Jayne comforts Bea, telling her Mal is a man of principle who fights to defend his beliefs. Left alone by Jayne, Bea accidentally accosts Early and offers him tea, failing to recognise him as a saboteur. Early secures the Serenity but fails to account for Kaylee, who strikes him down with a pipe wrench, binds him and threatens to torture him.

Regaining consciousness, River reveals that she is not the sole subject of the Alliance's human enhancement programme. She urges Simon and the rest of the crew to find and free the remaining test subjects. Mal refuses, asserting that their exclusive goal is to rescue Zoe, but gradually changes his mind as Inara explains that a more honourable aim would be to achieve both goals.

Zoe is transported to an unnamed prison camp from which she resolves to escape as soon as possible. Her declaration amuses a fellow inmate, who asserts that ‘No one gets out of here’. Realising that it will be nearly impossible to find Zoe and free River's compatriots without help from a member of the Alliance, Mal finds and asks for help from the disgraced Alliance Operative whose life he spared.

=== Part 4 ===
Under the hostile stares of the entire crew of Serenity, the Operative comes aboard. As Serenity lifts off from the Operative's planet, Kaylee drops Jubal Early to an intended death from the trash-dump bay while the ship ascends to altitude.

With the help and co-operation of the Operative and Bea, and with the dual objective of freeing both River's compatriots and Zoe, Mal and the crew form a plan to obtain a less conspicuous shuttle and bypass Alliance security. Disturbed by the presence of the Operative on Serenity, Kaylee voices her concerns to Inara, who replies that despite anyone's sensibilities, using the Operative is the only way to ensure success - but assures Kaylee that neither she, nor Mal, have forgotten the Operative's role in their predicament.

At the prison camp, Zoe reasserts her intention to escape. She is told that the entire planet consists of desert, and that Alliance policy is to allow the prisoners to kill each other. Witnessing the random brutality around her, Zoe violently intervenes to stop a fistfight, earning the enmity of most of the prison colony.

With Serenity on the planet Sihnon, the crew and Bea travel to a New Resistance safehouse where Bea uses Mal to win co-operation. Using an Alliance shuttle, Mal, the crew and the Operative invade the Alliance Academy building, realising too late that the unguarded building is a trap. As the Operative engages in a standoff with Kalista's lieutenant, Denon, the crew reach the holding chamber where River's compatriots are being held, but the doctor in charge of the human enhancement programme activates one of the experimentation subjects. Able to read the subject's mind and deduce her intentions, River whispers to the crew to run for their lives.

=== Part 5 ===
The activated test subject attacks River and the crew of Serenity. She easily overpowers the crew, breaking Jayne's arm and dangerously wounding Mal, who tells Bea to make good her escape. Semi-conscious, Mal has a series of flashbacks, culminating in his speech to the members of the New Resistance on Sihnon. He manages to activate the emergency recall mechanism for the shuttle, then helps River subdue the test subject with a tranquillizer injection.

Continuing to mount a defence of those inside the Alliance Academy, the Operative is severely beaten by Denon, but manages to defeat and kill him. The Operative is joined by Bea, but Kalista appears, prompting the Operative to surrender. Kalista gives the Operative his choice of death. The Operative chooses the ‘honourable’ death of ritual suicide, but is interrupted by the arrival of a shipload of New Resistance Browncoats who attempt to kill the Alliance members present. Mal, River and Jayne emerge from the Academy, carrying the test subject as their unconscious captive. The Browncoats cease fighting, and escort the crew to their shuttle. Mal orders that the wounded Lieutenant Rodgers be detained and brought aboard.

The crew tend to the wounded Mal and Jayne, and the Alliance test subject is restrained. Lieutenant Rodgers informs Bea that the New Resistance has already fallen: the welcome but perplexing influx of money and resources that allowed the formation of the New Resistance had in fact been provided by the Alliance, with the goal of exposing and compromising all militant dissenters. Mal responds by promising Rodgers that if the crew of Serenity are harassed by the Alliance in future, he will respond with violence. Mal then informs the defiant Rodgers that he need not say out loud where Zoe is being held, as River is able to read his mind.

=== Part 6 ===
In the prison camp, Zoe has been fighting off potential assassins for some time. She is informed by her one-eyed compatriot that although she fights well, she will eventually be defeated by overwhelming numbers. Zoe responds that she expects her friends will come for her.

Able to invade the mind of the captive Lieutenant Rodgers, River correctly deduces which planet Zoe is being held on. She elaborates on the psychic and mental damage inflicted on the test subject the crew have rescued from the Alliance Academy, and Simon promises to try to help the subject regain her lost humanity. Mal and the crew initiate their plan to rescue Zoe, and Bea offers to help. Mal rejects her, but relents after Bea informs him that her father had fought under Mal's command during the Battle of Serenity Valley.

Back in the prison camp, Zoe hears Serenity enter the planet's atmosphere, and knows her rescue is imminent. The following morning, she breaks away from the prison group, but is pursued by guards. Assisted by Mal, Bea and the Operative using Serenity's Mule transport, and with Jayne acting as sniper from a nearby rock outcropping, she escapes, but the Mule is nearly swamped by prison guards determined to re-capture her. Reaching and taking off in Serenity, the crew abandon Lieutenant Rodgers on the surface of the prison planet. Landing on the planet Theophrastus, Mal parts company with the Operative, and watches him walk away. Wanting to claim vengeance for her dead husband Hoban Washburne, Zoe leaves Serenity without the crew's knowledge and challenges the Operative to a duel to the death. The outcome is not shown, but Zoe is later shown back on the ship. Mal asks her: ‘You all right?’ Her reply is: ‘Getting there, Sir’.

The rescued test subject reveals her name as Iris, and is welcomed aboard Serenity. She states her intent to remain free, and her desire to avenge herself on the Alliance – a plan welcomed by Bea. Mal offers Zoe a chance to settle down away from the chaos aboard Serenity and raise her daughter, but Zoe refuses, stating that the crew of Serenity are her daughter's family. Inara asks Mal what the next course of action is, and Mal responds typically, saying they will ‘Take to the sky; see where it leads’.

On the Operative's planet, an old woman informs Kalista that Jubal Early was found half-dead in the branches of a nearby tree. Taking him aboard an Alliance shuttle, Kalista informs the terribly wounded Early that he will be obliged to complete his assignment to locate Serenity, and adds that she will be providing ‘help’ – the remaining complement of Alliance human-experimentation subjects. The series concludes as Kalista mounts the bridge of her shuttle, removing her wig and displaying the cross-hatched scars on her scalp, revealing that she herself is one of the human-experimentation subjects as she expresses desire for River to join them as family.

== Publication dates ==
- Issue #1: January 29, 2014
- Issue #2: February 26, 2014
- Issue #3: March 26, 2014
- Issue #4: April 30, 2014
- Issue #5: May 28, 2014
- Issue #6: June 25, 2014
- Hardcover: November 5, 2014

== See also ==
- List of comics based on television programs
- List of comics based on films
