= Trash (Firefly) =

- Firefly episode
- Episode no.: Season 1 Episode 11
- Directed by: Vern Gillum
- Written by: Ben Edlund; Jose Molina
- Production code: 1AGE12
- Original air date: June 28, 2003 (Sci-Fi Channel)

Guest appearances
- Christina Hendricks as Bridget / Saffron / Yolanda Haymer; Franc Ross as Monty Reynolds; Dwier Brown as Durran Haymer

Episode chronology
| ← Previous "War Stories" | Next → "The Message" |

"Trash" is the eleventh episode of the science fiction television series Firefly created by Joss Whedon. It is the first of three episodes that were not broadcast in the original 2002 Fox run.

Mal's "wife" Saffron convinces him to help her steal a valuable artifact, but the crew of Serenity suspects foul play.

== Synopsis ==
The episode opens in a desert, where a naked Mal sits on a rock, staring into the distance and saying to himself: "Yeah… that went well."

During a cargo transfer seventy-two hours earlier, Mal meets up with Monty, a fellow ex-Browncoat turned smuggler. Surprised to see that Monty has shaved off his beard, Mal learns that he has married a woman named Bridget. Bridget turns out to be Mal's former "wife" Saffron, and a fight breaks out between them. Enraged to learn of Saffron's double-dealing, Monty and his crew throw her off their ship and depart. Mal draws his gun and orders Saffron to walk away, implying that he leaves her marooned even when she tempts him with the prospect of a lucrative heist. Later, Serenity arrives to pick up Mal and the cargo. After Inara criticizes Mal for only doing "petty thefts" instead of taking more lucrative jobs, he frees Saffron from the crate he had locked her in and agrees to the heist.

In the common room, Saffron describes to the crew her plan to steal a priceless antique laser pistol, the "Lassiter", from Durran Haymer, a wealthy collector of Earth-That-Was artifacts who obtained most of his collection during the Unification War. She claims a detailed knowledge of Durran's security arrangements and the layout of his estate on Bellerophon, but explains that the difficulty lies in sneaking the weapon out, something Serenity's crew could accomplish. The crew is outraged that Mal has brought Saffron on board, but they reluctantly agree to the plan. Inara, however, warns Zoe to keep an eye on Saffron (not knowing that Saffron is eavesdropping) before leaving Serenity to attend to her clients.

Jayne tells Simon and River that they will have to hide during the heist so Saffron won't try to turn them in. River worries about the situation, telling Simon she doesn't trust Saffron and that she knows Jayne had earlier tried to betray them to the Alliance. Meanwhile, Wash and Kaylee instruct Mal and Saffron to dump the collectible pistol, once they procure it, into an automated trash disposal unit, which Kaylee can reprogram to have the trash taken to a remote desert where they can pick it up safely.

Mal and Saffron slip into the estate dressed as workers. They find the pistol, but run into Durran himself. Durran rushes to Saffron and embraces her, calling her "Yolanda" and thanking Mal for bringing back his wife, who had apparently disappeared six years ago. Saffron gets him to leave, and Mal deduces that Durran is Saffron's original husband, explaining how she obtained the knowledge needed for the heist. Durran suddenly appears and reveals that he knows why Saffron is here, and has already alerted the authorities. While Mal dumps the pistol, Saffron knocks Durran out and the two manage to evade arrest and reach Mal's shuttle. Meanwhile, Kaylee and Jayne work to reprogram the trash unit, but Jayne is incapacitated by an electric shock, forcing Kaylee to finish the task instead. Jayne is dragged back on board by Shepherd Book, and turned over to Simon for treatment.

As Mal and Saffron head to Isis Canyon to pick up the loot, Mal continues to explore his theory that Durran was Saffron's true love, and that she only robbed him because she was desperate for money. Saffron seems to become emotional, but when Mal is off guard, she steals his gun, forces him to strip naked, and leaves him in the desert before flying off. While going through the trash pile, she is shocked to see Inara with the Lassiter holding a gun on her. Inara explains that Mal knew she would betray them, and so had a backup plan of his own in place. Saffron is locked inside the trash unit, the authorities already on their way to collect her.

On Serenity, the crew discovers that Saffron had sabotaged their engine, forcing them to delay meeting Mal so they can make repairs. Jayne awakens in the infirmary to find that Simon has medically paralyzed him after he suffered a spinal injury. Simon reveals his knowledge of Jayne's plan to sell out the Tams, but reminds him that they are both part of the same crew, and that he trusts Jayne never to sell them out again. River, however, warns Jayne that she can "kill him with her brain". The repaired Serenity picks up Mal and Inara, and Mal, still fully naked, congratulates his crew on a job well done as he closes the rear door behind him.

== Guest cast ==
- Christina Hendricks as Saffron
- Franc Ross as Monty
- Dwier Brown as Durran Haymer

== Continuity ==
- Saffron first appeared in "Our Mrs. Reynolds", an episode that occurred "about a half a year back" from this one.
- After Jayne stocks up Simon and River's cabin and leaves, River, in another paranormal instance, tells Simon that Jayne is afraid they'll know what he was attempting to do in "Ariel", two episodes past. Simon and River confront Jayne on the subject towards the end of the episode.

== Reception ==
- Won the SyFy Genre Awards: Best Special Guest/Television Christina Hendricks for "Trash", 2006
- Won the SyFy Genre Awards: Best Episode/Television "Trash", 2006

== Pop culture references ==
The planet where most of the action takes place is Bellerophon. Bellerophon is the name of a spacecraft in the classic film Forbidden Planet (1956), in the TV series Andromeda, and in the series Star Trek: Deep Space Nine.

The Lassiter might have taken its name from the 1984 caper film of the same name starring Tom Selleck.
