= The Message (Firefly) =

- Firefly episode
- The body of Private Tracey
- Episode no.: Season 1 Episode 12
- Directed by: Tim Minear
- Written by: Joss Whedon; Tim Minear
- Production code: 1AGE13
- Original air date: July 15, 2003 (Sci-Fi Channel)

Guest appearances
- Jonathan M. Woodward as Tracey Smith; Richard Burgi as Lieutenant Womack

Episode chronology
← Previous "Trash"	Next → "Heart of Gold"

"The Message" is the twelfth episode of the science fiction television series Firefly created by Joss Whedon. It was the fourteenth and final episode produced during the show's production, but was placed before "Heart of Gold" and "Objects in Space" on the home video releases. "The Message" was the second of three episodes along with "Trash" and "Heart of Gold", that were not broadcast in the original 2002 Fox run and later aired on the Sci-Fi Channel on July 15, 2003.

A former Independent soldier, who had served with Mal and Zoe in the Unification War, returns in a dramatic manner, with a vicious Alliance officer chasing after him for some unusual smuggled goods.

== Synopsis ==
The show opens on a space station, and a barker extolling an exhibit featuring "proof of alien life". Inside the exhibit, Simon and Kaylee stare at a tall, illuminated cylinder that holds a strange and apparently dead creature that is actually a mutated cow fetus. Simon uses this moment alone with the engineer to attempt to get closer to her, but when he mentions that the other women he knows are either married (Zoe), professional (Inara), or related to him (River), Kaylee leaves in a huff. As Kaylee departs, Zoe and Wash console Simon.

Back in the concourse, Inara tries to convince Mal to let her help fence the Lassiter they stole but Mal insists on keeping her out of that side of the business. He then checks in with the station postmaster, who passes two packages along with Serenity's mail. Jayne arrives to find that his mother has sent him a home-knitted cap, while the other shipped item is a huge crate addressed to Mal and Zoe. They open it to discover a dead body, the corpse of Private Tracey Smith (Jonathan M. Woodward).

Seven years earlier, at the Battle of Du-Khang, the young Private Tracey calmly prepares a meal behind cover, not knowing an Alliance soldier is sneaking up on him. Just as the latter is about to shoot, Zoe appears behind him and cuts his throat. While she lectures the boy about not giving away his position, Mal comes running in, firing his gun and screaming loudly. Tracey is injured when the Alliance fires on their position. Mal and Zoe grab Tracey and their shell-shocked lieutenant and bug out with the rest of their unit.

Back in the present, the two ex-soldiers puzzle over the "decently preserved" corpse of their former comrade. Hauling the box aboard Serenity, they find a recorded message from Tracey. He apparently anticipated trouble from some unsavory associates and has asked them to ship his body home to St. Albans, finishing the message with an old saying from the war, "When you can't run anymore, you crawl, and when you can't do that...well, yeah, you know the rest." Back on the station, two Alliance marshals and their commander, Lieutenant Womack (Richard Burgi), threaten the postmaster into telling them where to find Tracey's coffin.

Whilst Mal and Zoe describe their war-time experiences with Tracey to Inara, the ship is suddenly shaken by a warning shot from an Alliance craft. Womack hails them and demands to board Serenity. The crew at first think that Womack is after the Lassiter, but when Womack mentions "that crate", Mal realizes he's really after Tracey's box, and stalls for time while they take apart the crate to discover what secrets it might contain. Finding nothing, they decide to have Simon conduct an autopsy, but the doctors' first incision causes the "dead" man to leap up and attack him; it turns out he'd taken a drug that put him in a temporary coma.

After he calms down, Tracey confesses that he is smuggling illegally-grown internal organs. He was supposed to deliver the implanted organs to buyers on Ariel, but got a higher bid and betrayed his clients. Unfortunately for him, the original buyers killed his new customer and are now after their stolen "merchandise". After more warning shots, Mal and Wash steer Serenity onto St. Albans' surface trying to shake Womack, but are soon cornered. Book does some checking on their Alliance pursuers, and after thinking it over, he recommends to Mal that they allow Womack to board the ship. Tracey overhears some of this conversation and pulls a gun on the crew. An annoyed Mal orders Wash to call Womack. As Tracey fires at Wash, Zoe shoots him in the chest, injuring him. Tracey then tries to take Kaylee hostage, but the crew distracts him and Mal manages to shoot him a second time. Womack and his men enter the cargo bay only to be confronted by Book, who explains that Womack and his men are corrupt officers involved in criminal activity, and would not be missed if his friends killed them. Womack decides to depart, dismissing Tracey as "damaged goods".

Tracey belatedly realizes that Book's confrontation was part of a plan, one that his own impulsiveness ruined. Mortally wounded, he asks Mal and Zoe to really deliver him home this time; they agree, finishing the earlier saying, "When you can't crawl anymore, you find someone to carry you." Excerpts from Tracey's message can be heard as the crew of Serenity solemnly return the fallen soldier to his grieving family.

== Production notes ==
Production on "The Message" began on December 10, 2002. Due to low ratings, cast and crew went into filming fearing that the show was nearing cancellation. On December 12, Fox announced that it was canceling Firefly. Filming was allowed to continue for another week until Fox aired the final episode (which ultimately was the series' original two-part pilot "Serenity"). Whedon used this short period to also reshoot scenes for other unaired episodes, most notably "Heart of Gold".

The final scene, in which Serenity's crew return Tracey's body to his family, marking an end to the former soldier's journeys, therefore had an extra poignancy for them. Greg Edmonson, composer for the show, wrote the musical piece that is heard when Tracey is returned to his family not only as a farewell to Tracey, but as a farewell to the series itself.

Kaylee has expressed romantic interest in two men thus far — Simon and Tracey — who have threatened her life. Simon refused to treat her gunshot wound unless they protected River from the Alliance in "Serenity" (although Kaylee believed he was bluffing), and in this episode Tracey held her at gunpoint. Joss Whedon wryly observes in the DVD commentaries that threatening Kaylee became a formula for drama, one he admitted using in early Buffy episodes, in which he would put Willow in danger to win over the viewers.

In the DVD audio commentary for the episode, a joke is made at how the postmaster is apparently the only Jew in space; calling him a 'Space Jew', or 'Spajew' for short.

== Reception ==
"The Message" was nominated for a 2004 Hugo Award for Best Dramatic Presentation, Short Form.

== Guest cast ==
- Jonathan M. Woodward as Tracey
- Richard Burgi as Lt. Womack
- Al Pugliese as Amnon Duul
- Tod Nakamura as Fendris
- Craig Vincent as Skunk
- Morgan Rusler as Barker
