= Objects in Space =

- Firefly episode
- River holding the "object"
- Episode no.: Season 1 Episode 14
- Directed by: Joss Whedon
- Written by: Joss Whedon
- Production code: 1AGE11
- Original air date: December 13, 2002 (Fox)

Guest appearances
- Richard Brooks as Jubal Early

Episode chronology
← Previous "Heart of Gold"	Next → —

"Objects in Space" is the 14th episode of the science fiction television series Firefly. It was the 10th episode to premiere on Fox during the series' original broadcast and aired on Friday, December 13, 2002, one day after the network announced the show's cancellation.

Serenity encounters Jubal Early, a ruthless professional bounty hunter who will stop at nothing to retrieve River. But River, feeling unwelcome on the ship, takes a novel approach to escaping from the long arm of the Alliance.

The inspiration for this episode came from Tim Minear, who gave Whedon the idea by merely mentioning Boba Fett. Whedon expanded upon the suggestion and extrapolated it into the villain of this episode, the "preternaturally cool, nearly psychotic bounty hunter" Jubal Early. Whedon has said that if he were forced to pick one piece of work to represent his entire body of work, he would pick this episode.

River's and Early's tactile and spiritual connection with physical objects reflects an existential experience in Whedon's youth and his subsequent study of Jean-Paul Sartre's existential novel Nausea.

Despite being placed as the final episode on the home video releases, it was the tenth episode produced and was intended to take place before "Trash" and "The Message".

== Synopsis ==
As Serenity flies by a planet, River lies in bed. She arises and takes a walk through the ship's rooms and corridors, encountering her shipmates in varied conversations with each other.

Simon is relaxing with Kaylee in the common room, telling her an amusing anecdote about medical school. River suddenly "sees" them looking at her, with Simon telling her that he'd "be there right now", implying she is responsible for taking him away from his successful medical career. She then finds Jayne and Shepherd Book in the kitchen, where she "hears" Jayne repeat his confession to Mal about selling out the Tams on Ariel, and Book mutters an angry but cryptic statement hinting at his less wholesome past. River continues to wander the ship and is moved by the sound of ocean waves as Zoe and Wash passionately kiss on the nearby bridge. Above the cargo bay, as Mal and Inara discuss her impending departure, River sees their unspoken frustrations over their unrealized relationship.

Fleeing the intense emotions, River runs down to the unoccupied cargo bay, where she spots a tree branch and picks it up. Suddenly, the real world returns, and she finds that she is holding one of Jayne's pistols while the crew surrounds her in a panic. Mal takes the gun from her and discovers it is loaded with the safety off. He orders her not to touch a weapon ever again, and River runs off, crying.

Meanwhile, a small vessel silently hovers above Serenity. The crew discusses what to do with River. When Zoe muses whether River has ever handled a gun, Kaylee reluctantly tells everyone about her experience during their assault on Adelei Niska's skyplex, when River killed three men with her eyes closed. The crew begins to speculate that River may be a "reader", having psychic powers, and though Simon objects, they question whether she might be dangerous. Both River and a man in a red spacesuit listen in. Once the crew goes to sleep, the man boards Serenity. He runs into Mal, subdues him, and locks the crew in their cabins. He surprises Kaylee in the engine room, ties her up, and threatens to rape her unless she keeps quiet. When Book hears him moving downstairs, the man disables him with a blow to the head. Simon hears a noise and rises to check on his sister, only to be attacked by the stranger, who addresses him by name. The man, Jubal Early, reveals that he is a bounty hunter pursuing River. As he waxes poetic and shares his opinions about various topics, he tells Simon that Kaylee will suffer unless he helps him find his sister.

Simon and Early search the ship, and run into Inara; Early pistol-whips her when she tries to appeal to his emotional side. The two men eventually reach the bridge, and Early, impatient and annoyed, threatens to shoot Simon if River doesn't give herself up. River then responds over the ship's intercom, explaining that because no one wanted her on Serenity but she didn't want to leave, she "melted away" and merged with the ship itself. River contacts Kaylee, telling her to cut herself free. As River reveals dark secrets about Early's past, unnerving and distracting him, Kaylee frees the crew, and River tells Mal she has a plan to deal with their assailant.

Early becomes suspicious when River mentions "how shiny it looks", and realizes that she isn't part of Serenity, but rather broadcasting from his own ship. He suddenly becomes frantic and tries to bargain with her, but River reassures him that she's ready to surrender as she cares for her shipmates and thinks leaving them is for the best. Simon attacks Early, but the hunter shoots him in the leg and knocks him flat on his back before donning his helmet and exiting Serenity. Once he is free of the ship's artificial gravity, Mal suddenly appears and shoves him off the ship into the deep of space, while River puts Early's ship on a preprogrammed course to nowhere and happily returns to Mal.

Later, in the infirmary, Simon carefully guides Zoe and Wash as they treat his bullet wound. Inara walks away from Mal as he tries to examine her cut lip. In the cargo bay, Jayne mocks Book's failure to defeat Early, despite "all them years of priest trainin'", and Book implies that he fought Early and only succumbed after a prolonged fight. Their friendship restored, Kaylee and River play jacks while Kaylee relates a racy anecdote from her past. River picks up and examines the bouncing ball, with its swirling, multicolored surface, as she drops it on the floor. Early, quietly floating through space as his oxygen supply slowly runs out, mutters to himself "Well, here I am."

== Themes ==
In the DVD commentary Joss Whedon explains that this episode is intended to resolve the crew's tension regarding River, ending with their acceptance of her as a valuable member of the crew. Whedon struggled with various ideas of how to approach the script until Tim Minear gave him the idea of using a bounty hunter.

=== Existentialism ===
As Whedon discloses in the DVD commentary, much of the dialogue and imagery was inspired by Jean-Paul Sartre, especially his novel Nausea. In his essay We're All Just Floating in Space, Lyle Zynda analyzes this episode's interpretation of existential meaninglessness, arguing that both River and Early perceive physical objects as divorced from the meanings with which others imbue them. For example, when River picks up the gun, she sees it as a harmless branch—an object, as she says, that "doesn't mean what you think"—transformed by her perspective into a benign thing of beauty. Early likewise describes his gun as "pretty" with a pleasing weight (both features separate from its function) yet acknowledges that its design aids its intended use, which Whedon describes as "grotesque".

While moving through the ship, both River and Early seem to be acutely aware of and derive sensual pleasure from their environment, stroking the walls, conscious of the physicality of their surroundings. Whedon notes in the DVD commentary that one of the ways he illustrated this quality was to keep the camera focused on River's bare feet as she walked. Early, admiring specifics of the ship's design, significantly echoes the episode's title when he says, "People don't appreciate the substance of things. Objects in space." It is the "physical implication" of a world without morals, the moral implication of which was verbalized by another of Whedon's creations, Angel: "If nothing we do matters, then all that matters is what we do."

Zynda argues that ultimately, River and Early's ability to experience objects divorced from their common meanings allows them to imbue those objects with a value of their choosing. Whereas River chooses a perspective that brings joyful wonder, Early chooses to contemplate those same objects with despair.

Early enacts one of Sartre's central ideas, the concept of "bad faith", when he denies his responsibility for his actions by claiming he is not free to do otherwise. When River accuses him of hurting people, he counters, "It's part of the job." She replies, "It's why you took the job."
