= Heart of Gold (Firefly) =

- Firefly episode
- Mal confronts Burgess
- Episode no.: Season 1 Episode 13
- Directed by: Thomas J. Wright
- Written by: Brett Matthews
- Production code: 1AGE10
- Original air date: August 19, 2003 (Sci-Fi Channel)

Guest appearances
- Melinda Clarke as Nandi; Kimberly McCullough as Chari; Fredric Lehne as Rance Burgess; Tracy Leah Ryan as Petaline; Angie Hart as Lucy

Episode chronology
← Previous "The Message"	Next → "Objects in Space"

"Heart of Gold" is the 13th episode of the science fiction television series Firefly created by Joss Whedon. It is the last of three episodes that were not broadcast in the original 2002 Fox run.

A Companion-trained friend of Inara's who runs a brothel calls for help from Serenity when a local bigwig reveals his intentions to take his baby from the woman he impregnated.

== Synopsis ==
At a brothel in the middle of a barren land, a powerful landowner named Rance Burgess (Fredric Lehne), accompanied by thugs, approaches the madam, Nandi (Melinda Clarke), demanding to see a woman named Petaline (Tracy Leah Ryan). Nandi refuses to let him in, but Burgess' thugs drag out Petaline, who is heavily pregnant, so Burgess can extract a DNA sample. He vows to return if his test on the DNA proves the child to be his, threatening to cut it out of her if need be.

Aboard Serenity, Inara receives a distress call from Nandi, an old friend of hers. Inara goes to Mal and explains that Nandi and the prostitutes who work in her brothel are not Companions, and thus not protected by the Guild. After she relates their plight, Mal agrees to help them. Upon landing, Jayne takes one of the women to his room, Shepherd Book agrees to conduct a prayer reading, and Simon goes to examine Petaline, who is due to give birth soon. Mal gets to know Nandi, who explains that Burgess deliberately keeps the people poor so he can live out his Wild West fantasies.

Mal and Inara meet Burgess at the local theater, with Mal making polite conversation and even getting to hold Burgess' personal laser gun. After they leave, Burgess gets confirmation that the baby is his. Mal advises Nandi to close the brothel and evacuate her people off-planet, but Nandi refuses to leave her hard-earned property and way of life. Mal, impressed by her stubbornness, agrees to stay and fortify the ranch for Burgess' impending attack.

As the Serenity crew makes their preparations, Zoe has a tense conversation with Wash about whether they should have a child of their own. Petaline goes into labor, with Inara, Simon, and River beside her. That evening, Mal learns that Inara was skilled enough to potentially become a leader of the Companion's Guild, but instead chose to leave the comfort of the central planets to travel the galaxy. Nandi admits that she gave up on her Companion training because she found it too restricting, and that even though Inara was supposed to shun her per the Guild's rules, the two women have kept in touch regardless. Nandi and Mal sleep together. Back in town, one of Nandi's girls, Chari (Kimberly McCullough), secretly reveals Mal's plan to Burgess.

The next morning, Mal tries to explain his night with Nandi to Inara, but Inara calmly tells him that there is no reason to be embarrassed about his sex life, and also thanks him for comforting her friend. Nonetheless, Inara subsequently sobs deeply in private.

Burgess' men attack the ranch, and a battle ensues, with the Serenity crew leading the prostitutes to fight their attackers. On board Serenity, Wash and Kaylee find some of Burgess' men searching the ship and manage to outsmart and lock them in a hallway. As Petaline gives birth, Chari lets Burgess inside. He steals the baby, and shoots Nandi dead when she tries to stop him. Mal pursues him on horseback, and drags him back to the ranch, where Petaline shows him their son, Jonah, before killing him. The surviving men, as well as Chari, are ordered to walk back to town. Following a funeral for Nandi and the rest of the fallen, Serenity departs.

Back on the ship, Inara reiterates her gratitude that Mal was able to comfort Nandi on what turned out to be her last night, but Mal can only regret his failure to save her. As Mal tries to broach the subject of his and Inara's unacknowledged feelings towards each other, Inara muses about how the family Nandi made for herself isn't that different from what she has on Serenity. She then tells Mal that she intends to do something she should have done before - leave him and the ship.

== Reception ==
"Heart of Gold" was nominated for a 2004 Hugo Award for Best Dramatic Presentation, Short Form.

== Guest cast ==
- Melinda Clarke as Nandi
- Kimberly McCullough as Chari
- Fredric Lehne as Rance Burgess
- Tracy Ryan as Petaline
- Heather Black as Helen
- Angie Hart as Lucy
