= Safe (Firefly) =

- Firefly episode
- Episode no.: Season 1 Episode 5
- Directed by: Michael Grossman
- Written by: Drew Z. Greenberg
- Production code: 1AGE04
- Original air date: November 8, 2002

Guest appearances
- Isabella Hofmann as Regan Tam; William Converse-Roberts as Gabriel Tam; John Thaddeus as Stark; Gary Werntz as Patron; Skylar Roberge as Young River; Zac Efron as Young Simon; Erica Tazel as Doralee

Episode chronology
← Previous "Shindig"	Next → "Our Mrs. Reynolds"

"Safe" is the fifth produced episode of the science fiction television series Firefly created by Joss Whedon. It premiered as the show's seventh episode on November 8, 2002 on Fox.

Written by Drew Z. Greenberg, and directed by Michael Grossman, the episode originally aired on November 8, 2002. The episode sees Malcolm Reynolds forced to choose which crew members to save when one is gravely wounded and two others are kidnapped. Simon Tam finds an uneasy haven in a remote village, but River's uncanny perceptions jeopardize the Tams' temporary safety.

The episode is the television debut of actor Zac Efron, who appears in flashback as the young Simon Tam.

== Plot ==
The episode is interspersed with flashbacks, detailing Simon and River's lives before River's abduction: Simon studying to fulfill his family's expectations, River engaging in flights of imagination while correcting his textbooks, and their father encouraging Simon to become a "brilliant doctor". Simon's relationship with his parents begins to sour when River is sent to an elite but secretive academy. He does not hear from her for a while, then becomes concerned when she sends him a letter referring to events that never happened. Their parents are untroubled by River's letter, believing she is just playing games again, but Simon realizes it is a coded message asking for help. When he gets arrested for trespassing while trying to find River, his father bails him out, but warns him that he will be disowned if he gets in trouble again.

In the present day, Simon continues to try and diagnose River's condition, while Mal demands that they stay out of the way while he conducts business. Upon arriving at the backwater colony of Jiangyin, Shepherd Book aids Mal and Jayne in unloading and penning their cattle and meeting with the Grange brothers, their disreputable buyers. Just as they come to an agreement on price, the local marshals arrive to arrest the brothers for murder, and Book is seriously wounded in the ensuing gunfight.

Meanwhile, Simon and River join Inara and Kaylee in town as the women are shopping. Although Kaylee contemplates buying something nice for Simon, the doctor proceeds to insult her and her beloved Serenity with his complaints about their predicament, and the Tams are left to their own devices. Simon quickly discovers River has wandered off. She finds a maypole dance, and Simon watches his sister enjoy herself for a change. River's ecstatic dancing suddenly falters when Book is shot, but before Simon can react to his sister's distress, he is kidnapped by three shabbily-dressed men. River follows and is seized as well.

Mal and Zoe manage to get Book back to Serenity to stabilize him. When Wash is unable to find Simon to help Book, Mal realizes that Simon and River have probably been taken by local hill-folk, who are known to kidnap people, especially skilled workers, when they need their talents. He decides to abandon the Tams in order to seek urgently needed medical help off-planet for Book. On Inara's insistence, they dock with the Alliance cruiser Magellan; its captain refuses to help until Book tells them to check his identification card, at which point the captain orders immediate assistance. Mal and the rest of the crew wonder what kind of connections with the Alliance Book has to receive such treatment, but a recovering Book dodges Mal's questions, stating merely that "it's good to be home."

The hill folk initially welcome Simon and his sister, and Simon quickly takes up his new responsibilities as the town doctor. Doralee, the village teacher assigned to work as his nurse, merely suggests that Simon may well be in the place he is fated to be. Simon and River share a memory of their childhood, and River despairs of how her plight has cost Simon everything he worked for. When River tells Doralee about the cause of a young mute girl's silence, the devout woman believes her to be a witch and summons the town leader, who orders River to be burned alive when she reveals that he murdered his predecessor. Simon tries to talk the villagers down, but when these efforts fail, he instead chooses to stand beside her as the fire is lit. Serenity then swoops over the village, and with Jayne positioned above with a sniper rifle, Mal and Zoe force the villagers at gunpoint to release the Tams.

As Serenity leaves Jiangyin, Simon asks Mal why he came back for them, and Mal explains off-handedly that Simon is part of his crew. "But you don't even like me," Simon reminds him. "Why'd you do it?" "You're on my crew," Mal repeats. "Why are we still talking about this?"

== Guest cast ==
- Isabella Hofmann and William Converse-Roberts as Regan and Gabriel Tam, the mother and father of Simon and River Tam.
- John Thaddeus as Stark, the bandit who kidnaps Simon and River.
- Gary Werntz as Patron, the leader of the township the Tams are brought to.
- Zac Efron as young Simon Tam. This episode marks Efron's television debut.
- Skylar Roberge as young River Tam
- Erica Tazel as Doralee, the township's village teacher and informal doctor.

== Reception ==
The Nielsen ratings for the episode were 2.9/5. It was watched by 4.68 million viewers.
