= Daniel Bess =

American television and film actor

- Born: Daniel Luke Bess; October 8, 1977 (age 49); Honolulu, Hawaii, U.S.
- Occupation: Actor
- Years active: 1999–present
- Spouse: Linda Park (m. 2014–2022) Yvonne Sung (m. 2026)
- Children: 1

Daniel Luke Bess (born October 8, 1977) is an American television and film actor. Most known for playing Rick Allen on the first season of 24.

Bess was born in Honolulu, Hawaii and attended both high school and a school of the arts while living on the island. He graduated from SUNY Purchase Conservatory of Theater Arts with a bachelor of fine arts. He later acted in New York theater before moving to Los Angeles. His mother is a professor and his father (Benjamin "Buddy" Bess) is a publisher, who owns the Honolulu publishing company Bess Press. He also has a brother and a sister.

Bess married fellow actor Linda Park on October 11, 2014. They have a son together. On February 14, 2024, Park announced that they were no longer husband and wife and had been separated for over a year.

Bess married Yvonne Sung, a yoga and meditation teacher, in October 2026.

== Filmography ==
Year	Title	Role	Notes
1999	Law & Order: Special Victims Unit	Policeman	Episode: "Payback"
2001	Not Another Teen Movie	Panicked Student	Film
2001–2002	24	Rick Allen	18 episodes
2002	Firefly	Mudder	Episode: "Jaynestown"
2002	ER	Marshall	Episode: "First Snowfall"
2002	JAG	Marine Cpl. Joseph Tenny	Episode "All Ye Faithful"
2004	Veronica Mars	Cole (uncredited)	Episode: "Like a Virgin"
2005	Veronica Mars	Cole	Episode: "A Trip to the Dentist"
2005	Constellation	Young Bear	Film
2005	Medium	Young Man	Episode: "When Push Comes to Shove: Part 2"
2005	Grey's Anatomy	Pete Willoughby	Episode: "Bring the Pain"
2005	CSI: Crime Scene Investigation	Officer Bell	Episode: "A Bullet Runs Through It: Part 1"; Episode: "A Bullet Runs Through It: Part 2"
2005	Munich	American Athlete	Film
2006	What About Brian	Steve	Episode: "Pilot"; Episode: "Two in Twenty-Four"
2006	CSI: Miami	Chad Moore	Episode: "Shock"
2009	Get the Dime	Julius	Short film
2009	Numb3rs	Julien Curtis	Episode: "12:01 AM"
2011	Femme Fatales	Logan Cale	Episode: "The Clinic"
2012	Last Resort	Lt. Chris Cahill	Episodes: "Captain", "Voluntold", "Skeleton Crew", "Another Fine Navy Day", "Nuke It Out", "Cinderella Liberty", "Blue Water"
2013	Last Resort	Lt. Chris Cahill	Episodes: "Damn The Torpedoes", "Controlled Flight Into Terrain"
2013	The Glades	Rick Marsten	Episode: "Civil War"
2014	The Crazy Ones	Dylan	Episode: "Simon Roberts Was Here"
2014	Go-Go Boy Interrupted	Pat	Episode: "Birthday Black Out Surprise"
2015	iZombie	Matt Sudak	Episode: "Even Cowgirls Get the Black and Blues"
2015	Kittens in a Cage	Denny	Episodes: "Ain't Even Got a Mustache", "Have Another Muffin, Nancy"
2015	Scandal	Ronnie	Episode: "Put a Ring on It"
2016	Hawaii Five-0	Spencer	Episode: "Ka Luhi"
2017	Snatched	Front Desk Clerk	Film
2018	SEAL Team	Gordon	Episode: "The Cost of Doing Business"
2024	The Requiem Boogie	Mark	Film
