= War Stories (Firefly) =

- Firefly episode
- Episode no.: Season 1 Episode 10
- Directed by: James Contner
- Written by: Cheryl Cain
- Production code: 1AGE09
- Original air date: December 6, 2002

Guest appearances
- Michael Fairman as Adelai Niska; Katherine Kendall as The Councilor; Rolando Molina as Bolles; John Dunn as the torturer

Episode chronology
← Previous "Ariel"	Next → "Trash"

"War Stories" is the tenth episode of the science fiction television series Firefly created by Joss Whedon.

Angered at Zoe's unshakable war connection to Mal, Wash demands a shot at a field assignment. Unfortunately, crime lord Niska chooses this moment to exact a brutal vengeance for Mal's refusal to complete an earlier job.

"War Stories" originally aired on Fox on December 6, 2002 following a three-week hiatus. Fox instead aired the 1996 film Happy Gilmore in Firefly's time slot on November 22 and premiered the television film The Brady Bunch in the White House on November 29.

== Plot ==
On Serenity, as Simon reviews the data he collected on his sister, Shepherd Book looks over his shoulder, musing about a "warrior-poet" named Xiang Yu. Book cites one of Yu's quotes that suggests that the way to truly learn about someone is to torture them, and wonders if this was the purpose behind the brain surgery done on River. Simon disagrees, believing there was a specific goal the unknown surgeons were hoping to achieve. Elsewhere, crime lord Adelei Niska is torturing one of his men, also alluding to Xiang Yu. He is interrupted by a man who informed him that Mal's ship has been spotted nearby. Eager to take revenge on Mal for being the only man to ever cheat him on a deal, Niska orders that he be captured.

Back on Serenity, Kaylee playfully chases River around the cargo bay for an apple she stole, despite Jayne having contributed a crate's worth to the ship's stores. Once she takes hold of the apple, Kaylee claims that "no power in the 'verse can stop me." Amid the noise, Inara urges Mal to respect the privacy of her imminently arriving client, a local councilor of some political importance. Mal agrees to do so, as he prepares to depart on a "milk run" to sell off a shipment of stolen medicine.

Later, Zoe and Wash puzzle over Jayne's generosity as they eat the apples, Wash munching it, and Zoe slicing it with a knife. Kaylee asks why Zoe and Mal always cut up their apples, and Zoe tells a war story about the time Alliance troops gave their unit apples packed with hidden grenades that killed members of their platoon. Wash sardonically embellishes the story, visibly annoyed by the close friendship between Mal and his wife. Mal vetoes Wash's idea to improve their profit from the medicine sales by bypassing the local middlemen, then begins cutting his own apple. Wash is surprised by this, and is furious to discover that Zoe herself had agreed with Mal's decision. He angrily tells Zoe that there is no room for "two husbands" in their marriage.

As Mal prepares to leave, Wash purposefully sabotages his shuttle's controls, demanding the chance to accompany Mal instead of Zoe. Mal reluctantly agrees. In her quarters, Inara massages the councilor, while remarking that when she chooses her rare female clients, she does so because they are extraordinary in some way, and hints that the councilor's gift is allowing Inara herself to relax and serve her own needs as well as the councilor's. At the exchange, Mal's contacts are killed by a sniper team, and he and Wash are tied up and taken off-planet. Zoe, Book, and Jayne go to look for them, and quickly deduce from the evidence that Niska was responsible.

On Niska's skyplex, Mal and Wash are tortured with an electroshock device; Mal deliberately provokes Wash by discussing his marital problems in order to keep him from passing out. The crew pools all of their money and gives it to Zoe, who goes to see Niska and tries to buy Mal and Wash's freedom. Niska says there is only enough for one man, and Zoe chooses Wash, leaving Mal behind to be tortured to the brink of death. Zoe gets Wash back to Serenity, and organizes a rescue mission with the entire crew, except for Inara and River. As the others fight their way through the skyplex, Kaylee is cornered near the Serenity, too frightened to shoot back. River finds her, takes Kaylee's gun, closes her eyes, and kills all of her attackers without hesitation, scaring Kaylee.

Seeing his abductor distracted, Mal gets up effortlessly despite the hours of pain he's endured and proceeds to beat a terrified Niska before his torturer interferes, allowing the crime lord to escape. Zoe, Jayne, and Wash arrive and gun down Mal's attacker, saving his life. Back on the ship, Inara's former client provides Simon with the expensive medical technology needed to treat Mal's injuries. As Wash sits down to a bowl of "wife soup", Mal surprises him by declaring that he must sleep with Zoe to deal with any lingering sexual tension between them, causing Wash to abandon his meal so he can spend time with his wife. Back in the cargo hold, Kaylee stares at River with a look of fear on her face, no longer wanting to play with her.

== Continuity ==
- The opening scene, where Simon is prodding through River's brain scans and Book speaks of Simon's great heist, refers to the entirety of the previous episode, "Ariel". Before Niska intervenes, the crew is in the process of selling the stolen medicine from "Ariel".
- River's sharpshooting skill becomes a point of contention in the episode "Objects in Space" as well as the feature movie Serenity.
- Jayne's apparent generosity, buying a large amount of fresh fruit for the crew, is alluding to guilty feelings about his betrayal of Simon and River as well as Mal in the episode "Ariel".
