= Our Mrs. Reynolds =

- Firefly episode
- Episode no.: Season 1 Episode 6
- Directed by: Vondie Curtis Hall
- Written by: Joss Whedon
- Production code: 1AGE05
- Original air date: October 4, 2002

Guest appearances
- Christina Hendricks as Saffron; Benito Martinez as Corbin; Erik Passoja as Bree

Episode chronology
← Previous "Safe"	Next → "Jaynestown"

"Our Mrs. Reynolds" is the sixth episode of the science fiction television series Firefly created by Joss Whedon. It aired as the show's third episode on Friday, October 4, 2002 on Fox.

As an unexpected reward for an unpaid job, Mal finds himself married to a naïve, subservient young woman named Saffron (Christina Hendricks). Saffron is all too willing to play the role of housewife, which leads to an argument between Wash and Zoe and lectures from Shepherd Book, until Mal uncovers a more sinister reason for Saffron's devotion.

== Plot ==
A covered wagon makes its way through a shallow river. When bandits on horseback hold it up, the driver, Jayne, and his "wife" Mal pull their weapons on them. Mal offers them the choice of jail or death. In the ensuing shootout, Mal, Jayne and Zoe swiftly kill the bandits. The crew then celebrates at a party that evening, thrown in their honor by a rural settlement that had been plagued by the outlaws. Mal dances with a beautiful young woman, who gives him a wreath and a bowl of wine to drink, while the village elder gives Jayne a wooden rainstick.

After Serenity is underway again, Mal encounters a stowaway in the cargo bay: the young woman from the party, who gives her name as Saffron and informs him that she is his wife. Shepherd Book reads up on the local customs of Saffron's homeworld and informs Mal that he had inadvertently taken part in the local marriage ritual by accepting a wreath of flowers, drinking her wine, and dancing together. Mal has a heart-to-heart talk with Saffron, saying that he doesn't want to be married and urging her to be her own woman. Despite this, Saffron cooks him a meal and offers to wash his feet. Jayne attempts to trade his favorite gun, "Vera", for Saffron, but Mal turns him down.

When Mal enters his quarters later, Saffron manages to seduce and kiss him. However, her lips turn out to be coated with a narcotic which renders him unconscious. Saffron heads to the cockpit and tries her wiles on Wash. When she is unsuccessful, Saffron instead knocks him out with a kick to the back of the head. She quickly takes control of the ship, setting it on a new course and sabotaging the controls, then welding the door shut behind her as she leaves. Running to a shuttle to escape, she meets Inara and tries to seduce her too, but Zoe and Jayne find Wash unconscious and ring the ship's alarm. Inara compliments Saffron on her deception before the latter pushes her aside, hijacks the shuttle, and escapes. After Inara finds Mal unconscious, she is glad he's still alive and kisses him and calls the doctor to assist him, but then collapses next to his body when she's exposed to the same narcotic. The crew gathers in Mal's quarter where the doctor tells everyone about the narcotics on Mal's lips, Inara refuses to be examined since she pretended she stumbled and hit her head after she found Mal.

After breaking into the bridge, Kaylee and Wash are able to restore only the Serenity's navigational system. They are headed straight for a "net", operated by men who specialize in stripping vessels for parts or fixing them up. Book and Mal explain that the net can be used to electrocute everyone inside, making criminal operators' work easier. Meanwhile, Inara hypothesizes that Saffron had professional training as a companion. Mal has Jayne put Vera inside a space suit, then fire a bullet outside at a vulnerable portion of the net, disabling it. Jayne also shoots out the glass window of the operators' control unit, causing the two men to be asphyxiated by the vacuum of space.

Later, on a snow-covered planet, Mal bursts into Saffron's cabin and tells her, in no uncertain terms, that he will kill her if she ever tries to trick him again. Saffron admits that she respects Mal for not taking advantage of her like most of her previous marks, and before Mal leaves, he asks for her real name. Saffron hesitates, and Mal knocks her out cold before admitting to himself that she would have just lied again. Back on Serenity, Mal presses Inara for an explanation of her supposed dizziness. Inara thinks Mal knows about her kiss with him and agrees to "not play" with him, but Mal, with a grin on his face, says he thinks she just kissed Saffron before walking out, leaving Inara with a confused expression.

== Guest cast ==
- Christina Hendricks as Saffron, the newly Mrs Reynolds.
- Benito Martinez and Erik Passoja as Boss and Bree, the operators of the "net" that Serenity is steered toward.

== Deleted scene ==
River confounds the crew with one of her seeming whimsies, this time demanding that Book marry her and Simon. When Simon tries to explain that they can't get married because they are siblings, River gets very upset and questions his love for her. Mal and Saffron then come in and River accuses Saffron of being a thief, though River says she never saw Saffron stealing food. This indicates River's knowledge of Saffron's true nature, though at this point Saffron is still playing the subservient wife. After they leave, River takes a pillow from nearby and puts it in her dress at the stomach, stating that she and Simon have to get married now: "I'm in the family way."

Joss Whedon said on the DVD commentary that this was one of his, the cast's and the crew's favorite scenes, but they had to edit it out due to time constraints. Because this scene was cut, River has no lines in this episode.

== Production details ==
According to Jayne, "Vera" needs oxygen around her to fire; however, real-world gunpowder incorporates both fuel and oxidizer and will combust regardless of the presence or absence of atmosphere. According to the DVD commentary, the episode's producers checked this with a gun expert, but were incorrectly informed. It is possible that the limitation deals more with the action of the rifle, because some metals normally made to work in an atmosphere will vacuum weld together with no air present.(much more is needed for a vacuum weld to work. The two pieces have to be near perfectly flat - or in the exact shape of each other where the touch — and meticulously clean. The metal in a firearm would never be that clean nor matched up. There is always corrosion, lubricant, dust etc. The lack of oxidizer in the propellant is also not believable. Oxidizing agents are inexpensive and there is no way a propellant could adsorb enough oxygen, fast enough from the atmosphere to fire a projectile). It's also possible that the fictional, 26th century Vera used a propellant or particular ammunition type unlike any real-world 21st century gun, that does indeed require oxygen.

Vera herself is a rather extensively modified Saiga-12 semi-automatic shotgun.

The episode's title, "Our Mrs. Reynolds," is a play on the 1952 radio show, Our Miss Brooks.
