= List of Firefly (TV series) characters =

The main cast. Clockwise from upper left: Adam Baldwin as Jayne Cobb, Jewel Staite as Kaylee Frye, Alan Tudyk as Hoban "Wash" Washburne, Gina Torres as Zoe Washburne, Ron Glass as Derrial Book, Summer Glau as River Tam, Sean Maher as Simon Tam, Nathan Fillion as Malcolm Reynolds, and Morena Baccarin as Inara Serra

This page lists characters from the television series Firefly.

== Major characters ==
=== Malcolm Reynolds ===
Malcolm Reynolds ("Mal"), played by Nathan Fillion, is owner and captain of the Firefly-class spaceship Serenity, and was a volunteer in the war between the Alliance and the Independents (aka "Browncoats"). He got the name for his spaceship from a famous battle he fought and commanded in, the Battle of Serenity Valley. When asked why he named his ship after a lost battle, Zoe comments "Once you're in Serenity, you never leave. You just learn how to live there." He is fiercely loyal to those he calls his crew.

Malcolm's main mission is to keep his crew alive and to keep his ship flying. As Firefly writer Tim Minear stated in an interview: "It's just about getting by. That's always been the mission statement of what the show is—getting by." In "Serenity", Mal says of himself: "[If the] Wind blows northerly, I go North."

Screens from Serenity suggest that Mal was born on September 20, 2468—which would make him 49 at the time of the series Firefly—though, as the average human lifespan is 120, this would make him the equivalent of a man in his early 30s today. Mal was raised by his mother and "about 40 hands" on a ranch on the planet Shadow. Though Mal usually seems more practical than intellectual, he occasionally surprises his friends by displaying familiarity with disparate literature varying from the works of Xiang Yu to poems by Samuel Taylor Coleridge, though he has no idea "who" Mona Lisa is.

Mal volunteered for the Independents' army during the Unification War against the Alliance, gaining the rank of sergeant during that time. His loyal second-in-command Zoe was by his side for most of the war, surviving many dangerous conflicts with him. The show mentions three such battles, including the Battle of Du-Khang in 2510 (featured in "The Message") and a long winter campaign in New Kashmir (as told by Zoe in "War Stories") where he commanded a platoon. Mal was also involved in the ground campaign during the Battle of Sturges (as seen in the comic book Serenity: Those Left Behind), which according to Badger was the "bloodiest and shortest battle in all the war", although Mal considers it a distant second. Mal fought in many more battles, but the turning point for him and the Independents came with their physical and emotional defeat at the Battle of Serenity Valley on the planet Hera. On-screen information from the film Serenity suggests that Mal was given a brevet promotion to Captain during the Battle of Serenity Valley to take command of the ever-increasing number of Independent troops who were losing their officers at the hands of the Alliance. This might explain why, in one of the deleted scenes from the Firefly pilot, Mal is described as having commanded at least 2,000 men. On-screen information in Serenity shows him to have been attached to the 57th Overlanders Brigade; in the series pilot, Badger calls it the "Balls and Bayonets Brigade", though it is unclear whether that was a disparaging nickname coined by Badger himself or the actual unit sobriquet.

After the war Mal acquired his own ship, a derelict 03-K64 Firefly-class transport whose previous owner was a man named Captain Harbatkin (Mal never got around to changing the registration papers). Mal named the ship Serenity after the Battle of Serenity Valley, the decisive battle of the Unification War.

=== Zoë Washburne ===
Zoë Alleyne Washburne was portrayed by Gina Torres. Born February 15, 2484, "Vesselside" (given her statements to Wash during an argument in the episode "Heart of Gold", this is clearly an expression meaning "aboard a spaceship"), Zoë served in the Unification War under Sergeant Malcolm Reynolds and continues under his command on his spaceship, Serenity. She shares his belief in the corruption of the Alliance and wants freedom for the Border Planets. A loyal first mate and a tough, deadly fighter, Zoë is the only member of Mal's crew to regularly call him "sir", a vestige of their past as soldiers. She trusts Mal unconditionally, but has been known to disobey orders in serious situations when she disagrees with him.

Zoë married Serenity's pilot Wash sometime after he joined the crew, though initially she claimed that something about him "bothered" her. In the DVD commentary for the episode "Shindig", costume designer Shawna Trpcic mentions that the leather necklace Zoë always wears is a symbol of her marriage bond. However, she is seen wearing the necklace in the flashback sequences of "Out of Gas", well before she has married Wash. In the book Firefly: The Official Companion—Vol. 1, Torres speculates that the necklace is actually a shoelace from the boots that Zoë wore during the Unification War.

Although Zoë and Wash worked a very dangerous sort of lifestyle, they managed to retain a rather happy marriage with one another. Wash at times grows jealous of Zoë's close relationship with Mal. Zoë and Wash considered having children, but were unable to do so before Wash's death in Serenity. Zoë and the rest of the crew built a memorial for her husband on Mr. Universe's moon. As revealed in the comic Serenity: Float Out, Zoë was pregnant with Wash's daughter.

According to the book Serenity: The Official Visual Companion, Firefly series creator Joss Whedon writes that Zoë's last name was Alleyne (at least at the time of the Unification War), and she took the name Washburne after her marriage to Hoban Washburne. This is confirmed in a deleted scene from Serenity, in which a display lists her military name as Corporal Zoë Alleyne. In the documentary Re-Lighting the Firefly, her name is given as Zoë Warren, apparently a version of her name which was considered at one time, but changed by the time the film Serenity was released.

At the time of the Battle of Serenity Valley, Zoë had attained the rank of Corporal. She and Sergeant Malcolm Reynolds were the only survivors of their platoon in that battle.

The prop used as her weapon of choice, a Mare's Leg lever-action pistol, was originally used in the series The Adventures of Brisco County, Jr.

=== Hoban Washburne ===
Hoban "Wash" Washburne is played by Alan Tudyk. Wash serves as the pilot of Serenity, and is married to the ship's first mate, Zoe. He is only ever referred to as "Wash", the first syllable of his surname. When Mal confronts him in the Serenity film novelization, Wash's reasoning is "Why would anyone call themselves Hoban?" He grew up on a planet whose atmosphere is so polluted that no stars are visible, and became a pilot in part to see the sky beyond his home. A laid-back guy with a dry and occasionally laconic sense of humor, Wash tends to represent the pragmatic, cut-and-run opinion in any shipboard debate, and often serves as the calming influence in heated arguments. His actions sometimes appear cowardly, but Wash has proven his resolve and willingness to put himself in harm's way and do violence on behalf of his friends on many occasions.

Some of his backstory is given in the Serenity novelization. After Wash's friend Mr. Universe hacked the records and became top of the class before Wash, Mr. Universe silenced him by offering his services whenever they were needed. During the commentary on "War Stories", Tudyk states his belief that Wash served in the Unification War as a pilot, although he did not specify which side. Tudyk also jokes that Wash's ship was shot down after a single flight and he was put in a POW camp, where he spent the remainder of the war entertaining the other prisoners with shadow puppets. Later traveling widely, Wash's pilot skills and reputation grew so that he was actively courted by multiple captains when he met Malcolm Reynolds. Wash accepted Mal's offer and eventually fell in love with and married Reynolds' second-in-command, Zoe.

Wash dies near the end of the 2005 film Serenity when a harpoon launched by a Reaver ship impales him, killing him instantly. His last words are "I am a leaf on the wind, watch how I..." (the final word "soar" is cut off by his being impaled). His shipmates erect a memorial to him (it is unclear if this is a tomb as well) on Mr. Universe's moon. Mal Reynolds then takes up his duties as pilot of Serenity with River Tam as his new co-pilot. As a tribute to Wash, his collection of toy dinosaurs remains on the pilot's station of the bridge.

Whedon has said at least twice since the film's release that, had the series continued, Wash would not have been killed. When he reiterated this during the Firefly 10th anniversary reunion at the 2012 San Diego Comic-Con, Tudyk was apparently ecstatic.

=== Inara Serra ===
Inara Serra is played by Morena Baccarin. Born in the late 25th century on Sihnon, Inara is a Companion, a high-society courtesan licensed by the Union of Allied Planets (the "Alliance"). In Alliance society, Companions are part of the social elite, often accompanying the wealthy and powerful. Considerable ritual and ceremony surround their services, which appear to extend beyond sex to nurturing psychological, spiritual, physical, and emotional well-being. Companions do not view themselves as prostitutes and are insulted by the suggestion. Actress Rebecca Gayheart was initially hired to play the part of Inara, but was released after only one day of filming. Joss Whedon said that there was a lack of chemistry between her and the rest of the cast. Morena Baccarin filmed her first scene the very day she was accepted for the role.

As of the end of the original Firefly series, most of what is known about Companions is derived from Inara herself and incidental discussions with and about other Companions and Companion-trained individuals. These sources suggest that the extensive Companion training begins either in childhood or young adulthood and includes social and physical grace, self-defense, at least some performing arts, and psychology. The structure and rituals of Companion orders resemble those of religious orders, though it is unclear if there is a religious aspect. Comments made by Inara suggest that she is displeased with alterations to the traditional training she underwent, which is resulting in less experienced novices being introduced to certain aspects of the profession prematurely instead of when she feels they would be ready.

Companions choose their own customers, and to be chosen by one is considered a great honor and status symbol, as those chosen must be both wealthy enough to afford a Companion's often steep price, and desirable enough to attract one. Companions may choose to become the permanent Companion of someone should they desire, and can have ungracious customers blacklisted and banned from any Companionship at their discretion. Inara has a number of frequent clients throughout the Allied worlds, and takes both male and female clients, although most of her clients are male.

Inara, a Buddhist, was a rising member of Companion House Madrassa when she suddenly and inexplicably left to travel the outer rim. She has suggested that she "wanted to see the universe", although it is strongly hinted that she had other reasons. The events of the No Power in the 'Verse follow-up comic elaborate on this; while working in House Madrassa, Inara took on a high-ranking Independent commander as a client who revealed details of an imminent attack on Alliance interests. Disturbed by this, Inara broke the Companion Guild's strict confidentiality rules and reported what she had heard including the location of Fiddlers Green, a secret Independent military base. She was exiled from House Madrassa, with only her reputation keeping her from outright dismissal. Believing her actions to have been justified because she was saving innocent lives, Inara was horrified when the Alliance raided Fiddlers Green. The base was home to a large refugee population, but the Alliance did not discriminate during the raid, summarily executing everyone in one of the worst atrocities of the war.

Less than a year before the events of the pilot episode, Inara leased one of Serenity's shuttles for transportation, living space, and work space, providing her with some mobility. In exchange, her presence on the ship cuts through bureaucratic red tape and lends their operation an air of credibility. For this reason, Inara is nicknamed the "Ambassador" by the others on the ship. Though earning Mal's disfavor initially by stating that she supported unification of the Alliance and the Independents (in a flashback in "Out of Gas"), she and Mal have developed an unacknowledged attraction to each other which they resist, ostensibly for both business and personal reasons, which is expressed in the form of jesting and occasionally hurtful bickering. Mal constantly insults her career, but takes offense when others do so, going so far as to punch a client who did so. Mal tells Inara, "I may not respect your job, but he didn't respect you". In "Our Mrs. Reynolds", Inara fears that Mal has been murdered by Saffron; when she finds him only unconscious, she is so relieved that she kisses his lips. In "Heart of Gold", when Mal sleeps with former Companion Nandi, Inara acts outwardly pleased that Mal has honored her friend, but secretly breaks down in tears.

Inara is especially fond of Kaylee, taking a somewhat doting and sisterly role towards the optimistic mechanic. Inara also watches out for River when Simon needs support.

Inara appears to be at least somewhat adept at swordplay ("Shindig"). In the movie Serenity, it is shown that she also may have been trained somewhat in the martial arts, and is skilled with a bow and arrow, apparently preferring them over firearms. In a proposed extended version of a scene from Serenity, in Inara's Companion montage, she was to be seen teaching the girls how to use the bow, but this idea was dropped because she appeared too much like Wonder Woman.

A subplot for Inara was hinted at throughout the series. Joss Whedon explained in the DVD audio commentary for the pilot episode that the syringe Inara takes out during the Reaver encounter is not for suicide. Second, when the ship is disabled in the episode "Out of Gas", Simon said, "I don't want to die [on this ship]," and Inara replied, "I don't want to die at all." In "Heart of Gold", Nandi remarks that she did not age at all. The secret was apparently revealed in a panel at 2008's DragonCon; Morena Baccarin confirmed that Inara was dying of a terminal illness. This was later also confirmed in Firefly: Browncoats Unite, a Firefly 10th Anniversary Special aired on Science Channel in November 2012. In the same special, show writer Tim Minear explained Inara's mysterious syringe, saying that it contained a drug that would cause the death of her rapists in case she were to be raped. Minear also said that if the show had not been cancelled, a future episode might have involved Inara being abducted and raped by numerous Reavers, all of whom Mal found dead due to the effects of the drug.

Inara has been described as a postfeminist character.

=== Jayne Cobb ===
Jayne Cobb (played by Adam Baldwin) is a tall (6'4"), physically imposing mercenary who did not fight in the Unification War. Despite his comparatively brutish manner, Jayne regularly displays cunning and common sense. Adam Baldwin, when asked to describe the character, said "Sex. Muscle. Humor. Thuggery. Jayne." He also calls Jayne a "practical guy", explaining his character's use of gallows humor by explaining that when in peril, the choice is to "panic and cry and crap your pants, or you make a joke and you try to survive." Baldwin won the SyFy Genre Awards in 2006 for Best Supporting Actor/Television.

Though generally acting brutish and simple, occasionally he hints at a more complex and sensitive character. In the first episode, "Serenity", Jayne joins Shepherd Book in a silent grace. In "The Message", Jayne is revealed sending money earned by his mercenary activities home to his mother. His mother was using the money to care for a sick child named Mattie. In the same episode, he proudly sports an orange and yellow knit cap with earflaps and an orange pom-pom (a tuque), simply because his mother made it for him, to "keep him warm" as he traveled through space. Jayne thinks the hat is quite cunning, though his fellow shipmates gently mock him about it. Adam Baldwin auctioned the original hat from the show for the charity Marine Corps–Law Enforcement Foundation for US$4,707.57 and Fox asserts intellectual property rights in the burgeoning replica market.

In "Ariel", he shows shame for having sold out Simon and River and is noticeably disgusted upon hearing what the Alliance has done to River. In "The Message" he is noticeably upset while seeing a family receive their dead son and in "Jaynestown" when a young man saves his life by jumping in front of a shotgun blast meant for him. Jayne has shown a fear of anything to do with Reavers, a subpopulation of feral, cannibalistic humans. Jayne has demonstrated fear of dying in what he considers an unmanly fashion, notably being "spaced". In "Out of Gas" Jayne is seen on-screen curiously poking at Simon's birthday cake. In the commentaries for episodes "Out of Gas" and "War Stories", it is mentioned that Adam Baldwin added a "tactile" compulsion to the character. Jayne tends to touch, smell and taste things habitually, being constantly in touch with his surroundings.

Originally a member of a gang that ambushes Malcolm and Zoe, Jayne switches allegiances and joins them after Mal offers him a larger share of the take from heists and his own cabin. Though he engages in a few one-night stands, Jayne has no long-term love interest, beyond a lingering crush on Kaylee that Joss Whedon pointed out in the Serenity commentary. His feelings for her can be seen in his concern during the pilot episode, when he watched her surgery, as well as in his hostility towards Simon (Kaylee's obvious love-interest). Jayne is contemptuous of Simon and River, and sees them as a danger to his safety as they may bring the Alliance down on them.

Jayne keeps a large arsenal of weapons in his cabin on Serenity, the largest and most powerful being a firearm (specifically, a "Callahan full-bore auto-lock with a customized trigger, double cartridge and thorough gauge") nicknamed Vera, which he attempts to trade with Mal for his "wife" Saffron in "Our Mrs. Reynolds". Jayne frequently carries a handgun based on a LeMat Percussion Revolver nicknamed Boo, and in the movie Serenity, carries a machine gun named Lux. Jayne is regarded as something of a Robin Hood-like folk hero by the people of Canton on Higgins' Moon ("Jaynestown"), who have erected a statue of him in the center of the town and sing a song dedicated to "the hero of Canton, the man they call Jayne" ("The Ballad of Jayne Cobb") in which they tell how "he robbed from the rich and he gave to the poor". The true story is that Jayne double-crossed his partner Stitch Hessian and was forced to jettison the money in order to escape. Jayne eventually accepts the town's hospitality but seems to feel guilty that the people view his self-interested actions as heroic.

=== Kaylee Frye ===
Kaywinnet Lee "Kaylee" Frye was portrayed by Jewel Staite. Kaylee has exceptional mechanical aptitude, despite her lack of formal training, and serves as ship's mechanic on Serenity. Kaylee is sweet and chipper, the type who maintains a bright and positive attitude even when others are feeling low. Jewel Staite explains Kaylee's character as being wholesome, sweet, and "completely genuine in that sweetness", adding "She loves being on that ship. She loves all of those people. And she's the only one who loves all of them incredibly genuinely." Staite told Interview magazine, "She's kind of a floozy who wears her heart on her sleeve." Kaylee has shown an affinity for strawberries. Alongside her mechanical aptitude which allows Kaylee to fix just about anything, she has a desire for feminine things and is annoyed when Mal does not see that she is a woman as well as a mechanic. Although most notable in the episode "Shindig"—when he insulted her desire to purchase an elaborate dress on the grounds that she could only wear it in the engine room, making it as useful as "a sheep walkin' on its hind legs"—this recurs throughout the series.

The background of the character is revealed in the episode "Out of Gas", showing her joining the crew of Serenity. The ship's captain, Malcolm Reynolds, interrupted her and Bester, the ship's mechanic at the time, having sex in Serenity's engine room. However, when Bester incorrectly informed Mal that the ship could not be fixed, Kaylee quickly proved him wrong by diagnosing the problem and repairing the grounded Serenity virtually on the spot. Impressed with her mechanical ability, Mal immediately offered her Bester's job. Kaylee happily accepted, and left her family (and Bester) behind to join the crew.

When Kaylee first sees Simon Tam in the pilot episode, she is immediately enamoured with the well-dressed doctor. When she is later shot in the stomach by another passenger, Simon refuses to treat her injury unless he is allowed to remain on Serenity with his sister, River. Despite this, Kaylee finds herself further attracted to the doctor after he saves her. Jayne Cobb would embarrass her in this and later episodes by making fun of her attraction to Simon, usually right in front of Simon. The romantic attraction to Simon Tam remains unconsummated during the run of the series, even though it is clear that Simon bears strong feelings for her as well. (In the novelization of Serenity, River reveals that the attraction between Simon and Kaylee is not a simple crush or infatuation, but that the two are in fact, in love.) In the closing scene of the episode "Jaynestown", he states it is his 'proper' attitude that makes it difficult for him to express his feelings for her. The problem is compounded by the fact that he sometimes makes comments that hurt Kaylee's feelings, insulting the lifestyle of the crew, Serenity, and even herself, though he never intentionally means to insult her; a prominent example of his ineptitude at making conversation is in "The Message" when he described her as 'the only girl in the world', on the grounds that all the other women he knew were either married (Zoe), professional (Inara) or related to him (River). Simon himself almost never gets mad at Kaylee, the exception being "Objects in Space" when Kaylee revealed River's disturbing aptitude with a firearm, which placed a dark cloud over River in the eyes of the others.

In the movie Serenity, Simon Tam confesses his feelings for her, which she reciprocates. The ending depicts the two finally consummating their relationship.

At Dallas Sci Fi Expo, Jewel Staite said if the show had continued she would have liked to have seen Kaylee and Simon have a baby.

=== Simon Tam ===
Doctor Simon Tam, played by Sean Maher (and in a flashback by Zac Efron), appears in all episodes of Firefly, the feature film Serenity, and the Serenity comics.

Simon was born in late November, c. 2490 to Gabriel and Regan Tam, and was born and raised on Osiris, a Core World planet with major Alliance ties. In the original script for the episode "Bushwhacked" it is revealed that Simon supported Unification, the issue that sparked the eponymous War of Unification.

Since he was young, Simon's wealthy family had hopes for him to have a future in medicine. Simon was accepted to the best Medical Academy, or "MedAcad", on Osiris. Simon graduated in the top 3% of his class, and promptly moved onto a medical internship, which he completed in a mere eight months (as opposed to a year), and is licensed to practice medicine. From there, he became a resident trauma surgeon on one of the major hospitals in Capital City, Osiris.

Around this time, Simon's little sister River, whom he adores, attended an elite Alliance-sponsored school called The Academy. Eventually, Simon realized that River was writing to the family in code and began a quest to find and rescue her from the Academy. After learning about River's abuse at the Academy, he is unable to help her for two more years. However, Simon is eventually contacted by a group of men from an underground movement, and they help him with the rescue. Simon willingly gives up his career and is disinherited after becoming a fugitive in order to save his sister. While Simon and River head for Persephone, the Alliance freezes all of Simon's monetary accounts and labels Simon and River as fugitives.

After landing on Persephone Simon looks for a ship to take him and a cryogenically stabilized River off-planet. He chooses Serenity. The ship's mechanic, Kaylee Frye, is immediately infatuated with Simon. Later, the Serenity crew learn of the siblings' backstory. Because of the need of Simon and River to stay on the move, Mal Reynolds offers Simon a post as medic on Serenity, and Simon accepts. Simon soon settles into life on the ship, spending time with River, in attempts to figure out what happened to her at the Academy.

Simon's privileged background from the center planets of the Alliance puts him at odds with his rougher shipmates. He often comes across as stuffy or pretentious and is far more formal than the majority of the crew. Simon believes in having manners when no one is watching and his dedication to his sister is his main defining characteristic, often leading him to gladly make personal sacrifices for her benefit.

The Tams remain below Alliance radar, despite some close calls. There is also some tension with Jayne Cobb. After River attacks him with a knife during one of her psychotic outbursts, Jayne attempts to turn them in and collect the reward, although the plan backfires when he is double crossed by his Alliance contact. After an incident in "Safe" involving the absence of River, Simon is clearly more a part of the crew. In "Jaynestown", Simon and Kaylee have their first moment where it is realized that Simon may have more feelings for Kaylee than originally thought.

By "Objects in Space", the final episode, Simon has begun to loosen up much more, especially around Kaylee. This process is also underlined by a change in his costume: After the events in "Ariel" he dresses more casually, wearing pullovers instead of shirts and waistcoats.

In the film Serenity, Simon has finally become well adjusted to the crew—to the point where he even stands up to Mal and punches him when Mal puts River in danger during a heist. Near the end of the film, Simon admits to Kaylee that he would have liked to have had a romantic relationship with her just as they prepare for an apparently hopeless battle with Reavers and the two consummate their relationship in the end.

=== River Tam ===
River Tam, played by Summer Glau, first appears in Firefly and also appears in the R. Tam sessions, the comic Serenity: Those Left Behind, and the feature film Serenity. River is the teenage sister of Dr. Simon Tam, both of whom take refuge aboard Serenity. She was considered a prodigy from a very young age, intelligent beyond her years and athletically gifted. Simon stated that compared to her, he is an "idiot child", despite having graduated from medical school near the top of his class and finished his internship a full four months earlier than his classmates. Summer Glau won the Saturn Award for Best Supporting Actress for her role as River in Serenity in May 2006. Glau was also runner up for Best Actress/Movie in the SyFy Genre Awards for 2006.

River grew up with her brother Simon, with whom she was very close, as part of the wealthy Tam family on the "core" (Alliance-dominated) planet of Osiris. Having a high intellect and a ready grasp of complex subjects, she was sent to a government learning facility known only as "The Academy" at the age of fourteen. While her parents and Simon believed the Academy was a private school meant to nurture the gifts of the most academically talented children in the Alliance, it was in fact a cover for a government experiment in creating the perfect assassin. While in the hands of the Alliance doctors and scientists, River was secretly and extensively experimented on, including surgery that removed most of her amygdala, preventing River from being able to control her emotions. She has abrupt periods of mental instability and nurtures psychic and "intuitive" abilities, but although the R. Tam sessions imply that she may have already had some form of latent psychic abilities prior to being recruited, how and when this translated into her apparently full-fledged mind-reading abilities is unknown.

The Alliance isolates River from her family, though she managed to send a call for help by putting a coded message in a letter to her brother. Simon decoded the message and sets out to rescue his sister, despite his parents' insistence that he was simply being paranoid. He succeeds two years later. When the Alliance learns of River's rescue, they promptly freeze all of Simon's monetary accounts, leaving him with nothing but his medkit, and put out a warrant for the arrest of both Simon and River, labeling them as fugitives.

As evidenced in Serenity, River is extraordinarily skilled at hand-to-hand combat, and in one episode of Firefly, she fires three fatally accurate shots from a pistol after only a single quick glance into the battlefield (in both Firefly and Serenity, it is heavily implied that the Alliance was attempting to create a 'super-soldier'). On two separate occasions she ventures into large melees (20–30 opponents against her at the same time), and on both occasions she emerges not only victorious but (apparently) with only relatively minor injuries. The fighting style used by River in Serenity was a kung fu/kickboxing hybrid, modified to be more "balletic".

A young River is played by Skylar Roberge in "Safe", and by Hunter Ansley Wryn in Serenity.

=== Shepherd Derrial Book ===
Shepherd Derrial Book, played by Ron Glass, is a "shepherd", or preacher, who provides frequent spiritual advice and perspectives for the crew of Serenity. He has a mysterious past, and on numerous occasions has demonstrated a depth of knowledge in a number of fields incongruous with the clergy: including space travel, firearms, hand-to-hand combat, and criminal activity. Book's past appears to involve the Alliance in some way; he possesses an Alliance identity card that gives Book priority status for medical treatment on an Alliance ship, and in "The Message", he demonstrates knowledge of Alliance military procedures.

In "Serenity: The Shepherd's Tale", this character's mysterious backstory is revealed. Shepherd Book was born Henry Evans, running away from his abusive father at an early age. In his early adulthood, he was shown to have a criminal record and pending arrest warrants—and his penchant for violence was what caused the Independents to recruit him. Before the war even started, he infiltrated the Alliance military as Derrial Book—a name he stole from another cadet whom he jumped and killed. His rise through the ranks was meteoric, until he single-handedly masterminded the Alliance's greatest defeat—where in one military maneuver, the Alliance lost over 4,000 men. Instead of a trial and formal dismissal, he and the Alliance's devastating defeat were swept under the rug, and he was left to die on a random planet with no supplies. A few years later Book found God, joined the Abbey, and finally left, healed, to become a member of the crew of Serenity, where, in the end, he would find love and family.

Shepherd Book dies in the movie Serenity when Haven, the planet where he had been living, is attacked by Alliance forces on orders of the Operative. He took a few of them with him, using a flak gun to shoot down an Alliance assault craft; Mal finds him lying next to the gun, an irony not lost on the dying Shepherd.

== Minor characters ==
Minor characters are defined as any character who is not a part of the crew of the fictional ship Serenity including any who appear in the R. Tam sessions, the television show itself, the comic book series Serenity: Those Left Behind, or the film Serenity.

=== Badger ===
One of the crew's contacts on the moon-planet Persephone, Badger, a badger portrayed by Mark Sheppard, first appears in the pilot episode of the series, "Serenity". Badger, an "honest businessman" refuses to pay for cargo that he has commissioned the crew to retrieve after finding out it had the stamp of the Alliance forces. At the time, Badger threatened to provide information to the Alliance about Malcolm Reynolds and his salvage operation. Although Badger cannot be trusted, he apparently is consistent enough that Reynolds is willing to do business with him. Badger is clearly a criminal, but he views himself as a business man and "better than" Mal and other smugglers who do not have a base of operations.

Badger reappears in the episode "Shindig", and hires the crew again to collect some cargo (in truth a herd of cattle) from a "fancy reception" where he is unwelcome. In the comic book series Serenity: Those Left Behind, Badger sets events in motion by providing Reynolds with his initial contract. Badger speaks with a cockney accent, identified and imitated by River Tam. Joss Whedon mentions in the commentary on "Serenity" that he originally wrote the character with the intention of playing the role himself.

=== Bester ===
Bester was Serenity's original engine mechanic, portrayed by Dax Griffin. At some point before the events of Firefly (as shown in a flashback in "Out of Gas"), Malcolm Reynolds caught him having sex with a local girl, soon identified as Kaylee Frye, in the engine room. Mal demands to know what is taking Bester so long to fix the engine, and Kaylee then demonstrates that she has more knowledge of ship engine workings than Bester, whom Mal immediately fires in favor of Kaylee.

=== Sheriff Bourne ===
Sheriff Bourne is the sheriff of Paradiso, a mining town on Regina featured in "The Train Job", played by Gregg Henry. When Mal, Zoe, and Jayne rob the train between Hancock and Paradiso, Sheriff Bourne questions Mal and Zoe, who are pretending to be newlyweds, coming to Paradiso to find work in the mines. Bourne realizes there is something questionable about their story, but when Inara arrives claiming Mal as her escaped indentured servant, he thinks that is the problem. Later, as Mal was preparing to return the stolen medicine to Paradiso, Bourne and a posse track him down. However, he accepts that Mal has done the right thing by bringing the medicine back, and lets the crew go free.

=== Rance Burgess ===
Rance Burgess, played by Fredric Lehne in "Heart of Gold", is a rancher who runs afoul of the crew of Serenity when he decides to wage war against a brothel run by Nandi, a former Companion and friend of Inara Serra. According to Nandi, Burgess was the richest man on the planet, and kept everyone else poor so he could play at being "a cowboy in his own gorram theme park". Malcolm Reynolds and his crew lay out the defense of the Heart of Gold and defend the brothel when Burgess and his men attack to try and take the son he begat on one of the prostitutes, Petaline. Burgess loses the battle, attempts to escape, is captured by Mal, and is executed by Petaline herself.

=== Bridget ===
See Saffron

=== Dr. Caron ===
Dr. Caron, played by Sarah Paulson in the film Serenity, was a member of the rescue team that investigated the strange happenings on Miranda. Her recording of the event, noting the Alliance's inadvertent creation of what would become the Reavers, is pivotal in the film's climax. She, along with the rest of her team, is killed by the Reavers after their ship crashed.

=== Lawrence Dobson ===
Lawrence Dobson, played by Carlos Jacott, appears in the series pilot episode, Serenity. He is an undercover Alliance agent in pursuit of Simon and River Tam. When he suspects to have found Simon on the planet Persephone, he joins him and the Shepherd Derrial Book as a passenger on board Serenity.

Soon after leaving the planet he attempts to contact the Alliance to report his discovery. Wash detects this transmission and is able to scramble it. Wash informs Mal that someone has betrayed them. Believing Simon to be the traitor, Mal strikes him, only to realize Dobson is the spy when he is seen pointing a gun at Simon. During a moment of panic, Dobson shoots Kaylee and is knocked out by Book. He is locked up for a while, and when interrogated by Jayne, he attempts to bribe Jayne for his freedom.

By the time the ship arrives at the moon Whitefall, Dobson has escaped his quarters, assaulted Shepherd Book and attempted again, unsuccessfully, to contact the Alliance. He reveals a more sadistic side of himself as he beats Book unnecessarily in a fit of anger having already knocked Book unconscious. Up to this point, Book had been protecting him, mainly from Jayne. Dobson then finds River and tries to leave the ship while holding her at gunpoint. Malcolm Reynolds, returning from his mission, sizes up the situation and without hesitation shoots Dobson in the head. Mal and Jayne then toss him from the ship, leaving him for dead.

Joss Whedon intended for Dobson to survive the shooting and return for vengeance. The series was cancelled before this could occur, but the idea continued as a key part of the plot in the three-issue comic book miniseries Serenity: Those Left Behind, which takes place between the TV series and the film Serenity. In the comics, Dobson is still alive, his right eye (destroyed by Mal's bullet) replaced by a prosthesis. Obsessed with seeking revenge on Reynolds, Dobson joins the "Blue Gloves" in the search to find Serenity, its captain and the Tam siblings. When the two finally meet again, Mal shoots the former agent first (in his good eye), and kills him for good. However, before he leaves, Mal shoots Dobson again, "just to make sure".

In the pilot Firefly episode called "Serenity", Lawrence Dobson's initial clumsiness and common appearance contrasts him to the viewer (and the other characters) with the more suspicious-looking Simon Tam, to conceal Dobson's role as villain on the ship. This is an effect shared by other Joss Whedon characters portrayed by Jacott, where he also switches from seeming innocent, clumsy, and unimportant to being someone with more malicious intentions.

=== Jubal Early ===
Jubal Early is a bounty hunter who appears in the final episode "Objects in Space". Early, played by Richard Brooks, boards Serenity with the intention to kidnap River Tam in return for a bounty. Joss Whedon's DVD commentary for this episode reveals that Early was partly inspired by the Star Wars character Boba Fett.

Early is athletic and is clearly adept at unarmed combat. He is also intelligent and eccentric, given to rambling on philosophic matters in the middle of tense situations. When River is on his ship, she is able to deduce that he is/was a sadist, who tortured his neighbors' pets, and that his mother's dog never took a liking to him because of this. She also sensed that his mother was relieved to see him leave home, as she sensed a darkness in him. He also threatened to rape Kaylee if she did not do as he told her, and used the same threat of raping Kaylee when he dealt with Simon. At the end of "Objects in Space", Mal leaves him floating through space. Early has the distinction of uttering the last lines in the Firefly television series as he floats through space: "Well... here I am." Early's fate is unknown, but, when questioned by Inara, Mal stated that his chances for survival were "One in... a very large number" with the oxygen he had remaining. In an interview, Joss Whedon stated that Early definitely survived the encounter, and that he "loves that character". He later appears in the Leaves on the Wind comics title, which began release in January 2014 and is set after the Serenity film.

=== Fanty and Mingo ===
Fanty and Mingo are twin brothers who appear in the Serenity comic as well as the film. They are seen as fences for goods acquired by Mal Reynolds and the crew of Serenity. Although identical twins, Mal is able to tell the two of them apart (he claims "Fanty's prettier"). Their full names are Mingojerry and Fantastic Rample. The novelization states that they were named at birth by their mother. Mingojerry is a mis-remembered name, Mungojerrie from Old Possum's Book of Practical Cats by T. S. Eliot, and Fantastic is what she said when she realized that she was carrying twins. Said as an interjection, it was said as, "Fantastic, I've got to give birth again?!"

The twins are portrayed in the film by actual twin brothers Yan and Rafael Feldman.

=== Blue Gloves ===
The "Blue Gloves" are a pair of mysterious men, portrayed by Dennis Cockrum and Jeff Ricketts, who wear suits and what appear to be blue gloves. In the comic book miniseries Serenity: Those Left Behind, the blue "gloves" are shown to extend to and cover the upper body as well. They work for the Blue Sun Corporation, a contractor to the Alliance, and are in pursuit of River and Simon Tam. Jayne can be seen wearing a Blue Sun T-shirt throughout the episode "Bushwhacked", as well as in the episode "Ariel" when River slashes him across the logo, saying he "looks better in red".

They will not hesitate to kill anyone who has had contact with River, even Alliance personnel, using a handheld device that induces fatal hemorrhaging to anyone near it (except themselves).

The pair are never officially named in either Firefly or Serenity. In the DVD commentary for the episode "The Train Job", Joss Whedon refers to them as "the men with blue hands" and "the blue-hands men". The scripts refer to them as "Blue Gloves". River refers to the pair with the litany "two by two, hands of blue".

In Serenity: Those Left Behind, the duo are referred to as "independent contractors", and are killed when Serenity's thrust incinerates their ship. The Alliance then passes the assignment to retrieve the Tams to the Operative.

=== Sir Warwick Harrow ===
Sir Warwick Harrow, played by Larry Drake in "Shindig", is a nobleman on Persephone who owns some "property" that he needs moved off-planet. After he refuses to deal with Badger, Badger sends Malcolm Reynolds to talk to him. Harrow then serves as Reynolds' second when Reynolds inadvertently challenges Atherton Wing to a duel after Atherton insulted Inara. The manner in which Reynolds handles himself in the time leading up to and during the duel convinces Harrow of Mal's character and he decides to trust him with his "property", finally revealed to be a herd of cattle.

=== Stitch Hessian ===
Stitch Hessian was a former comrade of Jayne Cobb. The pair carried off a heist on Higgins' Moon, but when their craft was hit by anti-aircraft fire while escaping, Jayne pushed Stitch overboard. Stitch claims that he would never have done that to Jayne.

Stitch was captured by Boss Higgins's men and put into solitary confinement for four years until he is released by Higgins when the crew of Serenity land on Higgins' Moon in "Jaynestown". He then confronts and tries to kill Jayne in revenge, revealing the truth about the heist to the people of Higgins' Moon, who believe Jayne had dropped the money out of benevolent rather than selfish motives. He tries to shoot and kill Jayne, but an unidentified hero-worshipping boy of Higgins' Moon leaps in front of Jayne and takes the shotgun blast, giving Jayne an opening to throw a knife into Stitch's chest. The two fight and Jayne smashes his head into the plinth of his statue, killing him. He is portrayed by Kevin Gage.

=== Fess Higgins ===
Fess Higgins is the formerly virgin son of the magistrate of Higgins' Moon. His father, known only as Magistrate Higgins or Boss Higgins, contracts with Inara Serra for her to usher Fess into manhood. Inara talks Fess through some of his insecurities with his father and makes him look upon himself as his own man. As a result, Fess is able to stand up to his father when Boss Higgins tries to stop Serenity from leaving Higgins Moon with Jayne Cobb on board at the end of "Jaynestown". Fess Higgins is portrayed by Zachary Kranzler.

=== Magistrate Higgins ===
Magistrate Higgins is the final word of law on Higgins' Moon, a small moon that has a primary export of mud used to make ceramics. Higgins is a man who looks out only for himself. He treats his workers, known as mudders, harshly, almost as slaves, and metes out strict punishment to any who cross him, as evidenced by the confinement cage in which he imprisons Stitch Hessian after he and Jayne Cobb robbed him. Concern over his son Fess's virginity causes him to hire Inara Serra to turn Fess into a 'man', but the attempt is more successful than he'd expected; Fess openly defies his father and allows Serenity to lift off. Boss Higgins is portrayed by Gregory Itzin.

=== "The Interviewer" ===
"The Interviewer" is a man at the Academy who interviews River Tam in the R. Tam sessions. He is killed when River stabs him in the neck with his pen. He is portrayed by Joss Whedon. His face is never shown.

=== Lenore ===
Introduced in the film Serenity, Lenore is Mr. Universe's LoveBot and wife. As he dies, she is used to record a warning message for Mal. She is portrayed by Nectar Rose.

=== Dr. Mathias ===
Dr. Mathias is the doctor who headed the research project which resulted in River Tam's psychosis and increased abilities. He is very proud of his achievements and the importance it brought to him. Mathias is present when Simon Tam manages to free River from the medical center. Following questioning by the Operative about River's escape, the Operative kills Mathias for his failure. Dr. Mathias is portrayed by Michael Hitchcock.

Mathias is mentioned in the R. Tam sessions, and is seen, but not named, in the film Serenity, although he is named in the shooting script and novelization.

=== Mr. Universe ===
Mr. Universe is a reclusive techno-geek in the movie Serenity portrayed by David Krumholtz. He lives on a moon with his Gynoid wife, Lenore (portrayed by Nectar Rose). He has a great affinity for data and is capable of intercepting nearly any transmission or signal in the system. He boasts, "There's the truth of the signal. Everything goes somewhere, and I go everywhere."

He is seen stepping on a cloth-wrapped glass while wearing a yarmulka in a video clip of his wedding, implying that he is Jewish (or a member of a Judaism-influenced religion), and making him the second potential Jew seen within the Firefly universe; the other being Amnon the postman (the episode "The Message" clearly shows him wearing a kippah and tzitzit). In the novelization for the movie Serenity, he is alleged to have been a student at the same flight school as Wash, achieving the highest possible grades by manipulating the school's software, and providing Wash with information in exchange for Wash keeping quiet about what he did.

He is killed by the Operative, but set plans in motion for Malcolm Reynolds to broadcast a report from Dr. Caron that reveals the origins of the Reavers, leaving the message with his Gynoid bride before he dies.

=== Monty ===
Monty is a long-time colleague of Mal Reynolds who also fought on the side of the Independents in the Unification War. An extremely large (Zoe refers to him as a "sasquatch") and mostly genial man, he is known among his friends for wearing a thick beard and mustache. However, he shaved off his beard for his wife, Bridget, who turns out to be the con woman Saffron. Monty is portrayed by Franc Ross in the episode "Trash". Monty apparently has a formidable reputation as a brawler; when Kaylee asks if Mal got into a fight with him (due to wounds from his scuffle with Saffron/Bridget), Zoe notes that if he had, the crew would be down in the dirt picking up Mal's teeth.

=== Nandi ===
Nandi, played by Melinda Clarke in "Heart of Gold", is a former Companion who knew Inara on Sihnon before they both left the planet. Nandi gave up her life as a Companion—having concluded that it was too restrictive—to become a brothel madam, overseeing common prostitutes on one of the outer planets. When Petaline, one of her girls, becomes pregnant with the son of a local landowner, the richest, most powerful man on the small planet, she calls Inara to see if the crew of Serenity can help against the baby's father, Rance Burgess. Nandi and Mal share a one-night stand, which upsets Inara deeply, before Nandi is killed during a gunfight with Burgess and his men, and Petaline takes over the brothel.

=== Adelei Niska ===
Adelei Niska is a major crime lord of the Firefly universe, played by Michael Fairman and first seen in "The Train Job". Thoroughly ruthless in his business practices, he is dedicated to maintaining his reputation for exacting terrible reprisals on those who cross him—a reputation well deserved, as Malcolm Reynolds and Wash discover in "War Stories". In that episode, he espouses admiration for the brutal philosophy of a fictional Chinese dictator (the 'volcano' quote is sometimes attributed to Xiang Yu, but neither he nor any other Chinese warlords had ever written such a poem). In his first appearance, he hired Serenity to steal medicines being sent to a town where they were badly needed, but when Mal and Zoe learned what they'd done, Mal sent the medicine back to the town and returned Niska's money to his henchmen. Refusing to allow this slur on his reputation to pass, Niska returned to capture and torture Mal and Wash in revenge, only releasing Wash after Zoe paid him ransom money. (However, he claimed that she'd given him slightly too much, and so cut off Mal's left ear and gives it to her as a 'small refund'.) As a result, the entire crew of Serenity invades his satellite headquarters, allowing Mal to break free and forcing Niska to flee.

Throughout both episodes in which he appears ("The Train Job" and "War Stories"), the instrument associated with him in the soundtrack (i. e., providing his leitmotif) is the duduk.

=== The Operative ===
Introduced at the end of the comic book miniseries Serenity: Those Left Behind, the Operative is the principal antagonist of the film Serenity, in which he is portrayed by Chiwetel Ejiofor.

The Operative is an agent of the Alliance government; he works directly for its parliament. Similar to a black ops agent, the Operative does work that is not specifically acknowledged by the government. He has no name or official rank; however, he has free access to the Alliance facility where River was being studied, as well as deference from its highest-ranking scientists.

The Operative believes his missions will "make the world a better place" and ultimately create "a world without sin"; he believes these ends justify means he admits are evil. He freely kills as part of his job, murdering several people personally and ordering other attacks that kill Derrial Book and others. He is courteous in all his dealings and is shown to be distressed only when confronted by Reaver attack.

Highly proficient at hand-to-hand combat and firearms, the Operative prefers to use a sword, which he sees as more civilized and classic method of killing. He often tries to paralyze his targets by taking out a nerve cluster near the waist, and then stabs them; on some occasions, he has his enemies fall forward onto his sword, much like disgraced Roman generals used to do.

In Serenity, the Operative is ordered to retrieve River, bringing him into conflict with Mal and his crew, who have discovered the reason why the Alliance wants her back. In the film's climax, the Operative fights Mal atop a large suspended computer terminal. Mal emerges victorious from the fight thanks to an old war wound that caused the nerve cluster the Operative normally attacks to have been moved. He then causes the Operative to doubt his mission by forcing him to watch a report by Dr. Caron, revealing that the Alliance itself was responsible for accidentally creating the Reavers in the course of mass mind control experiments on the planet Miranda. When Mal broadcasts this secret to the universe, the Operative admits defeat and decides to leave the Alliance, calling off the search for River and helping the crew piece Serenity back together after the damage sustained in the crash. In a deleted scene, he asks Mal how he went on after the Battle of Serenity Valley, where he lost everything, but Mal simply tells him that the Operative would need to learn that for himself, muttering to himself loudly, "What a whiner".

=== Ott ===
Introduced in Those Left Behind, Ott and his gang steal the "coin" (a large sum of money) from Mal and crew in the town of Constance. There are Chinese characters tattooed along the right side of his face, and his personality is depicted as very greedy (he even tries to take Mal's gun from the war).

=== Patience ===
Patience, an elderly woman, is the leader of the backwater moon Whitefall and notorious in the backstory of the crew of Serenity for having previously shot Mal due to what he describes as a "perfectly legitimate conflict of interests". Mal nonetheless takes the crew to her in order to shift some troubling cargo in the pilot episode, "Serenity". Despite her treachery, they successfully sell the cargo. She is portrayed by Bonnie Bartlett.

=== Saffron ===
"Saffron" is one of several known aliases of a character played by Christina Hendricks. She is a very crafty and amoral con artist who assumes convenient identities to commit grand thefts. She is also known to seduce—and frequently marry—her marks.

Malcolm Reynolds and the crew of Serenity encountered her twice.

In "Our Mrs. Reynolds", Mal finds himself married to her in an obscure native ceremony, as she pretends to be a demure, compliant girl trained to be a subservient wife. Saffron overtakes the crew with stealth and guile and sends the ship off to be scrapped by pirates, but they manage to escape.

In "Trash", she convinces Mal to steal a priceless antique laser pistol owned by a man who turns out to be another husband of hers. She manages to steal the artifact from them, but the crew were secretly playing her from the beginning and take the artifact back for themselves.

When last seen, Saffron is trapped in a trash bin by Inara, awaiting release by the authorities who are en route to her location.

Saffron's real name is unknown to the Serenity crew. She poses as "Bridget" for Mal's smuggler friend Monty, and as "Yolanda" to Durran, the wealthy owner of the priceless Lassiter laser pistol, both of whom also married her. Mal quips on this name confusion in "Trash" by calling her "Yo-Saff-Bridge".

According to Serenity crew member and Companion Inara Serra, Saffron has had some Companion training. This organization of legal, high-society courtesans appears to provide its members with psychological education to enable them to establish more than a merely sexual relationship with their clients. Saffron uses these skills to help her seduce her marks, even attempting to seduce Inara herself.

Both Mal and Durran suspect Saffron is mentally unbalanced, because she reverts to seduction when caught or trapped. This usually follows events of aggression toward or contempt for her targets. She seems unable to trust anyone, telling Mal that everyone plays everybody else.

=== Tracey Smith ===
Tracey Smith was a buddy of Malcolm Reynolds and Zoe Alleyne from the war against the Alliance. Mal helped get Tracey through the war, but after the war Tracey became something of a drifter, eventually falling in with organ smugglers. When he runs afoul of them, he arranges to have his apparently dead body shipped to Reynolds for transportation back home. In reality Tracey is drugged into a deep coma to simulate this postmortem state, trying to double-cross the organ smugglers.

Cornered by Alliance officers who are after the illegal organs that Tracey is carrying, the crew of Serenity plans their escape, but Tracey misunderstands their intentions and takes Kaylee hostage, thinking that they intend to hand him over to the soldiers. He informs Mal that he sought out Mal and Zoe because they were saps.

In the ensuing conflict, Tracey is shot by Zoe, then again by Malcolm, and dies shortly after learning that the soldiers hunting them were there illegally and would not be missed if they were killed. He subsequently apologizes to Mal and Zoe before dying. He is portrayed in "The Message" by Jonathan M. Woodward.

=== Gabriel and Regan Tam ===
Gabriel and Regan Tam are River and Simon's parents. Well-to-do, they take great pride in their social position and Simon's achievement. They support the Alliance and do not believe it could or would do anything to harm their daughter, River, who was in their care in a special school. In the episode "Safe", Simon expresses both his concern that River is in danger and his belief that River's nonsensical letters are a code to his parents, who scoff at the idea, saying that the letters are one of River and Simon's "games" and that Simon is just "lost" without his sister.

Later in the same episode Simon is apparently arrested for his actions involving trying to gain access to River. His father is seen bailing him out through legal means, but warns Simon that if he gets into trouble a second time he will no longer be part of the family. In a deleted scene, Gabriel hints that he has his suspicions about the Government school but is too afraid to confront the Alliance because it could lead to a loss of status.

In "Safe", Gabriel Tam is played by William Converse-Roberts and Regan Tam is played by Isabella Hofmann.

=== Atherton Wing ===
Atherton Wing is a young nobleman on Persephone who has hired Inara Serra on multiple occasions. On some of these occasions, he has proposed a more permanent arrangement with her. In "Shindig", at a fancy ball to which he has taken Inara as his partner, he refers to Inara in terms which reflect his regard for her as a valuable slave or piece of property, causing Mal to strike him. In Atherton's social circle (and unbeknownst to Mal), such an attack is regarded as an invitation to a duel, which he accepts.

Wing is known on Persephone as a master swordsman and duelist (which Mal is definitely not), but he is defeated due to Inara's intervention and Reynolds' ruthless combat soldier's skills. Angered by his loss, he threatens her with physical and professional harm, but Inara tells him that he is the one in trouble: Wing now has a black mark in the Companion books, and will be henceforth unable to hire Companions. The character is played by Edward Atterton.

=== Yolanda ===
See Saffron
