= Out of Gas (Firefly) =

- Firefly episode
- Episode no.: Season 1 Episode 8
- Directed by: David Solomon
- Written by: Tim Minear
- Production code: 1AGE07
- Original air date: October 25, 2002

Guest appearances
- Steven Flynn as Captain Sash; Ilia Volok as Marco; Lyle Kanouse as Salesman; Dax Griffin as Bester

Episode chronology
← Previous "Jaynestown"	Next → "Ariel"

"Out of Gas" is the eighth episode of the science fiction television series Firefly created by Joss Whedon. It differs stylistically from the rest of the series, in that it tells its story alternately in three timeframes: events in the present, events in the near-past that led to the present, and events in the past that led to the formation of Serenity's core crew.

After Serenity suffers a catastrophe that leaves her crew with only hours of oxygen, flashbacks show how Mal and Zoe acquired Serenity and assembled their motley crew.

== Synopsis ==
The Serenity is en-route to Greenleaf, with the crew assembled in the kitchen to celebrate Simon's birthday. Suddenly, the ship's compression coil blows out, disabling the engine and critically injuring Zoe. With the engine offline, the main life support system has no power, and Kaylee soon reports to Mal that the backup system was disabled by either the explosion or the ensuing fire. With only a few hours of oxygen left, Mal orders the crew to divide into two groups and head off in opposite directions in the Serenity's two shuttles, while he stays behind with the ship in case someone picks up their distress signal.

Hours later, a salvage ship arrives and makes contact with Mal. He offers to trade the captain anything in the cargo hold for a new catalyzer, but the salvagers shoot Mal in the stomach and attempt to commandeer the Serenity for scrap. Mal is able to pull a hidden gun and forces the salvagers to drop the catalyzer and leave the ship. Bleeding from a stomach wound and on the verge of passing out, Mal manages to get the new catalyzer installed and restarts the engine just as the ship's oxygen runs out. He then staggers up to the bridge, but falls unconscious before he can recall the shuttles.

He wakes up in the infirmary, surrounded by the rest of the crew while Wash is hooked up to him as part of a blood transfusion. A supine but conscious Zoe welcomes him back. She reveals that she ordered the crew to return to Serenity when she regained consciousness, against Mal's orders. Mal thanks her for disobeying him and falls back asleep, though not before asking Shepherd Book to assure him that the crew will still be there when he wakes back up.

Spread throughout the episode is a sequence of flashbacks showing the events that led to each crew member joining the ship. Flashbacks are intercut with the two more recent timelines based on spatial relationships, contrasting past events in certain areas of the ship with current ones. First, Mal, having just obtained the Serenity from a used-ships dealer, convinces Zoe to sign on as his first mate. He then hires Hoban Washburne, a skilled pilot whom Zoe finds bothersome, and a laid-back mechanic named Bester. On a layover for repairs, Bester brings a young woman to the engine room for sex; this woman, Kaylee Frye, soon replaces him as engineer when she points out Bester's mistakes in repairing the engine and gets it running. Mal then decides to hire out the Serenity's shuttles, and meets Inara Serra, who uses her high status as a Companion to bargain for a 25% discount on the rent. She also insists that Mal never call her a "whore" again (a promise that he makes without ever keeping it). During one of their first jobs as a crew, Mal and Zoe are held up by a crew of bandits, including gunman Jayne Cobb. Mal, realizing that Jayne is being exploited by his greedy comrades, talks him into betraying them and switching sides.

The episode closes with a final flashback, as Mal and the ship dealer are inspecting a vessel. As the dealer waxes poetic about his offerings, Mal's eye suddenly spots a neglected old transport ship in the rear of the dealer's yard - Serenity.

== Production ==
According to the DVD commentary, Alan Tudyk took the big red "recall" button from the Firefly set and presented it to Joss Whedon, telling him that if Whedon managed to get the series renewed, he could press it to call the cast back.

Also according to the commentary, Gina Torres (Zoe) was written out of the bulk of the episode because the filming took place just after her marriage to Laurence Fishburne and they were away on their honeymoon.

Tim Minear credits David Solomon's expertise as a director with the success of the episode's daring three-timeline structure.

Show creator and executive producer Joss Whedon lists "Out of Gas" as one of the "three favorite projects he's ever been involved in," the other two being a Buffy the Vampire Slayer episode and comic book.

== Guest cast ==
- Steven Flynn as the Captain who tries to steal the disabled Serenity
- Ilia Volok as Marco, a bandit Jayne once worked for
- Lyle Kanouse as Salesman
- Dax Griffin as Bester

== Reception ==
In 2012, Noel Murray and Donna Bowman of The A.V. Club rewatched the episode. Bowman was impressed by the episode as a whole that was "structured creatively and executed with panache." Murray was interested not only by the unusual structure but how it was used to expand and deepen the history of the characters.
