= Jaynestown =

- Firefly episode
- Episode no.: Season 1 Episode 7
- Directed by: Marita Grabiak
- Written by: Ben Edlund
- Production code: 1AGE06
- Original air date: October 18, 2002

Guest appearances
- Gregory Itzin as Magistrate Higgins; Daniel Bess as Mudder; Kevin Gage as Stitch Hessian; Zachary Kranzler as Fess Higgins

Episode chronology
← Previous "Our Mrs. Reynolds"	Next → "Out of Gas"

"Jaynestown" is the seventh episode of the science fiction television series Firefly created by Joss Whedon.

Returning to a moon where he ran into some serious trouble years ago, Jayne discovers that he's become a local folk legend. Mal decides to use this entertaining distraction to complete a job, but some unfinished business may derail his plans.

"Jaynestown" originally premiered on Fox as the show's fourth episode. It aired on October 18, 2002 following a two-week hiatus due to Fox Sports' coverage of the MLB postseason game between the Anaheim Angels and the Minnesota Twins the previous Friday.

== Plot ==
Inara departs for an overnight meeting with a client, while the rest of Serenity's crew prepares to disembark at the town of Canton to pick up some illegal goods for a client. Mal and Simon catch Jayne trying to use medical tape to hide a gun under his shirt, in violation of Canton's no-gun law. Jayne says he needs it because he has enemies on Canton, but Mal orders him to leave the gun behind.

The crew reaches Canton, with Simon posing as a merchant looking to purchase industrial clay and the others as his employees. After talking with the foreman, they enter the town, where they find a statue of the "Hero of Canton", which to Jayne's shock is him. At a tavern, the crew hears a folk song revealing that the locals, who refer to themselves as "mudders", worship Jayne as their savior. Jayne reveals that years ago, he robbed the local magistrate, Higgins, but his getaway vehicle was damaged and he was forced to dump the stolen money to escape. The loot apparently rained down on the mudders, causing them to mistakenly believe that he robbed the magistrate to protest his corrupt rule. Jayne is recognized and the mudders surround and honor him. Mal's smuggling contact is horrified, fearing that the authorities will catch wind of their presence, but Mal decides to use Jayne's popularity to their advantage by convincing the mudders to throw a celebration for Jayne while they move the goods to Serenity.

Inara meets with Higgins, who introduces her to his 26-year-old son Fess. Fess is still a virgin, so the magistrate has hired Inara to "make a man of him". She reassures Fess that there is nothing wrong with his being a virgin, and after having sex with him, talks about how he needs to be his own man and not let his father control his life. Higgins and his foreman release a half-blind man, Stitch Hessian, from what appears to have been four years of solitary confinement in a very small cell, giving him a loaded shotgun and telling him that this is his chance to get revenge on his old partner, Jayne.

On the ship, an agitated River tears up Shepherd Book's Bible, insisting that it makes no sense and that she has to "fix" it. Book manages to calm her down and explains that the Bible cannot be understood in a logical or scientific sense, but rather acts as an instrument of faith that fixes people rather than needing fixing itself. Later, she attempts to repair and return it to him, but panics when she sees his wild head of hair (per the rules of his order) that he normally keeps in a tight bun. Zoe then forces Book to tie his hair back when River tries to hide from him.

Inara prepares to return to the ship. When Fess expresses puzzlement at not feeling any different now that his virginity is gone, she explains to him that being a man is about being old enough to ask such a question rather than just having sex. Inara then learns from Fess that Jayne is set to either be killed or arrested by the magistrate's men, and that the ship has been "land-locked". He tells her that he sympathizes with what Jayne did, and hopes that he can escape.

Mal returns to fetch Kaylee and Simon from the bar, finding the mechanic draped over the doctor on a couch. He tries to explain to Mal how "nothing happened", but once again manages to accidentally insult the frustrated Kaylee. Collecting a tipsy Jayne, they head off, but Kaylee stops Simon in his tracks with her scorn. As the doctor eats breakfast alone, Stitch arrives. The scarred criminal brutalizes him in an attempt to locate Jayne, but the roars of an approving crowd outside give away his location instead. Stitch drags Simon along as a hostage to confront Jayne.

Stitch tells the mudders that he helped Jayne steal the money, and that when they found themselves needing to reduce weight, Jayne chose to throw him out first instead of the money; Jayne retorts that Stitch would have done the same. Stitch then shoots, but a young mudder jumps in front of Jayne and is killed. Jayne kills Stitch with his knife, and screams at the mudders that he is no hero and that they shouldn't have to wait for someone to come along and solve all their problems. He then tears down his own statue and angrily grabs his knife from the hands of a young boy before storming off with the crew.

Wash attempts to start the ship, but is unable to achieve ignition due to the land-lock. It is quickly released, however, due to Fess using his position to order Serenity's release. Kaylee has a heart-to-heart talk with Simon but cannot resist briefly making him worry about what happened after the previous night's party. In the cargo bay, Jayne broods about the mudder's sacrifice and how the townsfolk will probably put the statue back up and continue to worship him. Mal attempts to explain to Jayne the hero worship is not about him, but about what the townsfolk need, but Jayne only replies: "Don't make no sense."

== Guest cast ==
- Gregory Itzin as Magistrate Higgins
- Daniel Bess as the young mudder who sacrifices himself for Jayne.
- Kevin Gage as Stitch Hessian
- Zachary Kranzler as Fess Higgins

== Bibliography ==
- Espenson, Jane; Glenn Yeffeth, eds. (2005). Finding Serenity: Anti-heroes, Lost Shepherds and Space Hookers in Joss Whedon's "Firefly". Dallas, Texas: Benbella Books. ISBN 1-932100-43-1.
- Rhonda V. Wilcox; Tanya Cochran (May 20, 2008). Investigating Firefly and Serenity: Joss Whedon's Worlds Beyond: Science Fiction on the Frontier (Investigating Cult TV Series). I B Tauris & Co Ltd. ISBN 978-1-84511-654-5.
- Joss Whedon (September 1, 2005). Serenity: The Official Visual Companion. Titan Books Ltd. ISBN 978-1-84576-082-3.
- Joss Whedon; et al. (August 25, 2006). Firefly: The Official Companion: Volume One. Titan Books Ltd. ISBN 978-1-84576-314-5.
- Joss Whedon; et al. (August 25, 2006). Firefly: The Official Companion: Volume Two. Titan Books Ltd. ISBN 978-1-84576-372-5.
- Joss Whedon (December 9, 2003). The Complete Series: Commentary for "Serenity" (DVD). 20th Century Fox.
