= The Train Job =

- Firefly episode
- Episode no.: Season 1 Episode 2
- Directed by: Joss Whedon
- Written by: Joss Whedon; Tim Minear
- Production code: 1AGE01
- Original air date: September 20, 2002

Guest appearances
- Tom Towles as Lund; Andrew Bryniarski as Crow; Michael Fairman as Adelai Niska; Gregg Henry as Sheriff Bourne; Jeff Ricketts as Man; Dennis Cockrum as Other Man

Episode chronology
← Previous "Serenity"	Next → "Bushwhacked"

"The Train Job" is the original series premiere and second episode of the American science-fiction western television series Firefly created by Joss Whedon. It was the second episode produced and aired on Friday, September 20, 2002, on Fox. The episode was written by Whedon and Tim Minear as the second pilot to the series following Fox after executives were unsatisfied with original pilot "Serenity", which later aired as the series finale. According to the 2003 DVD commentary, Whedon and Minear had only two days to write the script.

The crew of Serenity take on a hovertrain robbery commissioned by a sinister crime lord. However, the cargo is worth more than they realize.

== Synopsis ==
Captain Malcolm "Mal" Reynolds, Zoe and Jayne Cobb are in a bar. When a drunk patron celebrates the sixth anniversary of the Alliance's victory on Unification Day with a toast, Mal, a former Browncoat soldier, picks a fight. Zoe immediately backs him up, and Jayne hesitates before reluctantly joining. Outnumbered, Mal radios his pilot, Wash, for help. Serenity rescues them, despite the ship not having any weapons. In the ship's infirmary, Dr. Simon Tam tends to his mentally disturbed teenage sister River. Another passenger, "Shepherd" (preacher) Book, tells Mal that Simon is brave to sacrifice his life of luxury to go on the run and protect his sister.

On a "skyplex" (an orbiting space city), Mal, Zoe, and Jayne meet crime lord Adelei Niska and his hulking lieutenant, Crow, to arrange a job. Niska sadistically shows them the body of the last person who failed him. The job is to steal two crates from a moving train, which Mal shows no interest in knowing the contents of.

During the heist, Mal and Zoe sneak past an entire squad of Alliance troops who are coincidentally on the train. They break into the locked train car and find the crates, while Serenity flies over the speeding train and lowers Jayne on a winch to collect the cargo. Meanwhile, a curious trooper sets off a booby trap that Zoe had set. Jayne is wounded, and Mal knocks out the soldier before he can see what is happening. Jayne and the crates are hoisted onto the ship, whilst Mal and Zoe covertly reenter the passenger car and pretend to be regular passengers.

Wash parks Serenity in a nearby canyon. Jayne wants to get to the rendezvous point and finish the job, but Wash refuses to leave without Mal and Zoe. When Jayne tries to take the ship by force, Simon sedates him.

Meanwhile, Mal learns that the stolen cargo is desperately needed medicine. The nearby mining town is afflicted with "Bowden's Malady", a degenerative disease caused by mining activity. The local sheriff is suspicious of Mal's cover story that he and Zoe are a married couple looking for work. Inara appears and uses her considerable status as a Companion, falsely claiming that Mal is her runaway "indentured man" who persuaded Zoe to leave her husband. The impressed sheriff lets her take the "runaways" back into her own custody.

Mal decides they will deliver the medicine to the townspeople and return Niska's money. Niska's henchmen find them first, and a fight ensues. The Serenity crew wins, and secures the villains. Mal and Zoe drive the cargo to the town, intending to drop off the crates discreetly. They are surprised by the sheriff and his deputies, who realize what they have done. They are grateful for the return of the medicine and allow them to go free.

Mal tries to negotiate with Crow but he says Niska will refuse, and promises to hunt down and kill him. Mal casually kills Crow, and the next henchman agrees to cooperate. Elsewhere, on an Alliance cruiser, two mysterious men in suits and wearing blue gloves inquire about a girl and show the captain a photo of River Tam.

== Production ==
On May 3, 2002, Fox rejected the original two-part pilot episode "Serenity". Within two weeks, series writers Joss Whedon and Tim Minear had created a new pilot to introduce the show's characters, themes, and story elements to new audiences. The duo completed the script on May 16. Production on "The Train Job" began on July 8, 2002.

The ominous "Hands of Blue", two men who are pursuing River, first appear in this episode.

As noted by Tim Minear in the DVD commentary, Book's knowledge of underworld dealings (particularly his theory of Niska's reaction to an incarcerated Mal and Zoe) alludes to his cryptic past.

== Guest cast ==
- Tom Towles as Lund, a thug at the bar Mal, Zoe, and Jayne drink at, who takes a disliking to Mal
- Andrew Bryniarski as Crow
- Michael Fairman as Adelai Niska
- Gregg Henry as Sheriff Bourne
- Jeff Ricketts as Blue Glove Man #1
- Dennis Cockrum as Blue Glove Man #2

== Reception ==
"The Train Job" was first aired in the United States on Fox on Friday September 20, 2002. It was followed directly by the premiere of another series, John Doe. According to Nielsen Media Research, it had an average of 6.20 million viewers and was ranked 66th overall for the week. The premiere of John Doe had an average of 9.79 million viewers and was ranked 28th overall.

Scott D. Pierce of the Deseret News found it "quite entertaining" but advised viewers to "go in looking for a Western with sci-fi touches." Steve Johnson of the Chicago Tribune thought it was "intriguing but not compelling, but it least has the promise of a bright fellow at the helm." Caryn James of The New York Times was unconvinced by the mix of genres and called the episode "a confusing mess", acknowledging that Fox shelved the original pilot, and said "there's still a possibility that Firefly might be fixed."
