= Ariel (Firefly episode) =

- Firefly episode
- Episode no.: Season 1 Episode 9
- Directed by: Allan Kroeker
- Written by: Jose Molina
- Production code: 1AGE08
- Original air date: November 15, 2002

Guest appearances
- Blake Robbins as Agent McGinnis; Jeff Ricketts as Man; Dennis Cockrum as Other Man; Tom Virtue as Pompous Doctor

Episode chronology
← Previous "Out of Gas"	Next → "War Stories"

"Ariel" is the ninth episode of the science fiction television series Firefly, created by Joss Whedon.

Hard up for cash, the crew of the Serenity takes on a job from Simon: break into an Alliance hospital on the central planet of Ariel so Simon can perform a thorough diagnostic of River and the crew can loot the valuable stores of medicine. But River's pursuers are hot on their trail, and they receive some unexpected inside help.

== Plot summary ==
After dropping off Shepherd Book for a religious retreat, Serenity heads to Ariel, a central world of the Union of Allied Planets, where Inara is due for her annual Companion physical exam and license renewal. Following an incident in which River attacks him with a kitchen knife, Jayne demands that she and Simon be dismissed from the crew and left on Ariel. Mal declines to do so and puts Jayne in his place for insubordination, but privately warns Simon that River has to be kept under control. Simon acknowledges that his sister's condition is getting worse.

The crew is bemoaning their recent run of bad luck in finding jobs when Simon approaches them with a proposal. Aware that Ariel City has one of the Alliance's best hospitals, he decides to smuggle River in so he can scan her brain using the hospital's advanced diagnostic equipment. As payment, he informs the crew that all Alliance hospitals have well-stocked pharmaceutical lockers that are replenished daily, enabling them to steal millions of credits worth of drugs without anyone noticing.

Simon puts himself and River into medically-induced comas so they appear to be dead, allowing the crew to enter the hospital dressed in EMT uniforms on a refurbished medical shuttle Wash and Kaylee find in a scrapyard. The group then splits up, with Jayne assigned to keep tabs on Simon as he analyzes River's condition while Mal and Zoe steal the drugs. Jayne secretly contacts an Alliance officer, McGuinness, and agrees to turn in the Tam siblings for their bounty. Once awakened, Simon, disguised as a doctor with River as his patient, brings her to the diagnostic ward and conducts his examination. He discovers that River's brain is missing its amygdala, preventing her from suppressing her emotions or negative thoughts.

With the analysis complete, Jayne leads the siblings to a rear entrance, where they are arrested by Alliance marshals; Jayne is double-crossed by McGuinness, who intends to keep the bounty for himself. Mal and Zoe return to the medical shuttle with the loot, but realize that Jayne and the Tams are late and head back into the hospital with their weapons to find them. The three prisoners are moved to a holding area, where Jayne and Simon overpower their guards and escape. Shortly afterwards, two blue-gloved men arrive to take custody of the Tams, using a mysterious sonic device to kill McGuinness and the other marshals when the pair learn that some of them talked to the Tams. Meanwhile, a terrified River leads Jayne and Simon through the rear of the hospital to a locked door, where Mal shoots out the lock and rescues them.

Inara returns to Serenity just as the crew arrives. Once everyone else has left the cargo area, Mal knocks Jayne out. Jayne awakens to find himself in an open airlock as the ship begins to leave Ariel's atmosphere. A terrified Jayne confesses his betrayal, and Mal tells him that when he betrays one of the crew, it's the same as betraying him. As Mal turns to leave, Jayne asks him not to tell the others about what he did. Mal silently agrees and seals the airlock, but leaves Jayne stuck inside for some time as punishment. Simon is about to administer a drug to his sister when River asks if it's time to "go to sleep" again. Simon replies "No. It's time to wake up."

== Production ==
Dr. Tam, Jayne, Kaylee, and Malcolm after their raid of an Alliance hospital. Malcolm's hugging Kaylee was improvised by Nathan Fillion.

The medical shuttle that appears in the episode and is used to ferry the main characters back and forth from St. Lucy's is built from a 2/3 scale model of a Soviet Mil Mi-24 Hind D helicopter. A group of fans have bought the scrapped medical shuttle (from a scrapyard in Mojave, California), and are in the process of restoring it, hoping to show it on the Firefly convention circuit.

When the crew returns to Serenity after their successful raid of the Alliance hospital, Malcolm grabs Kaylee from behind and pulls her into a friendly hug. This was improvised by Nathan Fillion, and was left in the shot because Joss Whedon felt it was such a natural movement for Malcolm to make.

== Notes ==
- Espenson, Jane, ed. (March 11, 2005). Finding Serenity: Anti-heroes, Lost Shepherds and Space Hookers in Joss Whedon's "Firefly". with Glenn Yeffeth. Dallas, Texas: Benbella Books. ISBN 1-932100-43-1.
- Rhonda V. Wilcox; Tanya Cochran (May 20, 2008). Investigating Firefly and Serenity: Joss Whedon's Worlds Beyond: Science Fiction on the Frontier (Investigating Cult TV Series). I B Tauris & Co. Ltd. ISBN 978-1-84511-654-5.
- Joss Whedon (September 1, 2005). Serenity: The Official Visual Companion. Titan Books Ltd. ISBN 978-1-84576-082-3.
- Joss Whedon; et al. (August 25, 2006). Firefly: The Official Companion: Volume One. Titan Books Ltd. ISBN 978-1-84576-314-5.
- Joss Whedon; et al. (August 25, 2006). Firefly: The Official Companion: Volume Two. Titan Books Ltd. ISBN 978-1-84576-372-5.
- Joss Whedon (December 9, 2003). The Complete Series: Commentary for "Serenity" (DVD). 20th Century Fox.
