= Alliance (Firefly) =

Fictional government

Union of Allied Planets flag (episode "The Train Job").

The Alliance, formally known as the Union of Allied Planets, (Note: Chinese: 行星联盟; pinyin: Xíngxīng Liánméng) is a powerful fictional corporate supergovernment and law-enforcement organization in the Firefly franchise that controls the majority of territory within the known universe.

It consists of Sihnon, a mostly East and Southeast Asian–themed planet led by the People's Republic of China (PRC), and Londinium, a world with mostly Northern American and Western European influences led by the United States of America (USA). It retains a mixture of both Western and Eastern cultures. English and Mandarin Chinese are commonly used languages, with most of the inhabitants under the Alliance being bilingual.

Originally composed solely of a number of "core worlds", several years prior to the show's time frame the Alliance fought the Unification War to bring all colonized worlds under its control. The Independent Faction or "Browncoats" wanted the outer worlds to remain autonomous and attempted to resist Alliance control. The war raged for several years, resulting in heavy casualties on both sides, until the Alliance emerged victorious. An armistice was signed between the Alliance and the Independent Faction, thus ending the war and securing Alliance control over the entirety of the system.

== Name ==
The scripts for the pilot, "Serenity", and the first broadcast episode, "The Train Job". refer to an "AngloSino" flag on the IAV spaceship Dortmunder and on the stolen boxes. The Alliance flag shown in the pilot is a blending of the American and Chinese flags, having the blue field and the red and white stripes of the United States flag and the red field and yellow stars of the Chinese flag. Two versions of this flag, one with 13 stripes and one with five stripes, appear in the series.

The alliance is formally described as the Union of Allied Planets in the episode "Ariel".

== Corporations ==
The Blue Sun corporation is a powerful conglomerate with much influence within the Alliance. Joss Whedon compared it with "Coca-Cola or Microsoft" and said that "practically half the government was Blue Sun." Their agents are "Hands of Blue." The Weyland-Yutani corporation from Alien is also alluded to; its logo appears on Alliance weapons. In the movie Serenity, the Alliance also hires local security companies.

== Universe ==
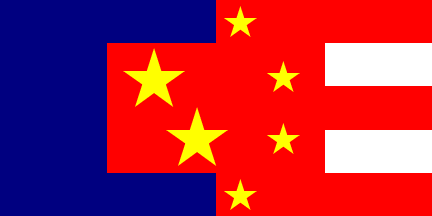
An alternate Union of Allied Planets flag (episode "Bushwacked").

The two worlds that make up the "core planets" (the first worlds to be terraformed) are Sihnon, a mostly East and Southeast Asian–themed planet, and Londinium, a world with mostly American and Western European influences. The alliance of the two worlds leads up to a multi-racial, multi-ethnic, and multi-religious universe.

The Alliance may have some elements of a monarchy. In "Serenity," Malcolm Reynolds (Serenity's captain) said "I'd like to be king of all Londinium" and many of Inara Serra's customers are Lords. However, "King of all Londinium" may just be an idiom (cf "king of the world" in modern usage) and Lord could merely be a political title. (Note: Similar to the courtesy-titles for judges and elected mayors of some cities in Britain (e.g., the “Lord Mayor of London”).)

There is also evidence that the Alliance may have some elements of a technocracy, as in a flashback within the episode "Safe", Simon Tam's parents chastised Simon's fear for River as potentially threatening his future, including the possibility of becoming the medical-elect, presumably the equivalent of an elected Technocrat representing the Medical sector.

In Serenity, the movie set in the Firefly universe, it is revealed that the Alliance is run by a Parliament, as well as a prime minister. This invites the possibility that the Alliance is a constitutional monarchy and Westminster parliamentary system with the inclusion of technocratically elected members, where outside of the central planets, oligarchies through lordships represent local colonial governance.

It appears that this Alliance was a melding of the People's Republic of China (PRC) and the United States of America (USA). The Alliance retains a mixture of both Western and Eastern cultures from the "Earth-That-Was", the original home of all humans, spearheaded by the Americans and the Chinese.

Generally, the Alliance is rather authoritarian, although Joss Whedon, the series' creator, has said this is at least partly because the show is seen from the viewpoint of those hostile to the Alliance. Whedon himself admits that sometimes, the Alliance is like the predominant view that the United States saw itself in World War II: doing "very good things", helping people and spreading democracy. At other times the Alliance can tend towards black ops and power-grabbing, although rarely more so than any real-world democracy.

Due to the melding of American and Chinese influences in the Alliance, most people in the Firefly universe are equally adept in speaking both English and Mandarin Chinese; some characters on the show speak Chinese at times (usually when using obscenities, so Whedon wouldn't have to bleep anything out and ruin the suspension of disbelief), and many signs are printed in both English and Chinese. Additionally, during the episode "Out of Gas," Serenity's warning messages over the intercom are repeated in both English and Cantonese. The Chinese spoken is based on Mandarin (intermixed with Cantonese), but the pronunciation is heavily corrupted from the real-world language by the actors.

Chinese appears to be the superior language in Alliance society as it is used for written public communications and for polite address between strangers. For example, when the Alliance agent McGinnis, answers the intercom in the episode "Ariel", he uses, 你好 (ni hao) rather than hello.

== Alliance military ==
Uniforms worn by various characters

The Alliance operates a fleet of massive spaceships, resembling huge floating cities, that act as both military and police in the space between the various planets of the Firefly Universe. Alliance ships have the registry prefix IAV (Interstellar Alliance Vessel): e.g., IAV Dortmunder and IAV Magellan. The pilot episode of the series reveals that the large city-ships carry smaller gunships; these are never named nor described further. In the episode "Bushwhacked," it is revealed that Alliance ships have nurseries.

In the film Serenity, there appear a fleet of sleeker, more streamlined warships, suggesting that the film had a higher CGI budget.

Alliance ground troops are nicknamed "purple bellies" (in contrast to the Independent "browncoats"). Crewmembers on Alliance starships wear gray uniforms resembling those worn by Imperial German Army from World War I; officers and enlisted crew are identically dressed (except for headgear: officers wear hats, enlisted crew wear berets). In Serenity, Alliance crew members wear blue uniforms.

The exact structure of the Alliance military, such as its rank system and branch organization, is not described. Some Alliance officers are seen with naval ranks, such as Commander, and others with ground force ranks such as Colonel and General.

== Future ==
During the events of the 2005 film, the crew of Serenity discover the truth behind River Tam's insanity; she had discovered the truth behind the Reavers, in which the Alliance had inadvertently created the first Reavers in an attempt to create peace on the planet Miranda. Malcolm Reynolds resolves to reveal this to the universe, and after a lengthy battle with the Operative, succeeds in doing so, ruining the Operative's faith in the Alliance's methods and revealing the existence of the Reavers (plus the true colors of the Alliance) to the system at large. Before he departs, the Operative tells Mal of how much trouble he had caused the Alliance (in the shooting script, he states that they had gotten multiple complaints from several worlds), and warns him that, although their regime is weakened, they will be after him in revenge.

== Critical analyses ==
Author Stanley C. Pelkey notes the marked influence of the Western genre on the Firefly franchise. He says that in contrast to most westerns, the central civilizing force (the Alliance) is portrayed as evil. He goes on to say that little concrete evidence is given to support this, especially in the series as opposed to the movie. He notes an example where the Alliance gave medical aid to a Serenity crew member, and then let the ship go, and contrasts it with the implausibility of similar treatment being afforded to the rebels by an Imperial Star Destroyer from the Star Wars milieu. (Note: Note, however, that medical aid is given to Shepherd Book only after showing his ID badge to the Alliance crew, to which they react with surprise followed by deference — no other crew members received such treatment. Shepherd Book receives free medical treatment for a very specific reason explained in the graphic novel The Shepherd's Tale.) Pelkey says that even in the movie with its "dark revelation," there is still some ambiguity about the Alliance's moral alignment.

Whedon himself has said the Alliance sometimes represents a "beautiful shining light of democracy" but at other times reflects the American government as it was when it intervened in Vietnam, which Whedon sees as something the U.S. had no right to do, nor any ability to do successfully.

== See also ==
- Galactic Empire (Star Wars)
- United Federation of Planets (Star Trek)
- Peacekeepers (Farscape)
