= Shepherd Book =

Character from Firefly

- Firefly character
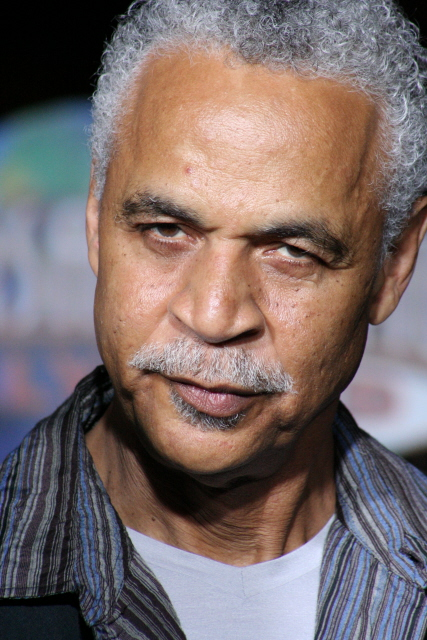
- Derrial Book is portrayed by Ron Glass, pictured here
- First appearance: "Serenity" (2002)
- Last appearance: Serenity (2005)
- Created by: Joss Whedon
- Portrayed by: Ron Glass

In-universe information
- Gender: Male
- Occupation: Preacher
- Relatives: Unknown; "never married"
- Religion: Christian
- Homeworld: Unknown

Derrial Book (commonly called Shepherd Book and born as Henry Evans) is a fictional character played by Ron Glass in the science-fiction/Western television series Firefly and its sequel movie, Serenity. He is a Shepherd (the literal English translation of the clerical title "Pastor", from the Latin), and provides frequent spiritual advice and perspectives for the crew of Serenity.

== Production details ==
During production of the film Serenity, Book's first name was Meria, and it appears as such in the documentary "Re-Lighting the Firefly". However, by the time the film was completed, Joss Whedon changed his first name to Derrial, which is the way it appears in all printed official works based on Firefly.

=== Casting ===
Glass, a veteran actor well known for his role as Detective Ron Harris in the television sitcom Barney Miller, had rarely tackled the science-fiction genre and was hesitant about this role when his agent approached him. However, once he read the script he "...fell in love with it". As Glass noted:

"The thing that was galvanizing for me was the characters, so the environment was secondary. I was happy to see how Book would unfold in that kind of environment and it worked really, really well."

=== Costume design ===
Glass stated that Whedon and the costume designer Shawna Trpcic "had a pretty clear idea of how they wanted him to look", and how he appears in the pilot with a distinctly priestly collar and scant possessions "was a strong reflection of the character". For the role in the film Serenity, Trpcic decided to make Book's clothing tighter after seeing his physique.

=== Character background ===
Book's character during the series is a preacher, and though Glass discussed with Whedon about making him more Buddhist, Whedon explained that the character of Inara Serra was to be the Buddhist-type and Book more of the "fundamentalist Christian guy". Glass, himself a Buddhist, found it intriguing to play this role:

"What I was able to bring to the Christian part of it was the humanism and the humanistic point of view. It was the hook in terms of being able to make that adjustment. I wasn't born Buddhist, so I do have some other traditions to pull from."

— Ron Glass

Whedon conceived the character because he felt that faith was important to people dealing with being that far out in space. As Whedon states, "Shepherd Book is somebody I would probably get along famously with, except we don't agree about anything." He also wanted to give "a voice for the other side".

One of the underlying aspects of the show is Shepherd Book's secret past. He holds some sort of high priority status within the Alliance, and on numerous occasions has demonstrated a depth of knowledge in a number of fields one would not expect a clergyman to be familiar with, including space travel, firearms, hand-to-hand combat, and criminal activity. Glass enjoyed this aspect of the role as well: "Though rather mysterious, it was absolutely clear that he had had a very full life before he went off to the monastery and took on that responsibility. I loved the fact that he could save your soul but he could also kick your ass. That's a really great combination to play."

In the 14th episode of Firefly, "Objects in Space", Simon berates the bounty hunter Jubal Early for assaulting Book, a Shepherd. Early replies, "That ain't a Shepherd." In the DVD commentary Firefly, Whedon states this is due to Early's intuition and ability to quickly size people up. He also comments that Early's methods for dealing with each crew member are custom-tailored to their personalities. Early disposes of Mal in a straightforward manner; Whedon then notes that Early's method for taking out Book is equally straightforward, alluding to a similarity between the two otherwise different characters.

Another hint to Book's mysterious past is shown in the episode "Safe". When Book is accidentally wounded, Mal is forced to seek medical help from an Alliance cruiser. The commanding officer, after tersely dismissing Mal, changes his attitude once one of his officers shows him Book's identification. Though the exact information on the card is never shown, the crew does note that it affords Book urgent and immediate access to the medical facilities on board, as well as free passage for Serenity without the expected inspection. Several other episodes contain allusions to Book's past; in "The Train Job", he is aware of the identity of crime lord Adelei Niska, while in "War Stories", he displays a working knowledge of high-powered weaponry, first to identify sharp-shooters and later to take part in a coordinated assault against Adelei Niska's space station.

On the 2007 Browncoat Cruise, Ron Glass revealed with Whedon's permission several facts about Book, including that Derrial was not the shepherd's real name, but the name of a man he had killed. Also, a "part of [him] is artificial, he found God in a bowl of soup, and [he] is best known for his greatest failure". This was part of an announcement for a comic book series based on Book's past, titled The Shepherd's Tale. Scott Allie, editor for the Serenity: Better Days comic series, confirmed this announcement and stated that Dark Horse Comics was aiming for a late 2008 release. It was later announced that this would be seeing print in November 2010, and was subsequently released November 3, 2010.

During the Dallas Sci Fi Expo 2012 Ron Glass said he did not like the fact that Book had never been married, and would like to have married at some point in the show.

== Character biography ==
The character, almost always referred to as "Shepherd Book", is a Christian of an unknown denomination. The original script for pilot episode "Serenity" includes this scene establishment:

"We see, passing through frame, Shepherd BOOK. […] His clothes are plain and instantly identify him as some kind of Protestant minister."

Throughout the series, he makes references to Christian theology and consults the Bible. Shepherd Book, in the pilot episode for the series, indicates he has been living in the Southdown Abbey and has never been married. Throughout the series there are references to monks at the Southdown Abbey as well as Biblical quotes. Shepherd Book makes references, in both the series and the movie, to having some level of insider knowledge about how the Alliance works. When Mal asks him about this he states: "I wasn't born a Shepherd", but declines to explain further. At one point while critically injured his identification card earned him immediate treatment from Alliance medical personnel when their commanding officer had originally left him to die. When River was able to see into the hearts of the crew, it is hinted that he experienced a cruel and sadistic past. His biography is never fully explained during the show's original run.

In the comic Serenity: Those Left Behind, Book expresses concern that he is being corrupted by living on Serenity and leaves the ship. By the time the movie Serenity begins, he is living on the planet Haven. In the film, Book is killed by an Alliance soldier sent to destroy Haven after Serenity manages to shake an Alliance assassin known only as "The Operative". However, he was not a passive figure in the events leading up to his death; he defended Haven and "killed the ship that killed [them]". His last words to Mal was that he didn't care what Mal believed in, just that he believed in something. The shock of Book's death, and the realization that he can't hide without endangering everyone he meets, leads Mal to stop running.

His background is explored further in the comic book Serenity: The Shepherd's Tale. Book was born Henry Evans, a boy who was raised by an abusive father. He ran away from home and began life as a petty criminal before being recruited by the Independence movement and moving out to the Border Worlds. Long before the Alliance begins the Unification War, forward-thinking Browncoats assign Evans to be a long-term mole. He sheds his old identity by killing a random passerby and stealing his identification card, becoming Derrial Book. His Browncoat superiors keep tabs on him by surgically removing one of his eyes and replacing it with a camera. He joins the Alliance military and quickly moves up in rank. Becoming an officer, Book intentionally leads a risky operation that results in a humiliating defeat for the Alliance. He is forced to retire from the Alliance military. It is implied that the Alliance covers up the loss, therefore not officially punishing Book. Homeless, he visits a soup kitchen and finds God while contemplating a bowl of soup. He takes refuge at an abbey where he becomes a shepherd before leaving on Serenity to become a missionary.

== Major themes ==
=== Relationships ===
- Malcolm Reynolds – Glass approached the relationship with this character as a reflection of his former self. He felt that it was Book's desire to have Mal see the brighter side of himself, but knowing he could not confront him directly, he instead has to do this obliquely. It was a confrontation with Mal in which Book lost his temper to the point of striking him that cemented the Shepherd's decision to leave Serenity. Roger P. Ebertz states that Book and Reynolds "are opposite with regard to religion", but "they also appreciate and respect one another". He compares the relationship of the two characters to yin and yang, they "complement each other in dynamic, yet taut, harmony". And despite their opposing basic views, Book also shows doubt, while Mal "is driven to believe". Eric Greene ascribed part of the fascination of Book's character to his relationship with Reynolds.
- Jayne Cobb – Book has a generally friendly relationship with the normally gruff and unsophisticated Jayne. During the series, they are seen joking with one another during chores and seem to regularly lift weights together. In "The Message", they even engage in some philosophical discussion about death and people's reactions to it.
- Inara Serra – Initially, Book does not agree with Inara's work as a companion, although he is never shown as anything less than respectful of her. He even jokingly hints that he isn't anywhere near as judgmental as Mal would seem to think. At the end of the pilot episode "Serenity", Inara reassures Book when he confesses his doubts and questions to her.
- Kaylee Frye – Book and Kaylee form a relatively immediate bond of friendship, as Kaylee is the crew member inviting passengers aboard in the pilot episode "Serenity", including Book (who offers her some strawberries and her reaction to them hints at their scarcity). Later in the episode, when Kaylee is recovering in the infirmary after being shot in the stomach, Book watches over her and holds her hand. In the episode "Safe", when Book is shot, Kaylee reciprocates: "He did this for me once."
- River Tam – River takes a very analytical approach to religion, which Book seems to find very frustrating. He makes an attempt to explain faith to her at one point, but while intrigued by the concept, it confounds and confuses her. Another strain on their relationship comes when River "corrects" Book's copy of the Bible, as she notes it is full of self-contradictions and inconsistencies. Their relationship is further strained later when, upon attempting to broach the subject of faith again, she sees the preacher with his hair unbound – a sight which terrifies her – and after that she shows no desire to take part in future religious discussions with the Shepherd. In a later scene, he finds her editing a copy of the Bible again, but she says: "Just keep walkin', preacher man." He grimaces slightly but acquiesces, considering it a lost battle. Even so, Book asks after her well-being in a conversation with Simon ("War Stories"), and speaks in her defence after an incident ("Objects in Space").

== Reception and analysis ==
Media scholar Michael W. Marek described Shepherd Book's character as "the preacher with a secret past", which is "a common Old West archetype", although Firefly is set in the future. Book's backstory remained unrevealed but defined him, as he was possibly "seeking redemption from past sins". Marek also stated that Book was the soul of the crew, "the most spiritual of the characters".

In the view of Sam Hampton, Shepherd Book is "the embodiment of monolithic faith", and therefore "a symbol of the old world—'the earth that was'". His dialogues with River Tam represent the dispute between religion and a "myopic" kind of science. Hampton attributes to Book a Durkheimian view of faith, "in which what people believe is not as important as the outcome of belief".

Roger P. Ebertz states that to "some extent, the character of Shepherd Book remains mysterious throughout the series". But it can be said that he is "the most obvious representative of religion on board the ship" and "other characters look to Book for the religious and ethical voice". While Book is defined by creator Joss Whedon as a "fundamentalist Christian guy", Ebertz qualifies that the character is "not, however, a stereotypical fundamentalist. He has a less literal way of interpreting the Bible than most fundamentalists". Ebertz also sees a dynamic in Book's character: He is shown over the course of the series as "both a man of faith and a man of doubt".

Arts commentator Eric Greene described Book as "an endless font of paradox that drew me in, made me want to know more" and wished the character had not been killed in the Serenity movie, feeling that "something worthy was lost" from the franchise. Greene sees the role of Book as the believer in Serenity taken over by the Operative, a fanatic adherent to the idea of the Alliance. But the two characters stand in opposition because they "embody two very different kinds of faith. Book's faith leads him to engage the world. The Operative's faith leads him to dominate it." Greene felt Book stood for many benign, compassionate types of believers, and that the removal of the character denied them "a place in the Whedonverse".
