= Whedon =

Whedon is a surname. Notable people with the surname include:

== People ==
- Frances L. Whedon (1902 – 1998), American meteorologist
- Jed Whedon (born 1975), an American screenwriter and musician; Tom Whedon and brother of Joss Whedon
- John Whedon (1905 – 1991), an American writer for television; Tom Whedon's father and Joss Whedon's grandfather
- Joss Whedon (born 1964), an American writer, director, and executive producer for television
- Tom Whedon (1932 – 2016), an American writer for television; Joss Whedon's father
- Zack Whedon, an American writer for television; son of Tom Whedon and brother of Joss Whedon

== Fictional characters ==
- Evangeline Whedon, a fictional character in the Marvel Comics Universe
- Joe Whedon, a fictional character on the primetime show Brothers & Sisters
- Sarah Whedon, a fictional character on the primetime show Brothers & Sisters

== See also ==
- Weeden (disambiguation)
- Weedon (disambiguation)
