= Dr. Horrible's Sing-Along Blog (soundtrack) =

Soundtrack album by Various artists
- Released: September 1, 2008 (Digital)
- Recorded: March 2008
- Studio: Burnside Studios, Los Angeles, California
- Genre: Pop, rock, musical
- Length: 22:52
- Label: Mutant Enemy
- Producer: Jed Whedon

Dr. Horrible's Sing-Along Blog is the soundtrack to the 2008 web series of the same name. with lyrics and liner notes appearing on the series' website the next day. On the first full day of its release, it was the most downloaded album on iTunes in both Canada and Australia, and reached No. 2 in the U.S. On September 10, 2008, Dr. Horrible's Sing-Along Blog debuted at No. 39 on the Billboard 200 despite being an iTunes exclusive.

The soundtrack was released on CD on December 15, 2008, exclusive to Amazon US.

== Track listing ==
No.	Title	Writer(s)	Performer(s)	Length
1.	"Horrible Theme"	Jed Whedon		0:10
2.	"My Freeze Ray"	Joss Whedon	Neil Patrick Harris	1:38
3.	"Bad Horse Chorus"	Jed Whedon, Joss Whedon	Jed Whedon, Joss Whedon, Zack Whedon	0:33
4.	"Caring Hands"	Maurissa Tancharoen, Jed Whedon	Felicia Day	0:28
5.	"A Man's Gotta Do"	Jed Whedon	Neil Patrick Harris, Nathan Fillion, Felicia Day	2:11
6.	"My Eyes"	Maurissa Tancharoen, Jed Whedon, Joss Whedon	Neil Patrick Harris, Felicia Day	2:45
7.	"Bad Horse Chorus (Reprise)"	Jed Whedon, Joss Whedon	Jed Whedon, Joss Whedon, Zack Whedon	0:14
8.	"Penny's Song"	Maurissa Tancharoen, Jed Whedon	Felicia Day	1:12
9.	"Brand New Day"	Jed Whedon, Joss Whedon	Neil Patrick Harris	1:46
10.	"So They Say"	Jed Whedon, Joss Whedon	Robert Reinis, Zack Whedon, Maurissa Tancharoen, Stacy Shirk, Steve Berg, Felicia Day, Nathan Fillion, David Fury, Marti Noxon, Neil Patrick Harris	2:03
11.	"Everyone's a Hero"	Joss Whedon	Nathan Fillion	2:46
12.	"Slipping"	Joss Whedon	Neil Patrick Harris	2:06
13.	"Everything You Ever"	Joss Whedon, bridge by Jed Whedon	Neil Patrick Harris	2:48
14.	"Horrible Credits"	Jed Whedon		2:12
Total length:				22:52

== Personnel ==
- Danny Chaimson - Piano (11)
- Nick Gusikoff - Guitar (6)
- Stacy Shirk - Backing Vocals (11)
- Maurissa Tancharoen - Backing Vocals (11, 13)
- Amir Yaghmai - Violin (14)
- Jed Whedon - All other instruments, Producer
- Robert Hadley - Mastering
