= Weeden =

Weeden may refer to:

== People ==
- Bert Weeden (1882–1939), American professional baseball player and manager
- Bill Weeden (born 1940), American actor and writer
- Brandon Weeden (born 1983), American National Football League quarterback
- Carl A. Weeden (1916–1941), American navy officer
- Lasse Weeden, American-Norwegian bass player, former member of Bigbang (Norwegian band)
- Laurie Weeden, Australian curler
- Maria Howard Weeden (1846–1905), American artist and author
- Michael Weeden (born 1991), American politician
- Timothy Weeden (born 1951), American politician

== Other uses ==
- USS Weeden (DE-797), US Navy destroyer escort named in honor of Carl A. Weeden
- Weeden Mountain, south of Huntsville, Alabama, United States
- Weeden Elementary School, a public school in Florence, Alabama, United States
- Weeden Heights Primary School, a school in Vermont South, Victoria, Australia
- Weedens, Wisconsin, an unincorporated community

== See also ==
- Weedon (disambiguation)
- Whedon (disambiguation)
