= The Southland (band) =

- Origin: Los Angeles, California, United States
- Genres: Rock; Roots rock College rock Indie rock
- Years active: 2005–2008
- Label: Ruffworld
- Members: Daniel Chaimson; Ethan M. Phillips; Jed Whedon; Nicholas Gusikoff; Andrew Crosby

The Southland was an American rock band from Los Angeles. They featured Jed Whedon on keyboards and vocals, Ethan Phillips on bass guitar, Andy Crosby on drums, Nick Gusikoff on guitar, and Danny Chaimson on keyboards.

The Southland's debut album, Influence of Geography, was released in June 2005. They toured regularly, and supported artists such as Toots & the Maytals, O.A.R., Gavin DeGraw, Tristan Prettyman, Jem, Virginia Coalition, Steel Pulse, and As Fast As. The song "Shadow" from the album Influence of Geography appeared on NBC-TV's Scrubs in late February 2006. They released an EP of demos called MacArthur Park in December 2022 that had been intended for an abandoned second album.
