= Sugarshock! =

Comic written by Joss Whedon and illustrated by Fábio Moon

- MySpace Dark Horse Presents #1 (September 2008)

Publication information
- Publisher: Dark Horse Comics
- Publication date: (online) Aug. 2007 (print) Oct. 2008

Creative team
- Written by: Joss Whedon
- Artist: Fábio Moon
- Colorist: Dave Stewart

Sugarshock! is an online comic written by Joss Whedon and illustrated by Fábio Moon. It was hosted on Myspace as part of Dark Horse Presents. It won a 2008 Eisner Award for Best Digital Comic. The story was later collected in a 2009 print edition.

The plot has humorous undertones, following a struggling rock band that goes on zany, sci-fi oriented adventures.

== Publication history ==
After debuting in August 2007 as part of the MySpace Dark Horse Presents #1 webcomic, the three-chapter story was collected as part of the print anthology MySpace Dark Horse Presents #1 (September 2008). Finally, Sugarshock was released as part of a 44-page one-shot in October 2009.

== Characters ==
- Dandelion Naizen — the band's lead singer and central character. For some reason, she really hates Vikings (despite probably being one) and engages in nonsensical discussions that sometimes turn out to be true.
- Wade (Androuthenyss) — the band's drummer; an exiled alien princess who has fled her emperor father.
- L’Lihdra — guitarist; Wade's alien guardian/bodyguard, who accompanies and protects her.
- Robot Phil — bass player (who is actually a robot).

== Plot ==
The story was originally presented in three eight-page chapters:

- "Battle Royale with Cheese"
- "For Those About to Rock and/or Die"
- "The Greatest Story Ever Blogged"

It follows Dandelion and her struggling rock band, Sugarshock, after they lose a local battle of the bands. On the way home, an alien falls onto their car, carrying a message that Dandelion interprets as an invitation to an intergalactic battle of the bands. The group travels to the extraterrestrial competition, only to discover that they are unwilling participants in a gladiator-style spectacle in which they must fight for their survival.

During the battle, Wade and L'Lihdra reveal their true identities: Wade is an exiled alien princess, and L'Lihdra is her guardian. The competition has been orchestrated (by a previous lover) to bring Wade out of hiding, but Dandelion ultimately saves the day by performing what she calls "the saddest song in the world."

The band returns to Earth, only to discover that the planet has mysteriously disappeared.
