= Heather Horton =

Canadian fine artist

- Born: 1974 (age 51–52); Burlington, Ontario, Canada
- Education: McMaster University and Sheridan's Faculty of Animation, Arts & Design
- Known for: Realism paintings
- Notable work: "Immersion", Whimsy Gallery, Pasadena, CA, 2023 / “Naiad”, Pontone Gallery, London, 2024 / “Recovering My Humanity”, Abbozzo Gallery, Toronto, 2024
- Style: Realism
- Spouse: Joss Whedon (m. 2021)
- Website: http://heatherhorton.com/

Heather Horton is a Canadian fine artist based in Pasadena, California, US. She is known for her colourful, realist paintings, which focus on internal states, contemplative narratives, and often draw from personal connections to her life. Her main body of work are water paintings.

== Early life and education ==
Heather Horton was born in 1974 and raised in Burlington, Ontario, Canada. She holds a Bachelor of Arts in English Literature from McMaster University and completed the Interpretive Illustration program at Sheridan's Faculty of Animation, Arts & Design.

== Career and exhibitions ==
Horton joined Abbozzo Gallery in 2004. In 2007, Horton's artistic contributions were highlighted on Bravo! Canada's series "The Artist's Life."

Several of Horton's paintings were included in the 2018 Lionsgate film "A Simple Favor".

Horton has exhibited her work in numerous solo and group exhibitions. Her solo exhibitions include "Near and Dear" in Chicago, Illinois in 2018, and "Love Story," in Toronto, Ontario, in 2020.

In October 2023, Horton hosted "Immersion," her 16th solo exhibition, in Pasadena, California. The show included over 30 oil paintings.

In February 2024, three of Horton's paintings landed on the lunar surface aboard “Odysseus”, a lunar lander holding the Lunar Codex as a part of NASA and Intuitive Machine's combined efforts. Works from Horton's portfolio were present in nanofiche files aboard all three upcoming launches. Lunar Codex launched miniaturized images of the works of more than 30,000 artists, writers, musicians, and filmmakers from 161 countries to the moon to create the largest archive of contemporary art. Her work has also become a part of the permanent collection at the Canadian Embassy in Ankara, Turkey, as well as the Government of Ontario's permanent collection.

Horton's art was covered in Fine Art Connoisseur Magazine by Sam and Alice Peralta, with her latest solo exhibition titled "Naiad" being displayed June 5 – July 6, 2024 at the Pontone Gallery in Soho, United Kingdom.

Similar work is also currently on displayed via new solo gallery exhibition hosted by Abbozzo Gallery titled "Recovering my Humanity" in Toronto, Canada. Horton is also included in the exhibition "Janela" by Gorka Urbizu.

Heather Horton is part of the Somewhere in the Pines podcast and has on one occasion helped illustrate the murder case focused on by the podcast.

Earlier in 2025, Horton participated in an exhibition called "Shifting Focus: Female Painters & Sculptors 2025" hosted by Pontone Gallery in London, UK. The group exhibition featured Horton's latest work and ran March 7 – April 5, 2025.

In January 2026, Horton presented a new group of paintings with Pontone Gallery at the LA Art Show, taking place January 7–11 at the Los Angeles Convention Center, West Hall, Booth 600. The LA Art Show featured more than 90 galleries and vendors, situating the presentation within a large-scale international contemporary art context. Some of Horton’s work was also included in Art Rooms at the Stile Hotel, an accompanying exhibition January 8–11, 2026, providing an appointment-only viewing experience near the convention center.

== Personal life ==
Horton married filmmaker and writer Joss Whedon in February 2021.
