= Tom Whedon =

American screenwriter and producer (1932–2016)

- Born: Thomas Avery Whedon; August 3, 1932; New York City, U.S.
- Died: March 23, 2016 (aged 83)
- Education: Phillips Exeter Academy (1955)
- Occupation: Screenwriter
- Spouses: Ann Lee (Jeffries) Stearns (divorced); Pam Webber
- Children: 5, including Joss, Jed and Zack
- Parents: John Whedon; Louise Carroll Angell
- Relatives: Maurissa Tancharoen (daughter-in-law)

Thomas Avery Whedon (August 3, 1932 – March 23, 2016) was an American screenwriter and producer from New York known for his work on television programs such as The Golden Girls, Benson, Alice, It's a Living, and The Dick Cavett Show. Whedon began his career as one of the original writers on the 1955 television series Captain Kangaroo. He also collaborated with Jon Stone to produce the 1969 TV film Hey, Cinderella! featuring the Muppets.

In 1973, Whedon won the Primetime Emmy Award for Outstanding Children's Program for the Jim Henson program The Electric Company, which was shared with the show's writing staff. He received two additional Primetime Emmy Award nominations for The Golden Girls in 1990 and 1991 and two Daytime Emmy Award nominations for The Electric Company and Between the Lions. His father, John Whedon, was also a screenwriter. He had five children, including Joss Whedon, Jed Whedon, and Zack Whedon. Tom Whedon died on March 23, 2016.

== Early life ==
Whedon was born in New York City, New York. He was the son of Louise Carroll (Angell) and 1950s TV screenwriter John Whedon. He graduated from Phillips Exeter Academy in 1955. He and his first wife, political activist Ann Lee (née Jeffries) Stearns, are the parents of sons Samuel (b. 1960) and Matthew Thomas (b. 1962), and film and TV screenwriter Joss Whedon (Buffy the Vampire Slayer, Angel, Firefly, Dollhouse, and Marvel's The Avengers). Tom and his second wife, Pam Webber, are the parents of screenwriter and musician Jed Whedon (Dr. Horrible's Sing-Along Blog) and scriptwriter Zack Whedon (Fringe, Deadwood).

== Career ==
He was an original writer for the children's television show Captain Kangaroo, which aired on weekday mornings on CBS from 1955 to 1984.

As early as 1964, he collaborated with Jon Stone on a concept for a puppet-centered children's television series using the fairy-tale Cinderella as a basis. During this process, they became acquainted with the creative, but then relatively unknown, Jim Henson and his Muppets. The trio went on to make the Hey, Cinderella! TV special for ABC in 1970.

In the 1970s, Tom Whedon (along with Stone) worked for the Children's Television Workshop, becoming head writer for the award-winning show The Electric Company. Additional writing credits include the more adult fare of The Dick Cavett Show, Benson, Alice, and The Golden Girls.

== Death ==
Whedon died on March 23, 2016, surrounded by family, according to an Instagram post by his son Jed Whedon.

== Awards and nominations ==
Date	Award	Category	Work	Shared with	Result
1973	Primetime Emmy Awards	Outstanding Achievement in Children's Programming - Entertainment/Fictional	The Electric Company	John Boni, Sara Compton, Tom Dunsmuir, Thad Mumford, Jeremy Stevens, and Jim Thurman	Won
1974	Daytime Emmy Awards	Outstanding Individual Achievement in Children's Programming	The Electric Company	John Boni, Sara Compton, Tom Dunsmuir, Thad Mumford, Jerry Stevens, and Jim Thurman	Nominated
1990	Primetime Emmy Awards	Outstanding Comedy Series	The Golden Girls	Paul Junger Witt, Tony Thomas, Susan Harris, Marc Sotkin, Terry Hughes, Phillip Jayson Lasker, Gail Parent, Martin Weiss, Robert Bruce, Tracy Gamble, and Richard Vaczy	Nominated
1991	Primetime Emmy Awards	Outstanding Comedy Series	The Golden Girls	Paul Junger Witt, Tony Thomas, Susan Harris, Mark Sotkin, Phillip Jayson Lasker, Gail Parent, Richard Vaczy, Tracy Gamble, Don Seigel, Jerry Perzigian, and Nina Feinberg	Nominated
