= Weedon =

Weedon may refer to:

== Places ==
=== England ===
- Weedon, Buckinghamshire, a village
- Weedon Bec, usually called Weedon, a village in Northamptonshire
  - Weedon railway station, a former railway station located outside of Weedon Bec
- Weedon, a locality in Newcastle-under-Lyme, Staffordshire

=== Other places ===
- Weedon, Quebec, a municipality in Canada
- Weedon Field, an airport near Eufaula, Alabama, US

== People ==
=== Surname ===
- Augustus Walford Weedon (1838–1908), English painter
- Basil Weedon (1923–2003), English chemist
- Bert Weedon (1920–2012), English guitarist and composer
- David Weedon (born 1942), Australian dermatopathologist
- George Weedon (general) (1734–1793), American soldier
- George Weedon (gymnast) (1920–2017), English gymnast
- Gerrick Weedon (born 1991), Australian rules footballer
- Harry Weedon (1887–1970), English architect
- Margaret Weedon (1853–1930), English archer

=== Given name ===
- Weedon Grossmith (1854–1919), English writer, playwright, actor and painter
- Weedon Osborne (1892–1918), American Navy officer and Medal of Honor recipient

=== Fictional characters ===
- Martin and Kate Weedon, an English couple in the British sitcom Benidorm

== See also ==
- Weedon Lois or Lois Weedon, a village in Weston and Weedon civil parish, near Towcester, Northamptonshire, England
- Weeden (disambiguation)
- Whedon (disambiguation)
