= Hey, Cinderella! =

- Cover of the 1983 VHS release by Muppet Home Video.
- Genre: Family film; Television special
- Created by: Jim Henson
- Written by: Jon Stone; Tom Whedon
- Directed by: Jim Henson
- Starring: Belinda Montgomery; Robin Ward; Pat Galloway; Joyce Gordon; Muppet performers: Jim Henson; Frank Oz; Jerry Nelson
- Theme music composer: Joe Raposo
- Countries of origin: Canada; United States

Production
- Producer: Peter Miner
- Editor: Stan Cole
- Running time: 52 minutes
- Production companies: Muppets, Inc.; Robert Lawrence Productions

Original release
- Network: CBC
- Release: March 16, 1969
- Network: ABC
- Release: April 10, 1970

Hey, Cinderella! is a 1969 television special adaptation of the fairy tale Cinderella, produced by Muppets, Inc. in the United States and Robert Lawrence Productions in Canada, and featuring The Muppets created by Jim Henson, who also directed the special. It was written by Jon Stone and Tom Whedon, and scored by the music composer of Sesame Street, Joe Raposo. It featured Kermit in his first appearance as a frog, as well as Goshposh and Rufus (from the Tales of the Tinkerdee and The Land of Tinkerdee pilots) and Splurge (the first full-bodied Muppet).

The one-hour special was first shown on the CBC on March 16, 1969, and on ABC on April 10, 1970. It was later re-aired in syndication, alongside The Muppet Show.

== Plot ==
The story follows Cinderella (Belinda Montgomery): a beautiful girl who is forced to do all the chores by her wicked stepmother and two stepsisters with only her dog Rufus to help her.

At the palace, King Goshposh (performed by Jim Henson) is bored and wishes to throw a party so that he may be given presents. As an excuse, he decides that his son Prince Arthur Charming (Robin Ward), ought to wed and use the ball as a means to find a suitable princess bride. Arthur does not like this arrangement and while gardening explains to his friend Kermit the Frog (also performed by Jim Henson) that every girl who knows him is a snob. His only hope to find an unsnobbish girl is to find a girl who does not recognize him as the prince.

Shortly after, Cinderella meets Arthur in the gardens as she is fulfilling a task given to her by her stepmother (to muddy her shoes, dirty the kitchen floor, and then scrub the floor). Seeing that Cinderella does not recognize him as the prince, he introduces himself as Arthur the gardener and secures an invitation for her by convincing his father to invite every person in the land to the ball rather than just the princesses (the king agrees, as it will get him more presents). Because the ball is a masquerade, Arthur and Cinderella decide to each wear a geranium as a means of recognizing each other.

The night of the ball, the stepfamily leave with a gift of old socks for the king. Cinderella is only allowed to attend if she finishes her chores, and finds a suitable dress, carriage, and coachman for the ball before the last minute (an impossible task, as she is told this at the last minute). When Cinderella dreams of attending the dance as well, her fairy godmother appears (who had been seen prior, attempting to turn a pumpkin into a coach as a magic trick, but gets pelted every time she fails). In a rare instance of her magic working, the fairy godmother provides Cinderella with a beautiful dress and glass slippers. She convinces Kermit to drive the carriage (though he refuses to turn human for it). It is pulled by his monster friend Splurge after he accidentally scares away all the horses. The fairy godmother warns Cinderella to be home by twelve and attends the ball as well, to make sure the deadline is met. Unfortunately, the King decided to give all guests a geranium to wear so Arthur and Cinderella are unable to recognize each other. When they dance, Cinderella knows Arthur only as "Prince Charming" and he knows her only as a mysterious maiden. At the stroke of midnight, the fairy godmother and Cinderella run from the palace leaving behind only one glass slipper which Arthur accidentally steps on and smashes.

Determined to force Arthur to marry the "mysterious maiden", the king first hires all his horses and men (a reference to Humpty Dumpty) to put the slipper back together and - when that is unsuccessful—look in all the unlikely places for the other one. Cinderella learns of this plan and though she realizes that she is the maiden they are searching for, she wishes to marry Arthur the gardener and not the prince. She convinces Rufus to bury the slipper, only for the prince to arrive and for Cinderella to realize that he and the gardener are the same person. She tries to explain that she's the mysterious princess, yet no one believes her. Finally, the fairy godmother appears, but in an attempt to turn Cinderella's rags back into the ball gown, Cinderella vanishes. In the meantime, Kermit and Splurge return the slipper. After a number of times, Cinderella appears in ball regalia, and she and the prince are finally married (with Kermit commenting that he could have solved the mystery much sooner, had he only been asked).

Afterwards, Kermit reads a personal invitation to Arthur and Cinderella's wedding, and finds he must bring a present for King Goshposh. After reading it, he remarks "How's that for a Happily ever after?" before jumping backwards into the well.

== Development ==
Hey, Cinderella! was originally conceived as a Snow White series by new CBS children's programming executive Fred Silverman, as a fallback option during contract negotiations with Captain Kangaroo's Bob Keeshan. Silverman brought in Jon Stone and Tom Whedon, whom he had worked with on the CBS Children's Film Festival, to write the pilot, and Jim Henson, who recommended using his Muppets over the realistic-looking animal puppets Stone and Whedon had envisioned in their original draft, as producer/director. When CBS re-signed Keeshan, development on Snow White halted, and Silverman gave Stone and Whedon permission to sell their pilot around.

After the writers got ABC's approval, the network insisted they change the story's heroine to Cinderella. The series idea got axed when ABC's Roone Arledge landed a Saturday NCAA college football game-of-the-week broadcast deal, requiring a revamp of their late morning/early afternoon Saturday schedule. The pilot was revised to a one-hour special, and Henson filmed it in Canada (At Robert Lawrence Studios in Toronto, Ontario) in the fall of 1968. This project was the first collaboration of future Sesame Street-ers Henson, Joe Raposo, and Stone. Hey Cinderella! was the first hour-long Muppet TV special.

== Cast ==
- Belinda Montgomery as Cinderella
- Robin Ward as Prince Arthur Charming
- Pat Galloway as Wicked Stepmother
- Joyce Gordon as Fairy Godmother

=== Muppet performers ===
- Jim Henson as Kermit the Frog, King Goshposh
- Jerry Nelson as Featherstone, Stepsister #2
- Frank Oz as Rufus, Stepsister #1, Splurge

== Songs ==
- "If I Could Go Dancing"

== Home media ==
- Muppet Home Video 1983 VHS, Beta and CED (distributed by Walt Disney Telecommunications and Non-Theatrical Company and RCA SelectaVision)
- Buena Vista Home Video 1994 VHS (Jim Henson Video)
