= Dr. Horrible's Sing-Along Blog =

2008 miniseries

- Genre: Musical; Comedy drama; Superhero
- Created by: Joss Whedon; Zack Whedon; Maurissa Tancharoen; Jed Whedon
- Written by: Joss Whedon; Zack Whedon; Maurissa Tancharoen; Jed Whedon
- Directed by: Joss Whedon
- Starring: Neil Patrick Harris; Nathan Fillion; Felicia Day; Simon Helberg
- Theme music composer: Joss Whedon; Jed Whedon
- Country of origin: United States
- Original language: English
- No. of episodes: 3

Production
- Producers: David M. Burns; Michael Boretz; Joss Whedon
- Cinematography: Ryan Green
- Editor: Lisa Lassek
- Running time: 42 minutes
- Production company: Mutant Enemy Productions

Original release
- Release: July 15 – July 20, 2008

Dr. Horrible's Sing-Along Blog is a 2008 musical comedy-drama miniseries made in three acts, produced exclusively for Internet distribution. Filmed and set in Los Angeles, the show tells the story of an aspiring supervillain named Dr. Horrible (Neil Patrick Harris), his nemesis Captain Hammer (Nathan Fillion), and a charity worker who is their shared love interest, Penny (Felicia Day).

The series was written by writer-director Joss Whedon, his brothers Zack Whedon and Jed Whedon, a television writer and a composer, respectively, and writer-actress Maurissa Tancharoen. The team wrote the musical during the 2007–2008 Writers Guild of America strike. The idea was to create something small and inexpensive, yet professionally done, in a way that would circumvent the issues that were being protested during the strike. Reception has been overwhelmingly positive. On October 31, 2008, Time magazine named it #15 in Time's Top 50 Inventions of 2008. It also won the People's Choice Award for "Favorite Online Sensation", and the 2009 Hugo Award for Best Dramatic Presentation, Short Form. In the inaugural 2009 Streamy Awards for web television, Dr. Horrible won seven awards: Audience Choice Award for Best Web Series, Best Directing for a Comedy Web Series, Best Writing for a Comedy Web Series, Best Male Actor in a Comedy Web Series (Harris), Best Editing, Best Cinematography, and Best Original Music. It also won a 2009 Creative Arts Emmy Award for Outstanding Special Class – Short-format Live-Action Entertainment Programs.

== Plot ==
Dr. Horrible's Sing-Along Blog consists of three acts of approximately 14 minutes each. They were first released online in July 2008 as individual episodes, with two-day intervals between each release.

Note: The following summary contains song titles in parentheses. These are the songs that are sung by the characters in the series.

=== Act I ===
Dr. Horrible films an entry for his video blog, giving updates on his schemes and responding to various emails from his viewers. Asked about the "her" that he often mentions, he launches into a song ("My Freeze Ray") about Penny, the girl he likes from the laundromat who only knows him as his civilian alter ego, Billy. Horrible's roommate, Moist, brings him a letter from Bad Horse, leader of the Evil League of Evil. The letter informs Dr. Horrible that his application for entry into the League will be evaluated based on his next heinous crime ("Bad Horse Chorus").

The following day, Horrible prepares to steal a case of wonderflonium for his time-stopping Freeze Ray by commandeering the courier van with his Horrible Van Remote, a remote-control device of his own making. Penny appears, asking him to sign a petition to turn a condemned city building into a homeless shelter ("Caring Hands"). However, the remote requires his attention, and he appears uninterested in her and her cause. As she leaves, Horrible is conflicted, but eventually opts to steal the wonderflonium instead of following Penny. Captain Hammer appears and smashes the remote's receiver, inadvertently causing the van to veer towards Penny, whom he manages to push out of the way, and into a pile of trash. Horrible eventually regains control of the van and stops it just in time, unfortunately making it appear that Captain Hammer stopped the van with his bare hands. Captain Hammer beats Dr. Horrible, then stops when Penny emerges from the trash to thank him. Horrible escapes with the wonderflonium, leaving the two as they serenade each other ("A Man's Gotta Do").

=== Act II ===
Dr. Horrible stalks Penny and Captain Hammer on their dates ("My Eyes"). At the laundromat, Penny befriends Billy, Horrible's alter ego. Horrible reveals in a blog that his Freeze Ray has been completed, and that he plans to use it the next day. The next blog after that, he reveals that he has failed, as Captain Hammer and the LAPD turned out to be watching his blogs. Bad Horse reprimands Horrible for his failure, saying that the only way to be inducted now is to commit an assassination ("Bad Horse Chorus (Reprise)"). Horrible agonizes over whether he's ready to commit murder.

Billy chats with Penny over frozen yogurt about their problems ("Penny's Song"). She motivates him to have hope, but Billy panics when Captain Hammer suddenly drops by to visit. He feigns ignorance on recognizing Hammer, but the moment Penny leaves, Hammer reveals that he knows Billy is Dr. Horrible. Hammer taunts Horrible about his crush on Penny and reveals that he only wants her so he can take her away from Horrible. Horrible finally gains the resolve to kill, in order to gain admission into the Evil League of Evil, and targets Captain Hammer ("Brand New Day").

=== Act III ===
Under Penny's influence, Captain Hammer launches a crusade to help the homeless and clean up the city's structural issues. Waiting at the laundromat for an absent Billy, Penny ponders her relationship with Hammer while Dr. Horrible goes into seclusion to turn his stun ray into a death ray ("So They Say"). At the opening for Penny's new homeless shelter, Captain Hammer makes a speech that degenerates into condescending self-praise ("Everyone's a Hero"). Penny, embarrassed and disillusioned, quietly tries to leave, but Horrible appears out of the red curtain that was supposed to conceal Hammer's statue. He renders Hammer motionless with his freeze ray, then taunts the shocked crowd and reveals his completed death ray ("Slipping"). He hesitates to kill Hammer, however, fearing what Penny will think if she witnesses it.

Hammer suddenly breaks free from his paralysis and punches Horrible across the room, damaging the death ray. He picks up the death ray and prepares to use it on Horrible, but the death ray explodes and causes Hammer to feel pain for the first time in his life. Wailing childishly, Hammer flees the scene. Horrible fears he has vanquished his nemesis without committing the murder required by the League, but then finds Penny fatally impaled by shrapnel from the exploding death ray. She recognizes him as Billy and dies in his arms, deliriously believing Captain Hammer will help them.

Horrible realizes that Penny's death counts as the required murder and the infamous act has made him a true villain. Captain Hammer is last seen sobbing on a therapist's couch. Horrible dons a new costume and attends a party to celebrate his induction into the League, taking his seat among other villains including Bad Horse, who is revealed to be an actual horse. He declares his intention to subjugate the world, but is shown in the last scene, out of costume as Billy, staring blankly into his blog camera in his basement, despondent ("Everything You Ever").

== Soundtrack ==
The musical contains 14 songs, including credits and reprises, but the song titles were not yet identified at the time of broadcast. The soundtrack was released through the iTunes Store on September 1, 2008 and was released on CD in the US on December 15, 2008.

Dr. Horrible's Sing-Along Blog Soundtrack made the top 40 Album list on release, despite being a digital exclusive only available on iTunes.

=== Musical numbers ===
Act I

- "Dr. Horrible Theme" – Instrumental
- "My Freeze Ray" – Dr. Horrible
- "Bad Horse Chorus" – Bad Horse Chorus
- "Caring Hands" – Penny
- "A Man's Gotta Do" – Dr. Horrible, Penny & Captain Hammer

Act II

- "Dr. Horrible Theme" – Instrumental
- "My Eyes" – Dr. Horrible & Penny
- "Bad Horse Chorus (Reprise)" – Bad Horse Chorus
- "Penny's Song" – Penny
- "Brand New Day" – Dr. Horrible

Act III

- "Dr. Horrible Theme" – Instrumental
- "So They Say" – Movers, Captain Hammer Groupies, Penny, Captain Hammer, News Anchors & Dr. Horrible
- "Everyone's a Hero" – Captain Hammer & Groupies
- "Slipping" – Dr. Horrible
- "Everything You Ever/Finale" – Dr. Horrible & Groupies
- "End Credits" – Instrumental

== Cast ==
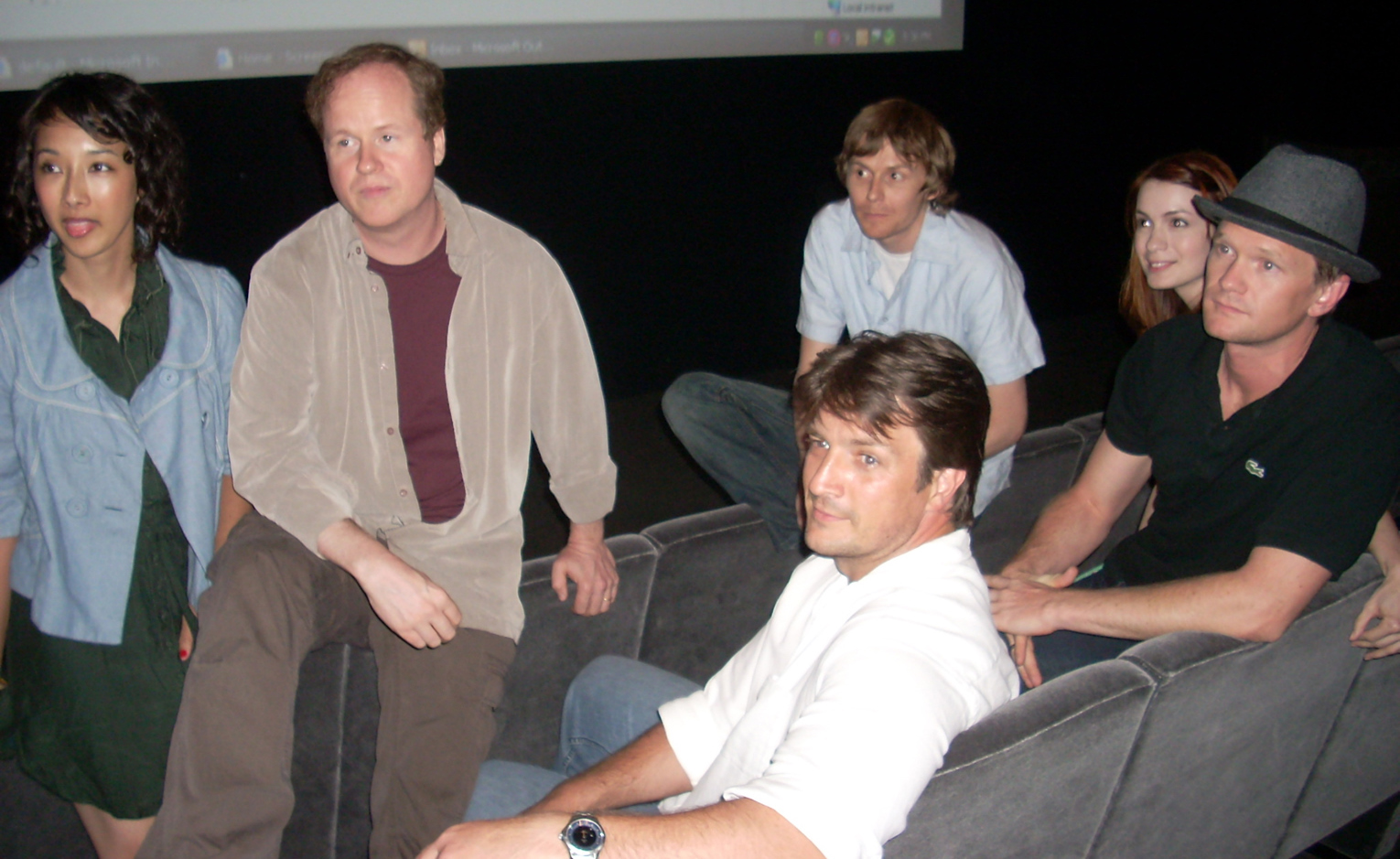
From left to right: Maurissa Tancharoen, Joss Whedon, Nathan Fillion, Jed Whedon, Felicia Day, Neil Patrick Harris

- Neil Patrick Harris as Billy/Dr. Horrible: An aspiring supervillain of the mad scientist variety with the catchphrase "I've got a Ph.D. in Horribleness". He desires to become a member of Bad Horse's Evil League of Evil. He uses his inventions to take over the world and enact social change for the betterment of humanity. His socio-political beliefs include the paradoxical idea of autocratic anarchy: "The world is a mess, and I just... need to rule it". As Billy, he struggles to make a romantic connection with Penny.
- Nathan Fillion as Captain Hammer: Dr. Horrible's archenemy, a superhero who possesses super-human strength and near-invulnerability. Hammer is self-centered and enjoys harassing Dr. Horrible even when the situation does not warrant it.
- Felicia Day as Penny: Dr. Horrible's love interest. Rising above a troubled past, she is idealistic, generous, and volunteers at a homeless shelter.
- Simon Helberg as Moist: Dr. Horrible's friend and sidekick, who has the underwhelming ability to dampen things. Dr. Horrible calls him "my evil moisture buddy".

Several colleagues of Joss Whedon have cameo roles in the series. Marti Noxon, an executive producer on Buffy the Vampire Slayer, portrays a newsreader alongside Buffy and Angel writer David Fury. Buffy and Angel writers Doug Petrie and Drew Goddard cameo as supervillains Professor Normal and Fake Thomas Jefferson, respectively. Jed, Joss, and Zack Whedon all provide the singing voices for the song Bad Horse Chorus. Zack also plays the man who rolls the gurney out of frame with Penny. Jed Whedon also appears as the supervillain Dead Bowie, while Maurissa Tancharoen, Steve Berg, and Stacy Shirk play superhero/supervillain groupies. Tancharoen also performs the background voice on the song Everything You Ever.

== Production ==
Joss Whedon funded the project himself (at just over $200,000) and enjoyed the independence of acting as his own studio. "Freedom is glorious," he comments. "And the fact is, I've had very good relationships with studios, and I've worked with a lot of smart executives. But there is a difference when you can just go ahead and do something." As a web show, there were fewer constraints imposed on the project, and Whedon had the "freedom to just let the dictates of the story say how long it's gonna be."

"We didn't have to cram everything in—there is a lot in there—but we put in the amount of story that we wanted to and let the time work around that. We aimed for thirty minutes, we came out at forty two, and that's not a problem." Some of the music was influenced by Stephen Sondheim.

The production of the DVD included a contest, announced at Comic-Con, in which fans submitted a three-minute video explaining why they should be inducted into the Evil League of Evil. Ten winning submissions have been added to the DVD release.

=== Recording locations ===
The songs were recorded in a small studio set up in Joss Whedon's loft. Dr. Horrible was shot in Los Angeles, with five locations on one soundstage, and one day of filming at the Universal Studios backlot street set, including the scenes of the van heist, and the giant Dr. Horrible crushing people beneath his feet. Dr. Horrible's home, used for blogging scenes as well as the final party scene, is the house featured in the "Mad Scientist House" episode of Monster House.

== Distribution ==
Whedon has said that the plan was to find a venue for the series that would enable it to earn its money back and pay the crew. This plan was to release the show onto the Internet, with an iTunes release to follow. If the Internet and iTunes releases were successful enough, Whedon planned to greenlight an official DVD, which would include some "amazing extras".

The musical's fansite launched in March 2008 (despite the official site containing nothing more than a poster at the time) and was the first place to publicly release the teaser trailer three months later on June 25, 2008.

=== Online ===
The episodes first aired at the Official Dr. Horrible website, hosted on Hulu, accessible internationally (surprising for a US-based service whose videos are typically not accessible to Internet users residing outside of the US) and free to watch (ad-supported). Act I premiered on Tuesday, July 15, 2008; Act II followed two days later on July 17; and Act III surfaced on July 19. The episodes were taken offline on July 20 as planned, but became available again on July 28. The show was later (date unknown) restricted to the United States only.

On October 10, 2009, all three acts were made available via iTunes for the UK and Australia. The film is also available on Amazon Video on Demand. On November 29, 2009, all three acts, both separate and together, were taken off Hulu. On February 22, 2010, the full feature became available to stream on Netflix, with all three episodes appearing sequentially. On March 20, 2014, it was removed from Netflix.

=== DVD and Blu-ray ===
On November 28, 2008, the Official Dr. Horrible website announced that pre-orders for the DVD were available. The following day, Tubefilter reported that pre-orders of the Dr. Horrible DVD were "booming".

The DVD was released exclusively at Amazon.com on December 19, 2008, in the United States and on January 13, 2009, in Canada at Amazon.ca.

The DVD is region free. During the span Dr. Horrible's pre-order season, the Amazon page stated that the discs would be manufactured on demand using recordable media. Although some customers have reported receiving DVD-R discs (identified by a purple data-side), most are receiving pressed discs.

On June 2, 2009, a new release of Dr. Horrible's Sing-Along Blog was produced by New Video Group, which included the same materials as the Amazon DVD but was distributed through regular retail outlets. A Blu-ray version was released on May 25, 2010, also from New Video Group.

Special features on the DVD and Blu-ray include Commentary! The Musical; commentary by the cast and creators; behind-the-scenes featurettes on the making of the movie and the music; the top 10 Evil League of Evil application videos from fans; and four easter eggs.

=== Commentary! The Musical ===
The DVD and Blu-ray versions of Dr. Horrible included Commentary! The Musical as an extra, which is a commentary track composed entirely of new songs performed by the cast and crew, becoming another whole musical on its own. The actors and writers sing various songs both as solos and with the entire company, playing versions of themselves. Commentary! is partly self-referential, and one of the co-creators, Zack Whedon, self-referentially comments that one song "wasn't even about the movie, it was about itself", which he claims is "like breaking the ninth wall". As of January 8, 2010, Commentary! The Musical has been up for sale on the iTunes Music Store.

Below is a list of the musical numbers in the Commentary! The Musical:

- "Commentary!" – Company
- "Strike" – Company
- "Ten-Dollar Solo" – Stacy Shirk (as Groupie #2), Neil Patrick Harris
- "Better (Than Neil)" – Nathan Fillion
- "It's All About the Art" – Felicia Day
- "Zack's Flavor" – Zack Whedon, female backups, Joss Whedon
- "Nobody Wants To Be Moist" – Simon Helberg (as Moist)
- "Ninja Ropes" – Jed Whedon, Neil Patrick Harris, Nathan Fillion
- "All About Me" – Extras
- "Nobody's Asian in the Movies" – Maurissa Tancharoen
- "Heart (Broken)" – Joss Whedon, backups (Jed Whedon, Zack Whedon, Maurissa Tancharoen)
- "Neil's Turn" – Neil Patrick Harris
- "Commentary! (Reprise)" – Company
- "Steve's Song" – Steve Berg

=== Profits ===
All proceeds from iTunes and DVD sales were dedicated to paying the cast and crew, who were not compensated at the time of production. In November 2008, Joss Whedon blogged about Dr. Horrible's Sing-Along Blog and stated that due to its success they had been able to pay the crew and the bills. Later, in 2012, Joss Whedon revealed during an interview with Forbes that with the movie, soundtrack and everything else that they’ve been able to do with their small budget of $200,000, they were able to make over $3 million with it.

=== Television broadcast ===
The three-part series made its television broadcast debut on October 9, 2012, airing at 9:00 pm on The CW. It was edited to fit the 42 minutes needed for a one-hour time slot.

== Comic books ==
Tie-in comic books for Dr. Horrible's Sing-Along Blog have been released by Dark Horse Comics. The first three were through its online comics anthology Dark Horse Presents, with the fourth being a special release as part of the "One Shot Wonders" series. All four comic books were written by Zack Whedon.

- "Captain Hammer: Be Like Me!" was released in issue #12 along with featured art by Eric Canete.
- "Moist: Humidity Rising" was released in issue #17 with art by Farel Dalrymple.
- "Penny: Keep Your Head Up" appears in issue #23 with art by Jim Rugg.
- "Dr. Horrible" was released as a special one-shot comic, detailing Dr. Horrible's origin story, with art by Joëlle Jones.

All four stories were put together in the collection Dr. Horrible, and Other Horrible Stories by Dark Horse Comics, in September 2010 (ISBN 978-1-59582-577-3). The collection also features an additional story about the Evil League of Evil.

In November 2018, a new comic written by Joss Whedon, entitled Dr. Horrible: Best Friends Forever, was released, with art done by Jose Maria Beroy and Sara Soler. The comic was the first story to be set after the events of the musical itself.

== Book ==
On March 29, 2011, Dr. Horrible's Sing-Along Blog Book (ISBN 978-1-84856-862-4) was published by Titan Books. The book contains essays by Whedon, Fillion, Harris, Day, and Helberg; the complete shooting script; the script for Commentary: The Musical; and piano/vocal sheet music for Dr. Horrible's Sing-Along Blog.

== Stage events ==
On August 29, 2008, the first authorized sing-along version of Dr. Horrible's Sing-Along Blog was hosted at Dragon Con in Atlanta, Georgia, with showings reaching standing-room-only capacity. Felicia Day attended one of the showings.

Stage productions of the show have become very popular at colleges and high schools.

In October 2010, Ireland, an official production of the musical was performed in Trinity College Dublin by the college's drama society, the DU Players. The show took place from October 25–29, 2010. In November 2010, Cult Classic Theatre in Glasgow, Scotland, performed the first official UK production of Dr. Horrible's Sing-Along Blog.

In January 2011, Balagan Theatre performed Dr. Horrible's Sing-Along Blog at the ACT Theatre's Allen Theatre in Seattle. The production was reviewed by Broadway World. A televised performance of a concert version of "Freeze Ray" can also be viewed. In 2011, all rights to perform Dr. Horrible's Sing-Along Blog or Commentary! The Musical were no longer being granted by the creators.

== Reception ==
=== Critical response ===
In a review for the Los Angeles Times, Robert Lloyd writes: "It is a sweet, rather sad piece that — like the songs, by Whedon and his brother Jed, which are at once mock-heroic and actually heroic, mock-moving and moving in fact — works both as parody and as a drama."

=== Awards ===
2009 Streamy Awards

- Audience Choice Award for Best Web Series
- Best Male Actor in a Comedy Web Series – Neil Patrick Harris
- Best Directing for a Comedy Web Series
- Best Writing for a Comedy Web Series

2009 Hugo Awards

- Best Dramatic Presentation, Short Form

2009 People's Choice Awards

- Best Internet Phenomenon Award

2009 Primetime Creative Arts Emmy Awards

- Outstanding Special Class – Short-format Live-Action Entertainment Programs

During the broadcast of the 2009 Primetime Emmy Awards ceremony, which was hosted by Harris, a speech by representatives of Ernst & Young was "interrupted" by a sketch featuring Harris as Dr. Horrible and Nathan Fillion as Captain Hammer, with cameos by Felicia Day and Simon Helberg.

=== Nominations ===
2008 Constellation Awards

- Best Science Fiction Film, TV Movie, or Mini-Series of 2008
- Best Male Performance in a 2008 Science Fiction Film, TV Movie, or Mini-Series (Neil Patrick Harris as Dr. Horrible)

=== Controversy ===
Fans of internet personality Doctor Steel, who had been performing under the name since 1999, noted similarities between Doctor Steel and Dr. Horrible, attracting the attention of national media. Dr. Horrible co-writer Maurissa Tancharoen responded, "All we have to say on the subject is we've never heard of Dr. Steel before... There's room for everyone in this party."

== Unproduced sequel ==
Since the series' release in 2008, there have been rumors of a sequel; however, it remains one of Joss Whedon's unrealized projects. In 2009, Joss Whedon announced at San Diego Comic-Con that a sequel was in the works and that it might be presented as either another web series or as a feature film. Nathan Fillion also said that he knew the title of the sequel, but was unwilling to reveal it at the time.

In an April 2011 interview in The New York Times, Whedon said "We've got several songs near completion and we've got a very specific structure," and that the cast of Dr. Horrible have sung the songs at casual gatherings.

While promoting Marvel Studios' The Avengers in March 2012, Whedon said he and the writers involved in Dr. Horrible would be working on writing the script during the 2012 summer. At San Diego Comic-Con in July, Whedon announced that he planned to shoot Dr. Horrible 2 by spring 2013. However, due to his commitment on Marvel's Agents of S.H.I.E.L.D. and Avengers: Age of Ultron, Whedon told E! News in an April 2013 interview that production on the sequel would be delayed.

In April 2015, Whedon stated in an update that "I was starting to feel like, I don't know if that's [possible]. Everybody's so busy, and we've all changed. I saw Neil do Hedwig [on Broadway], and went backstage, and the first thing he said was, 'When are we doing a sequel?!' I'm like, OK! Maybe that's still on! So it'll be interesting to see when we come up for air on it. Not sure. But God knows, we have the people. We have the technology. We can rebuild it."

In March 2019, Harris, while promoting the Netflix series A Series of Unfortunate Events, expressed his doubts on if a sequel to Dr. Horrible would ever happen stating "I have no information. I haven't seen Joss in ages and everyone's wonderfully busy with other things. So, unless the writers want to strike again, which is when we did the first one, I'm not sure when it would ever happen." Harris goes on to address his current age with "I'm no spring chicken. So, at a certain point, Dr. Horrible isn't Billy the Internet geeky kid anymore. I'm a grown man. So they'll probably have to cast Nick Jonas in it."
