= Stan Lee Meets... =

2006 Marvel comic book series

- Cover of the hardcover edition.

Publication information
- Publisher: Marvel Comics
- Format: Limited series
- Genre: Superhero
- Main character(s): Stan Lee; Spider-Man; Thing; Doctor Doom; Doctor Strange; Silver Surfer

Creative team
- Written by: Stan Lee

Stan Lee Meets... was a limited series published in 2006 by Marvel Comics in which comic book writer Stan Lee meets one of the characters he has created in each issue. The series was written by Stan Lee himself and was released to celebrate his 65th year as a Marvel Comics employee. The series is noted for its tongue-in-cheek humor and the comic book characters' general dislike of Stan Lee. Over the course of the five issues, Lee meets Spider-Man, the Thing, Doctor Doom, Doctor Strange and the Silver Surfer. Each issue also contained reprints of issues from each character's respective comic. A special issue in which Lee meets Professor X and Magneto (X-Men: The Unlikely Saga of Xavier, Magneto and Stan) was included with the DVD edition of X-Men: The Last Stand.
