= John Whedon =

American screenwriter (1905–1991)

- Born: John Ogden Whedon; November 5, 1905; Medford, Oregon, U.S.
- Died: November 21, 1991 (aged 86); Medford, Oregon, U.S.
- Occupation: Screenwriter
- Spouse: Louise Carroll Angell
- Children: 2, including Tom
- Relatives: Joss Whedon (grandson); Jed Whedon (grandson); Zack Whedon (grandson)

John Ogden Whedon (November 5, 1905 – November 22, 1991) was an American screenwriter. He is best known for his writing for the television series The Donna Reed Show during the 1950s. Whedon also wrote for The Great Gildersleeve on radio, The Andy Griffith Show, The Dick Van Dyke Show, That Girl and Leave It to Beaver.

He and wife, Louise Carroll Angell, had two children: Tom (a television screenwriter) and Julia. John and Louise's grandsons were Joss, Jed and Zack Whedon.

== Death ==
Whedon died in Medford, Oregon on November 22, 1991, aged 86. He is buried in East Cemetery, Litchfield County, Connecticut.
