= Joss Whedon =

American filmmaker, comic book writer, and composer (born 1964)

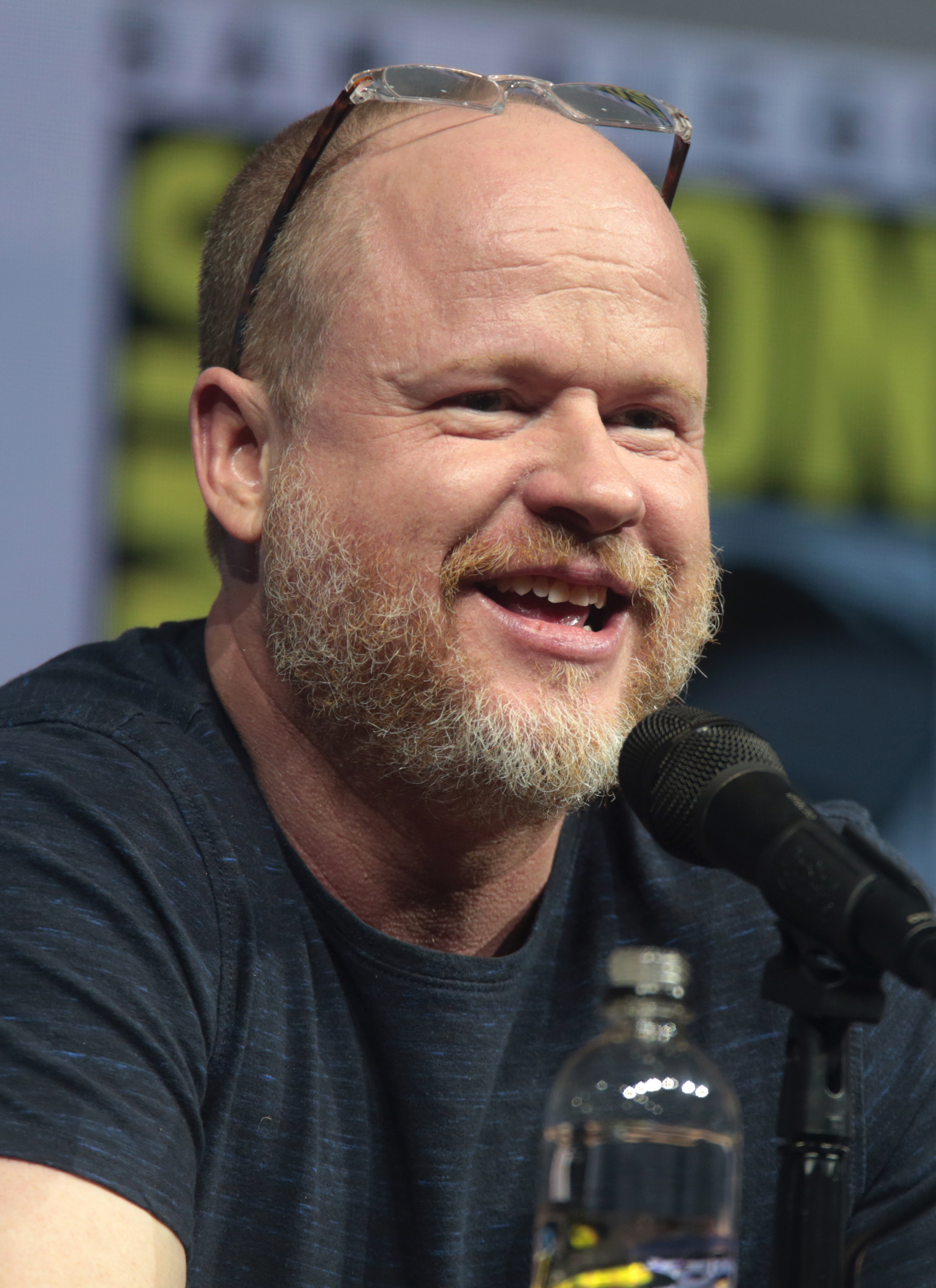
- Whedon at the 2018 San Diego Comic-Con
- Born: Joseph Hill Whedon; June 23, 1964 (age 62); New York City, U.S.
- Education: Wesleyan University
- Occupations: Director; producer; screenwriter; composer; comic book writer; film editor
- Years active: 1989–present
- Works: Filmography
- Style: Science fiction; action; comedy drama; superhero fiction; horror fiction; philosophical fiction
- Title: Founder of Mutant Enemy Productions; Co-founder of Bellwether Pictures
- Spouses: Kai Cole (m. 1995; div. 2016); Heather Horton (m. 2021)
- Children: 2
- Father: Tom Whedon
- Relatives: John Whedon (grandfather); Jed Whedon (half-brother); Zack Whedon (half-brother)
- Joss Whedon's voice from the BBC programme Front Row, December 26, 2013.

Joseph Hill "Joss" Whedon (/ˈwiːdən/ WEE-dən; born June 23, 1964) is an American filmmaker, comic book writer, and composer. He is best known as the creator of supernatural drama Buffy the Vampire Slayer (1997–2003) and its spinoff Angel (1999–2004), short-lived space Western Firefly (2002), the Internet musical miniseries Dr. Horrible's Sing-Along Blog (2008), the science fiction drama Dollhouse (2009–2010), the Marvel Cinematic Universe films The Avengers (2012) and Avengers: Age of Ultron (2015) and series Agents of S.H.I.E.L.D. (2013–2020), and the science fiction drama The Nevers (2021).

After beginning his career in sitcoms, Whedon wrote the poorly received horror comedy film Buffy the Vampire Slayer (1992) – which he later adapted into the acclaimed television series of the same name – co-wrote the Pixar animated film Toy Story (1995), and wrote the science fiction horror film Alien Resurrection (1997). After achieving success as a television showrunner, Whedon returned to film to write and direct the Firefly film continuation Serenity (2005), to co-write and produce the horror comedy film The Cabin in the Woods (2012), and to write and direct the Shakespeare adaptation Much Ado About Nothing (2012). For the Marvel Cinematic Universe, Whedon wrote and directed the ensemble superhero film The Avengers (2012) and its sequel Avengers: Age of Ultron (2015). He also co-wrote the DC Extended Universe superhero film Justice League (2017), for which he also served as director for re-shoots, replacing Zack Snyder (who retained directorial credit).

Whedon has also worked as a composer (notably for the Buffy the Vampire Slayer musical episode "Once More, with Feeling" and Dr. Horrible's Sing-Along Blog) and comic book writer, both for comic book continuations of television series he created and for established franchises, such as Astonishing X-Men.

Beginning in July 2020, multiple actors, producers, and writers have spoken out against Whedon about the toxic workplace environments he had allegedly created in many of his projects. Whedon has denied any wrongdoing, while acknowledging that he can be "confrontational".

== Early life ==
Born on June 23, 1964, in New York City and raised on the Upper West Side as Joseph Hill Whedon, (Note: His first name was changed to "Joss" once he broke into the writing industry.) he would later become a third-generation TV writer as a son of Tom Whedon, a screenwriter for Alice in the 1970s and The Golden Girls in the 1980s, and a grandson of John Whedon, who worked on The Donna Reed Show in the 1950s and The Dick Van Dyke Show and That Girl in the 1960s, as well as writing for radio shows such as The Great Gildersleeve. His mother, Ann Lee (née Jeffries) Stearns, originally from Kentucky, was an activist and a teacher at Riverdale Country School as Lee Whedon, in addition to being an aspiring novelist. Jessica Neuwirth, a former student of Stearns, has often cited her as her inspiration, describing her as a "visionary feminist". His parents both acted, appearing in a play together at the Harvard Radcliffe Dramatic Club. The family would spend vacations reciting Shakespeare.

Whedon is the younger sibling of Samuel and Matthew Whedon and the older sibling of writers Jed and Zack Whedon. Whedon stated that his parents expected constant creativity from their children and were often verbally demeaning and gave them the silent treatment if he and his brothers were not amusing or entertaining, or if they simply disagreed with them. He stated, however, that he was more afraid of his older brothers who constantly bullied him. At the age of 5, a friend (age 4) died by drowning in a pond on the Whedons' upstate property. His parents divorced when he was 9. Whedon cited his childhood trauma as having a direct influence in his relationships, addictions and behaviors into adulthood and has stated that he suffers from complex post traumatic stress disorder.

At a young age, he showed great interest in British television series shows like Masterpiece and comedy group Monty Python. Whedon attended Riverdale Country School in New York City where his mother taught history. Starting at age 15, he spent three years at Winchester College, a boarding school in England. There, taking note of omnipresent bullying, he concluded, "it was clear to me from the start that I must take an active role in my survival". Whedon graduated from Wesleyan University in 1987, where he was awarded an honorary Doctor of Letters in 2013. There, he also studied under renowned academic Richard Slotkin. It was at Wesleyan he would meet Jeanine Basinger, a film scholar who became his mentor. After leaving Wesleyan, Whedon conceived the first incarnation of Buffy Summers, "Rhonda, the Immortal Waitress".

== Career ==
=== 1980s–1990s ===
==== Early work ====
From 1989 to 1990, Whedon worked as a staff writer on the sitcoms Roseanne and Parenthood. As a script doctor, Whedon was an uncredited writer on films including The Getaway, Speed, Waterworld, and Twister. Whedon worked on an early draft of X-Men which subsequently contained at least two of his contributions to dialogue exchanges, while the final cut of Speed retained most of his dialogue. While he was script consulting, he also wrote Buffy the Vampire Slayer (the film that would precede the series), Alien Resurrection and early drafts for Titan A.E. and Atlantis: The Lost Empire – but would subsequently express strong dissatisfaction with the released versions of the first three of these films. He co-wrote Toy Story, which earned him a shared Academy Award nomination for Best Original Screenplay. He became one of the highest paid screenwriters when he sold his Afterlife script to Columbia Pictures for $1.5 million.

==== Buffy the Vampire Slayer ====
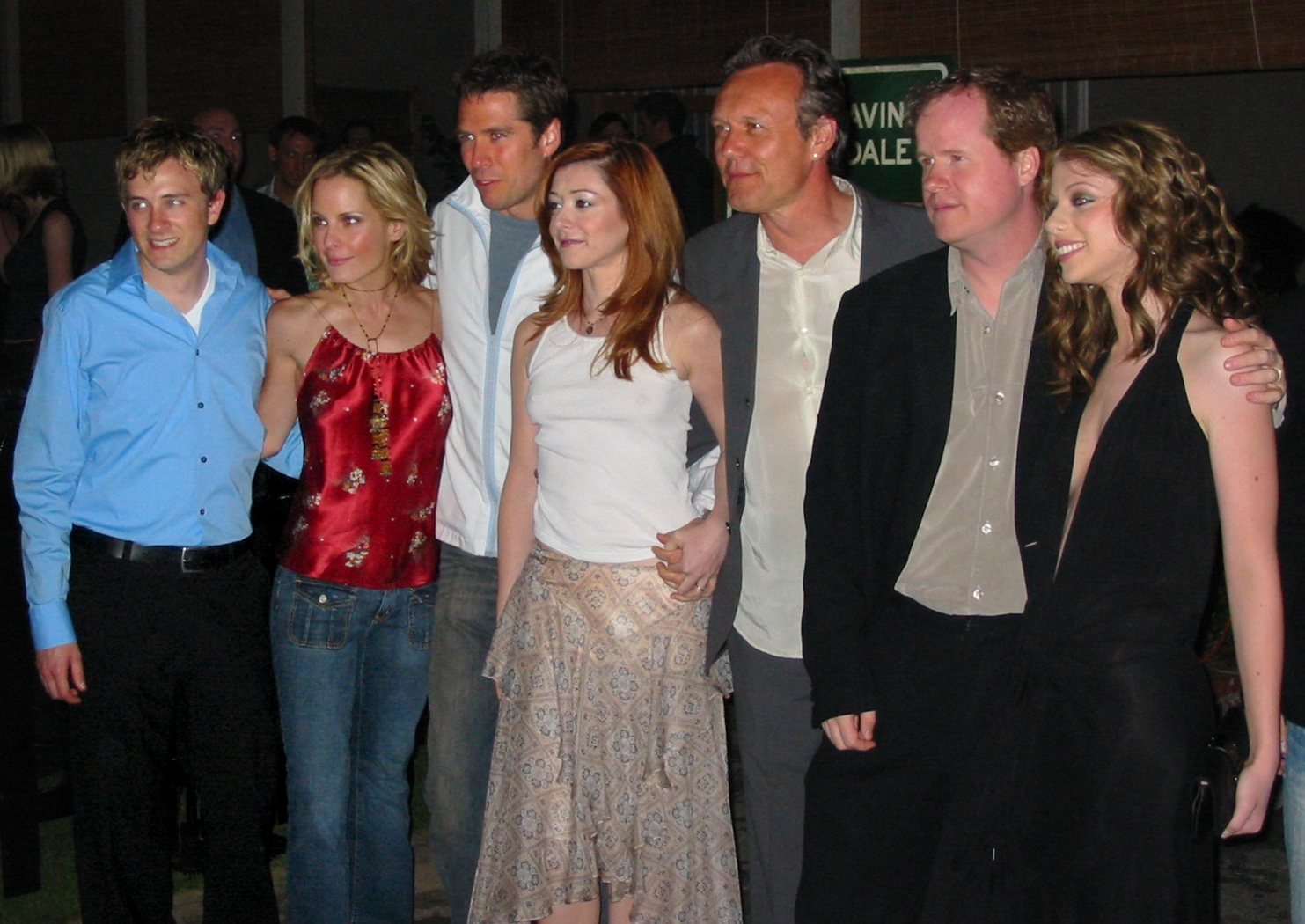
(From left to right) Tom Lenk, Emma Caulfield, Alexis Denisof, Alyson Hannigan, Anthony Head, Whedon and Michelle Trachtenberg at the Buffy wrap party

In 1997, Whedon created his first television series, Buffy the Vampire Slayer. (Note: Sandollar Productions acquired the television rights to the 1992 film, and in the mid-1990s, executive Gail Berman approached Whedon to adapt it as a series based on the success of Clueless.) The series depicts Buffy Summers, the latest in a line of young women called to battle against vampires, demons, and other forces of darkness. The idea came directly from his aversion to seeing the Hollywood formula of "the little blonde girl who goes into a dark alley and gets killed in every horror movie". Whedon said he wanted to subvert the idea and create someone who was a hero. This conception came from "the very first mission statement of the show, which was the joy of female power: having it, using it, sharing it". The writing process came together from conversations about the emotional issues facing Buffy Summers, and how she would confront them in her battle against supernatural forces. Whedon usually directed episodes from his own scripts that held the most cathartic moments in Buffy's story.

The series received numerous awards and nominations, including an Emmy Award nomination for writing for the 1999 episode "Hush". The 2001 episode "The Body" was nominated for a Nebula Award in 2002, and the fall 2001 musical episode "Once More, with Feeling" was nominated for a Best Dramatic Presentation Hugo Award and a Best Script Nebula Award. The final episode "Chosen" was nominated for a Best Dramatic Presentation, Short Form Hugo Award in 2003. All written and directed by Whedon, they are considered some of the most effective and popular episodes of the series.

A. Asbjørn Jøn, an anthropologist and scholar, recognized that the series has shifted the way vampires have since been depicted in popular culture representations. Since the end of the series, Whedon has stated that his initial intention was to produce a "cult" television series and acknowledged a corresponding "rabid, almost insane fan base" that subsequently emerged. In June 2012, Slate identified it as the most written about popular culture text of all time. "[M]ore than twice as many papers, essays, and books have been devoted to the vampire drama than any of our other choices—so many that we stopped counting when we hit 200".

Whedon, a lifelong comic book fan, authored the Dark Horse Comics miniseries Fray, which takes place in the far future of the Buffyverse. Like many writers of the show, he contributed to the series' comic book continuation, writing for the anthology Tales of the Slayers, and also for the main storyline of the miniseries Tales of the Vampires. Whedon and the other writers released a new ongoing series, taking place after the series finale "Chosen", which he officially recognizes as the canonical eighth season. He returned to the world of Fray during the season eight-story arc "Time of Your Life". Buffy the Vampire Slayer Season Nine was published from August 2011 to September 2013, for which Whedon wrote "Freefall, Part I–II" (with Andrew Chambliss).

==== Angel ====
As a result of the success of Buffy the Vampire Slayer, Whedon was given the opportunity to make Angel, his 1999 spin-off series of the show. David Greenwalt and Whedon collaborated on the pilot which was going to be developed for The WB Network. During the series' early expansion, efforts were made by the network to mitigate Whedon's original concept. "Corrupt", a precociously optioned second episode, was entirely abandoned due to the gloominess written into the script. The tone was then softened in the opening episodes, establishing Angel Investigations as an idealistic, shoestring operation. It follows Angel, who works as a private detective in order to "help the helpless".

Though praised for presenting a unique and progressive version of the archetypal noir hero as a sympathetic vampire detective, early in its run it was criticized as being lesser than its parent show, in the context of having devolved from a more popular original work. Despite that, it won a Saturn Award for Best Network TV Series and three episodes, "Waiting in the Wings", "Smile Time" and "Not Fade Away", were nominated for Hugo Awards for Best Dramatic Presentation, Short Form in 2003 and 2005.

The WB Network announced on February 13, 2004, that Angel would not be brought back for a sixth season. Whedon said of the cancellation, "I believe the reason Angel had trouble on The WB was that it was the only show on the network that wasn't trying to be Buffy. It was a show about grown-ups". An official continuation of the story came later in the form of a comic book series. Following the successful eighth season of Buffy the Vampire Slayer, IDW Publishing approached Whedon about similarly producing a canonical sixth season for Angel. Angel: After the Fall released 17 issues written by Whedon and Brian Lynch.

=== 2000s ===
==== Firefly ====
Whedon followed Angel with the space western Firefly, starring Nathan Fillion, Gina Torres, Alan Tudyk, Morena Baccarin, Adam Baldwin, Jewel Staite, Sean Maher, Summer Glau and Ron Glass. Set in the year 2517, Firefly explores the lives of the people who while on the outskirts of society, make their living as the crew of Serenity, a "Firefly-class" spaceship. The series' original concept progressed after Whedon read The Killer Angels, a book on the Battle of Gettysburg.

An ever-present element was Whedon's injection of anti-totalitarianism, writing into the show a historical analogy of the Battle of Gettysburg, the "Battle of Serenity Valley". (Note: In the Battle of Serenity Valley, the Independents were defeated by The Alliance, an authoritarian regime.) The beaten soldiers were called "Browncoats" after the brown dusters they wore as their uniforms. Whedon said, "I wanted to play with that classic notion of the frontier: not the people who made history, but the people history stepped on—the people for whom every act is the creation of civilization". Firefly was written as a serious character study, encompassing what Whedon called "life when it's hard". He went on to elaborate that it was about "nine people looking into the blackness of space and seeing nine different things".

Fox chose to play the episodes of the series out of order, running "The Train Job" first, and not airing the pilot until a dozen episodes later, resulting in some confusion from viewers. The series was also promoted as a comedy, not a science fiction drama, and placed in the infamous "Friday night death slot". The show was praised by critics overall, but some objected to the fusion of American frontier and outer space motifs. Faced with these hurdles, the show had an average of 4.7 million viewers at the time and was ranked 98th in Nielsen ratings. The series was cancelled by Fox before all of the episodes had aired. Whedon took to Universal Pictures as a means of achieving a continuation of the story. Following Firefly was Serenity, a follow-up film taking place after the events of the final episode. Serenity developed into a franchise that led to graphic novels, books and other media. New Scientist magazine held a poll in 2005 to find "The World's Best Space Sci-Fi Ever", and Firefly and Serenity took first and second place, respectively. It also received an Emmy shortly after its cancellation, as well as a number of other awards. Since being canceled, Firefly has attained cult status.

==== Marvel Comics ====
In 2004, Whedon created the comic book line Astonishing X-Men. He finished a 24 issue run in 2008 and then handed over the reins as a writer to Warren Ellis. One storyline from the comic, the notion of a cure for mutation being found, was also an element in the third X-Men film, X-Men: The Last Stand. In February 2009 Astonishing X-Men #6, which depicted the return of Colossus to the title and concluded Whedon's first story arc, was named by readers as #65 in Marvel's Top 70 Comics of all time.

Taking over after series creator Brian K. Vaughan completed his run on the series, Whedon became the second writer of the Marvel comic Runaways. Having already been a committed reader, he had a letter published in the first volume, which was included in the Volume 1 hardcover edition. He also wrote short pieces for Stan Lee Meets Spider-Man and Giant-Size Astonishing X-Men #1, and he was the subject of an issue of the comic book, Marvel Spotlight (alongside artist Michael Lark). As part of a panel of writers, he contributed to Marvel Comics' Civil War crossover event lending advice on how to tell the story and also how to end it. In March 2016, Whedon contributed a story for the 75th anniversary issue of Captain America: Sam Wilson with Astonishing X-Men collaborator John Cassaday. He introduced several new characters into the Marvel Universe such as the villainous Ord, X-Men Ruth "Blindfold" Aldine and Hisako "Armor" Ichiki, Runaway Klara Prast, and Special Agent Abigail Brand along with S.W.O.R.D., the organization Brand commands.

==== Serenity ====
After Universal Pictures acquired the film and distribution rights from Fox, Whedon began writing the screenplay for Serenity. Transforming the series into a film, he says, "... was the hardest piece of writing I've ever done ... It had to be self-contained and work as a movie, which meant I had to cope with problems like introducing nine main characters who'd already met!" The script was based on unused story ideas for Firefly's unfilmed second season. On writing the dialogue, Whedon felt that part of it came from "getting to invent the language", which "once I had... reads like a kind of poetry". The narrative centered on Captain Malcolm Reynolds as the hero accompanied by River Tam acting as the catalyst for what he does.

The score was composed by David Newman, and according to Whedon was intended to "deglorify space — to feel the intimacy of being on a ship as opposed to the grandeur". He used two long steadicam shots for several minutes of the film's opening sequence to establish "a sense of safety in space". In 2006, it won a Hugo Award for Best Dramatic Presentation, Long Form. The elements of science fiction that Whedon wanted to convey were essentially different in kind, and held "a sort of grittiness" and "realism", which he said, together, "get the most exciting kind of film-making". Critic Roger Ebert observed, "Like Brave New World and 1984, the movie plays like a critique of contemporary society, with the Alliance as Big Brother, enemy of discontent". The film received the 2005 Nebula Award for Best Script, the 2006 Prometheus Special Award, and was voted the best sci-fi movie of all time in a poll set up by SFX magazine. There have since been multiple rumors regarding sequel possibilities, though these rumors were shut down by those involved in Serenity in 2025.

The limited three-issue comic book series called Serenity: Those Left Behind, the story of which was written by Whedon, was released in 2005 as a tie-in to Serenity. Set between Firefly and the film, it was intended to connect the two storylines. Serenity: Better Days also spanned three issues and was written by Whedon and Brett Matthews. Whedon later co-wrote The Shepherd's Tale with his half-brother Zack.

==== Freelance directing and Sugarshock! ====
As a guest director, he contributed two 2007 episodes of The Office ("Business School" and "Branch Wars") and a 2010 episode of Glee ("Dream On"). Denoting this period, Whedon has said, "I had free time, but I'm pretty sure I mean my career was on the skids".

In collaboration with Fábio Moon, Whedon created the free webcomic titled Sugarshock!, as part of the revival of Dark Horse Presents, which was launched on Myspace. Whedon later executive produced another free comic book on the Internet, Serenity: The Other Half.

==== Dr. Horrible's Sing-Along Blog ====
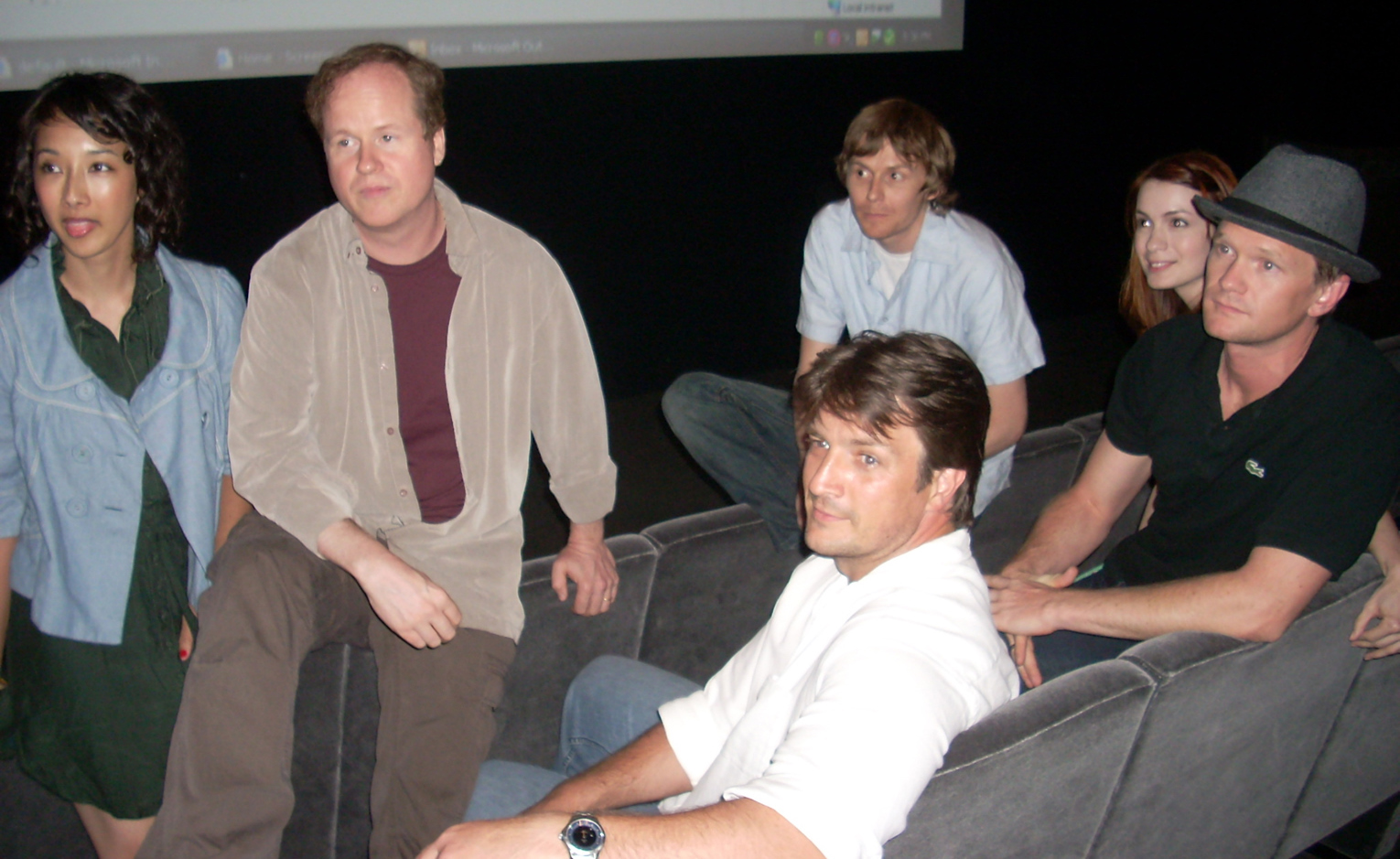
Whedon with the cast and crew of Dr. Horrible's Sing-Along Blog at its Creative Artists Agency theater screening

As a response to the 2007–08 Writers Guild of America strike, Whedon directed, co-wrote and produced Dr. Horrible's Sing-Along Blog. It tells the story of Dr. Horrible, an aspiring supervillain, who shares a love interest in a girl named Penny with his nemesis, Captain Hammer. To Whedon the miniseries was "a project of love", an accomplishment that from their excitement would be embellished with passion and "ridiculousness". His half-brothers Zack and Jed and sister-in-law Maurissa Tancharoen share the other writing credits. Whedon said it was a "glorious surprise" to him to discover how well they worked together.

After having attended meetings with companies discussing the prospect of producing something for the Internet and faced with negative feedback on his ideas, he realized that as long as the strike was still in progress, acquiring corporate funding was an unlikely prospect. Whedon himself funded the project investing just over $200,000 and earned more from it than he did directing The Avengers. He enjoyed the independence he gained from Dr. Horrible's Sing-Along Blog as it provided him the freedom to include content without the expectancy of lessening it on behalf of the runtime. He and Jed composed the music, parts of which were influenced by Stephen Sondheim.

The miniseries was nominated and won numerous awards. Whedon was awarded Best Directing and Best Writing for a Comedy Web Series at the Streamy Awards, a Hugo Award for Best Dramatic Presentation, Short Form, and a Creative Arts Emmy Award in 2009.

==== Dollhouse ====
In 2009, Whedon created his fourth television series, Dollhouse, and explored themes throughout the show that were initially present in an unproduced spec script of his called Afterlife. The series follows Echo, whose brain is programmed to accomplish various assignments, on her journey towards self-awareness. As stated by Whedon, Dollhouse was about "the sides of us that we don't want people to see", sexuality and, on some level, a celebration of perversion, which he equates to obsession, "the thing that makes people passionate and interesting and worthy".

Despite low ratings in its first season, the series was renewed for a second and final season. The reason for the renewal given by Fox's president of entertainment was to avoid any backlash that would have resulted from its cancelation. In reflection of Fox's disruptive involvement, Whedon lamented the loss of ideas with identity and moral culpability, saying they were dancing around them in the process which then devolved the series into a procedural show.

=== 2010s ===
==== The Cabin in the Woods ====
Whedon co-wrote and produced a horror-comedy film titled The Cabin in the Woods with director Drew Goddard, finishing production in 2009 though the film was not released until 2011. Whedon and Goddard intended to make a film that exemplified horror movies while still preserving the fun and frightening elements necessary to being a horror film. The script was written in three days and they produced a minimum of 15 pages a day. Whedon described it as an attempt to revitalize horror, calling it a "loving hate letter" to the genre, continuing:

On another level it's a serious critique of what we love and what we don't about horror movies. I love being scared. I love that mixture of thrill, of horror, that objectification/identification thing of wanting definitely for the people to be alright but at the same time hoping they'll go somewhere dark and face something awful. The things that I don't like are kids acting like idiots, the devolution of the horror movie into torture porn and into a long series of sadistic comeuppances. Drew and I both felt that the pendulum had swung a little too far in that direction.

Whedon thought part of what distinguished it from other horror films was that people were not disposable – "As a culture, for our own entertainment, we tend to assume that they are (expendable)". He reiterated a sentiment that the introduction of torture porn into this genre was becoming an exercise in nihilism and misogyny as a means to promote distress and instead of trying to scare its audience.

==== Marvel Studios ====
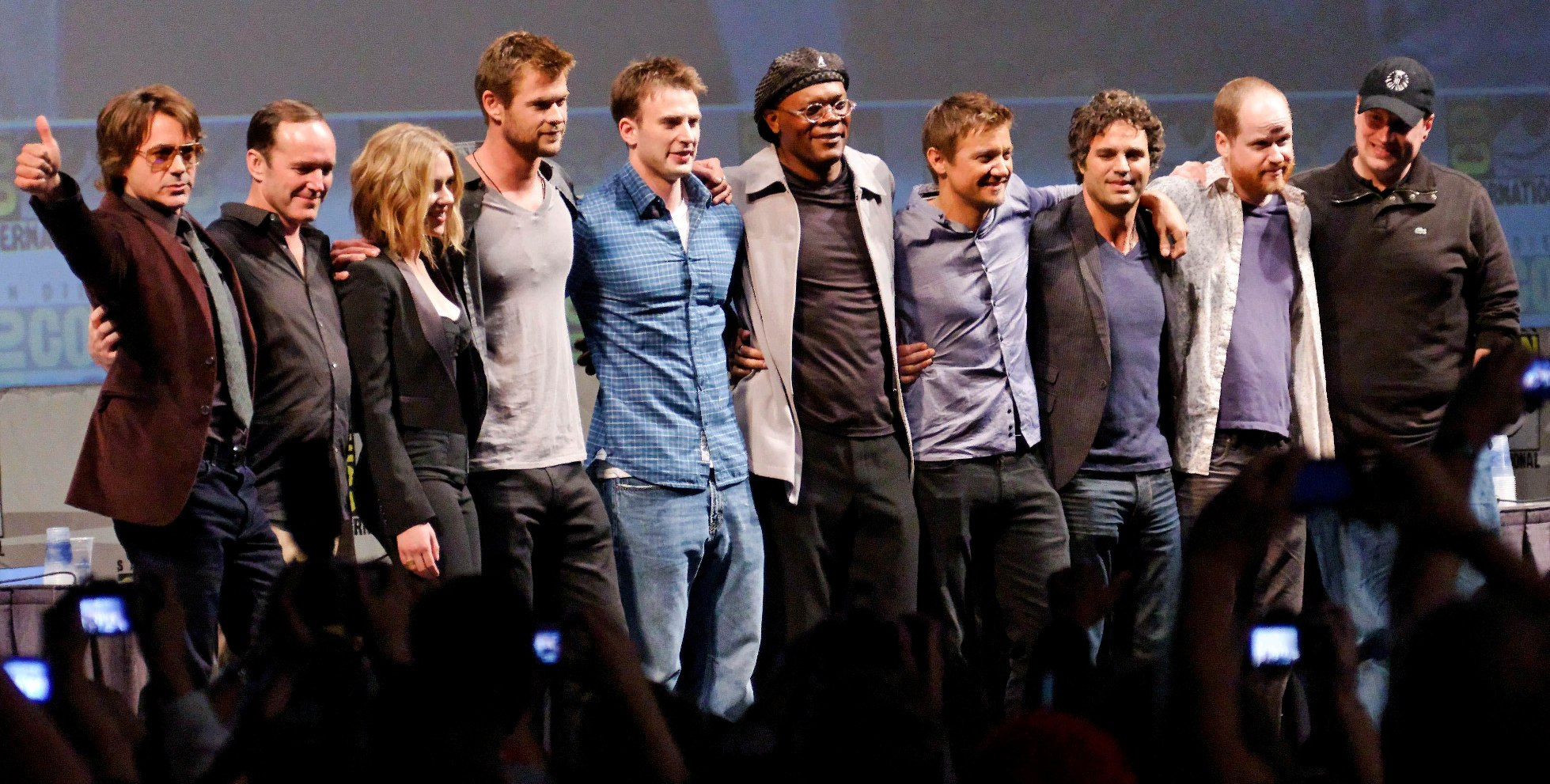
Whedon with the cast of The Avengers and Kevin Feige at the 2010 San Diego Comic-Con

In July 2010, it was confirmed that Whedon would write and direct The Avengers, a live-action adaptation of the superhero team of the same name. Of his desire to take on the film, he explained that the core of the movie was about "finding yourself from community" and the togetherness derived from a group that ultimately doesn't belong together.

It became the third-highest-grossing film of all time at the North American box office back in 2012, and it received considerable praise from critics. In retrospect, Whedon thought the film had "imperfections", begrudging its quality in comparison to that of The Matrix and The Godfather Part II. Nonetheless, he felt he "pulled off" the endeavor of making a summer movie reminiscent of those from his childhood.

In March 2012, Whedon stated that although television involves more compromise than film:

I think, ultimately, gun to my head, TV is the place. Being able to spend years with a character, to really develop them, to understand them, to challenge the actor, to learn from the actor, to work with a team of writers – that experience is so fulfilling. The idea of putting something out there and letting it grow is really exciting.

In August 2012, Whedon signed a deal to develop the Marvel TV show Agents of S.H.I.E.L.D. for ABC. The series focuses on the secret military law-enforcement agency featured throughout the Marvel Cinematic Universe. Created by Whedon, Jed Whedon and Maurissa Tancharoen, the show involves individuals who possess powers within the spectacle of science fiction, while also focusing on "the peripheral people ... the people on the edges of the grand adventures." The character Phil Coulson was resurrected after his death in The Avengers to helm the show.

Whedon spoke about certain complications that factored in with making the show for Marvel, noting confusion between him and the company regarding the degree to which they wanted him to create it, citing their demand that he prioritize Avengers: Age of Ultron. He once expressed regrets for having brought back Phil Coulson, feeling that his death had lost meaning as a result, but later clarified that he did not regret this decision.

Whedon returned to write and direct the sequel to The Avengers, Avengers: Age of Ultron, following the deal with Marvel Studios, which expired in June 2015. On the matter of approaching a sequel, Whedon reasoned not to go "bigger" but "deeper", and likened it to digging with a scalpel to cause pain. He said of the film's characters, "Strong but damaged by power describes every person in this movie. It may, in fact, describe what the movie is about ... the more power that we have, the less human we are." Whedon discerns that Age of Ultron "is an odd film" that proved challenging when it came to finding the rhythm between both its calm and exciting moments. Drawing parallels to a symphony, he wanted to bring about "grace in the middle of ultimate chaos".

Whedon also served as a creative consultant on the films in the Marvel Cinematic Universe leading up to Age of Ultron. He rewrote some dialogue for Thor: The Dark World, directed the mid-credits scene of Captain America: The Winter Soldier, and suggested that James Gunn make Guardians of the Galaxy "weirder" after reading an early draft. Whedon said it was unlikely that he would return to make another sequel, stating that he "couldn't imagine doing this again". He remarked that not having created his own fictional universe in over five years felt wrong and intended to use the proceeds made from Avengers: Age of Ultron for such ventures. In January 2016, Whedon announced that he would no longer work with Marvel. Marvel Studios CEO Kevin Feige would be cited in MCU: The Reign of Marvel Studios, released in October 2023, that he would never work again with Whedon.

==== Much Ado About Nothing ====
To create Much Ado About Nothing in 2012, Whedon established Bellwether Pictures. He filmed it in black-and-white on digital video over a period of 12 days at his residence in Santa Monica, California. The film was scripted, produced, directed, edited and composed by Whedon, based on William Shakespeare's play of the same name. His idea to adapt the play for the screen originated from having "Shakespeare readings" at his house with several of his friends, years prior. Despite the play's comedy, he discovered that there were elements in the text "of debauchery" that brought out a core darkness, and said the visual nature of film influenced him to permeate a motif of sexuality into the script.

==== In Your Eyes and Twist ====
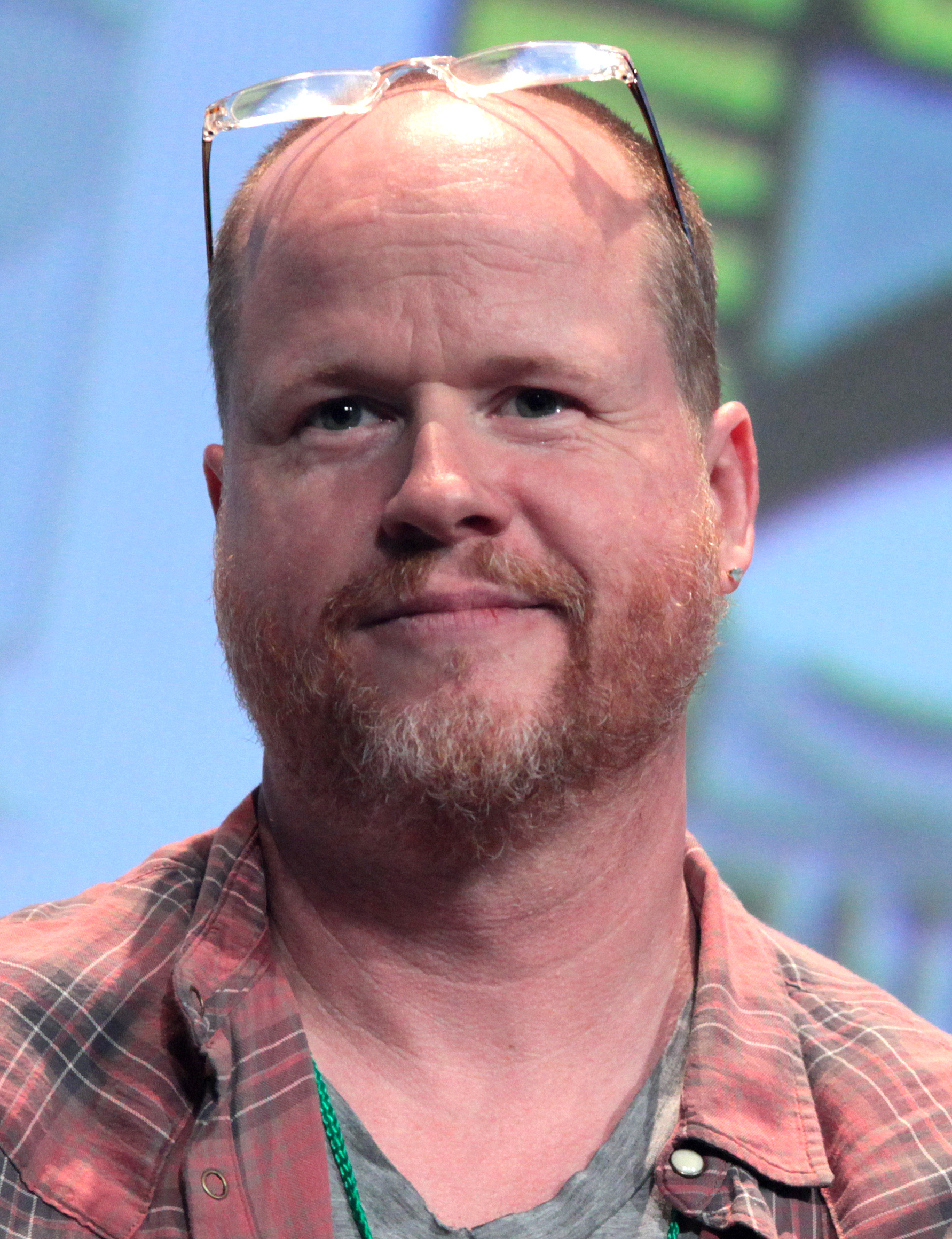
Whedon at the 2015 San Diego Comic-Con

Whedon wrote and executive produced the paranormal romance film In Your Eyes, the second feature by Bellwether Pictures. The film tells the story of Rebecca Porter and Dylan Kershaw, who can feel each other's emotions but are ultimately strangers. Whedon's script marked a theme of human connection as the metaphor for the couple's mysterious link. He conceived the idea in the early 1990s, and had written drafts of the screenplay since then.

In summer 2014, Whedon encountered artist Shawnee Kilgore on Kickstarter. Whedon funded her album and when Kilgore contacted him about his fulfillment reward, he suggested they make a song together. She agreed, and the collaboration was later repurposed into producing an EP.

At the 2015 San Diego Comic-Con, Whedon announced Twist, which was described as a comic book about "a Victorian female Batman".

In 2017, Whedon directed Unlocked, a short film in support of Planned Parenthood.

==== Justice League ====
In May 2017, Whedon took over post-production duties for Justice League, including writing and directing additional photography for the film. He received a co-writing credit for his contributions to the film, which was released in November 2017. Despite reshooting a majority of the film and largely changing the tone from what Zack Snyder had originally intended, Snyder retained sole credit as director of the film. After Snyder's original cut was released in 2021, fans began to refer to the theatrical cut as the "Whedon Cut" and "Josstice League".

=== 2020s ===
==== The Nevers ====
On July 13, 2018, HBO announced that the network had obtained the rights to The Nevers, an "epic science fiction drama about a gang of Victorian women who find themselves with unusual abilities, relentless enemies, and a mission that might change the world", on which Whedon was going to serve as writer, director, executive producer, and showrunner. Production on the series started in July 2019 in London, with scenes filmed at Trinity Church Square and the New Wimbledon Theatre area. By 2020, production was completed on five episodes before being shut down due to the COVID-19 pandemic, only resuming in September of that year to complete six of the season's ten-episode order. On November 25, 2020, HBO announced that Whedon had exited the project.

== Accusations of workplace harassment ==
In July 2020, Justice League actor Ray Fisher accused Whedon of showing "gross, abusive, unprofessional, and completely unacceptable" behavior toward the cast and crew of the film, going so far as to invite Whedon to sue him for slander if he believed the allegations were untrue. A virtual panel for the 2020 at-home San Diego Comic-Con focusing on Whedon's work was cancelled following Fisher's statements. The following month, it was reported that WarnerMedia had begun an investigation into Whedon's behavior during the production of Justice League. Jason Momoa posted in support of Fisher, writing about "the shitty way [they] were treated" on Justice League reshoots and saying that "serious stuff went down". In December 2020, WarnerMedia announced that its investigation had concluded and that "remedial action" had been taken.

Fisher also claimed that Whedon's exit from the HBO series The Nevers was a result of HBO parent company WarnerMedia's inquiry. He said on Twitter that "I have no intention of allowing Joss Whedon to use the old Hollywood tactic of 'exiting'" and claimed, "This is undoubtedly a result of [the investigation]." HBO had announced on November 25, 2020, that the company had "parted ways" with Whedon, and Whedon released his own statement, claiming the departure was due to the COVID-19 pandemic. HBO chief Casey Bloys declined to elaborate on the decision to part ways, but said HBO had received no complaints about Whedon's behavior. Nonetheless, in what Bloys acknowledged was an unusual step, Whedon's name has not been used in marketing for the series, though he remained credited in the series itself.

Gal Gadot told the Los Angeles Times in December 2020 that her experience with Whedon had not been "the best" but that she had taken it "to the higher-ups and they took care of it". Grace Randolph later reported that Whedon had asked Gadot to film a sexually charged scene in Justice League, but that Gadot had refused and a body double was used in her place.

In February 2021, Buffy the Vampire Slayer and Angel actress Charisma Carpenter alleged that Whedon had "abused his power on numerous occasions", calling him a "vampire" and "casually cruel". In a tweeted statement, Carpenter said that Whedon had called her "fat" and asked her "if [she] was going to keep it" upon learning of her pregnancy, mocked her religious faith, and repeatedly threatened to fire her, which he ultimately did. Carpenter also revealed that she had participated in WarnerMedia's Justice League investigation.

Buffy co-stars Amber Benson and Michelle Trachtenberg corroborated Carpenter's allegations. On social media, Benson wrote: "Buffy was a toxic environment and it starts at the top. [Carpenter] is speaking truth". Trachtenberg wrote that "we know what he did" and alleged that his behavior toward her when she was a teenager was, "Very. Not. Appropriate." Trachtenberg later stated on social media that there was a rule on set preventing Whedon from being in a room alone with her. Buffy star Sarah Michelle Gellar also lent her support and distanced herself from Whedon. Jose Molina, a writer on Firefly, also spoke out against Whedon's behavior, saying that "casually cruel" was a "perfect" description and that "He thought being mean was funny. Making female writers cry during a notes session was especially hysterical. He actually liked to boast about the time he made one writer cry twice in one meeting." Other Buffy and Angel costars voiced their support for the alleged victims including David Boreanaz, James Marsters, Anthony Stewart Head, Eliza Dushku, J. August Richards, and Amy Acker. Marsters said, however, that he thought that Whedon's intensity toward the Buffy cast was because "he put an enormous amount of pressure on himself ... trying to accomplish something that was a very high bar".

In April 2021, in light of Fisher's accusations, Gadot told The Hollywood Reporter that "I had my issues with Whedon and Warner Bros handled it in a timely manner." A knowledgeable source stated that Gadot "had multiple concerns with the revised version of the film, including issues about her character being more aggressive than her character in Wonder Woman. 'She wanted to make the character flow from one movie to the next,'" the report said. "The biggest clash, sources say, came when Whedon pushed Gadot to record lines she didn't like, threatened to harm Gadot's career and disparaged Wonder Woman director Patty Jenkins." The following month, Gadot added that Whedon "threatened" her career during the reshoots, saying, "if I did something, he would make my career miserable and I just took care of it instead." In October of that year, Gadot went on to say that she was "shocked" by the way Whedon spoke to her, adding, "You're dizzy because you can't believe this was just said to you. And if he says it to me, then obviously he says it to many other people."

In January 2022, Whedon claimed Gadot "misunderstood" him due to English not being her first language and called Fisher a "bad actor in both senses". He also said he had never worked with "a ruder group of people" than the rest of the Justice League cast. Gadot responded to this by stating that she "understood perfectly" and would not work with Whedon again in the future.

In October 2023, screenwriter Zak Penn wrote in the book MCU: The Reign of Marvel Studios that during the process of writing the script for The Avengers and finding a director for the project, "All the other directors we had been talking about, Joss wasn't on the list. I heard he was going to rewrite the script himself. He didn't even want to meet with me – which, by the way, I always call the writer I'm replacing. I feel like that's courtesy." When Penn reached out to Whedon personally, "He said to me, 'No, it's not awkward for me. I'm rewriting you.' It became pretty apparent that he had less than zero interest in, in any way, having me involved with the movie." Penn also called Whedon, "a d*ck" [sic] as well as "a bad person".

== Unrealized projects ==
Early in his career, Whedon sold two spec scripts that were not produced, Suspension and Afterlife. He sold Suspension for $750,000, with an additional $250,000 if production had commenced. In September 2014, Empire suggested the script was being made, with Liam Neeson attached to the project. In 1994, he sold Afterlife for $1.5 million, with an additional $500,000 if production had commenced. In 2000, Andy Tennant was in talks to direct and rewrite. In Afterlife there were precursors to themes Whedon would later explore in Dollhouse. The script was about Daniel Hoffstetter, a government scientist, who awakes after dying to discover his mind has been imprinted on a mind-wiped body.

Whedon had a number of planned Buffy the Vampire Slayer spinoffs that became stuck in development or terminally stalled. Among these were Buffy the Animated Series, a set of television movies for The WB based on Angel and Buffy characters, a Spike spin-off film, and Ripper, a proposed BBC pilot about Rupert Giles.

Goners was announced in 2005. According to Variety magazine, it was a fantasy thriller under development by Universal Pictures, and was to be produced by Mary Parent and Scott Stuber. From a 2006 interview with Fanboy Radio: "I've been seeing a lot of horror movies that are torture porn, where kids we don't care about are mutilated for hours, and I just cannot abide them... it's an antidote to that very kind of film, the horror movie with the expendable human beings in it. Because I don't believe any human beings are".

Whedon was hired to write and direct a Warner Bros. adaptation of Wonder Woman. However, in February 2007, Whedon announced that he would no longer be involved with the project. "We just saw different movies, and at the price range this kind of movie hangs in, that's never gonna work. Non-sympatico. [sic] It happens all the time". Conversely, he stated, "the fact of the matter is, it was a waste of my time. We never [wanted] to make the same movie; none of us knew that". Whedon also pitched a screenplay to adapt Batman for the same company as development started on what would eventually become Batman Begins. It was described as having included a new, "more of a 'Hannibal Lecter' type" villain, and portrayed Bruce Wayne as "a morbid, death-obsessed kid" whose grief was overcome by protecting a girl from being bullied in an alley similar to where his parents were murdered. In March 2017, Whedon was in negotiations to direct, write, and produce Batgirl set in the DC Extended Universe. He withdrew from the project in February 2018, saying he didn't have a story for the movie.

The sequel to Dr. Horrible's Sing-Along Blog has been shelved on multiple occasions. In 2009, Whedon remarked upon the possibility of presenting it in the form of another miniseries or a feature film. The script was planned to be written in summer 2012 and the principal photography to take place the following year. However, production was delayed because of his commitment to projects at Marvel Studios.

Wastelanders, a web-based "end-of-the-world" project, once in development with author Warren Ellis, was postponed due to Whedon's preoccupation with The Avengers.

== Themes, style and influences ==
Everybody has a perspective. Everybody in your scene, including the thug flanking your bad guy, has a reason. They have their own voice, their own identity, their own history. If anyone speaks in such a way that they're just setting up the next person's lines, then you don't get dialogue: you get soundbites.

— Whedon on giving each character a distinct voice.

Thematically, Whedon's work often explores perspectives on existentialism, anti-authoritarianism, free will, power, powerlessness, sexuality, adulthood, sacrifice, atheism, misogyny and feminism. His projects usually revolve around an ensemble of protagonists, primarily focused on a loner hero who ends up working with others to accomplish a goal. He says of the recurring aspects of community, "Everything I write tends to turn into a superhero team, even if I didn't mean for it to. I always start off wanting to be solitary, because a) it's simpler, and b) that isolation is something that I relate to as a storyteller. And then no matter what, I always end up with a team". Examining a typical motif, he says, "I tend to write about people who are helpless or out of control who then regain or retake control".

Articulating his approach to screenwriting, Whedon has noted outlining and act structure as the hardest parts of storytelling, but emphasizes that he feels they are "completely essential". Many of Whedon's altered phrases and heavily popularized words have entered a common usage called "Slayer Slang", which PBS included an entire section of in their article series Do You Speak American?. In an issue of Buffy the Vampire Slayer Season Eight, where Buffy travels to the future, Whedon writes Buffy's reaction to the future dialect of Manhattan; this allows Whedon to comment on the series' distinctive style of dialogue; "Buffy blames herself for what's happened to the English language, and there's a lot of hubris in that joke. I like to think that adding Y's to words that don't usually have Y's is going to destroy the whole fabric of our society". His use of self-aware dialogue to humanize characters, which relies heavily on dry humor and subtext, subversive treatment of clichés, use of misogyny as a trait of his villains, and the recurring theme of self-sacrifice led by subverting moral icons are defining traits of his style of storytelling.

His penchant for killing off characters has been widely acknowledged. Whedon responded to the criticism, saying, "The percentage of people who die... is a lot. I think it's pretty near everybody. The percentage of people that I kill—not so many. I think the reason that my rep is so nasty is that I tend to do it... unexpectedly, or to someone people are recently invested in, and that is a real mission statement for me, because, death doesn't leave a card. Death doesn't take Hitler. It doesn't work according to story plans, and when a death feels like a loss, gives you grief... then you have told a story that involves death." Dramatic effect is used to convey the sense of realism and shock value that comes from fatal circumstances.

Whedon has kept ambivalent on whether to shoot on film or digital video, saying that he has "no allegiance to film as film. If the story is in front of me, I'm fine". In terms of visual aesthetics, he prefers to incorporate as many practical effects as possible when using computer-generated imagery, so people "really don't know where one begins and the other ends". On working with high or low budgets, he remarked that both offer "the exact same job" and whether one has $100 million or $100,000, "you're trying to hit someone in the gut with an emotional moment." Whedon determines that, although giving actors notes for guidance, he also aims to assuage their concerns when communicating the reasons and outcomes of a scene.

Whedon has cited Ray Bradbury, James Cameron, Rod Serling, William Shakespeare, Stephen Sondheim, Steven Spielberg, Charles Dickens, Stan Lee, Robert Klein, Jerome Robbins, Frank Borzage, Steve Gerber, Steven Bochco, Frances Hodgson Burnett and John Williams as influences. When asked about his five favorite films, Whedon listed The Matrix, Once Upon a Time in the West, The Bad and the Beautiful, Magnolia and The Court Jester.

=== Feminism ===
Elements of feminism are present throughout much of Whedon's work and he gives his mother credit for inspiring this. The character Kitty Pryde from the X-Men comics was an early model for Whedon's strong teenage girl characters. He said, "If there's a bigger influence on Buffy than Kitty, I don't know what it was. She was an adolescent girl finding out she has great power and dealing with it." Kitty Pryde later played a central role in Whedon's run on Astonishing X-Men.

In college, Whedon studied a theory called "womb envy", a concept he says observes "a fundamental thing that women have something men don't, the obvious being an ability to bear children. Men not only don't get what's important about what women are capable of, but in fact they fear it, and envy it, and want to throw stones at it, because it's the thing they can't have." In 2007, Whedon expressed his outrage over the murder of Du'a Khalil Aswad, and because the act was caught on video, was prompted to attack the underlying attitude he felt led to the murder, comparing the video to torture porn.

In late 2013, Whedon spoke at an Equality Now event, where he issued a pointed dissection of the word "feminist". He begins to say, "I have the privilege living my life inside of words ... but part of being a writer is also living in the very smallest part of every word." Arguing against the suffix "-ist", he continues, "you can't be born an –ist. It's not natural." Whedon explains that because of this, the word "includes the idea that believing men and women to be equal ... is not a natural state. That we don't emerge assuming that everybody in the human race is a human. That the idea of equality is just an idea that's imposed on us..." This sparked an unfavorable reaction from the feminist community, but also an appreciation for Whedon's arguments' thought provocation.

News website Digital Spy released in early 2015 an interview they had conducted with Whedon, during which he criticized the entertainment industry for its "genuine, recalcitrant, intractable sexism, and old-fashioned quiet misogyny". Whedon offered The Hunger Games film series as an argument for female-led franchises, and hoped Marvel Studios would pursue production of more such franchises. However, critics noted an almost stereotypical lack of feminist ideals in his writing decisions and portrayal of Black Widow, one of two female protagonists in Marvel's 2015 Avengers: Age of Ultron, played by Scarlett Johansson.

== Frequent collaborators ==
Whedon has been noted as repeatedly casting the same actors across multiple projects and has been described as "the gravitational center of the Whedonverse, a galaxy that spins recurring actors and themes through an orbital system of TV shows, films and comic books that all share similar traits: a unique brand of witty dialogue, relatable characters and fantasy/sci-fi mythology".

Actor	Buffy the Vampire Slayer (1997–2003)	Angel (1999–2004)	Firefly (2002)	Serenity (2005)	Dr. Horrible's Sing-Along Blog (2008)	Dollhouse (2009–10)	The Cabin in the Woods (2011) (Note: Whedon co-wrote and produced but did not direct the film.)	The Avengers (2012)	Much Ado About Nothing (2012)	Agents of S.H.I.E.L.D. (2013–2020)	Avengers: Age of Ultron (2015)	The Nevers (2021)	Total roles	Ref.
Amy Acker		Yes				Yes	Yes		Yes	Yes			5	
Adam Baldwin		Yes	Yes	Yes									3	
Felicia Day	Yes				Yes	Yes							3	
Alexis Denisof	Yes	Yes				Yes		Yes	Yes				5	
Reed Diamond						Yes			Yes	Yes			3	
Eliza Dushku	Yes	Yes				Yes							3	
Nathan Fillion	Yes		Yes	Yes	Yes				Yes				5	
Enver Gjokaj						Yes		Yes		Yes			3	
Summer Glau		Yes	Yes	Yes		Yes							4	
Carlos Jacott	Yes	Yes	Yes										3	
Ashley Johnson						Yes		Yes	Yes				3	
Fran Kranz						Yes	Yes		Yes				3	
Tom Lenk	Yes	Yes					Yes		Yes				4	
Damion Poitier			Yes			Yes		Yes					3	
Andy Umberger	Yes	Yes	Yes										3	
Jonathan M. Woodward	Yes	Yes	Yes										3	

Note: Due to Whedon's frequent casting of the same actors in various projects, the above list only includes those who have played three or more different roles in Whedon productions; actors that only played one role in multiple Whedon productions are not included.

== Personal life ==
In 2013, Whedon said that he is a workaholic. This arose during the time that followed the completion of Much Ado About Nothing, which was made in the span of a two-week vacation from The Avengers, and after making the pilot for Agents of S.H.I.E.L.D. amidst the pre-production for Avengers: Age of Ultron. "It is actually a problem. Sometimes it's adorable ... and sometimes it's not ... Not to get all dark and weird, but it is something I need to address." He has been a member of the Academy of Motion Picture Arts and Sciences in its Writers' branch since 2017.

=== Marriages ===
In 1995, Whedon married Kai Cole, an architect, producer and co-founder of Bellwether Pictures. They have two children together. Whedon and Cole separated in 2012 and divorced in 2016. In 2017, Cole claimed that Whedon had repeatedly been unfaithful to her and that he "does not practice what he preaches" in regard to feminism.

Whedon married Canadian artist Heather Horton in February 2021.

=== Religious and philosophical views ===
Whedon has identified himself as an atheist. Whedon has identified as an absurdist and existentialist. A committed humanist, Whedon was presented with the Outstanding Lifetime Achievement Award in Cultural Humanism by the Humanist Chaplaincy at Harvard University in 2009. He has spoken about existentialism, explaining in detail how it, and more specifically Jean-Paul Sartre's Nausea, was used as a basis for the Firefly episode "Objects in Space". He called it "the most important book" he ever read, and said it was given to him right after he saw Steven Spielberg's Close Encounters of the Third Kind, whose impact, he recalls, had made him an existentialist.

=== Political views ===
In July 2012, at San Diego Comic-Con, in response to one woman who noted the anti-corporate themes in many of his films and asked him to give his economic philosophy in 30 seconds or less, Whedon spoke out against capitalism, saying that America is "turning into Tsarist Russia".

Endorsing Barack Obama in the 2012 United States presidential election, Whedon satirically equated Mitt Romney's future as president with a zombie apocalypse, quipping, "Romney is ready to make the deep rollbacks in health care, education, social services and reproductive rights that will guarantee poverty, unemployment, overpopulation, disease, rioting—all crucial elements in creating a nightmare zombie wasteland."

In 2015, Whedon signed a petition as part of a political campaign calling for Elizabeth Warren to run for President of the United States.

In January 2017, after actress Nicole Kidman publicly suggested that America should accept that Donald Trump is president, Whedon tweeted a photograph of plastic puppet Lady Penelope Creighton-Ward alongside an image of Kidman, an action some interpreted as mocking and objectifying Kidman's physical appearance. That same month, Whedon also received criticism for reportedly comparing Ivanka Trump to a dog and for wishing that Paul Ryan would be raped to death by a rhinoceros. Referring to Ivanka's husband Jared Kushner and Trump, he tweeted: "He's a Voldemort in training, & unlike the Pekingese he married under, can play the long game." Whedon stated that he had been referring to Donald Trump. In April 2017, Whedon took a shot at Republicans by criticizing the physical appearance of teenage cancer survivors who were visiting then–Speaker of the House Paul Ryan. He later apologized on Twitter.

== Bibliography ==
=== Dark Horse Comics ===
- Buffy the Vampire Slayer:
  - Fray #1–8 (with Karl Moline, 2001–2003) collected as Fray (tpb, 216 pages, 2003, ISBN 1-56971-751-6)
  - Angel: Legacy Edition Book Two (tpb, 304 pages, Boom! Studios, 2020, ISBN 1-68415-490-1) includes:
    - Angel vol. 2 #1–4 (co-written by Whedon and Brett Matthews, art by Mel Rubi, 2001–2002)
      - Also collected as Angel: Long Night's Journey (tpb, 104 pages, 2002, ISBN 1-56971-752-4)
      - Also collected in Angel Omnibus (tpb, 480 pages, 2011, ISBN 1-59582-706-4)
    - Dark Horse Extra #36–38 (untitled three-page story co-written by Whedon and Brett Matthews, art by Mel Rubi, 2001)
  - Buffy the Vampire Slayer: Tales (hc, 296 pages, 2011, ISBN 1-59582-644-0; tpb, 2018, ISBN 1-5067-0802-1) includes:
    - Tales of the Slayers (anthology graphic novel, 96 pages, 2002, ISBN 1-56971-605-6) featured three short stories by Whedon:
      - "Prologue" (with Leinil Francis Yu)
      - "Righteous" (with Tim Sale)
      - "Tales" (with Karl Moline)
    - Tales of the Vampires #1–5: "Tales of the Vampires" (with Alex Sanchez, leading feature in the anthology, 2003–2004)
      - In addition to the leading feature, Whedon also wrote "Stacy" (art by Cameron Stewart), a short story published in issue #1 (2003)
      - The entire 5-issue limited series was also collected as Tales of the Vampires (tpb, 144 pages, 2004, ISBN 1-56971-749-4)
  - Buffy the Vampire Slayer Season Eight:
    - Volume 1 (hc, 304 pages, 2012, ISBN 1-59582-888-5) includes:
      - "The Long Way Home" (with Georges Jeanty, in #1–4, 2007)
      - "The Chain" (with Paul Lee, in #5, 2007)
      - "Anywhere but Here" (with Cliff Richards, in #10, 2008)
      - MySpace Dark Horse Presents #24: "Always Darkest" (with Jo Chen, digital anthology, 2007)
    - Volume 2 (hc, 320 pages, 2012, ISBN 1-59582-935-0) includes:
      - "A Beautiful Sunset" (with Georges Jeanty, in #11, 2008)
      - "Time of Your Life" (with Karl Moline, in #16–19, 2008)
      - Buffy the Vampire Slayer: Willow (with Karl Moline, one-shot, 2009)
    - Volume 4 (hc, 320 pages, 2013, ISBN 1-61655-127-5) includes:
      - "Turbulence" (with Georges Jeanty, in #31, 2010)
      - "Last Gleaming" (with Georges Jeanty, in #36–40, 2010–2011)
  - Buffy the Vampire Slayer Season Nine #1: "Freefall, Part One" (with Georges Jeanty, 2011) collected in Buffy the Vampire Slayer Season Nine Volume 1 (hc, 304 pages, 2015, ISBN 1-61655-715-X)
  - Buffy the Vampire Slayer Season Eleven: Giles #1–4 (co-written by Whedon and Erika Alexander, art by Jon Lam, 2018) collected as Giles: Girl Blue (tpb, 104 pages, 2018, ISBN 1-5067-0743-2)
  - Buffy the Vampire Slayer Season Twelve #1–4 (scripted by Christos Gage from a plot by Whedon and Gage, art by Georges Jeanty, 2018)
- Serenity (plotted by Whedon, scripted by others):
  - Firefly: Legacy Edition Book One (tpb, 288 pages, Boom! Studios, 2018, ISBN 1-68415-320-4) includes:
    - Serenity #1–3 (written by Brett Matthews, drawn by Will Conrad, 2005) also collected as Serenity: Those Left Behind (tpb, 80 pages, 2006, ISBN 1-59307-449-2; hc, 96 pages, 2007, ISBN 1-59307-846-3)
    - Serenity: Better Days #1–3 (written by Brett Matthews, drawn by Will Conrad, 2008) also collected as Serenity: Better Days (tpb, 80 pages, 2008, ISBN 1-59582-162-7; hc, 128 pages, 2010, ISBN 1-59582-561-4)
    - Serenity: The Shepherd's Tale (written by Zack Whedon, drawn by Chris Samnee, graphic novel, 56 pages, 2010, ISBN 1-59582-561-4)
- MySpace Dark Horse Presents #1–3: "Sugarshock!" (with Fábio Moon, digital anthology, 2007) collected in MySpace Dark Horse Presents Volume 1 (tpb, 176 pages, 2008, ISBN 1-59307-998-2)
- Twist (unreleased 6-issue limited series starring "a Victorian female Batman" — initially announced in 2015)
- Dr. Horrible: Best Friends Forever (with José Maria Beroy and Sara Soler, one-shot, 2018) collected in Dr. Horrible and Other Horrible Stories (tpb, 136 pages, 2019, ISBN 1-5067-1231-2)

=== Marvel Comics ===
- X-Men:
  - Astonishing X-Men vol. 3 (with John Cassaday, 2004–2008) collected as:
    - Ultimate Collection: Astonishing X-Men Volume 1 (collects #1–12, hc, 320 pages, 2006, ISBN 0-7851-1733-4; tpb, 2012, ISBN 0-7851-6194-5)
    - Ultimate Collection: Astonishing X-Men Volume 2 (collects #13–24 and the Giant-Sized Astonishing X-Men one-shot special, hc, 344 pages, 2008, ISBN 0-7851-2253-2; tpb, 2012, ISBN 0-7851-6195-3)
    - Astonishing X-Men by Joss Whedon and John Cassaday Omnibus (collects #1–24 and the Giant-Sized Astonishing X-Men one-shot special, hc, 672 pages, 2009, ISBN 0-7851-3801-3)
  - Giant-Size X-Men #3: "Teamwork" (with Neal Adams, co-feature, 2005) collected in Giant-Size X-Men: 40th Anniversary (hc, 440 pages, 2015, ISBN 0-7851-9777-X)
- Stan Lee Meets Spider-Man: "Some Steves" (with Michael Gaydos, co-feature in one-shot, 2006) collected in Stan Lee Meets... (hc, 240 pages, 2007, ISBN 0-7851-2272-9)
- Runaways vol. 2 #25–30: "Dead-End Kids" (with Michael Ryan, 2007–2008) collected in Runaways: The Complete Collection Volume 3 (tpb, 528 pages, 2015, ISBN 0-7851-8917-3)
- Captain America: Sam Wilson #7: "Presentation" (with John Cassaday, co-feature, 2016) collected in Captain America: Sam Wilson — The Complete Collection Volume 2 (tpb, 504 pages, 2021, ISBN 1-302-92297-1)

=== Other publishers ===
- Superman/Batman #26 (with John Cassaday, two-page sequence among other writers and artists, DC Comics, 2006) collected in Superman/Batman Volume 2 (tpb, 336 pages, 2014, ISBN 1-4012-5079-3)
- Angel: After the Fall (scripted by Brian Lynch from plots by Whedon and Lynch, art by Franco Urru, Tim Kane (#6–8), Nick Runge (#9–12) and Stephen Mooney (#12–14), IDW Publishing, 2007–2009) collected as:
  - Volume 1 (collects #1–5, hc, 144 pages, 2008, ISBN 1-60010-181-X; tpb, 2009, ISBN 1-60010-343-X)
  - Volume 2 (collects #6–8, hc, 104 pages, 2008, ISBN 1-60010-231-X; tpb, 2009, ISBN 1-60010-393-6)
  - Volume 3 (collects #9–12, hc, 128 pages, 2009, ISBN 1-60010-377-4; tpb, 2010, ISBN 1-61377-059-6)
  - Volume 4 (collects #13–17, hc, 136 pages, 2010, ISBN 1-60010-461-4; tpb, 2011, ISBN 1-61377-100-2)
  - Premiere Edition Volume 1 (collects #1–17, hc, 432 pages, 2011, ISBN 1-60010-861-X)

== Selected accolades ==
Year	Award	Category	Title of work	Result	Ref.
1995	Academy Awards	Best Original Screenplay	Toy Story	Nominated	
2000	Emmy Awards	Outstanding Writing for a Drama Series	Buffy the Vampire Slayer episode: "Hush"	Nominated	
2006	Eisner Awards	Best Continuing Series	Astonishing X-Men	Won	
2008	Eisner Awards	Best New Series	Buffy the Vampire Slayer Season Eight	Won	
2008	Eisner Awards	Best Digital Comic/Webcomic	Sugarshock!	Won	
2009	Bradbury Award	Outstanding Dramatic Presentation	—N/a	Won	
2009	Emmy Awards	Outstanding Short-Format Live-Action Entertainment Program	Dr. Horrible's Sing-Along Blog	Won	
2013	Saturn Awards	Best Writing	The Cabin in the Woods	Nominated	
2013	Saturn Awards	Best Director (Saturn)	The Avengers	Won	
2013	Empire Awards	Best Director (Empire)	The Avengers	Nominated	

== Notes ==
Preceded by Howard Mackie	Astonishing X-Men writer 2004–2008	Succeeded by Warren Ellis
Preceded by Brian K. Vaughan	Runaways writer 2007–2008	Succeeded by Terry Moore
