= USS Weeden =

Buckley-class destroyer escort

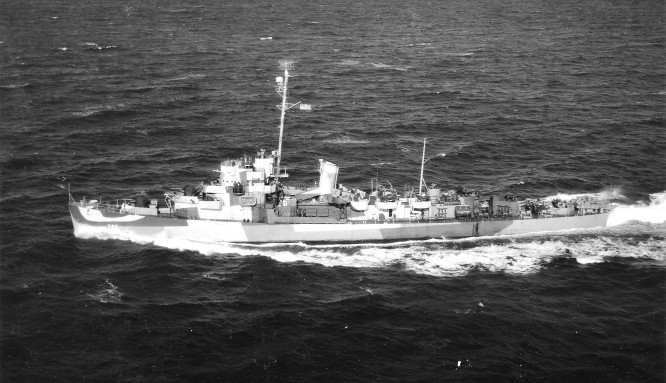
- Weeden on 19 January 1945

History

United States
- Name: USS Weeden
- Namesake: Carl A. Weeden
- Builder: Consolidated Steel Corporation, Orange, Texas
- Laid down: 18 August 1943
- Launched: 27 October 1943
- Commissioned: 19 February 1944
- Decommissioned: 9 May 1946
- In service: 20 November 1946
- Out of service: 26 May 1950
- Recommissioned: 26 May 1950
- Decommissioned: 26 February 1958
- Stricken: 30 June 1968
- Fate: Sold for scrapping, 27 October 1969

General characteristics
- Class & type: Buckley-class destroyer escort
- Displacement: 1,400 long tons (1,422 t)
- Length: 306 ft (93 m)
- Beam: 37 ft (11 m)
- Draft: 13 ft 6 in (4.11 m)
- Propulsion: Turbo-electric drive, 12,000 shp (8.9 MW); 2 shafts
- Speed: 23.6 knots (43.7 km/h; 27.2 mph)
- Complement: 213 officers and enlisted
- Armament: 3 × 3"/50 caliber guns; 1 × quad 1.1"/75 caliber gun; 8 × single 20 mm guns; 1 × triple 21-inch (533 mm) torpedo tubes; 1 × Hedgehog anti-submarine mortar; 8 × K-gun depth charge projectors; 2 × depth charge tracks

USS Weeden (DE-797) was a Buckley-class destroyer escort in service with the United States Navy from 1944 to 1946 and from 1950 to 1958. She was scrapped in 1969.

== Service history ==
Weeden was named for Ensign Carl A. Weeden (1916–1941), who was killed during the Japanese attack on Pearl Harbor while serving on USS Arizona. The ship was laid down on 18 August 1943 at Orange, Texas, by the Consolidated Steel Corporation; launched on 27 October 1943, sponsored by Mrs. Alice N. Weeden (Carl Weeden's grandmother); and commissioned on 19 February 1944.

=== World War II, 1944–45 ===
After a fitting-out period complicated by the necessity for repairs to her power plant, the destroyer escort departed Galveston, Texas, on 30 March 1944 for her shakedown cruise. Arriving at Bermuda on 5 April, she spent the rest of the month in training exercises; she left Bermuda on 1 May, and arrived in Boston, Massachusetts, on the 6th. She completed voyage repairs on the 14th and moved to Provincetown, Massachusetts, where she served for a month as target ship for the Atlantic Fleet Torpedo Squadron Training School. Near the end of June, she reported for duty in Escort Division 56.

On 4 July, she departed Boston in the screen of a convoy bound for Bizerte, Tunisia. The entire round-trip voyage, during which she escorted convoys in both directions, occupied her time until 18 August when she re-entered Boston. After training exercises at Casco Bay, Maine, she rendezvoused with another Bizerte-bound convoy near Norfolk, Virginia, in mid-September. About halfway across the ocean, CortDiv 56 received orders to part company with the convoy and head for Plymouth, England, where they picked up a convoy of LSTs bound for the United States. Arriving home on 25 October, she again completed voyage repairs and conducted anti-submarine warfare (ASW) exercises at Casco Bay. On 17 November, she joined another trans-atlantic convoy at Norfolk. That voyage took her via Gibraltar to Oran, Algeria, thence back to the United States, at Boston where she arrived at the end of the last week in December. She completed repairs in the navy yard at Charlestown early in January 1945, and then moved to Norfolk where she served briefly as a school ship.

On 28 January, the destroyer escort departed Norfolk for duty with the Pacific Fleet. She transited the Panama Canal on 7 February and laid in a course for Manus in the Admiralty Islands, where she arrived late in the month.

After a week of repairs at Manus, the warship received orders assigning her to the Philippine Sea Frontier and got underway for Leyte. From March to September, she served under that command, escorting convoys both among the various islands of the Philippines and between the Philippines and American bases in other island groups. Her first escort assignment was a round-trip voyage to Ulithi and back to Leyte. In April, she saw a convoy safely to Hollandia, New Guinea, and returned to Leyte with a formation of tugs.

Early in May, she made a high-speed mail delivery on the Philippine circuit, visiting Zamboanga, Mindoro, Iloilo, Manila, and Subic Bay. For the remainder of May and the entire month of June, she operated in the Philippines, either patrolling the entrance to San Pedro Bay, Leyte; escorting convoys from Leyte to Manila; or making the inter-island mail run. In July, Weeden made two round-trip voyages escorting convoys between Leyte and Ulithi. At the conclusion of the second run, she steamed to Subic Bay where she joined the escort of a convoy bound for Okinawa. She departed Subic Bay on 27 July with a large group of LSTs and LSMs, and after evading a typhoon, arrived at Okinawa on 4 August. Three days later, the destroyer escort started back to Leyte. During her return voyage, the atomic bomb fell on Japan; and soon after her arrival at Leyte, the Japanese capitulated.

=== Post-war activities, 1945–46 ===
Over the next few weeks, Weeden completed escort missions in support of the developing occupation of former Japanese territory. Late in August, she made a voyage from Manila to Okinawa and back. Following that, the destroyer escort screened a British escort carrier to Nagasaki, where the latter ship picked up former Allied prisoners of war for repatriation. On the return voyage, Weeden herself carried 70 Dutch former prisoners as far as Okinawa and then continued on to Subic Bay for repairs.

En route, she received orders to assume plane guard duty on a station located about 100 miles north of Luzon. She performed that duty for four days and then resumed her voyage to the Philippines. She arrived in Subic Bay on 26 September and remained there, undergoing repairs, until 10 November.

After a stop at Manila from 10 to 26 November, Weeden got underway to return to the United States. En route she stopped at Eniwetok and Pearl Harbor before arriving in San Pedro, Los Angeles, on 17 December. After five months of inactivity, she was finally placed out of commission on 9 May 1946, and was berthed with the San Diego Group, Pacific Reserve Fleet.

=== Naval Reserve training, 1946–57 ===
In November 1946, Weeden resumed activity, though she remained out of commission. On 20 November, she reported for duty training naval reservists in the 11th Naval District. After almost four years of that duty, she changed status once more, when she was placed in commission, in reserve, on 26 May 1950. Almost three months later, Weeden reported for duty with the Pacific Fleet, though her mission – Naval Reserve training in the 11th Naval District – appears to have remained the same. Over the next seven years her training cruises took her north to British Columbia, south as far as Callao, Peru, and west to the Hawaiian Islands. Her center of operations, however, remained the coast of California.

=== Decommissioning and sale ===
On 26 November 1957, Weeden began inactivation overhaul at Portland, Oregon. She was decommissioned on 26 February 1958 and was berthed at Astoria, Oregon, with the Columbia River Group, Pacific Reserve Fleet. She remained there just over a decade until 30 June 1968, at which time her name was struck from the Navy List. She was sold for scrapping to Zidell Explorations, Inc., of Portland, Oregon, on 27 October 1969.

== See also ==
- List of patrol vessels of the United States Navy
