= Jed Whedon =

American screenwriter and musician (born 1975)

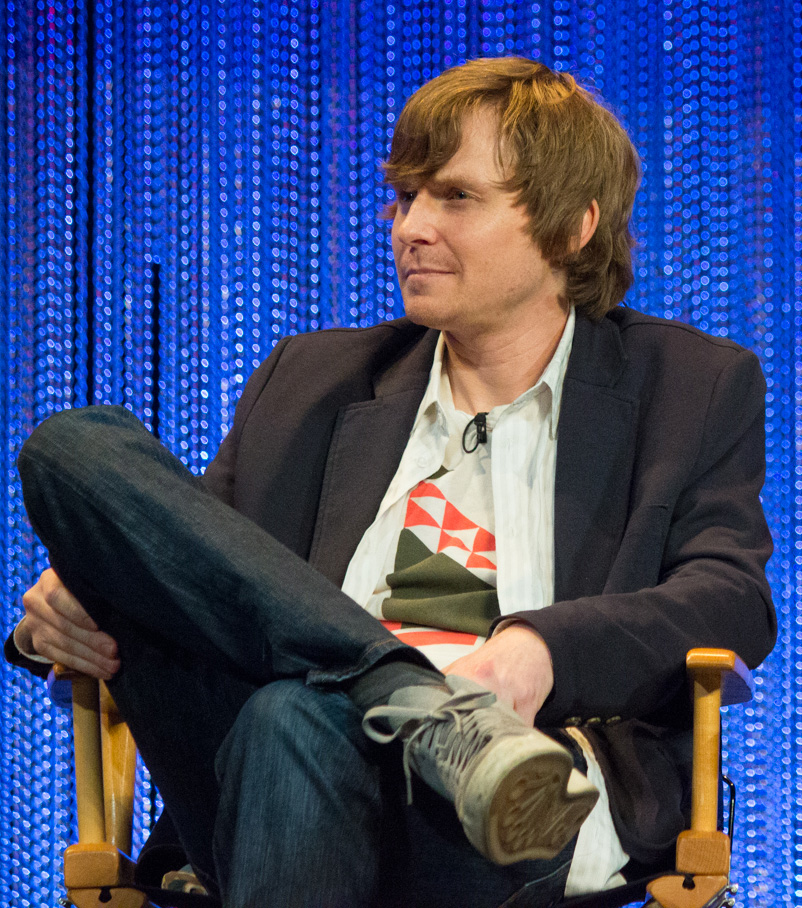
- Whedon in 2014
- Born: Jed Tucker Whedon; July 18, 1975 (age 50)
- Occupations: Writer, musician
- Spouse: Maurissa Tancharoen (m. 2009)
- Children: 1
- Father: Tom Whedon
- Relatives: John Whedon (grandfather); Zack Whedon (brother); Joss Whedon (half-brother); Kevin Tancharoen (brother-in-law)

Jed Tucker Whedon (born July 18, 1975) is an American screenwriter and musician, and the son of screenwriter Tom Whedon, grandson of screenwriter John Whedon, and the brother of screenwriter Zack Whedon and of filmmaker Joss Whedon.

== Career ==
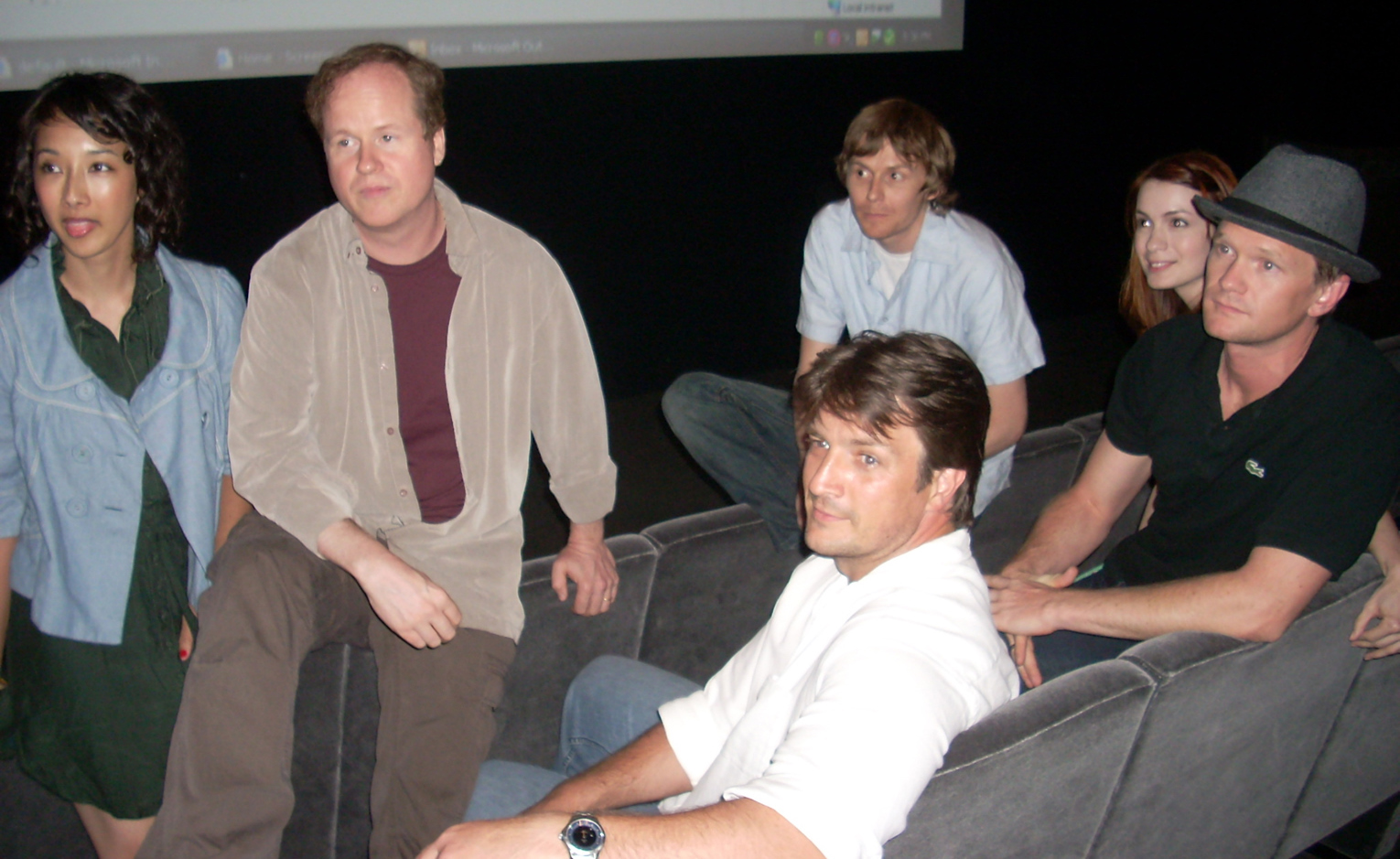
Jed Whedon (middle back) with other cast and crew for Dr. Horrible's Sing-Along Blog

Alongside his brothers Joss and Zack and his then fiancée Maurissa Tancharoen, he co-created and co-wrote the musical Dr. Horrible's Sing-Along Blog as well as playing almost every instrumental part. It was the subject of a salute by The Paley Center for Media and won an Emmy Award for Outstanding Special Class – Short-format Live-Action Entertainment Programs.

Prior to Dr. Horrible, Whedon composed scores for video games, and was a member of his now-defunct Los Angeles–based band The Southland. In 2010, he released an album entitled History of Forgotten Things under the band name "Jed Whedon and the Willing". Assisting him on the album were his wife Maurissa Tancharoen and their mutual friend Felicia Day, The Southland's guitarist and co-songwriter Nicholas Gusikoff and bassist Ethan Phillips, Jed's longtime friends Amir Yaghmai and Beau Barbour, and Jed's brothers Zack and Sam.

With Felicia Day, he composed the music to the song "(Do You Wanna Date My) Avatar" and music and lyrics for I'm the one that's cool for the web series The Guild, the videos for which he also directed.

He and his wife, Maurissa, were staff writers on Dollhouse, the Fox series created by his older brother Joss, prior to its cancellation. They then joined the staffs of Spartacus: Blood and Sand, co-created by former Mutant Enemy writer Steven S. DeKnight, and Drop Dead Diva.

In 2012, he released an EP with his wife Maurissa titled This Girl, which includes the track "Remains", written in 2009 for the TV show Dollhouse's season one finale, "Epitaph". Assisting on the album are Felicia Day singing backing vocals on "Second Nature" and "Mr. Electric" and Sam Whedon playing guitar on "Dangerous". In contrast to most of Jed's other music, lyrics are credited to Maurissa first on this record. The following year, both he and his wife sang on Joss' original score for his movie Much Ado About Nothing.

Whedon worked with his wife Maurissa and brother Joss on The Avengers. He and Maurissa worked as showrunners, producers, and writers for the ABC show Marvel's Agents of S.H.I.E.L.D. from 2013 to 2020.

In 2016, his band, Jed Whedon and the Willing, released their second studio album, an EP titled Like Snow with assistance from longtime musical collaborators Amir Yaghmai and Zack Whedon.

== Awards ==
For his work on Dr. Horrible's Sing-Along Blog, Whedon won two Streamy Awards for Best Writing for a Comedy Web Series and Best Original Music for a Web Series.

== Personal life ==
On April 19, 2009, he married fellow screenwriter Maurissa Tancharoen. The couple had a daughter in 2015.
