= Zack Whedon =

American screenwriter (born 1979)

- Born: Zachary Adam Whedon; August 14, 1979 (age 47); USA
- Education: Wesleyan University (B.A., 2002)
- Occupations: Screenwriter, film director, comic book writer
- Spouse: Eliza Clark (m. 2012)
- Parent: Tom Whedon (father)
- Relatives: John Whedon (grandfather); Jed Whedon (brother); Joss Whedon (half-brother); Spencer Treat Clark (brother-in-law)
- Writing career
- Genres: Action; comedy; crime; drama; fantasy; historical; musical; mystery; science fiction; thriller
- Notable works: Dr. Horrible's Sing-Along Blog; Rubicon; Fringe

Zachary Adam Whedon (born August 14, 1979) is an American screenwriter, film director, and comic book writer.

== Early life ==
Whedon is from a family of writers: he is the son of screenwriter Tom Whedon, grandson of screenwriter John Whedon, and the brother of screenwriter/musician Jed Whedon and producer/director/writer Joss Whedon.

== Career ==
His first professional work in television was as a production assistant on his brother Joss' series Angel.

Whedon joined the crew of the HBO western drama Deadwood as an assistant to executive producer David Milch for the first season in 2004. The series was created by Milch and focused on a growing town in the American West. Whedon returned as Milch's assistant for the second season in 2005. He also became a writer for the third and final season in 2006 when he co-wrote the episode "Amateur Night" with writer's assistant Nick Towne. Whedon and the writing staff were nominated for a Writers Guild of America Award for Outstanding Drama Series at the February 2007 ceremony for their work on the third season.

He also wrote and acted in an episode of Milch's next series John from Cincinnati.

Alongside his brothers Joss and Jed, he co-created and co-wrote the parody musical Dr. Horrible's Sing-Along Blog. He has worked on the FOX science-fiction series Fringe and the AMC drama Rubicon.

In January 2014, Dark Horse Comics released Serenity: Leaves on the Wind, a six-issue comic book series written by Whedon with art by Georges Jeanty that continues the story of brother Joss's cult television show Firefly, and its subsequent film adaptation Serenity. The comic is also executive produced by Joss Whedon and continues the story roughly 39 weeks after the events of the film. He was also a producer of the SundanceTV drama The Red Road and the AMC drama Halt and Catch Fire.

== Personal life ==
In 2012, Whedon married screenwriter and playwright Eliza Clark. The two met while writing for the TV series Rubicon.

== Writing credits ==
Film

- Come and Find Me (2016) (Also director)

Television

Year	Title	Season	Episode title	Episode	Notes
2021	In Treatment	4	“Colin-Week 1”, “Colin-Week 2”, “Colin-Week 3”, “Colin-Week 4”, “Colin-Week 5”, “Colin-Week 6”	2, 6, 10, 14, 18, 22	
2017	Halt and Catch Fire	4	"Miscellaneous", "Goodwill"	3, 8	Also co-executive producer
2015	Halt and Catch Fire	2	"Extract and Defend", "Limbo"	5, 8	Also co-executive producer
2014	Halt and Catch Fire	1	"Landfall", "The 214s"	6, 8	
2014	The Red Road	1	“The Bad Weapon”	4	Also co-producer
2013	Southland	5	"Off Duty", "Chaos"	5, 9	
2010	Rubicon	1	"A Good Days Work"	11	
2010	Rubicon	1	"Look to the Ant"	6	
2009	Fringe	1	"Unleashed"	16	
2009	Fringe	1	"The Transformation"	13	
2008	Fringe	1	"The Dreamscape"	9	
2008	Commentary! The Musical				Internet feature
2008	Dr. Horrible's Sing-Along Blog	1	"Act III"	3	
2007	John from Cincinnati	1	"His Visit: Day Nine"	10	
2006	Deadwood	3	"Amateur Night"	9	
