= Done the Impossible =

Done the Impossible: The Fans' Tale of 'Firefly' and 'Serenity'
- DVD Cover
- Directed by: Tony Hadlock; Jason Heppler; Jeremy Neish; Jared Nelson; Brian Wiser
- Produced by: Tony Hadlock; Jason Heppler; Jeremy Neish; Jared Nelson; Brian Wiser
- Release date: July 28, 2006 (U.S.)
- Running time: 79 minutes
- Country: United States
- Language: English

Done the Impossible is a 2006 documentary film on the fan following for Firefly. Its focus is on how fans came to love the show and played a part in the production of its feature film continuation Serenity.

== History ==
The title is taken from a line of dialogue, spoken by Malcolm Reynolds in the pilot episode of Firefly. In context, it referred to the Independents' achievement of (temporarily) holding Serenity Valley against the Alliance: "We have done the impossible, and that makes us mighty."

== Cast ==
Adam Baldwin serves as host with Jewel Staite doing a voice-over, and has interviews with cast, crew and numerous fans.

=== Firefly Actors ===
- Nathan Fillion
- Alan Tudyk
- Christina Hendricks
- Jewel Staite
- Morena Baccarin
- Ron Glass

=== Firefly Production ===
- Joss Whedon
- Tim Minear

=== Authors ===
- Orson Scott Card
- Keith R.A. DeCandido
- Tracy Hickman
- Margaret Weis

=== Others ===
- Mary Parent (Universal Pictures)
- Christopher Buchanan (Producer on Serenity)
- Greg Edmonson
- Loni Peristere
- Rafael Feldman
- Yan Feldman
- James Gunn
- Jenna Fischer
- John Cassaday

== Release ==
The film was released as a DVD with more than five hours of additional interviews, as well as various bonus features. The main feature was also released as a torrent under a noncommercial Creative Commons license.

== Reception ==
IGN Reviewer Eric Goldman noted "It's fun to see the interviews and the joy the show has brought to many.... The extras are well done and informative, in some ways doing a much better job than the documentary of presenting facts about the series to a novice, who doesn't know a Companion from an Operative."

Adam Arseneau of DVD Verdict describes it as "the ultimate expression of fanboy love" and explains that the film is more about the fan community than a documentary about Firefly itself. He warns "this one is for fans only. Even then, it's a bit obsessive at times", but as a fan himself he enjoyed it. Scott Weinberg of eFilmCritic gave the film a positive review, writing that it was "an unapologetically geeky love-fest for one of the newest and most ardent fanbases on the planet: The Browncoats. Done the Impossible is basically a love letter from the fanbase to the fanbase, and I think it's pretty darn cool."

== Soundtrack ==
Track listing

1. "Done the Impossible (Ballad of Serenity)" – Rob Kuhlman
2. "Autumn in Asheville" (Instrumental) – Emerald Rose
3. "Gwydion's Song To Lleu" (Instrumental) – Emerald Rose
4. "The Fall of Serenity Valley" – Brobdingnagian Bards
5. "Take Me Down (To Her Water)" – Emerald Rose
6. "Urania Sings" (Instrumental) – Emerald Rose
7. "Deventure" – Vitulari
8. "Big Damn Heroes" (Instrumental) – Emerald Rose
9. "Firefly Main Title (The Ballad of Serenity)" – Emerald Rose
10. "Big Damn Trilogy" (Instrumental) – The Bedlam Bards
11. "Come to the Dance" (Instrumental) – Emerald Rose
12. "Sail the Sky" (Instrumental) – The Bedlam Bards
13. "The Rock Garden" – The Bedlam Bards
14. "I'm Gonna See Serenity" – Dan Sehane
15. "Big Damn Trilogy" – The Bedlam Bards
16. "Mal's Song" – Michelle Dockrey
17. "Big Damn Heroes" – Emerald Rose
18. "The Ballad of Lux" – The Bedlam Bards
19. "Mal's Song" (Instrumental) – Tony Fabris
20. "Done the Impossible" (Ballad of Serenity) (Instrumental) – Rob Kuhlman
