= Firefly (TV series) =

American space Western television series

- Genre: Space Western; Drama
- Created by: Joss Whedon
- Showrunner: Tim Minear
- Starring: Nathan Fillion; Gina Torres; Alan Tudyk; Morena Baccarin; Adam Baldwin; Jewel Staite; Sean Maher; Summer Glau; Ron Glass
- Theme music composer: Joss Whedon
- Opening theme: "The Ballad of Serenity" performed by Sonny Rhodes
- Composer: Greg Edmonson
- Country of origin: United States
- Original language: English
- No. of seasons: 1
- No. of episodes: 14

Production
- Executive producers: Joss Whedon; Tim Minear
- Producer: Ben Edlund
- Cinematography: David Boyd
- Editor: Lisa Lassek
- Camera setup: Single-camera
- Running time: 43–45 minutes
- Production companies: Mutant Enemy Productions; 20th Century Fox Television

Original release
- Network: Fox
- Release: September 20 – December 20, 2002

Related
- Serenity (film); Serenity (comics)

Firefly is a 2002 American space Western drama television series, created by writer and director Joss Whedon, under his Mutant Enemy Productions label. Whedon served as an executive producer, along with Tim Minear. The series is set in the year 2517, after the arrival of humans in a new star system, and follows the adventures of the renegade crew of Serenity, a "Firefly-class" spaceship. The ensemble cast portrays the nine characters living aboard Serenity. Whedon pitched the show as "nine people looking into the blackness of space and seeing nine different things."

The show explores the lives of a group of people, some of whom fought on the losing side of a civil war, making a living on the fringes of society as part of their star system's pioneer culture. The two surviving superpowers, the United States and China, united to form the central federal government, called the Alliance. According to Whedon's vision, "Nothing will change in the future: Technology will advance, but we will still have the same political, moral, and ethical problems as today."

Firefly premiered in the United States on the Fox network on September 20, 2002. By mid-December, it had averaged 4.7 million viewers per episode and was 98th in Nielsen ratings. It was canceled after 11 of the 14 produced episodes were aired. Despite its short run, it received strong sales when it was released on DVD and has large fan support campaigns. It won a Primetime Emmy Award in 2003 for Outstanding Special Visual Effects for a Series. TV Guide ranked it No. 5 on their 2013 list of 60 "shows that were canceled too soon".

The show's post-airing success led Whedon and Universal Pictures to produce Serenity, a 2005 film that continues the story from the series. The Firefly franchise expanded into other media, including comics and two tabletop role-playing games. On March 15, 2026, star Nathan Fillion confirmed that an animated series was in development with animation by ShadowMachine.

== Premise ==
=== Backstory ===
The series takes place in the year 2517, on a variety of planets with numerous habitable moons. The TV series does not reveal whether these celestial bodies are within one star system, only saying that Serenity's mode of propulsion through space is a "gravity-drive". Each episode begins with either Book or Captain Reynolds providing the backstory. Book's narration runs as follows:

After the Earth was used up, we found a new solar system, and hundreds of new Earths were terraformed and colonized. The central planets formed the Alliance and decided all the planets had to join under their rule. There was some disagreement on that point. After the war, many of the Independents who had fought and lost drifted to the edges of the system, far from Alliance control. Out here, people struggle to get by with the most basic technologies. A ship would bring you work. A gun would help you keep it. A captain's goal was simple: Find a crew. Find a job. Keep flying.

— Derrial Book, introductory narrative for the show

The film Serenity reveals that the planets and moons are in an extensive system, and production documents related to the film indicate that there is no faster-than-light travel in this universe. The characters occasionally refer to "Earth-that-was" and the film establishes that, long before the events in the series, a large population had emigrated from Earth to a new star system in generation ships: "Earth-that-was could no longer sustain our numbers, we were so many." The emigrants established themselves in this new star system, with "dozens of planets and hundreds of moons", and many of these were terraformed, a process that was only the first step in making a planet habitable. The outlying settlements often did not receive support in the construction of their civilizations. This resulted in many border planets and moons having forbidding, dry environments, well-suited to the Western genre.

=== Synopsis ===
The show takes its name from the "Firefly-class" spaceship Serenity that the central characters call home. The Firefly-class ship, some 40,000 still in use, is so named for the resemblance to the shape of a firefly, complete with a tail section that lights up during acceleration, analogous to the bioluminescent insect's abdomen. Serenity was named for the Battle of Serenity Valley, where Sergeant Malcolm Reynolds and Corporal Zoe Alleyne were among the survivors on the losing side. It is revealed in "Bushwhacked" that the Independents' loss at the Battle of Serenity Valley was widely considered as sealing their fate.

The Alliance governs the star system through an organization of core planets, following its success in forcibly unifying all the colonies under one government. DVD commentary suggests that the Alliance is composed of two primary systems, one predominantly Western, the other pan-Asian, explaining the blended linguistic and visual themes of the series. The central planets are firmly under Alliance control, but the outlying planets and moons resemble the American Old West, under little governmental authority. Settlers and refugees on the outlying worlds have relative freedom from the central government but lack the amenities of high-tech civilization found on inner worlds. The outlying areas of space ("the black") are inhabited by the Reavers, a cannibalistic group of nomadic humans.

The captain of Serenity is Malcolm "Mal" Reynolds. The episode "Serenity" establishes that the captain and his first mate Zoe Washburne (née Alleyne) are veteran "Browncoats" of the Unification War, a failed attempt by the outlying worlds to resist the Alliance. A later episode, "Out of Gas", reveals that Mal bought the spaceship Serenity to travel increasingly distant reaches of space, beyond Alliance control. Much of the crew's work consists of cargo runs or smuggling. In the original pilot, "Serenity", Simon joins the crew as a paying passenger, smuggling his sister River Tam aboard as cargo. River is a child prodigy whose brain was subjected to experiments by Alliance scientists at a secret government institution; she displays symptoms of schizophrenia and often hears voices. It is later revealed that she is a "reader", one who possesses telepathic abilities. Simon gave up a career as an eminent trauma surgeon in an Alliance hospital to rescue her, and they are fugitives. As Whedon states in an episode of a DVD commentary, every show he does is about creating a family. By the last episode, "Objects in Space", the fractured character of River has finally become whole, partly because the others decided to accept her into their "family" on the ship.

=== Signature show elements ===
The show blends elements from the space opera and Western genres in a grounded depiction of humanity's future. Firefly takes place in a multi-social future, primarily a fusion of Western and East Asian societies (and in particular those of mainland China), where there is gross class inequality. As a result of the Sino-American Alliance, Mandarin Chinese is a common second language; English-speaking characters in the show frequently curse in Mandarin.

The show features slang not used in contemporary culture, such as adaptations of modern words or new words. "Shiny" is frequently used as the real world slang "cool", and "gorram" is used as a mild swear word. Written and spoken Chinese, as well as Old West dialect, are also employed. As one reviewer noted: "The dialogue tended to be a bizarre purée of wisecracks, old-timey Western-paperback patois, and snatches of Chinese."

Tim Minear and Joss Whedon pointed out two scenes that articulated the show's mood clearly: In the original pilot "Serenity" when Mal is eating with chopsticks with a Western tin cup by his plate; and in "The Train Job" pilot when Mal is thrown out of a holographic bar window. The DVD set's "making-of" documentary explains the distinctive frontispiece of the series (wherein Serenity soars over a herd of horses) as Whedon's attempt to capture "everything you need to understand about the series in five seconds."

Whedon struggled with Fox over the tone of the show, and especially over the character of Malcolm Reynolds. Fox pressured Whedon to make Mal more "jolly", as they feared he was too dark in the original pilot, epitomized by the moment he suggests he might "space" Simon and River, throwing them out of the airlock. Fox was unhappy that the show portrayed "nobodies" who "get squished by policy" instead of actual policymakers.

== Cast ==
=== Main ===
Firefly maintained an ensemble cast that portrayed nine crew members and passengers of the ship, Serenity, dealing with criminals and schemers, Alliance security forces, the utterly psychotic and brutal Reavers, and the mysterious men with "hands of blue"—operatives of a secret agency possibly aligned with The Blue Sun Corporation. The crew is driven by the need to secure enough income to keep their ship operational while keeping a low profile to avoid their adversaries. Their situation is complicated by the differing motivations of the individuals aboard Serenity; the show's brief run hampered further characterization.

All nine of the main characters appeared in every episode, except "Ariel", from which Book is absent.

- Nathan Fillion as Malcolm "Mal" Reynolds—the owner and captain of Serenity and former Independent sergeant in the Battle of Serenity Valley. Malcolm grew up on a ranch and was raised by his mother and the ranch hands. In the Unification War, he fought as a platoon sergeant in the 57th Overlanders of the Independent Army, the "Browncoats". He is a cunning, capable leader, and a skilled fighter. Mal's primary motivation is a desire for independence. While he is not above petty theft, smuggling, or even killing to maintain his freedom, he is generally honest in his dealings with others, fiercely loyal to his crew, and adheres to a personal code of honor. He is openly antagonistic toward religion as a result of his experiences during the war.
- Gina Torres as Zoe Alleyne Washburne—second-in-command onboard Serenity, a loyal wartime friend of Captain Reynolds, and Wash's wife. Her surname during the Unification War was Alleyne. She was born and raised on a ship and served under Mal during the war as a corporal. Described by her husband as a "warrior woman", she is a capable fighter who keeps calm even in the most dangerous situations. She demonstrates an almost unconditional loyalty to Mal. The only exception noted being her marriage to Wash, which the captain claims was against his orders.
- Alan Tudyk as Hoban "Wash" Washburne—Serenity's pilot and Zoe's husband. Deeply in love with his wife, Wash expresses jealousy over his wife's "war buddy" relationship and unconditional support of their captain, most particularly in the episode "War Stories", in which he confronts Mal even as the two of them are being tortured. He joined pilot training just to see the stars, which were invisible from the surface of his polluted homeworld, and he joined Serenity despite being highly sought after by other ships. He is light-hearted and tends to make amusing comments, despite the severity of any situation.
- Morena Baccarin as Inara Serra—a Companion, which is the 26th century cross between a geisha, and a courtesan or mistress; she rents and works out of one of Serenity's two small shuttles. As a Companion, Inara enjoys high social standing. Her presence confers a degree of legitimacy and social acceptance that the crew of Serenity would not have without her on board. Inara displays great dignity, civility, and compassion. There is strong romantic tension between her and Mal, who share many character traits, but each frequently objects to the other's work as "whoring" or "petty theft", respectively. Both refuse to act on their feelings and attempt to keep their relationship professional.
- Adam Baldwin as Jayne Cobb—a mercenary who first met Mal on the opposite side of a dispute: Mal, while held at gunpoint by Jayne, offered Jayne his own bunk and a higher cut than his current employer, prompting Jayne to switch sides and shoot his then-partners. In the original pilot, "Serenity", he tells Mal that he did not betray him because "The money wasn't good enough." However, he had previously showed reluctance in betraying the captain to an Alliance agent. In "Ariel", he defends betraying Simon and River by claiming he had not intended to betray Mal. He can be depended on in a fight. Occasional hints of intelligence peek through his oafish façade, giving the impression that he acts dumber than he is. Whedon has stated several times that Jayne will ask the questions that no one else wants to. Even though he is a macho character, he has shown a particularly intense fear of Reavers, more so than the rest of the crew. He sends a significant portion of his income to his mother, again suggesting that there is more to his character than what he presents to the rest of the crew.
- Jewel Staite as Kaywinnet Lee "Kaylee" Frye—the ship's mechanic. In the episode "Out of Gas", Kaylee reveals she has had no formal training, but keeps Serenity running with an intuitive gift for the workings of mechanical equipment. Jewel Staite describes Kaylee's character as being wholesome, sweet, and "completely genuine in that sweetness", adding "She loves being on that ship. She loves all of those people. And she is the only one who loves all of them incredibly genuinely." She has a crush on Simon Tam. Kaylee is the heart of the ship; according to creator Joss Whedon, if Kaylee believes something, it is true.
- Sean Maher as Simon Tam—a trauma surgeon of the first caliber (ranked top 3% in his class at a top core-planet institution), who is on the run after breaking his sister River out of a government research facility. The episode "Safe", reveals that he and River had a privileged upbringing with access to the best education. By rescuing River in spite of his father's severe objections, Simon gave up a highly successful future in medicine. His bumbling attempts at a romantic relationship with Kaylee are a recurring subplot throughout the series. At every turn, he unwittingly foils his own attempts at romance. His life is defined by caring for his sister.
- Summer Glau as River Tam—smuggled onto the ship by her brother. She is a brilliant, compassionate, and intuitive child prodigy. Experiments and invasive brain surgery at an Alliance secret facility left her delusional, paranoid, and at times violent—though her uncanny ability to seemingly sense things before they happen leaves questions as to where the delusions end and reality begins. The experiments seem to have made her a psychic. The experiments also gave her an innate knack for hand-to-hand combat, and she is capable of killing or incapacitating several opponents in a fight with ease. She gets frequent fits of anxiety and experiences post-traumatic flashbacks of her time in the Alliance facility. Her mental instability and uncanny abilities, paired with several erratic and violent acts, are a recurring source of fear and doubt among the crew, especially with Jayne, whom she once slashed with a knife. Jayne frequently requests that River and Simon be taken off the ship.
- Ron Glass as Derrial Book—a Shepherd (equivalent to a pastor). Although presented as a devout Christian, Book has profound, unexplained knowledge about criminal activities, police corruption, and military strategy, tactics, and weapons. In "Safe", he was shown to have sufficient status in the Alliance to receive emergency medical treatment from an Alliance ship. He is also proficient in hand-to-hand combat and the use of firearms. He maintains his objection to violence even during a rescue mission, joining the fight while stating that although the Bible specifically disallows killing, it is "somewhat fuzzier on the subject of kneecaps." Book is a moral guide for Mal and the rest of the crew, a voice of reason, conscience, and spirituality. He also gets along well with the amoral mercenary Jayne, with the two spotting each other while working out using a bench press. His hidden backstory would have been gradually revealed had the series continued but was instead explored in the 2010 comic book The Shepherd's Tale.

=== Recurring ===
Despite the series' short run, several recurring characters emerged from the inhabitants of the Firefly universe:

- Mark Sheppard as Badger—an established smuggling middleman on the planet Persephone. He provided jobs for Serenity on at least two occasions. In the DVD commentary for the episode "Serenity", it was revealed that this part was initially written with Whedon himself playing the role. Badger appears in the original pilot "Serenity" and in "Shindig", with a return in the comic book series Serenity: Those Left Behind.
- Michael Fairman as Adelai Niska—a criminal kingpin with a reputation for violent reprisals, including severe, prolonged torture against those who fail him or even irritate him. He appears in "The Train Job" and "War Stories".
- Christina Hendricks as "Saffron"—a con artist whose real name is unknown. She first appeared in the episode "Our Mrs. Reynolds" as Mal's involuntarily acquired wife. She has a habit of marrying her marks in the process of scamming them. She returns in the episode "Trash", in which Mal jokingly addresses her as "YoSaffBridge", from the three of her aliases known within the show: "Yolanda", "Saffron", and "Bridget".
- Jeff Ricketts and Dennis Cockrum as "The Hands of Blue"–two unnamed men wearing suits and blue gloves who pursue River, apparently to return her to the institute from which she escaped, as shown in "The Train Job", "Ariel", and the Serenity: Those Left Behind comic. They kill anyone, including Alliance personnel, who had contact with her, using a mysterious hand-held device that causes fatal hemorrhaging in anyone at whom it is aimed. River, during anxiety attacks or psychological meltdowns, has repeated the phrase "Two by two/hands of blue". This suggests that River has had close experience(s) with them.

== Episodes ==
No.	Title	Directed by	Written by	Original release date	Prod. code	U.S. viewers (millions)
1	"Serenity"	Joss Whedon	Joss Whedon	December 20, 2002	1AGE79	4.16
Captain Malcolm "Mal" Reynolds and his crew aboard Serenity illegally salvage goods from a derelict ship. Because the Alliance marked the goods, and an Alliance ship spotted an obsolete Firefly-class freighter leaving the scene, Mal's fence Badger refuses to handle the goods and Mal has to sell elsewhere. To make extra money, the crew picks up passengers: Shepherd Book, Simon Tam and Lawrence Dobson. En route to the new buyer, Patience, Dobson turns out to be an undercover Alliance agent tracking Simon. Dobson attempts to arrest Simon, but he is taken prisoner. Simon reveals that his genius sister River Tam, hidden in his luggage, was experimented on by the Alliance and that he is trying to smuggle her to safety. Patience tries to rob Mal, but he takes the payment after a shootout. Lawrence escapes and holds River hostage, but Mal shoots him and offers Simon and River haven aboard Serenity.
2	"The Train Job"	Joss Whedon	Joss Whedon & Tim Minear	September 20, 2002	1AGE01	6.20
Crime lord Adelai Niska hires the crew to rob a train of unspecified goods. The crew can transfer the goods to Serenity flying above, but Mal and Zoe Washburne are forced to stay behind on the train. They learn that they have stolen medicine desperately needed by the locals. The crew argues whether they should deliver the goods to Niska. Ultimately, they decide to rescue Mal and Zoe first through subterfuge. Mal decides to return the medicine. However, Niska's thugs track them down. After killing some of them and capturing the rest, Mal and Zoe take medicine to those in need of it and refund Niska's money.
3	"Bushwhacked"	Tim Minear	Tim Minear	September 27, 2002	1AGE02	5.47
The crew discovers a derelict ship that was attacked by Reavers and take aboard the sole survivor. Shortly after, an Alliance cruiser orders Serenity to dock to it. Simon and River hide to avoid capture. The rest of the crew are interrogated. Refusing to believe in the existence of Reavers, the Alliance's Commander Harken decides that the crew will be charged with attacking the ship and murdering its settler passengers. However, the survivor kills some of the Alliance crew and escapes back to Serenity. Mal convinces Harken to let him help find the survivor. Mal kills the survivor, saving Harken's life in the process, and the crew is released.
4	"Shindig"	Vern Gillum	Jane Espenson	November 1, 2002	1AGE03	4.28
Inara Serra is hired by Atherton Wing, one of her regular clients, and accompanies him to a formal dance. Badger hires Mal to meet a contact at the same dance and try to set up a smuggling job. When Mal hits Atherton for the way he treats Inara, Mal finds he has unknowingly challenged Atherton to a duel with swords. Atherton is a skilled swordsman and duelist. Inara tries to teach Mal how to use a sword overnight. Despite all expectations, Mal wins the duel. The contact, who personally dislikes Atherton, agrees to hire the crew to smuggle cattle to the Rim.
5	"Safe"	Michael Grossman	Drew Z. Greenberg	November 8, 2002	1AGE04	4.68
The crew delivers cattle to the Rim, but Book is gravely injured when they are stuck in the middle of a shootout. At the same time, Simon and River Tam are kidnapped by locals while sightseeing in town. Mal chooses to leave the Tams behind to seek help for Book. Desperate, they turn to an Alliance ship. At first hostile, the Alliance officer they speak to provides medical aid after seeing Book's ID. Meanwhile, the kidnappers belong to a community in desperate need of an actual doctor, and Simon tentatively hopes he has found a haven for himself and River. However, the religious residents believe River is a witch and attempt to burn her at the stake. Serenity returns just in time to rescue the siblings. When Simon asks Mal why he came back, the captain tells Simon that he and River are part of the crew.
6	"Our Mrs. Reynolds"	Vondie Curtis Hall	Joss Whedon	October 4, 2002	1AGE05	4.87
After completing a job for a small settlement, during the ensuing celebration, Mal learns that he inadvertently married a young woman called Saffron, part of the payment. Although Mal insists they are not married, Saffron is determined to fulfill a subservient wife's role. Saffron is not what she appears to be. She later knocks Mal out, locks the ship into a course for murderous ship scrappers, and flees in a shuttle. The crew barely escapes.
7	"Jaynestown"	Marita Grabiak	Ben Edlund	October 18, 2002	1AGE06	4.30
The crew lands on a planet to meet a contact. Although Jayne Cobb insists he is wanted there, they are dumbfounded to learn that the locals revere him as a folk hero. Mal attempts to use Jayne's status as a distraction to move smuggled goods across town. However, Magistrate Higgins releases Jayne's former accomplice Stitch Hessian, whom Jayne abandoned years ago during a botched robbery and now seeks revenge. Stitch publicly confronts Jayne, revealing what the townspeople believe happened to be false. Stitch shoots, but a villager jumps in front of Jayne and dies. Jayne kills Stitch and urges the townspeople to stop viewing him as a hero. Serenity is "land-locked" by Higgins' order to try to capture Jayne. Higgins' 26-year-old son Fess, encouraged by Inara to stand up for himself after losing his virginity to her, as paid for by Magistrate Higgins, orders the unlocking of the ship, and Serenity departs.
8	"Out of Gas"	David Solomon	Tim Minear	October 25, 2002	1AGE07	4.38
An explosion in the engine room leaves Serenity with a dead engine and inoperative life support system, and no backup options. With only a few hours of oxygen left, Mal has the crew leave in the two shuttles while he remains aboard with hope to contact a passing ship. In a series of flashbacks, Mal convinces Zoe, Jayne, Inara, Hoban Washburne, and Kaylee Frye to join his crew. In the present, Mal hails a ship and secures the part needed to fix the engine, though he is shot by the other ship's captain in a failed attempt to take over Serenity. In what appears to be his final act, Mal repairs the ship and collapses. The crew returns to Serenity in time to save Mal's life.
9	"Ariel"	Allan Kroeker	Jose Molina	November 15, 2002	1AGE08	4.49
While waiting on the Core planet Ariel, Simon hires the crew to help him smuggle River into a local hospital for a thorough diagnostic. In return, he will tell them how to loot the hospital for valuable medicine. Once inside, Jayne attempts to turn in Simon and River for the reward. However, the Alliance officer arrests Jayne as well to keep the bounty for himself. The crew escapes, but Mal realizes that Jayne betrayed Simon and River. Mal arranges for Jayne to suffocate when Serenity leaves the planet's atmosphere, but then lets him live when he shows remorse.
10	"War Stories"	James Contner	Cheryl Cain	December 6, 2002	1AGE09	3.85
Angry that Zoe and Mal have an unshakeable bond as war veterans, her husband Wash demands to take her place on a seemingly routine mission. Mal begrudgingly allows Wash to go along. They are captured by Niska, out to restore his reputation after they failed to complete the robbery he commissioned in "The Train Job". Zoe has only enough money to ransom one of them. She unhesitatingly chooses Wash. The crew band together to rescue Mal.
11	"Trash"	Vern Gillum	Ben Edlund & Jose Molina	July 21, 2003 (UK)	1AGE12	N/A
When Saffron crosses paths with Mal again, she asks him to help her rob a precious antique weapon from a wealthy man. Once Mal and Saffron are inside, they are discovered, and it is revealed that the man is married to Saffron. Although the man seems initially oblivious, he is aware of Saffron's true nature and called the authorities. Mal and Saffron escape, but Saffron betrays Mal, stranding him naked in the desert, and tries to pick up the weapon. However, Inara gets there first. She leaves Saffron locked up in a storage container for the authorities, and the crew escapes with the weapon.
12	"The Message"	Tim Minear	Joss Whedon & Tim Minear	July 28, 2003 (UK)	1AGE13	N/A
Mal and Zoe receive in the mail the body of Tracey, a comrade-in-arms who fought with them at the Battle of Du-Khang, and they attempt to honor his recorded wish to be returned home. However, a corrupt Alliance officer demands they turn over the body and the goods the soldier was smuggling. While searching the body for clues, they learn that Tracey is still alive and is smuggling organs. Tracey had double-crossed his employers, but they killed his new buyer. Mal is ultimately forced to kill him to protect the crew, and Book blackmails the officer into leaving. Mal and Zoe take Tracey's body home to his family.
13	"Heart of Gold"	Thomas J. Wright	Brett Matthews	August 4, 2003 (UK)	1AGE10	N/A
Nandi, an old friend of Inara's and a former Companion, runs an unlicensed bordello on a barren planet. The bordello is frequently patronized by Rance Burgess, a tyrannical ruler who keeps the community excessively poor so that he can govern it as a cowboy. Burgess, whose wife is infertile, believes a pregnant prostitute named Petaline is carrying his child. With Burgess promising to take the child once it is born, Nandi contacts Inara and asks her if the Serenity crew can help defend her establishment. Mal agrees, but upon arrival realizes that Burgess' cavalry is too powerful to fight and advises Nandi and her working girls to leave the planet immediately. Nandi refuses to lose her establishment to Burgess, and her resolve impresses Mal enough to encourage the crew to stay and fight Burgess. Nandi and Mal sleep together, and Petaline's child is born. Although Inara is outwardly pleased that Mal has put his intimacy issues aside, secretly she is heartbroken that her attraction is unrequited. With the help from the crew, Burgess's forces are defeated, and Petaline kills Burgess, but Nandi is killed in battle. Later, Inara confesses to Mal that she wants to leave Serenity.
14	"Objects in Space"	Joss Whedon	Joss Whedon	December 13, 2002	1AGE11	4.08
River telepathically hears the crewmembers' innermost feelings. When she picks up a gun in Serenity's cargo bay (which she perceives as a tree branch), the others discuss if she's too dangerous to be kept aboard. Bounty hunter Jubal Early sneaks aboard the ship, intent on claiming the bounty set for River and Simon. Early incapacitates the crew and forces Simon to help him locate River, who has seemingly vanished. While searching the ship, Early recites existential philosophy, claiming to not be evil, simply incentivized to do what is necessary. River's voice appears on the PA system, claiming that River melted and fused with Serenity. Early is disbelieving, but the voice is omniscient, knowing extensive details of Early's delinquent behaviour. The voice muses that Early enjoys violence and is not merely incentivized to be violent. Secretly, the voice individually mobilizes the crew in a plot to force Early off the ship. Early realizes River has snuck aboard his own spacecraft. River tells him she will go willingly. Heading back to his craft to join her, Early is ambushed by Mal, who pushes him away into space – carrying out River's plan. River is embraced by the crew. Early floats alone in space.

== Production ==
=== Origin ===
Whedon developed the concept for the show after reading The Killer Angels by Michael Shaara chronicling the Battle of Gettysburg during the American Civil War. He wanted to follow people who had fought on the losing side of a war, their experiences afterward as pioneers and immigrants on the outskirts of civilization, much like the post-American Civil War era of Reconstruction and the American Old West. He intended the show to be "a Stagecoach kind of drama with a lot of people trying to figure out their lives in a bleak pioneer environment". Whedon wanted to develop a show about the tactile nature of life, a show where existence was more physical and more difficult. Whedon also read a book about Jewish partisan fighters in World War II. Whedon wanted to create something for television that was more character-driven and gritty than most modern science fiction. Television science fiction, he felt, had become too pristine and rarefied. Whedon wanted to give the show a name that indicated movement and power and felt that "Firefly" had both. This powerful word's relatively insignificant meaning, Whedon felt, added to its allure. He eventually created a ship in the image of a firefly.

=== Format ===
During the pilot episode filming, Whedon was still arguing with Fox that the show should be displayed in widescreen format. Whedon filmed scenes with actors on the edge of both sides so that they could only be shown in widescreen. This led to a few scenes on the DVD (and later Blu-ray) where objects or setups that were not visible in the original 4:3 broadcasts were displayed—such as the scene in the pilot where Wash mimes controlling the ship with a non-existent yoke. The Fox executives rejected the pilot, who felt that it lacked action and that the captain was too "dour". They also disliked a scene in which the crew backed down to a crime boss since the scene implied the crew was "being nothing". Fox told Whedon on a Friday afternoon that he had to submit a new pilot script on Monday morning or the show would not be picked up. Whedon and Tim Minear closeted themselves for the weekend to write what became the new pilot, "The Train Job". At the direction of Fox, they added "larger than life" characters such as the henchman "Crow" and the "hands of blue" men, who also introduced an X-Files-type ending.

For the new pilot, Fox made it clear that they would not air the episodes in widescreen. Whedon and company felt they had to "serve two masters" by filming widescreen for eventual DVD release but keeping objects in-frame so it could still work when aired in pan and scan full frame. To obtain an immersive and immediate feel, the episodes were filmed in a documentary style with hand-held cameras, giving them the look of "found footage", with deliberately mis-framed and out-of-focus subjects. As Whedon related: "don't be arch, don't be sweeping—be found, be rough and tumble and docu[mentary] and you-are-there". Computer-generated scenes mimicked the motion of a hand-held camera; the style was not used when shooting scenes that involved the central government, the Alliance. Tracking and steady cameras were used to show the sterility of this aspect of the Firefly universe. Another style employed was lens flares harking back to 1970s television. The need for this particular style resulted in the director of photography (David Boyd) favoring cheaper lenses over cutting-edge equipment. Firefly portrays space as silent, as sounds cannot be transmitted in the vacuum of space.

=== Set design ===
The spacecraft Serenity was digitally rendered by special effects house Zoic Studios. The shape was inspired by the shape of the firefly insect, and its tail section lights up in imitation of it.

Production designer Carey Meyer built the ship Serenity in two parts (one for each level) as a complete set with ceilings and practical lighting installed, as part of the set that the cameras could use along with moveable parts. The two-part set also allowed the second unit to shoot in one section while the actors and first unit worked undisturbed in the other. As Whedon recalled: "you could pull it away or move something huge so that you could get in and around everything. That meant the environment worked for us and there weren't a lot of adjustments that needed to be made". This design allowed the viewers to feel they were really in a ship. For Whedon, the design of the ship was crucial in defining the known space for the viewer and that there were not "fourteen hundred decks and a holodeck and an all-you-can-eat buffet in the back." He wanted to convey that it was utilitarian and "beat-up but lived-in. Ultimately, it was home." Each room represented a feeling or character, usually conveyed by the paint color. He explains that the colors and mood progress from extremely warm to cooler, as you move from the back of the ship in the engine room, toward the front of the ship to the bridge. Besides evoking a mood associated with the character who spends the most time in each area, the color scheme also alludes to the heat generated in the ship's tail. Whedon was keen on using vertical space; having the crew quarters accessible by ladder was important. The set design allowed the actors to stay in the moment and interact, without having to stop after each shot and set up for the next, helping contribute to the documentary style Whedon aimed for.

The set had several influences, including the sliding doors and tiny cubicles reminiscent of Japanese hotels. Artist Larry Dixon has noted that the cargo bay walls are "reminiscent of interlaced, overlapping Asian designs, cleverly reminding us of the American-Chinese Alliance setting while artistically forming a patterned plane for background scale reference." Dixon has also remarked on how the set design contributed to the storytelling through the use of color, depth, composition, lighting, as well as its use of diagonals and patterned shadows.

Their small budget was another reason to use the ship for much of the storytelling. When the characters did leave the ship, the worlds all had Earth atmosphere and coloring because the production team could not afford to design alien worlds. "I didn't want to go to Yucca Flats every other episode and transform it into Bizarro World by making the sky orange", recalled Whedon. As Meyer recalled: "I think in the end the feel was that we wound up using a lot of places or exteriors that just felt too Western and we didn't necessarily want to go that way; but at some point, it just became the lesser of two evils—what could we actually create in three days?"

=== Music ===
Firefly

Soundtrack album by Greg Edmonson, Joss Whedon
- Released: November 8, 2005
- Genres: Classical, Country
- Length: 60:15
- Label: Varèse Sarabande

Professional ratings
Review scores
Source	Rating
AllMusic	/
SoundtrackNet	3.5/5 stars

Greg Edmonson composed the musical score for the series. He stated that he wrote for the emotion of the moment. A reviewer stated that he also wrote for the characters: "Edmonson has developed a specialized collection of musical symbolism for the series." To help illustrate the collection, the reviewer gave leitmotifs, or "signatures", various names, noting that "Serenity" recalls the theme of the show and is used when they return to the ship, or when they were meeting in secret; it was "the sound of their home". The slide guitar and fiddle used in this piece are portable instruments that fit the lifestyle of the crew: "the music they make calls up tunes played out in the open, by people who were hundreds of miles away yesterday. 'Serenity' conjures the nomadic lifestyle the crew leads and underlines the western aspect of the show." Another emotional signature was "Sad Violin" used at the end of the Battle of Serenity Valley but also to set up the joke when Mal tells Simon that Kaylee is dead in the episode "Serenity". The most memorable use of "Sad Violin" is at the end of "The Message", when the crew mourned the death of Tracey. This was also the last scene of the last episode the actors shot, and so this was seen by them and Edmonson, as Firefly's farewell. To denote danger, "Peril" was used, which is "a low pulse, like a heartbeat, with deep chimes and low strings". The reviewer also noted character signatures. The criminal Niska has a signature: Eastern European or Middle Eastern melodies over a low drone. Simon and River's signature was a piano played sparsely with a violin in the background. This contrasts with the portable instruments of "Serenity": the piano is an instrument that cannot be easily moved and evokes the image of "the distant house and family they both long for." The signatures were mostly established in the first pilot, "Serenity", and helped enhance the narrative.

In every episode, the musical score intensified my experience of this intelligent, remarkable show. Using and combining all these signatures, Greg Edmonson brought out aspects of Firefly's story and characters that were never explicitly revealed in the other elements of the series.

Whedon's use of music in his television shows has been regarded as "filmic", as during pivotal moments the music reminds viewers of earlier events, resulting in a tighter continuity throughout the season.

The musical score expressed the social fusion depicted in the show. Cowboy guitar blended with Asian influence produced the atmospheric background for the series. As one reviewer stated:

Old music from the future—the music of roaring campfires and racous [sic] cowboys mixed with the warm, pensive sounds of Asian culture and, occasionally, a cold imperial trumpet, heralding the ominous structural presence of a domineering government. Completely thrilling.

— Steve Townsley

The show's theme song, "The Ballad of Serenity", was written by Joss Whedon and performed by Sonny Rhodes. Whedon wrote the song before the series was greenlit, and a preliminary recording performed by Whedon can be found on the DVD release. The soundtrack to the series was released on CD on November 8, 2005, by Varèse Sarabande. Fox Music released a 40-minute soundtrack in September 2005 as a digital EP. "The Ballad of Serenity" was used by NASA as the wake-up song for astronaut Robert L. Behnken and the other crewmembers of STS-130 on February 12, 2010.

Track listing (tracks 1–17 appear in both the digital and CD releases)
No.	Title	Length
1.	"Firefly — Main Title"	0:52
2.	"Big Bar Fight" (from "The Train Job")	1:56
3.	"Heart of Gold Montage" (from "Heart of Gold")	2:10
4.	"Whitefall/Book" (from "Serenity", "The Message")	2:20
5.	"Early Takes Serenity" (from "Objects in Space")	2:36
6.	"The Funeral" (from "The Message")	2:36
7.	"River's Perception/Saffron" (from "Objects in Space", "Our Mrs. Reynolds")	2:14
8.	"Mal Fights Niska/Back Home" (from "War Stories", "Shindig")	1:54
9.	"River Tricks Early" (from "Objects in Space")	3:30
10.	"River Understands Simon" (from "Safe")	2:04
11.	"Leaving/Caper/Spaceball" (from "Trash", "Objects in Space", "Bushwhacked")	2:39
12.	"River's Afraid/Niska/Torture" (from "Ariel", "The Train Job", "War Stories")	3:21
13.	"In My Bunk/Jayne's Statue/Boom" (from "War Stories", "Jaynestown", "Bushwhacked")	2:28
14.	"Inara's Suite" (from "The Train Job", "Serenity", "War Stories")	3:29
15.	"Out of Gas/Empty Derelict" (from "Out of Gas", "Bushwhacked")	1:50
16.	"Book's Hair/Ready for Battle" (from "Jaynestown", "Heart of Gold")	1:59
17.	"Tears/River's Eyes" (from "Serenity", "Objects in Space")	1:59
18.	"Cows/New Dress/My Crew" (from "Safe", "Shindig")	2:11
19.	"Boarding the Serenity/Derelict" (from "War Stories", "Bushwhacked")	2:02
20.	"Burgess Kills/Captain & Ship" (from "Heart of Gold", "Out of Gas")	3:26
21.	"Saved/Isn't Home?/Reavers" (from "Out of Gas", "The Train Job", "Serenity")	2:55
22.	"Reavers Chase Serenity" (from "Serenity")	3:22
23.	"River's Dance" (from "Safe")	1:50
24.	"Inside the Tam House" (from "Safe")	2:22
25.	"Dying Ship/Naked Mal" (from "Out of Gas", "Trash")	2:10

=== Casting ===
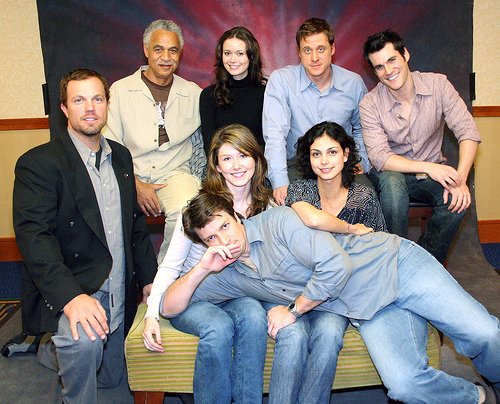
(From left to right, top to bottom) Ron Glass, Summer Glau, Alan Tudyk, Sean Maher, Adam Baldwin, Jewel Staite, Morena Baccarin, and Nathan Fillion: eight of the nine main actors in 2005 (not pictured: Gina Torres)

The series was picked up in December 2001, and casting started in January 2002. In casting his nine-member crew, Whedon looked first at the actors and considered their chemistry with others. Cast member Sean Maher recalls, "So then he just sort of put us all together, and I think it was very quick like right out of the gate, we all instantly bonded." All nine cast members were chosen before filming began; while making the original pilot "Serenity", Whedon decided that Rebecca Gayheart was unsuitable for the role of Inara Serra, and shot her scenes in singles so that it would be easier to replace her. Morena Baccarin auditioned for the role and two days later was on the set in her first television show. "Joss brought me down from the testing room like a proud dad, holding my hand and introducing me", Baccarin recalled.

Whedon approached Nathan Fillion to play the lead role of Malcolm Reynolds; after Whedon explained the premise and showed him the treatment for the pilot, Fillion was eager for the role. Fillion was called back several times to read for the part before he was cast. He noted that "it was really thrilling. It was my first lead, and I was pretty nervous, but I really wanted that part, and I wanted to tell those stories." Fillion later said he was "heartbroken" when he learned the series had been canceled. Fillion has called his time on Firefly the best acting job he ever had, and compares every job he has had to it.

Alan Tudyk applied through a casting office and several months later was called in for an audition, where he met with Whedon. He was called back to test with two candidates for the role of Zoe (Wash's wife) and was told that it was down to him and one other candidate. The Zoes he tested with were not selected (Gina Torres eventually received the role), and Tudyk was sent home but received a call informing him he had the part anyway. His audition tape is included in the special features of the DVD release.

Gina Torres, a veteran of several science fiction/fantasy works (Cleopatra 2525, The Matrix Reloaded, Alias, Hercules: The Legendary Journeys), was at first uninterested in doing another science fiction show but "was won over by the quality of the source material". As she recalled, "you had these challenged characters inhabiting a challenging world, and that makes for great storytelling. And no aliens!"

For Adam Baldwin, who grew up watching westerns, the role of Jayne Cobb was particularly resonant.

Canadian actress Jewel Staite videotaped her audition from Vancouver and was asked to come to Los Angeles to meet Whedon, at which point she was cast for the role of Kaylee Frye, the ship's engineer. She was asked to put on weight for the role.

Sean Maher recalls reading for the part and liking the character of Simon Tam, but that it was Whedon's personality and vision that "sealed the deal" for him. Neil Patrick Harris also read for the part of Simon.

For the role of Simon's sister, River Tam, Whedon called in Summer Glau for an audition and test the same day. Glau had first worked for Whedon in the Angel episode "Waiting in the Wings". Two weeks later, Whedon called her to tell her she had the part.

Veteran television actor Ron Glass has said that until Firefly, he had not experienced or sought a science-fiction or western role. Still, he fell in love with the pilot script and the character of Shepherd Book.

=== Production staff ===
Whedon selected Tim Minear to be the show runner, who served as the head writer and production leader. According to Whedon, "[Minear] understood the show as well as any human being, and just brought so much to it that I think of it as though he were always a part of it." Many of the other production staff were people Whedon had worked with in the past, except the director of photography David Boyd, who was the "big find" and who was "full of joy and energy".

The writers were selected after interviews and script samplings. Among the writers were José Molina, Ben Edlund, Cheryl Cain, Brett Matthews, Drew Z. Greenberg and Jane Espenson. Espenson wrote an essay on the writing process with Mutant Enemy Productions. A meeting was held and an idea was floated, generally by Whedon, and the writers brainstormed to develop the central theme of the episode and the character development. Next, the writers (except the one working on the previous week's episode) met in the anteroom to Whedon's office to begin breaking the story into acts and scenes. One of the key components to devising acts for the team was deciding when to break for commercial and ensuring the viewer returned. "Finding these moments in the story help give it shape: think of them as tentpoles that support the structure." For instance, in "Shindig", the break for commercial occurs when Malcolm Reynolds is gravely injured and losing the duel. "It does not end when Mal turns the fight around when he stands victorious over his opponent. They're both big moments, but one of them leaves you curious, and the other doesn't."

Next, the writers developed the scenes onto a marker-filled whiteboard, featuring "a brief ordered description of each scene". A writer was selected to create an outline of the episode's concept—occasionally with some dialogue and jokes—in one day. The outline was given to showrunner Tim Minear, who revised it within a day. The writer used the revised outline to write the first draft of the script while the other writers developed the next. This first draft was usually submitted for revision within three to fourteen days; afterward, a second and sometimes third draft was written. After all modifications were made, the final draft would be produced as the "shooting draft".

=== Costume ===
Jill Ohanneson, Firefly's original costume designer, brought on Shawna Trpcic as her assistant for the pilot. When the show was picked up, Ohanneson was involved in another job and declined Firefly, suggesting Trpcic for the job.

The costumes were chiefly influenced by World War II, the American Civil War, the American Old West, and 1861 samurai Japan. Trpcic used deep reds and oranges for the main cast to express a feeling of "home" and contrasted that with grays and cool blues for the Alliance. Since the characters were often getting shot, Trpcic would make up to six versions of the same costume for multiple takes.

- For River, mostly jewel tones were used to set her apart from the rest of the Serenity crew. River had boots to contrast with the soft fabrics of her clothes, "because that's who she is—she's this soft, beautiful, sensitive girl, but with this hardcore inner character", recalled Trpcic.
- The designers also wanted to contrast Simon, River's brother, with the rest of the crew. Whereas they were dressed in cotton, Simon wore wool, stiff fabrics, satins, and silk. He was originally the "dandy", but as the show progressed, he loosened up slightly.
- For Kaylee, Trpcic studied Japanese and Chinese youth, as originally the character was Asian. Other inspirations for Kaylee's costumes were Rosie the Riveter and Chinese Communist posters.
- Inara's costumes reflect her high status and are very feminine and attractive.
- Trpcic designed and created the clothes for the minor character of Badger with Joss Whedon in mind since he intended to play that part. When Mark Sheppard played the role instead, he could fit into the clothes made for Whedon.
- For the Alliance, besides the grays and cool blues, Trpcic had in mind Nazi Germany, but mixed it with different wars, as the first sketches were "too Nazi". The uniforms of the Alliance soldiers are from the 1997 film Starship Troopers.
- In the commentary for the pilot episode, Whedon points out that "bad guys wear hats, good guys don't."

=== Unproduced episodes ===
Since the cancellation of the series, various cast and crew members have revealed details they had planned for the show's future:

- Alan Tudyk had the idea for an episode about a planet that is always day on one side and night on the other. On the night side, Jayne accidentally spills a type of pheromone on himself and the crew, which attracts many dogs. The crew is chased back to the ship by these dogs. There River uses her mind powers to domesticate the dogs.
- Adam Baldwin wanted to make an episode in which Jayne goes up against Mal as captain of his ship.
- Tim Minear revealed the secret of Inara's syringe, as seen in the pilot episode; she is infected with a deadly disease. There would have been an episode where Reavers gang-rape her. Because she injected herself with the syringe, all of the Reavers on the ship die.
- According to Nathan Fillion, there was an episode in which the crew land on a dying planet. The inhabitants try to steal Serenity after explaining to the crew about their need to get off the planet. The problem is that unless they were to run into another ship along the way, with the extra passengers, Serenity would not have enough fuel and oxygen to make it to the closest destination. While everyone else is asleep, Mal takes the ship himself and discovers that help would never have arrived.

== Broadcast history ==
Firefly consists of a two-hour pilot and thirteen one-hour episodes (with commercials). The series originally premiered in the United States on Fox in September 2002 on Friday nights. Three episodes, including the original pilot, were aired out of the production order. Although Whedon had designed the show to run for seven years, low ratings resulted in cancellation by Fox in December 2002 after only 11 of the 14 completed episodes aired in the United States. The three episodes unaired by Fox eventually debuted in 2003 on the Sci Fi Channel in the United Kingdom. Prior to cancellation, some fans, worried about low ratings, formed the online Firefly Immediate Assistance campaign whose goal was to support the production of the show by sending in postcards to Fox. After it was canceled, the campaign worked on getting another network such as UPN to pick up the series. The campaign was unsuccessful in securing the show's continuation.

The A.V. Club cited several actions by the Fox network that contributed to the show's failure, most notably airing the episodes out of sequence, making the plot more difficult to follow. The double episode "Serenity" was intended as the premiere, and therefore contained most of the character introductions and back-story. Fox decided that "Serenity" was unsuitable for opening the series, and "The Train Job" was specifically created to act as a new pilot. In addition, Firefly was promoted as an action-comedy rather than the more serious character study it was intended to be, and the showbiz trade paper Variety noted Fox's decision to occasionally preempt the show for sporting events.

Fox remastered the complete series in 1080i high-definition for broadcast on Universal HD, which began in April 2008.

On March 12, 2009, the series was the winner of the first annual Hulu awards in the category "Shows We'd Bring Back".

The Science Channel began airing the series on March 6, 2011. All episodes aired in the intended order, including episodes "Trash", "The Message" and "Heart of Gold", which were not aired in the original Fox series run. Along with each episode, Dr. Michio Kaku provided commentary about the real-life science behind the show's science fiction.

== Home media ==
A box set containing the 14 completed episodes (including those which had not yet aired in the United States) was released on region 1 DVD on December 9, 2003; region 2 on April 19, 2004; and region 4 on August 2, 2004. The box features the episodes in the original order in which the show's producers had intended them to be broadcast, as well as seven episode commentaries, outtakes, and other features. The DVDs feature the episodes as they were shot in 16:9 widescreen, with anamorphic transfers and Dolby Surround audio. By September 2005, its DVD release had sold about 500,000 copies.

The series was re-released on Blu-ray Disc on November 11, 2008, comprising three discs; exclusive extras to the Blu-ray release include extra audio commentary from Joss Whedon, Nathan Fillion, Alan Tudyk, and Ron Glass for the episode "Our Mrs. Reynolds"; as well as an additional featurette, "Firefly" Reunion: Lunch with Joss, Nathan, Alan and Ron. On September 19, 2017, the series was reissued on Blu-ray as a 15th Anniversary Collection. The set included new packaging that came with character cards and a fold-out map of the planetary system in which the series is set.

Firefly: The Complete Series
Set details: 14 episodes; 4 disc set (3 disc Blu-ray); Features: Anamorphic widescreen (1.78:1 aspect ratio); Dolby Digital 5.1 (DVD); DTS-HD Master Audio 5.1 (Blu-ray); Subtitles vary depending on region		Bonus features: Audio commentary on "Serenity" by writer/director Joss Whedon and actor Nathan Fillion; Audio commentary on "The Train Job" by co-writer/director Joss Whedon and co-writer Tim Minear; Audio commentary on "Shindig" by writer Jane Espenson, actress Morena Baccarin and costume designer Shawna Trpcic; Audio commentary on "Our Mrs. Reynolds" by writer Joss Whedon and actors Nathan Fillion, Alan Tudyk and Ron Glass (Blu-ray exclusive); Audio commentary on "Out of Gas" by writer Tim Minear and director David Solomon; Audio commentary on "War Stories" by actors Nathan Fillion and Alan Tudyk; Audio commentary on "The Message" by actors Alan Tudyk and Jewel Staite; Audio commentary on "Objects in Space" by writer/director Joss Whedon; Four deleted scenes; "Here's How it Was: The Making of Firefly" featurette; "Serenity: The Tenth Character" featurette; Joss' Tour of the Set; Firefly Reunion: Lunch with Joss, Nathan, Alan, and Ron (Blu-ray exclusive); Alan Tudyk's audition; Gag Reel; Joss Sings the Firefly theme; Easter Egg: Adam Baldwin sings "Hero of Canton"	
Release dates:	Region 1	Region 2	Region 4
Release dates:	December 9, 2003; November 11, 2008 (Blu-ray)	April 19, 2004; September 19, 2011 (Blu-ray)	August 2, 2004; December 3, 2008 (Blu-ray)

== Reception ==
=== Critical response ===
On Rotten Tomatoes, the series has an approval rating of 77% with an average score of 7.8 out of 10 based on 44 reviews. The website's critical consensus reads, "Firefly earns its audience's adoration with the help of Nathan Fillion's dry delivery, a detailed fantasy world, and compelling storylines – even if it doesn't stand with creator Joss Whedon's most consistent work." Review aggregator Metacritic collected 30 reviews and calculated an average score of 63 out of 100, indicating "generally favorable reviews".

Many reviews focused on the show's fusion of Wild West and outer space motifs. TV Guide's Matt Roush, for instance, called the show "oddball" and "offbeat" and noted how the series took the metaphor of space operas as Westerns. Roush opined that the shift from space travel to horseback was "jarring", but that once he got used to this, he found the characters cleverly conceived and the writing a crisp balance of action, tension, and humor. Several reviewers criticized the show's setting; Tim Goodman of the San Francisco Chronicle felt that the melding of the western and science fiction genres was a "forced hodgepodge of two alarmingly opposite genres just for the sake of being different" and called the series a "vast disappointment", and Carina Chocano of Salon said that while the "space as Wild West" metaphor is fairly redundant, neither genre connected to the present. Emily Nussbaum of The New York Times, reviewing the DVD set, noted that the program featured "an oddball genre mix that might have doomed it from the beginning: it was a character-rich sci-fi western comedy-drama with existential underpinnings, a hard sell during a season dominated by Joe Millionaire".

The Boston Globe described Firefly as a "wonderful, imaginative mess brimming with possibility". The review further notes the difference between the new series and other programs was that those shows "burst onto the scene with slick pilots and quickly deteriorate into mediocrity ... Firefly is on the opposite creative journey." Jason Snell called the show one of the best on television, and one "with the most potential for future brilliance".

Tim White, writing for The Objective Standard, focused his review on the show's depiction of heroism. He concludes that "Firefly is not perfectly accurate in its attempts to depict the essential natures of heroism and villainy, but its successes are much more uplifting than its failures are problematic. It's also consistently funny, skillfully written, and passionately acted."

Reviewers compared Firefly to Whedon's other series, Buffy the Vampire Slayer. Chocano noted that the series lacks the psychological tension of Buffy and suggests that this might be attributable to the episodes being aired out of order. MSN Entertainment, on the other hand, pointed out that after viewing the DVD boxed set, it was easy to see why the program had attracted many die-hard fans, saying: "All of Whedon's fingerprints are there: the witty dialogue, the quirky premises and dark exploration of human fallacy that made Buffy brilliant found their way to this space drama". Reviewers also drew comparisons and parallels between Firefly and the anime media mix Outlaw Star.

Princess Weekes from The Mary Sue stated that she "really enjoyed" the series, but wrote that "it lacks Chinese actors, so if it's going to be brought back, that's a really easy fix." Writing for Syfy, Alyssa Fikse described the show as a "problematic fave", calling the lack of Asian characters in the show "negligent at best, racist at worst".

=== Fandom ===
Example fan artwork produced by Susan Renee Tomb (widely known in the Browncoat community as "11th Hour") used as guerrilla marketing to promote sale of Firefly and Serenity DVDs.

Firefly generated a loyal base of fans during its three-month original broadcast run on Fox in late 2002. These fans, self-styled Browncoats, used online forums to organize and try to save the series from being canceled by Fox only three months after its debut. Their efforts included raising money for an ad in Variety magazine and a postcard writing campaign to UPN. While unsuccessful in finding a network that would continue the show, their support led to a release of the series on DVD in December 2003. A subsequent fan campaign raised over $14,000 in donations to have a purchased Firefly DVD set placed aboard 250 U.S. Navy ships by April 2004 for recreational viewing by their crews.

These and other continuing fan activities eventually persuaded Universal Studios to produce a feature film, Serenity. (The title of Serenity was chosen, according to Whedon, because Fox still owned the rights to the name 'Firefly'). Numerous early screenings of rough film cuts were held for existing fans starting in May 2005 as an attempt to create a buzz to increase ticket sales when the final film cut was released widely on September 30, 2005. The film was not as commercially successful as fans had hoped, opening at number two and making only $40 million worldwide during its initial theatrical release.

On June 23, 2006, fans organized the first worldwide charity screenings of Serenity in 47 cities, dubbed as Can't Stop the Serenity or CSTS, an homage to the movie's tagline, "Can't stop the signal". The event raised over $65,000 for Whedon's favorite charity, Equality Now. In 2007, $106,000 was raised; in 2008, $107,219; and in 2009, $137,331.

In July 2006 a fan-made documentary, Done the Impossible, was released. The documentary tells the story of the fans and how the show has affected them, and features interviews with Whedon and various cast members. Part of the DVD proceeds are donated to Equality Now.

NASA Browncoat astronaut Steven Swanson took the Firefly and Serenity DVDs with him on Space Shuttle Atlantis's STS-117 mission in June 2007. The DVDs were added to the media collection on the International Space Station as entertainment for the station's crews. (Note: At the time the DVDs were transported to the International Space Station, the cost of putting a pound of payload in Earth orbit was $10,000.)

A fan-made, not-for-profit, unofficial sequel to Serenity, titled Browncoats: Redemption, premiered at Dragon*Con 2010 on September 4, 2010. According to the film's creator and producer, Whedon gave "his blessing" to the project. The film was sold on DVD and Blu-ray at the film's website, with all proceeds being distributed among five charities. The film was also screened at various science-fiction conventions across the United States, with admission receipts similarly being donated. All sales ended on September 1, 2011, one year after its premiere, with total revenues exceeding $115,000.

=== Cult status ===
In 2005, New Scientist magazine's website held an internet poll to find "The World's Best Space Sci-Fi Ever". Firefly came in first place, with its cinematic follow-up Serenity in second. In 2012, Entertainment Weekly listed the show at No. 11 in the "25 Best Cult TV Shows from the Past 25 Years", commenting, "as it often does, martyrdom has only enhanced its legend."

Brad Wright, co-creator of Stargate SG-1, has said that the 200th episode of SG-1 is "a little kiss to Serenity and Firefly, which was possibly one of the best canceled series in history". In the episode, "Martin Lloyd has come to the S.G.C. [Stargate Command] because even though 'Wormhole X-Treme!' was canceled after three episodes, it did so well on DVD they're making a feature [film]".

The follow-up film, Serenity, was voted the best science fiction movie of all time in an SFX magazine poll of 3,000 fans. Firefly was later ranked #25 on TV Guide's Top Cult Shows Ever. The name for the Google beta app Google Wave was inspired by this TV series.

In an interview on February 17, 2011, with Entertainment Weekly, Nathan Fillion joked that: "If I got $300 million from the California Lottery, the first thing I would do is buy the rights to Firefly, make it on my own, and distribute it on the Internet". This quickly gave rise to a fan-run initiative to raising the funds to purchase the rights. On March 7, 2011, the organizers announced the closure of the project due to lack of endorsement from the creators, with $1 million pledged at the time it was shut down.

Joss Whedon, Tim Minear, and cast members Nathan Fillion, Alan Tudyk, Summer Glau, Adam Baldwin, and Sean Maher reunited at the 2012 San Diego Comic-Con for a 10th-anniversary panel. Ten thousand people lined up to get into the panel, and the panel ended with the crowd giving the cast and crew a standing ovation.

A tenth anniversary special, Browncoats Unite, was shown on the Science Channel on November 11, 2012. The special featured Whedon, Minear, and several of the cast members, in a discussion on the series' history.

According to Reason's Julian Sanchez, Firefly's cult following "seems to include a disproportionate number of libertarians". The story themes are often cautionary about too-powerful central authority and its capacity to do bad while being considered by the majority as good. The characters each exhibit traits that exemplify core libertarian values, such as the right to bear arms (Jayne, Zoe), legal prostitution (Inara), freedom of religion (Book), logic and reasoning (Simon), and anti-conscription (River). Joss Whedon notes this theme, saying "Mal is, if not a Republican, certainly a libertarian, he's certainly a less-government kinda guy. He's the opposite of me in many ways."

=== Podcasts ===
The Signal is a Firefly and Serenity-focused podcast developed by fans of the Joss Whedon property. Hosted by Kari Haley and Les Howard, The Signal is a fan-driven podcast dedicated to Joss Whedon's short-lived TV series Firefly (2002) and its film Serenity (2005). Initially created as guerrilla marketing to promote Serenity, the podcast features discussions about the franchise's role-playing game, fan fiction as audio dramas, and interviews (e.g. with PJ Haarsma, Jane Espenson, and Marc Gunn). Haley and Howard described the podcast's purpose as "[doing] whatever we can to see that more new Firefly is created in any format."

In early 2006, Mur Lafferty described the show as "PG-rated", about an hour long, and publishing an episode every two weeks. That December, The Signal released a compilation album of filk music that had previously featured on the podcast: Songs from the Black; the album featured music by Luke Ski, Lich King, and Greg Edmonson.

In 2006, The Signal received a People's Choice Podcast Award in the categories of "TV & Film" and "Best Produced"; it received the former again in 2008. The Signal was awarded the 2007 Parsec Award for "Best Fan Podcast", and in the category of "Best Speculative Fiction Fan or News Podcast (Specific)", it won the 2010 and 2012 Parsecs. Writing for Maximum Fun, Ian Brill praised The Signal as surprisingly professional with well-produced segments, though he unflatteringly compared Haley and Howard to Whedon's character Xander Harris: "They say mildly clever and cutesy things to each other and then sound tremendously satisfied with themselves while saying it."

=== Awards ===
Firefly won the following awards:

- Emmy Award: Outstanding Special Visual Effects for a Series, 2003 (episode "Serenity")
- Visual Effects Society: Best visual effects in a television series, 2003 (episode "Serenity")
- Saturn Award: Cinescape Genre Face of the Future Award, Male, 2003 (Nathan Fillion)
- Saturn Award: Saturn Award for Best DVD Release (television), 2004
- SyFy Genre Awards: Best Series/Television, 2006
- SyFy Genre Awards: Best Actor/Television Nathan Fillion, 2006
- SyFy Genre Awards: Best Supporting Actor/Television Adam Baldwin, 2006
- SyFy Genre Awards: Best Special Guest/Television Christina Hendricks for "Trash", 2006
- SyFy Genre Awards: Best Episode/Television "Trash", 2006

The series was also nominated for the following awards:

- Visual Effects Society: Best compositing in a televised program, music video, or commercial, 2003
- Motion Picture Sound Editors, USA, "Golden Reel Award": Best sound editing in television long form: sound effects/foley, 2003
- Hugo Award: Best Dramatic Presentation, Short Form, 2003 (episode "Serenity")
- Hugo Award: Best Dramatic Presentation, Short Form, 2004 (episodes "Heart of Gold" and "The Message", which at that time had not been shown on television in the USA)
- Golden Satellite Award: Best DVD Extras, 2004

=== Ratings ===
At the time the series was canceled by Fox, it averaged 4.7 million viewers and ranked 98th in Nielsen ratings.

=== In popular culture ===
The cancellation of Firefly is a running gag in the CBS sitcom, The Big Bang Theory, which ran from 2007 to 2019. The character Sheldon Cooper is a fan of the show. When he and Leonard Hofstadter discuss their roommate agreement, they include a passage in which they dedicate Friday nights to watching Firefly, as Sheldon believes it will last for years (season 3, episode 22). Upon its cancellation, he brands Rupert Murdoch, the owner of Fox, a traitor. During the show's second season, in episode 17 ("The Terminator Decoupling"), Summer Glau appears as herself, encountering Sheldon, Leonard, and their friends on a train to San Francisco. When Raj tries to hit on her, he says that although he is an astrophysicist, she was actually in space during the shooting of Firefly. Glau chides him for believing this, and Raj backtracks, saying, "Those are crazy people!" In season 8, episode 15, Raj and Leonard recognize Nathan Fillion in a café and insist on taking a selfie with him, though he denies being the Firefly star.

On the NBC comedy Community, the characters Troy and Abed are fans of the show. They have an agreement that if one of them dies, the other will stage it to look like a suicide caused by the cancellation of Firefly, in the hopes that it will bring the show back.

In the 2003 Battlestar Galactica miniseries/pilot, a ship resembling Serenity appears in the background of the scene with Laura Roslin (Mary McDonnell). Serenity is one of several spaceships inserted as cameos into digital effects scenes by Zoic Studios, the company responsible for digital effects in both Firefly and Battlestar Galactica.

The television series Castle, where Fillion plays the lead character Richard Castle, has made ongoing homages to Firefly. Castle has props from Firefly as decorative items in his home, has dressed up as a "space cowboy" for Halloween ("You wore that five years ago", cracked his daughter), speaks Chinese that he learned from "a TV show [he] loved", and has made rapid "two-by-two" finger motions while wearing blue surgical gloves. He has been humorously asked if he has ever heard of a spa known as "Serenity", and Firefly catchphrases such as "shiny", "special hell", and "I was aiming for the head" have been used as punchlines during various dramatic scenes in Castle. He has worked a murder case at a science fiction convention with suspects being the cast of a long-cancelled space opera that only ran for a season, and has had direct and incidental interaction with people portrayed by Firefly cast members.

Con Man, a 2015 comedy web series created by Tudyk and co-produced by Fillion, draws on the pair's experiences as cult science fiction actors touring the convention circuit. Though it is not autobiographical, the show's fictional Spectrum echoes Firefly and Tudyk's and Fillion's roles reflect their own Firefly roles. Staite, Torres, Glau, Maher, and Whedon made guest appearances. Maher played himself as a former Firefly actor.

== Media franchise ==
The popularity of the short-lived series served as the launching point for a media franchise within the Firefly universe, including the feature film Serenity, which addresses many plot points left unresolved by the series' cancellation.

Additionally, there are two comic-book mini-series, Serenity: Those Left Behind (3 issues, 104 pages, 2006), Serenity: Better Days (3 issues, 80 pages, 2008) and a one-shot hardcover Serenity: The Shepherd's Tale (56 pages, 2010), along with the one-shots Serenity: Downtime and The Other Half and Serenity: Float Out in which Whedon explored plot strands he had intended to explore further in the series. The comics are set, in plot terms, between the end of the TV series and the opening of the feature film. The two mini-series were later published in collected form as hardcover and paperback graphic novels. A six-issue series titled Serenity: Leaves on the Wind began in January 2014 and the series takes place after the events of the film. A six-issue series titled Serenity: No Power in the 'Verse began in October 2016 and the series is set about 1.5 years after Leaves on the Wind. In July 2018, Boom! Studios announced that they had acquired the comic book and graphic novel publishing license to Firefly with plans to release new monthly comic book series, limited series, original graphic novels, and more.

In July 2014, the release of the video game Firefly Online was announced that planned to have the cast reprise their roles. Although never officially cancelled, there have been no updates about the game's release since March 2016.

In January 2018, Titan Books announced that they would begin publishing original canon Firefly novels. Nine books have so far been released.

In January 2020, Fox's entertainment president Michael Thorn said that a revival series had been considered, but decided that since The Orville was on the air it would not make sense for the network to have two space franchises at the same time.

=== Animated series ===
On March 15, 2026, Nathan Fillion confirmed that an animated series was in development with animation by ShadowMachine, with himself, Tudyk, Torres, Staite, Baccarin, Maher, Glau, and Baldwin all expected to reprise their roles for the series. Marc Guggenheim and Tara Butters are attached as showrunners and have a completed script. While series creator Joss Whedon is not actively involved with the animated series, Fillion also confirmed that Whedon had given his blessing to the project.
