= Reaver (Firefly) =

Fictional group of humans in the science fiction series Firefly

Glimpse of a Reaver during their raid on Lilac in Serenity

Reavers are a fictional group of humans in the television series Firefly and subsequent film Serenity who live on the fringes of civilized space and have become animalistic. Within most of the timeline of the series and movie, the existence of Reavers is officially denied by the Alliance, the ruling government of humanity in the Firefly franchise, but they are a harsh reality around the outer planets.

The Reavers are mentioned several times during the course of the television show. A Reaver ship is seen in the pilot episode, and the episode "Bushwacked" shows someone who was exposed to the Reavers’ madness and starts to mimic them. The movie Serenity featured Reavers and revealed their origin.

== Concept ==
Joss Whedon, creator of the Firefly series and director of Serenity, has said of Reavers, "Every story needs a monster. In the stories of the old west it was the Apaches". He explained how he removed the racial aspect of the Apache metaphor by using the Reavers. "I used that example by saying that anyone who goes out into space and goes mad can become a monster." The purpose Reavers serve in the show has been compared to the Hollywood "Injuns" of the 1950s in western movies by outside sources.

Comic book artist Bernie Wrightson, co-creator of Swamp Thing, contributed Reaver concept designs for the film Serenity. The "mythology" of the Reavers in Firefly and Serenity has been said to be different.

== Behavior ==
In Firefly, Reavers are readily recognized in any situation by both appearance and behavior. Whether ritually or in fits of rage, they are portrayed as self-mutilating creatures, peeling off parts of their own skins and shoving pieces of metal into the flesh. Reavers are savage, brutal, and primal, though they engage in some form of social behavior and cooperation within their own group. In the franchise, their contact with normal humans appears to be limited to combat, rape to death, torture, and cannibalism. These contacts are brief and survivors few. As a result, little is known of Reavers' social structure.

Reavers growl and snarl like beasts; even radio transmissions within their flotilla seem to be little more than shrieks and moans. However, they presumably communicate on some level as they are still able to cooperate and act purposefully enough to use spaceships and set sophisticated technological traps. In Serenity, the Reavers only begin to closely inspect the disguised Serenity after it fails to respond to a red light pulse from a Reaver ship. This suggests that Reavers have retained some level of higher intelligence and social structure, though they are guided solely by their impulse to capture and consume any humans they come in contact with.

The Reavers live on the edge of the human-controlled binary solar systems, rarely venturing deep into occupied space. As a result, most of the inner worlds and many Alliance officials believe them to be myths made to cover for violent criminals. Reavers are known to capture ships and raid colonies on the edge of populated space – as Zoe puts it:

"If they take the ship, they'll rape us to death, eat our flesh, and sew our skins into their clothing – and if we're very, very lucky, they'll do it in that order."

They occasionally leave intentional survivors of their raids, apparently subjecting them to a form of brainwashing – forcing them to witness the torture of other Reaver victims – that may drive them into the same state of cannibalistic depravity.

They travel in macabre ships stained with blood and decorated with corpses chained to the hulls. They appear to live their whole lives in space, only touching down on a planet or moon to carry out a raid.

== Technology and battle tactics ==
Reaver ships, captured from their victims, are instantly recognizable by the haphazard red stripes and bodies of victims adorning their hulls. They are also known for flying without proper safety measures such as nuclear engine radiation containment, a practice tantamount to suicide. This makes Reaver ships faster than their normal counterparts, but also makes it easier for their prey to detect their approach and to hide by powering down their ships rather than fleeing. Reavers' habit of ramming their victims with indifference to damaging their own hulls tends to leave their ships appearing battered or torn.

Their craft possess a wide variety of exotic weaponry, many of which are designed to snare and capture other ships including EMP cannons, grappling lines, and energy nets. They use weapons that fire giant sharpened disks similar to buzzsaws or shuriken, in addition to more traditional anti-ship ordnance. They also fire long, lance-like metal rods. Rather than firearms, Reavers will use any sharp object as a weapon in personal combat. They also fire toxic darts to cripple their opponents but not kill them. The goal of their weaponry is most likely to increase the number of survivors on victim ships (since Reavers have no interest in victims who are already dead). To cripple rescue ships, they have been known to leave a bait ship intact with a bomb planted on board, set to detonate when another ship docks to help, destroying the already-derelict ship and crippling the ship that tried to provide aid.

The Reavers operate a variety of vessels, from Firefly-sized vessels to captured Alliance warships. In the movie Serenity, the most notable of the Reaver ships was a huge colony vessel orbiting Miranda, which is several times larger than any of the Alliance vessels it subsequently attacked. Even with its greater size, the Reavers used the same tactics as with smaller ships, ramming an Alliance flagship and splitting it in half due to the vast difference in mass.

== Human response ==
Reavers terrify most non-Reaver humans. Even the most battle-hardened will opt to leave any space where Reavers are present rather than risk capture. For instance, in the show, when Reavers are coming, Mal becomes very serious and escapes quickly. Reavers are also possibly the only thing that even Jayne fears, as the mere suggestion of traveling where there is a risk of encountering Reavers makes him extremely agitated; although he claims to fear no man, Jayne declares that "Reavers ain't men!". In the movie Serenity, the normally calm and collected Operative is visibly terrified as Reaver ships appear through an ion cloud and hastily orders his ships to fire on them.

Reaver methods are so horrifying that, when faced with capture, victims have been known to attempt suicide. Survivors have been known to cut their own faces, act and think like Reavers, and eventually become Reavers themselves. Mercy killings of people who are captured or who fall into the hands of Reavers are considered humane, as evidenced in one scene in the movie Serenity when Mal shoots and kills a man who is grabbed by a few Reavers, who respond by dropping the dead man to the ground.

Because of their part in the unethical, if accidental, creation of the Reavers, the Alliance government denies their existence, even withholding information on them from Alliance commanders of patrol ships in or near Reaver-space.

== Origin ==
The original theory within the series is that Reavers are men who traveled to the edge of the star system and were driven mad by the open vastness of space. This theory is discussed among most of the crew members of Serenity. In "Bushwhacked", Shepherd Book states that he believes that they are "just men" who have been removed from civilization far too long—men who could be helped. Both Jayne and Mal strongly disagree with the Shepherd's opinion.

The Reavers' true origin is revealed later in the movie Serenity. The crew of Serenity find evidence, in the form of an Alliance scientist's holographic message, that Reavers were originally humans from the planet Miranda. The Alliance government used Miranda as a testing ground for the chemical agent G-23 Paxilon Hydrochlorate, or simply "Pax" (Latin for "peace"). It was added to the planet's air processors in order to calm the population and weed out aggression. The agent worked, but too well: 99.9% of the population became so lethargic that they stopped working, talking and, eventually, eating and moving. They simply lay down where they were and allowed themselves to die. The remaining 0.1% of the planet's 30 million people (approximately 30,000 total) had the opposite reaction to the Pax, becoming mindlessly violent and extremely aggressive. In fact, the scientist is violently killed by one of these survivors, the original Reavers, while recording the message.

Following the events of Miranda, the Alliance sealed all records regarding the event and deemed the world unsuitable for colonization. When Reavers began attacking outer colonies, only a few officials within the Alliance knew the real cause. This changes, however, when the crew of Serenity arrange for what they have uncovered to be broadcast throughout the colonized system, what they refer to as "the 'verse".
