= Control Factor =

- Written by: John Dombrow
- Directed by: Nelson McCormick
- Starring: Adam Baldwin; Elizabeth Berkley
- Theme music composer: Pete Kneser
- Country of origin: United States
- Original language: English

Production
- Producer: Chuck Simon
- Running time: 84 minutes
- Production company: S Pictures

Original release
- Network: Sci-Fi Channel
- Release: January 18, 2003

Control Factor is a 2003 American made-for-television science fiction film produced by S Pictures in association with Sci-Fi Channel. It was directed by Nelson McCormick and features Adam Baldwin, Elizabeth Berkley, Tony Todd, Conrad Dunn and John Neville.

== Plot ==
After a mysterious, disheveled man nearly kills him, insurance salesman Lance Bishop hears a voice in his head urging him to murder his wife. When he discovers he has become part of a government mind-control project, he and others similarly being experimented on fight back.

== Cast ==
- Adam Baldwin as Lance Bishop
- Elizabeth Berkley as Karen Bishop
- Tony Todd as Reggie
- Conrad Dunn as Thrillkill
- John Neville as Director
- Peter Spence as Trevor Constantine
- David Ferry as Detective Jordan
- Mif as Homeless Trance Man
- Raoul Bhaneja as Clerk
