= Bushwhacked (Firefly) =

- Firefly episode
- Episode no.: Season 1 Episode 3
- Directed by: Tim Minear
- Written by: Tim Minear
- Production code: 1AGE02
- Original air date: September 27, 2002

Guest appearances
- Doug Savant as Commander Harken; Branden R. Morgan as the survivor

Episode chronology
← Previous "The Train Job"	Next → "Shindig"

"Bushwhacked" is the third episode of the science fiction television series Firefly created by Joss Whedon.

The crew of Serenity comes across a transport ship drifting in space. After recovering a terrified survivor and a valuable cargo, they are pulled in by an Alliance cruiser. While the Alliance commander grills each member of the crew, it appears that Reaver-spawned violence has not yet run its course.

== Synopsis ==
Serenity encounters a drifting spacecraft which turns out to be an obsolete short-range transport scow converted into a one-way settler vessel for passage to the "Outer Planets". Captain Mal decides to investigate the ship, eager to loot it for any valuable supplies or cargo. He sends his crew off in teams to explore the ship, while he and Zoe head to a section that he suspects holds the most valuable supplies.

River leaves the ship and finds Mal and Zoe before pointing out mutilated bodies hanging from the ceiling. Mal knows what did this and orders everyone to regroup in the engine room, but Jayne is ambushed by a mysterious attacker and fires his gun wildly. Mal finds the wounded man hiding behind an air grate and has him brought back to the ship.

As Simon treats the wounded man, Mal reveals to the rest of the crew that he must be the lone survivor of a Reaver attack. He explains how the Reavers, once settlers themselves, were driven insane after seeing the nothing at the "edge of the galaxy" and now commit unspeakable acts of evil against anyone they encounter. He allows Shepherd Book and Simon to give the dead a proper funeral, while Kaylee removes a Reaver booby trap that attached itself to Serenity when they docked earlier.

Once the derelict ship's cargo is aboard, Serenity starts to leave, only to be stopped by an Alliance cruiser. Armed troops board the ship and find Mal and everyone but River and Simon waiting for them, the salvaged cargo plainly in sight to avoid accusations of theft. Alliance Commander Harken accuses them of harboring two fugitives and detains them for questioning.

Commander Harken interviews each member of the crew while his crew tend to the survivor and ransack Serenity. The space-suited Tams are undetected; Mal had shown them where to cling to on the outside of the hull knowing that the Alliance wouldn't think to check there.

Harken, aware of Mal's past as a Browncoat, accuses him of attacking the settler ship, revealing that the survivor's tongue has been split and implying that Mal did it to keep him from speaking. Mal realizes that the survivor is becoming a Reaver, having been traumatized by what he witnessed. Harken dismisses Mal's idea as nonsense designed to avoid blame and orders that Serenity be impounded so that it can be sold at auction.

As Harken prepares to confine Mal, his lieutenant informs him that the survivor has killed the medical personnel attending to him and escaped. Mal convinces Harken that he knows where the madman will go. Harken allows Mal to lead him and his soldiers back onto Serenity. The survivor attacks the soldiers, but Mal is able to break the Reaver's neck, saving Harken's life. As a result, Harken allows the crew of Serenity to go, though he still confiscates their cargo. After Serenity undocks, the cruiser is seen firing on the derelict ship, destroying it.

== Guest cast ==
- Doug Savant as Alliance Commander Harken
- Branden Morgan as the Reaver
