= Adam Baldwin =

American actor (born 1962)

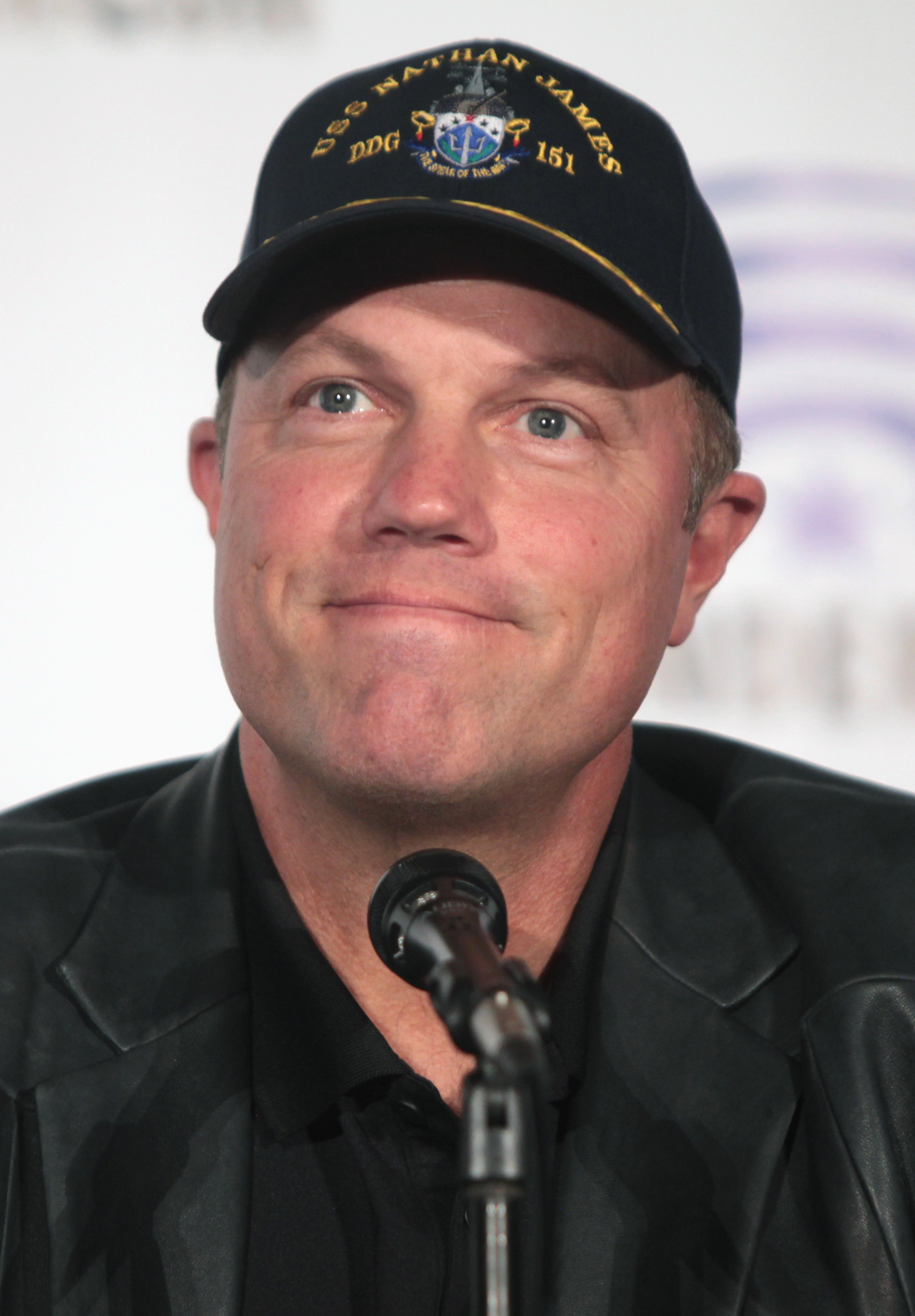
- Baldwin at the 2016 WonderCon
- Born: February 27, 1962 (age 64); Winnetka, Illinois, U.S.
- Occupation: Actor
- Years active: 1980–present
- Spouse: Ami Julius (m. 1988)
- Children: 3

Adam Baldwin (born February 27, 1962) is an American actor. He made his film debut in My Bodyguard (1980) and later appeared in films including Full Metal Jacket (1987), Predator 2 (1990), Independence Day (1996), The Patriot (2000), and Serenity (2005). On television, he is known for playing Jayne Cobb in Firefly, John Casey in Chuck, and Mike Slattery in The Last Ship. He has also worked as a voice actor, including as Superman in Superman: Doomsday (2007) and Dutch in Halo 3: ODST (2009).

== Early life ==
Baldwin was born on February 27, 1962, in Winnetka, Illinois, and studied at New Trier Township High School in east Winnetka. Raised in the Chicago area, Baldwin played hockey as a youth.

== Career ==
Baldwin began acting professionally as a teenager, landing the role of Ricky Linderman in the Chicago-set film My Bodyguard (1980). That same year he appeared in Robert Redford's Academy Award-winning drama Ordinary People as Kevin Stillman. In the early 1980s he continued with supporting roles in films including D.C. Cab (1983) and Reckless (1984).

By the late 1980s he had moved into higher-profile studio productions, including Stanley Kubrick's Vietnam War film Full Metal Jacket (1987), in which he played the Marine nicknamed "Animal Mother," and the crime thriller Next of Kin (1989). In the 1990s he appeared in a run of mainstream features including Predator 2 (1990), the western biopic Wyatt Earp (1994) portraying Tom McLaury, and the science-fiction blockbuster Independence Day (1996). He later played Captain Wilkins in Roland Emmerich's Revolutionary War film The Patriot (2000).

On television, Baldwin became a regular cast member of Joss Whedon's science-fiction series Firefly (2002–2003) as the mercenary Jayne Cobb, and reprised the role in the continuation film Serenity (2005). From 2007 to 2012 he played the National Security Agency agent John Casey on NBC's action-comedy series Chuck. His other television work includes a regular role on ABC's Day Break (2006–2007) and a lead role on the 1996–1997 drama series The Cape as Col. Jack Riles. He made a brief on-screen return to the schoolyard premise of My Bodyguard with a cameo in the comedy Drillbit Taylor (2008), noted as an explicit nod to his earlier film.

In 2012 and 2015 he guest-starred on Castle as Detective Ethan Slaughter, reuniting on screen with Firefly co-star Nathan Fillion. He later joined the TNT action drama The Last Ship (2014–2018) as Mike Slattery, the destroyer's second-in-command. In film, he later appeared in the western The Kid (2019) as Bob Olinger, and the sports drama American Underdog (2021) as Terry Allen.

Baldwin has also worked as a voice actor, including voicing Superman in the animated film Superman: Doomsday (2007), and portraying Dutch in the video game Halo 3: ODST (2009). He provided additional voices for citizens and other miscellaneous characters in Half-Life 2: Episode Two (2007). Along with his Chuck co-star Yvonne Strahovski, he contributed voice work to Mass Effect 2 (2010), voicing the quarian marine Kal'Reegar.

== Personal life ==
Baldwin is married to Ami Julius and has three children. In 2009, he participated in Ride 2 Recovery's "Don't Mess with Texas Challenge", a fundraising ride supporting rehabilitation programs for wounded service members and veterans.

=== GamerGate ===
In 2014, Baldwin became associated with GamerGate after using the hashtag "#GamerGate" during the controversy. Sources differed on how to characterize his role in the hashtag's origin: Time wrote that Baldwin "coined" the term, The Washington Post reported that its origin was disputed and that Baldwin claimed credit for it, and The New Yorker described it as having been popularized by him. The New Yorker also reported that Baldwin linked to a video making an allegation about game developer Zoë Quinn that the magazine said had since been "proved false". In a 2014 interview with Vulture, Baldwin described GamerGate as focused on ethics in games journalism and argued that threats of violence should not be treated as inherent to the hashtag, calling it "a mistake to commingle the two". WIRED later described Baldwin as lending "high profile support" to the controversy, while the Columbia Journalism Review wrote that, in the absence of clear spokespeople for GamerGate, journalists sometimes interviewed "proxies like actor Adam Baldwin".

== Filmography ==
=== Film ===
Year	Title	Role	Notes
1980	My Bodyguard	Ricky Linderman	
1980	Ordinary People	Kevin Stillman	
1983	D.C. Cab	Albert Hockenberry	
1984	Reckless	Randy Daniels	
1986	3:15	Jeff Hannah	
1986	Bad Guys	Skip Jackson	
1987	Full Metal Jacket	Sergeant "Animal Mother"	
1987	Hadley's Rebellion	Bobo McKenzie	
1988	Cohen and Tate	Tate	
1988	The Chocolate War	John Carter	
1989	Next of Kin	Joey Rosselini	
1990	Predator 2	Agent Adam Garber	
1991	Guilty by Suspicion	FBI Agent #1	
1992	Where the Day Takes You	Officer Black	
1992	Radio Flyer	Jack "The King" McKenzie	
1993	Eight Hundred Leagues Down the Amazon	Koja	
1993	Treacherous	Tommy Wright	
1993	Bitter Harvest	Bobby	
1994	Cold Sweat	Mitch	
1994	Wyatt Earp	Tom McLaury	
1995	Digital Man	Captain West	
1995	How to Make an American Quilt	Mr. Dodd	
1996	Independence Day	Major Mitchell	
1996	Lover's Knot	John Reed	
1997	Starquest II	Lee	
1998	Gargantua	Marine Biologist	
2000	The Patriot	Captain James Wilkins	
2000	The Right Temptation	Captain Wagner	
2001	Pursuit of Happiness	Chad Harmon	
2001	Above & Beyond	Peter Clerkin	
2001	Jackpot	Mel James	
2001	Farewell, My Love	Jimmy	
2001	Double Bang	Vinnie Krailes	
2001	The Keyman	Chris Myers / Keyman	
2002	Hypersonic	Christopher Bannon	
2003	Control Factor	Lance Bishop	
2003	Betrayal	Detective Mark Winston	
2003	Gacy	John Gacy Sr.	
2004	The Freediver	Dr. Viades	
2004	Evil Eyes	Jeff Stenn	
2005	Molly & Roni's Dance Party	Principal	
2005	Serenity	Jayne Cobb	
2006	The Thirst	Lenny	
2007	Superman: Doomsday	Superman (voice)	Direct-to-video
2008	Gospel Hill	Carl Herrod	
2008	Drillbit Taylor	Disgruntled Bodyguard	
2009	Little Fish, Strange Pond	Tommy	
2010	Browncoats: Redemption	Phone Operator	Uncredited
2011	InSight	Dr. Graham Barrett	
2012	War of the Worlds: Goliath	Wilson (voice)	
2015	Vault of the Macabre II	Narrator (voice)	Short film
2017	Vault of the Macabre: The House Upon the Hill	Narrator (voice)	Short film
2019	The Kid	Bob Olinger	
2019	The Legend of 5 Mile Cave	Sam Barnes	
2021	American Underdog	Terry Allen	

=== Television ===
Year	Title	Role	Notes	Ref.
1984	Pigs vs. Freaks	Mickey South	Television film	
1985	Special Treat	Otto Frommer	Episode: "Out of Time"	
1985	Poison Ivy	Ike Dimick	Television film	
1986	Welcome Home, Bobby	Cleary Biggs	Television film	
1992	Cruel Doubt	Det. John Taylor	Television film	
1992	Deadbolt	Alec Danz	Television film	
1993	The Last Shot	Mark Tullis Jr.	TV short	
1994	Blind Justice	Sgt. Hastings	Television film	
1995	Fallen Angels	Ralph	Episode: "Good Housekeeping"	
1995	VR.5	Scott Cooper	Episode: "Pilot"	
1995	Trade-Off	Thomas Hughes	Television film	
1995	Sawbones	Burt Miller	Television film	
1995	Shadow-Ops	Dalt	Television film	
1996	Smoke Jumpers	Don Mackey	Television film	
1996–1997	The Cape	Col. Jack Riles	Main role; 18 episodes	
1997	The Visitor	Michael O'Ryan	4 episodes	
1997–1999	Firehawks	Morgan Dalton (voice)	26 episodes	
1998	From the Earth to the Moon	Fred Haise	Episode: "For Miles and Miles"	
1998	Gargantua	Jack Ellway	Television film	
1998	Indiscreet	Jeremy Butler	Television film	
1998	The Outer Limits	Major James Bowen	Episode: "Phobos Rising"	
2000	Recess	B.O.E. Agent (voice)	Episode: "All the Principal's Men"	
2000	Dr. Jekyll and Mr. Hyde	Dr. Henry Jekyll / Mr. Edward Hyde	Television film	
2000–2001	Static Shock	York (voice)	2 episodes	
2000–2001	Men in Black: The Series	Agent X (voice)	7 episodes	
2000–2005	Jackie Chan Adventures	Finn (voice)	Main role; 48 episodes	
2001	The Zeta Project	Sven (voice)	Episode: "Crime Waves"	
2001–2002	The X-Files	Knowle Rohrer	5 episodes	
2002–2003	Firefly	Jayne Cobb	Main role; 14 episodes	
2003	Control Factor	Lance Bishop	Television film	
2003	CSI: Miami	De Soto	Episode: "Dead Woman Walking"	
2003	Monster Makers	Jay Forrest	Television film	
2004	JAG	Cmdr. Michael Rainer	Episode: "Good Intentions"	
2004	Stargate SG-1	Col. Dave Dixon	Episodes: "Heroes"	
2004	NCIS	Cmdr. Michael Rainer	Episode: "The Weak Link"	
2004	Angel	Marcus Hamilton	5 episodes	
2005	Justice League Unlimited	Jonah Hex, Rick Flag, Bonk (voice)	3 episodes	
2005	The Inside	Special Agent Danny Love	Main role; 13 episodes	
2005	The Poseidon Adventure	Sea Marshal Mike Rogo	Television film	
2006	Bones	Special Agent Jamie Kenton	Episode: "Two Bodies in the Lab"	
2006	Invader Zim	Announcer, Customer, Control Brain (voice)	Episode: "The Frycook What Came from All That Space"	
2006–2008	Day Break	Chad Shelton	Main role; 13 episodes	
2007	Sands of Oblivion	Jesse Carter	Television film	
2007–2012	Chuck	John Casey	Main role; 91 episodes	
2008	CSI: NY	DHS Agent Brett Dunbar	Episode: "Hostage"	
2008	Chuck Versus the Webisodes	John Casey	5 episodes	
2011	Love Bites	Hotel Dick	Episode: "Modern Plagues"	
2011–2012	Transformers: Prime	Breakdown (voice)	10 episodes	
2012	Young Justice	Parasite (voice)	Episode: "Performance"	
2012	Leverage	Colonel Michael Vance	2 episodes	
2012	Law & Order: Special Victims Unit	Captain Steven Harris	3 episodes	
2012–2015	Castle	Detective Ethan Slaughter	2 episodes	
2013	Beware the Batman	Rex Mason / Metamorpho (voice)	3 episodes	
2014–2018	The Last Ship	Commander / Captain Mike Slattery	Main role; 56 episodes	
2019–present	GunnyTime	Himself / Host		
2023–2024	9-1-1: Lone Star	Detective Brian McGregor	2 episodes	
2024	S.W.A.T.	Calvin Webb	Episode: "Family Man"	
TBA	Firefly: The Animated Series	Jayne Cobb (voice)	Main role	

=== Video games ===
Year	Title	Role	Notes
2003	Kill.switch	Archer	
2007	Halo 3	Marines	
2007	Half-Life 2: Episode Two	Citizens	
2009	Halo 3: ODST	Dutch	
2010	Mass Effect 2	Kal'Reegar	
2011	DC Universe Online	Superman	
2013	Injustice: Gods Among Us	Hal Jordan	
2015	Code Name: S.T.E.A.M.	Henry Fleming	
2015	Infinite Crisis	Hal Jordan / Green Lantern	
2015	Firefly Online	Jayne Cobb	
