= Firefly Online =

Massively multiplayer online video game

- Developers: Quantum Mechanix; Spark Plug Games
- Publisher: Quantum Mechanix
- Composer: David Joseph Wesley
- Engine: Unity
- Platforms: Microsoft Windows macOS iOS; Android
- Genre: Role-playing game
- Mode: Single-player

Firefly Online is a vaporware strategic role-playing video game based on the Firefly franchise. It was being developed by Spark Plug Games and Quantum Mechanix for Microsoft Windows, macOS, iOS, and Android. Although never officially cancelled, there have been no updates about the game's release since March 2016.

== Gameplay ==
Firefly Online's core gameplay would revolve around the player assuming the role of a starship captain, then taking command of a ship, engaging in missions, and trading with other ships for resources and supplies. The game would have a central narrative with various side-stories, and players might have been able to create jobs for each other to complete. Players would have been able to customize their ships while playing, and view "in-universe guides" around planets to gain information before deciding whether to land on them.

Furthermore, both space and planetary environments would exist. The game would have contained more than 200 different worlds to visit.

An important aspect of the game would be assembling a crew to maintain the player's ship, with potential crewmates possessing unique skills such as engineering, medical aptitude, or expertise in weapons handling, and the player needing to find, recruit, and keep them in line or risk losing their command.

== Development ==
Prior to the announcement of an official title, a fan made game titled Firefly Universe Online was being developed by DarkCryo. Fox gave their blessing to the game, but the studio ceased development following the announcement of an official release based on the Firefly franchise. Firefly Online was announced at the 2013 San Diego Comic-Con for iOS and Android. It was later announced for Microsoft Windows and macOS. QMx Interactive joined Spark Plug Games to produce the game. Joss Whedon, creator of the series, was not involved with the development of the game but was aware of it. The development team was planning to add future downloadable content which might have included the ability to switch to the Alliance faction, involved the inclusion of "Reavers", and was aiming to incorporate cross-platform functionality. The PC versions would have been distributed via Steam.

Gameplay of Firefly Online was shown at the 2014 San Diego Comic-Con. At that Comic Con it was announced that the original TV series cast was going to voice their in-game characters, along with a number of cast from the series, with Star Trek: The Next Generation's Wil Wheaton providing the male voice for the player's avatar.

Originally planned for launch in Spring 2015, the developers were required to recreate large amounts of it after the original show's cast were brought on to provide voice acting. John O'Neill, CEO of Spark Plug Games, said that they were having to "change everything" and that they were deliberately not providing development updates to avoid "saying something that’s wrong again." The last post on Firefly Online's Facebook page dated March 2016 said, "We're still here. We're still flyin'. Game is still in development. Stay tuned."
