= List of Buffyverse literature =

Buffyverse literature includes Buffy novels, Angel novels, Buffy/Angel novels, Tales of the Slayer, and both official and unofficial guidebooks.

Additionally, two magazine titles have been published by Titan Magazines in the United Kingdom for fans of the television series Buffy the Vampire Slayer and its spin-off Angel. Buffy the Vampire Slayer Magazine commenced publication in 1999. Angel Magazine had a limited run of 24 issues and was published between September 2003 and July 2005. Buffy the Vampire Slayer Magazine incorporated Angel Magazine from #76 (August 2005), and was renamed Buffy the Vampire Slayer Magazine incorporating Angel Magazine. It went bi-monthly in 2006, and the final issue was #94 (June/July 2007).

== Novels ==
=== History ===
Buffyverse stories	Location, time (if known)
Tales of the Slayer	(Various)
Tales of the Slayer	First collection Tales of Slayers that lived prior to Buffy.
Tales of the Slayer	(Various)
Tales of the Slayer	Second collection Tales of Slayers that lived prior to Buffy.
Tales of the Slayer	(Various)
Tales of the Slayer	Third collection Tales of Slayers that lived prior to Buffy.
Tales of the Slayer	(Various)
Tales of the Slayer	Fourth collection Tales of Slayers that lived prior to Buffy.
Buffy book: Spike and Dru: Pretty Maids All in a Row	1940s
Buffy book: Spike and Dru: Pretty Maids All in a Row	It's 1940 and for Drusilla's vampiric birthday, Spike decides he will acquire Freyja's Strand for her.
Buffy book: Blackout	New York, 1977
Buffy book: Blackout	Nikki Wood fights against the forces of darkness and also tries to protect her son. Spike arrives in the city.

=== Buffy Season 1 ===
These Buffyverse tales take place around Buffy Season 1 (from spring 1996 up until spring 1997).

Buffyverse stories	Location, time (if known)
Buffy book: Halloween Rain	Sunnydale, Halloween 1996
Buffy book: Halloween Rain	On Halloween Xander & Willow warn Buffy if it's raining.
Buffy book: Night of the Living Rerun	Sunnydale, 1996/7
Buffy book: Night of the Living Rerun	The Master attempts to rise once more.
Buffy book: Coyote Moon	Sunnydale, summer 1997
Buffy book: Coyote Moon	It's summer vacation in Sunnydale and the carnival has come to town.
Buffy anthology book: How I Survived My Summer Vacation	Sunnydale, & L.A., summer 1997
Buffy anthology book: How I Survived My Summer Vacation	Buffy visits her Dad in L.A. whilst the others continue the good fight.

=== Buffy Season 2 ===
These tales take place during Buffy Season 2, (from autumn 1997 up until spring 1998).

Buffyverse stories	Location, time (if known)
Buffy book: Keep Me In Mind	Sunnydale, 1997
Buffy book: Keep Me In Mind	Ethan Rayne returns and releases an evil sorcerer from Middle Ages Bavaria.
Buffy book: The Suicide King	Sunnydale, 1997
Buffy book: The Suicide King	A number of strange student suicides have been taking place, and Buffy suspects something wrong.
Buffy book: Colony	Sunnydale, 1997
Buffy book: Colony	Mayor Richard Wilkins III invited a woman named Belakane to speak at the local Sunnydale High School. She has a program, "Be the Ultimate You!".
Buffy book: Night Terrors	Sunnydale, 1997
Buffy book: Night Terrors	The Night Terror stalks its victims in their dreams. The demon replaces another's soul with its own, then wreaks chaos in the real world.
Buffy book: Bad Bargain	Sunnydale, 1997
Buffy book: Bad Bargain	Items for the school rummage sale become infected with Hellmouth parasites after being stored in the school basement.
Buffy book: After Image	Sunnydale, 1997
Buffy book: After Image	Sunnydale drive-in reopens.
Buffy book: Carnival of Souls	Sunnydale, 1997
Buffy book: Carnival of Souls	A Traveling Carnival arrives in Sunnydale. It seems the carnival might be another victim of Sunnydale's weirdness.
Buffy book: Portal Through Time	Sunnydale, 1997
Buffy book: Portal Through Time	Some of the Master's devotees travel through time to attempt to disrupt the Slayer lineage, thus preventing Buffy from destroying the Master.
Buffy book: Go Ask Malice: A Slayer's Diary	Boston, December 1997 - June 1998
Buffy book: Go Ask Malice: A Slayer's Diary	Faith has a tough time growing up in South Boston, moving from relative to relative when Diana Dormer arrives and informs Faith that she is a potential slayer.
Buffy book: Blooded	Sunnydale, 1997/8
Buffy book: Blooded	The Scoobies become entangled in a long-running feud between Asian warriors.

=== Buffy Season 3 ===
These tales take place during Buffy Season 3 (from autumn 1998 up until spring 1999).

Buffyverse stories	Location, time (if known)
Buffy book: Sins of the Father	Sunnydale, 1998
Buffy book: Sins of the Father	Pike visits Sunnydale.
Buffy book: Child of the Hunt	Sunnydale, 1998
Buffy book: Child of the Hunt	The 'Wild Hunt' arrives in Sunnydale.
Buffy book: Ghoul Trouble	Sunnydale, 1998
Buffy book: Ghoul Trouble	A new vampire arrives in town called Solitaire who is immune to the sun's rays.
Buffy book: Paleo	Sunnydale, 1998
Buffy book: Paleo	People try to resurrect dinosaur eggs.
Buffy book: The Evil That Men Do	Sunnydale, 1998
Buffy book: The Evil That Men Do	Helen, an ancient vampire attempts to raise a goddess of destruction.
Buffy book: The Deathless	Sunnydale, 1999
Buffy book: The Deathless	Ring Day is fast approaching at Sunnydale High.
Buffy book: Doomsday Deck	Sunnydale, 1999
Buffy book: Doomsday Deck	Tarot card-reader, Justine arrives in Sunnydale.
Buffy book: Immortal	Sunnydale, 1999
Buffy book: Immortal	Buffy faces Veronique, a vampire even more immortal than most.
Buffy book: Prime Evil	Sunnydale, spring, 1999
Buffy book: Prime Evil	Crystal Gregory is a beautiful new teacher at Sunnydale High, who also happens to give Buffy panic fits.
Buffy book: Revenant	Sunnydale, spring, 1999
Buffy book: Revenant	A Chinese gang arrives in Sunnydale.
Buffy book: Power of Persuasion	Sunnydale, spring, 1999
Buffy book: Power of Persuasion	The Moon family try to create a "Womyn Power" group at school, meanwhile there is a string of unusual killings.
Buffy book: Resurrecting Ravana	Sunnydale, spring, 1999
Buffy book: Resurrecting Ravana	The Rakshasa are in town to help with the resurrection on an ancient Hindu god called Ravana.
Buffy books: The Gatekeeper [Trilogy]	Sunnydale, spring, 1999
Buffy books: The Gatekeeper [Trilogy]	'The Gatekeeper' is frail and on the verge of death, yet must hold the walls of reality together in the face of increasing threat.
Buffy book: Return to Chaos	Sunnydale, spring, 1999
Buffy book: Return to Chaos	Four Druids arrive in town. They're in town to try a spell on a certain night to close the gateway in the Hellmouth so that demons would not be allowed to pass through.
Buffy book: Visitors	Sunnydale, spring, 1999
Buffy book: Visitors	Buffy thinks she's being stalked by a demon with a high-pitched giggle.
Buffy book: Unnatural Selection	Sunnydale, spring, 1999
Buffy book: Unnatural Selection	Willow battles against the 'faeries'.
Buffy book: Obsidian Fate	Sunnydale, spring, 1999
Buffy book: Obsidian Fate	An old Spanish expedition is found on the outskirts of Sunnydale.
Buffy book: Deep Water	Sunnydale, spring, 1999
Buffy book: Deep Water	After an oil spill on a nearby Sunnydale beach, Willow discovers a 'selkie'; that is, a girl that can turn into a seal with her sealskin.
Buffy book: Here Be Monsters	Sunnydale, spring, 1999
Buffy book: Here Be Monsters	After Buffy kills twin teenage vampires, their vampire mother summons a Goddess of balance who puts Buffy on a trial that could cost people's lives.
Buffy book: The Book of Fours	Sunnydale, spring, 1999
Buffy book: The Book of Fours	The power of four slayers is needed to conquer a new threat.
Sunnydale High Yearbook	Sunnydale, spring, 1999
Sunnydale High Yearbook	Yearbook received by Scoobies when they graduated from High School.

=== Buffy Season 4/Angel Season 1 ===
These Buffyverse tales take place during Buffy Season 4, and Angel Season 1 (from autumn 1999 up until spring 2000).

Buffyverse stories	Location, time (if known)
Angel book: Not Forgotten	L.A. 1999
Angel book: Not Forgotten	Angel Investigations tries to help some struggling immigrants.
Buffy books: Lost Slayer [series]	Sunnydale, 1999
Buffy books: Lost Slayer [series]	Buffy, new to UC Sunnydale faces a group of vampires with bats tattooed across their faces who will have huge and not-so-appealing consequences for the Scooby Gang's future.
Buffy book: Oz: Into the Wild	Sunnydale, 1999
Buffy book: Oz: Into the Wild	Oz is in search of himself having left his home.
Angel book: Close to the Ground	L.A. 1999
Angel book: Close to the Ground	A big Hollywood studio head recruits Angel.
Angel book: Soul Trade	L.A. 1999
Angel book: Soul Trade	A girl's soul is mysteriously taken. Angel investigates.
Angel book: Redemption	L.A. 1999
Angel book: Redemption	A wealthy actress requests help.
Angel book: Shakedown	L.A. 1999
Angel book: Shakedown	Doyle has a vision of a seismic shift.
Angel book: Hollywood Noir	L.A. 1999
Angel book: Hollywood Noir	A decayed corpse at a Hollywood construction site is a sign.
Angel book: Avatar	L.A. 1999
Angel book: Avatar	Cordelia suggests beginning a Web site for their detective agency.
Angel book: Bruja	L.A. 1999
Angel book: Bruja	L.A. is shocked when a woman attacks a priest.
Angel book: The Summoned	L.A. 1999
Angel book: The Summoned	An anxious young woman, Terri Miller arrives in L.A.
Buffy book: These Our Actors	Sunnydale, 2000
Buffy book: These Our Actors	Willow takes up drama class, and Spike recalls Cecily.
Buffy/Angel books: Unseen [Trilogy]	Sunnydale, L.A., 2000
Buffy/Angel books: Unseen [Trilogy]	Buffy and Angel have to work together to solve disappearances of teenagers and calm down the gang warfare going on in LA.

=== Buffy Season 5/Angel Season 2 ===
These Buffyverse tales take place during Buffy Season 5, and Angel Season 2 (from autumn 2000 up until spring 2001).

Buffyverse stories	Location, time (if known)
Angel book: Image	L.A., 1950S/2000
Angel book: Image	An old evil is trying to use a painting.
Angel book: Stranger to the Sun	L.A., 2000
Angel book: Stranger to the Sun	Wesley opens a strange package.
Buffy book: Wisdom of War	Sunnydale, 2001
Buffy book: Wisdom of War	Two strange breeds of sea creatures are beginning to appear in Sunnydale.
Angel book: Vengeance	L.A., 2001
Angel book: Vengeance	Lily Pierce's motivational speaking spreads across the city.
Angel book: Haunted	L.A., 2001
Angel book: Haunted	Cordelia enters a haunted house for reality TV.
Buffy book: Tempted Champions	Sunnydale, 2001
Buffy book: Tempted Champions	A deadly fighter arrives, willing to kill both humans and vampires.
Buffy book: Little Things	Sunnydale, 2001
Buffy book: Little Things	The town is terrorised by something mysterious and tiny.
Buffy book: Crossings	Sunnydale, 2001
Buffy book: Crossings	Xander learns of a terrifying total immersion video game beta testing.
Buffy book: Sweet Sixteen	Sunnydale, 2001
Buffy book: Sweet Sixteen	Dawn befriends a girl named Arianna.

=== Buffy Season 6/Angel Season 3 ===
These Buffyverse tales take place around Buffy Season 6, and Angel Season 3 (from autumn 2001 up until spring 2002).

Buffyverse stories	Location, time (if known)
Buffy/Angel novel: Cursed	L.A., 2001
Buffy/Angel novel: Cursed	An organised, united effort is being made to put Spike out of the picture. Angel and Spike reluctantly work together and deal with their shared evil pasts.
Angel book: Sanctuary	L.A., 2001
Angel book: Sanctuary	A loud explosion occurs at Caritas.
Angel anthology book:The Longest Night	L.A., 2001
Angel anthology book:The Longest Night	It's December 21, and hour by hour Angel and his crew must survive the longest night of the year.
Buffy/Angel novel: Monster Island	Sunnydale, L.A., Monster Island, 2001
Buffy/Angel novel: Monster Island	The Fang Gang and the Scooby Gang must unite to protect a safe-haven of half-blood demons.
Angel book: Endangered Species	L.A., 2001
Angel book: Endangered Species	Angel considers the ethics of wiping out all vampires.
Angel book: Impressions	L.A., 2001
Angel book: Impressions	A desperate man arrives at the Hotel with a demon chasing him.
Buffy books: Wicked Willow	Sunnydale, 2002
Buffy books: Wicked Willow	Supposing that Dark Willow did not return to the good so quickly.

=== Buffy Season 7–8/Angel Season 4–5 ===
These Buffyverse tales take place around Buffy Season 7, and Angel Season 4 (from autumn 2002 up until spring 2003).

Buffyverse stories	Location, time (if known)
Buffy/Angel book: Seven Crows	Mexico, 2002
Buffy/Angel book: Seven Crows	Between Mexico and Arizona Riley Sam Finn call in Buffy and Angel to investigate mysterious supernature.
Buffy book: Apocalypse Memories	Sunnydale, 2002
Buffy book: Apocalypse Memories	Willow is terrified that using her magic powers might result in dark magic consuming her whilst the Angel Michael brings signs of apocalypse to Sunnydale.
Angel book: Dark Mirror	L.A., 2002
Angel book: Dark Mirror	The gang must face dark versions of themselves.
Buffy book: Mortal Fear	Sunnydale, 2002
Buffy book: Mortal Fear	Buffy is being sent on random missions by a man that goes by the name of Simon. He wants her to retrieve parts of a mystical sword and put them together, but he refuses to say why or who he even is.
Buffy book: Spark and Burn	Sunnydale, 2002
Buffy book: Spark and Burn	Spike remembers his past as he suffers insanity in a school basement.
Buffy/Angel book: Heat	Sunnydale, L.A., 2002
Buffy/Angel book: Heat	Buffy and Angel both battle the same ancient evil, a Possessor who was once "Qin".
Angel book: Solitary Man	L.A., 2002
Angel book: Solitary Man	Team Angel copes with a detective-wannabe-old women.
Angel book: Love and Death	L.A., 2002
Angel book: Love and Death	Demon-killers are provoked by an outspoken radio host
Angel book: Monolith	L.A., 2002
Angel book: Monolith	A huge monolith suddenly appears at Hollywood Boulevard.
Angel book: Nemesis	L.A., 2003
Angel book: Nemesis	One of Fred's old friends from graduate school contacts her for help at a big scientific facility.
Angel book: Book of the Dead	L.A., 2003
Angel book: Book of the Dead	Wesley's former-Watcher colleague, arrives at LA for a rare book auction.
Buffy book: Queen of the Slayers	Sunnydale, Cleveland, Italy, Summer 2003-2004
Buffy book: Queen of the Slayers	Hundreds of potential slayers have been awakened. A number of leading dark figures unite in an attempt to retaliate against the new status quo.
Buffy book: Dark Congress	2003–2004
Buffy book: Dark Congress	Until 500 years ago all of the demonic and monstrous races met at a Dark Congress. They prepare to meet again.

- One Thing Or Your Mother (by Kirsten Beyer) - August 2007

=== Authors ===
- (w/) = Collaboration with another Buffyverse author
- (s) = Short story

List of authors (alphabetically by surname) who have written novels set in the fictional Buffyverse:

- Pierce Askegren – After Image
- Laura J. Burns – Colony (w/), Apocalypse Memories (w/)
- Denise Ciencin – Nemesis (w/), Mortal Fear (w/)
- Scott Ciencin – Sweet Sixteen, Vengeance (w/), Nemesis (w/), Mortal Fear (w/)
- Arthur Byron Cover – Night of the Living Rerun
- Don DeBrandt – Shakedown
- Keith R.A. DeCandido – Blackout
- Cameron Dokey – Here Be Monsters, The Summoned, How I Survived My Summer Vacation (s)
- Doranna Durgin – Impressions, Fearless, The Longest Night (s)
- Diana G. Gallagher – Obsidian Fate, Prime Evil, Doomsday Deck, Spark and Burn, Bad Bargain
- Craig Shaw Gardner – Return to Chaos, Dark Mirror
- Ray Garton – Resurrecting Ravana
- Laura Anne Gilman – Visitors (w/), Deep Water (w/)
- Christopher Golden – Halloween Rain (w/), Blooded (w/), Child of the Hunt (w/), The Gatekeeper trilogy (w/), Immortal (w/), Sins of the Father, Pretty Maids All in a Row, The Lost Slayer series, Oz: Into the Wild, Wisdom of War, Monster Island (w/)
- Christie Golden – Tales of the Slayer (s), The Longest Night (s)
- Alice Henderson – Night Terrors, Portal Through Time
- Nancy Holder – Halloween Rain (w/), Blooded (w/), Child of the Hunt (w/), The Gatekeeper trilogy (w/), Immortal (w/), The Evil That Men Do, The Book of Fours, Blood and Fog, Keep Me In Mind, Queen of the Slayers, Carnival of Souls, Not Forgotten, Endangered Species, The Longest Night (s)
- Dan Jolley – Vengeance (w/)
- Dori Koogler – These Our Actors (w/)
- Robert Joseph Levy – The Suicide King, Go Ask Malice, ToS: Back to the Garden (s)
- Ashley McConnell – These Our Actors (w/), Book of the Dead
- Jeff Mariotte – Unseen Trilogy (w/), Hollywood Noir, Haunted, Stranger to the Sun, Endangered Species, Sanctuary, Solitary Man, Love and Death, Close to the Ground
- Elizabeth Massie – Power of Persuasion
- Melinda Metz – Colony (w/), Apocalypse Memories (w/)
- Rebecca Moesta – Little Things
- Yvonne Navarro – Wicked Willow trilogy, Paleo, Tempted Champions, Tales of the Slayer (s), How I Survived My Summer Vacation (s), The Longest Night (s)
- Mel Odom – Unnatural Selection, Revenant, Crossings, Cursed, Redemption, Bruja, Image, ToS: Ch'ing Shih (s), ToS: Silent Screams (s)
- John Passarella – Ghoul Trouble, Avatar, Monolith
- Paul Ruditis – ToS: The Show Must Go On (s)
- Josepha Sherman – Visitors (w/), Deep Water (w/)
- Thomas E. Sniegoski – Soul Trade (w/), Monster Island (w/)
- John Vornholt – Coyote Moon, Seven Crows

=== Canonical issues ===
The books featured in this list are not part of Buffyverse canon. They are not considered as official Buffyverse reality, but are novels from the authors' imaginations. However unlike fan fiction, 'overviews' summarising their story, written early in the writing process, were 'approved' by both Fox and Joss Whedon (or his office), and were therefore later published as officially Buffy or Angel merchandise (see main article for details).

== Official guidebooks ==
=== "Watcher's Guides" ===
The Official guides to Buffy the Vampire Slayer offer a comprehensive guide to the show. The episode guides include synopses, lines from the shooting scripts that were deleted, biographies, interviews, music listings, monster listings, special notes, pictures, quotes, and much behind-the-scenes information.

Watcher's Guides Vol. 1
- Author: Christopher Golden, Nancy Holder
- Publisher: Simon & Schuster
- Publication date: October 1, 1998
- Pages: 304

Vol. 1 Key Contents	Description
"Mythology of Buffy"	Mythology surrounding slayers and vampires.
"Sunnydale Guidebook"	Tour of the town.
"Character Guide"	Profiles of key characters
"Episode Guide"	Buffy Seasons 1 & 2.
"Monster Guide"	Profiles on key vampires demon..
"Bloodlust"	Sunnydale Love connections.
"Behind the Scenes"	Interviews with many key cast & crew members.
"Music"	Info on main songs that appeared in Seasons 1–2.

Watcher's Guides Vol. 2
- Author: Nancy Holder, Jeff Mariotte, Maryelizabeth Hart
- Publisher: Simon & Schuster
- Publication date: October 31, 2000
- Pages: 304

Vol. 2 Key Contents	Description
"Buffyverse: Character Guide"	Profiles of key characters.
"Buffyverse: The Pain"	Extended commentary on love and loss in Sunnydale.
"Episode Guide"	Buffy Seasons 3 & 4.
"Cast Profiles"	Profiles of key actors
"Creating Buffy"	Set report on "The I in Team" and interviews with cast & crew.
"Bands of Buffy"	Interviews with bands who appeared on the show.
"Meranandising"	Guide to spinoff products.

Watcher's Guides Vol. 3
- Author: Paul Ruditis
- Publisher: Simon & Schuster
- Publication date: July 6, 2004
- Pages: 368

Watcher's Guide Volume III opted to include only an episode guide (Seasons 5–7), and a number of essays:

Author	Vol. 3 Essays
Ginger Buchanan	"The Journey of Jonathan Levinson"
Hank Wagner	"The Family Hour"
Rob Francis	"Buffy from a British perspective"
Maryelizabeth Hart	Slaying the Big Lies: Love conquers all, and other monstrous myths"
Allie Costa	"A Part of Something, or Buffy the Vampire Slayer: My First Long-Term Relationship"
Scott and Denise Cienin	"I Know You Are, but Who Am I?: Dawn"
Charles De Lint	"Why I Like Buffy"
James Moore	"Monsters Made to Order"
Joss Whedon ("Restless" teleplay), Paul Ruditis (commentary)	"Restless: A Path to Premonitions"
Micol Ostow	"Chosen: A Postmodern Postmortem of Buffy as a Contemporary Icon"

=== "Casefiles" ===
Casefiles Vol. 1
- Author: Nancy Holder, Jeff Mariotte, Maryelizabeth Hart
- Publisher: Simon & Schuster
- Publication date: June 1, 2002
- Pages: 416

Casefiles Vol. 2
- Author: Paul Ruditis, Diana G. Gallagher
- Publisher: Simon & Schuster, (Simon Spotlight Entertainment)
- Publication date: November 30, 2004
- Pages: 304

The official companions to Angel. The content of these books follows similar standards set by the "Watcher's Guides", including comprehensive episodes guides, images, quotes and behind the scenes information.

Volume I covers Angel Seasons 1 & 2.

Volume II covers Angel Seasons 3 & 4.

== Unofficial guidebooks ==
These books were not licensed by 20th Century Fox as official Buffy/Angel merchandise.

=== Keith Topping ===
Keith Topping has written several unofficial guide books to television series such as The X Files, The Avengers, The Sweeney and The Professionals. He has also written guides to both Buffy (Slayer), and Angel (Hollywood Vampire).

The style of the guides analytically studies each episode in categories, drawing attention to things which may otherwise have not been noticed by viewers.

==== Slayer ====
Slayer
- Author: Keith Topping
- Publisher: Virgin Publishing
- Publication date: December 1, 2004
- Pages: 702

The first edition of Slayer was released in the UK in December 1999, and offered a guide to the first three seasons of Buffy. The book has undergone numerous editions, the most recent of which, Complete Slayer includes information on all seven seasons of Buffy.

The categories which Topping uses to analyse each episode include:

"Slayer" categories	Information
"Dreaming (As Blondie Once Said) is Free"	Commentary on dream sequences.
"Dudes and Babes"	Commentary on "who's hot and who's not"
"Authority Sucks"	Buffy's run ins with authority.
"Mom's Apple Pie"	Commentary on aspects of family life and in particular the relationship between Buffy and Joyce.
"Denial Thy Name is Joyce"	Details of Buffy's mother's abilities in self-delusion.
"It's a Designer Label"	Details of fashion tips, statements and victims.
"References"	Brings attention to subtle and unsubtle cultural references.
"Geek-Speak"	Notes cultural references from the Trio (Warren Mears, Andrew Wells & Jonathan Levinson)
"Bitch!"	Notes moments of female meanness.
"Awesome!"	Notes Topping's preferred sequences of action, or comedy.
"Valley-Speak"	Notes the speech patterns of Californian teens.
"Cigarettes and Alcohol"	Notes teenage naughtiness.
"Logic Let Me Introduce You to This Window"	Goofs and errors in continuity.
"I Just Love Your Accent"	Commentary on perceptions of Britain and Britishness.
"Quote/Unquote"	Topping's preferred dialogue.

==== Hollywood Vampire ====
Hollywood Vampire
- Author: Keith Topping
- Publisher: Virgin Publishing
- Publication date: February 2004
- Pages: 432

Hollywood Vampire has gone through several editions, the most comprehensive of which (February 2004), includes Angel seasons 1–4. The 228-page guide to Angel Season 5, Hollywood Vampire: The Apocalypse, also by Topping, was released in May 2005.

The layout of the guide follows that of Slayer using categories for each episode, some of which are different than its predecessor:

"Hollywood Vampire" categories	Information
"Dreaming (As Buffy often proved) is Free"	Commentary on dream sequences.
"Dudes and Babes"	Commentary on "who's hot and who's not"
"It's a Designer Label"	Details of fashion tips, statements and victims.
"References"	Brings attention to subtle and unsubtle cultural references.
"West Hollywood"	Notes humorous references to Angel's sexuality.
"The Charisma Show"	Notes important Cordelia scenes.
"L.A.-Speak"	Notes the speech patterns of wealthy Californians.
"There's a Ghost in my House"	Appearances from Phantom Dennis.
"Sex, Drugs, and Rock'n Roll"	Mentions of characters walking on the wilder side of life.
"Logic Let Me Introduce You to This Window"	Goofs and errors in continuity.
"I Just Love Your Accent"	Commentary on perceptions of Britain and Britishness.
"Quote/Unquote"	Topping's preferred dialogue.

=== Nikki Stafford ===
Nikki Stafford has written guides on both Buffy (Bite Me) and Angel (Once Bitten).

==== Bite Me ====
Bite Me
- Author: Nikki Stafford
- Publisher: ECW Press
- Publication date: September 2002
- Pages: 450

The most recent edition (September 2002) includes Seasons 1-6. It also gives capsule reviews to Angel (Seasons 1-3). Additionally it includes behind scenes information, and a biography of Sarah Michelle Gellar.

==== Once Bitten ====
Once Bitten
- Author: Nikki Stafford
- Publisher: Ecw Press
- Publication date: October 28, 2004
- Pages: 300

A guide to Angel seasons 1-5. Features a history of the show, a section profiling the best websites, a look at Buffy and Angel's recognition in academic circles, behind-the-scenes information.

=== Dusted ===
Dusted
- Author: Lawrence Miles, Pearson Lars, Dickson Christa
- Publisher: Mad Norwegian Press
- Publication date: November 2003
- Pages: 336

Lawrence Miles, who usually focuses on fiction, here offers his opinions on seven seasons of Buffy. The guide contains a comprehensive episode guide and a brief guide to the Buffy comics and novels that had been published prior to 2003.

=== The Girl's Got Bite ===
The Girl's Got Bite
- Author: Kathleen Tracy
- Publisher: Griffin
- Publication date: May 2003
- Pages: 384

The second edition (May 2003) of this book covers up to mid-way through the seventh season of Buffy (and therefore is not a guide to the entirety of the series) and features episode guides, cast biographies, Buffy trivia and behind-the-scenes anecdotes.

== Magazines ==
Buffyverse magazine
- Editor: Daryl Curtis &/or Martin Eden (Buffy #1-#52); Natalie Clubb (Buffy #53-present); Martin Eden (Angel #1-#24)
- Categories: Science fiction-related
- Frequency: Run completed in summer 2007 (118 issues + specials).
- First issue: October 1999
- Final issue: June/July 2007
- Company: Titan Magazines
- Country: United Kingdom
- Language: English
- Website: Official magazine website

The contents of the magazine issues listed below are intended as a general reference and are not exhaustive. Many regular features such as the 'News' section, quizzes, Q&As, and posters are not detailed here. Furthermore, the reviews listed below in the reviews section disclude Buffy/Angel episode/DVD reviews.

KEY: In the reviews section, '(None)' signifies no reviews were present, whilst '-' signifies that reviews were present but only of episodes/DVDs.

=== Buffy the Vampire Slayer ===
Issue	Date	Interviews	Features	Reviews
#1	Oct 99	David Boreanaz	'Ask Joss', 'Slayer Palooza' (Music in the Bronze), 'How to identify a Vampire', Comic: "Wu-tang Fang"	(None)
#2	Nov 99	James Marsters, Juliet Landau, Robia La Morte	'Ask Joss', 'Dust to Dust' (Digital special effects) Comic: "The Final Cut"	(None)
#3	Dec 99	Anthony Stewart Head	'High School Hell' (tales from cast and crew about their school experiences), 'Thoroughly Modern Magic' (use of witchcraft in show), Comic: "Hey, Good Looking, part 1"	(None)
#4	Jan 2000	Charisma Carpenter	Villain guide part 1, Comic: Comic: "Hey, Good Looking, part 2"	(None)
#5	Feb 2000	(None)	Report on Angel series, Villain guide part 2, Comic: "A Boy Named 'Sue'"	(None)
#6	Mar 2000	Seth Green, Bianca Lawson	Episode Guide (Buffy Season 1), 'Dead and Loving It' (Vampires in pop culture) Comic: "A Nice Girl Like You"	(None)
#7	Apr 2000	James Marsters, Juliet Landau, Mark Metcalf	'Sunnydale Tour': cemetery, 'Evil Twin' (Vamp Willow feature), Comic: "Love Sick Blues I"	(None)
#8	May 2000	Kristine Sutherland	Episode Guide (Buffy Season 2), 'Sunnydale Tour': Sunnydale High, 'Taking the Fall (Stunt team feature), Comic: "Love Sick Blues II"	(None)
#9	Jun 2000	Nicholas Brendon, Eliza Dushku	Buffy tour (Buffy's bedroom), Comic: "Lost Highway"	(None)
#10	Jul 2000	Harry Groener	Episode Guide (Buffy Season 3), 'Safe at Home' (Buffy's house - set feature), Comic: She's No Lady I	(None)
#11	Aug 2000	Joss Whedon, Emma Caulfield	Library set-report, feature on costume design Comic: "She's No Lady I"	(None)
#12	Sep 2000	Joss Whedon, Armin Shimerman	Make-up feature, Comic: "Old Friend"	(None)
#13	Oct 2000	Glenn Quinn, Danny Strong	'Bite Club' (poll on fave vamps), Comic: "Double Cross"	(None)
#14	Nov 2000	Marc Blucas, Mercedes McNab, Dagny Kerr	'Sunndale Tour': Buffy's dorm room, Episode Spotlight: "Fear Itself", Make-up feature, Comic: "Paint the Town Red I"	(None)
#15	Dec 2000	Alyson Hannigan, Parker Abrams (pretend interview)	'Sunndale Tour': Initiative, Episode Spotlight: "Hush", How to Survive College, Comic: "Paint the Town Red II"	(None)
#16	Jan 2001	Amber Benson	Episode Guide (Angel Season 1), 'Sunndale Tour': UC Sunnydale, 'Ghost Hunters' (report on real-life paranormal investigators), Set report: Cordy's apartment, Episode Spotlight: "A New Man", Comic: "The Blood of Carthage I"	"Ring of Fire", "Pretty Maids All in a Row", "Ghoul Trouble"
#17	Feb 2001	Bai Ling	'Demonic Poession', Episode Guide (Buffy Season 4), Set reports: Xander's room & Angel's Season 1 offices, Episode Spotlight: "Welcome to the Hellmouth", Comic: "The Blood of Carthage II"	Top 5 novels (Xander Years novelizations, "Blooded", "Power of Persuasion", "How I Survived My Summer Vacation", and "The Gatekeeper")
#18	Mar 2001	Lindsay Crouse, Randall Slavin and Carey Cannon (The Oracles)	Set-report: Angel's apartment, Buffy's Love Quiz, Top 10 sexiest men in Buffyverse poll, Buffy Art Team Comic: "The Blood of Carthage III"	Watcher's Guide II, "Doomsday Deck", "Jonathan"
#19	Apr 2001	George Hertzberg, Elisabeth Röhm	Angel injuries (feature on the beatings of Angel), Wolfram and Hart feature, Top 10 sexiest women in Buffyverse poll, Comic: "The Blood of Carthage IV"	"Surrogates", Buffy/Angel video sets
#20	May 2001	Joss Whedon, Bailey Chase & Leonard Roberts (Initiative members Forrest & Graham)	Analysis of "Restless", 'Sunndale Tour': Spike's crypt, Episode Spotlight: "This Year's Girl/Who Are You?", Comic: "The Blood of Carthage V"	"Revenant", "Hollywood Noir"
#21	Spring 2001	Alexis Denisof, Mercedes McNab	Watcher Test, Demonology part 1, Episode Spotlight: "Helpless", Comic: "The Blood of Carthage VI"	"Not Forgotten", "Close to the Ground", "Redemption", "Shakedown", "Hollywood Noir", "Avatar"
#22	Jun 2001	Joss Whedon (about Fray), Julie Benz	Demonology part 2, Episode Spotlight: "Angel" (Buffy Season 1 episode), Comic: "The Blood of Carthage VII"	"Fray #1", "The Blood of Carthage", "The Book of Fours"
#23	Jul 2001	J. August Richards, Jane Espenson, D'Hoffryn (pretend interview)	Feature about set designs, Buffy best episodes poll, Comic: "The Blood of Carthage VIII"	"Earthly Possessions"
#24	Aug 2001	Joss Whedon (Q&A), Emma Caulfield, Tim Minear, Phantom Dennis (pretend interview), Tom Sniegoski (about Soul Trade)	Episode Spotlight: "Prophecy Girl", Comic: "The Blood of Carthage IX"	Unseen I, Soul Trade
#25	Sep 2001	Doug Petrie, Michelle Trachtenberg, Amber Benson	'Saved by the Edit (feature on editing the show), Comic: "The Blood of Carthage X"	"Unseen II"
#26	Oct 2001	Mere Smith, David Boreanaz, Andy Hallett, Christian Kane	Episode Spotlight: "Becoming II", Film noir article, Comic: "Heart of the Slayer I"	-
#27	Nov 2001	Rudolph Martin (played 'Dracula'), Clare Kramer, Brendon Wayne Ka Tang, Juliet Landau	Set report: Dracula's place, Comic: "Heart of the Slayer II"	"Bruja", "Food Chain", "Lost Slayer I: Prophecies"
#28	Dec 2001	Nicholas Brendon, Anthony Stewart Head, David Fury	Getting onto the show feature, make-up feature, Comic: "Heart of the Slayer III"	"Lost Slayer II: Dark Times"
#29	Jan 2001	Shawn Ryan, James Marsters	Monster Mash, Demon on Wheels (feature on Angel's car), Episode Spotlight: "Passion", Comic: "Heart of the Slayer IV"	"Lost Slayer III: King of the Dead", "Unseen III"
#30	Feb 2001	Joss Whedon, Rebecca Rand Kirshner, Anthony Stewart Head, Yvonne Navarro	Episode Spotlight: "Lovers Walk", Comic: "Cemetery of Lost Love I"	"Lost Slayer IV: Original Sins", "Tales of the Slayer", "Autumnal"
#31	Mar 2002	Steven S. DeKnight, Amy Acker	'Getting Down to What's Important'(Open letter from Marti Noxon about story telling in the post-911 world), "Smashed" set report, Love lines (a look at romance in the Buffyverse), Comic: "Cemetery of Lost Love II"	"Tales of the Slayers"
#32	Apr 2002	Amber Benson, Julie Benz, Marti Noxon	Comic: "Out of the Woodwork I"	"The Summoned", "Past Lives"
#33	May 2002	Marti Noxon, Tim Minear	Feature about stunts, Episode Spotlight: "Something Blue", Comic: "Out of the Woodwork II"	"Haunted"
#34	June 2002	David Boreanaz, Mercedes McNab, Christopher Golden	Comic: "Out of the Woodwork III"	"Tempted Champions", "Music for Elevators" (album by Anthony Stewart Head)
#35	Summer 2002	J. August Richards, David Fury, Rebecca Rand Kirshner	Comic: "Out of the Woodwork IV"	(None)
#36	Jul 2002	David Greenwalt, Danny Strong, Adam Busch, Tom Lenk	'How to Cut It as a Vampire Slayer', Episode Spotlight: "Bewitched, Bothered and Bewildered", Comic: "Out of the Woodwork V"	"Strange Bedfellows", "Out of the Woodwork", "Sweet Sixteen"
#37	Aug 2002	Michelle Trachtenberg	Feature on Angel locations, Episode Spotlight: "The Body", Comic: "Out of the Woodwork VI"	"Oz", "Into the Wild", "Creatures of Habit", "Image"
#38	Sep 2002	James Marsters, Stephanie Romanov, Doug Petrie	'Telling Tales' (feature about how to write a Buffy episode), Episode Spotlight: "School Hard", Comic: "Out of the Woodwork VII"	"Crossings (Buffy novel)"
#39	Oct 2002	Amber Benson	'Pop Idols' (feature about music in Buffyverse), "Once More with Feeling, Episode Spotlight: "", Comic: "Out of the Woodwork VIII"	"Stranger to the Sun", "False Memories", "Long Night's Journey"
#40	Nov 2002	Anthony Stewart Head	Top ten scariest episodes, Giles' best moments, Panel on Buffy Season 6 (featuring views from Buffy writers and actors), Episode Spotlight: "Fool for Love", Comic: "Death of Buffy I"	"Wisdom of War", "Vengeance", "Ugly Little Monsters"
Yearbook	Winter 2002/3	Joss Whedon, David Boreanaz, Alyson Hannigan, Nicholas Brendon, Alexis Denisof, James Marsters, Michelle Trachtenberg, Robin Sachs	Sarah Michelle Gellar profile, 'Welcome to the Hellmouth' (Classic moments), Buffy episode guide (Seasons 1-6), Angel episode guide (Seasons 1-3)	None
#41	Dec 2002	J. August Richards, Amy Acker, Adam Busch	'Casualties of War (feature paying tribute to deceased characters), Episode Spotlight: "Doppelgangland", Comic: "Death of Buffy II"	"Little Things", "These Our Actors", "Haunted"
#42	Jan 2003	Joss Whedon, Mark Lutz	'Heroes and Villains, Behind the Scenes on Buffy the Vampire Slayer (Xbox), Episode Spotlight: "New Moon Rising", Comic: "Death of Buffy III"	-
#43	Feb 2003	Julie Benz, Tim Minear	'Coolest Kick-ass Moments' Episode Spotlight: "Surprise"/"Innocence", Comic: "Death of Buffy IV"	"The Longest Night"
#44	Mar 2003	Emma Caulfield, Elizabeth Anne Allen..	Set report: "Selfless", "Make-up Secrets" (feature about the creation of the monsters), Comic: "Death of Buffy V"..	"The Longest Night" and Cordelia Collection Vol. 1 (novilisations of some key Cordelia Buffy episodes)
#45	Apr 2003	Nicholas Brendon, Jane Espenson, Jason Carter (actor who portrayed Repo-man in "Double or Nothing")	Episode Spotlight: "The Replacement", Comic: "Death of Buffy VI"	"Tales of the Slayer: Vol. 2", "Death of Buffy", "Lost Slayer Omnibus"
#46	May 2003	Amber Benson, Alexis Denisof, Marti Noxon	Episode Spotlight: "Earshot", Comic: "Note from the Underground I"	"Impressions"
#47	Jun 2003	Drew Greenberg, Emma Caulfield	Slayer Mythology guide, Episode Spotlight: "Bad Girls", Comic: "Note from the Underground II"	"Sanctuary", "Monster Island"
#48	Jul 2003	James Marsters, Marti Noxon	Comic: "Note from the Underground III"	"Willow & Tara"
#49	Summer 2003	Amy Acker	Set report: "Lies My Parents Told Me", Episode Spotlight: "Buffy vs. Dracula", Comic: "Note from the Underground IV"	"Blood and Fog"
#50	Aug 2003	Joss Whedon	Buffy Wrap Party, Top 10 merchandise, Comic: "Note from the Underground V"	"Viva Las Buffy"
#51	Sep 2003	Tom Lenk	Make-up feature, Episode Spotlight: "Chosen", Comic: "Note from the Underground VI"	"Seven Crows", "Chaos Bleeds comic", "Chaos Bleeds"
#52	Oct 2003	Anthony Stewart Head, Camden Toy (appeared as numerous demons)	Costume design feature, Comic: "Note from the Underground VII"	"Chaos Bleeds novel", "Wrath of the Darkhul King"
#53	Nov 2003	Alyson Hannigan	Article about Willow, 'Final episode journal' (report from insider on "Chosen"), Episode Spotlight: "Two to Go"/"Grave", Comic: "Note from the Underground VIII"	"Chaos Bleeds"
#54	Dec 2003	Marti Noxon, Robin Sachs	Baddest villains, Comic: "Reunion I"	"Radio Sunnydale", "Mortal Fear"
Year	Winter 2003	Joss Whedon, Alyson Hannigan, Nicholas Brendon, James Marsters, Michelle Trachtenberg, Amber Benson	Buffy episode checklist (Seasons 1-7), A Slayer's Life (Buffy profile), How to Cut it as a Vampire Slayer, Fall Guys (stunts article), Growing Pains (article about the Scobbies emotional turmoil), Buffy Writers' Memories (mini interviews with Noxon, Petire, Espenson Kirshner, Fury), Once More With Feeling article, Willow the Witch, Buffy Set report: "Selfless", Writer's revelations Episode spotlights: Prophecy Girl, Fool for Love, Bewitched, Bothered and Bewildered, Doppelgängland, New Moon Rising, The Gift, A New Man	None
#55	Jan 2004	Eliza Dushku, D.B. Woodside	Behind scenes of CD (Radio Sunnydale), Article about Faith, Episode Spotlight: "Dirty Girls", Comic: "Reunion II"	"Cursed", "Fearless"
#56	Feb 2004	Iyari Limon, Nathan Fillion ('Caleb')	Episode Guide (Buffy Season 7), Episode Spotlight: "Superstar"	"Play With Fire"
#57	Mar 2004	Joss Whedon, Juliet Landau, Amber Benson, Bianca Lawson	Top 10 snogs, 'Love is in the Air', Article about Spike, Episode Spotlight: "The Prom"	Round-up of books and novels released in previous 12 months.
#58	Apr 2004	James Marsters, Clare Kramer, April Weeden-Washington ('Nikki Wood'), Johnathan Woodward ('Holden Webster')	Villain analysis	"Tales of the Slayer: Vol. 3", "Tales of the Vampires #1"
#59	May 2004	Jane Espenson, Nicholas Brendon, Kristine Sutherland, Rudolph Martin (played 'Dracula')	Article about Anya, Buffy Finales	"Tales of the Vampires #2"
#60	Spring 2004	Emma Caulfield, Kali Rocha, Robia La Morte	Article about Willow, 'Buffy Comedy'	"Tales of the Vampires #1"
#61	June 2004	Marti Noxon, James Leary, Michelle Trachtenberg, Mark Metcalf	Unaired Buffy pilot, article about Dawn	"Tales of the Vampires #4", "Wicked Willow I: Darkening"
#62	July 2004	Anthony Stewart Head, Doug Petrie, George Hertzberg, Max Perlich ('Whistler'), Yvonne Navarro	Classic Scene: "The Gift", Top 50 moments	"Wicked Willow II: Shattered Twilight"
#63	Aug 2004	Drew Greenberg, Eliza Dushku, Seth Green, Robert Duncan (composer), Julia Lee ('Anne Steele')	Classic Scene: "New Moon Rising", Convention report ("Fusion"),	"Tales of the Vampires #4", "A Stake to the Heart"
#64	Sep 2004	Nathan Fillion ('Caleb'), James Marsters, Adam Busch,	Article about Buffy Summers, 'Director's Cut' (feature about Buffy directors)	"Heat"
#65	Oct 2004	Nicholas Brendon, Rebecca Rand Kirshner, Tom Lenk, Elizabeth Anne Allen, Paige Moss ('Veruca')	'Unlikely Romances	"Wicked Willow III: Broken Sunrise"
#66	Nov 2004	James Marsters, Juliet Landau, Doug Jones (lead 'Gentleman' from "Hush"), Seth Green	Monster make-up, Classic monsters, Episode Spotlight: "Halloween"	(None)
#67	Dec 2004	Sarah Michelle Gellar, Sarah Hagan	Article about Faith, 'The Watchers', Episode Spotlight: "Consequences"	(None)
#68	Jan 2005	Emma Caulfield, Charlie Weber ('Ben'), Ken Lerner & Armin Shimerman & D.B. Woodside (Principles of Sunnydale High; Flutie, Snyder and Wood)	Christmas feature	(None)
#69	Feb 2005	Amber Benson, Andy Umberger (D'Hoffryn)	Convention report, Top 10 teasers, Nerf Herder article	-
#70	Mar 2005	Marc Blucas, Kelly Donovan (Nicholas Brendon's twin brother), Joel Gray ('Doc'), Jeff Kober ('Kralick'/'Rack')	Buffyverse Love Triangles, Buffy Animated article, Episode Spotlight: "Into the Woods", Michelle Branch article,	"Tales of the Vampires"
#71	Apr 2005	David Boreanaz, James Marsters, Jane Espenson, Robert Joseph Levy, Nancy Holder, Larry Bagby ('Larry Blaisdell')	Sarah McLachlan article, Buffy trivia revealed	(None)
#72	Spring 2005	Drew Goddard, Danny Strong, Adam Busch, Tom Lenk, Phina Oruche ('Olivia')	Top of the Pops (best songs), Ultimate Buffy quiz, Four Star Mary article	(None)
#73	May 2005	Alyson Hannigan, Dagney Kerr ('Kathy'), Marti Noxon	Top 10 charms, Guide to Sunnydale, Episode Spotlight: "Smashed", K's Choice article	"The Suicide King"
#74	Jun 2005	Anthony Stewart Head, Tom Lenk, Leonard Roberts ('Forrest')	Article on censorship of the show, 'Scooby-Who' (personality test), The Breeders article	(None)
#75	Jul 2005	Alexis Denisof, Kevin Weisman ('Dreg'), Musetta Vanda ('Natalie French')	Clothes feature, 'Living Doll' (action figure article), Bif Naked article, Episode Spotlight: "Go Fish"	(None)

=== Angel ===
Issue	Date	Interviews	Features	Reviews
#01	Sep 2003	David Boreanaz, Stephanie Romanov	Episode Guide (Angel Seasons 1-4), Cordelia feature	Roundup of Angel novels, DVD special features
#02	Oct 2003	Alexis Denisof, Mercedes McNab, Jeffrey Bell, Mark Lutz ('Groo')	L.A. locations guide	Angel comics, cards, RPG, action figures, top trumps.
#03	Nov 2003	Joss Whedon, Amy Acker, Keith Szarabajka ('Holtz'), Sean Astin (director of "Soulless")	Angel personality test	(None)
#04	Dec 2003	Vincent Kartheiser, Julie Benz	Convention report (entire writing team of Angel present)	(None)
#05	Christmas 2003	J. August Richards, Andy Hallett	Season 5 feature on new set designs, 'An Angel Christmas' (shopping for presents for the Fang Gang)	(None)
#06	Jan 2004	David Boreanaz, Elizabeth Craft, Sarah Fain	Spike feature, "Conviction" set report	-
#07	Feb 2004	James Marsters	"Unleashed" set report, Wolfram and Hart profile	-
#08	Mar 2004	Mercedes McNab, Jeffrey Bell	'Angel's Angels' (a look at Angel's relationship with the women around him), Behind the scenes of making Mr Pee-Pee & Monster-Lorne (in "Life of the Party")	(None)
#09	Apr 2004	David Fury, Sarah Thompson, Juliet Landau	Costumes feature, "soul Purpose" set report, make-up feature	(None)
#10	May 2004	Team Angel (starring cast), Tom Lenk, Jonathan Woodward ('Knox')	"Damage" set report, set design of Fred's Lab	"Dark Mirror", "Solitary Man", "Nemesis"
#11	Jun 2004	Amy Acker, Navi Rawat ('Dana')	Rough guide to Pylea, Set report: "A Hole in the World"	(None)
#12	2004	James Marsters, Steven S. DeKnight, Adam Baldwin ('Hamilton'), Vincent Kartheiser	Angel's penthouse set design, Fred Test (find out if you're as clever as Fred)	-
#13	Jul 2004	Alexis Denisof	Dave Roberts article (famous weatherman and father to David Boreanaz), Stunts feature, Episode Guide (Angel Seasons 4, part 1)	-
#14	Aug 2004	Eliza Dushku	"Not Fade Away" set report, Episode Guide (Angel Seasons 4, part 2), Props feature, 'Angel Eye' (comedy feature about Fang Gang in a reality show)	(None)
#15	Sep 2004	J. August Richards, Ben Edlund, David Denman ('Skip'), Jaime Bergman (portrayed 'Amanda' in "Time Bomb", and wife of David Boreanaz)	Lorne's Karaoke Tips, Special effects feature	(None)
#16	Oct 2004	David Boreanaz	Editing feature, "Not Fade Away" set report, Feature about spider-demons (from Season 4 Jasmine arc), Jeffrey Bell commentary on Season 5 episode (part 1)	(None)
#17	Nov 2004	Christian Kane, Gina Torres ('Jasmine'), Stephanie Romanov	Jeffrey Bell commentary on Season 5 episode (part 2), Top 20 villains, Vampires feature	(None)
Year	Yearbook 2004	Joss Whedon, David Boreanaz, J. August Richards, James Marsters, Amy Acker, Alexis Denisof, Andy Hallett	A-Z of Angel, Season 5 special, a feature on each episode: Whedon on "Conviction", "Just Rewards" - interview with Vicotor Raider Vexler (who portrayed the necromancer Hainsley), "Unleashed" - interview with writer Liz Craft, "Hellbound" - interview with writer Steven S. DeKnight, "Life of the Party" - interview with Ryan Alvarez (portrayed Mr Pee Pee), "The Cautionary Tale of Numero Cinco" - interview with Jeffrey Bell, "Lineage" - interview with director Jefferson Kibbee, "Destiny" - interviews with Sarah Thompson & J. August Richards, "Harm's Way" - feature on the demons in this episode, "Soul Purpose" - feature about the slug monster in episode, "Damage" - interviews with writers Steven S. DeKnight & Drew Goddard, "You're Welcome" - Top 10 Cordy Moments, "Why We Fight" - interview with Eyal Podell (portrayed Sam Lawson) & feature on the Prince of Lies, "Smile Time" - interviews with Whedon & Ben Edlund, "A Hole in the World" - interview with Alex Numan ('Drogun'), "Shells" - interview with Jonathan M. Woodward ('Knox'), "Underneath" - look at Illyria's costume, "Origin" - interview with Jack Conley ('Sahjhan'), "Time Bomb" - interview with Ben Edlund, "The Girl in Question" - interviews with Carole Raphaelle ('Ilona') & Tom Lenk, "Power Play" - interviews with the actors who portrayed the Circle of the Black Thorn, "Not Fade Away" - set phots.	None
#18	Jan 2005	Mercedes McNab, Julie Benz, Juliet Landau, Drew Goddard, Mark Lutz ('Groo')	The Shanshu Prophecy feature	"Book of the Dead", "Love and Death"
#19	Feb 2005	Jeffrey Bell, Sarah Thompson, Jenny Mollen ('Nina'), Sam Anderson ('Holland Manners')	Top 25 Angel episodes	(None)
#20	Mar 2005	James Marsters, David Boreanaz, kelly Manners (Producer of show)	Monsters feature, Wolfram and Hart application form	(None)
#21	Apr 2005	David Greenwalt, Amy Acker, Laurel Holloman ('Justine'), Garry Grubs & Jennifer Griffin (as 'Mr & Mrs Burkle')	Demons feature	-
#22	May 2005	Alexis Denisof	"The Curse" information, Spike quiz, Angel puppet feature, Charisma Carpenter article	(None)
#23	Jun 2005	Andy Hallett, Ryan Alvarez ('Mr Pee-Pee')	Monsters feature, Angel quiz, Wolfram and Hart Health and Safety, Top 20 funniest moments	(None)
#24	July 2005	Jeffrey Bell, Steven S. DeKnight, Ben Edlund, David Fury, Drew Goddard, Elizabeth Craft, Sarah Fain, Valdmir Kulich ('The Beast')	Behind scenes of "The Curse", Huge quiz, Actor/Character profiles	(None)

=== Buffy the Vampire Slayer, incorporating Angel ===
Issue	Date	Interviews	Features	Reviews
#76	Aug 2005	Michelle Trachtenberg, Vincent Kartheiser, Hinton Battle ('Sweet')	Timeline (part 1), What Ifs of the Buffyverse	"Keep Me In Mind", Angel puppet
#77	Sep 2005	Alexa Davalos, Seth Green, K. Todd Reeman ('Mr Trick')	Timeline (part 2), Episode Spotlight: "Lies My Parents Told Me", behind scenes of "Old Times"	"Queen of the Slayers"
#78	Oct 2005	Amber Benson, Clare Kramer, Adam Baldwin, Matthew James ('Merl'), Diana G. Gallagher	Action figure article, Timeline (part 3), Behind scenes of "Spark and Burn", article on the band Splendid	-
#79	Nov 2005	Charisma Carpenter, Christian Kane, Sharon Ferguson ('First Slayer'), Kali Rocha, Tim Minear	Timeline (part 4), How to Survive an Apocalypse, Episode Spotlight: "You're Welcome"	"The Curse" #1-2, "Spark and Burn"
#80	Dec 2005	Alexis Denisof, Anthony Stewart Head, Adam Busch, Andy Hallett	How to be a Watcher, Angel Booster event report, Timeline (part 5), Classic Scene: "Bad Girls"	"Old Times", "The Curse" #3
Year	Yearbook Jan 2006	Joss Whedon, David Boreanaz, Nicholas Brendon, Iyari Limon, Amy Acker, Andy Hallett, and actors who appeared in Buffy/Angel/Firefly (Johnathan Woodward, Jeff Rickets, Carlos Jacott, Andy Umberger)	Year review, Buffy/Angel awards, Boldest Moments, Sarah Michelle Gellar profile, "Now and then" (spotlights Buffyverse pilots and finales), "Seen and Heard" (quotes from actors), and extended quiz.	None
#81	Feb 2006	Jane Espenson, Alyson Hannigan, James Marsters, Sarah Thompson, Carrey Cannon ('Female oracle')	Make-up feature, Episode dissection with Espenson: "Superstar"	"The Curse" #4-5, The Gift (TokyoPop)
#82	Mar 2006	Seth Green, Amy Acker, Jordan Baker ('Sheila Rosenberg', Willow's mum), Jenny Mollen, Bailey Chase ('Graham')	Behind scenes of "Spike: Lost and Found" Episode Spotlight: "Fredless", Unlikely in Love	"Night Terrors", "Colony"
#83	Apr 2006	Drew Greenberg, Eliza Dushku, Dennis Christopher ('Cyvus Vale'), Robia La Morte	Con report, Doyle article, Episode dissection: "The Killer in Me", Buffy 101	"Old Friends" #1, "After Image"
#84	Spring 2005	Danny Strong, J. August Richards, Michele Kelly ('Alonna Gunn')	Angel FAQ, stunts feature, Top 10 recurring characters, Episode Spotlight: "Smile Time"	"Old Times", "Old Friends" #2,
#85	Jun 2006	Alexis Denisof, Julie Benz, Stacey Travis ('Senator Brucker'), Ethan Erickson ('Percy West')	Behind scenes of Angel spotlight comics, Generation gap (article looking at struggles between older and younger characters), The Potentials (interviews with actresses who portrayed various 'potentials') Classic Scene: "In the Dark"	"Old Wounds", "Old Friends" #3
#86	Jul 2006	David Boreanaz, James Leary ('Clem'), Armin Shimerman, Brody Hutzler ('Landok'), T.J. Thyne (Lorne's assistant at W&H)	Buffy Writer's Handbook (part 1 of 7), Episode dissection: "Fear, Itself", Episode Spotlight: "The Wish"	"Old Friends" #4, "Carnival of Souls", "Spike vs Dracula" #1
#87	Aug 2006	Nicholas Brendon, Christian Kane, George Hertzberg, Brigis Brannagh ('Virginia Bryce'), Robert Joseph Levy	Behind scenes of Go Ask Malice, Buffy Writer's Handbook (part 2 of 7), Action figures feature, weapons feature	"Spike vs Dracula" #2, "Spike: Lost and Found", "Old Friends" #5
#88	Sep 2006	Keith R. A. DeCandido (author), David Boreanaz, Vincent Kartheiser, Keith Szarabajka ('Holtz'), James Marsters, Michelle Trachtenberg, Amber Benson, John Billingson (werewolf expert 'Dr Royce')	Buffy Writer's Handbook (part 3 of 7), Buffy's top slayings, Behind scenes of Blackout, Cordelia profile, Episode spotlight: Are You Now or Have You Ever Been, Buffy vs Faith, top Spike moments, Spike timeline, Sets appeal (sets feature on Xander's apartment, Cordelia's apartment, Angel's L.A. lair and more..), Angelus guide to being evil	"Spotlight", Angel scriptbooks (IDW)
#89	Oct 2006	Amy Acker, Clare Kramer, Anthony Stewart Head	Buffy Writer's Handbook (part 4 of 7), "Don't Just Stand There" (feature about stand-ins on Buffy/Angel), "A New Dimension" (about the different dimensions visited during the shows), Classic scene: "Welcome to the Hellmouth"	Go Ask Malice, "Spike vs Dracula" #3, "Spotlight"
#90	Nov 2006	Vincent Kartheiser, Gina Torres ('Jasmine'), Marc Blucas	Buffy Writer's Handbook (part 5 of 7), San Diego Comic Con 2006 report (updates on Buffyverse figures), "Show Some Initiative" (questionnaire about The Initiative), "Top Recurring Angel Characters", Episode Spotlight: "Spin the Bottle"	"Spike vs Dracula" #4, "Doyle Spotlight", "Angel Scriptbook: Five by Five"
#91	Dec/Jan 2007	J. August Richards, James Marsters	Buffy Writer's Handbook (part 6 of 7), Buffy Season 8 feature, the Buffy Awards, Juliet Landau profile, Buffy Christmas feature, Booster Bash convention report, Sets appeal, Classic scene: "Reunion"	"Spike vs Dracula" #5, "Connor Spotlight", Blackout
#92	Feb/Mar 2007	David Boreanaz, Alyson Hannigan, Anthony Stewart Head, Sarah Michelle Gellar, Scott L. Schwartz (guest star in 4 episodes)	Buffy Writer's Handbook (part 7 of 7), "Buffy's Battle of the Sexes" (feature on feminism), Charisma Carpenter profile, James Marsters convention report, Set profiles (school library and principal's office)	"Spike: Asylum" #1, The Return (film starring Gellar), "Angel Scriptbook: Sanctuary"
#93	April/May 2007	Joss Whedon, Steven S. DeKnight, Julie Benz, Amy Acker, Elisabeth Röhm, Scott L. Schwartz (guest star in 4 episodes)	Episode dissection: "Dead Things" (with Steven S. DeKnight), Top ten weapons, Classic scene: "Amends", Booster events "Be scared" convention report, "Good Clean Pun" (feature about punning in Buffy), Set profiles (Buffy's dorm room, Dracula's mansion)	"Spike: Asylum" #2-4, "Masks", "Auld Lang Syne" #1-2, "Portal Through Time"
#94	June/July 2007 (Final issue)	Nicholas Brendon, Juliet Landau, Jo Chen (comic artist), Mercedes McNab, Mark Lutz, Harry Groener, Camden Toy, Keith Szarabajka	Buffy 10th Anniversary panel, Bones companion, Episode spotlight: "All the Way", The Angel Awards, Michelle Trachtenberg profile, "What Not To Wear", Firefly Con Report, So Long, Farewell	"Spike: Asylum" #5, "Auld Lang Syne" #3-4, "Bad Bargain"

== See also ==
- List of Buffyverse comics
- Buffy studies
