= Buffyverse =

Media franchise expanded from Buffy the Vampire Slayer

- Created by: Joss Whedon
- Original work: Buffy the Vampire Slayer (1992)
- Owner: 20th Century Studios
- Years: 1992–present

Print publications
- Novel(s): List of Buffyverse novels
- Comics: List of Buffyverse comics

Films and television
- Film(s): Buffy the Vampire Slayer (1992)
- Television series: Buffy the Vampire Slayer (1997–2003); Angel (1999–2004)

Games
- Traditional: Buffy the Vampire Slayer Collectible Card Game; Angel: The Board Game; Buffy the Vampire Slayer: The Board Game; The Buffy Battles
- Role-playing: Buffyverse role-playing games
- Video game(s): Buffy the Vampire Slayer video games

Audio
- Soundtrack(s): Buffy: The Album; The Score; Radio Sunnydale; Once More, with Feeling; Angel: Live Fast, Die Never
- Original music: Buffy: Christophe Beck; Thomas Wanker; Robert Duncan; Sean Murray; Shawn Clement; Walter Murphy; Douglas Romayne; Nerf Herder (Theme); Angel: Christophe Beck; Robert J. Kral; Darling Violetta (Theme)

Miscellaneous
- Other music: Dingoes Ate My Baby; Velvet Chain (The Buffy EP)
- Audiobook: Slayers: A Buffyverse Story
- List of all Buffyverse canon

The Buffyverse or Slayerverse is a media franchise centered on the supernatural drama television series Buffy the Vampire Slayer and Angel, created by Joss Whedon. The term also refers to the shared fictional universe in which the TV series are set. Originally coined by fans of the series, it has since been used in the titles of published works, and adopted by Whedon.

The Buffyverse is a setting in which supernatural phenomena exist, and supernatural evil can be challenged by people willing to fight against such forces. The franchise includes novels, comics, video games, and other media. Much of the licensed Buffyverse merchandise and media, while released officially, is not considered to be canon within the universe.

== Construction ==
The Buffyverse is a fictional construct created by hundreds of individual stories told through TV, novels, comics and other media. It began with the first episodes of the Buffy the Vampire Slayer television series in 1997 and expanded with the spinoff TV series Angel in 1999. The popularity of these series led to licensed fiction carrying the Buffy and Angel labels.

Outside of the TV series, the Buffyverse has been expanded and elaborated by various authors and artists in the so-called "Buffyverse Expanded Universe". The Buffyverse novels, Buffy video games and the vast majority of Buffyverse comics, are licensed by 20th Century Fox. The works sometimes flesh out background information on characters. For example, Go Ask Malice provides information about the origins of the character Faith Lehane.

The Buffyverse comics were first published by Dark Horse, who have retained the right to produce Buffy comics. IDW now hold the license to produce Angel comics. Joss Whedon wrote an eight-issue miniseries for Dark Horse Comics entitled Fray, about a futuristic vampire slayer. Its final issue was published in August 2003. Pocket Books holds the license to produce Buffy novels, but their license to produce Angel novels expired in 2004.

== Characteristics ==
The Buffyverse is distinguishable from the real world in that it contains and engages with supernatural elements, although only a small proportion of the human population is aware of these phenomena in canon. In regards to its presentation of morality, many elements of the Buffyverse are introduced as being either good or evil, and they are usually linearly handled as such. However, certain instances in the plot call fall under and are handled as more ambiguous or grey areas. A few of the main aspects of the Buffyverse are as follows.

=== The Old Ones ===
The world of the Buffyverse was originally ruled by powerful pure-bred demons: the Old Ones. However, the Old Ones were eventually driven out of the earth's dimension. Any who remained were then vanquished or imprisoned in the "Deeper Well", which manifests as a hole through the earth, with one opening hidden within a tree in England. These demons are revered and worshiped by lesser demon species. They await their chance to return and reclaim Earth.

=== Vampires ===
According to legend in the Buffyverse, the last Old One to leave this dimension fed off a human, and in the process, their blood mixed. The human's body was left without a soul, and an essence of that demon took its place. Rupert Giles details that the resulting creature "bit another, and another, and so they walk the Earth", creating what became known as Vampires. Some elements of traditional vampire mythology are used in the Buffyverse, while others are abandoned. The elements, rules, and customs held by Buffyverse vampires are as follows.

Killing Methods

- Wooden stake through the heart
- Extensive exposure to sunlight (other dimensions' stars may not work the same as Earth's, as Pylea's dual suns did not kill Angel)
- Extensive burning by fire
- Decapitation
- Holy water (ingestion)
- Magical and supernatural devices and spells

Vulnerabilities

- Exposure to holy water
- Physical contact with a cross
- Limited exposure to sunlight
- Limited exposure to fire
- Possession by other supernatural creatures and forces
- Supernatural spells and devices

Features

- Cannot enter private dwellings unless invited.
- Vampires' bodies and clothes explode to dust when slain (except for articles of importance, such as magical rings, amulets, etc.)
- Have no reflection (however, they do have a shadow and can appear in photos)
- Superhuman strength, endurance, speed, and senses
- Have no soul (unless it is in some way restored such as with Angel and later Spike)
- Cannot have children (unless foretold by prophecy, such as Angel and Darla's son, Connor)
- Bullets cannot kill vampires, but can cause them extreme pain.
- In the first episode, garlic is seen in Buffy's trunk along with stakes, crosses, and holy water. It is also used by Buffy in "Wrecked" to repel Spike. Also, in the episode "The Wish", which explored an episode where Buffy Summers never came to Sunnydale, and vampires ruled the city, garlic is seen lining the lockers of Sunnydale High.
- In that same episode, "The Wish", it was alluded that bright colors attract vampires, and therein the townspeople wear dark, muted colors.
- They can be tranquilized.
- Can become intoxicated by consuming alcohol or the blood of a human who is intoxicated with drugs. This fact's first application can be attributed to Spike within season two. He claims that after he drank from a hippie at Woodstock, he spent "the next six hours watching [his] hand move". This fact is consistent with season four of Angel, wherein Faith becomes high on the drug orpheus and allows Angelus to feed on her, causing him to react to the drug as well.

=== Werewolves ===
As within historical werewolf mythology, werewolves are people who suffer from lycanthropy. In the Buffyverse, werewolf characters are shown to have an "animal side" which either complements or clashes with their "human side". They transform on the full moon of each month, as well as on the day before and the day after. Some werewolves have shown the ability to gain control/achieve harmony between their human and bestial sides (such as Oz and his teacher in the comics). Prominent werewolf characters include Oz, Veruca, and Nina Ash.

=== Demons ===
In the Buffyverse, the term "demon" is inexact; it has been applied to just about every creature that is not a god, robot, unmodified human, or standard terrestrial animal. Some classes of creature, such as Vampires and Old Ones, are commonly known as "demons" but are not always referred to as such.

Portrayed within the Buffyverse, there are many kinds of demons of many differing natures and origins. Some demons are shown to live and reproduce on Earth (the Bezoar in "Bad Eggs"), but others are extraterrestrial (the Queller demon in "Listening to Fear"), extradimensional (Lorne on Angel), ex-humans (Anya Jenkins was a peasant who became a vengeance demon), and even hybrids (Cordelia Chase had aspects of demon fused in her). Some species of demon are capable of breeding with humans (Doyle has a human mother and a demon father). Anya Jenkins states in the episode "Graduation Day" that the demons that walk the earth are not pure demons, they are half-breeds. She states that true demons are "bigger", in reference to Mayor Richard Wilkins' Ascension into a true demon.

Many demons in Buffy are shown to be inherently evil and solely interested in causing suffering, death, and harm. Other characters challenge this notion however, with demons such as Clem and Lorne who appear to be basically good.

=== Slayers ===
In the Buffyverse, long ago, a group of shamans once used the essence of a demon to produce the First Slayer. She was banished from her own village and forced to fight the forces of darkness alone. When she died, another girl was "chosen" in her place. The line of Slayers is maintained over the years until Buffy's two deaths and revivals cause a disturbance that ultimately leads to the awakening of the First Evil.

The Slayer is given great strength, lightning reflexes, fast healing powers and is naturally highly skilled with many weapons and martial arts.

=== Watchers ===
Within the Buffyverse, the Watchers' Council historically exists to offer guidance to the Slayer; assisting them by supervising their training and by researching existing and possible demonic or supernatural threats. Notable Watchers include Rupert Giles, Watcher of series protagonist Buffy, and Wesley Wyndam-Pryce, who takes over temporarily in season 3.

=== "The Good Fight" ===
While most of humanity in the Buffyverse seems oblivious to the existence of demons, there exists other groups and organizations battling against evil, and these factions come to light over the course of Buffy and Angel and in related media. For example, a group of socially disadvantaged youth in L.A. organized to battle the vampires destroying their community (See Charles Gunn). And, although some of their methods and goals proved questionable, a government-funded group known as The Initiative was also long aware of the existence of demons and was revealed to be fighting a secret war against them. Other large-scale groups appear in both Buffy and Angel, often as antagonists to the heroes due to differing views on how to, as they say, fight the good fight.

=== Magic ===
Magic in the Buffyverse can be used for all manner of control. Spells can be performed by anyone by use of magical items and the invocation of particular words. Witches and warlocks, however, have considerably more knowledge and power to use it for their purposes than the average person.

A witch can inherit their lineage from their parents or develop their craft over many years, and neither a witch nor warlock must necessarily be human, such as Cyvus Vail.

=== Humans with powers ===
While not prominent in the Buffyverse, there are select few individuals who gain special powers through means other than those mentioned above. Gwen Raiden and Bethany (from the Angel episode "Untouched") both seem to have been born with their powers. Drusilla had psychic powers as a human before becoming a vampire, though their origins are never explained. Others, like Marcie Ross from the episode "Out of Mind, Out of Sight" or the trio of Nerds, gain their powers by other magical, non-magical, or "scientific" means. Connor is also a human with supernatural powers, similar to those of vampires, because he was born as a product of two vampire parents.

=== Technology ===
Technology in the Buffyverse is more advanced than in the real world at the time it was produced, although the applications of such technologies do not seem to be common knowledge. Examples of advanced technology include:

- The demon Moloch has an advanced robotic body built for him to inhabit. ("I, Robot... You, Jane")
- Inventor Ted Buchanan built a highly advanced android version of himself in the 1950s that was capable of impersonating a human being without drawing suspicion. ("Ted")
- Warren Mears builds a lifelike android named April as a companion in the episode "I Was Made to Love You", then builds the Buffybot for Spike as well as an android version of himself. He later forms and leads the Trio as their technology guru. The trio is later shown to use a freeze ray ("Smashed"), an invisibility ray ("Gone"), a Cerebral Dampener capable of removing someone's free will ("Dead Things"), and jet packs ("Seeing Red").
- Pete Clarner is shown to create a chemical compound that gives him highly enhanced strength ("Beauty and the Beasts").

Additionally, there is much technology specifically geared towards use both by and against the supernatural, used by the government organization known as "The Initiative" and the demonic law firm Wolfram & Hart.

=== Multiverse ===
A Buffy multiverse is established in season 3 of Buffy the Vampire Slayer episodes "The Wish" and "Doppelgangland", and then referred to in subsequent series of Buffy, Angel, and their comic book continuations. Some comic book continuations following the Buffy TV show, notably those published by BOOM! Studios, have used the existence of the multiverse as part of their premise, as well as a story device within the series.

The multiverse is set within a wider cosmology of "hell dimensions" inhabited mainly or primarily by demons, whose existence drives the plot of Buffy season five, some of which are also visited in episodes of Angel.

Universe	Description
Prime timeline	The main continuity of Buffy the Vampire Slayer and Angel, spanning the TV series, "canon" Dark Horse and IDW comics, and the Fray comic books.
"The Wish" universe	Introduced in "The Wish" after Cordelia wished that "Buffy never came to Sunnydale", this dimension saw the Master reign supreme before the wish was reversed. The dimension was revisited in "Doppelgangland", establishing that it is not a distinct parallel universe.
World Without Shrimp	An alternate universe where shrimp do not exist, referenced humorously by Anya in the episodes "Superstar" and "Triangle", and mentioned again in the Angel & Faith Dark Horse Comics series.
World With Nothing But Shrimp	A universe composed entirely of shrimp by Anya in "Triangle", mentioned in Angel & Faith, and later visited during Buffy the Vampire Slayer Season Ten.
World Without Rubber	A universe where rubber does not exist, mentioned in Buffy the Vampire Slayer Season Eight #22.
World Without Fish	A reality where fish do not exist, referenced in Angel & Faith #10.
BOOM! Studios universe	A modern reboot of Buffy set in 2019/early 2020s with major changes to character dynamics and lore, using the likenesses of the original actors. Major plot differences include Xander Harris becoming a vampire.
Universe 37	A universe where the Scooby Gang cast a spell causing Willow to take over Buffy's identity as the Slayer, diverging from both the TV series and the preceding BOOM! reboot series, depicted in The Vampire Slayer. Other plot differences include Xander being gay.
Fray alternate future	A dystopian 23rd-century world where magic has been banished and the Slayer legacy is nearly forgotten; the setting of Fray. The future is changed in the conclusion of Buffy the Vampire Slayer Season Twelve.
Pylea	A medieval demon realm where humans are enslaved, visited by Angel and his team in Angel season 2.
Quor'toth	Described as the darkest of all worlds, it's a hell dimension visited in Angel season 3.

== Canon ==
Using the religious analogy of a canon of scripture (see Biblical canon), things that are not canon are considered "apocryphal." When a body of work is not specifically accepted or rejected by an authority, "canon" can be a fluid term that is interpreted differently by different people. This is the case with "Buffyverse canon", which has yet to be publicly defined by an authority to the satisfaction and consensus of all observers (see: links to canon debates). The creator of the Buffyverse, Joss Whedon, has implied that additional materials he was not heavily involved in creating were separate from canon. When asked in an interview about canon, Whedon stated:

Canon is key, as is continuity. If you are massive nerd. Which I am. I believe there's a demarcation between the creation and ancillary creations by different people. I'm all for that stuff, just like fanfic, but I like to know what's there's an absolutely official story-so-far, especially when something changes mediums, which my stuff seems to do a lot.

This is an overview of what has been dubbed official Buffyverse canon by the series creator Joss Whedon:

- All 144 episodes of Buffy the Vampire Slayer
- All 110 episodes of Angel
- The 1999 comic series The Origin
- The Buffy the Vampire Slayer Season Eight comic series and related one-shots
- The Buffy the Vampire Slayer Season Nine and Angel and Faith comic series, as well as spin-offs (Spike: A Dark Place and Willow: Wonderland)
- The Buffy the Vampire Slayer Season Ten and Angel and Faith Volume 2 comic series
- The Buffy the Vampire Slayer Season Eleven and Angel comic series and Giles spin-off
- The Buffy the Vampire Slayer Season Twelve comic series
- The Angel: After the Fall comic series (#1–17)
- The Spike: After the Fall comic series
- The Spike comic series
- The Fray comic series
- The Tales of the Slayers one-shot
- The Tales of the Vampires comic series

=== Comics and novels ===
Outside of the TV series, the Buffyverse has been expanded and elaborated on by various authors and artists in the so-called "Buffyverse Expanded Universe". The Buffyverse novels and Buffyverse comics are licensed by 20th Century Fox, but are generally considered 'less real' within the Buffyverse (apocryphal).

Despite this, they have been licensed as official Buffy the Vampire Slayer or Angel merchandise. Furthermore, many authors have said that Whedon or his office have had to approve their overall outline for their novel or comic if not the final product. This was to prevent the stories venturing too far from the original intentions of Buffy/Angel stories (see below). These works are commonly considered non-canon. Jeff Mariotte, author of Buffyverse novels and comics has said:

The rule in licensed fiction is that what's on the screen is canon, and the rest is not.

==== Joss Whedon ====
Work created with Joss Whedon's involvement has been described as canon by commentators, and by Whedon himself. For example, he announced in 2005:

Darkhorse Comics are starting a new Buffy comic, and as I understand it, it will take place after the end of Buffy and Angel and be canon in the Buffy world. And I understand it that way 'cause I'm writing it!

In a separate interview, Whedon spoke of the planning process for the series:

I basically said, "We could do something and for once we could make it canon. We could make it officially what happened after the end of the show."

Whedon has also written the comic mini-series Long Night's Journey, as well as short stories for Tales of the Slayers and Tales of the Vampires.

Fray is an eight-part comic series written by Whedon, about a Vampire Slayer of the future named Melaka Fray. In the Buffyverse, a powerful scythe used by Buffy is found in centuries to come by Melaka Fray. In 2001, whilst Whedon was still producing Buffy, he spoke about his concern of implications of information established by Fray (and Buffy comics generally) affecting the canon Buffyverse:

When it comes to Buffy, I do the show and that's it. Anything I do in a comic might interfere with the canon, or interfere with what I'm doing on the show. With Fray, I thought, okay, I'll do something new, that's in the Buffy universe so that I don't have to create a whole new universe for my first foray into comics. It can therefore be of interest to the fans, yet not interfere with anything.

However, the Buffy series finale did not match continuity set by Fray. In Fray no mention is made of the Slayer's essence being split amongst multiple women. When asked about the apparent contradictions between Buffy and Fray, Whedon responded:

No, that's actually something I hope to deal with, either in the Spike format or in another series of Fray. There's a discrepancy there that I plan to explain. I have a vision for it.

In an interview with TV Guide, Whedon revealed that he considered TV tie-in comics to be "ancillary" unless written by the script-writers:

"TVGuide.com: Have you seen the Battlestar Galactica comic?

Whedon: No, I don't think I can do it. I love Battlestar too hard. I couldn't look at any ancillary work.

TVGuide.com: I love Buffy "hard," so are you saying we fans shouldn't read the [Buffy the Vampire Slayer season eight (by Whedon)]?

Whedon: No, because if they stopped doing Battlestar Galactica, and then two or three years later Ron Moore and David Eick said, "We ourselves are going to continue the story in comic-book form—as opposed to something ancillary to the show done by other people," then I would be all over it. That's not to say the Battlestar comic isn't great, but I love that show the way other people love Buffy. I love it unreasonably."

==== Mutant Enemy ====
Several of the comics have been written by the scriptwriters of Mutant Enemy Productions. Doug Petrie wrote comics Ring of Fire, Double Cross, and Bad Dog. Jane Espenson has written comics (Haunted, Jonathan, and Reunion), as well as two Tales of the Slayer prose shorts ("Again, Sunnydale" and "Two Teenage Girls at the Mall"). Rebecca Rand Kirshner also wrote a prose short story for Tales of the Slayer, "The War Between the States".

==== Buffyverse cast ====
Three actors have co-authored comics with Christopher Golden. James Marsters, who portrayed Spike, co-authored "Paint the Town Red", Amber Benson co-authored Willow & Tara. Benson also wrote the comic short story "The Innocent" and Nicholas Brendon wrote for Xander's character in many issues of season 10.

==== Works by other authors ====
All other Buffyverse comics and novels were written by authors that were not involved with any level of production of the television series Buffy the Vampire Slayer or Angel. The creators of these works are generally free to tell their own stories set in the Buffyverse, and may or may not keep to established continuity. Similarly, writers for the TV series were under no obligation to use continuity which has been established by the Expanded Universe, and sometimes contradicted it.

==== Continuity problems ====
Usually the authors and editors of these licensed materials try not to contradict information that has been established by canon. However, many of the materials do directly contradict it. Jeff Mariotte has said:

Sometimes stuff shows up on screen that contradicts what you wrote, and sometimes the timing is such that a book comes out after the episode that contradicts it airs.

For example, according to Monster Island, Spike and Gunn meet in the Hyperion Hotel in Angel Season 3; however, the canonical Angel TV series later established that Spike and Gunn meet in the Wolfram and Hart L.A. offices in Angel Season 5.

Some of the licensed materials successfully avoid contradicting any information given in episodes. For example, How I Survived My Summer Vacation features short stories that take place after Buffy season 1 but before season 2.

==== Joss Whedon's involvement ====
A number of comments by Buffyverse writers have indicated that although they know they are not writing Buffyverse canon, overviews for their stories may still have been checked over by Whedon.

Referring to Whedon, Christopher Golden said:

He has to approve everything. I should say, his office has to approve everything, so sometimes he gets more involved than others in doing those approvals.

In a separate interview, Golden said:

There are times in both books and comics when I know he has gotten involved because the word, sort of, comes down from him.

Similarly, Peter David was asked about his comic, Spike: Old Times, and said:

Ostensibly comments came from Whedon, although for all I know, it was from an associate.

Jeff Mariotte has revealed more detail of the approval process:

I come up with a proposal that's eight or ten pages long and I submit that to Pocket Books. They read it and if they like it then they submit it to 20th Century Fox and the Buffy office. If everybody approves it then I can get to work ... if I proposed doing something that was counter to what they wanted the direction of the character to be, they would tell me.

Mariotte implies that little input is given, only acceptance or rejection of general ideas:

In the world of licensing there is a difference between 'approval' and 'input', and I'm not sure what the legal relationship between Fox and Mutant Enemy is. My impression is that Fox is doing everything in its power to make sure Joss is happy with what we do, and I know that Joss is looking at everything and making comments or thumbs-up, thumbs-down on stuff.

When asked how much attention he pays to licensed works, Whedon said:

Not very much. I just don’t have time. I give them a few guidelines of things they should stay away from, things that we’re going to be dealing with or things that would disrupt the canon or things that are just antithetical to what I believe in.

Elsewhere, Whedon has pointed out that he has never entirely read a single Buffy novel, and has little time to devote to such material. He therefore knows little of the final product, or of their quality control.

==== Sanction by Joss Whedon ====
In one instance, Whedon has endorsed a comic neither written nor supervised by him, The Origin by Christopher Golden and Dan Brereton, as canonical. An adaptation of the 1992 Buffy film which was reworked to fit the television series' continuity, Whedon said this of the comic:

The origin comic, though I have issues with it, CAN pretty much be accepted as canonical. They did a cool job of combining the movie script (the SCRIPT) with the series, that was nice, and using the series Merrick.

Brian Lynch, writer of Spike: Asylum and Spike: Shadow Puppets, had no involvement in the production of the Buffy or Angel television series, but was charged by Joss Whedon with producing the canonical comic series Angel: After The Fall. Betta George, a character created by Lynch, has since been brought into the official canon. Angel: After the Fall also makes explicit reference to Spike: Asylum within its pages. When After the Fall became an ongoing series penned by various writers, the canonicity of later stories became somewhat nebulous without the explicit say-so of those involved or Whedon himself.

== Other Buffy productions ==
Excluding the Buffy and Angel television episodes, novels, and comics, there have been a variety of other official productions in the Buffy franchise. They are largely regarded as apocryphal, and some are contradicted by other canonical works.

=== Buffy the Vampire Slayer (1992 film) ===
Buffy the Vampire Slayer, the 1992 comedy film starring Kristy Swanson as Buffy, was written by Joss Whedon and directed by Fran Rubel Kuzui. In 2001, Whedon described his experience watching the film:

I finally sat down and had written it and somebody had made it into a movie, and I felt like – well, that's not quite her. It's a start, but it's not quite the girl.

The film contradicts continuity established by the Buffy television series; for example, the nature of vampires differs in significant ways: in the film, vampires do not have "vamp" faces whilst feeding, and can fly. They also do not turn into dust when killed. As noted above, the canonicity of this film is superseded by The Origin.

=== Television pilots ===
Whedon wrote and partly funded a 25-minute unaired Buffy pilot to help sell the series concept, but he was not happy with the final product (he has been quoted in an interview about the pilot, "It sucks on ass"). The story is nearly identical to the plot of the first Buffy episode, "Welcome to the Hellmouth", which supersedes it in canon; there are minor canonical changes, including the recasting of some roles and slight personality changes for some characters.

The unaired Angel pitch tape was produced prior to that series. It features Angel speaking toward the camera (possibly breaking the Fourth wall) and narrating action seen in clips.

=== Video games ===
The Buffy the Vampire Slayer video games do not contradict continuity established by the series. Furthermore, many of the actors from the shows have provided their voices for the games. Joss Whedon was involved in Chaos Bleeds, and appears in the game's special features.

=== Undeveloped productions ===
Mutant Enemy Productions have at various times gone into the early stages of development with potential Buffyverse spinoffs that were ultimately unproduced. Faith the Vampire Slayer, Ripper, Slayer School, and the Spike movie would have taken place within the same fictional continuity. Buffy the Animated Series might have followed a slightly alternative continuity since promotional artwork has shown that the Sunnydale High library would have looked dramatically different from in the Buffy episodes.

The David Fury-written script "Corrupt" establishes an alternative continuity after the premiere Angel episode, "City of". Events that take place in the story are instead superseded by the continuity of the second Angel episode, "Lonely Hearts", the episode which was written to replace "Corrupt".

== Unofficial works ==
Various works are not licensed by 20th Century Fox as Buffy/Angel merchandise, and do not have any involvement from any Buffyverse cast and crew. These include adult (pornographic) parodies and fan films.

== See also ==
- Buffy studies
- Buffyverse canon
