= List of Angel novels =

Angel novels have been published since 2000 by Pocket Books. The last was published in 2004.

== Chronology ==
=== Season 1 ===
These Buffyverse tales take place during Buffy season 4, and Angel season 1 (from autumn 1999 to spring 2000).

Title	Setting	Author	Published	ISBN-13
City Of	L.A. 1999	Nancy Holder	December 1999	9780671041441
City Of	Novelization of the Series Premiere.			
Not Forgotten	L.A. 1999	Nancy Holder	April 2000	9780671041458
Not Forgotten	Angel Investigations tries to help some struggling immigrants.			
Close to the Ground	L.A. 1999	Jeff Mariotte	August 2000	9780671041472
Close to the Ground	A big Hollywood studio head recruits Angel to act as a bodyguard for his daughter, but Angel is simultaneously being hunted by a wizard who seeks the secret behind Angel's status as an immortal with a soul.			
Soul Trade	L.A. 1999	Tom Sniegoski	June 2001	9780743406994
Soul Trade	A girl's soul is mysteriously taken. Angel investigates, but soon discovers a black market where souls are bought and traded... and his soul just became the new hot item on the market.			
Redemption	L.A. 1999	Mel Odom	June 2000	9780671041465
Redemption	A wealthy actress who plays a vampire on TV requests help when she faces attacks by a group who seem to genuinely believe that she is a vampire, but Angel is confused by her resemblance to one of his first victims as Angelus.			
Shakedown	L.A. 1999	Don DeBrandt	December 2000	9780743406963
Shakedown	Doyle has a vision of a seismic shift.			
Hollywood Noir	L.A. 1999	Jeff Mariotte	February 2001	9780743406970
Hollywood Noir	A decayed corpse at a Hollywood construction site is a sign of dire events, especially when a long-dead private detective reappears to finish his last case while Doyle has a vision of the grave of the P.I.'s last client.			
Avatar	L.A. 1999	John Passarella	February 2001	9780743406987
Avatar	Cordelia suggests beginning a Web site for their detective agency, but Angel soon discovers that a demon is hunting victims on the internet to steal their life-force and create a new body for itself.			
Bruja	L.A. 1999	Mel Odom	September 2001	9780743407014
Bruja	L.A. is shocked when a woman attacks a priest, leading to Angel Investigations discovering that a ruthless spirit of vengeance has been unleashed.			
The Summoned	L.A. 1999	Cameron Dokey	January 2002	9780743407007
The Summoned	An anxious young woman, Terri Miller, arrives in L.A., and Doyle discovers that she is connected to recent violent deaths.			
Unseen (trilogy)	Sunnydale, L.A., 2000			
Unseen (trilogy)	Buffy and Angel have to work together to solve disappearances of teenagers and calm down the gang warfare going on in LA.			

=== Season 2 ===
These Buffyverse tales take place during Buffy season 5, and Angel season 2 (from autumn 2000 to spring 2001).

Title	Setting	Author	Published	ISBN-13
Image	L.A., 1950s, 2000	Mel Odom	May 2002	9780743427500
Image	An old evil is trying to use a painting to achieve great power, and an artist who once painted Darla and unintentionally inspired Mary Shelley to write Frankenstein is involved.			
Stranger to the Sun	L.A., 2000	Jeff Mariotte	July 2002	9780743427524
Stranger to the Sun	Wesley opens a strange package and is sent into a coma where he dreams of being trapped in a mine, as a vampire attempts a ritual that will bring permanent darkness to the world.			
Vengeance	L.A., 2001	Scott Ciencin and Dan Jolley	August 2002	9780743427548
Vengeance	Lily Pierce's motivational speaking spreads across the city.			
Haunted	L.A., 2001	Jeff Mariotte	March 2002	9780743427487
Haunted	Cordelia enters a haunted house for reality TV, but subsequently has a vision about a contestant that didn't make the final cut.			

=== Season 3 ===
These Buffyverse tales take place around Buffy season 6, and Angel Season 3 (from autumn 2001 to spring 2002).

Title	Setting	Author	Published	ISBN-13
Cursed	L.A., 2001	Mel Odom	November 2003	9780689864377
Cursed	When Spike is hired to steal an ancient artifact that is connected to a woman whom he and Angelus were once hired to kill, Angel and Spike must deal with their shared evil pasts and break an ancient curse that was placed on them.			
Sanctuary	L.A., 2001	Jeff Mariotte	April 2003	9780689856648
Sanctuary	A loud explosion occurs at Caritas and Fred is captured, prompting Lorne to try to question the guests while Angel Investigations conduct their own search.			
The Longest Night	L.A., 2001	Various (anthology)	December 2002	9780743427562
The Longest Night	It's December 21, and hour by hour Angel and his crew must survive the longest night of the year.			
Monster Island	Sunnydale, L.A., Monster Island, 2001	Christopher Golden and Thomas E. Sniegoski	March 2003	9780689856655
Monster Island	The Fang Gang and the Scooby Gang must unite to protect a safe-haven of half-blood demons from a supremacist group led by none other than the demonic father of Angel's dead friend Doyle.			
Endangered Species	L.A., 2001	Nancy Holder and Jeff Mariotte	October 2002	9780689862106
Endangered Species	Angel considers the ethics of wiping out all vampires when he discovers a plan to wipe out the being who created them, and finds himself pitted against one of Drusilla's first victims.			
Impressions	L.A., 2001	Doranna Durgin	February 2003	9780743427586
Impressions	A desperate man arrives at the Hotel with a demon chasing him, having been tricked by a man posing as Angel because he likes the thrill of killing demons.			
Fearless	L.A.	Doranna Durgin	October 2003	9780689864315
Fearless	The characters of Angel Investigations have been affected by demon pixie dust.			

=== Season 4 ===
These Buffyverse tales take place around Buffy season 7, and Angel season 4 (from autumn 2002 to spring 2003).

Title	Setting	Author	Published	ISBN-13
Seven Crows	Mexico, 2002	John Vornholt	July 2003	9780743468657
Seven Crows	Between Mexico and Arizona Riley and Sam Finn call in Buffy and Angel to investigate mysterious supernatural events.			
Dark Mirror	L.A., 2002	Craig Shaw Gardner	April 2004	9780689867019
Dark Mirror	The gang must face dark versions of themselves when a group of demons target them in an attempt to 'recruit' an Angelus duplicate as their leader.			
Heat	Sunnydale, L.A., 2002	Nancy Holder	June 2004	9780689860171
Heat	Buffy and Angel both battle the same ancient evil, a Possessor who was once "Qin", and Angel's old ally/adversary Jhiera is working with their enemy.			
Solitary Man	L.A., 2002	Jeff Mariotte	December 2003	9780743477963
Solitary Man	Team Angel copes with a detective-wannabe-old women.			
Love and Death	L.A., 2002	Jeff Mariotte	September 2004	9780743495547
Love and Death	Demon-killers are provoked by an outspoken radio host, putting Angel, Connor and Lorne at risk			
Monolith	L.A., 2002	John Passarella	May 2004	9780689870224
Monolith	A huge monolith suddenly appears at Hollywood Boulevard.			
Nemesis	L.A., 2003	Scott and Denise Ciencin	February 2004	9780743489973
Nemesis	One of Fred's old friends from graduate school contacts her for help at a big scientific facility.			
Book of the Dead	L.A., 2003	Ashley McConnell	July 2004	9780743492348
Book of the Dead	Wesley's former-Watcher colleague arrives at LA for a rare book auction.			

== Authors ==
Authors who have written Angel novels:

- Scott Ciencin
- Denise Ciencin
- Don DeBrandt
- Cameron Dokey
- Doranna Durgin
- Craig Shaw Gardner
- Christopher Golden
- Christie Golden
- Nancy Holder
- Dan Jolley
- Ashley McConnell
- Jeff Mariotte
- Yvonne Navarro
- Mel Odom
- John Passarella
- Thomas E. Sniegoski

== Canonical issues ==
The books featured in this list are not part of Buffyverse canon. They are not considered as official Buffyverse reality, but are novels from the authors' imaginations. Unlike internet fan fiction however, all of these stories have been licensed as official Angel merchandise. Furthermore, the overall concept for each Buffyverse story had to be accepted by Joss Whedon (or his office), who did not want these stories to venture too far from his original intentions.

== See also ==
- List of Buffyverse novels
- List of Buffy the Vampire Slayer novels
- List of television series made into books
