= Angel (comics) =

Angel, in comics, may refer to:

- Angel comics, comics featuring the Buffyverse character Angel
- Warren Worthington III, a Marvel Comics character and member of the X-Men who has used the names Angel and Archangel
- Angel (Thomas Halloway), the character Thomas Halloway, published by Marvel's predecessor Timely Comics
- Angel Salvadore, a Marvel Comics character from the X-Men, who used the name Angel as well as Tempest
- Angels (Marvel Comics), supernatural characters based on the angels of various religions
- Angel (2000 AD), a character and story from 2000 AD

== See also ==
- Angel (disambiguation)
