= Doranna Durgin =

American author

- Born: July 25, 1960 (age 66); Pittsburgh, Pennsylvania, U.S.
- Education: Ohio State University
- Occupation: Novelist
- Writing career
- Genres: Fantasy, Romance, Science fiction
- Website: changespell.com

Doranna Durgin (born July 25, 1960) is an American author of fantasy, science fiction, and romantic suspense novels. In 1995 she won the Compton Crook Award for the novel Dun Lady's Jess. Durgin's works feature suspense elements and distinctive descriptions of animals and their behavior.

== Early life ==
Durgin was born on July 25, 1960, in Pittsburgh, Pennsylvania. She holds a bachelor's degree from Ohio State University. Her stated interests include dog training, horseback riding and dressage, painting, and photography.

== Career ==
Durgin's debut novel, Dun Lady's Jess, was published by Baen Books in 1994 and won the Compton Crook/Stephen Tall Award for best first science fiction, fantasy, or horror book from the Baltimore Science Fiction Society in 1995. The novel, part of what became the Changespell Saga, follows a horse magically transformed into a woman; a Kliatt reviewer praised Durgin's evident knowledge of horses and horsemanship. Durgin continued the series with Changespell (1996), Barrenlands (1998), and Changespell Legacy (2002), and wrote a companion fantasy series, the "King's Wolf Saga," beginning with Touched by Magic (1996).

Many of Durgin's subsequent novels, including Wolf Justice, Wolverine's Daughter, and A Feral Darkness, combine fantasy plots with a recurring focus on dogs and other animals. She also wrote media tie-in fiction, including the Star Trek: The Next Generation novel Tooth and Claw (2001) and a novel based on Gene Roddenberry's Earth: Final Conflict television series, which a Booklist reviewer called "one of the more intelligent" entries in that series' line of tie-in novels. In the early 2000s she wrote several novels and novellas set in the Buffy/Angel franchise, and later published a run of romantic-suspense titles for Silhouette's Bombshell line.

Durgin is a member of the Science Fiction and Fantasy Writers of America and has also worked as a web designer. As of 2018, she had published more than fifty novels across fantasy, mystery, paranormal romance, and romantic suspense, and had begun self-publishing new work, including the "Reckoners" trilogy, alongside her traditionally published titles.

== Works ==
=== The Changespell Saga ===
Fantasy novels about Dun Lady's Jess, a spirited young mare, her rider Carey, and their friends.

1. Dun Lady's Jess Baen 1994 ISBN 978-0-671-87617-3, reprinted 2007 Star Ink ISBN 978-0-88995-398-7
2. Changespell Baen 1997 ISBN 978-0-671-87765-1
3. Changespell Legacy Baen 2002 ISBN 978-0-7434-3544-4
- Barrenlands (prequel) Baen 1998 ISBN 978-0-671-87872-6

=== The King's Wolf Saga ===
Reandn and friends.

1. Touched by Magic Baen 1996 ISBN 978-0-671-87737-8
2. Wolf Justice Baen 1998 ISBN 978-0-671-87891-7

=== Star Trek ===
- Tooth and Claw (2001). ISBN 978-0-743-41949-9. Based on the Star Trek: The Next Generation television series, set in the year 2371.

=== Buffyverse ===
Novels relating to the fictional universe established by Buffy and Angel:

- Tales of the Slayer, Vol. 1 (2003, short story)
- Impressions (Angel novel) (2003)
- Fearless (Angel novel) (2003)
- Short stories within The Longest Night (Angel novel) (2002)

=== Other works ===
- Seer's Blood Baen 2000 ISBN 978-0-671-57877-0
- Feral Darkness Baen 2001 ISBN 978-0-671-31994-6
- Mage Knight 2: Dark Debts Ballantine 2003 ISBN 978-0-345-45969-5
- Wolverine's Daughter Baen 2000 ISBN 978-0-671-57847-3
