= List of Buffyverse comics =

This is a List of Buffyverse comics including different categories of different types of publications.

== Categories ==
=== Buffy comics ===
These were published by Dark Horse, originally in comic format but then gathered into volumes of trade paperbacks. They were published from 1998 until 2004. A small number of Buffy comics have not been included in trade paperbacks. These include the comics: Giles, Jonathan, and Reunion. Dark Horse, under the guidance of Joss Whedon, reinstated the series in 2007 as a canonical continuation of the series.

=== Angel comics ===
Dark Horse published two Angel comic series, the first of which was halted after 17 issues while the second lasted only four issues. Since June 2005, IDW have published a 17-issue limited series, a spin-off ongoing series as well as several miniseries and one shots with Angel characters.

=== Tales of the Vampires ===
This comprises an anthology of short stories written by Joss Whedon, Jane Espenson, and other writers of the Buffy TV shows. Each story tells the tale of one or more Buffyverse vampires.

=== Tales of the Slayers ===
This is an anthology of short stories written by Joss Whedon, Jane Espenson, and others. Like the prose short stories, each of these surrounds a different slayer from the past.

=== Unofficial parody ===
There has been a sexually explicit satirical graphic novel, Boffy the Vampire Layer, which is not officially licensed as Buffy merchandise by 20th Century Fox. It was published by Eros Graphic Albums in 2002.

== Canonical issues ==
Buffy comics are not usually considered by fans as canonical. However, unlike fanfiction, overviews summarizing their story, written early in the writing process, were "approved" by both Fox and Joss Whedon (or his office), and the books were therefore later published as official Buffy merchandise.

== Chronology ==
=== Ancient ===
These tales take place from ancient times up until 1900.

Buffyverse stories	Location, time (if known)
Tales of the Slayers comic: Prologue	Ancient
Follows the prehistoric first Slayer, as she is rejected by her village and instructed to fight alone.
Tales of the Slayer I, short story: A Good Run	Greece, 490 B.C.E.
A tale about a Greek slave that becomes a slayer.
Tales of the Slayers comic: Righteous	England, approx. 1400
A Slayer operating within a walled medieval town during a period of witch-hunts.
Tales of the Slayer I, short story: The White Doe	London/America, 1586
An English-American Slayer that grew up among Native Americans.
Tales of the Slayers comic: The Innocent	France, 1789
Claudine is the Slayer during the French Revolution.
Angel comic: Angel vs. Frankenstein: The Heir (Part I)	Switzerland, 1800
Angelus finds himself in Geneva and pretends to be the heir to the Frankenstein family fortune. Frankenstein's monster tries to stop him.
Tales of the Vampires comic: Some Like it Hot	Europe, early 19th Century
A vampire seeks fun in the sun through some unusual surgery.
Tales of the Slayers comic: Presumption	England, 1813
Elizabeth Weston has to operate in the English upper-class society of 1813.
Tales of the Vampires comic: Jack	London, November 1888
Another crime is reported to the police. Inspector Whitcomb is on Jack's case but holds a secret of his own.
Angel comic: Spike vs Dracula (Part I)	London, 1898
With Angelus gone, Spike finds a Rival that he will not soon forget.
Tales of the Vampires framing story	England, late 19th Century
Young Watchers are taught at a Watcher's academy, about vampires by hearing tales from a captive vampire, Roche.
Tales of the Vampires comic: The Glittering World	Sunnydale, late 19th century
The American West and a Navajo Slayer.
Angel: Barbary Coast	19th century
After begin cursed by clan Kalderash and subsequently rejected by Darla, Angel travelled to San Francisco to find a cure.

=== Modern ===
These Buffyverse tales take place from 1900 to 1995.

Buffyverse stories	Location, time (if known)
Angel comic: Blood & Trenches	1920
After WWI.
Angel comic: Angel vs. Frankenstein (Part II)	New York, 1920
Focusing on the continued rivalry between Angel and Frankenstein's monster.
Tales of the Vampires comic: Father	1922 onwards
The tale of a long relationship between a vampire and his human son told over the lifespan of the latter.
Tales of the Vampires comic: Dames	Las Vegas, 1930s
A noirish tale in which a gambling vampire meets his match while scouting casinos.
Angel comic: Spike vs Dracula (Part II)	Hollywood, 1930s
Bela Lugosi gives a live performance whilst a feud between Spike and Dracula ensues.
Buffy comic: Spike & Dru: "All's Fair"	Chicago, 1933
Spike and Dru are at the World's Fair.
Tales of the Vampires comic: Dust Bowl	USA, 1933
Young Joe Cooper trying to work a barren field that rain hasn't touched.
Tales of the Slayers comic: Broken Bottle of Djinn, 1937 (second half)	New York, 1937
A poor Slayer named Rachel O'Connor must deal with a powerful spirit.
Tales of the Slayers comic: Sonnenblume	Germany, 1938
A young WWII-era German Slayer, Anni Sonnenblume, learns who the true monsters are.
Angel comic: Spike vs Dracula (Part III)	World War II
Darla has been made a prisoner of the Third Reich.
Tales of the Vampires comic: Spot the Vampire	New York, 1950s
A vampire is amongst the people in a 1950s-looking department store.
Angel comic: Spike vs Dracula (Part IV)	Italy, 1950s
Spike discovers Drusilla is being charmed away from him by a mysterious other.
Buffy comic: Nikki Goes Down!	New York City, 1970s
Nikki Wood sets out to avenge the death of her cop boyfriend on the mean streets of 1970s New York.

=== Buffy season 1 ===
These Buffyverse tales take place around Buffy Season 1 (from spring 1996 up until spring 1997).

Buffyverse stories	Location, time (if known)
Buffy comic: The Origin	Los Angeles, summer 1996
Buffy is called whilst a student in L.A.
Buffy comic: Viva Las Buffy!	Los Angeles/Las Vegas, summer 1996
Buffy runs away to Las Vegas with Pike.
Buffy comic: Dawn & The Hoopy Bear	Los Angeles, summer 1996
A mysterious package is accidentally delivered to Dawn.
Buffy comic: Slayer, Interrupted	Los Angeles, summer 1996
Buffy battles sanity in an institution.
Buffy comic: Angels We Have Seen on High	Los Angeles, summer 1996
Before Buffy arrives in Sunnydale, Dawn meets with Angel for the first time.
Buffy comic: A Stake to the Heart	Los Angeles, summer 1996
Before Buffy arrives in Sunnydale, Dawn meets with Angel for the first time.
Buffy episode: S1E1: Welcome to the Hellmouth	Sunnydale, 1997
Buffy’s 1st day at Sunnydale high.
Buffy episode: S1E2: The Harvest	Sunnydale, 1997
The Master plans are revealed.
Buffy novel: The Harvest	Sunnydale, 1997
Novel adaptation of Welcome to the Hellmouth and The Harvest.
Buffy comic: The High School Years: Freaks & Geeks	Sunnydale, 1997. Between “The Harvest” and “Angel”.
Buffy faces a group of nerdy vampires.
Buffy episode: S1E3: Witch	Sunnydale, 1997
A witch may be working against the Cheerleading squad.
Buffy comic: The High School Years: Glutton for Punishment	Sunnydale, 1997. Between “The Harvest” and “Angel”.
Buffy faces a tiger demon.
Buffy episode: S1E4: Teacher’s Pet	Sunnydale, 1997
A biology substitute teacher may be more than what it seems.
Buffy novel: The Xander Years Vol. 1: Teacher’s Pet	Sunnydale, 1997
Novelization of the episode.
Buffy novel: Halloween Rain	Sunnydale, 1997
Buffy battles Samhain, the Pumpkin King, revived by a magical rain.
Buffy novel: Night of the Living Rerun	Sunnydale, 1997
Spirits from old Salem, Massachusetts, inhabit the bodies of Buffy and her friends, attempting a ritual to raise The Master.
Buffy comic: The High School Years: Parental Parasite	Sunnydale, 1997. Between “The Harvest” and “Angel”.
Buffy struggles to deal with her mom.
Buffy episode: S1E5: Never Kill a Boy on the First Date	Sunnydale, 1997
Buffy meets a new boy while dealing with a dangerous prophecy.
Buffy comic: The High School Years: No Need to Fear, the Slayer’s Here	Sunnydale, 1997. Between “The Harvest” and “Angel”.
Buffy struggles with her Slayer duties.
Buffy comic: Dead Love	Sunnydale, 1997
Buffy reads a story on one of Giles' journal about a man who has lost his wife in a car accident.
Buffy comic: MacGUFFINS	Sunnydale, 1997
Can Buffy pass the test of the MacGuffins?

=== Buffy season 2 ===
These tales take place during Buffy Season 2 (from autumn 1997 up until spring 1998).

Buffyverse stories	Location, time (if known)
Tales of the Slayers comic: Broken Bottle of Djinn, 1997 (first half)	Sunnydale, 1997
A powerful spirit is released from a locker at Sunnydale High. Buffy and Willow end up transporting it back to 1937.
Tales of the Vampires comic: The Problem with Vampires	Prag, 1997
Spike and Drusilla leave Prague amongst chaos.
Buffy comic: Spike & Dru: "The Queen of Hearts"	St. Louis, 1997
Spike and Dru are travelling to Sunnydale, but first stop off at St. Louis.
Buffy comic: Ring of Fire	Sunnydale, 1998
The armor of a samurai demon is taken from a cargo ship, as a fight begins for master of the 'ring of fire'. Giles continues to try to cope without Jenny, and Kendra visits.
Buffy comic: Spike & Dru: "Paint the Town Red"	Sunnydale, spring 1998
Spike is irritated by Drusilla's passion for Angelus. Their relationship comes to a heated end.

=== Buffy season 3 ===
These tales take place during Buffy Season 3 (from autumn 1998 up until spring 1999).

Buffyverse stories	Location, time (if known)
Buffy comic: Dust Waltz	Sunnydale, 1998
Two mysterious sisters, Lilith and Lamia, arrive in Sunnydale.
Buffy comic: Play With Fire	Sunnydale, 1998
A fight involving Xander's at school is broken up by a huge scorpion. A new range of dolls turn out to be demonic.
Buffy comic: Spike & Dru: "Who Made Who?"	Sunnydale, 1998
Spike and Dru are a newly made up couple in Brazil.
Buffy comic: Remaining Sunlight	Sunnydale, 1998
It's holiday season for Buffy.
Tales of the Vampires comic: Numb (During Amends)	Sunnydale, Christmas, 1998
Angel tries to control his evil side.
Buffy comic: Uninvited Guests	Sunnydale, 1999
Buffy battles Puritans, ice imps, hellhounds, and a demon.
Buffy comic: The Final Cut	Sunnydale, 1999
A film crew arrives at Sunnydale to film a horror movie about vampires.
Buffy comic: Bad Blood	Sunnydale, 1999
Buffy and the vampire Selke consider the importance of 'looks'.
Buffy/Angel crossover comic: Food Chain	Sunnydale, 1999
Buffy deals with High school delinquents, out of control crazes, and other obstacles.
Buffy comic: Crash Test Demons	Sunnydale, 1999
Buffy balances driving and slaying.
Buffy comic: Pale Reflections	Sunnydale, 1999
Buffy vs. the vampire, Selke.
Buffy/Angel crossover comic: Angel: The Hollower	Sunnydale, 1999
Angel faces an old enemy who hollows out vampires.
Buffy comic: Double Cross	Sunnydale, spring, 1999
As Angel drives to L.A. demonic forces hope to exploit the separation of Buffy and Angel.

=== Buffy season 4 / Angel season 1 ===
These Buffyverse tales take place during Buffy Season 4, and Angel Season 1 (from autumn 1999 up until spring 2000).

Buffyverse stories	Location, time (if known)
Angel comic: Doyle: Spotlight	L.A., 1999
The Powers That Be decide to entrust Allan Francis Doyle, a troubled half-human, half-Brachen demon, with the task of receiving visions from them.
Buffy comic: Blood of Carthage	Sunnydale, 1999
Buffy slays Sunnydale's version of Bigfoot with far-reaching unexpected, and unwanted results.
Angel comic: Surrogates	L.A., 1999
Angel, Cordy and Doyle face a demonic fertility clinic.
Angel comic: Strange Bedfellows	L.A., 1999
Angel attempts to help a woman who is trapped in an abusive marriage.
Buffy comic: Oz	Sunnydale, 1999
Oz leaves Sunnydale in search of himself.
Angel çizgi roman: Earthly Possessions	L.A., 1999
Angel attempts to drive a demon out of a possessed lawyer.
Angel comic: Hunting Ground	L.A., 2000
A murderer is leaving corpses across L.A. sewers. Kate suspects Angel has been getting hungry.
Buffy çizgi roman: Giles: Beyond the Pale	Sunnydale, 2000
The Watcher, Michaela Tomasi, notifies Giles of the death of his former mentor, Archie Lassiter. Giles is drawn back to England.
Buffy comic: Jonathan: Codename Comrades	Sunnydale, 2000
Jonathan has just performed a spell making him the superstar of Sunnydale.
Buffy/Angel crossover comic: Past Lives	Sunnydale, L.A., 2000
A huntress is tracking demons in L.A. and leaves them alive to scare Angel. The Scooby Gang come to L.A.
Buffy comic: Out of the Woodwork	Sunnydale, 2000
Sunnydale becomes infested with creepy crawlies.
Angel comic: Strange Bedfellows: "Cordelia"	L.A., 2000
Cordelia and Dennis guard valuable demonic items stashed in Cordy's apartment.

=== Buffy season 5 / Angel season 2 ===
These Buffyverse tales take place during Buffy Season 5, and Angel Season 2 (from autumn 2000 up until spring 2001).

Buffyverse stories	Location, time (if known)
Buffy comic: Haunted	Sunnydale, 2000
Faith tells Angel a story that takes place immediately after she was put into a coma. It seems the ghost of Sunnydale's former Mayor, Richard Wilkins, wanted some revenge.
Buffy çizgi roman: False Memories	Sunnydale, 2000
Dawn goes missing. Her disappearance seems to be linked to the former Slayer Yuki Makumura.
Buffy comic: Willow & Tara: Wannablessedbe	Sunnydale, 2000
The envy of a girl toward Willow and Tara's relationship becomes dangerous.
Angel comic: Long Night's Journey	L.A., 2000
Angel is looking for a kidnapped child and stumbles upon huge powerful forces of evil. He must fight some of the most threatening monsters around.
Buffy comic: Autumnal	Sunnydale, 2000
Buffy needs the help of a long-dead slayer to conquer a something hunting her down.
Angel comic: Autumnal	L.A., 2000
Angel looks in an abandoned amusement park to find and rescue a young girl from a gang of kidnappers.
Buffy comic: Willow & Tara: Demonology Menagerie	Sunnydale, 2000
One night, while Tara and Willow were studying magic, Willow took Dawn's game boy and accidentally get the monsters inside to reality.
Buffy comic: Ugly Little Monsters	Sunnydale, 2001
Scoobies battle small smelly green creatures.
Buffy comic: Death of Buffy: "Lost & Found"	Sunnydale, 2001
The Scoobie's emotional states have been unbalanced and a demon begins feeding from those emotions.
Buffy comic: Death of Buffy	Sunnydale, 2001
Willow takes lead but soon Sunnydale is under attack from disgruntled lizard-demons.

=== Buffy season 6 / Angel season 3 ===
These Buffyverse tales take place around Buffy Season 6, and Angel Season 3 (from autumn 2001 up until spring 2002).

Buffyverse stories	Location, time (if known)
Buffy comic: Reunion	Sunnydale, 2001
Xander, Anya and Dawn imagine what happened when Buffy and Angel met up.
Buffy comic: Willow & Tara: Wilderness	Sunnydale, 2001
Willow, Tara, and Dawn become involved in mystery after coming across a plot of cursed earth near the Pacific Coast Highway.
Buffy comic: Creatures of Habit	Sunnydale, 2001
A new clubbing experience is emerging in Sunnydale. DJs are mixing up music, drugs, and blood.
Buffy comic: Death of Buffy: "Withdrawal"	Sunnydale, 2001
Buffy's has returned from the grave but the D.J. vampire Velatti has also returned and seeks revenge.
Buffy comic: Chaos Bleeds	Sunnydale, 2001-2002
The walls between reality are 'bleeding' into each other as people from Buffy's past descend onto a chaotic Sunnydale.
Angel comic: Spike: Old Times	L.A., 2002
Spike bumps into Halfrek by chance in L.A.
Buffy comic: Rock 'N' Roll All Night (and Sleep Every Day)	Sunnydale, 2002
Spike and Dawn bump into an old enemy of Spike's.
Buffy comic: Note from the Underground	Sunnydale, Spring 2002
Angel breaks Faith out of jail and the two of them travel to Sunnydale to help control chaos there.

=== Buffy season 7 / Angel season 4 ===
These Buffyverse tales take place around Buffy Season 7, and Angel Season 4 (from autumn 2002 up until spring 2003).

Buffyverse stories	Location, time (if known)
Angel comic: Spike: Into the Light	USA, 2002
A young teenage vampire named Stacy explains how, while human, she was enchanted by the idea of magic.
Tales of the Vampires comic: Stacy	USA, 2002
A young teenage vampire named Stacy explains how, while human, she was enchanted by the idea of magic.
Tales of the Vampires comic: Taking Care of Business	USA, 2002
A vampire from the 15th century was formerly an inquisitor has gone mad.

=== Angel Season 5 ===
These Buffyverse tales take place around Angel Season 5 (from spring 2003 up until spring 2004).

Buffyverse stories	Location, time (if known)
Tales of the Vampires comic: Antique	Europe, 2003
Vlad Dracula has entranced Xander.
Angel comic: Smile Time	L.A., 2003
A puppet show suspected of killing children.
Angel comic: Masks	L.A., 2003
4 Halloween themed stories.
Angel comic: Spike vs Dracula (Part V)	L.A., 2003
Dracula arrives at the Wolfram and Hart branch at Los Angeles and is surprised to meet a non-corporeal Spike.
Angel comic: Wesley: Spotlight	L.A., 2003-2004
Wesley must make a decision regarding his affections for Fred and deal with any ramifications.
Angel comic: Spike: Old Wounds	L.A., 2003
Spike is the subject of an investigation.
Angel comic: Spike: Lost and Found	L.A., 2003-2004
A vampire is preying on citizens of L.A. in broad daylight.
Angel comic: Spike: Asylum	Sometime between 2003 and 2004. After Spike being corporeal again but before the fall.
Spike battles for sanity.
Angel comic: Gunn: Spotlight	L.A., 2003-2004
Gunn's naive cousin ends up in L.A. having run away from his home in Ohio.
Angel comic: A Hole in the World	L.A., 2003-2004
Fred is infected by a tomb device.
Angel comic: Spike: Shadow Puppets	Japan, 2003–2004.
Spike and Lorne go to Japan to investigate puppets.
Angel comic: Illyria: Spotlight	L.A., 2003-2004
Illyria tries to further understand humanity by studying the vessel whom it now occupies.
Angel comic: Connor: Spotlight	2004
Connor faces up to his conflicting memories.
Fallen Angel comic: Fallen Angel: Reborn	2004
Illyria seeks to regain her former glory.
Angel comic: Angel: Not Fade Away	2004
Last episode of Angel's 5th season

=== Buffy Season Eight / Angel: After the Fall ===
These Buffyverse tales take place after Angel Season 5.

Note: canon = bold, non-canon = italic

Buffyverse stories	Location, time (if known)
Angel comic: After The Fall Vol. 2: First Night	L.A., 2004
The incident that ended the Angel television series with such a shocking cliffhanger.
Angel comic: Spike: After the Fall	L.A., 2004
Spike first months in hell.
Angel comic: After The Fall Vol. 1	L.A., 2004
Set to some months after the incident that ended the Angel television series with such a shocking cliffhanger.
Angel comic: After The Fall Vol. 3	L.A., 2004
Gunn masterplan gets exposed.
Angel comic: After The Fall Vol. 4	L.A., 2004
A climactic battle will see Angel live free or die for the final time!
Angel comic: After The Fall Vol. 5: Aftermath	L.A., 2004
2 weeks after the finale of "After the Fall".
Angel comic: After The Fall Vol. 6: Last Angel in Hell	L.A., 2004
Stories about Gunn, Illyria, Dru and Angel.
Angel comic: Only Human	L.A., 2004
It continues the Gunn and Illyria story.
Angel comic: Angel: Immortality for Dummies – Volume One	L.A., 2004
When Angel goes missing, Connor steps in.
Angel comic: Spike: The Devil You Know	L.A., 2004
Spike gets in trouble over a girl (of course) and finds himself in the middle of a conspiracy.
Angel comic: The Crown Prince Syndrome – Volume Two	L.A., 2004
Now that Angel's back in charge, he struggles to keep his relationship with Connor.
Angel comic: Lorne: The Music of the Spheres	L.A., 2004. Before Cat’s in the Cradle.
Illyria is confronted by a creature who identifies itself as Discord.
Angel comic: Illyria: Haunted	L.A., 2004
Stories about Illyria.
Angel comic: The Wolf, the Ram, and the Heart – Volume Three	L.A., 2004
epic, bittersweet, last stand to save the city Angel loves.
Angel comic: Spike, Volume 1: Alone Together Now	Las Vegas, 2004
Spike heads out to the city of sin for a special mission.
Angel comic:Spike, Volume 2: Stranger Things	Las Vegas, 2004
Spike faces a crazed killer, the full power of Wolfram & Hart, and the challenges of having a soul and a demonic ex.
Angel comic: The Curse	Romania, 2004
Angel tries to remove his curse.
Angel comic: Old Friends	L.A., 2004
Angel returns to L.A. and meets old friends and foes.
Angel comic: Auld Lang Syne	2004-2005
Angel has returned to his work in Los Angeles, tracking down a mysterious cult and trying to solve a kidnapping. Trouble ensues when he bumps into familiar faces he wouldn't expect to.
Angel comic: Yearbook	Various
A collection of different stories.
Buffy comic: Willow: "Goddesses and Monsters"	2004-2005
Willow Rosenberg has decided to go on a traditional trip which most witches do.
Buffy Season Eight comic: The Long Way Home	Scotland, Italy, Sunnydale ruins, elsewhere, late 2004, early 2005
A year and a half since the events of Chosen, and the Scoobies - now branded terrorists, have greatly expanded their operations.
Buffy Season Eight comic: The Chain	Late 2004, early 2005
The first standalone comic in which tells the story of one of Buffy's decoys.
Buffy Season Eight comic: No Future for You	England, Cleveland, late 2004, early 2005
Giles recruits Faith for a mission relating to a rogue Slayer.
Buffy Season Eight comic: Anywhere but Here	Scotland, late 2004, early 2005
Buffy and Willow meet a demon who reveals a dim future, forcing the two to reflect on their past.
Buffy Season Eight comic: A Beautiful Sunset	Scotland, late 2004, early 2005
Buffy comes face to face with the new Big Bad
Buffy Season Eight comic: Wolves at the Gate	Scotland, Japan, late 2004, early 2005
Buffy's scythe is stolen by Japanese shape shifting vampires and the Scooby Gang teams up with Dracula to get it back.
Buffy Season Eight comic: Time of Your Life	Scotland, New York, 2005 / New York, 23rd century
Buffy is shanghaied to Fray's time to fight magical enemies.
Buffy Season Eight comic: Predators and Prey	Scotland, California, 2005
Buffy's former classmate Harmony lands her own reality TV show.
Tales of the Vampires comic: The Thrill	2005
Jacob craves the high and the easy escape from the monotony of his life that this "bloodletting" provides.
Tales of the Vampires comic: Carpe Noctem	2005
After vampires are exposed to the public, Cyn becomes extremely frustrated with the rules.
Buffy Season Eight comic: Retreat	Tibet, 2005
Upon arriving in Tibet, the group is filled in on what has happened to Oz since season 4 when he departed Sunnydale.
Buffy Season Eight comic: Turbulence	Tibet, 2005
It concludes the Tibet Story.
Buffy Season comic: Riley: Commitment Through Distance, Virtue Through Sin	2005
Riley and Sam are planning to settle down in Iowa. They take down more than half of Riley's parents' farm.
Buffy Season Eight comic: Twilight	2005
Aftermath of battle with Twilight's army.
Buffy Season Eight comic: Last Gleaming	2005
Buffy attempts to destroy the source of all magic in order to defeat the apocalypse waged by Twilight.
Buffy Season Eight comic: Magical Mystery Tour	2005, before Last Gleaming’s final part
Spike’s chasing a demon in space.

=== Buffy Season Nine / Angel & Faith ===
After season 8.

Buffyverse stories	Location, time (if known)
Angel & Faith comic: Live Through This	2006
Angel tries to make amends after killing Giles.
Buffy Season Nine comic: Freefall	2006
Buffy is a twenty-something waitress with no real direction.
Angel & Faith comic: Daddy Issues	2006
A mysterious mother superior seems to make people mad.
Buffy Season Nine comic: On Your Own	2006
Buffy is on her own.
Angel & Faith comic: Family Reunion	2006
Angel & son team up to save the world.
Buffy Season Nine comic: Willow Wonderland	2006
Armed with Buffy's broken scythe, Willow has entered another dimension and begun a quest to somehow, someway, against all odds, bring magic back to Earth.
Buffy Season Nine comic: Guarded	2006
Buffy becomes a bodyguard.
Spike comic: A Dark Place	2006
After Buffy rejected Spike's offer to join him on his ship, Spike felt depressed, having the bugs take his ship to the moon. There the ship was hijacked by nefarious demons.
Angel & Faith comic: Death & Consequences	2006
A demon from Giles' past emerges in London.

== Comics by writer ==
(w/) = Collaboration with another writer (or other writers).

- Amber Benson – The Innocent, Willow & Tara (w/)
- Chris Boal – Autumnal (w/)
- Dan Brereton – Dust Waltz, Uninvited Guests (w/)
- Chynna Clugston-Major – Food Chain (w/)
- Peter David – Spike: Old Times, Illyria: Spotlight, Spike vs Dracula
- Ben Edlund – Taking Care of Business
- Jane Espenson – Presumption, Broken Bottle of Djinn, 1997, Father, Dust Bowl, Spot the Vampire, Jonathan, Haunted, Reunion
- Jay Faerber – Connor: Spotlight
- Tom Fassbender – Out of the Woodwork (w/), Food Chain (w/), Ugly Little Monsters (w/), Autumnal (w/), False Memories (w/), Death of Buffy (w/), Creatures of Habit (w/)
- David Fury – The Glittering World
- Drew Goddard – The Problem with Vampires, Antique
- Christopher Golden – Earthly Possessions (w/), Strange Bedfellows, Hunting Ground (w/), Strange Bedfellows (w/), Past Lives (w/), Willow & Tara (w/), Oz, Giles (w/), Spike & Dru (w/), The Origin, Blood of Carthage, Food Chain (w/), , Play With Fire, Angel: The Hollower, Chaos Bleeds comic prequel (w/)
- Dan Jolley – Gunn: Spotlight
- Rebecca Rand Kirshner – Sonnenblume
- Paul Lee – Hoopy the Bear
- Scott Lobdell – Note from the Underground, Viva Las Buffy (w/), Slayer Interrupted (w/)
- Sam Loeb – Some Like it Hot
- Brian Lynch – Spike: Asylum
- Jeff Mariotte – The Curse, Old Friends, Doyle: Spotlight
- James Marsters – Spike & Dru (w/)
- Brett Matthews – Jack, Dames, Numb
- Fabian Nicieza – Death of Buffy (w/), Viva Las Buffy (w/), Slayer Interrupted (w/), A Stake to the Heart
- Jim Pascoe – Out of the Woodwork (w/), Food Chain (w/), Ugly Little Monsters (w/), Autumnal (w/), False Memories (w/), Death of Buffy (w/), Creatures of Habit (w/)
- Doug Petrie – Broken Bottle of Djinn, 1937, Ring of Fire, Double Cross, Bad Dog
- Jamie S. Rich – Food Chain (w/)
- Thomas E. Sniegoski – Earthly Possessions (w/), Strange Bedfellows (w/), Hunting Ground (w/), Past Lives (w/), Giles (w/), Chaos Bleeds comic prequel (w/)
- Scott Tipton – Spike: Old Wounds, Spike: Lost and Found, Wesley: Spotlight
- Andi Watson – Remaining Sunlight, Uninvited Guests (w/), The Final Cut, Bad Blood, Crash Test Demons, Pale Reflections
- Joss Whedon – Prologue, Righteous, Tales, Tales of the Vampires, Stacey, Long Night's Journey, Fray
