= Don DeBrandt =

Canadian author

Don DeBrandt is a Canadian science fiction author, who also writes under the pen-names Donn Cortez, DD Barant and Dixie Lyle. Born in Saskatchewan, he lives in Vancouver, British Columbia. In addition to North America, his books have been published in Germany, France, Italy, and Russia. His influences include Spider Robinson and John D. MacDonald, among others.

== Writing as Don DeBrandt ==
As DeBrandt, he has written numerous essays, short stories, plays and comics. His first novel, the cyberpunk The Quicksilver Screen was part of Del Rey Books' 'Discovery' line, and featured a cover by science fiction painter Vincent Di Fate. This was followed by work for Marvel Comics and a novel in the series of book tie-ins for the Angel TV series.

== Writing as Donn Cortez ==
As Donn Cortez, he took a darker turn for The Closer, a hard-edged story about a serial killer hunting other serial killers. His follow-up, The Man Burns Tonight (set at Burning Man) was written in his more light-hearted style.

He has also contributed several short stories and non-fiction articles to numerous publications, writing on such diverse subjects as Angel, Firefly, The Golden Compass, The Hitchhiker's Guide to the Galaxy, CSI: Miami, King Kong, X-Men, Wonder Woman, Star Wars, and Star Trek.

Beginning in 2005, Cortez was contracted to write the tie-in novels for both the original CSI series, and its spin-off CSI: Miami. The final volume in his run, Dark Sundays, was released in early 2010.

A sequel to The Closer, titled Remote was published in 2011.

== Writing as DD Barant ==
In 2009, DeBrandt began writing a series of supernatural crime procedurals, entitled The Bloodhound Files, using the pen name "DD Barant" to distinguish the lighter tone of the books from his work as Cortez. The first of three books, Dying Bites was released in July 2009, with sequels Death Blows and Killing Rocks released in 2010. Better Off Undead came out in 2011, and Back From The Undead in 2012.

== Writing as Dixie Lyle ==
The spring of 2014 saw the beginning of a new series of books written under the pseudonym of Dixie Lyle. The Whiskey, Tango & Foxtrot series, beginning with A Taste Fur Murder are part of what is known as Cozy mysteries, in which pets and their owners solve crimes.

The Whiskey, Tango & Foxtrot series deals with one Deirdre 'Foxtrot' Lancaster, personal assistant to a wealthy entrepreneur, who is reunited with her reincarnated cat Tango, now able to communicate with her telepathically. Together with an ectoplasmic, shape-shifting dog named Whiskey they set out to keep Foxtrot's boss out of trouble. The series is more light-hearted in tone, with imaginative plotting and characters. A second book, To Die Fur was released later in 2014, and as of 2020 four books in total have been published with a fifth title forthcoming.

== Bibliography ==
- The Quicksilver Screen (1992)
- Steeldriver (1998)
- Timberjak (1999)
- V.I. (2000)
- Angel: Shakedown (2000)

=== Writing as Donn Cortez ===
- The Closer (2004)
- The Man Burns Tonight (2005)
- CSI: Miami: Cult Following (2005)
- CSI: Miami: Riptide (2006)
- Investigating CSI (2006) (as editor)
- CSI: Miami: Harm for the Holidays: Misgivings (2006)
- CSI: Miami: Harm for the Holidays: Heart Attack (2007)
- CSI: Miami: Cut and Run (2008)
- CSI: Killing Jar (2009)
- CSI: Dark Sundays (2010)
- Remote (2011)

=== Writing as DD Barant ===
- The Bloodhound Files: Dying Bites (2009)
- The Bloodhound Files: Death Blows (2010)
- The Bloodhound Files: Killing Rocks (2010)
- The Bloodhound Files: Better Off Undead (October 2011)
- The Bloodhound Files: Back From The Undead (2012)
- The Bloodhound Files: Undead to the World (2012)

=== Writing as Dixie Lyle ===
- A Taste Fur Murder (2014)
- To Die Fur (2014)
- Marked Fur Murder (2015)
- A Deadly Tail (2016)
- Purrfectly Dead (forthcoming)
