= List of Buffy the Vampire Slayer novels =

The Lost Slayer is an example of the dozens of novels taking place in the fictional Buffyverse. In this story, Buffy enters an alternate reality that makes her life seem sugar-coated.

Buffy the Vampire Slayer novels have been published since 1997. Originally under the Pocket Books imprint of Simon & Schuster, many titles were published by Simon Spotlight Entertainment since its launch in 2004. Various authors have written original novels for the series, including Mel Odom, Christopher Golden, and Nancy Holder.

After Disney Entertainment acquired Buffy's parent company 20th Century Studios in 2019, the publishing license is currently under Disney's Hyperion Avenue Books, which has published new Buffy novels since 2022.

== Chronology ==
=== Novelizations ===
These Buffyverse tales take place throughout the series and are novelizations of various episodes.

Title	Novelization by	First published	ISBN-13
Buffy the Vampire Slayer	Richie Tankersley Cusick	August 1992	978-0671792206
Buffy the Vampire Slayer	Novelization of the movie		
The Harvest	Richie Tankersley Cusick	September 1997	978-0671017125
The Harvest	'Welcome to the Hellmouth' and 'The Harvest'		
The Angel Chronicles, Vol. 1	Nancy Holder	July 1998	978-0-671-02133-7
The Angel Chronicles, Vol. 1	'Angel,' 'Reptile Boy,' and 'Lie to Me'		
The Angel Chronicles, Vol. 2	Richie Tankersley Cusick	December 1998	978-0-671-02627-1
The Angel Chronicles, Vol. 2	'Halloween,' 'What's My Line? Part 1,' and 'What's My Line? Part 2'		
The Angel Chronicles, Vol. 3	Nancy Holder	1999	978-0671026318
The Angel Chronicles, Vol. 3	'Surprise,' 'Innocence,' and 'Passion'		
The Xander Years, Vol. 1	Keith DeCandido	1999	978-0671026295
The Xander Years, Vol. 1	'Teacher's Pet,' 'Inca Mummy Girl,' and 'Bewitched, Bothered & Bewildered'		
The Xander Years, Vol. 2	Jeff Mariotte	2000	978-0671039202
The Xander Years, Vol. 2	'The Pack,' 'Go Fish,' and 'The Zeppo'		
The Willow Files, Vol. 1	Yvonne Navarro	December 1999	978-0671039189
The Willow Files, Vol. 1	'I Robot, You Jane,' 'Phases,' and 'Dead Man's Party'		
The Willow Files, Vol. 2	Yvonne Navarro	2001	978-0743400435
The Willow Files, Vol. 2	'Gingerbread,' 'Doppelgangland' and 'Choices'		
The Faith Trials	James Laurence	April 2001	978-0743400442
The Faith Trials	'Faith, Hope, & Trick,' 'Revelatins,' 'Bad Girls,' and 'Consequences'		
The Journals of Rupert Giles	Nancy Holder	February 2002	978-0743427128
The Journals of Rupert Giles	'Helpless,' 'A New Man,' and 'Blood Ties'		
The Cordelia Collection	Nancy Krulik	December 2002	978-0743427463
The Cordelia Collection	'Out of Mind, Out of Sight,' 'Some Assembly Required,' and 'Homecoming'		
Chosen	Nancy Holder	June 2003	978-0689866258
Chosen	Buffy the Vampire Slayer season 7		

=== 490 BCE to 1996 CE ===
These Buffyverse tales take place before the television series begins (from 490 BCE to 1996 CE).

Title	Setting	Author	First published	ISBN-13
Tales of the Slayer, volume 1	Various	Various	October 2001	978-0743400459
Tales of the Slayer, volume 2	Various	Various	December 2002	978-0743427449
Tales of the Slayer, volume 3	Various	Various	November 2003	978-0689864360
Tales of the Slayer, volume 4	Various	Various	November 2004	978-0689869556
Spike and Dru: Pretty Maids All in a Row	1940s Europe	Christopher Golden	May 2001	978-0-7434-1892-8
Spike and Dru: Pretty Maids All in a Row	It is 1940 and for Drusilla's vampiric birthday, Spike decides he will acquire Freyja's Strand, a necklace that has the ability to allow Drusilla to view her reflection.			
Blackout	New York, 1977	Keith R.A. DeCandido	August 2006	978-1-4169-1917-9
Blackout	Spike and Dru come to NYC during a blackout and face Nikki Wood.			

=== Buffy season 1 ===
These Buffyverse tales take place around Buffy season 1 (from spring 1996 until spring 1997).

Title	Setting	Author	First published	ISBN-13
Halloween Rain	Sunnydale, Halloween 1996	Christopher Golden and Nancy Holder	November 1997	978-0-671-01713-2
Halloween Rain	Buffy is warned that a scarecrow will come alive on Halloween if it's raining.			
Night of the Living Rerun	Sunnydale, 1996/7	Arthur Byron Cover	March 1998	978-0-671-01715-6
Night of the Living Rerun	The Master attempts to raise an old Slayer nemesis.			
Coyote Moon	Sunnydale, summer 1997	John Vornholt	January 1998	978-0-671-01714-9
Coyote Moon	It's summer vacation in Sunnydale and the carnival has come to town, bringing with it some disturbing otherworldly creatures.			
How I Survived My Summer Vacation	Sunnydale, & L.A., summer 1997	Various	August 2000	978-0-613-63300-0
How I Survived My Summer Vacation	Buffy visits her Dad in L.A. whilst the others continue the good fight.			

=== Buffy season 2 ===
The Suicide King, Keep Me In Mind, Colony, and Night Terrors form a series of gamebooks, titled Stake Your Destiny. Each novel contains many numbered sections. Instead of reading the book from start-to-finish, the reader is given a choice at the end of each section. Depending upon the reader's decision, the reader will be directed to another numbered section that might be anywhere in the book. Unlike some other gamebooks, Stake Your Destiny novels do not contain any form of game system.

These tales take place during Buffy season 2 (from autumn 1997 until spring 1998).

Title	Setting	Author	First published	ISBN-13
The Suicide King	Sunnydale, 1997	Robert Joseph Levy	February 2005	978-1-4165-0242-5
The Suicide King	A number of strange student suicides have been taking place, and Buffy suspects something wrong.			
Keep Me In Mind	Sunnydale, 1997	Nancy Holder	April 2005	978-1-4165-0241-8
Keep Me In Mind	Ethan Rayne returns and releases an evil sorcerer from Middle Ages Bavaria.			
Colony	Sunnydale, 1997	Laura J. Burns and Melinda Metz	September 2005	978-1-4169-0057-3
Colony	Mayor Richard Wilkins III invited a woman named Belakane to speak at the local Sunnydale High School. She has a program, "Be the Ultimate You!".			
Night Terrors	Sunnydale, 1997	Alice Henderson	December 2005	978-1-4165-1146-5
Night Terrors	The Night Terror stalks its victims in their dreams. The demon replaces another's soul with its own, then wreaks chaos in the real world.			
Afterimage	Sunnydale, 1997	Pierce Askegren	January 2006	978-1-4169-1181-4
Afterimage	Sunnydale drive-in reopens.			
Carnival of Souls	Sunnydale, 1997	Nancy Holder	April 2006	978-1-4169-1182-1
Carnival of Souls	A Traveling Carnival arrives in Sunnydale. It seems the carnival might be another victim of Sunnydale's weirdness.			
Go Ask Malice: A Slayer's Diary	Boston, December 1997 - June 1998	Robert Joseph Levy	June 2006	978-1-4169-1587-4
Go Ask Malice: A Slayer's Diary	Faith has a tough time growing up in South Boston, moving from relative to relative when Diana Dormer arrives and informs Faith that she is a potential slayer.			
Portal Through Time	Sunnydale, 1998	Alice Henderson	October 2006	978-1-4169-1918-6
Portal Through Time	Some of the Master's devotees travel through time to attempt to disrupt the Slayer lineage, thus preventing Buffy from destroying the Master.			
Bad Bargain	Sunnydale, 1997	Diana G. Gallagher	December 2006	978-1-4169-1919-3
Bad Bargain	Items for the school rummage sale become infected with Hellmouth parasites after being stored in the school basement.			
One Thing or Your Mother	Sunnydale, 1997/8	Kirsten Beyer	March 2008	978-1-84739-120-9
One Thing or Your Mother	Buffy is having a hard time dealing with Angelus and her grades and so Snyder forces her to get tutoring which takes time away from her slaying, just when things couldn't get worse Dru wants a child and sires a little girl who starts to become too much to handle. Buffy's new love interest makes Angelus jealous and a sleep-deprivation spell aimed at Snyder affects the whole Sunnydale community.			

=== Buffy season 3 ===
These tales take place during Buffy season 3 (from autumn 1998 until spring 1999).

Title	Setting	Author	First published	ISBN-13
Sins of the Father	Sunnydale, 1998	Christopher Golden	November 1999	978-0-671-03928-8
Sins of the Father	Pike visits Sunnydale.			
Blooded	Sunnydale, 1998	Christopher Golden and Nancy Holder	August 1998	978-0-671-02134-4
Blooded	The Scoobies become entangled in a long-running feud between Asian warriors.			
Child of the Hunt	Sunnydale, 1998	Christopher Golden and Nancy Holder	October 1998	978-0-671-02135-1
Child of the Hunt	The 'Wild Hunt' arrives in Sunnydale.			
Ghoul Trouble	Sunnydale, 1998	John Passarella	October 2000	978-0-7434-0042-8
Ghoul Trouble	A new vampire arrives in town called Solitaire who is immune to the sun's rays.			
Paleo	Sunnydale, 1998	Yvonne Navarro	September 2000	978-0-7434-0034-3
Paleo	People try to resurrect dinosaur eggs.			
The Evil That Men Do	Sunnydale, 1998	Nancy Holder	July 2000	978-0-671-02635-6
The Evil That Men Do	Helen, an ancient vampire attempts to raise a goddess of destruction.			
The Deathless	Sunnydale, 1999	Keith R.A. DeCandido	April 2007	978-1-84739-037-0
The Deathless	Ring Day is fast approaching at Sunnydale High.			
Doomsday Deck	Sunnydale, 1999	Diana G. Gallagher	December 2000	978-0-7434-0041-1
Doomsday Deck	Tarot card-reader, Justine arrives in Sunnydale.			
Immortal	Sunnydale, 1999	Christopher Golden and Nancy Holder	October 1999	978-0-671-04117-5
Immortal	Buffy faces Veronique, a vampire even more immortal than most.			
Prime Evil	Sunnydale, spring, 1999	Diana G. Gallagher	March 2000	978-0-671-03930-1
Prime Evil	Crystal Gregory is a beautiful new teacher at Sunnydale High, who also happens to give Buffy panic fits.			
Revenant	Sunnydale, spring, 1999	Mel Odom	January 2001	978-0-7434-0035-0
Revenant	A Chinese gang arrives in Sunnydale.			
Power of Persuasion	Sunnydale, spring, 1999	Elizabeth Massie	October 1999	978-0-671-02632-5
Power of Persuasion	The Moon family try to create a "Womyn Power" group at school, meanwhile there is a string of unusual killings.			
Resurrecting Ravana	Sunnydale, spring, 1999	Ray Garton	January 2000	978-0-671-02636-3
Resurrecting Ravana	The Rakshasa are in town to help with the resurrection on an ancient Hindu god called Ravana.			
Out of the Madhouse (The Gatekeeper Trilogy book 1)	Sunnydale, spring, 1999	Christopher Golden with Nancy Holder	January 1999	978-0-671-02434-5
Out of the Madhouse (The Gatekeeper Trilogy book 1)	The Gatekeeper is frail and on the verge of death, yet must hold the walls of reality together in the face of increasing threat.			
Ghost Roads (The Gatekeeper Trilogy book 2)	Sunnydale, spring, 1999	Christopher Golden with Nancy Holder	March 1999	978-0-671-02749-0
Sons of Entropy (The Gatekeeper Trilogy book 3)	Sunnydale, spring, 1999	Christopher Golden with Nancy Holder	May 1999	978-0-671-02750-6
Return to Chaos	Sunnydale, spring, 1999	Craig Shaw Gardner	December 1998	978-0-671-02136-8
Return to Chaos	Four Druids arrive in town. They're in town to try a spell on a certain night to close the gateway in the Hellmouth so that demons would not be allowed to pass through.			
Visitors	Sunnydale, spring, 1999	Laura Anne Gilman and Josepha Sherman	April 1999	978-0-671-02628-8
Visitors	Buffy thinks she's being stalked by a demon with a high-pitched giggle.			
Unnatural Selection	Sunnydale, spring, 1999	Mel Odom	August 1999	978-0-671-02630-1
Unnatural Selection	Willow battles against the "faeries."			
Obsidian Fate	Sunnydale, spring, 1999	Diana G. Gallagher	September 1999	978-0-671-03929-5
Obsidian Fate	An old Spanish expedition is found on the outskirts of Sunnydale.			
Deep Water	Sunnydale, spring, 1999	Laura Anne Gilman and Josepha Sherman	February 2000	978-0-671-03919-6
Deep Water	After an oil spill on a nearby Sunnydale beach, Willow discovers a 'selkie'; that is, a girl that can turn into a seal with her sealskin.			
Here Be Monsters	Sunnydale, spring, 1999	Cameron Dokey	June 2000	978-0-671-03921-9
Here Be Monsters	After Buffy kills twin teenage vampires, their vampire mother summons a Goddess of balance who puts Buffy on a trial that could cost people's lives.			
The Book of Fours	Sunnydale, spring, 1999	Nancy Holder	April 2001	978-0-7434-1240-7
The Book of Fours	The power of four slayers is needed to conquer a new threat.			
Sunnydale High Yearbook	Sunnydale, spring, 1999	Christopher Golden and Nancy Holder	September 1999	978-0-671-03541-9
Sunnydale High Yearbook	Yearbook received by Scoobies when they graduated from high school.			

=== Buffy season 4/Angel season 1 ===
These Buffyverse tales take place during Buffy season 4 and Angel season 1 (from autumn 1999 until spring 2000).

Title	Author	Date published	ISBN-13
Prophecies (The Lost Slayer Part One)	Christopher Golden	2001	978-0-7434-1185-1
Dark Times (The Lost Slayer Part Two)	Christopher Golden	2001	978-0-7434-1186-8
King of the Dead (The Lost Slayer Part Three)	Christopher Golden	2001	978-0-7434-1187-5
Original Sins (The Lost Slayer Part Four)	Christopher Golden	2001	978-0-7434-1185-1
The Lost Slayer (Omnibus Edition)	Christopher Golden	2001	978-0-7434-1226-1
The Lost Slayer (Omnibus Edition)	The Lost Slayer series. Buffy, new to UC Sunnydale faces a group of vampires with bats tattooed across their faces who will have huge and not-so-appealing consequences for the Scooby Gang's future. Sunnydale, 1999.		
Oz: Into the Wild	Christopher Golden	May 2002	978-0-7434-0038-1
Oz: Into the Wild	Oz is in search of himself having left his home. Sunnydale, 1999.		
The Burning (Unseen book one)	Nancy Holder and Jeff Mariotte	May 2001	978-0-7434-1893-5
Door to Alternity (Unseen book two)	Nancy Holder and Jeff Mariotte	June 2001	978-0-7434-1894-2
Long Way Home (Unseen book three)	Nancy Holder and Jeff Mariotte	August 2001	978-0-7434-1895-9
Long Way Home (Unseen book three)	Unseen trilogy. Buffy and Angel have to work together to solve disappearances of teenagers and calm down the gang warfare going on in LA. Sunnydale, Los Angeles, 2000. Crossover book series with Angel.		

=== Buffy season 5/Angel season 2 ===
These Buffyverse tales take place during Buffy season 5 and Angel season 2 (from autumn 2000 until spring 2001).

Title	Setting	Author	First published	ISBN-13
These Our Actors	Sunnydale, 2000	Ashley McConnell and Dori Koogler	September 2002	978-0-7434-5034-8
These Our Actors	Willow takes up drama class, and Spike recalls Cecily.			
The Wisdom of War	Sunnydale, 2001	Christopher Golden	July 2002	978-0-7434-5033-1
The Wisdom of War	Two strange breeds of sea creatures are beginning to appear in Sunnydale.			
Tempted Champions	Sunnydale, 2001	Yvonne Navarro	March 2002	978-0-7434-5031-7
Tempted Champions	A deadly fighter arrives, willing to kill both humans and vampires.			
Little Things	Sunnydale, 2001	Rebecca Moesta	August 2002	978-0-7434-4982-3
Little Things	The town is terrorised by something mysterious and tiny.			
Crossings	Sunnydale, 2001	Mel Odom	June 2002	978-0-7434-2734-0
Crossings	Xander learns of a terrifying total immersion video game beta testing.			
Sweet Sixteen	Sunnydale, 2001	Scott Ciencin	April 2002	978-0-7434-2732-6
Sweet Sixteen	Dawn befriends a girl named Arianna.			
Chaos Bleeds	Sunnydale, 2001	James A. Moore	August 2003	978-0-7434-6821-3
Chaos Bleeds	The First has made Ethan a deal he can't refuse: ultimate power. All he has to do is lure Buffy into battle.			

=== Buffy season 6/Angel season 3 ===
These Buffyverse tales take place around Buffy season 6 and Angel season 3 (from autumn 2001 until spring 2002).

Title	Setting	Author	First published	ISBN-13
Cursed	L.A., 2001	Mel Odom	November 2003	978-0-689-86437-7
Cursed	An organised, united effort is being made to put Spike out of the picture. Angel and Spike reluctantly work together and deal with their shared evil pasts. Crossover book with Angel.			
Monster Island	Sunnydale, L.A., Monster Island, 2001	Christopher Golden and Thomas E. Sniegoski	March 2003	978-0-689-85665-5
Monster Island	Team Angel and the Scooby Gang must unite to protect a safe-haven of half-blood demons. Crossover book with Angel.			
Blood and Fog	England 1888, Sunnydale, 2002	Nancy Holder	May 2003	978-0-7434-0039-8
Blood and Fog	Buffy Summers is on the trail of a killer demon in Sunnydale, and reluctantly accepts the help of Spike. But Spike—as usual—has his own agenda.			
Wicked Willow #1: The Darkening	Sunnydale, 2002	Yvonne Navarro	May 2004	978-0-7434-2774-6
Wicked Willow #2: Shattered Twilight	Sunnydale, 2002	Yvonne Navarro	July 2004	978-0-689-86953-2
Wicked Willow #3: Broken Sunrise	Sunnydale, 2002	Yvonne Navarro	September 2004	978-0-689-86954-9
Wicked Willow Omnibus	Sunnydale, 2002	Yvonne Navarro	2004	
Wicked Willow Omnibus	Wicked Willow trilogy. Supposing that Dark Willow did not return to the good so quickly.			

=== Buffy season 7 /Angel season 4 ===
These Buffyverse tales take place around Buffy season 7 and Angel season 4 (from autumn 2002 until spring 2003).

Title	Setting	Author	First published	ISBN-13
Spark and Burn	Sunnydale, 2002	Diana G. Gallagher	July 2005	978-1-4165-0237-1
Spark and Burn	Spike remembers his past as he suffers insanity in a school basement.			
Apocalypse Memories	Sunnydale, 2002	Laura J. Burns with Melinda Metz	March 2004	978-0-689-86700-2
Apocalypse Memories	Willow is terrified that using her magic powers might result in dark magic consuming her whilst the Angel Michael brings signs of apocalypse to Sunnydale.			
Heat	Sunnydale, L.A., 2002	Nancy Holder	June 2004	978-0-689-86017-1
Heat	Buffy and Angel both battle the same ancient evil, a Possessor who was once "Qin". Crossover book with Angel.			
Seven Crows	Mexico, 2002	John Vornholt	July 2003	978-0-7434-6865-7
Seven Crows	Between Mexico and Arizona Riley and Sam Finn call in Buffy and Angel to investigate mysterious supernature. Crossover book with Angel.			
Mortal Fear	Sunnydale, 2002	Scott and Denise Ciencin	September 2003	978-0-7434-6867-1
Mortal Fear	Buffy is being sent on random missions by a man that goes by the name of Simon. He wants her to retrieve parts of a mystical sword and put them together, but he refuses to say why or who he even is.			

=== Buffy season 8 /Angel season 5 ===
These Buffyverse tales take place after Buffy season 7 and after Angel season 4.

Title	Setting	Author	First published	ISBN-13
Queen of the Slayers	Sunnydale, Cleveland, Italy, Summer 2003–2004	Nancy Holder	May 2005	978-1-4165-0240-1
Queen of the Slayers	Hundreds of potential slayers have been awakened. A number of leading dark figures unite in an attempt to retaliate against the new status quo.			
Dark Congress	2003–2004	Christopher Golden	August 2007	978-1-4169-3631-2
Dark Congress	Until 500 years ago all of the demonic and monstrous races met at a Dark Congress. They prepare to meet again.			

== Canonical issues ==
Buffy novels are not usually considered part of Buffyverse canon by fans. However, unlike fan fiction, overviews summarizing the basic story of each novel (written early in the writing process) were approved by both Fox and Joss Whedon (or his office), thereby allowing the books to be published as official Buffy/Angel merchandise.

== Novels by writer ==
For a list associating Buffyverse authors with their Buffyverse novels see here. List of authors who have written Buffy novels:

- Pierce Askegren
- Kirsten Beyer
- Laura J. Burns
- Denise Ciencin
- Scott Ciencin
- Arthur Byron Cover
- Keith R. A. DeCandido
- Cameron Dokey
- Diana G. Gallagher
- Craig Shaw Gardner
- Ray Garton
- Laura Anne Gilman
- Christopher Golden
- Christie Golden
- Alice Henderson
- Nancy Holder
- Robert Joseph Levy
- Ashley McConnell
- Elizabeth Massie
- Jeff Mariotte
- Melinda Metz
- Rebecca Moesta
- Yvonne Navarro
- Mel Odom
- John Passarella
- Paul Ruditis
- Josepha Sherman
- Thomas E. Sniegoski
- John Vornholt

== See also ==
- List of Buffyverse novels
- List of Angel novels
- List of television series made into books
