= Four Star Mary =

American alternative rock band

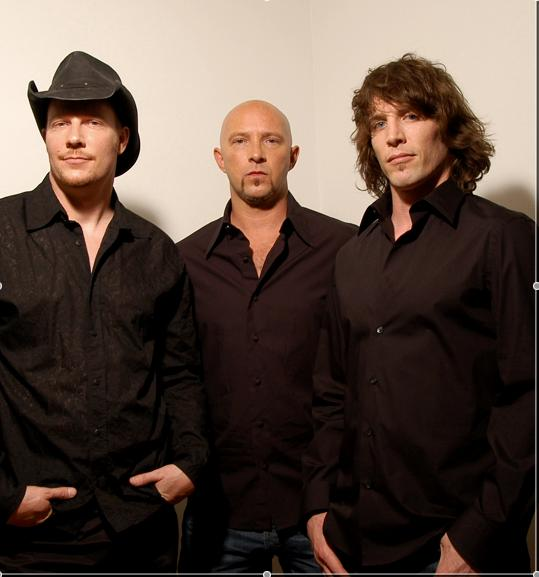
- Publicity photo by the band in 2007

Background information
- Also known as: Dingoes Ate My Baby (in Buffy)
- Origin: California, United States
- Genres: Alternative rock
- Years active: 1997-present
- Labels: Spitfire
- Members: Tad Looney; Michael ‘Zu’ Zufelt; Steve Carter; Chris Sobchack; Derrick Tanner
- Past members: "Michael Buddy" Chanda; Falon; Dave McClellan; Doug Granville; Scotty Kormos; Adam Kury
- Website: www.fourstarmary.com

Four Star Mary is an alternative rock group formed in California in 1997. The band named themselves after the Four Star vs. Mary legal case, in which Mary attempted to sue US oil company ExxonMobil.

== Appearance in Buffy the Vampire Slayer ==
Lead singer Tad Looney, guitarist Michael ‘Zu’ Zufelt, bassist Steve Carter, drummer Chris Sobchack and rhythm guitarist Derrick Tanner made up the fictitious band Dingoes Ate My Baby in which Oz (Seth Green) plays lead guitar in Seasons Two, Three and Four of Buffy the Vampire Slayer. They have also had tracks featured on the shows Party of Five, Road Rules, The Real World and Charmed.

According to an interview in The Watcher's Guide, music editor John King heard their music at a party hosted by Steve Carter's girlfriend and thought they would be good on the show. Joss Whedon decided that they had the right sound for the fictitious band he wanted. In Buffy, they played at several posting board and cast/crew parties.

Their 2001 single "Pain" is on the original soundtrack CD for the show.

== Discography ==
- Four Star Mary (EP), 1997
- Thrown to the Wolves (album), 1998
- "Marlene/Think" (double A-side single), 2000
- Thrown to the Wolves (album), 2001 (UK re-release)
- "Dilate" (single), 2001 (UK, spitfire records)
- "Pain" (single), 2001 (UK, spitfire records)
- Stripped
- Welcome Home (album), 2002
- Live And Unheard Of (EP), 2003 (Limited edition)
- "Rio" (single), 2004
- Hello It's Me (album), 2006
- Pieces pt. I (EP), 2016
