= Last Gleaming =

Final story arc of the Buffy the Vampire Slayer Season Eight series of comic books

- Cover of Buffy the Vampire Slayer Season Eight: Last Gleaming trade paperback collected edition Art by Jo Chen
- Publisher: Dark Horse Comics
- Publication date: September 2010 – January 2011
- Genre: Action/adventure, horror; Based on Buffy the Vampire Slayer; Vampire
- Title(s): Buffy the Vampire Slayer Season Eight #36–40
- Main character(s): Buffy Summers; Rupert Giles; Angel; Spike; Xander Harris; Willow Rosenberg; Dawn Summers; Faith Lehane

Creative team
- Writer(s): Joss Whedon; Scott Allie
- Penciller: Georges Jeanty
- Inker: Andy Owens
- Colorist: Michelle Madsen
- Editor: Scott Allie

With respect to the Buffy the Vampire Slayer franchise
- The material covered in this article is a continuity issue in the canon of Buffy the Vampire Slayer.

"Last Gleaming" is the eighth and final storyarc in the Buffy the Vampire Slayer Season Eight comic book series, which is based on the television show. The arc was written by Joss Whedon and Season Eight editor Scott Allie. The story follows Buffy's attempt to destroy the source of all magic in order to defeat the apocalypse waged by Twilight.

== Plot ==
Following the events of Twilight, Spike arrives with his crew to assist Buffy Summers' battle against Angel. He explains to her that the Twilight realm, created from Buffy and Angel's lovemaking, demands the Seed, the source of all magic found deep in the Hellmouth below the fallen Sunnydale. Angel is possessed by Twilight and tries to retrieve the Seed, while Earth is invaded by demons from other dimensions. The Scooby Gang believe the best course of action is to protect the Seed, as destroying the Seed or handing it over would return the demons to their respective dimensions but also rid the world of all magic. As Slayers engage in a mass battle, Buffy and a select few descend into the Hellmouth, where they find the Master guarding the Seed, a red, egg-shaped ball of energy. Willow confiscates the Seed from the Master and feels more powerful and more connected to the universe than ever; now able to destroy hordes of extra-dimensional demons above ground with ease.

Underground, Angel arrives and exchanges blows with Buffy. Observing the couple's fight from afar, Giles, realising that Buffy would never kill Angel and is allowing herself to get distracted from destroying the Seed, takes the Scythe from Faith and charges toward the Seed. Angel, seeing what Giles intends to do, snaps his neck. Horrified by the death of her mentor, Buffy grabs the Scythe and uses it to smash the Seed before collapsing to the ground in tears beside Giles, causing all magic on Earth to vanish. All of the world's witches, including Willow, find themselves completely powerless. Warren Mears, who had been kept alive by Amy's spell, dies once again. The invading demons are returned to their own dimensions and the Twilight realm is vanquished. Angel is freed from his possession and, suddenly conscious of what he has done, turns catatonic with grief.

Four months after the battle, Buffy is living a quiet and modest lifestyle in San Francisco and is staying at Dawn and Xander's apartment while waitressing by day and vampire slaying by night. The Slayers are viewed as social pariahs, for which they blame Buffy. Simone, in particular, wishes to kill her. Like other former witches, Willow is struggling with the loss of magic, and feeling powerless, ends her relationship with Kennedy. Finally, after inheriting Giles' estate, Faith takes Angel with her to bring him back on to the righteous path.

== Production ==
=== Writing ===
In this arc, Whedon sets up a number of new paradigms in the Buffy universe for the forthcoming Season Nine comic book series, the ongoing Angel and Faith spin-off series, and the Willow mini-series. Buffy destroying the seed effectively means "No more magic in the sense of not so much entirely convenient magic". According to Whedon, it was his choice to "dim" the world of the show "a little bit. Possibly because that’s how I feel about it, or at least this country in the last 10 years. And I wanted to do a little bit of a reset, where things seem more back down to earth." When Season Eight began, Whedon wanted to make full use of the comic book medium's potentials. For example, he introduced Giant Dawn, which he felt fit the universe's tone and "was the right kind of problem for Dawn to have". Ultimately however, Whedon felt that Buffy was less about the scope of its stories; he describes the show's "mission statement" as “What does this feel like?”, and therefore ultimately decided to take the series back to the "real world". Season Nine more closely resembled the television series, and dwelled as it did more on Buffy's interiority and less on the "cavalcade of mythology", as Season Eight did. The change also made Buffy an underdog again, and no longer an overlord; Whedon commented that fans typically prefer Buffy in that role. Willow's mini-series further explored Willow's destiny — first pondered in the Fray crossover arc "Time of Your Life" — amid her sole-minded crusade to retrieve her powers.

In a 2011 interview, Whedon stated that his decision to kill off Giles could not be discussed in detail "because ripples from that event" would also be a large part of both Season Nine and Angel and Faith. However, he was able to explain other motivations; he felt that from a writing perspective, Giles' did not work in the comic book medium where he had flourished on the television show. His primary roles — provider of narrative exposition, and paternal figure — didn't place well in the comic book format. Whedon killed off Giles where he did so that it could have a greater effect on the following season, "because [he] wanted to make all this matter".

On the penultimate page of issue forty, a panel shows the face of "a guy in John Lennon glasses who looks fairy evil". As Whedon had promised, the character was better explored in Season Nine. The final line, "Let's go to work", narrated by Buffy, mirrors the last line uttered in the Angel series finale. Co-writer Scott Allie explained in an interview that the line is the mission statement of both characters. However, he adds that Buffy's use of the line "also means something real different from when Angel said it."

=== Artwork ===
When pencilling Giles' demise in Issue #39, Georges Jeanty first had the intention of making the panels show extreme close ups of Angel twisting Giles' neck. However, he opted to parallel Jenny's death from season two's "Passion." He explains, "I really wanted the impact to come across and for the reader to understand that Giles was being killed here. Drawing such a quick action was tough because, of course, comics don't move, so I had to capture the act as it happens)." He also confirms that the last panel of Buffy, curled on the floor in tears, was foreshadowed in issue #10 "Anywhere but Here" when Robin presented Buffy and Willow with visions of the past, present, and future.

Preceded by "Twilight"	Buffy the Vampire Slayer Season Eight storylines 2010–2011	Succeeded by —
