= Retreat (Buffy the Vampire Slayer) =

Story arc of Buffy the Vampire Slayer

- Cover of Buffy the Vampire Slayer Season Eight: Retreat trade paperback collected edition Art by Jo Chen
- Publisher: Dark Horse Comics
- Publication date: July – November 2009
- Genre: Action/adventure, horror; Based on Buffy the Vampire Slayer; Vampire
- Title(s): Buffy the Vampire Slayer Season Eight #26-30
- Main characters: Buffy Summers; Willow Rosenberg; Daniel "Oz" Osbourne; Xander, Dawn, Andrew, Satsu, et al. Faith & Giles; Twilight, Amy, Warren & Riley

Creative team
- Writers: Jane Espenson; Joss Whedon
- Penciller: Georges Jeanty
- Inker: Andy Owens
- Colorist: Michelle Madsen

With respect to the Buffy the Vampire Slayer franchise
- The material covered in this article is a continuity issue in the canon of Buffy the Vampire Slayer.

"Retreat" is the sixth story arc of the Buffy the Vampire Slayer Season Eight series of comic books, based upon the television series of the same name, written by Buffy creator Joss Whedon and television screenwriter Jane Espenson. The story returns the action to the central plot of vampire Slayer Buffy Summers and her friends in the fight against the masked person Twilight, alongside his followers Amy Madison and Warren Mears. This story arc features the character of Oz, a werewolf who is Buffy's schoolfriend and Willow Rosenberg's ex-boyfriend, who last appeared canonically in the television series' fourth season.

== Plot ==
=== Part I (Issue #26) ===
The arc picks up following from the story of "Predators and Prey", with Slayers on the run in the new pro-vampire society. The issue begins with Willow transporting Buffy to their new base, using heavy amounts of magic; a glamour makes the base invisible, and makes Buffy and Willow appear like a fish and a seagull, while layers of magical force fields and protections surround the base. At the base, flushed out from their regular bases, are Slayers from around the world such as Satsu and Kennedy. Meanwhile, Faith and Giles are forced from their underground bunker in Berlin by demonic assault, and vow to make their way to Buffy and co. Similarly, Andrew and his Slayers are hiding out underground when they encounter Warren, who attempts to distract Andrew while Amy has summoned goatmen demons. They too, vow to escape to Buffy's base.

At the headquarters, Buffy allows her friends entry and is tearfully reunited with Giles. The base soon comes under heavy attack from the local demon population, and the group is forced onto the roof to repel their advances. Magical barriers fall to the demons and their use of conventional modern warfare. There are heavy casualties as Slayers fall to demon attack. Slayers who are also witches become overwhelmed by the pressure of supporting the magical barrier, and at least one has her brain fried by the struggle. After interrogating a demon that Satsu has captured, Willow informs Buffy that their heavy use of magic revealed their location to Twilight. The entire Slayer army is forced to retreat via the submarine Satsu commandeered in "Swell". On board, Giles expresses his concerns to Buffy about Willow's extremely heavy use of magic; Buffy admits her concerns and relates her altercation with an evil Willow in the future ("Time of Your Life"). Buffy realises that Willow going on a magic ban however would not be sufficient, as every Slayer is magical by nature, but remembers that she knows someone who learnt how to suppress magic. Buffy has Willow do one last spell, and the submarine appears in the hills of Tibet. Oz looks on, and simply says "Huh."

=== Part II (Issue #27) ===
At Twilight's headquarters, Amy's spell erroneously indicates that Buffy and her friends all drowned when their submarine was sunk. One of Twilight's workers says that Willow's teleportation spell sent them to Mongolia but Riley tries to persuade Twilight that it is probably a mistake of the scanning technology. Riley, Amy and Warren are intrigued when Twilight lets slip that he "knows" Buffy. Twilight has them teleport to Mongolia along with some soldiers, but upon arrival there and not finding the Slayers there, he opts to bide his time until they slip up and make their location apparent.

Meanwhile, Oz introduces his partner Bayarmaa and their son Kelden and explains how through communing with nature and not "caging" the wolf within they are able to overcome their lycanthropy by having the Earth "absorb" the demon on the night of a full moon. However, he relates that some werewolves have formed a splinter group with an ideology similar to that of Veruca; werewolves like Oz and Bay now carry knives for protection. While he is unsure how their methods will work for witches and Slayers, he offers to help despite the risk to his family Buffy has brought with her. As a first order, the Slayers have been recommended physical exertion and are asked to start burying the submarine.

=== Part III (Issue #28) ===
Andrew knocks on Giles' door to announce he suspects there is a spy in their midst, and that anyone is a possibility. Rather than arouse suspicion, Andrew uses a camcorder to secretly interview Oz's family and the Slayer organization in a callback to the Season Seven episode "Storyteller" (2003). This acts as a framing device to shift between several plot threads and sets of characters.

In his documentary, he hears more from Bay about how "redirecting" magic works and learns that some Slayers have been acquiring high-tech weapons in lieu of their magical strength; he hears from "malcontents" Willow, Satsu and Kennedy regarding their displeasure with Buffy's tactics; he overhears Buffy and Faith reconnecting, while Buffy confesses her desire "not to stand over people anymore". Dawn and Xander talk about the chance to have a life and to "go for what [he] want[s]." Buffy and Xander share a tender moment where they discuss Buffy's feelings of contentedness and connectedness in their new situation, her increased ability to feel, and Buffy killing Dark Willow in the future; Xander convinces Buffy to tell Willow and then to come see him afterwards. On the discovery of Future Dark Willow, Andrew confronts Giles about the possibility of Willow becoming compromised; Giles accepts Andrew's concerns, and instructs him to follow her. Andrew surveys as Willow and Oz disagree about her possibilities for a normal life, and she expresses her resentment of him for settling down and denying his nature, although she is touched that he trusts her with Kelden. Buffy finds Willow with Kelden, where she is feeling optimistic about her chances for a family of her own one day, and is unfazed by Buffy's confession of having killed the future her because she feels that particular future is not set in stone. When she hears Buffy is going to see Xander, Willow reminds Buffy that he is "a good guy" and that even Buffy can have a future. After changing her clothes, Buffy wanders into Xander's room but is stopped "still as a grave" when she sees him kissing Dawn. She orders Andrew to shut off the camera, ending the film.

Andrew makes a confession of his own to the Slayers and to Willow, that he had suspected a spy amongst them but was wrong. The cat on Leah's lap (which had appeared in most scenes from Andrew's documentary) suddenly teleports away and Xander deduces it must have been Amy spying on them, from which Willow surmises Twilight has found them. Buffy faces away from Xander and Dawn and declares they're about to come under attack.

=== Part IV (Issue #29) ===
Buffy and her companions begin preparations for the imminent military assault by Twilight's forces. Xander and Dawn give the Slayers a crash course in the use of firearms, grenades, mines, and radar. Willow is distraught, no longer able to hide her despair over having sacrificed her powers, and at the fact that she is apparently destined to become evil in the future and be killed by Buffy. Buffy herself declines to use a gun, and tells Giles that she has an idea... to create special visual effects that may deceive Twilight's forces into thinking the Slayers and Wiccans still have their powers. Buffy is distracted by the ongoing signs of romantic affection between Xander and Dawn, but is able to keep her mind on the more pressing matters of defense. The first sign of Twilight's attack is the appearance of a military aircraft, which is shot down by the Slayers using shoulder-mounted missiles. This is quickly followed by an incoming tank assault. Monroe, the leader of the renegade werewolves Oz and his companions have been battling, arrives and unexpectedly offers help to Buffy and her group, stating that he opposes Twilight's agenda of eliminating magic from the world.

The battle begins, and the Slayers quickly make a move by sending a torpedo, salvaged from the submarine, into the midst of the enemy tanks, destroying many of them. Buffy realizes, however, that they have no chance of winning the battle without supernatural help. Oz appears from the battlefield carrying Bay, who has been injured. Buffy urgently asks Bay what happened to the magical powers that the Slayers and Wiccans surrendered. Bay responds that the three "Wrathful Goddesses" of Tibet, Remati, Vajrayogini and Ekajati took their powers in return for their protection. She says that, with the use of a group of magical scrolls, the goddesses can be summoned through anger. Buffy and Willow perform the required ritual, causing the earth to crack open and the three giant goddesses to appear.

=== Part V (Issue #30) ===
The three goddesses appear and start to wreak havoc. Buffy uses this momentary distraction to flip over a jeep to go retrieve something from the middle of the battlefield. However, it soon becomes apparent that the goddesses are indiscriminately killing, despite being summoned by Buffy and her army. Bay says that the goddesses have been away from humanity too long, and no longer recognize the people they are supposed to protect. The Slayer army retreats back to the temple.

Twilight's military commander wants to withdraw his men to save them from the slaughter, but Twilight orders them to fight on.

Buffy retrieves a badly injured Riley from the battlefield, who has apparently been working undercover for her all along. Riley is unable to give Buffy a way out, and they realise that they are fighting a lost battle. Buffy gathers the remaining troops and instructs them to collect all the injured into the temple, including the soldiers of Twilight. On their way to collect the injured, Satsu pushes Buffy out of the way of a sniper's bullet, but Buffy is then picked up by the blue Goddess, Remati, who looks her in the eye, then drops her to the ground from what should be a deadly height.

Five hours later, Twilight's army has the Slayers at gun point. Buffy wakes up where she was dropped, partially covered in snow, and sees the survivors of her defeated army being ushered into some transport vehicles. She closes her eyes to clear her mind, and when she opens them again she finds herself floating a long way above the ground. Somehow, Buffy has acquired the ability to fly.

== "Turbulence" ==
Though not part of the "Retreat" arc, the following issue, "Turbulence," concludes the Tibet story. In this story, Buffy begins testing her powers, and realises she has rapidly increased super strength, as well as the power to fly. Meanwhile, after various attempts in vain to pray for the return of their powers, Willow is hit suddenly by a blast of magic, which she fears is the "foreshock" of some future mystical event. Together with Buffy, who reveals her new enhanced powers, they make short work of the goddesses and rebury them in the Tibetan soil.

Buffy also confronts Xander about seeing him kiss Dawn, and admits that she has recently begun to feel romantically inclined towards him. Xander doesn't quite believe Buffy's feelings are serious, and points out that she even slept with another woman, Satsu, before considering him a viable mate. Buffy is hurt, and denies Xander's explanation is valid, but the pair hug as friends and move on, as Buffy accepts Xander's feelings for Dawn.

Preceded by "Predators and Prey"	Buffy the Vampire Slayer Season Eight storylines 2009	Succeeded by "Turbulence"/"Twilight"
