= A Beautiful Sunset =

- Cover of Buffy the Vampire Slayer Season Eight: A Beautiful Sunset; Art by Jon Foster
- Publisher: Dark Horse Comics
- Publication date: February 2008
- Genre: Action/adventure, horror; Based on Buffy the Vampire Slayer; Vampire
- Title(s): Buffy the Vampire Slayer Season Eight #11
- Main characters: Buffy Summers; Xander Harris; Dawn Summers; Satsu; Renee; Twilight

Creative team
- Writer: Joss Whedon
- Penciller: Georges Jeanty
- Inker: Andy Owens
- Colorist: Michelle Madsen

With respect to the Buffy the Vampire Slayer franchise
- The material covered in this article is a continuity issue in the canon of Buffy the Vampire Slayer.

"A Beautiful Sunset" is the eleventh issue of the Buffy the Vampire Slayer Season Eight series of comic books, a continuation of the television series of the same name. It is written by series creator Joss Whedon.

== Plot ==
Buffy reflects on her long history of being a Slayer and awakening the thousands of other girls around the world. In flashbacks of her narrative it is clear that in each battle the Scoobies and the others have fought came with sacrifice, but in a way, came with connection as well. Buffy admits that while it can be a bother sacrificing her life as well as others, it has always been done for the better. She has grown, she has moved on to the better and potential she always knew that she could live up to. Next, Xander and Buffy discuss a major problem: Simone Doffler. Xander tells Buffy that they tried to remove Simone from her rough, urban environment, but see her on a security tape stealing ammunition and other things in a robbery, the unconscious bodies of two guards are also found in the tapes. Buffy feels worried that she is not making a big change in the Slayer community and feels that what the government and everyone else thinks is true, slayers are acting above the law and she is not making the difference she says she is making. Xander comforts her and reassures her that things are going to be all right. The two then reflect on the revelation that Buffy stole from a lucrative bank to support her and the Slayer army and how she and Willow are having complex issues. Xander suggests that she ease her worries by going on a vampire hunt; Buffy decides to bring a "date", namely Satsu.

While the other Slayers and giant Dawn are celebrating at a huge party to ease their recent stresses, Buffy gears up to go on her vampire hunt. Satsu follows and Buffy forces her into the vampire lair. While the two are slaying, Buffy discusses how she knows that it was Satsu who gave her the kiss of true love when Buffy was bound in a magical sleep. While Buffy appreciates the gesture as kind and sweet, she is not interested in Satsu in a romantic way. Buffy tells Satsu of her romantic history and how all of her relationships, be it romantic, family, or friends, end with someone being hurt. Buffy states that there is something wrong with her, that everyone notices that something around her is wrong, that she can never really love, and like all Slayers, will be alone. She breaks down in tears but the moment is interrupted with a surprise attack from the malevolent Twilight. Satsu is knocked out, while Buffy and Twilight have a brawl in the air. Twilight bests Buffy in battle with moves she has never witnessed and takes her fear of flight to a whole new level by taking the fight into the air above the town. When he is about to throw the steeple of a church at her, Buffy tells him that killing her will only bring more Slayers to the call, that there will only be more to deal with. It is revealed that Twilight does not want to kill Buffy, yet. He wants to talk to her. He reveals that one Slayer in the world was enough to deal with, thousands is not tolerated. Specifically, he states that the world cannot contain them and eventually everyone will suffer for their existence. Twilight further feeds Buffy's insecurities by stating that they haven't changed the world or made a true difference. He flies off before the rising of the Sun, while Buffy rushes back to the graveyard that she and Satsu were in to help Satsu. While Satsu feels she has failed Buffy, Buffy comforts her.

In an unknown base, Twilight tells his comrades that to truly defeat the Slayer, one must strip her of her greatest armor, her moral certainty. They must twist her view of right and wrong, or twist the views of the ones she helps. Back in Scotland, in an infirmary, a bedridden and bandaged Satsu expresses her disappointment to a bandaged Buffy. Satsu understands Buffy's view on love and ask if she is hurt, Buffy states that she will eventually heal, that together they will heal. Buffy talks to Xander of her confrontation with Twilight and how he was stronger than anything she has encountered so far. She expresses the fears that Twilight released in her, that she was not making a difference. Buffy feels that she is not making a difference, that the girls she awakened weren't and that she did not have any connection with them. Xander assures her that Buffy awakened confidence and purpose that the girls never had before. Buffy jokes that Xander should just ask Renee out already, while Xander jokes that she should not state the obvious and that she should not change the subject. He assures to Buffy that what she created is more than a monster-fighting army, it is a connected state. Buffy still feels she has no connection amongst the girls, Xander replies that it is not she that is supposed to, the person who brought all of it together gave up her connection so that the others would feel it, so that the other chosen girls could feel like they had a place to fit in, a place where they belonged. Buffy agrees, and in contrast to the opening sees that what she did truly was for the better.

== Production ==
Writer Joss Whedon continues as writer from the last issue. Georges Jeanty returns as penciller since the No Future For You story arc.

Drawing sequences from the episode "Chosen" are used as flashbacks in the beginning of the story. Including the Slayer who was playing baseball, Willow tapping into the essence of the Slayer Scythe, Rona and Vi being chosen, and Buffy fighting Caleb.

== Canonical issues ==
This series has been described as 'canon' by both Whedon and various commentators. As the creator of Buffy, Joss Whedon's association with Buffyverse story is often linked to how canonical the various stories are. Since Whedon is writing this story, it will be seen as a continuation of the official continuity established by Buffy and Angel.

Season Eight contradicts and supersedes information given in the paperback novels set after Season Seven, such as Queen of the Slayers and Dark Congress, which are described as being set in an unofficial "parallel" continuity.

Twilight references Buffy killing Caleb in "Chosen" using the scythe by slicing him in two from the crotch up.

The mud on Satsu's face mirrors the sequence in "Restless" in which Buffy spreads mud across her face.

Intended to be set after BtVS's seventh season. The precise timing of this arc is currently uncertain.

Preceded by "Anywhere but Here"	Buffy the Vampire Slayer Season Eight storylines 2008	Succeeded by "Wolves at the Gate"
