= After These Messages... We'll Be Right Back! =

Issue of the Buffy the Vampire Slayer Season Eight comic book series

- Cover of Buffy the Vampire Slayer Season Eight: After These Messages... We'll Be Right Back! Art by Jo Chen
- Publisher: Dark Horse Comics
- Publication date: December 2008
- Genre: Action/adventure, horror; Based on Buffy the Vampire Slayer; Vampire
- Title(s): Buffy the Vampire Slayer Season Eight #20
- Main character(s): Buffy Summers; Xander Harris; Willow Rosenberg; Rupert Giles; Cordelia Chase

Creative team
- Writer: Jeph Loeb
- Pencillers: Georges Jeanty; Eric Wight
- Inker: Andy Owens
- Colorist: Dave Stewart

With respect to the Buffy the Vampire Slayer franchise
- The material covered in this article is a continuity issue in the canon of Buffy the Vampire Slayer.

"After These Messages... We'll Be Right Back!" is the twentieth issue of the Buffy the Vampire Slayer Season Eight series of comic books, a continuation of the television series of the same name. The issue is written by Jeph Loeb, and follows in the style of the undeveloped Buffy the Animated Series spin-off proposed in 2002, on which he worked alongside series creator Joss Whedon.

== Plot ==
As Buffy slays numerous demons, her thoughts say that she never gets any sleep anymore. When she finally gets a chance to rest (dirty all over and in Xander's bed), Buffy falls asleep while Xander screams for her to get out.

Buffy awakes (in an animated style) to her mother's voice telling her she's going to be late for school. Buffy is shocked to hear Joyce and hides her face in her pillow muttering "Dream, dream, go away. Come again another... never." Joyce enters her room with a younger Dawn as Buffy jumps from her bed and wraps her arms around Joyce. After moving to hugging Dawn and exclaiming that she isn't a centaur anymore, Joyce goes to leave the room. Buffy stops her and says, "I really am happy to see you." Joyce, after checking to see if Buffy has a fever, tells her if she doesn't get a move on, Buffy won't be able to go the party that night. Buffy is surprised to hear that she's going to a party at all.

At school, Buffy is surprised to see Willow alive, and back to her Season One self. Cordelia is, of course, making fun of Willow and Buffy steps in, informing Willow that one day she may be a mega-witch and Cordelia might be dead, to which Willow smirks and says, "Do I get to wear a pointy hat?" Xander comes rushing down the hallway on his skateboard and crashes. Principal Snyder threatens to take his skateboard away. Buffy tells Xander that Snyder might be eaten by a giant snake and that Xander might wear an eyepatch and be in charge of hundreds of hot girls. At that comment, Willow coughs and Buffy remembers that Willow likes Xander and is not aware of her homosexuality. Buffy, Xander, and Willow go looking for Giles.

That night, Xander, Buffy, and Willow go to the graveyard and meet Giles who says that "the fate of the world is at risk over what happens tonight." Buffy thinks to herself that she remembers this is "where [her] life gets in the way of [her] living it." Giles explaining that the disciples of Morgala worship something called Morgala. Buffy brushes off Giles' warning, casual spinning her stake, and says she'll find these disciples.

On a two-page spread, Buffy is fighting three disciples of Morgala and slays all of them, with unnecessary commentary by Xander.

They return to Giles in the graveyard, planning what they'll do for the party tonight. Giles says the disciples of Morgala were worshiping "the image of a dragon" to which Buffy responds that she "didn't see any dragon." Giles frankly says "Buffy, you need to take your role in this more seriously." Buffy, in a fit of rage, explains that she is only trying to have some fun and that someday there will be eighteen hundred slayers and everyone is going to call her "ma'am" and storms off to the party, leaving Giles speechless.

That night in Buffy's home. Buffy puts on the cross Angel gave her and stops to look at it. Joyce comes in to warn Buffy that she doesn't think the party Buffy is going to is going to be safe. Buffy reassures her that everything is going to be okay and hugs her mother. Joyce tells Buffy that she can always come home to which Buffy looks at her mother and says "right" with her thoughts saying "sigh."

On the way to the party, Buffy runs into Angel. Angel is impressed that Buffy went up against the five disciples of Morgala. Buffy ignores his comments, touching the side of his face and says "If you knew something about someone's past and...future...would you tell them?" Angel responds with "Probably not. You can't change a person's past. And just by telling them, you'll change their future into who knows what." Buffy says goodbye, and continues on her way to the party.

Standing in front of the house, Buffy realizes Angel said five disciples when she only took on three and storms off, hoping to make it back in time for the party.

Buffy finds the disciples who conjure up a dragon. Buffy leads it outside, it throws her into the air to which Buffy exclaims that she can see her house from that high. Cordelia, below the dragon and Buffy, trash talks how Buffy didn't even come to the party and Buffy's boot lands on her head. Buffy defeats the dragon by removing a large crystal from its forehead.

As Buffy falls to the ground, she wakes up (normal drawing) to Xander screaming for her to get out of his bed. Buffy awakens a bit disoriented. She finds it surprising that Xander has an eyepatch and that Dawn is a centaur and not a robot centaur. She also jumps at Willow calling her "You're all gay and magicky now!" After calming down she explains to Dawn, Xander, and Willow that she had a dream back in high school. She thought it would have been fun to go back to when times were more simple. But it turns out they were just the same as they are now, only in a different way.

In the final panel, Buffy is looking at the reader. The Scoobies (animated style) is behind her, faded slightly. Her voice over says "Maybe Angel was right. You can't change a person's past. And just by telling them, you'll change their future into who knows what. But for one brief shiny-shiny, it was great to go home again."

== Production ==
This issue was written by Jeph Loeb, who worked on the animated series with Joss Whedon. The issue has a link to the animated series and the plot is similar to one partially seen during a promo for the animated series. The issue had some problems at the beginning as artists had to be approved by Sarah Michelle Gellar's representatives, and since there was no official artist working yet, Loeb had not started work on the script as he 'tailors the script around the artist he is working with'.

== Canonical issues ==
This series has been described as 'canon' by both Whedon and various commentators. As the creator of Buffy, Joss Whedon's association with Buffyverse story is often linked to how canonical the various stories are. Since Whedon is writing this story, it will be seen as a continuation of the official continuity established by Buffy and Angel.

Season Eight contradicts and supersedes information given in the paperback novels set after Season Seven, such as Queen of the Slayers and Dark Congress, which are described as being set in an unofficial "parallel continuity.

=== Continuity ===
- It is revealed that Buffy and the Scoobies are aware of Cordelia's present-day demise.

== Timing ==
Season Eight is set after Buffy's seventh season and also after Angel's fifth and Angel: After the Fall. The dream sequence featured is set in Season One after the episode “Angel”.

Preceded by "Time of Your Life"	Buffy the Vampire Slayer Season Eight storylines 2008	Succeeded by "Predators and Prey"
