= Time of Your Life (Buffy comic) =

- Cover of Buffy the Vampire Slayer Season Eight: Time of Your Life trade paperback collected edition Art by Jo Chen
- Publisher: Dark Horse Comics
- Publication date: July – November 2008
- Genre: Action/adventure, horror; Based on Buffy the Vampire Slayer; Vampire
- Title(s): Buffy the Vampire Slayer Season Eight #16-19
- Main character(s): Buffy Summers; Melaka Fray; Willow Rosenberg; Dawn Summers; Xander Harris

Creative team
- Writer: Joss Whedon
- Penciller: Karl Moline
- Inker: Andy Owens
- Colorist: Michelle Madsen

With respect to the Buffy the Vampire Slayer franchise
- The material covered in this article is a continuity issue in the canon of Buffy the Vampire Slayer.

"Time of Your Life" is the fourth story arc that spans the sixteenth to nineteenth issues of the Buffy the Vampire Slayer Season Eight series of comic books, a continuation of the television series of the same name. The story, written by Joss Whedon, is a crossover with Whedon's earlier Buffy spin-off, the graphic novel Fray (2001-2003), "Time of Your Life" features artwork by Fray co-creator Karl Moline.

== Plot ==
=== Part I (Issue #16) ===
Buffy fights future slayer Melaka Fray, in midair in the future New York City. Flashing back to the past, Xander, Willow, and Buffy discuss what Willow saw during her encounter with Kumiko. Willow believes that she received the message for a reason, and that they must act before they lose another slayer. Dawn, meanwhile, turns into a centaur.

Somewhere in a lab, Twilight and Warren argue about a missile, which is covered in magical runes. They succeed to blasting the Scottish castle in which the 'Scoobies' live. In New York City, Buffy is transported to the future while confronting mystical time disruptions. She then meets Fray.

=== Part II (Issue #17) ===
Fray and her sister Erin find that their sibling Harth, now a vampire, has allied himself with a mysterious, dark haired woman. While supervising kidnap victims, said woman tells Harth that their actions 'now' will affect the past. Fray has a vague recollection of the woman, due to research.

Meanwhile, back in the present, Willow has tamed the demon that switched places with Buffy during the time incident. In Scotland, snake-warriors invade the castle; it is severely damaged. Several unnamed Slayers have died in the attack but most have escaped.

Fray and Buffy meet an ally, Gunther, a fish-like mutant in an attempt to gain more information about their enemies. Elsewhere, Harth tells his partner that he wants to kill Fray for being the only thing he ever loved; her pain is his joy. It is then revealed that Harth's ally (known to him as "The Madwoman") is none other than Dark Willow.

=== Part III (Issue #18) ===
In the Scottish woods after the main castle's explosion, Xander and Dawn continue their escape from the creatures that invaded the castle. During a brief respite, a horde of forest creatures threaten them and order them to leave their woods. The forest beings become nonplussed when Dawn tells them they aren't as scary as what has been chasing them.

In the present, Willow continues to find a way to retrieve Buffy from the future while Kennedy questions if Willow can contact her source instead. In response, Willow asks if Kennedy truly trusts her and if she believes that whatever they do is for the greater good - when Kennedy agrees, Willow explains that she must speak to Saga Vasuki and in order to do this, she must orgasm. Kennedy and Willow then have sex to achieve this end and when Willow finds Saga she asks her how to get Buffy back to the present. Saga tells Willow that the time rift will reopen that night and she only wants Willow to reach inside and take Buffy out without looking inside. Willow obeys and bids farewell for now to Saga.

Buffy searches through the Watchers' diaries and is completely befuddled and upset because there are a few ambiguous references to her and absolutely nothing recorded about the Slayer army she created. She and Fray decide to head to the "Uppers," a normally secure area of Haddyn where vampires cannot usually get access to, and steal a flying car with access to the area. Meanwhile, Gunther is visited by Harth and other vampires. In response to Gunther revealing Harth's activities to Fray, Harth leaves a squad of vampires to attack Gunther instead is his tank. Buffy and Fray witness a group of vampires attacking defenseless humans. While Fray wants to slay the vampires, Buffy attempts to stop her, reminding her that according to Gunther, Harth sends out hunting parties of vampires, that they need to find where the parties are coming from, and that they cannot afford the time to rescue everyone who needs rescuing. Fray refuses to listen and slays the vampires, leaving Buffy alone to drive the flying car. After Fray finishes off all the vampires, Dark Willow approaches Fray, informing her that she has not been human for "quite some time now." She tells Fray that her concerns are more personal than just getting rid of the lurks and shows that her magical powers have almost completely deteriorated, before requesting to show something to Fray.

Buffy returns to Fray's apartment alone, where she is confronted by Fray's sister Erin, who believes Buffy is an intruder. After Buffy reveals that she is looking for Fray, Erin apologizes and the two discuss various matters relating to Fray, sisters, and how Buffy is a slayer from the past. In the middle of the conversation, Buffy is zapped with a ray gun and falls to the floor in pain. As Erin kneels over Buffy's unconscious body, remarking "Mel...are you sure about this?", as Fray responds: "I'm sure. We're saving the world."

=== Part IV (Issue #19) ===
In the present, Dawn, Xander and the forest creatures prepare to battle against the demons that invaded the castle. As the fight starts, they are outnumbered until Xander's team of slayers appear with a group of Wiccans, who use magic to make the creatures corporeal, and easier to kill. Meanwhile, Twilight watches as Warren and Amy argue over the failed attack on the castle as Twilight turns to a new ally: Riley. Riley reveals that Buffy secretly met up with him in New York and requested that he act as her inside man against Twilight.

In the future, Buffy has been kidnapped and tied up in Dark Willow's lair by Fray and Erin. While Buffy is unconscious, Dark Willow laments on how long she has lived. Fray asks what the plan is, telling Dark Willow that she won't kill a slayer, no matter what Dark Willow has shown her. Willow tells Fray to keep Buffy there long enough to miss the "extraction" at midnight; she seems to want Buffy not to go back to the present.

Fray tells Erin what Dark Willow showed her: that if Buffy goes back, she will "change the world" - Willow has told her that Buffy going back to the present will result in changes that will mean Fray's future will not come to pass. Buffy regains consciousness and is stunned to see Dark Willow. Before they can speak further, Harth appears with a pack of vampires and reveals that Dark Willow told him that bringing Buffy to the future would cause his world to be, but told Fray the opposite. Willow responds that her intention for bringing Buffy to the future was in order to die; however, it is a matter regarding not who will die, but who kills them that matters. Furthermore, she admits that she is lying to either Fray or Harth but won't say who. As Harth threatens to kill everyone in the room, Gunther appears, still angry after his visit from Harth and his lurks, and causes a commotion that frees Buffy. Still wishing to save her world above all else, Buffy escapes and searches for the building where the extraction (caused by Willow in the present) is due to take place. When she arrives Fray is there, refusing to let Buffy leave in fear that Buffy's return to the past will erase Fray's present. The two slayers fight as Dark Willow watches.

In the present, a blindfolded Willow prepares to bring Buffy back. In the future, Buffy runs for the portal that appears and manages to beat Fray. Confronted by Dark Willow, Buffy questions her true motives before reluctantly (but with emotional pain) stabbing her in the heart. Present-day Willow reaches through the portal and brings Buffy back to the present, where Buffy is relieved to see Willow is still alive and well. In the future, Fray is aghast, but is surprised and comforted by Erin, who comments that their present still exists.

== Production and writing ==
This story arc was written by series creator Joss Whedon. The first issue was the eighth issue of the series to be written by Whedon. Penciller Karl Moline had previously worked with Whedon on the Buffy spin-off graphic novel Fray. Fray was featured as one of the main characters in this arc. This was the first time that Fray had crossed over into another part of the Buffyverse.

Whedon felt that by having Buffy interact with Fray and Haddyn's future dialect, he could comment upon his own distinctive use of language in Buffy, stating "Buffy blames herself for what's happened to the English language, and there's a lot of hubris in that joke. I like to think that adding Y's to words that don't usually have Y's is going to destroy the whole fabric of our society."

== Canonical Issues ==
This series has been described as 'canon' by both Whedon and various commentators. As the creator of Buffy, Joss Whedon's association with Buffyverse story is often linked to how canonical the various stories are. Since Whedon is writing this story, it will be seen as a continuation of the official continuity established by Buffy and Angel.

Season Eight contradicts and supersedes information given in the paperback novels set after Season Seven, such as Queen of the Slayers and Dark Congress, which are described as being set in an unofficial "parallel continuity".

Preceded by "Wolves at the Gate"	Buffy the Vampire Slayer Season Eight storylines 2008	Succeeded by "After These Messages... We'll Be Right Back!"
