= Wolves at the Gate (comics) =

Story arc from Buffy the Vampire Slayer

- Cover of Buffy the Vampire Slayer Season Eight: Wolves at the Gate trade paperback collected edition Art by Jo Chen
- Publisher: Dark Horse Comics
- Publication date: March – June 2008
- Genre: Action/adventure, horror; Based on Buffy the Vampire Slayer; Vampire
- Title(s): Buffy the Vampire Slayer Season Eight #12-15
- Main character(s): Buffy Summers; Xander Harris; Willow Rosenberg; Dawn Summers; Andrew Wells; Dracula; Satsu; Renee

Creative team
- Writer(s): Drew Goddard
- Penciller(s): Georges Jeanty
- Inker(s): Andy Owens
- Colorist(s): Michelle Madsen

With respect to the Buffy the Vampire Slayer franchise
- The material covered in this article is a continuity issue in the canon of Buffy the Vampire Slayer.

"Wolves at the Gate" is the third story arc that spreads from the twelfth to the fifteenth issue of the Buffy the Vampire Slayer Season Eight series of comic books, a continuation of the television series of the same name. It is written by Drew Goddard.

== Plot ==
=== Part I (Issue #12) ===
At night, Xander and Renee observe a pack of wolves lingering by the moor. Willow arrives at the castle with Andrew, who sends himself off to bed right away, just as Willow is attacked by a mysterious woman shrouded in fog. Meanwhile, Buffy and Satsu talk together in bed, following a surprising one-night stand. They agree to keep it a secret but this does not last as almost instantly, most of their friends barge in with various yet valid excuses.

Various threats keep the Slayers busy as a lycanthrope infiltrates the armory. An assistant helps him steal the Scythe, a powerful Slayer weapon. Xander and Renee act on a hunch and travel to visit Dracula, who Xander sheepishly calls Master.

=== Part II (Issue #13) ===
Fifteen minutes prior to Xander and Renee's visit, Dracula reflects on his solitude. Unlike his previous appearances as young and handsome, he now appears to be a bearded old man in a soiled bathrobe and his reputation amongst the local people has greatly diminished. However, upon hearing that Xander is visiting, Dracula cleans himself up and greets Xander as his "manservant," to which Xander reciprocates by calling him "master." Dracula offends Renee and appalls Xander by referring to Renee as a Moor. Nevertheless, he welcomes the pair inside, despite initially seeming to try to convince them to leave. Dracula reveals that while drunk, he had accidentally gambled away the secret to his powers to the Japanese vampires in exchange for a motorcycle. He agrees to help them defeat the Japanese vampires, despite his hatred of Buffy, claiming: "Nobody steals from Dracula."

In Scotland, Andrew informs young Slayers of Dracula's known various powers and how Dracula and Xander's friendship developed following Dracula's appearance in Sunnydale and after Anya Jenkins' death. Meanwhile, Buffy learns from Aiko, the leader of the Japanese slayer squad, that the leader of the Japanese vampires is named Toru. Buffy prepares to take all the slayers from headquarters to Japan; when Satsu suggests leaving a few as rearguard Buffy snaps at her and demands to have her orders followed. On their flight to Tokyo, Willow approaches Satsu and comforts her about the tension between her and Buffy following their one-night stand. She discusses Buffy's difficult position as general, and reminds Satsu that Buffy is not a lesbian and that she shouldn't get her hopes up. Satsu says she knows, and the serious part of the conversation is over. Willow then jokingly interrogates Satsu as to how Buffy was in bed.

In downtown Tokyo, Aiko keeps a close eye on Toru and Raidon in the streets. However, unbeknownst to her they have spotted her tailing them. Tracking them, she finds herself alone in an alley where Toru has strategically left a mysterious, glowing red ring on the ground for her to pick up. Aiko reaches for it, when suddenly the vampire gang's witch Kumiko flies overhead behind her with the Scythe. For a few seconds, the Scythe, the device, and Aiko conduct a red energy, before Toru appears in front of Aiko and breaks her jaw with a single punch, asking her how it feels to be a regular girl again. Before she can answer, Toru takes a horrific bite in her neck and kills her. Toru looks over at Raidon and claims the beta-test was successful. It is now time to take this technology global. The last panel is of Kumiko flying triumphantly into the sky, revealing a far larger ring device on the roof of a building.

=== Part III (Issue #14) ===
Buffy and the Slayers finally arrive in Tokyo to find Aiko's body strung up against a skyscraper with a message printed beneath her body in blood: "Tokyo He Youkoso" ("Welcome to Tokyo"). As night falls in the Tokyo Slayer headquarters, Dracula arrives and criticizes that neither Buffy nor Willow considered using a containment spell called "Carolina's Grasp" to defeat Toru, despite the fact neither of them are familiar with the spell. Meanwhile, Toru discusses Buffy's arrival in Tokyo and prepares his forces.

Elsewhere, a man smokes a cigarette outside when Renee suddenly approaches him in tears, claiming that she has gotten lost. the man suggests walking her to the hotel by going through a park and then reveals his vampire face when they are alone. Before he can attack, Buffy, Willow, and Xander appear and Willow performs Carolina's Grasp. The vampire finds himself boxed in a magical prison where he can not turn into fog and Willow pours gasoline on the vampire. As Buffy interrogates him, he confesses all of Toru's plan to use the lens to magnify Kumiko's spell and take away the Slayers' powers. Satisfied with the information, Buffy lights him on fire, pointing out that she made no promise to spare him if he talked.

At the Japanese Slayer headquarters, Buffy orders Satsu to stay there with other Slayers while she and others attack Toru and his vampires. Satsu defies her orders, saying that Buffy is either trying to avoid her or protect her and she won't put up with it, which Buffy finds sexually attractive. Xander and Renee discuss awkward situations before first dates and wind up kissing, much to Dracula's discomfort.

Outside of Toru's flat, Buffy, Renee, Xander, Dracula, Satsu, Andrew and Leah are ready to attack the army of about a thousand vampires. Willow summons Dawn, whose giant stature frightens the vampires as she begins to attack them. As Buffy's group storm Toru's flat, she attacks Toru, who turns out to be a decoy. The real Toru appears from behind her with the Scythe and comments they have effectively fallen into his trap.

=== Part IV (Issue #15) ===
Renee becomes a casualty of Toru's trap, much to Xander's grief, while Dracula sends Buffy to retrieve Willow as Dracula prepares to defend Xander. Willow is locked in an aerial battle with the vampire witch Kumiko, who reveals that they are both students of the unknown power Saga Vasuki and thus knows the counters to her spells. However, Willow turns this advantage against Kumiko by tapping into Kumiko's mind. Whether the spell had its intended effect is not clear, but Willow is plunged into a vision of a burning city, the Scythe, and the snake woman Willow was shown intimately involved with in Sephrilian's vision in 'Anywhere But Here'. The snake woman calls her 'Darling Willow' and asks if Willow thought she couldn't find her. She also asks if she thought she could hide from who she is and what is to come. Willow emerges from the vision and passes out, but the spell leaves Kumiko seemingly unaffected. As Willow begins to lose consciousness, Buffy steels herself, then jumps from the penthouse to stab Kumiko midair. She and an unconscious Willow continue falling.

Dawn, leading the fight out on the streets, is confronted by a mecha version of herself, albeit with a tail, who taunts Dawn. With Andrew's coaching, she defeats her mecha double. Toru notices Kumiko's absence, and begins the incantation to de-Slayer Buffy and her army. Dracula, Satsu, and the Slayers burst onto the roof and enter melee with the vampires; when Dracula tackles Toru, the Scythe is sent flying. Satsu jumps off the building to catch it and is flown back to the top of the roof by Willow, who emerged with Buffy from the pool of water Willow had created at the last minute to cushion their fall. Dracula, unable to perform the spell himself because he will be affected as well, directs Willow on the incantation to remove the vampires' special powers. Toru insults Dracula, who proves to be a powerful adversary and cuts off Toru's hands and feet. However, he leaves Xander to execute Toru, as revenge for Renee's death. Buffy comforts Xander as she orders the rest of the slayers to hunt down the fleeing vampires.

The following night, Dracula, who has lost his powers of domination, comes to Xander as he its vigil with Renee's ashes. Xander refuses his company and threatens Dracula when he addresses Xander as "manservant" and similar subordinate titles. Satsu and Buffy have a heart-to-heart, where Satsu confesses both her love for Buffy, and her acknowledgment that she needs to not be in love with her. Satsu asks to be left in Japan as the field office leader, to give them some distance. Buffy agrees, and then they share an intimate night as goodbye. At the same time, Willow is magically communicating with the snake woman (presumably Saga Vasuki), Xander is scattering Renee's ashes, and Dracula is leaving by ship.

== Production ==
Writer Drew Goddard previously worked for the television series' last season, penning numerous episodes such as "Selfless", "Conversations with Dead People", and "Dirty Girls". In Buffy comics, Drew had previously written the Dracula story "Antique" for the canonical Tales of the Vampires, which depicts Dracula as a man tormented by his aging and loneliness. "Wolves at the Gate" makes reference to "Antique", and Xander's previous enthrallment by Dracula, when Xander comments to Renee in Part I that, "sometimes when I get around this guy, I start acting... wonky."

Goddard had chosen to use two of his favorite characters in the story, Andrew Wells and Dracula. Dark Horse editor Scott Allie comments that Goddard would be the preferred writer should Dark Horse decide to do an Andrew miniseries.

== Controversy ==
Issue #12 has received a great deal of publicity and criticism. The debate centered on the main protagonist, Buffy, having slept with a fellow Slayer. Some critics speculated that Whedon had Buffy involved in a lesbian encounter as a marketing ploy. However, Whedon has profusely denied these claims, adding that it was a logical step for the character in light of the series. Whedon has also been supported by the issue's writer Drew Goddard, Season Eight editor Scott Allie, and reportedly a large number of fans over the Internet. GLAAD honored the arc in March 2009 with its "Outstanding Comic Book" recognition at the 20th Annual GLAAD Media Awards.

== Canonical issues ==
This series has been described by Joss Whedon, the creator of Buffy, as a continuation of the official continuity established by the Buffy the Vampire Slayer and Angel television series.

Season Eight contradicts and supersedes information given in the paperback novels set after Season Seven, such as Queen of the Slayers and Dark Congress, which are described as being set in an unofficial "parallel continuity".

== Timing ==
- Set after BtVS's seventh season. The precise timing of this arc is uncertain.

== See also ==
- Dracula
- Count Dracula
- Dracula in popular culture

Preceded by "A Beautiful Sunset"	Buffy the Vampire Slayer Season Eight storylines 2008	Succeeded by "Time of Your Life"
