= Buffy the Vampire Slayer Season Eight =

Comic book series

- Trade paperback cover of The Long Way Home. Art by Jo Chen

Publication information
- Publisher: Dark Horse Comics
- Schedule: Monthly
- Format: Limited series
- Genre: Horror
- Publication date: March 14, 2007 – January 19, 2011
- No. of issues: 40 (core series); 3 (one-shots)
- Main character: Scooby Gang

Creative team
- Created by: Joss Whedon
- Written by: Joss Whedon; Brian K. Vaughan; Drew Goddard; Jane Espenson; Brad Meltzer and others
- Penciller(s): Georges Jeanty; Karl Moline
- Inker: Andy Owens
- Colorist(s): Dave Stewart; Michelle Madsen

Collected editions
- The Long Way Home: ISBN 1593078226
- No Future for You: ISBN 159307963X
- Wolves at the Gate: ISBN 1595821651
- Time of Your Life: ISBN 1595823107
- Predators and Prey: ISBN 1595823425
- Retreat: ISBN 1595824154
- Twilight: ISBN 1595825584
- Last Gleaming: ISBN 1595826106

Buffy the Vampire Slayer Season Eight is a comic book series published by Dark Horse Comics from 2007 to 2011. It serves as a canonical continuation of the television series Buffy the Vampire Slayer, and follows the events of that show's final televised season. It is produced by Joss Whedon, who wrote or co-wrote three of the series arcs and several one-shot stories. The series was followed by Season Nine in 2011.

Season Eight was originally supposed to consist of about 25 issues, but eventually expanded to a 40-issue run. The series also spawned a handful of spin-off titles, including a Tales of the Vampires follow-up and one-shots focusing on Willow and Riley.

The success of the series prompted IDW Publishing and Whedon to publish a concurrent continuation of the Angel television series, titled Angel: After the Fall, and a Spike comic book series, which bridges some aspects of continuity between After the Fall and Season Eight. A motion comic version of the series debuted in 2010.

== Plot ==
A year after the end of the television series, Buffy and Xander now lead command-central, which is situated at a citadel in Scotland. At their disposal are a wide array of psychics, seers, witches, and Slayers, along with a vast amount of technology, revealed to be the result of Buffy robbing a Swiss bank to acquire the funds. There are 1,800 Slayers worldwide according to Buffy, almost 500 of whom are working with the Scoobies, separated into 10 squads. Squads include Andrew's in Southern Italy, Giles' in England, Vi's in New York City, Robin's in Cleveland, Ohio, and another led by Rona's in Chicago, Illinois. For Buffy's protection and because her name is feared worldwide, two decoys are put in place: one partying in Rome and one on a mission in demonic caverns. Buffy now relies heavily on Willow, whose character arc sees her under the tutelage of a powerful demon called Saga Vasuki. Under Saga Vasuki, Willow's power has grown phenomenally; for example, she can now fly and cast complicated and large-scale spells.

In the wake of Sunnydale's destruction, elements within the U.S. government view the expanded Slayers and the Scooby Gang as international terrorists and characterize Buffy as a "charismatic, uncompromising and completely destructive" leader. General Voll, a member of a mystically aware Initiative-like government project, describes fear of their resources, power, and ideology. The government has teamed with Sunnydale survivor/powerful witch Amy Madison and Season 6 villain Warren Mears in the hopes of bringing Buffy down. Simultaneously, an evil British socialite Slayer called Lady Genevieve Savidge plots to usurp Buffy's place in the Slayer hierarchy, and a shrewd cabal of Japanese vampires scheme to reverse the global activation of Potential Slayers in "Chosen". The appearances of these villains are connected to "Twilight", the enigmatic Big Bad of the season, a masked person who views the expanded ranks of Slayers as a threat to humanity and wants to destroy them, and bring about an end to all magic on Earth. It later transpires that like Amy and Warren, Buffy's ex-boyfriend Riley Finn is also loyal to Twilight, though Riley turns out to have been Buffy's double agent.

Halfway through the season, ditzy vampire Harmony Kendall rises to fame as a reality TV star and ushers in a new pro-vampire, anti-Slayer world order. Under attack from Twilight and other demons as well as militaries across the world, the various Slayer squads (including Faith) reconvene in retreat from their enemy. Because Twilight can now track the group through their use of magic, Buffy and her friends relocate to Tibet to learn from Oz how to suppress magical natures for witches and Slayers alike. Giles and Buffy are both concerned with the extent to which they rely on Willow, worried she may go overboard again as in Season Six; Buffy's fears are in part justified by her visit to the future (a crossover with the Whedon miniseries Fray) where she was forced to kill a future Dark Willow. Following the fray with Twilight, in which many Slayers were killed, Buffy developed abilities similar to those of Twilight.

A subplot involves the repercussions of Dawn's college relationship with a boy named Kenny (described as a "thricewise"), whom she cheated on, losing her virginity to his roommate. Consequently, Dawn has been cursed with mystical transformations: first into a giant, then a centaur, and finally a living doll until she apologizes to Kenny and breaks the spell. Among the core group, Buffy is for a time romantically drawn to another woman: a Slayer named Satsu, and Xander to Slayer Renée; Willow's relationship with the core group is more estranged, while she protectively withholds Kennedy from her friends. Kennedy is unaware of the sexual aspect of Willow's relationship with Saga Vasuki. Giles and Buffy, at odds, stop speaking with one another. Giles works with Faith to prevent more Slayers from going rogue. Although Buffy comes to feel that her only compatible mate is Xander, and is upset to learn that he truly loves Dawn, she and Angel succumb to their desires for one another upon their reunion, though the extent to which they were in control of their actions is uncertain.

In the series' penultimate arc, Twilight is revealed to be Buffy's former lover, Angel. Angel attempts to explain that his Twilight persona was used to unify the anti-Slayer movement, thus limiting the potential destruction they could have caused working independently. His secondary goal was to push Buffy's development so that the two of them could reunite romantically and ascend to a higher plane of existence, itself called Twilight. However, whatever magical effect Angel was under seemed to wane after Buffy realised she was needed back on Earth to assist her friends as demons poured in from other dimensions to destroy the old universe. At the last moment, Buffy's other love, Spike, arrives in a futuristic ship to announce he has a solution to the problem at hand. In the final arc, "Last Gleaming", Spike's information leads them to the source both of magic and of Twilight's power, a mystical "seed" buried beneath Sunnydale. Giles plans to destroy it, but Twilight possesses Angel and compels him to kill Giles by snapping his neck. Distraught, Buffy smashes the seed herself. Twilight is stopped, but magic is also removed from the universe. Though Slayers and vampires retain their powers, witches are left entirely powerless. Subsequently, Willow breaks up with Kennedy and Faith inherits Giles' estate and attempts to begin Angel's rehabilitation. A pariah in the community of Slayers and former witches, Buffy moves to San Francisco where she lives as a houseguest at Dawn and Xander's apartment, and resumes her former duties as Slayer: patrolling at night for vampires.

== Writers and story arcs ==
Joss Whedon serves as "executive producer" for the series across every issue, giving his other writers notes on characterization, continuity and his overall concept as he would when overseeing Buffy as a television series. Whedon wrote the first story arc ("The Long Way Home", #1–4), the fourth ("Time of Your Life", #16–19), the final story arc ("Last Gleaming", #36–40), and several intermediary one-shot stories (#5, #10, #11, "Willow", and #31). Comic and television writer Brian K. Vaughan became the first guest writer on the series, writing the second story arc "No Future for You" (#6–9). While Vaughan was not a "Buffyverse" staff member, he was a fan of both series (particularly the character of Faith) and Joss Whedon himself was a fan of Vaughan's Marvel Comics series Runaways, on which he served as writer during the period Vaughan wrote "No Future for You." Former Buffy and Angel writer Drew Goddard wrote the series' third arc, "Wolves at the Gate" (#12–15). Goddard first became a Buffy writer in its final season, starting with the episode "Selfless" and finishing with the Angel episode "The Girl in Question", which itself obliquely hints at the life of Buffy post-season seven. Goddard went on to become a writer for the movie Cloverfield and acclaimed American dramas Lost and Alias (all working alongside producer J. J. Abrams) while also penning the story "Antique" for canonical Buffy comic book Tales of the Vampires, which he references in "Wolves at the Gate".

Film, comics and television writer-producer Jeph Loeb wrote issue #20 of the series ("After These Messages... We'll Be Right Back!". Loeb had previously been involved with Whedon in the conception of Buffy the Animated Series, which never came to be. Following Loeb are Buffyverse alumni Jane Espenson, Doug Petrie, Drew Z. Greenberg, and Steven S. DeKnight as well as comic book writer Jim Krueger, who each wrote an issue between issues #21 and #25 ("Predators and Prey"), which is a single arc told from a number of different perspectives. These one-shots follow the perspectives of Harmony (#21, Espenson), Satsu/Kennedy (#22, DeKnight), Buffy/Andrew (#23, Greenberg), Giles/Faith (#24, Krueger) and a Xander/Dawn issue which will also reveal more about Twilight (#25, Petrie). Jane Espenson returned for a five-issue arc involving the character of Oz for issues #26–30, titled "Retreat" and also wrote a one-shot about Riley. Joss Whedon returned to write two one-shots, "Willow: Goddesses and Monsters" and issue #31, "Turbulence". Brad Meltzer, author of several New York Times best-selling books and later both Identity Crisis and Justice League for DC Comics wrote the penultimate story arc of Season Eight, "Twilight", which is issues #32–35. Whedon himself resumes authorship for the final five issues (#36–40, "Last Gleaming") of the series, bringing Season Eight to an end.

Dark Horse Presents has also offered several short, canonical side stories to the mix. "Harmony Bites" by Espenson and Moline is a fictional episode of Harmony Kendall's television series, tying into issue #21. "Vampy Cat Play Friend" is a fictional television commercial tying in with issue #22, written by Steven S. DeKnight and illustrated by Camilla d'Errico. Joss Whedon teamed up with Jo Chen to produce "Always Darkest", a depiction of Buffy's terrible nightmares, and Espenson teamed up with Moline again to produce "Harmony Comes to the Nation", a fictional interview for The Colbert Report where Harmony lays out her ambitions, both tying in with Jane Espenson's "Retreat" arc. Jackie Kessler wrote "Tales of the Vampires: Carpe Noctem", a two-part ministory with the previously unseen characters Ash and Cyn, about the consequences of Harmony Kendall's television series from a vampire's point of view.

== Publication ==
=== Issues ===
Title	Issue #	Release date
"The Long Way Home, Part I"	1	March 14, 2007
Writer: Joss Whedon		Penciller: Georges Jeanty
Buffy Summers leads a squad of Slayers in Scotland with the help of her friend Xander Harris and her sister-turned-giant Dawn. Meanwhile, a government installation investigates the demolished town of Sunnydale.
"The Long Way Home, Part II"	2	April 4, 2007
Writer: Joss Whedon		Penciller: Georges Jeanty
The government recruits Amy Madison as their operative to dispatch Buffy. She travels to Scotland, unleashes an army of zombies on the castle, and binds Buffy in a sleep that can only be broken by a true love's kiss.
"The Long Way Home, Part III"	3	May 2, 2007
Writer: Joss Whedon		Penciller: Georges Jeanty
Still bound in a sleep, Buffy explores her dreamspace with Ethan Rayne. Willow Rosenberg comes to the Slayers' aid in a battle against Amy and her army of zombies.
"The Long Way Home, Part IV"	4	June 6, 2007
Writer: Joss Whedon		Penciller: Georges Jeanty
Amy kidnaps Willow and presents her to a skinless Warren Mears. Xander and some practicing witches attempt to create a portal to send Buffy and Satsu to Willow's rescue. A U.S. government general warns Buffy of "Twilight", the end of magic.
"The Chain"	5	July 25, 2007
Writer: Joss Whedon		Penciller: Paul Lee
A young woman reveals how she went from being a high school student to being Buffy's decoy.
"No Future for You, Part I"	6	September 5, 2007
Writer: Brian K. Vaughan		Penciller: Georges Jeanty
In Cleveland, Rupert Giles recruits Faith to assassinate Lady Genevieve Savidge: a rogue Slayer who threatens to destroy the world. Meanwhile, in Scotland, Buffy admits to Xander her worry of "Twilight".
"No Future for You, Part II"	7	October 3, 2007
Writer: Brian K. Vaughan		Penciller: Georges Jeanty
Faith infiltrates Lady Genevieve Savidge's estate only to discover an amicable connection with her. Willow questions Dawn on her newly giant stature.
"No Future for You, Part III"	8	November 7, 2007
Writer: Brian K. Vaughan		Penciller: Georges Jeanty
Faith finds herself torn when Lady Genevieve reveals her plan to kill Buffy. Matters get worse, when Genevieve's mentor Roden kidnaps Buffy and brings her face to face with Faith.
"No Future for You, Part IV"	9	December 5, 2007
Writer: Brian K. Vaughan		Penciller: Georges Jeanty
Faith and Lady Genevieve engage in battle to the death. Buffy and Giles' relationship is further strained when she questions him about Faith's mission. Meanwhile, a mysterious character named Twilight meets with a U.S. government agent to discuss the events with Faith and Genevieve.
"Anywhere but Here"	10	January 2, 2008
Writer: Joss Whedon		Penciller: Cliff Richards
A Minder named Robin welcomes Buffy and Willow to Tichajt who presents to them the past, present, and future, revealing kept secrets between the best friends. Dawn embarrassingly reveals to Xander that she did not sleep with her boyfriend like most suspect, but instead slept with his college roommate.
"A Beautiful Sunset"	11	February 6, 2008
Writer: Joss Whedon		Penciller: Georges Jeanty
Buffy invites Satsu to dust a group of vampires at a graveyard. There, Buffy declares to her that she knows Satsu planted the true love's kiss on her when she was bound in sleep. Suddenly, Twilight attacks both of the girls and introduces to Buffy his malicious plan to destroy all of the Slayers.
"Wolves at the Gate, Part I"	12	March 5, 2008
Writer: Drew Goddard		Penciller: Georges Jeanty
Just when Xander, Renée, Andrew, Willow, and Dawn all walk in on Buffy and Satsu naked in bed, a group of Japanese vampires breach the castle walls and successfully steal the Scythe. In need for assistance to defeat the vampires, Xander seeks an old friend, Dracula.
"Wolves at the Gate, Part II"	13	April 2, 2008
Writer: Drew Goddard		Penciller: Georges Jeanty
When confronted by Xander about the Japanese vampires, Dracula realizes the group has stolen his unique powers, and commits to help out of pride. Meanwhile, Buffy is preparing an all-out assault against the vampires, who have been spotted in Tokyo by the slayer Aiko. The vampires spot Aiko's surveillance and set an ambush: the female vampire Kumiko uses the Scythe to magically revert Aiko into a regular, helpless girl, and the vampire leader Toru then kills her.
"Wolves at the Gate, Part III"	14	May 7, 2008
Writer: Drew Goddard		Penciller: Georges Jeanty
Buffy and her team arrive in Japan to find Aiko's corpse strung up with a welcome message written in her blood. They meet up with Xander, Renée, and Dracula, who teaches Willow a spell to contain the desolidifying vampires. With Giant Dawn as a distraction, the team assaults the vampires' lair, only to discover that it's a trap as Toru appears behind them and impales Renée on the scythe.
"Wolves at the Gate, Part IV"	15	June 4, 2008
Writer: Drew Goddard		Penciller: Georges Jeanty
Dracula sends Willow to perform the spell to destroy the vampires' special powers. No longer invincible, the Slayers charge and attack all of the vampires. Dawn is confronted by a mecha version of herself.
"Time of Your Life, Part I"	16	July 2, 2008
Writer: Joss Whedon		Penciller: Karl Moline
When Buffy and Willow reunite with Kennedy and Vi to unlock the secrets of the Scythe, Buffy finds herself transported into the future of Slayer Melaka Fray. In Scotland, Dawn transforms into a centaur and the castle is hit by a rocket sent by Amy and Warren.
"Time of Your Life, Part II"	17	August 6, 2008
Writer: Joss Whedon		Penciller: Karl Moline
After a shaky introduction, Buffy and Fray must join forces in order to discover the purpose of their meeting. Elsewhere in Haddyn, Fray's twin brother vampire Harth has teamed up with Dark Willow to affect time.
"Time of Your Life, Part III"	18	September 3, 2008
Writer: Joss Whedon		Penciller: Karl Moline
Xander and Dawn escape from the siege and enter deep in the forest, only to then encounter mystical tree creatures. In the future, Dark Willow convinces Fray to immobilize Buffy in order to save the world.
"Time of Your Life, Part IV"	19	November 26, 2008
Writer: Joss Whedon		Penciller: Karl Moline
When a portal temporarily opens between the timelines, Buffy rushes to get back to the present. However, Dark Willow and Fray will make sure she does otherwise. Meanwhile, in the present, Riley Finn shows allegiance to Twilight.
"After These Messages... We'll Be Right Back!"	20	December 17, 2008
Writer: Jeph Loeb		Penciller: Georges Jeanty, Eric Wight
Buffy wakes up and finds herself back in her 16-year-old body, conflicted with her Slayer duties when Cordelia Chase hosts a house party.
"Harmonic Divergence"	21	January 7, 2009
Writer: Jane Espenson		Penciller: Georges Jeanty
Harmony sets a contract with MTV to produce a reality television show, presenting vampires as helpless victims.
"Swell"	22	February 4, 2009
Writer: Steven S. DeKnight		Penciller: Georges Jeanty
When Kennedy is sent to Japan to evaluate Satsu's efforts as team leader, they are taken by surprise by some fierce furry creatures who want to do nothing more than destroy Buffy.
"Predators and Prey"	23	March 4, 2009
Writer: Drew Z. Greenberg		Penciller: Georges Jeanty
Buffy and Andrew embark on a trip to take down the rogue slayer Simone while the rest of the world still feels hatred toward the slayer population.
"Safe"	24	April 1, 2009
Writer: Jim Krueger		Penciller: Cliff Richards
Faith and Giles encounter a runaway Slayer named Courtney. The three investigate The Slayer Sanctuary and its tie to the town of Hanselstadt.
"Living Doll"	25	May 6, 2009
Writer: Doug Petrie		Penciller: Georges Jeanty
Buffy will finally have to take action regarding her little sister when Dawn's mysterious disappearance makes it a priority.
"Retreat, Part I"	26	July 1, 2009
Writer: Jane Espenson		Penciller: Georges Jeanty
Old friends such as Faith, Andrew, and Satsu are forced to return to Buffy's HQ, who are much the same as them under siege from Twilight's forces, humans and demons. Defenses fall as the Scottish castle comes under attack. The group learns Twilight is able to track them through their use of magic, forcing the team to retreat to Tibet to learn how to suppress magic from Oz.
"Retreat, Part II"	27	August 5, 2009
Writer: Jane Espenson		Penciller: Georges Jeanty
Upon arriving in Tibet, the group is filled in on what has happened to Oz since season 4 when he departed Sunnydale. Also, Twilight uses every technological and mystical way to locate the Slayers since they mysteriously vanished from his radar.
"Retreat, Part III"	28	September 2, 2009
Writer: Jane Espenson		Penciller: Georges Jeanty
Buffy and her group of Slayers use hard labor and meditation to suppress their inherent magic in order to remain hidden from Twilight. Meanwhile, Andrew uses his videocamera to seek out and expose a spy amongst them—but it may be too late.
"Retreat, Part IV"	29	October 7, 2009
Writer: Jane Espenson		Penciller: Georges Jeanty
Having been discovered by Twilight and his army, the Slayer Organization prepare to do battle with human weapons in order to survive to fight another day.
"Retreat, Part V"	30	November 4, 2009
Writer: Jane Espenson		Penciller: Georges Jeanty
The epic battle between the Slayers and Twilight's armies comes to a halt when three giant Goddesses rise from the ground and rain destruction on them.
"Turbulence"	31	January 13, 2010
Writer: Joss Whedon		Penciller: Georges Jeanty
Buffy admits her attraction to Xander and reveals she's inexplicably inherited superpowers that can defeat the Goddesses.
"Twilight, Chapter One: Buffy Has F#©$ing Superpowers"	32	February 3, 2010
Writer: Brad Meltzer		Penciller: Georges Jeanty
Buffy and Xander test the limits of her new superpowers; Willow suspects they originate from the dead Slayers.
"Twilight, Chapter Two: The Master Plan"	33	March 3, 2010
Writer: Brad Meltzer		Penciller: Georges Jeanty
Buffy discovers that Twilight is in fact her ex-boyfriend, Angel. Giles begins to explain the prophecy.
"Twilight, Chapter Three: Them F#©%ing (Plus the True History of the Universe)"	34	April 7, 2010
Writer: Brad Meltzer		Penciller: Georges Jeanty
Giles explains that the Slayer and the vampire are a part of a prophecy about the formation of a new dimension. Meanwhile, Buffy and Angel find themselves having sex and awaking in just such a place.
"Twilight, The Final Chapter: The Power of Love"	35	May 5, 2010
Writer: Brad Meltzer		Penciller: Georges Jeanty
Buffy and Angel choose to return to Earth to assist their friends as the old universe is invaded by extra-dimensional demons.
"Last Gleaming, Part I"	36	September 1, 2010
Writer: Joss Whedon		Penciller: Georges Jeanty
The revelation that Angel is Twilight breeds dissension among Buffy and her allies, just as Spike returns
"Last Gleaming, Part II"	37	October 6, 2010
Writer: Joss Whedon and Scott Allie		Penciller: Georges Jeanty
Spike informs Buffy that in order to destroy the Twilight realm, she must break the source of magic—a seed buried deep in Sunnydale.
"Last Gleaming, Part III"	38	November 3, 2010
Writer: Joss Whedon and Scott Allie		Penciller: Georges Jeanty
As Slayers all over the world engage in a mass battle against demon armies from other dimensions, Buffy and a select few get a hold of the Seed.
"Last Gleaming, Part IV"	39	December 1, 2010
Writer: Joss Whedon and Scott Allie		Penciller: Georges Jeanty
Angel stops Giles' attempt at destroying the Seed by snapping his neck. Mortified, Buffy breaks it and collapses into tears as the world is relieved of all magic, including Willow's abilities.
"Last Gleaming, Part V"	40	January 19, 2011
Writer: Joss Whedon		Penciller: Georges Jeanty
Months after the battle, Buffy is waitressing in San Francisco, living at Xander and Dawn's apartment. Simone kills the Military General and hunts for Buffy next.

=== One-shots ===
Title	Release date
"Tales of the Vampires: The Thrill"	June 3, 2009
Writer: Becky Cloonan	Penciller: Vasilis Lolos
In a small town in New Hampshire, a young man named Jacob befriends a reckless gang of vampires who enjoy drinking his blood. Jacob craves the high and the easy escape from the monotony of his life that this "bloodletting" provides. A mysterious character named May appears, who can help Jacob leave those high-school days behind, unless his friend Alexia doesn't stop her first.
"Willow: Goddesses and Monsters"	December 23, 2009
Writer: Joss Whedon	Penciller: Karl Moline
Following the demise of Sunnydale, Willow went on a walkabout where she met a very sultry, extremely powerful serpent lady who seems to be the key to unraveling the mysteries of what Willow is, and will become.
"Riley: Commitment through Distance, Virtue through Sin"	August 18, 2010
Writer: Jane Espenson	Penciller: Karl Moline
In the midst of the battle, Buffy's former flame, the demon-fighting soldier Riley Finn, seemingly in league with Twilight, was revealed as a double agent working for the Slayer army. Now Espenson and artist Karl Moline (Fray, Willow) uncover the secrets of Riley's recruitment by Buffy, his infiltration of Twilight's inner circle, and what's become of him and his superspy wife, Sam.

=== Trade paperbacks ===
The issues were collected together into trade paperbacks:

#	Title	Publisher	Year	ISBN	Reprints
1	The Long Way Home	Dark Horse Comics	October 24, 2007	ISBN 1593078226	Collects The reprinted material is, in whole or in part, from: Buffy the Vampire Slayer Season Eight #1–5
1	Credits and full notes: Writer(s) / Joss Whedon; Penciller(s) / Georges Jeanty; Paul Lee; A hardcover edition was also published at the same time.				Collects The reprinted material is, in whole or in part, from: Buffy the Vampire Slayer Season Eight #1–5
2	No Future for You	Dark Horse Comics	May 21, 2008	ISBN 159307963X	Collects The reprinted material is, in whole or in part, from: Buffy the Vampire Slayer Season Eight #6–10
2	Credits and full notes Writer(s) Penciller(s): Brian K. Vaughan; Joss Whedon; Georges Jeanty; Cliff Richards				Collects The reprinted material is, in whole or in part, from: Buffy the Vampire Slayer Season Eight #6–10
3	Wolves at the Gate	Dark Horse Comics	November 11, 2008	ISBN 1595821651	Collects The reprinted material is, in whole or in part, from: Buffy the Vampire Slayer Season Eight #11–15
3	Credits and full notes Writer(s) Penciller(s): Drew Goddard; Joss Whedon; Georges Jeanty				Collects The reprinted material is, in whole or in part, from: Buffy the Vampire Slayer Season Eight #11–15
4	Time of Your Life	Dark Horse Comics	May 6, 2009	ISBN 1595823107	Collects The reprinted material is, in whole or in part, from: Buffy the Vampire Slayer Season Eight #16–20
4	Credits and full notes Writer(s) Penciller(s): Jeph Loeb; Joss Whedon; Georges Jeanty; Karl Moline				Collects The reprinted material is, in whole or in part, from: Buffy the Vampire Slayer Season Eight #16–20
5	Predators and Prey	Dark Horse Comics	September 30, 2009	ISBN 1595823425	Collects The reprinted material is, in whole or in part, from: Buffy the Vampire Slayer Season Eight #21–25 and the short stories "Harmony Bites" and "Vampy Cat Play Friend" from MySpace Dark Horse Presents!
5	Credits and full notes Writer(s) Penciller(s): Jane Espenson; Steven S. DeKnight; Drew Z. Greenberg; Jim Krueger; Doug Petrie; Georges Jeanty; Cliff Richards				Collects The reprinted material is, in whole or in part, from: Buffy the Vampire Slayer Season Eight #21–25 and the short stories "Harmony Bites" and "Vampy Cat Play Friend" from MySpace Dark Horse Presents!
6	Retreat	Dark Horse Comics	February 25, 2010	ISBN 1595824154	Collects The reprinted material is, in whole or in part, from: Buffy the Vampire Slayer Season Eight #26–30 and the short stories "Always Darkest" and "Harmony Comes to the Nation" from MySpace Dark Horse Presents!
6	Credits and full notes Writer(s) Penciller(s): Jane Espenson; Joss Whedon; Georges Jeanty				Collects The reprinted material is, in whole or in part, from: Buffy the Vampire Slayer Season Eight #26–30 and the short stories "Always Darkest" and "Harmony Comes to the Nation" from MySpace Dark Horse Presents!
7	Twilight	Dark Horse Comics	October 6, 2010	ISBN 1595825584	Collects The reprinted material is, in whole or in part, from: Buffy the Vampire Slayer Season Eight #31–35 and the Willow one-shot.
7	Credits and full notes Writer(s) Penciller(s): Brad Meltzer; Joss Whedon; Georges Jeanty; Karl Moline				Collects The reprinted material is, in whole or in part, from: Buffy the Vampire Slayer Season Eight #31–35 and the Willow one-shot.
8	Last Gleaming	Dark Horse Comics	June 1, 2011	ISBN 1595826106	Collects The reprinted material is, in whole or in part, from: Buffy the Vampire Slayer Season Eight #36–40 and the Riley one-shot.
8	Credits and full notes Writer(s) Penciller(s): Joss Whedon; Scott Allie; Jane Espenson; Georges Jeanty; Karl Moline				Collects The reprinted material is, in whole or in part, from: Buffy the Vampire Slayer Season Eight #36–40 and the Riley one-shot.

Note: The full title of all volumes listed here start with "Buffy the Vampire Slayer Season Eight: ".

=== Library editions ===
The series has been collected into four deluxe, oversized, hardcover editions under the title "Buffy The Vampire Slayer Season Eight Library Edition", each containing ten issues and extra features.

Title	Release date	Publisher	Writers	Contains
Volume 1	May 30, 2012	Dark Horse Comics	Joss Whedon and Brian K. Vaughan	Season 8 issues 1–10, "Always Darkest", covers gallery, sketches gallery.
Volume 2	September 12, 2012	Dark Horse Comics	Joss Whedon, Drew Goddard, and Jeph Loeb	Season 8 issues 11–20, Willow: Goddesses and Monsters, covers gallery, sketches gallery.
Volume 3	January 8, 2013	Dark Horse Comics	Jane Espenson, Steven S. DeKnight, Drew Z. Greenberg, Jim Krueger, and Doug Petrie	Season 8 issues 21–30, covers gallery, sketches gallery.
Volume 4	March 20, 2013	Dark Horse Comics	Joss Whedon, Brad Meltzer, and Scott Allie	Season 8 issues 31–40; Riley: Commitment through Distance, Virtue through Sin; covers gallery, sketches gallery.

== Motion comics ==
Fox Home Entertainment produced motion comics based on the first 19 issues of Season Eight. The first motion comic was released on Amazon Video on Demand and iTunes on July 19, 2010, with new motion comics being released every Monday. The Region-1 Blu-ray and DVD of the motion comic series was released on January 4, 2011, and includes limited edition Jo Chen packaging and a collectible reprint of Dark Horse Comic's first book in the series. The Region-2 DVD was released on October 3, 2011.

== Reception ==
Initial reaction to Season Eight was generally positive, despite the switch in medium leading to comparison between the television series and the comic. Mathew Springer of The Comicbloc described the series as "very good ... and slightly strange." He praised Whedon's writing in the opening issue, claiming, "The humor, pop culture references and spot-on quirky characterizations are all on vibrant display," and looked forward to the direction the book was going in. However, he admitted that it was hard for him to accept the comic as canon, claiming "there's something subtly undermining this effort simply because it's a comic book and not on television." Mark Stoddard of Comix Nexus also approached the series "with some trepidation, unsure of whether there would be more great stories that really needed to be told, and wondering whether the magic of TV could be replicated in the medium of comics." TV Squad's Keith McDuffee expressed that reading Buffy as a comic book after seeing it on television for seven years was strange, but the new format was a good thing because, "You don't have ugly casting problems and the special effects budget isn't a concern at all." In a later review, he reaffirmed this opinion, stating, "Thank God for a medium that lets creativity go completely wild without budget worries."

Georges Jeanty's artwork received praise for being dynamic and true to the characters, rather than trying to appear photo-realistic. According to Mathew Springer, "He brings these people to life not as drawings of actors and actresses, but as fully realized comic book characters in their own right." Mark Stoddard complimented Whedon's choice of Jeanty for the book, saying, "His layouts and storytelling are clear, he handles the action sequences pretty well, and the character likenesses are excellent, retaining a sense of artistic individuality, rather than simply generating portraits or rehashing television stills." However, Keith McDuffee criticized Jeanty's work, feeling, "The cover images...are amazingly detailed and truly capture what we remember of the characters, but the inside pages have a bit to be desired." Richard George of IGN described Jeanty's work as bringing "a mixture of real life practicality and zany cartoons," but warned readers not to compare it to the "immaculate" covers by Jo Chen, explaining, "Do not expect the art inside to be what it is on the outside, and don't hold one against the other. Both styles have their place."

=== Reaction from original cast ===
Multiple cast members have commented on the appearances of the characters they originated for the TV series in the Season 8 comics.

- Sarah Michelle Gellar, who portrayed Buffy, was first informed of Buffy's lesbian experiences by Seth Green, who played Oz, in an on-camera interview, and expressed surprise and approval of the development.
- Nicholas Brendon, who portrayed Xander, mentioned the events of issue #12 in the Paley Center for Media Buffy cast reunion held March 20, 2008, to the obvious surprise of James Marsters and Sarah Michelle Gellar, later commenting, "He's looking good, rocking the eye patch in charge of 500 chicks. That is the one thing that Xander would be completely blown away about — being in charge of 500 slayers. Xander wasn't in charge of himself in the show!"
- Anthony Stewart Head, who played Rupert Giles, said, "I've seen bits of it and I'd love to see more because it's so cool. It's Joss — and I love Joss's writing. I haven't had a lot of time but I must get the whole season and check it out."
- Elizabeth Anne Allen, who portrayed Amy, described the series as "awesome," saying, "[Season Six/Seven] was fun.... but I really would have loved to play Amy in Season 8. She is much darker."

=== Awards ===
Group	Year	Award	Work	Result
Diamond Comic Distributors	2007	Comic Book of the Year, under $3.00	Issue #1	Won
Diamond Comic Distributors	2007	Licensed Comic of the Year	Issue #1	Won
Eisner Award	2008	Best Continuing Series		Nominated
Eisner Award	2008	Best New Series		Won
Nickelodeon Kids' Choice Awards	2008	Best Book		Nominated
Diamond Comic Distributors	2008	Licensed Comic Book of the Year	Issue #12	Won
GLAAD Media Awards 20th Annual	2009	Outstanding Comic Book	"Wolves at the Gate"	Won
Wizard Magazine Fan Awards 2009 (#211 Platinum Edition)	2009	Favorite Licensed Comic and Favorite Heroine	Buffy Summers	Won
Wizard Magazine	2009	Top 100 Graphic Novels of the Wizard Magazine Era	"Wolves at the Gate"	Placed #67
