= Buffy: The Animated Series =

Cancelled television series

- Promotional artwork
- Created by: Joss Whedon
- Starring: Giselle Loren; Alyson Hannigan; Nicholas Brendon; Charisma Carpenter; Anthony Stewart Head
- Country of origin: United States
- No. of episodes: Single 4-minute pilot Six+ scripts completed but unproduced

Production
- Running time: 4 minutes (pilot)

Original release
- Network: Fox (developed for)

Buffy: The Animated Series is an animated television series concept based on Buffy the Vampire Slayer created by Joss Whedon. Initially greenlit by 20th Century Fox in 2002, it went ultimately unproduced and unaired when no network was willing to buy the series. The series would have taken place in the middle of Buffy season 1, as writer Jeph Loeb described the continuity as "Episode 7.5". However, it would have included the retroactive addition of Buffy's younger sister Dawn, who was created in Buffy season 5 and retconned into the memories of everyone in Buffy's life.

Whedon and Loeb would later revisit the style of the series in the Season Eight comic story "After These Messages... We'll Be Right Back!".

== Production details ==
Development began on the show in 2001. Joss Whedon and Jeph Loeb were to be executive producers for the show, and most of the cast from Buffy would return to voice their characters. The series soon ran into problems. 20th Century Fox were going to produce the show, and it was initially planned that the show would air on Fox Kids, possibly as early as February 2002. When Fox Kids ceased operations, Fox shopped it to other networks. When no network was willing to purchase the series, production halted.

Two years later, in 2004, Fox once again showed an interest in developing and selling the show to another network. Various key actors, including Anthony Stewart Head, did voice work, and artwork was produced to make a four-minute presentation. That pilot was used to try to sell the series to a network. Once again no network was willing to take the risk of purchasing the show. Loeb explained that networks find the show difficult since it would be too adult to air with children's television, but not suitable to many people in a prime-time slot.

In a Q&A with The Hollywood Reporter on May 16, 2003, Whedon explained:

We just couldn't find a home for (it). We had a great animation director, great visuals, six or seven hilarious scripts from our own staff—and nobody wanted it. I was completely baffled. I felt like I was sitting there with bags of money and nobody would take them from me. It was a question of people either not wanting it or not being able to put up the money because it was not a cheap show. One thing I was very hard-line about was, I didn't want people to see it if it looked like crap. I wanted it to be on a level with Animaniacs or Batman: The Animated Series. And that's a little pricier. But I just don't think it's worth doing unless it's beautiful to look at as well as fun.

In an interview with TV Guide in September 2005, Whedon announced that the series was effectively dead.

== Writing and acting ==
=== Writing staff ===
- Jeph Loeb said that the series would have begun with the episode, "A Day in the Life" for which the script was completed by Loeb with Joss Whedon which "introduces the characters, sets up their dynamics and the show's premise."
- Loeb mentioned that one of the episodes revolved around "Buffy getting her driver's license but dealing with a demon driver's ed teacher."
- Jane Espenson wrote three scripts for the show: One of which was called "The Back Room", one was called "Lunch is Revolting!", and another called "Teeny". "Teeny" would have been about a shrunken Buffy.
- Espenson revealed that "Steve DeKnight and Drew Greenberg wrote episodes, if I recall. And I believe Doug Petrie did too. I think there was a story set aside for Rebecca Kirshner that she never got to start." Joss Whedon and Jeph Loeb wrote the pilot. She said there had been eight scripts written in all, although two were incomplete.

=== Episodes ===
Jeph Loeb revealed that there are thirteen scripts of the animated series.

- "A Day in the Life" (by Jeph Loeb and Joss Whedon)
- "Teeny" (by Jane Espenson)
- "Lunch is Revolting!" (by Jane Espenson)
- "The Back Room" (by Jane Espenson)
- "Say Yo" (by Steve DeKnight)
- Untitled completed episode script (by Drew Greenberg)
- Untitled completed episode script (by Doug Petrie)
- Untitled unstarted episode script (story set aside for Rebecca Kirshner)

=== Cast ===
- Giselle Loren as Buffy Summers
- Alyson Hannigan as Willow Rosenberg
- Nicholas Brendon as Xander Harris
- Anthony Stewart Head as Rupert Giles
- Charisma Carpenter as Cordelia Chase
- Michelle Trachtenberg as Dawn Summers
- Kristine Sutherland as Joyce Summers
- Armin Shimerman as Principal Snyder
- David Boreanaz as Angel

Sarah Michelle Gellar was not interested in returning to the role. Giselle Loren had already voiced Buffy in the Buffy video games, Buffy the Vampire Slayer and Chaos Bleeds.

== Leak ==
On August 1, 2008, the four-minute unaired presentation was leaked online via YouTube.

=== Support of members of the cast ===
On August 20, 2008, Nicholas Brendon said on his audiolog:

I know that there's been talk about the Buffy Animated Series. Which we did, gosh, like, three years ago. You know, to be quite honest with you, I don't know why it didn't go further, but I know that there's been a lot of hububaloo on the old YouTube there, and I checked it out and I almost got a little teary. You know, I hadn't seen Xander in a while, and it was kind of neat to kind of go back into that library and that into life, and all that stuff. But, yeah. So, listen, I'll go on the record by saying I would love to do an animated series for Buffy. That being said, I might be the only one. But, I'm not sure. I haven't had a chance to talk to anybody about it. So, you know, keep your fingers crossed.

On August 26, 2008, Jeph Loeb declared in an interview to MTV:

Everything still exists—the designs, the scripts. It's such a 'no-duh' project, so why the hell not? All you need is to draw it. Eight years ago, there was no fascination with Family Guy or Robot Chicken, but there's an audience now that could drive to it. You can't stand in the way of pop culture.

During the Buffy EW reunion in 2017, the cast remarked that one of the few ways they would consider returning to the world of Buffy would be the animated series, to which Sarah Michelle Gellar expressed interest. However, all agreed that a revival of the series would be dependent on Joss Whedon, who remarked that he had moved on from producing Buffy media for television.

== Quotes ==
Jane Espenson has revealed only two short extracts from the scripts on her website:

- Quote 1

Buffy realizes she's eaten her Mother's breakfast by mistake. She holds up the last bite of bagel and, instead of saying, "there's a bite left," she says:

BUFFY

There's a remnant.

- Quote 2

Buffy has just inappropriately used her Slayer-Strength on the volleyball court, so she vows to restrain herself:

BUFFY

Sure. Okay. I can hold back. Call me Dairy Queen, 'cuz here comes a soft serve.

(then)

Sorry, that was kinda lame.

== See also ==
- Undeveloped Buffy the Vampire Slayer spinoffs
