= Melaka Fray =

Fictional character in Buffy the Vampire Slayer comics

- Melaka Fray as seen on the cover of Fray #8 (August 2003); Art by Karl Moline and Andy Owens

Publication information
- Publisher: Dark Horse Comics
- First appearance: Fray #1 (June 2001)
- Created by: Joss Whedon (writer); Karl Moline (artist)
- Voiced by: Michelle Wong (Note: Michelle Wong voices the character for the motion comic adaptation of Buffy the Vampire Slayer Season Eight.)

In-story information
- Place of origin: Manhattan, New York
- Team affiliations: Slayers
- Partnerships: Buffy Summers
- Abilities: Supernatural strength, speed, stamina, and agility; Accelerated healing

Melaka Fray is a fictional character in the Buffy the Vampire Slayer comics published by Dark Horse Comics. She debuts in the first issue of Fray (2001), a limited series in a shared universe with the television show Buffy the Vampire Slayer. Living in the 23rd century, Melaka is a professional thief who learns that she is a Slayer destined to fight supernatural foes. She has a Slayer's physical powers, while her twin brother Harth inherited their prophetic dreams. Melaka discovers that Harth, who she believed was dead, has become a vampire intent on bringing demons back to Earth's dimension. After stopping his plan, she remains a thief, but chooses to protect others as well. In Tales of the Slayers, she connects with her heritage by reading journals about past Slayers. Melaka reappears in the canonical comic book continuation of the television series, meeting the 21st-century Slayer Buffy Summers in Season Eight and helping her defeat Harth in Season Twelve.

Melaka was developed by Buffy's creator Joss Whedon and artist Karl Moline. Whedon originally planned to write a comic about a different Slayer, Faith, but instead opted for a new character in a futuristic setting to avoid interfering with Faith's potential storylines. Fray was Whedon's first time writing a comic, although Dark Horse Comics had previously published Buffy comics without his involvement. His only request was that Melaka should not be drawn in the sexualized manner common with female characters in superhero comics. Although Melaka is initially characterized as tough, she is also shown as caring and protective of others. Her relationships with Harth and her older sister Erin are key parts of Fray.

Critics have had mixed reactions to Melaka in Fray. Some have praised her as a good protagonist, while others have criticized her relationships with other characters and capabilities as a strong female character. Moline's art has been the subject of critical discussion, as despite Whedon's intentions, some reviewers believed that the comic sexually objectifies Melaka. Academics have analyzed Melaka's character arc in Fray as an example of the hero's journey, with her last name also being examined based on its potential meanings. A fan film with Melaka was released in 2017.

== Storylines ==
=== Background ===
Melaka Fray first appears in the first issue of Fray (June 2001), which is a limited series published by Dark Horse Comics. The comic is set in a shared universe with Buffy the Vampire Slayer, a television series about Buffy Summers, who is a Slayer—a young woman destined to fight the "forces of darkness". A Slayer possesses supernatural strength, speed, stamina, and agility, as well as accelerated healing and prophetic dreams. She is trained and guided by a Watcher. While many women have the latent potential to be Slayers, there is usually only one active at a time. Buffy changes this in the series finale by having her best friend, the witch Willow Rosenberg, activate the powers of every unrealized Slayer. Melaka is from the 23rd century, two hundred years in Buffy's future, and she is the only Slayer active in her time period.

=== Fray ===
Melaka lives in Manhattan, which has been renamed to Haddyn. (Note: Whedon has said that Haddyn is a shortened form of Manhattan and that this type of language was commonly used in this world, explaining "everything's sort of shortened".) The Sun's radiation has mutated a portion of the population and their descendants, who are called "radies". People consider vampires a different type of these mutants, referring to them as "lurks". Melaka grew up in a poor area of Haddyn, often stealing food. She recognized as a teenager that she had supernatural strength, but casually attributed it to being simply her own natural skills. When she was fourteen, she took her twin brother Harth along for a robbery, in which he was seemingly killed by the vampire Icarus. Her older sister Erin blamed Melaka for Harth's death, and they become distant. While Erin became a police officer, Melaka continued to be involved with crime.

Now nineteen years old, Melaka has become a professional thief who works for the radie Gunther. She also looks after a young radie girl named Loo. A man calls Melaka "the chosen" before immolating himself; the same day, the demon Urkonn informs Melaka that she is a Slayer. He tells her about vampires and how, in the 21st century, a Slayer and her allies had banished all demons and magic from the Earth's dimension. Urkonn says that the man who had approached her was one of the Watchers, who have become insane zealots by the 23rd century. Melaka only has the physical powers associated with being a Slayer and never had prophetic dreams; for that reason, she initially does not believe that she is a Slayer, but later agrees to be trained by Urkonn.

When confronted by Icarus, Melaka is too afraid to fight, but is saved by Urkonn. She attempts to learn Icarus' whereabouts from Gunther, but he reluctantly sets her up to be arrested. Vampires ambush the police, kidnapping Melaka and taking her to their leader, who is revealed to be Harth. As Melaka's twin, Harth had inherited the Slayer's prophetic dreams instead of her. To survive being bitten by Icarus, he ingested the vampire's blood to turn into one. He used his instinctive knowledge to become the vampires' master. He plans to open a gateway to bring demons back to Earth's dimension, and reveals that he had Gunther hire Melaka to steal the items necessary to complete the ritual. After escaping, Melaka tells Erin everything that has happened, although Erin refuses to believe her. Melaka finds out that Loo was killed, which motivates her to wage war against the vampires.

Urkonn gives Melaka the scythe—an ancient Slayer weapon—to aid her in her upcoming battles. Despite an unsuccessful attempt to rally her community to take action, Melaka grows more confident in herself as a Slayer and hunts down vampires. This attracts Icarus' attention, but before the two can face off, Erin kills him by crashing her hovercar on top of him. Melaka and her community, along with Erin and several police officers, battle an army of vampires. While this is occurring, Harth resurrects a demon whose womb is an dimensional portal, but Melaka defeats her and Harth escapes. Following this, Gunther informs her that he was initially unaware of Harth's plan and explains that he turned her into the police to protect her. Melaka tells Urkonn that she knows he pushed her to fight by murdering Loo; she kills him, doing so swiftly and painlessly as she had considered him a friend. Melaka returns to her work as a thief, while also fighting vampires and vowing to protect her world from demons.

=== Other appearances ===
In the anthology comic Tales of the Slayers, Melaka finds an abandoned apartment with a library that has Watchers' diaries. By reading them, she feels less alone and more connected to past Slayers. By Buffy the Vampire Slayer Season Eight, she has moved into the apartment and is working with Erin to locate Harth, learning that he has teamed up with a madwoman. While checking out this lead, Melaka meets Buffy and the two fight until Buffy convinces her that they are allies. Buffy had traveled forward in time to investigate a temporal anomaly.

Melaka and Buffy look into reports of vampires in the exclusive, wealthier areas of Haddyn. They disagree on whether to intervene during a vampire attack on humans. Melaka wants to fight, while Buffy suggests tracking their movements. Melaka separates from her to slay the vampires and meets the madwoman, who is the future version of Willow. She convinces Melaka to prevent Buffy from returning to her own time, saying this would change the timeline and erase Melaka's reality. Buffy escapes through a temporal rift after being forced to kill Willow. Melaka and Erin realize that despite this, their world remains intact.

In Buffy the Vampire Slayer Season Twelve, Harth travels to the 21st century and organizes an army of demons. Buffy and her allies attempt to stop him, but when they are overwhelmed, they go to the future to recruit Melaka and Erin for the battle. Willow casts a spell to provide Buffy with the collective power of all active Slayers, which Harth intercepts and takes for himself. His body breaks down from the strain of this energy, and Melaka and Buffy kill him. With Harth's death, Melaka receives the memories of past Slayers. She returns to the 23rd century with Erin and finds it has improved dramatically. Gunther no longer recognizes Melaka, and a group of Slayers say that they have read about her in the Watchers' diaries. One of them tells her that she can find a home and a family in this version of the 23rd century.

== Development ==
=== Creation and design ===
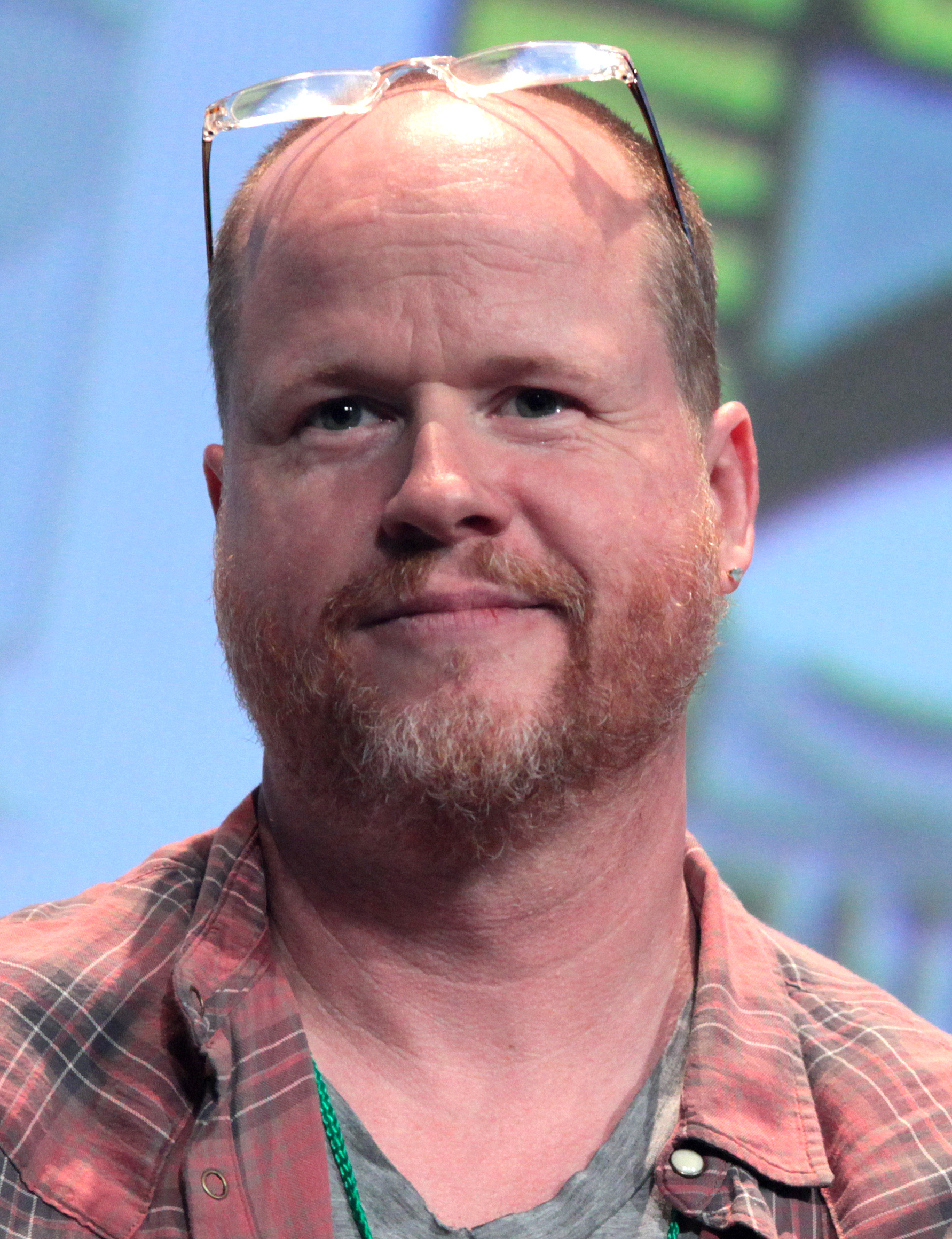
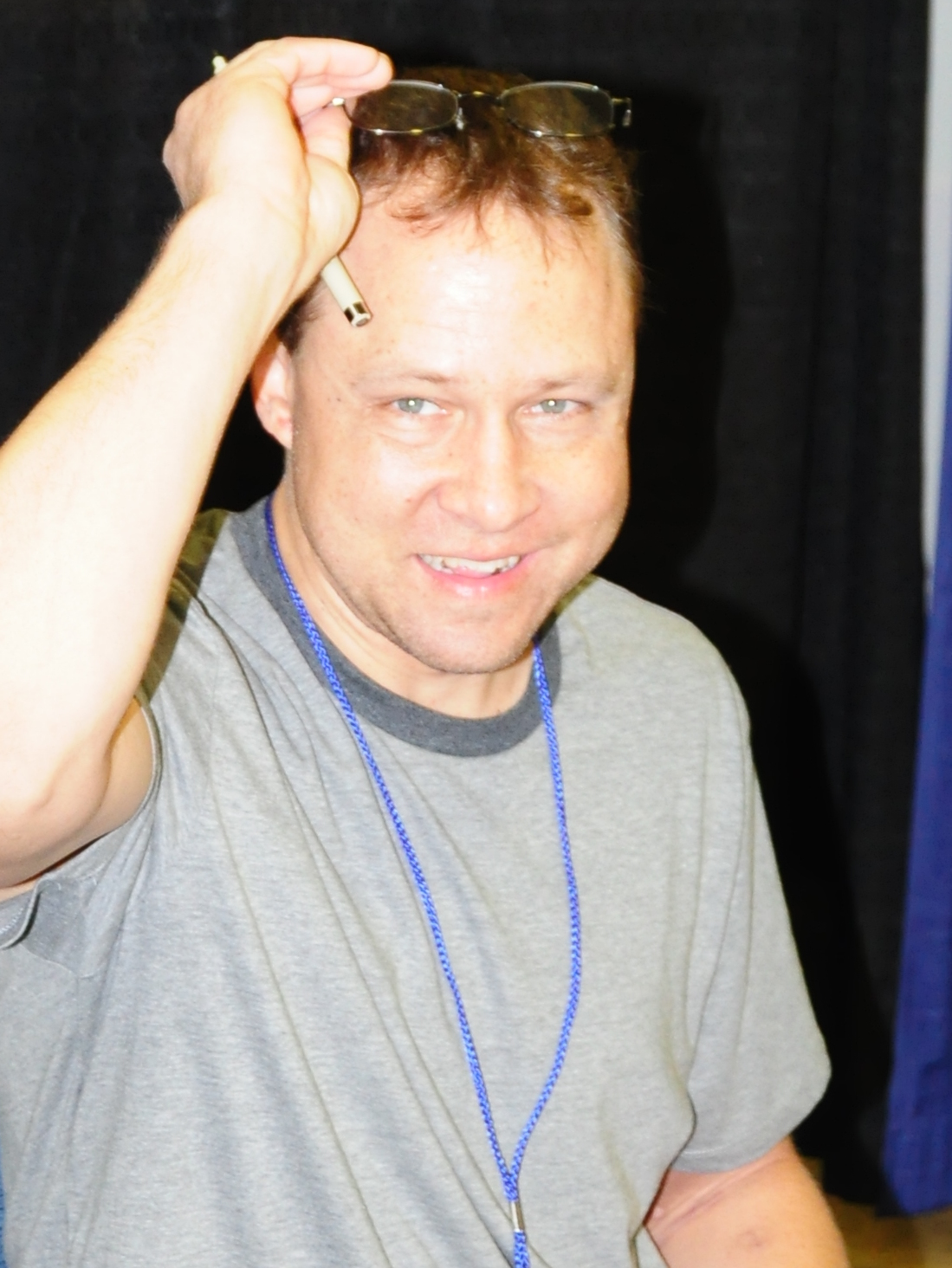
Melaka Fray was created by Joss Whedon (pictured in 2015) and Karl Moline (pictured in 2012).

Melaka Fray was developed by creator of the Buffy the Vampire Slayer television show Joss Whedon and artist Karl Moline. Prior to Fray, Dark Horse Comics had published Buffy the Vampire Slayer comics without any involvement from Whedon or the show's other writers. (Note: Fray is considered a part of the Buffyverse canon, while earlier Buffy comics, with the exception of The Origin, are not. Joss Whedon defined canon as a "demarcation between the creation and ancillary creations by different people".) As Whedon was developing Buffy's spinoff series Angel, he offered to write a tie-in comic for Dark Horse Comics; editor Scott Allie worked with him on ideas. Whedon considered writing about a different Slayer—Faith—but he did not want to interfere with her potential storylines on Angel, opting instead for a new character. He established Melaka as hailing from the future to keep her distinct from Buffy and related projects.

Whedon had a single demand for Dark Horse Comics—that there would be "no cheesecake, no giant silicone hooters, [and] no standing with her butt out in that bizarrely uncomfortable soft-core pose" with Melaka's character design. While promoting Fray in 2001, he discussed giving up 1990s comics, feeling that superhero comics oversexualized their female characters and were made to indulge power fantasies. Whedon worked closely with Moline for Melaka's appearance, wanting her to be a "real girl, with real posture, a slight figure", and a "distinctive face". According to Moline, Whedon pictured her as "both beautiful and modestly built" and as "more of an athlete than a supermodel, as most comic heroines tend to be". In early concept art, Moline modeled Melaka after Natalie Portman's appearance in the film Léon: The Professional (1994). Throughout Fray, Melaka is drawn wearing boots and baggy pants, as opposed to the dresses and heels worn by Buffy, being characterized as preferring function over style.

Moline drew Melaka for the entirety of her limited series and for her subsequent appearances in Tales of the Slayers and Buffy the Vampire Slayer Season Eight. Writer Ryan P. Donovan felt that for Season Eight, Moline adopted a similar style as Georges Jeanty—the principal artist of the series—for the "character designs and action sequences". Whedon and Allie had planned for Melaka's return in Season Eight during early stages of development, working on her story arc prior to the sale of the comic's first issue. Melaka was drawn by Jeanty for Buffy the Vampire Slayer Season Twelve, and Moline included her on his variant cover for the first issue. Christos Gage, one of the main writers for Season Twelve, has said that Whedon wanted a happy ending for Melaka; Gage believed that Whedon "wanted to present a future that was hopeful", especially "as our world gets more dystopian". According to Allie, Dark Horse Comics would use Melaka only if Whedon wrote her. In separate interviews, Whedon and Allie have said that there were no plans for an ongoing comic book, film, or television series about Melaka.

=== Characterization and relationships ===
Melaka is initially characterized as a street smart and rebellious criminal, but this behavior is shown throughout Fray to be her way of protecting herself in the bleakness of her world. She uses crime as a way to survive and accepts her life as hard but ordinary. Over the course of her series, Melaka is portrayed as kind, compassionate, willing to help others, and protective of her community; these characteristics are presented as unusual in her world and something that makes her stand apart. Moreover, Season Eight depicts Melaka as focused on saving individuals, in opposition to Buffy who is more concerned about bigger picture issues. While Melaka is shown as confident in her abilities, she has feelings of self-hatred and guilt over her past actions regarding Harth. Whedon described Melaka as "hard, defensive, vulnerable, goofy, and yes, wicked sexy" and identified her as a "cool girl hero". He said that he enjoyed writing female characters like Melaka, who he called "hard-edged but heroic", because he was drawn to "the people nobody takes seriously, having been one the greater part of my life".

Melaka starts her series alone and disconnected from her family and past Slayers. Her issues with her siblings are prominent storylines throughout Fray. Melaka and her sister Erin have different ways of handling their world, and are portrayed as opposites: as the bad girl and criminal and the good girl and cop, respectively. Estranged from her biological family, Melaka creates a community of her own, being especially protective of Loo. She trusts Urkonn, who trains her in a similar fashion to a traditional Watcher, and views him as a friend. At the end of Fray, Melaka begins working on her relationship with Erin, and they are shown to be closer by Season Eight. She also finds a way to connect with past Slayers in Tales of the Slayers through reading the Watchers' diaries.

== Themes and analysis ==
=== Hero's journey ===
Scholars have analyzed Melaka's character arc over the course of Fray. Author K. Dale Koontz argued that Melaka goes through the hero's journey, a concept popularized by mythologist Joseph Campbell, and broke her story into three stages: "the departure, the initiation and the return". Koontz wrote that the "departure" occurs when Melaka learns and initially does not believe that she is a Slayer, with the "initiation" culminating when she is able stop Hart's plan, despite facing challenges. According to Koontz, the "return" happens when Melaka kills Urkonn and uses her new skills and knowledge to protect others.

Koontz and writer Valerie Estelle Frankel have discussed how Whedon used and modified the hero's journey for Melaka. Both highlighted that Fray had not provided Melaka with a definite resolution, as Harth's fate and Melaka's incomplete Slayer powers remain unresolved. Koontz writes that an incomplete resolution is typical of Whedon, while Frankel suggests that Melaka is "poised for many more adventures". (Note: Koontz and Frankel wrote their analyses prior to Melaka receiving a resolution to her storylines with Buffy the Vampire Slayer Season Twelve in 2018.) Koontz interpreted that like most of Whedon's works, Melaka's arc in Fray ends with a reflection on how "gaining knowledge is often a painful process, but it's a journey well worth taking". Frankel argued that by moving into the apartment with the Watchers' library, Melaka acts more as a heroine, who typically "finds herself bonding with a place as her tool: her city, headquarters or house", rather than as a traditional male hero.

=== Name and characterization ===
Academics have had varying interpretations of Melaka's last name. Koontz noted that Fray could have a dual meaning, either referring to a battle or to the act of falling apart. Scholar Amy E. Clayton has argued that while it could be read as to fight or to attack, other definitions could be applied to the word as well, such as an undoing, a feeling of fear, to bruise, or to deflower.

Clayton did not consider Melaka to be a strong female character. She reasoned that since Melaka had only half of her Slayer powers, with the rest taken by the male Harth, she was unable to "be as strong a feminist character" as Buffy. Clayton criticized Melaka for her lack of agency, pointing out her working for the male Gunther, being given the scythe rather than finding it, and not being the one to kill Icarus. She noted that although Melaka seems like a tomboy, she is "tamed" by the end of Fray, which instead depicts her as a "mature female, ready to protect and serve others". Clayton argued that through this shift, Melaka changes into a woman who must "appease the desire of men in order to find a fulfilling life" and that by becoming a Slayer, she loses her more masculine identity in favor of a feminine motivation to "mother the human race".

== Reception ==
Karl Moline became well-known for his art for Fray and stated in 2011 that Melaka was the character that people requested the most for a sketch. Members of the Loyola Marymount University's film school ran a Kickstarter campaign in 2013 to crowdfund a fan film called Lurk, which would feature Melaka. On Kickstarter, the organizers described adapting the character for live action as a "natural progression and the perfect opportunity to make something cool for the fandom". It was released in 2017, which was the 20th anniversary of Buffy the Vampire Slayer's series premiere ("Welcome to the Hellmouth"). Melaka was played by Stephanie Woodburn, a host of the YouTube channel Geek and Sundry.

Some critics have enjoyed Melaka's characterization in Fray. School Library Journal's Susan Salpini considered her the "heart and power" of the comic, describing her as a likable protagonist. Kelly Thompson of Comic Book Resources called Melaka a "great introductory character" as readers could learn about the Buffy mythology alongside her. In PopMatters, Patrick Shand praised that Melaka had a personality and story separate and distinct from Buffy's. Other reviewers have been more critical of Melaka in Fray. Sequart Organization's Matt Martin believed that she was too similar to Buffy. In the same publication, Ian Dawe dismissed Melaka's relationship with Erin as cliché and her decision to kill Urkonn as short-sighted.

Some reviewers have felt Moline's art for Fray sexually objectifies Melaka, who is shown with her knees spread on the first issue's cover and her legs open in its opening two-page spread. Clayton and film scholar Wendy Sterba acknowledged and praised Whedon's statement to avoid sexualizing female characters, but they did not believe this was executed properly. Sterba argued that aside from these initial instances, the rest of the comic did not sexualize Melaka, while Clayton took note of the characters' nudity in a shower sequence from Fray #4 (October 2001), which she described as gratuitous. Clayton wrote that although Whedon hoped to change how comics represent women, he still created unrealistic expectations for female readers; she considered the process of writing and developing Melaka a "misogynistic act in that she is crafted to match an appropriately modest yet sexy ideal". In a more positive review, Paste's Hillary Brown felt that Moline largely avoided sexualizing Melaka.
