= Predators and Prey =

Story arc in Buffy the Vampire Slayer Season Eight

- Cover of Buffy the Vampire Slayer Season Eight: Predators and Prey trade paperback collected edition Art by Jo Chen
- Publisher: Dark Horse Comics
- Genre: Action/adventure, horror; Based on Buffy the Vampire Slayer; Vampire
- Title(s): Buffy the Vampire Slayer Season Eight #21–25
- Main characters: Buffy Summers; Willow Rosenberg; Dawn Summers; Xander Harris; Andrew Wells

Creative team
- Writer(s): Jane Espenson, Steven S. DeKnight, Drew Z. Greenberg, Jim Krueger, Doug Petrie
- Penciller(s): Georges Jeanty, Cliff Richards (Safe)
- Inker: Andy Owens
- Colorist: Michelle Madsen

With respect to the Buffy the Vampire Slayer franchise
- The material covered in this article is a continuity issue in the canon of Buffy the Vampire Slayer.

"Predators and Prey" is the fifth story arc that spreads from the twenty-first to the twenty-fifth issue of the Buffy the Vampire Slayer Season Eight series of comic books, a continuation of the television series of the same name. The arc is written by Jane Espenson, Steven S. DeKnight, Drew Z. Greenberg, Jim Krueger, Doug Petrie.

== Plot ==
=== "Harmonic Divergence" (Issue #21) ===
In California, paparazzi witness Harmony Kendall drinking blood from a celebrity's neck outside a hot spot nightclub. Tabloids publish the photo of the biting, causing a world-wide stir of interest in vampires. Harmony uses this recent popular culture to land her own reality TV show with MTV. Soledad, a gang member, receives Slayer powers just in time to rescue herself from her old gang. She then turns down Andrew Wells and his offer to join the other Slayers, not wanting to join another gang.

Despite this, she tracks down Harmony and attempts to slay her during a taping of the reality show 'Harmony Bites'. Soledad loses and is killed, which just increases the popularity of the show and the negative public image the Slayers now have.

=== "Swell" (Issue #22) ===
Satsu and Kennedy investigate the results of a four armed demon's theft. It had been trying to steal the prototype of a 'Vampy Cat Play Friend' toy, which was produced by the Santorio Corporation. The two also argue for the real reason Buffy sent Kennedy to Satsu.

The doll turns out to be a living entity and turns Satsu into a caricature of a geisha, who mocks Kennedy's sexuality. Confused, the two manage to slay the creature.

Investigating the company building, they find the staff dead and sucked dry of all bodily fluids. A shipment of Vampy Cat dolls is headed for Scotland, the Slayer's main HQ. The shipment is boarded and destroyed, with the assistance of a sub now under Slayer control. The creatures praise Twilight, a recurring villain, before their destruction.

Harmony Kendall uses the incident to decry the 'backlash' against vampires.

=== "Predators and Prey" (Issue #23) ===
At the Scotland Slayer base, Andrew informs Buffy, Xander, and Willow that he has found Nisha, the lieutenant of the rogue Slayers led by Simone Doffler, outside of Milan. Nisha has been snared in a Ragna Spider's demon nest, so Buffy immediately arranges that she and Andrew head off to confront Nisha. However, when she is confronted, Nisha reveals that Andrew is responsible for breeding the extinct Ragna Spider demon back into existence, though with exceptional genetic modifications. As Andrew frees Nisha, he tries to defend his actions; as he and Buffy argue, Simone arrives by teleportation. Buffy is unsuccessful with convincing Simone to return with her and Simone teleports herself, Nisha, and the Ragna Spider away to an undisclosed location.

As Buffy and Andrew track Simone via the radioactive isotopes Andrew equipped in the Ragna Spider, Buffy acknowledges that Andrew has come a long way and matured, but should have handled the situation differently, even if he feels responsible for Simone's rebellion. They locate Simone in an opera house on a coastal island, where Simone traps them and reveals she wants Andrew for the Ragna Spider; she wants revenge on him because he was her Watcher. However, Buffy engages and bests Simone in a fencing duel instead, which Simone responds to by pulling out a gun. Buffy surrenders, telling Simone that she can keep the Ranga Spider and that Buffy will leave her alone so long as Simone lets Buffy walk away with Andrew. However, before Simone can shoot, the Italy Squad arrives to rescue them. Buffy takes Simone's gun and shoots the Ragna Spider's cage, setting the demon loose on rogue Slayers while the Italy Squad evacuates. Back at their base of operations, Buffy tells Andrew that he should feel proud of what he has accomplished and how he was willing to lay down his life for the innocent and greater good. Andrew apologizes to Buffy for lying, and Buffy tells him to get used to screwing up for good reasons, he's part of the family.

=== "Safe" (Issue #24) ===
Faith and Giles rescue an untrained Slayer named Courtney who had run away from her squad. Courtney informs them she was heading for a so-called Slayer Sanctuary in Hanselstadt, a safe zone for Slayers who do not wish to be chosen.

The trio travel to the town, noting disturbing incidents. Vampires congregate on the border, obviously not invading for fear of the sanctuary, and the town seems to have no children. Giles hooks up with a former Watcher named Duncan Fillworthe while the Slayers go to the Sanctuary. Giles discovers that Duncan has gone mad and fed the children of the town to the demon that inhabits the seeming Sanctuary. Since the vampires fear the demon, the townspeople are convinced that the demon is a guardian of the town and willingly sacrificed children to the demon in exchange for keeping away the vampires. After all the children in the town had been fed to the demon, Duncan turned to feeding it the runaway Slayers.

Giles saves Faith and Courtney from the threat, a monster that kills via the person's regrets. Duncan, who had followed, is killed when he regrets his complicity in the deaths. The vampires outside of town, now knowing the way is seemingly clear, mass for an attack. Giles and the Slayers swiftly organize an opposing army of adults.

=== "Living Doll" (Issue #25) ===
While the Summers sisters' relationship is still strained, Dawn goes missing as Buffy prepares the Slayer army against a vampire splinter army led by Judas Cradle. However, the ensuing battle ends quickly since Cradle's army consists of only six people and Buffy and Xander focus their attention on finding Dawn in the woods. To ascertain Dawn's possible whereabouts, Xander arranges for Andrew to find Dawn's thricewise ex-boyfriend Kenny at the University of California, Berkeley. Andrew poses as a college student interested in becoming Kenny's new roommate and sets up totems in Kenny's room that allow Willow to teleport the entire contents of Kenny's room to Scotland. However, when Kenny is confronted, he transforms into his demonic aspect and escapes into the nearby forest.

Meanwhile, Dawn has undergone a third transformation - she has become a doll - and has been captured by Geppetto-like elderly man. Despite Dawn's attempts to escape, she is held back by other dolls made by the man, whom the dolls consider their father. The dollmaker tries to console Dawn by revealing he asked the other dolls to keep her from escaping to prevent her from breaking herself open and spilling her soul. Buffy and Xander eventually find the dollmaker's cottage, but Xander is soon rendered unconscious by poisoned darts and Buffy is assaulted by woodland creatures. Dawn makes another failed attempt to escape and as she cries out for Buffy to save her, Kenny bursts into the dollmaker's cottage. Upon seeing Kenny, Dawn apologizes to him, which reverses the effects of the spell, allowing her to become a human again. After Buffy threatens the dollmaker for detaining Dawn, she decides to leave him alone when his dolls intervene on his behalf. Dawn and Kenny talk about what happened between them and they both apologize for their actions, making amends and parting ways. Dawn reconciles with Buffy, who apologizes for not being there enough for her and that though she may have a thousand Slayers to lead, she only has one sister she loves.

== Production and writing ==
Each individual issue was written by a different writer and each issue has a title instead of the overall story arc title. The story arc is a very loose one compared to the previous ones and each issue involves certain characters' point of view of the over-all plot.

== Canonical issues ==
This series has been described as "canon" by both Whedon and various commentators. As the creator of Buffy, Joss Whedon's association with Buffyverse story is often linked to how canonical the various stories are. Since Whedon is writing this story, it will be seen as a continuation of the official continuity established by Buffy and Angel.

Season Eight contradicts and supersedes information given in the paperback novels set after Season Seven, such as Queen of the Slayers and Dark Congress, which are described as being set in an unofficial "parallel continuity".

== Companion stories ==
- The first two issues have both had two online companion stories as well. "Harmonic Divergence" included a segment from Harmony's reality TV show, Harmony Bites. "Swell" had a companion comic which acted as a televised advert to promote the Vampy Cats featured in the issue.

Preceded by "After These Messages... We'll Be Right Back!"	Buffy the Vampire Slayer Season Eight storylines 2009	Succeeded by "Retreat"
