= Anywhere but Here (Buffy comic) =

- Cover of Buffy the Vampire Slayer Season Eight: Anywhere but Here; Art by Jo Chen
- Publisher: Dark Horse Comics
- Publication date: January 2008
- Genre: Action/adventure, horror; Based on Buffy the Vampire Slayer; Vampire
- Title(s): Buffy the Vampire Slayer Season Eight #10
- Main characters: Buffy Summers; Willow Rosenberg; Xander Harris; Dawn Summers; Kennedy

Creative team
- Writer: Joss Whedon
- Artist: Cliff Richards

With respect to the Buffy the Vampire Slayer franchise
- The material covered in this article is a continuity issue in the canon of Buffy the Vampire Slayer.

"Anywhere but Here" is the tenth issue of the Buffy the Vampire Slayer Season Eight series of comic books, a continuation from the television series of the same name. It is written by Joss Whedon.

== Plot ==
Threatened by Twilight's rising, Willow and Buffy fly under Willow's magical power to question a demon named Sephrilian (one of the Old Ones) about the matter. During their flight, they play a game called "Anywhere But Here" in which they detail their personal fantasies. When Buffy questions Willow about Kennedy's whereabouts, Willow avoids the question just as they finally arrive at the lair that resembles an old cottage. They are greeted by Robin, a Minder, who stabilizes reality around the hut, which is made unstable by the presence of Sephrilian. She warns Willow not to use magic inside and informs Buffy to "rescue the prince," much to their confusion. The two enter the lair and find themselves set on a never ending staircase.

At the castle, Xander surprises the giant-sized Dawn with a gift: her trunk full of clothes and articles enlarged to fit her. Amongst her possessions, Xander comes across a picture of regular-sized Dawn with her ex-boyfriend Kenny. Dawn finally reveals to Xander that she never slept with Kenny like she had informed everyone. She had in fact slept with his college roommate. Xander comforts her saying that she's only guilty of being human. He asks if she feels better getting it off her chest. She doesn't respond.

Buffy and Willow meet Sephrilian, a demon that has the ability to walk between worlds, in order to determine what Twilight signifies. Sephrilian replies: "The death of magic;" he claims that their fear is "sickeningly sweet," as Twilight represents the triumph of humans over demons, the end of the Hellmouths, and that this will be Buffy's life's work achieved. Sephrilian grows impatient with the human natural propensity to lie and hide from reality, and decides to send Buffy and Willow through a series of visions revealing past and future events.

In the first vision, Buffy and Willow find themselves looking on as Buffy and other Slayers rob a Swiss Bank Account for their personal funds, several months ago. Willow explains to Buffy that this is what the government feared: Slayers acting above the law. As a result of Buffy's desire to see the bad things Willow has done, a brief scene from the past reveals Willow intimately involved with a Nāga-like snake woman that granted her mystical knowledge.

Afterward, they are joined by an image of Robin in a new setting: Buffy on the floor of a foggy stone room, beaten, cut, and crying. Robin says she didn't expect Sephrilian to show them this, and explains that the scene shows a betrayal by "the closest and most unexpected." She senses that Buffy and Willow are about to cause a disruption and leaves. When Buffy asks Willow if Willow is the betrayer, she gives an evasive answer that is supplemented by a vision where Willow and Kennedy were arguing and Willow eventually confessed that she blames herself for Tara's death and Sunnydale's deterioration. Willow explained that while she and Tara could have left Sunnydale and lived happily, she could not bring herself to either let Buffy stay dead or desert her after her resurrection. She is determined to avoid the same thing happening to Kennedy. Buffy witnesses the revelation in disbelief.

Suddenly, Sephrilian returns and informs them that he welcomes the upcoming war, saying he now knows their weaknesses and that he plans to tell the rest of the demon world. Buffy attacks, and Willow conjures her a magical sword to quickly defeat the demon, but because she performed magic the lair explodes as the unstable reality field around it collapses. However, Robin contains the blast and magically rebuilds the hut within seconds. She thanks them for killing Sephrilian and giving her a temporary reprieve from her duties, and asks what happened in there. Buffy explains "It was demons. Playing games," and she and Willow walk away in silence.

== Production ==
=== Writing and artwork ===
Joss Whedon returns as writer for the first time since "The Chain". Cliff Richards joins the team as penciller, replacing the series' regular Georges Jeanty for this issue. Although this is Richard's first issue penciling for Buffy Season Eight, he has previously worked on past Buffy comics including "Slayer, Interrupted", "Play with Fire", and "Jonathan". "Anywhere but Here" is 25 pages as opposed to its usual 22, as stated in the letters column of issue 9.

=== Dark Horse contest ===
Dark Horse Comics held a contest for one reader to be given a cameo shot in Buffy. The winner was Robin Balzer, who had an entry written on her behalf by her husband, Jerrod. The essay was the couple watching Buffy and sharing it together at the beginning of the onset of Robin's schizophrenia.

Upon reading the winner's entry, Whedon decided to expand that character's role and feature her as a critical part of the story, as opposed to a simple cameo. She appears in this issue as well as on the variant cover with Buffy and Willow.

== Canonical issues ==
This series has been described as 'canon' by both Whedon and various commentators. As the creator of Buffy, Joss Whedon's association with Buffyverse story is often linked to how canonical the various stories are. Since Whedon is writing this story, it will be seen as a continuation of the official continuity established by Buffy and Angel.

Season Eight contradicts and supersedes information given in the paperback novels set after Season Seven, such as Queen of the Slayers and Dark Congress, which are described as being set in an unofficial "parallel" continuity.

== Timing ==
- Intended to be set after BtVS's seventh season. The precise timing of this arc is currently uncertain.

Preceded by "No Future for You"	Buffy the Vampire Slayer Season Eight storylines 2008	Succeeded by "A Beautiful Sunset"
