= The Chain (Buffy comic) =

- Cover of Buffy the Vampire Slayer Season Eight: The Chain; Art by Jo Chen
- Publisher: Dark Horse Comics
- Publication date: July 2007
- Genre: Action/adventure, horror; Based on Buffy the Vampire Slayer; Vampire
- Title(s): Buffy the Vampire Slayer Season Eight #5
- Main character: Buffy decoy

Creative team
- Writer: Joss Whedon
- Artist: Paul Lee
- Inker: Andy Owens
- Colorist: Dave Stewart

With respect to the Buffy the Vampire Slayer franchise
- The material covered in this article is a continuity issue in the canon of Buffy the Vampire Slayer.

"The Chain" is the fifth issue of the Buffy the Vampire Slayer Season Eight series of comic books, a continuation of the television series of the same name. It is written by creator Joss Whedon. It is dedicated to the late Janie Kleinman, a network executive whom Whedon worked with and admired.

== Plot ==
"The Chain" focuses on one of the Slayers used by Buffy Summers as a decoy to fool her enemies. The comic is a standalone issue, and features no appearances from Buffy herself, although season seven characters Andrew Wells, Rupert Giles, Vi, and Rona play small roles. The story is told through parallel narratives, showing the Slayer's calling, assignment as a Buffy decoy, and death.

The story itself is largely narrated by the Buffy decoy. An unnamed Potential Slayer, she is activated during the events of "Chosen". She is violently thrown on her back by the calling but then saves the lives of her schoolmates with her newfound powers. After seeing a commercial on local television starring Andrew and Vi, the girl finds the Slayer organization and "the chain" to which all Slayers are connected. While fighting vampires with a squad of Slayers, the narrator intervenes to save a fellow Slayer and is bitten by a vampire. Squad leader Rona identifies the Slayer as a candidate to serve as a Buffy decoy in an underground society of demons, monsters, and faeries. The girl is ultimately killed by the demon she was sent to deter, Yamanh, who is proud to have slain Buffy Summers. Following her demise, other Slayers drop in to dispose of Yamanh and his followers, who are engaged in battle with the underground clans of faeries, slugs, raven-like demons, and a "leafblower" type looking mystical creature that the decoy had united against Yamanh. The narrator's final thoughts suggest she is happy to have saved the world and been part of "the chain", even if her own name will never be known.

== Production ==
Editor Scott Allie describes "The Chain" as an important story: "Joss put a lot into this one. If it were an episode of the show, he would have directed it."

Paul Lee penciled the issue, proceeding Georges Jeanty, who returns the following issue. In one panel, Lee depicted past Slayers such as the First Slayer, the Righteous Slayer, Naayéé'neizgháni the Navajo Slayer, Nikki Wood, Elizabeth "Edward" Weston, Anni Sonnenblume, and the Chinese Slayer. In the same panel, season one villain The Master appears in the background along with a Turok-Han.

== Reception ==
In a review by The Harvard Independent, "The Chain" received particular praise for "creating webs of complex and intellectually stimulating meaning" using the medium of comics. Comics Bulletin wrote: "[...] a magnificent comic book, and in my opinion, Dark Horse's best and the best in the series thus far.

== Canonical issues ==
This series has been described as 'canon' by both Whedon and various commentators. As the creator of Buffy, Joss Whedon's association with Buffyverse story is often linked to how canonical the various stories are. Since Whedon is writing this story, it will be seen as a continuation of the official continuity established by Buffy and Angel.

Season Eight contradicts and supersedes information given in the paperback novels set after Season Seven, such as Queen of the Slayers and Dark Congress, which are described as being set in an unofficial "parallel" continuity.

== Timing ==
- Intended to be set after Buffy's seventh season. The timing is uncertain. It is possibly set sometime after "The Long Way Home", part 1 as Buffy refers to her decoy as alive, although Rona intimates that her existence is somewhat secretive and therefore the fact that she is dead may not have ever reached Buffy.

Preceded by "The Long Way Home"	Buffy the Vampire Slayer Season Eight storylines 2007	Succeeded by "No Future for You"
