= Fray (comics) =

US comic book limited series

Publication information
- Publisher: Dark Horse Comics
- Format: Limited series
- Publication date: 2001–2003
- No. of issues: 8
- Main character: See "Characters"

Creative team
- Created by: Joss Whedon; Karl Moline
- Written by: Joss Whedon
- Penciller: Karl Moline
- Inker: Andy Owens

Fray is an eight-issue comic book limited series, a futuristic spin-off of the television series Buffy the Vampire Slayer. Written by Buffy creator Joss Whedon, the series follows a Slayer named Melaka Fray, a chosen one in a time when vampires (called "lurks") are returning to the slums of New York City, and the rich-poor divide is even greater. Volume one is drawn by Karl Moline (pencils) and Andy Owens (inks).

The series was published by Dark Horse Comics beginning in 2001, with delays between the first six and the final two issues caused by Whedon's TV commitments, and Moline's divided commitments illustrating Route 666 for CrossGen Comics. After the series' conclusion in August 2003, a trade paperback collecting the whole series was also published by Dark Horse. In a short video promoting the charity Equality Now Joss Whedon confirmed that "Fray is not done, Fray is coming back. More than that, I will not say." This was reiterated in 2007's Comic Con when Whedon stated that he "absolutely would be returning to that world." Fray next appears as a main character in the 2008 Buffy the Vampire Slayer Season Eight crossover story arc, "Time of Your Life", by Whedon and Moline.

The series was closely linked to the concurrently airing seventh season of Buffy, with coinciding depictions of the Slayer's mystical scythe and her origins, a major contributor to the expansion of the canonical "Buffyverse" in which Buffy the Vampire Slayer and other related stories are set. Melaka Fray also appears in the story "Tales", by the same creative team as the series, in the anthology comic book Tales of the Slayers.

== Characters ==
- Melaka "Mel" Fray – A 19-year-old thief and Vampire Slayer. Unlike other Slayers, she has had no prophetic dreams of her destiny or of the Slayers before her and is now trying to figure out what her destiny as the Slayer entails.
- Harth Fray – Mel's twin brother, who was attacked by a vampire during a theft with Mel. To save his life, Harth deliberately drank the vampire's blood, thereby becoming a vampire himself. It is unprecedented for a Slayer to have a twin and, as an odd side-effect of this, Harth possesses the prophetic dreams and visions of past Slayers that Mel lacks.
- Erin Fray – Mel's older sister. On opposing sides already because of her job as a cop and Melaka's thieving, Erin also blamed Mel for the death of their brother for a long time. Eventually, in the big battle against their vampire brother, the two reconciled.
- Urkonn – A demon who trains Mel as a Slayer in lieu of her actual Watcher (who instead immolates himself). A budding friendship grows from the previously harsh mentor-student relationship, but he ultimately betrays her by killing Loo in order to harden her resolve. After defeating her brother, Mel discovers Urkonn's betrayal and lures him into a trap, killing him.
- Loo – Mel's friend, a mutated girl, murdered by Urkonn in order to motivate Melaka in confronting her brother.
- Icarus – The vampire that killed Harth four years ago; killed by Erin right before the big battle.

== Synopsis ==
The story is about a Vampire Slayer of the future named Melaka Fray and her discovery of what being a Slayer means.

Centuries have passed since the last Slayer was called. Demons were banished from the Earth at some point in the 21st century by an unnamed Slayer and her friends, and the Watchers' Council has decayed into a group of crazed fanatics. The vampires (dubbed lurks) have now returned and haunt the city. To combat this threat, a new Slayer is called: a professional thief named Melaka Fray. With the Watchers' Council ineffective, a group of "neutral" demons send the demon Urkonn to prepare Melaka for the war that is sure to come.

Although training hard and feeling confident, Mel finds herself out of her depth when she fights the vampire Icarus. Years before, Icarus severely injured Mel and killed her twin brother, Harth. Mel discovers that Harth was not actually killed: after being bitten by Icarus, he bit back and fed off the vampire, becoming a vampire himself. Since he was the Slayer's twin, he has the visions and instinctive knowledge that should have been hers: he knew what Mel is long before she did, and also knew how to become a vampire.

Disheartened, Mel refuses to fight, until she discovers the body of her young friend, a girl named Loo, with her neck snapped. Determined to avenge her, Mel rallies the inhabitants of the slums to fight against the vampires. Police officer Erin Fray (Mel's older sister) convinces some of the local law enforcement to also join in the crusade.

As the battle begins, a giant dragon-like demon flies over the scene. This, Urkonn tells Mel, is the gateway to the demon world, and thousands more demons will be born from its womb. Mel falls into the creature's mouth, and manages to kill it from inside by stabbing its brain. She climbs out of the creature's eye and again encounters Harth, who is riding on its back. His plans foiled, he kisses her on the mouth, and flees.

The world is safe, but one more piece of business remains. Mel tells Urkonn that she knows a vampire couldn't have killed Loo: they couldn't have got into her flat uninvited, and would have drained her blood, not snapped her neck. Therefore, Urkonn must have done it, hoping to inspire her to fight. He admits the truth, and they battle. Having figured out that her demon mentor can't swim, Melaka drops him into a pool of water and stabs him in the head.

Melaka returns to her former life of crime, while at the same time killing any lurks she finds. In another world, Urkonn's superiors state that he will be stricken from history for his failure to kill her after she stopped Harth, and start to discuss their plans for when Harth tries something again.

== Bibliography ==
=== Original issues ===
- Whedon, Joss (w), Moline, Karl (p), Owens, Andy (i), Stewart, Dave (col), Madsen, Michelle (let), Allie, Scott (ed). "Chapter One: Big City Girl" Fray, no. 1 (June 1, 2001). Dark Horse Comics. (Second printing: July 25, 2001)
- Whedon, Joss (w), Moline, Karl (p), Owens, Andy (i), Stewart, Dave (col), Madsen, Michelle (let), Allie, Scott (ed). "Chapter Two: The Calling" Fray, no. 2 (July 4, 2001). Dark Horse Comics. (Second printing: December 26, 2001)
- Whedon, Joss (w), Moline, Karl (p), Owens, Andy (i), Stewart, Dave (col), Madsen, Michelle (let), Allie, Scott (ed). "Chapter Three: Ready, Steady..." Fray, no. 3 (August 1, 2001). Dark Horse Comics. (Second printing: December 26, 2001)
- Whedon, Joss (w), Moline, Karl (p), Owens, Andy (i), Stewart, Dave (col), Madsen, Michelle (let), Allie, Scott (ed). "Chapter Four: Out of the Past" Fray, no. 4 (October 17, 2001). Dark Horse Comics. (Second printing: October 17, 2001)
- Whedon, Joss (w), Moline, Karl (p), Owens, Andy (i), Stewart, Dave (col), Madsen, Michelle (let), Allie, Scott (ed). "Chapter Five: The Worst of It" Fray, no. 5 (December 5, 2001). Dark Horse Comics. (Second printing: December 5, 2001)
- Whedon, Joss (w), Moline, Karl (p), Owens, Andy (i), Stewart, Dave (col), Madsen, Michelle (let), Allie, Scott (ed). "Chapter Six: Alarums" Fray, no. 6 (March 27, 2002). Dark Horse Comics. (Second printing: March 27, 2002)
- Whedon, Joss (w), Moline, Karl (p), Owens, Andy (i), Stewart, Dave and Madsen, Michelle (col), Madsen, Michelle (let), Allie, Scott (ed). "Chapter Seven: The Gateway" Fray, no. 7 (April 23, 2003). Dark Horse Comics.
- Whedon, Joss (w), Moline, Karl (p), Owens, Andy (i), Stewart, Dave and Madsen, Michelle (col), Madsen, Michelle (let), Allie, Scott (ed). "Chapter Eight: All Hell" Fray, no. 8 (August 6, 2003). Dark Horse Comics.

=== Collected editions ===
- Fray: Future Slayer (softcover trade paperback collecting the miniseries, ISBN 1-56971-751-6, published November 26, 2003)
- Fray: Future Slayer (hardcover edition of the above trade paperback, ISBN 1-56971-992-6, published November 26, 2003)
- Fray (British reprint of the softcover collection, ISBN 1-84023-448-2, published December 19, 2003)

== See also ==
- Buffyverse Slayer Mythology
- Tales of the Slayers – Fray makes an appearance in "Tales"
- Time of Your Life
