= No Future for You =

- Cover of Buffy the Vampire Slayer Season Eight: No Future for You trade paperback collected edition Art by Jo Chen
- Publisher: Dark Horse Comics
- Publication date: September – December 2007
- Genre: Action/adventure, horror; Based on Buffy the Vampire Slayer; Vampire
- Title(s): Buffy the Vampire Slayer Season Eight #6-9
- Main character(s): Faith Lehane; Rupert Giles

Creative team
- Writer: Brian K. Vaughan
- Penciller: Georges Jeanty
- Inker: Andy Owens
- Colorist: Dave Stewart

With respect to the Buffy the Vampire Slayer franchise
- The material covered in this article is a continuity issue in the canon of Buffy the Vampire Slayer.

"No Future for You" is the second story arc of the Buffy the Vampire Slayer Season Eight series of comic books, based upon the television series of the same name, and is written by Brian K. Vaughan. The story arc would be reprinted in trade paperback under the publication of Dark Horse Comics on June 4, 2008.

== Plot ==
=== Part I (Issue #6) ===
Faith sits atop the Art Deco Hope Memorial Bridge in Cleveland, smoking. After somewhat cynically reminiscing that her mother used to read Oh, The Places You'll Go! to her as a child, she receives a telephone call from Robin Wood. Wood and his "squad" are taking care of a vampire nest, but he tells Faith that one of the vampires they staked used to be a single mother and asks Faith to go check on the children. Faith arrives at the dead woman's house and finds six children, all vampires. After quickly dusting them, she heads back to her apartment.

She finds Rupert Giles waiting for her and drinking tea. Giles needs Faith for a dangerous mission with high stakes. If she succeeds, he will give her a passport to anywhere, with a new name and an early retirement. Faith agrees, and finds out Giles wants her to kill a rogue Slayer for whom there is no hope of rehabilitation. Giles trains a reluctant Faith to pass as an English aristocrat, so that she can crash Lady Genevieve's 19th birthday party and assassinate her.

In Scotland, Buffy and Xander are training. After Buffy questions him, Xander states that he needs to train so he can be Renee's sparring partner. After Buffy makes fun of his love interest, she stares blankly at the symbol of twilight from the first arc. Buffy confides that she has a recurring nightmare in which a monster says, "The Queen is dead. Long live the Queen" and then devours her.

Now in England, Faith dresses for the party while Giles gives her a last-minute quiz in etiquette. Faith appears at the top of the stairs in an elegant gown, ready to leave for the party, and asks Giles if things are all right, to which Giles responds that things are "five by five."

=== Part II (Issue #7) ===
Faith has a flashback of her battle with Buffy ("Graduation Day"). In the present, Faith has arrived at Genevieve's party, with a knife concealed in her hair. She hears Giles through an earbud, but throws it away, saying, "I've got enough voices in my head already." When Faith is inside, she pulls the knife from her hair, ready to attack Genevieve. Faith wonders why she is so nervous about this, when she has killed people before. Meanwhile, Genevieve's steward, Roden, watches over the party, and speaks to some of his flying gargoyles, telling them to be wary of the fourth person in Genevieve's receiving line: Faith.

In Scotland, Dawn and Willow have a conversation, and it turns around to the subject of Kenny, with whom everyone thinks Dawn had sex. Despite Willow's attempts to cheer up Dawn, she cries a little and is about to open up to Willow, when Renee brings the message that Buffy needs Willow's advice on computer security.

Later, Faith is outside Genevieve's house, smoking a cigarette and seems to be experiencing trepidations about her assignment. However Faith is determined to go back in and kill Genevieve once she has finished smoking. Genevieve startles Faith, who introduces herself as Hope Lyonne, daughter of the Viscount Avalon. As they chat about life and family, Faith slowly draws out the knife from her hair. Suddenly, Faith is lifted off her feet by Roden's flying gargoyles. She climbs onto one and sends it crashing to the ground. After disposing of the other, she faints.

In Genevieve's room, she and Roden argue whether or not to kill the unconscious Faith. Genevieve doesn't want to and thinks Faith would be a great asset as a partner. Faith wakes up and talks to Genevieve. When Genevieve mentions that she wants to overtake the queen, Faith asks if Genevieve is going to kill the current queen of Britain. Genevieve opens her closet, which is filled with pictures of Buffy, the symbol of Twilight marked on one of them, and says, "No, Hope. Not Elizabeth."

=== Part III (Issue #8) ===
After discovering Genevieve is planning to kill Buffy, Faith jumps to the conclusion that Giles sent her to save Buffy from Genevieve. Nevertheless, she continues her assignment, and convinces Genevieve that she has sided with her. They immediately start bonding, even taking a bath together.

Outside the Savidge Manor, Giles along with a freelancer is trying to break into the manor to rescue Faith. The freelancer suggests that Faith has gone "native", and she's not working for Giles anymore.

In Scotland, Buffy and Willow are fixing up some of the force fields around the arena and discussing how they should respond to the danger posed by the army. Genevieve and Roden teleport Buffy to their stately home. Buffy and Genevieve fight, while Faith watches from a balcony. While the rogue Slayer proves to be an accomplished fighter, she is defeated by the more experienced Buffy. As Buffy is about to deliver the killing blow, and Roden prepares to attack Buffy with magic, Faith leaps into the fight. Buffy accuses her of switching sides again, despite Faith's attempts to convince her otherwise. Buffy attacks Faith, and during the ensuing battle, Faith almost drowns Buffy in a swimming pool, but comes to her senses in time. At that moment, Willow teleports Buffy back to Scotland, leaving Faith alone and shaken. While Buffy orders Willow to contact Giles immediately, back at the Savidge residence, Faith sits crestfallen as Genevieve approaches and prepares to swing an axe at her head, realizing that her friend has betrayed her...

=== Part IV (Issue #9) ===
A flashback to a scene in Buffy the Vampire Slayer's third season, between the Mayor and Faith, shows how Faith currently views the Mayor. She knows he was wrong and evil, yet how she can't help but feel loved when she thinks of him. Once the flashback ends, Genevieve and Faith start to fight. Faith tries to make Genevieve understand that Roden is wrong and is steering her in the wrong direction, but Genevieve refuses to listen.

Outside Savidge Manor, Giles and the freelancer are still trying to break in to the grounds. Giles talks to Willow and Buffy. Willow adds her magic to his task; Buffy conveys she is angry with him for recent incidents.

Back in the greenhouse, Faith and Genevieve are still fighting. Faith mortally wounds her opponent in self-defense and begs Roden to heal her. He tries to recruit her instead, an offer she turns down. Roden attacks, only to be slain by Giles.

The following morning, Faith and Giles discuss the situation and agree to be 'social workers' for rogue Slayers, especially considering Buffy is mad at both of them.

Somewhere on top of a plateau a woman named Lieutenant Molter talks to a floating figure called Twilight. He states Roden and Gigi's deaths were part of a plan and Buffy will die soon enough.

== Production ==
Joss Whedon and Brian K. Vaughan collaborated in breaking down the story, before Vaughan penned the four-part story individually. Vaughan had previously pitched the broad strokes of the story at a dinner with Whedon, Tim Minear and Drew Goddard as a direct-to-DVD Faith movie. There were some presumptions that Vaughan would have difficulty writing the characters' dialogue, given that he wasn't a member of the TV series' writing staff. Despite so, Vaughan proved otherwise. Whedon himself was compelled to tell Vaughan what great lines he had written to Faith specifically. His writing, like the series', featured numerous pop-culture references. The title itself refers to a verse from the song "God Save the Queen" by the Sex Pistols. Other rock song lyrics are mentioned by characters as well: Faith tells Giles she's "the go-to girl for dirty deeds done dirt cheap," whereas Roden paraphrases Pink Floyd's song "Another Brick in the Wall" with the phrase "as a wise man once said, you can't have any pudding if you don't eat your meat." Giles, sporting a jumper with a Yellow Submarine design, refers to "the great bearded wizard of Northampton": a nod to legendary comic book writer and magician Alan Moore. Buffy refers to Lady Genevieve and her accomplices as Faith's 'droogs', a Nadsat term used in Anthony Burgess' A Clockwork Orange to define friend or associate. Finally, whilst training, Xander makes reference to Snake Plissken, the eye-patch wearing anti-hero of Escape from New York, as well as Captain Ron, another eyepatch-wearing character played by Kurt Russell.

Georges Jeanty returned since penciling the first four issues. He too included pop-culture references in the artwork, such as Giles' jumper. He humorously penciled the Tenth Doctor and Rose Tyler from British science fiction television series Doctor Who. Jeanty also references to past Buffy episodes, such as Xander's Sunnydale High School's swim team T-shirt; Xander had previously joined the swim team to investigate the deaths of some of its members in season two. In a flashback sequence in "No Future for You, Part II", Jeanty replicated the scene from "Graduation Day". He detailed the panels to the televised episode with such detail including Buffy and Faith's blocking.

== Canonical issues ==
This series has been described as canon by both Whedon and various commentators. As the creator of Buffy, Joss Whedon's association with Buffyverse story is often linked to how canonical the various stories are. Since this story is part of the larger canonical Season Eight plotted by Whedon, it is considered to continue from the official continuity established by Buffy and Angel.

Season Eight contradicts and supersedes information given in the paperback novels set after Season Seven, such as Queen of the Slayers and Dark Congress, which are described by their writer Christopher Golden as being set in an unofficial "parallel" continuity.

== Timeline ==
- Intended to be set at least a year and a half after BtVS's seventh season. The precise timing of this arc is currently uncertain.

Preceded by "The Chain"	Buffy the Vampire Slayer Season Eight storylines 2007	Succeeded by "Anywhere But Here"
