= Karl Moline =

American cartoonist (1973–2024)

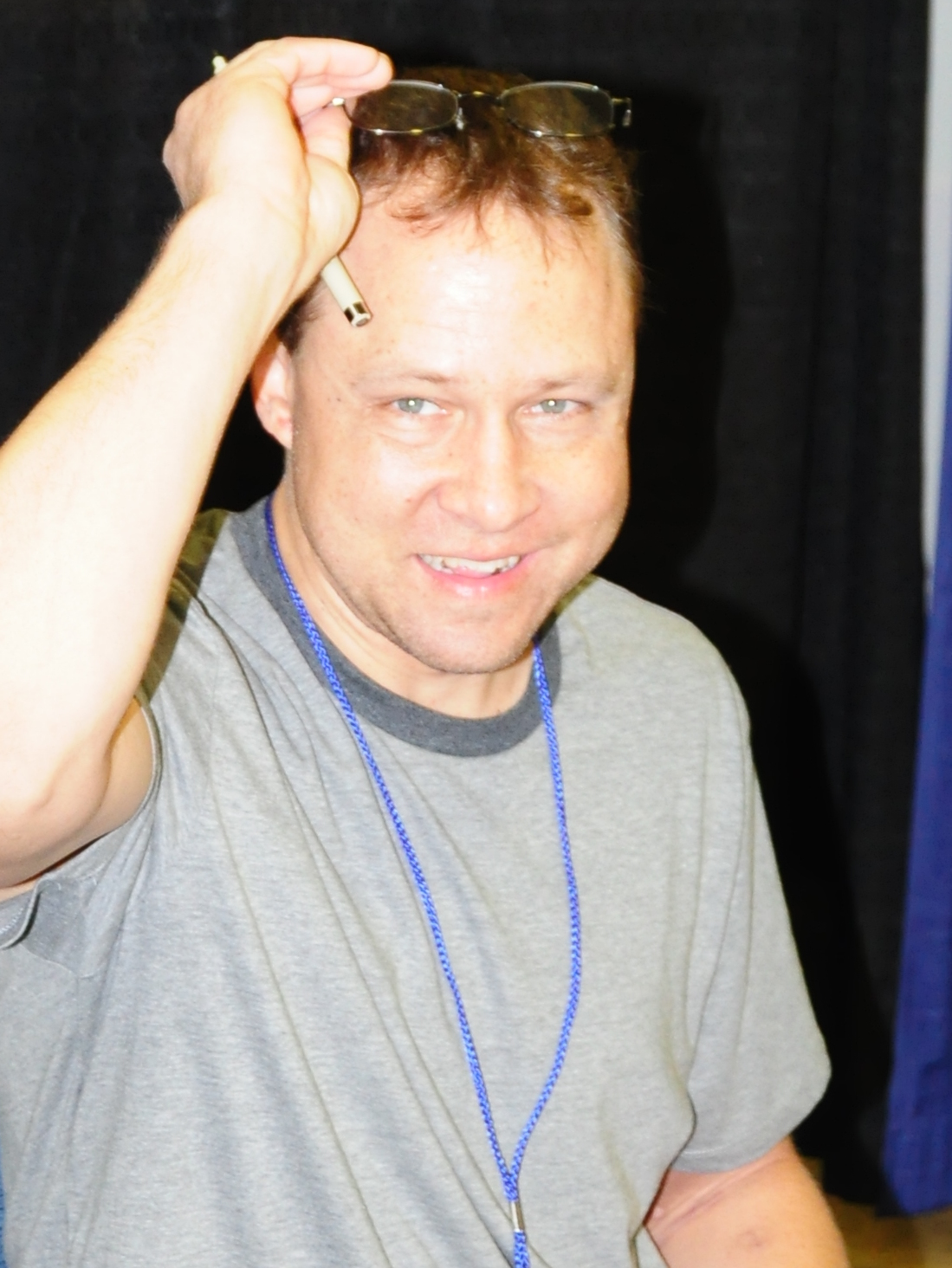
- Moline in 2012
- Born: June 26, 1973 Reston, Virginia, U.S.
- Died: September 11, 2024 (aged 51) Clearwater, Florida, U.S.
- Areas: Writer, Artist
- Notable works: Fray

Karl Michael Moline (June 26, 1973 – September 11, 2024) was an American comic book artist who was the co-creator of Fray (along with Joss Whedon). He provided the artwork for Fray, as well as the associated Fray-centric story in Tales of the Slayers.

== Early life ==
Moline graduated from Maryland Institute College of Art. He started penciling in 1995.

== Career ==
In 2001, he signed an exclusive contract with CrossGen where he penciled the horror book Route 666.

Following CrossGen's closure, he returned to mainstream comics providing pencils on a 2004 run of Marvel's Rogue and partnering with writer C. B. Cebulski on Marvel's limited series The Loners. In 2008 he returned to Dark Horse and Buffy to pencil the Fray storyline in Buffy the Vampire Slayer Season Eight #16-19 "Time of Your Life".

== Illness and death ==
Having received a kidney and pancreas transplant in 2015, Moline had health issues since 2019.

Moline lived near Tampa, Florida. He died on September 11, 2024, at age 51.

== Bibliography ==
- CrossGen
  - Scion #22 (2002)
  - Route 666 #1-4, 6–9, 11–14, 16–17, 19-22 (2002-2004)
- Dark Horse Comics
  - Dark Horse Presents Vol. 1 #157 (2000)
  - Fray #1-8 (2001-2003)
  - Tales of the Slayers Original Graphic Novel (2002)
  - Buffy the Vampire Slayer Season Eight #16-19 (2008)
  - B.P.R.D. War of Frogs #3 (2009)
  - Buffy the Vampire Slayer: Willow Oneshot (2009)
  - Buffy the Vampire Slayer: Riley Oneshot (2010)
  - B.P.R.D. The Dead Remembers #1-3 (2011)
  - Buffy the Vampire Slayer Season Nine #5, 14–15, 20 (2012-2013)
  - Dark Horse Presents Vol. 2 #25-27 (2013)
  - Buffy the Vampire Slayer Season Ten #6 (2014)
- DC Comics
  - R.E.B.E.L.S. Annual #1 (2009)
  - Supergirl #34 (2014)
  - Convergence: Superboy #1-2 (2015)
- Harris Publications
  - Vampirella Strikes #3 (1995)
- Marvel Comics
  - 2099: World of Tomorrow #3-4 (1996)
  - Daredevil 2099 Oneshot (2004)
  - Rogue Vol. 3 #7-8, 10, 12 (2005)
  - Spider-Man Unlimited #7 (2005)
  - The Loners #1-5 (2007-2008)
  - X-Men Origins: Emma Frost (2010)
  - Nation X #3 (2010)
  - Avengers Academy #27-28 (2012)
  - Hulk Smash Avengers #3 (2012)
  - Avengers Arena #13-14, 16 (2013)
  - Disney Kingdoms: Seekers of the Weird #1-2, 4-5 (2014)
- Mike Wolfer Entertainment
  - Widow: Progeny #1 (1997)
- Valiant Comics
  - Unity #24-25 (2015)

== See also ==
- Fray
- Buffy the Vampire Slayer Season Eight
