= Harap Alb =

Romanian fairy tale

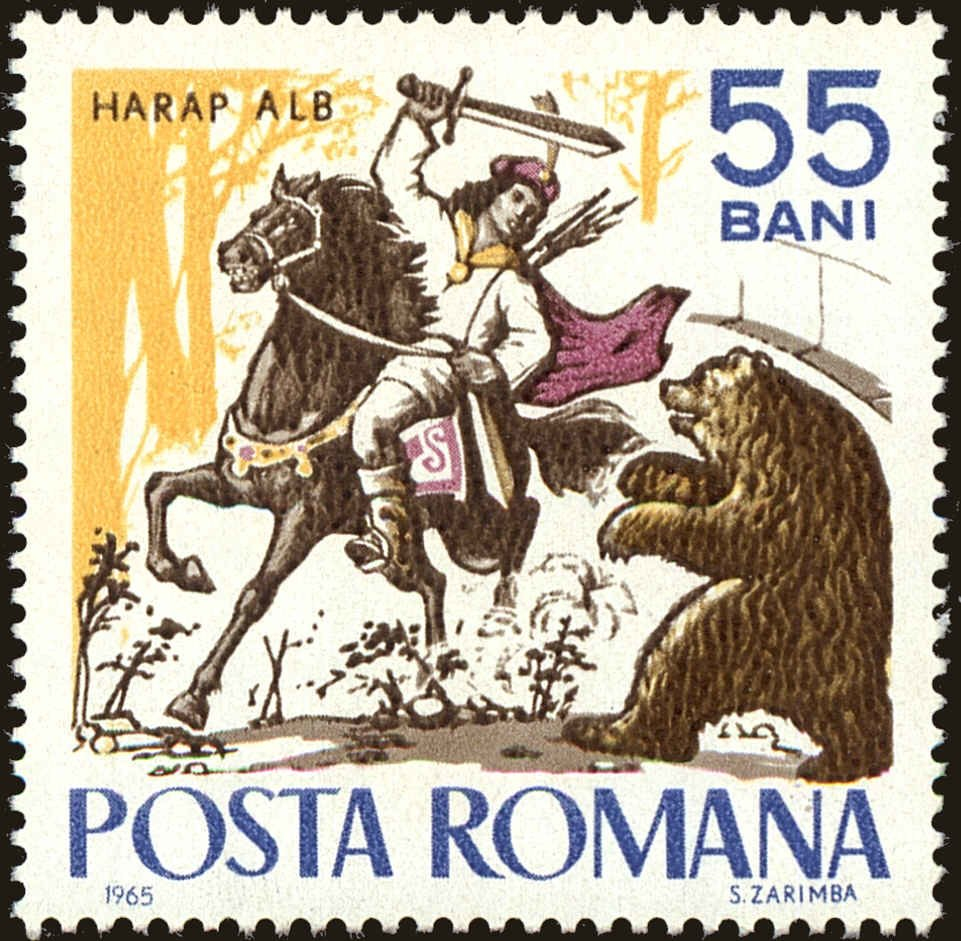
Harap Alb on a Romanian stamp

"Harap Alb" or "Harap-Alb" (Romanian pronunciation: [haˈrap ˈalb]) is the protagonist as well as the title of a Romanian-language fairy tale by Ion Creangă, known in full as Povestea lui Harap Alb ("The Story of Harap Alb"). He is the youngest of three princes.

"Harap Alb" received much posthumous attention from literary critics, and inspired works in other genres. These include Ion Popescu-Gopo's film De-aș fi Harap Alb, a Postmodernist novel by Stelian Țurlea and a comic book by Sandu Florea, alongside one of Gabriel Liiceanu's theses in the field of political philosophy.

== Name ==
Harap Alb in Romanian signifies "White African" or "White Arab". The word harap is an antiquated form of arap derived from "Arab" means "black person" or a "Moor". It may also refer to a handsome man, usually with dark features.

The arap or harap are a stereotypical race in the folklore of the Balkans, from Turkey in the south to modern Romania in the north, often, but not always, portrayed in a negative light. Cognate terms exist in Albanian (arap in the Tosk, harap in Gheg) and Bulgarian-language (арап, arap or арапин, arapin).

The name may also be an allusion to the protagonist's slave-like condition of "degradation and submission", as alp may be readily associated with the African slave trade or the enslavement of minorities in the Slavery in Romania. The tale thus becomes the hero's quest for the recovery of "human status". The name which means "White Black" has also been regarded as an oxymoronic example of absurdist tradition in the local folklore by comparatist Vasile Măruţă.

== Plot summary ==
=== Beginning ===
The narrative begins with a stock formula: a king's three sons are sent on a quest, and the hero, the youngest son, is set to succeed.

An unnamed king has a brother, the Green Emperor (Împăratul Verde) who is nearing death, and as he has no male heirs, he has written to the king to send any of his three princes, and whichever one completes the journey shall inherit the whole empire. The kingdom and the Empire are on the "margins" of the earth, separated by desolate lands.

The eldest son agrees to take up his uncle's challenge, and the king decides to test his courage by dressing up in a bearskin and blocking the bridge along the way. The eldest prince makes a terrified return home. The monarch plays the same trick on his second son, with the same result. Without revealing his ruse, the king expresses his disappointment, which prompts the youngest to burst into tears and run out to the palace garden. There, an old woman beggar tells his fortune: the youngest prince shall become a glorious emperor. She urges him to attempt his uncle's quest, but warns that he should use only the items his father had when he was a bridegroom: ragged clothes, rusty weapons and an old stallion. She then vanishes into the skies.

The youngest prince suffers his father's ridicule, but eventually obtains permission to go, and the king's old items. The horse can be identified by the piece of wisdom given him by the old woman: the right horse will be the only one in the stable which will approach a tray full of embers at feeding. The horse gives three shakes and transforms into a beautiful steed. The horse can talk with his new master, and carry him leaping to the clouds and the Moon. The prince goes to the bridge and endures the bear ruse, and the king gives him the bearskin as trophy. As parting words, he tells the youngest prince to beware "of the Red Man, and especially of the Bald one".

=== The Bald Man ===
The next leg of the journey takes the prince into a deep forest inhabited by the evil Bald Man (Spânul), who will enslave him by trickery. The prince twice rebuffs the Bald Man's offer of services, (Note: Remembering his father's warning.) but the third time, after losing his way, decides to accept. By deception, the creature tricks the prince into the bottom of a well, and would only let him out by submitting to his condition (Note: Which had to be sworn by the edge of his broadsword (paloș).) that the two must now exchange roles. So at the palace, the Bald Man is introduced as the king's son, while the young prince follows as his servant named "Harap Alb". The Green Emperor welcomes them unsuspectingly, but the Emperor's daughter catches the master striking his servant and reproaches him; she begins to wonder which one out of the two is truly noble and which one is base.

Bear and stag quests

Harap-Alb is soon sent on his first dangerous quest. He is ordered by the Bald Man to retrieve the "salad from the Bear's Garden", which the Green Emperor was fond of. His talking horse reassures him and flying up into the air, carries him to an island, where he is reunited with the fortunetelling beggar, who now identifies herself as "Saint Sunday" (Sfânta Duminică). She dopes the bear's watering fountain with a sleep-inducing infusion of herbs, honey, and milk, and Harap Alb wrapped in bearskin gathers the salad before the beast awakes.

Harap-Alb's second dangerous assignment is to hunt the enchanted deer whose skin is studded with precious stones, and to bring back its skull and hide. The deer's stare strikes one dead and no one has ever survived. Saint Sunday provides him with the visor and sword of Statu-Palmă-Barbă-Cot (Note: Given as is in Sturdza's translation. German: Spannhoch-Ellenbart.) (a dwarfish character). Following her directions, Harap Alb hides in a deep pit and ambushes the stag, cutting of its head in one stroke, then returns to the hole waiting until the head to completely die. During his wait, the severed stag's head calls out with a human voice asking to see him, and had he complied, the stag's "poisoned eye", would have killed him.

Red Emperor's daughter

The triumphant return with the gems greatly enhances Harap Alb's prestige, as well as Green Emperor's esteem of him. The Bald Man jealously tries to credit the feats to himself for training his servant with his stern ways. While the monarch is credulous, his daughter and her sisters grow even more skeptical, and decide to investigate further. They ask Harap Alb to set the table for the banquet, but the Bald Man makes the servant swear not to engage in conversation with the ladies. At the festivities, an enchanted bird-like creature, Pasărea măiastră makes a surprise visit and announces: "You are eating, drinking and enjoying yourselves, but you fail to think about the Red Emperor's daughter!" There follows a lively debate concerning the tyrannical Red Emperor (Împăratul Roșu) and his daughter. Some guests claim that the latter is a malevolent witch, and some still that she is the bird itself, on a mission to propagate fear. The Bald Man subsequently volunteers Harap Alb to investigate the mystery, and sends him on a quest to capture the Red Emperor's daughter.

=== Journey to Red Emperor ===
Helper animals

The prince's journey begins with an act of pity. He happens upon a wedding procession of ants on the bridge, and rather than to trample on them, decides to ford the deep-watered river. A grateful winged ant gives him its wings, telling him to burn these in his need, and the entire colony will come to his aid. The prince has a similar encounter, this time with swarming bees. He deposits his hat for the swarm to rest, then later carries them to a new hive he made by hollowing out a log. In gratitude the queen bee presents him with a wing with which to summon her in his moment of seeking help.

Companions

Harap Alb continues the journey, and gains five companions. The first is Gerilă (from ger, "frost", and the diminutive suffix -ilă), a man who shivers even in summer, whose cold breath turns into a gale that freezes everything to ice. After being bantered, Gerilă replies "Laugh if you will, Harap Alb, but you'll not be able to accomplish anything without me where you're going", and the prince changes his mind, agreeing to let the man accompany him. They are joined by Flămânzilă (from flămând, "hungry"; translated as "Eat-All"), who can consume huge amounts without satisfying his appetite and Setilă (from sete, "thirst"; also "Drink-All") with the bottomless drinking ability, Ochilă (from ochi, "eye"), a sharp-eyed man whose sight reaches far distances, and Păsări-Lăți-Lungilă (from pasăre, "bird", a se lăți, "to widen oneself" and a se lungi, "to lengthen oneself"), who can grow in any direction at will, and reach heights only accessible to birds. Initially the gathering produces one disaster after another: burned down forests, depleted soil, drainage of water, exposure of secrets, and bird-killing. Harap Alb alone "did not cause any disruption".

Red Emperor's castle

The group eventually reaches the Red Emperor's court, where Harap Alb announces his intention to leave with the girl. The Red Emperor tries to eliminate them by lodging them in acopper house, and ordering it heate to an oven-like temperature. Gerilă with his cold breath cooled it down. As a dilatory tactic, the Red Emperor invites the group to a feast, only to witness with alarm how rapidly his food and drink are consumed by Flămânzilă and Setilă. The emperor then demands a test: they must sort a mierță (some 200 liters) of poppy seed from an equivalent quantity of fine sand in the space of one night, but this is accomplished with assistance from the ants. The monarch then tells the heroes that, if they want his daughter, they are to guard and follow for another night, letting them know that he does not know her ways. At midnight, the princess turns into a bird and escapes the palace, but, even though she takes refuge in the most inaccessible places, from "the shadow of the rabbit" to the far side of the Moon, she is tracked down by Ochilă and eventually grabbed by Păsări-Lăţi-Lungilă.

The Red Emperor gives his final test: Harap Alb must distinguish the real daughter from his adoptive daughter, who is her exact double. This the protagonist accomplishes with assistance from the queen bee which identifies the real princess and alights on her cheek. A final challenge is presented by the girl herself, as a race between her turtle dove and his horse, to go to the place "from where the mountains bump head to head into each other", and obtain three twigs of its apple tree, three measures of the water of life and three measures of the dead water. Although slower, the horse forces the returning bird to hand him the items, and is first to return. The princess accepts the result as her destiny, and now willingly accompanies Harap Alb.

=== Triumph ===
Harap's companions disperse and go back to their original spots where they joined the group. Harap Alb falls in love with his hostage, and is downcast at the prospect of having to surrender her to the Bald Man.

At the Green Emperor's court, the captivated Bald Man tries to take the Red Emperor's daughter by his arms, but she rebuffs him completely, exposing the Bald Man for assuming a false identity, and declaring that her intended (i.e. husband-to-be) was the real emperor's nephew, Harap Alb. The enraged Bald Man severs the hero's head with the broadsword the prince swore his oath on. The stallion snatches the Bald Man with its teeth, flies high up into the skies, and drops him to the ground. The princess mends back the prince's head and body, twirls the apple branch thrice over his head, repairing the wounds with the dead water, and reviving him with the water of life. The story ends with a magnificent wedding between Harap Alb, recognized as successor to the Green Emperor, and the Red Emperor's daughter—a feast which, according to the narrator's account, lasts "to this day".

== Style and symbolism ==
=== Generic traits ===
Owing to its sampling of intricate narrative traditions and its use of symbols, "Harap Alb" has been a traditional target of critical interest, and has produced various interpretations. George Bădărău, who calls the story in its recorded form a "cultured fairy tale", discusses it as a "concise adventure novel [...] which has an accentuated ethical, didactic character". Bădărău, who discusses the work's "great thematic complexity", also argues: "in general lines, Creangă's fairy tale follows the archetypal pattern of the popular fantasy tale". Similarly, researcher Mircea Braga notes that the text is one of many by Creangă where a traditional pattern of folkloric inspiration is closely followed. This, he believes, is structured around three narrative solutions, the first of which is a "perturbing situation"—here, the "extremely difficult journey" undertaken by the boy prince. The initial event is closely followed by a set of challenges invoking the action of forces larger than human life, "a whirlpool of events whose onset [the hero] cannot control, but which he dominates with support from supernatural beings and magical objects". A third element, the happy ending, consecrates the victory of good over evil, and often distributes justice in an uncompromising and violent form. Braga also sees "Harap Alb" as a peak among its author's literary contributions, ranking it above writings with similar pretexts such as The Story of the Pig. According to literary historian George Călinescu, the work also serves to illustrate Ion Creangă's interest in structuring each of his narratives around a distinctive moral, in this case: "that the gifted man will earn a reputation under any guise".

The tale's narrative setting has itself been subject to critical scrutiny. According to literary historian and critic Garabet Ibrăileanu, it is "a projection into the fabulous of the peasant world, captured in its archaic stage, organized in Homeric fashion". The definitive version, which localizes dialectical patterns and bases the interactions between characters on the hierarchies of a village, allows critics to identify the setting as being the writer's native region of Moldavia, and probably even the rural area around Târgu Neamț. The effect is underlined by Ion Creangă's recourse to orality and its samples of Romanian humor: the narrative technique is enriched by descriptions, dialogue, the narrator's self-interrogation, interjections, jokes, fragments of folk poetry and various other picturesque elements. George Călinescu makes special note of the manner in which Creangă's narrative relies on peasant speech, and how its nuances serve to distinguish individual characters, all of which, he believes, exists within the framework of "playful realism". George Bădărău sees the writer's "pleasure of recounting [Bădărău's italics], verve and optimism" as instrumental contributions, likening Creangă's style to that of his predecessors François Rabelais and Anton Pann. Among the generic stylistic traits identified by Bădărău is the story's repeated and diverse use of "Homeric" hyperbole, from the presence of supernatural beings to the happy ending's transformation into an eternal feast. Another defining element of the account is the pause for effect, visually marked by the ellipsis and possibly originating from oral tradition, where it may also have allowed narrators to rest their voices. According to French academic Michel Moner, "Harap Alb" is one of the tales illustrating such techniques "to perfection".

Among the elements which localize the narrative landscape, the collection of objects handled by the destitute prince throughout his quest is seen by Bădărău as an essence of "archaic civilization" and "forgotten tradition", culminating in the grant of a backsword, the "symbol of knightly valor". In Mircea Braga's view, many of them are means to a goal, which "can be 'lost' without consequence for the later development of the narrative, as happens, for instance, with the helmet and sword of Statu-Palmă-Barbă-Cot". The animals themselves behave mostly as they are supposed to, occasionally changing their behavior for the benefit of the plot: "the extraordinary horse will not be able to prevent getting lost in the forest" and "is not able to prevent the Bald Man's ruse", but "he will lead [the prince], without straying, to Holy Sunday's house" and "shall become the one to kill [the Bald Man]". Basing himself on previous studies, Braga also concludes that the bearing of hunting-related symbolism on both the quests and the objects serving to overcome them is a clue to the ancient origin of the tale. In the view of comparatist Liliana Vernică, these items represent several aspects of the universe. Thus, the objects inherited from the king are supposed to symbolize "nature" and "the father's virtues: intelligence (the horse), beauty (the clothes), virility (the weapons) and self-restraint (the bridle)".

=== The protagonist and his aides ===
The prince figure around whom the plot revolves has been defined by various researchers as a variant of the Romanian Prince Charming, or Făt-Frumos, and through him of various other heroic figures in European folklore. Citing the earlier assessment of researcher Emil Bucuța, literary historian Virgiliu Ene spoke of similarities between Harap Alb, Făt-Frumos and Sigurd of the Nibelungenlied (who, Bucuța and Ene note, also hides in a pit while waiting to kill the monster Fafnir).

The eponymous hero's quest is seen by critics as equivalent to a rite of passage, or more specifically to a coming of age quest. The finality of this process, Bădărău notes, is Harap Alb's "social, ethical and erotic" fulfillment. According to Liliana Vernică, the process of reaching "spiritual maturity" is a complex one, involving three stages and, respectively, three narrative levels: the "suffering" Harap Alb evidences after being shamed by his brothers, the symbolic "death" which comes with giving in to the Bald Man's ruse, and the "rebirth" illustrated by his exploits. According to Bădărău, Harap Alb portrays the Romanians' "national moral code", being characterized by "natural behavior" as opposed to "supernatural properties", evidencing "kindness, intelligence, sensibility, industriousness, patience, discretion" and "a moral sense, wittiness, joviality". Creangă's aim of rendering the prince as a familiar and sympathetic figure, the critic notes, is outlined by several elements in the story: "The protagonist sobs when he is scolded by his father, covers his mouth [in disbelief], falls victim all too easily to the Bald Man". Similarly, George Călinescu referred to the three princes' journeys as closely as equivalent to "a peasant from the Bistrița leaving on a logging trip". Vernică, who notes that the king disguised as a bear guards "the threshold between the familial and social spaces", also observed that the prince's acceptance of his original quest, as depicted by Creangă's narrative, "is not out of his own will [...], but more so in order to alleviate his father's grief".

In Bădărău's view, the main characteristics setting Ion Creangă's account apart from its sources of inspiration is its treatment of the other characters: "With Creangă, the characters are no longer symbolic, abstract (as they are in popular fairy tales), but display a psychological, peasant-like [...] individuality, within a framework that blends the supernatural and the real". He sees this as being especially true for the prince's "five fabulous friends" (Ochilă, Setilă, Gerilă, Flămânzilă, Păsări-Lăți-Lungilă), whose choice of names, "defining the character trait which individualizes them", is "a particularity of Creangă's fairy tale [Bădărău's italics]". Braga underlines the serendipitous nature of these characters' presence within the story, which he also believes is relevant for Holy Sunday and Harap Alb's horse: "[they all] are nothing but 'helpers', with more or less unnatural powers, they appear to us as forces whose exercise is invoked by the very development of the 'ordeal'". In Vernică's interpretation, they may also represent anthropomorphized manifestations of the hero's own "energies", which he is supposed to be putting to use. Critic Simona Brânzaru places the representations of Flămânzilă and Setilă, both of whom "seem somewhat content to have gotten their friend out of trouble", in connection with the ideas of Russian philosopher Mikhail Bakhtin on the "philosophy of the Gaster" (that is, belly), while noting: "As in any fairy-tale, be it in its cultivated variant, nothing is accidental".

=== The enemies ===
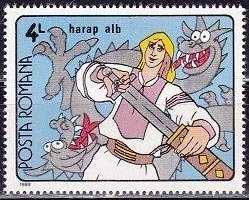
Harap-Alb

The Bald Man, despite his rustic "peasant speech", (Spânul) is depicted as an evil and despotic antithesis to Harap Alb. Liliana Vernică also sees in the villain a "double" of the protagonist, one who takes complete control of his victim's mind through persuasion. Historian Adrian Majuru however provides an ethnographic theory regarding the figure, placing it in relation to Romanian history. He thus compares the Bald Man and other hairless antagonists in Romanian folklore with negative images of the raiding Tatars, who, in contrast to their Romanian adversaries, customarily shaved their skulls.

According to ethnologist Pavel Ruxăndoiu, the characteristic baldness also has the attribute of an omen, corresponding to a traditional view that God marks dangerous men. He draws a similar conclusion in respect to the fragment in which the Bald Man doubles as the "red man" (omul roșu), noting that it could be read as a proverb (in a line with various attested Romanian sayings, which caution against keeping company with "wild" or "insane" people).

Described by researcher of children's literature Muguraş Constantinescu as "evil and cunning", the Red Emperor is the story's secondary antagonist. The adjective designating him evidences a folkloric tradition which associates a range of negative or malignant features with the color red. In this context, several other local fairy tales refer to a perpetual conflict between a Red Emperor on one side, and a Green or White one on the other. According to linguist Lazăr Şăineanu, the monarch designated as "red" is portrayed by such accounts as "the cruelest tyrant of his time", and a common theme involves him forcing the hero to solve "enigmas" on the pain of death. In Creangă's version, George Călinescu notes, such attributes are accompanied by the character's manner of expressing himself with "crass vulgarity" (the critic cites him invoking the devil and commenting on his daughter's sexual availability in dialogues with the prince).

Majuru, building on observations initially made by Șăineanu, notes that the Red Emperor, as well as the cryptic "red man" omen, allude to another aspect of ethnic strife: a possible early medieval conflict between locals and the intruding Khazars, or "Red Jews". The emperor's daughter is believed by Vernică to be standing for the prince's achievement of his ultimate goal, that of controlling his own life, with their marriage being a "hierogamy between the Virgin-Mother-Earth and the Aquarius-Father-Sky".

=== Other characters ===
The Green Emperor's characteristics heavily contrast with those of his evil counterpart. He is, according to Constantinescu, "good, charitable, welcoming", "a perfect host" and "a sage who, with responsibility and serenity, foresees the proper order of things". Building on an earlier comment by George Călinescu, Constantinescu sees the monarch figure, his association with the color green and his appreciation of lettuce, as epitomizing a healthy lifestyle and the preservation of vitality in old age. In his implicit agreement to have the prince act as a suitor for the Red Emperor's daughter Vernică sees proof that the "wise old man" plays a role in Harap Alb's sexual awakening, and in "stripping away [the prince's] ego".

Resembling the Green Emperor to a certain degree, Holy Sunday also illustrates a positive vision of old age. The character makes an appearance in another two of Creangă's tales ("The Story of the Pig" and "The Old Man's Daughter and the Old Woman's Daughter"), but, according to Muguraş Constantinescu, her depiction in "Harap Alb" is "the most complex". The researcher discusses the intricate religious representations of Holy Sunday, as evidenced by "Harap Alb" and the other texts: the narratives alternate between the themes Christian mythology (the sacred position of Sundays in the liturgical calendar) and paganism (the queen of fairy creatures, or zâne). In Constantinescu's assessment, Holy Sunday is "an earthly being, attached to the plants and flowers", whose abode on the island is "a symbol of isolation and happy solitude", but also an "aerial being" displaying "the lightness of clouds". According to Vernică, she and Harap Alb's stallion are both key figures on the first narrative level, and who "emerge from the realm of the real as manifestations of energies". Her first appearance in the story, the researcher proposes, borrows from the imagery from angels, and stands for "an enlightenment of the mind by God". George Bădărău sees in Holy Sunday as "a gifted woman" who plays an essential part in the coming of age rituals of traditional rural society, but also as a holy woman "under the guise of a peasant".

In addition, Constantinescu places stress on the alternation of youthful and old age attributes: "Despite her multicentennial age, she manifests rather astonishing liveliness and physical agility". According to the same commentator, the saint's literal charm over the prince stems from her "bewitching" discourse, which is "half-humble, half-ironical" in content, as well as from her other "supernatural powers".

=== Classification ===
In the Aarne-Thompson-Uther Index, this literary tale shows plot elements from types 531, "The Clever Horse"; 513A, "How Six Made Their Way in the World"; and 554, "The Grateful Animals".

== Cultural impact and tributes ==
The Bald Man (top) and Harap Alb (bottom), as depicted by Sandu Florea

The "Harap Alb" story made a sizable impact on later Romanian literature, through its presence in critical commentary, as well as through homages in other works of fiction. It also touched other areas of local culture, beginning in the interwar period, when composer Alfred Mendelsohn turned it into a ballet. Several ideological interpretations of the narrative surfaced after World War II, in both Romania and the Soviet Moldavian SSR (a part of the Bassarabian areas, later independent as Moldova). Partly replicating official Marxist-Leninist interpretations in the latter region, literary historian Vasile Coroban described Harap Alb the character as an exponent of class struggle, seeing his victory over the Red Emperor as premonitory for "the fall of the bourgeois-landowning regime". During the final two decades of Romania's communist period, under the rule of Nicolae Ceauşescu, the recovery of nationalist discourse into national communist dogma also encouraged the birth of protochronism, a controversial current which a claimed Romanian precedence in culture. In a 1983 volume by one of its theorists, Edgar Papu, "Harap Alb" is seen having anticipated The Open Work, an influential volume by Italian semiotician Umberto Eco—a conclusion which literary historian Florin Mihăilescu later described as a sample of Papu's "exegetic obsession", lacking in both "sense of humor" and "sense of reality".

First brought to the Romanian stage in the eponymous adaptations of Ion Lucian (one of the first productions premiered by the Ion Creangă Children's Theater) and Zoe Anghel Stanca, "Harap Alb" was also the subject of a 1965 Romanian film, directed by celebrated filmmaker Ion Popescu-Gopo. Titled De-aş fi Harap Alb, it was noted for its tongue-in-cheek references to modernity (for instance, when showing Păsări-Lăţi-Lungilă using a three-stage arrow). The film starred Florin Piersic, who was on his third collaboration with Popescu-Gopo, in the title role. Later, the original story was also used by artist Sandu Florea as the basis for a comic book, earning him a Eurocon award. Igor Vieru, one of the Moldavian SSR's leading visual artists, was also noted for his illustrations to the story, which his disciples later turned into murals for Guguţă Coffee House in Chişinău. Additionally, the story influenced a song by Mircea Florian, included on the 1986 album Tainicul vîrtej.

"Harap Alb" continued to impact on political and social discourse in Romania after the 1989 Revolution toppled communism. In a 2004 essay later included in his Despre minciună ("On Lies") volume, philosopher Gabriel Liiceanu used a sequence of the story, that in which the Bald Man succeeds in convincing everyone that he is the king's son, to construct a critical metaphor of Romania's own post-communist history. Accusing the political system which had emerged in 1989 of promoting political corruption instead of reform, Liiceanu contended: "The 'Sign of the Bald Man' is the sign of incipient tyranny, originating with the cathartically interrupted act of the December Revolution and a Harap Alb who has been silenced. [...] But [...] there does come a time when corruption becomes extreme, when it becomes glaring for anyone to see, when everyone finds out that the Bald Man is the Bald Man and not Harap Alb. At that moment in time, a people should have an extraordinary chance in finding a living Harap Alb". The metaphor also drew a parallel between the fairy tale protagonist and Niccolò Machiavelli's theories about the ideal prince, both taken as symbols of men capable to act against public perception for the greater good (see Machiavellianism). Commenting on this vision, essayist and political analyst Arthur Suciu argued that the "living Harap Alb" Liiceanu was referring to may have been Traian Băsescu, elected President of Romania during the 2004 election. Another interpretation of the story in relation to 21st century realities comes from Indian scholar Jacob Srampickal. He evidences the manner in which the protagonist and his fellowship cooperate, and choosing "Harap Alb" as "one of the best metaphors" for interdisciplinarity, notes: "while each participant played his role at the right time, the awareness of the mission belonged always to the hero".

In 2004, Creangă's story was subjected to a Postmodern interpretation, with Stelian Ţurlea's novel Relatare despre Harap Alb ("A Report about Harap Alb"). The plot devices separating it from the original include locating the events in various real locations (from South America to the Arctic Ocean), hidden quotation from classical writers such as François Rabelais, William Shakespeare and Pierre Corneille, and depictions of the Bald Man as a Machiavellian character (in the negative sense) and of the Green Emperor as revered Moldavian Prince Stephen the Great. A new stage adaptation of the original tale, directed by Cornel Todea to the music of Nicu Alifantis, premiered in 2005 at Bucharest's Ion Creangă Children's Theater.
