= List of Buffy the Vampire Slayer comics =

Cover to a Dark Horse Comics Buffy comic

While many comic books based on the Buffy the Vampire Slayer television series were published while the show aired, they are not all considered canonical. Some feature characters who do not appear in the television series, such as the Tales of the Slayers and Tales of the Vampires miniseries. The first series of books were published by Dark Horse Comics between 1998 and 2004, initially in comic format and later collected into volumes of trade paperbacks. A small number of Buffy comics were not included in trade paperbacks, such as the titles Giles, Jonathan, and Reunion. Following the television series finale, Dark Horse began releasing new books titled Season Eight, Season Nine, and Season Ten, along with various spin-offs, written and/or supervised by creator Joss Whedon. These books were officially recognized as canon. In 2005, Dark Horse allowed the rights to produce comics for Buffy's companion series Angel to lapse, and they were acquired for a short period by IDW Publishing, which released the canonical series Angel: After the Fall alongside other non-canon titles. Dark Horse reacquired the rights in 2010 and subsequently released the series Angel & Faith and Angel. In 2018, Dark Horse Comics announced that, after 20 years, the license for Buffy and related material would transfer to Boom! Studios. The first issue of the reboot series was released in January 2019.

== Relation to the TV series ==
Buffy comics have a long history, with comics produced during the original run of the television series generally considered "non-canonical", with notable exceptions written by Joss Whedon. Buffy comic books published between 2007 and 2018 presented the official continuation of Buffy the Vampire Slayer, with series creator Joss Whedon serving as the primary writer and collaborating with other writers from the television series to continue the story.

=== Pre-2007 ===
Similar to other ancillary media for television series, such as novels and video games, storylines for the original Dark Horse comics published during the show's run were approved by both Fox and Joss Whedon as part of broader Buffy merchandising. Stories in the original 63 issues were released while the series was on air and were intended to take place between episodes of Buffy the Vampire Slayer, though they were often difficult to place precisely beyond the season in which they occurred. Plot elements or character details introduced in these stories were not referenced in the television series. Later storylines during this period attempted to fill narrative gaps following character departures, such as the Oz comic, or events between seasons five and six, such as The Death of Buffy, without introducing contradictions to the television canon. Buffy creator Joss Whedon distanced himself on several occasions from these ancillary works written by other authors, stating:

Canon is key, as is continuity. I believe there is a demarcation between original creation and ancillary works by different people. I support those projects, much like fan fiction, but I prefer clarity regarding what constitutes the official story, particularly when material shifts across media.

During this period, some canonical Buffy comics were also published with Whedon's involvement. These began with Fray (2001–2003), a far-future story written by Whedon that introduced elements later incorporated into the seventh season of the television series. Whedon and other writers from the show also contributed to the Tales of the Slayers and Tales of the Vampires (2002–2004) anthology series, which focused on Slayers and vampires from earlier eras.

=== 2007-present ===
In 2005, Dark Horse Comics and Joss Whedon announced a canonical continuation of the television series in the form of Buffy the Vampire Slayer Season Eight (2007–2011). This series shared plot elements with canonical Angel continuations published by IDW Comics, including Angel: After the Fall (2007–2009) and Spike (2010–2011). Season Eight was followed by Season Nine (2011–2013) and subsequent seasons, concluding with Buffy the Vampire Slayer Season Twelve in 2018. From 2019, the Buffy license transferred to BOOM! Studios, which produced a separate run of explicitly non-canon stories set in an alternative universe from 2019 to 2023.

== Dark Horse Comics (1998–2018) ==
=== Pre-Season Eight Stories ===
These stories are first published by Dark Horse comics, later most of Buffy stories are collected in Buffy comic books.

=== Buffy the Vampire Slayer (1998–2003) ===
Issue No.	Title	Writers	Artists	Release date	Reprinted in
1	"Wu-tang Fang"	Andi Watson	Penciller: Joe Bennett; Inker: Rick Ketcham; Colorist: Guy Major	September 23, 1998	Remaining Sunlight; Buffy the Vampire Slayer Omnibus Vol. 3
2	"Halloween"	Andi Watson	Penciller: Joe Bennett; Inker: Rick Ketcham; Colorist: Guy Major	October 28, 1998	Remaining Sunlight; Buffy the Vampire Slayer Omnibus Vol. 3
3	"Cold Turkey"	Andi Watson	Penciller: Joe Bennett; Inker: Rick Ketcham; Colorist: Guy Major	November 25, 1998	Remaining Sunlight; Buffy the Vampire Slayer Omnibus Vol. 3
4	"White Christmas"	Andi Watson	Penciller: Hector Gomez; Inker: Sandu Florea; Colorist: Guy Major	December 23, 1998	Uninvited Guests; Buffy the Vampire Slayer Omnibus Vol. 3
5	"Happy New Year"	Andi Watson	Penciller: Hector Gomez; Inker: Sandu Florea; Colorist: Guy Major	January 27, 1999	Uninvited Guests; Buffy the Vampire Slayer Omnibus Vol. 3
6	"New Kid on the Block"	Andi Watson & Dan Brereton	Penciller: Hector Gomez; Inker: Sandu Florea; Colorist: Guy Major	March 3, 1999	Uninvited Guests; Buffy the Vampire Slayer Omnibus Vol. 3
7	"New Kid on the Block"	Andi Watson & Dan Brereton	Penciller: Hector Gomez; Inker: Sandu Florea; Colorist: Guy Major	March 31, 1999	Uninvited Guests; Buffy the Vampire Slayer Omnibus Vol. 3
8	"The Final Cut"	Andi Watson	Pencillers: Jason Pearson & Cliff Richards; Inker: Joe Pimentel; Colorist: Guy Major	April 28, 1999	Supernatural Defense Kit; Buffy the Vampire Slayer Omnibus Vol. 3
9	"Hey, Good Looking" (Bad Blood, parts 1–2)	Andi Watson	Penciller: Joe Bennett; Inker: Rick Ketcham; Colorist: Guy Major	May 26, 1999	Bad Blood; Buffy the Vampire Slayer Omnibus Vol. 4
10	"Hey, Good Looking" (Bad Blood, parts 1–2)	Andi Watson	Penciller: Joe Bennett; Inker: Rick Ketcham; Colorist: Guy Major	June 30, 1999	Bad Blood; Buffy the Vampire Slayer Omnibus Vol. 4
11	"A Boy Named Sue" (Bad Blood, part 3)	Andi Watson	Penciller: Joe Bennett; Inker: Rick Ketcham; Colorist: Guy Major	July 28, 1999	Bad Blood; Buffy the Vampire Slayer Omnibus Vol. 4
12	"A Nice Girl Like You" (Food Chain, part 1)	Christopher Golden	Penciller: Christian Zanier; Inker: Andy Owens; Colorist: Guy Major	August 18, 1999	Food Chain; Buffy the Vampire Slayer Omnibus Vol. 3
13	"Love Sick Blues"	Andi Watson	Penciller: Cliff Richards; Inker: Joe Pimentel; Colorist: Guy Major	September 29, 1999	Crash Test Demons; Buffy the Vampire Slayer Omnibus Vol. 4
14	"Love Sick Blues"	Andi Watson	Penciller: Cliff Richards; Inker: Joe Pimentel; Colorist: Guy Major	October 27, 1999	Crash Test Demons; Buffy the Vampire Slayer Omnibus Vol. 4
15	"Lost Highway"	Andi Watson	Penciller: Cliff Richards; Inker: Joe Pimentel; Colorist: Guy Major	November 24, 1999	Crash Test Demons; Buffy the Vampire Slayer Omnibus Vol. 4
16	"The Food Chain" (Food Chain, part 2)	Christopher Golden	Penciller: Christian Zanier, Marvin Mariano & Draxhall Jump; Inkers: Jason Minor, Andy Owens & Curtis P. Arnold; Colorist: Guy Major	December 5, 1999	Food Chain; Buffy the Vampire Slayer Omnibus Vol. 3
17	"She's No Lady"	Andi Watson	Penciller: Cliff Richards; Inker: Joe Pimentel; Colorist: Guy Major	January 26, 2000	Pale Reflections; Buffy the Vampire Slayer Omnibus Vol. 4
18	"She's No Lady"	Andi Watson	Penciller: Cliff Richards; Inker: Joe Pimentel; Colorist: Guy Major	February 23, 2000	Pale Reflections; Buffy the Vampire Slayer Omnibus Vol. 4
19	"Old Friend"	Andi Watson	Penciller: Cliff Richards; Inker(s): Joe Pimentel; Colorist: Guy Major	March 22, 2000	Pale Reflections; Buffy the Vampire Slayer Omnibus Vol. 4
20	"Double Cross" (Food Chain, part 3)	Doug Petrie	Penciller(s): Jason Minor; Inker(s): Curtis Arnold; Colorist: Guy Major	April 26, 2000	Food Chain; Buffy the Vampire Slayer Omnibus Vol. 4
21	"The Blood of Carthage"	Christopher Golden	Penciller: Cliff Richards; Inker: Joe Pimentel; Colorist: Guy Major	May 31, 2000	The Blood of Carthage; Buffy the Vampire Slayer Omnibus Vol. 5
22	"The Blood of Carthage"	Christopher Golden	Penciller: Cliff Richards; Inker: Joe Pimentel; Colorist: Guy Major	June 28, 2000	The Blood of Carthage; Buffy the Vampire Slayer Omnibus Vol. 5
23	"The Blood of Carthage"	Christopher Golden	Penciller: Cliff Richards; Inker: Joe Pimentel; Colorist: Guy Major	July 26, 2000	The Blood of Carthage; Buffy the Vampire Slayer Omnibus Vol. 5
24	"The Blood of Carthage"	Christopher Golden	Penciller: Cliff Richards; Inker: Joe Pimentel; Colorist: Guy Major	August 30, 2000	The Blood of Carthage; Buffy the Vampire Slayer Omnibus Vol. 5
25	"The Blood of Carthage"	Christopher Golden	Penciller: Cliff Richards; Inker: Joe Pimentel; Colorist: Guy Major	September 27, 2000	The Blood of Carthage; Buffy the Vampire Slayer Omnibus Vol. 5
26	"The Heart of a Slayer"	Chris Boal	Penciller: Cliff Richards; Inker: Joe Pimentel; Colorist: Guy Major	October 25, 2000	Autumnal; Buffy the Vampire Slayer Omnibus Vol. 5
27	"The Heart of a Slayer"	Chris Boal	Penciller: Cliff Richards; Inker: Joe Pimentel; Colorist: Guy Major	November 29, 2000	Autumnal; Buffy the Vampire Slayer Omnibus Vol. 5
28	"Cemetery of Lost Love"	Tom Fassbender & Jim Pascoe	Penciller: Cliff Richards; Inker: Joe Pimentel; Colorist: Guy Major	December 27, 2000	Autumnal; Buffy the Vampire Slayer Omnibus Vol. 5
29	"Past Lives" (Parts 2 & 4, crossover with Angel series)	Christopher Golden & Tom Sniegoski	Penciller: Cliff Richards & Christian Zanier; Inker: Joe Pimentel; Colorist: Lee Loughridge	January 31, 2001	Past Lives; Buffy the Vampire Slayer Omnibus Vol. 6
30	"Past Lives" (Parts 2 & 4, crossover with Angel series)	Christopher Golden & Tom Sniegoski	Penciller: Cliff Richards & Christian Zanier; Inker: Joe Pimentel; Colorist: Lee Loughridge	February 28, 2001	Past Lives; Buffy the Vampire Slayer Omnibus Vol. 6
31	"Lost & Found"	Tom Fassbender & Jim Pascoe	Penciller: Cliff Richards; Inker: Joe Pimentel; Colorist(s): Dave McCaig	March 28, 2001	Out of the Woodwork; Buffy the Vampire Slayer Omnibus Vol. 6
32	"Invasion"	Tom Fassbender & Jim Pascoe	Penciller: Cliff Richards; Inker: Joe Pimentel; Colorist: Dave McCaig	April 25, 2001	Out of the Woodwork; Buffy the Vampire Slayer Omnibus Vol. 6
33	"Hive Mentality"	Tom Fassbender & Jim Pascoe	Penciller: Cliff Richards; Inker: Joe Pimentel; Colorist: Dave McCaig	May 23, 2001	Out of the Woodwork; Buffy the Vampire Slayer Omnibus Vol. 6
34	"Out Of The Fire, Into The Hive"	Tom Fassbender & Jim Pascoe	Penciller: Cliff Richards; Inker: Joe Pimentel; Colorist: Dave McCaig	June 27, 2001	Out of the Woodwork; Buffy the Vampire Slayer Omnibus Vol. 6
35	"False Memories"	Tom Fassbender & Jim Pascoe	Penciller: Cliff Richards; Inker: Joe Pimentel & Will Conrad; Colorist: Dave McCaig	July 25, 2001	False Memories; Buffy the Vampire Slayer Omnibus Vol. 6
36	"False Memories"	Tom Fassbender & Jim Pascoe	Penciller: Cliff Richards; Inker: Joe Pimentel & Will Conrad; Colorist: Dave McCaig	August 29, 2001	False Memories; Buffy the Vampire Slayer Omnibus Vol. 6
37	"False Memories"	Tom Fassbender & Jim Pascoe	Penciller: Cliff Richards; Inker: Joe Pimentel & Will Conrad; Colorist: Dave McCaig	September 26, 2001	False Memories; Buffy the Vampire Slayer Omnibus Vol. 6
38	"False Memories"	Tom Fassbender & Jim Pascoe	Penciller: Cliff Richards; Inker: Joe Pimentel & Will Conrad; Colorist: Dave McCaig	November 7, 2001	False Memories; Buffy the Vampire Slayer Omnibus Vol. 6
39	"Night of a Thousand Vampires"	Tom Fassbender & Jim Pascoe	Penciller: Cliff Richards; Inker: Joe Pimentel & Will Conrad; Colorist: Digital Chameleon	November 28, 2001	Ugly Little Monsters; Buffy the Vampire Slayer Omnibus Vol. 7
40	"Ugly Little Monsters"	Tom Fassbender & Jim Pascoe	Penciller: Cliff Richards; Inker: Joe Pimentel & Will Conrad; Colorist: Dave McCaig	December 26, 2001	Ugly Little Monsters; Buffy the Vampire Slayer Omnibus Vol. 7
41	"Ugly Little Monsters"	Tom Fassbender & Jim Pascoe	Penciller: Cliff Richards; Inker: Joe Pimentel & Will Conrad; Colorist: Dave McCaig	February 6, 2002	Ugly Little Monsters; Buffy the Vampire Slayer Omnibus Vol. 7
42	"Ugly Little Monsters"	Tom Fassbender & Jim Pascoe	Penciller: Cliff Richards; Inker: Joe Pimentel & Will Conrad; Colorist: Dave McCaig	February 27, 2002	Ugly Little Monsters; Buffy the Vampire Slayer Omnibus Vol. 7
43	"The Death of Buffy"	Tom Fassbender & Jim Pascoe	Penciller: Cliff Richards; Inker: Joe Pimentel & Will Conrad; Colorist: Dave McCaig	April 10, 2002	The Death of Buffy; Buffy the Vampire Slayer Omnibus Vol. 7
44	"The Death of Buffy"	Tom Fassbender & Jim Pascoe	Penciller: Cliff Richards; Inker: Joe Pimentel & Will Conrad; Colorist: Dave McCaig	May 1, 2002	The Death of Buffy; Buffy the Vampire Slayer Omnibus Vol. 7
45	"The Death of Buffy"	Tom Fassbender & Jim Pascoe	Penciller: Cliff Richards; Inker: Joe Pimentel & Will Conrad; Colorist: Dave McCaig	June 5, 2002	The Death of Buffy; Buffy the Vampire Slayer Omnibus Vol. 7
46	"Withdrawal"	Tom Fassbender & Jim Pascoe	Penciller: Paul Lee; Inker(s): Paul Lee; Colorist: Michelle Madsen	June 26, 2002	The Death of Buffy; Buffy the Vampire Slayer Omnibus Vol. 7
47	"Hellmouth to Mouth"	Scott Lobdell & Fabian Nicieza	Penciller: Cliff Richards; Inker: Will Conrad; Colorist: Dave McCaig	August 7, 2002	Note from the Underground; Buffy the Vampire Slayer Omnibus Vol. 7
48	"Hellmouth to Mouth"	Scott Lobdell & Fabian Nicieza	Penciller: Cliff Richards; Inker: Will Conrad; Colorist: Dave McCaig	August 28, 2002	Note from the Underground; Buffy the Vampire Slayer Omnibus Vol. 7
49	"Hellmouth to Mouth"	Scott Lobdell & Fabian Nicieza	Penciller: Cliff Richards; Inker: Will Conrad; Colorist: Dave McCaig	September 25, 2002	Note from the Underground; Buffy the Vampire Slayer Omnibus Vol. 7
50	"Hellmouth to Mouth, Part 4" (Mall Rats)	Scott Lobdell & Fabian Nicieza	Penciller: Cliff Richards; Inker: Will Conrad; Colorist: Dave McCaig	October 30, 2002	Note from the Underground; Buffy the Vampire Slayer Omnibus Vol. 4; Buffy the Vampire Slayer Omnibus Vol. 7
51	"Broken Parts"	Scott Lobdell & Fabian Nicieza	Penciller: Cliff Richards; Inker: Will Conrad; Colorist: Dave McCaig	November 27, 2002	Viva Las Buffy!; Buffy the Vampire Slayer Omnibus Vol. 1
52	"Full House"	Scott Lobdell & Fabian Nicieza	Penciller: Cliff Richards; Inker: Will Conrad; Colorist: Dave McCaig	December 26, 2002	Viva Las Buffy!; Buffy the Vampire Slayer Omnibus Vol. 1
53	"Deuces Wild"	Scott Lobdell & Fabian Nicieza	Penciller: Cliff Richards; Inker: Will Conrad; Colorist: Dave McCaig	February 5, 2003	Viva Las Buffy!; Buffy the Vampire Slayer Omnibus Vol. 1
54	"The Big Fold"	Scott Lobdell & Fabian Nicieza	Penciller: Cliff Richards; Inker: Will Conrad; Colorist: Dave McCaig	February 26, 2003	Viva Las Buffy!; Buffy the Vampire Slayer Omnibus Vol. 1
55	"Dawn and Hoopy the Bear"	Paul Lee	Penciller: Paul Lee; Inker: Paul Lee	March 26, 2003	Slayer, Interrupted; Buffy the Vampire Slayer Omnibus Vol. 1
56	"Slayer, Interrupted"	Scott Lobdell & Fabian Nicieza	Penciller: Cliff Richards; Inker: Will Conrad; Colorist: Dave McCaig	April 30, 2003	Slayer, Interrupted; Buffy the Vampire Slayer Omnibus Vol. 1
57	"Slayer, Interrupted"	Scott Lobdell & Fabian Nicieza	Penciller: Cliff Richards; Inker: Will Conrad; Colorist: Dave McCaig	May 28, 2003	Slayer, Interrupted; Buffy the Vampire Slayer Omnibus Vol. 1
58	"Slayer, Interrupted"	Scott Lobdell & Fabian Nicieza	Penciller: Cliff Richards; Inker: Will Conrad; Colorist: Dave McCaig	June 25, 2003	Slayer, Interrupted; Buffy the Vampire Slayer Omnibus Vol. 1
59	"Slayer, Interrupted"	Scott Lobdell & Fabian Nicieza	Penciller: Cliff Richards; Inker: Will Conrad; Colorist: Dave McCaig	July 23, 2003	Slayer, Interrupted; Buffy the Vampire Slayer Omnibus Vol. 1
60	"A Stake To The Heart"	Fabian Nicieza	Penciller: Cliff Richards; Inker: Will Conrad; Colorist: Michelle Madsen	August 27, 2003	A Stake to the Heart; Buffy the Vampire Slayer Omnibus Vol. 2
61	"A Stake To The Heart"	Fabian Nicieza	Penciller: Cliff Richards; Inker: Will Conrad; Colorist: Michelle Madsen	September 24, 2003	A Stake to the Heart; Buffy the Vampire Slayer Omnibus Vol. 2
62	"A Stake To The Heart"	Fabian Nicieza	Penciller: Cliff Richards; Inker: Will Conrad; Colorist: Michelle Madsen	October 22, 2003	A Stake to the Heart; Buffy the Vampire Slayer Omnibus Vol. 2
63	"A Stake To The Heart"	Fabian Nicieza	Penciller: Cliff Richards; Inker: Will Conrad; Colorist: Michelle Madsen	November 26, 2003	A Stake to the Heart; Buffy the Vampire Slayer Omnibus Vol. 2

=== Buffy specials (1998–2003) ===
Title	Story	Writers	Artists	Release date	Reprinted in
"The Dust Waltz"	—N/a	Dan Brereton	Penciller: Hector Gomez; Inker: Sandu Florea; Colorist: Guy Major	October 14, 1998	Buffy the Vampire Slayer Omnibus Vol. 2
"Buffy the Vampire Slayer"	"Stinger"	Christopher Golden	Penciller: Hector Gomez; Inker: Sandu Florea; Colorist: Guy Major	July 21, 1999 (Note: Released in Wizard.)	Buffy the Vampire Slayer Omnibus Vol. 4
"Buffy the Vampire Slayer 1999 Annual"	"Latest Craze" (Food Chain, part 5)	Christopher Golden and Thomas E. Sniegoski	Penciller: Cliff Richards; Inker: Joe Pimentel; Colorist: Guy Major	August 25, 1999	Food Chain; Buffy the Vampire Slayer Omnibus Vol. 3
"Buffy the Vampire Slayer 1999 Annual"	"Bad Dog" (Food Chain, part 4)	Douglas Petrie	Penciller: Ryan Sook; Inker: Tim Goodyear; Colorist: Guy Major	August 25, 1999	Food Chain; Buffy the Vampire Slayer Omnibus Vol. 4
"Ring of Fire"	—N/a	Doug Petrie	Penciller: Ryan Sook; Inkers: Tim Goodyear and Ryan Sook; Colorist: Dave Stewart	August 30, 2000	Buffy the Vampire Slayer Omnibus Vol. 2
"Giles"	"Beyond the Pale"	Christopher Golden and Thomas E. Sniegoski	Penciller: Eric Powell; Colorist: Guy Major	October 4, 2000	Buffy the Vampire Slayer Omnibus Vol. 6
"City of Despair" (Food Chain, part 8; crossover with Angel)	—N/a	Tom Fassbender and Jim Pascoe	Penciller: Cliff Richards; Inker: Andy Owens; Colorist: Guy Major	November 29, 2000	Food Chain; Buffy the Vampire Slayer Omnibus Vol. 6
"Jonathan"	"Codename: Comrades"	Jane Espenson	Penciller: Cliff Richards; Inker: Andy Owens; Colorist: Guy Major	January 3, 2001	Buffy the Vampire Slayer Omnibus Vol. 6
"Lover's Walk"	"One Small Promise" (Food Chain, part 7)	Tom Fassbender and Jim Pascoe	Penciller: Cliff Richards; Inker: Sandu Florea; Colorist: Guy Major	February 2001	Food Chain; Buffy the Vampire Slayer Omnibus Vol. 6
"Lover's Walk"	"Punish Me With Kisses" (Food Chain, part 6)	Jamie S. Rich and Chynna Clugston-Major	Penciller: Eric Powell; Inker: P. Craig Russell; Colorist: Guy Major	February 2001	Food Chain; Buffy the Vampire Slayer Omnibus Vol. 6
"Lover's Walk"	"Who Made Who?"	Christopher Golden	Penciller: Eric Powell; Inker: P. Craig Russell; Colorist: Guy Major	February 2001	Spike and Dru; Buffy the Vampire Slayer Omnibus Vol. 4
"Lost & Found" (Note: Not to be confused with the comics from the Buffy Classics series.)	—N/a	Fabian Nicieza	Penciller: Cliff Richards; Inker: Joe Pimentel and Will Conrad; Colorist:: Dave McCaig	March 13, 2002	The Death of Buffy; Buffy the Vampire Slayer Omnibus Vol. 7
"Reunion"	—N/a	Jane Espenson	Pencillers: Paul Lee; Brian Horton; Ryan Sook; Chynna Clugston-Major; Randy Green; Rick Ketcham; Eric Powell; Colorist: Guy Major	June 19, 2002	Buffy the Vampire Slayer Omnibus Vol. 7
"Angels We Have Seen on High"	—N/a	Scott Lobdell and Fabian Niecieza	Pencillers: Jeff Matsuda, Hakjoon Kahn and Nolan Obena; Colorist:: Dave McCaig	November 2002	Buffy the Vampire Slayer Omnibus Vol. 2
"Chaos Bleeds"	—N/a	Christopher Golden and Tom Sniegoski	Penciller: Cliff Richards; Inker: Will Conrad; Colorist:: Michelle Madsen	June 6, 2003	Buffy the Vampire Slayer Omnibus Vol. 7

=== Buffy mini-series (1999–2001) ===
Title	Story	Writer(s)	Artist(s)	Release Date	Reprinted in
"The Origin"	3 episodes	Christopher Golden & Dan Brereton	Penciller(s): Joe Bennett Inker(s): Rick Ketcham Colorist(s): Jeromy Cox & Guy Major	January 13, 1999 February 10, 1999 March 24, 1999	The Origin Buffy the Vampire Slayer Omnibus Vol. 1
"Angel"	3 episodes	Christopher Golden	Penciller(s): Hector Gomez Inker(s): Sandu Florea Colorist(s): Guy Major	May 12, 1999 June 9, 1999 March 24, 1999	Angel: The Hollower Buffy the Vampire Slayer Omnibus Vol. 4
"Haunted"	4 episodes	Jane Espenson	Penciller(s): Cliff Richards Inker(s): Julio Ferreira Colorist(s): Jeromy Cox	December 19, 2001 January 16, 2002 February 20, 2002 March 20, 2002	Haunted Buffy the Vampire Slayer Omnibus Vol. 5
"Willow and Tara: WannaBlessedBe"	1 episode	Amber Benson & Christopher Golden	Penciller(s): Terry Moore & Eric Powell Inker(s): HiFi Design Colorist(s): HiFi Design	April, 2001	Willow and Tara Buffy the Vampire Slayer Omnibus Vol. 6
"Willow and Tara: Wilderness"	2 episodes	Amber Benson & Christopher Golden	Penciller(s): AJ & Klebs, Jr. Inker(s): Derek Fridolfs & Fabio Laguna Colorist(s): Michelle Madsen	July–September, 2002	Willow and Tara Buffy the Vampire Slayer Omnibus Vol. 7
"Spike and Dru"	"All's Fair"	James Marsters & Christopher Golden	Penciller(s): Ryan Sook & Eric Powell Inker(s): Drew Geraci Colorist(s): Guy Major	April 14, 1999 October 13, 1999 December 27, 2000	Spike and Dru Buffy the Vampire Slayer Omnibus Vol. 1
"Spike and Dru"	"The Queen of Hearts" "Paint the Town Red"	James Marsters & Christopher Golden	Penciller(s): Ryan Sook & Eric Powell Inker(s): Drew Geraci Colorist(s): Guy Major	April 14, 1999 October 13, 1999 December 27, 2000	Spike and Dru Buffy the Vampire Slayer Omnibus Vol. 2
"Oz"	3 episodes	Christopher Golden	Penciller(s): Logan Lubera Inker(s): Craig Yeun Colorist(s): HALO	July 18, 2001 August 15, 2001 September 19, 2001	Oz Buffy the Vampire Slayer Omnibus Vol. 5

=== Buffy tales (2002–2009) ===
Title	Story	Writer(s)	Artist(s)	Release Date	Reprinted in
"Prologue"		Joss Whedon	Penciller(s): Leinil Francis Yu Inker(s): Dexter Vines Colorist(s): Dave Stewart	February 20, 2002	Tales of the Slayers Tales
"Righteous"		Joss Whedon	Penciller(s): Tim Sale Inker(s): Tim Sale Colorist(s): Lee Loughridge	February 20, 2002	Tales of the Slayers Tales
"The Innocent"		Amber Benson	Penciller(s): Ted Naifeh Inker(s): Ted Naifeh Colorist(s): Dave Stewart	February 20, 2002	Tales of the Slayers Tales
"Presumption"		Jane Espenson	Penciller(s): P. Craig Russell Inker(s): P. Craig Russell Colorist(s): Lovern Kindzierski	February 20, 2002	Tales of the Slayers Tales
"The Glittering World"		David Fury	Penciller(s): Steve Lieber Inker(s): Steve Lieber Colorist(s): Steve Lieber	February 20, 2002	Tales of the Slayers Tales
"Sonnenblume"		Rebecca Rand Kirshner	Penciller(s): Mira Friedmann Inker(s): Mira Friedmann Colorist(s): Mira Friedmann	February 20, 2002	Tales of the Slayers Tales
"Nikki Goes Down!"		Doug Petrie	Penciller(s): Gene Colan Colorist(s): Dave Stewart	February 20, 2002	Tales of the Slayers Tales
"Tales"		Joss Whedon	Penciller(s): Karl Moline Inker(s): Andy Owens Colorist(s): Dave Stewart	February 20, 2002	Tales of the Slayers Tales
"Broken Bottle of Djinn"		Jane Espenson & Douglas Petrie	Penciller(s): Jeff Matsuda & Gene Colan Inker(s): Jeff Matsuda Colorist(s): Dave Stewart	October 16, 2002	Tales
"Drawing on Your Nightmares" (Multi-comic book)	"Dames"	Brett Matthews	Penciller(s): Sean Phillips Colorist(s): Sean Phillips	October, 2003	Tales
"Tales of the Vampires Part 1" (Mini-series)	"The Problem with Vampires"	Drew Goddard	Penciller(s): Paul Lee Inker(s): Derek Fridolfs Colorist(s): Michelle Madsen	December 22, 2003	Tales of the Vampires Tales
"Tales of the Vampires Part 1" (Mini-series)	"Stacy"	Joss Whedon	Penciller(s): Cameron Stewart Inker(s): Derek Fridolfs Colorist(s): Chip Zdarsky	December 22, 2003	Tales of the Vampires Tales
"Tales of the Vampires Part 2" (Mini-series)	"Spot the Vampire"	Jane Espenson	Penciller(s): Scott Morse Inker(s): Scott Morse Colorist(s): Scott Morse	January, 2004	Tales of the Vampires Tales
"Tales of the Vampires Part 2" (Mini-series)	"Jack"	Brett Matthews	Penciller(s): Vatche Mavlian Inker(s): Vatche Mavlian Colorist(s): Michelle Madsen	January, 2004	Tales of the Vampires Tales
"Tales of the Vampires Part 3" (Mini-series)	"Father"	Jane Espenson	Penciller(s): Jason Alexander Inker(s): Jason Alexander Colorist(s): Michelle Madsen	February, 2004	Tales of the Vampires Tales
"Tales of the Vampires Part 3" (Mini-series)	"Antique"	Drew Goddard	Penciller(s): Ben Stenbeck Inker(s): Ben Stenbeck Colorist(s): Ben Stenbeck	February, 2004	Tales of the Vampires Tales
"Tales of the Vampires Part 4" (Mini-series)	"Dust Bowl"	Jane Espenson	Penciller(s): Jeff Parker Inker(s): Jeff Parker Colorist(s): Jeff Parker	March, 2004	Tales of the Vampires Tales
"Tales of the Vampires Part 4" (Mini-series)	"Taking Care of Business"	Ben Edlund	Penciller(s): Ben Edlund Inker(s): Derek Fridolfs Colorist(s): Michelle Madsen	March, 2004	Tales of the Vampires Tales
"Tales of the Vampires Part 5" (Mini-series)	"Some Like It Hot"	Sam Loeb	Penciller(s): Tim Sale Inker(s): Tim Sale Colorist(s): Tim Sale	April, 2004	Tales of the Vampires Tales
"Tales of the Vampires Part 5" (Mini-series)	"Numb"	Brett Matthews	Penciller(s): Cliff Richards Colorist(s): Michelle Madsen	April, 2004	Tales of the Vampires Tales

=== Dark Horse Presents ===
#	Story	Writer(s)	Artist(s)	Release Date	Reprinted in
1998 Annual	"MacGuffins"	J.L. Van Meter	Penciller(s): Luke Ross Inker(s): Rick Ketcham Colorist(s): Guy Major	August 26, 1998	Remaining Sunlight Buffy the Vampire Slayer Omnibus Vol. 2
#141	"Hello Moon"	Dan Brereton & Christopher Golden	Penciller(s): Joe Bennett Inker(s): Jim Amash Colorist(s): Guy Major	March 17, 1999	Bad Blood Buffy the Vampire Slayer Omnibus Vol. 4
#141	"Cursed"	Christopher Golden	Penciller(s): Hector Gomez Inker(s): Sandu Florea Colorist(s): Guy Major	March 17, 1999	The Hollower Buffy the Vampire Slayer Omnibus Vol. 4
#141	"Dead Love"	Andi Watson	Penciller(s): David Perrin Inker(s): Sandu Florea Colorist(s): Guy Major	March 17, 1999	Buffy the Vampire Slayer Omnibus Vol. 4
#150	"Killing Time"	Doug Petrie	Penciller(s): Cliff Richards Inker(s): Joe Pimentel Colorist(s): Guy Major	January 19, 2000	Pale Reflections Buffy the Vampire Slayer Omnibus Vol. 5
2000 Annual	"Take Back the Night"	Tom Fassbender & Jim Pascoe	Penciller(s): Cliff Richards Inker(s): Joe Pimentel Colorist(s): Dave McCaig	June 21, 2000	Out of the Woodwork Buffy the Vampire Slayer Omnibus Vol. 5
MySpace #18	"Harmony Bites"	Jane Espenson	Karl Moline	January 2009	Predators and Prey
MySpace #19	"Vampy Cat Play Friend"	Steven S. DeKnight	Camilla d'Errico	February 2009	Predators and Prey
MySpace #24	"Always Darkest"	Joss Whedon	Jo Chen	July 2009	Retreat
MySpace #25	"Harmony Comes to the Nation"	Jane Espenson	Karl Moline	August 2009	Retreat
MySpace #31	"Carpe Noctem, Part One"	Jackie Kessler	Penciller(s): Paul Lee Inker(s): Paul Lee Colorist(s): Dave Stewart	February 1, 2010	Tales
MySpace #32	"Carpe Noctem, Part Two"	Jackie Kessler	Penciller(s): Paul Lee Inker(s): Paul Lee Colorist(s): Dave Stewart	March, 2010	Tales

=== Dark Horse Extra ===
#	Story	Writer(s)	Artist(s)	Release Date	Reprinted in
#47–48	"Demonology Menagerie"	Andi Watson	Penciller(s): Andi Watson Inker(s): Andi Watson Colorist(s): Andi Watson	May 8, 2002 June 5, 2002	Willow and Tara Buffy the Vampire Slayer Omnibus Vol. 6
#49–50	"Rock 'N' Roll All Night (and Sleep Every Day)"	Jamie S. Rich & Chynna Clugston	Penciller(s): Chynna Clugston Colorist(s): Guy Major	July 17, 2002 August 7, 2002	Buffy the Vampire Slayer Omnibus Vol. 7

=== TV Guide ===
#	Story	Writer(s)	Artist(s)	Release Date	Reprinted in
Nov 21–27	"Dance With Me"	Christopher Golden	Penciller(s): Hector Gomez Inker(s): Sandu Florea Colorist(s): Guy Major	November 17, 1998	Buffy the Vampire Slayer Omnibus Vol. 3

=== Trade paperbacks ===
1. Compilations of most of the material listed above:

- The Remaining Sunlight
- Uninvited Guests
- Bad Blood
- Crash Test Demons
- Pale Reflections
- The Blood of Carthage
- Food Chain
- Past Lives
- Autumnal
- Out of the Woodwork
- False Memories
- Ugly Little Monsters
- Haunted
- The Death of Buffy
- Note from the Underground
- Viva Las Buffy!
- Slayer, Interrupted
- A Stake to the Heart
- Spike and Dru
- Willow and Tara
- Oz
- Tales of the Slayers
- Tales of the Vampires

2. Compilations of all of the material listed above:

- Buffy the Vampire Slayer Omnibus Vol. 1
- Buffy the Vampire Slayer Omnibus Vol. 2
- Buffy the Vampire Slayer Omnibus Vol. 3
- Buffy the Vampire Slayer Omnibus Vol. 4
- Buffy the Vampire Slayer Omnibus Vol. 5
- Buffy the Vampire Slayer Omnibus Vol. 6
- Buffy the Vampire Slayer Omnibus Vol. 7
- Tales

=== Season Eight (2007–2011) ===
The series serves as a canonical continuation of the television series Buffy the Vampire Slayer, and follows the events of that show's final televised season. It is produced by Joss Whedon, who wrote or co-wrote three of the series arcs and several one-shot stories. The series was followed by Season Nine in 2011.

#	Title	Writer(s)	Artist(s)	Release Date	Reprinted in
1–4	"The Long Way Home" (4 episodes)	Joss Whedon	Georges Jeanty	March 14, 2007 April 4, 2007 May 2, 2007 June 6, 2007	The Long Way Home
5	"The Chain"	Joss Whedon	Paul Lee	July 25, 2007	The Long Way Home
6–9	"No Future for You" (4 episodes)	Brian K. Vaughan	Georges Jeanty	September 5, 2007 October 3, 2007 November 7, 2007 December 5, 2007	No Future for You
10	"Anywhere but Here"	Joss Whedon	Cliff Richards	January 2, 2008	No Future for You
11	"A Beautiful Sunset"	Joss Whedon	Georges Jeanty	February 6, 2008	Wolves at the Gate
12–15	"Wolves at the Gate" (4 episodes)	Drew Goddard	Georges Jeanty	March 5, 2008 April 2, 2008 May 7, 2008 June 4, 2008	Wolves at the Gate
16–19	"Time of Your Life" (4 episodes)	Joss Whedon	Karl Moline	July 2, 2008 August 6, 2008 September 3, 2008 November 26, 2008	Time of Your Life
20	"After These Messages... We'll Be Right Back!"	Jeph Loeb	Georges Jeanty & Eric Wight	December 17, 2008	Time of Your Life
21	"Harmonic Divergence"	Jane Espenson	Georges Jeanty	January 7, 2009	Predators and Prey
22	"Swell"	Steven S. DeKnight	Georges Jeanty	February 4, 2009	Predators and Prey
23	"Predators and Prey"	Drew Z. Greenberg	Georges Jeanty	March 4, 2009	Predators and Prey
24	"Safe"	Jim Krueger	Cliff Richards	April 1, 2009	Predators and Prey
25	"Living Doll"	Doug Petrie	Georges Jeanty	May 6, 2009	Predators and Prey
26–30	"Retreat" (5 episodes)	Jane Espenson	Georges Jeanty	July 1, 2009 August 5, 2009 September 2, 2009 October 7, 2009 November 4, 2009	Retreat
31	"Turbulence"	Joss Whedon	Georges Jeanty	January 13, 2010	Twilight
32–35	"Twilight" (4 episodes)	Brad Meltzer	Georges Jeanty	February 3, 2010 March 3, 2010 April 7, 2010 May 5, 2010	Twilight
36–40	"Last Gleaming" (5 episodes)	Joss Whedon & Scott Allie	Georges Jeanty	September 1, 2010 October 6, 2010 November 3, 2010 December 1, 2010 January 19, 2011	Last Gleaming

==== Specials ====
Title	Story	Writer(s)	Artist(s)	Release Date	Reprinted in
"Tales of the Vampires"	"The Thrill"	Becky Cloonan	Penciller(s): Vasilis Lolos Inker(s): Vasilis Lolos Colorist(s): Dave Stewart	June 3, 2009	Tales
"Willow"	"Goddesses and Monsters"	Joss Whedon	Penciller(s): Karl Moline Inker(s): Karl Moline Colorist(s): Dave Stewart	December 23, 2009	Twilight
"Riley"	"Commitment through Distance, Virtue through Sin"	Jane Espenson	Penciller(s): Karl Moline Inker(s): Karl Moline Colorist(s): Dave Stewart	August 18, 2010	Last Gleaming

==== Trade paperbacks ====
- The Long Way Home
- No Future for You
- Wolves at the Gate
- Time of Your Life
- Predators and Prey
- Retreat
- Twilight
- Last Gleaming

=== Season Nine (2011–2013) ===
When Buffy the Vampire Slayer Season Eight was finished, Dark Horse Comics decided to publish a new comic season of Buffy. They also decided to follow up the series Angel: After the Fall with the publication of Angel & Faith as a part of Buffy the Vampire Slayer Season Nine after IDW Publishing lost the license to Angel and it went to Dark Horse Comics.

==== Buffy ====
#	Title	Writer(s)	Artist(s)	Release Date	Reprinted in
1–4	"Freefall" (4 episodes)	Joss Whedon & Andrew Chambliss	Georges Jeanty	September 14, 2011 October 12, 2011 November 9, 2011 December 14, 2011	Freefall
5	"Slayer, Interrupted"	Andrew Chambliss	Karl Moline	January 11, 2012	Freefall
6–7	"On Your Own" (2 episodes)	Andrew Chambliss	Georges Jeanty	February 8, 2012 March 14, 2012	On Your Own
8–10	"Apart (of Me)" (3 episodes)	Andrew Chambliss & Scott Allie	Cliff Richards	April 11, 2012 May 9, 2012 June 13, 2012	On Your Own
11–13	"Guarded" (3 episodes)	Andrew Chambliss	Georges Jeanty	July 11, 2012 August 8, 2012 September 12, 2012	Guarded
14–15	"Billy the Vampire Slayer" (2 episodes)	Jane Espenson & Drew Z. Greenberg	Karl Moline & Ben Dewey	October 10, 2012 November 14, 2012	Guarded
16–19	"Welcome to the Team" (4 episodes)	Andrew Chambliss	Georges Jeanty	December 12, 2012 January 9, 2013 February 13, 2013 March 13, 2013	Welcome to the Team
20	"The Watcher"	Andrew Chambliss	Karl Moline	April 10, 2013	Welcome to the Team
21–25	"The Core" (5 episodes)	Andrew Chambliss	Georges Jeanty	May 8, 2013 June 12, 2013 July 10, 2013 August 14, 2013 September 11, 2013	The Core

===== Trade paperbacks =====
- Freefall
- On Your Own
- Guarded
- Welcome to the Team
- The Core

==== Angel & Faith ====
#	Title	Writer(s)	Artist(s)	Release Date	Reprinted in
1–4	"Live Through This" (4 episodes)	Christos Gage	Rebekah Isaacs	August 31, 2011 September 28, 2011 October 26, 2011 November 30, 2011	Live Through This
5	"In Perfect Harmony"	Christos Gage	Rebekah Isaacs	December 28, 2011	Live Through This
6–9	"Daddy Issues" (4 episodes)	Christos Gage	Rebekah Isaacs	January 25, 2012 February 29, 2012 March 28, 2012 April 25, 2012	Daddy Issues
10	"Women of a Certain Age"	Christos Gage	Rebekah Isaacs	May 30, 2012	Daddy Issues
11–14	"Family Reunion" (4 episodes)	Christos Gage	Rebekah Isaacs	June 27, 2012 July 25, 2012 August 29, 2012 September 26, 2012	Family Reunion
15	"The Hero of His Own Story"	Christos Gage	Rebekah Isaacs	October 31, 2012	Family Reunion
16–19	"Death and Consequences" (4 episodes)	Christos Gage	Rebekah Isaacs	November 28, 2012 December 19, 2012 January 30, 2013 February 27, 2013	Death and Consequences
20	"Spike and Faith"	Christos Gage	Rebekah Isaacs	March 27, 2013	Death and Consequences
21–25	"What You Want, Not What You Need" (5 episodes)	Christos Gage	Rebekah Isaacs	April 24, 2013 May 29, 2013 June 26, 2013 July 31, 2013 August 28, 2013	What You Want, Not What You Need

===== Trade paperbacks =====
- Live Through This
- Daddy Issues
- Family Reunion
- Death and Consequences
- What You Want, Not What You Need

==== Spike: A Dark Place ====
#	Title	Writer(s)	Artist(s)	Release Date	Reprinted in
1–5	"A Dark Place" (5 episodes)	Victor Gischler	Paul Lee	August 22, 2012 September 19, 2012 October 24, 2012 November 21, 2012 January 23, 2013	Spike: A Dark Place

===== Trade paperback =====
- Spike: A Dark Place

==== Willow: Wonderland ====
#	Title	Writer(s)	Artist(s)	Release Date	Reprinted in
1–5	"Wonderland" (5 episodes)	Jeff Parker	Brian Ching	November 7, 2012 December 5, 2012 January 2, 2013 February 6, 2013 March 6, 2013	Willow: Wonderland

===== Trade paperback =====
- Willow: Wonderland

=== Season Ten (2014–2016) ===
Season Ten is a Buffy comic series published after Buffy the Vampire Slayer Season Nine.

==== Buffy ====
#	Title	Writer(s)	Artist(s)	Release Date	Reprinted in
1–5	"New Rules" (5 episodes)	Christos Gage & Nicholas Brendon	Rebekah Isaacs	March 19, 2014 April 23, 2014 May 21, 2014 June 18, 2014 July 23, 2014	New Rules
6–7	"I Wish" (2 episodes)	Christos Gage & Nicholas Brendon	Karl Moline & Cliff Richards	August 20, 2014 September 17, 2014	I Wish
8–9	"Return To Sunnydale" (2 episodes)	Christos Gage	Rebekah Isaacs & Richard Corben	October 22, 2014 November 19, 2014	I Wish
10	"Day Off (or Harmony In My Head)"	Christos Gage	Rebekah Isaacs	December 24, 2014	I Wish
11–13	"Love Dares You" (3 episodes)	Christos Gage & Nicholas Brendon	Megan Levens	January 21, 2015 February 18, 2015 March 18, 2015	Love Dares You
14–15	"Relationship Status: Complicated" (2 episodes)	Christos Gage	Rebekah Isaacs	April 22, 2015 May 20, 2015	Love Dares You
16–18	"Old Demons" (3 episodes)	Christos Gage	Rebekah Isaacs	June 17, 2015 July 22, 2015 August 19, 2015	Old Demons
19	"Freaky Giles Day"	Christos Gage & Nicholas Brendon	Rebekah Isaacs	September 23, 2015	Old Demons
20	"Triggers"	Christos Gage	Megan Levens	October 21, 2015	Old Demons
21–25	"In Pieces on the Ground" (5 episodes)	Christos Gage	Rebekah Isaacs & Megan Levens	November 18, 2015 December 23, 2015 January 20, 2016 February 17, 2016 March 23, 2016	Pieces on the Ground
26	"Home Sweet Hell"	Christos Gage	Rebekah Isaacs	April 20, 2016	Own It
27	"The Centre Cannot Hold"	Christos Gage	Rebekah Isaacs	May 18, 2016	Own It
28	"Taking Ownership"	Christos Gage	Rebekah Isaacs	June 22, 2016	Own It
29	"Own It, Part Dört"	Christos Gage	Rebekah Isaacs	July 20, 2016	Own It
30	"Own It, Part Beş"	Christos Gage	Rebekah Isaacs	August 24, 2016	Own It

===== Trade paperbacks =====
- New Rules
- I Wish
- Love Dares You
- Old Demons
- Pieces on the Ground
- Own It

==== Angel & Faith ====
#	Title	Writer(s)	Artist(s)	Release Date	Reprinted in
1–4	"Where the River Meets the Sea" (4 episodes)	Victor Gischler	Will Conrad	April 2, 2014 May 7, 2014 June 4, 2014 July 2, 2014	Where the River Meets the Sea
5	"Old Habits"	Victor Gischler	Derlis Santacruz	August 6, 2014	Where the River Meets the Sea
6–10	"Lost & Found" (5 episodes)	Victor Gischler	Will Conrad	September 3, 2014 October 1, 2014 November 5, 2014 December 3, 2014 January 7, 2015	Lost and Found
11–14	"United" (4 episodes)	Victor Gischler	Will Conrad	February 4, 2015 March 4, 2015 April 1, 2015 May 6, 2015	United
15	"Fight or Flight"	Kel McDonald	Cliff Richards	June 3, 2015	United
16–18	"Those Who Can't Teach" (3 episodes)	Victor Gischler	Cliff Richards	July 1, 2015 August 5, 2015 September 2, 2015	A Little More Than Kin
19–20	"A Little More Than Kin" (2 episodes)	Victor Gischler	Will Conrad	October 7, 2015 November 4, 2015	A Little More Than Kin
21–25	"A Tale of Two Families" (5 episodes)	Victor Gischler	Will Conrad	December 2, 2015 January 6, 2016 February 3, 2016 March 2, 2016 April 6, 2016	A Tale Of Two Families

===== Trade paperbacks =====
- Where the River Meets the Sea
- Lost and Found
- United
- A Little More Than Kin
- A Tale Of Two Families

=== Season Eleven (2016–2018) ===
Buffy the Vampire Slayer Season Eleven is the sequel to the Season Ten comic book series, a canonical continuation of the television series Buffy the Vampire Slayer. Buffy & Angel consist of only 12 issues per series, a much shorter run than the previous seasons, while the miniseries, Giles, runs for 4 issues. The series was published by Dark Horse Comics and began on November 23, 2016.

The series was concluded with Season Twelve which ran from June to September 2018.

==== Publication ====
===== Buffy the Vampire Slayer Season Eleven =====
====== Single issues ======
Title	Issue #	Release date
"Part I: The Spread of Their Evil"	1	November 23, 2016
Writer: Christos Gage		Penciller: Rebekah Isaacs
"Part II: In Time of Crisis"	2	December 21, 2016
Writer: Christos Gage		Penciller: Rebekah Isaacs
"Part III: A House Divided"	3	January 25, 2017
Writer: Christos Gage		Penciller: Rebekah Isaacs
"Part IV: Desperate Times"	4	February 15, 2017
Writer: Christos Gage		Penciller: Georges Jeanty
"Part V: Desperate Measures"	5	March 22, 2017
Writer: Christos Gage		Penciller: Georges Jeanty
"Part VI: Back to the Wall"	6	April 19, 2017
Writer: Christos Gage		Penciller: Rebekah Isaacs
"Part VII: Disempowered"	7	May 24, 2017
Writer: Christos Gage		Penciller: Rebekah Isaacs
"Part VIII: Ordinary People"	8	June 21, 2017
Writer: Christos Gage		Penciller: Rebekah Isaacs
"Part IX: The Great Escape"	9	July 19, 2017
Writer: Christos Gage		Penciller: Georges Jeanty
"Part X: Crimes Against Nature"	10	August 30, 2017
Writer: Christos Gage		Penciller: Megan Levens
"Part XI: Revelations"	11	September 27, 2017
Writer: Christos Gage		Penciller: Rebekah Isaacs
"Part XII: One Girl In All The World"	12	October 25, 2017
Writer: Christos Gage		Penciller: Rebekah Isaacs

====== Trade paperbacks ======
Volume	Title	Issues collected	Release date	ISBN
1	"The Spread of Their Evil"	Season Eleven #1–6	August 2, 2017	978-1506702742
2	"One Girl in All the World"	Season Eleven #7–12	February 7, 2018	978-1506702926

===== Angel Season Eleven =====
====== Single issues ======
Title	Issue #	Release date
"Out of the Past - Part I"	1	January 18, 2017
Writer: Corinna Bechko		Penciller: Geraldo Borges
"Out of the Past - Part II"	2	February 15, 2017
Writer: Corinna Bechko		Penciller: Geraldo Borges
"Out of the Past - Part III"	3	March 19, 2017
Writer: Corinna Bechko		Penciller: Geraldo Borges
"Out of the Past - Part IV"	4	April 19, 2017
Writer: Corinna Bechko		Penciller: Geraldo Borges
"Time and Tide - Part I"	5	May 24, 2017
Writer: Corinna Bechko		Penciller: Ze Carlos
"Time and Tide - Part II"	6	June 21, 2017
Writer: Corinna Bechko		Penciller: Ze Carlos
"Time and Tide - Part III"	7	July 19, 2017
Writer: Corinna Bechko		Penciller: Ze Carlos
"Time and Tide - Part IV"	8	August 30, 2017
Writer: Corinna Bechko		Penciller: Ze Carlos
"Dark Reflections - Part I"	9	September 27, 2017
Writer: Corinna Bechko		Penciller: Geraldo Borges
"Dark Reflections - Part II"	10	October 25, 2017
Writer: Corinna Bechko		Penciller: Geraldo Borges
"Dark Reflections - Part III"	11	November 22, 2017
Writer: Corinna Bechko		Penciller: Geraldo Borges
"Dark Reflections - Part IV"	12	December 20, 2017
Writer: Corinna Bechko		Penciller: Geraldo Borges

====== Trade paperbacks ======
Volume	Title	Issues collected	Release date	ISBN
1	"Out of the Past"	Out of the Past (1–4)	August 9, 2017	978-1506703466
2	"Time and Tide"	Time and Tide (5–8)	January 3, 2018	978-1506703473
3	"Dark Reflections"	Dark Reflections (9–12)	April 4, 2018	978-1506703879

===== Giles Season Eleven =====
====== Single issues ======
Title	Issue #	Release date
Girl Blue, Part I	1	February 28, 2018
Writer: Joss Whedon & Erika Alexander		Penciller: Jon Lam
Girl Blue, Part II	2	March 28, 2018
Writer: Joss Whedon & Erika Alexander		Penciller: Jon Lam
Girl Blue, Part III: You Can't Be Told	3	April 25, 2018
Writer: Joss Whedon & Erika Alexander		Penciller: Jon Lam
Girl Blue, Part IV	4	May 23, 2018
Writer: Joss Whedon & Erika Alexander		Penciller: Jon Lam

====== Trade paperbacks ======
Volume	Title	Issues collected	Release date	ISBN
1	"Girl Blue"	Girl Blue (1–4)	September 5, 2018	978-1506707433

=== Season Twelve (2018) ===
#	Title	Writer(s)	Artist(s)	Release Date	Reprinted in
1–4	"The Reckoning" (4 episodes)	Christos Gage & Joss Whedon	Georges Jeanty	June 20, 2018; July 18, 2018; August 22, 2018; September 19, 2018	The Reckoning

==== Trade paperbacks ====
- The Reckoning

=== Fray (2001–2003) ===
Fray is an eight-issue comic book limited series, a futuristic spin-off of the television series Buffy the Vampire Slayer. Written by Buffy creator Joss Whedon, the series follows a Slayer named Melaka Fray, a chosen one in a time where vampires (called "lurks") are returning to the slums of New York City, and the rich-poor divide is even greater. Volume one is drawn by Karl Moline (pencils) and Andy Owens (inks).

#	Title	Writer(s)	Artist(s)	Release Date	Reprinted in
1	"Big City Girl"	Joss Whedon	Penciller(s): Karl Moline Inker(s): Andy Owens Colorist(s): Dave Stewart	June 6, 2001	Fray: Future Slayer
2	"The Calling"	Joss Whedon	Penciller(s): Karl Moline Inker(s): Andy Owens Colorist(s): Dave Stewart	July 4, 2001	Fray: Future Slayer
3	"Ready, Steady ..."	Joss Whedon	Penciller(s): Karl Moline Inker(s): Andy Owens Colorist(s): Dave Stewart	August 1, 2001	Fray: Future Slayer
4	"Out of the Past"	Joss Whedon	Penciller(s): Karl Moline Inker(s): Andy Owens Colorist(s): Dave Stewart	October 17, 2001	Fray: Future Slayer
5	"The Worst of It"	Joss Whedon	Penciller(s): Karl Moline Inker(s): Andy Owens Colorist(s): Dave Stewart	November 5, 2001	Fray: Future Slayer
6	"Alarums"	Joss Whedon	Penciller(s): Karl Moline Inker(s): Andy Owens Colorist(s): Dave Stewart	March 27, 2002	Fray: Future Slayer
7	"The Gateway"	Joss Whedon	Penciller(s): Karl Moline Inker(s): Andy Owens Colorist(s): Dave Stewart	April 23, 2003	Fray: Future Slayer
8	"All Hell"	Joss Whedon	Penciller(s): Karl Moline Inker(s): Andy Owens Colorist(s): Dave Stewart	August 26, 2003	Fray: Future Slayer

==== Trade paperbacks ====
- Fray: Future Slayer

== Boom! Studios (2019–2024) ==
In 2019, a new Buffy the Vampire Slayer comic book series was released by Boom! Studios. The series was a reboot with no continuity to the television series or previous comics. Despite being set in an alternate modern-day continuity, the likenesses of the series' actors are still used to represent their respective characters.

=== Main series (2019–2022) ===
#	Title	Writer(s)	Artist(s)	Release Date	Reprinted in
1–4	High School is Hell (4 issues)	Jordie Bellaire	Dan Mora	January 9, 2019; February 13, 2019; March 13, 2019; April 17, 2019	Buffy the Vampire Slayer: High School is Hell
5–8	Once Bitten (4 issues)	Jordie Bellaire	David López	June 5, 2019; July 3, 2019; August 7, 2019; September 4, 2019	Buffy the Vampire Slayer: Once Bitten
9–12	From Beneath You (4 issues)	Jordie Bellaire	David López	November 13, 2019; December 4, 2019; January 1, 2020; February 5, 2020	Buffy the Vampire Slayer: From Beneath You
13–16	Frenemies (4 issues)	Jordie Bellaire	Rosemary Valero-O'Connell	March 4, 2020	Buffy the Vampire Slayer: Frenemies
13–16	Frenemies (4 issues)	Jordie Bellaire	Julian López with Moisés Hildalgo	May 20, 2020	Buffy the Vampire Slayer: Frenemies
13–16	Frenemies (4 issues)	Jordie Bellaire	Ramon Bachs	July 1, 2020; August 5, 2020	Buffy the Vampire Slayer: Frenemies
17–20	The Biggest Bad (4 issues)	Jordie Bellaire & Jeremy Lambert	David López	September 2, 2020	Buffy the Vampire Slayer: The Biggest Bad
17–20	The Biggest Bad (4 issues)	Jordie Bellaire & Jeremy Lambert	Ramon Bachs	October 7, 2020; November 4, 2020	Buffy the Vampire Slayer: The Biggest Bad
21–22	Secrets of the Slayer (2 issues)	Jordie Bellaire & Jeremy Lambert	Andrés Genolet	January 6, 2021	Buffy the Vampire Slayer: Secrets of the Slayer
21–22	Secrets of the Slayer (2 issues)	Jordie Bellaire & Jeremy Lambert	Ramon Bachs	February 3, 2021	Buffy the Vampire Slayer: Secrets of the Slayer
23–26	The World Without Shrimp (4 issues)	Jordie Bellaire & Jeremy Lambert	Ramon Bachs	March 3, 2021; April 7, 2021; May 5, 2021	Buffy the Vampire Slayer: The World Without Shrimp
23–26	The World Without Shrimp (4 issues)	Jeremy Lambert	Marianna Ignazzi	June 2, 2021	Buffy the Vampire Slayer: The World Without Shrimp
27–28	A Rainbow upon Her Head (2 issues)	Jeremy Lambert	Carmelo Zagaria	July 7, 2021	Buffy the Vampire Slayer: A Rainbow upon Her Head
27–28	A Rainbow upon Her Head (2 issues)	Jeremy Lambert	Valentina Pinti	August 4, 2021	Buffy the Vampire Slayer: A Rainbow upon Her Head
29–32	Forget Me Not (4 issues)	Jeremy Lambert	Marianna Ignazzi	September 1, 2021; October 6, 2021; November 17, 2021; December 1, 2021	Buffy the Vampire Slayer: Forget Me Not
33–34	We Are the Slayer (2 issues)	Jeremy Lambert	Valentina Pinti	January 5, 2022; February 2, 2022	Buffy the Vampire Slayer: We Are the Slayer

==== Trade paperbacks ====
- High School is Hell
- Once Bitten
- From Beneath You
- Frenemies
- The Biggest Bad
- Secrets of the Slayer
- The World Without Shrimp
- A Rainbow upon Her Head
- Forget Me Not
- We Are the Slayer

=== One Shots (2019–2023) ===
Title	Story	Writer(s)	Artist(s)	Release Date	Reprinted in
"Chosen Ones" (one-shot)	"The Mission"	Mairghread Scott	Ornella Savarese	August 28, 2019	Buffy the Vampire Slayer: Chosen Ones
"Chosen Ones" (one-shot)	"The Eating of Men"	Celia Lowenthal		August 28, 2019	Buffy the Vampire Slayer: Chosen Ones
"Chosen Ones" (one-shot)	"Behind the Mask"	Alexa Sharpe		August 28, 2019	Buffy the Vampire Slayer: Chosen Ones
"Every Generation" (one-shot)	"Where All Paths Lead"	Nilah Magruder	Lauren Knight	June 3, 2020	Buffy the Vampire Slayer: Chosen Ones
"Every Generation" (one-shot)	"The Hilot of 1910"	Morgan Beem	Morgan Beem and Lauren Garcia	June 3, 2020	Buffy the Vampire Slayer: Chosen Ones
"Every Generation" (one-shot)	"The Sisters of Angelus"	Caitlin Yarsky		June 3, 2020	Buffy the Vampire Slayer: Chosen Ones
"Faith" (one-shot)		Jeremy Lambert	Eleonora Carlini	February 24, 2021	Buffy the Vampire Slayer: Secrets of the Slayer
"Tea Time" (one-shot)		Mirka Andolfo	Siya Oum	June 30, 2021	Buffy the Vampire Slayer: A Rainbow upon Her Head
"The 25th Anniversary" (one-shot)	"We Are The Slayer: Epilogue"	Jeremy Lambert	Claudia Balboni	March 30, 2022	Buffy the Vampire Slayer: We Are The Slayer
"The 25th Anniversary" (one-shot)	"Wondrous and Surprising"	Lilah Sturges	Claire Roe	March 30, 2022	Buffy the Vampire Slayer: Buffy '97
"The 25th Anniversary" (one-shot)	"Is This What I Wanted"	Danny Lore	Marianna Ignazzi	March 30, 2022	Buffy the Vampire Slayer: Buffy '97
"The 25th Anniversary" (one-shot)	"Mirrors Don't Lie"	Casey Gilly	Bayleigh Underwood	March 30, 2022	Buffy the Vampire Slayer: Buffy '97
"The 25th Anniversary" (one-shot)	"Trust the Process"	Sarah Gailey	Carlos Olivares	March 30, 2022	The Vampire Slayer: Volume 1
"Buffy '97" (one-shot)		Jeremy Lambert	Marianna Ignazzi	June 29, 2022	Buffy the Vampire Slayer: Buffy '97
"The Last Vampire Slayer: Special" (one-shot)		Casey Gilly	Joe Jaro; Maria Keane; Lea Caballero	March 1, 2023	Buffy the Vampire Slayer: The Lost Summers
"The Lost Summer" (one-shot)		Casey Gilly	Lauren Knight	May 3, 2023	Buffy the Vampire Slayer: The Lost Summers

=== Willow (2020) ===
#	Title	Writer(s)	Artist(s)	Release Date	Reprinted in
1	"You Don't Have to Go Home"	Mariko Tamaki	Natacha Bustos	June 10, 2020	Willow
2	"Belong"	Mariko Tamaki	Natacha Bustos	August 12, 2020	Willow
3	"The Best Bean"	Mariko Tamaki	Natacha Bustos	September 9, 2020	Willow
4	"The Thread"	Mariko Tamaki	Natacha Bustos	October 14, 2020	Willow
5	"Stay"	Mariko Tamaki	Natacha Bustos	November 18, 2020	Willow

==== Trade paperbacks ====
- Willow

=== Hellmouth (2019–2020) ===
#	Title	Writer(s)	Artist(s)	Release Date	Reprinted in
1–5	"Hellmouth" (5 episodes)	Jordie Bellaire & Jeremy Lambert	Eleonora Carlini	October 9, 2019; November 13, 2019; December 11, 2019; January 8, 2020; February 12, 2020	Buffy the Vampire Slayer: Hellmouth

==== Trade paperbacks ====
- Buffy the Vampire Slayer: Hellmouth

=== Buffy the Last Vampire Slayer ===
#	Title	Writer(s)	Artist(s)	Release Date	Reprinted in
1–4	"The Last Vampire Slayer Vol. 1"	Casey Gilly	Joe Jaro	December 8, 2021; January 12, 2022; February 9, 2022; March 9, 2022	Buffy the Last Vampire Slayer
1-5	"The Last Vampire Slayer Vol. 2"	Casey Gilly	Oriol Roig	August 2, 2023; September 6, 2023; October 4, 2023; November 1, 2023 December 6, 2023	

==== Trade Paperbacks ====
- Buffy the Last Vampire Slayer

=== The Vampire Slayer (2022–2023) ===
#	Title	Writer(s)	Artist(s)	Release Date	Reprinted in
1	Episode 1	Sarah Gailey	Michael Shelfer	April 20, 2022	The Vampire Slayer: Volume 1
2	Episode 2	Sarah Gailey	Sonia Liao	May 25, 2022	The Vampire Slayer: Volume 1
3	Episode 3	Sarah Gailey	Michael Shelfer	June 29, 2022	The Vampire Slayer: Volume 1
4	Episode 4	Sarah Gailey	Puste	July 27, 2022	The Vampire Slayer: Volume 1
5	Episode 5	Sarah Gailey	Sonia Liao	August 31, 2022	The Vampire Slayer: Volume 2
6	Episode 6	Sarah Gailey	Sonia Liao	September 28, 2022	The Vampire Slayer: Volume 2
7	Episode 7	Sarah Gailey	Claudia Balboni	October 26, 2022	The Vampire Slayer: Volume 2
8	Episode 8	Sarah Gailey	Claudia Balboni	November 23, 2022	The Vampire Slayer: Volume 2
9	Episode 9	Sarah Gailey	Hannah Templer	December 21, 2022	The Vampire Slayer: Volume 3
10	Episode 10	Sarah Gailey	Hannah Templer	January 18, 2023	The Vampire Slayer: Volume 3
11	Episode 11	Sarah Gailey	Hannah Templer	February 15, 2023	The Vampire Slayer: Volume 3
12	Episode 12	Sarah Gailey	Hannah Templer	March 15, 2023	The Vampire Slayer: Volume 3
13	Episode 13	Sarah Gailey	Kath Lobo	April 19, 2023	The Vampire Slayer: Volume 4
14	Episode 14	Sarah Gailey	Kath Lobo	May 17, 2023	The Vampire Slayer: Volume 4
15	Episode 15	Sarah Gailey	Kath Lobo	June 21, 2023	The Vampire Slayer: Volume 4
16	Episode 16	Sarah Gailey	Kath Lobo	July 19, 2023	The Vampire Slayer: Volume 4

==== Trade paperbacks ====
- The Vampire Slayer: Volume 1
- The Vampire Slayer: Volume 2
- The Vampire Slayer: Volume 3
- The Vampire Slayer: Volume 4

== Comics by writer ==
See Buffyverse comics#Comics by writer

== See also ==
- List of feminist comic books
- Portrayal of women in comics
