= Sandu Florea =

Romanian-American comic book and comic strip creator (born 1946)

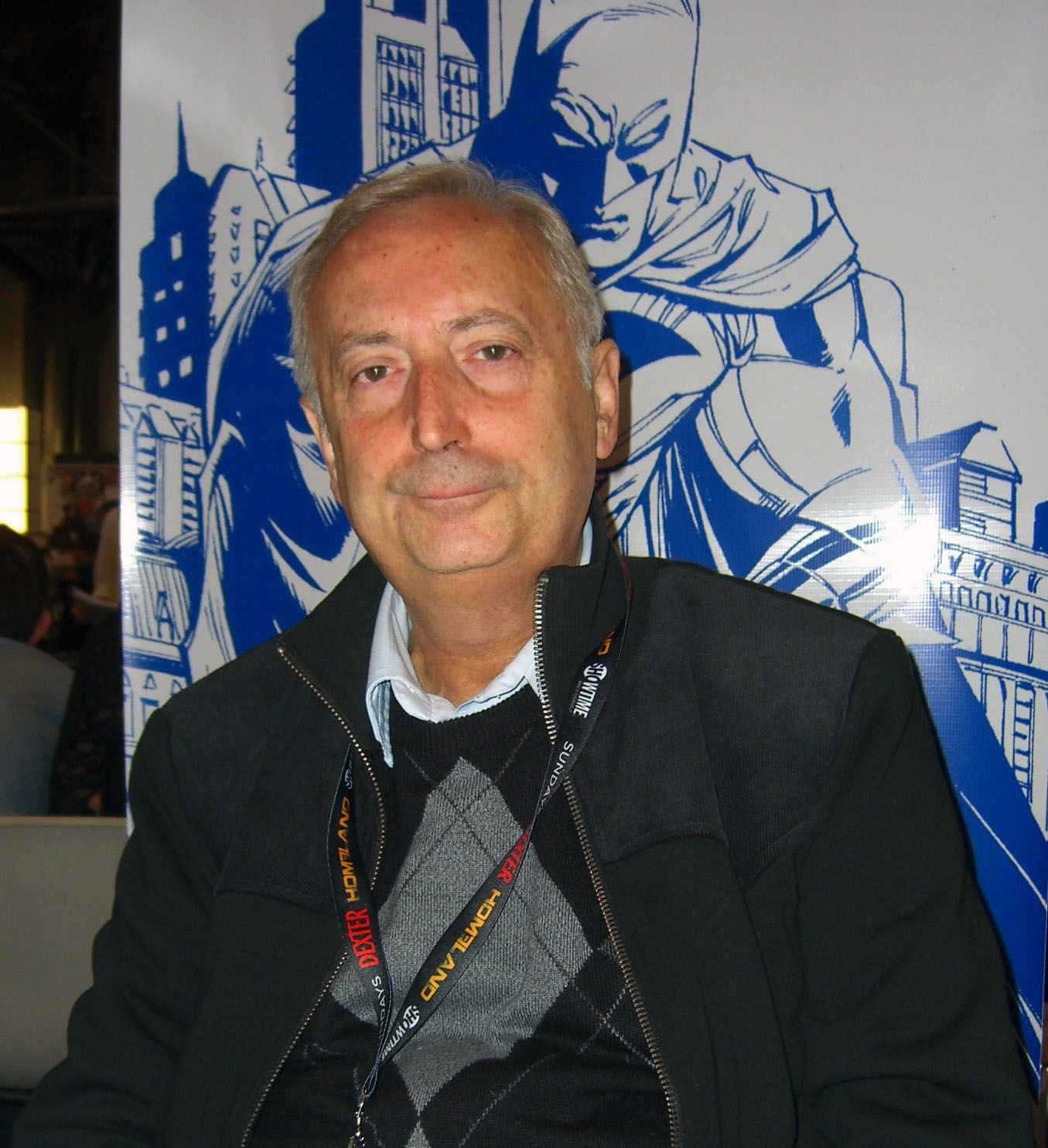
- Florea at the 2011 New York Comic Con.
- Born: 28 June 1946 (age 80) Ghelari, Romania
- Areas: inker, writer
- Notable works: Batman R.I.P., Batman: Battle for the Cowl, Buffy the Vampire Slayer, The Executioner, X-Men: The End
- Awards: Eurocon (1980)

Sandu Florea (Romanian pronunciation: [ˈsandu ˈflore̯a]; born 28 June 1946) is a Romanian-American comic book and comic strip creator, also known as an inker and book illustrator. A trained architect and a presence on the science fiction scene during the 1970s, he became a professional in the comics genre with albums such as Galbar, and was allegedly the only artist to have obtained a steady income in this way during the communist period. A prolific contributor to Romanian children's magazines, Florea had his activity curbed by communist censorship when he first publicized his intention of emigrating to the United States. He eventually left the country shortly after the 1989 Revolution, and soon after began collaborating with Marvel, DC Comics and other leading enterprises in the field of comic book publishing. He became especially noted for his activities as an inker, with contributions on series such as Buffy the Vampire Slayer, The Executioner, X-Men: The End, Batman R.I.P. and Batman: Battle for the Cowl.

Florea has maintained enduring contacts with his native country, and has taken an initiative in popularizing the American comic book style in Romania. He has been described as one of the most successful among his colleagues, and claimed to be one of the most recognizable Romanians in his field.

== Biography ==
=== Early life and career in Romania ===
Scene from Galbar (1973)

Born in Ghelari, Hunedoara County, Sandu Florea first became interested in comics while in fifth grade, his first contact with the medium being through a copy of the French youth magazine Pif Vaillant. This encounter, he recalled in a 2004 interview, left him with "an impression that cannot be erased", and "the wish that I myself could draw such appealing and interesting characters."

Sandu Florea published his first comic strip in 1968, with Luminiţa children's magazine. It was a series centered on the anecdotal hero classic Păcală. In 1971, Florea graduated from Bucharest's Architectural College, and subsequently worked for a building design institute in his adoptive city of Timișoara. Before graduation, he had also published his first work in the comics genre, inspired by the folkloric tale of Păcală, and featured in a 1968 issue of Luminiţa magazine.

After moving to Timișoara, he became a noted presence among the local science fiction fan base, joining the H. G. Wells Literary Club founded by writer Ovidiu Şurianu. Their collaboration produced the 1973 Galbar, reportedly the first Romanian science fiction comic book. In 1975, he and Timișoara native Marcel Luca published what is thought to be the first-ever Romanian coloring book with a science fiction subject, Vreau să fiu cosmonaut ("I Want to be a Cosmonaut"), which reputedly sold 45,000 copies. By then, having received offers of collaboration from two publishing houses (Editura Ion Creangă and Editura Facla), Florea settled back in Bucharest and focused exclusively on his work in comics and illustration. Said to have been the most prolific comic book author active during the communist period, he had his work featured in almost all of the children's periodicals in print at the time.

During the late 1970s and early 1980s, he was creating and publishing comic books dedicated to popular legends, such as a retake on Ion Creangă's fantasy story Harap Alb, or recounting episodes in Romanian history (involving Dacian rulers Burebista and Decebalus, Roman Emperor Trajan, and Wallachian Prince Michael the Brave). Several single-issue albums in this category were based on texts by historical fiction author Radu Theodoru, forming part of the series Strămoşii ("The Ancestors"). The full list includes: Cavalerul alb ("The White Knight"; Editura Facla, 1976), Călugăreni (referencing the Battle of Călugăreni; Editura Ion Creangă, 1977), Misiune de sacrificiu ("Suicidal Mission"; Editura Ion Creangă, 1979), În lumea lui Harap Alb ("Inside Harap Alb's World"; Editura Sport-Turism, 1979), Burebista, regele dacilor ("Burebista, King of the Dacians"; Editura Sport-Turism, 1980), Decebal şi Traian ("Decebalus and Trajan"; Editura Sport-Turism, 1981), Carusel ("Carousel"; Editura Sport-Turism, 1982), Sarmizegetusa eroică ("Heroic Sarmizegetusa"; Editura Sport-Turism, 1983). Florea was also involved in creating Romania's own Western comics, adapted from stories by Nicolae Frînculescu.

These works received critical attention, both in Romania and abroad. În lumea lui Harap Alb earned him the a Eurocon award (1980). This, literary critic Michael Hăulică notes, made Florea one in a final wave of Romanian Eurocon laureates to have emerged under communism (also including writers Vladimir Colin, Ion Hobana and Gheorghe Săsărman).

Florea also received attention from celebrated poet Nichita Stănescu, who discovered in Carusel an unclassifiable and imaginative work. The writer argued: "[Florea] introduces mystery where we usually had happy-endings, imagination where there was lyricism and an indecisive epic where there was nothing. The book he calls Carusel [...] is without precedent, in Romania and everywhere else." In 1982, Stănescu began working with him on the album Semne şi desemne ("Signs and Designs"). Florea printed the lithographs to go with the poems, but the project was cut short when Stănescu died (December 1983).

=== In the United States ===
The 1984-1989 interval was described by Florea as "one of the most difficult periods in my life." Having unsuccessfully demanded from communist authorities the right of leaving for the United States, where two of his siblings had already settled, Florea was exposed to political persecution, and the censorship apparatus lifted his right to publish, prompting him to contribute several comic strips under various pseudonyms. He returned to public attention after the 1989 Revolution, when he was briefly editor in chief of the new children's magazine Carusel. With Frînculescu, he also founded another such publication, called Proteus.

Sandu Florea, his wife and two children eventually left for the United States in 1991, moving to New York City and afterward settling in Long Island. Although initially discouraged by the competition among comic book artists, Florea recounts, he decided to contact Marvel recruiters within three months of his arrival, submitting a sample of his take on Conan the Barbarian. According to his own statement, Conan proved compatible with his talents: "[he was] the only Marvel character who did not fly, did not breathe fire and did not use psychic waves to defeat his enemies, being instead armed with a giant sword and axe. Since I had been drawing many historical tales back in the old country, Conan was a character whom I could depict in drawing with relative ease."

He was accepted by Marvel soon after this, specialized as an inker, and began working on several of its main releases, including, alongside Conan, The Amazing Spider-Man and the various spin-offs of Avengers, Blackwulf, Elektra, Mighty Thor, Captain America, Doctor Strange, Fantastic Four and X-Men. He also worked with DC Comics (on Superman Second Series, Batman, Justice Society of America, Nightwing) and Dark Horse Comics, signing additional collaborations with Innovation Publishing, Vivid Comics (on The Executioner) and Chaos! Comics (Lady Death, Undertaker). Among the significant miniseries to which he contributed as an inker are X-Men: The End (2004–2006), Batman R.I.P. (2008), and Batman: Battle for the Cowl (2009). His work with Dark Horse included Buffy the Vampire Slayer and Angel. His artistic production also touched other media: Florea created storyboards and other graphics for the motion picture producers Full Moon, as well as book illustrations for The Princeton Review.

=== 2000s initiatives ===
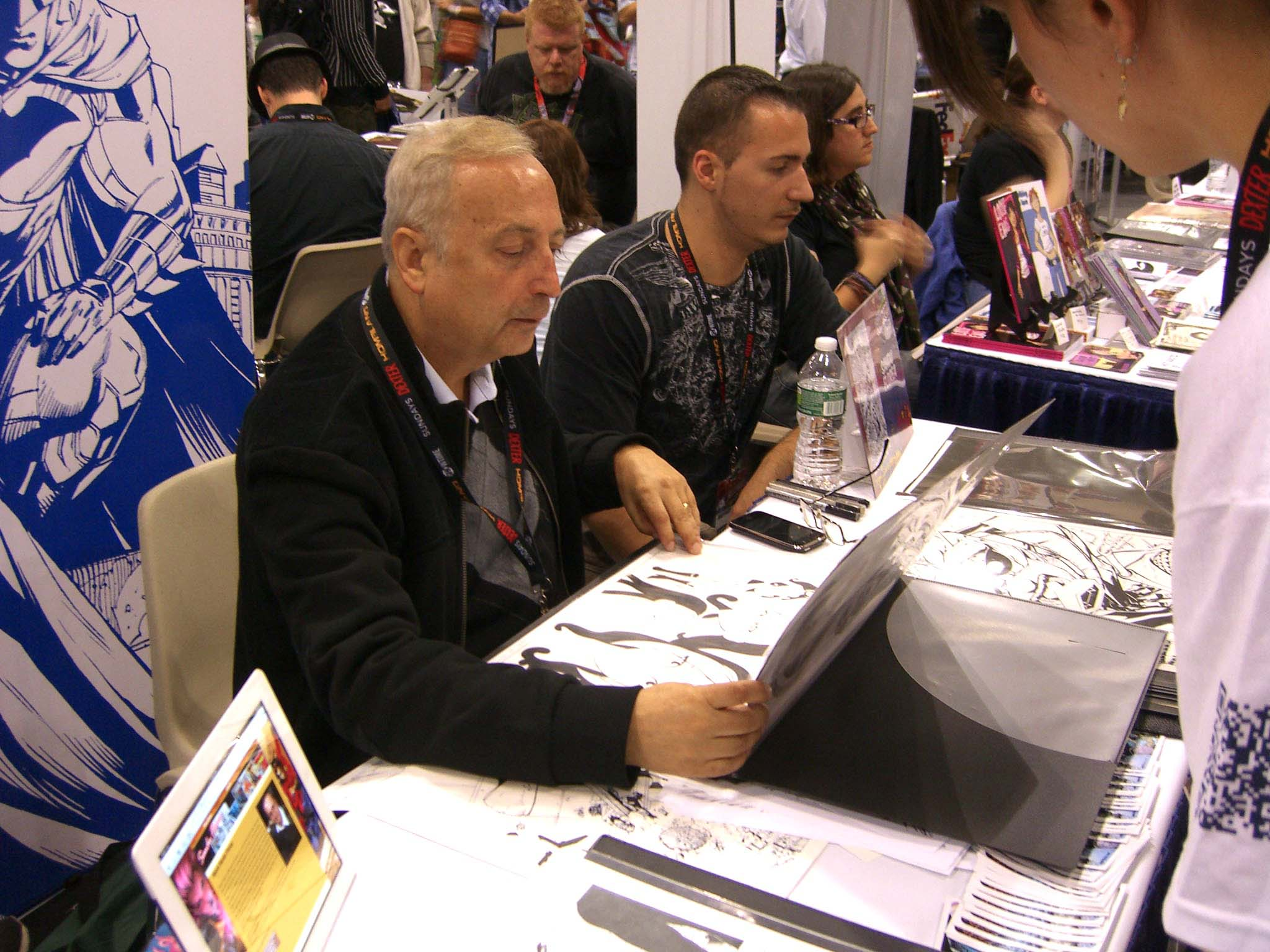
Looking over an aspiring artist's portfolio at the 2011 New York Comic Con.

Florea was selected honorary president of the Romanian Association of Comic Book Fans in 2001. Speaking in 2004, he expressed interest in relaunching the native comic book genre in his native country, and in publishing a new children's periodical with original content. In 2006, he participated in the relaunch of Carusel, in a version argued by Hăulică to have been "professional under any definition."

The publication, which went out of print after only two issues due to distribution problems, included Romanian-language reprints of American comics such as Conan the Barbarian and Aliens, alongside original collaborations between Florea and his Romanian colleagues: Două paloşe ("Two Backswords", with Florea as artist and György Györfi-Deák as writer), Ultima frontieră ("The Final Frontier", text by Florea, Marian Mirescu and Eddie Pandele, drawings by Daniel Rizea and Cătălin Gospodin), Toxic (text by Florea, drawings by Tudor Popa), Leviathan (written by Cristian Lăzărescu, illustrated by Florea). The magazine also featured Borderland, a comic series conceived especially for a Romanian public by writer John Warner and illustrated by Florea, depicting the confrontation between three worlds: of the Mortals, of Magic and of the Demons. Around the same time, Sandu Florea also began contributing to various Romanian webzines, such as Pro-Scris, Imagikon and Paradox—the latter of which published his strip Fortăreaţa, based on a short story by Ovidiu Bufnilă. Several aspects related to the artist's new Romanian ventures were however criticized by Michael Hăulică. He argued that Toxic in particular was "weak and obvious", and noted that, in its featured edition, the text of Borderland evidenced its translator's poor command of the Romanian language.

These initiatives helped cement the artist's reputation in Romania. Sandu Florea claims to be "The only Romanian professional graphic artist who has managed to make a living exclusively out of his drawings, in the old country as well as [...] in America." Dodo Niţă, a historiographer of Romanian comics and Florea's colleague at Carusel, placed În lumea lui Harap Alb as fifth among an all-time chart of original Romanian works in the genre. According to a 2008 piece in the Romanian daily Evenimentul Zilei, Florea shares the distinction of "best known Romanian comic book artist" with Mircea Arapu, the latter being known for his contribution in Francophone comics.

An annual Romanian comic book fan convention in Constanţa awards the Sandu Florea Prize to artists with a long contribution in their field. In 2010, Florea was guest of honor at the European Comic Strip Salon, organized by the Romanian Cultural Institute (ICR) at the National Theatre Bucharest. He exhibited his work, including the never before seen Semne şi desemne collection, at the Bucharest "Comic Book Museum" exhibit, jointly organized by the ICR and the Belgian Comic Strip Center in 2011.
