= Broadsword (disambiguation) =

A broadsword, or basket-hilted sword, is an early modern European sword.

Broadsword may also refer to:

- A type of medieval arming sword with a broad blade, designed more for cutting than thrusting
- Chinese broadsword, a single-edged Chinese sword
- Scottish broadsword, a Scottish basket-hilted sword

== Entertainment ==
- BroadSword Comics, an American comic book publisher
- Traveller Adventure 7: Broadsword, a 1982 role-playing game adventure for Traveller
- "Broadsword", a song by Jethro Tull from their 1982 album The Broadsword and the Beast
- Broadsword Interactive Limited, a British video game developer; see Category:Broadsword Interactive games
- Broadsword Online Games, an American video game developer succeeding Mythic Entertainment

== Ships ==
- Broadsword-class frigate, also known as the Type 22 frigate
- HMS Broadsword, a list of ships named HMS Broadsword

== Other uses ==
- Joyce Broadsword (born 1958), American politician

== See also ==
- Classification of swords § Broadsword
- SS Empire Broadsword, a 1943 Empire ship
