= Paul Lee (artist) =

British artist based in New York City

Paul Lee (born 16 June 1974) is a British artist based in New York City, United States.

== Background ==
Paul Lee was born and grew up in Ilford, London, England.

He studied at St Martins School of Art and then Winchester School of Art, where he received his BA (Hons) in Fine Art in 1997.

Lee was Artist in Residence at the Chinati Foundation in Marfa, Texas, in 2007.

He works in painting, sculpture and collage, using materials such as light-bulbs, cans, rocks and towels.

== Selected exhibitions ==
2019

I See With My Body Now, Karma, New York, NY, USA

2018

David Shelton Gallery, Houston, TX, USA

On My Way To You Now, Modern Art, London

2017

Pestle, Michael Lett, Auckland, New Zealand

2016

Centre, Jeffrey Stark, New York, NY, USA

Layers for a Brain Corner, Maccarone, Los Angeles, CA, USA

2015

On The Beach In The Dark, Untilthen, Paris, France

Nocturnal, seeing in the dark, a path of light that does not cross others, Modern Art, London

Rosenwald-Wolf Gallery, University of the Arts, Philadelphia, PA, USA

2014

Matinee, Maccarone, New York, NY, USA

Modern Art and Maccarone, Independent, New York, NY, USA

39 Great Jones, New York, NY, USA

2013

Active Light, Michael Lett, Auckland, New Zealand

Emerald, Maccarone, New York, NY, USA

2011

Moon River, Modern Art, London

2010

Stuart Shave/Modern Art, London, UK

Lavender, Maccarone, New York, USA

2009

Abstract America: New Painting and Sculpture, Saatchi Gallery, London, UK

2008

Peres Projects, Los Angeles, CA, USA

2007

Paul Lee Chinati Foundation, Marfa, TX, USA

Peres Projects, Berlin, Germany

NeoIntegrity, curated by Keith Mayerson, Derek Eller Gallery, New York, NY, USA

Substance & Surface, Bortolami, New York, NY

Chinati Foundation, Marfa, Texas

2006

Open Network, Ampersand International, San Francisco, CA

Reservoir, Massimo Audiello, New York, NY

This is Not Called Gay Art Now, curated by Jack Pierson, Paul Kasmin, New York, USA

== Selected Collections ==
The Chinati Foundation, Marfa, TX, USA

Dallas Museum of Art, Dallas, TX, USA

M+, Hong Kong, China

The Morgan Library & Museum, New York, NY, USA

RISD Museum, Rhode Island School of Design, Providence, RI, USA

Rubell Family Collection, Miami, FL, USA

San Antonio Museum of Art, San Antonio, TX, USA

Walker Art Center, Minneapolis, MN, USA

Zabludowicz Collection, London
