= HMS Broadsword =

HMS Broadsword may refer to the following ships of the Royal Navy:

== Ships ==
- HMS Broadsword (D31), was a Weapon-class destroyer launched in 1946 and broken up in 1968.
- HMS Broadsword (F88), was a Type 22 frigate launched in 1975. She was sold to the Brazilian Navy in 1995 and renamed Greenhalgh. She was sunk as target in 2024.

=== Battle honours ===
Ships named Broadsword have been awarded the following battle honours:

- Falkland Islands, 1982

== In fiction ==
- HMS Broadsword, a fictional Royal Navy destroyer in Jeffrey Archer's novel First Among Equals.

== See also ==
- Broadsword-class frigate, another name for the Type 22 frigate.
- SS Empire Broadsword, a 1943 Empire ship.
