= Buffy the Vampire Slayer Season Nine =

Comic book series

- Promotional artwork for Season 9 featuring both core series, Buffy and Angel & Faith. Art by Jo Chen.

Publication information
- Publisher: Dark Horse Comics
- Schedule: Monthly
- Format: Limited series
- Genre: Horror
- Publication date: August 2011 – September 2013
- No. of issues: 25 (core series); 5 (each miniseries)
- Main character: Scooby Gang

Creative team
- Created by: Joss Whedon
- Written by: Buffy: Joss Whedon; Andrew Chambliss; Scott Allie; Jane Espenson; Drew Z. Greenberg; Angel & Faith: Christos Gage; Spike: A Dark Place: Victor Gischler; Willow: Wonderland: Jeff Parker; Christos Gage
- Penciller(s): Buffy: Georges Jeanty; Karl Moline; Cliff Richards; Ben Dewey; Angel & Faith: Rebekah Isaacs; Phil Noto; Chris Samnee; Lee Garbett; Spike: A Dark Place: Paul Lee; Willow: Wonderland: Brian Ching

Collected editions
- Freefall: ISBN 978-1-59582-922-1
- On Your Own: ISBN 978-1-59582-990-0
- Guarded: ISBN 978-1-61655-099-8
- Welcome to the Team: ISBN 978-1-61655-166-7
- The Core: ISBN 978-1-61655-254-1
- Live Through This: ISBN 978-1-59582-887-3
- Daddy Issues: ISBN 978-1-59582-960-3
- Family Reunion: ISBN 978-1-61655-079-0
- Death and Consequences: ISBN 978-1-61655-165-0
- What You Want, Not What You Need: ISBN 978-1-61655-253-4
- Spike: A Dark Place: ISBN 978-1-61655-109-4
- Willow: Wonderland: ISBN 978-1-61655-145-2

Buffy the Vampire Slayer Season Nine is a comic book series published by Dark Horse Comics from 2011 to 2013. It is the sequel to the Season Eight comic book series, a canonical continuation of the television series Buffy the Vampire Slayer. The Season Nine brand also incorporates a new Buffy spin-off series, Angel & Faith, and two spin-off miniseries Willow: Wonderland and Spike: A Dark Place.

The core series consists of 25 issues and each miniseries consists of 5 issues. While Joss Whedon, the creator of the original television series, shares writing duties with Andrew Chambliss on the main series, Christos Gage writes Angel & Faith.

The beginning of Season Nine focuses on Buffy living in San Francisco in a world without magic. Angel & Faith, on the other hand, is set primarily in London and pursues several plot threads from Season Eight. The series were followed in 2014 by the start of a Season Ten line of Buffy and Angel & Faith comics.

== Plot ==
=== Buffy ===
Buffy the Vampire Slayer Season Nine continues the plot thread from the previous series, focusing on Buffy and her core group of friends. After the Twilight crisis, in which she destroyed the 'Seed of Wonder' and consequently brought about the end of magic, Buffy is now living in San Francisco and must continue her duties as the Slayer. However, there is a new status quo in Buffy's personal life as well as in her Slayer career. For example, in the process of becoming a vampire, demons are no longer able to fully possess the dead, creating mindless creatures which Xander coins "zompires". Xander and Buffy's sister Dawn have settled into a quiet domestic life together, and Buffy's best friend Willow no longer possesses magical abilities. Andrew and Riley are still friends of Buffy's, but she sees them less frequently. Buffy lives with two seemingly normal roommates, Tumble and Anaheed, and the job of patrolling for vampires initially falls to Buffy and her ex-lover Spike, a vampire with a soul.

Due to his feelings for Buffy, Spike departs San Francisco in his space ship. Willow also leaves, Buffy's broken scythe in tow, on a quest to restore magic. Buffy faces a few enemies, including many ravenous zompires, the rogue Slayer Simone Doffler, and a young man named Severin—prophesied as "the Siphon"— who since the end of magic possesses the ability to drain demons and Slayers of their magic. Buffy works primarily with a few new allies, including Robert Dowling, an SFPD officer who heads up an anti-zompire task force, and Billy Lane, a gay teenager who moved to San Francisco to support Buffy's cause. Later it is revealed that Anaheed is another Slayer who has been tasked with looking out for Buffy, and she takes Billy under her wing. Buffy is also briefly allied with Eldre Koh, an ancient demon whose mystical prison was broken along with the end of magic, and for this swears a debt of loyalty to Buffy. Koh reveals however, that his vendetta against his ancient jailer trumps his loyalty to Buffy, and betrays her trust. Later, on a mission with Dowling and Billy, Buffy finds herself transported to Los Angeles where she is approached by another ancient demon, Illyria (a character from the television series Angel), who recruits Buffy to a team dedicated to defeating Severin. Eldre Koh and Buffy's old enemy D'Hoffryn are also members of Illyria's council. Buffy, Illyria and Koh strategize to disarm and take out Severin. However, their plan fails and Severin is successful in draining Illyria of her abilities leaving her alive but powerless and stuck in the physical appearance of her human host body, Winifred Burkle. Having drained Illyria of her powers, Severin acquires her ability to freely travel through time, which he needs to resurrect his dead girlfriend.

Soon after, Buffy discovers that Dawn (who was created from a mystical key in Buffy season five) is dying as a result of the end of magic. Xander—who has been struggling with his anger since Giles' death in Season Eight—blames Buffy for Dawn's predicament. Severin and Simone approach and ask him to steal Buffy's sole inheritance from Giles (the Vampyr book seen in Buffy episode one) so that they might use it to go back in time and avert the Twilight crisis which precipitated the end of magic. Willow returns from her journey with her powers and Buffy's scythe restored, but she can only buy time for Dawn, whose health is still failing. Xander appears to confess to Buffy of Severin's plan, leading the trio head to the Deeper Well in the English Cotswolds (a prison for ancient demons seen in Angel) where they hope they can acquire sufficient magical reserves for Willow to restore Dawn. Spike returns to San Francisco to provide comfort to Dawn; he watches over her as she fades rapidly from existence. As Buffy's team enters the Well, at the opposite end of the Earth so too do Simone and Severin, acting on information supplied by Xander. Buffy learns of Xander's deceit and is furious with him. Inside, Severin and Willow both charge with abundant magical energies, but it is too much for Severin to handle and he will soon explode with power. Willow's magic forms a new Seed, which will take a millennium to reach full power. However, with assistance from Illyria, she persuades Severin to transfer his power to the new Seed, thereby causing it to mature and restore magic to the world. Illyria chooses to stay with Severin to ensure the task is completed. Meanwhile, Simone awakens Maloker, the Old One responsible for siring the first vampire, and allows herself to be sired, endowing her with fantastic super strength while allowing her to retain her intelligence. As Xander attempts to help Koh and the Council subdue Maloker, Simone gets the upper hand against Buffy, but sensing her need to escape the Well, she leaves Buffy to be finished off by Maloker, who has killed all the Council save for D'Hoffryn and Koh. As her friends evacuate the Well, Buffy expresses regret for making someone like Simone into a Slayer, and dusts her with the scythe. Further below, Severin explodes with power, restoring magic to the world. The resulting explosion seemingly kills him, along with Maloker and Illyria. Buffy narrowly escapes the Well.

In the immediate aftermath of their battle, Willow returns the gang to San Francisco and uses Buffy's blood and her magic to restore Dawn. Xander expresses guilt about his betrayal, but Buffy forgives him as his actions ultimately led to the creation of a new Seed, which saved Dawn. Willow warns Buffy something feels different in the world. Willow and Buffy turn to the Vampyr book to research possible consequences of their actions and find its pages are now blank. Elsewhere, a newly sired vampire is shown to retain her intelligence, stand in sunlight and even shapeshift into a bat.

=== Angel & Faith ===
In Angel & Faith, the title characters reside in the former London home of Rupert Giles, Buffy's former mentor, which passed to the Slayer Faith in his will following his death in the Season Eight finale. Faith seeks to rehabilitate Angel after his actions as Twilight in Season Eight, while he is on the hunt for the scattered pieces of Giles' soul in order to resurrect him. Former allies from his tenure as Twilight—including Whistler, and the half-demons Pearl and Nash—are out for revenge from Angel for aborting their original plans, as is a British contingent of Slayers led by the Slayer Nadira who cannot forgive Angel for the many atrocities he has caused both as Twilight and earlier in his career. Whistler plans to use the residual magic contained in scattered artifacts around the world to unleash a plague which will mutate humankind into a magical species, creating a new world order, at the cost of many human lives. Angel and Faith go on several missions and acquire numerous fragments of Giles' soul using the mystical Tooth of Ammuk, and Angel's personality becomes increasingly influenced by the growing presence of Giles' soul within him. Angel and Faith are joined and supported by Giles' great aunts, Lavinia and Sophronia Fairweather, two depowered witches who used their magic to remain young and beautiful, and by Alasdair Coames, a depowered "archmage" and a collector of magical artifacts who is an old friend of Giles's.

Willow visits Angel and Faith's apartment on her mission to restore magic, and as the Scythe contains a piece of Giles' soul, is able to enlist their help. Taking the gang to Los Angeles, they reconvene with Angel's friend Gunn and his son Connor (from the Angel series). Connor was raised in the hell dimension Quor'toth, and through him Willow is able to transport them there using residual magic in the Scythe. Once there, she regains her powers and begins an inter-dimensional journey, and Angel receives the penultimate piece of Giles's soul. Later, Angel and Faith recover a mystical item which is key to restoring Giles's corpse to full health so they can reanimate it. However, they discover he is not buried in his grave. They learn that Giles's body has been possessed by the demon Eyghon (from the Buffy episode "The Dark Age"), to whom he sold his soul in his youth. Angel reveals that he has known of Eyghon's survival, as well as his partnership with Whistler, Pearl and Nash. Because vampires are immune to Eyghon's ability to possess the dead and unconscious, with which he plans to build an army of Slayers, Angel recruits Spike to assist him on a mission to kill the demon. The trio, supported by a band of Slayers, manages to slay Eyghon using an enchanted sword. Traumatized by this battle and by recent losses, the Slayers who worked alongside Nadira quit to lead normal lives. With Eyghon's death, Giles's complete soul is restored, and is later transferred from Angel's body to a mystical vessel. Spike quickly departs after learning Buffy called Faith requesting help for Dawn, but Angel and Faith have no idea who Dawn is supposed to be. The remaining group then go ahead with the plan to bring Giles back to life, using Coames's collection of artifacts to provide the required magic for the spell. The ritual is interfered with when Whistler, Pearl and Nash arrive to steal Coames' magical artifacts. The trio make off with everything after a brief and brutal skirmish.

The group is astounded when Giles is successfully returned to life, but as a 12-year-old boy with his memories intact, due to his aunts focusing on their memories of him as a child. Giles thanks them for saving him from Eyghon but is furious at the age of his body and that they have been wasting time trying to bring him back and not saving the world from Whistler's plan. The group form a battle plan including a way to shield themselves from the plague, and accept that they all might die. The group, trailed by Nadira, confront Whistler, Pearl and Nash on a rooftop in Hackney as they prepare to unleash their magical plague by releasing an orb of pure magic into the upper atmosphere. Angel and Faith are easily outgunned, and Nadira is gravely wounded by Nash. Giles is able to use ambient magic to attack Nash with a fireball, causing him drop the magical orb, albeit from a sufficient height to mutate local residents into all manner of magical creatures. Though burnt within an inch of her life, Nadira is able to help Faith kill Nash. Upon Nash's death, his power is absorbed by Pearl, who escapes the scene in tears at the loss of her brother. Angel takes on Whistler head-to-head; he damages the orb, forcing Whistler to absorb some of its magic, which clears his unbalanced mind. Whistler realizes the error of his ways, destroys the orb himself, and dies. In the season's dénouement, Pearl's hand is shown emerging ominously from a river. Even though it is medically impossible, Nadira is still alive, but is somehow mutating. Coames worries that with Whistler's death the universe will no longer have someone working towards balance; Angel says that people will have to do it for themselves. Lavinia and Sophronia take credit in front of the media for stopping the crisis. Faith and Giles decide to return to America, Faith thinking she may work with Kennedy's Slayer bodyguard corporation and Giles aiming to reunite with Buffy. Angel parts on good terms with them, deciding to stay behind in London's newly christened "Magic Town" suburb where he expects many conflicts are yet to arise. He dedicates himself once again to helping the helpless.

=== Miniseries ===
Willow: Wonderland follows on from Willow's crossover appearance in Angel & Faith. On her travels, Willow befriends a cursed warlock known as Marrak. In a magical dimension resembling "Wonderland", Willow is reunited with her former tutor and lover Aluwyn, the Saga Vasuki, whom she could not commune with after the end of magic. Aluwyn and her "supercoven" of witches restore Buffy's broken magical Scythe but inform Willow that opening a functional portal to her home world will be impossible because it does not have magic of its own. At first Willow enjoys the freedom of limitless power in a magical community, but later realizes Aluwyn has secluded her to the neglect of her friends, and the pair separate. The experience leaves Willow with a newfound understanding of her abilities and her own nature, including the oneness of her "Dark Willow" persona and her normal self. While traveling with Marrak again, his obsession with dark magic becomes apparent, and she realizes that he is in fact Rack, the dealer responsible for her earlier black magic addiction, whom she believed she had killed. In the story's final part, Willow and Rack battle until he is defeated, and she in turn is guided by a sentient universe back to Earth—this time, with her own magic restored and the message that it is for all the world to share. She walks the streets of San Francisco at peace.

Spike: A Dark Place continues from Spike's departure in Buffy, and precedes his appearance in Angel & Faith. Demons seize control of Spike's ship seeking to return to the ruins of Sunnydale, California, over the mystical Hellmouth where Buffy shattered the Seed of Wonder, bringing about the end of magic. They hope to acquire the shattered fragments of the seed, for they contain residual magic. At the site of Buffy's battle, Spike encounters a succubus named Morgan who helps him kill his captors and explains that she, like many demons, is after these fragments as well; she plans to use them to open the dormant Hellmouth on Easter Island. Morgan's powers place Spike under her thrall and using his ship, he transports her to the site of the Hellmouth before coming to his senses. Once there, Morgan's spell to open the Hellmouth fails, and instead brings the moai to life. The moai later fuse into a stone giant which attacks Spike and Morgan. During the fray, the giant strikes and destroys Spike's space ship, leading all but one of Spike's insectoid crew to evacuate. A sole bug goes down with the ship, which takes the giant out with him. Morgan departs after Spike soundly rejects the chance of being in a relationship with her. The remaining bugs decide to set up home in the caves of Easter Island, and part ways with Spike. Contemplating a return to San Francisco, Spike receives a phone call from Angel requesting his help.

Love vs Life is a three-part story written by Jane Espenson, originally serialized in Dark Horse Presents, following Billy's and Anaheed's departure from San Francisco during Buffy's last arc. Billy is summoned back to his hometown of Santa Rosita by his boyfriend Devon after it is overrun by zompires who do not need an invitation to enter people's homes. Anaheed travels along with him and says they can only evacuate the town; she advises him that a Slayer ought to know when to cut their losses. Billy remembers Buffy telling him a Slayer must put the world first, above even those they love. He breaks up with Devon despite Devon saying Buffy is wrong. When zompires attack Devon and his father in their basement, Anaheed holds Billy back, believing they cannot reach them in time. However, Billy has a vision of the First Slayer battling vampires with fire. Billy uses fire to scare off the zompires and save Devon and his father. Billy and Devon decide to stay together. When Devon expresses disbelief Billy could have made a connection to Slayer mythology, Anaheed says maybe something out there chose to hook into Billy.

== Production ==
=== Conception ===
Whedon and Dark Horse began preparing for Season Nine before the conclusion of Season Eight, and production for the series started shortly after Season Eight ended. Whedon decided to use the finale to Season Eight to establish a new paradigm for Season Nine. While Whedon had chosen to fully exploit the possibilities of a comic book medium to explore more fantastical storylines, he later reflected that Buffy was less about the scope of its storytelling and more about the emotional experience of its characters. The "end of magic" at the conclusion of Season Eight would therefore do many things: it would make Buffy an underdog once again, restore her setting to the "real world", and make its stories more personal. He also chose to kill off Rupert Giles because that character's television functions—providing narrative exposition, and acting as a paternal figure—did not translate well to the comic book format. Both the end of magic and Giles' death provide significant plot generators for the stories which followed.

In 2010, Dark Horse confirmed that it had reacquired the license to Angel comics, which would move from IDW Publishing. Titles revolving around Angel and his supporting cast from the Angel television series would then appear as part of the Season Nine banner of Buffy comics. Editor Scott Allie confirmed his intent for characters from the Buffy and Angel television series to interact more freely with one another, giving the series "an early Marvel Universe feel." In 2011, Dark Horse had confirmed plans for its "Season Nine" brand to consist of two main titles, both of 25 issues over the course of two years. Subsequent announcements followed that Dark Horse's Angel series would also focus on Faith Lehane and be titled Angel & Faith, set in London, and exclusively written by Christos Gage. Whedon himself would write the first issue of Buffy before passing the responsibility over to Andrew Chambliss, with whom he would also co-write the second issue.

Due to Whedon's duties directing The Avengers, a big-budget superhero film due for release in 2012, he organised a writer's summit at his house with Chambliss, Gage, Jane Espenson, Drew Greenberg, his brother Zack Whedon and others. This was to allow the series' writers to "lock down" the storylines for Buffy Season Nine and Angel & Faith before Whedon became less available. Whedon outlined that because Season Eight had drawn criticism for becoming too fantastical and "cosmic", Season Nine was to be more character-driven, and as much like the television series as possible. Due to its differing premise, Angel & Faith was not modeled directly on the Angel series, though it nevertheless revolved around its characters following episodic "cases". The series benefited greatly from plans for other unproduced Buffy television spin-offs, particularly Ripper, a series intended as a vehicle for Anthony Stewart Head portraying Rupert Giles, with flashbacks to his wayward youth. Whedon offered Gage the use of two characters created for that series, Giles' aunts Sophronia and Lavinia Fairweather—two ageless witches who in the television series would have been portrayed by Anthony Head's daughters, actresses Emily and Daisy Head. Many of the revelations about Giles' past were drawn from Ripper scripts and production notes.

=== History ===
The first story published under the Season Nine banner was a mini-story by Jane Espenson featuring Spike, titled Buffy the Vampire Slayer Season 9: Magical Mystery Tour Featuring the Beetles, written by Jane Espenson. It was released as part of Dark Horse's Digital Retailer Exclusive program. Free Comic Book Day in April 2012, Chambliss' released the mini-story "In Space No One Can Hear You Slay," depicting Buffy and Spike on a "spacecation" following her pregnancy scare in "Apart (of Me)". In the story, a member of Spike's insectoid alien crew is sired and becomes a zompire, creating a creature which closely resembles the titular aliens of the Alien movie franchise. Some news outlets reported the story as an Alien crossover story. Over three issues, Dark Horse Presents presented "Love vs. Life," a three-part story by Jane Espenson and Karl Moline featuring new characters Billy Lane and Anaheed.

In April 2012, Dark Horse also announced Spike and Willow miniseries spinning off from the Buffy title. A miniseries focusing on Drusilla after the events of Angel & Faith #9 was also planned, but was later delayed indefinitely due to scheduling issues.

== Publication ==
=== Core series ===
==== Buffy the Vampire Slayer Season Nine ====
===== Single issues =====
Title	Issue #	Release date
"Freefall, Part I"	1	September 14, 2011
Writer: Joss Whedon | Penciller: Georges Jeanty
"Freefall, Part II"	2	October 12, 2011
Writer: Joss Whedon and Andrew Chambliss		Penciller: Georges Jeanty
"Freefall, Part III"	3	November 9, 2011
Writer: Andrew Chambliss		Penciller: Georges Jeanty
"Freefall, Part IV"	4	December 14, 2011
Writer: Andrew Chambliss		Penciller: Georges Jeanty
"Slayer, Interrupted"	5	January 11, 2012
Writer: Andrew Chambliss		Penciller: Karl Moline
"On Your Own, Part I"	6	February 8, 2012
Writer: Andrew Chambliss		Penciller: Georges Jeanty
"On Your Own, Part II"	7	March 14, 2012
Writer: Andrew Chambliss		Penciller: Georges Jeanty
"Apart (of Me), Part I"	8	April 11, 2012
Writer: Andrew Chambliss		Penciller: Cliff Richards
"Apart (of Me), Part II"	9	May 9, 2012
Writer: Andrew Chambliss and Scott Allie		Penciller: Cliff Richards
"Apart (of Me), Part III"	10	June 13, 2012
Writer: Andrew Chambliss and Scott Allie		Penciller: Cliff Richards
"Guarded, Part I"	11	July 11, 2012
Writer: Andrew Chambliss		Penciller: Georges Jeanty
"Guarded, Part II"	12	August 8, 2012
Writer: Andrew Chambliss		Penciller: Georges Jeanty
"Guarded, Part III"	13	September 12, 2012
Writer: Andrew Chambliss		Penciller: Georges Jeanty
"Billy the Vampire Slayer, Part I"	14	October 10, 2012
Writer: Jane Espenson		Penciller: Karl Moline
"Billy the Vampire Slayer, Part II"	15	November 14, 2012
Writer: Drew Z. Greenberg		Penciller: Karl Moline, Ben Dewey
"Welcome to the Team, Part I"	16	December 12, 2012
Writer: Andrew Chambliss		Penciller: Georges Jeanty
"Welcome to the Team, Part II"	17	January 9, 2013
Writer: Andrew Chambliss		Penciller: Georges Jeanty
"Welcome to the Team, Part III"	18	February 13, 2013
Writer: Andrew Chambliss		Penciller: Georges Jeanty
"Welcome to the Team, Part IV"	19	March 13, 2013
Writer: Andrew Chambliss		Penciller: Georges Jeanty
"The Watcher"	20	April 10, 2013
Writer: Andrew Chambliss		Penciller: Karl Moline
"The Core, Part I"	21	May 8, 2013
Writer: Andrew Chambliss		Penciller: Georges Jeanty
"The Core, Part II"	22	June 12, 2013
Writer: Andrew Chambliss		Penciller: Georges Jeanty
"The Core, Part III"	23	July 10, 2013
Writer: Andrew Chambliss		Penciller: Georges Jeanty
.
"The Core, Part IV"	24	August 14, 2013
Writer: Andrew Chambliss		Penciller: Georges Jeanty
"The Core, Part V"	25	September 11, 2013
Writer: Andrew Chambliss		Penciller: Georges Jeanty

===== Trade Paperbacks =====
Volume	Title	Issues collected	Release date	ISBN
1	"Freefall"	1–5	July 4, 2012	ISBN 978-1-59582-922-1
2	"On Your Own"	6–10 + "In Space No One Can Hear You Slay!"	December 18, 2012	ISBN 978-1-59582-990-0
3	"Guarded"	11–15	May 14, 2013	ISBN 978-1-61655-099-8
4	"Welcome to the Team"	16–20	October 9, 2013	ISBN 978-1-61655-166-7
5	"The Core"	21–25 + "Love vs. Life"	March 5, 2014	ISBN 978-1-61655-254-1

===== Library Editions =====
Volume	Trade Paperbacks collected	Release date	ISBN
1	Buffy the Vampire Slayer – Season 9, Volume 1: Freefall; Buffy the Vampire Slayer – Season 9, Volume 2: On Your Own	January 14, 2015	ISBN 978-1616557157
2	Buffy the Vampire Slayer – Season 9, Volume 3: Guarded; Willow: Wonderland	July 7, 2015	ISBN 978-1616557164
3	Buffy the Vampire Slayer – Season 9, Volume 4: Welcome to the Team; Buffy the Vampire Slayer – Season 9, Volume 5: The Core	November 24, 2015	ISBN 978-1616557171

==== Angel & Faith ====
===== Single issues =====
Title	Issue #	Release date
"Live Through This, Part I"	1	August 31, 2011
Writer: Christos Gage		Penciller: Rebekah Isaacs
"Live Through This, Part II"	2	September 28, 2011
Writer: Christos Gage		Penciller: Rebekah Isaacs
"Live Through This, Part III"	3	October 26, 2011
Writer: Christos Gage		Penciller: Rebekah Isaacs
"Live Through This, Part IV"	4	November 30, 2011
Writer: Christos Gage		Penciller: Rebekah Isaacs
"In Perfect Harmony"	5	December 28, 2011
Writer: Christos Gage		Penciller: Phil Noto
"Daddy Issues, Part I"	6	January 25, 2012
Writer: Christos Gage		Penciller: Rebekah Isaacs
"Daddy Issues, Part II"	7	February 29, 2012
Writer: Christos Gage		Penciller: Rebekah Isaacs
"Daddy Issues, Part III"	8	March 28, 2012
Writer: Christos Gage		Penciller: Rebekah Isaacs
"Daddy Issues, Part IV"	9	April 25, 2012
Writer: Christos Gage		Penciller: Rebekah Isaacs
"Women of a Certain Age"	10	May 30, 2012
Writer: Christos Gage		Penciller: Chris Samnee
"Family Reunion, Part I"	11	June 27, 2012
Writer: Christos Gage		Penciller: Rebekah Isaacs
"Family Reunion, Part II"	12	July 25, 2012
Writer: Christos Gage		Penciller: Rebekah Isaacs
"Family Reunion, Part III"	13	August 29, 2012
Writer: Christos Gage		Penciller: Rebekah Isaacs
"Family Reunion, Part IV"	14	September 26, 2012
Writer: Christos Gage		Penciller: Rebekah Isaacs
"The Hero of His Own Story"	15	October 31, 2012
Writer: Christos Gage		Penciller: Lee Garbett
"Death and Consequences, Part I"	16	November 28, 2012
Writer: Christos Gage		Penciller: Rebekah Isaacs
"Death and Consequences, Part II"	17	December 19, 2012
Writer: Christos Gage		Penciller: Rebekah Isaacs
"Death and Consequences, Part III"	18	January 30, 2013
Writer: Christos Gage		Penciller: Rebekah Isaacs
"Death and Consequences, Part IV"	19	February 27, 2013
Writer: Christos Gage		Penciller: Rebekah Isaacs
"Spike and Faith"	20	March 27, 2013
Writer: Christos Gage		Penciller: Rebekah Isaacs
"What You Want, Not What You Need, Part I"	21	April 24, 2013
Writer: Christos Gage		Penciller: Rebekah Isaacs
"What You Want, Not What You Need, Part II"	22	May 29, 2013
Writer: Christos Gage		Penciller: Rebekah Isaacs
"What You Want, Not What You Need, Part III"	23	June 26, 2013
Writer: Christos Gage		Penciller: Rebekah Isaacs
"What You Want, Not What You Need, Part IV"	24	July 31, 2013
Writer: Christos Gage		Penciller: Rebekah Isaacs
"What You Want, Not What You Need, Part V"	25	August 28, 2013
Writer: Christos Gage		Penciller: Rebekah Isaacs

===== Trade Paperbacks =====
Volume	Title	Issues collected	Release date	ISBN
1	"Live Through This"	1–5 + Harmony one-shot	June 20, 2012	ISBN 978-1-59582-887-3
2	"Daddy Issues"	6–10	December 4, 2012	ISBN 978-1-59582-960-3
3	"Family Reunion"	11–15	April 30, 2013	ISBN 978-1-61655-079-0
4	"Death and Consequences"	16–20	September 18, 2013	ISBN 978-1-61655-165-0
5	"What You Want, Not What You Need"	21–25	February 19, 2014	ISBN 978-1-61655-253-4

===== Library Editions =====
Volume	Trade Paperbacks collected	Release date	ISBN
1	Angel & Faith – Volume 1: Live Through This; Angel & Faith – Volume 2: Daddy Issues	March 11, 2015	ISBN 978-1616557126
2	Angel & Faith – Volume 3: Family Reunion; Spike: A Dark Place	August 25, 2015	ISBN 978-1616557133
3	Angel & Faith – Volume 4: Death and Consequences; Angel & Faith – Volume 5: What You Want, Not What You Need	January 26, 2016	ISBN 978-1616557140

=== Miniseries ===
==== Spike: A Dark Place ====
===== Single issues =====
Title	Issue #	Release date
"Spike: A Dark Place #1"	1	August 22, 2012
Writer: Victor Gischler		Penciller: Paul Lee
"Spike: A Dark Place #2"	2	September 19, 2012
Writer: Victor Gischler		Penciller: Paul Lee
"Spike: A Dark Place #3"	3	October 24, 2012
Writer: Victor Gischler		Penciller: Paul Lee
"Spike: A Dark Place #4"	4	November 21, 2012
Writer: Victor Gischler		Penciller: Paul Lee
"Spike: A Dark Place #5"	5	January 23, 2013
Writer: Victor Gischler		Penciller: Paul Lee

===== Trade Paperbacks =====
Volume	Title	Issues collected	Release date	ISBN
1	"Spike: A Dark Place"	1–5	June 5, 2013	ISBN 978-1-61655-109-4

==== Willow: Wonderland ====
===== Single issues =====
Title	Issue #	Release date
"Willow: Wonderland #1"	1	November 7, 2012
Writer: Jeff Parker		Penciller: Brian Ching
"Willow: Wonderland #2"	2	December 5, 2012
Writer: Jeff Parker		Penciller: Brian Ching
"Willow: Wonderland #3"	3	January 2, 2013
Writer: Jeff Parker and Christos Gage		Penciller: Brian Ching
"Willow: Wonderland #4"	4	February 6, 2013
Writer: Jeff Parker and Christos Gage		Penciller: Brian Ching
"Willow: Wonderland #5"	5	March 6, 2013
Writer: Jeff Parker and Christos Gage		Penciller: Brian Ching

===== Trade Paperbacks =====
Volume	Title	Issues collected	Release date	ISBN
1	"Willow: Wonderland"	1–5	August 21, 2013	ISBN 978-1-61655-145-2

== Reception ==
=== Buffy the Vampire Slayer ===
Reaction to the new series has generally been positive. Comic Book Resources' Kelly Thompson summed, "Joss Whedon has managed the impossible yet again, somehow reinventing and reinvigorating these beloved characters and putting them on entirely new paths and adventures." Entertainment Weekly's Adam Vary gave the first issue of Season Nine a positive review, stating "Watching Buffy act like a normal twentysomething screw-up is adorable, and a refreshing reminder that, even without the weight of the world on her shoulders, our heroine's life can still be a bit of a mess." Vary commented that this sort of storytelling alone would make an interesting contrast to Season Eight, but noted that Whedon had set up several supernatural plot threads as well, adding "I hope that as Season 9 unfolds, Whedon et al. allow the relative simplicity of Buffy's life to reflect more in the storytelling itself. As any Buffy fan knows, the woman is plenty captivating just on her own." Grey Scherl gave the episode a 9.5/10, writing for Inside Pulse. He praised Jeanty's artwork, although added the caveat "That isn't to say it's perfect, and there are times when he feels a bit rusty at it; some characters look off at times, especially Dawn." His main criticism was directed to the appearance of Riley, who was his least favourite character in the television series. "It's a really fun issue, but it's not something that the uninitiated is going to understand. Whedon brings these characters back to the core of what works, and makes waiting a month for the next issue far more irritating than week between episodes ever was."

WhatCulture's Dean Threadgold gave the first issue of Season Nine 3.5/5. Threadgold praised Whedon's trademark humor, and for delivering "a script that is both witty and fun yet, like the best episodes, full of emotional subtext", despite Season Eight's set-up. Threadgold commented that the series' first issue was "very effective, neatly setting up the new status quo and at the same time sowing the seeds for the rest of the series." However, reservations were directed towards the art: "Georges Jeanty, who is usually top notch with his pencils, displays a few too many inconsistencies with the various characters". Threadgold was also skeptical whether Whedon's decision to share writing duties with comics-novice Andrew Chambliss would bode well for the series.

Some critics felt the series had improved on Season Eight's relative failures. Scherl felt Season Eight "was too big, too grand in scale and scope, and while the characters were still the ones we know and love, there was something lost in not letting them be in situations that suit who they are." Threadgold wrote "A big criticism of Season 8 was that it failed to be about anything deeper, yet already Season 9 seems eager to rectify that problem," and Vary was eager for the series not to lose sight of its intimate start, commenting "If the 24-page issue was just about this party... it would have been a fascinating, human-scaled change of pace from the fast-paced phantasmagoria of Season 8."

==== Abortion storyline ====
Buffy the Vampire Slayer, Season 9, Issue #6: On Your Own, Part I. Buffy talks to Spike about her decision.

Media attention was raised by Buffy's apparent pregnancy and decision to get an abortion during issues #5-7. Much critical attention to Buffy's decision was mainly positive, with Comic Book Resources' Kelly Thompson saying "The people in charge of this book -- creators, editors and behind-the-scenes puppet masters (that's you, Joss Whedon) -- deserve huge credit for tackling the sensitive and controversial subject of abortion with unflinching honesty and realism." Joss Whedon himself commented on the reasons and intention of the storyline in an interview with EntertainmentWeekly.com: "It's a very difficult decision for her, but she made a decision that so many people make and it's such a hot button issue with Planned Parenthood under constant threat and attack right now. A woman's right to choose is under attack as much as it's ever been, and that's a terrible and dangerous thing for this country. I don't usually get soap box-y with this, but the thing about Buffy is all she's going through is what women go through, and what nobody making a speech, holding up a placard, or making a movie is willing to say." Subsequent reveal that Buffy had been replaced by a robot and not in fact pregnant was met with mixed reactions, with debate focusing on what this meant for Buffy's decision.

In a review of the top 100 comics of 2012, Comic Book Resources' Kelly Thompson cited the abortion storyline as her rationale for including Season Nine on the list, at number 73, saying: "While some readers were disappointed with the execution of the story and others thought the resolution was weak, for me, just the creative team's confidence and commitment to letting this issue even exist is a testament to getting the comic, and the character, exactly right.... Though the storyline ultimately made her controversial resolution moot, it doesn't take away from the decision to make this book in the first place, and to make it as bold and honest as possible."

=== Angel & Faith ===
IGN website gave the first issue of Angel & Faith an (8 out of 10) score, while ComicBookResources described the series as being "a strong book since it debuted"

Rebekah Isaacs, the artist of the series, said in an interview, "[The fans have] still been really supportive, even when the criticism is negative. It's done in a loving way, like they want to see these characters presented well and they want us to do well in telling these stories."
