= Buffy the Vampire Slayer Season Ten =

Comic book series

- Promotional ultravariant artwork for Season 10 featuring both core series, Buffy and Angel & Faith.

Publication information
- Publisher: Dark Horse Comics
- Schedule: Monthly
- Format: Limited series
- Genre: Horror
- Publication date: March 2014 – August 2016
- No. of issues: 30 (Buffy) 25 (Angel & Faith)
- Main character: Scooby Gang

Creative team
- Created by: Joss Whedon
- Written by: Buffy: Christos Gage; Nicholas Brendon; Angel & Faith: Victor Gischler; Kel McDonald
- Penciller(s): Buffy: Rebekah Isaacs; Karl Moline; Cliff Richards; Richard Corben; Megan Levens; Angel & Faith: Will Conrad; Derlis Santacruz; Cliff Richards

Buffy the Vampire Slayer Season Ten is the sequel to the Season Nine comic book series, a canonical continuation of the television series Buffy the Vampire Slayer. The series is published by Dark Horse Comics and ran from March 2014 to August 2016.

The Season Ten brand continues the two ongoing component series that formed Season Nine: Buffy and Angel & Faith. The creative team of Angel & Faith in Season Nine, writer Christos Gage and penciler Rebekah Isaacs, are the creative team behind Buffy Season Ten. Victor Gischler and Will Conrad took over Angel & Faith in this season. Unlike with Season Nine, there were no spin-off series in addition to the two core series. There was however a short story titled "Where Are They Now", published in Dark Horse Day Sampler 2016.

The series was followed by Season Eleven which began November 23, 2016.

== Production ==
As in the preparation for the previous season, there was a writer's summit in spring 2013, months before Season Nine ended. Along with all the creators from Season Nine, Victor Gischler and Buffy the Vampire Slayer actor Nicholas Brendon joined the team.

== Plot ==
=== Buffy the Vampire Slayer ===
Buffy and her friends must quickly get to grips with the new rules of magic created at the end of Season Nine when they encounter a new breed of vampires which can shapeshift, walk in sunlight, and which is generally harder to kill. Another consequence is that Buffy's sister Dawn, though alive again thanks to the recreation of magic, has had a traumatic time adjusting to life; she feels her mother's death as if the event was recent, and her feelings for her boyfriend Xander have reset as well. Meanwhile, Xander is secretly haunted by apparitions of his dead ex-fiance Anya; he does not know if she is real or a hallucination. However, all is not bleak, as Buffy's old mentor Giles is delivered to her by Faith alive and mentally intact, but in the body of a child, following the events of Angel & Faith in the previous season. The group soon learn that the now-blank Vampyr book given to Buffy back in 1997 can be used to write new rules for magic, and quickly realizing what a danger this book is, the gang forms an alliance with the demon D'Hoffryn and other interested parties to keep the book safe and act as stewards over the new and unstable rules of magic. They consider the needs of various mystical groups willing to make peace with humans including a mutually non-lethal agreement with the majority of the world's vampires, led by Harmony Kendall.

The gang does some growing up. Willow prevents Andrew from making a terrible mistake with the Vampyr book when he attempts to resurrect her long-dead girlfriend Tara, whose death he feels responsible for, and confronts his tendency to act impulsively – sometimes with good motivations – but without regard for other people's consent or feelings. He does however activate a digital recording of the personality of his friend and victim Jonathan Levinson. Some time later, after some soul searching, Andrew realizes he is gay. Meanwhile, Willow, ends her relationship with the demon witch Aluwyn, having grown apart, and Xander and Dawn decide to take things slow. Buffy and Spike confront the fact that they've grown closer to each other, and Buffy realizes she loves Spike, and they become a couple. Buffy stands by Spike when it appears that an evil outside force is controlling him at night, and they soon track this force down: an ancient vampire named Archaeus who is part of the same lineage as Spike and Angel, Archaeus having directly sired the Master. Temporarily getting away from the powerful demon, the group realize they will have to bring Angel in on the development. Buffy is able to put the events of Season Eight, in which Angel was influenced by a higher power into being a villain, behind her, but there is initial awkwardness in the group as they attempt to confront Archaeus. However, working together, Buffy, Angel and Spike are able to wound Archaeus and kill his servants with the Scythe, so Archaeus flees. D'Hoffryn informs Buffy that a portal Archaeus was using, which opens into hell dimensions, is called the Restless Door and is being repaired by an alliance of enemies faced by the gang this season: the Old One, the Soul Glutton; the siren, Mistress; and the flesh demon, the Sculptor, who wish to overrun Earth with demons. Angel leaves to warn his friends in London, giving Spike his blessing and accepting a place as a friend in Buffy's life, but confides in Willow that he believes Spike's self-destructiveness will doom his relationship with Buffy.

When Buffy's father Hank announces he doesn't want Buffy to be a part of his wedding due to her being a Slayer, she finds herself surprisingly hurt by this. On a different mission, a demon triggers Buffy's memories of her attempted rape by a soulless Spike. She explains to Spike that she doesn't blame him for his actions when he didn't have a soul, but that she will always remember them, and that he has to respect that she will always have to deal with them in her own way. Meanwhile, Anya's ghost transpires to be the puppet of an unseen force and completely unaware that she is not Anya; it is exploiting Xander as a weak link in Buffy's circle. Later, demon invasions caused by the Restless Door become a global threat. The Slayer Satsu, who once had a fling with Buffy, attempts to convince Buffy that she needs to work with the military as they are the only ones with the resources to help and since she forgave Angel, the military also deserves another chance. The military needs Buffy and Spike to recruit both types of vampires to help battle the demon invasions. The vampires are represented by Harmony and Vicki who have Buffy and Spike win trials of combat to gain the vampires alliance. The two vampire leaders also point out the insecurities in Buffy's and Spike's relationship. Spike later meets with a woman from his past, Dylan, first seen in the Spike: Into the Light (2014) comic. Dylan thanks Spike for giving her the courage to grow as a person and wants a friendship with both him and Buffy. Meanwhile, Buffy is outraged at Willow's eagerness to work for the military, helping them understand magic. Willow believes this is right and has an attraction to Lake Stevens, a woman who leads the military's supernatural unit. Willow and Buffy acknowledge they are changing but agree to not let this disagreement divide them.

To help battle the invasions Buffy reluctantly agrees to use the Vampyr book to increase the powers of D'Hoffryn's Demon Council with the limit that the powers are for the one in office, not the demon themselves. Giles grows close to the Fae folk who accept him in both mind and body, though his favoritism of them leads to some tension with Buffy. The Sculptor offers to make Andrew a human body for Jonathan's digital personality if Andrew steals the Scythe. Andrew tricks the Sculptor into thinking he complied but he actually told Buffy beforehand and she kills the Sculptor. Realising his new body will disintegrate, Jonathan runs off, furious at Andrew betraying him again. Though Andrew is hurt, he has stopped living out his fantasies and is ready to face the real world with the Scoobies. Xander admits to Ghost Anya he knows she isn't actually Anya and decides to ignore her. The Scoobies find and overwhelm the Siren Mistress and Soul Glutton, to escape, the two destroy the Restless Door; creating an unstable portal that will consume Earth unless Dawn as The Key can close it. Being in a magical dimension gives Dawn great power but she can only close the portal from the demon's side and will be stuck there if she does. To save Earth she agrees and convinces the others this is the right choice and they promise to find another way to bring her home. Xander stays with Dawn, leaving Ghost Anya alone and vengeful on Earth. As the Scoobies leave, Buffy wishes D'Hoffryn's Council could just kill the Soul Glutton and Siren Mistress without their help. Ghost Anya secretly grants this wish. After killing the two, D'Hoffryn tells Ghost Anya she was a copy he made and now that she has activated her vengeance powers she becomes corporeal. D'Hoffryn is now ready to take the Vampyr book to give himself power.

While the Scoobies are desperate to reach Dawn and Xander in the hell dimension Anharra, D'Hoffryn kills all the other members of the Magic Council and takes their expanded abilities. The Scoobies are powerless to stop him from taking the book. Meanwhile, Xander and Dawn make the demons of the dimension more civilised but attract the attention of Wolfram & Hart, which has an office there. They reject an offer from W&H lawyer Lilah Morgan to help them find a route home, as that would allow the Senior Partners to return as well. Lilah instead tracks Xander and Dawn as they make their own way home through the multiverse. After D'Hoffryn effortlessly backfires the military's own missiles on them, the military dismisses Willow for the Scoobies' lack of judgement, which leads Willow and Lake to break up. Jonathan returns, tormenting Andrew in an attempt to break up the Scoobies, after he is offered a living body and a life as a vengeance demon by D'Hoffryn. Jonathan shakes Andrew by showing him what his friends really think of him, allowing Jonathan to become the first male vengeance demon, but Andrew realises these comments were taken out of context, and returns to the Scoobies with high-tech weaponry to help fight D'Hoffryn. Giles is disgusted the Fae and the rest of the magical community have agreed to terms with D'Hoffryn, believing him too powerful to fight. Buffy's increasingly aggressive tactics over the book and finding Xander and Dawn put a strain between her and all the Scoobies leading Spike to want to break up with her. Buffy refuses saying their relationship is worth fighting for even if they both have doubts and Spike agrees. Buffy has an idea to stop D'Hoffryn that requires their allies to do nothing. As the Scoobies come together, Dawn and Xander return just in time to join the battle. D'Hoffryn's alterations to the book are rejected as Buffy's plan was to make the magical community believe he would fail; the book only allows rules that the majority of people believe in and will follow. D'Hoffryn broadcasts his battle with the Scoobies to everyone so they will believe he is unstoppable, bringing the Anya copy and Jonathan with him. The Scoobies are quickly overwhelmed while D'Hoffryn claims this is vengeance for taking Anya from him. However, Anya betrays D'Hoffryn and grants Buffy's wish to remove D'Hoffryn's expanded abilities. After D'Hoffryn fatally burns her, the other vengeance demons reject him, and the Scoobies pursue him back to his homeworld, Arashmahar, and kill him, having given Dawn the ability to open portals. Weeks later, the Scoobies decide to own the responsibility of the book, putting Buffy, Willow and Giles on the newest Magical Council, which also includes Dracula, Riley, and other demons, while Lilah and a new cadre of demonic lobbyists and journalists appeal to the Council members for favours. Buffy is excited and nervous about her new responsibilities, but accepts it as part of life.

Where are They Now? is a brief story released in a free sampler celebrating Dark Horse's 30th anniversary. Harmony, Clem, and a two-person film crew of a vampire and human are filming Harmony's documentary of how the world has changed now that the supernatural is known. She annoys Buffy over three days, calling her a relic that is no longer special since she broke the rules to give all the Slayers power, but also warns her that someone is apparently trying to kill her. Buffy is electrocuted by wires left in water in the laundry room. Harmony interrupts Buffy and Spike's date night, implying they have relationship problems, and the three of them stop an out-of-control streetcar from hurting anyone. On the third night she walks in on Buffy and Giles looking over old spell-books, and Giles remembers the human from the film crew as a former Watcher-in-training, deducing that he and the vampire cameraman are trying to kill Buffy, tired of her messing with primordial forces. Buffy slays the vampire, and the would-be Watcher is turned over to the police. Harmony believes that if a Watcher and vampire hate Buffy enough to work together, she should realise that rules exist for a reason, and that if she keeps breaking them she might break everything. Buffy ignores this, and Harmony is unsure if that makes her the best Slayer ever, or the worst.

=== Angel & Faith ===
Angel begins as the self-appointed guardian over London's new Magic Town ghetto created by events of Angel & Faith in the previous season, while Faith is on a journey to find herself, initially in the United States. Many of the town's residents have mutated into magical creatures, and Angel is forced to adjust to this new status quo, making an ally in London police officer Detective Brandt and relying on previous local friends Alasdair Coames and the Fairweather sisters Lavinia and Sophronia. He learns that the aggressive Slayer Nadira has survived her injuries at the conclusion of Season Nine and mutated into a benevolent seer who can commune with the unique magic of Magic Town, which she says is sentient. Angel is initially frustrated by the half-demon Pearl from Season Nine and a plot run by mutated magical pixies that leads him to the witch Amy Madison. Amy is vengeful for the events of Season Eight, and has gained great power from Magic Town's energy intending to kill Willow. However, Nadira easily overpowers Amy. Soon after, Angel is stunned to find his deceased friend Fred Burkle walking the streets – alive following the events of Buffy in Season Nine, when Illyria, the demon wearing Fred's former body, appeared to die during the event which restored magic to the world.

Meanwhile, Faith begins working for Kennedy's Slayer bodyguard corporation but doesn't fit in and prepares to quit until she learns Buffy's ex Riley Finn has gone missing in South America. Faith rescues him and his wife Samantha from tribal vampires and Riley forgives her for the events of the Buffy episode "Who Are You", where she sexually assaulted Riley while leading him to believe she was Buffy. Faith is then recruited by Kennedy's client, pharmaceuticals owner Reese Zane, to come to Magic Town to help her study the magic there; she appoints Faith her head of security. Angel learns following the creation of the new Seed of Wonder, responsible for all magic in the universe, in Buffy, that Fred's essence was brought back when Illyria's body reconstituted. However, both entities are capable of surfacing and taking control of her body. Divorced again from her human traits, Illyria is convinced that Angel and the others want to destroy her to save Fred. Eldre Koh, a contemporary of Illyria from last season's Buffy title shows up to learn from Illyria who had him falsely imprisoned for killing his own family, only to discover it was Illyria herself. With coaxing from Nadira, Koh is able to give up his need for vengeance. After Illyria goes on a rampage, Fred is able to reassert control and contain Illyria inside her. Illyria and Fred fascinate Reese, who discloses her intent to research them further.

While Angel is away, Faith and Fred are called by Detective Brandt to look into a recent trend of murders caused by vampires in the London area. Realizing the connection to the deaths in Angel's dreams and a local Prep School, Faith & Fred go undercover as the gym teacher and lunch lady respectively. Faith notices a girl named Mary being bullied by her classmates. The bullies are all new vampires that have been ordered to convince their classmates to want to become vampires. Faith & Fred slay the bullies. Mary discovers the vampires want her to join them, while they are led by Drusilla. Archaeus has recruited Drusilla to sire the students and wants Mary sired for a special reason. Faith, Fred and Koh save Mary while dusting the vampire students, though Drusilla escapes. Faith and Fred decide to wait for Angel to return to figure out their next move, while Mary visits her father who is researching an ancient statue. Angel's return causes Drusilla's vampires to wreak havoc on Magic Town while they capture Nadira. Archaeus explains he can offer the energy of Magic Town a gift and wants Nadira to be his ambassador to the energy, intending to take over Magic Town with his vampire forces. Nadira warns him the energy of Magic Town will lash out at him like a bomb and unsuccessfully tries to fight her way out. Nadira is locked up as Drusilla has a plan to get the statue and Angel's team is on Archaeus' trail. With the statue on its way to Archaeus, Detective Brandt gives Angel a tip on his whereabouts, though nobody realizes Brandt is now a vampire. Archaeus and Drusilla try and talk Angel into coming "home" to them, but Archaeus' attempt to control Angel seems to awake Angelus. Archaeus sends Drusilla and some of his vampires to eliminate Faith and her team while taking Angelus to Nadira. Nadira claims she is worried The Magic may decide to side with Archaeus. Angel reveals he was putting on an act, allowing everyone to escape with Nadira. Archaeus has the statue unloaded in the middle of Magic Town. The sentient magic merges with it to give itself physical form and lashes out at any who approach. Angel confronts Brandt and Faith dusts the Detective. Nadira tries to calm The Magic down, saying she knows it wants to be like a real person, but it attacks Fred which summons an angry Illyria. Koh is able to convince Illyria they do not need to fight each other and forgives her for what she did to him, letting Fred return to the body. Nadira is able to get The Magic to stop fighting, but Archaeus shows up and offers it a place at his side as an equal. When Angel and everyone attack him, Archaeus claims it's proof that they only know violence and they would never treat The Magic fairly. Drusilla and hundreds of vampires reveal themselves as Archaeus's "family." The citizens and mutants of Magic Town rush to Angel & Faith's aid out of respect for all the help they've given them. The vampires are overwhelmed and many including Drusilla flee. Even alone, Archaeus proves powerful, and attacks Nadira. The Magic defends her by vacating the statue and locking Archaeus inside. Afterwards Nadira says she can sense it has gone somewhere quiet to think. The team toast their victory in protecting their new home of Magic Town.

== Publication ==
=== Buffy the Vampire Slayer Season Ten ===
==== Single issues ====
Title	Issue #	Release date
"New Rules, Part I"	1	March 19, 2014
Writer: Christos Gage		Penciller: Rebekah Isaacs
"New Rules, Part II"	2	April 23, 2014
Writer: Christos Gage		Penciller: Rebekah Isaacs
"New Rules, Part III"	3	May 21, 2014
Writer: Christos Gage and Nicholas Brendon		Penciller: Rebekah Isaacs
"New Rules, Part IV"	4	June 18, 2014
Writer: Christos Gage and Nicholas Brendon		Penciller: Rebekah Isaacs
"New Rules, Part V"	5	July 23, 2014
Writer: Christos Gage and Nicholas Brendon		Penciller: Rebekah Isaacs
"I Wish, Part I"	6	August 20, 2014
Writer: Christos Gage		Penciller: Karl Moline and Cliff Richards
"I Wish, Part II"	7	September 17, 2014
Writer: Christos Gage and Nicholas Brendon		Penciller: Rebekah Isaacs
"Return To Sunnydale, Part I"	8	October 22, 2014
Writer: Christos Gage		Penciller: Rebekah Isaacs and Richard Corben
"Return To Sunnydale, Part II"	9	November 19, 2014
Writer: Christos Gage		Penciller: Rebekah Isaacs
"Day Off (or Harmony In My Head)"	10	December 24, 2014
Writer: Christos Gage		Penciller: Rebekah Isaacs
"Love Dares You, Part I"	11	January 21, 2015
Writer: Christos Gage and Nicholas Brendon		Penciller: Megan Levens
"Love Dares You, Part II"	12	February 18, 2015
Writer: Christos Gage and Nicholas Brendon		Penciller: Megan Levens
"Love Dares You, Part III"	13	March 18, 2015
Writer: Christos Gage and Nicholas Brendon		Penciller: Megan Levens
"Relationship Status: Complicated, Part I"	14	April 22, 2015
Writer: Christos Gage		Penciller: Rebekah Isaacs
"Relationship Status: Complicated, Part II"	15	May 20, 2015
Writer: Christos Gage		Penciller: Rebekah Isaacs
"Old Demons, Part I"	16	June 17, 2015
Writer: Christos Gage		Penciller: Rebekah Isaacs
"Old Demons, Part II"	17	July 22, 2015
Writer: Christos Gage		Penciller: Rebekah Isaacs
"Old Demons, Part III"	18	August 19, 2015
Writer: Christos Gage		Penciller: Rebekah Isaacs
"Freaky Giles Day"	19	September 23, 2015
Writer: Christos Gage and Nicholas Brendon		Penciller: Rebekah Isaacs
"Triggers"	20	October 21, 2015
Writer: Christos Gage		Penciller: Megan Levens
"In Pieces on the Ground, Part I"	21	November 18, 2015
Writer: Christos Gage		Penciller: Rebekah Isaacs
"In Pieces on the Ground, Part II"	22	December 23, 2015
Writer: Christos Gage		Penciller: Rebekah Isaacs
"In Pieces on the Ground, Part III"	23	January 20, 2016
Writer: Christos Gage		Penciller: Megan Levens
"In Pieces on the Ground, Part IV"	24	February 17, 2016
Writer: Christos Gage		Penciller: Megan Levens
"In Pieces on the Ground, Part V"	25	March 23, 2016
Writer: Christos Gage		Penciller: Megan Levens
"Own It, Part I: Home Sweet Hell"	26	April 20, 2016
Writer: Christos Gage		Penciller: Rebekah Isaacs
"Own It, Part II: The Centre Cannot Hold"	27	May 18, 2016
Writer: Christos Gage		Penciller: Rebekah Isaacs
"Own It, Part III: Taking Ownership"	28	June 22, 2016
Writer: Christos Gage		Penciller: Rebekah Isaacs
"Own It, Part IV: Vengeance"	29	July 20, 2016
Writer: Christos Gage		Penciller: Rebekah Isaacs
"Own It, Part V: It's On You"	30	August 24, 2016
Writer: Christos Gage		Penciller: Rebekah Isaacs

==== Trade Paperbacks ====
Volume	Title	Issues collected	Release date	ISBN
1	"New Rules"	New Rules (1-5)	November 12, 2014	ISBN 978-1-61655-490-3
2	"I Wish"	I Wish (6-7); Return to Sunnydale (8-9); Harmony in My Head (10)	April 8, 2015	ISBN 978-1-61655-600-6
3	"Love Dares You"	Love Dares You (11-13); Relationship Status Complicated (14-15)	September 29, 2015	ISBN 978-1-61655-758-4
4	"Old Demons"	Old Demons (16–18); Freaky Giles Day (19); Triggers (20)	February 23, 2016	ISBN 978-1-61655-802-4
5	"In Pieces on the Ground"	In Pieces on the Ground (21-25)	July 26, 2016	ISBN 978-1-61655-944-1
6	"Own It"	Own It (26-30); Where Are They Now?	December 27, 2016	ISBN 978-1-5067-0034-2

==== Library Editions ====
Volume	Trade Paperbacks collected	Release date	ISBN
1	Buffy the Vampire Slayer – Season 10, Volume 1: New Rules Buffy the Vampire Slayer – Season 10, Volume 2: I wish	July 18, 2018	ISBN 978-1-5067-0645-0
2	Buffy the Vampire Slayer – Season 10, Volume 3: Love Dares You Buffy the Vampire Slayer – Season 10, Volume 4: Old Demons	September 12, 2018	ISBN 978-1-5067-0657-3
3	Buffy the Vampire Slayer – Season 10, Volume 5: In Pieces on the Ground Buffy the Vampire Slayer – Season 10, Volume 6: Own It	November 14, 2018	ISBN 978-1-5067-0820-1

=== Angel & Faith Season Ten ===
==== Single issues ====
Title	Issue #	Release date
"Where the River Meets the Sea, Part I"	1	April 2, 2014
Writer: Victor Gischler		Penciller: Will Conrad
"Where the River Meets the Sea, Part II"	2	May 7, 2014
Writer: Victor Gischler		Penciller: Will Conrad
"Where the River Meets the Sea, Part III"	3	June 4, 2014
Writer: Victor Gischler		Penciller: Will Conrad
"Where the River Meets the Sea, Part IV"	4	July 2, 2014
Writer: Victor Gischler		Penciller: Will Conrad
"Old Habits"	5	August 6, 2014
Writer: Victor Gischler		Penciller: Derlis Santacruz
"Lost & Found, Part I"	6	September 3, 2014
Writer: Victor Gischler		Penciller: Will Conrad
"Lost & Found, Part II"	7	October 1, 2014
Writer: Victor Gischler		Penciller: Will Conrad
"Lost & Found, Part III"	8	November 5, 2014
Writer: Victor Gischler		Penciller: Will Conrad
"Lost & Found, Part IV"	9	December 3, 2014
Writer: Victor Gischler		Penciller: Will Conrad
"Lost & Found Part V"	10	January 7, 2015
Writer: Victor Gischler		Penciller: Will Conrad
"United, Part I"	11	February 4, 2015
Writer: Victor Gischler		Penciller: Will Conrad
"United, Part II"	12	March 4, 2015
Writer: Victor Gischler		Penciller: Will Conrad
"United, Part III"	13	April 1, 2015
Writer: Victor Gischler		Penciller: Will Conrad
"United, Part IV"	14	May 6, 2015
Writer: Victor Gischler		Penciller: Will Conrad
"Fight or Flight"	15	June 3, 2015
Writer: Kel McDonald		Penciller: Cliff Richards
"Those Who Can't Teach, Teach Gym, Part I"	16	July 1, 2015
Writer: Victor Gischler		Penciller: Cliff Richards
"Those Who Can't Teach, Teach Gym, Part II"	17	August 5, 2015
Writer: Victor Gischler		Penciller: Cliff Richards
"Those Who Can't Teach, Teach Gym, Part III"	18	September 2, 2015
Writer: Victor Gischler		Penciller: Cliff Richards
"A Little More Than Kin, Part I"	19	October 7, 2015
Writer: Victor Gischler		Penciller: Will Conrad
"A Little More Than Kin, Part II"	20	November 4, 2015
Writer: Victor Gischler		Penciller: Will Conrad
"A Tale of Two Families, Part I"	21	December 2, 2015
Writer: Victor Gischler		Penciller: Will Conrad
"A Tale of Two Families, Part II"	22	January 6, 2016
Writer: Victor Gischler		Penciller: Will Conrad
"A Tale of Two Families, Part III"	23	February 3, 2016
Writer: Victor Gischler		Penciller: Will Conrad
"A Tale of Two Families, Part IV"	24	March 2, 2016
Writer: Victor Gischler		Penciller: Will Conrad
"A Tale of Two Families, Part V"	25	April 6, 2016
Writer: Victor Gischler		Penciller: Will Conrad

==== Trade Paperbacks ====
Volume	Title	Issues collected	Release date	ISBN
1	"Where the River Meets the Sea"	Where the River Meets the Sea (1–4); Old Habits (5)	December 10, 2014	ISBN 978-1-61655-503-0
2	"Lost and Found"	Lost and Found (6–10)	May 26, 2015	ISBN 978-1-61655-601-3
3	"United"	United (11–14); Fight or Flight (15)	October 14, 2015	ISBN 978-1-61655-766-9
4	"A Little More Than Kin"	Those Who Can't Teach, Teach Gym (16-18); A Little More Than Kin (19-20)	March 9, 2016	ISBN 978-1-61655-890-1
5	"A Tale of Two Families"	A Tale of Two Families (21–25)	August 23, 2016	ISBN 978-1-61655-965-6
