= Countdown (2016 film) =

- Directed by: John Stockwell
- Written by: Richard Wenk; Michael Finch
- Produced by: Michael J. Luisi
- Starring: Dolph Ziggler; Kane; Katharine Isabelle
- Cinematography: Cliff Hokanson
- Edited by: Rick Shaine
- Music by: Claude Foisy
- Production company: WWE Studios
- Distributed by: Lionsgate Home Entertainment
- Release date: April 5, 2016
- Running time: 103 minutes
- Country: United States
- Language: English

Countdown (originally known as 6:42) is a 2016 American action film starring Dolph Ziggler, Katharine Isabelle and Kane. The film is directed by John Stockwell and written by Richard Wenk and Michael Finch and produced by WWE Studios. It was released direct-to-video and Digital HD by Lionsgate on April 5, 2016.

== Plot ==
Ray Thompson, a narcotics cop recently back on duty after a suspension, receives a package at the station. This leads to a website that shows a madman holding a child hostage. The child has timed explosives strapped to his body. Lt. Cronin arranges to pay the $2,000,112.35 ransom demanded by this criminal and makes Ray the bagman. When the exchange is bungled, Ray shoots and kills the madman before he sets the explosives off. Ray has to team up with Internal Affairs agent Julia Baker to locate the child before it's too late.

== Cast ==
- Dolph Ziggler as Ray Thompson
- Katharine Isabelle as Lieutenant Julia Baker
- Josh Blacker as Detective Al Kendricks
- Kane as Lieutenant Frank Cronin
- Rusev as himself (cameo)
- Lana as herself (cameo)
- Alexander Kalugin as Nikolai
- Michael Kopsa as Makarov
- Alan O'Silva as Vladislav Pavel
- Catherine Lough Haggquist as Lilly
- Jennifer Cheon as Rachel
- Luke Roessler as Anatoli
- Alexander 'Sasha' Mandra as Boris

Professional wrestling personalities Jimmy Uso, Jey Uso, Roman Reigns, Santino Marella, Dean Ambrose, Curtis Axel, Mark Henry, Big Show, Daniel Bryan, Heath Slater, Randy Orton, Charles Robinson, Big E, Kofi Kingston, Xavier Woods, Viktor, Konnor, Sin Cara, Kalisto, Brock Lesnar, and Paul Heyman have uncredited appearances.
