= The Mechanic (2011 film) =

2011 American action thriller film directed by Simon West

- Theatrical release poster
- Directed by: Simon West
- Screenplay by: Lewis John Carlino; Richard Wenk
- Story by: Lewis John Carlino
- Based on: The Mechanic (1972 film) by Lewis John Carlino
- Produced by: David Winkler; William Chartoff
- Starring: Jason Statham; Ben Foster; Tony Goldwyn; Donald Sutherland
- Cinematography: Eric Schmidt
- Edited by: T.G. Herrington; Todd E. Miller
- Music by: Mark Isham
- Production companies: CBS Films; Millennium Films; Nu Image; Chartoff-Winkler Productions
- Distributed by: CBS Films
- Release date: January 28, 2011
- Running time: 93 minutes
- Country: United States
- Language: English
- Budget: $40 million
- Box office: $76.3 million

The Mechanic is a 2011 American action thriller film directed by Simon West, and starring Jason Statham, Ben Foster, Tony Goldwyn, and Donald Sutherland. A remake of the 1972 film of the same name, it centers on Arthur Bishop (Statham), a professional assassin or 'mechanic', who specializes in making his hits look like accidents, suicides and petty criminals' acts.

It was released in the U.S. and Canada on January 28, 2011, where it was praised for its action sequences and Statham's performance. A sequel, Mechanic: Resurrection, was released on August 26, 2016.

== Plot ==
Hitman Arthur Bishop sneaks into the home of a Colombian cartel boss and drowns him in his own pool. Upon returning home to Louisiana, he meets with his friend and mentor Harry McKenna.

Bishop is assigned by his employer Dean to kill Harry. Dean says this is due to a failed mission in South Africa, in which his team of assassins were killed; since the mission was known only to Dean and Harry, Dean attributes the failure of the mission to Harry ratting them out to the South African police, making him a threat. Bishop reluctantly kills Harry and makes it look like a carjacking. At Harry's funeral, Bishop meets Harry's estranged son Steve, whom he later stops from killing another carjacker in revenge.

Steve asks Bishop to train him as a hitman; Bishop thus takes him under his wing and gives Steve his next contract, fellow assassin Burke. He also brings Steve to another contract killing to observe. Ignoring Bishop's instructions to overdose Burke with Rohypnol, Steve goes with him to his house and attempts to strangle the much larger man with a belt, imitating Bishop's last killing. He barely manages to kill Burke after a lengthy fight. Dean expresses disapproval of Bishop using Steve, which violates the rules of the contract.

Bishop's next target is cult leader Andrew Vaughn, whom Steve suggests they inject with adrenaline to simulate a heart attack. However, Vaughn's doctor administers an IV of ketamine, which would inhibit the adrenaline's effects. The two choke Vaughn to death instead with a mini camera.

They are discovered by the guards, shoot their way out, and fly home separately to avoid suspicion. At the airport, Bishop catches sight of a hitman who was supposedly killed in the South Africa mission that Harry sold out. The hitman reveals that Dean engineered the failed mission to cover up his own shady dealings. Bishop realizes Dean framed Harry and tricked Bishop into killing him.

Angry at being tricked, Bishop takes down the team Dean sends to kill him and helps Steve when Steve is also ambushed. Steve finds his father's gun in Bishop's belongings, and realizes that Bishop killed him. Bishop and Steve kill Dean together. Bishop plans to disappear with a new identity now that his employer is dead. When they stop for gas, Steve, in revenge, blows up the truck with Bishop still inside.

Steve returns to Bishop's home and does two things Bishop told him not to: plays a record on the turntable and steals Bishop's 1966 Jaguar E-Type. As he drives, Steve finds a note on the passenger seat; it reads: "Steve, if you're reading this, then you're dead." The car then explodes, killing him. Another explosion from the rigged turntable destroys the house. Bishop had seen Steve carrying his father's gun, and knew beforehand that Steve would betray him.

Security footage at the gas station reveals that Bishop had escaped from the truck before the explosion. He gets into a spare truck and drives away.

== Cast ==
- Jason Statham as Arthur Bishop
- Ben Foster as Steve McKenna
- Tony Goldwyn as Dean Sanderson
- Donald Sutherland as Harry McKenna
- Jeff Chase as Burke
- John McConnell as Andrew Vaughn
- Mini Andén as Sarah
- Stuart Greer as Ralph
- Christa Campbell as Kelly
- Lance E. Nichols as Henry
- J.D. Evermore as Gun Runner
- David Leitch as Sebastian
- Mark Nutter as John Finch
- Lara Grice as Mrs. Finch
- Ada Michelle Loridans as Finch's Daughter
- Katarzyna Wolejnio as Maria
- James Logan as Jorge Lara
- Eddie J. Fernandez as Lara's Guard
- Joshua Bridgewater as Raymond
- Choop as Arthur The Dog

== Production ==
=== Development ===
Irwin Winkler and Robert Chartoff, producers of the 1972 film, sought to make an update. Pre-rights to the remake were sold in February 2009 at the Berlin Film Festival. Variety reported that the screenplay was written by Karl Gajdusek. However, the final script is credited to Richard Wenk and Lewis John Carlino (the writer of the 1972 film).

=== Casting ===
Director Simon West and Jason Statham were announced as part of the project three months later. Ben Foster and Donald Sutherland were cast alongside Statham in October 2009.

=== Filming ===
Filming began in New Orleans, Louisiana, on October 26, 2009. Filming locations included St. Tammany Parish, the World Trade Center in downtown New Orleans, and the Algiers Seafood Market.

== Soundtrack ==
The Mechanic: Original Motion Picture Soundtrack

Film score by Mark Isham
- Released: January 25, 2011
- Length: 71:36
- Label: MIM Records MIM002

Mark Isham chronology
The Crazies (2010)	The Mechanic: Original Motion Picture Soundtrack (2011)	Warrior (2011)

The soundtrack for the film was released on January 25, 2011, by MIM Records.

All tracks are written by Mark Isham.

The Mechanic: Original Motion Picture Soundtrack
No.	Title	Length
1.	"Barranquilla"	1:22
2.	"Drowning"	3:11
3.	"Bayou"	1:17
4.	"Liquor Fairy"	1:17
5.	"Coffee Shop to Bar"	0:46
6.	"I Want a Meeting"	2:31
7.	"Poisoned the Well"	2:07
8.	"Amat Victoria Curam"	5:31
9.	"Looking Back"	0:33
10.	"Carjack"	2:35
11.	"I Wanna Know What You Know"	1:44
12.	"Up Close"	2:35
13.	"Up Close (Alternate Version)"	2:34
14.	"Chihuahuas and Boys"	1:54
15.	"Don't Get in His Car"	1:37
16.	"Anger, and a Place to Put It"	3:58
17.	"An Outside Individual"	1:53
18.	"I'm Not a Reverend (Vaughn's Setup Part 1)"	1:14
19.	"Vaughn's Setup Part 2"	4:37
20.	"Vaughn's Hit Part 1"	2:27
21.	"They're in the Wall (Vaughn's Hit Part 2)"	2:45
22.	"They Played You So Easily"	3:47
23.	"Left Side Cushion"	3:51
24.	"Fingers, Wrist, Elbow?"	2:17
25.	"Save the Fuel, I'm Coming for You"	4:46
26.	"Gun Sting"	0:35
27.	"Vengeance is the Mission"	3:16
28.	"The Mechanic"	3:07
29.	"Original 1m1 (Bonus Track)"	1:29

== Release ==
=== Theatrical ===
The Mechanic was released in the United States and Canada on January 28, 2011. Millennium Films sold U.S. distribution rights to CBS Films for the release. It was expected to perform well with male audiences, with its release a week before Super Bowl XLV. In the United Kingdom, the distribution rights were sold to Lionsgate.

=== TV advertisement ban ===
In June 2011, the UK's Advertising Standards Authority banned an advertisement for the film from being broadcast on British television. The ban followed complaints from 13 viewers regarding a screening of the advert during the teen show Glee. In its ruling, the authority found that, although the advert was shown post-watershed, it was likely that a large number of viewers under the age of 16 would have been watching Glee at the time, and criticized the "stream of violent imagery" portrayed in the advert.

== Reception ==
=== Box office ===
The film grossed $11.4 million on its opening weekend in the U.S. and Canada. It ended with a North American gross of $29.1 million and $47.2 million in other territories, for a worldwide total of $76.3 million.

=== Critical response ===
The Mechanic received mixed reviews from critics. Review aggregator Rotten Tomatoes gives the film an approval rating of 54%, based on 165 reviews, with a rating average of 5.6/10. The site's critical consensus reads, "Jason Statham and Ben Foster turn in enjoyable performances, but this superficial remake betrays them with mind-numbing violence and action thriller cliches." On Metacritic, which assigns a weighted average score to reviews from mainstream critics, the film received an average score of 49 out of 100, based on 35 critics, indicating "mixed or average reviews". Audiences polled by CinemaScore gave the film an average grade of "B−" on an A+ to F scale.

Roger Ebert awarded the film two out of four stars:

Audiences have been drilled to accept noise and movement as entertainment. It is done so well one almost forgets to ask why it has been done at all.

== Sequel ==
Dennis Gansel directed a sequel, with Jason Statham returning as Arthur Bishop.
