= Warrior (soundtrack) =

2011 film soundtrack album

Warrior (Original Score)

Film score by Mark Isham
- Released: September 11, 2011
- Recorded: 2010–2011
- Genre: Film score
- Length: 54:14
- Label: Lakeshore
- Producer: Mark Isham

Mark Isham chronology
The Mechanic (2011)	Warrior (2011)	Dolphin Tale (2011)

Warrior (Original Score) is the film score composed by Mark Isham to the 2011 film Warrior directed by Gavin O'Connor starring Tom Hardy and Joel Edgerton. The film score was released through Lakeshore Records on September 11, 2011, and received a Hollywood Music in Media Award for Best Original Score in a Feature Film.

== Development ==
The original score for Warrior is composed by Mark Isham, who previously associated with O'Connor in Miracle (2004) and Pride and Glory (2008). He consdered finding the musical vocabulary of the film being a bigger challenge, as he should not restrict to the world of mixed martial arts, but dwell deeper into the emotional and psychological human drama. Isham noted that a traditional score would not suit for the film, which resulted in him spending weeks on finding the appropriate genres and types of music that could be suited for the film. Isham also worked with few music editors who helped him experimenting the appropriate sounds for the score.

Isham felt the main challenge revolved around capturing the subtle and emotionally complex family drama and the triumphant nature of the sports film without imitating Rocky (1976) leading to a trial-and-error process. Isham composed a father and son theme, as the film revolved around a father and their two sons who are all estranged. Hence, a single theme was composed so that it could unite those characters, and felt more effective that composing multiple themes for characters, and a separate theme for the union of those characters, and their aspirations. Isham said that with this approach, even though the father does not speak to their sons, the music would allow the audiences to witness what they share together, thereby providing a clarity and emotional richness to the story.

Isham utilized a restrained, atmospheric and minimalistic music to reflect the brothers' emotional circumstances and the strained family dynamic in the earlier parts of the film. In the sports sequences, Isham utilized the guitar as the central point of the score, to make it modernistic and provide the triumph for the mixed martial arts sequences. A combination of drums, electric guitars, rock and roll guitars, heavy bass and sampled music, used for a full-fledged modernistic score, similar to a rock band while for the emotional payoff to aid the Rocky style ending, a large orchestra had been utilized especially for the buildup in the final scene.

== Reception ==
James Southall of Movie Wave wrote "Isham’s a composer who is able to generate real feelings from his electronic music – not really all that common in film music" and considered it to be "a soothing, rewarding album". William Ruhlmann of AllMusic wrote "Composer Mark Isham expresses the film's aspirations in music that appropriately combines classical and contemporary elements, and that plumbs deep emotions." Daniel Schweiger of AssignmentX wrote "Mark Isham provides gripping downbeat inspiration for mixed martial arts".

== Track listing ==
No.	Title	Length
1.	"Listen to the Beethoven"	05:28
2.	"Paddy & Tommy"	03:48
3.	"Sparta – Night One"	09:02
4.	"I Can't Watch You Fight"	02:30
5.	"Koba"	06:10
6.	"Hero"	02:00
7.	"Brendan & Tess"	01:52
8.	"The Devil You Know"	01:33
9.	"Stop the Ship" (Relapse)	05:58
10.	"Warrior"	03:54
11.	"Brendan & Tommy"	04:41
12.	"About Today" (The National)	07:18
Total length:		54:14

== For Your Consideration ==
As a part of the 2011–12 film awards season, a "For Your Consideration" album was published by Lionsgate as CDs for industry people owing to a possible contention for major awards during that time.

No.	Title	Length
1.	"Opening"	00:35
2.	"Main Title"	00:32
3.	"Paddy And Tommy Talk"	03:48
4.	"Tommy Gives Pills To Paddy / Brendan In School"	01:32
5.	"Brendan And Tess Talk In Kids Room"	01:52
6.	"Training Montage"	04:47
7.	"Tess Says She Can't Watch Brendan Fight Again"	01:04
8.	"Brendan And Tommy See Each Other"	01:28
9.	"Marine On Tv Tells Of Tommy Being A Hero"	02:01
10.	"Kids Plead With Principal / SPARTA Night #1"	01:15
11.	"Brendan / Midnight Round"	01:13
12.	"Brendan / Midnight Round #2 / Brendan Wins Fight / SPARTA Night #1 / Fight Montage"	06:39
13.	"Paddy Walks Off / Tommy Can You Hear Me"	04:50
14.	"Frank's Corner Talk / Koba Round 3 / Brendan Beats Koba / Pilar Interview"	06:10
15.	"The Walk Out"	03:54
16.	"Rounds 2-4 Montage / Last Round"	04:41
Total length:		46:21

== Live performances ==
The score was performed live at the International Film Music Festival in Córdoba, Spain in September 2012.

== Personnel ==
Credits adapted from liner notes:

- Music composer and producer – Mark Isham
- Additional music – Cindy O'Connor
- Assemblage – Jason LaRocca
- Recording – Gary Chester
- Mixing – Jason LaRocca, Hector Delgado
- Mastering – Dave Donnelly
- Score editor – Gedney Webb, Julie Pearce
- Supervisor – Brian Ross
- Executive producer – Brian McNelis, Skip Williamson
- A&R – Eric Craig

Performer

- Performer – FILMharmonic Orchestra Prague, The National, The Sodden Dog Electronic Arts Ensemble
- Cello – Zoë Keating
- Electronic pre-recording – Tyler Parkinson
- Guitar – Jason LaRocca

Orchestra

- Orchestrator – Brad Dechter
- Additional orchestrator – Jonathan Bartz
- Orchestra conductor – Adam Klemens
- Orchestra contractor – Petr Pycha

Cover

- Art direction and design – John Bergin
- Cover – Tim Palen
- Photography – Chuck Zlotnick

== Accolades ==
The score was shortlisted as one among the 97 contenders for the Best Original Score category at the 84th Academy Awards.

Award	Category	Recipient(s)	Result	Ref.
Hollywood Music in Media Awards	Original Score – Feature Film	Mark Isham	Won	
International Film Music Critics Association	Best Original Score for an Action/Adventure/Thriller Film	Mark Isham	Nominated	
