= Fast Charlie =

2023 American film by Phillip Noyce

- Theatrical release poster
- Directed by: Phillip Noyce
- Screenplay by: Richard Wenk
- Based on: Gun Monkeys by Victor Gischler
- Produced by: Ryan Donnell Smith; Brent C. Johnson; Jeff Holland; Daniel Grodnik; Mitchell Welch
- Starring: Pierce Brosnan; Morena Baccarin; Gbenga Akinnagbe; Toby Huss; Jacob Grodnik; Sharon Gless; James Caan
- Cinematography: Warwick Thornton
- Edited by: Lee Haugen; Jered Zalman
- Music by: Fil Eisler
- Production companies: Ashland Hill Media Finance; Thomasville Pictures
- Distributed by: Vertical Entertainment
- Release dates: October 7, 2023 (Mill Valley); December 8, 2023 (United States)
- Running time: 90 minutes
- Country: United States
- Language: English
- Budget: $16 million

Fast Charlie is a 2023 American independent Southern noir crime thriller film directed by Phillip Noyce and written by Richard Wenk, who based his screenplay on the 2001 pulp novel Gun Monkeys by Victor Gischler. It stars Pierce Brosnan, Morena Baccarin and James Caan in his final film role.

It premiered at the 2023 Mill Valley Film Festival on October 7, 2023. The film was released in select theatres and video on demand on December 8, 2023.

== Plot ==
Present: The film starts with Charlie stripping down at a car junkyard and narrating that he expected this kind of thing to happen sooner or later.

Past: Charlie Swift is a retired Marine Corps Officer living in Biloxi, Mississippi. For twenty years, Charlie has been a fixer and hitman for a mob boss named Stan Mullen. Beggar is another mob boss who is based from New Orleans and serves as the crew chief of the 9th Ward. Charlie is paired up with Blade by Stan to kill Rollo Kramer and take his body to Beggar. However, a clumsy Blade sets off a bomb planted in a donut box delivered to Rollo severing his head off. They take the body in their car to visit Marcie Kramer, ex-wife of Rollo, working as a taxidermist, to identify him for which she shows a tattoo on his back. Blade holds Charlie and Marcie at gunpoint and takes Rollo away to get all the cash for himself, only to accidentally shoot himself in his head and crash the car at an electric post, destroying Rollo's body. Since Rollo's body cannot be used anymore, Marcie, with the help of a tattoo artist makes the same tattoo on Blade's back and Charlie severs his head off. Charlie takes this body to Beggar who checks his back for the tattoo and feeds the body to his alligators. He then says to Charlie that he wants to talk to Stan about new businesses.

Back to Stan's home celebrating his birthday with Stan's accomplices, they discuss about their retirement plans. Charlie says he wants to go to Italy after retiring from being a hitman. Charlie has lunch with Marcie celebrating the death of Rollo. He sends her a raccoon as a gift to be taxidermied. Stan warns Charlie to stay away from Beggar. Later as Charlie cleans his car, two shooters enter his house who he eliminates after noticing them in his doorbell camera. Worried about his accomplices, Charlie goes to Stan's casino and notices Beggar leaving the place in a truck. Beggar had wiped out the whole gang. Charlie then goes to Stan's bedroom in his house and sees a body lying below Stan's bed. Furious, Charlie decides to take revenge on Beggar and his gang. Charlie stops by to see Sal for approval to take revenge but Sal says Beggar's an earner and Charlie should skip town.

Charlie goes to their strip club where his friend Milt works as a bouncer but Beggar's crew has already taken over. Charlie bribes him to go in and shoots Benny. Benny, one of Stan's friends, reveals Rollo had to be killed because he had a FBI evidence video CD of Beggar making illegal deals with a gang. Charlie then shoots Benny dead. Charlie then shoots Beggar's gang members in the club. While escaping, he is stopped by Paulie, one of Beggar's enforcers. Milt shoots Paulie. As Charlie exits the club, he notices Ronnie, another enforcer of Beggar, and follows him as he goes to Rollo's house. Charlie shoots Ronnie there. Marcie is attacked by two of Beggar's gang searching her house for the evidence CD. Marcie defends herself and kills the two. Charlie takes her away to Louisiana, Rollo's hometown. Marcie tells him Rollo owed her $50,000 and she wants to obtain the money which Rollo had in a box. Meanwhile, Lloyd, the strongest enforcer of Beggar breaks into Charlie's house searching for him.

Charlie and Marcie go to Rollo's house and find a hotel check-in letter. Charlie obtains Rollo's charges invoice at the hotel room. When he tries to get out, he is intercepted by Lloyd and hides in a laundry chute getting shot. Marcie and Charlie then go to Rollo's mother's house only to find out that the CD is not there and Rollo's mother spent all the money from the box to get herself breast implants. They then go to the bar where Rollo used to go frequently. Marcie finds the CD but gets intercepted by Lloyd and his gang and they kidnap Marcie to Beggar. Charlie is forced to take the CD to the junkyard driving with Lloyd. He intentionally crashes the car killing Lloyd by his root beer bottle stabbing himself in the crash. Charlie gets out of the car, steals a Fiat 500 and drives to the junkyard to save Marcie.

Present: Marcie is held at gunpoint by Beggar and demands the CD in exchange for her release. Charlie reveals that he's shown Sal the CD, which is a taped confession of Beggar giving the FBI evidence on Sal's operations, and has informed Sal that Beggar has been ratting on him for years. Milt shoots Beggar in the head with his sniper. Sometime later, they have dinner with Stan, who is revealed to be alive as the person dead near Stan's bed was his driver not himself but Stan is officially announced dead and now goes by Mr. Green. Sal gives Marcie the $50,000 she needs as a gift for helping with the Beggar situation. Charlie and Marcie emigrate to Tuscany.

== Cast ==
- Pierce Brosnan as Charlie Swift
- Morena Baccarin as Marcie Kramer
- Gbenga Akinnagbe as Beggar
- Toby Huss as Benny
- Fredric Lehne as Sal
- Brennan Keel Cook as Blade
- Christopher Matthew Cook as Lloyd "The Freak" Mercury
- Jacob Grodnik as Paulie
- Stephen Louis Grush as Goat
- Sharon Gless as Mavis
- James Caan as Stanley Stan Mullen

== Production ==
In June 2009, Victor Gischler's 2001 novel Gun Monkeys was optioned for a film adaptation, with Lee Goldberg writing the script and Ryuhei Kitamura set to direct. In 2018, producer Dan Grodnik discovered the project, acquired the underlying rights and brought in Phillip Noyce to direct (Noyce had directed Blind Fury starring Rutger Hauer for him in 1989).

Both Kevin Costner and Bryan Cranston expressed interest in starring, but the film didn't come together until Pierce Brosnan signed on. In March 2022, James Caan and Morena Baccarin joined the cast.

Filming began in April 2022 in New Orleans.

Fast Charlie was the last film to star Caan, who died on July 6, 2022. In the same month, Brosnan posted photos of Caan on the film's set.

== Release ==
The film premiered at the 2023 Mill Valley Film Festival on October 7, 2023, while the film was released in select theatres and video on demand on December 8, 2023, by Vertical Entertainment.

== Reception ==
On the review aggregator website Rotten Tomatoes, 83% of 30 critics' reviews are positive, with an average rating of 6.5/10. The website's consensus reads: "Thanks largely to Pierce Brosnan's charming work in the title role, Fast Charlie is a slickly watchable thriller that engages despite its standard story." Metacritic, which uses a weighted average, assigned the film a score of 65 out of 100, based on six critics, indicating "generally favorable" reviews.
