= Richard Wenk =

American screenwriter and director

- Born: May 6, 1956 (age 70); Metuchen, New Jersey, U.S.
- Occupations: Screenwriter; Film director
- Years active: 1986–present
- Notable work: The Expendables 2; The Equalizer film series; The Magnificent Seven

Richard Wenk (born May 6, 1956) is an American film screenwriter and director best known for his work on The Equalizer film series (2014–2023).

== Early life ==
Wenk was born in 1956 in Metuchen, New Jersey. He graduated from Metuchen High School in 1974, and from the New York University Tisch School of the Arts in 1979.

== Career ==
Wenk worked as an assistant to director John Huston on the 1982 film Annie. In 1984, he was recruited by New World Pictures producer Donald P. Borchers to write and direct the black comedy film Vamp (1986). Borchers had been impressed by Wenk's NYU thesis film, a musical vampire comedy short titled Dracula Bites the Big Apple. In 1994, he directed the comedy film Attack of the 5 Ft. 2 In. Women. In 1998, he wrote and directed the film Just the Ticket. In 2002, he directed the slasher film Wishcraft. In 2006, he wrote the script for Richard Donner's last film 16 Blocks. In 2011, he wrote the action film The Mechanic. By 2012, he wrote Simon West's ensemble action film The Expendables 2. In October 2012, he was hired to write the script for a Masters of the Universe reboot. He would receive an "additional literary material" credit for his work.

In 2014, he signed on to write the action film The Equalizer and its two sequels. In 2016, he wrote the action films Countdown, Jack Reacher: Never Go Back, and The Magnificent Seven. In 2017, he was hired to write the script and story for Renegades. In 2018, Wenk was hired to write the reboot of Universal Soldier. In 2021, he wrote the action thriller film The Protégé. In 2023, he wrote the action film Fast Charlie. In 2024, he wrote the superhero film Kraven the Hunter and the upcoming cop action film Lethal Weapon 5.

== Filmography ==
Year	Title	Director	Writer	Notes & ref.
1979	Dracula Bites the Big Apple	Yes	No	Also producer
1982	Annie	No	No	Production assistant
1986	Vamp	Yes	Yes	
1994	Attack of the 5 Ft. 2 In. Women	Yes	No	
1998	Just the Ticket	Yes	Yes	Also actor
2002	Wishcraft	Yes	No	
2006	16 Blocks	No	Yes	Also actor
2011	The Mechanic	No	Yes	
2012	The Expendables 2	No	Yes	
2014	The Equalizer	No	Yes	
2016	Countdown	No	Yes	
2016	The Magnificent Seven	No	Yes	
2016	Jack Reacher: Never Go Back	No	Yes	
2017	Renegades	No	Yes	
2018	The Equalizer 2	No	Yes	Also co-producer
2021	The Protégé	No	Yes	
2023	The Equalizer 3	No	Yes	Also co-producer
2023	Fast Charlie	No	Yes	
2024	Kraven the Hunter	No	Yes	
2026	Masters of the Universe	No	Uncredited	"additional literary material"

== Accolades ==
In 2014, for his work on The Equalizer, he was nominated at the 46th NAACP Image Awards for "Outstanding Writing in a Motion Picture". In 2025, for his work on Kraven the Hunter, he was nominated at the 45th Golden Raspberry Awards for "Worst Screenplay".
