= Victor Gischler =

American novelist

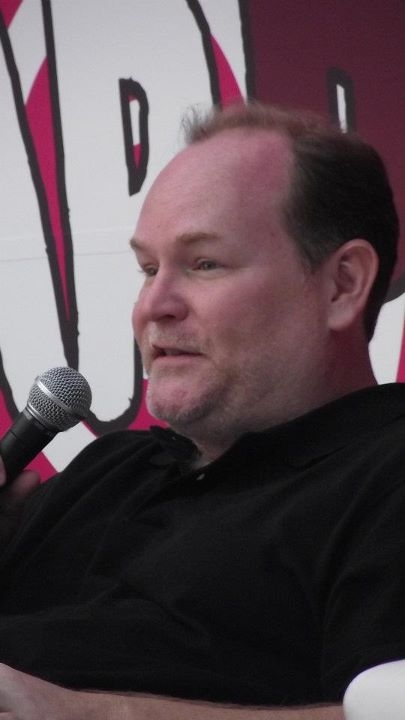
- Victor Gischler at the SugarPulp festival Padua, Italy on October 2, 2011
- Education: University of Southern Mississippi (PhD)
- Occupation: Author
- Writing career
- Genres: Crime; Superhero
- Notable works: Gun Monkeys; Shotgun Opera
- Notable awards: Edgar Award; Anthony Award
- Website: victorgischler.blogspot.com

Victor Gischler is an American author of comedic crime fiction.

== Career ==
Gischler's debut novel Gun Monkeys was nominated for the Edgar Award, and his novel Shotgun Opera was an Anthony Award finalist. His work has been translated into Italian, French, Spanish and Japanese. He earned a Ph.D. in English at the University of Southern Mississippi. His fifth novel Go-Go Girls of the Apocalypse was published in 2008 by the Touchstone/Fireside imprint of Simon & Schuster.

He has also written American comic books like The Punisher: Frank Castle, Wolverine and Deadpool (including Deadpool: Merc With a Mouth and Deadpool Corps) for Marvel Comics. Gischler worked on X-Men "Curse of the Mutants" starting in the Death of Dracula one-shot and continued in X-Men #1.

Gun Monkeys was optioned for a film adaptation with Lee Goldberg writing the script and Ryuhei Kitamura penciled in to direct, though no film release came from this project. The book was eventually adapted into the film Fast Charlie, directed by Philip Noyce from a screenplay by Richard Wenk.

== Bibliography ==
=== Novels ===
- Suicide Squeeze (368 pages, paperback, Uglytown Productions, December 2001, ISBN 0-9663473-6-6, hardback, Delacorte Press, March 2005, ISBN 0-385-33725-6, paperback, Dell Books, January 2006, ISBN 0-440-24170-7)
- Gun Monkeys (304 pages, Dell Books, November 2003, ISBN 0-440-24128-6)
- The Pistol Poets (368 pages, paperback, Dell Books, January 2005, ISBN 0-440-24169-3)
- Shotgun Opera (320 pages, paperback, Dell Books, April 2006, ISBN 0-440-24171-5)
- Go-Go Girls of the Apocalypse (336 pages, paperback, Touchstone Books, July 2008, ISBN 1-4165-5225-1)
- Vampire A Go Go (337 pages, paperback, Touchstone Books, September 2009, ISBN 1-4165-5227-8)
- The Deputy (256 pages, Tyrus Books, April 2010, hardback, ISBN 1-935562-01-0, paperback, ISBN 1-935562-00-2)
- Stay (Thomas Dunne Books, June 2015, ISBN 9781250041517)
- Gestapo Mars (a Carter Sloan novel) (297 pages, Titan Books, September 2015, ISBN 978-1-78329-735-1)
- No Good Deed (288 pages, hardback, Forge Books, September 2018, ISBN 9781250106698)

==== A Fire Beneath the Skin ====
1. Ink Mage (400 pages, paperback, 47North, October 2013, ISBN 9781477849309)
2. The Tattooed Duchess (368 pages, paperback, 47North, July 2015, ISBN 9781503948228)
3. A Painted Goddess (400 pages, paperback, 47North, March 2016, ISBN 9781503954762)

=== Comics ===
- Punisher MAX Special: Little Black Book (with Jefte Palo, one-shot, MAX, August 2008)
- Wolverine: Revolver (with Das Pastoras, one-shot, Marvel Comics, August 2009)
- The Punisher: Frank Castle MAX #71-74 (with Goran Parlov, MAX, August–November 2009)
- Deadpool: Merc With a Mouth #1-13 (with Bong Dazo, Marvel Comics, September 2009 - September 2010)
- "Great Balls of Thunder on the Deep Blue Sea" (with Sanford Greene, in Deadpool #900, December 2009)
- Prelude to Deadpool Corps (with an issue each by Rob Liefeld, Whilce Portacio, Philip Bond, Paco Medina and Kyle Baker, 5-issue limited series, Marvel Comics, May 2010)
- Deadpool Corps #1-12 (with Rob Liefeld, ongoing series, Marvel Comics, June 2010 - May 2011)
- Death of Dracula (with Giuseppe Camuncoli, one-shot, Marvel Comics, August 2010)
- X-Men #1-29 (with Paco Medina, ongoing series, Marvel Comics, September 2010 – June 2012)
- Fear Itself: Hulk vs Dracula (with Ryan Stegman, 3-issue limited series, Marvel Comics, November 2011 - December 2011)
- Buffy the Vampire Slayer: Spike (with Paul Lee, 5-issue limited series, Dark Horse Comics, August 2012 - December 2012)
- Conan: The Phantoms of the Black Coast (with Attila Futaki, 5-issue limited series, Dark Horse Comics, October 2012 - February 2013)
- The Shadow #7-12 (with Aaron Campbell, ongoing series, Dynamite Comics, October 2012 – April 2013)
- Kiss Me Satan (with Juan Ferreyra, 5-issue limited series, Dark Horse Comics, September 2013 – present)
- Clown Fatale (with Maurizio Rosenzweig, 4-issue limited series, Dark Horse Comics, November 2013 – present)
- Noir (with Andrea Mutti, 5-issue limited series, Dynamite Comics, November 2013 – present)
- Sally of the Wasteland (with Tazio Bettin, 5-issue limited series, Titan Comics, August 2014 – present)
